= 2008 Waterford Senior Football Championship =

Tournament details
- County: Waterford
- Year: 2008

Winners
- Champions: The Nire
- Captain: John Moore

Promotion/Relegation
- Relegated team(s): John Mitchels

Other
- Player of the Year: Gary Hurney

The 2008 Waterford Senior Football Championship is the championship of the Waterford Senior Football Championship, the premier gaelic football competition in County Waterford, having commenced on 11 May 2008. There were 13 teams in the championship, structured into 2 groups of four teams and 1 group of 5 teams. From these groups, quarter finals, and semi-finals were played with a county final played in Fraher Field. Ballinacourty were the defending champions having beaten Ardmore in the 2007 final.

== Championship Structure ==
13 teams are competing in the 2008 championship. The 13 teams are split into 3 groups, 2 of which contain 4 teams and 1 which contains 5 teams. The top 2 teams in each of the 3 groups automatically progress into the quarter-finals. The 3rd placed teams in all groups qualify for a Round of 16 game, with two winners gaining entry into the quarter-final.

Teams on equal points in each group are ranked by highest points difference (points scored less points conceded). However, no team may be eliminated from the championship who finish on equal points. For this reason, playoffs are needed in both Group A and Group C to decide who finishes 3rd in this group and to decide who moves on in the championship.

== Group A ==
=== Standings ===
P	Team	Pld	W	D	L	PF	PA	PD	Pts
1	Ballinacourty	3	3	0	0	51	27	+24	6
2	St. Saviours	3	1	0	2	28	32	−4	2
3	Brickey Rangers	3	1	0	2	32	38	−6	2
4	Kilrossanty	3	1	0	2	28	42	−14	2

Qualification
Qualified for Quarter Finals
Qualified for round of 16
Entered for relegation playoff

=== Matches ===
11 May 2008
Round 1

Brickey Rangers	1–11 – 2–06	Kilrossanty
	(Report)

Fraher Field, Dungarvan
Referee: Domhnall Ó Murchadha

11 May 2008
Round 1

Ballinacourty	0–14 – 2–05	St. Saviours
	(Report)

Lemybrien, County Waterford
Referee: Tadhg Ó Broin

15 June 2008
Round 2

Ballinacourty	2–08 – 1–06	Brickey Rangers

15 June 2008
Round 2

Kilrossanty	0–09 – 0–05	St. Saviours

27 September 2008
Round 3

St. Saviours	1–09 – 0–09	Brickey Rangers
	(Report)

Kill, County Waterford
Referee: Tommy O'Sullivan

28 September 2008
Round 3

Ballinacourty	3–14 – 0–07	Kilrossanty
	(Report)

Bohadoon, County Waterford
Referee: Dessie O'Leary

==== 3rd/4th Place Playoff ====
11 October 2008
1.30 p.m

Brickey Rangers	0–00 – 0–00	Kilrossanty

Bohadoon, County Waterford
Referee: TBA

== Group B ==
=== Standings ===
P	Team	Pld	W	D	L	PF	PA	PD	Pts
1	Clashmore	3	2	0	1	40	31	+9	4
2	Ardmore	3	2	0	1	38	39	−1	4
3	Rinn Ó gCuanach	3	1	1	1	37	39	−2	3
4	Rathgormack	3	0	1	2	30	36	−6	1

Qualification
Qualified for quarter-finals
Qualified for round of 16
Entered for relegation playoff

=== Matches ===
11 May 2008
Round 1

Ardmore	1–09 – 0–08	Rathgormack
	(Report)

Fraher Field, Dungarvan
Referee: Maurice Condon

11 May 2008
Round 1

Rinn Ó gCuanach	0–12 – 0–10	Clashmore
	(Report)

Fraher Field, Dungarvan
Referee: Tommy O'Sullivan

15 June 2008
Round 2

Rathgormack	1–09 – 1–09	Rinn Ó gCuanach
	(Report)

Lemybrien, County Waterford
Referee: Tadhg Ó Broin

15 June 2008
Round 2

Ardmore	0–09 – 2–12	Clashmore

Rinn Ó gCuanach, County Waterford
Referee: Domhnall Ó Murchadha

28 September 2008
Round 3

Ardmore	4–05 – 1–10	Rinn Ó gCuanach
	(Report)

Bushy Park, County Waterford
Referee: Maurice Condon

28 September 2008
Round 3

Clashmore	1–09 – 0–10	Rathgormack
	(Report)

Lemybrien, County Waterford
Referee: Tadhg Ó Broin

== Group C ==
=== Standings ===
P	Team	Pld	W	D	L	PF	PA	PD	Pts
1	The Nire	4	4	0	0	58	28	+30	8
2	Stradbally	4	3	0	1	60	44	+16	6
3	Gaultier GAA	4	1	1	2	45	51	−6	3
4	St Brendan's	4	1	1	2	39	57	−18	3
5	John Mitchels	4	0	0	4	44	66	−22	0

Qualification
Qualified for quarter-finals
Qualified for round of 16
Entered for relegation playoff

=== Matches ===
11 May 2008
Round 1

The Nire	1–14 – 1–05	St Brendan's
	(Report)

Lemybrien, County Waterford
Referee: Tim O’Byrne

11 May 2008
Round 1

Stradbally	1–08 – 1–07	Gaultier
	(Report)

Walsh Park, Waterford
Referee: Bryan Power

12 June 2008
Round 2

St Brendan's	0–13 – 0–10	John Mitchels
	(Report)

Kilmacthomas, County Waterford
Referee: Sean O Conduin

15 June 2008
Round 2

Gaultier	1–07 – 0–10	St Brendan's
	(Report)

Walsh Park, Waterford
Referee: D O’Leary

15 June 2008
Round 2

The Nire	1–11 – 0–05	John Mitchels

22 June 2008
Round 3

Gaultier	2–11 – 2–09	John Mitchels
	(Report)

Kill, County Waterford
Referee: John Power

22 June 2008
Round 3

The Nire	1–09 – 0–07	Stradbally
	(Report)

Cappoquin, County Waterford
Referee: Maurice Condon

29 June 2008
Round 3

Stradbally	3–11 – 0–08	St Brendan's
	(Report)

Lemybrien, County Waterford
Referee: John Condon

28 September 2008
Round 4

The Nire	2–09 – 0–08	Gaultier
	(Report)

Kilmacthomas, County Waterford
Referee: Domhnall Ó Murchadha

28 September 2008
Round 4

Stradbally	2–16 – 2–08	John Mitchels
	(Report)

Kill, County Waterford
Referee: John Murray

==== 3rd/4th Place Playoff ====
7 October 2008
20:00

Gaultier	1–17 – 2–11 (a.e.t.)	St Brendan's

Kilmacthomas, County Waterford
Referee: Brian Power

== Relegation playoffs ==
Semi-finals
1	Kilrossanty	0–05
4	Rathgormack	0–09
3	John Mitchels	0–00
2	Bye	0–00

Final
Kilrossanty	1–09
John Mitchels	0–11

=== Matches ===
18 October 2008
14:00

Kilrossanty	0–05 – 0–09	Rathgormack
A. Power 0–3; P. Hayes 0–1; A. Quinn 0–1	(Report)	E. Hogan 0–4; R. Power 0–3; P. Crotty 0–1; V. O'Shea 0–1

Kilmacthomas, County Waterford
Referee: Tommy O'Sullivan

2 November 2008
14:00

Kilrosanty	1–09 – 0–11	John Mitchels
J. Veale 1–0; A. Power 0–3; S. Prendergast 0–2; D. Power 0–1; M. Kiely 0–1; T. Prendergast 0–1	(Report)	J. Power 0–9; L. Barry 0–1; F. Forgarty 0–1

Walsh Park, Waterford
Referee: Maurice Condon

== Knockout phase ==
- 6 teams, the top two finishers from each of the 3 groups, qualify directly for the quarter-finals.
- The 3 3rd place teams are entered for the Round of 16
- Brickey Rangers faced Gaulter in the first Round of 16 game with Brickey Rangers advancing to the quarter-finals.
- As the losing team from the first Round of 16 game, Gaulter faced Rinn Ó gCuanach in the 2nd Round of 16 game. Rinn Ó gCuanach won this game so also advanced to the quarter-finals.

Round of 16
Brickey Rangers	1–12
Gaultier	1–08
Rinn Ó gCuanach	6–11
Gaultier	1–08

Quarter-finals
Brickey Rangers	1–06
Clashmore	2–10
Ardmore	0–07
The Nire	1–13
Ballinacourty	3–09
Rinn Ó gCuanach	2–05
Stradbally	0–16
St. Saviours	0–08

Semi-finals
Clashmore	0–10
The Nire	0–13
Ballinacourty	2–09
Stradbally	0–08

Final
The Nire	0–12
Ballinacourty	0–08

=== Round of 16 ===
15 October 2008
19:30 IST

Gaultier	1–08 – 1–12	Brickey Rangers
A. FitzGerald 0–5; T. Dunphy 1–0; C. O'Riordan 0–2; P. Maher 0–1	(Report)	O. Casey 1–1; C. Shalloe 0–4; C. McGrath 0–3; A. Murphy 0–2; K. O'Brien 0–1; S. McGrath 0–1

Kilmacthomas, County Waterford
Referee: Maurice Condon

19 October 2008
TBA

Gaultier	1–08 – 6–11	Rinn Ó gCuanach

TBA
Referee: TBA

=== Quarter-finals ===
16 November 2008
14:00 GMT

Brickey Rangers	1–06 – 2–10	Clashmore
O. Casey 1–0; C. Shalloe 0–2; S. McGrath 0–2; R. Halpin 0–1; D. O'Neill 0–1	(Report)	S. Fleming 1–3; K. O'Keeffe 1–2; D. Allen 0–2; B. O'Halloran 0–2; K. O'Keeffe 0–1

Ardmore, County Waterford
Referee: Bryan Power

15 November 2008
14:00 GMT

Ardmore	0–07 – 1–13	The Nire
C. Hennessy 0–3; N. Hennessy 0–1; R. Hennessy 0–1; A. North 0–1; C. Hennessy 0–1	(Report)	M. O'Gorman 1–1; S. Walsh 0–4; M. Walsh 0–4; B. Wall 0–3; L. Lawlor 0–1

Cappoquin, County Waterford
Referee: Tommy O'Sullivan

23 November 2008
14:00 GMT

Ballinacourty	3–09 – 2–05	Rinn Ó gCuanach
G. Hurney 1–3; P. Hurney 1–1; L. Hurney 1–1; M. Fives 0–2; R. Foley 0–2	(Report)	S. Ó Ceallaigh 1–0; L. Ó Cuirrin 1–0; M. Ó Toibin 0–3; E. Breathnach 0–1; L. Ó Lionain 0–1

Fraher Field, Dungarvan
Referee: Pat Casey

1 November 2008
14:00 GMT

Stradbally	0–16 – 0–08	St. Saviours
S. Cunningham 0–6; J. Hearne 0–3; T. Costello 0–2; M. Walsh 0–2; S. Ahearne 0–2; T. Connors 0–1	(Report)	S. Corcoran 0–4; J.P. Jacob 0–2; D. Murphy 0–1; B. Power 0–1

Kill, County Waterford
Referee: Tadhg Ó Broin

=== Semi-finals ===
29 November 2008
14:00 GMT

Clashmore	0–10 – 0–13	The Nire
B. O'Halloran 0–4; S. Fleming 0–2; Cillian O'Keeffe 0–1; Kieran Connery 0–1; Fintan Walsh 0–1; Karl O'Keeffe 0–1	(Report)	S. Walsh 0–6; B. Wall 0–3; M. Walsh 0–2; L. Lawlor 0–1; M. Moore 0–1

Fraher Field, Dungarvan
Referee: Tadhg Ó Broin

30 November 2008
14:00 GMT

Ballinacourty	2–09 – 0–08	Stradbally
M. Fives 1–2; J. Mahoney 0–4; G. Hurney 1–0; P. Hurney 0–1; J. Gorman 0–1; R. Foley 0–1	(Report)	N. Curran 0–4; J. Hearne 0–2; M. Walsh 0–1

Fraher Field, Dungarvan
Referee: Maurice Condon

==== Final ====
7 December 2008
14:00 GMT

The Nire	0–12 – 0–08	Ballinacourty
B Wall (0–6); S Walsh (0–4); R Fenton (0–1); M Moore (0–1)	(Report)	G. Hurney 0–2; S. O'Hare 0–2; J. Gorman 0–2; P. Hurney 0–1; C. Keane 0–1

Fraher Field, Dungarvan
Referee: T O’Sullivan, Cappoquin

The Nire	Ballinacourty

THE NIRE GAA:
1	T Flynn
2	J McGrath
3	T O’Gorman
4	M O’Gorman
5	J Moore
6	D Ryan
7	P Prendergast
8	S Walsh
9	B Wall
10	D Wall
11	M O’Gorman
12	C Power
13	L Lawlor
14	R Fenton
15	M Moore

BALLINACOURTY GAA
1	S Enright
2	J Mullen
3	J Phelan
4	G Breen
5	T Murray
6	J Hurney
7	M Gorman
8	S O’Hare
9	P Lynch
10	P Hurney
11	L Hurney
12	J Gorman
13	M Fives
14	G Hurney
15	C Keane
