= Waterford county football team =

Gaelic football team

Waterford
- Sport: Football
- Irish: Port Láirge
- Nickname(s): The Déise
- County board: Waterford GAA
- Manager: Ephie Fitzgerald

Recent competitive record
- Current All-Ireland status: Munster (QF) in 2025
- Last championship title: 1898
- Current NFL Division: 4 (8th in 2025)
- Last league title: None
First colours

The Waterford county football team represents Waterford in men's Gaelic football and is governed by Waterford GAA, the county board of the Gaelic Athletic Association. The team competes in the three major annual inter-county competitions; the All-Ireland Senior Football Championship, the Munster Senior Football Championship and the National Football League.

Waterford's home ground is Fraher Field, Dungarvan and Walsh Park, Waterford. The team's manager is Ephie Fitzgerald.

The team last won the Munster Senior Championship in 1898, but has never won the All-Ireland Senior Championship or the National League.

== History ==
The team's greatest achievement is reaching the 1898 All-Ireland Senior Football Championship Final, a game which was lost to Dublin by a scoreline of 2–8 to 0–4. Erin's Hope of Dungarvan represented the county in that game.

In 1999 and 2004, the team won the All-Ireland Junior Football Championship (JFC).

In 2003, Waterford unexpectedly won a Munster Under-21 Football Championship, defeating Kerry in the final.

Waterford has not reached a Munster Senior Football Championship (SFC) final since 1960, has not defeated Kerry since 1957, Cork since 1960 and Limerick since 1981. On 20 May 2007, the team broke a 19-year run without a senior championship win by defeating Clare at Fraher Field, Dungarvan, by a scoreline of 1–6 to 0–7. Manager John Kiely's starting team consisted of: Tom Wall; Justin Walsh, Thomas O'Gorman, Shane Briggs; John Phelan, Edmond Rockett, Paul Ogle; Mick Ahern, John Hurney; Brian Wall, Gary Hurney, Ger Power; Wayne Hennessy, Andy Hubbord and Liam O'Lonain.

The team defeated Clare again in 2010.

On 7 April 2024, the team beat Tipperary for the first time since 1988, in the Munster quarter-final, but were beaten by Clare in the Munster semi-final. Waterford have still the longest record without an appearance in a Munster final.

League promotion

In 2010, after going so close to promotion in previous years Waterford went unbeaten in the league (defeating Leitrim, London, Kilkenny, Limerick, Clare and Wicklow and securing draws against Longford and Carlow), but fell short in the final against Limerick at Croke Park.

== Panel ==
Team as per Waterford vs Cork in the Munster SFC quarter-final, 27 May 2017

No.	Player	Position	Club
1	Stephen Enright	Goalkeeper	Ballinacourty
2	Brian Looby	Right corner back	Ballinacourty
3	Thomas O'Gorman	Full back	The Nire
4	Tadhg Ó hÚallacháin	Left corner back	An Rinn
5	James McGrath	Right half back	The Nire
6	Stephen Prendergast	Centre back	Kilrossanty
7	Ray Ó Ceallaigh	Left half back	An Rinn
8	Tommy Prendergast	Midfield	Kilrossanty
9	Michael Curry	Midfield	Rathgormack
10	Michael O'Halloran	Right half forward	Ballinacourty
11	Paul Whyte^{RET}	Centre forward	Kilrossanty (c)
12	Conor Murray	Left half forward	Rathgormack
13	Donie Breathnach	Right corner forward	An Rinn
14	Joey Veale	Full forward	Kilrossanty
15	Gavin Crotty	Left corner forward	Dungarvan

No.	Player	Position	Club
16	David Whitty	Substitute	Gaultier
17	Jason Curry	Substitute	Rathgormack
18	Stephen Dalton	Substitute	De La Salle
19	Frank Galvin	Substitute	Portlaw
20	Dylan Guiry	Substitute	The Nire
21	Kieran Murphy	Substitute	St. Saviours
22	Lorcan Ó Corroain	Substitute	An Rinn
23	Fearghal Ó Cuirrin	Substitute	An Rinn
24	Aidan Trihy	Substitute	Clashmore-Kinsalebeg
25	Paul Walsh	Substitute	Kilgobinet
26	Pa Whyte	Substitute	Kilrossanty

^{INJ} Player has had an injury which has affected recent involvement with the county team.
^{RET} Player has since retired from the county team.
^{WD} Player has since withdrawn from the county team due to a non-injury issue.

== Management team ==
- Manager: Ephie Fitzgerald
- Selectors:

== Managerial history ==
This is a list of people who have managed the Waterford county football team.

Dates	Name	Origin
?–98	Joe Curran	?
1998–99	John Cummins	
1999–01	Greg Fives	Abbeyside/Ballinacourty
2001–03	Denis Walsh	
2003–04	Billy Harty	?
2004–09	John Kiely	Kilrossanty
2009–12	John Owens	
2012–14	Niall Carew	
2014–18	Tom McGlinchey	
2018–20	Benji Whelan	Kilmacthomas
2021	Shane Ronayne	
2021–23	Ephie Fitzgerald	
2023–25	Paul Shankey	
2025–	Ephie Fitzgerald (2)	

== Players ==
=== Records ===
- Goalkeeper Darren Mulhearne made his championship debut at the age of 46 in 2019.

=== All Stars ===
Waterford has no All Stars.

== Honours ==
=== National ===
- All-Ireland Junior Football Championship
  - (gold) Winners (2): 1999, 2004

=== Provincial ===
- Munster Senior Football Championship
  - (gold) Winners (1): 1898
  - (silver) Runners-up (9): 1891, 1896, 1904, 1908, 1911, 1940, 1946, 1957, 1960
- Munster Junior Football Championship
  - (gold) Winners (3): 1948, 1999, 2004
- Munster Under-21 Football Championship
  - (gold) Winners (1): 2003
- McGrath Cup
  - (gold) Winners (2): 1981, 2015

== Rivalries ==
- Clare–Waterford Gaelic football rivalry
- Cork–Waterford Gaelic football rivalry
- Kerry–Waterford Gaelic football rivalry
- Limerick–Waterford Gaelic football rivalry
- Tipperary–Waterford Gaelic football rivalry
