= 2017 Waterford Senior Football Championship =

Waterford S.F.C.
- Season: 2017
- Champions: Stradbally (19th S.F.C. Title)
- Relegated: Ballinameela

The 2017 Waterford Senior Football Championship was the 130th edition of the Waterford GAA's premier club Gaelic football tournament for senior graded clubs in County Waterford, Ireland.

The tournament consists of 12 teams, with the winners representing Waterford in the Munster Senior Club Football Championship. The championship starts with a seeded group stage and then progresses to a knock out stage.

The Nire/Fourmilewater were the defending champions after they defeated Abbeyside/Ballinacourty in the 2016 final.

This was Portlaw's return to the senior grade.

Ballinameela were relegated to the 2018 I.F.C. after just two seasons as a senior club.

== Team changes ==
The following teams have changed division since the 2016 championship season.

=== To S.F.C. ===
Promoted from 2016 Waterford Intermediate Football Championship

- Portlaw – (Intermediate Champions)

=== From S.F.C. ===
Relegated to 2017 Waterford Intermediate Football Championship

- Saint Saviours

== Rounds 1 to 4 ==
=== Round 1 ===
All 12 teams enter the championship at this stage. The 6 winners enter the draw for Round 2A while the 6 losers enter Round 2B.

5 May 2017; 20:00; First round	The Nire	0-9 – 0-8	Clashmore	Fraher Field; Referee: Pat Casey (Affane); Man of the Match: Shane Walsh
5 May 2017; 20:00; First round	Shane Walsh 0-5 (0-2f), Darren Guiry 0-3, Craig Guiry 0-1		Brian O'Halloran 0-4 (0-1f, 1 '45), Declan Allen 0-2, Ed O'Halloran and Paul O'Connor 0-1 each	Fraher Field; Referee: Pat Casey (Affane); Man of the Match: Shane Walsh

6 May 2017; 19:00; First round	Kilrossanty	3-8 – 1-11	Gaultier	Kill; Referee: Alan Kissane (Dunhill); Man of the Match: Joey Veale
6 May 2017; 19:00; First round	Joey Veale 2-2, Tommy Prendergast 1-0, Paul Whyte 0-3 (0-2f), Conor Hayes 0-2, James Whyte 0-1		JJ Hutchinson 1-7 (1-0 pen, 0-3f), Billy O'Keefe 0-2, Sean Whitty (1 '45) and David Jones 0-1 each	Kill; Referee: Alan Kissane (Dunhill); Man of the Match: Joey Veale

6 May 2017; 19:30; First round	Stradbally	1-19 – 1-9	Ardmore	Leamybrien; Referee: Nicky O'Toole (St. Paul's)
6 May 2017; 19:30; First round	Robert Aherne 1-3, Michael Sweeney 0-6 (0-4f), Eoin O'Brien 0-3, Daniel Weldon and Paul Tobin 0-2 each, Shane Aherne, Michael Walsh, Ger Crowley 0-1 each		Sean Barron 1-2 (1-0 pen, 0-2f), John Gartland 0-3f, Niall Hennessy, Seamus Keating, Kenny Murphy, Stephen Keating 0-1 each	Leamybrien; Referee: Nicky O'Toole (St. Paul's)

7 May 2017; 13:30; First round	Ballinameela	2-6 – 0-7	Portlaw	Leamybrien; Referee: Dessie O'Leary (Erin's Own); Man of the Match: Jim Curran
7 May 2017; 13:30; First round	Jim Curran 1-2, Tom Curran 1-1, Mikey Phelan 0-2f, Michael Shine 0-1		Michael Donnolly 0-3 (0-1f), DJ Foran 0-2f, Niall Fitzgerald and Gary Morahan 0-1 each	Leamybrien; Referee: Dessie O'Leary (Erin's Own); Man of the Match: Jim Curran

7 May 2017; 15:15; First round	Ballinacourty	2-8 – 0-11	Rathgormack	Leamybrien; Referee: Anthony Fitzgerald (Gaultier); Man of the Match: Patrick Hurney
7 May 2017; 15:15; First round	Mark Ferncombe 2-1, Patrick Hurney 0-5 (0-2f), David Looby 0-2 (0-1f, 1 '45)		Jason Gleeson 0-5, Ronan Cahill, Michael Curry, Robbie Flynn, Conor Murray, Jason Curry, Paul Drohan 0-1 each	Leamybrien; Referee: Anthony Fitzgerald (Gaultier); Man of the Match: Patrick Hurney

7 May 2017; 19:00; First round	An Rinn	1-13 – 0-10	Brickey Rangers	Fraher Field; Referee: Tom Dee (John Mitchels); Man of the Match: Fearghal Ó Cuirrin
7 May 2017; 19:00; First round	Fearghal Ó Cuirrin 1-4, Liam Ó Lonain 0-4, Donie Breathnach 0-2 (0-1f), Jame De Baruin, Lorcan Ó Corraoin, Corey De Roiste 0-1 each		Cormac O'Grady 0-5 (0-1f), Conor McGrath 0-3, Carthach Shalloe 0-2f	Fraher Field; Referee: Tom Dee (John Mitchels); Man of the Match: Fearghal Ó Cuirrin

=== Round 2 ===
==== Round 2A ====
30 July 2017; 18:30	An Rinn	0-16 – 2-4	Ballinacourty	Fraher Field; Referee: Tommy O'Sullivan (Affane); Man of the Match: Lorcan Ó Corraoin
30 July 2017; 18:30	Corey De Roiste 0-5f, Lorcan Ó Corraoin and Liam Ó Lonain 0-3 each, Fearghal Ó Cuirrin 0-2, Ray Ó Cellaigh, Donie Breathnach, Paddy Ó Murchadha 0-1 each		Mark Ferncombe 2-1 (1-0 pen), Patrick Hurney (0-1f), Gary Hurney, John Elsted 0-1 each	Fraher Field; Referee: Tommy O'Sullivan (Affane); Man of the Match: Lorcan Ó Corraoin

30 July 2017; 20:00	Kilrossanty	2-17 – 0-4	Ballinameela	Fraher Field; Referee: Pat Casey (Affane); Man of the Match: Joey Veale
30 July 2017; 20:00	Joey Veale 1-5 (0-4f), Willie Brazil 1-2, Donal Fitzgerald, Stephen Prendergast, Paul Whyte 0-2 each, Niall Walsh, Conor Hayes, Tommy Prendergast, Alan Quinn 0-1 each		Mikey Phelan 0-2f, Shane Flavin and Cian Culloo 0-1 each	Fraher Field; Referee: Pat Casey (Affane); Man of the Match: Joey Veale

10 September 2017; 19:00	Stradbally	2-15 – 2-11	The Nire	Fraher Field; Attendance: 3,661; Referee: Anthony Fitzgerald (Gaultier); Man of the Match: Shane Aherne
10 September 2017; 19:00	Paul Tobin 1-1, Shane Aherne 0-4 (0-1f), Eoin O'Brien 0-3, Ger Crowley 1-0, Michael Walsh and Robert Aherne 0-2 each, Tony Grey, Shane Lannon, Michael Sweeney (0-1f) 0-1 each		Shane Walsh 0-4, Conor Gleeson and Tholom Guiry 1-0 each, Shane O'Meara 0-3, Jamie Barron 0-2, Dylan Guiry and Michael O'Gorman 0-1 each	Fraher Field; Attendance: 3,661; Referee: Anthony Fitzgerald (Gaultier); Man of the Match: Shane Aherne

==== Round 2B ====
27 July 2017; 20:00	Ardmore	0-15 – 0-9	Portlaw	Leamybrien; Referee: Tom Dee (John Mitchels); Man of the Match: John Gartland
27 July 2017; 20:00	Sean Barron 0-8f, John Gartland 0-4, Eoin Conway, John O'Brien, Wayne Hennessy 0-1 each		DJ Foran (0-2f, 1 '45) and Michael Donnelly (0-3f) 0-3 each, Jordi O'Sullivan 0-2, Niall Fitzgerald 0-1	Leamybrien; Referee: Tom Dee (John Mitchels); Man of the Match: John Gartland

29 July 2017; 19:30	Brickey Rangers	1-13 – 0-13	Gaultier	Leamybrien; Referee: Dessie O'Leary (Erin's Own); Man of the Match: Shane McGrath
29 July 2017; 19:30	Ryan O'Neill 1-1, Carthack Shalloe (0-1f) and Cormac O'Grady 0-3 each, Conor McGrath and Shane McGrath 0-2 each, Johnny Cooney and Kieran O'Neill 0-1 each		JJ Hutchinson 0-5 (0-2f), Caomhan Maguire 0-3, Dean Kearns 0-2, Wayne Hutchinson, Gary Cullinane, Callum O'Neill 0-1 each	Leamybrien; Referee: Dessie O'Leary (Erin's Own); Man of the Match: Shane McGrath

10 September 2017; 17:30	Rathgormack	4-19 – 0-12	Clashmore	Fraher Field; Referee: Alan Kissane (Dunhill); Man of the Match: Michael Curry
10 September 2017; 17:30	Billy Power 2-1 (1-0 pen), Michael Curry and Conor Murray (0-1f) 0-5 each, Jason Gleeson 1-2, Jason Curry 0-4 (0-2f), Stephen Curry 1-0, Paul Drohan and Jack Nugent 0-1 each		Paul O'Connor 0-5 (0-3f), Brian O'Halloran 0-4, Tadhg de Búrca, Sean Fleming, Brian Lynch 0-1 each	Fraher Field; Referee: Alan Kissane (Dunhill); Man of the Match: Michael Curry

=== Round 3 ===
14 October 2017; Round 3	Clashmore	2-19 – 1-8	Ballinameela

21 October 2017; Round 3	Ballinacourty	1-12 – 1-3	Portlaw

8 November 2017; Round 3	The Nire	w/o – scr	Gaultier

=== Round 4 ===
28 October 2017; Round 4	Ballinacourty	1-15 – 0-7	Ardmore

28 October 2017; Round 4	Clashmore	0-15 – 1-10	Brickey Rangers

12 November 2017; 3:45 pm Round 4	The Nire	0-18 – 1-8	Rathgormack	Fraher Field; Referee: Tommy O'Sullivan (Affane); Man of the Match: Seamus Lawlor
12 November 2017; 3:45 pm Round 4	Shane Walsh 0-5, Seamus Lawlor and Conor Gleeson (0-1f) 0-3 each, Michael O'Gorman and Kenny Brazil 0-2 each, Diarmuid Murphy (1 '45), Tholm Guiry, Tom Barron 0-1 each		Michael Curry 1-1, Jason Curry 0-3 (0-2f), Conor Murray 0-2, Robbie Flynn and Gavin Nugent 0-1 each	Fraher Field; Referee: Tommy O'Sullivan (Affane); Man of the Match: Seamus Lawlor

=== Round 5 ===
16 November 2017; 8:00 pm Round 5	The Nire	2-6 – 0-8	Ballinacourty	Fraher Field; Referee: Anthony Fitzgerald (Gaultier); Man of the Match: Darren Guiry
16 November 2017; 8:00 pm Round 5	Conor Gleeson 1-1, Dermot Ryan 1-0, Diarmuid Murphy (1 '45), Shane Ryan, Dylan Guiry, Shane Walsh, Shane O'Meara 0-1 each		Patrick Hurney 0-4 (0-3f), Gary Hurney 0-3, Mark Ferncombe 0-1	Fraher Field; Referee: Anthony Fitzgerald (Gaultier); Man of the Match: Darren Guiry

=== Round 6 ===
21 November 2017; 8:00 pm Round 6	The Nire	2-15 – 1-7	Clashmore	Fraher Field; Referee: Alan Kissane (Dunhill)

== Knockout stage ==
=== Semi-finals ===
26 November 2017
1:30 pm
Semi Final

The Nire	3-8 – 2-10	An Rinn

Fraher Field
Referee: Pat Casey (Affane)
26 November 2017
3:00 pm
Semi Final

Stradbally	0-13 – 0-11	Kilrossanty

Fraher Field
Referee: Tommy O'Sullivan (Affane)

=== Final ===
3 December 2017; 2:00 pm Final	Stradbally	1-15 – 1-14 aet	The Nire	Fraher Field; Referee: Anthony Fitzgerald (Gaultier); Man of the Match: Shane Aherne
3 December 2017; 2:00 pm Final	Eoin O'Brien 0-4 (0-1f), Ger Crowley 1-0, Shane Aherne 0-3, Daniel Weldon and Robert Aherne (0-1f) 0-2 each, Jack Mullaney, Michael Walsh, Tommy Connors, Michael Sweeney 0-1 each	Report	Conor Gleeson 0-8 (0-5f), Tom Barron 1-1, Shane Walsh 0-3, Diarmuid Murphy (0-1f) and Dermot Ryan 0-1 each	Fraher Field; Referee: Anthony Fitzgerald (Gaultier); Man of the Match: Shane Aherne

== Relegation Playoff ==
=== Relegation Semi-Final ===
26 November 2017
Relegation Playoff

Gaultier	2-11 – 2-9	Ballinameela

Leamybrien

=== Relegation Final ===
13 January 2018
Relegation Playoff

Portlaw	1-8 – 0-11	Ballinameela

Ballinacourty
20 January 2018
Relegation Final Replay

Portlaw	3-9 – 0-8	Ballinameela

Ballinacourty
