= 2009 Waterford Senior Football Championship =

Tournament details
- County: Waterford
- Year: 2009

Winners
- Champions: Stradbally
- Manager: Incumbent
- Captain: Incumbent

Promotion/Relegation
- Relegated team(s): Clashmore

Other
- Player of the Year: Incumbent

The 2009 Waterford Senior Football Championship, the most recent championship of the Waterford Senior Football Championship, the premier Gaelic Football competition in County Waterford, commenced on 16 May 2009 and concluded on 1 November 2009. The thirteen teams in the championship were structured into two groups of four teams and one group of five teams. From these groups, quarter finals and semi-finals were played with the county final being played in Fraher Field. The championship was won by Stradbally, which defeated The Nire in the final.

== Group A ==
=== Standings ===
P	Team	Pld	W	D	L	PF	PA	PD	Pts
1	The Nire	1	1	0	0	28	14	14	2
2	Kilrossanty	1	1	0	0	13	9	+4	2
3	Ardmore	2	1	0	1	21	20	+1	2
4	An Rinn	0	0	0	0	0	0	0	0
5	St Brendan's	2	0	0	2	21	40	-19	0

Qualification
Qualified for quarter-finals
Qualified for round of 16
Entered for relegation playoff

=== Matches ===
16 May 2009
Round 1

Ardmore	0-12 - 0-07	St Brendan's
W. Hennessy 0-6; A. North 0-4; C. Hennessy 0-2	(Report)	R. Hennessy 0-2; P. Dunphy 0-2; A. Hubbard 0-2; N. Hennessy 0-1

Fraher Field, Dungarvan
Referee: Maurice Condon

30 May 2009
Round 2

Ardmore	0-09 - 1-10	Kilrossanty
J. Hennessy 0-4; W. Hennessy 0-4; A. North 0-1	(Report)	P. Whyte 1-7; J. Veale 0-1; T. Prendergast 0-1

Fraher Field, Dungarvan
Referee: Pat Casey

31 May 2009
Round 2

The Nire	3-19 - 2-08	St Brendan's
S. Walsh 0-8; M. Moore 2-0; M. Walsh 1-1; B. Wall 0-3; L. Lawlor 0-3; R. Fenton 0-2; M. O'Gorman 0-2	(Report)	A. Hubbard 1-0; A. Kiely 1-0; R. Hennessy 0-1; R. Walsh 0-1; M. Ahearne 0-2; N. Hennessy 0-1; D. Casey 0-1

Fraher Field, Dungarvan
Referee: Maurice Condon

5 September 2009
Round 4

Rinn Ua gCuanach	0-11 - 1-08	Kilrossanty
	(Report)

Cappoquin
Referee: ?? ??

== Group B ==
=== Standings ===
P	Team	Pld	W	D	L	PF	PA	PD	Pts
1	Ballinacourty	3	3	0	0	54	22	+32	6
2	Rathgormack	3	1	1	1	38	28	+10	3
3	St. Saviours	3	1	0	2	20	52	-32	2
4	Brickey Rangers	3	0	1	2	27	37	-10	1

Qualification
Qualified for quarter-finals
Qualified for round of 16
Entered for relegation playoff

=== Matches ===
29 May 2009
Round 1

Brickey Rangers	0-06 - 0-06	Rathgormack
C. Shalloe 0-2; C. McGrath 0-1; C. Power 0-1; O. Casey 0-1; J. Sheehan 0-1	(Report)	K. Power 0-2; R. Power 0-2; P. Whelan 0-1; E. Hogan 0-1

Leamybrien, County Waterford
Referee: Tim O'Byrne

30 May 2009
Round 1

Ballinacourty	2-13 - 0-02	St. Saviours
M. Ferncombe 2-0; P. Hurney 0-4; J. O'Mahoney 0-4; G. Hurney 0-2; M. Fives 0-1; L. Hurney 0-1; J. O'Brien 0-1	(Report)	J.P. Jacob 0-1; B. Power 0-1

Kill, County Waterford
Referee: Pat Casey

26 June 2009
Round 2

St. Saviours	1-11 - 0-11	Brickey Rangers
S Corcoran 0-5 (0-4f); B Jacob 1-0; A Brophy 0-3 (0-1 45); M O’Brien 0-1; JP Jacob 0-1; B Power 0-1	(Report)	C Shalloe 0-5; C Power 0-3; C McGrath 0-1; M Shalloe 0-1; J Sheehan 0-1

Kill, County Waterford
Referee: ??

27 June 2009
Round 2

Ballinacourty	3-9 - 1-7	Rathgormack
L. Hurney 1-1; S. O’Hare 1-0; R. Foley 1-0; J. O’Mahony 0-3 (frees); J. Gorman 0-3; M. Ferncombe 0-1; M. Fives 0 - 1	(Report)	P. Whelan 1-1 (1-0 pen 0-1 free); R. Power 0-2; K. Power 0-1; P. Drohan 0-1; P. Power 0-1; E. Hogan 0-1 (free)

Kilmacthomas, County Waterford
Referee: Maurice Condon

5 September 2009
Round 3

Ballinacourty	2-11 - 1-7	Brickey Rangers
M. Gorman 1-2; G. Hurney 0-5; M. Fives 1-0; P. Hurney 0-3; J. Gorman 0-1	(Report)	M. Shalloe 0-4; M. Gee 1-0; C. McGrath 0-2; C. Shalloe 0-1

Fraher Field
Referee: Tim O'Byrne

5 September 2009
Round 3

Rathgormack	3-13 - 0-4	St. Saviours
	(Report)

Kilmacthomas, County Waterford
Referee: Pat Casey

== Group C ==
=== Standings ===
P	Team	Pld	W	D	L	PF	PA	PD	Pts
1	Stradbally	1	1	0	0	17	9	+8	2
2	Tramore	1	1	0	0	14	12	+2	2
3	Gaultier	1	0	0	1	12	14	-2	0
4	Clashmore	1	0	0	1	9	17	-8	0

Qualification
Qualified for quarter-finals
Qualified for round of 16
Entered for relegation playoff

=== Matches ===
30 May 2009
Round 1

Clashmore	0-09 - 1-14	Stradbally
B. O'Halloran 0-5; K. O'Keeffe 0-1; C. O'Keeffe 0-1; J. Prendergast 0-1; S. Fleming 0-1	(Report)	N. Curran 0-7; S. Cunningham 0-3; R. Ahearne 1-0; S. Ahearne 0-1; T. Connors 0-1; J. Hearne 0-1; A. Doyle 0-1

Fraher Field, Dungarvan
Referee: Tommy O'Sullivan

30 May 2009
Round 1

Gaultier	1-09 - 1-11	Tramore
A. FitzGerald 0-4; G. O'Connor 1-1; P. Maher 0-2; P. FitzGerald 0-1; D. Smith 0-1	(Report)	L. Quilty 0-4; M. Power 1-0; M. Whelan 0-2; D. King 0-2; D. Ormond 0-1; C. Duffy 0-1; P. Ogle 0-1

Walsh Park, Waterford
Referee: Domhnall O’Murchadha

27 June 2009
Round 2

Gaultier	2-05 - 0-11	Stradbally
G. O'Connor 2-0; A. FitzGerald 0-2; P. Fitzgerald 0-1; JJ. Hutchinson 0-1	(Report)	N Curran 0-5 (0-1f); S Ahearne 0-2; J Hearne 0-2; S Cunningham 0-1; R Ahearne 0-1

Kill, Waterford

5 September 2009
Round 3

Gaultier	0-11 - 0-11	Clashmore
	(Report)

Stradbally, Waterford

== Round of 16 ==
15 September 2009
Quarter-Final play-off

Gaultier	1-9 - 0-9	St. Saviours
	(Report)

Venue: Kilmacthomas
Referee: ??

== Relegation play-offs ==
19 September 2009
Relegation play-off, Semi-Final

Rinn Ua gCuanach	0-10 - 0-9	Clashmore

Venue: Ardmore
Referee: Tommy O'Sullivan
26 September 2009
Relegation play-off, Final

Brickey Rangers	0-17 - 2-11	Clashmore

Venue: Ardmore
Referee: John Condon
3 October 2009
Relegation play-off, Final (Replay)

Brickey Rangers	0-12 - 1-8	Clashmore

Venue: Ardmore
Referee: John Condon

== Knockout stages ==
Quarterfinals
Tramore	0-14
Kilrossanty	0-16
Stradbally	3-8
Ardmore	1-9
Ballinacourty	1-12
Gaultier	0-8
The Nire	1-17
Rathgormack	1-11

Semifinals
Kilrossanty	0-6
Stradbally	0-12
Ballinacourty	1-5
The Nire	1-7

Final
Stradbally	2-5
The Nire	0-9
