= Jamie Barron =

Irish hurler

Personal information
- Native name: Séamie Barún (Irish)
- Born: 21 October 1993 (age 33) Waterford, Ireland
- Occupation: Primary school teacher
- Height: 5 ft 9 in (175 cm)

Sport
- Sport: Hurling
- Position: Midfield
Club
- Years: Club
- 2012-present: The Nire–Fourmilewater
Club titles
	Football	Hurling
Waterford titles	3	0
College
- Years: College
- University College Cork
College titles
- Fitzgibbon titles: 0
Inter-county*
Years	County	Apps (scores)
2013-present	Waterford	30 (3-33)
Inter-county titles
- Munster titles: 0
- All-Irelands: 0
- NHL: 1
- All Stars: 3
- *Inter County team apps and scores correct as of 18:08, 29 March 2020.

Jamie Barron (21 October 1993) is an Irish hurler who plays for Waterford Senior Championship club The Nire–Fourmilewater and at inter-county level with the Waterford senior hurling team. He usually lines out as a midfielder.

== Playing career ==
=== University College Cork ===
Barron studied Food Business at University College Cork and joined the senior hurling team in his second year at the university. He was a regular player in several Fitzgibbon Cup campaigns.

=== The Nire–Fourmilewater ===
Barron joined The Nire–Fourmilewater club at a young age and played in all grades at juvenile and underage levels as a dual player before eventually joining the club's top adult teams in Gaelic football and hurling.

On 11 November 2012, Barron was at left wing-forward when the Nire faced Stradbally in the Waterford Senior Championship final. He was held scoreless for the game which the Nire eventually lost by 1–08 to 0–10.

On 19 October 2014, Barron was at left wing-forward when the Nire defeated Stradbally by 0–11 to 0–06 to win the Waterford Championship. He lined out in the same position when the Nire faced Austin Stacks in the Munster final on 30 November 2014. Barron ended on the losing side following a 3–05 to 2–04 defeat.

Barron lined out at left wing-back when the Nire faced Ballinacourty in the Waterford Senior Championship final on 6 November 2016. He ended the game with a second winners' medal following the 1–17 to 0–08 victory. Barron was switched to centre-back for the Munster final on 27 November 2016, which the Nire lost to Dr Crokes by 3–15 to 0-06.

On 28 October 2018, Barron lined out in a fifth Waterford Senior Championship final. He scored a point from right wing-forward and collected a third winners' medal following the 0–09 to 0–07 defeat of Kilrossanty.

=== Waterford ===
==== Minor and under-21 ====
Barron first lined out for Waterford as a member of the minor team during the 2010 Munster Championship. He made his first appearance for the team on 28 April 2010 when he lined out at right corner-back in a 1–21 to 0–16 defeat of Clare. Barron was again at right wing-back when Waterford suffered a 1–16 to 1–11 defeat by Clare in the Munster final.

On 10 July 2011, Barron was at right corner-back when Waterford faced Clare in a second successive Munster final. He ended the game on the losing side following a 1–20 to 3–09 defeat.

Barron joined the Waterford under-21 team in advance of the 2012 Munster Championship. He made his first appearance on 19 July 2012 when he lined out at right corner-back in a 2–22 to 0–09 defeat by Clare.

During the 2013 Munster Championship, Barron made the transition from a defender to a forward. He made his only appearance for the team that season on 18 July when he played at left corner-forward in a 2–15 to 0–17 defeat by Clare.

Barron was eligible for the under-21 team for a third a final season in 2014. He made his final appearance in the grade on 16 July 2014 in a 3–18 to 0–16 defeat by Cork.

==== Senior ====
Barron was added to the Waterford senior panel prior to the start of the 2013 National League. He made his first appearance for the team on 23 February 2013 when he came on as a 43rd-minute substitute in a 2–15 to 1–17 defeat of Clare. Barron made his Munster Championship debut on 2 June 2013 when he scored 0-01 from right corner-forward in a 2–20 to 1–15 defeat by Clare.

On 3 May 2015, Barron was selected at midfield when Waterford faced Cork in the National League final. He scored 0-01 from play and collected a winners' medal following the 1–24 to 0–17 victory. On 12 July 2015, Barron was again at midfield when Waterford were beaten for the fourth time in six seasons by Tipperary in the Munster final.

On 1 May 2016, Barron was at midfield when Waterford lined out in the National League final. He scored 0-01 from play as Waterford drew 0-22 apiece with Clare. He retained his midfield position for the replay, which Waterford lost by 1–23 to 2–19. On 10 July 2016, he was again at midfield when Waterford suffered a 5–19 to 0–13 defeat by Tipperary in the Munster final. Barron ended the season by being named on the All-Star team.

On 3 September 2017, Barron was selected at midfield when Waterford faced Galway in the All-Ireland final. He ended the game as a runner-up following Galway's 0–26 to 2–17 victory. Barron ended the season by securing a second successive All-Star award.

On 31 March 2019, Barron was named at midfield when Waterford faced Limerick in the National League final. He ended the game on the losing side following a 1–24 to 0–19 defeat.

=== Munster ===
Barron was called up to the Munster inter-provincial team in advance of the 2016 Inter-provincial Championship. He made his first appearance for the team on 11 December 2016 when he lined out at midfield in a 3–21 to 0–15 defeat of Ulster. On 15 December 2016, Barron won a Railway Cup medal after scoring a point from midfield in Munster's 2–20 to 2–16 defeat of Leinster in the final.

== Career statistics ==
As of match played 28 November 2020.

Team	Year	National League			Munster		All-Ireland		Total	
Team	Year	Division	Apps	Score	Apps	Score	Apps	Score	Apps	Score
Waterford	2013	Division 1A	5	1-02	1	0-01	3	0-02	9	1-05
Waterford	2014	Division 1A	3	0-01	0	0-00	0	0-00	3	0-01
Waterford	2015	Division 1B	8	0-05	2	0-00	2	0-00	12	0-05
Waterford	2016	Division 1A	8	0-07	2	0-00	3	0-05	13	0-12
Waterford	2017	Division 1A	3	0-03	1	0-02	5	3-09	9	3-14
Waterford	2018	Division 1A	5	0-05	3	0-04	—		8	0-09
Waterford	2019	Division 1B	6	0-09	4	0-04	—		10	0-13
Waterford	2020	Division 1A	2	0-03	2	0-03	2	0-03	6	0-09
Career total			40	1-35	15	0-14	15	3-19	70	4-68

== Honours ==
The Nire

- Waterford Senior Football Championship (3): 2014, 2016, 2018

Waterford

- National Hurling League (1): 2015

Munster

- Railway Cup (1): 2016

Individual

- All Star Award (3): 2016, 2017, 2020
