= 2008 Waterford Senior Hurling Championship =

Annual hurling competition season

Waterford Senior Hurling Championship 2008
Waterford Champions
Winners	De La Salle
Captain	John Mullane
Manager	Eoin Dunphy
Player of the year	John Mullane
Relegated	Ardmore

The 2008 Waterford Senior Hurling Championship is the current championship of the Waterford Senior Hurling Championship having commenced on 27 April 2008. There are 12 teams in the championship, structured into 3 groups of four teams. From these groups, quarter finals, and semi-finals will be played with a county final being played in either Walsh Park or Fraher Field. Ballyduff Upper are the defending champions having beaten Ballygunner in 2007.

De La Salle won their first Waterford Senior Hurling Championship after an 11 to 8 points win against Abbeyside played in very bad condition at Fraher Field, Dungarvan.

== Group A ==
=== Standings ===
P	Team	Pld	W	D	L	PF	PA	PD	Pts
1	Tallow	3	1	1	1	54	46	+8	3
2	Fourmilewater	3	1	1	1	47	43	+4	3
3	Stradbally	3	1	1	1	41	43	−2	3
4	Ballyduff Upper	3	1	1	1	45	55	−10	3

Qualification
Qualified for quarter-finals
Qualified for round of 16
Entered for relegation playoff

=== Matches ===
27 April 2008
Round 1

Fourmilewater	2–11 – 0–09	Stradbally
S. Walsh 2–2; R. Fenton 0–8; B. Wall 0–1	(Report)	T. Curran 0–3; M. Walsh 0–2; S. Cunningham 0–2; N. Curran 0–1; T. Costello 0–1

Fraher Field, Dungarvan
Referee: John M. Kelly

27 April 2008
Round 1

Tallow	3–16 – 0–14	Ballyduff Upper
P. Kearney 0–7 (4f); L. McCarthy 1–2; P. O'Brien 0–4; B. Sheehan 1–0; B. Henley 1–0; W. Henley 0–1; T. Ryan 0–1; P. Murray 0–1	(Report)	B. Hannon 0–11 (11f); S. Kearney 0–1; J. Kearney 0–2

Cappoquin, County Waterford
Referee: Maurice Condon

5 May 2008
Round 2

Ballyduff Upper	0–11 – 0–11	Stradbally
B. Hannon 0–9 (7f + 1 "65"); P. Kearney 0–1; K. Geary 0–1	(Report)	M. Walsh 0–9 (6f); G. Walsh 0–1; N. Curran 0–1

Fraher Field, Dungarvan
Referee: John Condon

5 May 2008
Round 2

Tallow	1–11 – 0–14	Fourmilewater
P. Kearney 0–5; T. Ryan 1–1; P. O'Brien 0–3; P. Murray 0–1; W. Henley 0–1	(Report)	R. Fenton 0–10; S. Walsh 0–2; T. O'Gorman 0–1; M. Walsh 0–1

Fraher Field, Dungarvan
Referee: Dessie O'Leary

20 September 2008
Round 3

Ballyduff Upper	1–17 – 0–16	Fourmilewater
B. Hannon 0–10; S. Cunningham 1–0; S. Kearney 0–2; P. Kearney 0–2; B. Kearney 0–1; K. Geary 0–1	(Report)	R. Fenton 0–7; S. Lawlor 0–2; T. Walsh 0–2; M. Walsh 0–1; M. O'Gorman 0–1; S. Walsh 0–1; M. O'Gorman 0–1; B. Wall 0–1

Fraher Field, Dungarvan
Referee: Tommy O'Sullivan

20 September 2008
Round 3

Stradbally	3–12 – 1–12	Tallow
S. Ahearne 2–5; G. Walsh 1–0; M. Walsh 0–3; N. Curran 0–1; S. Cunningham 0–1; J. Hearne 0–1; T. Costello 0–1	(Report)	T. Ryan 0–7; P. O'Brien 1–3; W. Henley 0–1; S. F. McCarthy 0–1

Cappoquin, County Waterford
Referee: Maurice Condon

==== 3rd and 4th Place Playoff ====
5 October 2008
Playoff
14:30

Ballyduff Upper	1–21 – 1–14	Stradbally
B. Hannon 0–8; S. Kearney 1–1; P. Kearney 0–4; S. Molumphy 0–2; S. Hannon 0–2; B. Kearney 0–1; G. Feeney 0–1; S. Twomey 0–1; J. Kearney 0–1	(Report)	S. Ahearne 0–7; N. Curran 1–2; J. Coffey 0–2; S. Cunningham 0–2; R. Ahearne 0–1

Fraher Field, Dungarvan
Referee: Maurice Condon

== Group B ==
=== Standings ===
P	Team	Pld	W	D	L	PF	PA	PD	Pts
1	De La Salle	3	2	1	0	65	47	+18	5
2	Ballygunner	3	2	0	1	59	49	+10	4
3	Ballyduff Lower	3	1	1	1	48	54	−6	3
4	Ardmore	3	0	0	3	36	58	−22	0

Qualification
Qualified for quarter-finals
Qualified for round of 16
Entered into relegation playoff

=== Matches ===
27 April 2008
Round 1

Ballygunner	3–15 – 2–08	Ballyduff Lower
M. Kearney 2–2; S. Power 1–2 (0-2f); S. O'Sullivan 0–5 (2f); G. O'Connor 0–2; JJ Hutchinson 0–2; A. Moloney 0–1; D. O'Sullivan 0–1	(Report)	P. Stephenson 2–0; J. Kenneddy 0–4; P. Fitzgerald 0–2; N. Power 0–1; G. Harris 0–1

Walsh Park, Waterford
Referee: Domhnall O Murchadha

27 April 2008
Round 1

De La Salle	1–21 – 1–09	Ardmore
J. Quirke 1–7; J. Mullane 0–7; C. Watt 0–2; D. Twomey 0–2; K. Moran 0–1; D. Dooley 0–1; A. O'Neill 0–1	(Report)	S. Prendergast 0–6; G. North 1–0; D. Hennessy 0–2; E. Foley 0–1

Fraher Field, Dungarvan
Referee: Vincent O’Toole

5 May 2008
Round 2

Ballygunner	0–17 – 1–08	Ardmore
S. Power 0–6 (6f); S. O'Sullivan 0–4 (3f); G. O'Connor 0–2; M. Kearney 0–2; A. Moloney 0–1; JJ Hutchinson 0–1; D O'Sullivan 0–1	(Report)	S. Prendergast 1–5 (1–0 pen + 0-4f); J. O'Donnell 0–2; C. Hennessy 0–1

Fraher Field, Dungarvan
Referee: Jim Murphy

5 May 2008
Round 2

De La Salle	2–11 – 0–17	Ballyduff Lower
J. Mullane 2–0; J. Quirke 0–7 (6f); D. Dooley 0–2; C. Watt 0–1; D. McGrath 0–1	(Report)	J. Kenneddy 0–4; P. Fitzgerald 0–4 (3f); P. Matthews 0–2; P. Stephenson 0–2; P. Murphy 0–1; N. Clifford 0–1; G. Harris 0–1; C. Kenny 0–1 (1f); P. Leahy 0–1

Walsh Park, Waterford
Referee: Bryan Power

20 September 2008
Round 3

De La Salle	2–18 – 2–12	Ballygunner
J. Mullane 1–6; J. Quirke 0–7; D. Twomey 1–1; B. Phelan 0–2; A. Kelly 0–1; P. Nevin 0–1	(Report)	P. Flynn 2–4; B. Mullane 0–2; JJ Hutchinson 0–2; J. Kearney 0–2; S. Power 0–1; M. Kearney 0–1

Walsh Park, Waterford
Referee: Pat Casey

21 September 2008
Round 3

Ballyduff Lower	1–14 – 0–13	Ardmore
N. Power 0–9; R. Power 1–0; J. Kennedy 0–3; P. Kennedy 0–1; P. Fitzgerald 0–1; P. Stephenson 0–1	(Report)	S. Prendergast 0–9; C. Hennessey 0–2; W. Hennessey 0–1; J. O'Donnell 0–1

Fraher Field, Dungarvan
Referee: Jimmy Murphy

== Group C ==
=== Standings ===
P	Team	Pld	W	D	L	PF	PA	PD	Pts
1	Lismore	3	3	0	0	66	46	+20	6
2	Abbeyside	3	2	0	1	62	46	+16	4
3	Passage	3	1	0	2	40	59	−19	2
4	Mount Sion	3	0	0	3	40	57	−17	0

Qualification
Qualified for quarter-finals
Qualified for round of 16
Entered for relegation playoff

=== Matches ===
27 April 2008
Round 1

Lismore	2–19 – 2–08	Passage
M. Shanahan 0–12 (5f); D. Bennett 1–4 (1-3f); P. Prendergast 1–0; J. Heneghan 0–2; D. Shanahan 0–1	(Report)	E Kelly 1–4 (1-2f); C. Carey 1–1; E. Connors 0–2 (1f); A. Connors 0–1

Kill, County Waterford
Referee: Pat Casey

27 April 2008
Round 1

Abbeyside	1–21 – 0–13	Mount Sion
M. Gorman 1–5 (0-5f); M. Fives (0–4); M. Ferncombe 0–4; G. Hurney 0–3; J. Gorman 0–3; R. Foley 0–1; T. Murray 0–1	(Report)	K. McGrath 0–5; M. Frisby 0–4; E. McGrath 0–2; R. O'Keeffe 0–1; B. Cusack 0–1

Walsh Park, Waterford
Referee: T. Sullivan

5 May 2008
Round 2

Lismore	1–14 – 0–12	Mount Sion
M. Shanahan 1–7 (0-6f); D. Bennett 0–2 (1f); D. Shanahan 0–2; J. Henaghan 0–2; S. Kearney 0–1	Report)	E. McGrath 0–3 (3f); M. Frisby 0–2 (1f); K. Stafford 0–2; J. O'Farrell 0–1; M. O'Neill 0–1; K.Flynn 0–1; P. Hammond 0–1; K. McGrath 0–1 (1f)

Fraher Field, Dungarvan
Referee: Maurice Condon

5 May 2008
Round 2

Abbeyside	1–16 – 1–6	Passage
M. Gorman 0–6 (3f); J. Gorman 1–1; G. Hurney 0–3; M. Ferncombe 0–2; M. Fives 0–1; J. Foley 0–1; T. Murray 0–1	Report)	E. Connors 0–4; R. Walsh 1–1; N. Quinlan 0–1

Walsh Park, Waterford
Referee: Vincent O'Toole

21 September 2008
Round 3

Lismore	2–18 – 2–14	Abbeyside
M. Shanahan 1–8; D. Bennett 0–6; D. Shanahan 1–1; J. Shanahan 0–2; J. Heneghan 0–1	(Report)	M. Gorman 0–5; G. Hurney 1–0; J. Gorman 1–0; J. Foley 0–3; M. Ferncombe 0–2; R. Foley 0–1; M. Fives 0–1; P. Hurney 0–1; S. O'Hare 0–1

Cappoquin, County Waterford
Referee: John Condon

21 September 2008
Round 3

Passage	2–11 – 0–15	Mount Sion
E. Kelly 1–4; C. Carey 1–1; A. Connors 0–3; E. Connors 0–2; J.P. Collingwood 0–2	(Report)	K. McGrath 0–5; P. Hammond 0–2; D. Kelly 0–2; R. O'Keeffe 0–2; M. White 0–1; E. McGrath 0–1; S. Ryan 0–1; B. Cusack 0–1

Walsh Park, Waterford
Referee: Tim O'Byrne

== Relegation playoffs ==
Semi-finals
1	Ardmore	2–09
4	Stradbally	0–16
3	Mount Sion	0–00
2	Bye	0–00

Final
Ardmore	1–05
Mount Sion	3–14

=== Matches ===
Semi-final
11 October 2008
14:30

Ardmore	2–09 – 0–16	Stradbally
S. Prendergast 1–4; S. Leahy 1–1; K. Murphy 0–1; E. Foley 0–1; J. O'Donnell 0–1; C. Hennessy 0–1	(Report)	N. Curran 0–6; M. Walsh 0–5; T. Costelloe 0–2; J. Hearne 0–1; S. Ahearne 0–1; R. Ahearne 0–1

Fraher Field, Dungarvan
Referee: John Condon

Final
27 October 2008
14:00

Ardmore	1–05 – 3–14	Mount Sion
S. Prendergast 1–4; J. O'Donnell 0–1	(Report)	K. McGrath 0–8; R. O'Keeffe 2–2; E. McGrath 1–1; S. Ryan 0–1; T. Browne 0–1; J. O'Meara 0–1

Fraher Field, Dungarvan
Referee: Tim O'Byrne

== Knockout phase ==
Round of 16
Ballyduff Lower	2–11
Passage	1–12

Quarter-finals
Abbeyside	3–15
Ballyduff Lower	2–11
Ballyduff Upper	0–13
Lismore	0–12
Ballygunner	1–08
Tallow	1–10
De La Salle	1–11
Fourmilewater	0–13

Semi-finals
Abbeyside	1–19
Ballyduff Upper	0–15
Tallow	2–03
De La Salle	1–10

Final
Abbeyside	0–09
De La Salle	0–11

=== Matches ===
==== Round of 16 ====
5 October 2008
16:00

Ballyduff Lower	2–11 – 1–12	Passage
J. Kennedy 2–1; N. Power 0–5; P. Matthews 0–2; P. Kennedy 0–2; N. Clifford 0–1	(Report)	E. Connors 0–10; C. Carey 1–1; A. Connors 0–1

Walsh Park, Waterford
Referee: Tommy O'Sullivan

==== Quarter-finals ====
12 October 2008
14:00

Abbeyside	3–15 – 2–11	Ballyduff Lower
M. Gorman 0–10; M. Fives 0–3; P. Hurney 1–0; J. Foley 1–0; G. Hurney 1–0; M. Ferncombe 0–2	(Report)	N. Power 1–6; P. Matthews 1–2; J. Kennedy 0–2; N. Clifford 0–1

Walsh Park, Waterford
Referee: Maurice Condon

12 October 2008
15:30

Ballyduff Upper	0–21 – 1–18	Lismore
B. Hannon 0–9; J. Kearney 0–4; P. Kearney 0–2; B. Kearney 0–2; S. Molumphy 0–2; S. Hannon 0–1; A. Power 0–1	(Report)	D. Shanahan 1–5; M. Shanahan 0–7; D. Bennett 0–2; J. Shanahan 0–1; J. Prendergast 0–1; C. O'Gorman 0–1; A. Landers 0–1

Fraher Field, Dungarvan
Referee: Maurice Wadding

12 October 2008
14:00

Ballygunner	1–08 – 1–10	Tallow
P. Flynn 0–5; G. O'Connor 1–1; S. Walsh 0–1; S. Power 0–1	(Report)	T. Ryan 0–6; W. Henley 1–1; M. O'Brien 0–1; S. F. McCarthy 0–1; J. P. Grey 0–1

Fraher Field, Dungarvan
Referee: Tommy O'Sullivan

11 October 2008
16:00

De La Salle	1–11 – 0–13	Fourmilewater
D. Twomey 1–1; J. Mullane 0–3; J. Quirke 0–2; P. Nevin 0–2; T. Kearney 0–1; D. Greene 0–1; B. Phelan 0–1	(Report)	R. Fenton 0–7; T. Walsh 0–2; D. Spellman 0–1; M. O'Gorman 0–1; T. O'Gorman 0–1; L. Lawlor 0–1

Walsh Park, Waterford
Referee: Tim O'Byrne

Quarter-final replay
19 October 2008
15:30

Ballyduff Upper	0–13 – 0–12	Lismore
B. Hannon 0–5; S. Molumphy 0–2; J. Kearney 0–2; S. Kearney 0–2; A. Power 0–1; P. Kearney 0–1	(Report)	D. Bennett 0–2; J. Shanahan 0–2; M. Shanahan 0–2; J. Prendergast 0–2; D. Shanahan 0–1; S. Bennett 0–1; S. Daly 0–1; C. O'Gorman 0–1

Fraher Field, Dungarvan
Referee: Tim O'Byrne

==== Semi-finals ====
26 October 2008
15:30

Abbeyside	2–15 – 3–12	Ballyduff Upper
G. Hurney 1–3; M. Fives 1–3; M. Gorman 0–4; P. Hurney 0–4; J. Gorman 0–1	(Report)	P. Kearney 3–0; B. Hannon 0–5; S. Kearney 0–2; S. Molumphy 0–2; S. Hannon 0–2; J. Kearney 0–1

Fraher Field, Dungarvan
Referee: Tommy O'Sullivan

19 October 2008
14:00

Tallow	2–03 – 1–10	De La Salle
S. F. McCarthy 1–0; B. Sheehan 1–0; T. Ryan 0–3	(Report)	J. Quirke 1–4; B. Phelan 0–2; P. Nevin 0–2; K. Moran 0–1; C. Watt 0–1

Fraher Field, Dungarvan
Referee: Pat Casey

Semi-final replay
2 November 2008
14:00

Abbeyside	1–19 – 0–15	Ballyduff Upper
M. Gorman 1–9; M. Fives 0–3; R. Foley 0–3; P. Hurney 0–2; G. Hurney 0–1; J. Gorman 0–1	(Report)	B. Hannon 0–12; J. Kearney 0–1; P. Kearney 0–1; K. Geary 0–1

Fraher Field, Dungarvan
Referee: Tommy O'Sullivan

==== Final ====
9 November 2008
14:30

Abbeyside	0–09 – 0–11	De La Salle
M. Gorman 0–2; P. Hurney 0–2; M. Fives 0–2; S. O'Hare 0–1; J. Hurney 0–1; D. Fives 0–1	(Report)	P. Neville 0–3; S. Quirke 0–3; J. Mullane 0–2; B. Phelan 0–2; D. Greene 0–1

Fraher Field, Dungarvan
Referee: Tim O'Byrne

Abbeyside	De La Salle

ABBEYSIDE GAA:
1	Daryl Ryan
2	Tiernan Murray
3	Patrick Lynch
4	Gavin Breen
5	John Hurney
6	Richie Foley
7	Eoin Enright
8	John Foley
9	Sean O'Hare
10	Mark Fives
11	John Gorman
12	Patrick Hurney
13	Mark Gorman
14	Gary Hurney
15	Declan Fives
Substitutes:
16
17
18
19
20
21
22
23
24
25
26
27
28
29
30
Manager:

DE LA SALLE GAA:
1	Stephen Brenner
2	Alan Kelly
3	Ian Flynn
4	Michael Doherty
5	Darren Russell
6	Kevin Moran
7	Stephen Daniels
8	Bryan Phelan
9	Conan Watt
10	Lee Hayes
11	Brian Farrell
12	Paidi Nevin
13	Dean Twomey
14	John Mullane
15	James Quirke
Substitutes:
16
17
18
19
20
21
22
23
24
25
26
27
28
29
30
Manager:

== Top Scorer (up to round 3) ==
#	Name	Team	Scores	Games	Average
1	Maurice Shanahan	Lismore	2–27 (33)	3	11
2	Brendan Hannon	Ballyduff Upper	0–30 (30)	3	10
3	Richard Fenton	Fourmilewater	0–25 (25)	3	8.33
4	James Quirke	De La Salle	1–21 (24)	3	8
5	Seamus Prendergast	Ardmore	1–20 (23)	3	7.67
6	John Mullane	De La Salle	3–13 (22)	3	7.33
7	Mark Gorman	Abbeyside	1–16 (19)	3	6.33
8	Dave Bennett	Lismore	1–12 (15)	3	5
9	Eoin Kelly	Passage	2–8 (14)	2	7
10	Paul O'Brien	Tallow	2–7 (13)	3	4.33

== Championship statistics ==
=== Miscellaneous ===
- De La Salle win their first ever senior title.
- Abbeyside qualify for the final for the first time since 1969.
