= Brian O'Halloran (hurler) =

Irish hurler & Gaelic footballer (born 1991)

Personal information
- Native name: Brian Ó hAlluráin (Irish)
- Born: 17 May 1991 (age 35) Waterford, Ireland
- Occupation: Primary school teacher
- Height: 5 ft 10 in (178 cm)

Sport
- Sport: Hurling
- Position: Right corner-forward
Club
- Years: Club
- Clashmore–Kinsalebeg
Club titles
- Waterford titles: 0
College
- Years: College
- 2010-2014: Mary Immaculate College
College titles
- Fitzgibbon titles: 0
Inter-county*
Years	County	Apps (scores)
2010-2019	Waterford	17 (0-09)
Inter-county titles
- Munster titles: 1
- All-Irelands: 0
- NHL: 1
- All Stars: 0
- *Inter County team apps and scores correct as of 11:29, 12 June 2019.

Brian Thomas O'Halloran (born 17 May 1991) is an Irish hurler and Gaelic footballer who plays for Waterford Championship club Clashmore–Kinsalebeg. He played for the Waterford senior hurling team for 10 seasons, during which time he usually lined out as a right corner-forward.

O'Halloran began his career at club level with Clashmore–Kinsalebeg. He had already broken onto the club's top adult team when he captained Clashmore to the Waterford Minor Championship title in 2009. O'Halloran enjoyed his greatest success the following year when the club won the Waterford Intermediate Championship and promotion to the top flight of Waterford football. He also lined out with Mary Immaculate College in the Fitzgibbon Cup.

At inter-county level, O'Halloran was part of the successful Waterford minor team that won the Munster Championship in 2009 before later lining out with the under-21 team in 2012. He joined the Waterford senior team in 2010. A series of hamstring and ankle ligament injuries stunted his progression, however, he made a combined total of 47 National League and Championship appearances in a career that ended with his last game in 2019. During that time O'Halloran was part of Waterford's Munster Championship-winning team in 2010. He also secured a National Hurling League medal in 2015 and was an All-Ireland Championship runner-up in 2017. O'Halloran announced his retirement from inter-county hurling on 10 June 2019.

== Playing career ==
=== Mary Immaculate College ===
On 2 March 2013, O'Halloran was at right wing-forward when Mary Immaculate College qualified for their first ever Fitzgibbon Cup final. University College Cork ended the game as champions following a 2–17 to 2–12 victory.

=== Clashmore–Kinsalebeg ===
O'Halloran joined the Clashmore–Kinsalebeg club at a young age and played in all grades at juvenile and underage levels. On 20 May 2009, he captained the team and scored 1-04 from centre-forward when Clashmore defeated Ballinacourty by 1–07 to 1–06 to win the Waterford Minor Football Championship.

On 31 October 2010, O'Halloran lined out in the forwards when the Clashmore intermediate football team faced John Mitchels in the final of the Waterford Intermediate Championship. He ended the game with a winners' medal following a 1–13 to 1–07 victory.

On 30 September 2018, O'Halloran captained Clashmore when they qualified for the Western Intermediate Hurling Championship final. A 4–15 to 3–15 defeat of Ballysaggart secured a first ever title for the club.

=== Waterford ===
==== Minor and under-21 ====
O'Halloran first lined out for Waterford as a member of the minor team during the 2008 Munster Championship. He made his first appearance on 25 June when he scored 0-02 from left wing-forward in a 4–13 to 1–06 defeat by Cork.

O'Halloran was also eligible for the minor grade in 2009. He was at centre-forward when Waterford qualified for a Munster final-meeting with Tipperary on 12 July. O'Halloran scored a point from play and collected a Munster Championship medal following the 0–18 to 1–13 victory.

On 19 July 2012, O'Halloran made his only appearance for the Waterford under-21 team. He scored a point from right wing-forward in a 2–22 to 0–09 defeat by Clare in the Munster Championship.

==== Senior ====
O'Halloran joined the Waterford senior team for the 2010 Munster Championship having just completed his Leaving Certificate. On 11 July, he was an unused substitute when Waterford drew 2-15 apiece with Cork in the Munster final. O'Halloran also started the replay on the bench but was introduced as a 49th-minute substitute for Séamus Prendergast. He scored a point from play and collected a Munster Championship medal following the 1–16 to 1–13 victory.

On 5 February 2011, O'Halloran lined out at centre-forward when Waterford defeated Cork by 0–21 to 0–16 to win the pre-season Waterford Crystal Cup. In March 2011, he tore his hamstring tendon and was ruled out for the rest of the season. After returning to the panel in 2012, O'Halloran tore ligaments in his ankle and missed the entire season for a second successive year. O'Halloran said: "I suppose I would have had the name of being injury prone but it was actually only two major injuries and they took it out of the body. It was hard to get back on the wagon after them."

On 3 May 2015, O'Halloran was named at right corner-forward but started the game on the bench when Waterford faced Cork in the National League final. He scored a point from play after being introduced as a 58th-minute substitute for Colin Dunford and collected a winners' medal following the 1–24 to 0–17 victory. On 12 July 2015, O'Halloran was an unused substitute when Waterford were beaten for the fourth time in six seasons by Tipperary in the 2015 Munster final.

On 1 May 2016, O'Halloran was introduced as a 63rd-minute substitute for Austin Gleeson when Waterford drew 0-22 apiece with Clare in the National League final. He also started the replay on the bench but once again scored a point after being introduced as a substitute in the replay, which Waterford lost by 1–23 to 2–19. On 10 July, O'Halloran came on as a substitute for Pauric Mahony in the 60th minute of the Munster final, with Waterford eventually losing by 5–19 to 0–13.

On 3 September 2017, O'Halloran was named on the bench when Waterford faced Galway in the All-Ireland final. He came on as a 48th-minute substitute for Jake Dillon at left wing-forward and scored a point from play in the 0–26 to 2–17 defeat.

O'Halloran played his last game for Waterford on 8 June 2019 in a 2–30 to 2–17 defeat by Cork in the Munster Championship. He announced his retirement from inter-county hurling two days later.

== Career statistics ==
Team	Year	National League			Munster		All-Ireland		Total	
Team	Year	Division	Apps	Score	Apps	Score	Apps	Score	Apps	Score
Waterford	2010	Division 1	0	0-00	1	0-01	1	0-00	2	0-01
Waterford	2011	Division 1	0	0-00	0	0-00	0	0-00	0	0-00
Waterford	2012	Division 1A	0	0-00	0	0-00	0	0-00	0	0-00
Waterford	2013	Division 1A	5	0-10	1	0-00	0	0-00	6	0-10
Waterford	2014	Division 1A	0	0-00	0	0-00	0	0-00	0	0-00
Waterford	2015	Division 1B	8	0-07	1	0-00	0	0-00	9	0-07
Waterford	2016	Division 1A	7	0-06	2	0-00	2	0-02	11	0-08
Waterford	2017	Division 1A	6	0-04	1	0-01	4	0-04	11	0-09
Waterford	2018	Division 1A	3	0-01	1	0-00	—		4	0-01
Waterford	2019	Division 1B	1	0-00	3	0-01	—		4	0-01
Total			30	0-28	10	0-03	7	0-06	47	0-37

== Honours ==
Clashmore–Kinsalebeg

- Waterford Intermediate Football Championship (1): 2010
- Waterford Minor Football Championship (1): 2009 (c)

Waterford

- Munster Senior Hurling Championship (1): 2010
- National Hurling League (1): 2015
- Waterford Crystal Cup (1): 2011
- Munster Minor Hurling Championship (1): 2009
