= Austin Flynn =

Irish hurler (1933–2021)

Personal information
- Native name: Áistín Ó Floinn (Irish)
- Born: 1933 Abbeyside, County Waterford, Ireland
- Died: 26 April 2021 (aged 87–88) Dungarvan, County Waterford, Ireland
- Occupation: Health Board employee
- Height: 5 ft 11 in (180 cm)

Sport
- Sport: Hurling
- Position: Full-back
Club
- Years: Club
- Abbeyside
Club titles
	Football	Hurling
Waterford titles	0	0
Inter-county
- Years: County
- 1952–1967: Waterford
Inter-county titles
- Munster titles: 3
- All-Irelands: 1
- NHL: 1

Augustine P. Flynn (1933 – 26 April 2021), known as Austin Flynn, was an Irish hurler. As a player, he was noted in newspaper reports as a "fine hard-tackling but honest player" and "a sturdy sentry on the edge of the square." Flynn had a fifteen-year association with the Waterford senior hurling team and has been described as "one of its greatest defenders."

== Career ==
In the late 1950s and early 1960s, the Waterford senior hurling team rose from obscurity to enjoy a golden age in the sport. Flynn, having earlier lined out at minor level but declined a position on the junior team because of his youth, first played for the team in 1952 but only established himself as first-choice full-back five years later. It was a position he retained for over a decade. After winning the first of three Munster Championship medals in 1957, Flynn went on to claim his sole All-Ireland Championship title after a replay defeat of Kilkenny in 1959. He also won a National League medal in 1963. At club level, Flynn enjoyed a lengthy career playing for Abbeyside in both hurling and Gaelic football. With Munster he won two Railway Cup medals.

Flynn had a number of personal achievements including three Cú Chulainn awards. He was recognised as his county's greatest full-back when he was picked in that position on the Waterford Hurling Team of the Millennium.

== Death ==
Flynn's death was announced on 27 April 2021.
