= 2016 Waterford Senior Football Championship =

Waterford S.F.C.
- Season: 2016
- Champions: The Nire (8th S.F.C. Title)
- Relegated: St. Saviour's

The 2016 Waterford Senior Football Championship was the 129th edition of the Waterford GAA's premier club Gaelic football tournament for senior graded clubs in County Waterford, Ireland. The tournament consists of 12 teams, with the winner going on to represent Waterford in the Munster Senior Club Football Championship. The championship starts with a seeded group stage and then progresses to a knock out stage.

Stradbally were the defending champions after they defeated Abbeyside/Ballinacourty in the 2015 final, however, they relinquished their crown when Ballincourty defeated them at the semi-final stage.

This was Ballinameela's return to the senior grade.

On 6 November 2016, The Nire claimed their 8th S.F.C. title when defeating Ballinacourty 1-17 to 0-8 in the final in Fraher Field.

St. Saviour's were relegated to the 2017 I.F.C. after losing the Relegation Final and a remarkable 29 season stay in the top flight came to an end. During this period they claimed one S.F.C. title when defeating Kilrossanty in 1998 and were runners-up in 1988 when losing to the same opposition.

== Team changes ==
The following teams have changed division since the 2015 championship season.

=== To S.F.C. ===
Promoted from I.F.C.

- Ballinameela – (Intermediate Champions)

=== From S.F.C. ===
Relegated to I.F.C.

- De La Salle

== Group stage ==
All 12 teams enter the competition at this stage. The top 4 teams in both groups compete in four quarter-finals. The bottom team in each group contest the relegation play-off.

=== Group 1 ===
Team	Pld	W	L	D	PF	PA	PD	Pts
Stradbally	5	5	0	0	51	38	+13	10
Kilrossanty	5	4	1	0	89	51	+38	8
Clashmore	5	3	2	0	66	50	+16	6
Rathgormack	5	2	3	0	50	54	-4	4
Ballinameela	5	1	4	0	42	91	-49	2
Brickey Rangers	5	1	4	0	42	56	-14	0

Round 1

- Rathgormack 1-7, 0-8 Brickey Rangers, 9/4/2016,
- Stradbally 1-10, 1-5 Ballinameela, 9/4/2016,
- Kilrossanty 2-8, 1-8 Clashmore, 21/8/2016,

Round 2

- Kilrossanty 2-11, 1-7 Brickey Rangers, 16/4/2016,
- Stradbally 0-8, 0-4 Rathgormack, 19/4/2016,
- Clashmore 1-12, 0-7 Ballinameela, 19/4/2016,

Round 3

- Rathgormack 1-17, 0-7 Ballinameela, 25/6/2016,
- Clashmore 1-10, 0-9 Brickey Rangers, 3/9/2016
- Stradbally 1-13, 2-9 Kilrossanty, 4/9/2016,

Round 4

- Kilrossanty 1-12, 0-10 Rathgormack, 15/7/2016,
- Ballinameela 3-7, 0-15 Brickey Rangers, 29/7/2016,
- Stradbally 1-11, 0-11 Clashmore, 11/9/2016,

Round 5

- Clashmore 0-16, 1-3 Rathgormack, 14/10/2016,
- Kilrossanty 4-16, 0-4 Ballinameela 14/10/2016,
- Stradbally w/o, scr Brickey Rangers, 17/10/2016,

=== Group 2 ===
Team	Pld	W	L	D	PF	PA	PD	Pts
The Nire	5	4	1	0	97	60	+37	8
Ballinacourty	5	3	1	1	104	54	+50	7
An Rinn	5	3	1	1	85	59	+26	7
Ardmore	5	2	3	0	61	89	-28	4
Gaultier	5	1	4	0	54	123	-69	2
St. Saviour's	5	1	4	0	57	83	-26	2

Round 1

- Ballinacourty 1-10, 1-10 An Rinn, 15/4/2016,
- Ardmore 5-5, 2-12 St. Saviour's, 16/4/2016,
- The Nire 4-16, 1-7 Gaultier, 19/4/2016,

Round 2

- An Rinn 4-9, 1-9 Gaultier, 23/4/2016,
- St. Saviour's 3-7, 1-11 Ballinacourty, 23/4/2016,
- The Nire 2-18, 0-9 Ardmore, 22/8/2016,

Round 3

- Ardmore 2-12, 0-13 Gaultier, 23/6/2016,
- An Rinn 2-15, 0-9 St. Saviour's, 23/6/2016,
- Ballinacourty 2-13, 0-11 The Nire, 9/9/2016,

Round 4

- Gaultier 0-13, 0-6 St. Saviour's, 16/7/2016,
- Ballinacourty 1-15, 0-8 Ardmore, 30/7/2016,
- The Nire 2-13, 0-14 An Rinn, 3/9/2016,

Round 5

- The Nire 0-15, 1-5 St. Saviour's, 14/10/2016,
- An Rinn 2-10, 0-6 Ardmore, 14/10/2016,
- Ballinacourty 8-16, 0-6 Gaultier, 17/10/2016,

== Knock-out stage ==
=== Last eight ===
Quarter-Finals		Semi-Finals		Final
Stradbally	0-12
Ardmore	1-7	Stradbally	0-10
Ballinacourty	0-15	Ballinacourty	1-10
Clashmore	1-7			Ballinacourty	0-8
Kilrossanty	2-10			The Nire	1-17
An Rinn	2-9	Kilrossanty	1-4
The Nire	0-13	The Nire	1-10
Rathgormack	0-9

=== Quarter-finals ===
21 October 2017; 7 pm	The Nire	0-12 – 0-9	Rathgormack	Fraher Field, Dungarvan; Referee: John Condon (An Rinn)

21 October 2017; 8:30 pm	Stradbally	0-12 – 1-7	Ardmore	Fraher Field; Referee: Anthony Fitzgerald (Gaultier)

23 October 2017; 6 pm	Kilrossanty	2-10 – 2-9	An Rinn	Fraher Field; Referee: Tom Dee (John Mitchels)

22 October 2017; 7:30 pm	Ballinacourty	0-15 – 1-7	Clashmore	Fraher Field; Referee: Tommy Sullivan (Affane)

=== Semi-finals ===
29 October 2017	The Nire	1-10 – 1-4	Kilrossanty	Fraher Field; Referee: Anthony Fitzgerald (Gaultier); Man of the Match: Martin Walsh

30 October 2017	Ballinacourty	1-10 – 0-10	Stradbally	Fraher Field; Referee: Tommy Sullivan (Affane); Man of the Match: Gary Hurney

=== Final ===
6 November 2016; 2:45 pm Final	The Nire	1-17 – 0-8	Ballinacourty	Fraher Field; Referee: Alan Kissane; Man of the Match: Liam Lawlor
6 November 2016; 2:45 pm Final	Conor Gleeson and Liam Lawlor 0-5 each, Darren Guiry 1-1, Brian Wall 0-4f, Seamus Lawlor and Kenny Brazil 0-1 each	Report	Patrick Hurney 0-7 (0-3f), Mark Ferncombe 0-1	Fraher Field; Referee: Alan Kissane; Man of the Match: Liam Lawlor

== Relegation play-off ==
Brickey Rangers 0-10 0-8 St. Saviour's, Leamybrien, 5/11/2016
