= Dom Enright =

Irish hurler

Personal information
- Native name: Dominic Mac Ionnrachtaigh (Irish)
- Nickname: Dom
- Born: 1935 Abbeyside, County Waterford, Irish Free State
- Died: 7 October 2008 (aged 73) Waterford, Ireland
- Occupations: Fitter and farmer

Sport
- Sport: Hurling
Club
- Years: Club
- Abbeyside–Ballinacourty
Club titles
	Football	Hurling
Waterford titles	0	0
Inter-county*
Years	County	Apps (scores)
1957–1959	Waterford	0 (0-00)
Inter-county titles
- Munster titles: 0
- All-Irelands: 0
- NHL: 0
- *Inter County team apps and scores correct as of 16:42, 22 March 2015.

Dominic Enright (1935 – 7 October 2008) was an Irish hurler who played for the Waterford senior team.

Born in Abbeyside, County Waterford, Enright first arrived on the inter-county scene at the age of twenty-two when he first linked up with the senior team. He joined the senior panel during the 1957 championship. Enright was a regular member of the panel over the next few years and won one Munster medal as a non-playing substitute. At club level Enright played hurling withy Abbeyside and Gaelic football with Abbeyside/Ballinacourty. Enright retired from inter-county hurling during the 1959 championship.

== Honours ==
=== Team ===
Waterford

- Munster Senior Hurling Championship (1): 1957 (sub)
