= Tony Mansfield (hurler) =

Irish hurler and manager

Personal information
- Native name: Antaine Móinbhíol (Irish)
- Born: 1939 Abbeyside, County Waterford, Ireland
- Died: 10 March 2013 (aged 73) Cork, Ireland
- Occupation: ATGWU official

Sport
- Sport: Hurling
Club
- Years: Club
- Abbeyside–Ballinacourty
Club titles
- Cork titles: 0
Inter-county
- Years: County
- Waterford
Inter-county titles
- Munster titles: 0
- All-Irelands: 0
- NHL: 0

Anthony Mansfield (1939 – 10 March 2013) was an Irish hurler and manager who played for the Waterford senior team.

Mansfield played for Waterford during the 1960s, however, he enjoyed little success during his inter-county career. During that time he won one Munster medal as a non-playing substitute. Mansfield was an All-Ireland runner-up on one occasion, also as a non-playing substitute.

At club level Mansfield played with Abbeyside–Ballinacourty.

In retirement from playing Mansfield became involved in coaching and team management. He spent several terms as manager of the Waterford under-21 and senior teams and enjoyed some success. Mansfield also served as a referee at club level.

Sporting positions
Preceded by	Waterford Senior Hurling Manager; 1986–1990	Succeeded by Joe McGrath
Preceded by Georgie Leahy	Waterford Senior Hurling Manager; 1994–1996	Succeeded by Gerald McCarthy
