= Greg Fives =

Irish Gaelic footballer and hurler

Personal information
- Native name: Gréagóir Ó Cuaig (Irish)
- Born: 1949 Abbeyside, County Waterford, Ireland
- Died: 15 October 2008 (aged 59) Dungarvan, County Waterford, Ireland
- Occupation: Dairy farmer

Sport
- Sport: Gaelic football
Inter-county management
- Years: Team
- 1999–2001: Waterford

Greg Fives (1949 – 15 October 2008) was an Irish Gaelic footballer and hurler.

Born in Abbeyside, County Waterford, Fives first played competitive Gaelic football and hurling in his youth. At club level he played with Abbeyside–Ballinacourty.

In retirement from playing Fives became involved in team management and coaching. At club level he served as a selector with Abbeyside and Ballinacourty, while at inter-county level he was manager of the Waterford senior football and intermediate hurling teams.

== Honours ==
=== Player ===
Abbeyside

- Waterford Under-21 Hurling Championship (1): 1966

Ballinacourty

- Waterford Under-21 Football Championship (1): 1970 (c)

Sporting positions
Preceded by John Cummins	Waterford Senior Football Manager; 1999–2001	Succeeded by Denis Walsh
