= Waterford Ladies' Senior Football Championship =

Annual ladies' gaelic football competition in Ireland

Waterford Senior Camogie Championship
- Code: Ladies' Gaelic Football
- Region: Waterford (GAA)
- Title holders: Gaultier (1st title)
- Most titles: Ballymacarbry (45 titles)
- Official website: waterfordladiesfootball.ie

The Waterford Ladies Football Championship is the senior Ladies' Gaelic Football competition featuring clubs affiliated to the Waterford GAA.

Ballymacarbry are the competitions most successful club, having won 45 titles.

Ballymacarbry won 42 consecutive titles from 1982 to 2023.

Comeragh Rangers are the current champions, having defeated Ballymacarbry in the 2024 and 2025 finals.

== Roll of honour ==
#	Club	Titles	Years won
1	Ballymacarbry	45	1971, 1973, 1975, 1982, 1983, 1984, 1985, 1986, 1987, 1988, 1989, 1990, 1991, 1992, 1993, 1994, 1995, 1996, 1997, 1998, 1999, 2000, 2001, 2002, 2003, 2004, 2005, 2006, 2007, 2008, 2009, 2010, 2011, 2012, 2013, 2014, 2015, 2016, 2017, 2018, 2019, 2020, 2021, 2022, 2023
2	Portlaw	4	1976, 1977, 1978, 1979
3	Dunhill	2	1980, 1981
3	Kilrossanty	2	1972, 1974
3	Comeragh Rangers	2	2024, 2025
4	Gaultier	1	2026

== Finals listed by year ==
Munster and All-Ireland winners
Munster winners and All-Ireland finalists
Munster winners

Year	Winner	Score	Runners up	Score
2026	Gaultier	1-08	Ballymacarbry	1-04
2025	Comeragh Rangers	4–11	Ballymacarbry	0-07
2024	Comeragh Rangers	5–3	Ballymacarbry	1–6
2023	Ballymacarbry	1–9	Comeragh Rangers	0–10
2022	Ballymacarbry	5–11	Comeragh Rangers	2–6
2021	Ballymacarbry	4–5	Comeragh Rangers	0–7
2020	Ballymacarbry	4–14	Stradbally	0–6
2019	Ballymacarbry	1–14	Comeragh Rangers	0–14
2018	Ballymacarbry	0–8	Comeragh Rangers	0–4
2017	Ballymacarbry	0–15	Comeragh Rangers	1–9
2016	Ballymacarbry			
2015	Ballymacarbry			
2014	Ballymacarbry			
2013	Ballymacarbry			
2012	Ballymacarbry			
2011	Ballymacarbry			
2010	Ballymacarbry			
2009	Ballymacarbry			
2008	Ballymacarbry			
2007	Ballymacarbry			
2006	Ballymacarbry			
2005	Ballymacarbry			
2004	Ballymacarbry			
2003	Ballymacarbry			
2002	Ballymacarbry			
2001	Ballymacarbry			
2000	Ballymacarbry			
1999	Ballymacarbry			
1998	Ballymacarbry			
1997	Ballymacarbry			
1996	Ballymacarbry			
1995	Ballymacarbry			
1994	Ballymacarbry			
1993	Ballymacarbry			
1992	Ballymacarbry			
1991	Ballymacarbry			
1990	Ballymacarbry			
1989	Ballymacarbry			
1988	Ballymacarbry			
1987	Ballymacarbry			
1986	Ballymacarbry			
1985	Ballymacarbry			
1984	Ballymacarbry			
1983	Ballymacarbry			
1982	Ballymacarbry			
1981	Dunhill	4–1	Ballymacarbry	0–1
1980	Dunhill			
1979	Portlaw	2–3	Dunhill	2–1
1978	Portlaw		Dunhill	
1977	Portlaw		Ballymacarbry	
1976	Portlaw	2-2	Ballymacarbry	1–3
1975	Ballymacarbry	2–6	Portlaw	1–6
1974	Kilrossanty		Stradbally	
1973	Ballymacarbry		Stradbally	
1972	Kilrossanty			
1971	Ballymacarbry		Kilrossanty	
