= Conor Gleeson =

Conor Gleeson may refer to:

- Conor Gleeson (Tipperary hurler) (born 1973), Irish hurler
- Conor Gleeson (Waterford hurler), Irish hurler

== See also ==
- Connor Gleeson, Gaelic footballer for Galway
