= Erin's Hope GAA =

Gaelic games club in County Waterford, Ireland

Erin's Hope
- Founded: 1895
- County: Waterford
- Nickname: The Hopes
- Colours: White and green

Erin's Hope GAA was a Gaelic Athletic Association (GAA) club located in Dungarvan, County Waterford in Ireland. The club was formed in 1895 when a split occurred in the Dungarvan team which resulted in the forming of two teams, one called Erins Hope, and the other called Shandon Rovers. The club won Waterford Senior Football Championship titles in 1896, 1897 and 1898, going on to represent Waterford in the 1898 All-Ireland Senior Football Championship final.

== Honours ==
- Waterford Senior Football Championship (3): 1896, 1897, 1898
