= St Brendan's GAA (Waterford) =

Gaelic games club in County Waterford, Ireland

St Brendan's
- Naomh Breandán
- County: Waterford
- Colours: Maroon and white

Playing kits
Standard colours

Senior Club Championships
	All Ireland	Munster champions	Waterford champions
Football:	0	0	0

St Brendan's GAA is a Gaelic Athletic Association group team based in east County Waterford, Ireland. The group team comprises the clubs, Kill, Bonmahon and Newtown.

As a group team, the team only competes in the Waterford Senior Football Championship. The group team has of yet not won the championship.
