= Darren Mulhearne =

Waterford Gaelic football goalkeeper

Darren Mulhearne (born 1973) is a Gaelic football goalkeeper who plays for Kilrossanty. He is noted for making his championship debut for Waterford against Clare in the 2019 Munster Senior Football Championship quarter-final at the age of 46, believed to be the oldest player to debut. Two of his opponents in that game, and fellow debutants, had a combined age that was less than that of Mulhearne. He kept a clean sheet, in a one-point loss. Mulhearne was called into the team after Aaron Beresford sustained an injury. Mulhearne had first been part of the Waterford senior team as a 17-year-old schoolboy, but never played. He is married, with a son and two daughters.
