= Shandon Rovers GAA =

Gaelic games club in County Waterford, Ireland

Shandon Rovers
- Founded: 1895
- County: Waterford
- Nickname: Rovers
- Colours: Green with Gold Stripe

Shandon Rovers were a Gaelic Athletic Association club located in Dungarvan, County Waterford. They formed in 1895. The early years were focused on organizing sport meetings that were led by the famous Dan Fraher who later bought the land in the Shandon area of the town. This venue is now known as Fraher Field. Some of the known early success of the club was earning the senior double in 1908 and in 1926, until the latter marking the first of five senior football title wins in a row. Completing a four in a row in senior football between 1935 and 1948, and a three in a row from 1990 to 1992. Also winning seven times the senior hurling championship, having the last one in 1941 while reaching the final 2012. During the 1983 and 1984, they won the minor double and likewise in 2005, 2006, and 2007 they won the under 12 double. The club was able to capture the county Feile titles in both hurling and football in 2008 and went on to win the Division 5 All Ireland Feile Football title in Cavan.
