= Eoin Dunphy =

Irish hurler

Personal information
- Born: 1972 (age 53–54) Waterford City

Sport
- Sport: Hurling
- Position: Full-back
Club
- Years: Club
- 1980's -: De La Salle
Inter-county
- Years: County
- 1990's: Waterford
Inter-county titles
- Munster titles: 0
- All-Irelands: 0
- All Stars: 0

Eoin Dunphy (born 1972) is an Irish hurler who formerly played with De La Salle GAA at club level and with Waterford GAA at inter-county level. Dunphy won the All-Ireland Under 21 Hurling Championship with Waterford in 1992.

== Honours ==
- All-Ireland Under 21 Hurling Championship winner - 1992
- Munster Under-21 Hurling Championship winner - 1992

== Honours as Manager ==
- Waterford Senior Hurling Championship winner - 2008
- Munster Senior Club Hurling Championship winner - 2008
