= 2020 Waterford Senior Football Championship =

Waterford S.F.C.
- Season: 2020
- Champions: Ballinacourty (7th S.F.C. Title)
- Relegated: None

The 2020 Waterford Senior Football Championship is the 133rd edition of the Waterford GAA's premier club Gaelic football tournament for senior graded clubs in County Waterford, Ireland. The tournament consists of 12 teams, with the winner going on to represent Waterford in the Munster Senior Club Football Championship. The championship starts with a stage and then progresses to a knock out stage. Due to the emergence of and the impact of the COVID-19 pandemic on Gaelic games, it was decided that there would be no relegation from the S.F.C. this season.

Rathgormack were the defending champions after they defeated Ballinacourty in the previous years final. However the defence of their title came undone at the penultimate stage when losing to Ballinacourty.

This was St. Saviours' return to the senior grade after claiming the 2019 Waterford I.F.C. with a final victory over Mondeligo. This was their first year back in the top-flight of Waterford club football in 3 years since relegation at the end of the 2016 season.

On 21 August 2021, Ballinacourty claimed their 7th Waterford S.F.C. crown when defeating Rathgormack in the final at Walsh Park.

== Team changes ==
The following teams have changed division since the 2019 championship season.

=== To S.F.C. ===
Promoted from 2019 Waterford I.F.C.

- St. Saviour's - (Intermediate Champions)

=== From S.F.C. ===
Relegated to 2020 Waterford I.F.C.

- Portlaw

== Group stage ==
There are 4 groups called Group A, B, C and D. The top finisher in each group will qualify for the semi-finals. Each group was seeded to consist of one Semi-Finalist from 2019, one defeated Quarter-Finalist from 2019, and finally a team who failed to reach the quarter-finals in 2019.

=== Group A ===
Team	Pld	W	L	D	PF	PA	PD	Pts
Ballinacourty	0	0	0	0	0	0	+0	0
Clashmore/Kinsalebeg	0	0	0	0	0	0	+0	0
St. Declan's Ardmore	0	0	0	0	0	0	+0	0

Round 1:

- Ballinacourty -vs- Ardmore, 5/9/2020,

Round 2:

- Clashmore -vs- Ardmore, 9/9/2020,

Round 3:

- Ballinacourty -vs- Clashmore, 13/9/2020,

=== Group B ===
Team	Pld	W	L	D	PF	PA	PD	Pts
The Nire	0	0	0	0	0	0	+0	0
Kilmacthomas	0	0	0	0	0	0	+0	0
Gaultier	0	0	0	0	0	0	+0	0

Round 1:

- The Nire -vs- Kilmacthomas, 4/9/2020,

Round 2:

- Kilmacthomas -vs- Gaultier, 8/9/2020,

Round 3:

- The Nire -vs- Gaultier, 13/9/2020,

=== Group C ===
Team	Pld	W	L	D	PF	PA	PD	Pts
Rathgormack	0	0	0	0	0	0	+0	0
Kilrossanty	0	0	0	0	0	0	+0	0
St. Saviour's	0	0	0	0	0	0	+0	0

Round 1:

- Rathgormack -vs- St. Saviour's, 5/9/2020,

Round 2:

- Kilrossanty -vs- St. Saviour's, 9/9/2020,

Round 3:

- Rathgormack -vs- Kilrossanty, 13/9/2020,

=== Group D ===
Team	Pld	W	L	D	PF	PA	PD	Pts
Stradbally	0	0	0	0	0	0	+0	0
An Rinn	0	0	0	0	0	0	+0	0
Brickey Rangers	0	0	0	0	0	0	+0	0

Round 1:

- Stradbally -vs- Brickey Rangers, 5/9/2020,

Round 2:

- An Rinn -vs- Brickey Rangers, 9/9/2020,

Round 3:

- Stradbally -vs- An Rinn, 13/9/2020,

== Semi-finals ==
?? September 2020; Semi-Final	???	-vs-	???	???

?? September 2020; Semi-Final	???	-vs-	???	???

== Final ==
?? September 2020; Final	Ballinacourty	0-13 vs 0-10	Rathgormack	???
