= Lemybrien =

Lemybrien Irish: Léim Uí Bhriain
- Village
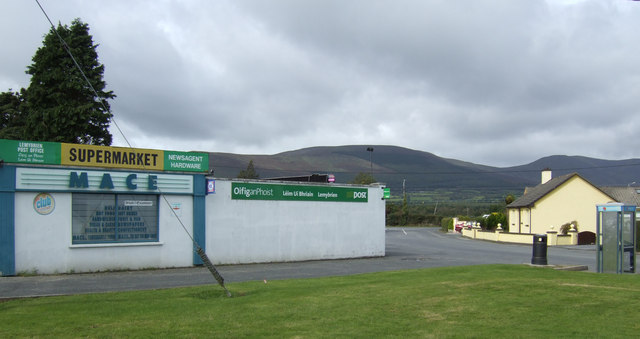
- Shop and post office in Lemybrien

- Location in Ireland
- Coordinates: 52°10′06″N 7°31′16″W
- Country: Ireland
- Province: Munster
- County: County Waterford

Population (2016)
  - Total: 192
- Time zone: UTC+0 (WET)
  - Summer (DST): UTC-1 (IST (WEST))

Lemybrien (Irish: Léim Uí Bhriain, meaning 'O'Brien's leap') is a small village and townland in County Waterford, Ireland. It is on the N25 Cork to Waterford City road. Lemybrien is in the foothills of the Comeragh Mountains, in an area of County Waterford known as "The Déise". As of the 2016 census, the village had a population of 192 people, of whom 104 were male and 88 female.

== Sport ==
Stage 2 of the 1998 Tour de France passed through the area. Kilrossanty GAA sports club is based in Lemybrien.

== Archeology ==
Drumlohan Souterrain and Ogham Stones, a national monument dating to the 5th–9th centuries AD, lies 4 km (2½ mi) to the east.
