= 1898 All-Ireland Senior Football Championship final =

Final of Gaelic football competition

- Event: 1898 All-Ireland Senior Football Championship
Dublin	Waterford
2–8 (14)	0–4 (4)
- Date: 8 April 1900
- City: Tipperary
- Referee: John McCarthy (Kilkenny)
- Attendance: 1,000
- Weather: wind and rain

The 1898 All-Ireland Senior Football Championship final was the eleventh All-Ireland Final and the deciding match of the 1898 All-Ireland Senior Football Championship, an inter-county Gaelic football tournament for the top teams in Ireland.

== Match ==
=== Summary ===
Dublin, who led 1–6 to 0–3 at the interval, were the winners, with Joe Ledwidge scoring both goals. The captain of the winning team was Matt Rea.

At this time, club teams represented their counties with the Geraldines club representing Dublin and Waterford represented by the Erin's Hope club of Dungarvan.

It was the fifth of six All-Ireland SFC titles won by Dublin in the 1890s.

=== Details ===
==== Dublin ====
- Matt Rea (c)
- J. J. Keane
- J. Fahy
- Tom Hoey Redmond
- Bill Sherry
- Jack Heslin
- Dan O'Callaghan
- P. Levey
- C. Sargent
- P. Redmond
- Peter McCann
- T. Norton
- Tommy Errity
- P. Fitzsimons
- P. Smith
- J. Ryan
- Joe Ledwidge
