= John Mitchels GAA (Waterford) =

Gaelic games club in County Waterford, Ireland

- Seán Mistéil CLG
- Founded: 1962
- County: Waterford
- Nickname: The johnners
- Colours: Red and green
- Grounds: Kilnagrange, Kilmacthomas
- Coordinates: 52°13′14.70″N 7°26′27.08″W

Playing kits
Standard colours

Senior Club Championships
	All Ireland	Munster champions	Waterford champions
Football:	-	-	3

John Mitchels GAA is a Gaelic Athletic Association club based in Fews, County Waterford, Ireland. The club is exclusively dedicated to Gaelic Football Junior level.

The club has won the Waterford Senior Football Championship 3 times, 1970, 1973 and 1976.

== Honours ==
- Waterford Senior Football Championship: 3
  - 1970, 1973, 1976
- Waterford Intermediate Football Championships: 2
  - 2003, 2007
- Waterford Under-21 Football Championships: 1
  - 1969
- Waterford Minor Football Championships 2
  - 1974, 1975
