= Waterford Minor Football Championship =

Annual Gaelic football competition

The Waterford Minor Football Championship is a Gaelic football competition played by GAA teams in County Waterford, Ireland. All players have to be under the age of 18 in the year in which they take part here. The competition is organized by the two divisions of Waterford GAA county board - East Division and West Division. The clubs will first play in the divisional competition with the winners of each playing in the county final.

== Roll of honour ==
Year	Winner	Score	Opponent	Score
2020	Gaultier		Rathgormack	
2019	Gaultier		Ballinacourty	
2018	Ballinacourty	1-10	Rathgormack	0-07
2017	Rathgormack	3-08	Ballinacourty	3-06
2016	Gaultier	2-03	Ballinacourty	0-08
2015	Ballinacourty	2-06	Gaultier	1-04
2014	The Nire	3-11	Stradbally	0-06
2013	Dungarvan	6-11	The Nire	0-09
2012	Rathgormack	2-14	Dungarvan	2-08
2011	An Gaeltacht		Clashmore	
2010	De La Salle	1-11	Ballinacourty	0-11
2009	Clashmore	1-07	Ballinacourty	1-06
2008	The Nire	2-09	Roanmore	0-12
2007	The Nire	1-11	De La Salle	2-05
2006	Stradbally	2-09	Gaultier	2-05
2005	Ballinacourty	2-10	De La Salle	2-03
2004	Kilrossanty	1-04	De La Salle	1-03
2003	Ballinacourty	2-08	De La Salle	2-03
2002	Ballinacourty	0-11	Gaultier	1-06
2001	Ballinacourty	2-06	Rathgormack	1-07
2000	St. Oliver's, Ballinameela	0-13	Mount Sion	1-06
1999	Ballyduff/ Butlerstown	2-06 (replay)	Ardmore	1-08
1998	Ardmore	1-12	Gaultier	0-04
1997	Ardmore	2-08	Rathgormack	0-10
1996	Gaultier	1-08	Ardmore	1-07
1995	Ballinacourty	0-10	Gaultier	1-03
1994	Ballinacourty	2-11	Tramore	1-05
1993	Tramore	2-08	Ballinacourty	1-09
1992	Dungarvan	2-06	Tramore	1-08
1991	Dungarvan	1-09	Tramore	0-05
1990	Gaultier	0-10	Dungarvan	1-05
1989	Gaultier	1-10	Kilrossanty	2-06
1988	Gaultier	3-10	Kilrossanty	1-01
1987	St. Saviours	1-08	Kilrossanty	0-04
1986	St. Saviours	2-16	Drum Rovers	0-04
1985	De La Salle	4-08	Stradbally	2-04
1984	Dungarvan	1-11	Clan Na Gael	0-08
1983	Dungarvan	1-09	Clan Na Gael	0-03
1982	Ballinacourty	3-04	Kilmacthomas	1-07
1981	Ballinacourty	1-06	Tramore	1-01
1980	Ballinacourty	3-04	Roanmore	2-02
1979	De La Salle	1-12	Ballinacourty	0-10
1978	Affane	1-08	Mount Sion	2-04
1977	Roanmore	3-02 (Replay)	Affane	1-00
1976	Ballinacourty	4-09	Cuchulainns	0-05
1975	John Mitchels	4-03	Ballinacourty	2-08
1974	John Mitchels	2-04	The Nire	1-06
1973	Mount Sion	3-05	Tallow	2-04
1972	Tramore	6-06	Tallow	1-01
1971	Tallow	3-08	Tramore	1-03
1970	Ballinacourty	3-05	Clan Na Gael	1-05
1969	Tallow	2-08	Clanna Gael	1-03
1968	Tallow	1-06	Clan Na Gael	0-02
1967	Tallow	1-10	Ferrybank	1-03
1966	Ardmore	3-10	Kevin Barry's	0-02
1965	Mount Sion (Na Risigh)	2-06	Ardmore	1-02
1964	Stradbally	2-07	Mount Sion	2-04
1963	Tramore	4-08	Ballinacourty	1-01
1962	Tramore	3-05	Ardmore	1-02
1961	Dungarvan	0-06	De La Salle	1-02
1960	Tramore	7-06	Dungarvan	0-00
1959	Ballinacourty	0-01	Tramore	Nil
1958	Mount Sion (Na Risigh)	0-05	Rinn O gCuanach	1-00
1957	Mount Sion (Na Risigh)	2-04	Rinn O gCuanach	1-02
1956	Mount Sion	2-06	Rinn O gCuanach	1-06
1955	Rinn O gCuanach	1-05	Kill	0-03
1954	Rinn O gCuanach	2-07	Mount Sion	1-05
1953	De La Salle	3-05	Ballinacourty	1-01
1952	Abbeyside	3-01	Mount Sion (Na Risigh)	2-02
1951	St. Augustine Rovers	1-05	Dunhill (O Brien's) 1-00	
1950	St. Augustine Rovers	2-04	Dunhill	1-03
1949	St. Augustine's College	2-02	Emmetts (Waterford City)	1-02
1948	Na Saisealaigh's (Dungarvan CBS)	5-02	Mount Sion (Na Risigh)	0-02
1947	Cappoquin (Ceapach Chuinn)	0-03	Mount Sion (Na Risigh)	0-01
1946	Na Saisealaigh's (Dungarvan CBS)	0-01	De La Salle	0-00
1945	Cathal Brugha's			
1944	Dunhill (O Brien's)	1-04	Dungarvan	2-00
1943	De La Salle (St Stephen's)	2-02	Dungarvan	0-00
1942	De La Salle (St Stephen's)	2-02	Dungarvan	0-00
1941	De La Salle(St Stephen's)	7-06	Cathal Brugha's	0-01
1940	Butlerstown	2-04	St. Carthage's	1-00
1939	De La Salle (St Stephen's)	2-03	Stradbally	0-01
1938	De La Salle (St Stephen's)		Dungarvan	
1937	Stradbally	2-07	Mountain Rovers	1-01
1936	Kill/Newtown		Dungarvan	
1935	Mountain Rovers		Stradbally	
1934	Blackwater Rovers		Ballyduff Lower	
1933	Dungarvan			
1932	Dungarvan			
1931	De La Salle		Clashmore	
1930	De La Salle			
1929	De La Salle			
1928	Dungarvan			
1927	Villerstown			
