= Conor Gleeson (Waterford hurler) =

Irish hurler

Personal information
- Native name: Conchúr Ó Gliasáin (Irish)
- Born: 10 October 1996 (age 30) Waterford, Ireland
- Occupation: Student
- Height: 5 ft 10 in (178 cm)

Sport
- Sport: Hurling
- Position: Midfield
Club
- Years: Club
- 2012-present: The Nire–Fourmilewater
Club titles
- Waterford titles: 0
Inter-county
- Years: County
- 2015-present: Waterford
Inter-county titles
- Munster titles: 0
- All-Irelands: 0
- NHL: 0
- All Stars: 0

Conor Gleeson (born 10 October 1996) is an Irish hurler who plays in midfield for the Waterford senior team and plays his club hurling and football with The Nire–Fourmilewater.

On 13 August 2017, Gleeson was sent off in the All-Ireland semi-final against Cork and missed the 2017 All-Ireland Final after he was handed a one-match ban.
