= Gary Hurney =

Irish hurler and Gaelic footballer

Personal information
- Native name: Garraí Ó hUrnaí (Irish)
- Nickname: Tank
- Born: 1980 (age 45–46) Moycullen, County Galway, Ireland
- Height: 6 ft 4 in (193 cm)

Sport
- Football Position: Midfield
- Hurling Position: Centre-forward
Club
- Years: Club
- Abbeyside–Ballinacourty
Club titles
| | Football | Hurling |
| Waterford titles | 3 | 0 |
Inter-county*
| Years | County | Apps (scores) |
| 1999–2013 2008–2010 | Waterford (football); Waterford (hurling) | 20 (6–32); 6 (1–1) |
Inter-county titles
| | Football | Hurling |
| Munster Titles | 0 | 0 |
| All-Ireland Titles | 0 | 0 |
| League titles | 0 | 0 |
| All-Stars | 0 | 0 |
- *Inter County team apps and scores correct as of 15:39, 19 January 2013.

Gary Hurney (born 1980) is an Irish dual player of hurling and Gaelic football who formerly played for the Waterford senior team in both codes.

Hurney made his first appearance for the Waterford football team during the 1999 championship against cork and immediately became a regular member of the starting fifteen. He also spent three seasons with the Waterford senior hurling team. During his inter-county career Hurney has enjoyed little success. He was an All-Ireland runner-up in hurling on one occasion. He announced his retirement from inter-county football in December 2013, citing injuries and family commitments.

Hurney plays his club hurling and football with Abbeyside–Ballinacourty. He has won three county football championship medals with his beloved Abbeyside–Ballinacourty.

== Awards ==
- 2007 Waterford Senior footballer of the year
- 1998 Waterford Minor footballer of the year
- 2006 Munster Senior Football All Star
- 2008 Waterford senior footballer of the year
- 2013 Waterford Senior Footballer of the year
