= St Saviour's GAA =

Gaelic games club in County Waterford, Ireland

- Naomh Slánaitheoir CLG
- Founded: 1980
- County: Waterford
- Colours: White and black
- Coordinates: 52°14′29.20″N 7°08′14.89″W

Playing kits
Standard colours

Senior Club Championships
	All Ireland	Munster champions	Waterford champions
Football:	-	-	1

St Saviour's GAA Club is a football and hurling club founded in 1980 in Ballybeg, Waterford, in the Republic of Ireland.

== Facilities ==
The club's facilities include a clubhouse, dressing rooms, gym, and floodlit training area. Construction is almost complete on a wall behind one of the goals, with ball-stoppers due to be installed behind each goal.

== Honours ==
The club has won almost every honour in the county. The club's early years included several wins in under-age "A" grades. While not as successful during the 1990s, the club won the County Senior Football title for the first time ever. Later victories include U-16 county titles in both hurling and football.

- Waterford Senior Football Championships (1): 1998 (runners-up 1988)
- Waterford Intermediate Football Championships (1): 1987
- Waterford Intermediate Hurling Championships (1): 1991
- Waterford Minor Football Championships (2): 1986, 1987
- Waterford Under-21 Football Championships (1): 1988
- Waterford Minor Hurling Championships (1): 1993
