= Waterford Senior Football Championship =

Annual Gaelic football competition

- Irish: Cluiche Ceannais; Peile an Chontae
- Founded: 1886
- Title holders: Rathgormack (14th title)
- Most titles: Dungarvan & Stradbally (19 titles)

Waterford Senior Football Championship is an annual Gaelic football competition between the top Waterford clubs.

The winners of the Waterford Championship qualify to represent their county in the Munster Senior Club Football Championship, the winners of which progress to the All-Ireland Senior Club Football Championship.

The current senior football champions are Rathgormack who defeated The Nire in the 2026 final.

== Roll of honour ==
#	Club	Wins	Years won
1	Dungarvan	19	1892, 1893, 1908, 1916, 1926, 1927, 1928, 1929, 1930, 1937, 1938, 1945, 1946, 1947, 1948, 1954, 1990, 1991, 1992
1	Stradbally	19	1940, 1941, 1942, 1943, 1944, 1972, 1980, 1982, 1987, 2001, 2002, 2003, 2004, 2005, 2009, 2010, 2012, 2015, 2017
3	Kilrossanty	15	1888, 1919, 1939, 1949, 1950,1951, 1952, 1957, 1960, 1964, 1983, 1985, 1986, 1988, 1989
4	Rathgormack	14	1909, 1910, 1912, 1913, 1914, 1918, 1995, 1996, 1999, 2019, 2023, 2024, 2025, 2026
5	The Nire	11	1993, 1994, 1997, 2000, 2006, 2008, 2014, 2016, 2018, 2021, 2022
6	Clashmore	9	1886, 1890, 1903, 1904, 1905, 1906, 1907, 1920, 1925
7	Ballinacourty	7	1978, 1979, 1981, 2007, 2011, 2013, 2020
8	De La Salle	6	1931, 1933, 1934, 1935, 1936, 1958
9	Mount Sion	5	1953, 1955, 1956, 1959, 1961
10	Lismore	4	1899, 1901, 1902, 1911
10	Kill	4	1962, 1966, 1967, 1968
12	Erins Hope Dungarvan	3	1896, 1897, 1898
12	Aglish	3	1915, 1922, 1923
12	John Mitchels	3	1970, 1973, 1976
12	Tramore	3	1969, 1971, 1984
16	Windgap	2	1894, 1895
16	Ardmore	2	1965, 1977
18	Ballysaggart	1	1885
18	Ballyduff Lower	1	1887
18	Ballinameela/Aglish	1	1889
18	Finnegan Fusiliers	1	1917
18	Ballyduff Upper	1	1924
18	Fenor	1	1932
18	Brickey Rangers	1	1963
18	Affane	1	1974
18	Dunhill	1	1975
18	St. Saviours	1	1998

== List of finals ==
Year	Winner	Score	Opponent	Score	Man of The Match
2026	Rathgormack	2-13	The Nire	0-10	Billy Power
2025	Rathgormack	1-12	The Nire	1-10	Glen Power
2024	Rathgormack	2-10	Ballinacourty	0-08	James Power
2023	Rathgormack	1-09	The Nire	0-06	Jason Curry
2022	The Nire	0-10	Rathgormack	0-08	Conor Gleeson
2021	The Nire	1-07	Rathgormack	0-09	Dermot Ryan
2020	Ballinacourty	0-13	Rathgormack	0-10	Patrick Hurney
2019	Rathgormack	2-06	Ballinacourty	1-06	William Hahessy
2018	The Nire	0-09	Kilrossanty	0-07	Darren Guiry
2017	Stradbally	1-15	The Nire	1-14	Robert Ahearne
2016	The Nire	1-17	Ballinacourty	0-08	Liam Lawlor
2015	Stradbally	0-08	Ballinacourty	0-06	Shane Lannon
2014	The Nire	0-11	Stradbally	0-06	Conor Gleeson
2013	Ballinacourty	0-12	Stradbally	0-05	Gary Hurney
2012	Stradbally	1-08	The Nire	0-10	Michael Walsh
2011	Ballinacourty	0-06	Stradbally	0-05	Shane Briggs
2010	Stradbally	0-09	Ballinacourty	1-05	
2009	Stradbally	2-05	The Nire	0-09	
2008	The Nire	0-12	Ballinacourty	0-08	
2007	Ballinacourty	3-04	Ardmore	1-07	
2006	The Nire	1-05	Stradbally	0-03	
2005	Stradbally	1-08	The Nire	1-04	
2004	Stradbally	2-08	The Nire	1-04	
2003	Stradbally	1-11	Tramore	0-08	
2002	Stradbally	0-12	The Nire	0-10	
2001	Stradbally	1-13	Rathgormack	2-04	
2000	The Nire	1-11	Kilrossanty	1-08	
1999	Rathgormack	1-09	Stradbally	0-09	
1998	St. Saviours	1-10	Kilrossanty	1-09	
1997	The Nire	1-08	Dungarvan	0-04	
1996	Rathgormack	2-09	Gaultier	0-11	
1995	Rathgormack	0-15	Kilrossanty	2-03	
1994	The Nire	2-09	Gaultier	0-11	
1993	The Nire	2-07	Dungarvan	1-09	
1992	Dungarvan	3-08	Rathgormack	2-11	
1991	Dungarvan	1-09	Stradbally	1-06	
1990	Dungarvan	1-06	Stradbally	0-08	
1989	Kilrossanty	1-04	The Nire	1-03	
1988	Kilrossanty	2-07	St. Saviour's	0-08	
1987	Stradbally	1-09	The Nire	1-05	
1986	Kilrossanty	3-13	Kilmacthomas	0-03	
1985	Kilrossanty	2-08	Tramore	0-07	
1984	Tramore	1-09	Ballinameela	0-04	
1983	Kilrossanty	1-10	Ferrybank	1-07	
1982	Stradbally	1-08	Clashmore	1-05	
1981	Ballinacourty	2-14	Ardmore	0-06	
1980	Stradbally	2-10	Dunhill	1-04	
1979	Ballinacourty	1-12	Ferrybank	1-11	
1978	Ballinacourty	0-13	Clashmore	2-04	
1977	Ardmore	2-06	Stradbally	0-11	
1976	John Mitchels	2-07	Dunhill	1-04	
1975	Dunhill	1-08	Tramore	0-04	
1974	Affane	1-08	Dunhill	0-06	
1973	John Mitchels	3-08	Affane	2-07	
1972	Stradbally	3-04	Kill	1-06	
1971	Tramore	5-08	John Mitchels	2-04	
1970	John Mitchels	1-14	Kill	1-10	
1969	Tramore	0-05	Geraldines	0-03	
1968	Kill	2-08	Tramore	3-02	
1967	Kill	1-08	John Mitchels	1-03	
1966	Kill	0-07	Kilrossanty	1-02	
1965	Ardmore	1-11	Mount Sion	0-02	
1964	Kilrossanty	2-03	Ardmore	0-08	
1963	Brickey Rangers	2-08	Kill	1-02	
1962	Kill	1-11	Geraldines	2-02	
1961	Mount Sion	3-05	Stradbally	2-03	
1960	Kilrossanty	1-03	Brickey Rangers	0-05	
1959	Mount Sion	2-04	De La Salle	1-02	
1958	De La Salle	1-07 (Replay)	Kill	1-05	
1957	Kilrossanty	1-06	Mount Sion	1-04	
1956	Mount Sion	3-02	Dungarvan	2-04	
1955 ^{[A]}	Mount Sion	1-06	Brickey Rangers	0-06	
1954	Dungarvan	1-05	St Otteran's	0-07	
1953	Mount Sion	2-05	Brickey Rangers	1-05	
1952	Kilrossanty	1-05	Kill	0-06	
1951	Kilrossanty	1-01	Kill	1-00	
1950	Kilrossanty	1-05	Old Parish	0-02	
1949	Kilrossanty	1-07	Dungarvan	0-02	
1948	Dungarvan	4-03	Fenor	1-05	
1947 ^{[B]}	Dungarvan		Brickey Rangers		
1946	Dungarvan	3-02	Kilrossanty	0-00	
1945	Dungarvan	1-03	Stradbally	0-01	
1944	Stradbally	1-05	Kilrossanty	0-02	
1943	Stradbally	0-06	Kilrossanty	0-02	
1942	Stradbally	1-05	Kilrossanty	1-04	
1941	Stradbally	0-05	Dungarvan	1-01	
1940	Stradbally	2-06	Kilrossanty	0-03	
1939	Kilrossanty	3-05	Stradbally	2-02	
1938	Dungarvan	2-04	Kilrossanty	0-04	
1937	Dungarvan	2-02	Fenor	1-03	
1936	De La Salle	1-05	Stradbally	0-01	
1935	De La Salle	4-05	Dungarvan	1-03	
1934	De La Salle	1-04	Dungarvan	1-00	
1933	De La Salle	1-04	Dungarvan	0-04	
1932	Fenor	3-05	Brickey Rangers	0-00	
1931	De La Salle	1-04	Dungarvan	0-01	
1930	Dungarvan	2-03	Rathgormack	1-01	
1929	Dungarvan	8-02	Fenor	2-02	
1928 ^{[C]}	Dungarvan				
1927 ^{[D]}	Dungarvan	2-05	O'Rourkes	1-04	
1926	Dungarvan	1-03	Rathgormack	1-01	
1925	Clashmore	0-02	Ring	0-01	
1924	Ballyduff Upper	4-03	Rathgormack	2-00	
1923	Aglish	1-01	Rathgormack	0-01	
1922	Aglish	2-01	Clashmore	0-01	
1921					
1920	Clashmore	0-04	Rathgormack	0-03	
1919	Kilrossanty	3-04	Ballymacaw	0-01	
1918	Rathgormack				
1917	Finnegans Fusiliers				
1916	Dungarvan				
1915	Aglish	1-01	Rathgormack	0-01	
1914	Rathgormack	1-03	Aglish	1-00	
1913	Rathgormack	0-04	Blackwater Ramblers	0-01	
1912	Rathgormack	2-00	Blackwater Ramblers	0-01	
1911	Lismore		Rathgormack		
1910	Rathgormack	3-04	Dungarvan	1-00	
1909	Rathgormack	3-04	Dungarvan	1-00	
1908	Dungarvan		Dunhill		
1907	Clashmore		De La Salle		
1906	Clashmore		Kilrossanty		
1905	Clashmore				
1904	Clashmore	0-03	Kinsalebeg	0-02	
1903 ^{[E]}	Clashmore	0-01	Lismore	1-01	
1902	Lismore		Ardmore		
1901	Lismore		Kilrossanty		
1900					
1899	Lismore	0-08	Kilmacthomas	1-03	
1898	Erin's Hope, Dungarvan		Erin's Hope, Dungarvan		
1897	Erin's Hope, Dungarvan				
1896	Erin's Hope, Dungarvan		Erin's Hope, Dungarvan		
1895	Windgap	1-03	Dungarvan	0-03	
1894	Windgap		Kilrossanty		
1893	Dungarvan				
1892	Dungarvan	0-05	Aglish	0-00	
1891	Kinsalebeg				
1890	Shandon Rovers, Dungarvan		Kinsalebeg		
1889	Ballinameela/Aglish		Clodagh Campaigners		
1888	Kilrossanty	0-04	Fenor	0-00	
1887	Ballyduff Lower	0-03	Kilrossanty	0-02	
1886	Kinsalebeg		Kilrossanty		
1885	Ballysaggart		Kinsalebeg		
