= Abbeyside, Dungarvan =

Townland in County Waterford, Ireland

Abbeyside Dún na Mainistreach
- Townland
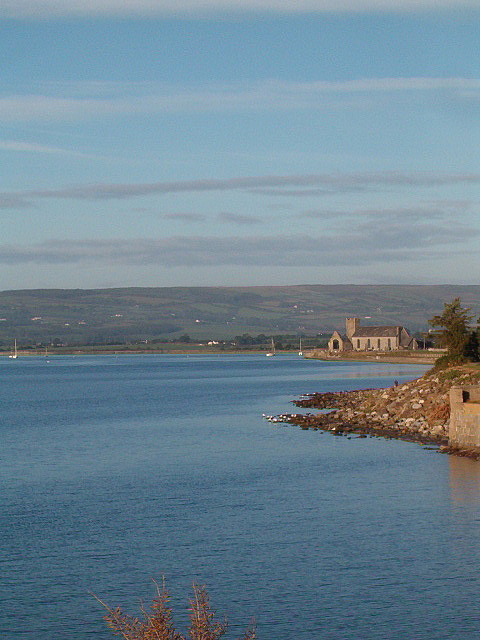
- Abbeyside Church from Abbeyside Cove

- Abbeyside shown within Ireland
- Coordinates: 52°06′00″N 7°37′00″W
- Country: Ireland
- County: County Waterford
- Barony: Decies-without-Drum
- Civil parish: Dungarvan

Area
  - Total: 71.62 ha (177.0 acres)

Abbeyside (Irish: Dún na Mainistreach, meaning 'fort of the monastery') is a townland in Dungarvan in County Waterford, Ireland. It lies on the east bank of the Colligan River.

== History ==
MacGrath's Castle was a notable landmark in Abbeyside, overlooking Dungarvan Harbour, until it collapsed in January 1916. It was situated at Friar's Walk in Abbeyside, near the Augustinian abbey. It was a six-storey tower house, reputedly built by the MacGrath family, and labelled MacCragh's Castle in the Civil Survey of 1654. While, as of the mid-18th century, it was still in a "good state of preservation", by the mid-20th century only fragments of the walls remained. These were subsequently removed, and no remnants of the castle remain visible above ground.

== Sport ==
The local GAA club is Abbeyside/Ballinacourty GAA. The club plays both hurling and gaelic football and competes in both senior codes in the county.

The village also has a local soccer team, Abbeyside AFC, the team plays in the Waterford District league Division 1B, the club's most successful moment came in 2011 winning the 1B division. The club also have a u14 team youths and a division 3 team.

Stage 2 of the 1998 Tour de France passed through Abbeyside.

== Notable people ==
- Ernest Thomas Sinton Walton (6 October 1903 – 25 June 1995), physicist and Nobel Laureate was born in Abbeyside. Walton is known for his work with John Cockcroft on the splitting of the atom. The "Walton Causeway Park" in Abbeyside was dedicated in his honour. Walton himself attended the ceremony in 1989. After his death, a plaque was placed on the site of his birthplace in Abbeyside.
- Louis Claude Purser (28 September 1854 – 20 March 1932), classical scholar, was born here.
- Sarah Purser (22 March 1848 - 1943), portrait painter, was raised in Abbeyside.
