= The Nire–Fourmilewater GAA =

Gaelic games club in County Waterford, Ireland

The Nire—Fourmilewater GAA Club
- An Uidhir—Caisleán Cuanach
- County: Waterford
- Colours: Yellow and Blue (football), Blue and White (hurling)
- Coordinates: 52°16′14.60″N 7°43′28.31″W

Playing kits
Standard colours

Senior Club Championships
	All Ireland	Munster champions	Waterford champions
Football:	-	-	11
Ladies' football:	10	16	45

The Nire—Fourmilewater GAA is a Gaelic Athletic Association club based in Ballymacarbry, County Waterford in Ireland. The Nire (An Uidhir) and Fourmilewater (Caislean Cuanach) are two separate clubs, with separate committees pulling from the same pool of players. The Nire is the Gaelic football club in the area and Fourmilewater the hurling club. Both teams play in the Mill Field, Ballymacarbry. The Nire is a half parish with Touraneena, while Fourmilewater is a half parish with Newcastle, County Tipperary. The Nire play in yellow and blue, while Fourmilewater play in blue and white. The related Ballymacarby Ladies' Gaelic football club has won 10 All-Ireland Ladies' Club Football Championship titles.

== History ==
The Nire and Fourmilewater are two separate clubs, with separate committees pulling from the same pool of players. The Nire is a half parish with Touraneena, while Fourmilewater is a half parish with Newcastle, County Tipperary. Both teams play in the Mill Field, Ballymacarbry.

The Nire, which was founded in 1929, is the football club in the area and Fourmilewater, founded in 1926, is the hurling club. The local Ladies Gaelic football club was founded in 1970 and named Ballymacarbry.

== Football ==
Founded in 1929, The Nire gained promotion to the Senior ranks when they won the Waterford Intermediate Football Championship in 1983. They have been senior ever since, in that time they have gone on to win 11 Waterford Senior Football Championship.

At U-21 (A) level, The Nire have been county champions on three occasions, in 1977, 1986 and 2004. In 2004, they defeated Ballinacourty 0-9 to 0-8 in the Western Final and went on to beat Portlaw–St Molleran's in the county final.

At minor (A) level (U-18), The Nire won their 3rd A title in 2014, having defeated Stradbally by 3-11 to 0-6 on 14 May 2014. The Nire had previously won 2 minor county championships, the first in 2007 where they defeated De La Salle in the final and the second in 2008 where they recorded a victory over Roanmore.

=== Honours ===
The Nire's football honours include:

- Waterford Senior Football Championships (11): 1993, 1994, 1997, 2000, 2006, 2008, 2014 2016, 2018, 2021, 2022
- Waterford Intermediate Football Championships (2): 1971, 1983
- Waterford Junior Football Championships (1): 1942
- Waterford Under-21 Football Championships (3): 1977, 1986, 2004
- Waterford Minor Football Championships (3): 2007, 2008, 2014

=== Notable footballers ===
- Darren Guiry
- Dylan Guiry - Waterford footballer
- Thomas O'Gorman - Waterford footballer
- Maurice O'Gorman - Waterford footballer and Munster interpro regular
- James McGrath - Waterford footballer
- Michael O'Gorman
- Brian Wall - former Waterford footballer

== Hurling ==
Fourmilewater Hurling Club have been senior since 2002. They beat Dunhill in the 2001 Waterford Intermediate Hurling Championship final.

In 2026, Fourmilewater reached their first ever Waterford Senior Hurling Championship final where they were defeated 1-16 to 0-15 by Ballygunner.

=== Honours ===
- Waterford Intermediate Hurling Championships (3): 1979, 1989, 2001
- Waterford Junior Hurling Championships (2): 1955, 1963
- Waterford Minor hurling Championships (1): 1973

=== Notable hurlers ===
- Jamie Barron - Waterford hurler
- Conor Gleeson - Waterford hurler who, together with Jamie Barron, represented Waterford at senior hurling during the 2010s and played in the 2020 All-Ireland Senior Hurling Championship Final.
- Liam Lawlor - Waterford hurler
- Michael Ryan
- Shane Walsh

== Ladies Gaelic football ==
Founded in 1970, Ballymacarbry LGFC are one of the most successful ladies' club teams of all time. The club had several successes in the 1980s and 1990s under the stewardship of Michael Ryan. The County title has been won every year since 1982 and as of 2023 they had won 42 in a row, a significant record. They have also won a record ten All Ireland club titles and the Waterford ladies' team that captured 5 All Irelands in the 1990s were predominantly made up of Ballymacarbry players.

=== Honours ===
- All-Ireland Ladies' Club Football Championship (10): 1987, 1989, 1990, 1991, 1992, 1993, 1994, 1995, 1997, 1998
- Munster Ladies' Senior Club Football Championship (16): 1985, 1987, 1988, 1989, 1990, 1991, 1992, 1993, 1994, 1995, 1997, 1998, 1999, 2000, 2022, 2023
- Waterford Ladies' Senior Football Championship (45): 1971, 1973, 1975, 1982, 1983, 1984, 1985, 1986, 1987, 1988, 1989, 1990, 1991, 1992, 1993, 1994, 1995, 1996, 1997, 1998, 1999, 2000, 2001, 2002, 2003, 2004, 2005, 2006, 2007, 2008, 2009, 2010, 2011, 2012, 2013, 2014, 2015, 2016, 2017, 2018, 2019, 2020, 2021, 2022, 2023

=== Notable LGFC players ===
- Áine Wall
