= Kilrossanty GAA =

Gaelic games club in County Waterford, Ireland

Kilrossanty
- Cill Rosanta
- Founded: 1886
- County: Waterford
- Nickname: The Rossies
- Colours: Green And Gold
- Grounds: Pairc Naomh Bríd
- Coordinates: 52°09′58″N 7°31′03″W

Playing kits
Standard colours

Senior Club Championships
	All Ireland	Munster champions	Waterford champions
Football:	-	-	15
Ladies' football:	–	–	2

Kilrossanty GAA is a Gaelic Athletic Association (GAA) club located in Lemybrien, County Waterford, Ireland. The club is named for the nearby village of Kilrossanty. It plays home games at Pairc Naomh Brid. Kilrossanty is one of the oldest GAA clubs in Waterford and one of the larger Gaelic Football clubs there.

The club also plays underage hurling and has fielded a number of adult hurling teams on many occasions. They won the Junior B Hurling title in 1990 and 2016. In the latter, they defeated Mount Sion 1–20 to 07

In the early days of the GAA, Kerry GAA wore red and green as their colours. In 1903, they travelled east to play a tournament in Dungarvan and accidentally left the green and red jerseys at home. Percy Kirwan borrowed the green and gold kit off local club Kilrossanty and following a strong performance, they decided to adopt the colours.

== History ==
Kilrossanty was founded in 1885 and took part in the first Waterford Senior Football Championship the following year. The club reached its first final in 1886 and reached the finals again the following year, before winning its first title in 1888, without recording a single score against them. In the 1888 final, Kilrossanty won their first senior football title by beating Fenor 0–3 to 0-0.

Kilrossanty won fifteen Waterford Senior Football titles. They hold the distinction of being the Waterford club to have held on to their senior status the longest without relegation to intermediate ranks. On winning the junior title in 1937, Kilrossanty was promoted to the senior grade, where they remained until at least the late 20th century.

In 2024, the club won a Munster Junior Club Hurling Championship semi-final to secure a place in the 2024 Munster JHC final.

== Honours ==
- Waterford Senior Football Championships (15): 1888, 1919, 1939, 1949, 1950, 1951, 1952, 1957, 1960, 1964, 1983, 1985, 1986, 1988, 1989
- Waterford Junior Football Championships (6): 1918, 1926, 1937, 1998, 2010, 2013
- Waterford Minor Football Championships (2): 2004, 2016 (Div 3)
- Waterford Under-21 Football Championships (4): 1983, 1992, 1993, 2011
- Waterford Under-20 Hurling Championships (2): 2022 (B), 2023 (C)
- Waterford Junior A Hurling Championship (1): 2025
- Waterford Junior B Hurling Championships (2): 1990, 2016
- Waterford Minor Hurling Division 3 Championships (1): 2018

== Notable players ==
- Tom Riordan
- Darren Mulhearne
