= Abbeyside–Ballinacourty GAA =

Gaelic sports club in County Waterford, Ireland

Abbeyside–Ballinacourty GAA Club
- Dún na Mainistreach–Baile na Cúirte CLCG
- Founded: 1967
- County: Waterford
- Nickname: The Village / Courty
- Colours: Blue and Orange Hoops; Green and White Hoops
- Grounds: Clash, Ballinacourty
- Coordinates: 52°05′09.03″N 7°33′31.27″W

Playing kits
Abbeyside	Ballinacourty

Senior Club Championships
	All Ireland	Munster champions	Waterford champions
Football:	0	0	7
Hurling:	0	0	0

Abbeyside–Ballincourty GAA Club is a Gaelic Athletic Association club based in Abbeyside, County Waterford, Ireland. The club plays both hurling and Gaelic football and competes in both senior codes in County Waterford.

The club in its present incarnation was formed from the merger of Abbeyside Hurling Club and Ballinacourty Football club in 1967. In essence, the present club can trace its way back to 1927 when Abbeyside Hurling Club was formed. Ballinacourty Football Club was formed later in 1947.

The club still uses two separate names depending on which sport they are playing. The name Abbeyside is still used as the name for its hurling teams, while its football teams still go under the name of Ballinacourty. The club was the 2007 Waterford club of the year

== Honours ==
- Waterford Senior Football Championships: 7
  - 1978, 1979, 1981, 2007, 2011, 2013, 2020
- Waterford Intermediate Hurling Championship 2
  - 1996, 2003
- West Waterford Intermediate Hurling Championship 4
  - 1994, 1996, 2000, 2003
- Waterford Intermediate Football Championship 2
  - 1965, 1998
- West Waterford Intermediate Football Championship 2
  - 1965, 1998
- Waterford Junior Hurling Championship 3
  - 1950, 2007, 2008
- West Waterford Junior A Hurling Championship 6
  - 1946, 1950, 1966, 2007, 2008, 2013
- Waterford Junior Football Championship 2
  - 2007, 2009
- West Waterford Junior Football Championship 3
  - 2004, 2007, 2009
- West Waterford Junior B Hurling Championship 3
  - 1996, 2002, 2003
- Waterford Junior B Football Championship 1
  - 2015
- West Waterford Junior B Football Championship 5
  - 1995, 1996, 1999, 2000, 2015
- Waterford Under-21 A Hurling Championship 4
  - 1966, 2004, 2006, 2007
- West Waterford Under-21 A Hurling Championship 7
  - 1966, 1970, 2004, 2006, 2007, 2016, 2017
- Waterford Under-21 A Football Championship 12
  - 1970, 1971, 1979, 1998, 2003, 2005, 2006, 2007, 2008, 2012, 2017, 2018
- West Waterford Under-21 A Football Championship 14
  - 1969, 1970, 1971, 1979, 1982, 1998, 2003, 2005, 2006, 2007, 2008, 2012, 2013, 2015
- Waterford Minor A Hurling Championship: 4
  - 1970, 1976, 2003, 2004
- West Waterford Minor A Hurling Championship: 11
  - 1950, 1955, 1957, 1958, 1970, 1976, 1998, 2002, 2003, 2004, 2005
- Waterford Minor Football Championship: 16
  - 1950 (at St. Augustine Rovers), 1951 (as St. Augustine Rovers), 1952 (as Abbeyside), 1959, 1970, 1976, 1980, 1981, 1982, 1994, 1995, 2001, 2002, 2003, 2005, 2015
- West Waterford Minor A Football Championship:20
  - 1950, 1951, 1952, 1953, 1959, 1963, 1970, 1975, 1976, 1979, 1980, 1981, 1982, 1993, 1994, 1995, 2001, 2002, 2003, 2005

== Notable players ==
- Dom Enright
- Greg Fives
- Austin Flynn
- Richie Foley
- Gary Hurney
- Michael Kiely
- Tony Mansfield
- Neil Montgomery
- Johnny O'Connor
- Conor Prunty
- Donal Whelan
