= Waterford GAA =

County board of the Gaelic Athletic Association in Ireland

- Irish: Port Láirge
- Nickname(s): The Déise; The Gentle County
- Province: Munster
- Dominant sport: Hurling
- Ground(s): Walsh Park, Waterford; Fraher Field, Dungarvan
- County colours: White Blue

County teams
- NFL: Division 1
- NHL: Division 1A
- Football Championship: Sam Maguire Cup
- Hurling Championship: Liam MacCarthy Cup
- Ladies' Gaelic football: Brendan Martin Cup
- Camogie: Kay Mills Cup

The Waterford County Board of the Gaelic Athletic Association (GAA) (Irish: Cumann Lúthchleas Gael Coiste Phort Láirge) or Waterford GAA is one of the 32 county boards of the GAA in Ireland, and is responsible for all levels of Gaelic games in County Waterford. The County Board is also responsible for the Waterford county teams. The county board's offices are based at Walsh Park in the city of Waterford. The Waterford County Board was founded in 1886.

Hurling is the dominant sport, with the county having won the All-Ireland Senior Hurling Championship (SHC) on two occasions: in 1948 and 1959,

== Governance ==
Founded in 1886, the Waterford GAA board administers Gaelic games at all levels in County Waterford. This includes the sports of hurling, football, handball and rounders. The board officiates over both senior and underage competitions and both championship and league competitions in the county. The board is also responsible for both hurling and football county teams. The county is known prominently as The Déise, after the name of an ancient Irish kingdom which covered a vast part of modern County Waterford.

=== Colours and crest ===
Old crest

Waterford's original jersey

Waterford's present colours are white and blue. Both county teams play in white shirts, with blue trim along with blue shorts and blue socks. Prior to 2002, the county wore white shorts. Waterford is one of only three counties whose uniforms are not manufactured by O'Neills; instead, they are made by Waterford-based Azzurri Sportswear (O'Neills did manufacture Waterford's jerseys up until 2002). Waterford hurling and football are Currently sponsored by Suir Engineering, and have been since 2024.

While the current jersey is white with blue trim, Waterford's original jersey was royal blue and white, with white shorts and blue socks. The change to the current jersey was made in 1936. Today, Waterford uses a blue jersey as its second jersey in case of a clash of colours.

The present crest was introduced in 2009 and features three Viking longboats from the crest of the city of Waterford, and a representation of the round tower in Ardmore. The crest introduced in 2009 was a further refinement of a crest introduced in 2003. The new crest replaced the original crest of the city of Waterford. The new crest was introduced as the Waterford GAA board were unable to copyright the old one due to it being a civil crest.

== Hurling ==
=== Clubs ===
Clubs contest the Waterford Senior Hurling Championship. That competition's most successful club is Mount Sion, with 35 titles.

Other competitions include:

- Waterford Intermediate Hurling Championship
- Waterford Junior Hurling Championship
- Waterford Under-21 Hurling Championship
- Waterford Minor Hurling Championship

1981–82 All-Ireland Senior Club Hurling Championship: Mount Sion would win the county's first Munster club title, defeating South Liberties of Limerick in the final. James Stephens of Kilkenny would defeat Mount Sion by 3-13 (22) to 3-8 (17) in the All-Ireland final.

Ballygunner was the first club from Waterford to win the All Ireland Senior Club Hurling Championship in 2021–22 and in 2025–26. They are the most successful club in Munster with 6 Munster Senior Club Hurling Championships (2001, 2018, 2021, 2022, 2023, 2025)

=== County team ===
The Waterford County Board was established in 1886 in Kilmacthomas and played in the Munster Championship for the first time in 1888, losing to Cork on a score of 2–8 to 0-0. Waterford would win a championship match for the first time in 1903, defeating Kerry by 5–6 to 2–9. In their first Munster final in 1904, Waterford would lose to Cork. Waterford would not win another senior championship match until 1925 when Clare were defeated, only for Tipperary to beat them in only their second Munster final. Despite its present reputation as a hurling stronghold, football was initially the preferred Gaelic sport in Waterford: the county was one of only nine to compete in the inaugural All-Ireland football championship in 1887. It would be the last of the Munster counties to win a provincial or All-Ireland SHC title.

An 110-point win over Cork in the 1938 Munster semi-final saw Waterford into their seventh Munster final, where they defeated Clare by 3–5 to 2–5 marking their first Munster Senior Hurling Championship. They reached the county's first ever All-Ireland final after a win over Galway, where they lost to Dublin in Croke Park by 2-5 (11) to 1-6 (9). The following year, Waterford played in their first National Hurling League final, losing to Dublin by 1-8 (11) to 1-4 (7).

In 1948 Waterford defeatied Clare by two points in the Munster semi-final. Waterford prevailed by a score of 4-7 (19) to 3-9 (18) in the Munster final against Cork. Galway were overcome in the All-Ireland semi-final, and Dublin were beaten, on a score of 6-7 (25) to 4-2 (14) to win Waterfords first All Ireland Championship.

Waterford would not reach another Munster final until 1957. Galway were the first opponents in that year's Munster championship, and were beaten, 7-11 (32) to 0–8. Tipperary were waiting in the semi-final and defeated 9-3 (30) to 3-4 (13). The county's fourth Munster title was secured with a three-point win over Cork in Thurles. In the All-Ireland final, Kilkenny scored a string of goals, and with minutes remaining Waterford found themselves in the position of having outscored Kilkenny by seven yet being three points behind. A late goal by Seamus Power ensured a draw, 1–17 to 5-5. The replay was won by Waterford securing the county's second All-Ireland title, 3-12 (21) to 1-10 (13).

The 1963 League final against Tipperary had Waterford win an eventful match by 2-15 (21) to 4–7 (19) – the 'Home' final as the winners were due to meet New York for the title proper. Waterford edged a tense affair by 0–11 to 0–8 in the 1963 Munster final. In the All-Ireland final, Kilkenny were inspired by a 14-point haul from Eddie Keher to a 4-17 (29) to 6-8 (26) victory. There was some consolation for Waterford in the National Hurling League final 'proper', where after a scare in a drawn first game (3-6 to 3–6) Waterford won the replay against New York by 3-10 (19) to 1-10 (13) for the first National League title. Waterford would not win another senior title for nearly fifty years. 1974 brought the county's first All Star award, won by John Galvin.

An excellent run in the National League saw Waterford reach their first final since 1963 in 1998. A tight match in the final saw Cork pull away for a win by 2-14 (20) to 0–13.

In 2002 Waterford beat Cork, with a late point from Ken McGrath and a 1-16 (19) to 1-15 (18) victory in the semi-final. The reigning Munster and All-Ireland champions Tipperary were favourites in the Munster final. A spectacular display of shooting from Waterford lead 2-23 (29) to 3-12 (21) victory for the first Munster title in 39 years. Fergal Hartley, Eoin Kelly and Ken McGrath were selected for All Star awards in the 2002 season.

The 2004 National League saw Waterford reach their seventh final, secured by finishing top of a second phase of group games thanks to a late equalising point from Paul Flynn against Tipperary. There was more disappointment though as Galway were convincing 2-15 (21) to 1-13 (16) winners.

To regain the Munster title, Waterford had to beat Clare and Tipperary just to reach the final. Waterford trounced Clare by 3-21 (30) to 1-8 (11), with a hat-trick of goals from Dan Shanahan. The semi-final was a much tighter affair, with a late goal from sub Paul O'Brien needed to beat Tipperary by 4-10 (22) to 3-12 (21). The final against Cork turned on a dipping medium range free from Paul Flynn that surprised the Cork backs for a goal. Waterford secured their seventh Munster title with one point, 1-21 (24) to 3-16 (25), win. The All-Ireland semi-final saw another clash with Kilkenny and another three-point defeat, a first-half salvo of three goals giving Waterford a mountain that proved too difficult to climb. Paul Flynn's tally of 0–13 against Kilkenny would earn him his first All Star award, with Dan Shanahan also getting his first and Ken McGrath winning his second, only the second Waterford man after John Galvin to win multiple All Stars.

The 2007 season ended with a record five All Star awards, Tony Browne, Dan Shanahan and Ken McGrath winning their third awards and Stephen Molumphy and Michael Walsh their first. Shanahan was further rewarded by being named Hurler of the Year.

A win against Wexford in 2008 led Waterford to their sixth All-Ireland Semi-Final since 1998. The opponents would be a highly fancied Tipperary, who were reigning National Hurling League and Munster champions. Waterford started a blistering page, going six points to nil up after only 10 minutes. However, Tipperary were level going in at half time. Both teams scored goals in rapid succession in the second half. Waterford's nerve held and they managed to win by two points on a scoreline of Waterford 1-20 Tipperary 1–18. It was Waterford's first semi-final win since 1963 and brought to an end a run of five consecutive semi-final defeats. They met an inspired Kilkenny team in the All-Ireland final, who ran out 3–30 to 1-13 winners.

Waterford defeated Clare in the 2010 Munster Semi-Final and won their ninth Munster title when they defeated Cork after extra time with a goal from Dan Shanahan in a replay in Thurles. The All-Ireland semi-final saw them lose at that stage for the seventh time in thirteen years, beaten by seven points by Tipperary. In May 2015, Waterford in Derek McGrath's second year as manager won their first league title since 2007 after a 1–24 to 0–17 win against Cork in the final.

In 2017 and 2020, Waterford reached the final of the All Ireland Senior Hurling Championship were they lost against Galway and Limerick, respectively.

In 2022, Waterford won the National League for the fourth time.

== Football ==
=== Clubs ===
- Waterford Senior Football Championship: The current senior football champions are Rathgormack who defeated Ballinacourty in the 2019 final on an underwhelming scoreline of 2–06 to 1–06 with William Hahessy receiving the man of the match award. Ballinacourty struggled to cope with the lightning pace of the young Rathgormack side.
- Waterford Minor Football Championship
- Waterford Under-21 Football Championship
- Waterford Intermediate Football Championship
- Waterford Junior Football Championship

=== County team ===
The team's greatest achievement is reaching the 1898 All-Ireland Senior Football Championship Final, a game which was lost to Dublin by a scoreline of 2–08 to 0–04. Erin's Hope of Dungarvan represented the county in that game.

Waterford has not reached a Munster Senior Football Championship (SFC) final since 1960, has not defeated Kerry since 1957, Cork since 1960, Limerick since 1981 and Tipperary since 1988. On 20 May 2007, the team broke a 19-year run without a senior championship win by defeating Clare at Fraher Field, Dungarvan. The team defeated Clare again in 2010.

== Camogie ==
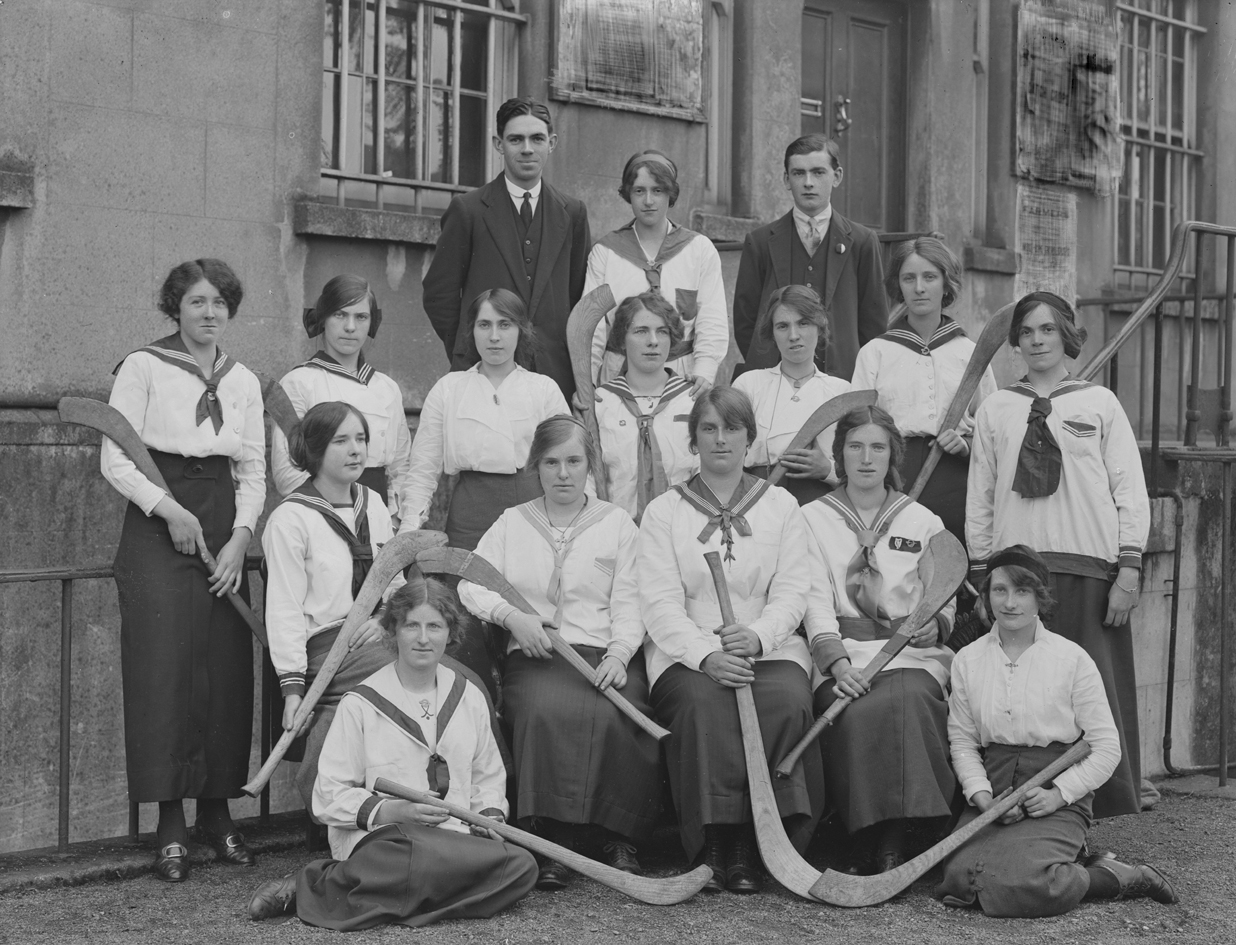
Camogie team in Waterford, 1915

Waterford hosted the All-Ireland Senior Camogie Championship final of 1945, at a time Cork were in dispute with the Central Council of the Camogie Association. They became Runners-up in the All-Ireland Senior Camogie Championship both in 1945 and in 2023. They won the All-Ireland Junior Camogie Championship of 2011. Notable players include soaring star award winners Karen Kelly and Áine Lyng and camogie player of the year 2023 Beth Carton.

Under Camogie's National Development Plan 2010–2015, "Our Game, Our Passion," five new camogie clubs are to be established in the county by 2015.

In 2026 there are 19 clubs competing in 14 competitions.

== Ladies' football ==
Waterford were dominant in the 1990s, winning the Brendan Martin Cup five times.

Waterford have the following achievements in ladies' football.

- All-Ireland Senior Ladies' Football Championship: 5
  - 1991, 1992, 1994, 1995, 1998
- All-Ireland Junior Ladies' Football Championship 1
  - 1986
- All-Ireland Under-18 Ladies' Football Championship: 5
  - 1991, 1993, 1996, 1997, 2001
- All-Ireland Under-16 Ladies' Football Championship: 5
  - 1991, 1992, 1995, 1996, 1998
- All-Ireland Under-14 Ladies' Football Championship: 1
  - 1998
