= 2023 Waterford Senior Hurling Championship =

Annual hurling competition season

- Dates: 28 July – 10 September 2023
- Teams: 12
- Sponsor: J. J. Kavanagh & Sons
- Champions: Ballygunner (22nd title); Stephen O'Keeffe (captain); Darragh O'Sullivan (manager)
- Runners-up: De La Salle; Eddie Barrett (captain); Ian Flynn (manager)
- Relegated: Dunhill

Tournament statistics
- Matches played: 26
- Goals scored: 65 (2.5 per match)
- Points scored: 1009 (38.81 per match)
- Top scorer(s): Reuben Halloran (0–54)

The 2023 Waterford Senior Hurling Championship was the 123rd staging of the Waterford Senior Hurling Championship since its establishment by the Waterford County Board in 1897. The draw for the group stage placing took place on 7 February 2023. The championship ran from 28 July to 10 September 2023.

Ballygunner entered the championship as the defending champions in search of a record-breaking 10th successive title. Dunhill were due to be relegated, however, they remained in the championship following Ballygunner's second team victory in the Waterford IHC. They were later relegated after losing all of their group stage and relegation playoff games.

The final was played on 10 September 2023 at Walsh Park in Waterford, between Ballygunner and De La Salle, in what was their fourth meeting in the final overall and a first meeting in four years. Ballygunner won the match by 2–26 to 0–21 to claim their 22nd championship title overall and a record-breaking 10th title in succession.

De La Salle's Reuben Halloran was the championship's top scorer with 0–54.

== Group A ==
=== Group A table ===
Advance to quarter-finals Advance to preliminary quarter-finals

Team	Matches				Score			Pts
Team	Pld	W	D	L	For	Against	Diff	Pts
Ballygunner	2	2	0	0	58	26	32	4
Abbeyside	2	0	1	1	37	45	−8	1
Passage	2	0	1	1	31	55	−24	1

=== Group A results ===
29 July 2023 Round 1	Ballygunner	1–21 – 0–16	Abbeyside	Fraher Field
	Pauric Mahony 0–7, P Fitzgerald 1–3, D Hutchinson 0–5, P Hogan 0–2, H Ruddle 0–2, C Sheahan 0–2.		M O'Halloran 0–8, N Montgomery 0–2, C Treen 0–2, D Walsh 0–1, E Ahearne 0–1, M Power 0–1, R Walsh 0–1.	Referee: T Walsh (Modeligo)

4 August 2023 Round 2	Ballygunner	2–28 – 0–10	Passage	SETU Waterford Arena
	Pauric Mahony 0–12, P Fitzgerald 1–3, J Foley 1–2, D Hutchinson 0–4, H Ruddle 0–2, B O'Keeffe 0–2, M Mahony 0–1, P Leavey 0–1, C Sheahan 0–1.		O Connors 0–7, L Flynn 0–2, G Cullinane 0–1.	Referee: M O'Brien (Portlaw)

13 August 2023 Round 3	Abbeyside	2–15 – 2–15	Passage	Fraher Field
	M O'Halloran 0–8, S Callaghan 1–2, D McGrath 1–0, C Treen 0–2, N Montgomery 0–1, S Whelan-Barrett 0–1, M Kiely 0–1.		M Fitzgerald 1–7, L Flynn 1–3, E Reilly 0–2, M Cox 0–1, D Roche 0–1, E Walsh 0–1.

== Group B ==
=== Group B table ===
Advance to quarter-finals Advance to preliminary quarter-finals

Team	Matches				Score			Pts
Team	Pld	W	D	L	For	Against	Diff	Pts
Fourmilewater	2	2	0	0	51	31	20	4
Mount Sion	2	1	0	1	41	40	1	2
Tallow	2	0	0	2	33	54	−21	0

=== Group B results ===
28 July 2023 Round 1	Mount Sion	0–14 – 2–18	Fourmilewater	St Molleran's Park
	S Roche 0–6, A Gleeson 0–4, PJ Fanning 0–2, L Flanagan 0–1, M O'Neill 0–1.		S Walsh 1–3, M Morrissey 1–3, A Ryan 0–3, C Gleeson 0–2, J Barron 0–1, F Hallinan 0–1, C Walsh 0–1, D Ryan 0–1, T Barron 0–1, E Spellman 0–1, T Guiry 0–1.	Referee: N Barry (Passage)

5 August 2023 Round 2	Mount Sion	3–18 – 1–13	Tallow	Fraher Field
	A Kirwan 1–2, L Flanagan 1–2, M O'Neill 0–4, MF O'Neill 1–0, S Roche 0–3, J Gleeson 0–2, D Power 0–2, PJ Fanning 0–2, M Daykin 0–1.		T Ryan 0–6, D Buckley 1–2, R Grey 0–3, I Beecher 0–1, M Stewart 0–1.

13 August 2023 Round 3	Fourmilewater	2–21 – 2–11	Tallow	Fraher Field
	A Ryan 1–8, M Morrissey 1–1, D Ryan 0–3, O Walsh 0–2, S Walsh 0–2, F Hallinan 0–2, J Barron 0–1, C Gleeson 0–1, C Walsh 0–1.		D Buckley 1–5, J Henley 1–1, R Grey 0–2, I Beecher 0–1, M Tobin 0–1, S Martin 0–1.

== Group C ==
=== Group C table ===
Advance to quarter-finals Advance to preliminary quarter-finals

Team	Matches				Score			Pts
Team	Pld	W	D	L	For	Against	Diff	Pts
Roanmore	2	2	0	0	47	38	9	4
Clonea	2	1	0	1	38	39	−1	2
Lismore	2	0	0	2	40	48	−8	0

=== Group C results ===
29 July 2023 Round 1	Roanmore	2–21 – 1–18	Lismore	Fraher Field
	G O'Brien 0–10, S Mackey 1–3, C Ryan 1–1, Billy Nolan 0–2, Brian Nolan 0–1, C Chester 0–1, L Hearne 0–1, S Burke 0–1, E O'Toole 0–1.		M Shanahan 0–9, O O'Gorman 1–0, B O'Sullivan 0–3, J Prendergast 0–1, I Daly 0–1, C Daly 0–1, F Reaney 0–1, J Prendergast 0–1, J Shanahan 0–1.	Referee: A Fitzgerald (Gaultier)

5 August 2023 Round 2	Roanmore	0–20 – 1–14	Clonea	St Molleran's Park
	G O'Brien 0–11, Billy Nolan 0–2, S Mackey 0–2, S Burke 0–2, E Flynn 0–1, C Chester 0–1, F McGrath 0–1.		B Power 0–6, J Gleeson 1–2, F Roche 0–2, C Kirwan 0–1, J Power 0–1, D Hassett 0–1, R Flynn 0–1.	Referee: N Barry (Passage)

12 August 2023 Round 3	Lismore	0–19 – 1–18	Clonea	Fraher Field
	M Shanahan 0–11, J Prendergast 0–3, B O'Sullivan 0–1, J O'Keeffe 0–1, I Daly 0–1, J Shanahan 0–1, J Lenihan 0–1.		B Power 0–7, J Gleeson 0–5, F Roche 1–1, C Kirwan 0–3, J Power 0–1, K Power 0–1.

== Group D ==
=== Group D table ===
Advance to quarter-finals Advance to preliminary quarter-finals

Team	Matches				Score			Pts
Team	Pld	W	D	L	For	Against	Diff	Pts
De La Salle	2	2	0	0	62	36	26	4
Dungarvan	2	1	0	1	54	43	11	2
Dunhill	2	0	0	2	25	62	−37	0

=== Group D results ===
28 July 2023 Round 1	De La Salle	3–22 – 2–17	Dungarvan	Fraher Field
	R Halloran 0–12, T Douglas 1–5, J Twomey 1–2, S Carton 0–1, B Cunningham 0–1, C Morris 0–1.		M Kiely 0–13, P Curran 2–0, C Curran 0–2, T Loftus 0–2.	Referee: T Mansfield (Cappoquin)

3 August 2023 Round 2	De La Salle	3–22 – 0–13	Dunhill	SETU Waterford Arena
	R Halloran 0–10, T Douglas 2–2, E Meaney 1–2, J Fagan 0–2, C McCann 0–1, D Lalor 0–1, S Carton 0–1, C Keane 0–1, B Cunningham 0–1, J Twomey 0–1.		E Murphy 0–10, D Swit 0–2, S Kavanagh 0–1.	Referee: E Morrissey (Erin's Own)

13 August 2023 Round 3	Dungarvan	3–22 – 0–12	Dunhill	St Molleran's Park
	P Curran 1–12, E O'Callaghan 1–1, D Lyons 1–0, T Loftus 0–3, J Duggan 0–2, C Curran 0–2, J Burke 0–1, C Curran 0–1.		É Murphy 0–9, D Power 0–2, A Greene 0–1.

== Knockout stage ==
=== Preliminary quarter-finals ===
19 August 2023 Preliminary quarter-final	Clonea	4–22 – 2–12	Tallow	Fraher Field
	J Gleeson 2–7, C Kirwan 2–2, B Power 0–7, K Power 0–3, J Power 0–2, S Clancy 0–1.		D Buckley 1–4, R Grey 1–1, T Ryan 0–4, J Henley 0–1, J Neville 0–1.

19 August 2023 Preliminary quarter-final	Mount Sion	1–25 – 1–13	Lismore	Fraher Field
	A Gleeson 0–7, D Power 1–2, S Roche 0–5, L Flanagan 0–3, M O'Neill 0–2, A Kirwan 0–2, J Gleeson 0–2, MF O'Neill 0–2.		J Prendergast 1–4, M Shanahan 0–4, J Shanahan 0–1, J Prendergast 0–1, O O'Gorman 0–1, B O'Sullivan 0–1, J O'Keeffe 0–1.

20 August 2023 Preliminary quarter-final	Abbeyside	1–18 – 1–15	Dunhill	Fraher Field
	C Treen 0–9, M O'Halloran 0–6, S Callaghan 1–2, M Kiely 0–1.		E Murphy 0–12, C Bonnar 1–0, D Smith 0–2, D Murray 0–1.

20 August 2023 Preliminary quarter-final	Dungarvan	0–23 – 0–18	Passage	Fraher Field
	P Curran 0–12, C Curran 0–4, M Kiely 0–3, C Curran 0–2, J Duggan 0–1, T Loftus 0–1.		O Connors 0–9, L Flynn 0–2, P Walsh 0–2, M Fitzgerald 0–1, C Lynch 0–1, C O'Neill 0–1, E Reilly 0–1, G Cullinane 0–1.

=== Relegation playoffs ===
26 August 2023 Semi-final	Lismore	0–19 – 2–17	Passage	Fraher Field
	M Shanahan 0–9, Jack Prendergast 0–4, J O'Keeffe 0–2, John Prendergast 0–1, J Shanahan 0–1, O O'Gorman 0–1.		L Flynn 0–6, E Reilly 0–4, O Connors 0–4, M Fitzgerald 1–0, C O'Neill 1–0, P Walsh 0–2.

26 August 2023 Semi-final	Tallow	3–19 – 2–18	Dunhill	Páirc Dún Garbháin
	D Buckley 0–8, T Ryan 1–4, I Beecher 1–0, C McCarthy 1–0, R Grey 0–3, M O'Brien 0–1, J Henley 0–1, M Stewart 0–1.		É Murphy 0–15, D Swift 1–2, ??? 1–0, S Kavanagh 0–1.

2 September 2023 Final	Lismore	3–20 – 2–05	Dunhill	Fraher Field
	B O'Sullivan 2–2, M Shanahan 0–8 (5fs, 2 65s), P Prendergast 1–2, O O'Gorman 0–4, Jack Prendergast 0–2, Joseph O'Keeffe, I Daly 0–1 each.	Report	D Murray 2–0, E Murphy 0–2, D Swift, S Casey (f), C Quinn (f) 0–1 each.

=== Quarter-finals ===
26 August 2023 Quarter-final	Ballygunner	0–23 – 1–11	Dungarvan	St Molleran's Grounds
	P Fitzgerald (0-05, 0-04f), K Mahony (0-04); Pauric Mahony (0-04, 0-02f), P Hogan (0-03); C Sheahan (0-03), D Hutchinson (0-03), J Foley (0-01).	Report	P Curran (1-05, 0-03f), J Burke (0-02), T Loftus (0-01); J Duggan (0-01), C Curran (0-01f), M Kiely (0-01).	Referee: M O'Brien (Portlaw)

27 August 2023 Quarter-final	Roanmore	1–18 – 0–17	Mount Sion	SETU Arena
	G O'Brien 0–15, S Mackey 1–0, P O'Sullivan 0–1, C Ryan 0–1, B Nolan 0–1.		A Gleeson 0–8, J Gleeson 0–3, M O'Neill 0–2, S Roche 0–2, A Kirwan 0–2.

27 August 2023 Quarter-final	De La Salle	2–21 – 0–22	Clonea	St Molleran's Grounds
	R Halloran 0–10, J Twomey 1–1, E Meaney 1–1, K Moran 0–3, J Fagan 0–2, T Douglas 0–2, C McCann 0–2.		B Power 0–7, J Gleeson 0–7, S Clancy 0–2, J Power 0–2, K Power 0–2, M Power 0–1, C Kirwan 0–1.

27 August 2023 Quarter-final	Fourmilewater	0–15 – 2–08	Abbeyside	Fraher Field
	D Ryan 0–4, A Ryan 0–4, J Barron 0–3, C Walsh 0–1, S Walsh 0–1, T Guiry 0–1, C Guiry 0–1.		C Treen 0–5, M Kiely 1–0, C Prunty 1–0, S Callaghan 0–2, M Twomey 0–1.

=== Semi-finals ===
2 September 2023 Semi-final	Ballygunner	1–23 – 1–15	Fourmilewater	Fraher Field
	P Mahony 0–9 (6fs, 1 65), D Hutchinson 1–3, P Hogan 0–3, K Mahony, C Sheahan, P Fitzgerald 0–2 each, H Ruddle, J Foley 0–1 each.	Report	A Ryan 0–10 (8fs), T Guiry 1–0, C Gleeson 0–2, F Hallinan, S Walsh, E Spellman 0–1 each.

3 September 2023 Semi-final	Roanmore	0–18 – 0–19	De La Salle	Walsh Park
	G O’Brien (0–9, 7 frees, 1 65); E Flynn (0–3); S Burke (0–2); P O’Sullivan, C Ryan, S Roche, Brian Nolan (0–1 each).	Report	R Halloran (0–10, 8 frees); J Fagan (0–3); T Douglas, E Meaney (0–2 each); K Moran, S Carton (0–1 each).

=== Final ===
10 September 2023 Final	Ballygunner	2–26 – 0–21	De La Salle	Walsh Park
	Pauric Mahony (1–8, 0–6 frees); P Hogan (1–2); K Mahony (0–5); D Hutchinson, C Sheahan (0–3 each); P Fitzgerald, M Mahony (0–2 each); P Leavey (0–1).	Report	R Halloran (0–12, 7 frees, 1 65); T Douglas (0–4); E Barrett (0–3); J Dillon, C Keane (0–1 each).	Referee: N Barry (Passage)

== Championship statistics ==
=== Top scorers ===
Overall

Rank	Player	County	Tally	Total	Matches	Average
1	Reuben Halloran	De La Salle	0–54	54	5	10.80
2	Éamonn Murphy	Dunhill	0–48	48	5	9.60
3	Gavin O'Brien	Roanmore	0–45	45	4	11.25
4	Pauric Mahony	Ballygunner	1–40	43	5	8.60
5	Patrick Curran	Dungarvan	4–29	41	4	10.25
5	Maurice Shanahan	Lismore	0–41	41	5	8.20
7	Jason Gleeson	Clonea	3–21	30	4	7.50
8	Darragh Buckley	Tallow	3–19	28	4	7.00
8	Aaron Ryan	Tallow	1–25	28	4	7.00
10	Billy Power	Clonea	0–27	27	4	6.75

Single game

Rank	Player	Club	Tally	Total	Opposition
1	Patrick Curran	Dungarvan	1–12	15	Dunhill
1	Éamonn Murphy	Dunhill	0–15	15	Tallow
1	Gavin O'Brien	Roanmore	0–15	15	Mount Sion
4	Jason Gleeson	Clonea	2-07	13	Tallow
4	Michael Kiely	Dungarvan	0–13	13	De La Salle
6	Pauric Mahony	Ballygunner	0–12	12	Passage
6	Patrick Curran	Dungarvan	0–12	12	Passage
6	Éamonn Murphy	Dunhill	0–12	12	Abbeyside
6	Reuben Halloran	De La Salle	0–12	12	Dungarvan
6	Reuben Halloran	De La Salle	0–12	12	Ballygunner
