= 2019 Waterford Senior Hurling Championship =

Annual hurling competition season

- Dates: 6 April 2019 – 19 October 2019
- Teams: 12
- Sponsor: J. J. Kavanagh & Sons
- Champions: Ballygunner (18th title); Philip Mahony (captain); Conor Power (captain); Darragh O'Sullivan (manager); David Franks (manager)
- Runners-up: De La Salle; Bryan Phelan (manager)

Tournament statistics
- Matches played: 31
- Goals scored: 89 (2.87 per match)
- Points scored: 1039 (33.52 per match)
- Top scorer(s): Pauric Mahony (0–69)

The 2019 Waterford Senior Hurling Championship is the 119th staging of the Waterford Senior Hurling Championship since its establishment by the Waterford County Board in 1897. The championship began on 6 April 2019 and is scheduled to end on 19 October 2019.

Ballygunner were the defending champions.

On 13 October 2019, Ballygunner won the championship after a 1–24 to 1–15 defeat of De La Salle in the final. It was their 18th championship title overall and their 6th title in succession.

Ballygunner's Pauric Mahony was the championship's top scorer with 0–69.

== Team changes ==
=== To Championship ===
Promoted from the Waterford Intermediate Hurling Championship

- Clonea

=== From Championship ===
Relegated to the Waterford Intermediate Hurling Championship

- An Rinn

== Results/fixtures ==
=== Group A ===
==== Table ====
Team	Pld	W	D	L	PF	PA	PD	Pts
Ballygunner	3	3	0	0	79	52	+27	6
Dungarvan	3	2	0	1	73	53	+20	4
Tallow	3	1	0	2	66	64	+2	2
Clonea	3	0	0	3	46	95	−49	0

==== Group A results ====
6 April 2019 Round 1	Ballygunner	2–26 – 0–18	Clonea	Walsh Park, Waterford
	Pauric Mahony 0–15, P Hogan 1–3, B O'Sullivan 1–0, D Hutchinson 0–2, C Sheehan 0–1, C Power 0–1, JJ Hutchinson 0–1, B O'Keeffe 0–1, Philip Mahony 0–1.		B Power 0–11, J Power 0–3, J Gleeson 0–3, R Cahill 0–1.

7 April 2019 Round 1	Tallow	3–12 – 0–22	Dungarvan	Fraher Field, Dungarvan
	T Ryan 3–6, J Henley 0–3, P O'Brien 0–1, D Buckley 0–1, R Grey 0–1.		P Curran 0–10, G Crotty 0–4, C Curran 0–2, J Nagle 0–2, C Curran 0–1, J Lacey 0–1, K Power 0–1, R Donnelly 0–1.

22 June 2019 Round 2	Clonea	1–14 – 2–19	Tallow	Fraher Field, Dungarvan
	B Power 0–10, R Cahill 1–1, M Power 0–1, M Curry 0–1, J Power 0–1.		K Kearney 2–0, D Buckley 0–6, T Ryan 0–6, I Beecher 0–2, R Beecher 0–2, P O'Brien 0–2, J Henley 0–1.

23 June 2019 Round 2	Ballygunner	1–18 – 0–14	Dungarvan	Walsh Park, Waterford
	Pauric Mahony 0–11, T O'Sullivan 1–0, P Hogan 0–3, JJ Hutchinson 0–3, B O'Sullivan 0–1.		R Donnelly 0–9, C Curran 0–1, S Ryan 0–1, P Curran 0–1, K Power 0–1, M Kiely 0–1.

28 July 2019 Round 3	Dungarvan	2–31 – 1–08	Clonea	Fraher Field, Dungarvan
	R Donnelly 1–11, P Curran 1–6, Colm Curran 0–3, J Allen 0–2, G Crotty 0–2, M Kiely 0–1, K Daly 0–1, S Ryan 0–1, J Nagle 0–1, Cathal Curran 0–1, K Power 0–1, K Moore 0–1.		S Clancy 1–2, B Power 0–3, M Whelan 0–1, J Power 0–1, A Gleeson 0–1.

28 July 2019 Round 3	Ballygunner	2–19 – 1–17	Tallow	Fraher Field, Dungarvan
	Pauric Mahony 0–11, D Hutchinson 2–2, C Sheehan 0–2, C Power 0–1, P Hogan 0–1, S O'Sullivan 0–1, JJ Hutchinson 0–1.		T Ryan 1–4, D Buckley 0–7, I Beecher 0–2, R Grey 0–1, B McCarthy 0–1, T Daly 0–1, P O'Brien 0–1.

=== Group B ===
==== Table ====
Team	Pld	W	D	L	PF	PA	PD	Pts
Abbeyside	3	2	1	0	62	51	+11	5
Mount Sion	3	2	0	1	73	54	+19	4
Roanmore	3	1	1	1	50	57	−7	3
Fourmilewater	3	0	0	3	45	68	−23	0

==== Group B results ====
6 April 2019 Round 1	Roanmore	0–13 – 3–17	Mount Sion	Walsh Park, Waterford
	G O'Brien 0–8, B Nolan 0–2, C Wadding 0–2, S Mackey 0–1.		E McGrath 2–8, A Gleeson 0–4, ME O'Neill 1–0, O Whelan 0–1, A Kirwan 0–1, M Daykin 0–1, M Gaffney 0–1, P Penkert 0–1.

6 April 2019 Round 1	Abbeyside	2–16 – 0–13	Fourmilewater	Fraher Field, Dungarvan
	N Montgomery 2–3, M Ferncombe 0–7, M Twomey 0–2, M Kiely 0–1, D McGrath 0–1, D Collins 0–1, T Murray 0–1.		J Barron 0–8, S Ryan 0–2, K Brazil 0–1, J McGrath 0–1, S Walsh 0–1.

22 June 2019 Round 2	Abbeyside	3–15 – 0–22	Mount Sion	Walsh Park, Waterford
	M Ferncombe 1–9, M Kiely 1–0, S Whelan-Barrett 1–0, N Montgomery 0–3, C Prunty 0–2, M Twomey 0–1.		E McGrath 0–7, A Gleeson 0–4, S Roche 0–3, O Whelan 0–2, J Meaney 0–2, MF O'Neill 0–1, L O'Brien 0–1, C Costelloe 0–1, E Cullen 0–1.

22 June 2019 Round 2	Fourmilewater	2–09 – 1–18	Roanmore	Fraher Field, Dungarvan
	J Barron 1–6, S Walsh 1–1, S Lawlor 0–1, T Barron 0–1.		E O'Toole 1–2, B Nolan 0–5, G O'Brien 0–5, S Mackey 0–2, B Cooke 0–2, D Murphy 0–1, C Wadding 0–1.

28 July 2019 Round 3	Abbeyside	2–10 – 0–16	Roanmore	St. Molleran's Park, Carrickbeg
	M Ferncombe 1–4, S Enright 1–1, M Kiely 0–2, P Hurney 0–1, R Foley 0–1, N Montgomery 0–1.		G O'Brien 0–10, B Nolan 0–2, E O'Toole 0–1, E Madigan 0–1, D Murphy 0–1, S Mackey 0–1.

28 July 2019 Round 3	Mount Sion	2–19 – 2–11	Fourmilewater	Fraher Field, Dungarvan
	E McGrath 1–9, J Kennedy 1–1, S Roche 0–4, I O'Regan 0–1, P Penkert 0–1, E Curran 0–1, C Costello 0–1, M Daykin 0–1.		T Barron 1–3, S Walsh 1–0, S Lawlor 0–2, C Guiry 0–2, K Brazil 0–2, S Ryan 0–1, J Barron 0–1.

=== Group C ===
==== Table ====
Team	Pld	W	D	L	PF	PA	PD	Pts
De La Salle	3	3	0	0	82	49	+33	6
Lismore	3	2	0	1	86	60	+26	4
Passage	3	1	0	2	56	81	−25	2
Ballyduff Upper	3	0	0	3	47	81	−34	0

==== Group C results ====
6 April 2019 Round 1	Ballyduff Upper	2–13 – 2–17	Passage	Fraher Field, Dungarvan
	M Kearney 2–1, E Murray 0–5, S Casey 0–3, F Murray 0–1, K Casey 0–1, A Casey 0–1, S Hannon 0–1.		K Fitzgerald 0–6, L Flynn 1–2, E Reilly 1–0, A Roche 0–3, S Hogan 0–2, S Lynch 0–1, J Burke 0–1, O Connors 0–1, M Hutchinson 0–1.

7 April 2019 Round 1	De La Salle	2–21 – 1–18	Lismore	Fraher Field, Dungarvan
	J Fagan 0–11, C McCann 1–0, E Meaney 1–0, J Dillon 0–3, S Ryan 0–3, E Barrett 0–2, A Farrell 0–1, P Nevin 0–1.		M Shanahan 0–12, R Barry 1–1, P Prendergast 0–2, O O'Gorman 0–1, F Reaney 0–1, J Prendergast 0–1.

20 June 2019 Round 2	Lismore	1–21 – 0–15	Ballyduff Upper	Cappoquin Sportsfield, Cappoquin
	M Shanahan 0–12, J Shanahan 1–1, F Reaney 0–2, P Prendergast 0–2, O O'Gorman 0–1, I Daly 0–1, S Barry 0–1, J Prendergast 0–1.		E Murray 0–11, A Casey 0–2, K Casey 0–1, F Murray 0–1.

23 June 2019 Round 2	De La Salle	2–15 – 1–12	Passage	Walsh Park, Waterford
	J Fagan 0–9, S Flynn 1–2, E Meaney 1–0, J Dillon 0–1, S McNulty 0–1, A Farrell 0–1, D Twomey 0–1.		K Fitzgerald 0–10, R Hurley 1–0, N O'Keeffe 0–2.

26 July 2019 Round 3	De La Salle	3–25 – 0–13	Ballyduff Upper	Fraher Field, Dungarvan
	J Fagan 2–8, C McCann 1–4, E Barrett 0–3, P Nevin 0–3, A Farrell 0–2, J Dillon 0–2, D Twomey 0–1, S McNulty 0–1, S O'Brien 0–1.		E Murray 0–9, M Kearney 0–4.

28 July 2019 Round 3	Passage	1–15 – 5–26	Lismore	Fraher Field, Dungarvan
	K Fitzgerald 0–8, T Connors 1–2, O Connors 0–3, E O'Reilly 0–1, P Walsh 0–1.		M Shanahan 2–11, P Prendergast 2–4, R Barry 0–6, S Barry 0–3, D Shanahan 1–0, J Shanahan 0–1, O O'Gorman 0–1.

=== Knock-out stage ===
==== Play-offs ====
24 August 2019 Play-off	Roanmore	2–15 – 2–13	Ballyduff Upper	Fraher Field, Dungarvan
	G O'Brien 0–9, E O'Toole 1–1, B Nolan 0–4, E Madigan 1–0, R Connolly 0–1.		E Murray 1–8, S Kearney 1–0, C Murray 0–2, A Casey 0–1, F Murray 0–1, E O'Brien 0–1.	Referee: T Walsh

24 August 2019 Play-off	Tallow	0–15 – 2–19	Passage	Fraher Field, Dungarvan
	D Buckley 0–10, R Grey 0–3, T Ryan 0–1, K Geary 0–1.		K Fitzgerald 0–8, O Connors 1–3, T Connors 1–2, P Walsh 0–2, G Cullinane 0–2, J Roche 0–1, D Lynch 0–1.	Referee: M O'Brien

25 August 2019 Play-off	Mount Sion	1–20 – 0–17	Clonea	Walsh Park, Waterford
	A Gleeson 0–8, E McGrath 0–6, J Meaney 1–1, M Gaffney 0–2, MF O'Neill 0–1, PJ Fanning 0–1, C Costello 0–1.		B Power 0–7, J Gleeson 0–5, R Flynn 0–2, J Power 0–1, S Clancy 0–1, C Power 0–1.	Referee: T Mansfield (Cappoquin)

25 August 2019 Play-off	Dungarvan	1–26 – 2–13	Fourmilewater	Fraher Field, Dungarvan
	R Donnelly 0–15, P Curran 1–2, G Crotty 0–3, J Allen 0–2, C Curran 0–2, C Sheridan 0–1, M Kiely 0–1.		T Barron 1–7, S Ryan 1–3, S Lawlor 0–1, R Fenton 0–1, S Walsh 0–1.	Referee: A Kissane (Dunhill)

==== Relegation play-offs ====
31 August 2019 Semi-final	Clonea	3–22 – 1–15	Fourmilewater	Fraher Field, Dungarvan
	B Power 0–8, J Power 2–0, S Clancy 0–5, M Curry 1–0, C power 0–3, J Gleeson 0–3, R Flynn 0–2, M Whelan 0–1.		D Guiry 1–5, T Barron 0–4, S Walsh 0–3, R Fenton 0–3.	Referee: P Smith (Shamrocks)

31 August 2019 Semi-final	Ballyduff Upper	0–17 – 1–16	Tallow	Fraher Field, Dungarvan
	F Murray 0–8, M Kearney 0–3, A Casey 0–3, S Molumphy 0–1, K Casey 0–1, C Murray 0–1.		D Buckley 0–8, P O'Brien 1–1, R Grey 0–3, I Beecher 0–2, K Geary 0–1, T Ryan 0–1.	Referee: N Barry (Passage)

29 September 2019 Final	Ballyduff Upper	0–15 – 1–12	Fourmilewater	Fraher Field, Dungarvan
				Referee: N Barry

19 October 2019 Final replay	Ballyduff Upper	0–09 – 0–15	Fourmilewater	Fraher Field, Dungarvan
				Referee: Michael O' Brien

==== Quarter-finals ====
31 August 2019 Quarter-final	Ballygunner	3–22 – 1–12	Passage	Fraher Field, Dungarvan
	Pauric Mahony 0–11, P Hogan 2–0, D Hutchinson 0–6, M Mahony 1–1, B O'Sullivan 0–1, T O'Sullivan 0–1, C Sheehan 0–1, P Leavey 0–1.		O Connors 1–1, P Fitzgerald 0–4, G Cullinane 0–2, P Walsh 0–2, L Flynn 0–1, S Lynch 0–1, A Roche 0–1.	Referee: T Walsh (Modeligo)

1 September 2019 Quarter-final	De La Salle	2–15 – 2–09	Roanmore	Fraher Field, Dungarvan
	E Meaney 2–0, J Fagan 0–6, E Barrett 0–4, S Ryan 0–2, S McNulty 0–1, C McCann 0–1, K Moran 0–1.		B Nolan 0–5, E Madigan 1–0, B Cooke 1–0, D Murphy 0–2, G O'Brien 0–1, E O'Toole 0–1.	Referee: T Walsh (Modeligo)

1 September 2019 Quarter-final	Lismore	1–15 – 2–22	Mount Sion	Fraher Field, Dungarvan
	M Shanahan 0–9, P Prendergast 1–2, S Barry 0–2, S Heaphy 0–1, J Prendergast 0–1.		E McGrath 0–12, MF O'Neill 2–0, A Gleeson 0–4, E Curran 0–2, L O'Brien 0–1, S Roche 0–1, A Kirwan 0–1, J Meaney 0–1.	Referee: A Kissane

1 September 2019 Quarter-final	Abbeyside	3–12 – 2–17	Dungarvan	Fraher Field, Dungarvan
	M Kiely 2–4, M Ferncombe 1–3, N Montgomery 0–2, S Enright 0–1, N Prunty 0–1, M Twomey 0–1.		R Donnelly 0–7, M Kiely 1–2, G Crotty 0–4, J Allen 1–0, P Curran 0–2, K Moore 0–1, J Nagle 0–1.	Referee: N O'Toole

==== Semi-finals ====
29 September 2019 Semi-final	Mount Sion	1–16 – 1–20	De La Salle	Walsh Park, Waterford
	E McGrath (4 frees), A Gleeson (1 free)(0–5 each) J Meaney (1–2); S Roche (0–2); M Gaffney, M O’Neill (0–1 each).	Report	T Douglas (1–3), J Fagan (6 frees)(0–6); S McNulty (2 frees, 1 65) J Dillon (0–3 each); D Twomey (0–2 each); C McCann, A Farrell, K Moran (0–1 each).	Referee: T Walsh (Modeligo)

29 September 2019 Semi-final	Ballygunner	2–22 – 1–13	Dungarvan	Fraher Field, Dungarvan
	Pauric Mahony (0–9, 6 frees); P Hogan, M Mahony (1–2 each); D Hutchinson (0–4); C Sheahan (0–2); B O’Sullivan, JJ Hutchinson, B O’Keeffe (0–1).	Report	R Donnelly (0–5, 4 frees); P Curran (1–1); Cathal Curran (0–3); J Allen, Colm Curran, G Crotty, M Kiely (0–1).	Referee: N Barry (Passage)

==== Final ====
13 October 2019 Final	De La Salle	1–15 – 1–24	Ballygunner	Walsh Park, Waterford
	E Meaney 1–3, J Fagan, C McCann, J Dillon 0–3 each, S McNulty (65), A Farrell, E Meaney 0–1 each.	Report	P Mahony 0–12 (0-6f), D Hutchinson 1–3, P Hogan 0–3, C Sheahan 0–2, B O’Sullivan, T O’Sullivan, P Leavy, C Power 0–1 each.	Referee: M O'Brien

== Championship statistics ==
=== Top scorers ===
Top scorers overall

Rank	Player	Club	Tally	Total	Matches	Average
1	Pauric Mahony	Ballygunner	0–69	69	6	11.50
2	Evan McGrath	Mount Sion	3–47	56	6	9.33
3	Ryan Donnelly	Dungarvan	1–48	51	6	8.50
4	Maurice Shanahan	Lismore	2–44	50	4	12.50
5	Jack Fagan	De La Salle	2–43	49	6	8.16
6	Mark Ferncombe	Abbeyside	3–23	42	4	10.50
7	Billy Power	Clonea	0–39	39	5	7.80
8	Eoghan Murray	Ballyduff Upper	1–33	36	4	8.00
8	Killian Fitzgerald	Passage	0–36	36	5	7.20
9	Gavin O'Brien	Roanmore	0–33	33	5	6.60

Top scorers in a single game

Rank	Player	Club	Tally	Total	Opposition
1	Maurice Shanahan	Lismore	2–11	17	Passage
2	Thomas Ryan	Tallow	3-06	15	Dungarvan
2	Ryan Donnelly	Dungarvan	0–15	15	The Nire-Fourmilewater
2	Pauric Mahony	Ballygunner	0–15	15	Clonea
3	Evan McGrath	Mount Sion	2-08	14	Roanmore
3	Jack Fagan	De La Salle	2-08	14	Ballyduff Upper
3	Ryan Donnelly	Dungarvan	1–11	14	Clonea
4	Mark Ferncombe	Abbeyside	1-09	12	Mount Sion
4	Evan McGrath	Mount Sion	1-09	12	Fourmilewater
4	Maurice Shanahan	Lismore	0–12	12	Ballyduff Upper
4	Maurice Shanahan	Lismore	0–12	12	De La Salle
4	Evan McGrath	Mount Sion	0–12	12	Lismore
4	Pauric Mahony	Ballygunner	0–12	12	De La Salle

=== Miscellaneous ===
- On 28 July 2019, Ballygunner recorded their 30th consecutive championship victory.
