= 2017 Waterford Intermediate Hurling Championship =

Annual hurling competition season

- Dates: 28 October 2017
- Teams: 2
- Sponsor: JJ Kavanagh and Sons
- Champions: An Rinn (3rd title); Ray Ó Ceallaigh (captain); Donie Breathnach (captain)
- Runners-up: Clonea

Tournament statistics
- Matches played: 1
- Goals scored: 0 (0 per match)
- Points scored: 31 (31 per match)
- Top scorer(s): Donie Breathnach (0-14)

The 2017 Waterford Intermediate Hurling Championship was the 54th staging of the Waterford Intermediate Hurling Championship since its establishment by the Waterford County Board in 1964.

The final was played on 28 October 2017 at Walsh Park in Waterford, between An Rinn and Clonea, in what was their first ever meeting in the final. An Rinn won the match by 0–18 to 0–13 to claim their third championship title overall and a first title in five years.

An Rinn's Donie Breathnach was the top scorer with 0–14.

== Qualification ==
Division	Champions
Eastern Intermediate Hurling Championship	Clonea
Western Intermediate Hurling Championship	An Rinn

== Final ==
28 October 2017 Final	An Rinn	0-18 - 0-13	Clonea	Walsh Park
	D Breathnach 0-14, L Ó Lonáin 0-2, C Breathnach 0-1, A Mac Gearailt 0-1.		B Power 0-9, J Gleeson 0-3, M Scurry 0-1.	Referee: N O'Toole

== Top scorers ==
Overall

Rank	Player	Club	Tally	Total
1	Donie Breathnach	An Rinn	0-14	14
2	Billy Power	Clonea	0-09	9
3	Jason Gleeson	Clonea	0-03	3
