= 2016 Waterford Intermediate Hurling Championship =

Annual hurling competition season

- Dates: 28 October 2016
- Teams: 2
- Sponsor: JJ Kavanagh and Sons
- Champions: Lismore (2nd title); Paudie Prendergast (captain)
- Runners-up: Dunhill; Jeff Lawless (captain)

Tournament statistics
- Matches played: 1
- Goals scored: 6 (6 per match)
- Points scored: 23 (23 per match)

The 2016 Waterford Intermediate Hurling Championship was the 53rd staging of the Waterford Intermediate Hurling Championship since its establishment by the Waterford County Board in 1964.

The final was played on 28 October 2016 at Fraher Field in Dungarvan, between Lismore and Dunhill, in what was their first ever meeting in the final. Lismore won the match by 5–19 to 1–04 to claim their second championship title overall and a first title in 47 years.

== Qualification ==
Division	Champions
Eastern Intermediate Hurling Championship	Dunhill
Western Intermediate Hurling Championship	Lismore

== Final ==
28 October 2016 Final	Lismore	5-19 - 1-04	Dunhill	Walsh Park
	M Shanahan 2-8, J Prendergast 1-5, D Shanahan 2-1, P O'Keeffe 0-3, B Landers 0-2.		S Casey 1-2, D Phelan 0-2.	Referee: P Casey (Cappoquin)

== Top scorers ==
Overall

Rank	Player	Club	Tally	Total
1	Maurice Shanahan	Lismore	2-08	14
2	Jack Prendergast	Lismore	1-05	8
3	Dan Shanahan	Lismore	2-01	7
