= 2020 Waterford Intermediate Hurling Championship =

Annual hurling competition season

- Dates: 30 August 2020
- Teams: 2
- Sponsor: JJ Kavanagh and Sons
- Champions: Ballyduff Upper (4th title); Kevin Casey (captain); Andrew Casey (captain)
- Runners-up: Ballyduff Lower; Calum Lyons (captain)

Tournament statistics
- Matches played: 1
- Goals scored: 3 (3 per match)
- Points scored: 55 (55 per match)
- Top scorer(s): Mikey Kearney (0-19)

The 2020 Waterford Intermediate Hurling Championship was the 57th staging of the Waterford Intermediate Hurling Championship since its establishment by the Waterford County Board in 1964.

The final was played on 30 August 2020 at Fraher Field in Dungarvan, between Ballyduff Upper and Ballyduff Lower, in what was their second meeting in the final overall and a first final meeting in 56 years. Ballyduff Upper won the match by 1–32 to 2–23 to claim their fourth championship title overall and a first title in 15 years.

Ballyduff Upper's Mikey Kearney was the top scorer with 0–19.

== Qualification ==
| Division | Champions |
|---|---|
| Eastern Intermediate Hurling Championship | Ballyduff Lower |
| Western Intermediate Hurling Championship | Ballyduff Upper |

== Final ==
| 30 August 2020 Final | Ballyduff Upper | 1-32 - 2-23 | Ballyduff Lower | Fraher Field |
| | M Kearney (0-19, 9f, 1’65’), A Casey (0-5), E Murray (1-1), F Murray, C Murray (0-2 each), K Casey, Sean Hickey and Sean Casey 0-1 each. | | J Lyons (0-8, 2f), C Lyons (0-7, 2f, 1’sl’), J Kennedy (1-2), N Clifford (1-1), R Dunphy (0-4), D Cheasty (0-1). | Referee: N O'Toole (Naomh Pól) |

== Top scorers ==
Overall

| Rank | Player | Club | Tally | Total |
|---|---|---|---|---|
| 1 | Mikey Kearney | Ballyduff Upper | 0-19 | 19 |
| 2 | Jack Lyons | Ballyduff Lower | 0-08 | 8 |
| 3 | Calum Lyons | Ballyduff Lower | 0-07 | 7 |
