= Jimmy Galvin =

Irish hurler

James Galvin was an Irish hurler. At club level he played for Clonea, winning a Waterford Senior Championship title in 1952, and was a substitute on the Waterford senior hurling team that won the 1948 All-Ireland Championship. Galvin's brother, Billy, was also a member of the team while his nephew, John Galvin, also played for Waterford.
