= 2018 Waterford Intermediate Hurling Championship =

Annual hurling competition season

- Dates: 14 October 2018
- Teams: 2
- Sponsor: JJ Kavanagh and Sons
- Champions: Clonea (4th title); Robbie Flynn (captain)
- Runners-up: Clashmore–Kinsalebeg; Brian O'Halloran (captain)

Tournament statistics
- Matches played: 1
- Goals scored: 3 (3 per match)
- Points scored: 25 (25 per match)
- Top scorer(s): Billy Power (0-07)

The 2018 Waterford Intermediate Hurling Championship was the 55th staging of the Waterford Intermediate Hurling Championship since its establishment by the Waterford County Board in 1964.

The final was played on 14 October 2018 at Fraher Field in Dungarvan, between Clonea and Clashmore–Kinsalebeg, in what was their first ever meeting in the final. Clonea won the match by 2–13 to 1–12 to claim their first ever championship title.

Clonea's Billy Power was the top scorer with 0-07.

== Qualification ==
Division	Champions
Eastern Intermediate Hurling Championship	Clonea
Western Intermediate Hurling Championship	Clashmore–Kinsalebeg

== Final ==
14 October 2018 Final	Clonea	2-13 - 1-12	Clashmore–Kinsalebeg	Fraher Field
	B Power 0-7, C Power 1-3, R Cahill 1-0, M Curry 0-2, R Power 0-1.		B Ramsey 1-2, E O'Halloran 0-5, T de Búrca 0-2, P O'Connor 0-1, A Trihy 0-1, B O'Halloran 0-1.	Referee: N O'Toole

== Top scorers ==
Overall

Rank	Player	Club	Tally	Total
1	Billy Power	Clonea	0-07	7
2	Ciarán Power	Clonea	1-03	6
3	Brian Ramsey	Clashmore–Kinsalebeg	1-02	5
3	Edmond O'Halloran	Clashmore–Kinsalebeg	0-05	5
