= Eastern Intermediate Hurling Championship =

Annual hurling competition for intermediate clubs in East Waterford

- Irish: Craobhchomórtas Idirmheánach Iomáint Oirthear Phort Láirge
- Code: Hurling
- Founded: 1964; 62 years ago
- Region: Waterford (GAA)
- No. of teams: 6
- Title holders: Roanmore (3rd title)
- First winner: Ballyduff Lower
- Sponsors: Gerry Kennedy Crash Repairs
- Official website: Waterford GAA

The Eastern Intermediate Hurling Championship (known for sponsorship reasons as the Gerry Kennedy Crash Repairs Eastern Hurling Championship and abbreviated to the Eastern IHC) is an annual hurling competition organised by the eastern divisional section of the Waterford County Board of the Gaelic Athletic Association since 1964 and contested by intermediate team in the county of Waterford in Ireland.

In its current format, the Eastern Intermediate Hurling Championship begins with a group stage. The six participating teams play each other in a round-robin system. The two top-ranking teams proceed to the final match at Walsh Park. The winner of the Eastern IHC subsequently represent the division in the Waterford IHC.

Roanmore are the title holders after defeating St Molleran's by 3–14to 0–18 in the 2026 final.

== History ==
The Eastern Intermediate Championship was established in 1964 in an effort to bridge the standard of play between the Waterford SHC and the divisional junior championships. Ballyduff Lower were the first championship winners.

On 31 January 2022, Waterford County Board delegates voted on the restructuring of the entire intermediate hurling championship system following a review process. It was decided to establish an all-county eight-team Waterford Premier Intermediate Championship for 2023. These eight teams were made up of the four semi-finalists from the 2022 Eastern and Western intermediate championships.

== Format ==
=== Group stage ===
Six clubs start in the group stage. Over the course of the group stage, each team plays once against the others in the group, resulting in each team being guaranteed five group games. Two points are awarded for a win, one for a draw and zero for a loss. The teams are ranked in the group stage table by points gained, then scoring difference and then their head-to-head record. The top four teams qualify for the knockout stage

=== Final ===
The top two teams from the group stage contest the final. The winning team are declared champions.

=== Relegation ===
The fifth and sixth-placed teams from the group stage take part in a relegation playoff to determine who drops to the Eastern Junior A Hurling Championship.

== Teams ==
=== 2026 teams ===
The following 6 teams contested the 2024 Eastern Intermediate Hurling Championship:

Team	Location	Championship titles (since 1995)	Last championship title
Butlerstown	Waterford	0	—
Dunhill	Dunhill	6	2021
Erins Own	Waterford	2	2003
Micheal MacCraith	Tramore	0	—
Roanmore B	Waterford	3	2026
St Molleran's	Carrick-Beg	2	2008

== Qualification for subsequent competitions ==
From its inception in 1964, the Eastern IHC champions automatically qualify for the Waterford IHC. Here they play the Western IHC winners to determine the county champions. This format was abandoned for a period in the late 1970s and early 1980s when a county-wide Waterford IHC was in operation, however, it was later reinstated.

== Roll of honour ==
=== Roll of honour (1995–present) ===
#	Club	Titles	Championships won
1	Dunhill	6	1999, 2001, 2011, 2013, 2016, 2021
2	Clonea	5	2002, 2006, 2009, 2017, 2018
2	Portlaw	5	2004, 2012, 2015, 2023, 2024
4	Ballyduff Lower	3	1998, 2000, 2020
4	Roanmore	3	2010, 2025, 2026
6	Erin's Own	2	1997, 2003
6	Passage	2	2005, 2007
6	St Molleran's	2	1995, 2008
6	Ballygunner	2	2019, 2022
10	Ferrybank	1	1996
10	St Saviour's	1	2014

== List of finals ==
=== List of finals (1995–present) ===
Year	Winners		Runners-up		#
Year	Club	Score	Club	Score	#
2026	Roanmore	3-14	St Molleran's	0-18	
2025	Roanmore	3-19	St Molleran's	3-12	
2024	Portlaw	3-21	St Molleran's	0-13	
2023	Portlaw	3-22	Erin's Own	3–11	
2022	Ballygunner	1–18	Ballyduff Lower	1–12	
2021	Dunhill	0–17	Ferrybank	1-08	
2020	Ballyduff Lower	2–18	Dunhill	1-20	
2019	Ballygunner	3-21	Dunhill	1-09	
2018	Clonea	0-22	Dunhill	0–19	
2017	Clonea	3–15	Erin's Own	0–11	
2016	Dunhill	2–15	Erin's Own	0–13	
2015	Portlaw	3–15	Clonea	2–15	
2014	St Saviour's	1–19	Ballygunner	2–12	
2013	Dunhill	1–12	Portlaw	0-07	
2012	Portlaw	1–19	Clonea	3-09	
2011	Dunhill	2–12	Portlaw	0–17	
2010	Roanmore	1–14	Clonea	0–13	
2009	Clonea	2–12	Mount Sion	2-07	
2008	St Molleran's	0–13	St Saviour's	1-08	
2007	Passage	0-09	Portlaw	0-08	
2006	Clonea	1–11	Portlaw	0–12	
2005	Passage	3–15	Clonea	1-08	
2004	Portlaw	3-08	Clonea	2-09	
2003	Erin's Own	3–14	Dunhill	3-06	
2002	Clonea	1–10	Dunhill	0–11	
2001	Dunhill	1-09	Ballydurn	1-03	
2000	Ballyduff Lower	5-06	Ballydurn	1-08	
1999	Dunhill	0–10	Ferrybank	1-04	
1998	Ballyduff Lower	4–16	St Saviour's	1–11	
1997	Erin's Own	2–12	Ferrybank	1–12	
1996	Ferrybank	2–11	Mount Sion	1-07	
1995	St Molleran's	1–10	Kill	1-09	

=== Notes ===
- 1995 - The first match ended in a draw: St Molleran's 2–12, Kill 3-09.
- 1997 - The first match ended in a draw: Erin's Own 1–12, Ferrybank 1–12.
- 2008 - The first match ended in a draw: St Molleran's 0–13, St Saviour's 1–10.

== See also ==
- Waterford Intermediate Hurling Championship
  - Western Intermediate Hurling Championship
