= 2024 Waterford Intermediate Hurling Championship =

Annual hurling competition season

- Dates: 24 August 2024
- Teams: 2
- Sponsor: JJ Kavanagh and Sons
- Champions: Portlaw (3rd title); D. J. Foran (captain); Darren Rockett (captain); Peter Queally (manager)
- Runners-up: Ballyduff Upper

Tournament statistics
- Matches played: 1
- Goals scored: 7 (7 per match)
- Points scored: 30 (30 per match)
- Top scorer(s): Evan Burrows (0-13)

The 2024 Waterford Intermediate Hurling Championship was the 61st staging of the Waterford Intermediate Hurling Championship since its establishment by the Waterford County Board in 1964.

The final was played on 24 August 2024 at Fraher Field in Dungarvan, between Portlaw and Ballyduff Upper, in what was their first ever meeting in the final. Portlaw won the match by 5–17 to 2–13 to claim their third championship title overall and a first title in nine years.

== Qualification ==
| Division | Champions |
|---|---|
| Eastern Intermediate Hurling Championship | Portlaw |
| Western Intermediate Hurling Championship | Ballyduff Upper |

== Final ==
| 24 August 2024 Final | Ballyduff Upper | 2-13 - 5-17 | Portlaw | Fraher Field |
| | | Report |
