= Mark Fitzgerald (hurler) =

Irish hurler (born 2002)

Personal information
- Native name: Marc Mac Giolla Pádraig (Irish)
- Born: 2002 (age 23–24) Passage East; County Waterford, Ireland
- Occupation: Student

Sport
- Sport: Hurling
- Position: Full-back
Club
- Years: Club
- 2020-present: Passage
Club titles
- Waterford titles: 0
College
- Years: College
- 2021-present: University of Limerick
College titles
- Fitzgibbon titles: 3
Inter-county
- Years: County
- 2022-present: Waterford
Inter-county titles
- Munster titles: 0
- All-Irelands: 0
- NHL: 1
- All Stars: 0

Mark Fitzgerald (born 2002) is an Irish hurler. At club level, he plays with Passage and at inter-county level with the Waterford senior hurling team.

== Career ==
Fitzgerald attended De La Salle College in Waterford and played all grades of hurling during his time there, including in the Dr Harty Cup. He later studied at University of Limerick and was part of their Fitzgibbon Cup-winning teams in 2023, 2025 and 2026. At club level, Fitzgerald played with Passage.

At inter-county level, Fitzgerald first played for Waterford as part of the minor team in 2019. He later progressed to the under-20 team but ended his underage career without silverware. Fitzgerald made his senior team debut during Waterford's successful National Hurling League campaign in 2022. He claimed a Division 1B medal in 2025. Fitzgerald captained Waterford in the absence of Conor Prunty in 2026.

== Honours ==
University of Limerick

- Fitzgibbon Cup (3): 2023, 2025, 2026

Waterford

- National Hurling League Division 1 (1): 2022
- National Hurling League Division 1B (1): 2025
