= 2009 Waterford county hurling team season =

2009 Waterford hurling season
2009 hurling season
Manager	Davy Fitzgerald
- All-Ireland SHC
- Munster SHC
National League	5th
- Top scorer
- Highest SHC attendance
Lowest SHC attendance	15,334
Standard colours

The 2009 season was the Waterford county hurling team's 122nd consecutive season appearing in the All-Ireland Senior Hurling Championship, and their 78th season appearing in the National Hurling League. Waterford's season commenced on 4 January 2009 beating University College Cork by a point in the Waterford Crystal Cup.

== Waterford Crystal Cup ==
Waterford got drawn against UCC in the first round of the 2009 Waterford Crystal Cup. After a close game, Waterford triumphed by the closest of margins. Waterford progressed to play Tipperary in the quarter-final. In a poor game, Tipperary triumphed over an experimental Waterford side on a scoreline of Tipperary 0-14 - 1-09 Waterford.

=== Round 1 ===
4 January 2009
Round 1

UCC	1-17 - 2-13	Waterford
D. Browne 0-8; S. Moylan 1-2; A. Nash 1-0; J. Mulhall 0-2; S. Burke 0-1	(Report)	J. Nagle 0-6; G. Hurney 1-1; T. Ryan 0-3; P. Hurney 0-3; J. Kennedy 0-2; J. Hurney 0-1; S. Walsh 0-1

Walsh Park, Waterford
Referee: T Ryan (Tipperary)

=== Quarter-final ===
14 January 2009
Quarter-final

Tipperary	0-14 - 1-09	Waterford
D. Egan 0-4; P. Kelly 0-3; S. Hennessy 0-3; W. Ryan 0-2; J. Woodlock 0-1; H. Maloney 0-1	(Report)	J. Kennedy 1-0; J. Nagle 0-3; T. Ryan 0-2; S. Casey 0-2; P. Hurney 0-1; G. Hurney 0-1

Carrickbeg, County Waterford
Referee: T Ryan (Tipperary)

== National Hurling League ==
Unlike in 2008, when the National Hurling League was composed of two groups of 6 teams, the 2009 took the shape of a single group with 8 teams, with each team playing all other teams once. Waterford began their league campaign with an away fixture against Tipperary on 14 February 2009. Waterford had a disappointing league, winning three of seven games and losing the remaining four, leaving them finishing fifth in the table. The highlight of the league came with a win over reigning All-Ireland Hurling Champions, Kilkenny by four points. Kilkenny would later go on to beat Tipperary in the league final.

While the results may have been disappointing, a lot of new players were blooded throughout the league. The likes of Noel Connors, Maurice Shanahan, Shane Casey and brothers John and Podge Hurney got their first taste of competitive inter-county action. Further experimentation took place with Ken McGrath being played at centre-forward and Michael Walsh being played at centre-back throughout the league. Declan Prendergast notably got a 2-month ban after a strike to the face of Eddie Brennan during the league game against Kilkenny.

=== Final standings ===
P	Team	Pld	W	D	L	PF	PA	PD	Pts
1	Kilkenny	7	6	0	1	178	111	+67	12
2	Tipperary	7	6	0	1	143	127	+16	12
3	Galway	7	4	0	3	142	136	+6	8
4	Dublin	7	3	1	3	142	126	+16	7
5	Waterford	7	3	0	4	134	134	0	6
6	Limerick	7	3	0	4	121	124	-3	6
7	Cork	7	2	0	5	118	179	-61	4
8	Clare	7	0	1	6	112	153	-41	1

Qualification
Qualified for final
Relegated to division 2

=== Matches ===
8 February 2009
Round 1

Waterford	1-12 - 2-13	Tipperary
S. Prendergast 0-5; C. Hennessy 1-0; S. Molumphy 0-2; D. Shanahan 0-1; J. Nagle 0-1; J. Kennedy 0-1; P. Hurney 0-1; M. Shanahan 0-1	(Report)	P. Kerwick 1-1; P. Kelly 1-1; W. Ryan 0-4; J. Woodlock 0-2; J. Devane 0-2; P. Maher 0-1; C. O'Mahony 0-1; B. Dunne 0-1

Walsh Park, Waterford
Referee: B. Kelly (Westmeath)

15 February 2009
Round 2

Clare	0-13 - 0-20	Waterford
N. Gilligan 0-5; C. Ryan 0-3; B. Nugent 0-3; C. Morey 0-1; J. McInerney 0-1	(Report)	S. Prendergast 0-5; K. McGrath 0-4; E. Kelly 0-4; S. Walsh 0-2; G. Hurney 0-2; D. Shanahan 0-1; R. Foley 0-1; J. Nagle 0-1

Cusack Park, Ennis
Referee: D. Murphy (Wexford)

1 March 2009
Round 3

Waterford	2-17 - 1-16	Kilkenny
K. McGrath 0-9; D. Shanahan 1-1; S. Prendergast 0-4; S. Molumphy 1-0; E. Kelly 0-1; J. Nagle 0-1; S. Walsh 0-1	(Report)	R. Power 1-7; J. Tennyson 0-2; E. Brennan 0-2; M. Rice 0-1; E. Larkin 0-1; M. Grace 0-1; A. Fogarty 0-1; J. Ryall 0-1

Walsh Park, Waterford
Referee: A. Stapleton (Laois)

22 March 2009
Round 4

Dublin	0-15 - 1-11	Waterford
A. McCrabbe 0-9; S. Durcan 0-2; D. O'Callaghan 0-1; J. McCaffery 0-1; J. Boland 0-1; K. Flynn 0-1	(Report)	E. Kelly 0-8; S. Molumphy 1-0; G. Hurney 0-2; K. McGrath 0-1

Parnell Park, Dublin
Referee: D. Murphy (Wexford)

29 March 2009
Round 5

Waterford	2-12 - 1-21	Galway
E. Kelly 2-7; R. Foley 0-2; S. O'Sullivan 0-2; S. Prendergast 0-1	(Report)	J. Canning 0-9; C. Donnellan 1-2; N. Healy 0-3; A. Callanan 0-2; D. Tierney 0-2; A. Smith 0-2; N. Hayes 0-1

Fraher Field, Dungarvan
Referee: D. Kirwan (Cork)

5 April 2009
Round 6

Limerick	2-14 - 1-13	Waterford
N. Moran 1-9; D. Ryan 1-0; J. Ryan 0-1; S. Hickey 0-1; D. Sheehan 0-1; G. O'Mahony 0-1; J. O'Brien 0-1	(Report)	E. Kelly 1-4; J. Mullane 0-3; G. Hurney 0-2; S. Walsh 0-1; R. Foley 0-1; D. Shanahan 0-1; E. McGrath 0-1

Gaelic Grounds, Limerick
Referee: C. McAllister (Cork)

19 April 2009
Round 7

Cork	3-15 - 2-22	Waterford
B. Johnson 1-1; P. O'Sullivan 1-0; S. O'Neill 1-0; J. O'Connor 0-3; P. Horgan 0-3; T. Kenny 0-2; P. Cronin 0-2; C. Naughton 0-2; F. O'Leary 0-1; J. Gardiner 0-1	(Report)	G. Hurney 2-2; E. Kelly 0-7; J. Nagle 0-4; S. Prendergast 0-3; J. Mullane 0-3; S. Molumphy 0-2; E. McGrath 0-1

Páirc Uí Chaoimh, Cork
Referee: J. Owens (Wexford)

== All-Ireland Senior Hurling Championship ==
=== Munster Championship ===
Quarter-finals
Tipperary	1-19
Cork	0-19

Semi-finals
Tipperary	3-18
Clare	1-22
Limerick	0-17
Waterford	0-25

Munster Final
Tipperary	*-**
Waterford	*-**

14 June 2009
Munster Semi-final

Limerick	1-08 - 0-11	Waterford
N Moran 0-4; D Breen 1-0; J Ryan 0-2; S Hickey 0-1; A O'Shaughnessy 0-1	(Report)	E Kelly 0-6; J Mullane 0-4; S Prendergast 0-1

Semple Stadium, Thurles
Referee: D. Kirwan (Cork)

20 June 2009
Munster Semi-final replay

Limerick	0-17 - 0-25	Waterford
A. O'Shaughnessy 0-5; N. Moran 0-5; J. Ryan 0-2; S. Hickey 0-2; D. O'Grady 0-1; P. Browne 0-1; D. Breen 0-1	(Report)	E. Kelly 0-12; J. Mullane 0-7; S. Prendergast 0-4; S. O'Sullivan 0-1; S. Molumphy 0-1

Semple Stadium, Thurles
Referee: Brian Gavin (Offaly)
