= Ballyduff GAA =

Ballyduff GAA may refer to:

== Sport clubs ==
- Ballyduff Upper GAA, in Ballyduff Upper, County Waterford, Ireland
- Ballyduff Lower GAA, in Ballyduff Lower, County Waterford, Ireland
- Ballyduff GAA (Kerry), in Ballyduff, County Kerry, Ireland
