= 2023 Waterford Intermediate Hurling Championship =

Annual hurling competition season

- Dates: 9 September 2023
- Teams: 2
- Sponsor: JJ Kavanagh and Sons
- Champions: Brickey Rangers (1st title); Oran Keevers (captain)
- Runners-up: Portlaw; Darren Rockett (captain)

Tournament statistics
- Matches played: 1
- Goals scored: 1 (1 per match)
- Points scored: 37 (37 per match)
- Top scorer(s): Tom O'Connell (0-11)

The 2023 Waterford Intermediate Hurling Championship was the 60th staging of the Waterford Intermediate Hurling Championship since its establishment by the Waterford County Board in 1964.

The final was played on 9 September 2023 at Walsh Park in Waterford, between Brickey Rangers and Portlaw, in what was their first ever meeting in the final. Brickey Rangers won the match by 0–23 to 1–14 to claim their first ever championship title.

== Qualification ==
Division	Champions
Eastern Intermediate Hurling Championship	Portlaw
Western Intermediate Hurling Championship	Brickey Rangers

== Final ==
9 September 2023 Final	Brickey Rangers	0-23 - 1-14	Portlaw	Walsh Park
	T O'Connell 0-11 (9fs), P Cummins 0-6, S Ronayne 0-4, M Hanlon, D Kelly 0-1 each.		DJ Foran 0-7 (6fs), T Kiely 1-0, C Rooney 0-3, J O'Sullivan, J Power, L Woods, E Burrows 0-1 each.	Referee: N O'Toole

== Top scorers ==
Overall

Rank	Player	Club	Tally	Total
1	Tom O'Connell	Brickey Rangers	0-11	11
2	D. J. Foran	Portlaw	0-07	7
3	Peter Cummins	Brickey Rangers	0-06	6
