= 2021 Waterford Intermediate Hurling Championship =

Annual hurling competition season

- Dates: 2 October 2021
- Teams: 2
- Sponsor: JJ Kavanagh and Sons
- Champions: Dunhill (1st title); David Phelan (captain)
- Runners-up: An Rinn; Ray Ó Ceallaigh (captain)

Tournament statistics
- Matches played: 1
- Goals scored: 2 (2 per match)
- Points scored: 33 (33 per match)
- Top scorer(s): Shane Casey (0-13)

The 2021 Waterford Intermediate Hurling Championship was the 58th staging of the Waterford Intermediate Hurling Championship since its establishment by the Waterford County Board in 1964.

The final was played on 2 October 2021 at Walsh Park in Waterford, between Dunhill and An Rinn, in what was their first ever meeting in the final. Dunhill won the match by 0–22 to 2–11 to claim their third championship title overall and a first title in 10 years.

Dunhill's Shane Casey was the top scorer with 0–13.

== Qualification ==
| Division | Champions |
|---|---|
| Eastern Intermediate Hurling Championship | Dunhill |
| Western Intermediate Hurling Championship | An Rinn |

== Final ==
| 2 October 2021 Final | Dunhill | 0-22 - 2-11 | An Rinn | Walsh Park |
| | S Casey 0-13, B Gallagher 0-3, J Sage 0-2, D Swift 0-1, É Murphy 0-1, T Casey 0-1, C Quinn 0-1. | | O Ó Ceallaigh 1-5, F Ó Ceallaigh 1-0, T Ó hUallacháin 0-2, É Ó Crostaigh 0-1, L Ó Lonáin 0-1, F Ó Cuirrin 0-1, D Breathnach 0-1. | Referee: A Fitzgerald (Gaultier) |

== Top scorers ==
Overall

| Rank | Player | Club | Tally | Total |
|---|---|---|---|---|
| 1 | Shane Casey | Dunhill | 0-13 | 13 |
| 2 | Oisín Ó Ceallaigh | An Rinn | 1-05 | 8 |
| 3 | Feargal Ó Ceallaigh | An Rinn | 1-00 | 3 |
| 3 | Ben Gallagher | Dunhill | 0-13 | 13 |
