= Mikey Kearney =

Irish hurler (born 1995)

Personal information
- Native name: Mícheál Ó Cearnaigh (Irish)
- Born: 19 September 1995 (age 31) Ballyduff, County Waterford, Ireland
- Height: 5 ft 9 in (175 cm)

Sport
- Sport: Hurling
- Position: Forward
Club
- Years: Club
- Ballyduff Upper
Club titles
- Waterford titles: 0
College
- Years: College
- Cork Institute of Technology
College titles
- Fitzgibbon titles: 0
Inter-county*
Years	County	Apps (scores)
2015-2021	Waterford	6 (0-02)
Inter-county titles
- Munster titles: 0
- All-Irelands: 0
- NHL: 1
- All Stars: 0
- *Inter County team apps and scores correct as of 17:31, 29 November 2020.

Michael Kearney (born 19 September 1995) is an Irish hurler who plays for Waterford Premier Intermediate club Ballyduff Upper and formerly at inter-county level with the Waterford senior hurling team. He usually lines out as a forward.

== Playing career ==
=== Blackwater Community School ===
Kearney first came to prominence as a hurler with Blackwater Community School where he played in every grade of hurling. On 23 November 2011, he lined out at midfield when Blackwater CS defeated Dungarvan CBS by 0–11 to 0–08 to win the Dean Ryan Cup. Kearney also lined out for the school in the Harty Cup.

=== Cork Institute of Technology ===
Kearney studied at the Cork Institute of Technology and joined the senior hurling team in his second year at the institute. He was a regular player in several Fitzgibbon Cup campaigns.

=== Ballyduff Upper ===
Kearney joined the Ballyduff Upper club at a young age and played in all grades at juvenile and underage levels before eventually joining the club's top adult team in the Waterford Senior Championship.

Following Ballyduff Upper's relegation from the Waterford Senior Championship in 2019, Kearney was the talisman as Ballyduff Upper achieved promotion by winning the 2020 Intermediate Championship. He scored 0–19 in their victory against Ballyduff Lower, including 0-10 from play. Kearney was then to the fore in 2026 when Ballyduff Upper won their fifth Waterford Intermediate Hurling Championship, beating Roanmore by 3–17 to 3–10. He was Man of the Match in this game scoring 0–8 in total, 0-6 from play.

=== Waterford ===
==== Minor and under-21 ====
Kearney first lined out for Waterford as a member of the minor team during the 2012 Munster Championship. He made his first appearance for the team on 2 May when he was introduced as a 48th-minute substitute in a 1–20 to 3–13 defeat of Clare.

Kearney was again eligible for the minor grade in 2013 and joined the starting fifteen as a midfielder. On 14 July, he scored a point from play in a 2-19 apiece draw with Limerick in the Munster final. Kearney retained his position at midfield for the replay on 23 July, however, he ended on the losing side following a 1–20 to 4–08 defeat. On 8 September, he scored 0-04 from left wing-forward when Waterford defeated Galway by 1–21 to 0–16 in the All-Ireland final.

Kearney joined the Waterford under-21 team in advance of the 2014 Munster Championship. He made his first appearance for the team on 16 July 2014 when he lined out at midfield in a 3–18 to 0–16 defeat by Cork.

After a disappointing 2015 Munster Championship, Kearney was selected for the under-21 team for a third successive season in 2016. On 27 July, he won a Munster Championship medal after a 2–19 to 0–15 defeat of Tipperary in the final. On 10 September, Kearney won an All-Ireland medal after scoring 0-02 from left corner-forward in a 5–15 to 0–14 defeat of Galway in the final.

==== Senior ====
Kearney was added to the Waterford senior team in advance of the 2015 National League. He made his first appearance on 14 February 2015 when he lined out at left corner-forward in a 0–22 to 2–16 draw with Limerick. On 3 May 2015, Kearney won a National League medal as a non-playing substitute when Waterford defeated Cork by 1–24 to 0–17 in the final. He was later included on the Waterford panel for the Munster Championship. On 12 July 2015, Kearney was an unused substitute when Waterford were beaten for the fourth time in six seasons by Tipperary in the Munster final.

On 1 May 2016, Kearney was an unused substitute when Waterford drew 0-22 apiece with Clare in the National League final. He also remained on the bench for the replay, which Waterford lost by 1–23 to 2–19. On 10 July 2016, Kearney was an unused substitute when Waterford suffered a 5–19 to 0–13 defeat by Tipperary in the Munster final.

On 3 September 2017, Kearney was selected as a substitute when Waterford faced Galway in the All-Ireland final. He remained on the bench and ended the game as a runner-up following Galway's 0–26 to 2–17 victory.

On 3 June 2018, Kearney made his first appearance in the Munster Championship when he lined out at right corner-forward against Tipperary. He was substituted in the 47th minute in the eventual 2-22 apiece draw.

On 31 March 2019, Kearney was named at centre-forward but lined out at right wing-forward when Waterford faced Limerick in the National League final. He was held scoreless in the 1–24 to 0–19 defeat.

== Career statistics ==
As of match played 28 November 2020.

Team	Year	National League			Munster		All-Ireland		Total	
Team	Year	Division	Apps	Score	Apps	Score	Apps	Score	Apps	Score
Waterford	2015	Division 1B	3	0-00	0	0-00	0	0-00	3	0-00
Waterford	2016	Division 1B	5	0-03	0	0-00	0	0-00	5	0-03
Waterford	2017	Division 1B	4	0-01	0	0-00	0	0-00	4	0-01
Waterford	2018	Division 1B	5	1-09	2	0-01	—		7	1-10
Waterford	2019	Division 1B	8	0-10	3	0-01	—		11	0-11
Waterford	2020	Division 1A	3	0-02	1	0-00	0	0-00	4	0-02
Career total			28	1-25	6	0-02	0	0-00	34	1-27

== Honours ==
Blackwater Community School

- Dean Ryan Cup (1): 2011

Waterford

- National Hurling League (1): 2015
- All-Ireland Under-21 Hurling Championship (1): 2016
- Munster Under-21 Hurling Championship (1): 2016
- All-Ireland Minor Hurling Championship (1): 2013

Ballyduff Upper

- Waterford Intermediate Hurling Championship (1): 2020, 2026
