= 2022 Waterford Intermediate Hurling Championship =

Annual hurling competition season

- Dates: 8 September 2023
- Teams: 2
- Sponsor: JJ Kavanagh and Sons
- Champions: Ballygunner (1st title); Barry O'Sullivan (captain); Darragh O'Keeffe (captain)
- Runners-up: Ballysaggart; Chris O'Gorman (captain); Sam Ryan (captain)

Tournament statistics
- Matches played: 1
- Goals scored: 5 (5 per match)
- Points scored: 49 (49 per match)
- Top scorer(s): Stephen Bennett (2-13)

The 2022 Waterford Intermediate Hurling Championship was the 59th staging of the Waterford Intermediate Hurling Championship since its establishment by the Waterford County Board in 1964.

The final was played on 8 September 2022 at Fraher Field in Dungarvan, between Ballygunner and Ballysaggart, in what was their second meeting in the final overall and a first final meeting in three years. Ballygunner won the match by 2–29 to 3–20 to claim their second championship title overall and a first title in 38 years.

Ballysaggart's Stephen Bennett was the top scorer with 2–13.

== Qualification ==
Division	Champions
Eastern Intermediate Hurling Championship	Ballygunner
Western Intermediate Hurling Championship	Ballysaggart

== Final ==
8 September 2023 Final	Ballygunner	2-29 - 3-20 (aet)	Ballysaggart	Fraher Field
	J Foley 1-8, D Walsh 0-10 (4fs, 1 65), H Ruddle 0-4, T Gallagher 1-0, C Power, E O'Brien 0-3 each, G Corbett 0-1.		Stephen Bennett 2-13 (8fs, 1 65), K Bennett 1-0, Shane Bennett 0-2, K Cashel, T Nugent, S Ryan, R Walsh, C O'Gorman 0-1 each.	Referee: N O'Toole

== Top scorers ==
Overall

Rank	Player	Club	Tally	Total
1	Stephen Bennett	Ballysaggart	2-13	19
2	Jake Foley	Ballygunner	1-08	11
3	David Walsh	Ballygunner	0-10	10
