= 1964 Waterford Intermediate Hurling Championship =

Annual hurling competition season

- Dates: 18 October 1964
- Teams: 2
- Champions: Ballyduff Upper (1st title)
- Runners-up: Ballyduff Lower

Tournament statistics
- Matches played: 1
- Goals scored: 4 (4 per match)
- Points scored: 14 (14 per match)

The 1964 Waterford Intermediate Hurling Championship was the inaugural staging of the Waterford Intermediate Hurling Championship since its establishment by the Waterford County Board.

The final was played on 18 October 1964 at Fraher Field in Dungarvan, between Ballyduff Upper and Ballyduff Lower, in what was their first ever meeting in the final. Ballyduff Upper won the match by 3–05 to 1–09 to claim their first ever championship title.

== Qualification ==
Division	Champions
Eastern Intermediate Hurling Championship	Ballyduff Lower
Western Intermediate Hurling Championship	Ballyduff Upper

== Final ==
18 October 1964 Final	Ballyduff Upper	3-05 - 1-09	Ballyduff Lower	Fraher Field
				Referee: W Jones (Gael Óg)
