= John Cusack (hurler) =

Irish hurler (1925–2002)

Personal information
- Native name: Seán Cíosóg (Irish)
- Born: 10 March 1925 Clonea, County Waterford, Ireland
- Died: 11 August 2002 (aged 77) Clonea, County Waterford, Ireland
- Occupation: Farmer
- Height: 5 ft 10 in (178 cm)

Sport
- Sport: Hurling
- Position: Full-back
Club
- Years: Club
- Clonea
Club titles
- Waterford titles: 1
Inter-county
- Years: County
- Waterford
Inter-county titles
- Munster titles: 1
- All-Irelands: 1
- NHL: 0

John Cusack (10 March 1925 – 11 August 2002) was an Irish hurler who played as a full-back for the Waterford senior team.

Cusack, after an uneventful underage career, played for the senior team throughout the 1940s and the 1950s. During that time he won one All-Ireland medal and one Munster medal.

At club level Cusack played with Rathgormack Winning Senior Hurling Medal with Clonea in 1952 against T. F. Meaghers on a Scoreline of 1–10 to 2-01
