= Dunhill–Fenor GAA =

Gaelic games club in County Waterford, Ireland

Dunhill–Fenor GAA Club
- Founded: 1989
- County: Waterford
- Colours: Red, black and yellow White and green trim
- Grounds: Pairc Ui Bhriain; William Flynn Park
- Coordinates: 52°10′31.87″N 7°14′57.05″W

Playing kits
Hurling	Football

Dunhill–Fenor GAA Club is a juvenile Gaelic Athletic Association club based in Dunhill and Fenor, County Waterford, Ireland. The club has no adult teams and only fields teams from under-12 to under-21. The juvenile club was established in 1989 by both Dunhill GAA and Fenor GAA in order to improve the quality of both clubs underage teams.

The club presently enters teams at all underage levels in both hurling and gaelic football. The club uses Dunhill's colours when playing hurling and Fenor's colours when playing Gaelic football.
