= John Galvin (hurler) =

Irish hurler

Personal information
- Native name: Seán Ó Gealbháin (Irish)
- Born: 1953 (age 72–73) Portlaw, County Waterford, Ireland

Sport
- Sport: Hurling
- Position: Midfield
Club
- Years: Club
- 1970s-1980s: Portlaw
Club titles
- Waterford titles: 4
Inter-county
- Years: County
- 1972-1986: Waterford
Inter-county titles
- Munster titles: 0
- All-Irelands: 0
- NHL: 0
- All Stars: 2

John Galvin (born 1953) is an Irish retired hurler who played as a midfielder for the Waterford senior team.

The son of All-Ireland-medal winner Willie Galvin, he joined the team during the 1972 championship and became a regular player until his retirement at the end of the 1986 championship. During that time Galvin appeared in numerous Munster finals but ended his career without any major honours. He was Waterford's first recipient of an All-Star award in 1974, adding a second accolade in 1982.

At club level Galvin enjoyed a successful career with Portlaw, winning four county club championship winners' medals.
