= Western Intermediate Hurling Championship =

Annual hurling competition for intermediate clubs in West Waterford

- Irish: Craobhchomórtas Idirmheánach Iomáint Iarthar Phort Láirge
- Code: Hurling
- Founded: 1964; 62 years ago
- Region: Waterford (GAA)
- No. of teams: 5
- Title holders: Ballyduff Upper (2nd title)
- First winner: Ballyduff Upper
- Sponsors: Comeragh Oil
- Official website: Waterford GAA

The Western Intermediate Hurling Championship (known for sponsorship reasons as the Comergah Oil Western Intermediate Hurling Championship and abbreviated to the Western IHC) is an annual hurling competition organised by the western divisional section of the Waterford County Board of the Gaelic Athletic Association since 1964 and contested by intermediate team in the county of Waterford in Ireland.

In its current format, the Western Intermediate Championship begins with a group stage. The seven participating teams are divided into two groups and play each other in a round-robin system. The two top-ranking teams in each group proceed to the knockout phase that culminates with the final match at Fraher Field. The winner of the Western IHC subsequently represent the division in the Waterford IHC.

Ballyduff Upper are the title holders after defeating Kilrossanty by 2-18 to 2–15 in the 2026 final.

== History ==
The Western Intermediate Championship was established in 1964 in an effort to bridge the standard of play between the Waterford SHC and the divisional junior championships. Ballyduff Upper were the first championship winners.

On 31 January 2022, Waterford County Board delegates voted on the restructuring of the entire intermediate hurling championship system following a review process. It was decided to establish an all-county eight-team Waterford Premier Intermediate Championship for 2023. These eight teams were made up of the four semi-finalists from the 2022 Eastern and Western intermediate championships.

== Format ==
=== Group stage ===
The 5 teams are divided into two groups of four and three teams respectively. Over the course of the group stage each team plays once against the others in the group, resulting in each team being guaranteed multiple games. Two points are awarded for a win, one for a draw and zero for a loss. The teams are ranked in the group stage table by points gained, then scoring difference and then their head-to-head record. The top two teams in each group qualify for the knock-out stage.

=== Knockout stage ===
Following the completion of the group stage, the top two teams from each group advance to the knockout stage.

- Semi-finals: The top two teams from the group stage contest this round. The two winners from these two games advance to the final.
- Final: The two semi-final winners contest the final. The winning team are declared champions.

=== Relegation ===
The two bottom-ranked teams from the group stage take part in a relegation playoff to determine who drops to the Western Junior A Hurling Championship.

== Teams ==
=== 2026 teams ===
The following five teams will contest the 2026 Western Intermediate Hurling Championship:

Team	Location	Colours	Championship titles (since 2022)	Last championship title
Ballyduff Upper	Ballyduff	Red and white	1	2024
Colligan–Emmets	Colligan	Amber and black hoops	0	—
Kilrossanty	Lemybrien	Green and gold	0	—
Modeligo	—	Green and white	0	—
Sliabh gCua–St Mary's	Touraneena	Yellow and maroon	0	—

== Qualification for subsequent competitions ==
From its inception in 1964, the Western IHC champions automatically qualify for the Waterford IHC. Here they play the Eastern IHC winners to determine the county champions. This format was abandoned for a period in the late 1970s and early 1980s when a county-wide Waterford IHC was in operation, however, it was later reinstated.

== Sponsorship ==
Comeragh Oil have been the title sponsor of the Western IHC for over 15 years.

== Roll of honour ==
=== Roll of honour (2022–present) ===
#	Club	Titles	Runners-up	Championships won	Championships runner-up
1	Ballyduff Upper	2	2	2024, 2026	2023, 2025
2	Ballysaggart	1	0	2022	—
2	Brickey Rangers	1	0	2023	—
2	An Rinn	1	0	2025	
4	Shamrocks	0	1	—	2022
4	Colligan	0	1	—	2024
4	Kilrossanty	0	1	—	2026

== List of finals ==
=== List of finals (2022–present) ===
Year	Winners		Runners-up		#
Year	Club	Score	Club	Score	#
2026	Ballyduff Upper	2-18	Kilrossanty	2-15	
2025	An Rinn	2-17	Ballyduff Upper	1-19	
2024	Ballyduff Upper	1-24	Colligan	1–12	
2023	Brickey Rangers	0–18	Ballyduff Upper	1–12	
2022	Ballysaggart	1–17	Shamrocks	1–16	

== See also ==
- Waterford Intermediate Hurling Championship
  - Eastern Intermediate Hurling Championship
