= Billy Galvin (hurler) =

Irish hurler

Personal information
- Native name: Liam Ó Gealbháin (Irish)
- Born: Portlaw, County Waterford
- Height: 5 ft 11 in (180 cm)

Sport
- Sport: Hurling
- Position: Right corner-forward
Club
- Years: Club
- Portlaw
Club titles
- Waterford titles: 0
Inter-county
- Years: County
- Waterford
Inter-county titles
- Munster titles: 1
- All-Irelands: 1
- NHL: 0

William Galvin was an Irish hurler who played as a full-back for the Waterford senior team.

Galvin played for the team throughout the 1940s and the 1950s and is regarded as one of the county's greatest players from that era. During that time he won one All-Ireland medal and one Munster medal.

At club level Galvin played with Portlaw.

His son, John, also played hurling with Waterford.
