= Jack Fagan (hurler) =

Irish hurler

Personal information
- Native name: Seán Ó Faogáin (Irish)
- Born: 1995 (age 30–31) Summerhill, County Meath, Ireland
- Height: 6 ft 1 in (185 cm)

Sport
- Sport: Hurling
- Position: Right wing-forward
Clubs
- Years: Club
- Rathmolyon; De La Salle
Club titles
- Waterford titles: 0
College
- Years: College
- Institute of Technology, Carlow
College titles
- Fitzgibbon titles: 0
Inter-county*
Years	County	Apps (scores)
2015 2019-present	Meath; Waterford	3 (2-08); 4 (1-02)
Inter-county titles
- Munster titles: 0
- All-Irelands: 0
- NHL: 0
- All Stars: 0
- *Inter County team apps and scores correct as of 21:24, 28 November 2020.

Jack Fagan (born 1995) is an Irish hurler who plays for Waterford Senior Championship club De La Salle and at inter-county level with the Waterford senior hurling team. He usually lines out as a right wing-forward.

== Career statistics ==
As of match played 28 November 2020.

Team	Year	National League			Ring Cup		Munster		All-Ireland		Total	
Team	Year	Division	Apps	Score	Apps	Score	Apps	Score	Apps	Score	Apps	Score
Meath	2015	Division 2B	1	0-01	3	2-08	—		—		4	2-09
Meath	Total		1	0-01	3	2-08	—		—		4	2-09
Waterford	2016	Division 1A	—		—		—		—		—	
Waterford	2017	Division 1A	—		—		—		—		—	
Waterford	2018	Division 1A	—		—		—		—		—	
Waterford	2019	Division 1B	—		—		—		—		—	
Waterford	2020	Division 1A	5	2-04	—		2	0-00	2	1-02	9	3-05
Waterford	Total		5	2-04	—		2	0-00	2	1-02	9	3-06
Career total			6	2-05	3	2-08	2	0-00	2	1-02	13	5-15
