= Conor Prunty =

Irish hurler

Personal information
- Native name: Conchúr Ó Prionntaigh (Irish)
- Born: 9 January 1997 (age 29) Waterford, Ireland
- Occupation: Engineer
- Height: 6 ft 4 in (193 cm)

Sport
- Sport: Hurling
- Position: Full-back
Club
- Years: Club
- 2014-present: Abbeyside–Ballinacourty
Club titles
	Football	Hurling
Waterford titles	1	0
College
- Years: College
- 2016-2020: Cork Institute of Technology
College titles
- Fitzgibbon titles: 0
Inter-county*
Years	County	Apps (scores)
2017-present	Waterford	8 (0-00)
Inter-county titles
- Munster titles: 0
- All-Irelands: 0
- NHL: 1
- All Stars: 1
- *Inter County team apps and scores correct as of 15:13, 29 November 2020.

Conor Prunty (born 9 January 1997) is an Irish hurler who plays for Waterford Senior Championship club Abbeyside and at inter-county level with the Waterford senior hurling team. He usually lines out as a full-back.

== Playing career ==
=== St. Augustine's College ===
Prunty first came to prominence as a hurler and Gaelic footballer with St. Augustine's College in Dungarvan. He played in every grade before eventually joining the college's senior teams. On 30 March 2013, Prunty was at full-forward when St. Augustine's College faced Scoil Mhuire in the All-Ireland final. He scored a point from play in the 2–08 to 0–10 victory.

=== Cork Institute of Technology ===
During his studies at the Cork Institute of Technology, Prunty was heavily involved in hurling. On 3 March 2016, he was at centre-back when CIT defeated Dublin City University by 1–13 to 0–13 to win the All-Ireland Division 1 Freshers final.

=== Abbeyside–Ballinacourty ===
Prunty joined the Abbeyside–Ballinacourty club at a young age and played in all grades at juvenile and underage levels. He made his first appearance for the club's senior teams during the 2014 Waterford Championship.

On 6 November 2015, Prunty was at midfield when Ballinacourty faced Stradbally in the Waterford Football Championship final. He ended the game as a runners-up following an 0–08 to 0–06 defeat.

Prunty lined out in a second successive Waterford Football Championship final on 6 November 2016. He was once again at midfield, however, The Nire claimed the title following a 1–17 to 0–08 victory.

On 7 October 2018, Prunty lined out for Abbeyside against Ballygunner in the Waterford Championship final. Selected at right wing-back, he spent much of the game at midfield as Abbeyside suffered a 2–19 to 0–13 defeat.

=== Waterford ===
==== Minor and under-21 ====
Prunty first lined out for Waterford as a dual player during the 2014 Munster Championships. He made his first appearance for the Waterford minor hurling team on 9 April when he lined out at right wing-back in a 1–13 to 0–11 defeat of Clare. Prunty made his debut with the Waterford minor football team a week later in a 2–11 to 2–07 defeat by Tipperary. Prunty's football season ended on 29 April with a defeat by Clare, however, he enjoyed an extended run with the minor hurling team. On 13 July, he lined out at right wing-back in Waterford's 2–17 to 3–14 draw with Limerick in the Munster final. Prunty retained his position for the replay on 22 July, which Waterford lost by 0–24 to 0–18.

Prunty was eligible as a dual minor again for the 2015 Munster Championships. Both his football and hurling seasons ended with defeats by Limerick. These were also his last games in the minor grade.

Prunty retained his dual status as a member of both of Waterford's under-21 teams during the 2016 Munster Championships. He made his first appearance for the under-21 football team on 16 March when he lined out at midfield in a 3–18 to 0–02 defeat by Cork. Prunty enjoyed a more successful debut with the under-21 hurling team on 13 July when he lined out at left wing-back in a 3–23 to 1–11 defeat of Clare. He retained his position on the starting fifteen for the Munster final against Tipperary on 27 July and collected a winners' medal following the 2–19 to 0–15 victory. On 10 September, Prunty was again at left wing-back for the All-Ireland final against Galway. He ended the game with an All-Ireland medal following the 5–15 to 0–14 victory.

Prunty ended his dual player status and committed solely to hurling for the 2017 Munster Championship. He made his only appearance on 13 July in a 2–17 to 1–19 defeat by Cork at the semi-final stage.

Prunty was again eligible for the under-21 team for the 2018 Munster Championship. Lining out in his third and final season in the grade, he made his only appearance on 20 June in a second successive 0–23 to 1–17 defeat by Cork.

==== Senior ====
Prunty was added to the Waterford senior team prior to the start of the pre-season Munster League in 2017. He made his first appearance on 8 January, lining out at left wing-back in a 0–24 to 1–14 defeat by Limerick. Prunty remained as a member of the extended panel for the rest of the season which culminated on 3 September with a 0–16 to 2–17 defeat by Galway in the All-Ireland final.

On 11 March 2018, Prunty made his first appearance in the National League when he came on as a 54th-minute substitute for Mark O'Brien in a 1–23 to 1–20 defeat of Clare. He was retained as a member of the panel for the subsequent Munster Championship.

On 31 March 2019, Prunty was introduced as a substitute for Calum Lyons at full-back when Waterford suffered a 1–24 to 0–19 defeat by Limerick in the National League final. He made his first appearance in the Munster Championship on 12 May when he lined out at full-back in a 1–20 to 0–22 defeat by Clare.

On 15 December 2019, it was announced that Prunty would serve as vice-captain of the Waterford senior team for the 2020 season.

== Career statistics ==
As of match played 28 November 2020.

Team	Year	National League			Munster		All-Ireland		Total	
Team	Year	Division	Apps	Score	Apps	Score	Apps	Score	Apps	Score
Waterford	2017	Division 1A	0	0-00	0	0-00	0	0-00	0	0-00
Waterford	2018	Division 1A	1	0-00	0	0-00	—		1	0-00
Waterford	2019	Division 1B	5	0-00	4	0-00	—		9	0-00
Waterford	2020	Division 1A	4	0-00	2	0-00	2	0-00	8	0-00
Career total			10	0-00	6	0-00	2	0-00	18	0-00

== Honours ==
Ballincourty

- Waterford Senior Football Championship (1): 2020

St. Augustine's College

- All-Ireland Colleges Senior C Football Championship (1): 2013

Cork Institute of Technology

- All-Ireland Division 1 Freshers Championship (1): 2016

Waterford

- All-Ireland Under-21 Hurling Championship (1): 2016
- Munster Under-21 Hurling Championship (1): 2016
- National Hurling League (1): 2022 (c)

=== Individual ===
Awards

- GAA-GPA All-Star Award (1): 2021
