= 2019 Waterford Intermediate Hurling Championship =

Annual hurling competition season

- Dates: 19 October 2019
- Teams: 2
- Sponsor: JJ Kavanagh and Sons
- Champions: Ballysaggart (1st title); Shane Bennett (captain); Steven Mangan (captain)
- Runners-up: Ballygunner; Paddy Cooke (captain); Jack Ruddle (captain)

Tournament statistics
- Matches played: 1
- Goals scored: 2 (2 per match)
- Points scored: 35 (35 per match)
- Top scorer(s): Stephen Bennett (0-11)

The 2019 Waterford Intermediate Hurling Championship was the 56th staging of the Waterford Intermediate Hurling Championship since its establishment by the Waterford County Board in 1964.

The final was played on 19 October 2019 at Walsh Park in Waterford, between Ballysaggart and Ballygunner, in what was their first ever meeting in the final. Ballysaggart won the match by 1–19 to 1–16 to claim their first ever championship title.

Ballysaggart's Stephen Bennett was the top scorer with 0–11.

== Qualification ==
Division	Champions
Eastern Intermediate Hurling Championship	Ballygunner
Western Intermediate Hurling Championship	Ballysaggart

== Final ==
19 October 2019 Final	Ballysaggart	1-19 - 1-16	Ballygunner	Walsh Park
	Stephen Bennett 0-11, K Bennett 0-4, E O'Brien 1-0, Shane Bennett 0-2, C Murphy 0-1, R Walsh 0-1.		D Walsh 0-8, S Power 1-2, C Power 0-4, D O'Keeffe 0-1, K Mahony 0-1.	Referee: T Mansfield (Affane)

== Top scorers ==
Overall

Rank	Player	Club	Tally	Total
1	Stephen Bennett	Ballysaggart	0-11	11
2	David Walsh	Ballygunner	0-08	8
3	Stephen Power	Ballygunner	1-02	5
