= Waterford county hurling team =

Hurling team

Waterford
- Sport: Hurling
- Irish: Port Láirge
- Nickname(s): The Déise
- County board: Waterford GAA
- Manager: Stephen Molumphy
- Home venue(s): Azzurri Walsh Park Cappoquin Logistics Fraher Field

Recent competitive record
- Current All-Ireland status: Munster (5th in 2025)
- Last championship title: 1959
- Current NHL Division: 1B (1st in 2025; promoted to Division 1A)
- Last league title: 2022
First colours

The Waterford county hurling team represents Waterford in hurling and is governed by Waterford GAA, the county board of the Gaelic Athletic Association. The team competes in the three major annual inter-county competitions; the All-Ireland Senior Hurling Championship, the Munster Senior Hurling Championship and the National Hurling League.

Waterford's home grounds are Walsh Park, Waterford, and Fraher Field, Dungarvan. The team's manager is Peter Queally.

The team last won the Munster Senior Championship in 2010, the All-Ireland Senior Championship in 1959 and the National League in 2022.

The team is nicknamed the Déise men.

== History ==
=== 1886–1935: Early days ===
The Waterford County Board was established in 1886 in Kilmacthomas and played in the Munster Championship for the first time in 1888, losing to Cork on a score of 2–8 to 0-0. The next fourteen years would consist of walkovers, first round defeats and not entering the competition at all. Waterford would finally win a championship match for the first time in 1903, defeating Kerry by 5–6 to 2–9. In their first Munster final, which did not take place until 1904, Waterford would lose to Cork. The following years led to another series of opening Munster championship match defeats and the occasional walkover, and Waterford would not win another senior championship match until 1925 when Clare were defeated, only for Tipperary to beat them in only their second Munster final. Despite its present reputation as a hurling stronghold, football was initially the preferred Gaelic sport in Waterford: the county was one of only nine to compete in the inaugural All-Ireland football championship in 1887.

At this stage, Waterford was still the only county in Munster not to have won the provincial or All-Ireland hurling title, but there were signs of improvement. The minor hurlers reached the first ever Munster final in 1928, losing to Cork. They would make up for this defeat the following year against Tipperary and would defeat Meath in the All-Ireland final. The junior hurlers secured the county's first ever adult silverware in 1931, winning both the Munster and All-Ireland titles. They would repeat this feat in 1934.

At senior level, the county was edging ever closer to Munster success, with the 1931 team drawing with Cork in the final only to lose the replay by 15 points. A fifth Munster final appearance ended when the match against Limerick was abandoned due to crowd encroachment late on with Limerick leading by 11 points. The title was awarded to Limerick, who would defeat Waterford again in the 1934 decider.

=== 1936–1963: Ascendancy ===
The junior hurlers won the county's third Munster and All-Ireland double at that level in 1936, and the senior hurlers, after those near misses at the start of the decade, were ready to secure the Munster title. An 11-point win over Cork in the 1938 Munster semi-final saw Waterford into their seventh Munster final, where they defeated Clare by 3–5 to 2–5. They reached the county's first ever All-Ireland final after an easy win over Galway, where they went down to Dublin in Croke Park by 2-5 (11) to 1-6 (9). The following year, Waterford played in their first National Hurling League final, losing to Dublin by 1-8 (11) to 1-4 (7).

If Limerick had proven to be Waterford's nemesis in the 1930s, defeating Waterford again in 1940 on their way to another All-Ireland, the 1940s belonged to Cork who would win the All-Ireland four years running from 1941 to 1944 and again in 1946, defeating Waterford in 1943, 1946 and 1947.

By 1948 though, Waterford's time had finally come. Defeating Clare by two points in the Munster semi-final, the margin was even narrower in the Munster final against Cork, Waterford prevailing by a score of 4-7 (19) to 3-9 (18). Galway were overcome in the All-Ireland semi-final, and Dublin – containing RTÉ broadcaster Seán Óg Ó Ceallacháin in the half-forward line – were well beaten, on a score of 6-7 (25) to 4-2 (14). Waterford had won the Liam MacCarthy Cup at last. To add to the joy of 1948, the Minor team would win the county's second Munster and All-Ireland titles, defeating Tipperary (3-6 to 0–3) and Kilkenny (3-8 to 4–2) respectively.

Limerick relieved Waterford of their titles in the first defence in 1949, defeating them by five points in the Munster semi-final. The early 1950s saw Waterford come up against Tipperary and Cork teams at the peak of their powers, and Waterford would not reach another Munster final until 1957.

By this time, Waterford had the nucleus of a team that would contest hurling's major prizes with Tipperary and Kilkenny for the next six years. A close fought victory over Limerick in the semi-final (4-12 to 5-5) saw Waterford into the Munster final where they defeated a Cork team shorn of Christy Ring due to injury on a score of 1-11 (14) to 1-6 (9). Galway were once again defeated in the semi-final, and Kilkenny waited in the final. The game had a few unusual events. Kilkenny paraded around the pitch with sixteen players as British actor John Gregson was being recorded for his role in the film Rooney. The game saw Amhrán na bhFiann being played at the start of the second half as the referee threw the ball in to start the game before the Artane Boys Band had started the anthem. Waterford led the match 1–6 to 1–5 at half-time and had extended that lead to six points with ten minutes to go, but Kilkenny overtook Waterford with two goals and a point to leave them winners on a score of 4-10 (22) to 3-12 (21).

1958 was the first year Waterford won through to the Munster final having won it the previous year, a win over Kerry setting up the shot at a repeat victory. However, Tipperary were convincing winners on a score of 4-12 (24) to 1-5 (8). Tipperary would also defeat Waterford in the county's second National Hurling League final appearance in 1959 by seven points. Galway were the first opponents in that year's Munster championship, and the Tribesmen were well beaten, 7-11 (32) to 0–8. Tipperary were waiting in the semi-final, where they choose to play against a stiff first-half breeze. Waterford took full advantage of this, scoring 8–2 in the first half without reply, and eventually winning 9-3 (30) to 3-4 (13). The county's fourth Munster title was secured with a three-point win over Cork in Thurles. In the All-Ireland final, Kilkenny would make life difficult for Waterford with a string of goals, and with minutes remaining Waterford found themselves in the incredible position of having outscored Kilkenny by seven yet still being three points behind. But Seamus Power's late goal ensured a draw, 1–17 to 5-5. Waterford did not repeat those mistakes in the replay, securing the county's second All-Ireland title, 3-12 (21) to 1-10 (13).

Tipperary got their revenge in the 1960 Munster semi-final for the remarkable scoreline the previous year, and they continued to make life hard for Waterford in 1961, beating Waterford in that year's League final by 6-6 (24) to 4-9 (21). Cork defeated Waterford in the 1961 Munster championship, and while wins over Clare and Cork saw Waterford into the 1962 final, Tipperary hammered Waterford by 20 points to secure a third successive Munster title. The 1963 League final against Tipperary – the 'Home' final as the winners were due to meet New York for the title proper – was much closer, with Waterford winning an eventful match by 2-15 (21) to 4–7. There was to be no such free-scoring the 1963 Munster final though (reached after a six-point in over Limerick in the semi-final), Waterford edging a tense affair by 0–11 to 0–8, a result that would be Tipperary's only senior championship defeat between 1961 and 1965, effectively denying them a 'five-in-a-row'. In the All-Ireland final, Kilkenny were inspired by a 14-point haul from Eddie Keher to a 4-17 (29) to 6-8 (26) victory. There was some consolation for Waterford in the National Hurling League final 'proper', where after a scare in a drawn first game (3-6 to 3–6) Waterford won the replay against New York by 3-10 (19) to 1-10 (13).

=== 1964–1997: Decline ===
It would not have seemed likely in 1964 that Waterford would not win another senior title for nearly fifty years. The county remained competitive in the mid-1960s, narrowly losing out to Cork in 1964 and only losing to the same opposition in 1965 after a replay. But a young Cork team, containing several of the team that would win that year's Under-21 hurling championship, defeated Waterford in the 1966 Munster final. Despite gaining their revenge in the first round of the 1967 Munster championship, Waterford were beginning to struggle. Defeat followed in the Munster semi-final to Tipperary, and Waterford would not win another championship match until 1974.

1974 was a brighter year for Waterford, as the seniors shocked Cork in the first round of the Munster championship, and were only beaten by one point by defending All-Ireland champions Limerick in the semi-final. John Galvin won the county's first All Star award. The county also secured its first ever victory in the Munster Under-21 championship, defeating Clare by 2-5 (11) to 1-3 (6) in the final. Antrim were well beaten in the semi-final to set up another All-Ireland final against Kilkenny, only to see Kilkenny come out winners by a narrow margin once again, 3-8 (17) to 3-7 (16).

However, 1974 was a brief respite on a downward slide for Waterford hurling. A Cork team about to embark on a three-in-a-row of All-Ireland success hammered Waterford by 22 points in the first round in 1975, and the only county Waterford would beat in the Munster championship over the following six years was Kerry. The only bright spot at senior inter-county level would be Mossy Walsh's All Star award in 1980. Mount Sion would also win the county's first Munster club title, defeating South Liberties of Limerick in the final. James Stephens of Kilkenny would defeat Mount Sion by 3-13 (22) to 3-8 (17) in the All-Ireland final.

1982 was the beginning of one of the blackest periods in Waterford's hurling history. An unbeaten run in the league stage of the National League was ended only after a replay in the semi-final by Kilkenny, and a one-point over defending Munster champions Limerick in the semi-final raised hopes that a 23-year wait for Munster success was about to come to an end. But in their first Munster final appearance since 1966, Waterford were humiliated by Cork, losing by 5-31 (46) to 3-6 (15). There was individual reward in the form of All Star awards for Jim Greene and John Galvin (his second), but the disappointment of that year was compounded in 1983. Having overcome a young Tipperary side seeking their county's first championship win in eight years, Waterford were back in the Munster final only to be crushed by Cork again, 3-22 (31) to 0–12.

The Centenary year saw relegation to Division Two of the National Hurling League, a quarter-final defeat by Galway in the Centenary Cup and a one-point defeat by Clare in the Munster championship. Waterford would have to wait until 1989 to win another championship match, a period which would see them relegated to Division Three of the National Hurling League. Waterford would return immediately to Division Two and reach successive League semi-finals in 1987 and 1988, where they were heavily defeated by Galway and Tipperary respectively. 1989 would see a revival in Waterford's fortunes as Clare were beaten by 15 points in the Munster first round then Cork were overcome in the semi-final after two eventful matches. Having let a lead slip in the first game to draw 0-18 each, Waterford reached the Munster final with a two-point win. However, the final was a reminder of those grim days in the early 1980s. Waterford had two players sent off as they slumped to a 0–26 to 2-8 (14) defeat in the 100th Munster final against Tipperary. Cork would end Waterford's interest in the next two championships by a large margin (17 points in 1990) and a small margin (three points in 1991).

=== 1992–2001: Modern revival ===
The 1992 Munster Senior Hurling Championship was a relatively good one for the seniors, defeating Clare after a replay and only losing by three points to Limerick in the semi-final. It was the underage sides though that would provide Waterford with its best year in nearly three decades. The minor hurlers, playing in their first Munster final since 1968, needed a last minute goal to secure a draw, Waterford's 4–7 to Tipperary's 3–10. Between that drawn game and the replay, the Under-21s defeated a Ger Loughnane-managed Clare team by 0–17 to 1-12 (15). The jubilation had barely subsided from that win before the Minors defeated Tipperary in the replay, 2–10 to 0–14. With victories in each grade over Antrim in the semi-finals, a new generation of Waterford fans got to visit Croke Park for the first time. The Minor final ended in a disappointing defeat by Galway, 1-13 (16) to 2-4 (10). The Under-21 final against Offaly was staged a few weeks later in Nowlan Park, Kilkenny. 0–9 to 0-4 down at half-time, a second half hat-trick of goals from Seán Daly kept Waterford in touch before a late goal looked to have secured victory for Waterford. Two late Offaly points ensured a replay on a final score of 4–4 to 0–16. The replay once again had Offaly in front at half-time, 2-3 (9) to 0–6. Waterford held their opponents scoreless in the second half and a late flurry of points secured a 0–12 to 2-3 (9) victory and a first ever All-Ireland Under-21 hurling championship title.

The progress represented by these underage successes was interrupted in the first round of the Munster championship in 1993 as Kerry won in Walsh Park by 4-13 (25) to 3-13 (22), the Kingdom's first senior hurling championship win since 1926. The next few years would be frustratingly unfulfilling for a county expecting great things after the events of 1992. A narrow defeat by Limerick in 1994 was followed by a big defeat in 1995 to Tipperary, a year which saw another heavy National League semi-final defeat by a Clare team on its way to a first All-Ireland success in 81 years with much of the team beaten by the Under-21s in 1992. The Under 21s had also beaten Clare in the 1994 Munster final, before losing by 2-21 (27) to 3-6 (15) in an unusual Munster-Leinster all-Ireland semi-final pairing. The minors reached three finals in a row between 1994 and 1996, but were well beaten in each one.

A close loss to Tipperary in Walsh Park in the 1996 Munster semi-final suggested there might be life in the 1992 generation. The appointment of former Cork All-Ireland winning trainer Gerald McCarthy as Waterford manager was seen as a statement of intent on the part of the County Board. A poor first half performance cost them dear in the first round against Limerick in 1997, but the introduction of the hurling ‘back door’ gave Waterford extra incentive to perform well in the 1998 championship, especially with a relatively kind draw in Munster. An excellent run in the National League saw Waterford reach their first final since 1963, laying the semi-final hoodoo with a five-point win over Limerick. A tight match in the final saw Cork pull away for a flattering win by 2-14 (20) to 0–13. The morale that had been raised on the back of that run in the League was nearly squandered as Waterford needed a late flurry of point to secure an even more flattering eight points win against Kerry. Despite this, confidence was high going into a semi-final that, due to the Munster finalists being guaranteed a place in the All-Ireland series, had an extra frisson of tension. The Waterford hurlers did not disappoint, securing a 0–21 to 2-12 (18) win over Tipperary. Waterford were back in the Munster final and heading for Croke Park.

The 1998 Munster final was memorable on many levels. On a windy day in Thurles, Waterford struggled to keep in touch with Clare, All-Ireland champions for two of the previous three years, but when Paul Flynn fired a free to the net with the match entering injury time to level the scores, Waterford had a golden opportunity to win it from a 100-metre free. Flynn's effort drifted wide but the replay was much anticipated by a crowd enthralled by the draw. The replay was an unpleasant affair, a chaotic throw-in eventually leading to the suspension of Clare hurler Colin Lynch, a decision that would leave much bad feeling between the two counties, and the sending off of Brian Lohan and Micheal White early in the game set the tone for the match itself. Clare would eventually run out comprehensive 2-16 (22) to 0-10 winners, and Waterford had to play Galway in the All-Ireland quarter-finals a week later.

On the back of two hard matches on the previous Sundays, Waterford were underdogs against Galway. But Waterford dominated from start to finish, ending up easy winners by 1-20 (23) to 1-10 (13). This set up a first championship meeting with Kilkenny in 35 years, and a low-scoring game saw Waterford battle back from being six points down midway through the second half to only lose by a point. Incredibly, Waterford had scored five more points over the course of their four championship ties with Kilkenny, yet the record was 3–1 to the Cats. The season ended with Tony Browne winning his first All Star and also the Hurler of the Year award.

Expectations were once again high in Waterford in 1999. They seemed to be justified when they secured a narrow one-point win over Limerick, their first win over Limerick since 1982. Waterford found themselves in the unusual position of being favourites against Cork, but a poor Waterford effort and a spectacular eight points from play from Michael O'Connell in the Cork midfield left Waterford losers on a score of 0–24 to 1-15 (18). Another good run in the 2000 National Hurling League ended once again in the semi-finals, this time to Galway, and Waterford went out of the Munster championship with a whimper, beaten 0–17 to 0-14 by Tipperary. The Gerald McCarthy era, which had promised so much, ended in a cruel manner against Limerick in 2001. Waterford raced into a 2-6 (12) to 0–1 lead after 15 minutes, but Limerick hung in and scored three goals in the last ten minutes to break Waterford's resistance, winning in the end by 4-11 (23) to 2-14 (20).

=== 2001–2013: McCarthy, Fitzgerald and Munster breakthrough ===
==== 2002 ====
It was with this unpromising setup that another former All-Ireland winner with Cork, Justin McCarthy became manager. An unremarkable League performance did not suggest Waterford were ready to topple Cork, but despite having a five-point second half lead eroded to nothing late in the game, Waterford held their nerve to score a late point from Ken McGrath and a 1-16 (19) to 1-15 (18) victory. The reigning Munster and All-Ireland champions Tipperary were warm favourites in the Munster final that followed. A spectacular display of shooting from Waterford gave the Déise a 2-23 (29) to 3-12 (21) victory that was more impressive than the final margin of eight points suggested. Waterford were confident of adding the All-Ireland crown to this first Munster title in 39 years. Despite a flying start in the semi-final against Clare, they eventually faded to lose by three points. The season was still a success from a Waterford perspective, and Fergal Hartley, Eoin Kelly and Ken McGrath were selected for All Star awards.

==== 2003 ====
Waterford began the defence of their sixth Munster title with an easy win over Kerry before meeting Limerick a match where, unusually among modern GAA championship matches, no cameras were present due to a fire safety issue at Thurles, thus ensuring only those who were there got to enjoy a thrilling tie, with Waterford as in 2001 racing into an early lead only to be hauled back by Limerick. The match ended level, 4-13 (25) each, but the televised replay was an anti-climax, with Waterford hanging on for a 1-13 (16) to 0–14 victory. The Munster final against Cork featured a hat-trick of goals from a player on the losing team, in this case John Mullane of Waterford. They had failed to make a first half breeze count and, despite the heroics from Mullane, Cork won by four points, 3-16 (25) to 3-12 (21). John Mullane's performance would be pivotal in him securing Waterford's sole All Star for the year, as the season petered out in the All-Ireland series with a disappointing 1-20 (23) to 0–18 defeat in Waterford's first ever championship match with Wexford.

==== 2004 ====
The 2004 National League saw Waterford reach their seventh final, secured by finishing top of a second phase of group games thanks to a late equalising point from Paul Flynn against Tipperary. There was more disappointment though as Galway were convincing 2-15 (21) to 1-13 (16) winners. To regain the Munster title, Waterford were going to have to do it the hard way by beating Clare and Tipperary just to reach the final. A measure of revenge for 1998 was secured against Clare as Waterford sensationally trounced the Banner County by 3-21 (30) to 1-8 (11), a performance illuminated by a hat-trick of goals from Dan Shanahan. The semi-final was a much tighter affair, with a late goal from sub Paul O'Brien needed to beat Tipperary by 4-10 (22) to 3-12 (21). The final against Cork was hailed to be one of the best Munster finals with a match that ebbed and flowed turned on an audacious dipping medium range free from Paul Flynn that surprised the Cork backs for a goal. Waterford secured their seventh Munster title with one point, 1-21 (24) to 3-16 (25), win. The All-Ireland semi-final saw another clash with Kilkenny and another three-point defeat, a first-half salvo of three goals giving Waterford a mountain that proved too difficult to climb. Gallingly for Waterford, Kilkenny had come through the All-Ireland series, and would lose out in the final to Cork who themselves had come through the 'back door'. Paul Flynn's tally of 0–13 against Kilkenny would copperfasten his first All Star award, with Dan Shanahan getting his first and Ken McGrath winning his second, only the second Waterford man after John Galvin to win multiple All Stars.

==== 2005–2006 ====
For the most part, 2005 and 2006 saw Waterford go backwards under Justin McCarthy. A narrow defeat by Cork in the Munster semi-final left Waterford in a round robin group in the All-Ireland qualifiers, where facile wins over Dublin and Offaly were rendered moot by a 4-14 (26) to 0–21 defeat by Clare in the final group match in Ennis. This left Waterford with a more difficult quarter-final against Cork, in which stout Waterford resistance was ended five minutes from the end by a Brian Corcoran goal, Cork eventually winning by 1-18 (21) to 1-13 (16). An eight-point defeat by Tipperary in the 2006 Munster championship, Waterford's largest championship defeat in eight years, suggested Waterford were in decline, but a 1-25 (28) to 2-20 (26) win over Galway in the qualifiers, allied with comfortable wins over Westmeath and Laois, gave Waterford another shot at Tipperary in the quarter-finals. This time they took their second chance, surviving a late Tipperary rally to win by 1-22 (25) to 3-13 (22). Cork stood between Waterford and the final, and another tension-filled match saw Cork overhaul Waterford in the last ten minutes. Waterford kept in touch to the point where a late Ken McGrath free from his own half could have given Waterford a draw, but Cork goalkeeper Donal Óg Cusack took the risk of blocking the ball from going over the bar and Cork held on for a one-point win. Eoin Murphy won his first All Star award, while Dan Shanahan and Tony Browne both won their second award, Browne his first in eight years.

==== 2007 ====
Justin McCarthy secured another year in charge on the back of the performance in 2006, and after an indifferent run in the group stages of the 2007 National League which saw Waterford just qualify for the quarter-finals, there was little to suggest a successful year. But tight wins over Tipperary and Cork saw Waterford into another League final, and with the scores level going into injury time in the final against Kilkenny, two late points gave Waterford a 0–20 to 0–18 victory and only their second National League title. Waterford's winning ways continued with a three-point win over Cork in the Munster semi-final in a game overshadowed by the suspension of three Cork players in a brawl that took place before their first round win over Clare. In the final against Limerick, Dan Shanahan scored three second-half goals as Waterford won the Munster title for the eighth time. The Intermediate hurling team also won the Munster title for the very first time, although they would eventually lose to Wexford in the All-Ireland final.

A shock loss by Cork at the hands of Tipperary in the qualifiers meant Waterford had to face a full-strength Cork in the quarter-finals. Ahead for most of the game, Waterford once again found themselves behind as the match entered injury time, but a Stephen Molumphy goal and a controversial pointed free from Eoin Kelly, after Donal Óg Cusack was penalised for lying on the ball in the small square gave Waterford a second chance. A week later, two Dan Shanahan goals proved instrumental in giving Waterford a 2–17 (23) to 0–20 win. Waterford had only one week to prepare for an All-Ireland semi-final rematch with Limerick and this time it was Limerick who got off to a flying start, leading by ten points inside the first ten minutes. Waterford would cut the gap to a point late in the second half but frailties in the full back line were punished by Limerick with late goals to give them a 5-11 (26) to 2-15 (21) win, condemning Waterford to their fifth All-Ireland semi-final loss in ten years. The season ended on an upbeat note with a record five All Star awards, Tony Browne and Ken McGrath winning their third awards, Dan Shanahan his third also, and Stephen Molumphy and Michael Walsh their first. Shanahan was further rewarded by being named undisputed Hurler of the Year.

==== 2008 ====
Waterford started off the year with a Munster Championship first round clash with Clare at the Gaelic Grounds, Limerick on 1 June 2008. Waterford, missing a number of first team regulars such as Ken McGrath, Eoin Kelly and Eoin Murphy succumbed to a youthful Clare team on a scoreline of Waterford 0–23 Clare 2–26. Soon after the game, manager, Justin McCarthy was fired from his position by the Waterford County Board. It was rumoured at the time that player unrest had a lot to do with the decision. The Waterford County Board acted quickly and appointed former Clare goalkeeper Davy Fitzgerald as new Waterford manager on 10 June 2008. The loss to Clare sent Waterford into the All-Ireland Qualifier Series. The first round match against Antrim saw the return of both Ken McGrath and Eoin Kelly. Davy Fitzgerald started his Waterford managerial career with the unusual decision of placing Ken McGrath at full back in order to strengthen the full back line. The decision paid off and the match turned out to be a complete mismatch, with Waterford running out winners on a scoreline of Waterford 6-18 Antrim 0–15.

Waterford were then pitted against Offaly in their Phase 4 Qualifier on 19 July 2008 at Semple Stadium, Thurles. After a stern test in the first 60 minutes, Waterford eventually pulled away towards the end winning on a scoreline of Waterford 2-18 Offaly 0–18. This resulted in Waterford reaching the All-Ireland Quarter Finals and a match-up against Leinster runners-up Wexford. This was a competitive match which tooed and froed from one side to the other. However, a late barrage of points saw Waterford over the line by 2–19 to 3–15. The win against Wexford led Waterford to their sixth All-Ireland Semi-Final since 1998. The opponents would be a highly fancied Tipperary, who were reigning National Hurling League and Munster champions. Waterford started a blistering page, going six points to nil up after only 10 minutes. However, Tipperary were level going in at half-time. Both teams scored goals in rapid succession in the second half. Waterford's nerve held and they managed to win by two points on a scoreline of Waterford 1-20 Tipperary 1–18. It was Waterford's first semi-final win since 1963 and brought to an end a run of five consecutive semi-final defeats. They met an inspired Kilkenny team in the All-Ireland final, who ran out 3–30 to 1–13 winners, which saw them complete the three-in-a-row. The inter-county year ended with Eoin Kelly being named as the Déise's only All Star.

==== 2009 ====
Waterford played Limerick in the Semi Final of the Munster Championship in Thurles on 14 June. The game was not a good game with players referring to the sliotar as being like a bar of soap. The match ended in a draw 1–8 to 0-11 and is said to be the worst Munster Championship game in modern times. The replay took place the following Saturday evening. Waterford were comfortable winners on a scoreline of 0–25 to 0–17. Waterford played Tipperary in the Munster Final on 12 July in Thurles, having agreed to play the game there to mark the 125th anniversary of the foundation of the GAA in the town. Waterford never looked like they were going to win and lost by four points on a scoreline of 4–14 to 2–16. A positive result on the day was the Waterford minor hurlers' victory over Tipperary, the county's first Munster championship success in the grade since 1992.

Waterford went into the All-Ireland Quarter-Final again Galway as outsiders. Having struggled throughout the game, with John Mullane not scoring until the last minute, Waterford eventually emerged one-point winners in an eventful finish. Dan Shanahan came on as a sub with 4 minutes to go and proved to be Waterford's saviour, setting up fellow substitute Shane Walsh to score the only goal of the game before winning a vital free for Eoin Kelly to convert. Mullane's point set up a semi-final clash with reigning three-time champions Kilkenny. Despite two goals from Shane Walsh, Kilkenny led for most of the game and eventually won by five points before going on to win their fourth consecutive title.

==== 2010 ====
Waterford started out by winning the Waterford Crystal Cup, their first since 1998. They defeated Clare in the Munster Semi-Final and won their ninth Munster title when they defeated Cork after extra time with a cracking goal from Dan Shanahan in a replay in Thurles. The All-Ireland semi-final saw them lose at that stage for the seventh time in thirteen years, beaten by seven points by Tipperary.

=== 2013–2018: Derek McGrath ===
==== 2015 ====
In May, Waterford in Derek McGrath's second year as manager won their first league title since 2007 after a 1–24 to 0–17 win against Cork in the final.

Waterford beat Cork to make the Munster Final, but lost to Tipperary by five points.

Waterford also notably used squad numbers in 2015.

==== 2017 ====
In 2017, Waterford suffered defeat in the All Ireland Senior Hurling Championship against Galway with a final score of 0–26 to 2–17.

=== 2018–present: After McGrath ===
Páraic Fanning manager, 2018–2019

Liam Cahill was appointed manager.

Cahill led Waterford to the 2020 All-Ireland Senior Hurling Championship Final and the 2022 National Hurling League title. He left his position as Waterford manager in 2022.

Davy Fitzgerald returned as manager.

Then, in 2024, Peter Queally succeeded Fitzgerald.

== Support ==
Waterford has its own supporters' club, known as Club Déise. It held events to raise funds for the team in advance of the 2017 All-Ireland Senior Hurling Championship Final.

== Panel ==
Team as per Waterford vs Limerick in the All-Ireland SHC semi-final, 7 August 2021

No.	Player	Position	Club
1	Shaun O'Brien	Goalkeeper	De La Salle
2	Ian Kenny	Right corner back	Ballygunner
3	Conor Prunty (c)	Full back	Abbeyside
4	Shane McNulty	Left corner back	De La Salle
5	Calum Lyons	Right half back	Ballyduff Lower
6	Shane Bennett	Centre back	Ballysaggart
7	Kieran Bennett	Left half back	Ballysaggart
8	Jamie Barron	Midfield	Fourmilewater
9	Peter Hogan	Midfield	Ballygunner
10	Jack Fagan	Right half forward	De La Salle
11	Jack Prendergast	Centre forward	Lismore
12	Stephen Bennett	Left half forward	Ballysaggart
13	Dessie Hutchinson	Right corner forward	Ballygunner
14	Austin Gleeson	Full forward	Mount Sion
15	Patrick Curran	Left corner forward	Dungarvan

No.	Player	Position	Club
16	Billy Nolan	Substitute	Roanmore
17	Kevin Moran	Substitute	De La Salle
18	Darragh Lyons	Substitute	Dungarvan
19	Billy Power	Substitute	Clonea
20	Shane Fives	Substitute	Tourin
21	Michael Kiely	Substitute	Abbeyside
22	Neil Montgomery	Substitute	Abbeyside/Ballinacourty
23	Jake Dillon	Substitute	De La Salle
24	Conor Gleeson	Substitute	Fourmilewater
25	Colin Dunford	Substitute	Colligan
26	Mikey Kearney	Substitute	Ballyduff Upper

^{INJ} Player has had an injury which has affected recent involvement with the county team.
^{RET} Player has since retired from the county team.
^{WD} Player has since withdrawn from the county team due to a non-injury issue.

== Management team ==
Appointed August 2024:

- Manager: Peter Queally

== Managerial history ==
- Tony Mansfield 1986–1990
- Joe McGrath 1990–1991
- Georgie Leahy 1991–1994
- Tony Mansfield (2) 1994–1996
- Gerald McCarthy 1996–2001
- Justin McCarthy 2001–2008
- Davy Fitzgerald 2008-2011
- Michael Ryan 2011–2013
- Derek McGrath 2013–2018
- Páraic Fanning 2018–2019
- Liam Cahill 2019–2022
- Davy Fitzgerald (2) 2022–2024
- Peter Queally 2024–

== Honours ==
=== National ===
- All-Ireland Senior Hurling Championship
  - (gold) Winners (2): 1948, 1959
  - (silver) Runners-up (6): 1938, 1957, 1963, 2008, 2017, 2020
- National Hurling League
  - (gold) Winners (4): 1962–63, 2007, 2015, 2022
  - (silver) Runners-up (7): 1938–39, 1958–59, 1960–61, 1998, 2004, 2016, 2019
- All-Ireland Junior Hurling Championship
  - (gold) Winners (2): 1931, 1934
  - (silver) Runners-up (1): 1936
- All-Ireland Under-21 Hurling Championship
  - (gold) Winners (2): 1992, 2016
  - (silver) Runners-up (1): 1974
- All-Ireland Minor Hurling Championship
  - (gold) Winners (4): 1929, 1948, 2013, 2025
  - (silver) Runners-up (1): 1992

=== Provincial ===
- Munster Senior Hurling Championship
  - (gold) Winners (9): 1938, 1948, 1957, 1959, 1963, 2002, 2004, 2007, 2010
  - (silver) Runners-up (21): 1903, 1925, 1929, 1931, 1933, 1934, 1943, 1958, 1962, 1966, 1982, 1983, 1989, 1998, 2003, 2009, 2011, 2012, 2015, 2016, 2020
- Waterford Crystal Cup
  - (gold) Winners (3): 1998, 2010, 2011
  - (silver) Runners-up (1): 2008
- Munster Intermediate Hurling Championship
  - (gold) Winners (1): 2007
  - (silver) Runners-up (5): 1965, 2002, 2003, 2009, 2010
- Munster Junior Hurling Championship
  - (gold) Winners (3): 1931, 1934, 1936
- Munster Under-21 Hurling Championship
  - (gold) Winners (4): 1974, 1992, 1994, 2016
  - (silver) Runners-up (3): 1964, 2007, 2009
- Munster Minor Hurling Championship
  - (gold) Winners (4): 1929, 1948, 1992, 2009
  - (silver) Runners-up (16): 1928, 1931, 1934, 1947, 1955, 1956, 1958, 1968, 1994, 1995, 1996, 2010, 2011, 2013, 2014, 2021, 2025
