= Maurice Shanahan =

Waterford hurler

Personal information
- Native name: Muiris Ó Seanacháin (Irish)
- Nickname: Shandy
- Born: 1 February 1990 (age 36) Waterford, Ireland
- Occupation: Truck driver
- Height: 1.93 m (6 ft 4 in)

Sport
- Sport: Hurling
- Position: Full-forward
Club
- Years: Club
- 2007–: Lismore
Club titles
- Waterford titles: 0
Inter-county*
Years	County	Apps (scores)
2009–2019	Waterford	37 (7–121)
Inter-county titles
- Munster titles: 1
- All-Irelands: 0
- NHL: 1
- All Stars: 1
- *Inter County team apps and scores correct as of 16:00, 17 October 2019.

Maurice Shanahan (born 1 February 1990) is an Irish hurler who plays as a right corner-forward at senior level for the Waterford county team.

Born in Lismore, County Waterford, Shanahan first played competitive hurling during his schooling at Blackwater Community School. He arrived on the inter-county scene at the age of seventeen when he first linked up with the Waterford minor team, before later joining the under-21 side. He made his senior debut during the 2009 championship. Shanahan immediately became a regular member of the starting fifteen and has won one Munster medal and one National Hurling League medal.

At club level Shanahan plays with Lismore.

His brother, Dan, also had a lengthy career with Waterford.

In 2015, Maurice spoke candidly to the Irish media about suffering from depression.

== Club ==
Shanahan has played with his club, Lismore since a young age. Shanahan plays as a forward for the club. Lismore reached the county final in 2009 but lost to Ballygunner after a two-game contest. The next few years proved unsuccessful for Lismore culminating in a shock relegation from the senior ranks after 47 years as a senior club. The club bounced back immediately in 2016 by winning the county intermediate championship. Lismore and Shanahan also added the Munster Intermediate title that year by seeing off Kerry champions Kilmoyley 2–14 to 0–13, with Shanahan scoring 1–9.

== Inter-county ==
Shanahan first came to attention for Waterford in 2009 at U-21 level with a good performance against Tipperary winning 3–21 to 2–14. Waterford lost to Clare in the Munster final. Shanahan made his Senior Inter-county debut for Waterford against Tipperary in the first round of the 2009 National Hurling League. 2009 continued to be a successful year as he established himself in the Waterford senior setup after his performance at under-21 level.

By 2015, Shanahan was a well established member of the Waterford senior hurling team. Waterford won their third National Hurling League title that year with victory over Cork 1–24 to 0–17. They also reached the All Ireland semi final that year but Kilkenny defeated them 1–20 to 0–18. Shanahan was honoured that year by winning his first All star award.

== Career statistics ==
Team	Year	National League			Munster		All-Ireland		Total	
Team	Year	Division	Apps	Score	Apps	Score	Apps	Score	Apps	Score
Waterford	2009	Division 1	3	0-00	1	0-00	2	0-00	6	0-00
Waterford	2010	Division 1	6	0-24	3	0-01	0	0-00	9	0-25
Waterford	2011	Division 1	3	0-05	2	0-03	1	0-02	6	0-10
Waterford	2012	Division 1A	5	2-13	2	0-15	1	0-09	8	2-37
Waterford	2013	Division 1A	4	0-09	1	0-07	3	1-22	8	1-38
Waterford	2014	Division 1A	3	0-04	1	0-00	0	0-00	4	0-04
Waterford	2015	Division 1B	6	2-11	2	1-17	2	1-21	10	4-49
Waterford	2016	Division 1A	7	0-30	2	1-02	3	0-05	12	1-37
Waterford	2017	Division 1A	4	0-08	1	1-01	5	1-08	10	2-17
Waterford	2018	Division 1A	5	0-00	2	1-07	0	0-00	7	1-07
Waterford	2019	Division 1A	2	0-01	3	0-01	0	0-00	5	0-02
Total			48	4-105	20	4-54	17	3-67	85	11-226

== Honours ==
Lismore

- Waterford Intermediate Hurling Championship (1): 2016
- Munster Intermediate Club Hurling Championship (1): 2016

Waterford

- Munster Senior Hurling Championship (1): 2010
- National Hurling League (1): 2015

=== Individual ===
- All-Stars (1): 2015
