= St Molleran's GAA =

Gaelic games club in County Waterford, Ireland

St Mollerans GAA
- Naomh Maoilearáin, Carraig Beag
- Founded: 1942
- County: Waterford
- Colours: Maroon and white
- Coordinates: 52°20′39.47″N 7°25′41.60″W

Playing kits
Standard colours

Saint Molleran's GAA is a Gaelic Athletic Association club based in Carrick-Beg, County Waterford, Ireland. The club enters teams in both GAA codes each year, which includes two adult hurling teams and one adult Gaelic football team in the Waterford County Championships.

== Achievements ==
- Waterford Senior Hurling Championships (0): (runner-Up 1971)
- Waterford Intermediate Hurling Championships (2): 1970, 1995
- Waterford Junior Hurling Championships (1): 1964
- Waterford Junior Football Championships (1): 2004
