= Billy Power (hurler) =

Irish hurler

Personal information
- Native name: Liam de Paor (Irish)
- Born: 21 May 1999 (age 27) Rathgormack, County Waterford, Ireland
- Occupations: Irish and P.E. Teacher
- Height: 5 ft 9 in (175 cm)

Sport
- Sport: Dual Player
- Position: Left corner-forward
Club*
| Years | Club | Apps (scores) |
| 2017-present | Clonea | 12 (0-92) |
Club titles
- Waterford titles: 0
College
- Years: College
- 2018-2022: University of Limerick
College titles
- Fitzgibbon titles: 1
Inter-county**
| Years | County | Apps (scores) |
| 2019-present | Waterford | 1 (0-00) |
Inter-county titles
- Munster titles: 0
- All-Irelands: 0
- NHL: 1
- All Stars: 0
- * club appearances and scores correct as of 22:24, 28 November 2020. **Inter County team apps and scores correct as of 22:24, 28 November 2020.

Billy Power (born 1999) is an Irish hurler who plays for Waterford Senior Championship club Clonea and at inter-county level with the Waterford senior hurling team. He usually lines out as a midfielder.

== Playing career ==
=== Waterford ===
Power first played for Waterford at minor level during the 2017 Munster Minor Championship, lining out in three successive defeats but ending the short-lived campaign as top scorer with 0–15. After one season in the minor grade, Power was drafted onto the Waterford under-20 team for the 2019 Munster Under-20 Championship. His sole season in the grade ended with a 3–23 to 0-10 first-round defeat by Tipperary.

Power was added to the Waterford senior hurling team in advance of the 2020 season. He made his first appearance for the team on 29 December 2019 when he lined out at right corner-forward in a 1–17 to 1–13 defeat by Cork in the pre-season Munster League. Power was retained on the training panel for the subsequent National League and made his first appearance in the 3–18 to 1–15 defeat of Westmeath in the second round. He made his championship debut on 31 October 2020 when he was introduced as a 55th-minute substitute for Kieran Bennett in a 1–28 to 1–24 defeat of Cork in the Munster semi-final.

== Career statistics ==
As of match played 28 November 2020.

| Team | Year | National League | | | Munster | | All-Ireland | | Total | |
| Team | Year | Division | Apps | Score | Apps | Score | Apps | Score | Apps | Score |
|---|---|---|---|---|---|---|---|---|---|---|
| Waterford | 2020 | Division 1A | 1 | 0-00 | 1 | 0-00 | 0 | 0-00 | 2 | 0-00 |
| Career total | | | 1 | 0-00 | 1 | 0-00 | 0 | 0-00 | 2 | 0-00 |

== Honours ==
University of Limerick

- Fitzgibbon Cup: 2022
- All-Ireland Freshers' Hurling Championship: 2019

Clonea

- Waterford Intermediate Hurling Championship: 2018

Awards

- Waterford Young Footballer of the Year: 2017
