= Dunhill GAA =

Gaelic games club in County Waterford, Ireland

- Dún Aill CLG
- County: Waterford
- Colours: Red, black and yellow
- Grounds: Pairc Ui Bhriain
- Coordinates: 52°10′31.87″N 7°14′57.05″W

Playing kits
Standard colours

Senior Club Championships
	All Ireland	Munster champions	Waterford champions
Football:	-	-	1
Hurling:	-	-	2
Ladies' football:	–	–	2

Dunhill GAA is a Gaelic Athletic Association club based in Dunhill, County Waterford, Ireland. The club enters teams in both GAA codes each year, which includes two adult hurling teams and one adult Gaelic football team in the Waterford County Championships.

The club has won the County Senior Hurling Championship twice, defeating Ballyduff Upper in 1978 and Mount Sion 1979, and the Senior Football Championship once, when it defeated Tramore in 1975.

The club presently has no underage setup. Instead, a separate club called Dunhill/Fenor was created between Dunhill and other local club, Fenor. The underage clubs caters for all underage levels from under-12 to under-21.

== Honours ==
- Waterford Senior Hurling Championships: 2
  - 1978, 1979
- Waterford Senior Football Championships: 1
  - 1975
- Waterford Intermediate Hurling Championships: 3
  - 1966, 2011, 2021
- Waterford Intermediate Football Championships: 1
  - 1970
- Waterford Junior Hurling Championships: 4
  - 1932, 1952, 1965, 1973
- Waterford Junior Football Championships: 1
  - 1954
- Waterford Minor Football Championships: 1
  - 1944 (as Dunhill O'Brienn's)
- Waterford Ladies' Senior Football Championships: 2
  - 1980, 1981
