= Clonea Power–Rathgormack GAA =

Irish Gaelic Athletic Association club

Rathgormack GAA Club
- Rath Ó gCormac CLG
- Founded: 1884
- County: Waterford
- Nickname: The Village
- Colours: Red and Green
- Grounds: John Curry Park
- Coordinates: 52°18′38.90″N 7°28′38.49″W

Playing kits
Standard colours

Senior Club Championships
	All Ireland	Munster champions	Waterford champions
Football:	-	-	13
Hurling:	-	-	5

Rathgormack GAA is a GAA club based in the Rathgormack region of County Waterford. The club fields teams in gaelic football only.

Rathgormack GAA Club is a Gaelic football club which is assisted by Clonea Power Hurling Club, both club's which are in the parish of Clonea and Rathgormack. This arrangement between the two clubs was put in place in 1989.

== History ==
Football was played in the village of Rathgormack before the foundation of the GAA in 1884. It was one of the first parts of Waterford to be affiliated to the organisation.

In the late 1880s and 1890s the club was officially known as the "Clodagh Campaigners" denoting the national feelings of the time-Parnell and the land league and the river that flows through the parish.

County Senior Football Honours came Rathgormacks way in 1909 and again in 1910, 1912, 1913 and 1918. They contested Senior finals in 1920, 1924 and 1930 without success.

The club went a number of decades without senior success but did win the 1934 Junior Title and in 1935 brought home the first County Minor Football title to the parish.

Two football clubs existed in the district between 1936 and 1940 and met once in the first round of the 1936 championship.

The club went into a decline in the 1940s, but came back again. Revival signs occurred in the 1960s and in 1963 Junior Football Divisional Honours came back to Rathgormack and was followed in 1964 by County success.

During the 1970s intermediate triumph was achieved. The club did not always confine itself to football and the club's hurling team won Divisional Honours at junior level in 1977.

The club acquired its own property in 1982, and it was declared officially open on 2 June 1984 (Centenary Year) and it was a unique project at the time, being clear of debt. In 1984, the club won the County Intermediate title to regain its Senior Status, which it has maintained since.

In the 1990s the Club concentrated solely on football while its sister club Clonea concentrated on hurling. Both clubs along with the parish of Windgap continue to assist each other in both codes. The club regained the premier title and brought home the Conway Cup after a lapse of 9 decades in the 1990s. County Final wins also came their way in 1995 at the expense of neighbours Kilrossanty, Gaultier a year later and a win over Stradbally in the 1999 decider.

Nowadays the club lends its support to a Ladies Football Team, Comeragh Rangers.

In 2005 the club grounds were re-developed and officially named and dedicated to the memory of Johnny Curry.

As part of the GAA's 125 year celebrations, the club launched a book on football in Rathgormack, 'The Spirit of Rathgormack - The History of Football in Rathgormack 1884 - 2009'.

== Honours ==
- Waterford Senior Hurling Championships: 5
  - 1902, 1903, 1905, 1907, 1952
- Waterford Senior Football Championships: 14
  - 1909, 1910, 1912, 1913, 1914, 1918, 1995, 1996, 1999, 2019, 2023, 2024, 2025, 2026
- Waterford Intermediate Hurling Championships: 4
  - 1977, 1981, 2006, 2018
- Waterford Intermediate Football Championships: 2
  - 1974, 1984
- Waterford Junior Hurling Championships: 3
  - 1929, 1939, 1970
- Waterford Junior Football Championships: 5
  - 1934, 1964, 1999, 2011, 2019
- Waterford Under-21 Hurling Championships: 2
  - 1978, 1979
- Waterford Under-21 Football Championships: 6
  - 1989, 1991, 1994, 2011, 2013, 2015
- Waterford Minor Hurling Championships: 2
  - 2001, 2002
- Waterford Minor Football Championships: 4
  - 1935, 1987, 2012, 2017

== Notable players ==
- John Cusack (hurler)
- Jimmy Galvin
- Johnny O'Connor (hurler)
- Billy Power (hurler)
