= Waterford Intermediate Hurling Championship =

Annual hurling competition for intermediate clubs in Waterford

- Current season or competition: 2026 Waterford Intermediate Hurling Championship
- Irish: Craobhchomórtas Idirmheánach Iomáint Phort Láirge
- Code: Hurling
- Founded: 1964; 62 years ago
- Region: Waterford (GAA)
- No. of teams: 2
- Title holders: Ballyduff Upper (5th title)
- First winner: Ballyduff Upper
- Most titles: Ballyduff Upper (5 titles)
- Sponsors: JJ Kavanagh & Sons
- Official website: Waterford GAA

The Waterford Intermediate Hurling Championship (known for sponsorship reasons as the JJ Kavanagh & Sons Intermediate Hurling Championship and abbreviated to the Waterford IHC) is an annual hurling competition organised by the Waterford County Board of the Gaelic Athletic Association since 1964 and contested by the divisional intermediate champions in the county of Waterford in Ireland. It is the third tier overall in the entire Waterford hurling championship system.

In its current format, the championship begins after the conclusion of the respective Eastern and Western divisional championships. Both divisional champions contest the final, usually at Walsh Park, to determine the county champions. The winner gains automatic promotion to the Waterford Premier Intermediate Championship the following season.

The competition has been won by 30 teams. Ballyduff Upper are the most successful team in the tournament's history, having won it five times. Ballyduff Upper are the title holders after defeating Roanmore by 3-17 to 3-10 in the 2026 final.

== History ==
The Waterford Intermediate Championship was established in 1964 in an effort to bridge the standard of play between the Waterford Senior Championship and the Waterford Junior Championship. For almost 60 years, the Waterford Intermediate Championship was the second tier championship in the Waterford hurling championship system.

On 31 January 2022, Waterford County Board delegates voted on the restructuring of the entire intermediate hurling championship system following a review process. It was decided to establish an all-county eight-team Waterford Premier Intermediate Championship for 2023. These eight teams were made up of the four semi-finalists from the 2022 Eastern and Western intermediate championships.

== Format ==
=== Current format ===
Final: The two of divisional champions contest the final. The winning team are declared champions.

== Teams ==
=== Qualification ===
Division	Championship	Qualifying teams
Eastern Board	Eastern Intermediate Hurling Championship	Champions
Western Board	Western Intermediate Hurling Championship	Champions

=== 2026 Teams ===
11 clubs will compete in the 2026 Waterford Intermediate Hurling Championship: five teams from the Eastern championship and five teams from the Western championship.

Team	Location	Division	Colours	Intermediate titles	Last Intermediate title
Ballyduff Upper	Ballyduff	West	Red and white	4	2020
Butlerstown		East		1	1971
Colligan–Emmets	Colligan	West	Amber and black hoops	0	—
Dunhill	Dunhill	East		3	2021
Erins Own	Waterford	East	Yellow and blue	2	1997
Kilrossanty	Lemybrien	West	Green and Gold	0	—
Micheal MacCraith	Tramore	East		0	—
Modeligo	Modeligo	West	Green and white	0	—
Roanmore B	Waterford	East	Sky Blue and white	1	2010
Sliabh gCua–St Mary's	Touraneena	West	Yellow and maroon	0	—
St Molleran's	Carrick-Beg	East	Maroon and white	2	1995

== Qualification for subsequent competitions ==
From its inception in 2004, the Waterford IHC champions automatically qualified for the Munster Club IHC. Portlaw were the first team to represent Waterford in the provincial series. No team represented Waterford in the provincial championship in 2007 and 2008. Cappoquin (2014) and Lismore (2016) were the only two Waterford clubs to win the Munster club title. Runners-up Ballysaggart represented Waterford in 2022 due to the fact that Ballygunner's second team were not allowed to participate. From 2023, the Waterford PIHC champions represent Waterford in the Munster Club IHC.

== List of finals ==
=== List of Waterford IHC finals ===
Year	Winners		Runners-up		#
Year	Club	Score	Club	Score	#
2026	Ballyduff Upper	3-17	Roanmore	3-10	
2025	An Rinn	2-15	Roanmore	2-14	
2024	Portlaw	5-17	Ballyduff Upper	2-13	
2023	Brickey Rangers	0-23	Portlaw	1-14	
2022	Ballygunner	2-29	Ballysaggart	3-20	
2021	Dunhill	0-22	An Rinn	2-11	
2020	Ballyduff Upper	1-32	Ballyduff Lower	2-23	
2019	Ballysaggart	1-19	Ballygunner	1-16	
2018	Clonea	2-13	Clashmore-Kinsalebeg	1-12	
2017	An Rinn	0-18	Clonea	0-13	
2016	Lismore	5-19	Dunhill	1-07	
2015	Portlaw	1-11	Modeligo	0-12	
2014	Cappoquin	2-19	St. Saviour's	2-11	
2013	Ardmore	0-23	Dunhill	2-13	
2012	An Rinn	1-14	Portlaw	0-04	
2011	Dunhill	0-10	Tourin	1-06	
2010	Roanmore	0-16	Ardmore	1-10	
2009	Dungarvan	1-20	Clonea	2-16	
2008	An Rinn	3-05	St. Molleran's	2-05	
2007	Passage	2-16	Dungarvan	1-13	
2006	Clonea	2-09	Dungarvan	2-04	
2005	Ballyduff Upper	(1-13) 1-15 (R)	Passage	(1-13) 0-08 (R)	
2004	Portlaw	0-18	Shamrocks	1-02	
2003	Abbeyside	3-12	Erin's Own	4-08	
2002	Ardmore	2-05	Clonea	0-10	
2001	Fourmilewater	1-14	Dunhill	2-07	
2000	Ballyduff Lower	2-07	Abbeyside	0-09	
1999	Shamrocks	1-12	Dunhill	0-07	
1998	Stradbally	0-11	Ballyduff Lower	1-06	
1997	Erin's Own	1-09	Shamrocks	0-07	
1996	Abbeyside	0-18	Ferrybank	0-14	
1995	St. Molleran's	1-14	Cappoquin	2-09	
1994	Erin's Own	0-09	Abbeyside	0-04	
1993	Stradbally	3-07	Clonea	1-09	
1992	Colligan Rockies	0-09	Clonea	0-05	
1991	St. Saviours	2-05	Erin's Own	2-04	
1990	De La Salle	2-13	Shamrocks	0-06	
1989	Fourmilewater	1-11	Erin's Own	1-08	
1988	Passage	4-08	Fourmilewater	1-08	
1987	Tallow	2-09	Erin's Own	2-03	
1986	Dungarvan	0-16	Passage	3-05	
1985	Colligan Rockies	3-10	Passage	1-11	
1984	Ballygunner	1-12	Dungarvan	2-04	
1983	St. Mary's	2-07	Ballygunner	1-09	
1982	Shamrocks	0-14	Ballygunner	1-08	
1981	Clonea	2-13	Ferrybank	1-10	
1980	St. Mary's	2-16	Dungarvan	3-10	
1979	Fourmilewater	3-09	St. Mary's	1-08	
1978	Dungarvan	1-14	Stradbally	0-08	
1977	Clonea	3-07	Fourmilewater	0-04	
1976	Cappoquin	0-13	Passage	1-01	
1975	Ballyduff Upper	4-11	Clonea	4-09	
1974	Tallow	4-11	Clonea	1-02	
1973	Ballydurn	2-12 -	Fourmilewater	1-05	
1972	Shamrocks	4-09	Ballydurn	1-02	
1971	Butlerstown	4-07	Tallow	2-03	
1970	St. Molleran's	4-09	Cappoquin	4-03	
1969	Lismore	5-07	Tramore	0-03	
1968	Eire Og (Dungarvan)	4-06	Griffiths Place (Waterford)	1-04	
1967	Geraldines	2-07	St. Molleran's	1-03	
1966	Dunhill	4-06	Ardmore	2-04	
1965	De La Salle	4-14	Geraldines	2-04	
1964	Ballyduff Upper	3-05	Ballyduff Lower	1-09	

== Roll of honour ==
=== By club ===
#	Club	Titles	Championships won
1	Ballyduff Upper	5	1964, 1975, 2005, 2020, 2026
2	Clonea	4	1977, 1981, 2006, 2018
2	An Rinn	4	2008, 2012, 2017, 2025
4	Shamrocks	3	1972, 1982, 1999
4	Fourmilewater	3	1979, 1989, 2001
4	Dungarvan	3	1978, 1986, 2009
4	Dunhill	3	1966, 2011, 2021
4	Portlaw	3	2004, 2015, 2024
9	St Mary's	2	1980, 1983
9	Tallow	2	1974, 1987
9	De La Salle	2	1965, 1990
9	Colligan Rockies	2	1985, 1992
9	St Molleran's	2	1970, 1995
9	Erin's Own	2	1994, 1997
9	Stradbally	2	1993, 1998
9	Abbeyside	2	1996, 2003
9	Passage	2	1988, 2007
9	Ardmore	2	2002, 2013
9	Cappoquin	2	1976, 2014
9	Lismore	2	1969, 2016
9	Ballygunner	2	1984, 2022
22	Geraldines	1	1967
22	Éire Óg	1	1968
22	Butlerstown	1	1971
22	Ballydurn	1	1973
22	St Saviour's	1	1991
22	Ballyduff Lower	1	2000
22	Roanmore	1	2010
22	Ballysaggart	1	2019
22	Brickey Rangers	1	2023

== Records and statistics ==
=== Final ===
==== Team ====
- Most wins: 5:
  - Ballyduff Upper (1964, 1975, 2005, 2020, 2026)
- Most appearances in a final: 11:
  - Clonea (1974, 1975, 1977, 1981, 1992, 1993, 2002, 2006, 2009, 2017, 2018)
- Most appearances in a final without ever winning: 2:
  - Ferrybank (1981, 1996)
- Most defeats: 7:
  - Clonea (1974, 1975, 1992, 1993, 2002, 2009, 2017)

=== Teams ===
==== Gaps ====
Longest gaps between successive championship titles:

- 47 years: Lismore (1969-2016)
- 45 years: Dunhill (1966-2011)
- 38 years: Cappoquin (1976-2014)
- 38 years: Ballygunner (1984-2002)
- 30 years: Ballyduff Upper (1975-2005)
- 25 years: Clonea (1981-2006)
- 25 years: De La Salle (1965-1990)
- 25 years: St Molleran's (1970-1995)
- 23 years: Dungarvan (1986-2009)
- 19 years: Passage (1988-2007)

=== Top scorers ===
Year	Top scorer	Team	Score	Total
2019	Stephen Bennett	Ballysaggart	0-11	11
2020	Mikey Kearney	Ballyduff Upper	0-19	19
2021	Shane Casey	Dunhill	0-13	13
2022	Stephen Bennett	Ballysaggart	2-13	19
2023	Tom O'Connell	Brickey Rangers	0-11	11
2024	Evan Burrows	Portlaw	0-13	13
2025	Donie Breathnach	An Rinn	1-06	9
2026	Mikey Kearney	Ballyduff Upper	0-08	8

== See also ==
- Waterford Senior Hurling Championship (Tier 1)
- Waterford Premier Intermediate Hurling Championship (Tier 2)
- Waterford Junior A Hurling Championship (Tier 4)
- Waterford Junior B Hurling Championship (Tier 5)
- Waterford Junior C Hurling Championship (Tier 6)
