= Ballyduff Lower GAA =

Gaelic sports club in County Waterford, Ireland

Ballyduff Lower GAA Club
- Baile Uí Dhuibh
- County: Waterford
- Colours: Red and White
- Grounds: Tom Cheasty Park
- Coordinates: 52°14′06.06″N 7°17′54.02″W

Playing kits
Standard colours

Senior Club Championships
	All Ireland	Munster champions	Waterford champions
Football:	-	-	1
Hurling:	-	-	2

Ballyduff Lower GAA is a Gaelic Athletic Association club based in Ballyduff Lower, County Waterford, Ireland. The club enters teams in both the Waterford Intermediate Hurling Championship and the Waterford Intermediate Football Championship.

== Underage ==
Ballyduff reformed an underage club in 2008 and fielded teams for the first time since 1992.

== Honours ==
- Waterford Senior Hurling Championships: 2
  - 1906, 1970(Ballyduff/Portlaw)
- Waterford Senior Football Championships: 1
  - 1887
- Munster Junior Club Hurling Championship
  - Runner-Up 2016
- Waterford Intermediate Hurling Championship: (1)
  - 2000 | Runner-Up 1998, 2020
- Waterford Intermediate Football Championship: (0)
  - Runner-Up 1983, 2009
- Waterford Junior Hurling Championship: (4)
  - 1961, 1983, 1997, 2016 | Runner-Up 1925, 1955, 1960
- Waterford Junior Football Championship (4)
  - 1968 (with Portlaw), 1974, 2003, 2019 | Runner-Up 2016
- Waterford Minor Hurling Championship (0)
  - Runner-Up 1960 (with Portlaw)
- Waterford Minor Football Championship (0)
- Winner 1999 (with Butlerstown)
