= 2025 Waterford Premier Intermediate Hurling Championship =

Annual hurling competition season

- Dates: 11 July - 30 August 2025
- Teams: 8
- Sponsor: Cappoquin Logistics
- Champions: Ballygunner
- Runners-up: Tallow
- Relegated: Mícheál Mac Craith

Tournament statistics
- Matches played: 20
- Goals scored: 57 (2.85 per match)
- Points scored: 703 (35.15 per match)

The 2025 Waterford Premier Intermediate Hurling Championship was the third staging of the Waterford Premier Intermediate Hurling Championship since its establishment by the Waterford County Board in 2023. The draw for the group stage pairings was made on 27 January 2025. The championship ran from 11 July to 30 August 2025.

The final was played on 30 August 2025 at Walsh Park in Waterford, between Ballygunner and Tallow, in what was their first ever meeting in the final. Ballygunner won the match by 1-21 to 2-11 to claim their first ever championship title.

== Team changes ==
=== To Championship ===
Relegated from the Waterford Senior Hurling Championship

- Tallow

Promoted from the Waterford Intermediate Hurling Championship

- Portlaw

=== From Championship ===
Promoted to the Waterford Senior Hurling Championship

- Brickey Rangers

Relegated to the Waterford Intermediate Hurling Championship

- Dunhill

== Group A ==
=== Group A table ===
Semi-finalist Quarter-finalist Preliminary quarter-finalist

Team	Matches				Score			Pts
Team	Pld	W	D	L	For	Against	Diff	Pts
Ballysaggart	3	3	0	0	83	48	35	6
Aff/Cappoquin/Tour	3	2	0	1	59	63	-4	4
Portlaw	3	1	0	2	38	60	-22	2
Mícheál Mac Craith	3	0	0	3	54	63	-9	0

=== Group A results ===
11 July 2025 Round 1	Mícheál Mac Craith	3-16 - 2-20	Ballysaggart	Abbeyside Grounds

12 July 2025 Round 1	Affane/Cappoquin/Tourin	1-18 - 1-13	Portlaw	Páirc Naomh Bríd

19 July 2025 Round 2	Portlaw	0-09 - 2-21	Ballysaggart	Páirc Naomh Bríd

19 July 2025 Round 2	Mícheál Mac Craith	2-11 - 1-21	Affane/Cappoquin/Tourin	Páirc Naomh Bríd

25 July 2025 Round 3	Portaw	1-10 - 1-09	Mícheál Mac Craith	Kill Grounds

25 July 2025 Round 3	Affane/Cappoquin/Tourin	0-14 - 2-24	Ballysaggart	Lismore Grounds

== Group B ==
=== Group B table ===
Semi-finalist Quarter-finalist Preliminary quarter-finalist

Team	Matches				Score			Pts
Team	Pld	W	D	L	For	Against	Diff	Pts
Ballygunner	3	3	0	0	96	62	34	6
Tallow	3	2	0	1	81	57	24	4
Clash–Kinsalebeg	3	0	1	2	59	76	-17	1
Shamrocks	3	0	1	2	50	91	-41	1

=== Group B results ===
11 July 2025 Round 1	Shamrocks	1-12 - 3-30	Ballygunner	Cappoquin Logistics Fraher Field

13 July 2025 Round 1	Tallow	0-26 - 1-12	Clashmore–Kinsalebeg	Cappoquin Sportsfield

18 July 2025 Round 2	Ballygunner	0-30 - 3-15	Clashmore–Kinsalebeg	Páirc Dúngarbháin

18 July 2025 Round 2	Tallow	5-17 - 1-12	Shamrocks	Cappoquin Sportsfield

26 July 2025 Round 3	Shamrocks	2-14 - 1-17	Clashmore–Kinsalebeg	Cappoquin Sportsfield

27 July 2025 Round 3	Ballygunner	0-27 - 2-17	Tallow	Fraher Field

== Knockout stage ==
=== Preliminary quarter-finals ===
1 August 2025 Pre. quarter-final	Shamrocks	1-21 - 0-15	Mícheál Mac Craith	Páirc Naomh Bríd

1 August 2025 Pre. quarter-final	Portlaw	2-11 - 0-21	Clashmore–Kinsalebeg	Cappoquin Logistics Fraher Field

=== Relegation final ===
16 August 2025 Final	Portlaw	3-13 - 0-21	Mícheál Mac Craith	Kilmacthomas Grounds

=== Quarter-finals ===
8 August 2025 Quarter-final	Affane/Cappoquin/Tourin	2-29 - 2-15	Shamrocks	Castle Grounds

8 August 2025 Quarter-final	Tallow	1-18 - 2-14	Clashmore–Kinsalebeg	Cappoquin Logistics Fraher Field

=== Semi-finals ===
15 August 2025 Semi-final	Ballygunner	0-25 - 1-15	Affane/Cappoquin/Tourin	Cappoquin Logistics Fraher Field
	C Hartley (0-9; 0-5f; 0-1 ‘65); G Corbett (0-4); M Hartley and T Spain (0-3 each); C O’Sullivan and P Power (0-2 each); C Berry and C Cantwell (0-1 each)	Report	E Murray (0-9; 0-8f; 0-1 ‘65); T McCarthy (1-1); C Rooney and A O’Sullivan (0-2 each); K O’Sullivan (0-1)

16 August 2025 Semi-final	Ballysaggart	3-14 - 2-24	Tallow	Cappoquin Logistics Fraher Field

=== Final ===
30 August 2025 Final	Ballygunner	1-21 - 2-11	Tallow	Walsh Park
	M Hartley (0-10, 4fs), G Corbett (1-3), T Spain, C O'Sullivan (0-3 each), P Power, D O'Keeffe (0-1 each).	Report	T Ryan, S Murphy (1-2 each); R Grey (1f, 1 65), D Buckley (1f), I Beecher (0-2 each), M O'Brien (0-1).
