= 2025 Waterford Senior Hurling Championship =

Annual hurling competition season

- Dates: 12 July – 14 September 2025
- Teams: 12
- Sponsor: JJ Kavanagh and Sons
- Champions: Ballygunner (24th title); Adam Hogan (captain); Mikey Mahony (captain); Jason Ryan (manager)
- Runners-up: Mount Sion; P. J. Fanning (captain); Jamie O'Meara (manager)
- Relegated: Brickey Rangers

Tournament statistics
- Matches played: 43
- Goals scored: 108 (2.51 per match)
- Points scored: 1569 (36.49 per match)
- Top scorer(s): Tom O'Connell (4–68)

The 2025 Waterford Senior Hurling Championship was the 125th staging of the Waterford Senior Hurling Championship since its establishment by the Waterford County Board in 1897. The draw for the group stage pairings was made on 27 January 2025. The championship ran from 12 July to 7 September 2025.

Ballygunner entered the championship as the defending champions. Brickey Rangers were relegated after just one season in the top flight after losing a playoff to Ferrybank.

The final was played on 7 September 2025 at Walsh Park in Waterford, between Ballygunner and Mount Sion, in what was their 16th meeting in the final overall and a first meeting in the final in three years. Ballygunner won the match by 2–25 to 1–16 to claim their 24th championship title overall and a 12th championship title in succession.

Tom O'Connell was the championship's top scorer with 4–68.

== Format change ==
A motion by the Ferrybank club proposing two groups of six teams was passed prior to the championship draw. The top two teams in each group qualify for the quarter-finals. The remaining four teams in each group qualify for the preliminary quarter-finals.

== Team changes ==
=== To Championship ===
Promoted from the Waterford Premier Intermediate Hurling Championship

- Brickey Rangers

=== From Championship ===
Relegated to the Waterford Premier Intermediate Hurling Championship

- Tallow

== Group A ==
=== Group A table ===
Quarter-finalists Preliminary quarter-finalists

Team	Matches				Score			Pts
Team	Pld	W	D	L	For	Against	Diff	Pts
Mount Sion	5	5	0	0	146	75	71	10
Lismore	5	4	0	1	116	90	26	8
Passage	5	3	0	2	111	113	−2	6
Fourmilewater	5	2	0	3	121	110	11	4
Dungarvan	5	1	0	4	89	111	−22	2
Ferrybank	5	0	0	5	66	150	−84	0

=== Group A results ===
12 July 2025 Round 1	Passage	1–11 – 2–24	Mount Sion	Walsh Park
	T Carey 1–4, G Cullinane 0–2, P Walsh 0–1, R Jacob 0–1, S Cullinane 0-, S Kelly 0–1, E Reilly 0–1.		M O'Neill 0–10, A Regan 1–6, J Meaney 1–1, A Kirwan 0–3, B Frisby 0–2, E Curran 0–1, S Roche 0–1.

12 July 2025 Round 1	Dungarvan	1–21 – 1–13	Ferrybank	Walsh Park
	P Curran 0–6, Cathal Curran 0–4, Colm Curran 0–4, A Shanahan 1–0, E O'Callaghan 0–3, E Burke 0–2, J Duggan 0–1, B Curran 0–1.		M O'Brien 0–7, S Oates 1–0, N O'Sullivan 0–3, F McGarity 0–1, R McGarity 0–1, N Mac Cathmhaoil 0–1.

12 July 2025 Round 1	Lismore	1–19 – 0–21	Fourmilewater	Cappoquin Logistics Fraher Field
	B O'Sullivan 1–3, B Cummins 0–5, M Shanahan 0–3, J O'Keeffe 0–2, O O'Gorman 0–2, J O'Keeffe 0–1, C Lineen 0–1, D Prendergast 0–1, P Prendergast 0–1.		E Spellman 0–6, J Barron 0–4, C Walsh 0–3, T Barron 0–3, T Guiry 0–2, M Morrissey 0–2, P Walsh 0–1.

18 July 2025 Round 2	Passage	1–23 – 0–25	Fourmilewater	St Molleran's Park
	T Carey 0–10, M Fitzgerald 1–4, M Cummins 0–5, C Drohan 0–1, E Reilly 0–1, R Jacob 0–1, K Cullinane 0–1.		E Spellman 0–9, J Barron 0–4, C Ryan 0–3, O Walsh 0–2, T Barron 0–2, C Walsh 0–2, T Guiry 0–2, M Morrissey 0–1.

19 July 2025 Round 2	Lismore	1–22 – 0–10	Ferrybank	Cappoquin Logistics Fraher Field
	B Cummins 1–5, O O'Gorman 0–4, J Prendergast 0–4, Jamie O'Keeffe 0–2, Joe O'Keeffe 0–2, B O'Sullivan 0–2, F Reaney 0–1, C Daly 0–1, P Prendergast 0–1.		M O'Brien 0–6, S Oates 0–2, A Kinsella 0–1, R McGarrity 0–1.

19 July 2025 Round 2	Dungarvan	0–11 – 1–15	Mount Sion	Busjy Park
	P Curran 0–5, C Curran 0–4, D Hamilton 0–1, D O'Callaghan 0–1.		M O'Neill 1–11, S Roche 0–1, A Regan 0–1, J Gleeson 0–1, E Curran 0–1.

25 July 2025 Round 3	Mount Sion	5–28 – 1–09	Ferrybank	Walsh Park
	Jamie Meaney 2–1, S Roche 1–4, G Power 1–2, J Gleeson 0–5, A Gleeson 0–4, PJ Fanning 0–4, Jack Meaney 1–0, J Byrne 0–2, A Kirwan 0–1, J Kennedy 0–1, E Adebayo 0–1, T Corcoran 0–1, L O'Brien 0–1, A Coughlan 0–1.		M O'Brien 0–6, C Haley 1–2, C Mac Cathmahoil 0–1.

26 July 2025 Round 3	Dungarvan	1–15 – 1–23	Fourmilewater	Cappoquin Logistics Fraher Field
	P Curran 0–10, E O'Callaghan 1–0, Colm Curran 0–2, Cathal Curran 0–2, Cormac Curran 0–1.		E Spellman 0–8, S Walsh 1–2, M Morrissey 0–3, C Walsh 0–3, T Guiry 0–3, O Walsh 0–2, D Guiry 0–1, A Ryan 0–1.

26 July 2025 Round 3	Lismore	0–24 – 0–18	Passage	Walsh Park
	B Cummins 0–9, C Daly 0–3, J Prendergast 0–3, F Reaney 0–3, J O'Keeffe 0–2, O O'Gorman 0–2, A Whelan 0–1, J Lenihan 0–1.		T Carey 0–5, M Fitzgerald 0–5, G Cullinane 0–3, M Cummins 0–2, E Reilly 0–2, R Jacob 0–1.

2 August 2025 Round 4	Mount Sion	2–21 – 1–16	Lismore	Cappoquin Logistics Fraher Field
	M O'Neill 0–11, S Roche 1–2, A Kirwan 1–0, J Meaney 0–2, A Gleeson 0–2, PJ Fanning 0–1, E Curran 0–1, L O'Brien 0–1, J Gleeson 0–1.		J Prendergast 0–8, Jamie O'Keeffe 1–0, Joe O'Keeffe 0–3, F Reaney 0–2, B Cummins 0–2, C Lineen 0–1.

3 August 2025 Round 4	Passage	3–16 – 1–19	Dungarvan	Walsh Park
	T Carey 0–5, J Roche 1–1, S Kelly 0–4, C O'Neill 1–0, E Reilly 1–0, R Jacob 0–2, M Fitzgerald 0–2, G Cullinane 0–1, P Walsh 0–1.		P Curran 0–12, E Burke 1–1, D Hamilton 0–3, C Curran 0–1, J Lacey 0–1, E O'Callaghan 0–1.

3 August 2025 Round 4	Ferrybank	1–13 – 1–27	Fourmilewater	Cappoquin Logistics Fraher Field
	M O'Brien 0–8, R McGarity 1–1, R Carew 0–2, C Haley 0–1, C Mac Cathmhaoil 0–1.		A Spellman 0–7, S Walsh 1–3, A Ryan 0–4, M Morrissey 0–4, D Guiry 0–2, C Walsh 0–2, O Walsh 0–2, J Barron 0–1, T Barron 0–1, S Ryan 0–1.

10 August 2025 Round 5	Dungarvan	0–14 – 2–20	Lismore	Cappoquin Logistics Fraher Field
	C Curran 0–4, T Loftus 0–2, J Lacey 0–2, B Curran 0–1, A Shanahan 0–1, J Burke 0–1, E Burke 0–1, K Daly 0–1, C Curran 0–1.		J Prendergast 1–3, I Daly 0–4, B Trigg 1–0, B Cummins 0–3, J O'Keeffe 0–3, C Daly 0–2, F Reaney 0–2, B O'Sullivan 0–1, P Kearney 0–1, C Lineen 0–1.

10 August 2025 Round 5	Ferrybank	0–12 – 3–19	Passage	Walsh Park
	M O'Brien 0–9, C mac Cathmhaoil 0–1, S Oates 0–1, D Griffin 0–1.		T Carey 1–5, M Cummins 0–6, M Fitzgerald 1–1, M Hutchinson 1–0, S Kelly 0–3, E Lynch 0–1, D Lynch 0–1, J Roche 0–1, S White 0–1.

10 August 2025 Round 5	Fourmilewater	0–19 – 1–25	Mount Sion	St Molleran's Park
	E Spellman 0–7, J Barron 0–3, S Ryan 0–2, P Walsh 0–2, M Morrissey 0–1, O Walsh 0–1, D Guiry 0–1, S Walsh 0–1.		A Regan 1–5, A Gleeson 0–6, M O'Neill 0–6, J Gleeson 0–2, M Daykin 0–2, D Power 0–1, J Kennedy 0–1, B Frisby 0–1, PJ Fanning 0–1.

== Group B ==
=== Group B table ===
Quarter-finalists Preliminary quarter-finalists

Team	Matches				Score			Pts
Team	Pld	W	D	L	For	Against	Diff	Pts
Ballygunner	5	5	0	0	166	68	98	10
Roanmore	5	3	1	1	112	120	−8	7
De La Salle	5	3	0	2	118	109	9	6
Clonea	5	2	0	2	97	113	−16	4
Abbeyside	5	1	1	3	98	118	−20	3
Brickey Rangers	5	0	0	5	86	149	−63	0

=== Group B results ===
12 July 2025 Round 1	Clonea	1–22 – 1–19	Brickey Rangers	Cappoquin Logistics Fraher Field
	J Power 1–4, B Power 0–4, F Roche 0–4, K Power 0–3, S Curry 0–3, G Power 0–2, J Kirwan 0–1, R Flynn 0–1.		T O'Connell 0–9, C O'Grady 1–0, C Deevy 0–2, P Cummins 0–2, S Lennon 0–1, S Ronayne 0–1, C Whelan 0–1, C Ryan 0–1, J Hahessy 0–1, M Cummins 0–1.

13 July 2025 Round 1	Ballygunner	2–26 – 0–11	Abbeyside	Walsh Park
	D Hutchinson 1–9, E Cuddihy 1–2, K Mahony 0–4, P Hogan 0–3, M Mahony 0–2, P Leavey 0–2, R Power 0–1, H Ruddle 0–1, J Foley 0–1, C Tobin 0–1.		C Treen 0–3, M O'Halloran 0–3, R Walsh 0–2, E Kiely 0–1, D Walsh 0–1, D Mackle 0–1.

13 July 2025 Round 1	De La Salle	2–14 – 1–18	Roanmore	Walsh Park
	J Twomey 1–3, R Halloran 0–5, S Flynn 1–0, B Cunningham 0–3, S O'Brien 0–1, K Moran 0–1, T Douglas 0–1.		G O'Brien 0–10, B Everard 1–1, B Nolan 0–3, E Flynn 0–1, C Wadding 0–1, O Hartery 0–1, L Hearne 0–1.

19 July 2025 Round 2	Clonea	1–17 – 2–20	Roanmore	Walsh Park
	B Power 0–9, F Roche 1–1, J Power 0–3, K Power 0–1, R Flynn 0–1, R Elliffe 0–1, T Skehan 0–1.		G O'Brien 1–7, L Hearne 1–1, R Furlong 0–2, E Flynn 0–2, B Nolan 0–2, P O'Sullivan 0–2, C Wadding 0–1, J Chester 0–1, B Nolan 0–1, B Everard 0–1.

19 July 2025 Round 2	Ballygunner	4–26 – 0–08	Brickey Rangers	Walsh Park
	D Hutchison 2–10, E Cuddihy 1–3, J Foley 1–1, R Power 0–3, K Mahony 0–2, M Mahony 0–2, E O'Brien 0–2, T Spain 0–2, P Hogan 0–1.		T O'Connell 0–6, C Whelan 0–1, P Cummins 0–1.

19 July 2025 Round 2	De La Salle	1–16 – 2–10	Abbeyside	Cappoquin Logistics Fraher Field
	R O'Halloran 0–7, T Douglas 0–4, T Moran 1–0, J Twomey 0–2, K Moran 0–2, C Dawson 0–1.		M Kiely 2–3, M O'Halloran 0–5, D Mackle 0–1, N Montgomery 0–1.

25 July 2025 Round 3	De La Salle	3–25 – 2–18	Brickey Rangers	Páirc Naomh Bríd
	R Halloran 1–10, T Douglas 1–5, J Twomey 1–3, B Cunningham 0–4, M Costigan 0–2, T Moran 0–1.		T O'Connell 1–6, S Lennon 1–2, C Whelan 0–4, C Ryan 0–3, S Ronayne 0–2, D Colleran 0–1.

26 July 2025 Round 3	Clonea	0–14 – 1–24	Ballygunner	Walsh Park
	B Power 0–7, F Roche 0–3, R O'Flynn 0–1, J Power 0–1, G Power 0–1, S Curry 0–1.		D Hutchinson 0–11, C Tobin 1–0, P Hogan 0–3, K Mahony 0–3, M Mahony 0–1, T Foley 0–1, P Leavey 0–1, M Hartley 0–1, E Cuddihy 0–1, E O'Brien 0–1, A O'Neill 0–1.

26 July 2025 Round 3	Abbeyside	4–16 – 3–19	Roanmore	Cappoquin Logistics Fraher Field
	C Treen 0–9, R Walsh 2–0, N Montgomery 1–0, C Prunty 1–0, M Power 0–3, M Kiely 0–2, E McInerney 0–1, D Walsh 0–1.		G O'Brien 0–9, B Everard 2–2, S Mackey 1–1, L Hearne 0–2, R Furling 0–1, C Ryan 0–1, B Nolan 0–1, S Burke 0–1, P O'Sullivan 0–1.

2 August 2025 Round 4	Abbeyside	0–13 – 1–23	Clonea	Cappoquin Logistics Fraher Field
	C Treen 0–7, M Power 0–2, C Prunty 0–1, W Beresford 0–1, M Twomey 0–1, D Walsh 0–1.		B Power 0–12, J Power 1–3, R Flynn 0–3, R Elliffe 0–2, R O'Mahony 0–1, F Roche 0–1, C Power 0–1.

3 August 2025 Round 4	Ballygunner	3–27 – 0–20	De La Salle	Walsh Park
	E Cuddihy 1–7, D Hutchinson 1–5, K Mahony 1–3, H Ruddle 0–3, M Mahony 0–2, C Sheehan 0–2, J Foley 0–1, M Hartley 0–1, T Foley 0–1, A O'Neill 0–1, P Hogan 0–1.		R Halloran 0–10, T Douglas 0–4, J Twomey 0–3, M Costigan 0–1, S O'Brien 0–1, K Moran 0–1.

3 August 2025 Round 4	Roanmore	0–22 – 0–19	Brickey Rangers	Cappoquin Logistics Fraher Field
	G O'Brien 0–13, L Hearne 0–2, P O'Sullivan 0–2, E Hayes 0–1, B Everard 0–1, O Hartney 0–1, Brian Nolan 0–1, Billy Nolan 0–1.		T O'Connell 0–12, C Curran 0–3, C Deevey 0–2, P Walsh 0–1, M Cummins 0–1.

9 August 2025 Round 5	Brickey Rangers	0–13 – 3–21	Abbeyside	Cappoquin Logistics Fraher Field
	C Curran (0–5; 0-1f); T O’Connell (0–5; 0-3f); C O’Grady, S Lennon and S Ronayne (0–1 each)	Report	M Kiely (2–1); C Treen (0–7; 0-3f); E Kiely (1–1); B O’Connell and E McInerney (0–3 each); D Collins and W Beresford (0–2 each); J Beresford and D Mackle (0–1 each)

9 August 2025 Round 5	De La Salle	1–22 – 1–09	Clonea	St Molleran's Park
	R Halloran 0–10 (8fs, 1 65), C Dawson, T Douglas 1–1 each, J Fagan, J Twomey, B Cunningham 0–2 each, D Lalor, C Keane, C McCann, K Moran, J Dillon 0–1 each.	Report	B Power 0–7 (4fs), F Roche 1–1 (1f), J Power 0–2, A Gleeson, R Elliffe 0–1 each.

9 August 2025 Round 5	Roanmore	0–15 – 3–24	Ballygunner	Walsh Park
	G O'Brien 0–7, D Reidy 0–3, C Wadding 0–2, S Burke 0–2, C Ryan 0–1		P Hogan 2–3, E Cuddihy 1–5, D Hutchinson 0–6, P Fitzgerald 0–2, M Hartley 0–2, K Mahony 0–2, R Power 0–1, M Mahony 0–1, J Foley 0–1.

== Knockout stage ==
=== Preliminary quarter-finals ===
16 August 2025 Pre-quarter-final	Passage	1–18 – 2–12	Brickey Rangers	Kill Grounds
	T Carey 0–11, R Jacob 1–0, M Fitzgerald 0–2, D Lynch 0–2, E Reilly 0–1, J Roche 0–1, M Cummins 0–1.	Report	T O'Connell 2–9, S Kearney 0–1, C Ryan 0–1, C Curran 0–1.

16 August 2025 Pre-quarter-final	Dungarvan	1–17 – 2–15	Clonea	Cappoquin Logistics Fraher Field
	P Curran 1–12, E Burke 0–2, J Lacey 0–1, C Curran 0–1, E O'Callaghan 0–1.	Report	J Power 2–1, B Power 0–7, R Flynn 0–2, S Curry 0–2, F Roche 0–1, C Power 0–1, M Power 0–1.

16 August 2025 Pre-quarter-final	Fourmilewater	0–27 – 3–15	Abbeyside	Cappoquin Logistics Fraher Field
	S Walsh 0–7, J Barron 0–6, A Ryan 0–3, C Walsh 0–3, E Spellman 0–2, O Walsh 0–2, P Walsh 0–1, T Barron 0–1, M Morrissey 0–1, T Guiry 0–1.	Report	M Kiely 2–5, C Treen 1–5, M Twomey 0–1, W Beresford 0–1, D Walsh 0–1, A Higgins 0–1, B O'Connell 0–1.

16 August 2025 Pre-quarter-final	De La Salle	0–22 – 0–09	Ferrybank	Walsh Park
	R Halloran 0–10, T Douglas 0–2, B Cunningham 0–2, K Moran 0–2, J Twomey 0–2, E Barrett 0–1, C Keane 0–1, D Lalor 0–1, C Dawson 0–1.	Report	M O'Brien 0–8, C Mac Cathmhaoil 0–1.

=== Relegation playoffs ===
23 August 2025 Semi-final	Dungarvan	1–21 – 0–21	Brickey Rangers	Cappoquin Grounds
	Cathal Curran 0-10, J Burke 1-1, Colm Curran 0-3, B Curran 0-3, D Hamilton 0-2, J Duggan 0-2.		T O'Connell 0-11, C Deevy 0-5, S Ronayne 0-2, C Ryan 0-2, C Curran 0-1.

24 August 2025 Semi-final	Abbeyside	1–17 – 1–14	Ferrybank	Páirc Naomh Bríd
	M Kiely 0-10, C Prunty 1-1, E Kiely 0-2, M O'Halloran 0-1, C Treen 0-1, C Kent 0-1, B O'Connell 0-1.		M O'Brien 0-10, R McGarrity 1-0, C Mac Cathmhaoil 0-2, L Flynn 0-1, N O'Sullivan 0-1.

31 August 2025 Final	Brickey Rangers	1–16 – 3–15	Ferrybank	Páirc Naomh Bríd
	T O'Connell 1-10, M Cummins 0-1, P Walsh 0-1, C Curran 0-1, S Lennon 0-1, S Ronayne 0-1, C Ryan 0-1.	Report	M O'Brien 0-7, R Carew 1-3, R McGarrity 1-1, N O'Sullivan 1-1, S Oates 0-2, C Haley 0-1.

=== Quarter-finals ===
23 August 2025 Quarter-final	Ballygunner	2–27 – 2–09	Passage	Walsh Park
	D Hutchinson 0–8 (4f), P Fitzgerald 1–2, H Ruddle 1–1, E Cuddihy 0–4, K Mahony 0–3, P Hogan 0–2, M Mahony 0–2, P Mahony 0–2 (2f), R Power 0–1, C Sheehan 0–1, C Tobin (0–1).	Report	T Carey 2–4 (1-4f), M Fitzgerald 0–3, R Jacob 0–1, G Cullinane 0–1.

23 August 2025 Quarter-final	Mount Sion	0–28 – 2–21 (aet)	Clonea	Walsh Park
	A Gleeson 0–9 (6fs, 1 sideline), M O'Neill 0–7 (6fs), J Kennedy, J Gleeson, S Roche, D Power 0–2 each, A Regan, L O'Brien, G Power, S O’Neill 0–1 each.	Report	F Roche 1–5 (3fs, 1 65), J Power 0–7, B Power 0–4 (3fs), R Flynn 1–0, K Power 0–2, G Power, A Gleeson, T Skehan 0–1 each.

24 August 2025 Quarter-final	Roanmore	2–20 – 1–21 (aet)	Fourmilewater	Walsh Park
	G O’Brien 0–13 (12fs), E Flynn 1–1, R Furlong 1–0, P O'Sullivan 0–2, D Reidy, B Nolan (f), S Mackey, O Hartney 0–1 each.	Report	J Barron 1–2, E Spelman 0–4 (3fs), S Walsh, T Guiry 0–3 each, C Walsh, O Walsh (2fs), A Ryan, M Morrissey 0–2 each, S Ryan 0–1.

24 August 2025 Quarter-final	Lismore	2–17 – 3–25	De La Salle	Walsh Park
	M Shanahan 0–8 (8fs), J Prendergast 2–1 (1–0 penalty, 1-0f), B O'Sullivan, C Lineen, P Prendergast 0–2 each, I Daly, J O'Keeffe 0–1 each.	Report	T Douglas 1–5, R Halloran 0–8 (3 65s, 3fs), J Twomey 0–5, A Farrell, K Moran 1–0 each, C McCann, S O'Brien (2fs) 0–2 each, J Fagan, C Dawson, T Moran 0–1 each.

=== Semi-finals ===
31 August 2025 Semi-final	Mount Sion	1–15 – 0–17	Roanmore	Walsh Park
	M O’Neill 0–10 (7f, 1 ’65), J Meaney 1–0, A Regan 0–2, S Roche 0–1, J Gleeson 0–1, A Gleeson 0–1	Report	G O’Brien 0–6 (5f, 1 ’65), B Everard 0–2, B Nolan 0–2, B Nolan 0–2, S Burke 0–1, P O’Sullivan 0–1, R Furlong 0–1, S Mackey 0–1, E Flynn 0–1.

31 August 2025 Semi-final	Ballygunner	2–16 – 1–13	De La Salle	Walsh Park
	D Hutchinson 2–2 (2f), P Mahony 0–5 (4f), K Mahony 0–3, P Leavey 0–2, P Fitzgerald 0–1, H Ruddle 0–1, P Hogan 0–1.	Report	R Halloran 0–7 (6f), B Cunningham 1–0, T Douglas 0–2, A Farrell 0–1, S O’Brien 0–1 (1f), C McCann 0–1, J Twomey 0–1.

=== Final ===
7 September 2025 Final	Mount Sion	1–16 – 2–35	Ballygunner	Walsh Park
	M O’Neill (0-4, frees); PJ Fanning, A Gleeson (2 sidelines), M O’Neill (frees) (0-3 each); Jack Meaney (1-0); S Roche, J Gleeson (0-2 each); J Kennedy, A Kirwan (0-1 each).	Report	P Mahony (0-11, 7 frees); D Hutchinson (1-6); P Fitzgerald (1-3); P Hogan, E Cuddihy, C Sheahan (0-3 each); R Power, C Tobin (0-2 each); H Ruddle, A O’Neill (0-1 each).	Referee: A Kissane (Dunhill)

== Championship statistics ==
=== Top scorers ===
Overall

Rank	Player	Club	Tally	Total	Matches	Average
1	Tom O'Connell	Brickey Rangers	4–68	80	8	10.00
2	Dessie Hutchinson	Ballygunner	7–57	78	8	9.75
3	Mark O'Brien	Ferrybank	0–71	71	8	8.87
4	Gavin O'Brien	Roanmore	1–65	68	7	9.71
5	Reuben Halloran	De La Salle	1–60	63	7	9.00
6	Martin O'Neill	Mount Sion	1–59	62	7	8.85
7	Tom Carey	Passage	4–44	56	7	8.00
8	Patrick Curran	Dungarvan	1–45	48	5	9.60
9	Bill Power	Clonea	0–46	46	6	7.66
10	Evan Spellman	Fourmilewater	0–43	43	7	6.14

In a single game

Rank	Player	Club	Tally	Total	Opposition
1	Dessie Hutchinson	Ballygunner	2–10	16	Brickey Rangers
2	Tom O'Connell	Brickey Rangers	2–09	15	Passage
2	Patrick Curran	Dungarvan	1–12	12	Clonea
4	Martin O'Neill	Mount Sion	1–11	14	Dungarvan
5	Reuben Halloran	De La Salle	1–10	13	Brickey Rangers
5	Tom O'Connell	Brickey Rangers	1–10	13	Ferrybank
5	Gavin O'Brien	Roanmore	0–13	13	Fourmilewater
5	Gavin O'Brien	Roanmore	0–13	13	Brickey Rangers
9	Dessie Hutchinson	Ballygunner	1–09	12	Abbeyside
9	Patrick Curran	Dungarvan	0–12	12	Passage
9	Bill Power	Clonea	0–12	12	Abbeyside
9	Tom O'Connell	Brickey Rangers	0–12	12	Roanmore
