= 2026 Waterford Premier Intermediate Hurling Championship =

Annual hurling competition season

- Dates: 3 July - 23 August 2026
- Teams: 8
- Sponsor: Cappoquin Logistics
- Champions: Clashmore–Kinsalebeg (1st title); James Comerford (captain); James O'Connor (manager)
- Runners-up: Brickey Rangers
- Relegated: Ballysaggart

Tournament statistics
- Matches played: 20
- Goals scored: 51 (2.55 per match)
- Points scored: 725 (36.25 per match)

The 2026 Waterford Premier Intermediate Hurling Championship was the third staging of the Waterford Premier Intermediate Hurling Championship since its establishment by the Waterford County Board in 2023. The draw for the group stage pairings was made on 9 February 2026. The championship ran from 3 July to 23 August 2026.

The final was played on 23 August 2025 at Cappoquin Logistics Fraher Field in Dungarvan, between Clashmore–Kinsalebeg and Brickey Rangers, in what was their first ever meeting in the final. Clashmore–Kinsalebeg won the match by 2–16 to 0–20 to claim their first ever championship title.

== Team changes ==
=== To Championship ===
Relegated from the Waterford Senior Hurling Championship

- Brickey Rangers

Promoted from the Waterford Intermediate Hurling Championship

- An Rinn

=== From Championship ===
Promoted to the Waterford Senior Hurling Championship

- Ballygunner

Relegated to the Waterford Intermediate Hurling Championship

- Mícheál Mac Craith

== Group A ==
=== Group A table ===
Semi-finalist Quarter-finalist Preliminary quarter-finalist

Team	Matches				Score			Pts
Team	Pld	W	D	L	For	Against	Diff	Pts
Brickey Rangers	3	3	0	0	71	51	20	6
Aff/Cappoquin/Tour	3	2	0	1	72	57	15	4
Shamrocks	3	1	0	2	50	74	-20	2
Clash–Kinsalebeg	3	0	0	3	49	60	-11	0

== Group B ==
=== Group B table ===
Semi-finalist Quarter-finalist Preliminary quarter-finalist

Team	Matches				Score			Pts
Team	Pld	W	D	L	For	Against	Diff	Pts
Portlaw	3	3	0	0	81	63	18	6
An Rinn	3	2	0	1	82	56	26	4
Ballysaggart	3	1	0	2	57	72	-15	2
Tallow	3	0	0	3	46	75	-29	0

== Knockout stage ==
=== Preliminary quarter-finals ===
1 August 2026 Pre. quarter-final	Ballysaggart	2-11 - 3-21	Clashmore–Kinsalebeg	Cappoquin Logistics Fraher Field

2 August 2026 Pre. quarter-final	Shamrocks	0-20 - 2-13	Tallow	Cappoquin Sportsfield

=== Relegation final ===
15 August 2026 Final	Tallow	1-32 - 0-12	Ballysaggart	Cappoquin Logistics Fraher Field

=== Quarter-finals ===
8 August 2026 Quarter-final	An Rinn	1-16 - 1-23	Clashmore–Kinsalebeg	Cappoquin Logistics Fraher Field

9 August 2026 Quarter-final	Affane/Cappoquin/Tourin	1-29 - 2-25	Shamrocks	Castle Grounds

=== Semi-finals ===
15 August 2026 Semi-final	Portlaw	1-13 - 0-23	Clashmore–Kinsalebeg	Cappoquin Logistics Fraher Field
	E Burrows 0-5, P Walsh 1-1, DJ Foran 0-2, C Rooney 0-2, C Shankey 0-1, J Power 0-1, C Foley 0-1.		P O'Connor 0-7, B O'Halloran 0-4, B Lynch 0-3, D Ryan 0-3, L Coughlan 0-3, A Trihy 0-1, J Fitzgerald 0-1, R Fitzgerald 0-1.

16 August 2026 Semi-final	Brickey Rangers	1-24 - 1-18	Affane/Cappoquin/Tourin	Cappoquin Logistics Fraher Field
	T O'Connell 0-6, S Ronayne 0-6, C Deevy 1-2, C O'Grady 0-4, P Cummins 0-4, C Keane 0-1, C Whelan 0-1.		E Murray 0-13, K O'Sullivan 1-1, M Buckley 0-2, T McCarthy 0-1, J Twomey 0-1.

=== Final ===
23 August 2026 Final	Clashmore–Kinsalebeg	2-16 - 0-20	Brickey Rangers	Cappoquin Logistics Fraher Field
	Brian Lynch (0-4); Ronan Fitzgerald and Luke Coughlan (1-0 each); Darragh Ryan and Tadhg De Burca (0-3; 0-3f each); Josh Fitzgerald (0-2); Ed O’Halloran, Brian O’Halloran, A Trihy and S Coughlan (0-1 each)	Report	T O’Connell (0-9; 0-7f); C O’Grady and C Deevy (0-3 each); S Lennon, C Keane, C Curran, P Cummins and D O’Grady (0-1 each)
