= 2024 Waterford Premier Intermediate Hurling Championship =

Annual hurling competition season

- Dates: 19 July - 31 August 2024
- Teams: 8
- Sponsor: Cappoquin Logistics
- Champions: Brickey Rangers (1st title); Oran Keevers (captain)
- Runners-up: Clashmore–Kinsalebeg
- Relegated: Dunhill

Tournament statistics
- Matches played: 22
- Goals scored: 79 (3.59 per match)
- Points scored: 776 (35.27 per match)

The 2024 Waterford Premier Intermediate Hurling Championship was the second staging of the Waterford Premier Intermediate Hurling Championship since its establishment by the Waterford County Board in 2023. The championship ran from 19 July to 31 August 2024.

The final was played on 1 September 2024 at Fraher Field in Dungarvan, between Brickey Rangers and Clashmore–Kinsalebeg, in what was their first ever meeting in the final. Brickey Rangers won the match by 1–23 to 0–22 to claim their first ever championship title.

== Team changes ==
=== To Championship ===
Relegated from the Waterford Senior Hurling Championship

- Dunhill

Promoted from the Waterford Intermediate Hurling Championship

- Brickey Rangers

=== From Championship ===
Promoted to the Waterford Senior Hurling Championship

- Ferrybank

Relegated to the Waterford Intermediate Hurling Championship

- Ballyduff Lower

== Group A ==
=== Group A table ===
Team	Matches				Score			Pts
Team	Pld	W	D	L	For	Against	Diff	Pts
Ballysaggart	3	3	0	0	100	55	45	6
Ballygunner	3	2	0	1	92	65	27	4
Shamrocks	3	1	0	2	62	85	-23	2
Dunhill	3	0	0	3	38	87	-49	0

=== Group A results ===
20 July 2024 Round 1	Dunhill	1-10 - 5-14	Ballysaggart	Páirc Naomh Bríd
	J Groves 0-8, A Foran 1-0, E Casey 0-1, A Greene 0-1.		Shane Bennett 3-3, Stephen Bennett 1-5, K Bennett 1-2, C O'Gorman 0-2, K Bennett 0-2.

20 July 2024 Round 1	Shamrocks	1-14 - 3-28	Ballygunner	Fraher Field
	P Hynes 0-8, S Roche 1-1, C Murphy 0-2, T Dalton 0-2, E Lenehan 0-1.		C Tobin 1-6, C Hartley 1-4, B O'Keeffe 0-7, J Foley 0-6, E Cuddihy 1-2, G Corbett 0-1, E O'Brien 0-1, T Spain 0-1.

27 July 2024 Round 2	Dunhill	0-15 - 3-18	Shamrocks	Páirc Naomh Bríd

28 July 2024 Round 2	Ballygunner	2-18 - 5-23	Ballysaggart	Fraher Field
			Stephen Bennett 3-9, Shane Bennett 1-4, Kieran Bennett 1-3, Kyle Bennett 0-2, S Nugent 0-2, C O'Gorman 0-1, J Ryan 0-1, R Bennett 0-1.

3 August 2024 Round 3	Dunhill	0-10 - 2-25	Ballygunner	Kill GAA Field

3 August 2024 Round 3	Shamrocks	1-15 - 4-21	Ballysaggart	Fraher Field
	P Hynes 1-5, T Dalton 0-4.

== Group B ==
=== Group B table ===
Team	Matches				Score			Pts
Team	Pld	W	D	L	For	Against	Diff	Pts
Brickey Rangers	3	2	1	0	92	62	30	5
Clashmore–Kinsalebeg	3	2	1	0	80	59	21	5
Cappoquin	3	1	0	2	65	65	0	2
Micheál Mac Craith	3	0	0	2	44	95	-51	0

=== Group B results ===
19 July 2024 Round 1	Brickey Rangers	2-20 - 2-20	Clashmore–Kinsalebeg	Cappoquin Sportsfield
	T O'Connell 0-8, C Deevy 2-0, C Whelan 0-4, P Cummins 0-3, S Lennon 0-2, S Ronayne 0-2, C O'Grady 0-1.		P O'Connor 0-8, J Fitzgerald 2-0, T de Burca 0-6, B Lynch 0-2, J Scanlon 0-1, B O'Halloran 0-1, S Fitzgerald 0-1, A Trihy 0-1.

20 July 2024 Round 1	Cappoquin	1-21 - 0-16	Micheál Mac Craith, Tramore	Páirc Naomh Bríd
	S O'Rourke 0-6, A O'Sullivan 0-5, K O'Sullivan 1-1, A Molumby 0-4, T McCarthy 0-2, P Murray 0-2.		I Thompson 0-6, D Morrissey 0-2, D Cantwell 0-2, J Clancy 0-2, S Lenehan 0-2, C Butler 0-1, E Quinlan 0-1.

26 July 2024 Round 2	Brickey Rangers	2-20 - 2-15	Cappoquin	Fraher Field

27 July 2024 Round 2	Micheál Mac Craith, Tramore	1-10 - 3-22	Clashmore–Kinsalebeg	Páirc Naomh Bríd

3 August 2024 Round 3	Cappoquin	2-14 - 2-17	Clashmore–Kinsalebeg	Fraher Field

4 August 2024 Round 3	Brickey Rangers	5-25 - 2-09	Micheál Mac Craith, Tramore	Fraher Field

== Knockout stage ==
=== Quarter-finals ===
16 August 2024 Quarter-final	Dunhill	1-12 - 5-30	Brickey Rangers	Páirc Naomh Bríd

17 August 2024 Quarter-final	Ballygunner	1-17 - 2-12	Cappoquin	Pairc Chuileagáin/Na hEmmetigh

17 August 2024 Quarter-final	Ballysaggart	2-16 - 1-13	Micheál Mac Craith	Bushy Park

18 August 2024 Quarter-final	Shamrocks	2-13 - 1-20	Clashmore–Kinsalebeg	Fraher Field

=== Relegation playoffs ===
24 August 2024 Semi-final	Micheál Mac Craith	4-18 - 1-18	Shamrocks	Bushy Park

25 August 2024 Semi-final	Cappoquin	3-26 - 0-10	Dunhill	Páirc Naomh Bríd

31 August 2024 Final	Shamrocks	2-13 - 0-14	Dunhill	Páirc Naomh Bríd

=== Semi-finals ===
24 August 2024 Semi-final	Ballysaggart	0-17 - 1-20	Clashmore–Kinsalebeg	Fraher Field

24 August 2024 Semi-final	Brickey Rangers	0-23 - 1-19	Ballygunner	Páirc Naomh Bríd

=== Final ===
31 August 2024 Final	Brickey Rangers	1-23 - 0-22	Clashmore–Kinsalebeg	Fraher Field
	T O’Connell 0-8 (4fs), C Deevy 1-2, S Ronayne 0-4, C Whelan, P Cummins 0-2 each, C Ryan, C O’Grady, S Lennon, B Cullinane, D Kelly 0-1 each.		B O’Halloran, T De Burca (5fs) 0-5 each, P O’Connor 0-4 (4fs), S Fitzgerald, E O’Halloran 0-2 each, D Allen, A Trihy, R Fitzgerald, B Lynch 0-1 each.	Referee: S Walsh
