= 2024 Waterford Senior Hurling Championship =

Annual hurling competition season

- Dates: 19 July – 1 September 2024
- Teams: 12
- Sponsor: JJ Kavanagh and Sons
- Champions: Ballygunner (23rd title); Conor Sheahan (captain); Pauric Mahony (captain); Darragh O'Sullivan (manager)
- Runners-up: Abbeyside; Michael Kiely (captain); Benji Whelan (manager)
- Relegated: Tallow

Tournament statistics
- Matches played: 26
- Goals scored: 58 (2.23 per match)
- Points scored: 900 (34.62 per match)
- Top scorer(s): Pauric Mahony (1–48)

The 2024 Waterford Senior Hurling Championship was the 124th staging of the Waterford Senior Hurling Championship since its establishment by the Waterford County Board in 1897. The draws for the group stage pairings was made on 29 January 2024. The championship is scheduled to run from 19 July to September 2024.

Ballygunner entered the championship as the defending champions. Tallow were relegated after losing a playoff to Clonea.

The final was played on 1 September 2024 at Fraher Field in Dungarvan, between Ballygunner and Abbeyside, in what was their second meeting in the final overall and a first meeting in six years. Ballygunner won the match by 2–28 to 2–10 to claim their 23rd championship title overall and a record-extending 11th title in succession.

Ballygunner's Pauric Mahony was the championship's top scorer with 1–48.

== Team changes ==
=== To Championship ===
Promoted from the Waterford Premier Intermediate Hurling Championship

- Ferrybank

=== From Championship ===
Relegated to the Waterford Premier Intermediate Hurling Championship

- Dunhill

== Group A ==
=== Group A table ===
Advance to quarter-finals Advance to preliminary quarter-finals

Team	Matches				Score			Pts
Team	Pld	W	D	L	For	Against	Diff	Pts
Roanmore	2	2	0	0	62	31	31	4
Clonea	2	1	0	1	55	36	19	2
Tallow	2	0	0	2	20	70	−50	0

=== Group A results ===
19 July 2024 Round 1	Clonea	4–22 – 1–07	Tallow	Fraher Field
	J Gleeson 2–8 (5fs), B Power 0–7 (3fs, 1 65), G Power 1–3, F Roche 1–2, K Power 0–2.	Report	D Buckley 0–4 (3fs), S Murphy 1–0, M Stewart 0–2, T Ryan 0–1.

26 July 2024 Round 2	Roanmore	2–20 – 0–21	Clonea	Walsh Park
	G O’Brien 0–11 (9Fs), S Mackey 2–0, S Burke 0–3, R Furlong, S Pender, L Hearne, J Sheridan, B Nolan and P O’Sullivan 0–1 each.	Report	J Gleeson 0–8 (7Fs), B Power 0–7 (5Fs), K Power 0–3, G Power 0–2, C Power 0–1.

2 August 2024 Round 3	Roanmore	2–30 – 0–10	Tallow	Fraher Field
	G O’Brien 0–12 (8fs), P O’Sullivan 1–4, C Ryan 0–4, L Hearne 1–0, S Pender 0–3, S Burke, C Carroll (1f) 0–2 each, R Furlong, B Nolan, I Chester 0–1 each.	Report	D Buckley 0–5 (3fs, 1 65), T Ryan 0–2, C McCarthy, I Beecher, S Murphy 0–1 each.

== Group B ==
=== Group B table ===
Advance to quarter-finals Advance to preliminary quarter-finals

Team	Matches				Score			Pts
Team	Pld	W	D	L	For	Against	Diff	Pts
Mount Sion	2	2	0	0	47	42	5	4
De La Salle	2	1	0	1	41	41	0	2
Passage	2	0	0	2	38	43	−5	0

=== Group B results ===
20 July 2024 Round 1	Mount Sion	1–21 – 1–17	Passage	Walsh Park
	A Gleeson 1–10 (Fs), A Regan 0–4, J Gleeson and M O’Neill 0–2 each, D Power, A Kirwan, PJ Fanning 0–1 each.	Report	T Carey 0–9 (8FS), M Cummins 1–4 (1–1 Fs), L Flynn 0–2, K Cullinane and O Connors 0–1 each.

28 July 2024 Round 2	De La Salle	2–16 – 2–17	Mount Sion	Walsh Park
	R Halloran 1–8 (7fs), E Meaney 1–0, J Twomey 0–3, L Dwyer, C Dawson, E Barrett, J Fagan, T Douglas 0–1 each.	Report	A Gleeson 1–11 (1-8fs, 1 sideline), A Regan 1–0, Martin O’Neill 0–2, PJ Fanning, Martin F O’Neill, J Kennedy, D Power 0–1 each.

2 August 2024 Round 3	De La Salle	1–16 – 0–18	Passage	Walsh Park
	R Halloran 0–8 (7Fs), E Meaney 1–1, B Cunningham, E Barrett and T Douglas 0–2 each, C Morris 0–1.	Report	T Carey 0–6 (4Fs), G Cullinane 0–4(2Fs), S Kelly 0–3, E Reilly 0–2, C Drohan, D Lynch and O Connors 0–1 each.

== Group C ==
=== Group C table ===
Advance to quarter-finals Advance to preliminary quarter-finals

Team	Matches				Score			Pts
Team	Pld	W	D	L	For	Against	Diff	Pts
Ballygunner	2	2	0	0	59	32	27	4
Lismore	2	1	0	1	45	43	2	2
Dungarvan	2	0	0	2	35	64	−29	0

=== Group C results ===
20 July 2024 Round 1	Dungarvan	1–18 – 3–18	Lismore	Fraher Field
	M Kiely 0–7, C Curran 0–4, P Curran 0–2, J Duggan 0–1, S Crotty 0–1, E O'Callaghan 0–1, C Curran 0–1, E Burke 0–1.	Report	M Shanahan 1–6, B O'Sullivan 1–1, R Barry 1–0, C Lineen 0–3, F Reaney 0–2, O O'Gorman 0–2, J O'Keeffe 0–2, T Duffin 0–1, J Prendergast 0–1.

27 July 2024 Round 2	Ballygunner	5–22 – 2–08	Dungarvan	Fraher Field
	Pauric Mahony 0–9 (4fs), C Tobin 2–1, C Power 1–4, K Mahony 1–3, A O'Neill 1–1, C Sheahan 0–2, P Leavy (f), I Kenny 0–1 each.	Report	M Kiely 2–6 (4fs, 1 65), C Curran, P Curran 0–1 each.

4 August 2024 Round 3	Ballygunner	1–19 – 3–09	Lismore	Fraher Field
	Pauric Mahony 0–10 (5Fs, 1’65’), K Mahony 1–1, P Fitzgerald 0–4 (1F), J Foley, C Sheahan, C Tobin, P Hogan 0–1 each.	Report	B O’Sullivan 3–0, M Shanahan 0–7 (6Fs), F Reaney and J Shanahan 0–1 each.

== Group D ==
=== Group D table ===
Advance to quarter-finals Advance to preliminary quarter-finals

Team	Matches				Score			Pts
Team	Pld	W	D	L	For	Against	Diff	Pts
Abbeyside	2	2	0	0	54	31	23	4
Fourmilewater	2	1	0	1	38	40	−2	2
Ferrybank	2	0	0	2	36	57	−21	0

=== Group D results ===
20 July 2024 Round 1	Abbeyside	3–22 – 2–13	Ferrybank	Walsh Park
	M O’Halloran 0–11(8Fs), M Kiely 2–5, C Treen 1–0, W Beresford 0–2, C Prunty, R Walsh, E McInerney and M Power 0–1 each.	Report	M O’Brien 1–8 (0-5FS, 0–1 ‘65’), I Richards 1–0, N O’Sullivan 0–2, R McGarrity, D Griffin and R Carew 0–1 each.

27 July 2024 Round 2	Fourmilewater	0–12 – 0–23	Abbeyside	Fraher Field
	A Ryan 0–5 (2’65’s,2Fs), S Walsh, J Barron, M Morrissey, P Walsh, E Spellman, C Walsh and B Byrne 0–1 each.	Report	M O’Halloran 0–11 (Fs), C Treen 0–5, M Kiely and R Walsh 0–3 each, C Prunty 0–1.

3 August 2024 Round 3	Fourmilewater	2–20 – 0–17	Ferrybank	Páirc Dún Garbháin
	A Ryan 0–11 (2fs, 1 65), M Morrissey, S Walsh 1–2 each, D Ryan, C Walsh 0–2 each, J Barron 0–1.	Report	M O’Brien 0–8 (7fs), R McGarrity, N O’Sullivan 0–3 each, C Mac Cathmhaoil 0–2, MJ Sutton 0–1.

== Knockout stage ==
=== Preliminary quarter-finals ===
9 August 2024 Pre. quarter-final	De La Salle	1–28 – 1–13	Tallow	Páirc Éamonn de Paor
	R Halloran 0–10 (7fs, 1 65), E Meaney 1–1, J Fagan, J Twomey, C Dawson 0–4 each, B Cunningham 0–2, T Douglas, C Morris, C Keane 0–1 each.	Report	T Ryan 0–6 (6fs), M Stewart 1–1, S Murphy 0–3, I Beecher 0–2, D Buckley 0–1.

10 August 2024 Pre. quarter-final	Clonea	1–24 – 2–23	Ferrybank	Ferrybank Grounds
	B Power 0–11 (5Fs), J Gleeson 1–4 (1-1Fs), C Dalton 0–3, K Power and A Murray 0–2 each, J Power and G Power 0–1 each.	Report	M O’Brien 0–13 (10Fs), R Carew 1–2, MJ Sutton 1–1, N O’Sullivan 0–3, R McGarrity 0–2, L Flynn and J Ahern 0–1 each.

10 August 2024 Pre. quarter-final	Fourmilewater	0–15 – 0–18	Dungarvan	Fraher Field
	E Spellman (3fs), J Barron (1f) 0–3 each, T Guiry, M Morrissey, A Ryan (1f) 0–2 each, O Walsh, B Byrne, S Walsh 0–1 each.	Report	M Kiely 0–9 (8fs, 1 65), C Curran 0–3 (1f), T Loftus, S Crotty 0–2 each, E O’Callaghan, P Curran 0–1 each.

10 August 2024 Pre. quarter-final	Lismore	1–15 – 0–20	Passage	Passage Grounds
	M Shanahan 0–7 (6Fs), P Prendergast 1–1, J O’Keeffe and B O’Sullivan 0–2 each, J Prendergast, F Reaney and R Barry 0–1 each.	Report	T Carey 0–6 (3Fs), M Fitzgerald and M Cummins 0–3 each, G Cullinane and O Connors 0–2 each, K Cullinane, D Lynch, S Kelly and S Lynch 0–1 each.

=== Relegation playoffs ===
16 August 2024 Semi-final	Tallow	0–10 – 0–22	Lismore	Fraher Field
	T Ryan 0–5, I Beecher 0–3, S Murphy 0–1, E Sheehan 0–1.	Report	M Shanahan 0–13, B O'Sullivan 0–3, P Prendergast 0–3, R Barry 0–1, F Reaney 0–1, J Lenihan 0–1.

17 August 2024 Semi-final	Clonea	2–16 – 2–18	Fourmilewater	Fraher Field
	B Power 0–7, J Gleeson 1–3, J Power 1–1, C Dalton 0–2, F Roche 0–2, A Murray 0–1.	Report	E Spellman 0–6, C Walsh 1–1, M Morrissey 1–1, S Walsh 0–3, J Barron 0–2, T Barron 0–2, D Ryan 0–2, P Walsh 0–1.

23 August 2024 Final	Tallow	1–15 – 1–23	Clonea	Fraher Field
	I Beecher 0–10 (7fs), M Stewart 1–2, Jordan Henley (f), M O'Brien, E Sheehan 0–1 each.	Report	J Gleeson 0–12 (7fs, 1 65), J Power 1–2, G Power 0–3, K Power, F Roche 0–2 each, R O'Mahony, S Curry 0–1 each.

=== Quarter-finals ===
16 August 2024 Quarter-final	Mount Sion	0–21 – 0–15	Ferrybank	Walsh Park
	A Gleeson 0–9 (5fs, 1 65), A Kirwan 0–4, J Gleeson, A Regan 0–2 each, J Meaney, PJ Fanning, J Kennedy, D Power 0–1 each.	Report	M O'Brien 0–10 (8fs, 1 65), R Carew 0–2, R McGarrity, N Mac Cathmhaoil, C Mac Cathmhaoil 0–1 each.

17 August 2024 Quarter-final	Dungarvan	0–15 – 2–19	Abbeyside	Fraher Field
	M Kiely 0–5 (3fs), P Curran 0–4, E O'Callaghan 0–3, Cathal Curran, T Loftus, D Lyons 0–1 each.	Report	M O' Halloran 0–10 (7fs), C Treen 1–4, E Kiely 1–1, M Kiely 0–2, M Power, W Beresford 0–1 each.

18 August 2024 Quarter-final	Roanmore	0–20 – 1–18	Passage	Walsh Park
	G O'Brien 0–10 (6fs, 2 65s), L Hearne 0–5, S Burke 0–2, C Wadding, Billy Nolan, R Furlong 0–1 each.	Report	T Carey 0–13 (11fs), M Fitzgerald 1–0, G Cullinane 0–2, D Lynch, S Lynch, S Kelly 0–1 each.

18 August 2024 Quarter-final	Ballygunner	2–21 – 0–21	De La Salle	Walsh Park
	Pauric Mahony 1–5 (4fs, 1–0 pen), K Mahony 1–4, D Hutchinson 0–6, P Fitzgerald 0–2, R Power, P Leavy, C Power, B O'Keeffe 0–1 each.	Report	R Halloran 0–10 (9fs), T Douglas 0–3, B Cunningham 0–2, J Dillon, L Dwyer, E Barrett, J Twomey, J Fagan, C Morris 0–1 each.

=== Semi-finals ===
25 August 2024 Semi-final	Abbeyside	3–20 – 0–19	Mount Sion	Walsh Park
	M O'Halloran 0–9 (6fs), M Kiely 2–2 (1–0 pen), C Treen 1–1, B O'Connell 0–3, R Walsh 0–2, C Prunty, W Beresford, E Kiely 0–1 each.	Report	A Gleeson 0–9 (9fs), A Kirwan 0–4, Martin O'Neill 0–2, L O'Brien, PJ Fanning, J Gleeson, J Kennedy 0–1 each.

25 August 2024 Semi-final	Ballygunner	0–22 – 0–13	Passage	Walsh Park
	Pauric Mahony 0–13 (8fs, 1 65), P Fitzgerald 0–3, D Hutchinson 0–2, C Sheahan, P Leavey, C Power, K Mahony 0–1 each.	Report	T Carey 0–8 (6fs, 1 65), G Cullinane, M Cummins, M Fitzgerald, E Reilly, S Kelly 0–1 each.

=== Final ===
1 September 2024 Final	Abbeyside	2–10 – 2–28	Ballygunner	Fraher Field
	M Kiely (2–1, 1–0 free); M O’Halloran (0–5, 4 frees, 1 65); C Treen (0–2); M Power, C Prunty (0–1 each)	Report	Pauric Mahony (0–11, 7 frees); D Hutchinson (1–4); C Sheahan (0–4); P Fitzgerald (1–1); K Mahony (0–3); R Power, S O’Keeffe, P Hogan, M Mahony, H Ruddle (0–1 each)	Referee: T Walsh (Modeligo)

== Championship statistics ==
=== Top scorers ===
Overall

Rank	Player	Club	Tally	Total	Matches	Average
1	Pauric Mahony	Ballygunner	1–48	51	5	10.20
2	Jason Gleeson	Clonea	4–35	47	5	9.40
3	Michael O'Halloran	Abbeyside	0–46	46	5	9.20
4	Austin Gleeson	Mount Sion	2–39	45	4	11.25
5	Thomas Carey	Passage	0–43	43	5	8.60
6	Mark O'Brien	Ferrybank	1–39	42	4	10.50
7	Reuben Halloran	De La Salle	1–36	39	4	9.75
8	Maurice Shanahan	Lismore	1–33	36	4	9.00
9	Michael Kiely	Dungarvan	2–27	33	4	8.25
9	Gavin O'Brien	Roanmore	0–33	33	3	11.00

In a single game

Rank	Player	Club	Tally	Total	Opposition
1	Jason Gleeson	Clonea	2-08	14	Tallow
1	Austin Gleeson	Mount Sion	1–11	14	De La Salle
3	Austin Gleeson	Mount Sion	1–10	13	Passage
3	Pauric Mahony	Ballygunner	0–13	13	Passage
3	Thomas Carey	Passage	0–13	13	Roanmore
3	Maurice Shanahan	Lismore	0–13	13	Tallow
3	Mark O'Brien	Ferrybank	0–13	13	Clonea
8	Michael Kiely	Dungarvan	2-06	12	Ballygunner
8	Jason Gleeson	Clonea	0–12	12	Tallow
8	Gavin O'Brien	Roanmore	0–12	12	Tallow
