= Waterford Premier Intermediate Hurling Championship =

Annual hurling competition for intermediate clubs in Waterford

- Current season or competition: 2026 Waterford Premier Intermediate Hurling Championship
- Irish: Craobh Príomh-Idirmheánach Iomaint Phort Láirge
- Code: Hurling
- Founded: 2023; 3 years ago
- Region: Waterford (GAA)
- Trophy: Pat Hunt Cup
- No. of teams: 8
- Title holders: Clashmore–Kinsalebeg (1st title)
- Sponsors: Cappoquin Logistics
- Official website: Waterford GAA

The Waterford Premier Intermediate Hurling Championship (abbreviated to the Waterford PIHC) is an annual hurling competition organised by the Waterford County Board of the Gaelic Athletic Association and contested by the top-ranking intermediate clubs in the county of Waterford in Ireland. It is the second tier overall in the entire Waterford hurling championship system.

The Waterford Premier Intermediate Championship was introduced in 2023 following a restructuring of the intermediate championship.

In its current format, the championship begins in mid summer. The eight participating teams are drawn into two groups of four teams and play each other in a round-robin system. All eight teams proceed to the knockout phase that culminates with the final match at either Walsh Park or Fraher Field. The winner of the Waterford Premier Intermediate Championship qualifies for the subsequent Munster Club Championship.

Clashmore–Kinsalebeg are the title holders after defeating Brickey Rangers by 2–16 to 0–20 in the 2026 final.

== History ==
On 31 January 2022, Waterford County Board delegates voted on the restructuring of the entire intermediate hurling championship system following a review process. It was decided to establish an all-county eight-team premier intermediate hurling championship for 2023. These eight teams were made up of the four semi-finalists from the 2022 Eastern and Western intermediate championships.

== Format ==
=== Group stage ===
The eight teams are divided into two groups of four. Over the course of the group stage, each team plays once against the others in the group, resulting in each team being guaranteed three games. Two points are awarded for a win, one for a draw and zero for a loss. The teams are ranked in the group stage table by points gained, then scoring difference and then their head-to-head record. All four teams in each group qualify for the knockout stage but are seeded.

=== Knockout stage ===
Quarter-finals: This round features four matches. The four winning teams advance to the semi-finals. The four losing teams advance to the relegation playoffs.

Semi-finals: The four quarter-final winners contest this round. The two winners from these games advance to the final.

Final: The two semi-final winners contest the final. The winning team are declared champions.

=== Promotion and relegation ===
At the end of the championship, the winning team is automatically promoted to the Waterford Senior Championship for the following season. The four defeated teams from the quarter-final stage participate in a series of playoffs, with the losing team being relegated to the Waterford Intermediate Championship.

== Teams ==
=== 2026 teams ===
The following 8 teams contested the 2026 Waterford Premier Intermediate Hurling Championship:

Team	Location	Division	Colours	Position in 2025	In championship since	Championship titles	Last championship title
Ballysaggart	Ballysaggart	West	Blue and navy	Semi-finals	2023	0	—
Brickey Rangers	Dungarvan	West	Amber and black	Waterford SHC	2026	1	2024
Cappoquin	Cappoquin	West	Red and black	Semi-finals	2023	0	—
Clashmore–Kinsalebeg	Clashmore	West	Red and green	Quarter-finals	2023	0	—
Portlaw	Portlaw	East	Blue and yellow	Preliminary quarter-finals	2025	0	—
Shamrocks	Knockanore	West	Green and white	Quarter-finals	2023	0	—
Tallow	Tallow	West	Blue and gold	Runners-up	2025	0	—
An Rinn	Ring	West	Blue and gold	Waterford IHC	2026	0	—

== Qualification for subsequent competitions ==
The Waterford Premier Intermediate Championship winners qualify for the subsequent Munster Intermediate Club Hurling Championship.

== Trophy and medals ==
The Pat Hunt Cup is the current prize for winning the championship. It was commissioned to honour Pat Hunt, who died in 2021, and served as chairman of the Clonea club and served as county board children's officer. Robbie Carew of Ferrybank was the first recipient of the cup when it was presented to him after the 2023 final.

In accordance with GAA rules, the County Board awards a set of gold medals to the championship winners. The medals depict a stylised version of the Waterford GAA crest.

== List of Finals ==
=== Legend ===
- Gold – Munster intermediate club champions
- Silver – Munster intermediate club runners-up

=== List of Waterford PIHC finals ===
Year	Winners		Runners-up		Captain	Venue	#
Year	Club	Score	Club	Score	Captain	Venue	#
2026	Clashmore–Kinsalebeg	2-16	Brickey Rangers	0-20		Fraher Field	
2025	Ballygunner	1–21	Tallow	2–11	Gavin Corbett	Walsh Park	
2024	Brickey Rangers	1–23	Clashmore–Kinsalebeg	0–22	Oran Keevers	Fraher Field	
2023	Ferrybank	2–22	Cappoquin	1–14	Robbie Carew	Walsh Park	

== Roll of honour ==
=== By club ===
#	Club	Titles	Runners-up	Championships won	Championships runner-up
1	Brickey Rangers	1	1	2024	2026
1	Clashmore–Kinsalebeg	1	1	2026	2024
1	Ferrybank	1	0	2023	—
1	Ballygunner	1	0	2025	—
2	Affane Cappoquin	0	1	—	2023
2	Tallow	0	1	—	2025

=== By division ===
#	Division	Titles	Runners-up	Total	Most recent title
1	West	2	4	6	2026
2	East	2	0	2	2025

== See also ==
- Waterford Senior Hurling Championship (Tier 1)
- Waterford Intermediate Hurling Championship (Tier 3)
- Waterford Junior A Hurling Championship (Tier 4)
- Waterford Junior B Hurling Championship (Tier 5)
- Waterford Junior C Hurling Championship (Tier 6)
