= 2023 Waterford Premier Intermediate Hurling Championship =

Annual hurling competition season

- Dates: 28 July - 9 September 2023
- Teams: 8
- Champions: Ferrybank (1st title); Robbie Carew (captain)
- Runners-up: Cappoquin; David Cahillane (captain); Shane Fives (captain)
- Relegated: Ballyduff Lower

Tournament statistics
- Matches played: 22
- Goals scored: 52 (2.36 per match)
- Points scored: 689 (31.32 per match)

The 2023 Waterford Premier Intermediate Hurling Championship was the inaugural staging of the Waterford Premier Intermediate Hurling Championship since its establishment by the Waterford County Board. The draw for the group stage placing took place on 7 February 2023. The championship ran from 28 July to 9 September 2023.

The final was played on 9 September 2023 at Walsh Park in Waterford, between Ferrybank and Cappoquin, in what was their first ever meeting in the final. Ferrybank won the match by 2–22 to 1–14 to claim their first ever championship title overall.

== Group A ==
=== Group A table ===
Team	Matches				Score			Pts
Team	Pld	W	D	L	For	Against	Diff	Pts
Ballygunner	3	3	0	0	76	42	34	6
Clashmore–Kinsalebeg	3	2	0	1	63	58	5	4
Ferrybank	3	1	0	2	64	54	10	2
Ballysaggart	3	0	0	3	42	91	-49	0

=== Group A results ===
29 July 2023 Round 1	Clashmore–Kinsalebeg	3-19 - 2-12	Ballysaggart	Fraher Field

30 July 2023 Round 1	Ferrybank	2-12 - 0-19	Ballygunner	Kill Grounds

4 August 2023 Round 2	Ferrybank	2-13 - 2-16	Clashmore–Kinsalebeg	Páirc Naomh Bríd

5 August 2023 Round 2	Ballygunner	2-30 - 0-11	Ballysaggart	Fraher Field

11 August 2023 Round 3	Ferrybank	3-18 - 0-13	Ballysaggart	Páirc Dhún Garbháin

12 August 2023 Round 3	Ballygunner	2-15 - 1-10	Clashmore–Kinsalebeg	Páirc Naomh Bríd

== Group B ==
=== Group B table ===
Team	Matches				Score			Pts
Team	Pld	W	D	L	For	Against	Diff	Pts
Cappoquin	3	3	0	0	77	44	33	6
Micheál Mac Craith	3	2	0	1	57	53	4	4
Shamrocks	3	1	0	2	54	54	0	2
Ballyduff Upper	3	0	0	3	37	74	-37	0

=== Group B results ===
28 July 2023 Round 1	Cappoquin	2-16 - 1-13	Shamrocks	Castle Grounds

29 July 2023 Round 1	Micheál Mac Craith, Tramore	0-20 - 1-11	Ballyduff Lower	Kill Grounds

4 August 2023 Round 2	Ballyduff Lower	0-13 - 1-19	Shamrocks	Stradbally Grounds

5 August 2023 Round 2	Micheál Mac Craith, Tramore	0-18 - 0-23	Cappoquin	Páirc Naomh Bríd

12 August 2023 Round 3	Micheál Mac Craith, Tramore	0-19 - 0-16	Shamrocks	Fraher Field

12 August 2023 Round 3	Ballyduff Lower	0-10 - 3-23	Cappoquin	Páirc Naomh Bríd

== Knockout stage ==
=== Quarter-finals ===
25 August 2023 Quarter-final	Ballygunner	1-18 - 0-13	Ballyduff Lower	St Molleran's Grounds

25 August 2023 Quarter-final	Clashmore–Kinsalebeg	0-14 - 0-17	Shamrocks	Fraher Field
	P O'Connor 0-7, E O'Halloran 0-3, S Fitzgerald 0-2, B O'Halloran 0-1, B Lombard 0-1.		P Hynes 0-9, C Roche 0-4, E Lenehan 0-1, B Hynes 0-1, K Crawford 0-1, T Dalton 0-1.

25 August 2023 Quarter-final	Micheál Mac Craith, Tramore	0-15 - 1-16	Ferrybank	SETU Arena
	I Thompson 0-5, D Mulcahy 0-3, B Whelan 0-3, C Rellis 0-2, M Thompson 0-1, D Morrissey 0-1.		M O'Brien 0-8, D Griffin 1-1, N O'Sullivan 0-3, R McGarrity 0-1, S Lawless 0-1, L Flynn 0-1, R Tierney 0-1.

26 August 2023 Quarter-final	Cappoquin	5-20 - 2-11	Ballysaggart	Fraher Field

=== Relegation playoffs ===
2 September 2023 Semi-final	Clashmore–Kinsalebeg	2-16 - 0-15	Ballyduff Lower	Páirc Naomh Bríd

2 September 2023 Semi-final	Ballysaggart	3-11 - 0-22	Micheál Mac Craith, Tramore	Páirc Dhún Garbháin

8 September 2023 Final	Ballysaggart	2-18 - 2-12	Ballyduff Lower	Fraher Field

=== Semi-finals ===
2 September 2023 Semi-final	Ferrybank	1-23 - 1-20 (aet)	Shamrocks	Fraher Field
	M O'Brien 0-13, R McGarrity 1-0, N O'Sullivan 0-3, R Tierney 0-2, S Burtchaell 0-1, D Ahern 0-1, S Lawless 0-1, R Carew 0-1, D Griffin 0-1.		P Hynes 0-13, E Lonergan 1-1, C Roche 0-4, S Lucey 0-1, T Dalton 0-1.

3 September 2023 Semi-final	Ballygunner	1-14 - 1-20	Cappoquin	Fraher Field
	C Power 1-5, E Cuddihy 0-4, G Corbett 0-3, B O'Sullivan 0-1, L Horgan 0-1.		E Murray 0-10, A Molumby 0-4, A O'Sullivan 1-0, G Fives 0-3, T McCarthy 0-1, S Murray 0-1, M O'Brien 0-1.

=== Final ===
9 September 2023 Final	Ferrybank	2-26 - 1-14	Cappoquin	Walsh Park
	M O'Brien 1-14 (8fs, 1 pen, 1 65), MJ Sutton 1-1, R McGarrity 0-4, D Griffin, L Flynn, N O'Sullivan 0-1 each.		E Murray 0-8 (3fs, 1 65), G Fives 1-2, A Molumby, A O'Sullivan, T McCarthy, F Murray 0-1 each.	Referee: S Walsh
