= Tadhg de Búrca =

Irish hurler

The Tadgher
Personal information
- Native name: Tadhg de Búrca (Irish)
- Born: Tadhg Bourke; 19 September 1994 (age 32) Clashmore, County Waterford, Ireland
- Occupation: Secondary school teacher
- Height: 6 ft 1 in (185 cm)

Sport
- Sport: Hurling
- Position: Centre-back
Club
- Years: Club
- 2010-present: Clashmore–Kinsalebeg
Club titles
- Waterford titles: 0
College(s)
- Years: College
- 2013-2016 2016-2018: University College Cork; University College Dublin
College titles
- Fitzgibbon titles: 0
Inter-county*
Years	County	Apps (scores)
2014-present	Waterford	27 (0-09)
Inter-county titles
- Munster titles: 0
- All-Irelands: 0
- NHL: 1
- All Stars: 2
- *Inter County team apps and scores correct as of 15:46, 29 November 2020.

Tadhg de Búrca (born 19 September 1994), sometimes referred to as The Tadhger, is an Irish hurler who plays for Waterford Intermediate Championship club Clashmore–Kinsalebeg and at inter-county level with the Waterford senior hurling team. He usually lines out as a centre-back having previously enjoyed a role as a sweeper.

== Playing career ==
=== St. Augustine's College ===
de Búrca first came to prominence as a hurler and Gaelic footballer with St. Augustine's College in Dungarvan. He played in every grade before eventually joining the college's senior teams. On 30 March 2013, de Búrca was at centre-forward when St. Augustine's College faced Scoil Mhuire in the All-Ireland final. He scored 0-03, including a free, in the 2–08 to 0–10 victory.

=== Coláiste na nDéise ===
During the 2011-12 Harty Cup, de Búrca was selected for the Dungarvan-based Coláiste na nDéise combination. On 25 February 2012, he won a Harty Cup medal after lining out at left wing-back in a 2–14 to 1–10 defeat of Nenagh CBS.

de Búrca was again selected for the renamed Dungarvan Colleges side for the 2012-13 Harty Cup campaign. He won a second successive Harty Cup medal on 24 February 2013 after scoring 0-03 from right wing-back in a 2–21 to 1–11 defeat of Our Lady's Secondary School from Templemore. de Búrca was switched to left wing-back for the All-Ireland final against Kilkenny CBS on 6 April and collected a winners' medal following the 1–12 to 1–07 victory.

=== University College Cork ===
de Búrca completed a Bachelor of Arts at University College Cork between 2013 and 2016 and joined the senior hurling team in his second year. He was a regular player at centre-back in the Fitzgibbon Cup campaigns in 2015 and 2016.

=== University College Dublin ===
de Búrca transferred to University College Dublin to complete his two-year Professional Master of Education in 2016. He immediately joined the senior hurling team and made a number of appearances in the Fitzgibbon Cup campaigns in 2017 and 2018.

=== Clashmore–Kinsalebeg ===
de Búrca joined the Clashmore–Kinsalebeg club at a young age and played in all grades at juvenile and underage levels. On 20 May 2009, he lined out at left corner-back when Clashmore defeated Ballinacourty by 1–07 to 1–06 to win the Waterford Minor Football Championship.

On 30 September 2018, de Búrca lined out at centre-back for Clashmore when they qualified for the Western Intermediate Hurling Championship final. A 4–15 to 3–15 defeat of Ballysaggart secured a first ever title for the club.

=== Waterford ===
==== Minor and under-21 ====
de Búrca first lined out for Waterford as a member of the minor football team during the 2011 Munster Championship. He made his first appearance on 13 April and score two points from frees in a 4–16 to 0–06 defeat by Kerry.

de Búrca became a dual player at minor level during the 2012 Munster Championships. While his minor football season ended with a 1–14 to 1–03 defeat by Kerry on 17 April, de Búrca made his minor hurling debut on 2 May when he lined out at full-back in a 1–20 to 3–13 defeat of Clare. He played his last game in the minor grade on 29 June when Waterford suffered a 2–25 to 0–12 defeat by Tipperary.

On 18 July 2013, de Búrca made his first appearance for the Waterford under-21 hurling team. He lined out at full-back in a 2–15 to 0–17 defeat by Clare in the Munster Championship.

de Búrca was again included on the Waterford under-21 team for 2014 Munster Championship. His only appearance that year was at centre-back in Waterford's 3–18 to 0–16 defeat by Cork on 16 July.

For the third successive season, de Búrca was selected for the under-21 team in 2015. He made his last appearance in the grade on 15 July when Waterford suffered a 0–23 to 1–18 defeat by Clare at the semi-final stage.

==== Senior ====
de Búrca made his first appearance for the Waterford senior team on 12 January 2014 when he lined out in a 1–11 to 0–10 defeat by the University of Limerick in the pre-season Waterford Crystal Cup. He was later included on the Waterford panel for the 2014 National League and made his first appearance on 23 February in a 0–22 to 1–13 defeat of Galway. de Búrca made his Munster Championship debut on 25 May 2014 when he scored a point from left wing-back in a 1-21 apiece draw with Cork.

On 3 May 2015, de Búrca was named at left corner-back but lined out at centre-back in the 2015 National League final. The 1–24 to 0–17 victory gave him a National League winners' medal. On 12 July 2015, de Búrca played as a sweeper when Waterford were beaten for the fourth time in six seasons by Tipperary in the 2015 Munster final. He ended the season by winning a GAA/GPA All-Star award, while he was also named Young Hurler of the Year.

On 1 May 2016, de Búrca was selected at right wing-back when Waterford drew 0-22 apiece with Clare in the 2016 National League final. He was named in the same position but spent much of the game at midfield for the replay, which Waterford lost by 1–23 to 2–19. On 10 July, de Búrca lined out at centre-back for the 2016 Munster final, with Waterford eventually losing by 5–19 to 0–13. He ended the season by being nominated for a second successive GAA/GPA All-Star award.

On 23 July 2017, de Búrca received a straight red card for deliberately interfering with the helmet or faceguard of Wexford's Harry Kehoe in the All-Ireland quarter-final. In spite of an appeal the Disputes Resolution Authority upheld the suspension, resulting in de Búrca missing Waterford's All-Ireland semi-final defeat of Cork. On 3 September, he was restored to the starting fifteen for the All-Ireland final against Galway. Waterford eventually lost the final by 0–26 to 2–17. de Búrca ended the season by being nominated for a third successive GAA/GPA All-Star award.

On 27 May 2018, de Búrca was forced off with a shoulder injury in the 14th minute in Waterford's 2–27 to 2–18 defeat by Clare in the opening round of Munster Championship. It was later confirmed that he had broken his collar bone and was ruled out for the rest of the season.

On 31 March 2019, de Búrca was at centre-back when Waterford suffered a 1–24 to 0–19 defeat by Limerick in the National League final.

== Career statistics ==
As of match played 28 November 2020.

Team	Year	National League			Munster		All-Ireland		Total	
Team	Year	Division	Apps	Score	Apps	Score	Apps	Score	Apps	Score
Waterford	2014	Division 1A	4	0-00	2	0-00	2	0-00	8	0-00
Waterford	2015	Division 1B	8	0-00	2	0-01	2	0-00	12	0-01
Waterford	2016	Division 1B	6	0-01	2	0-00	3	0-00	11	0-01
Waterford	2017	Division 1B	6	0-00	1	0-00	4	0-04	11	0-04
Waterford	2018	Division 1B	5	0-03	1	0-01	—		6	0-04
Waterford	2019	Division 1B	4	0-01	4	0-01	—		8	0-02
Waterford	2020	Division 1A	0	0-00	2	0-00	2	0-02	4	0-02
Career total			33	0-05	14	0-03	13	0-06	60	0-14

== Honours ==
St. Augustine's College

- All-Ireland Colleges Senior C Football Championship (1): 2013

Dungarvan Colleges

- Dr. Croke Cup (1): 2013
- Dr. Harty Cup (2): 2012, 2013

Clashmore–Kinsalebeg

- Waterford Minor Football Championship (1): 2009

Waterford

- National Hurling League (1): 2015

Individual

- All Stars Young Hurler of the Year: 2015
- GAA GPA All Stars Awards (2): 2015, 2020
