= Ferrybank =

Ferrybank may refer to:

- Ferrybank, Waterford, Ireland, a suburb of Waterford City
  - Ferrybank GAA
- Ferrybank, Wexford, Ireland, a townland near Wexford Town
