= Eoin Murphy (Waterford hurler) =

Irish hurler (born 1978)

Personal information
- Native name: Eoin Ó Murchú (Irish)
- Nickname: Dougal
- Born: 17 December 1978 (age 47) Knockanore, County Waterford, Ireland
- Height: 5 ft 10 in (178 cm)

Sport
- Sport: Hurling
- Position: Right corner-back
Clubs
- Years: Club
- 1995–present: Shamrocks; UCC
Club titles
- Waterford titles: 0
Inter-county*
Years	County	Apps (scores)
2001–2011	Waterford	42 (0–2)
Inter-county titles
- Munster titles: 4
- All-Irelands: 0
- NHL: 1
- All Stars: 1
- *Inter County team apps and scores correct as of 13:31, 2 November 2012.

Eoin Murphy (born 17 December 1978) is an Irish hurler who played as a right wing-back for the Waterford senior team. More famously however, he played at right back for Garryduff FC from 2007 to 2010, forming part of the meanest defence in the league and always listening to Dave.

Murphy joined the team during the 2001 National League and was a regular member of the starting fifteen until his retirement after the 2011 championship. During that time he won four Munster winners' medals, one National League winners' medal and one All-Star award. Murphy ended up as an All-Ireland runner-up on one occasion.

At club level Murphy is a one-time county intermediate championship medalist with Shamrocks.

== Playing career ==
=== College ===
Murphy received his secondary schooling at St. Colman's College, Fermoy where he also developed his hurling skills. After winning a Dean Ryan Cup medal he later joined the senior hurling team at the college. In 1996 Murphy won a Dr. Harty Cup medal in his final year on the team.

=== University ===
Murphy later attended University College Cork where he also linked up with the university hurling team. He was a member of the extended hurling panel in 1997 as UCC claimed the Fitzgibbon Cup following a defeat of Garda College.

Injury kept Murphy off the team for much of 1998; however, he returned to the panel once again in 1999.

=== Club ===
Murphy plays his club hurling and Gaelic football with the Shamrocks club and has enjoyed some success.

He made his senior debut for the club as a sixteen-year-old in 1995, before winning a county minor hurling championship medal in 1997 with a combined Tallow-Shamrocks side.

In 1999 Murphy returned from a serious injury as Shamrocks qualified for the intermediate hurling decider. A 1–12 to 0–7 defeat of Dunhill gave Murphy a Waterford Intermediate Hurling Championship medal.

=== Inter-county ===
Murphy made his senior debut for Waterford in a National League game against Wexford in 2001. Later that season he made his championship debut in a defeat by Limerick.

In 2002 Murphy claimed his first Munster medal as Waterford defeated Tipperary by 2–23 to 3–12 to claim the provincial crown for the first time in thirty-nine years.

After surrendering their title the following year, 2004 saw Waterford qualify for a third successive Munster final with Cork providing the opposition once again. Described as the game that had everything Waterford beat Cork by 3–16 to 1–21 to win one of the greatest games of hurling ever played. It was Murphy's second Munster medal. The subsequent All-Ireland semi-final saw Waterford take on a wounded Kilkenny team. In spite of this 'the Cats' were the winners by 3–12 to 0–18.

The following two years brought little success for Murphy and Waterford. In 2005 and 2006 they reached the All-Ireland knock-out series, however, they were beaten on both occasions by Cork. In spite of this Murphy won an All-Star award in 2006.

In 2007 Murphy added a National Hurling League medal to his collection when Waterford defeated Kilkenny by 0–20 to 0–18 in the final. He later claimed a third Munster medal as Waterford defeated Limerick by 3–17 to 1–14 in the provincial decider. While Waterford were viewed as possibly going on and winning the All-Ireland title for the first time in almost half a century, Limerick ambushed Murphy's side in the All-Ireland semi-final.

2008 began poorly for Waterford as the team lost their opening game to Clare as well as their manager Justin McCarthy. In spite of this poor start Murphy's side reached the All-Ireland final for the first time in forty-five years. Kilkenny provided the opposition and went on to trounce Waterford by 3–30 to 1–13 to claim a third All-Ireland title in-a-row.

Murphy lined out in another Munster final in 2010 with Cork providing the opposition. A 2–15 apiece draw was the result on that occasion, however, Waterford went on to win the replay after an extra-time goal by Dan Shanahan. It was a fourth Munster winners' medal for Murphy, a record that he shares with five other Waterford players.

In September 2011 Murphy announced his retirement from inter-county hurling.

=== Inter-provincial ===
Murphy has also lined out with Munster in the inter-provincial series of games and has enjoyed some success.

In 2005 he made his debut with the province as Munster reached the final against Leinster. A 1–21 to 2–14 defeat of their great rivals gave Murphy his first Railway Cup medal.

Two years later Murphy was back on the team. He won a second Railway Cup medal that year as Connacht were defeated by 2–22 to 2–19.

== Honours ==
=== Team ===
St. Colman's College

- Dr. Harty Cup (1): 1996

Shamrocks

- Waterford Intermediate Hurling Championship (1): 1999

Waterford

- Munster Senior Hurling Championship (4): 2002, 2004, 2007, 2010
- National Hurling League (1): 2007

Munster

- Inter-provincial Championship (2): 2005, 2007

=== Individual ===
- All-Stars (1): 2006
