= Rinn Ó gCuanach CLG =

Gaelic games club in County Waterford, Ireland

Rinn Ó gCuanach
- Founded: 1890
- County: Waterford
- Colours: Blue & Gold
- Grounds: Páirc Uí Shíocháin, Ring
- Coordinates: 52.044°N 7.570°W

Playing kits
Standard colours

Rinn Ó gCuanach CLG is a Gaelic Athletic Association club based in the Irish speaking (Gaeltacht) area of Ring, County Waterford, Ireland. The club fields teams of both GAA codes, including two adult Gaelic football teams and two adult hurling teams in the Waterford County Championships. It is one of a small number of dual clubs at senior level in the county, competing in the Senior Hurling and Senior Football championships. The club's second string teams take part in the Waterford Junior Hurling and Football championships.

== Recent history ==
In 1991, the club's Junior Hurling team won the County Junior Hurling Championship title beating Kilmacthomas of East Waterford in the Final. The County Junior double was completed when the Junior footballers beat Tramore. The club was awarded "Waterford Club of the Year" for this historic achievement.

The club has won the County Intermediate Football Championship twice, 1996 and 2005. De La Salle were overcome in both these finals.

The club won the Waterford Intermediate Hurling Championship for the first time in its history in 2008, when St. Mollerans were defeated in the County Final on a scoreline of 3-05 to 2-05. In the West Waterford intermediate hurling championship, Rinn O gCuanach emerged from a group containing Clashmore, Geraldines, Cappoquin and Shamrocks, before beating Lismore, Clashmore and Brickey Rangers to capture the Western crown for the first time. The club had contested the 2004 and 2007 West Waterford Intermediate Hurling Finals, losing to Shamrocks and Dungarvan.

In June 2008, An Rinn captured the Comórtas Peile na Gaeltachta title for the first time in the club's history. The 2008 tournament was staged by the Naomh Columba club in Gleann Colm Cille, County Donegal. En route to the title, An Rinn beat Béal Átha an Ghaorthaidh from Cork, Laochra Loch Laoi from Belfast, and Naomh Mhuire from Donegal before defeating Piarsaigh na Dromaide from County Kerry in the final.

In October 2012, An Rinn won its second intermediate hurling county final. The game was played in Páirc Uí Fhearchair and the scoreline was An Rinn 1-14 Portlaw 0-4. This win saw An Rinn return to dual senior status in County Waterford in 2013. An Rinn beat Cappoquin in the Western Final 2-10 to 0-14 on 29 September in Páirc Uí Fhearchair. In the 2012 senior football county championship, An Rinn were defeated in the quarter final by Ballinacourty on a scoreline of 1-13 to 2-7.

== Honours ==
- Waterford Intermediate Hurling Championship (3): 2008, 2012, 2017
- Waterford Intermediate Football Championship (2): 1996, 2005
- Waterford Junior Football Championship (3): 1924, 1962, 1991
- Waterford Junior Hurling Championship (1): 1991
- Waterford Under-21 Football Championship (1): 1967
- Waterford Minor Football Championship (2): 1954, 1955
- Comórtas Peile na Gaeltachta (1): 2008
