= Joe Harney =

Irish hurler (1935–2020

Personal information
- Native name: Seosamh Ó hAthairne (Irish)
- Born: 1935 Ballydurn, County Waterford, Ireland
- Died: 17 April 2020 (aged 84) Ballydurn, County Waterford, Ireland
- Occupation: Farmer
- Height: 5 ft 9 in (175 cm)

Sport
- Sport: Hurling
- Position: Right corner-back
Club
- Years: Club
- Ballydurn
Club titles
- Waterford titles: 0
Inter-county
- Years: County
- 1958-1962; 1967: Waterford
Inter-county titles
- Munster titles: 2
- All-Irelands: 1
- NHL: 0

Joseph Harney (1935 – 17 April 2020) was an Irish hurler. At club level he played with Ballydurn and at inter-county level with the Waterford senior hurling team.

== Career ==
Harney first played hurling as a schoolboy at Newtown National School before later attending St Augustine's College in Dungarvan. He first played for the Ballydurn club at minor level as a 14-year-old, while also lining out with Dunhill-O'Briens and Clonea before returning to line out at adult level with Ballydurn.

Harney was part of Waterford's junior team that lost to Kerry in the 1956 Munster junior final. He later progressed to the senior team and was a non-playing substitute when Kilkenny beat Waterford by 4-10 to 3-12 in the 1957 All-Ireland final. Harney made his debut in a National Hurling League game against Cork the following year. He was at right corner-back when Waterford beat Kilkenny by 3-12 to 1-10 in the 1959 All-Ireland final replay.

Harney retired from inter-county hurling in 1962 but had his first club success that year when Ballydurn won the Waterford JHC title after a defeat of Fourmilewater. He made a brief return to inter-county activity when he was recalled to the Waterford team in 1967. Harney ended his club career by winning a Waterford IHC title in 1973.

== Death ==
Harney died on 17 April 2020, at the age of 84.

== Honours ==
Ballydurn

- Waterford Intermediate Hurling Championship (1): 1973
- Waterford Junior Hurling Championship (1): 1962

Waterford

- All-Ireland Senior Hurling Championship (1): 1959
- Munster Senior Hurling Championship (2): 1957, 1959
