= Waterford Intermediate Football Championship =

Annual Gaelic football competition

Waterford Intermediate Football Championship is a second tier Gaelic Athletic Association competition between Gaelic football clubs organised by Waterford GAA. The winning club is eligible to play in the senior grade the following year for the Waterford Senior Football Championship. The winning club also represents Waterford GAA in the Munster Intermediate Club Football Championship. Each of the two divisions of Waterford GAA - East Division and West Division - organises its own competition, with the two winners contesting the county final.

== Qualification for subsequent competitions ==
=== Munster Intermediate Club Football Championship ===
The Waterford IFC winners qualify for the Munster Intermediate Club Football Championship. It is the only team from County Waterford to qualify for this competition. The Waterford IFC winners enter the Munster Intermediate Club Football Championship at the __ stage. For example, 2004 winner Gaultier played in the Munster IFC final.

=== All-Ireland Intermediate Club Football Championship ===
The Waterford IFC winners — by winning the Munster Intermediate Club Football Championship — may qualify for the All-Ireland Intermediate Club Football Championship, at which they would enter at the __ stage.

== History ==
The competition attracted significant national attention in 2020 when a player competed despite awaiting the result of a COVID-19 test, which returned a positive result. This led to Dungarvan (that year's competition-winning club) being stripped of the title.

== Roll of honour ==
Year	Winner	Score	Opponent	Score
2025	Mount Sion	2-13	Colligan	0-09
2024	Tramore	5-10	Sliabh gCua	2-05
2023	De La Salle	1-10	The Nire	1-05
2022	Roanmore	2-08	Ballinameela	0-09
2021	Portlaw	1-08	Dungarvan	1-06
2020	Dungarvan	0-14	Kill	0-10
2019	St. Saviour's	0-08	Modeligo	0-07
2018	Kilmacthomas	2-13	Modeligo	1-14
2017	Dungarvan	1-09	St. Saviour's	0-08
2016	Portlaw	2-04	Geraldines	0-08
2015	Ballinameela	1-12	Bonmahon	2-07
2014	Brickey Rangers	3-08	Portlaw	1-11
2013	De La Salle	0-14	Ballyduff Upper	0-06
2012	Ballinameela	0-12	De La Salle	1-08
2011	Dungarvan	1-07	John Mitchels	0-03
2010	Clashmore	1-13	John Mitchels	1-07
2009	Ballinameela	(1-04) 1-16 (R)	Ballyduff Lower	(0-07) 1-13 (R)
2008	Tramore	0-12	Geraldines	0-10
2007	John Mitchels	1-10	Ballinameela	0-09
2006	Brickey Rangers	0-11	Kill	1-03
2005	Rinn O gCuanach	0-10	De La Salle	1-06
2004	Gaultier	0-10	Brickey Rangers	1-05
2003	John Mitchels	0-08	Ballinameela	0-06
2002	Clashmore	2-08	Newtown	0-11
2001	Kilmacthomas	(0-09) 1-13 (R)	Rinn O gCuanach	(1-06) 0-04 (R)
2000	Lismore	2-08	Gaultier	1-06
1999	Clashmore	2-10	Butlerstown	0-09
1998	Ballinacourty	1-10	De La Salle	0-08
1997	Ardmore	2-06	Dunhill	1-03
1996	Rinn O gCuanach	(3-02) 1-07 (R)	De La Salle	(0-11) 0-09 (R)
1995	Kill	0-11	Faha	1-02
1994	Bonmahon	2-07	Rinn O gCuanach	1-05
1993	Newtown	0-12	Rinn O gCuanach	0-11
1992	Affane	1-05	Portlaw	1-03
1991	Sliabh gCua	0-06	Newtown	0-05
1990	Faha	2-05	Newtown	1-04
1989	Sliabh gCua	3-10	Portlaw	1-10
1988	Gaultier	5-06	Sliabh gCua	2-04
1987	St. Saviour's	3-11	Shamrocks	1-01
1986	Brickey Rangers	2-06	Kilure/Ballytruckle	1-03
1985	Dungarvan	4-09	Kilure/Ballytruckle	1-04
1984	Rathgormack	1-13	Geraldine's	1-01
1983	The Nire	0-10	Ballyduff Lower	0-04
1982	Butlerstown		Ballyduff Upper	
1981	Ballyduff Upper	2-08	Butlerstown	1-05
1980	Brickey Rangers	2-11	Butlerstown	0-09
1979	Ballinameela	1-14	Gaultier	1-03
1978	Ferrybank	2-06	Brickey Rangers	1-04
1977	Clashmore	0-12	Ferrybank	1-03
1976	Tallow	0-08	Gaultier	0-04
1975	Bonmahon	2-05	Clashmore	1-05
1974	Rathgormack	1-05	Rinn O gCuanach	2-01
1973	Ballyduff Upper	0-14	Tramore	1-05
1972	Ardmore	2-06	The Nire	2-03
1971	The Nire	3-09	Erin's Own	0-04
1970	Dunhill	4-07	The Nire	0-07
1969	Clashmore	3-06	Dunhill	2-04
1968				
1967	Tramore	1-08	Old Parish	1-04
1966	Affane	2-04	Ballyduff Lower/Portlaw	1-02
1965	Ballinacourty	3-09	Rathgormack	1-00
1964	Erin's Own	2-10	Affane	0-02
1963	Valley Rovers	1-03	Tramore	0-03
