= Colin Dunford =

Irish hurler

Personal information
- Native name: Cóilín Ó Donnuartaigh (Irish)
- Born: 15 September 1994 (age 32) Colligan Bridge, County Waterford, Ireland
- Occupation: Special needs assistant
- Height: 5 ft 10 in (178 cm)

Sport
- Sport: Hurling
- Position: Right corner-forward
Club
- Years: Club
- Colligan
Club titles
- Waterford titles: 0
College
- Years: College
- 2014-2020: Institute of Technology, Carlow
College titles
- Fitzgibbon titles: 0
Inter-county*
Years	County	Apps (scores)
2014-present	Waterford	19 (2-14)
Inter-county titles
- Munster titles: 0
- All-Irelands: 0
- NHL: 1
- All Stars: 0
- *Inter County team apps and scores correct as of 22:32, 30 November 2020.

Colin Dunford (born 15 September 1994) is an Irish hurler who plays for Waterford Intermediate Championship club Colligan and at inter-county level with the Waterford senior hurling team. He usually lines out as a right corner-forward.

== Career statistics ==
As of match played 28 November 2020.

Team	Year	National League			Munster		All-Ireland		Total	
Team	Year	Division	Apps	Score	Apps	Score	Apps	Score	Apps	Score
Waterford	2014	Division 1A	0	0-00	2	0-02	2	2-02	4	2-04
Waterford	2015	Division 1B	6	1-06	2	0-02	2	0-06	10	1-14
Waterford	2016	Division 1A	8	0-09	2	0-00	2	0-00	12	0-09
Waterford	2017	Division 1A	3	0-00	0	0-00	5	0-02	8	0-02
Waterford	2018	Division 1A	4	0-02	1	0-00	—		5	0-02
Waterford	2019	Division 1A	6	0-02	1	0-00	—		7	0-02
Waterford	2020	Division 1B	0	0-00	0	0-00	0	0-00	0	0-00
Career total			27	1-19	8	0-04	11	2-10	46	3-33

== Honours ==
Dungarvan CBS

- All-Ireland Colleges Senior B Hurling Championship: 2013
- Munster Colleges Senior B Hurling Championship: 2013

Dungarvan Colleges

- Dr Croke Cup: 2013
- Dr Harty Cup: 2012, 2013

Waterford

- National Hurling League (1): 2015
