= Reuben Halloran =

Irish hurler

Personal information
- Native name: Reuben Ó hAllúráin (Irish)
- Born: 2002 (age 23–24) Waterford, Ireland
- Occupation: Student
- Height: 6 ft 0 in (183 cm)

Sport
- Sport: Hurling
- Position: Centre-forward
Club*
Years	Club	Apps (scores)
2020-present	De La Salle	26 (7-194)
Club titles
- Waterford titles: 0
College
- Years: College
- SETU Waterford
College titles
- Fitzgibbon titles: 0
Inter-county**
Years	County	Apps (scores)
2023-	Waterford	0 (0-00)
Inter-county titles
- Munster titles: 0
- All-Irelands: 0
- NHL: 0
- All Stars: 0
- * club appearances and scores correct as of 21:38, 8 February 2026. **Inter County team apps and scores correct as of 21:25, 8 February 2022.

Reuben Halloran (born in 2002) is an Irish hurler. At college level he plays for SETU Waterford, at club level he plays with De La Salle and at inter-county level with the Waterford senior hurling team. He usually lines out as a forward.

== Career ==
Halloran first played hurling at juvenile and underage levels with the De La Salle club, while also playing as a schoolboy with the De La Salle College in the Harty Cup. He scored all 1-14 of De La Salle's tally when they beat Ballygunner to claim the Waterford U20AHC title. Halloran has also lined out with SETU Waterford in the Fitzgibbon Cup.

Halloran first appeared on the inter-county scene as a member of the Waterford minor hurling team in 2019. He immediately progressed to the under-20 team, however, he missed out on his third and final season with the team in 2022 due to a hamstring injury.

Halloran first played for the senior team during the 2023 Munster Senior Hurling League.

== Career statistics ==
=== Club ===
As of 31 August 2025

Team	Year	Waterford SHC	
Team	Year	Apps	Score
De La Salle	2020	3	1-05
De La Salle	2021	2	1-15
De La Salle	2022	5	3-24
De La Salle	2023	5	0-54
De La Salle	2024	4	1-36
De La Salle	2025	7	1-60
Career total		26	7-194

=== Inter-county ===
As of 8 February 2026

Team	Year	National League			Munster		All-Ireland		Total	
Team	Year	Division	Apps	Score	Apps	Score	Apps	Score	Apps	Score
Waterford	2023	Division 1B	3	0-02	0	0-00	—		3	0-02
Waterford	2024	Division 1A	0	0-00	0	0-00	—		0	0-00
Waterford	2025	Division 1B	0	0-00	0	0-00	—		0	0-00
Waterford	2026	Division 1A	3	1-36	0	0-00	—		3	1-36
Career total			6	1-38	0	0-00	0	0-00	6	1-38

== Honours ==
De La Salle

- Waterford Under-21 A Hurling Championship: 2022
