= Newtown/Ballydurn GAA =

Gaelic games club in County Waterford, Ireland

Newtown/Ballydurn
- Baill Nua/Baile Duirn
- Founded: 1887
- County: Waterford
- Colours: Blue and white
- Grounds: Ballydurn

Playing kits
Standard colours

Senior Club Championships
	All Ireland	Munster champions	Waterford champions
Hurling:	0	0	1

Newtown/Ballydurn GAA is a Gaelic Athletic Association club in Ballydurn, County Waterford, Ireland. The club fields teams in both hurling (as Ballydurn) and Gaelic football (as Newtown).

== History ==
Located in the village of Ballydurn, just outside the town of Kilmacthomas, County Waterford, Newtown/Ballydurn GAA Club was founded in 1887. The Ballydurn club was in its infancy when they won the Waterford SHC title in 1889. The club later spent many years competing in the lower grades before winning the Waterford JAHC title in 1962. Senior status was secured once again when the club claimed the Waterford IHC title in 1973. Further Waterford JAHC titles were won in 1990 and 2010. As Newtown, the club achieved senior football status in 1993 when the Waterford IFC title was claimed.

== Honours ==
- Waterford Senior Hurling Championship (1): 1889
- Waterford Intermediate Hurling Championship (1): 1973
- Waterford Intermediate Football Championship (1): 1993
- Waterford Junior A Hurling Championship (3): 1962, 1990, 2010

== Notable players ==
- Joe Harney: All-Ireland SHC-winner (1959)
- Peter Queally: Munster SHC-winner (2002)
