= Clashmore–Kinsalebeg GAA =

Gaelic games club in County Waterford, Ireland

Clashmore–Kinsalebeg
- An Chlais Mhór–Cionn tSáile Beag
- Founded: 1885
- County: Waterford
- Colours: Red and Green
- Grounds: Clashmore–Kinsalebeg GAA Club Grounds, Ballyheeny
- Coordinates: 52°00′21.56″N 7°49′11.63″W

Playing kits
Standard colours

Senior Club Championships
	All Ireland	Munster champions	Waterford champions
Football:	-	-	19

Clashmore–Kinsalebeg GAA Club is a Gaelic Athletic Association club based in Clashmore, County Waterford, Ireland. The club fields teams in both hurling and gaelic football.

== History ==
Kinsalebeg was among the first clubs in the country, established in 1885, the year after the GAA was formed, and went on to contest the first football final, losing to Ballysaggart. They went on to win the Senior football championship in 1886 and 1891. The Clashmore half of the club came to prevalence after the turn of the century, when as a separate club they won five Waterford county football titles between 1903 and 1907, while also contesting many Munster Championship matches during that period. County success did not come again until 1920, when Clashmore beat Rathgormack by 0-4 to 0-3, before losing to Geraldines in the 1922 final by 2-0 to 0-1. Then, in 1925 both halves of the parish combined to beat Rinn Ó gCuanach by 0-2 to 0-1 in what would be their last County Senior win.

Following an unsuccessful period, the club was re-founded in 1959 by Joseph O'Keeffe and others. Clashmore won what was called the Primary Championship in 1962 by beating Portlaw by 1-10 to 0-4. The Kinsalebeg club had again been playing as a separate entity for some years previous, but in 1967 both clubs combined once again. Success came in 1969 when Clashmore-Kinsalebeg won a double by winning the Waterford Intermediate Football Championship title against Dunhill by 3-6 to 2-4, and a Waterford Junior Hurling Championship title when beating Kilgobinet by 3-4 to 3-2.

The next success came in the Intermediate grade in 1977 with a county final victory over Ferrybank by 0-12 to 1-3 at the Shandon field in Dungarvan. The following year, largely the same team got to the Waterford Senior Football Championship final, where they were defeated by Ballinacourty. More or less this same team reached the Senior county final in 1982, but were beaten by a goal by Stradbally.

In the late 1990s, the team was once again in the Intermediate Grade. They won the 1999 Championship by beating Butlerstown in the Fraher Field. 2000 saw their second Junior Hurling title, when Fenor were beaten by 1-8 to 0-5 in the final at Walsh Park. In 2001, the football team was relegated to Intermediate again, but in 2002 they were promoted to Senior again after victories over Brickey Rangers, Sliabh gCua, Brickey Rangers again, Rinn Ó gCuanach after a replay, and Newtown, who were beaten by 2-8 to 0-9 in the County Final at Kill.

Clashmore–Kinsalebeg were relegated from the Senior ranks in the 2009 season, losing to Brickey Rangers by a single point after a replay in the relegation final. However, they won promotion the year after with a victory over John Mitchels in the Waterford Intermediate Football Championship Final by a scoreline of 1-13 to 1-7.

Despite being a very small club, Clashmore–Kinsalebeg have a good tradition of supplying players to county teams. Players from the club that have played senior hurling for Waterford include Tadhg de Búrca and Brian O'Halloran. Other players of note to have played for Waterford include Cillian O'Keeffe, Kieran Connery, Sean Fleming, Karl O'Keeffe, Jason Seward and Stephen Barron. Two members of the current club Premier Intermediate hurling team, Edmond O'Halloran and Paul O'Connor, have won minor and U21 All-Ireland hurling medals with Waterford.

Clashmore-Kinsalebeg won the Premier Intermediate Hurling Championship in 2026 and thus play Senior Hurling in 2027 for the first time in their 141 year old history.

== Notable players ==
- Tadhg de Búrca
- Brian O'Halloran

== Honours ==
=== Football ===
- Waterford Senior Football Championships: 9
  - 1886 (Kinsalebeg), 1891(Kinsalebeg), 1903(Clashmore), 1904(Clashmore), 1905(Clashmore), 1906(Clashmore), 1907(Clashmore), 1920(Clashmore), 1925(Clashmore)
- Waterford Intermediate Football Championships: 5
  - 1969, 1977, 1999, 2002, 2010
- Waterford Under-21 Football Championships: 1
  - 2005
- Waterford Minor Football Championships: 1
  - 2009 (Division 1)

=== Hurling ===
- Waterford Premier Intermediate Hurling Championship: 1
  - 2026
- Western intermediate Hurling championship: 1
  - 2018
- Waterford Junior Hurling Championships: 2
  - 1969, 2000
- Waterford Minor Hurling Championships: 1
  - 2010 (Division 3).
