= Mark O'Brien (hurler) =

Irish hurler

Personal information
- Native name: Marc Ó Briain (Irish)
- Born: 22 September 1995 (age 31) Ferrybank, County Waterford, Ireland
- Height: 5 ft 11 in (180 cm)

Sport
- Sport: Hurling
- Position: Midfield
Club
- Years: Club
- Ferrybank
Club titles
- Waterford titles: 0
College
- Years: College
- University College Cork
College titles
- Fitzgibbon titles: 0
Inter-county
- Years: County
- 2017-present: Waterford
Inter-county titles
- Munster titles: 0
- All-Irelands: 0
- NHL: 0
- All Stars: 0

Mark O'Brien (born 22 September 1995) is an Irish hurler who plays for Waterford Championship club Ferrybank and at inter-county level with the Waterford senior hurling team. He usually lines out as a midfielder.

== Honours ==
Waterford

- All-Ireland Under-21 Hurling Championship (1): 2016
- Munster Under-21 Hurling Championship (1): 2016
- All-Ireland Minor Hurling Championship (1): 2013
