= Jamie Nagle =

Waterford hurler

Personal information
- Native name: Séamus de Nagle (Irish)
- Born: 19 December 1986 (age 39) Waterford, Ireland
- Occupation: Primary school teacher
- Height: 1.75 m (5 ft 9 in)

Sport
- Sport: Hurling
- Position: Midfield
Club
- Years: Club
- 2003–: Dungarvan
Inter-county
- Years: County
- 2007–2014: Waterford
Inter-county titles
- Munster titles: 2
- NHL: 1

Jamie Nagle (born 19 December 1986) is an Irish former hurler who played as a midfielder at senior level for the Waterford county team.

Nagle joined the team during the 2007 National League and became a regular member of the starting fifteen over subsequent seasons. Since then he has won one Munster SHC medal and one National Hurling League medal. Nagle has been an All-Ireland SHC runner-up on one occasion.

At club level, Nagle was a county intermediate championship medalist with Dungarvan.

== Playing career ==
=== Club ===
Nagle played his club hurling with Dungarvan.

In 2009, he won a county intermediate championship following a narrow 1–20 to 2–16 defeat of Clonea.

=== Inter-county ===
Nagle made his senior debut for Waterford in the National Hurling League in 2007.

In 2008, Nagle made his senior championship debut; however, all was not well for Waterford. In spite of a poor start and a change of management Nagle's side reached the All-Ireland SHC final for the first time in forty-five years. Kilkenny provided the opposition and went on to trounce Waterford by 3–30 to 1–13 to claim a third consecutive All-Ireland SHC title.

Nagle lined out in another Munster final in 2010 with Cork providing the opposition. A 2-15 apiece draw was the result on that occasion; however, Waterford went on to win the replay after an extra-time goal by Dan Shanahan. It was a first Munster SHC winners' medal for Nagle.
