= Donal Foley =

- Born: 1922
- Died: 1981 (aged 58–59)
- Occupation: Journalist

Donal Foley (1922–1981) was a journalist and newspaper editor. He worked as London editor for The Irish Press before starting work for The Irish Times. He was born in the Ring Gaeltacht in 1922 and grew up in Ferrybank.

Foley wrote the satirical column "Man Bites Dog" in The Irish Times from 1971 until his death in 1981.

His autobiography is called The Three Villages.
