= Ferrybank, Waterford =

Suburb of Waterford City, Ireland

Ferrybank Irish: Port an Chalaidh
- Suburb
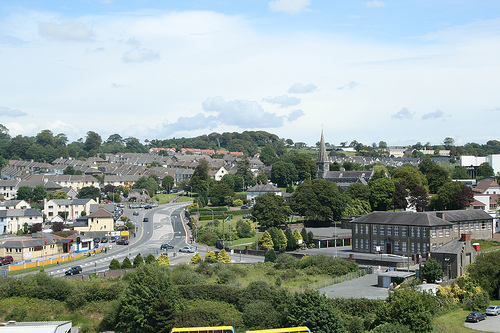
- Overlooking Fountain Street in Ferrybank

- Location in Ireland
- Coordinates: 52°15′55″N 7°06′15″W
- Country: Ireland
- Province: Munster, Leinster
- County: County Waterford, County Kilkenny
- Time zone: UTC+0 (WET)
  - Summer (DST): UTC-1 (IST (WEST))
- Irish grid reference: S614131

Ferrybank (Irish: Port an Chalaidh) is a suburb of Waterford City in Ireland. Parts of Ferrybank, or "the village" as it is referred to locally, is under the political jurisdiction of Waterford City and County Council and thus an area of administration for Waterford City, on the northern bank of the River Suir, extending into County Waterford. However, other parts of Ferrybank extend into County Kilkenny and are administered by Kilkenny County Council. There has been a long-lasting boundary dispute between both jurisdictions, with debates and proposals ongoing for many decades.

== Sport ==
A team representing Ferrybank won the Waterford Senior Hurling Championship in 1915, 1916 and 1919. The team in its current form, Ferrybank GAA and Camogie Club, was formed in 1950 and celebrated its 50th anniversary in 2000. The club won the 2023 Waterford Premier Intermediate Hurling Championship. Locky Byrne is an inter-county hurler who was from the area, and played for both the Waterford and Kilkenny teams in the 1930s and 1940s.

Athletic events have been held in Ferrybank since 1869. Members of Ferrybank Athletic Club (Ferrybank AC) to have represented Ireland include Brendan Quinn at the 1988 Olympics and Kelly Proper at the 2010 European Championships.

Ferrybank AFC, the local association football club, was founded in 1948. Notable players at the club have included John O'Shea, of Manchester United and the Republic of Ireland national team, who played underage football with the club. Romeo Akachukwu, who later joined Southampton F.C., also played with Ferrybank AFC.

== Development ==
=== Ghost shopping centres ===
The Ross Abbey Town Centre Shopping Complex was built in 2008 at a cost of €7 million and was sold in 2013 for €225k. It remained empty for several years after it was constructed. In 2017 (nearly 10 years after the complex was completed) the discount retailer "Mr Price" opened a unit within the development. Since then, a number of other businesses have opened within the complex.

The Ferrybank Shopping Centre on the south Kilkenny/Waterford border was completed in 2008 at a cost of €100m. It never opened, due to the failure of Dunnes Stores to take up its planned anchor tenancy, and (as of late 2023) remained closed. While containing no retail outlets, part of the development has housed a local library and county council office. In 2025, Dunnes Stores was granted planning permission to begin operations at the shopping centre, but this was blocked pending a judicial review sought by Waterford City Council.

=== North Quays project ===
Since 2023, parts of Ferrybank have been undergoing redevelopment as part of the Waterford North Quays project. This development is planned to include services such as a train station and transport hub with an accompanying new bridge across the river, offices, residential units and public spaces.

The redevelopment includes the area previously occupied by the city wharves along the northern bank of the river and the site of the derelict R&H Hall Flour Mills which were demolished in stages between 2016 and 2018. As of November 2025, a majority of the planned land clearances and roadworks were complete and the new transport bridge installed, but not yet opened for use. As of late 2025, the new train station building was approaching completion, and expected to open during 2027.

== People ==
- Donal Foley, a writer and editor at The Irish Times, grew up in Ferrybank.
- John O'Shea, former international footballer, lived and went to school in the area.
- Craig Breen, rally driver who competed in the World Rally Championship, attended school in Ferrybank.
