= Fenor GAA =

Gaelic games club in County Waterford, Ireland

Fenor GAA Club
- Fionnúir CLG
- Founded: 1885
- County: Waterford
- Colours: White and green trim
- Grounds: William Flynn Park
- Coordinates: 52°09′39.31″N 7°13′22.26″W

Playing kits
Standard colours

Senior Club Championships
	All Ireland	Munster champions	Waterford champions
Football:	-	-	1

Fenor GAA is a Gaelic Athletic Association club based in the small east Waterford, Ireland village of Fenor. The club enters teams in both Gaelic football and hurling each year, both of which compete in their respective junior championships.

Fenor's greatest achievement was winning the Waterford Senior Football Championship in 1932. Fenor also collected countless junior hurling titles in 1990s and 2000s (decade) but they never gained promotion to intermediate status.

== Honours ==
- Waterford Senior Football Championships: 1
  - 1932
- Waterford Junior Hurling Championships: 1
  - 2015
- Munster Junior Club Hurling Championships0
  - Runners-Up 2015
- Waterford Junior Football Championships:
  - 1928, 1979
- Waterford Minor Hurling Championships: 0
  - Runner-Up 2009 (with Dunhill)
