= Colligan–Emmets GAA =

Gaelic Athletic Association club

- An Coilligeán
- Founded: 1928
- County: Waterford
- Nickname: Hurling: Rockies; Football: Emmets
- Colours: Amber and black hoops
- Grounds: Pairc Chuileagáin / Na hEmmetigh
- Coordinates: 52°09′29.33″N 7°41′07.65″W

Playing kits
Standard colours

Colligan–Emmets GAA is a Gaelic Athletic Association club based in Colligan, County Waterford, Ireland. The club enters teams in both GAA codes each year, which includes two adult hurling teams and two adult Gaelic football team in the Waterford County Championships. The club is known as Colligan when playing hurling and Emmets when playing Gaelic football. At underage, they are joined with Kilgobinet and are known as St Patrick's. At U21 level, they are joined with a few other small local clubs, Modeligo and Sliabh Cua–St Mary's from Touraneena, who are known as Comeragh Gaels.

The club is yet to win a senior county championship in either grade, although the club has had success at both other adults levels and at underage.

== Honours ==
- Waterford Intermediate Hurling Championship: 2
  - 1985, 1992
- Waterford Junior Hurling Championship: 2
  - 1960, 1984, 2022
- Waterford Junior Football Championship: 3
  - 1960, 2000, 2016

== Notable players ==
- Colin Dunford
