= Waterford Junior A Hurling Championship =

- Irish: Craobhchomórtas Iomána Shóisearach A Phort Láirge
- Code: Hurling
- Founded: 1924; 102 years ago
- Region: Waterford (GAA)
- No. of teams: 2
- Title holders: Mount Sion (1st title)
- First winner: Lismore
- Most titles: Lismore (7 titles)
- Sponsors: JJ Kavanagh & Sons
- Official website: Waterford GAA

The Waterford Junior A Hurling Championship (known for sponsorship reasons as the JJ Kavanagh & Sons Junior Hurling Championship and abbreviated to the Waterford JAHC) is an annual hurling competition organised by the Waterford County Board of the Gaelic Athletic Association since 1924 and contested by the divisional junior champions in the county of Waterford in Ireland. It is the fourth tier overall in the entire Waterford hurling championship system.

In its current format, the championship begins after the conclusion of the respective Eastern and Western divisional championships. Both divisional champions contest the final, usually at Walsh Park, to determine the county champions. The winner gains automatic promotion to the Waterford Intermediate Championship the following season.

Lismore are the most successful teams in the tournament's history, having won it seven times each. Mount Sion are the title holders after defeating Abbeyside by 2-21 to 1-18 in the 2026 final.

== History ==
The Waterford Junior Championship was established in 1924. For 40 years, the Waterford Junior Championship was the second tier championship in the Waterford hurling championship system. This changed in 1964 with the creation of the Waterford Intermediate Championship.

== Qualification ==
| Division | Championship | Qualifying teams |
|---|---|---|
| Eastern Board | Eastern Junior A Hurling Championship | Champions |
| Western Board | Western Junior A Hurling Championship | Champions |

== Qualification for subsequent competitions ==
From its inception in 2002, the Waterford JAHC champions automatically qualify for the Munster Club JHC. Geraldines were the first team to represent Waterford in the provincial series. Ballysaggart (2013), Modeligo (2014) and Ardmore (2017) are the only Waterford clubs to have won the Munster club title.

== List of finals ==
| Year | Winners | | Runners-up | | # |
| Year | Club | Score | Club | Score | # |
|---|---|---|---|---|---|
| 2026 | Mount Sion | 2-21 | Abbeyside | 1-18 | |
| 2025 | Kilrossanty | 1-17 | Ballygunner | 2-11 | |
| 2024 | Roanmore | 4-17 | Kilrossanty | 1-10 | |
| 2023 | Ardmore | 2-16 | Roanmore | 0-12 | |
| 2022 | Colligan Rockies | 3-16 | Ballygunner | 2-14 | |
| 2021 | Brickey Rangers | 3-18 | Mount Sion | 1-14 | |
| 2020 | Tramore | 3-08 | Colligan Rockies | 0-13 | |
| 2019 | St. Mary's | 1-11 | Ballydurn | 0-12 | |
| 2018 | Ballinameela | 0-21 | Tramore | 1-10 | |
| 2017 | Ardmore | 5-17 | Ballydurn | 0-09 | |
| 2016 | Ballyduff Lower | 2-14 | St. Mary's | 0-11 | |
| 2015 | Fenor | 1-12 | St. Mary's | 0-14 | |
| 2014 | Modeligo | 2-15 | Bonmahon | 0-08 | |
| 2013 | Ballysaggart | 1-18 | Tramore | 1-09 | |
| 2012 | Butlerstown | 2-11 | Geraldines | 0-05 | |
| 2011 | Ballinameela | 1-14 | Butlerstown | 0-09 | |
| 2010 | Ballydurn | 1-09 | Ballysaggart | 0-07 | |
| 2009 | Tourin/Glen Rovers | 1-15 | Kill | 1-12 | |
| 2008 | Modeligo | 3-05 | Fenor | 0-03 | |
| 2007 | Ballysaggart | 3-10 | Bonmahon | 1-08 | |
| 2006 | Lismore | 1-10 | Fenor | 1-08 | |
| 2005 | Brickey Rangers | 1-11 | Fenor | 0-10 | |
| 2004 | Tramore | 3-07 | Tourin | 1-09 | |
| 2003 | Kilgobinet | 0-12 | Tramore | 1-06 | |
| 2002 | Geraldines | 2-09 | Fenor | 1-09 | |
| 2001 | Ardmore | 0-17 | Fenor | 0-12 | |
| 2000 | Clashmore | 1-08 | Fenor | 1-05 | |
| 1999 | Lismore | 1-08 | Butlerstown | 1-05 | |
| 1998 | Passage | 1-07 | Geraldines | 1-06 | |
| 1997 | Ballyduff Lower | 2-12 | Geraldines | 4-05 | |
| 1996 | Ballygunner | 2-14 | Geraldines | 2-08 | |
| 1995 | Ferrybank | 3-20 | Lismore | 0-04 | |
| 1994 | Kill | 2-08 | Geraldines | 1-10 | |
| 1993 | Kilmacthomas | 1-11 | Clashmore | 2-05 | |
| 1992 | Ballysaggart | 2-08 | Kilmacthomas | 0-06 | |
| 1991 | Rinn O gCuanach | 3-06 | Kilmacthomas | 1-10 | |
| 1990 | Ballydurn | 1-07 | Rinn O gCuanach | 0-09 | |
| 1989 | St. Mary's | 1-06 | Ballydurn | 1-04 | |
| 1988 | Geraldines | 0-12 | Clonea | 2-05 | |
| 1987 | Stradbally | 3-04 | Roanmore | 2-06 | |
| 1986 | Kilgobinet | 1-10 | Tramore | 1-02 | |
| 1985 | Ballinameela | 0-10 | Fenor | 0-06 | |
| 1984 | Colligan Rockies | 2-19 | Fenor | 0-04 | |
| 1983 | Ballyduff Lower | 4-07 | Stradbally | 2-08 | |
| 1982 | Tramore | 2-10 | Colligan Rockies | 0-09 | |
| 1981 | Tallow | 1-12 | Tramore | 2-07 | |
| 1980 | Roanmore | 2-13 | Tallow | 0-03 | |
| 1979 | Ardmore | 3-06 | Fenor | 1-07 | |
| 1978 | St. Mary's | 0-16 | Rathgormack | 1-06 | |
| 1977 | Tourin | 3-06 | Rathgormack | 2-08 | |
| 1976 | Geraldines | 1-06 | Portlaw | 0-07 | |
| 1975 | Dungarvan | 2-11 | Portlaw | 0-07 | |
| 1974 | Stradbally | 1-10 | Mount Sion | 0-09 | |
| 1973 | Dunhill | 1-11 | Tourin | 2-06 | |
| 1972 | Ballysaggart | 3-05 | Mount Sion | 0-07 | |
| 1971 | Ballyduff Upper | 1-09 | Rathgormack | 2-04 | |
| 1970 | Clonea | 2-07 | Ballysaggart | 2-06 | |
| 1969 | Clashmore | 2-07 | Fenor | 1-04 | |
| 1968 | Ferrybank | 8-08 | Shamrocks | 1-03 | |
| 1967 | Lismore | 4-09 | Ballygunner | 2-03 | |
| 1966 | Kill | 4-10 | Abbeyside | 2-03 | |
| 1965 | Dunhill | 4-06 | Affane | 5-02 | |
| 1964 | St. Mollerans | 1-08 | Ardmore | 1-03 | |
| 1963 | Fourmilewater | 3-07 | De La Salle | 4-03 | |
| 1962 | Ballydurn | 3-15 | Fourmilewater | 2-02 | |
| 1961 | Ballyduff Lower | 4-04 | The Nire | 3-03 | |
| 1960 | Colligan Rockies | 4-03 | Ballyduff Lower | 2-06 | |
| 1959 | Brickey Rangers | 9-02 | Gael Óg | 3-06 | |
| 1958 | Ferrybank | 6-05 | Colligan Rockies | 2-03 | |
| 1957 | Ballygunner | 7-08 | Lismore | 3-03 | |
| 1956 | Geraldines | 4-12 | Ballygunner | 2-05 | |
| 1955 | Fourmilewater | 3-06 | Ballyduff Lower | 3-04 | |
| 1954 | De La Salle | 3-01 | Fourmilewater | 2-03 | |
| 1953 | Ballyduff Upper | 5-04 | Mount Sion | 3-02 | |
| 1952 | Dunhill | 2-04 | Ballyduff Upper | 0-03 | |
| 1951 | Éire Óg | 3-10 | Dunhill | 2-04 | |
| 1950 | St. Augustine's | 2-04 | Dunhill | 1-03 | |
| 1949 | Tourin | 5-07 | Portlaw | 0-00 | |
| 1948 | Cappoquin | 7-06 | Mount Sion | 1-01 | |
| 1947 | St.Patrick's, Knockanore | 4-02 | St. Molleran's | 4-01 | |
| 1946 | Butlerstown | 3-03 | St. Augustine's | 1-02 | |
| 1945 | Brickey Rangers | 2-01 | Butlerstown | 1-02 | |
| 1944 | Cappoquin | 4-04 | Clonea | 3-03 | |
| 1943 | P.H Pearce's Ferrybank | 6-03 | Tourin | 3-04 | |
| 1942 | Erin's Hope (Kilkanavee) | 3-05 | Cappoquin | 3-03 | |
| 1941 | Tourin | 2-02 | Ballytruckle | 1-02 | |
| 1940 | Lismore | 5-03 | Erin's Own | 2-01 | |
| 1939 | Clonea | 3-01 | Dungarvan | 0-05 | |
| 1938 | Lismore | 6-01 | St Stephens | 3-01 | |
| 1937 | Passage | 6-02 | Ballyduff Upper | 3-00 | |
| 1936 | Lismore | | Clonea | | |
| 1935 | Portlaw | | Lismore | | |
| 1934 | Erin's Own | 7-04 | Dungarvan | 7-01 | |
| 1933 | De La Salle | 1-04 | Dungarvan | 0-04 | |
| 1932 | Dunhill | 4-02 | Dungarvan | 0-06 | |
| 1931 | Éire Óg Dungarvan | 2-02 | Dunhill | 2-01 | |
| 1930 | Tallow | 2-02 | Ballytruckle | 1-01 | |
| 1929 | Clonea | | Dungarvan | | |
| 1928 | Erin's Own | 5-01 | Fourmilewater | 4-03 | |
| 1927 | Dungarvan | 4-02 | Ferrybank | 0-00 | |
| 1926 | Erin's Own | 6-00 | Lismore | 1-03 | |
| 1925 | Tallow | 2-02 | Ballyduff Lower | 2-00 | |
| 1924 | Lismore | 9-00 | O Rourke's | 2-00 | |

== Roll of honour ==
| Lismore | 1924, 1936, 1938, 1940, 1967, 1999, 2006 |
| Ardmore | 1979, 2001, 2017, 2023 |
| Brickey Rangers | 1945, 1959, 2005, 2021 |
| Ballyduff Lower | 1961, 1983, 1997, 2016 |
| Ballysaggart | 1972, 1992, 2007, 2013 |
| Geraldines | 1956, 1976, 1988, 2002 |
| Dunhill | 1932, 1952, 1965, 1973 |
| Colligan Rockies | 1960, 1984, 2022 |
| Tramore | 1982, 2004, 2020 |
| St. Mary's | 1978, 1989, 2019 |
| Ballinameela | 1985, 2011, 2018 |
| Ballydurn | 1962, 1990, 2010 |
| Ferrybank | 1958, 1968, 1995 |
| Tallow | 1925, 1930, 1981 |
| Tourin | 1941, 1949, 1977 |
| Clonea | 1929, 1939, 1970 |
| Erin's Own | 1926, 1928, 1934 |
| Roanmore | 1980, 2024 |
| Modeligo | 2008, 2014 |
| Butlerstown | 1946, 2012 |
| Kilgobinet | 1986, 2003 |
| Clashmore | 1969, 2000 |
| Passage | 1937, 1998 |
| Ballygunner | 1957, 1996 |
| Kill | 1966, 1994 |
| Stradbally | 1974, 1987 |
| Dungarvan | 1927, 1975 |
| Ballyduff Upper | 1953, 1971 |
| Fourmilewater | 1955, 1963 |
| De La Salle | 1933, 1954 |
| Cappoquin | 1944, 1948 |
| Mount Sion | 2026 |
| Kilrossanty | 2025 |
| Fenor | 2015 |
| Tourin/Glen Rovers | 2009 |
| Kilmacthomas | 1993 |
| Rinn O gCuanach | 1991 |
| St. Mollerans | 1964 |
| Éire Óg | 1951 |
| St. Augustine's | 1950 |
| St.Patrick's, Knockanore | 1947 |
| P.H Pearce's Ferrybank | 1943 |
| Erin's Hope (Kilkanavee) | 1942 |
| Portlaw | 1935 |
| Éire Óg Dungarvan | 1931 |

== See also ==
- Waterford Senior Hurling Championship (Tier 1)
- Waterford Premier Intermediate Hurling Championship (Tier 2)
- Waterford Intermediate Hurling Championship(Tier 3)
- Waterford Junior B Hurling Championship (Tier 5)
- Waterford Junior C Hurling Championship (Tier 6
