= Gavin O'Brien =

Irish hurler

Personal information
- Native name: Gabhán Ó Briain (Irish)
- Born: 10 March 1993 (age 33) Waterford, Ireland
- Occupation: Academic
- Height: 1.78 m (5 ft 10 in)

Sport
- Sport: Hurling
- Position: Left corner forward
Club
- Years: Club
- 2010-: Roanmore
College
- Years: College
- Waterford IT
College titles
- Fitzgibbon titles: 1
Inter-county
- Years: County
- 2012-: Waterford
Inter-county titles
- NHL: 1

Gavin O'Brien (born 10 March 1993) is an Irish hurler who currently plays as a left corner-forward for the Waterford senior team.

O'Brien made his first appearance for the team during the 2012 National League and became a Waterford regular during the 2012 championship. A former member of the Waterford minor team, he is also a member of the Waterford under-21 team.

At club level O'Brien plays with Roanmore. He plays in a centre forward role or a midfield role for his club. According to former Waterford team captain Brian Flannery, Gavin is very consistent as a player.
