= Clashmore =

Village in County Waterford, Ireland

Clashmore Clais Mhór
- Village
- Location in Ireland
- Coordinates: 52°00′34″N 7°49′10″W
- Country: Ireland
- Province: Munster
- County: County Waterford
- Established: 632

Population (2022)
  - Total: 280
- Time zone: UTC+0 (WET)
  - Summer (DST): UTC-1 (IST (WEST))

Clashmore (Irish: Clais Mhór) is a village, townland and civil parish in west County Waterford, Ireland. The village and surrounding district are very low-lying, as the name Clais Mhór (meaning "the great hollow or trench") implies; elsewhere the land is rather hilly. It is also a parish in the Roman Catholic Diocese of Waterford and Lismore.

== Distillery ==
It is the site of a distillery built by Lord Hastings the thirteenth Earl of Huntingdon which operated from c. 1835 to 1840, producing 20,000 gallons of whiskey annually. The mill was then used until c. 1897 as a flour mill. The distillery chimney is unique in Ireland as the only one which spans the river which propelled the mill.

Clashmore is now home to several small pubs and a local shop.

== Clashmore House ==
Clashmore House was a mansion built but never completed on the site that is currently occupied by St Mochua's well.

== Sport ==
The local Gaelic Athletic Association club is Clashmore-Kinsalebeg GAA.

== See also ==
- List of towns and villages in Ireland
