= Shamrocks GAA (Waterford) =

Gaelic Athletic Association club

Shamrocks
- Na Seamróga
- Founded: 1953
- County: Waterford
- Colours: Green and white
- Grounds: John F. Kennedy Park

Playing kits
Standard colours

Senior Club Championships
	All Ireland	Munster champions	Waterford champions
Football:	0	0	0
Hurling:	0	0	0

Shamrocks GAA is a Gaelic Athletic Association club located in the village of Knockanore, County Waterford, Ireland. The club fields teams in both hurling and Gaelic football.

== History ==
Located in the village of Knockanore in West Waterford, Shamrocks GAA Club was founded in November 1953 after a series of challenge matches were played to see if there was an appetite for creating a new club in the area. The club was initially called Bride Rovers as many of the players were from the Bride Valley, however, the name was quickly changed to Shamrocks, with each leaf representing the three united parishes of Knockanore, Glendine and Kilwatermoy. The club spent the early part of its existence operating in the junior grade. Shamrocks had its greatest successes at intermediate level, winning Waterford IHC titles in 1972, 1982 and 1999. A juvenile section known as Cois Bhride was formed in December 2000 following an amalgamation of Tallow and Shamrocks.

== Honours ==
- Waterford Intermediate Hurling Championship: 1972, 1982, 1999

== Notable players ==
- Eoin Murphy: Munster SHC-winner (2002, 2004, 2007, 2010)
