= Tallow GAA =

Irish Gaelic Athletic Association club

- CLG Tulach an Iarainn
- Founded: 1887
- County: Waterford
- Colours: Blue; Gold
- Grounds: Páirc Eamonn de Paor
- Coordinates: 52°05′40″N 7°59′49″W

Playing kits
Standard colours

Senior Club Championships
	All Ireland	Munster champions	Waterford champions
Hurling:	-	-	4

Tallow GAA (Irish: CLG Tulach an Iarainn) is a Gaelic Athletic Association club based in Tallow, in west County Waterford, Ireland. The club has won the Waterford Senior Hurling Championship four times, first in 1936 and again in 1980, 1984 and 1985. As of 2010, Tallow had four players on the Waterford county panel: James Murray, Aidan Kearney, Mark O' Brien and Thomas Ryan.

Tallow GAA's ground, Páirc Eamonn de Paor, is named after the former Waterford hurler and coach Ned Power who taught in the local school through the 1960s, 1970s and 1980s. Power played for and coached a number of Tallow teams in both hurling and football. He died in November 2007. In 2026, Tallow GAA was one of three west Waterford GAA clubs, alongside Shamrocks GAA in Knockanore and Lismore GAA, to receive a €50,000 donation from American billionaire Mark Zuckerberg and his wife Priscilla Chan, who had recently acquired nearby Strancally Castle.

== Underage ==
Tallow is amalgamated with Shamrocks and play under the name of Cois Bhride for the County and Western division Minor and Juvenile Championship. Both clubs run separate teams for each other underage competition.

== Honours ==
- Waterford Senior Hurling Championships (4): 1936, 1980, 1984, 1985
- Waterford Intermediate Hurling Championships (2): 1974, 1987
- Waterford Junior Hurling Championships (3): 1925, 1930, 1981
- Waterford Under-21 Hurling Championships: (7): 1972, 1976, 1977, 1983, 2002, 2003, 2008(b)
- Waterford Minor Hurling Championships (8): 1938, 1967, 1971, 1975, 1980, 1986, 1997, 2007(b)
- Waterford Intermediate Football Championship (1): 1976
- Waterford Junior Football Championships (2): 1975, 2010
