= Knockanore =

Village in County Waterford, Ireland

Knockanore Cnoc an Óir
- Village
- Location in Ireland
- Coordinates: 52°03′12″N 7°53′28″W
- Country: Ireland
- Province: Munster
- County: County Waterford
- Time zone: UTC+0 (WET)
  - Summer (DST): UTC-1 (IST (WEST))

Knockanore (Irish: Cnoc an Óir) is a rural village and townland in County Waterford, situated approximately 9 miles (15 km) from neighbouring towns Youghal (County Cork) and Tallow (County Waterford).The village is located on a designated scenic routeway.

== History ==
Knockanore is a townland in the ancient parish of Kilcockan. The ancient parishes of Templemichael, Kilwatermoy and Kilcockan were merged into a single union called Knockanore. The Roman Catholic parish of Templemichael is now known as Glendine; however, a Church of Ireland church called Templemichael still exists.

== Toponymy ==
The name itself is derived from the Irish Cnoc an Fhómhair, or Cnoc an Óir, which translates as "the hill of autumn/gold", reflecting the many yellow furze bushes which once were plentiful in the area.

== Size ==
The village itself is officially located within one linear mile, reaching from the townland of Kilcockan to the south to just above the hub of the village itself, on the northern side. Local facilities include a public house 'The Shamrock Inn,' a post office, a Catholic church and a national school. A community hall sits beside the school and was officially opened in May 2009. It caters for various community functions and events, as well as private school assemblies and games.

== United Parishes ==
Knockanore is one of the 'United Parishes,' which collectively span an area wider than the village itself. The other parishes are Glendine, which reach southwards almost to Youghal. To the northern side lies Kilwatermoy, which reaches almost to Tallow. As a result, the parish is served by three churches, one at each of these locations. The above population figure accounts for the number of people within these three parishes.

== Community ==
Knockanore is home to the Shamrocks Hurling Club, which is at intermediate level in the West Waterford division. The club is served by the John F. Kennedy park in Knockanore, which was first opened in 1963 and later refurbished in the last decade.

Knockanore also hosts an annual fete organised by the local Knockanore Glendine Kilwatermoy Community Council, in the John F Kennedy Community Park, which usually takes place in late June or early July. Local stalls are complemented by a vintage display, followed by entertainment in the Shamrock Inn. The festival runs for a three days, and up until 2006, hosted an annual 'Choosing and Crowning of Festival Queen', a pageant whereby the festival queen is chosen to represent the festival for that year. The parish also has a Heritage and Historical group.

The Blackwater Ladies Club, based in the area, meet regularly in the Shamrock Inn. Other informal groups such as set-dancing take place for both adults and children.

Local businesses include Knockanore Kabins, a portable cabin manufacturer, Baldwin's Farmhouse Ice Cream and Knockanore Farmhouse Cheese, situated on the farm of a local dairy farmer. Also in the area is Faulkner's Craft Shop.

Another annual event is the local Ploughing Championship, which is usually held in or around the village in late September of each year. The various classes in the competition mean young and old compete, including a vintage class and a farmerette class.

== See also ==
- List of towns and villages in Ireland
