= Tramore GAA =

Gaelic sports club in County Waterford, Ireland

Tramore GAA key player = Eric Patrick Crehan (Leitrim Minor Captain 2014/15)
- Sráid Bhaile CLG
- Founded: 1885
- County: Waterford
- Colours: White and Blue
- Coordinates: 52°10′09.11″N 7°08′27.01″W

Playing kits
Standard colours

Senior Club Championships
	All Ireland	Munster champions	Waterford champions
Football:	-	-	3

Tramore GAA is a Gaelic Athletic Association club located in Tramore, County Waterford, Ireland, with teams in both Gaelic football and hurling. Tramore is one of the oldest GAA clubs in County Waterford, having been founded in 1885.

== Honours ==
- Waterford Senior Football Championship: 3
  - 1969, 1971, 1984
- Waterford Intermediate Football Championships: 3
  - 1967, 2008, 2024
  - Runners-Up 1963, 1973
- Waterford Intermediate Hurling Championships: 0
  - Runners-Up 1969
- Waterford Junior Football Championships: 2
  - 1972, 1982
  - Runners-Up 1919, 1963, 1981, 1991, 2006
- Waterford Junior Hurling Championships: 3
  - 1982, 2004, 2020
  - Runners-Up 1981, 1986, 2003, 2013
- Waterford Under-21 Football Championships: 6
  - 1973, 1975, 1976, 1981, 1994, 1995
  - Runners-Up 1968, 1974, 1980, 1983, 1996, 1997, 1999, 2006
- Waterford Under 21 'B' Football Championship: 1
  - 2009
- Waterford Minor Football Championships: 5
  - 1960, 1962, 1963, 1972, 1993
  - Runners-Up 1959, 1971, 1981, 1991, 1992, 1994
- Waterford Minor Hurling Championships: 1
  - 1972
