= Brickey Rangers GAA =

Gaelic games club in County Waterford, Ireland

- Rodaithe na Brice
- Founded: 1896
- County: Waterford
- Nickname: Brickeys
- Colours: Amber and black
- Grounds: Bushy Park
- Coordinates: 52°05′20″N 7°41′27″W

Playing kits
Home Kit	Change Kit

Senior Club Championships
	All Ireland	Munster champions	Waterford champions
Football:	0	0	1

Brickey Rangers (Irish: Rodaithe na Brice) is a GAA club 5 km west of Dungarvan, County Waterford, Ireland. They cater for Gaelic football, camogie and hurling. Their home ground is Bushy Park, which was opened in 1984.

The club won the Waterford Senior Football Championship, on one occasion, in 1963. They have finished runners-up on five occasions, the last being in 1960.

== History ==
=== Formation and development ===
Founded in 1896 as Brickey Rangers (named for the River Brickey), the club did not have their first game until 1917. To determine the cost of a football, it was decided to go door-to-door throughout the Valley. Members of the club collected money from locals in the area. The first jersey's worn by the club were all white. The first game played by the club was against Modeligo in Dempsey's field Dungarvan GAA. The club captured their only Waterford Senior Football Championship in 1963. They have been relegated from the senior ranks numerous times. In 1980, 1986 and 2014 they regained promotion to the Waterford Senior Football Championship by winning the Waterford Intermediate Football Championship.

=== Grounds ===
While the club was established in 1896, it did not have a permanent base until 1984 when six acres were purchased from the Bon Sauveur Sisters at Carriglea. This ground, approximately 5 km from Dungarvan, was subsequently named Bushy Park. In 2004, an additional adjoining 5.25 acres was purchased to provide a second full-size playing pitch and training area. In later years, they developed the facilities further with the addition of a hurling wall court, extended the club pavilion/additional dressing rooms, floodlighting, and additional car parking facilities.

=== 21st century ===
In 2014, the First XV won the Western and County Waterford Intermediate Football Championship and were Waterford GAA representatives in the Munster Intermediate Club Football Championship. The Minor football team won the Western A championship. The Brickey First XV Hurling team remained in the Waterford Intermediate Hurling Championship.

In the 2015 season, the newly repromoted Brickey football team made it out of the group stages and into the quarter finals against The Nire, however, they were knocked out of the competition. The Under-21 football team won the Western B championship. The Minor football team won the western B championship and finished county B runner-ups. The Under-21 hurling team won the Western B championship. The Brickey First XV hurling team remained in the Waterford Intermediate Hurling Championship.

In 2016, the Brickey's first XV football squad suffered from second season syndrome and narrowly avoided relegation back to the Waterford Intermediate Football Championship. For the first time in a number of seasons, the u21 team appeared in the Western A division, being knocked out at the Quarter Final stages. The u21 hurling team were knocked out of the Western B after one game. The Brickey First XV hurling team remained in the Waterford Intermediate Hurling Championship, however launched a challenge for the Western title.

== Honours ==
=== Football ===
- Waterford Senior Football Championship (1): 1963
- West Waterford Under-21 Football Championship (2): 2012, 2015
- West Waterford Minor B Football Championship (3): 2013, 2014, 2015
- Waterford Junior Football Championship (3): 1927, 1941, 1945
- Waterford Intermediate Football Championship (4): 1980, 1986, 2006, 2014

=== Hurling ===
- Waterford Intermediate Hurling Championship (1): 2023
- Waterford Junior Hurling Championship (3): 1944, 1959, 2005
