= Lismore GAA =

Gaelic games club in County Waterford, Ireland

- Lios Mór
- County: Waterford
- Colours: Yellow and Black Hoops
- Grounds: Castle Grounds, Lismore
- Coordinates: 52°08′06.87″N 7°56′40.90″W

Playing kits
Standard colours

Senior Club Championships
	All Ireland	Munster champions	Waterford champions
Football:	-	-	4
Hurling:	-	-	3

Lismore GAA is a Gaelic Athletic Association club based in Lismore, County Waterford, Ireland. The club enters teams in both GAA codes each year, which includes two adult hurling teams and one adult Gaelic football team in the Waterford County Championships. The club has won county titles in both hurling and football, but in recent history the club has been mainly concerned with the game of hurling. The club's camogie teams have also had several successes.

== History ==
The club has won the County Senior Hurling Championship 3 times. In the first, in 1925, the club beating Erin's Own by 4-2 to 2-3. The club had to wait 66 years before their next success in 1991, in which they beat Mount Sion by 5-7 to 1-5. The third win was in 1993, when Lismore beat Passage by 0-8 to 0-7.

While, in the late 20th and early 21st century, Lismore did not win another county title, they came close on a number of occasions, including in the 1996, 2001 and 2009 county finals.

2016 saw Lismore finally win another county title, this time in the Intermediate grade. Following relegation from the senior ranks the previous year after 47 years as senior club, they won the Western Intermediate hurling final beating Modeligo 2-15 to 1-11. Dunhill were defeated in the county final 5-19 to 1-7. Then the trip to play Cork champions Bandon saw Lismore win by 2-20 to 1-12. Next up were Tipperary side Newport and a close game was won 1-15 to 1-12. 2016 was rounded off by being crowned Munster champions with victory over Kerry senior winners Kilmoyley 2-14 to 0-13.

== Underage ==
For all underage competitions, up to Under-21, Lismore are amalgamated with Ballysaggart GAA. The amalgamated team is known as St. Carthages.

== Honours ==
- Waterford Senior Hurling Championships: 3
  - 1925, 1991, 1993
- Waterford Senior Football Championships: 4
  - 1899, 1901, 1902, 1911
- Munster Intermediate Club Hurling Championships 1
  - 2016
- Waterford Intermediate Hurling Championships: 2
  - 1969, 2016
- Waterford Intermediate Football Championships: 1
  - 2000
- Waterford Junior Hurling Championships: 7
  - 1924(?), 1936, 1938, 1940, 1967, 1999, 2006
- Waterford Junior Football Championships: 2
  - 1911, 1995
- Waterford Under-21 Hurling Championship 8
  - 1967, 1986, 1990, 1992, 1993, 1996, 1997, 1998
- Waterford Minor Hurling Championships: 8
  - 1935 (as St. Carthage's), 1939 (as St. Carthage's), 1985, 1987, 1988, 1990, 1995, 2011 (as St. Carthage's)

== Notable players ==
- Dan Shanahan - 2004, 2006, 2007^{(Hurler of the Year)}
- Maurice Shanahan - 2015
