= Dungarvan GAA =

Gaelic sports club in County Waterford, Ireland

Dungarvan GAA Club
- Dún Garbháin CLCG
- Founded: 1885
- County: Waterford
- Colours: Royal Blue and White
- Grounds: Pairc Dungarbhain
- Coordinates: 52°05′05.27″N 7°38′24.34″W

Playing kits
Standard colours

Senior Club Championships
	All Ireland	Munster champions	Waterford champions
Football:	-	-	22
Hurling:	-	-	7

Dungarvan GAA is a GAA club based in Dungarvan, County Waterford, Ireland. The club participates in both hurling and Gaelic football. The club currently heads the roll of honour in the Waterford Senior Football Championship with a total of 19 wins.

The club attracted significant national attention in 2020 when a player competed in the final of the Waterford Intermediate Football Championship despite awaiting the result of a COVID-19 test, which returned a positive result. This led to Dungarvan (that year's competition-winning club) being stripped of the title.

== Notable players ==
- Jamie Nagle

== Honours ==
- Waterford Senior Hurling Championships: 7
  - 1890, 1908, 1917, 1920, 1923, 1926, 1941
- Waterford Senior Football Championships: 19
  - 1892, 1893, 1908,1916,1926, 1927, 1928, 1929, 1930, 1937, 1938, 1945, 1946, 1947, 1948, 1954, 1990, 1991, 1992
- Waterford Intermediate Hurling Championships: 3
  - 1978, 1986, 2009
- Waterford Intermediate Football Championships: 3
  - 1985, 2011, 2017
- Waterford Junior Hurling Championships: 1
  - 1975
- Waterford Junior Football Championships: 3
  - 1909, 1914, 1973
- Waterford Under-21 Hurling Championships: 1
  - 1987
- Waterford Under-21 Football Championships: 3
  - 1985, 1987, 2010
- Waterford Minor Hurling Championships: 12
  - 1929, 1931, 1940, 1941, 1942, 1943, 1944, 1951, 1966, 1983, 1984, 2012
- Waterford Minor Football Championships: 9
  - 1928, 1932, 1933, 1961, 1983, 1984, 1991, 1992, 2013
