= Ballysaggart GAA =

Gaelic games club in County Waterford, Ireland

Ballysaggart
- Baile na Saggart
- Founded: 1885
- County: Waterford
- Colours: Blue and Navy hoops
- Grounds: The Scroithlim
- Coordinates: 52°11′00.69″N 7°59′28.09″W

Playing kits
Standard colours

Senior Club Championships
	All Ireland	Munster champions	Waterford champions
Football:	-	-	1

Ballysaggart GAA is a Gaelic Athletic Association club based in Ballysaggart, County Waterford, Ireland. The club enters teams in hurling each year, which includes 2 adult hurling teams in the Waterford Senior Hurling Championship and the Western Junior Hurling “C” Championship, and had briefly returned to participating in Gaelic football entering a team in the West Waterford Junior Football Championship in 2015, after a lapse of ten years. Ballysaggart has no underage teams. Instead the club is amalgamated with Lismore GAA for underage teams and play as Naomh Carthach.

Ballysaggart won the first competition organised by the GAA, the 1885 Waterford Senior Football Championship. In 2020, 135 years later, the club played their inaugural hurling campaign at the senior grade.

== Honours ==
- Waterford Senior Football Championships: 1
  - 1885
- Waterford Intermediate Hurling Championships: 1
  - 2019
- Munster Intermediate Club Hurling Championship Runners-up
  - 2019
- Waterford Junior Hurling Championships: 4
  - 1972, 1992, 2007, 2013
- Munster Junior Club Hurling Championships: 1
  - 2013

== Notable players ==
- Shane Bennett
- Stephen Bennett
- Kieran Bennett
- Jack Roche
- Davy Fitz's personal assistant
