= Ferrybank GAA =

Gaelic games club on outskirts of Waterford, Ireland

Ferrybank GAA Club
- Pórt Mór CLG
- Founded: 1950
- County: Waterford
- Colours: Green and White
- Coordinates: 52°15′59″N 7°05′46″W

Playing kits
Standard colours

Senior Club Championships
	All Ireland	Munster champions	Waterford champions
Hurling:	-	-	3

Ferrybank GAA is a Gaelic Athletic Association (GAA) club based in the village of Ferrybank, which is located in both County Waterford and County Kilkenny, Ireland. However, the club participates in Waterford GAA competitions. It is situated in the suburb of Ferrybank on the north bank of the River Suir. Uniquely, one set of the field's goalposts lies in Waterford and the other in Kilkenny.

There have been Gaelic games played in Ferrybank since the first team known as the Davis's was formed in the early 1890s. The club, under its present guise, was formed in 1950, and celebrated its 50th anniversary in the year 2000.

The club caters for boys and girls from the age of 5 years and upwards. At juvenile level, the club were U-14 and U-16 County Champions in hurling in 2007 and teams are fielded at all juvenile grades. At adult level in hurling, the club fields teams at senior and junior levels. In Gaelic football, the club were Waterford Junior Champions in 2007.

== Honours ==
- Waterford Senior Hurling Championship (3): 1915, 1916, 1919
- Waterford Premier Intermediate Hurling Championship (1): 2023
- Waterford Intermediate Hurling Championship (1): 1968
- Waterford Intermediate Football Championship (1): 1978
