= Affane Cappoquin GAA =

Gaelic games club in County Waterford, Ireland

Affane Cappoquin GAA Club
- Áth Meadhon Ceapach Choinn CLG
- Founded: 1969
- County: Waterford
- Colours: Red and Black
- Grounds: sportsfield
- Coordinates: 52°08′40.88″N 7°51′03.23″W

Playing kits
Standard colours

Senior Club Championships
	All Ireland	Munster champions	Waterford champions
Football:	-	-	1

Affane Cappoquin GAA is a Gaelic Athletic Association club based in Cappoquin, County Waterford, Ireland. The club was formed in 1969 with the merging of Affane GAA and Cappoquin GAA. At present, the team is called Cappoquin when playing hurling and Affane when playing gaelic football.

Its finest hour in football came in 1974 when, having beaten Stradbally in the quarter-final and The Nire in the semi-final, Affane defeated Dunhill by 1–8 to 0–6 to win its only Waterford Senior Football Championship title. Affane went on to represent Waterford in the Munster Senior Club Football Championship, losing to Austin Stacks of Kerry. As Cappoquin, the club has reached one Waterford Senior Hurling Championship final, losing to Mount Sion in 1956. Their most recent success came in 2014 winning the Waterford Intermediate Hurling Championship beating St Saviours 2–19 to 2–11 in the county final. They also won the Munster championship beating Limerick champions Bruff 1-11-0-13.

The club grounds, located on the Dungarvan Road, hosted the 1945 All-Ireland Senior Camogie Championship Final where Antrim beat Waterford.

== Honours ==
- Waterford Senior Football Championship, 1974 / Runners up 1973
- Waterford Intermediate Hurling Championship Winners 1976, 2014 / Runners up 1970, 1995
- West Waterford Intermediate Hurling Championship Winners 1976, 1995, 2014
- Munster Intermediate Club Hurling Championship Winners 2014
- Waterford Intermediate Football Championship Winners (2) 1966, 1992
- Waterford Junior Hurling Championship Winners (2) 1944, 1948 | Runners-Up 1942, 1965
- Waterford Under-21 Hurling Championship Winners 1970, 1980 | Runners-Up 2008, 2011, 2012
- Waterford Under-21 Football Championship Winners 1972 / Runners-Up 1971, 1973, 1981
- Waterford Minor Hurling Championship Winners 1978 | Runners-Up 1945, 1946, 1947, 1956, 1969, 1977, 2006
- Waterford Minor Football Championship Winners 1934 (as Blackwater Rovers), 1947, 1978 | Runners-Up 1977
