= 2015–16 Harty Cup =

Hurling tournament

2015–16 Dr Harty Cup
- Dates: 13 October 2015 – 20 February 2016
- Teams: 18
- Champions: Ardscoil Rís (4th title); Peter Casey (captain); Nathan Fox (captain); Niall Moran (manager)
- Runners-up: Our Lady's Secondary School; Anthony Ryan (captain); Tom Byrnes (manager)

Tournament statistics
- Matches played: 39
- Goals scored: 103 (2.64 per match)
- Points scored: 1010 (25.9 per match)
- Top scorer(s): Stephen Condon (2-35)

The 2015–16 Dr Harty Cup was the 96th staging of the Harty Cup since its establishment in hurling by the Munster Council of Gaelic Athletic Association in 1918. The group stage placings were released on 19 May 2015. The competition ran from 13 October 2015 to 20 February 2016.

Thurles CBS unsuccessfully defended its title in the knockout stage.

Ardscoil Rís won the Harty Cup final on 20 February 2016 at MacDonagh Park in Nenagh, against Our Lady's Secondary School, 0–11 to 0–08, in what was their first ever meeting in the final for its fourth successive Harty Cup title overall (after a hiatus since its last title in 2014.

St Colman's College's Stephen Condon was the top scorer with 2-35.

== Group A ==
=== Group A table ===
Knockout stage

Team	Matches				Score			Pts
Team	Pld	W	D	L	For	Against	Diff	Pts
Ardscoi Rís	4	4	0	0	87	44	43	8
De La Salle College	4	2	1	1	68	59	9	5
Midleton CBS	4	1	2	1	60	47	13	4
Blackwater CS	4	1	1	2	53	63	-10	3
Hamilton High School	4	0	0	4	34	89	-55	0

=== Group A results ===
14 October 2015 Round 1	Ardscoil Rís	4-22 - 0-09	Hamilton High School	Mallow GAA Complex
	C Moriarty 2-3, P O'Loughlin 1-3, P Casey 0-6, J Flynn 1-2, B Ryan 0-4, C Boylan 0-2, I Considine 0-2.	Report	C Dinneen 0-3, C Maguire 0-3, E Buckley 0-2, A Lyons 0-1.

14 October 2015 Round 1	De La Salle College Waterford	1-20 - 1-13	Blackwater Community School	Fraher Field
		Report

4 November 2015 Round 2	Ardscoil Rís	1-09 - 0-10	Midleton CBS	Cahir Grounds
	P O’Loughlin 0-6 4F, C Moriarty 1-1, P Casey 0-2.	Report	J Beausang 0-9 (8F), J Looney 0-1.

4 November 2015 Round 2	De La Salle College Waterford	1-17 - 0-08	Hamilton High School	Clashmore Grounds
	T Douglas 1-7 (2fs, 1 65’); D Power 0-3; E Daly, E Meaney, M Mahony 0-2 each; H Ruddle 0-1.	Report	C Dineen 0-5 (4fs, 1 65’); A Lyons, E Buckley, C Butler 0-1 each.

18 November 2015 Round 3	Midleton CBS	3-15 - 1-06	Hamilton High School	Ballincollig Grounds
	J Beausang (1-6, 3 frees), J Looney (1-1), S O’Leary Hayes (0-4), J McDonald (1-0), L Gosnell (0-2), G Manley (free) and L O’Shea (0-1 each).	Report	C Dinneen (1-1, 1-0 pen, one free), S O’Regan (0-3 frees), T Kearney and C Butler (0-1 each).

18 November 2015 Round 3	Ardscoil Rís	1-15 - 2-06	Blackwater Community School	Seán Treacy Park
	P O'Loughlin 1-3, C Moriarty 0-5, C Boylan 0-4, P Casey 0-2.	Report

2 December 2015 Round 4	Blackwater Community School	2-08 - 0-14	Midleton CBS	Carriganore Complex
	A Casey 1-0, B O'Brien 1-0, R Grey 0-3, J Pender 0-3, E Murray 0-1, I Daly 0-1.		J Beausang 0-6, S O'Leary-Hayes 0-3, C Ruddy 0-2, L Gosnell 0-1, L O'Shea 0-1, J Looney 0-1.

3 December 2015 Round 4	Ardscoil Rís	4-11 - 1-10	De La Salle College Waterford	Boherlahan Grounds
	C Boylan 2-3, J McInerny 2-0, P O’Loughlin 0-4 (3F), P Casey 0-2, D Fitzgerald 0-1, B Ryan 0-1.	Report	T Douglas 1-4 (1-3F), D Power 0-2.

9 December 2015 Round 5	Hamilton High School	1-05 - 1-08	Blackwater Community School	Killeagh Grounds
		Report

16 December 2015 Round 5	De La Salle College Waterford	0-12 - 0-12	Midleton CBS	Carriganore Complex
	H Ruddle 0-5 (4fs); T Douglas 0-3 (3fs); E Daly, D Coady, M Costigan, M Mahony 0-1 each.	Report	J Beausang (2fs), K Moynihan 0-3 each; J Looney 0-2; L O’Shea, L Gosnell, C Ruddy, B McCarthy 0-1 each.

== Group B ==
=== Group B table ===
Knockout stage

Team	Matches				Score			Pts
Team	Pld	W	D	L	For	Against	Diff	Pts
Our Lady's SS	4	4	0	0	116	56	60	8
St Francis College	4	3	0	1	102	69	33	6
Charleville CBS	4	1	0	3	64	70	-6	2
Gaelcholáiste Mhuire AG	4	1	0	3	63	96	-33	2
Pobalscoil na Tríonóide	4	1	0	3	51	105	-54	2

=== Group B results ===
14 October 2015 Round 1	St Francis College	3-23 - 1-14	Gaelcholáiste Mhuire AG	Mayfield Grounds
	E O'Brien 1-5, D O'Flaherty 1-3, B Turnbull 0-6, D Andrews 1-0, S Cormack 0-4, K O'Donovan 0-2, S Powter 0-2, J O'Sullivan 0-1.		É Ó Síocháin 1-5, D Ó Conaing 0-4, C Ó hAinfin 0-4, D Braham 0-1.

14 October 2015 Round 1	Our Lady's Secondary School	0-20 - 1-15	Charleville CBS	Childers Road
	J Bergin 0-10f. S Nolan 0-3 P Bergin 0-2, A O’Meara 0-2, B McGrath 0-1f, J Kelly 0-1, R Natkaniec 0-1.	Report	P O’Loughlan 0-7 (0-5f. 0-1 ’65) J Barry 1-3 (0-1f) P J Herr 0 -2, A Fitzgerald 0-1, J Geary 0-1, S Griffin 0-1f.

4 November 2015 Round 2	St Francis College	4-21 - 2-08	Pobalscoil na Tríonóide	Páirc Séamus de Barra
	S Powter 2-2, E O'Brien 1-2, C Cormack 0-5, J Holland 0-5, J O'Sullivan 0-4, S Hilliard 1-0, B Turnbull 0-2, D O'Flaherty 0-1.	Report	P Prendergast 1-2, D O'Connell 0-4, K Kelly-Budds 1-0, J O'Rourke 0-1, K Murphy 0-1.

11 November 2015 Round 2	Charleville CBS	1-15 - 0-15	Gaelcholáiste Mhuire AG	Páirc Mac Gearailt
	S Griffin (1-5, one free), J Barry (0-7, one free), P O’Loughlin (0-2 frees), PJ Herr (0-1).	Report	C Ó hAinfin (0-7, three frees, one 65m), E Ó Neill and E Ó Siocháin (0-3 each), D Bratham and B Ó Murchú (0-1 each).

18 November 2015 Round 3	Our Lady's Secondary School	2-14 - 2-08	St Francis College	Boherlahan Grounds
		Report

25 November 2015 Round 3	Gaelcholáiste Mhuire AG	2-13 - 2-07	Pobalscoil na Tríonóide	Páirc Mac Gearailt
	C O’hAinifin 0-5(0-3f) B O’Murchu 1-2, S Busteed 1-0, D Braham 0-2 (0-1f) E O’Siochan 0-2, D Gunning 0-1f. C O’hEalaithe 0-1.	Report	D O’Connell 0-6 (0-4f) D Dalton 1-1 (0-1f) J Ó Ruairc 1-0.

2 December 2015 Round 4	St Francis College	0-23 - 2-12	Charleville CBS	Mourneabbey Grounds
	B Turnbull (0-10, eight frees), J O’Sullivan (0-5), C Cormack (0-3, one free, one 65m), S Kingston and R Crowley (0-2 each), D O’Flaherty (0-1).	Report	J Barry (1-4, one free), L Barrett (1-0), P O’Loughlin (frees) and T Cronnolly (two frees) (0-3 each), T Hanley and S Griffin (0-1 each).

2 December 2015 Round 4	Our Lady's Secondary School	4-31 - 1-09	Pobalscoil na Tríonóide	Leahy Park
	J Kelly 1-6.	Report

10 December 2015 Round 5	Charleville CBS	0-10 - 0-12	Pobalscoil na Tríonóide	Mallow GAA Complex

14 December 2015 Round 5	Our Lady's Secondary School	3-24 - 1-09	Gaelcholáiste Mhuire AG	Ballyagran Grounds
		Report

== Group C ==
=== Group C table ===
Knockout stage

Team	Matches				Score			Pts
Team	Pld	W	D	L	For	Against	Diff	Pts
Nenagh CBS	3	2	0	1	69	48	21	4
St Colman's College	3	2	0	1	68	52	16	4
Thurles CBS	3	2	0	1	63	59	4	4
Scoil Na Tríonóide Naofa	3	0	0	3	38	79	-41	0

=== Group C results ===
14 October 2015 Round 1	Thurles CBS	1-22 - 2-16	St Colman's College	Clonmel GAA Ground
	D Quirke 0-9, C Stakelum 1-1, M Connors 0-3, R Purcell 0-2, M Ryan 0-2, E Barry 0-2, J Butler 0-1, B Kelly 0-1, D Woods 0-1.	Report	S Condon 0-9, J O'Leary 1-2, K Cronin 1-1, C Donnellan 0-2, K O'Leary 0-2.

14 October 2015 Round 1	Nenagh CBS	3-20 - 1-11	Scoil Na Tríonóide Naofa	Lacken Park
		Report

18 November 2015 Round 2	St Colman's College	2-14 - 0-10	Nenagh CBS	Canon Hayes Park
	S Condon (1-8, 0-6 frees); D Linehan (1-0); N O’Leary (0-1 free), C Donnellan, K O’Leary (0-2 each).	Report	R Mulrooney (0-1 free), A O’Flaherty (0-3 each); C Morgan (0-2, 0-1 free); R Maher, R Quirke (0-1 each).

18 November 2015 Round 2	Thurles CBS	2-18 - 0-07	Scoil Na Tríonóide Naofa	St Michael's Park
	D Woods 1-11.	Report

2 December 2015 Round 3	St Colman's College	2-20 - 2-11	Scoil Na Tríonóide Naofa	Gaelic Grounds
	S Condon 0-7 (four frees), K Cronin 2-0, K O’Leary 0-6, C Donnellan 0-3, N O’Leary 0-2 (frees), D Lenihan, S McCarthy 0-1 each.	Report	D O’Connor 1-4 (two frees), M Coleman 1-3 (1-0 penalty, one free), K McMahon, M Feehan, J Ryan, C Berkery 0-1 each.

2 December 2015 Round 3	Nenagh CBS	4-18 - 0-14	Thurles CBS	Páirc Shíleáin
	J Morris 1-4; M Daniels 0-6 (2f, 2 65s); D O’Meara 2-0; R Quirke 0-3; R Byrne 1-0; R Mulrooney, B McLoughney 0-2 each; A Loughnane 0-1.	Report	D Woods 0-6 (5f); M Ryan 0-4; M Connors, D Quirke (1 free) 0-2 each.

== Group D ==
=== Group D table ===
Knockout stage

Team	Matches				Score			Pts
Team	Pld	W	D	L	For	Against	Diff	Pts
Christian Brothers College	3	2	0	0	48	28	20	6
Castletroy College	3	2	0	1	42	39	3	4
CBS High School Clonmel	3	0	1	2	41	52	-11	0
St Flannan's College	3	0	1	2	46	58	-12	1

=== Group D results ===
13 October 2015 Round 1	Castletroy College	1-18 - 1-08	St Flannan's College	O'Garney Park
	A Kennedy 0-8 (3frees, 1 ‘65), C Carroll 1-3, M O’Dwyer 0-4 (2frees), B Garry, F Hourigan and A Nicholas 0-1 each.	Report	A Cassidey 1-1, S Kennedy (2frees), J Murphy (1free) 0-2 each, R Hayes (free), A Kennedy, D Mescall 0-1 each.

14 October 2015 Round 1	Christian Brothers College, Cork	0-16 - 0-08	CBS High School Clonmel	Clashmore Grounds
	J Corkery 0-9 (seven frees, one 65), B Keohane 0-3, R O’Flynn 0-2, S Finn, P Blake 0-1 each.	Report	M Kehoe, D Ryan (two frees) 0-2 each, Matt Barlow, C O’Sullivan, S O’Meara, M Gibbs 0-1 each.

18 November 2015 Round 2	Castletroy College	0-12 - 0-09	CBS High School Clonmel	Golden Grounds
	A Kennedy 0-8.	Report

18 November 2015 Round 2	Christian Brothers College, Cork	2-07 - 0-11	St Flannan's College	FiitzGerald Park
	R O’Flynn 2-1, J Corkery 0-4 (three frees, one 65), R Downey, B Kehoe 0-1 each.	Report	R Hayes 0-5 (frees), S Kennedy 0-3 (frees), C Donnelly, J Cmurphy, A Kennedy 0-1 each.

2 December 2015 Round 3	Christian Brothers College, Cork	1-16 - 0-09	Castletroy College	Ballyagran Grounds
		Report

2 December 2015 Round 3	St Flannan's College	4-12 - 3-15	CBS High School Clonmel	Doon Grounds
		Report

== Knockout stage ==
=== Quarter-finals ===
13 January 2016 Quarter-final	Ardscoi Rís	2-11 - 1-07	St Francis College	Dr Mannix Sportsfield
	P O’Brien (0-5, 0-4 frees); P O’Loughlin (0-4, 0-2 frees); J Flynn, D Fitzgerald (1-0 each); P Casey, C Boylan (0-1 each).	Report	E O’Brien (1-1); B Turnbull (0-2, 0-1 free); J O’Sullivan, C Cormack, S Kingston, J Holland (0-1 each).

13 January 2016 Quarter-final	St Colman's College	2-12 - 0-11	Christian Brothers College, Cork	Mallow GAA Complex
	S Condon (1-6, 0-3 frees, 0-1 65m), K Cronin (1-1), B Murphy, C Donnellan, D Linehan, S O’Connor and O Hickey (0-1 each).	Report	J Corkery (0-6, five frees), B Hennessy, R Downey, E Monahan, S Dolan and R O’Flynn (0-1 each).

13 January 2016 Quarter-final	Our Lady's Secondary School	1-17 - 3-05	Castletroy College	St Michael's Park
	L Fairbrother (1-6), J Bergin (0-4); G Kelly (0-2), A O Meara (0-1), A Ryan (0-1), P Cadell (0-1), B McGrath (0-1), P Bergin (0-1).	Report	M O Dwyer (3-4), A Kennedy (0-1).

13 January 2016 Quarter-final	De La Salle College Waterford	0-13 - 0-10	Nenagh CBS	FitzGerald Park
	H Ruddle 0-5 (frees), E Daly, T Douglas 0-2 each, P Hennebry, M Costigan, M Mahony, C McCann 0-1 each.	Report	M Daniels 0-6 (four frees, one 65), J Morris 0-2, K Nealon, B McLoughney 0-1 each.

=== Semi-finals ===
30 January 2016 Semi-final	Ardscoi Rís	0-13 - 1-09	St Colman's College	FitzGerald Park
	P O’Brien (0-7 frees)(0-8); D Carroll (0-1 sideline)(0-2); J Flynn, P O’Loughlin, C Boylan (0-1 each).	Report	S Condon (0-5 frees, 0-1 65) 0-7; K Cronin (1-0); N O’Leary, J Sheehan (0-1 each).

30 January 2016 Semi-final	Our Lady's Secondary School	2-15 - 2-13 (aet)	De La Salle College Waterford	Canon Hayes Park
	A Ryan 1-2, J Kelly 1-1, S Nolan & P Bergin 0-3 each, B McGrath (2f) & L Fairbrother 0-2 each, D O'Shea & J Bergin (sl) 0-1 each.	Report	H Ruddle 0-7 (6f, 1 sl), T Douglas 2-1, M Costigan 0-2 (1f), P Hennebry, M Mahony & C Quinn 0-1 each.

=== Final ===
20 February 2016 Final	Ardscoi Rís	0-11 - 0-08	Our Lady's Secondary School	MacDonagh Park
	P O’Brien 0-4 (three frees), B Ryan, P Casey, D Fitzgerald 0-2 each, D Carroll 0-1.		B McGrath, J Bergin 0-3 (frees) each, L Fairbrother, K Hassett 0-1 each.	Referee: N Wall (Cork)

== Statistics ==
=== Miscellaneous ===
- Christian Brothers College, Cork had their first Dr Harty Cup victory in 97 years when they defeated CBS High School Clonmel in a Group D first-round match.
