= 1996–97 Harty Cup =

Hurling tournament

1996–97 Dr Harty Cup
- Dates: 16 October 1996 – 16 March 1997
- Teams: 16
- Champions: St Colman's College (6th title); Luke Mannix (captain); Denis Ring (manager)
- Runners-up: Nenagh CBS; Cormac Galvin (captain); Martin Slattery (manager)

Tournament statistics
- Matches played: 15
- Goals scored: 43 (2.87 per match)
- Points scored: 293 (19.53 per match)
- Top scorer(s): Neil Ronan (3-38)

The 1996–97 Harty Cup was the 77th staging of the Harty Cup since its establishment by the Munster Council of Gaelic Athletic Association in 1918. The competition ran from 16 October 1996 to 16 March 1997.

St Colman's College successfully defended its title. in the Harty Cup final on 16 March 1997 at Clonmel GAA Ground, against Nenagh CBS, 1–17 to 0–08, in what was their second consecutive meeting in a final for their sixth successive Harty Cup title overall and a consecutive title since the previous season.

St Colman's College's Neil Ronan was the top scorer with 3-38.

== Results ==
=== First round ===
16 October 1996 First round	St Flannan's College	0-07 - 0-06	Midleton CBS	Fr Con Buckley Park
	S Fitzpatrick 0-2, G Considine 0-1, B Clancy 0-1, C Mullin 0-1, B McMullin 0-1, J O'Meara 0-1.		L Walsh 0-4, B Hegarty 0-1, A Brett 0-1.

16 October 1996 First round	Presentation De La Salle, Hospital	1-06 - 2-26	St Colman's College	Ballygiblin Grounds
	G O'Shea 1-0, D O'Brien 0-2, R O'Donovan 0-2, W O'Brien 0-1, C Hickey 0-1.		N Ronan 1-10, D McInerney 1-2, E Fitzgerald 0-5, J O'Driscoll 0-2, S Kearney 0-2, L Mannix 0-1, P Cotter 0-1, P Mullins 0-1, A Carey 0-1, S Murphy 0-1.

16 October 1996 First round	Thurles CBS	0-14 - 2-06	Charleville CBS	Fr Hayes Memorial Park
	G Coppinger 0-5, M Hassett 0-4, S Butler 0-3, J Ryan 0-1.		J Quinlan 1-2, W Hogan 1-0, B Foley 0-3, P Goold 0-1.

16 October 1996 First round	St Finbarr's College	2-04 - 0-14	Scarriff Community School	Dr Mannix Sportsfield
	J Milner 1-0, A Noonan 1-0, D O'Donovan 0-2, F O'Brien 0-1, T Kenny 0-1.		P Moroney 0-8, F McNamara 0-3, K Kelly 0-2, W Ryan 0-1.

16 October 1996 First round	De La Salle College Waterford	2-08 - 2-17	Doon CBS	Clonmel GAA Ground
	N Dunphy 1-5, N O'Regan 1-1, B Phelan 0-2.		M Kirby 0-10, D Ryan 1-1, J Ryan 1-1, D Stapleton 0-2, P Kirby 0-1, D O'Dwyer 0-1, JJ Mulcahy 0-1.

16 October 1996 First round	Ardscoil Rís	2-06 - 2-07	Nenagh CBS	Cappamore Grounds
	D Sheehan 1-5, F Landy 1-0, B Mescall 0-1.		B Duff 1-3, T Kelly 1-1, R Flannery 0-1, C Martin 0-1, E Gleeson 0-1.

16 October 1996 First round	North Monastery	2-07 - 3-13	Coláiste Chríost Rí	Páirc Uí Rinn
	R Healy 1-4, T Ó hAilpín 1-0, T O'Halloran 0-1, S Glasgow 0-1, N Harte 0-1.		F Murray 2-2, C McCarthy 0-8, N O'Reilly 1-0, G Regan 0-1, B Murphy 0-1.

16 October 1996 First round	Lismore CBS	1-09 - 3-08	Limerick CBS	Mitchelstown Grounds
	S McCarthy 1-0, E Bennett 0-3, T Veale 0-3, G Keane 0-2, P Tobin 0-1.		J Holmes 1-2, M Gavin 1-0, A McCarthy 1-0, C Godfrey 0-2, B Hartigan 0-2, S O'Connor 0-1, S Mullane 0-1.

=== Quarter-finals ===
13 November 1996 Quarter-final	St Colman's College	1-12 - 1-05	St Flannan's College	Ballyagran Grounds
	N Ronan 0-8, E Fitzgerald 1-2, P Cotter 0-1, S Murphy 0-1.		M Greaney 1-0, B McMahon 0-2, G Considine 0-1, C Mullen 0-1, M Shannon 0-1.

13 November 1996 Quarter-final	Nenagh CBS	3-14 - 1-01	Doon CBS	Seán Treacy's Grounds
	T Kelly 2-3, F McDonnell 1-0, P Ryan 0-3, B Duff 0-3, E Troy 0-2, C Galvin 0-1, C Martin 0-1, R Flannery 0-1.		E Ryan 1-0, M Kirby 0-1.

13 November 1996 Quarter-final	Coláiste Chríost Rí	5-15 - 0-05	Limerick CBS	Fr Con Buckley Park
	C McCarthy 3-7, A Cronin 1-0, J Nagle 1-0, T Finn 0-3, R O'Dwyer 0-2, A Fitzpatrick 0-2, B Murphy 0-1.		J McElligott 0-2, J Holmes 0-2, S Mullane 0-1.

13 November 1996 Quarter-final	Thurles CBS	3-09 - 1-10	Scarriff Community School	MacDonagh Park
	M Dwyer 2-0, G Coppinger 0-6, S Butler 1-0, P Donoghue 0-2, G O'Grady 0-1.		P Moloney 0-7, F McNamara 1-0, E Minogue 0-1, D McNamara 0-1, P Kelly 0-1.

=== Semi-finals ===
16 February 1997 Semi-final	Nenagh CBS	1-06 - 0-08	Coláiste Chríost Rí	Fr Con Buckley Park
	B Duff 0-4, T Kelly 1-0, F McDonnell 0-1, C Shouldice 0-1.		C McCarthy 0-6, EP O'Callaghan 0-1, T Finn 0-1.

23 February 1997 Semi-final	St Colman's College	2-18 - 0-07	Thurles CBS	Clonmel GAA Ground
	N Ronan 1-10, L Gardiner 1-1, L Mannix 0-3, J O'Driscoll 0-2, E Fitzgerald 0-1, S Murphy 0-1.		G Coppinger 0-5, G O'Grady 0-1, M Hassett 0-1.

=== Final ===
16 March 1996 Final	St Colman's College	1-17 - 0-08	Nenagh CBS	Clonmel GAA Ground
	N Ronan 1-10, L Mannix 0-3, E Fitzgerald 0-2, S Kearney 0-1, D McInerney 0-1.		B Duff 0-7, T Kelly 0-1.	Referee: J Sexton

== Statistics ==
=== Top scorers ===
Rank	Player	County	Tally	Total	Matches	Average
1	Neil Ronan	St Colman's College	3-38	47	4	11.75
2	Cathal McCarthy	Coláiste Chríost Rí	3-21	30	3	10.00
3	Brian Duff	Nenagh CBS	1-17	20	4	5.00
4	T Kelly	Nenagh CBS	4-05	17	4	4.25
5	Gerry Coppinger	Thurles CBS	0-16	16	3	5.33
6	Patrick Moroney	Scarriff CS	0-15	15	2	7.50
7	Eoin Fitzgerald	St Colman's College	1-10	13	4	3.25
8	Maurice Kirby	Doon CBS	0-11	11	2	5.50
9	Fionán Murray	Coláiste Chríost Rí	2-02	8	3	2.66
10	Donncha Sheehan	Ardscoil Rís	1-05	8	1	8.00
