= 2012–13 Harty Cup =

2012–13 Dr Harty Cup
- Dates: 19 September 2011 – 24 February 2013
- Teams: 21
- Champions: Dungarvan Colleges (2nd title); Tom Devine (captain)
- Runners-up: Our Lady's Secondary School; Jason Ryan (captain)

The 2012–13 Harty Cup was the 93rd staging of the Harty Cup since its establishment by the Munster Colleges Council of the Gaelic Athletic Association in 1918. The competition ran from 19 September 2011 to 24 February 2013.

Coláistí na nDéise, subsequently renamed Dungarvan Colleges, were the defending champions.

The final was played on 24 February 2013 at Seán Treacy Park in Tipperary, between Dungarvan Colleges and Our Lady's Secondary School, in what was their first ever meeting in the final. Dungarvan Colleges won the match by 2–21 to 1–11 to claim their second consecutive Harty Cup title.

== Knockout stage ==
=== Quarter-finals ===
16 January 2013 Quarter-final	Dungarvan Colleges	0-14 - 0-10	Blackwater Community School	Fraher Field
	P Curran 0-8 (5f), D Lyons 0-3, C Curran, C Dunford, T Bourke ('65') 0-1 each;	Report	D Geary 0-7 (5f, 2 '65'), K Bennett 0-2, C Leamy 0-1.

16 January 2013 Quarter-final	Our Lady's Secondary School	2-05 - 0-10	Midleton CBS	Cahir Grounds
	T Nolan 1-1, J McGrath 1-1 f, B Kennedy 0-3.	Report	J Millerick 0-8 (0-7f, 0-1 65), B Dunne, N Motherway 0-1 each.

16 January 2013 Quarter-final	Ardscoil Rís	0-14 - 1-06	Doon CBS
	C Crehan, C O’Brien (three frees) 0-4 each, D Dempsey, E Keogh 0-2 each, M O’Loughlin, R Lynch (free) 0-1 each.	Report	B Murphy 0-3 (all frees), P Cummins 1-0, D O’Donovan 0-2 (two frees), D Coleman 0-1.

17 January 2013 Quarter-final	Thurles CBS	2-23 - 2-12	Castletroy College	Seán Treacy Park
	C Lanigan 0-9 (5f), K Dunne 1-2, S Cahill 0-4, E Moriarty 1-1, S Ryan, S Nally 0-2 each, R Maher (f), P Russell, C Maher 0-1 each.	Report	S Power 0-9 (6f, 1 ’65’), T Morrissey 2-2, B Nash 0-1.

=== Semi-finals ===
2 February 2013 Semi-final	Dungarvan Colleges	1-12 - 0-12	Thurles CBS	Páirc Mhic Gearailt
	P Curran 0-9 (8f), C Breathnach 1-1, T Bourke, C Dunford 0-1 each.	Report	C Lanigan 0-7 (4f, 1 '65'), E Moriarty 0-3, S Nally, K Dunne 0-1 each.

3 February 2023 Semi-final	Our Lady's Secondary School	0-14 - 1-11	Ardscoil Rís	MacDonagh Park
	J McGrath (0-7, 0-5 frees), C O'Riordan (0-5), D Carey, B Kennedy (0-1) each.	Report	C O'Brien (0-6, all frees), C Crehan (1-1), R Lynch (0-3, 0-1 free, 0-1 sideline cut), M O'Loughlin (0-1).

9 February 2023 Semi-final replay	Our Lady's Secondary School	1-13 - 0-14	Ardscoil Rís	MacDonagh Park
	J McGrath 1-7 (0-6f), T Nolan 0-3, JJ Ryan 0-2, B Kennedy 0-1.	Report	R Lynch 0-7 (5f, 1 ’65’), W O’Donoghue, C O’Brien (2f) 0-2 each, C Crehan, C Lynch , M O’Loughlin 0-1 each.

=== Final ===
24 February 2013 Final	Dungarvan Colleges	2-21 - 1-11	Our Lady's Secondary School	Seán Treacy Park
	P Curran 0-8 (5f), R Donnelly 2-1, C Dunford, C Breathnach, T Bourke (3f) 0-3 each, C Curran, M Harney, D Lyons 0-1 each.	Report	J McGrath 0-5 (4f), JJ Ryan 1-0, D Carey 0-2, D McEnroe, T Nolan, Jamie Bergin, C O'Riordan 0-1 each.
