= 2017–18 Harty Cup =

Hurling tournament

2017–18 Dr Harty Cup
- Dates: 11 October 2017 – 17 February 2018
- Teams: 16
- Champions: Ardscoil Rís (5th title); Ronan Connolly (captain); Liam Cronin (manager)
- Runners-up: Midleton CBS; Seán O'Leary-Hayes (captain); Aylwin Kearney (manager); Tim Collins (manager)

Tournament statistics
- Matches played: 31
- Goals scored: 85 (2.74 per match)
- Points scored: 874 (28.19 per match)
- Top scorer(s): Gearóid O'Connor (2-52)

The 2017–18 Dr Harty Cup was the 98th staging of the Harty Cup since its establishment in hurlingby the Munster Council of Gaelic Athletic Association in 1918. The group stage placings were released in July 2017. The competition ran from 11 October 2017 to 17 February 2018.

Our Lady's Secondary School unsuccessfully defended its title in the semi-finals against Midleton CBS.

Ardscoil Rís won the Harty Cup final on 17 February 2018 at Mallow GAA Complex, against Midleton CBS, 3–18 to 2–10, in what was mutually their first ever meeting in a final and the sixth successive Harty Cup title for Ardscoil Rís overall and last title since 2016.

Our Lady's Secondary School's Gearóid O'Connor was the top scorer with 2-52.

== Group A ==
=== Group A table ===
Knockout stage

Team	Matches				Score			Pts
Team	Pld	W	D	L	For	Against	Diff	Pts
Ardscoil Rís	3	3	0	0	74	38	36	6
Midleton CBS	3	2	0	1	79	51	28	4
De La Salle College	3	1	0	2	34	57	-23	2
Charleville CBS	3	0	0	3	39	80	-41	0

=== Group A results ===
11 October 2017 Round 1	Midleton CBS	1-21 - 0-12	De La Salle College Waterford	Bushy Park
	L O'Shea 1-5, L Gosnell 0-6, K Oke 0-2, A Nganou 0-2, J Stack 0-1, G Carroll 0-1, D Moran 0-1, A Walsh-Barry 0-1, C Hickey 0-1, R O'Regan 0-1.	Report	C Power 0-8, A Kirwin 0-1, B Delahunty 0-1, J Troy 0-1, L O'Flynn 0-1.

11 October 2017 Round 1	Ardscoil Rís	3-23 - 0-09	Charleville CBS	FitzGerald Park
	R Considine 2-5, P O'Brien 0-8, C O'Neill 1-2, C O'Reilly 0-3, D Ryan 0-3, C Bourke 0-1, D Woulfe 0-1.	Report	C O'Brien 0-5, F Herr 0-2, C Griffin 0-1, C Buckley 0-1.

25 October 2017 Round 2	Midleton CBS	5-19 - 2-11	Charleville CBS	Mallow GAA Complex
	L O'Shea 1-9, L Gosnell 1-3, J Stack 1-2, G Carroll 1-2, R O'Regan 1-1, A Nganou 0-2.		C O'Brien 1-6, C Griffin 1-0, J Copps 0-1, L Morrissey 0-1, J Twomey 0-1, C Barrington 0-1, D O'Riordan 0-1.

25 October 2017 Round 2	Ardscoil Rís	0-20 - 0-08	De La Salle College Waterford	Boherlahen Grounds
	P O'Brien 0-8, D Ryan 0-4, D Woulfe 0-3, S Long 0-1, C Bourke 0-1, C O'Reilly 0-1.	Report

Round 3	De La Salle College Waterford	0-14 - 1-10	Charleville CBS

15 November 2017 Round 3	Ardscoil Rís	2-16 - 1-18	Midleton CBS	Boherlahen Grounds
	D Ryan (0-6), D Woulfe (1-2); P O’Brien (0-5, 0-4 frees), C O’Neill (1-1), R Duff (0-1); A Moriarty (0-1).	Report	L O’Shea (0-8, 0-4 frees, 0-2 sideline cuts), J Stack (1-2), A Walsh Barry (0-2); L Gosnell (0-2), G Millerick (0-1), R O’Regan (0-1); A Nganou (0-1), C Hickey (0-1).

== Group B ==
=== Group B table ===
Knockout stage

Team	Matches				Score			Pts
Team	Pld	W	D	L	For	Against	Diff	Pts
Our Lady's SS	3	3	0	0	89	46	43	6
Christian Brothers College	3	2	0	1	66	41	25	4
St Flannan's College	3	1	0	2	47	59	-12	2
Castletroy College	3	0	0	3	32	88	-56	0

=== Group B results ===
11 October 2017 Round 1	Our Lady's Secondary School	1-15 - 2-11	Christian Brothers College, Cork	Clonmel GAA Ground
	G O’Connor (0-9, 0-5 frees), J Devaney (1-0), A Ormond (0-3), S Doyle (0-2), F Purcell (0-1).	Report	D McBarron (1-1), E McCarthy (1-1), T O’Connell (0-3 frees), K Finn (0-2); S Barrett (0-1), R Downey (0-1), C Murphy (0-1); D Hanlon (0-1).

11 October 2017 Round 1	St Flannan's College	2-11 - 0-10	Castletroy College	O'Garney Park
		Report

25 October 2017 Round 2	Christian Brothers College, Cork	2-17 - 1-11	St Flannan's College	FitzGerald Park
	I Daly 1-4, T O'Connell 0-6, D McBarron 1-1, D Mahony 0-2, E McCarthy 0-1, R Downey 0-1, P Power 0-1, S Barrett 0-1.		T O'Rourke 0-7, C Haugh 0-2, K McDermott 0-1, G Cahill 0-1.

25 October 2017 Round 2	Our Lady's Secondary School	6-27 - 1-10	Castletroy College	MacDonagh Park
	G O'Connor (1-11, 0-7 frees), J Devaney (2-4), C McGrath (2-3), T O'Farrell (1-0), K Maher (0-3), J Ryan (0-3), S Doyle (0-1), É McBride (0-1), S Ryan (0-1).	Report	R Reale (0-8, 0-5 frees, 0-1 '65), N O'Brien (1-1), B Garry (0-1).

15 November 2017 Round 3	Our Lady's Secondary School	2-20 - 1-13	St Flannan's College	MacDonagh Park
	G O'Connor (1-15, 0-9 frees, 0-1 ‘65), K Maher (1-1), J Devaney (0-2), S Ryan (0-1), M O'Connell (0-1),	Report	T O’Rourke (0-8, 0-5 frees), G Cahill (1-1, 0-1 frees), C Haugh (0-2), K McDermott (0-1), A Brohan (0-1).

17 November 2017 Round 3	Christian Brothers College, Cork	2-20 - 0-09	Castletroy College	Dr Mannix Sportsfield

== Group C ==
=== Group C table ===
Knockout stage

Team	Matches				Score			Pts
Team	Pld	W	D	L	For	Against	Diff	Pts
St Colman's College	3	3	0	0	63	31	32	6
John the Baptist CS	3	2	0	1	47	51	-4	4
Blackwater CS	3	1	0	2	38	49	-11	2
Coláiste Iosaef	3	0	0	3	36	63	-27	0

=== Group C results ===
11 October 2017 Round 1	John the Baptist Community School	1-16 - 0-09	Coláiste Íosaef	Bruff Grounds
	D O'Shea 0-10, O O'Grady 1-1, B O'Grady 0-3, P Wixted 0-1.	Report	S O'Leary 0-6, T McSweeney 0-2, C Hanley-Clarke 0-1.

11 October 2017 Round 1	St Colman's College	0-14 - 0-11	Blackwater Community School	Ballyduff Grounds
	D Lardner 0-6, C Ryan 0-3, D Dennehy 0-2, E Carey 0-1, B Roche 0-1, S Roche 0-1.	Report	I Beecher 0-7, M Noonan 0-1, B O'Brien 0-1, K Bennett 0-1, O O'Gorman 0-1.

25 October 2017 Round 2	Coláiste Íosaef	1-07 - 3-15	St Colman's College	Michael Fox Park
	S O’Leary 1-3 (0-3f), C Hanley-Clarke 0-2, D O’Brien 0-1, G McCarthy 0-1.	Report	D Lardner 0-7 (0-6f), E Davis 1-1 (1-0 pen. 0-1f), P O’Leary 1-1, C Ryan 1-0, E Carey 0-2 (0-1f), D Morrisson 0-2, B Roche 0-1, S O’Keeffe 0-1.

25 October 2017 Round 2	John the Baptist Community School	3-09 - 1-14	Blackwater Community School	Glenroe Grounds
		Report

15 November 2017 Round 3	St Colman's College	3-16 - 0-10	John the Baptist Community School	Michael Fox Park
	D Lardner 0-7 (0-3 frees, 0-2 ‘65s), B Roche 1-4, C Ryan, P O’Leary 1-0 each, G Lardner, N Collins, E Carey, D Dennehy (0-1) each.	Report	D O’Shea 0-5 (0-3 frees, 0-1 ‘65), J O’Donnell 0-2 (both frees), B O’Grady, P Wixted, R Tobin 0-1 each.

20 November 2017 Round 3	Blackwater Community School	1-17 - 1-14	Coláiste Íosaef	Kildorrery Grounds

== Group D ==
=== Group D table ===
Knockout stage

Team	Matches				Score			Pts
Team	Pld	W	D	L	For	Against	Diff	Pts
Thurles CBS	3	2	0	1	65	42	23	4
Gaelcholáiste Mhuire AG	3	2	0	1	55	43	12	4
Nenagh CBS	3	2	0	1	62	58	4	4
Scoil na Tríonóide Naofa	3	0	0	3	41	80	-39	0

=== Group D results ===
11 October 2017 Round 1	Nenagh CBS	2-21 - 3-13	Scoil na Tríonóide Naofa	Lacken Park
		Report

11 October 2017 Round 1	Gaelcholáiste Mhuire AG	0-16 - 1-12	Thurles CBS	Páirc Mac Gearailt
	Blake O’Murchu 0-7 (0-3f) Daire O’Conaire 0-4 (0-3f) Shane O’Riagain 0-4, Eoghan O’Gealbhain 0-1.	Report	Devon Ryan 0-5f. Gearoid Troy 1-1, Aaron Ryan 0-3, Bryan O’Mara 0-2, James Ryan 0-1.

25 October 2017 Round 2	Nenagh CBS	1-15 - 3-08	Gaelcholáiste Mhuire AG	Ballymacarbry Grounds
	K McCarthy 0-8, B McLoughney 1-3, K O'Kelly 0-2, S Kirwan 0-1, M O'Neill 0-1.	Report

25 October 2017 Round 2	Thurles CBS	4-19 - 0-09	Scoil na Tríonóide Naofa	St Patrick's Grounds
	D Ryan (1-9, 0-8 frees, 1-0 penalty), G Troy (1-2), J Lanigan (1-1), D Flood (1-0), M Hackett (0-3), C Connolly (0-2), M Nally (0-1), A Ryan (0-1).	Report	R Renehan (0-3, 0-3 frees), C Ryan (0-2 frees); J Ryan (0-2), W Barry (0-1), F Brady (0-1).

6 December 2017 Round 3	Thurles CBS	2-13 - 2-11	Nenagh CBS	Páirc Shíleáin
	M Hackett (1-1), G Troy (1-1), A Ryan (0-4), D Ryan (0-4, 0-4 frees), C Bowe (0-1), K Ryan (0-1), D Flood (0-1).	Report	C McCarthy (1-6, 0-6 frees), B McLoughney (1-2), E Power (0-1), C Bourke (0-1), B Cooney (0-1).

6 December 2017 Round 3	Gaelcholáiste Mhuire AG	3-13 - 0-10	Scoil na Tríonóide Naofa	Páirc Mac Gearailt
	S O'Regan 2-5, D Connery 0-5, E Murphy 1-1, R Stanton 0-1, D Tynan 0-1.		R Relihan 0-6, B Purcell 0-2, W Barry 0-2.

== Knockout stage ==
=== Quarter-finals ===
10 January 2018 Quarter-final	Ardscoil Rís	3-20 - 1-05	Gaelcholáiste Mhuire AG	Dr Mannix Sportsfield
	P O’Brien 0-9 (4frees 1’65), D Ryan 1-4, C O’Neill 1-2, R Considine 1-1, D Woulfe, R Duff, C O’Reilly and J Daly 0-1 each.	Report	S Ó Riagain 1-1 (0-1free), D Ó Conaire 0-3 (3frees), C Ó Muimhneachain 0-1 (lineball).

10 January 2018 Quarter-final	Midleton CBS	0-15 - 1-11	Thurles CBS	Clonmel GAA Ground
	L Gosnell (0-8, 0-7 frees); L O’Shea (0-2); G Millerick, D Moran, J Stack, C Hickey, K Farmer (0-1 each).	Report	D Ryan (1-4, 0-4 frees); M Hackett (0-2); B O’Mara (0-1 free), K Ryan, C Bowe, D Flood, J Lanigan (0-1 each).

10 January 2018 Quarter-final	Our Lady's Secondary School	1-14 - 0-16	John the Baptist Community School	Dundrum Grounds
	G O'Connor 0-7 (5 frees); A Ormonde 1-3; J Devanney 0-3; S Ryan 0-1.	Report	D O'Shea 0-10 (8 frees), B O'Grady 0-3; R Tobin 0-2; P Heney 0-1.

10 January 2018 Quarter-final	Christian Brothers College, Cork	1-17 - 0-13	St Colman's College	Mallow GAA Complex
	R Downey 0-4, S Barrett, I Daly 0-3 each, D McBarron 1-0, T O’Connell, K Finn 0-2 each, D Hanlon, O McCarthy, P Power 0-1 each.	Report	D Lardner 0-7 (five frees), J Kearney 1-0, P O’Flynn, C Ryan, N Collins, B Roche, E Carey, P O’Leary 0-1 each.

=== Semi-finals ===
27 January 2018 Semi-final	Ardscoil Rís	0-17 - 2-08	Christian Brothers College, Cork	Mallow GAA Complex
	P O’Brien 0-8 (0-5 f), R Considine 0-3, R Connolly, D Woulfe, R Duff, C O’Neill, C Bourke, B O’Connor 0-1 each.	Report	T O’Connell 0-4 f, O McCarthy 0-3, R Downey, I Daly 1-0 each, D Hanlon 0-1

27 January 2018 Semi-final	Midleton CBS	2-27 - 0-16	Our Lady's Secondary School	Clonmel GAA Ground
	L O’Shea 0-13 (0-6 f, 0-1 sl), L Gosnell 0-9 (0-5 f), J Stack 1-2, A Nganou 1-1, K Farmer 0-1, C Hickey 0-1.	Report	G O’Connor 0-10 f, J Devaney 0-3, A Ormonde 0-1, K Maher 0-1, S Doyle 0-1 f.

=== Final ===
17 February 2018 Final	Ardscoil Rís	3-18 - 2-10	Midleton CBS	Mallow GAA Complex
	P O’Brien (0-8, 0-4 frees, 0-2 ‘65s); C O’Neill (1-3); D Ryan (1-2); R Considine (1-1); A Moriarty, D Woulfe, C Bourke, B O’Connor (0-1 each),	Report	L Gosnell (1-7, 0-5 frees); J Stack (1-1); S O’Leary Hayes, C Hickey (0-1 each).	Referee: F Horgan (Tipperary)

== Statistics ==
=== Top scorers ===
Rank	Player	County	Tally	Total	Matches	Average
1	Gearóid O'Connor	Our Lady's SS	2-52	58	6	9.66
2	Paul O'Brien	Ardscoil Rís	0-46	46	6	7.66
3	Liam Gosnell	Midleton CBS	2-35	41	6	8.83
4	Liam O'Shea	Midleton CBS	1-37	40	6	8.66
5	Diarmuid Ryan	Ardscoil Rís	3-23	32	6	5.33
