= 2013–14 Harty Cup =

Hurling tournament

2013–14 Dr Harty Cup
- Dates: 25 September 2013 – 22 February 2014
- Teams: 18
- Champions: Ardscoil Rís (3rd title); Cian Lynch (captain)
- Runners-up: Scoil na Tríonóide Naofa; Stephen Ryan (captain)

The 2013–14 Dr Harty Cup was the 94th staging of the Harty Cup since its establishment in hurling by the Munster Council of Gaelic Athletic Association in 1918. The group stage placings were confirmed on 9 September 2013. The competition ran from 25 September 2013 to 22 February 2014.

Dungarvan Colleges unsuccessfully defended its title.

Ardscoi Rís won the Harty Cup final on 22 February 2014 at the Gaelic Grounds in Limerick, its third successive Harty Cup title overall (last title since 2011), against Scoil na Tríonóide Naofa, 2–13 to 0–04, in their first meeting in the final and all-Limerick final.

== Knockout stage ==
=== Quarter-finals ===
15 January 2014 Quarter-final	Scoil na Tríonóide Naofa	2-13 - 1-15	Charleville CBS	Gaelic Grounds
	C Ryan 1-6 (1-5fs), J Lonergan 0-4, F O’Grady 1-0, D Coleman, M Dee, B Murphy 0-1 each.	Report	D Relihan 0-8fs, J Buckley 1-0, T O’Mahony (1f), J Barry 0-2 each, JP Moloney 0-1.

15 January 2014 Quarter-final	St Francis College	1-13 - 0-11	Thurles CBS	Cahir Grounds
	M Dolan 1-6 (0-5f), S Kingston 0-3, A Ward 0-2, C Cormack & L O’Sullivan 0-1 each.	Report	M Connors & J Woods (3f) 0-3 each, L Moloney 0-2 (1f), M Stakelum, R Heffernan & R Long 0-1 each.

17 January 2014 Quarter-final	Ardscoil Rís	2-19 - 1-08	Our Lady's Secondary School	MacDonagh Park
	R Lynch 0-12 (8f, 1 sl), M O’Loughlin 1-3, C Crehan 1-0, C Lynch 0-3, A Morey 0-1.	Report	T Nolan 1-5 (0-4f), D Carey 0-2, C O’Riordan 0-1.

21 January 2014 Quarter-final	Hamilton High School	0-13 - 0-11	Dungarvan CBS	Mallow GAA Complex
	M Cahalane 0-10 (five frees, two 65s, one sideline), T Horgan 0-2, L Meade 0-1.	Report	P Curran 0-7 (four frees, one 65), C O’Grady 0-2, C Barry, A Donnelly 0-1 each.

=== Semi-finals ===
1 February 2014 Semi-final	Ardscoi Rís	2-14 - 1-04	Hamilton High School	Mallow GAA Complex
	R Lynch 1-9 (1-0, 65, 0-7 frees), C Crehan 1-1, A Morey, M O’Loughlin, C Lynch, I Galvin 0-1 each.	Report	M Cahalane 1-4 (0-2fs).

9 February 2014 Semi-final	Scoil na Tríonóide Naofa	0-15 - 1-09	St Francis College	Dr Mannix Sportsfield
	C Ryan 0-9 (7frees), D Coleman 0-5, D Buckley 0-1	Report	S Kingston 1-0, A Ward and D Griffin 0-2 each, C Kingston, N Cashman (‘65), G Connelly (free), C Cormack, M Dolan 0-1 each.

=== Final ===
22 February 2014 Final	Ardscoi Rís	2-13 - 0-04	Scoil na Tríonóide Naofa	Gaelic Grounds
	R Lynch 0-6 (0-3f), I Galvin 1-2, C Crehan 1-0, A Morey 0-2, C Lynch, M O’Loughlin & T Grimes 0-1 each.	Report	C Ryan 0-3 (0-3f), M Coleman 0-1.
