= Eoin Fitzgerald =

Irish hurler

Personal information
- Native name: Eoin Mac Gearailt (Irish)
- Nickname: Fitz
- Born: 7 January 1980 (age 46) Castlelyons, County Cork, Ireland
- Occupation: Tax Consultant
- Height: 5 ft 10 in (178 cm)

Sport
- Sport: Hurling
- Position: Left wing-forward
Clubs
- Years: Club
- Castlelyons → Imokilly; Castlegar; Oranmore-Maree
Club titles
- Cork titles: 1
College
- Years: College
- University of Limerick
College titles
- Fitzgibbon titles: 1
Inter-county
Years	County	Apps (scores)
2000-2004	Cork	0 (0-00)
Inter-county titles
- Munster titles: 1
- All-Irelands: 0
- NHL: 0
- All Stars: 0

Eoin Fitzgerald (born 7 January 1980) is an Irish former hurler. He played with a number of clubs, including Castlelyons, Castlegar and Oranmore-Maree, divisional side Imokilly and was also a member of the Cork senior hurling team. He usually lined out as a forward.

== Career ==
Fitzgerald played schoolboy hurling with St Colman's College in Fermoy on a team that won consecutive Harty Cup titles and an All-Ireland Colleges Championship title in 1997. He later lined out with the University of Limerick and won a Fitzgibbon Cup title in 2002. At club level, Fitzgerald first lined out with Castlelyons in the juvenile and underage grades and was just 17-years-old when he won a Cork JAHC title with the team in 1997. This was followed by a Cork IHC title and a Cork SHC title with divisional side Imokilly in 1998. Fitzgerald first appeared on the inter-county scene as a member of the Cork minor hurling team that beat Kilkenny in the All-Ireland minor hurling final. He progressed through the under-21 and intermediate teams before winning a Munster Championship title with the senior team in 2000. A broken collarbone ruled him out of the 2003 championship, however, he returned to the panel for the 2004 league.

== Honours ==
St. Colman's College

- Dr Croke Cup: 1997
- Dr Harty Cup: 1997

University of Limerick

- Fitzgibbon Cup: 2002

Castlelyons

- Cork Intermediate Hurling Championship: 1998
- Cork Junior A Hurling Championship: 1997

Imokilly

- Cork Senior Hurling Championship: 1998

Cork

- Munster Senior Hurling Championship: 2000
- Munster Intermediate Hurling Championship: 1999
- All-Ireland Minor Hurling Championship: 1998
- Munster Minor Hurling Championship: 1998
