= Shane Bennett =

Shane Bennett may refer to:

- Shane Bennett (hurler) (born 1996), Irish hurler
- Shane Bennett (baseball), Australia national baseball team
- Shayne Bennett (born 1972), Australian rules footballer
- Shane Bennett (died 2002), see Harris County Sheriff's Office (Texas)
