= Pa Finn =

Cork hurler, selector and manager (1936–2024)

Patrick Finn (1936 – 16 February 2024) was an Irish hurler, selector and manager. He played at club level with St Finbarr's and at inter-county level with the Cork junior hurling team. Finn also served as manager at club and inter-county levels.

== Playing career ==
Finn first played hurling at club level with St Finbarr's. He was part of the St Finbarr's junior team that won the Cork JHC medal on the field of play in 1956. Finn was drafted onto the Cork junior hurling team following this victory, and he was an unused substitute when Cork were beaten by Limerick in the 1957 Munster JHC final. He spent over a decade with the St Finbarr's senior team, and was a non-playing substitute when "the Barr's" beat University College Cork in the 1965 final.

== Coaching career ==
Following his retirement from playing, Finn continued his long-standing association with St Finbarr's as a coach, selector and committee member. He was coach of the club's senior team when they won their second ever All-Ireland Club SHC title in 1978. Finn was also involved as a club administrator when St Finbarr's enjoyed five Cork SHC successes between 1980 and 1988.

Finn was also involved with several other clubs in the lower grades. He coached Kilbrittain to win the Cork JAHC title in 1985. Finn later guided St Catherine's to senior status after winning the Cork IHC title in 1994. His tenure as coach of the Castlelyons club saw Cork JAHC success in 1997, followed by a Cork IHC title in 1998. Finn also spent a period of time with Erin's Own and Tracton.

At inter-county level, Finn joined the Cork senior camogie team management set-up as a selector before taking over as manager. One of his first initiatives as manager was his insistence that, as a Cork team, the colour of the jerseys should be changed from white to red. Finn's three-year tenure in charge saw Cork win two National League titles, Munster SCC honours, as well as the All-Ireland SCC title in 2002. He became a selector with the Cork senior hurling team when Denis Walsh was appointed manager in 2009.

== Personal life and death ==
Born in the Lough area of Cork, Finn was the son of Tim 'Gas' Finn, who won Cork SHC medals with the St Finbarr's club in the 1920s. His uncle, Mick Finn, was on the first Cork team to win the All-Ireland MHC title in 1928. His brother, Mossie Finn, won an All-Ireland SHC title with Cork in 1952. Finn's nephew, Ger Cunningham, won three All-Ireland SHC medals with Cork.

Finn died on 16 February 2024, at the age of 87.

== Honours ==
=== Player ===
St Finbarr's

- Cork Senior Hurling Championship: 1965
- Cork Junior Hurling Championship: 1956

=== Management ===
St Finbarr's

- All-Ireland Senior Club Hurling Championship: 1978
- Munster Senior Club Hurling Championship: 1977
- Cork Senior Hurling Championship: 1977

Kilbrittain

- Cork Junior A Hurling Championship: 1985
- South West Junior A Hurling Championship: 1985

St Catherine's

- Cork Intermediate Hurling Championship: 1994

Castlelyons

- Cork Intermediate Hurling Championship: 1998
- Cork Junior A Hurling Championship: 1997
- East Cork Junior A Hurling Championship: 1997

Cork

- All-Ireland Senior Camogie Championship: 2002
- National Camogie League: 2001, 2003
