= 1998 Cork Intermediate Hurling Championship =

Irish hurling competition

- Dates: 20 June 1998 – 8 November 1998
- Teams: 25
- Sponsor: TSB Bank
- Champions: Castlelyons (1st title); Mick Spillane (captain); Pa Finn (manager)
- Runners-up: Killeagh; Dick Walsh (captain); Niall Crowley (manager)

Tournament statistics
- Matches played: 26
- Goals scored: 80 (3.08 per match)
- Points scored: 601 (23.12 per match)
- Top scorer(s): Joe Deane (3-24)

The 1998 Cork Intermediate Hurling Championship was the 89th staging of the Cork Intermediate Hurling Championship since its establishment by the Cork County Board in 1909. The draw for the opening fixtures took place on 14 December 1997. The championship began on 20 June 1998 and ended on 8 November 1998.

On 8 November 1998, Castlelyons won the championship after a 2-12 to 2-09 defeat of Killeagh in the final at Páirc Uí Chaoimh. It was their first championship title in the grade.

Killeagh's Joe Deane was the championship's top scorer with 3-24.

== Team changes ==
=== From Championship ===
Promoted to the Cork Senior Hurling Championship

- Cloyne

Regraded to the City Junior A Hurling Championship

- Bishopstown

=== To Championship ===
Promoted from the Cork Junior A Hurling Championship

- Castlelyons

== Results ==
=== First round ===
20 June 1998 First round	Inniscarra	1-15 - 2-15	Ballymartle	Ballinora
	S Holland 0-4, J Lynch 1-0, J Olden 0-2, D O'Leary 0-2, T Ahern 0-2, J O'Mahony 0-1, C O'Mahony 0-1, D Holland 0-1, A Maher 0-1, T Murray 0-1.		G Cummins 0-7, P Coughlan 1-2, P Deasy 1-1, C Deasy 0-1, N Sheehan 0-1, M Fitzpatrick 0-1, K Lordan 0-1, B Dwyer 0-1.

21 June 1998 First round	Na Piarsaigh	1-10 - 0-13	Tracton	Carrigaline
	D O'Sullivan 0-6, G Shaw 1-0, D Gardiner 0-1, K Butterworth 0-1, P Flynn 0-1, T Ó hAilpín 0-1.		DJ Kiely 0-3, F Lynch 0-2, L Kelly 0-2, P Murray 0-1, P O'Reilly 0-1, J Kingston 0-1, K Kingston 0-1, M Quinn 0-1, J Quinn 0-1.

26 June 1998 First round	Argideen Rangers	1-11 - 0-07	Blarney	Cloughduv
	M Walsh 0-5, M O'Callaghan 1-0, T Crowley 0-3, J Crowley 0-1, M Foley 0-1, B Harte 0-1.		J Hughes 0-3, JP Kearney 0-1, S O'Donoghue 0-1, B Sheehan 0-1, J Hurley 0-1.

27 June 1998 First round replay	Na Piarsaigh	2-11 - 3-11	Tracton	Carrigaline
	D Gardiner 1-1, C O'Sullivan 1-0, D O'Sullivan 0-3, M McSweeney 0-3,		M Kingston 2-1, F Lynch 1-2, JP Kiely 0-4, F Walsh 0-3, P Murphy 0-1.

27 June 1998 First round	Cobh	4-10 - 5-16	Mallow	Watergrasshill
	M Daly 1-2, V O'Rourke 1-2, P Looney 1-1, B Meaney 1-0, D Barrett 0-1, R Meaney 0-1, B Kearney 0-1, C Crowe 0-1, P Meaney 0-1.		T O'Riordan 2-2, P Dineen 2-1, R O'Connell 0-7, J Hayes 1-0, F McCormack 0-3, R Sheehan 0-2, M Buckley 0-1.

27 June 1998 First round	Newcestown	0-10 - 0-12	Castlelyons	Church Road
	P Condon 0-4, P Crowley 0-3, P Kenneally 0-2, E Kenneally 0-1.		E Fitzgerald 0-7, T McCarthy 0-2, S McAuliffe 0-1, M Spillane 0-1, P O'Brien 0-1.

28 June 1998 First round	Youghal	1-10 - 1-10	Delanys	Páirc Uí Chonaill
	T Coyne 1-2, N Hogan 0-4, C O'Brien 0-1, B Coleman 0-1, E Coleman 0-1, A Murphy 0-1.		J Egan 1-2, K Egan 0-3, G Healy 0-2, B Egan 0-1, D Quinlan 0-1, P Finnegan 0-1.

28 June 1998 First round	St. Vincent's	0-09 - 2-08	Aghabullogue	Blarney
	T O'Sullivan 0-4, B Coutts 0-2, D O'Brien 0-1, J Buckley 0-1, J Canniffe 0-1.		D O'Leary 1-5, D Murphy 1-0, J Healy 0-1, T Tarrant 0-1, Danny Buckley 0-1.

4 July 1998 First round replay	Youghal	1-10 - 0-11	Delanys	Páirc Uí Chonaill
	T Coyne 0-6, M Walsh 1-1, E Coleman 0-2, B O'Connell 0-1.		K Egan 0-4, P O'Connell 0-2, J Egan 0-2, B Egan 0-1, M O'Driscoll 0-1, D McElhinney 0-1.

12 July 1998 First round	Glen Rovers	1-10 - 2-13	Cloughduv	Ballinhassig
	B McGuckin 1-2, C Buckley 0-4, N Harte 0-2, A Goulding 0-2.		K Murray 2-3, J Grainger 0-3, D Slyne 0-2, P Dunlea 0-2, J Riordan 0-1, T O'Mahony 0-1, T Barry-Murphy 0-1.

25 July 1998 First round	Ballincollig	0-15 - 0-09	Douglas	Ballinhassig
	P O'Mahony 0-7, T O'Leary 0-2, O Dineen 0-2, J Dwyer 0-1, J Miskella 0-1, D Murphy 0-1, F Kelly 0-1.		T Twomey 0-6, B McLoughlin 0-2, D Larkin 0-1.

=== Second round ===
20 June 1998 Second round	Milford	1-17 - 4-12	Éire Óg	Mallow
	R Geary 1-5, P Buckley 0-4, D O'Brien 0-3, M Fitzgibbon 0-1, G Fitzgibbon 0-1, N Geary 0-1, P O'Brien 0-1, P Madigan 0-1.		T Cronin 1-3, M Sheehan 1-2, C Óg Sheehan 1-1, J Malone 1-1, P Coakley 0-3, J Murphy 0-1, K Sheehan 0-1.

27 June 1998 Second round	Carrigtwohill	3-09 - 3-07	Valley Rovers	Páirc Uí Rinn
	S Barry 2-0, M Fitzgerald 0-4, S O'Farrell 1-0, N McCarthy 0-3, J O'Connor 0-2.		R o'Donovan 2-2, D Kiely 1-3, C O'Donovan 0-1, J Burke 0-1.

4 July 1998 Second round	Killeagh	1-15 - 0-11	St. Finbarr's	Carrigtwohill
	J Deane 0-7, A Leahy 1-1, D Irwin 0-3, M Landers 0-2, K Scully 0-1, A Budds 0-1.		B O'Shea 0-6, J McCarthy 0-2, J Doolan 0-1, A Maher 0-1, P Forde 0-1.

18 July 1998 Second round	Ballymartle	2-07 - 1-08	Aghabullogue	Ovens
	M Fitzpatrick 1-1, C Deasy 1-1, P Coughlan 0-2, A McCarthy 0-1, C Sheehan 0-1, G Cummins 0-1.		D O'Leary 0-6, T Tarrant 1-0, David Buckley 0-1.

19 July 1998 Second round	Argideen Rangers	1-13 - 2-13	Mallow	Church Road
	M Walsh 1-5, J Crowley 0-3, B Harte 0-2, T Crowley 0-1, M O'Callaghan 0-1, M Foley 0-1.		R O'Connell 1-6, S Buckley 1-0, P Dineen 0-2, J Walsh 0-1, T O'Riordan 0-1, P Buckley 0-1, R Sheehan 0-1, C O'Callaghan 0-1.

9 August 1998 Second round	Youghal	2-12 - 1-13	Ballincollig	Páirc Lios gCúl
	T Coyne 0-6, E Coleman 1-0, C O'Brien 1-0, A Murphy 0-2, M Downing 0-1, P O'Brien 0-1, JP Joyce 0-1, B Hogan 0-1.		P O'Mahony 0-10, D Beale 1-0, M O'Brien 0-1, J O'Dwyer 0-1, E Dineen 0-1.

9 August 1998 Second round	Tracton	0-15 - 1-15	Aghada	Páirc Uí Chonaill
	F Walsh 0-6, TJ Kiely 0-4, F Lynch 0-3, K Kingston 0-1, M Kingston 0-1.		R Lewis 0-11, P Cashman 1-0, C Counihan 0-2, D Devoy 0-1, R Dwane 0-1.

5 September 1998 Second round	Castlelyons	3-12 - 3-11	Cloughduv	Páirc Uí Rinn
	T McCarthy 2-2, E Fitzgerald 0-6, M Spillane 1-1, P Cashman 0-2, D Sheehan 0-1.		K Murray 0-7, T O'Mahony 1-1, J Grainger 1-0, D O'Leary 1-0, S McAuliffe 0-1, T Barry-Murphy 0-1, P Dunlea 0-1.

=== Quarter-finals ===
2 August 1998 Quarter-final	Mallow	4-13 - 2-13	Ballymartle	Páirc Uí Rinn
	F McCormack 1-4, T Dineen 1-4, R Sheehan 1-1, M Browne 1-1, T O'Riordan 0-1, J Hayes 0-1, M Buckley 0-1.		G Cummins 1-9, P Coughlan 1-1, M Allen 0-1.

16 August 1998 Quarter-final	Carrigtwohill	0-11 - 0-10	Éire Óg	Church Road
	M Fitzgerald 0-3, N Gubbins 0-2, N McCarthy 0-2, S Barry 0-1, J Barrett 0-1, J O'Connor 0-1, S O'Farrell 0-1.		T Cronin 0-5, M Sheehan 0-2, J Malone 0-1, P Coakley 0-1, C Sheehan 0-1.

16 August 1998 Quarter-final	Killeagh	3-14 - 1-13	Aghada	Youghal
	J Deane 2-6, J Irwin 1-2, M Landers 0-2, G Scully 0-2, K Scully 0-2.		Peter Cashman 1-2, R Dwane 0-4, R Lewis 0-4, D Devoy 0-1, M Lewis 0-1, C Counihan 0-1.

27 September 1998 Quarter-final	Castlelyons	2-13 - 1-10	Youghal	St. Catherine's Park
	T McCarthy 0-6, S McAuliffe 1-0, P Murphy 1-0, E Fitzgerald 0-2, D Sheehan 0-2, P Cashman 0-1, P Cotter 0-1, M Spillane 0-1.		B Coleman 1-3, T Coyne 0-2, A Murphy 0-2, E Coleman 0-1, M Downing 0-1, B Hogan 0-1.

=== Semi-finals ===
26 September 1998 Semi-final	Killeagh	3-14 - 2-11	Carrigtwohill	Ballymacoda
	J Deane 0-7, K Scully 2-0, G Scully 1-0, M Landers 0-3, A Budds 0-2, J Fitzgerald 0-1, D Irwin 0-1.		J O'Connor 1-3, M Fitzgerald 0-4, S McCarthy 1-0, N McCarthy 0-1, N Gubbins 0-1, S O'Farrell 0-1, S Cuddigan 0-1.

11 October 1998 Semi-final	Castlelyons	2-10 - 1-12	Mallow	Páirc Uí Chaoimh
	E Fitzgerald 1-5, P O'Brien 1-0, T McCarthy 0-3, P Cashman 0-1, D Sheehan 0-1.		R O'Connell 0-8, T O'Riordan 1-1, F McCormack 0-2, F Buckley 0-1.

=== Final ===
8 November 1998 Final	Castlelyons	2-12 - 2-09	Killeagh	Páirc Uí Chaoimh
	E Fitzgerald 0-5, P Murphy 1-1, P O'Brien 1-0, S McAuliffe 0-2, D Sheehan 0-1, M Spillane 0-1, P Cashman 0-1, T McCarthy 0-1.		J Deane 1-4, J Fitzgerald 1-0, M Landers 0-2, D Irwin 0-1, A Leahy 0-1, L Collins 0-1.	Referee: J Motherway (Killeagh)

== Championship statistics ==
=== Top scorers ===
Overall

Rank	Player	Club	Tally	Total	Matches	Average
1	Joe Deane	Killeagh	3-24	33	4	8.25
2	Eoin Fitzgerald	Castlelyons	1-25	28	5	5.60
3	Ray O'Connell	Mallow	1-21	24	3	8.00
4	Timmy McCarthy	Castlelyons	2-14	20	3	5.00
4	Ger Cummins	Ballymartle	1-17	20	3	5.00
6	Tony Coyne	Youghal	1-16	19	4	4.75
7	Podsie O'Mahony	Ballincollig	0-17	17	2	8.50
8	Kevin Murray	Cloughduv	2-10	16	2	8.00
9	Richie Lewis	Aghada	0-15	15	2	7.50
10	Tadhg O'Riordan	Mallow	3-05	14	4	3.50
10	Denis O'Leary	Aghabullogue	1-11	14	2	7.00

In a single game

Rank	Player	Club	Tally	Total	Opposition
1	Joe Deane	Killeagh	2-06	12	Aghada
1	Ger Cummins	Ballymartle	1-09	12	Mallow
3	Richie Lewis	Aghada	0-11	11	Tracton
4	Podsie O'Mahony	Ballincollig	0-10	10	Youghal
5	Kevin Murray	Cloughduv	2-03	9	Glen Rovers
5	Ray O'Connell	Mallow	1-06	9	Argideen Rangers
7	Tadhg O'Riordan	Mallow	2-02	8	Cobh
7	Ray O'Donovan	Valley Rovers	2-02	8	Carrigtwohill
7	Timmy McCarthy	Castlelyons	2-02	8	Cloughduv
7	Denis O'Leary	Aghabullogue	1-05	8	St. Vincent's
7	Ronan Geary	Milford	1-05	8	Éire Óg
7	Michael Walsh	Argideen Rangers	1-05	8	Mallow
7	Eoin Fitzgerald	Castlelyons	1-05	8	Mallow
7	Ray O'Connell	Mallow	0-08	8	Castlelyons
