= Peter Casey (hurler) =

Irish hurler (born 1997)

Personal information
- Native name: Peadar Ó Cathasaigh (Irish)
- Born: 21 July 1997 (age 29) Caherdavin, Limerick, Ireland
- Height: 5 ft 11 in (180 cm)

Sport
- Sport: Hurling
- Position: Right corner-forward
Club
- Years: Club
- Na Piarsaigh
Club titles
- Limerick titles: 5
- Munster titles: 2
- All-Ireland Titles: 1
Inter-county*
Years	County	Apps (scores)
2017–present	Limerick	43 (4–80)
Inter-county titles
- Munster titles: 6
- All-Irelands: 6
- NHL: 4
- All Stars: 1
- *Inter County team apps and scores correct as of 22:29, 19 July 2026.

Peter Casey (born 21 July 1997) is an Irish hurler who plays as a right corner-forward for club side Na Piarsaigh and at inter-county level with the Limerick senior hurling team. His brother, Mike Casey, also plays for both teams.

== Playing career ==
=== College ===
Casey first came to prominence as a hurler with Ardscoil Rís in Limerick. On 20 February 2016, he scored two points when Ardscoil Rís won the Harty Cup title after an 0–11 to 0–08 defeat of Our Lady's Secondary School from Templemore in the final.

=== Club ===
Casey joined the Na Piarsaigh club at a young age and played in all grades at juvenile and underage levels, enjoying championship success in the under-16 and under-21 grades. He later made his senior championship debut for the club.

On 11 October 2015, Casey was at left corner-forward when Na Piarsaigh defeated Patrickswell by 1–22 to 4–12 to win the Limerick Senior Championship. Later that season he won a Munster Championship medal after a 2–18 to 2–11 defeat of Ballygunner in the final. On 17 March 2016, Casey won an All-Ireland medal when Na Piarsaigh defeated Ruairí Óg by 2–25 to 2–14 in the final.

On 15 October 2017, Casey won a second Limerick Championship medal when Na Piarsaigh defeated Kilmallock by 1–22 to 2–14 in the final. He later won a second Munster Championship medal when Na Piarsaigh defeated Ballygunner by 3–15 to 2–10 in the final. On 17 March 2018, Casey was at corner-forward when Na Piarsaigh were defeated by Cuala in the All-Ireland final.

On 27 October 2018, Casey won a third Limerick Championship medal following Na Piarsaigh's 2–22 to 3–10 defeat of Doon.

Casey won his 4th county senior hurling medal in 2020 with a victory over Doon in the LIT Gaelic Grounds and a 5th medal followed in 2022 with a comprehensive victory over Kilmallock

=== Inter-county ===
==== Minor and under-21 ====
Casey first played for Limerick at minor level. On 22 July 2014, he was at left corner-forward when Limerick won their second successive Munster Championship title after a 0–24 to 0–18 defeat of Waterford in the final. Casey was moved to left wing-forward for the subsequent All-Ireland final against Kilkenny on 7 September 2014. He was held scoreless in the 2–17 to 0–19 defeat. Casey's second and final season with the Limerick minor hurling team ended with an All-Ireland quarter-final defeat by Galway.

In his final year on the minor team, Casey was included on the Limerick under-21 team. He won a Munster Championship medal in his debut season after a 0–22 to 0–19 win over Clare in the final. On 12 September 2015, Casey was introduced as a substitute when Limerick defeated Wexford in the All-Ireland final.

After surrendering their title in 2016, Casey won a second Munster Championship medal the following year after a 0–16 to 1–11 defeat of Cork in the final. On 9 September 2017, Casey was at right corner-forward in Limerick's 0–17 to 0–11 defeat of Kilkenny in the All-Ireland final. He was later named on the Bord Gáis Energy Team of the Year for a second time.

==== Senior ====
Casey made his first senior appearance on 22 January 2017, scoring 1–09 in a pre-season Munster League defeat of Kerry. Later that season he made his first appearance in the National Hurling League in a three-point defeat by Wexford.

On 19 August 2018, Casey was introduced as a 63rd-minute substitute for Séamus Flanagan when Limerick won their first All-Ireland title in 45 years after a 3–16 to 2–18 defeat of Galway in the final.

On 31 March 2019, Casey was selected at full-forward for Limerick's National League final meeting with Waterford at Croke Park. He collected a winners' medal after scoring three points from play in the 1–24 to 0–19 victory. On 30 June 2019, Casey won a Munster Championship medal after top scoring with 1–05 from play in Limerick's 2–26 to 2–14 defeat of Tipperary in the final. He ended the game with the man of the match award. Casey ended the year by receiving his first All-Star nomination.

On 28 April 2024, Casey suffered a broken ankle in the Munster Senior Hurling Championship victory over Tipperary which will rule him out for the rest of the year.

== Career statistics ==
As of match played 19 July 2026.

Team	Year	National League			Munster		All-Ireland		Total	
Team	Year	Division	Apps	Score	Apps	Score	Apps	Score	Apps	Score
Limerick	2017	Division 1B	3	0–09	1	0–01	1	0–03	5	0–13
Limerick	2018	Division 1B	0	0–00	0	0–00	4	1–05	4	1–05
Limerick	2019	Division 1A	6	1–14	5	1–11	1	0–00	12	2–26
Limerick	2020	Division 1A	1	0–03	3	0–07	2	0–02	6	0–12
Limerick	2021	Division 1A	5	0–09	2	0–08	2	0–07	9	0–24
	2022		0	0–00	0	0–00	2	0–00	2	0–00
	2023		5	1–09	5	0–04	2	0–07	12	1–20
	2024		3	0–01	1	1–02	0	0–00	4	1–03
	2025		1	0–01	4	0–05	1	0–01	6	0–07
	2026		3	0-09	5	1-11	2	0-06	10	1-26
Career total			27	2–55	26	3–49	17	1–31	70	6–136

== Honours ==
=== Ardscoil Rís ===
- Dr Harty Cup: 2016

=== Na Piarsaigh ===
- All-Ireland Senior Club Hurling Championship: 2016
- Munster Senior Club Hurling Championship: 2015, 2017
- Limerick Senior Hurling Championship: 2015, 2017, 2018, 2020, 2022

=== Limerick ===
- All-Ireland Senior Hurling Championship: 2018, 2020, 2021, 2022, 2023
- Munster Senior Hurling Championship: 2019, 2020, 2021, 2022, 2023
- National Hurling League: 2019, 2020, 2023
- All-Ireland Under-21 Hurling Championship: 2015, 2017
- Munster Under-21 Hurling Championship: 2015, 2017
- Munster Minor Hurling Championship (1): 2014

=== Awards ===
- All-Star Award (1): 2021
- The Sunday Game Team of the Year (1): 2021
- All-Ireland Senior Hurling Championship Final Man of the Match (1): 2023

Awards
Preceded by Gearóid Hegarty	All-Ireland SHC Final; Man of the Match; 2023	Succeeded by Incumbent
