= 2011–12 Harty Cup =

2011–12 Dr Harty Cup
- Dates: October 2011 – 26 February 2012
- Champions: Coláistí na nDéise (1st title); Kieran Power (captain)
- Runners-up: Nenagh CBS; Jason Forde (captain)

The 2011–12 Harty Cup was the 92nd staging of the Harty Cup since its establishment by the Munster Colleges Council of the Gaelic Athletic Association in 1918. The competition ran from October 2011 to 26 February 2012.

Ardscoil Rís were the defending champions.

The final was played on 26 February 2012 at Leahy Park in Cashel, between Coláistí na nDéise and Nenagh CBS, in what was their first ever meeting in the final. Coláistí na nDéise won the match by 2–14 to 1–10 to claim their first ever Harty Cup title.

== Knockout stage ==
=== Quarter-finals ===
18 January 2012 Quarter-final	Ardscoil Rís	2-15 - 1-07	Castletroy College	Bruff Grounds
	J Shanahan 0-8fs, J Kelleher, K O’Brien 1-1 each, C Lynch, R Lynch, M Foley, C O’Brien, M O’Loughlin 0-1 each.	Report	K Enright 0-5 (4fs), E Doyle 1-0 (pen), S Power (f), G Hegarty 0-1 each.

18 January 2012 Quarter-final	De La Salle College Waterford	2-12 - 0-07	Midleton CBS	Cappoquin Grounds
	D O’Flynn 0-12 (0-10f, 0-1 ’65), T Mullally, C Sheehan 1-0 each.	Report	C Walsh 0-4 (0-4f), S Treacy, D Morrissey (0-1f), P White 0-1 each.

18 January 2012 Quarter-final	Coláistí na nDéise	1-13 - 1-12	St Flannan's College	Seán Treacy Park
	C Curran 0-10 (9f, 1 65), M Hurney 1-1, M Kiely 0-1, P Curran 0-1.	Report	T Kelly 0-5 (0-4f), P Duggan 0-3 (2f, 1 sideline), S Ward 1-0, M O’Leary 0-1, C Cleary 0-1 (f), S O’Donnell 0-1, D Reidy 0-1.

18 January 2012 Quarter-final	Nenagh CBS	0-16 - 1-13	Thurles CBS	Dolla Grounds
	K Slattery 1-1, Sean Maher (Clonoulty-Rossmore) 0-3, P Ralph 0-3 (2f), C Lanigan 0-3 (2f), C Hammersley 0-2, S Kennedy 0-1.	Report	J Forde 0-9 (5f, 1 sl), P Fogarty 0-2, J Loughnane, T Gallagher, S O’Brien, P Shanahan & J Mackey, 0-1 each.

25 January 2012 Quarter-final replay	Nenagh CBS	1-07 - 0-08	Thurles CBS	Dolla Grounds
	J Forde 1-5 (1-0p, 3fs), P Shanahan, J Mackey 0-1 each.	Report	C Lanigan 0-5 (4fs), S Kennedy, P Ralph, S Maher (Treacy’s) 0-1 each.

=== Semi-finals ===
4 February 2012 Semi-final	Coláistí na nDéise	2-13 - 1-08	De La Salle College Waterford	Fraher Field
	Cathal Curran (0-6, 2f); M. Kiely (1-1); M Harney (1-0); Cormac Curran (0-3); P Curran (0-2); C Dunford (0-1).	Report	A Gleeson (1-3, frees); J McCarthy (0-3); A Farrell, B O’Sullivan(0-1) each.

5 February 2012 Semi-final	Ardscoil Rís	2-08 - 1-11	Nenagh CBS	Seán Treacy Park
	J Shanahan 1-2 (1-0 pen, 0-2fs), L O’Brien 1-0, J Kelleher 0-2, R Lynch, J Hannon, K O’Brien, M O’Loughlin 0-1 each.	Report	J Forde 0-7 (5fs, 2 65s), S O’Brien 1-1, T Gallagher 0-2, P Fogarty 0-1.

14 February 2012 Semi-final replay	Ardscoil Rís	0-13 - 1-11	Nenagh CBS	Seán Treacy Park
	J Forde 1-10 (0-6f), S O’Brien 0-1.	Report	R Lynch (0-5f), J Shanahan (0-4f) 0-5 each, W O’Donoghue, J Kelleher, C Lynch 0-1 each.

=== Final ===
26 February 2012 Final	Coláistí na nDéise	2-14 - 1-10	Nenagh CBS	Leahy Park
	Cathal Curran 1-9 (1-6fs), P Curran 1-2, Cormac Curran 0-2 (0-1f), C Dunford 0-1.	Report	J Forde 1-4 (0-4f), T Gallagher 0-3, J Loughnane (1 65) 0-2, P Shanahan 0-1.
