= 2010–11 Harty Cup =

2010–11 Dr Harty Cup
- Dates: 6 October 2010 – 27 February 2011
- Teams: 14
- Champions: Ardscoil Rís (2nd title); Shane Dowling (captain); Declan Hannon (captain)
- Runners-up: Charleville CBS; David Reidy (captain)

Tournament statistics
- Matches played: 26
- Top scorer(s): Liam McGrath (3-45)

The 2010–11 Harty Cup was the 91st staging of the Harty Cup since its establishment by the Munster Council of the Gaelic Athletic Association in 1918. The competition ran from 6 October 2010 to 27 February 2011.

Ardscoil Rís were the defending champions.

The final was played on 27 February 2011 at the Gaelic Grounds in Limerick, between Ardscoil Rís and Charleville CBS, in what was their first ever meeting in the final. Ardscoil Rís won the match by 3–19 to 0–03 to claim their second consecutive Harty Cup title.

Liam McGrath was the top scorer with 3–45.

== Group A ==
=== Group A results ===
| 6 October 2010 Round 1 | Thurles CBS | 1-19 - 1-12 | De La Salle | Cahir Park |
| | A McCormack 0-11 (0-6f); M O’Brien, S Kennedy (0-1f) 0-3 each; K Slattery 1-0; P Ralph (1f), C Hammersley 0-1 each. | Report | D Flynn 0-7 (0-5f, 0-1 65); C Kervick 1-1; J Hayes 0-2 (0-1f); C Morris, D Foley 0-1 each. |

| 6 October 2010 Round 1 | St Flannan's College | 4-11 - 1-16 | Blackwater Community School | Canon Hayes Park |
| | | Report |

| 20 October 2010 Round 2 | St Flannan's College | 3-17 - 1-13 | Thurles CBS | MacDonagh Park |
| | T Kelly 1-10 (1-0 pen, 0-8 frees, 0-1 65); C Doohan 1-2; C O’Gorman 1-0; P Duggan, S O’Donnell, M O’Leary, J Colleran, J Browne, 0-1 each. | Report | S Maher 1-3; A McCormack 0-5 (0-3 frees, 0-1 65); K Slattery 0-2 (0-1 free); C Hammersley, D Burke, S Kennedy, 0-1 each. |

| 3 November 2010 Round 3 | De La Salle | 2-06 - 1-14 | Blackwater Community School | Fraher Field |
| | T Mullally 2-0; D Flynn 0-3 (0-1f); C Morris, E Blanchfield, C Kervick 0-1 each. | Report | S Bennett 0-5 (0-1f); R Barry 0-5; P O’Keeffe 1-0; K Casey 0-2; J Barron 0-1f, P Prendergast 0-1. |

| 17 November 2010 Round 3 | Thurles CBS | 0-13 - 0-10 | Blackwater Community School | Clonmel GAA Ground |
| | M O’Brien 0-5 (0-3 frees); D Burke 0-2; C Hammersley, S Cahill, A McCormack, S Kennedy, S Maher, M Lanigan 0-1 each. | Report | J Barron 0-5 (0-4 frees); R Barry 0-3; J Phelan, P Prendergast 0-1 each. |

| 17 November 2010 Round 3 | St Flannan's College | 5-25 - 2-06 | De La Salle College | Cahir Park |
| | | Report |

== Group B ==
=== Group B results ===
| 6 October 2010 Round 1 | Coláiste Chríost Rí | 5-09 - 4-17 | St Caimin's Community School | Ballyagran Grounds |
| | E Dennehy 2-1; P Fitzgerald 1-2 (1-2 frees); S O’Keeffe 1-1; K Coughlan 1-0; E Finn 0-3 (two frees, one ‘65); T Lawrence, G Joyce (0-1 free) 0-1 each. | Report | A Cunningham 3-8 (0-4 frees); A Mulready, S Liddy 0-3 each; D Ryan 1-0; F Melody (0-1 free), S Lynch, S Kelleher 0-1 each. |

| 6 October 2010 Round 1 | Our Lady's Secondary School | 1-19 - 1-16 | Charleville CBS | Hannon Park |
| | L McGrath 0-8, M Kelly 1-3, J McGrath 0-4, L Treacy 0-2, C O'Riordan 0-1, P Meade 0-1. | | D Reidy 0-7, M Kavanagh 0-4, D McCarthy 1-0, T Rea 0-2, P O'Callaghan 0-1, D Copps 0-1, S Sheedy 0-1. |

| 20 October 2010 Round 2 | Our Lady's Secondary School | 2-19 - 2-13 | St Caimin's Community School | Childers Road |
| | L McGrath 2-8 (0-7f), S Hartnett 0-4, J McGrath 0-3, J Bergin 0-2, L O’Treasaigh, M Kelly 0-1 each. | Report | A Cunningham 2-11, S Liddy, A Mulready 0-1 each. |

| 3 November 2010 Round 3 | Coláiste Chríost Rí | 3-06 - 1-15 | Charleville CBS | Clyda Rovers Grounds |
| | T Lawrence 1-2 (1-0f), S O'Keeffe 1-1, A Nolan 1-0, E Finn (0-1f), E Ahern, E Smith 0-1 each. | Report | P O'Callaghan 0-5 (0-3f), J Morrissey 0-4, M Kavanagh 0-3 (0-1 '65'), D Copps 1-0, D Sheehy, J O'Brien, T Rea 0-1 each. |

| 17 November 2010 Round 3 | St Caimin's Community School | 2-13 - 3-10 | Charleville CBS | Ballybrown Grounds |
| | A Cunningham 1-9 (0-5 frees), A Mulready 1-1, S Lynch 0-2, S Liddy 0-1. | Report | J O’Brien 1-4, P O’Callaghan 1-4 (0-3 frees); D Reidy 1-0, M Kavanagh 0-2 (0-1 free). |

| 17 November 2010 Round 3 | Our Lady's Secondary School | 5-21 - 0-09 | Coláiste Chríost Rí | Ballygiblin grounds |
| | O Jordan 2-2, S Hassett 1-3, L Treacy 0-6, M Kelly 0-4 (0-2f), L McGrath 0-3 (0-2f), J McGrath, E Bourke 1-0 each, B McGrath 0-2, C O'Riordan 0-1. | Report | T Lawrence 0-4 (0-2f), S O'Keeffe 0-2, L Fogarty, I Lucey, E Finn 0-1 each. |

== Group C ==
=== Group C results ===
| 6 October 2010 Round 1 | Nenagh CBS | 2-17 - 2-13 | Midleton CBS | Leahy Park |
| | J Forde 0-11, M Tuite 2-2, P Fogarty 0-3, D Ryan 0-1. | | C Lehane 1-10, D Morrissey 1-2, C Walsh 0-1. |

| 20 October 2010 Round 2 | Nenagh CBS | 3-15 - 1-07 | Coláiste Chiarraí | Newcastle West Grounds |
| | J Forde 0-12, P Shanahan 2-1, M Tuite 1-0, P Fogarty 0-1, D Walsh 0-1. | Report | P Boyle 1-1, V Savage 0-3, D Collins 0-2, D Leahy 0-1. |

| 17 November 2010 Round 3 | Midleton CBS | 7-17 - 2-03 | Coláise Chiarraí | Dr Mannix Sportsfield |
| | D Morrissey 4-4, C lehane 1-7, P White 1-2, M Hennessy 1-1, B Lawton 0-2, D Walsh 0-1. | Report | P Boyle 2-1, T Casey 0-1, K Collins 0-1. |

== Group D ==
=== Group D results ===
| 6 October 2010 Round 1 | Ardscoil Rís | 3-22 - 0-08 | Coláistí na nDéise | Seán Treacy Park |
| | S Dowling 0-10, J Fitzgibbon 2-2, M Carmody 1-5, B O'Connor 0-2, O Hickey 0-2, D Hannon 0-1. | Report | C Curran 0-4, D Breathnach 0-2, B Phelan 0-1, R Dennehy 0-1. |

| 20 October 2010 Round 2 | Ardscoil Rís | 2-19 - 2-14 | St Colman's College | Dr Mannix Sportsfield |
| | M Carmody 0-7, S Dowling 1-2 (1-0f), O Hickey 1-2, J Kelleher, B O'Connor 0-2 each, D Hannon, J Fitzgibbon (0-1f), D Moloney, J Shanahan 0-1 each. | Report | M Spillane 1-9 (1-6f), J Mannix 1-1, M Pyne, D Mangan (0-1f), C Spillane, P Roche 0-1 each. |

| 17 November 2010 Round 3 | St Colman's College | 1-12 - 0-12 | Coláistí na nDéise | Ballyduff Upper Grounds |
| | G Hogan 1-1, M. Spillane 0-4 (0-2 f), N McNamara 0-2, M Pyne, J Mannix, C Spillane, K Morrisson, P Roche 0-1. | Report | C Curran 0-6 (0-4 f), D Breathnach 0-2 , C O’Shea, M Harney 0-1, C Dunford, J Kindregan 0-1. |

== Knockout stage ==
=== Quarter-finals ===
| 19 January 2011 Quarter-final | Our Lady's Secondary School | 1-17 - 3-11 | Midleton CBS | Cahir Park |
| | L McGrath 0-14 (10 frees, 0-1 ‘65, 0-1 sideline); M Kelly 1-1; S Hassett, L Treacy (0-1 each). | Report | C Lehane 2-9 (2-7 frees); D Cahill 1-0; C Walsh, M Hennessy (0-1 each). |

| 19 January 2011 Quarter-final | St Flannan's College | 4-13 - 2-10 | St Colman's College | Dr Mannix Sportsfield |
| | S O'Donnell 2-1, C O'Gorman 1-4, P Duggan 0-4 (1f), J Browne 1-0, T Kelly 0-3 (1f), M O'Leary 0-1. | Report | M Spillane 2-7 (3 65s, 2f), K Morrison, C Spillane, B Carroll 0-1 each. |

| 19 January 2011 Quarter-final | Charleville CBS | 1-12 - 2-06 | Nenagh CBS | Clarina Grounds |
| | P O’Callaghan 0-7 (frees), D Copps 1-0, J O’Brien, T Rea (0-2 each), M O’Loughlin 0-1. | Reprot | J Forde 2-3 (2-2frees), M Tuite 0-3 (0-2 frees, 0-1 65’). |

| 26 January 2010 Quarter-final | Ardscoil Rís | 1-19 - 1-10 | Thurles CBS | Seán Treacy Park |
| | S Dowling 0-9 (0-6 frees); J Fitzgibbon 1-2; O Hickey 0-2; J Shanahan 0-2; K O’Brien, B O’Connor, M Carmody, D Hannon (free), 0-1 each. | Report | A McCormack 0-6 (all frees); K Slattery 1-0; P Ralph, J Meagher, M Sadlier, D Burke, 0-1 each. |

| 26 January 2011 Quarter-final replay | Our Lady's Secondary School | 1-16 - 0-06 | Midleton CBS | Cahir Park |
| | L McGrath 0-6 (5f, 0-1 pen), J Bergin 1-1, M Kelly 0-3, J McGrath & S Hassett 0-2 each, L Treacy & C O’Riordan 0-1 each. | Report | B Lawton (1f) and C Lehane (2f), 0-3 each. |

=== Semi-finals ===
| 6 February 2011 Semi-final | Charleville CBS | 3-17 - 1-09 | Our Lady's Secondary School | Gaelic Grounds |
| | P O’Callaghan 0-9 (0-6 frees); J O’Brien 2-2; M Kavanagh 1-0; T Rea 0-2; D Sheehy, M O’Loughlin, J Morrissey, G Kelleher 0-1 each. | Report | L McGrath 1-6 (1-4 frees, 0-1 65); O Jordan, S Hassett, J McGrath 0-1 each. |

| 6 February 2011 Semi-final | Ardscoil Rís | 2-19 - 0-22 | St Flannan's College | Gaelic Grounds |
| | S Dowling 1-10 (1-7f, 1 '65'), O Hickey 1-1, J Fitzgibbon 0-4, M Carmody 0-3, B O'Connor 0-1. | Report | T Kelly 0-14 (9f, 1 '65'), S O'Donnell 0-4, C O'Gorman 0-3, J Colleran 0-1. |

=== Final ===
| 27 February 2011 Final | Ardscoil Rís | 3-19 - 0-03 | Charleville CBS | Gaelic Grounds |
| | S Dowling 0-5 (4f, 1 '65'), J Fitzgibbon 1-2, O Hickey 1-1, K O'Brien 1-0, J Shanahan 0-3 (2f), A Dempsey, J Kelleher 0-2 each, M Carmody, B O'Connor, D Hannon, M Ryan 0-1 each. | Report | P O'Callaghan 0-3 (2f). |
