= 1995–96 Harty Cup =

Hurling tournament

1995–96 Dr Harty Cup
- Dates: 11 October 1995 – 17 March 1996
- Teams: 16
- Champions: St Colman's College (5th title); Timmy McCarthy (captain); Denis Ring (manager)
- Runners-up: Nenagh CBS; Mark O'Leary (captain); Martin Slattery (manager)

Tournament statistics
- Matches played: 16
- Goals scored: 59 (3.69 per match)
- Points scored: 307 (19.19 per match)
- Top scorer(s): Timmy McCarthy (2-31)

The 1995–96 Harty Cup was the 76th staging of the Harty Cup since its establishment in hurlig by the Munster Council of Gaelic Athletic Association in 1918. The competition ran from 11 October 1995 to 17 March 1996.

Midleton CBS unsuccessfully defended its title, in the quarter-finals lossing to Nenagh CBS.

St Colman's College won the Harty Cup final on 17 March 1996 at Clonmel GAA Ground, against Nenagh CBS, 3–19 to 1–04, in what was their first ever meeting in a final, fifth Harty Cup title overall and their first title 1992.

St Colman's College's Timmy McCarthy was the top scorer with 2-31.

== Results ==
=== First round ===
11 October 1995 First round	Nenagh CBS	2-15 - 3-07	Lismore CBS	Clonmel GAA Ground
	J Slattery 1-5, M O'Leary 1-3, A Quinn 0-2, P Hackett 0-2, J Ryan 0-1, R Flannery 0-1, P Ryan 0-1.		S Curley 1-4, J Twomey 1-1, M Ormond 1-0, E Bennett 0-2.

11 October 1995 First round	Midleton CBS	1-13 - 1-09	Limerick CBS	FitzGerald Park
	C Cusack 1-3, L Walsh 0-5, S Dunne 0-4, D O'Sullivan 0-1.		P Cahill 1-2, G Stanners 0-2, D O'Brien 0-2, B Hartigan 0-1, D Lavery 0-1, J McElligott 0-1.

11 October 1995 First round	North Monastery	3-15 - 1-04	Coláiste Chríost Rí	Páirc Uí Rinn
	N Harte 2-3, A Coughlan 0-6, G O'Halloran 1-1, B Hennebry 0-2, J Hynes 0-1, J Walsh 0-1, L Cunningham 0-1.		M Keohane 1-0, J Nagle 0-2, C McCarthy 0-1, R Cronin 0-1.

11 October 1995 First round	St Patrick's Comprehensive School	0-01 - 4-23	St Flannan's College	Cusack Park
	G Earls 0-1.		R Gantley 3-1, A Markham 0-9, J Pyne 0-3, D Vaughan 0-3, D Kennedy 0-2, T Lynch 0-1, J Reddan 0-1, S Fitzpatrick 0-1, R Tierney 0-1, E Tuohy 0-1.

11 October 1995 First round	Abbey CBS	0-04 - 2-20	St Colman's College	Mitchelstown Grounds
	B Maguire 0-2, T Fogarty 0-1, P Moore 0-1.		T McCarthy 0-12, D McInerney 1-3, E Pierce 1-2, D Barry 0-2, J McCarthy 0-1.

11 October 1995 First round	De La Salle College Waterford	2-05 - 3-13	St Finbarr's College	Cappoquin Grounds
	L Lalor 2-0, K Cunningham 0-2, S O'Keeffe 0-1, D Mackey 0-1, R Walsh 0-1.		P Kelly 1-4, J Murphy 1-2, C O'Regan 1-1, D Gardiner 0-3, D Kenny 0-1, J O'Brien 0-1, J Horgan 0-1.

11 October 1995 First round	Doon CBS	4-10 - 3-05	Our Lady's Secondary School	Leahy Park
	D Anderson 2-2, J Butler 1-4, K Hickey 1-1, S Ryan 0-2, N Hayes 0-1.		K Dunne 1-4, B Fogarty 1-0, A Doyle 1-0, J O'Connor 0-1.

18 October 1995 First round	Thurles CBS	3-04 - 2-08	Charleville CBS	Cappamore Grounds
	V Coughlan 2-1, M Esmond 1-0, D Butler 0-1, J Kavanagh 0-1, P O'Brien 0-1.		N Ronan 1-4, B Foley 1-0, T Barry 0-2, P Goold 0-2.

=== Quarter-finals ===
15 November 1995 Quarter-final	Nenagh CBS	1-14 - 2-11	Midleton CBS	Clonmel GAA Ground
	M O'Leary 0-7, D Brislane 1-0, J Slattery 0-2, P Ryan 0-2, J Ryan 0-2, P Hackett 0-1.		L Walsh 0-7, D Healy 1-0, D O'Sullivan 1-0, S Dunne 0-2, L Moynihan 0-2.

15 November 1995 Quarter-final	Charleville CBS	0-06 - 2-08	North Monastery	FitzGerald Park
	N Ronan 0-3, P Goold 0-1, K O'Dwyer 0-1.		S O'Connell 2-1, B Hennebry 0-4, A Coughlan 0-1, G O'Callaghan 0-1.

15 November 1995 Quarter-final	St Finbarr's College	2-09 - 3-07	Doon CBS	Mitchelstown Grounds
	P Kelly 0-6, J Murphy 1-0, A Cambridge 1-0, D Gardiner 0-2, C Kennedy 0-1.		D Stapleton 2-1, E Ryan 1-0, N Hayes 0-3, M Kirby 0-1, S Ryan 0-1, D Anderson 0-1.

18 November 1995 Quarter-final	St Flannan's College	1-05 - 0-12	St Colman's College	Ballyagran Grounds
	R Gantley 1-5.		T McCarthy 0-7, J McCarthy 0-2, O Murphy 0-2, W O'Donoghue 0-1.

5 December 1995 Quarter-final replay	Nenagh CBS	3-10 - 1-05	Midleton CBS	Clonmel GAA Ground
	P Ryan 2-1, M O'Leary 0-7, J Slattery 1-1, P Hackett 0-1.		S Dunne 1-0, L Walsh 0-3, V Cusack 0-1, D O'Sullivan 0-1.

=== Semi-finals ===
18 February 1996 Semi-final	St Colman's College	6-17 - 0-01	Doon CBS	Mitchelstown Grounds
	T McCarthy 2-6, J McCarthy 2-4, W O'Donoghue 1-1, S Murphy 1-1, D McInerney 0-3, D Barry 0-1, E Pierce 0-1.		D Stapleton 0-1.

25 February 1996 Semi-final	Nenagh CBS	0-13 - 0-10	North Monastery	Fr Con Buckley Park
	M O'Leary 0-6, P Ryan 0-3, P Hackett 0-2, D Burke 0-1, J Slattery 0-1.		B Hennebry 0-7, S O'Connell 0-3.

=== Final ===
17 March 1996 Final	St Colman's College	3-19 - 1-04	Nenagh CBS	Clonmel GAA Ground
	E Pierce 2-2, J McCarthy 1-3, T McCarthy 0-6, D Barry 0-2, W O'Donoghue 0-2, E Murphy 0-1, L Mannix 0-1, W Twomey 0-1, S Murphy 0-1.		J Slattery 1-0, M O'Leary 0-2, P Ryan 0-2.	Referee: J Sexton (Limerick)

== Statistics ==
=== Top scorers ===
Rank	Player	County	Tally	Total	Matches	Average
1	Timmy McCarthy	St Colman's College	2-31	37	4	9.25
2	Mark O'Leary	Nenagh CBS	1-25	28	5	5.60
3	James McCarthy	St Colman's College	3-10	19	4	4.75
4	Rory Gantley	St Flannan's College	4-06	18	2	9.00
4	John Slattery	Nenagh CBS	3-09	18	5	3.60
6	Paul Ryan	Nenagh CBS	2-09	15	5	3.00
7	Liam Walsh	Midleton CBS	0-15	15	3	5.00
8	Elton Pierce	St Colman's College	3-05	14	4	3.50
9	Peter Kelly	St Finbarr's College	1-10	13	2	6.50
9	Barry Hennebry	North Monastery	0-13	13	3	4.33
