= Kieran Bennett =

Irish hurler

Personal information
- Native name: Ciarán Beinéid (Irish)
- Born: 21 November 1994 (age 31) Ballysaggart, County Waterford, Ireland
- Height: 6 ft 0 in (183 cm)

Sport
- Sport: Hurling
- Position: Half-back
Club
- Years: Club
- Ballysaggart
Club titles
- Waterford titles: 0
Inter-county*
Years	County	Apps (scores)
2016-	Waterford	1 (0-0)
Inter-county titles
- Munster titles: 0
- All-Irelands: 0
- NHL: 0
- All Stars: 0
- *Inter County team apps and scores correct as of 18:48, 27 July 2015.

Kieran Bennett (born 21 November 1994) is an Irish hurler who plays for the Waterford senior team. Bennett made his championship debut for Waterford on 13 August 2017 in the 2017 All-Ireland semi-final win against Cork.

His younger brothers, Stephen and Shane Bennett also play with Waterford.

== Honours ==
=== Player ===
Ballysaggart

- Munster Junior Club Hurling Championship (1): 2013
- Waterford Junior Hurling Championship (1): 2013
