= 1997 Cork Junior A Hurling Championship =

1997 Cork Junior Hurling Championship
- Dates: 27 September – 30 November 1997
- Teams: 7
- Champions: Castlelyons (1st title); William O'Riordan (captain); Pa Finn (manager)
- Runners-up: Courcey Rovers

Tournament statistics
- Matches played: 6
- Goals scored: 23 (3.83 per match)
- Points scored: 126 (21 per match)
- Top scorer(s): John Murphy (4-06)

The 1997 Cork Junior Hurling Championship was the 100th staging of the Cork Junior Hurling Championship since its establishment by the Cork County Board in 1895. The championship began on 27 September 1997 and ended on 30 November 1997.

On 30 November 1997, Castlelyons won the championship after a 2-09 to 1-11 defeat of Courcey Rovers in the final at Páirc Uí Rinn. It remains their only championship title in the grade.

== Qualification ==
The Cork Junior Hurling Championship featured seven teams in the final tournament. Over 70 teams contested the seven divisional championships with the seven respective champions qualifying for the county championship.

Division	Championship	Champions
Avondhu	North Cork Junior A Hurling Championship	Shanballymore
Carbery	South West Junior A Hurling Championship	Ballinascarty
Carrigdhoun	South East Junior A Hurling Championship	Courcey Rovers
Duhallow	Duhallow Junior A Hurling Championship	Freemount
Imokilly	East Cork Junior A Hurling Championship	Castlelyons
Muskerry	Mid Cork Junior A Hurling Championship	Ballinora
Seandún	City Junior A Hurling Championship	Na Piarsaigh

== Results ==
=== Quarter-finals ===
27 September 1997 Quarter-final	Courcey Rovers	4-11 - 2-07	Shanballymore	Riverstown Sporstfield
	B Hayes 2-2, J Murphy 2-1, J Hayes 0-5, S Hayes 0-2, C O'Regan 0-1.		P Burke 2-0, I Mellerick 0-3, D Curtin 0-2, V Burke 0-1, P Sheehy 0-1.	Referee: P Nolan (Na Piarsaigh)

27 September 1997 Quarter-final	Na Piarsaigh	1-07 - 0-09	Freemount	Coachford Sporstfield
	P O'Flynn 1-0, D Gardiner 0-2, M McSweeney 0-2, C O'Sullivan 0-2, A Daly 0-1.		D Broderick 0-3, A Keane 0-3, J O'Flynn 0-1, B Gardiner 0-1, G Withers 0-1.	Referee: P Hogan (Carrigtwohill)

19 October 1997 Quarter-final	Castlelyons	2-23 - 2-09	Ballinascarty	Páirc Uí Rinn
	E Fitzgerald 0-9, T McCarthy 2-1, S McAuliffe 0-4, T Hickey 0-3, P Murphy 0-2, B Fitzgerald 0-1, S Cotter 0-1, P O'Brien 0-1, P Cashman 0-1.		C Murphy 1-6, W Deasy 1-1, J Kingston 0-1, K Ryan 0-1.	Referee: W Horgan (Brian Dillons)

=== Semi-finals ===
26 October 1997 Semi-final	Courcey Rovers	4-15 -1-08	Na Piarsaigh	Páirc Liam Mhic Cárthaigh
	J Murphy 2-3, S Twomey 2-0, J Hayes 0-5, S Hayes 0-3, B Hayes 0-2, C O'Regan 0-1, D Hayes 0-1.		C O'Sullivan 1-1, M McSweeney 0-4, T Hickey 0-1, M O'Sullivan 0-1, P O'Flynn 0-1.	Referee: L O'Flynn (Éire Óg)

2 November 1997 Semi-final	Castlelyons	3-15 - 1-02	Ballinora	Páirc Uí Chaoimh
	M Spillane 1-2, S McAuliffe 1-1, E Fitzgerald 0-4, T McCarthy 0-4, P Cashman 0-3, P O'Brien 0-1.		P O'Mahony 1-0, M Murphy 0-1, K Conway 0-1.	Referee: K Hurley (Ballymartle)

=== Final ===
30 November 1997 Final	Courcey Rovers	1-11 - 2-09	Castlelyons	Páirc Uí Rinn
	J Hayes 0-7, B Hayes 1-0, J Murphy 0-2, C O'Regan 0-1, D Hayes 0-1.		P Cashman 1-1, E Fitzgerald 0-4, P O'Brien 1-0, S McAuliffe 0-3 S Cotter 0-1.

== Championship statistics ==
=== Top scorers ===
Top scorers overall

Rank	Player	Club	Tally	Total	Matches	Average
1	John Murphy	Courcey Rovers	4-06	18	3	6.00
2	Jamie Hayes	Courcey Rovers	0-17	17	3	5.66
2	Eoin Fitzgerald	Castlelyons	0-17	17	3	5.66
4	Brian Hayes	Courcey Rovers	3-04	13	3	4.33
5	Timmy McCarthy	Castlelyons	2-05	11	3	3.66
5	Sylvester McAuliffe	Castlelyons	1-08	11	3	3.66

Top scorers in a single game

Rank	Player	Club	Tally	Total	Opposition
1	John Murphy	Courcey Rovers	2-03	9	Na Piarsaigh
1	Eoin Fitzgerald	Castlelyons	0-09	9	Ballinascarty
3	Brian Hayes	Courcey Rovers	2-02	8	Shanballymore
4	John Murphy	Courcey Rovers	2-01	7	Shanballymore
4	Timmy McCarthy	Castlelyons	2-01	7	Ballinascarty
4	Jamie Hayes	Courcey Rovers	0-07	7	Castlelyons
7	Paul Burke	Shanballymore	2-00	6	Courcey Rovers
7	Séamus Twomey	Courcey Rovers	2-00	6	Na Piarsaigh
9	Mick Spillane	Castlelyons	1-02	5	Ballinora
9	Jamie Hayes	Courcey Rovers	0-05	5	Shanballymore
9	Jamie Hayes	Courcey Rovers	0-05	5	Na Piarsaigh
