= Ronan Connolly =

Irish hurler (born 1999)

Personal information
- Native name: Rónán Ó Conghaile (Irish)
- Born: 1999 (age 26–27) Adare, County Limerick, Ireland

Sport
- Sport: Hurling
- Position: Left corner-back
Club
- Years: Club
- Adare
Club titles
- Limerick titles: 0
College
- Years: College
- 2018-2022: University College Cork
College titles
- Fitzgibbon titles: 1
Inter-county*
| Years | County | Apps (scores) |
| 2018-present | Limerick | 0 (0-00) |
Inter-county titles
- Munster titles: 4
- All-Irelands: 4
- NHL: 3
- All Stars: 0
- *Inter County team apps and scores correct as of 22:23, 23 July 2023.

Ronan Connolly (born 1999) is an Irish hurler who plays for Limerick Senior Championship club Adare and at inter-county level with the Limerick senior hurling team. He usually lines out as a left corner-back.

== Career ==
Connolly first played hurling at juvenile and underage levels with the Adare club, while also playing as a schoolboy with Ardscoil Rís. He won a Harty Cup title in 2016, before captaining Ardscoil Rís to a second Harty Cup in 2018. Connolly later lined out with University College Cork and was an unused substitute when the Fitzgibbon Cup title was won in 2020.

Connolly first appeared on the inter-county scene with Limerick as a member of the minor team in 2017. He later spent one season with the under-20 team. Connolly was called into the senior team in advance of the pre-season 2019 Munster SHL. He was on the 41-man panel that won the National Hurling League title later that season, but was released prior to the start of the championship. Connolly later returned and was part of the Limerick panel that won four successive All-Ireland SHC titles from 2020 to 2023.

== Career statistics ==
As of match played 11 February 2024.

| Team | Year | National League | | | Munster | | All-Ireland | | Total | |
| Team | Year | Division | Apps | Score | Apps | Score | Apps | Score | Apps | Score |
|---|---|---|---|---|---|---|---|---|---|---|
| Limerick | 2019 | Division 1A | 0 | 0-00 | — | | — | | 0 | 0-00 |
| Limerick | 2020 | Division 1A | 0 | 0-00 | 0 | 0-00 | 0 | 0-00 | 0 | 0-00 |
| Limerick | 2021 | Division 1A | 2 | 0-00 | 0 | 0-00 | 0 | 0-00 | 2 | 0-00 |
| Limerick | 2022 | Division 1A | 2 | 0-01 | 0 | 0-00 | 0 | 0-00 | 2 | 0-01 |
| Limerick | 2023 | Division 1A | 1 | 0-00 | 0 | 0-00 | 0 | 0-00 | 1 | 0-00 |
| | 2024 | | 1 | 0-00 | 0 | 0-00 | 0 | 0-00 | 1 | 0-00 |
| Career total | | | 6 | 0-01 | 0 | 0-00 | 0 | 0-00 | 6 | 0-01 |

== Honours ==
Ardscoil Rís

- Dr Harty Cup: 2016, 2018 (c)
- Dean Ryan Cup (1): 2016

University College Cork

- Fitzgibbon Cup: 2020

Limerick

- All-Ireland Senior Hurling Championship: 2020, 2021, 2022, 2023
- Munster Senior Hurling Championship: 2020, 2021, 2022, 2023
- National Hurling League: 2019, 2020, 2023
