= 1998 All-Ireland Minor Hurling Championship =

All-Ireland Minor Hurling Championship 1998
Championship Details
- Dates: 22 April 1998 - 13 September 1998
- Teams: 15

All Ireland Champions
- Winners: Cork (17th win)
- Captain: Cathal McCarthy
- Manager: Denis Burns

All Ireland Runners-up
- Runners-up: Kilkenny
- Captain: Paul Shefflin
- Manager: Bobby Jackman

Provincial Champions
- Munster: Cork
- Leinster: Kilkenny
- Ulster: Antrim
- Connacht: Not Played

Championship Statistics
- Matches Played: 17
- Top Scorer: Leon O'Connell (3-37)

The 1998 All-Ireland Minor Hurling Championship was the 68th staging of the All-Ireland Minor Hurling Championship since its establishment by the Gaelic Athletic Association in 1928. The championship began on 22 April 1998 and ended on 13 September 1998.

Clare entered the championship as the defending champions, however, they were beaten by Cork in the Munster final.

On 13 September 1998, Cork won the championship following a 2-15 to 1-09 defeat of Kilkenny in the All-Ireland final. This was their 17th All-Ireland title overall and their first title since 1995.

Wexford's Leon O'Connell was the championship's top scorer with 3-37.

== Results ==
=== Leinster Minor Hurling Championship ===
First round

10 May 1998 First round	Wexford	2-11 - 0-09	Dublin	Dr. Cullen Park, Carlow
	L O'Connell 1-2, M Travers 0-4, G Coleman 1-0, D Stamp 0-2, MJ Furlong 0-1, K O'Grady 0-1, M Jacob 0-1.		W McCarthy 0-4, M Ryan 0-2, D Donnelly 0-2, C Dooley 0-1.	Referee: P Dunphy (Kilkenny)

Semi-finals

23 May 1998 Semi-final	Wexford	1-14 - 1-06	Laois	Dr. Cullen Park, Carlow
	L O'Connell 1-9, M Travers 0-1, D Stamp 0-1, M Jacob 0-1, N Lambert 0-1, J McDonald 0-1.		T Russell 1-2, D Keenan 0-2, D Walsh 0-1, K Grant 0-1.

23 May 1998 Semi-final	Kilkenny	2-19 - 0-09	Offaly	O'Moore Park, Portlaoise
	G Cleere 1-4, J Murray 1-4, K Rafter 0-3, K Power 0-3, K Moore 0-2, B Phelan 0-1, P Sheeran 0-1, J Morgan 0-1.		D Carney 0-4, C Gath 0-1, B Keeshan 0-1, E Molloy 0-1, N Murphy 0-1, N Mannion 0-1.	Referee: E Morris (Dublin)

Finals

5 July 1998 Final	Kilkenny	1-11 - 1-11	Wexford	Croke Park, Dublin
	K Power 0-5, K Rafter 1-0, G Cleere 0-2, J Murray 0-2, P Sheehan 0-1, B Phelan 0-1.		L O'Connell 0-7, M Jacob 1-1, K O'Grady 0-2, MJ Furlong 0-1.	Referee: E Morris (Dublin)

18 July 1998 Final replay	Kilkenny	2-15 - 0-06	Wexford	Dr. Cullen Park, Carlow
	K Power 0-9, K Murray 1-1, G Cleere 1-1, J Morgan 0-2, K Moore 0-1, K Rafter 0-1.		L O'Connell 0-5, M Travers 0-1.

=== Munster Minor Hurling Championship ===
First round

22 April 1998 First round	Limerick	0-10 - 1-11	Clare	Gaelic Grounds, Limerick
	C Fitzgerald 0-5, S O'Connor 0-2, M Keane 0-2, C Moriarty 0-1.		D Fitzsimons 1-2, J Casey 0-5, P McKeogh 0-2, B Clancy 0-1, G Quinn 0-1.	Referee: L O'Flynn (Cork)

1 May 1998 First round	Waterford	3-12 - 0-06	Kerry	Castle Farm Grounds, Lismore
	E McGrath 1-8, G Hurney 1-0, D Connolly 1-0, D Kelly 0-2, S Prendergast 0-2.		B O'Sullivan 0-4, L Boyle 0-1, D Clifford 0-1.	Referee: TJ Corby (Tipperary)

Semi-finals

1 July 1998 Semi-final	Clare	1-17 - 1-11	Tipperary	Gaelic Grounds, Limerick
	P McKeogh 1-6, J Casey 0-4, T Carmody 0-3, G Considine 0-2, D Fitzsimons 0-1, G Quinn 0-1.		E Kelly 0-8, S Butler 1-0, A Kennedy 0-1, D Shelly 0-1, K Cummins 0-1.

1 July 1998 Semi-final	Waterford	0-08 - 2-11	Cork	Fraher Field, Dungarvan
	E McGrath 0-4, T Maher 0-2, J Mullane 0-1, D Kelly 0-1.		E Fitzgerald 1-2, V Cusack 1-0, G McCarthy 0-3, P Murphy 0-2, C McCarthy 0-1, D Broderick 0-1, J Barrett 0-1, M Fitzgerald 0-1.

Final

12 July 1998 Final	Cork	3-13 - 0-08	Clare	Semple Stadium, Thurles
	E Fitzgerald 0-8, C McCarthy 1-2, G McCarthy 1-1, V Cusack 1-0, N McCarthy 0-1, D Broderick 0-1.		P McKeogh 0-2, T Griffin 0-2, C Earlie 0-1, C Plunkett 0-1, D Fitzsimons 0-1, G Quinn 0-1.	Referee: P Moore (Waterford)

=== Ulster Minor Hurling Championship ===
Semi-final

21 June 1998 Semi-final	Derry	4-12 - 1-13	Down	Casement Park, Belfast
	C Brunton 0-7, B McBride 2-0, A Quigg 1-1, V Kennedy 1-0, B Brunton 0-1, S Kelly 0-1, P Gallagher 0-1, P Kelly 0-1.		A Falcona 0-6, P Braniff 1-1, A Savage 0-2, G Carson 0-1, R Fryar 0-1, B Murray 0-1, A O'Prey 0-1.

Final

5 July 1998 Final	Antrim	3-09 - 0-08	Derry	Casement Park, Belfast
	K Elliott 1-2, C O'Connell 1-1, D Mort 1-0, G McFall 0-2, C McGourty 0-2, J Grieces 0-1, L Forsyth 0-1.		C Brunton 0-5, S Brunton 0-1, R McColgan 0-1, M Kidd 0-1.	Referee: G Devlin (Armagh)

=== All-Ireland Minor Hurling Championship ===
Quarter-finals

25 July 1998 Quarter-final	Wexford	2-14 - 1-09	Antrim	Drogheda
	L O'Connell 1-5, A Walsh 1-1, D Stamp 0-3, B Lambert 0-3, M Jacob 0-1, K O'Grady 0-1.		K McMullan 1-2, C Herron 0-2, P Kelly 0-2, G McFall 0-2, C McGourty 0-1.	Referee: L Flynn (Cork)

26 July 1998 Quarter-final	Galway	1-12 - 2-08	Clare	Croke Park, Dublin
	C Coen 0-6, H Whiriskey 1-0, K Daniels 0-2, G Keary 0-2, K Hayes 0-1, D Joyce 0-1.		C Considine 0-4, T Griffin 1-0, D Fitzsimons 1-0, B Clancy 0-3, P McKeogh 0-1.	Referee: G Devlin (Armagh)

Semi-finals

9 August 1998 Semi-final	Cork	0-12 - 0-10	Wexford	Croke Park, Dublin
	E Fitzgerald 0-8, C McCarthy 0-2, J Barrett 0-2.		L O'Connell 0-9, D Stamp 0-1.	Referee: T McIntyre (Antrim)

16 August 1999 Semi-final	Kilkenny	2-10 - 1-12	Galway	Croke Park, Dublin
	J Murray 2-1, K Power 0-3, M Rafter 0-2, B Phelan 0-2, J Coogan 0-1, G Cleere 0-1.		K Daniels 1-2, G Keary 0-4, C Coen 0-2, K Hayes 0-1, H Whiriskey 0-1, D Donoghue 0-1, K Brady 0-1.	Referee: G Devlin (Armagh)

Final

13 September 1998 Final	Cork	2-15 - 1-09	Kilkenny	Croke Park, Dublin
	E Fitzgerald 0-6, C McCarthy 1-1, J Barrett 1-1, N McCarthy 0-3, J Egan 0-2, A O'Connor 0-1, V Cusack 0-1.	Report	K Power 0-6, K Rafter 1-1, G Cleere 0-2.	Referee: G Devlin (Armagh)

== Championship statistics ==
=== Top scorers ===
Top scorers overall

Rank	Player	Club	Tally	Total	Matches	Average
1	Leon O'Connell	Wexford	3-37	46	6	7.66
2	Eoin Fitzgerald	Cork	1-24	27	4	6.75
3	Kevin Power	Kilkenny	0-26	26	5	5.20
4	Joey Murray	Kilkenny	3-07	16	5	3.20
4	Gearóid Cleere	Kilkenny	2-10	16	5	3.20
5	Eoin McGrath	Waterford	1-12	15	2	7.50
6	Pádraig McKeogh	Clare	1-11	14	4	3.50
7	Cathal McCarthy	Cork	2-06	12	4	3.00
7	Cathal Brunton	Derry	0-12	12	2	6.00
8	Kieran Rafter	Kilkenny	2-05	11	5	2.20

Top scorers in a single game

Rank	Player	Club	Tally	Total	Opposition
1	Leon O'Connell	Wexford	1-09	12	Laois
2	Eoin McGrath	Waterford	1-08	11	Kerry
3	Pádraig McKeogh	Clare	1-06	9	Tipperary
3	Kevin Power	Kilkenny	0-09	9	Wexford
3	Leon O'Connell	Wexford	0-09	9	Cork
4	Leon O'Connell	Wexford	1-05	8	Antrim
4	Eoin Kelly	Tipperary	0-08	8	Clare
4	Eoin Fitzgerald	Cork	0-08	8	Clare
4	Eoin Fitzgerald	Cork	0-08	8	Wexford
5	Joey Murray	Kilkenny	2-01	7	Galway
5	Gearóid Cleere	Kilkenny	1-04	7	Offaly
5	Joey Murray	Kilkenny	1-04	7	Offaly
5	Leon O'Connell	Wexford	0-07	7	Kilkenny
5	Cathal Brunton	Derry	0-07	7	Down
