= Timmy McCarthy =

Irish retired hurler (born 1977)

Personal information
- Nickname: Tic Tac
- Born: 7 September 1977 (age 49) Castlelyons, County Cork, Ireland
- Occupation: Farmer
- Height: 6 ft 1 in (185 cm)

Sport
- Sport: Hurling
- Position: Left wing-forward
Clubs*
Years	Club	Apps (scores)
1994-2013 1996-1998	Castlelyons; Imokilly	35 (10-136); 14 (3-18)
Club titles
- Cork titles: 2
Inter-county**
Years	County	Apps (scores)
1998–2010	Cork	47 (4–36)
Inter-county titles
- Munster titles: 5
- All-Irelands: 3
- NHL: 1
- All Stars: 0
- * club appearances and scores correct as of 17:41, 18 April 2019. **Inter County team apps and scores correct as of 21:44, 6 August 2014.

Timmy McCarthy (born 7 September 1977) is an Irish retired hurler who played for East Cork club Castlelyons. He played for the Cork senior hurling team for 12 seasons, during which time he usually lined out as a right wing-forward.

McCarthy began his hurling career at club level with Castlelyons. He broke onto the club's top adult team as a 16-year-old in 1994 and enjoyed his first success three years later when the club won the 1997 Cork Junior Championship title and promotion. Further promotion followed when he won a Cork Intermediate Championship title in 1998. McCarthy has made 58 championship appearances in four different grades of hurling for the club, while his early prowess also saw him selected for the Imokilly divisional team with whom he won back-to-back Cork Senior Championship titles 1997 and 1998.

At inter-county level, McCarthy was part of the successful Cork minor team that won the All-Ireland Championship in 1995 before later winning back-to-back All-Ireland Championships with the under-21 team in 1997 and 1998. After winning an All-Ireland Championship with the intermediate team in 1997, he joined the Cork senior team in 1998. From his debut, McCarthy was ever-present as a wing-forward and made a combined total of 91 National League and Championship appearances in a career that ended with his last game in 2009. During that time he was part of three All-Ireland Championship-winning teams – in 1999, 2004 and 2005. McCarthy also secured five Munster Championship medals and a National Hurling League medal. His retirement from inter-county hurling was confirmed on 12 January 2010.

McCarthy is one of only a handful of players to have won the complete set of Munster Championship medals - minor, under-21, junior, intermediate and senior. At inter-provincial level, he was selected to play in one championship campaign with Munster, with his sole Railway Cup medal being won in 2007.

== Playing career ==
=== College ===
McCarthy enjoyed much success during his tenure as a student at St. Colman's College. After winning two Dean Ryan Cup medals, he was appointed captain of the senior team in 1996. He won a Harty Cup medal that year following a 3–19 to 1–4 trouncing of Nenagh CBS. All-Ireland kingpins St. Kieran's College provided the opposition in the subsequent All-Ireland final. A 1–14 to 2–6 defeat was the result on that occasion.

=== Club ===
In 1997 McCarthy helped his club Castlelyons to the final of the county junior championship. A late point from a penalty earned Castlelyons a hard-fought 2–9 to 1–11 victory over Courcey Rovers. It was McCarthy's first championship medal.

After gaining promotion to the intermediate grade, Castlelyons qualified for the decider at the first time of asking in 1998. A 2–12 to 2–9 defeat of Killeagh gave Castlelyons the victory and gave McCarthy a championship medal.

McCarthy also played a key role for the Imokilly divisional team during their most successful period in the senior championship. In 1997 he won a championship medal following a 1–18 to 2–12 defeat of Sarsfield's. McCarthy added a second senior championship medal to his collection in 1998 as Imokilly retained their title with a 1–10 to 1–5 defeat of Blackrock.

=== Minor, under-21 and intermediate ===
McCarthy first played for Cork as a dual minor in 1995. After being shocked by Tipperary in the Munster football decider, he later collected a Munster medal with the hurlers following a 3–18 to 0–10 trouncing of Waterford. Cork later qualified for the All-Ireland final against Kilkenny with McCarthy lining out at centre-forward. The game turned into a rout as Cork easily won by 2–10 to 1–2, giving McCarthy an All-Ireland Minor Hurling Championship medal.

The following year McCarthy moved onto the Cork under-21 team. He won his first Munster medal as a non-playing substitute following a 3–16 to 2–7 defeat of Clare.

McCarthy was a regular member of the under-21 team in 1997 as Cork faced Tipperary in the provincial decider. With time running out Tipp were leading my two points, however, McCarthy scored a vital goal after a remarkable solo effort to secure a 1–11 to 0–13 victory. The subsequent All-Ireland decider saw Galway providing the opposition. Cork made amends for their defeat by Galway in the previous year's semi-final with a 3–11 to 0–13 victory. Not only was in McCarthy's first All-Ireland medal in the grade but it was Cork's 100th All-Ireland championship in the history of the Gaelic Athletic Association.

1998 saw Cork maintaining their provincial under-21 dominance with McCarthy collecting a second Munster medal following a 3–18 to 1–10 victory over Tipperary. For the second year in-a-row Cork later faced Galway in the All-Ireland decider. In a close game Cork just about secured a 2–15 to 2–10 victory, with McCarthy adding a second All-Ireland medal to his collection.

By this stage McCarthy had also been added to the Cork intermediate hurling team. He won a Munster medal in this grade in 1997 following a 1–15 to 1–12 defeat of Limerick. McCarthy later collected an All-Ireland medal following a 2–11 to 1–12 defeat of Galway.

=== Senior ===
McCarthy was added to the Cork senior panel for the 1998 National Hurling League. He was an unused substitute as Cork defeated Waterford by 2–14 to 0–13 in the league decider. McCarthy was later included on Cork's championship panel.

On 13 June 1999 McCarthy made his senior championship debut for Cork in a 0–24 to 1–15 Munster semi-final defeat of Waterford. After a seven-year hiatus Cork subsequently claimed the provincial title. A 1–15 to 0–14 defeat of three-in-a-row hopefuls Clare gave McCarthy his first Munster medal. Cork later faced Kilkenny in the All-Ireland decider on 12 September 1999. In a dour contest played on a wet day, Cork trailed by 0–5 to 0–4 after a low-scoring first half. Kilkenny increased the pace after the interval, pulling into a four-point lead. Cork moved up a gear and through Joe Deane, Ben O'Connor and Seánie McGrath Cork scored five unanswered points. Kilkenny could only manage one more score – a point from a Henry Shefflin free – and Cork held out to win by 0–13 to 0–12. It was McCarthy's first All-Ireland medal.

McCarthy won a second Munster medal in 2000, as Cork retained their title following a 0–23 to 3–12 defeat of Tipperary.

Embarrassing defeats for Cork in 2001 and 2002 saw the team reach rock bottom and call a players' strike just before Christmas in 2002. Had the strike failed it could have meant the end of McCarthy's and his and his teammates' careers, however, in the end the county board relented and met the demands.

In 2003 Cork's players were vindicated in taking a stand as the team won the provincial decider following an exciting 3–16 to 3–12 defeat of Waterford. The subsequent All-Ireland final on 14 September 2003 saw Cork face Kilkenny for the first time in four years. Both teams remained level for much of the game, exchanging tit-for-tat scores. A Setanta Ó hAilpín goal gave Cork the advantage, however, a Martin Comerford goal five minutes from the end settled the game as Kilkenny went on to win by 1–14 to 1–11.

After facing a narrow 3–16 to 1–21 defeat by Waterford in one of the greatest Munster finals of all-time in 2004, Cork worked their way through the qualifiers. McCarthy was dropped for Cork's game against Tipperary, however, he was introduced as a substitute and scored a goal that turned the game in Cork's favour. He later regained his place on the starting fifteen for Cork's All-Ireland final meeting with Kilkenny on 12 September 2004. The game was expected to be a classic, however, a rain-soaked day made conditions difficult as Kilkenny aimed to secure a third successive championship. The first half was a low-scoring affair and provided little excitement for fans, however, the second half saw Cork completely take over. For the last twenty-three minutes Cork scored nine unanswered points and went on to win the game by 0–17 to 0–9. It was McCarthy's second All-Ireland medal.

McCarthy won his fourth Munster medal in 2005 following a 1–21 to 1–16 defeat of old rivals Tipperary. On 11 September 2005 Cork faced surprise semi-final winners Galway in the All-Ireland decider. A sixteenth minute Ben O'Connor goal gave Cork the platform needed to withstand a Galway fightback through a Damien Hayes goal, which brought Galway within a point with twenty-one minutes remaining. Galway failed to score for the last ten minutes as Cork claimed a 1–21 to 1–16 score line. It was McCarthy's third All-Ireland medal.

Cork retained their provincial crown in 2006. Goalkeeper Donal Óg Cusack stopped two certain goals in the first half to help Cork to a 2–14 to 1–14 victory and a fifth Munster medal for McCarthy. On 3 September 2006 Cork had the opportunity to become the first side in nearly thirty years to secure three successive All-Ireland champions as they faced Kilkenny in the decider. Like previous encounters neither side took a considerable lead, however, Kilkenny had a vital goal from Aidan Fogarty. Cork were in arrears coming into the final few minutes, however, Ben O'Connor scored a late goal for Cork. It was too little too late as the Cats denied Cork on a score line of 1–16 to 1–13.

In spite of having contested the four previous All-Ireland finals, Cork's fortunes took a downturn over the following few years. A winter of discontent followed for the Cork senior hurling team following the unwanted reappointment of Gerald McCarthy as manager. Following a strike by the players the manager eventually stepped down in March 2009. In spite of being one of the striking players, McCarthy returned to inter-county hurling under new boss Denis Walsh.

McCarthy played his last championship game for Cork on 18 July 2009 in a 1–19 to 0–15 All-Ireland qualifier defeat by Galway.

=== Inter-provincial ===
McCarthy has also played with Munster in the inter-provincial championship. He first lined out for his province in 2007 as Munster recorded a controversial 2–22 to 2–19 victory over Connacht under lights at Croke Park.

== Career statistics ==
=== Club ===
Team	Year	Cork JHC	
Team	Year	Apps	Score
Castlelyons	1994	—	
Castlelyons	1995	—	
Castlelyons	1996	—	
Castlelyons	1997	3	2-05
Castlelyons	Total	3	2-05
Castlelyons	Year	Cork IHC	
Castlelyons	Year	Apps	Score
Castlelyons	1998	5	2-14
Castlelyons	Total	5	2-14
Castlelyons	Year	Cork SHC	
Castlelyons	Year	Apps	Score
Castlelyons	1999	3	1-19
Castlelyons	2000	3	2-05
Castlelyons	2001	5	2-17
Castlelyons	2002	2	0-04
Castlelyons	2003	2	0-14
Castlelyons	2004	2	0-01
Castlelyons	2005	2	0-03
Castlelyons	2006	3	0-13
Castlelyons	2007	4	1-29
Castlelyons	2008	4	3-29
Castlelyons	2009	5	1-12
Castlelyons	Total	35	10-136
Castlelyons	Year	Cork PIHC	
Castlelyons	Year	Apps	Score
Castlelyons	2010	5	0-16
Castlelyons	2011	2	0-06
Castlelyons	2012	4	0-05
Castlelyons	2013	4	0-04
Castlelyons	Total	15	0-31
Career total		58	14-186

=== Division ===
Team	Year	Cork SHC	
Team	Year	Apps	Score
Imokilly	1996	6	1-05
Imokilly	1997	4	1-03
Imokilly	1998	4	1-10
Career total		14	3-18

=== Inter-county ===
Team	Year	National League			Munster		All-Ireland		Total	
Team	Year	Division	Apps	Score	Apps	Score	Apps	Score	Apps	Score
Cork Minor	1995	—			2	2-00	2	0-02	4	2-02
Cork Minor	Total	—			2	2-00	2	0-02	4	2-02
Cork U21	1996	—			0	0-00	0	0-00	0	0-00
Cork U21	1997	—			3	1-05	2	0-00	5	1-05
Cork U21	1998	—			3	1-07	1	0-00	4	1-07
Cork U21	Total	—			6	2-12	3	0-00	9	2-12
Cork Junior	1996	—			3	0-06	2	0-01	5	0-07
Cork Junior	Total	—			3	0-06	2	0-01	5	0-07
Cork Intermediate	1997	—			3	0-03	3	0-02	6	0-05
Cork Intermediate	Total	—			3	0-03	3	0-02	6	0-05
Cork	1998	Division 1B	1	0-00	0	0-00	—		1	0-00
Cork	1999	Division 1B	6	0-04	2	0-03	2	0-03	10	0-10
Cork	2000	Division 1B	5	0-02	3	1-05	1	0-00	9	1-07
Cork	2001	Division 1B	3	0-03	1	0-00	—		4	0-03
Cork	2002	Division 1B	6	0-04	1	0-02	2	0-02	9	0-08
Cork	2003	Division 1B	3	1-03	2	0-01	3	1-03	8	2-07
Cork	2004	Division 1B	6	0-07	3	0-02	4	1-05	13	1-14
Cork	2005	Division 1B	4	1-05	1	0-00	3	0-03	8	1-08
Cork	2006	Division 1A	2	0-03	2	0-00	3	0-03	7	0-06
Cork	2007	Division 1A	4	0-01	1	0-00	5	0-02	10	0-03
Cork	2008	Division 1A	4	0-04	1	0-00	4	1-01	9	1-05
Cork	2009	Division 1	0	0-00	1	0-00	2	0-01	3	0-01
Cork	Total		44	2-36	18	1-13	29	3-23	91	6-72
Career total			44	2-36	32	5-34	39	3-28	115	10-98

== Honours ==
=== Team ===
St. Colman's College

- Dr. Harty Cup (1): 1996 (c)

Castlelyons

- Cork Intermediate Hurling Championship (1): 1998
- Cork Junior Hurling Championship (1): 1997

Imokilly

- Cork Senior Hurling Championship (2): 1997, 1998

Cork

- All-Ireland Senior Hurling Championship (3): 1999, 2004, 2005
- Munster Senior Hurling Championship (5): 1999, 2000, 2003, 2005, 2006
- National Hurling League (1): 1998
- All-Ireland Intermediate Hurling Championship (1): 1997
- Munster Intermediate Hurling Championship (1): 1997
- Munster Junior Hurling Championship (1): 1996
- All-Ireland Under-21 Hurling Championship (2): 1997, 1998
- Munster Under-21 Hurling Championship (3): 1996, 1997, 1998
- All-Ireland Minor Hurling Championship (1): 1995
- Munster Minor Hurling Championship (1): 1995

Munster

- Railway Cup (1): 2007
