= Blackwater Community School =

- Irish: Pobalscoil na hAbhann Móire

Location
- Ballyanchor Road, Lismore, County Waterford; P51 N472; Ireland
- Coordinates: 52.1350°N 7.9399°W

Information
- Former names: Lismore CBS; Presentation Convent, Lismore; St Anne’s Secondary School, Cappoquin
- Type: Community school
- Motto: Latin: Sapientia et Scientia (Wisdom and Knowledge)
- Denomination: Multidenominational
- Founded: September 2003
- Principal: Denis Ring
- Gender: Mixed
- Enrollment: 950 (2024)
- Nickname: BCS
- Website: www.blackwatercs.com

Blackwater Community School (Irish: Pobalscoil na hAbhann Móire) (BCS) is a co-educational, multi-denominational community school in Lismore, County Waterford, Ireland. The school offers Junior Certificate and Leaving Certificate programmes. It is the 146th public school in the county and the fourth largest school in the county by number of pupils. In 2020, BCS was ranked 367th in The Sunday Times 'Best Schools Guide Top 400'.

== History ==
Blackwater Community School is an amalgamation of three local schools: Lismore CBS, Presentation Convent, Lismore and St Anne’s Secondary School, Cappoquin. It was opened in September 2003 with a student population of 400 students.

The first phase of a large extension to the school, which commenced in 2021, was completed in 2022. Additional phases of development, including refurbishment of existing school buildings, were also undertaken. The new campus was officially opened on 19 September 2025 by Taoiseach Micheál Martin.

== Extra-curricular activities ==
Sports undertaken at the school include athletics, soccer, hurling, camogie, Gaelic football and Ladies' Gaelic football. In 2008, the boys' hurling team won the All-Ireland PPS Senior B Hurling Championship, while the girls' camogie team won the All-Ireland C Colleges trophy. The school's hurling team also won the Dean Ryan Cup in November 2011.

Pupils have also previously represented the school at the BT Young Scientist and Technology Exhibition.

== Notable alumni ==
- Jamie Barron (born 1993) - Waterford senior hurler
- Kieran Bennett (born 1994) - Waterford senior hurler
- Shane Bennett (born 1996) - Waterford senior hurler
- Stephen Bennett (born 1995) - Waterford senior hurler
- Iarlaith Daly (born 2000) - Waterford senior hurler
- Darragh Fives (born 1992) - Waterford senior hurler
- Shane Fives (born 1989) - Waterford senior hurler
- Mikey Kearney (born 1995) - Waterford senior hurler
- Jayson Molumby (born 1999) - Republic of Ireland football player
- Jack Prendergast (born 1998) - Waterford senior hurler
- Maurice Shanahan (born 1990) - Waterford senior hurler
