= 2009–10 Harty Cup =

2009–10 Dr Harty Cup
- Dates: September 2009 – 11 March 2010
- Champions: Ardscoil Rís (1st title); Seán O'Brien (captain)
- Runners-up: Thurles CBS; Denis Maher (captain)

The 2009–10 Harty Cup was the 90th staging of the Harty Cup since its establishment in hurling by the Munster Council of Gaelic Athletic Association in 1918.

Thurles CBS were the defending champions.

The final, which went to two replays, was played on 11 March 2010 at MacDonagh Park in Nenagh, between Ardscoil Rís and Thurles CBS, in what was their first ever meeting in the final. Ardscoil Rís won the match by 3–15 to 0–14 to claim their first ever Harty Cup title.

== Knockout stage ==
=== Final ===
28 February 2010 Final	Ardscoil Rís	1-12 - 1-12	Thurles CBS	MacDonagh Park
	D Hannon 0-7, K Downes 1-1, J Fitzgibbon 0-3, N Kennedy 0-1.	Report	M O'Brien 0-9, D Mager 1-1, P Raphy 0-2.

=== Final replay ===
6 March 2010 Final replay	Ardscoil Rís	2-21 - 4-15	Thurles CBS	MacDonagh Park
	D Hannon 1-5 (0-4f), J Fitzgibbon 0-8 (0-6f), C McInerney 1-0, S Dowling, N Kennedy, J Shanahan 0-2 each, M Ryan, K Downes 0-1 each.	Report	M O'Brien 0-10 (0-7f), D Maher 2-0 (1-0 pen), P Ralph 1-2 (1-0f), K Slattery 1-0, T Doyle 0-3.

=== Final second replay ===
11 March 2010 Final second replay	Ardscoil Rís	3-15 - 0-14	Thurles CBS	MacDonagh Park
	B O'Connor 1-2, M Ryan 1-1, N Kennedy 1-0, J Fitzgibbon (0-2f), D Hannon (0-3f), 0-3 each, J Shanahan , K Downes 0-2 each, S Dowling, A Breen 0-1 each.	Report	M O'Brien 0-5 (0-4f), A McCormack,P Ralph 0-3 each, P Looby, D Maher, T Doyle 0-1 each.
