= Donncha Ó Dúlaing =

Irish broadcaster (1933–2021)

Donncha Ó Dúlaing (15 March 1933 – 4 September 2021) was an Irish broadcaster who was known country-wide and among the Irish around the world for his cultural and traditional music programmes.

== Career ==
Ó Dúlaing was born in County Cork. His broadcasting career began when he joined Radio Éireann in 1964.

His Highways and Byways radio series on RTÉ Radio One became hugely popular as did his television series on RTÉ Television. He was the former head of features, RTÉ Radio.

He became universally known for his fundraising walks for charity in Ireland, the UK, France and Israel and among the Choctaw Indians in the USA, who had contributed to the victims of the famine in Ireland in the 1840s. His walks, sometimes up to 43 miles per day, have helped raise many hundreds of thousands in funds for charity since the 1980s.

Ó Dúlaing presented the hour-long programme Fáilte Isteach at 10 pm on Saturday evenings on RTÉ Radio 1 and had thousands of listeners among the Irish diaspora who would enter his 'Parlour of Dreams' where 'many dreams came true' on the programme. He celebrated 50 years in broadcasting in February 2014 and presented the last Fáilte Isteach on 25 April 2015.

The president of Ireland, Michael D. Higgins, presented a specially commissioned sculpture to him at Áras an Uachtaráin in Phoenix Park, Dublin in August 2014 in recognition of his contribution to Irish culture.

A 288-page illustrated memoir titled Donncha's World- the Roads, the Stories and the Wireless, co-authored with writer Declan Lyons and launched by his friend, the singer Daniel O'Donnell, in September 2014, tells the story of his life and career, his walks, his broadcasts and the national and internationally famous people he has interviewed and met including President Eamon de Valera, Pope John Paul II, Edna O'Brien, Rosie Hackett, Mick Jagger, Sir Edmund Hillary and Gene Kelly.

Ó Dúlaing and his wife Vera (née Galvin) lived in Dublin near RTÉ Headquarters in Donnybrook.

== Death ==
Ó Dúlaing died on 4 September 2021, aged 88.

== Sources ==
- Autobiography: Walking and talking, Blackwater Press 1998 ISBN 0-86121-955-4
