= Iarlaith Daly =

Irish hurler

Personal information
- Native name: Iarlaith Ó Dálaigh (Irish)
- Born: 2000 (age 25–26) Lismore, County Waterford, Ireland
- Occupation: Actuary
- Height: 6 ft 0 in (183 cm)

Sport
- Sport: Hurling
- Position: Centre back
Club
- Years: Club
- Lismore
Club titles
- Waterford titles: 0
Inter-county*
Years	County	Apps (scores)
2019-present	Waterford	1 (0-01)
Inter-county titles
- Munster titles: 0
- All-Irelands: 0
- NHL: 0
- All Stars: 0
- *Inter County team apps and scores correct as of 22:24, 28 November 2020.

Iarlaith Daly (born 2000) is an Irish hurler who plays for Waterford Senior Championship club Lismore and at inter-county level with the Waterford senior hurling team. He usually lines out as a Centre back

== Playing career ==
=== Waterford ===
Daly first played for Waterford at minor level during the 2017 Munster Minor Championship, lining out in three successive defeats during the short-lived campaign. After one season in the minor grade, Daly was drafted onto the Waterford under-21/under-20 team. His two seasons in these grades ended with first-round Munster Championship defeats in both 2018 and 2019.

Daly was added to the Waterford senior hurling team in advance of the 2020 season. He made his first appearance for the team on 29 December 2019 when he lined out at right wing-back in a 1-17 to 1–13 defeat by Cork in the pre-season Munster League. Daly was retained on the training panel for the subsequent National League and was selected on the starting fifteen for Waterford's first two games of the campaign. Daly made his championship debut on 28 November 2020 when he was introduced as a 61st-minute substitute for Kevin Moran in a 2–27 to 2–23 defeat of Kilkenny in the All-Ireland semi-final.

== Career statistics ==
As of match played 28 November 2020.

Team	Year	National League			Munster		All-Ireland		Total	
Team	Year	Division	Apps	Score	Apps	Score	Apps	Score	Apps	Score
Waterford	2020	Division 1A	2	0-02	0	0-00	1	0-01	3	0-03
Career total			2	0-02	0	0-00	1	0-01	3	0-03
