= Shane Bennett (hurler) =

Irish hurler

Personal information
- Native name: Seán Mac Beinéid (Irish)
- Born: 5 December 1996 (age 29) Ballysaggart, County Waterford, Ireland
- Occupation: Electrician
- Height: 6 ft 0 in (183 cm)

Sport
- Sport: Hurling
- Position: Centre-forward
Club
- Years: Club
- Ballysaggart
Club titles
- Waterford titles: 0
Inter-county*
Years	County	Apps (scores)
2015-	Waterford	3 (1-2)
Inter-county titles
- Munster titles: 0
- All-Irelands: 0
- NHL: 0
- All Stars: 0
- *Inter County team apps and scores correct as of 18:48, 27 July 2015.

Shane Bennett (born 5 December 1996) is an Irish hurler who plays as a centre-forward for the Waterford senior team.

== Early life and career ==
Born in Ballysaggart, County Waterford, Bennett first played competitive hurling during his schooling at Blackwater Community School. He arrived on the inter-county scene at the age of fifteen when he first linked up with the Waterford minor team before later joining the under-21 side. Bennett played wing back in 2013 as Waterford won the All Ireland minor title for the first time since 1948. Three years later, he was part of the same team that captured the county's second All Ireland U-21 title, again beating Galway. He made his senior debut during the 2015 league. Bennett has since become a regular member of the starting fifteen.

At club level, Bennett is a one-time Munster medallist in the junior grade with Ballysaggart. In addition to this, he has also won one championship medal in the same grade.

== Personal life ==
His brothers, Kieran and Stephen, also plays with Waterford.

== Honours ==
=== Player ===
Ballysaggart

- Waterford Intermediate Hurling Championship (1): 2019
- Munster Junior Club Hurling Championship (1): 2013
- Waterford Junior Hurling Championship (1): 2013

Waterford

- All-Ireland Minor Hurling Championship (1): 2013
- Munster Under-21 Hurling Championship (1): 2016
