= Ballysaggart, County Waterford =

Village in County Waterford, Ireland

Ballysaggart
- Village
- Location in Ireland
- Coordinates: 52.18435°N 8.01182°W
- Country: Ireland
- Province: Munster
- County: Waterford
- Elevation: 225 m (738 ft)
- Time zone: UTC+0 (WET)
  - Summer (DST): UTC-1 (IST (WEST))

Ballysaggart is a village in County Waterford, Ireland.

== Amenities ==
It has a Catholic church, public house, shop, garage and petrol filling station as well as a GAA playing field and civic amenity site.

== Access ==
The village is situated approximately 8 kilometres from Lismore and 25 kilometres from Fermoy. Some maps may refer to the area as Logleagh.

== Climate ==
Ballysaggart, in County Waterford, has a temperate oceanic climate, resulting in mild temperatures and rainfall distributed throughout the year. The average annual temperature is around 10 °C, with the coldest month being January (3–4 °C) and the warmest months being July and August (18–19 °C). Rainfall occurs year-round, increasing during the winter, while winds are moderate to occasionally strong. The climate is generally humid and cloudy for most of the year.

== See also ==
- Ballysaggart GAA
