= Castlelyons GAA =

Gaelic games club in County Cork, Ireland

Castlelyons
- Caisleán Uí Liatháin
- Founded: 1948
- County: Cork
- Colours
- Grounds: Castlelyons GAA Grounds
- Coordinates: 52°05′17.73″N 8°13′55.01″W

Playing kits
Standard colours

Castlelyons GAA is a Gaelic Athletic Association club in Castlelyons, County Cork, Ireland. The club is affiliated to the East Cork Board and is primarily concerned with the game of hurling, but also fields teams in Gaelic football.

== History ==
Located in the village of Castlelyons, about 6 miles from Fermoy, Castlelyons GAA Club was founded in 1948. The club has spent most of its existence operating in the junior grade, winning three East Cork JAHC titles. The last of these divisional titles was later converted into a Cork JAHC title, after a 2-09 to 1-11 defeat of Courcey Rovers in the final.

Castlelyons secured a second successive promotion and senior status for the first time in their history, after winning the Cork IHC in 1998 with a three-point defeat of Killeagh. The new century brought the club's first ever county title in Gaelic football when, in 2014, Castlelyons beat Kilmeen to win the Cork JBFC title.

After losing three Cork PIHC finals between 2013 and 2021, Castlelyons returned to senior level once again after claiming the PIHC title in 2023 with a 0-19 to 0-17 win over Kilworth in the final.

== Honours ==
- Cork Premier Intermediate Hurling Championship (1): 2023
- Cork Intermediate Hurling Championship (1): 1998
- Cork Junior A Hurling Championship (1): 1997
- East Cork Junior A Hurling Championship (3): 1955, 1993, 1997
- Cork Junior B Hurling Championship (1): 1991
- Cork Junior B Football Championship (2): 1989, 2014
- Cork Junior C Football Championship (1): 2025
- East Cork Junior B Football Championship (2): 1968, 2005
- East Cork Junior B Hurling Championship (4): 1953, 1965, 1972, 1986
- Cork Under-21 B Hurling Championship (1): 2010
- Cork Premier 2 Minor Hurling Championship (1): 2010

== Notable players ==
- Timmy McCarthy: All-Ireland SHC-winner (1999, 2004, 2005)
- Niall O'Leary: Munster SHC-winner (2025)
- Colm Spillane: Munster SHC-winner (2017, 2018)
