= C.B.S. Charleville =

Location
- Charleville, Cork, Ireland; 52.3546°N 8.6792°W

Information
- Established: 1866
- Enrollment: 302 (2024)
- Website: https://charlevillecbs.com/

C.B.S. Charleville (Christian Brothers School, Charleville) is a secondary school in Charleville, County Cork, Ireland. Initially founded in the 1860s, the school's original 19th-century building was closed when the school moved to a new premises in 1972. The school, which had approximately 300 pupils in 2024, operates under the trusteeship of the Edmund Rice Schools Trust.

== History ==
Following an initial public meeting in February 1864, the Congregation of Christian Brothers opened the school in Charleville in April 1866 with an initial enrollment of 200 pupils. Among the school's pupils in the 19th century was Éamon de Valera, who attended the school from 1896 to 1898 when he obtained a scholarship to Blackrock College in Dublin. The school's original 19th-century building, which was remodelled in the 1920s, was closed when the school moved to a new premises in 1972. C.B.S. Charleville marked its 160th anniversary in 2016.

The school has historically been associated with hurling, fielding teams in the Rice Cup, the Dean Ryan Cup and reaching the final of the Dr Harty Cup in 1938 and again in the 2011 competition.

== Notable alumni ==
- Éamon de Valera - politician and statesman. He received his secondary education in Charleville from 1896 to 1898. He said in a statement in 1921 that "I regretted every moment even when I was forced to watch my youth fall away".
- Rory Kiely - Cathaoirleach of Seanad Éireann (2002)
- Daniel Mannix - Archbishop of Melbourne
- Michael Mortell - president of University College Cork
- Donncha Ó Dúlaing - broadcaster
- Patrick Quinlan - academic and politician
