= 2002 Waterford Senior Hurling Championship =

Annual hurling competition season

- Dates: 26 April 2002 – 10 November 2002
- Teams: 12
- Champions: Mount Sion (32nd title); John Cleere (captain); Jim Greene (manager)
- Runners-up: Ballygunner; Billy O'Sullivan (captain); Gordon Ryan (manager)

Tournament statistics
- Matches played: 24
- Top scorer(s): James Cuddihy (2–25)

The 2002 Waterford Senior Hurling Championship was the 102nd staging of the Waterford Senior Hurling Championship since its establishment by the Waterford County Board in 1897. The championship began on 26 April 2002 and ended on 10 November 2002.

Ballygunner were the defending champions.

On 6 October 2002, Mount Sion won the championship after a 1–19 to 2–14 defeat of Ballygunner in the final at Walsh Park. It was their 32nd championship title overall and their first title since 2000.

Ballyduff Lower's James Cuddihy was the championship's top scorer with 2–25.

== Results ==
=== First round ===
26 April 2002 First round	Mount Sion	4–21 – 2–05	Passage	Walsh Park, Waterford
	S Ryan 3–0, E Kelly 1–6, K McGrath 0–8, M White 0–3, T Browne 0–1, A Kirwan 0–1, M O'Regan 0–1, M Frisby 0–1.		P Fitzgerald 1–1, I Connors 1–0, B Walsh 0–3, J Hanrahan 0–1.	Referee: T O'Byrne (Erin's Own)

27 April 2002 First round	Portlaw	3–03 – 2–07	Roanmore	Walsh Park, Waterford
	J Laffan 1–0, H Maher 1–0, J Hartley 1–0, F Kelly 0–2, G O'Brien 0–1.		A Lannon 1–3, D Byrne 1–0, D Murphy 0–3, C O'Neill 0–1.	Referee: S Flynn (Fenor)

27 April 2002 First round	Fourmilewater	0–10 – 0–10	De La Salle	Fraher Field, Dungarvan
	S Walsh 0–4, D Spellman 0–3, L Walsh 0–1, T Flynn 0–1, P Walsh 0–1.		J Mullane 0–4, B Phelan 0–4, D McGrath 0–1, A Kelly 0–1.	Referee: JM Kelly (Shamrocks)

28 April 2002 First round	Lismore	3–13 – 1–10	Stradbally	Fraher Field, Dungarvan
	D Bennett 1–5, J Heneghan 1–3, S Daly 1–0, D Shanahan 0–2, B Prendergast 0–2, D Howard 0–1.		T Curran 0–8, D Doyle 1–0, N Curran 0–1, S Cunningham 0–1.	Referee: P Walsh (Fourmilewater)

2 May 2002 First round	Ballyduff Upper	1–12 – 2–08	Ballyduff Lower	Fraher Field, Dungarvan
	B Hannon 0–5, P Prendergast 0–4, T Molumphy 1–0, B Kearney 0–2, S Molumphy 0–1.		J Kennedy 1–1, N Power 0–4, J Cuddihy 1–0, D van Veen 0–1, T Cooper 0–1, C Kenney 0–1.	Referee: T O'Sullivan (Cappoquin)

4 May 2002 First round	Ballygunner	0–13 – 0–07	Tallow	Fraher Field, Dungarvan
	P Flynn 0–4, A Moloney 0–2, B O'Sullivan 0–2, M Mahony 0–2, D O'Sullivan 0–1, P Foley 0–1, A Hearne 0–1.		P Kearney 0–4, J Murray 0–3.	Referee: P Moore (Abbeyside)

31 May 2002 First round replay	Fourmilewater	1–08 – 1–13	De La Salle	St. Declan's Park, Ardmore
	D Spellman 1–2, S Walsh 0–3, M Guiry 0–2, B Wall 0–1.		B Phelan 0–4, W Power 1–0, A Kelly 0–3, J Mullane 0–3, D McGrath 0–2, M Barden 0–1.	Referee: JM Kelly (Shamrocks)

=== Second round ===
8 June 2002 Second round	Lismore	1–18 – 2–06	Roanmore	Fraher Field, Dungarvan
	D Bennett 0–9, W Cunningham 1–2, D Shanahan 0–3, S Kearney 0–1, S Prendergast 0–1, P Prendergast 0–1, K O'Gorman 0–1.		A Lannon 1–2, T Dunphy 1–1, N Crowley 0–2, C Fanning 0–1.	Referee: S Flynn (Fenor)

9 June 2002 Second round	Mount Sion	3–15 – 1–10	De La Salle	Walsh Park, Waterford
	M White 1–6, B Browne 2–1, E Kelly 0–3, S Ryan 0–2, N Mackey 0–2, M Frisby 0–1.		J Mullane 0–5, S Brenner 1–0, L Hayes 0–2, A Kelly 0–1, B Phelan 0–1, L Lawlor 0–1.	Referee: JM Kelly (Shamrocks)

9 June 2002 Second round	Ballygunner	6–12 – 1–08	Ballyduff Upper	Fraher Field, Dungarvan
	P Flynn 2–4, P Foley 2–2, B O'Sullivan 2–2, M Mahoney 0–1, D O'Sullivan 0–1, A Moloney 0–1, G Cullinan 0–1.		T Molumphy 1–1, B Hannon 0–4, M Molumphy 0–2, J Twomey 0–1.	Referee: P Moore (Abbeyside)

14 July 2002 Second round	Tallow	2–12 – 3–09	Stradbally	Fraher Field, Dungarvan
	P Kearney 1–8, P O'Brien 1–1, C Slattery 0–1, D O'Brien 0–1, SF McCarthy 0–1.		N Curran 1–3, C Coffey 1–0, D Doyle 1–0, M Walsh 0–3, T Curran 0–1, J Hearn 0–1, G Power 0–1.	Referee: P Moore (Abbeyside)

17 August 2002 Second round	Portlaw	1–08 – 0–08	Fourmilewater	Fraher Field, Dungarvan
	F Kelly 1–7, H Maher 0–1.		Joe Walsh 0–5, S Walsh 0–2, D Spellman 0–1.	Referee: T O'Sullivan (Cappoquin)

17 August 2002 Second round	Passage	1–12 – 2–17	Ballyduff Lower	Walsh Park, Waterford
	A Brett 0–8, J Hanrahan 1–0, B Walsh 0–2, S Cullinane 0–1, I Connors 0–1.		J Cuddihy 0–8, S Larkin 2–1, J Kennedy 0–2, T Cooper 0–2, J O'Leary 0–2, D Van Veen 0–1, N Power 0–1.	Referee: M Wadding (Roanmore)

18 August 2002 Second round replay	Tallow	2–16 – 1–12	Stradbally	Fraher Field, Dungarvan
	P O'Brien 1–5, P Kearney 0–7, B Henley 0–2, B Sheehan 0–1, M Geary 0–1.		J Coffey 1–2, T Curran 0–5, M Walsh 0–3, N Curran 0–2.	Referee: P Walsh (Fourmilewater)

=== Relegation play-off ===
15 September 2002 Round 1	Stradbally	1–17 – 1–08	Passage	Fraher Field, Dungarvan
	M Walsh 1–4, T Curran 0–7, S Cunningham 0–3, G Power 0–1, J Coffey 0–1, J Hearne 0–1.		B Walsh 1–3, A Brett 0–4, P Lavey 0–1.	Referee: J Hunt (Clonea)

10 November 2002 Round 2	Fourmilewater	2–10 – 2–07	Passage	Fraher Field, Dungarvan
	D Spellman 1–3, L Lawlor 1–0, M Guiry 0–3, B Wall 0–2, S Walsh 0–1, T Flynn 0–1.		J Hanrahan 1–1, A Fitzgerald 1–0, A Brett 0–3, B Walsh 0–3.	Referee: JM Kelly (Shamrocks)

=== Losers' group ===
24 August 2002 Round 1	De La Salle	1–09 – 2–12	Ballyduff Lower	Walsh Park, Waterford
	M Barden 1–1, B Phelan 0–4, J Mullane 0–2, F O'Brien 0–1, I Flynn 0–1.		J Cuddihy 0–8, J Kennedy 0–4, S Larkin 1–0, G Harris 1–0.	Referee: M Wadding (Roanmore)

25 August 2002 Round 1	Roanmore	3–10 – 1–14	Tallow	Fraher Field, Dungarvan
	A Lannon 1–6, D Byrne 1–1, P Murphy 1–0, L O'Neill 0–2, M Creed 0–1.		M O'Brien 1–1, P Kearney 0–3, J Murray 0–3, P Murray 0–3, P O'Brien 0–2, B Sheehan 0–1, JP Grey 0–1.	Referee: J Hunt (Clonea)

25 August 2002 Round 1	Portlaw	3–05 – 0–17	Ballyduff Upper	Fraher Field, Dungarvan
	H Maher 2–0, P Coffey 1–0, A Kirwan 0–3, K Reade 0–1, D Long 0–1.		B Hannon 0–4, S Molumphy 0–4, L Feeney 0–2, L McNamara 0–2, S Twomey 0–2, P Prendergast 0–1, M Molumphy 0–1, D Hannon 0–1.	Referee: T O'Byrne (Erin's Own)

1 September 2002 Round 2	Ballyduff Lower	1–12 – 0–13	Roanmore	Walsh Park, Waterford
	S Larkin 0–4, P Murphy 1–0, J Cuddihy 0–3, J Kennedy 0–2, V Van Veen 0–1, J O'Leary 0–1, N Power 0–1.		A Lannon 0–7, D Byrne 0–3, L O'Neill 0–1, D Murphy 0–1, P Tobin 0–1.	Referee: JM Kelly (Shamrocks)

=== Quarter-final ===
7 September 2002 Quarter-final	Ballyduff Upper	2–14 – 2–10	Ballyduff Lower	Fraher Field, Dungarvan
	M Molumphy 2–2, B Hannon 0–7, L McNamara 0–2, S Molumphy 0–2, J Twomey 0–1.		S Cuddihy 1–6, J Kennedy 1–0, J O'Leary 0–2, S Larkin 0–2.	Referee: P Walsh (Fourmilewater)

=== Semi-finals ===
22 September 2002 Semi-final	Ballygunner	2–13 – 2–12	Lismore	Fraher Field, Dungarvan
	B O'Sullivan 2–1, P Flynn 0–4, A Moloney 0–2, P Foley 0–2, P Power 0–2, A Hearne 0–1, T Fives 0–1.		D Shanahan 1–4, D Bennett 0–7, D Howard 1–0, B Prendergast 0–1.	Referee: P Moore (Abbeyside)

22 September 2002 Semi-final	Mount Sion	4–12 – 2–12	Ballyduff Upper	Fraher Field, Dungarvan
	K McGrath 0–7, B Browne 2–0, J Meaney 1–1, S Ryan 1–0, E Kelly 0–2, M White 0–1, M Frisby 0–1.		M Molumphy 2–0, P Prendergast 0–3, J Twomey 0–3, B Hannon 0–3, T Feeney 0–2, L McNamara 0–1.	Referee: J Hunt (Clonea)

=== Final ===
6 October 2002 Final	Mount Sion	1–19 – 2–14	Ballygunner	Walsh Park, Waterford
	K McGrath (0–11, eight frees), E Kelly (0–6); E McGrath (1–0); T Browne (0–1), S Ryan (0–1).		P Flynn (1–6, 1–4 from frees); A Ahearne (0–4), A Moloney (1–0); T Fives (0–1), B O'Sullivan (0–1), P Power (0–1), G Cullinane (0–1).

== Championship statistics ==
=== Top scorers ===
Top scorers overall

Rank	Player	Club	Tally	Total	Matches	Average
1	James Cuddihy	Ballyduff Lower	2–25	31	5	6.20
2	Paul Flynn	Ballygunner	3–18	27	4	6.75
2	Anton Lannon	Roanmore	3–18	27	4	6.75
3	Ken McGrath	Mount Sion	0–26	26	3	8.66
4	Paul Kearney	Tallow	1–22	25	4	6.25
5	Dave Bennett	Lismore	1–21	24	3	8.00
6	Brendan Hannon	Ballyduff Upper	0–23	23	5	4.60
7	Tom Curran	Stradbally	0–21	21	4	5.25
8	Eoin Kelly	Mount Sion	1–17	20	4	5.00
9	Billy O'Sullivan	Ballygunner	4–06	18	4	4.50

Top scorers in a single game

Rank	Player	Club	Tally	Total	Opposition
1	Paul Kearney	Tallow	1–08	11	Stradbally
1	Ken McGrath	Mount Sion	0–11	11	Ballygunner
2	Paul Flynn	Ballygunner	2-04	10	Ballyduff Upper
2	Freddie Kelly	Portlaw	1–07	10	Fourmilewater
3	Seán Ryan	Mount Sion	3–00	9	Passage
3	Eoin Kelly	Mount Sion	1–06	9	Passage
3	Michael White	Mount Sion	1–06	9	De La Salle
3	Anton Lannon	Roanmore	1–06	9	Tallow
3	James Cuddihy	Ballyduff Lower	1–06	9	Ballyduff Upper
3	Paul Flynn	Ballygunner	1–06	9	Mount Sion
3	Dave Bennett	Lismore	0–09	9	Roanmore
