= Darragh O'Sullivan =

Irish hurling manager and former player

Personal information
- Native name: Darragh Ó Súilleabháin (Irish)
- Born: 1975 (age 50–51) Ballygunner, County Waterford, Ireland
- Occupation: Accountant

Sport
- Sport: Hurling
- Position: Left corner-forward
Club
- Years: Club
- 1992-2002: Ballygunner
Club titles
- Waterford titles: 6
- Munster titles: 1
Club management
- Years: Club
- 2019-: Ballygunner
	6	1	0

Darragh O'Sullivan (born 1975) is an Irish hurling manager and former player. He is the current manager of the Ballygunner team, having also played for the club. O'Sullivan also lined out at various levels with Waterford.

== Playing career ==
O'Sullivan first played hurling at juvenile and underage levels with Ballygunner, winning a Waterford MHC medal in 1992. He was also a member of the extended panel of the club's senior team that also claimed the Waterford SHC title that year. O'Sullivan won six Waterford SHC titles in total between 1992 and 2001. He was also part of Ballygunner's inaugural Munster Club SHC-winning team in 2001.

O'Sullivan's inter-county career with Waterford began at minor level. He was part of the Waterford team beaten by Galway in the 1992 All-Ireland minor final. O'Sullivan later progressed to under-21 level and made a number of appearances for the senior team in challenge games.

== Coaching career ==
O'Sullivan succeeded Fergal Hartley as Ballygunner's senior team manager in 2019. During his tenure, he guided the club to six successive Waterford SHC titles. His side also became the first club to win three successive Munster Club SHC titles. O'Sullivan's time in charge also saw Ballygunner beat Ballyhale Shamrocks in the 2022 All-Ireland club final.

== Personal life ==
His brothers, Billy and Shane O'Sullivan, as well as his nephews, Philip, Kevin, Pauric Mahony and Patrick Fitzgerald, also played with Ballygunner and the Waterford senior team.

== Honours ==
=== Player ===
Ballygunner

- Munster Senior Club Hurling Championship: 2001
- Waterford Senior Hurling Championship: 1992, 1995, 1996, 1997, 1999, 2001

Waterford

- Munster Minor Hurling Championship: 1992

=== Management ===
Ballygunner

- All-Ireland Senior Club Hurling Championship: 2022
- Munster Senior Club Hurling Championship: 2021, 2022, 2023
- Waterford Senior Hurling Championship: 2019, 2020, 2021, 2022, 2023, 2024
