= 2003 Waterford Senior Hurling Championship =

Annual hurling competition season

- Dates: 15 August 2003 – 9 November 2003
- Teams: 12
- Sponsor: Top Oil
- Champions: Mount Sion (33rd title); Tony Browne (captain); Jim Greene (manager)
- Runners-up: Ballygunner; Tom Fives (captain); Gordon Ryan (manager)
- Relegated: Portlaw

Tournament statistics
- Matches played: 24
- Top scorer(s): Seán Daly (6–20)

The 2003 Waterford Senior Hurling Championship was the 103rd staging of the Waterford Senior Hurling Championship since its establishment by the Waterford County Board in 1897. The championship began on 15 August 2003 and ended on 9 November 2003.

Mount Sion were the defending champions.

On 9 November 2003, Mount Sion won the championship after a 1–14 to 1–10 defeat of Ballygunner in a final replay at Walsh Park. It was their 33rd championship title overall and their second title in succession.

Lismore's Seán Daly was the championship's top scorer with 6–20.

== Team changes ==
=== To Championship ===
Promoted from the Waterford Intermediate Hurling Championship

- Ardmore

=== From Championship ===
Relegated to the Waterford Intermediate Hurling Championship

- Passage

== Results ==
=== First round ===
15 August 2003 First round	Mount Sion	0–13 – 1–09	Ardmore	Cappoquin
	M White 0–5, K McGrath 0–3, S Ryan 0–2, E McGrath 0–1, E Kelly 0–1, I Power 0–1.		S Prendergast 1–4, B Harty 0–3, M O'Connor 0–1, J Hennessy 0–1.	Referee: T O'Sullivan (Cappoquin)

16 August 2003 First round	Fourmilewater	3–12 – 3–10	Ballyduff Lower	Páirc Naomh Bríd, Lemybrien
	S Walsh 1–6, D Spellman 1–2, T Flynn 1–0, R Rice 0–1, A O'Gorman 0–1, A Lawlor 0–1, G Walsh 0–1.		J Kennedy 1–3, P Fitzgerald 1–2, J O'Leary 1–0, J Cuddihy 0–2, R Barron 0–1, C Kenny 0–1, S Larkin 0–1.	Referee: T O'Byrne (Erin's Own)

16 August 2003 First round	Lismore	3–15 – 1–07	Portlaw	Páirc Chuileagáin/Na hEmmetigh, Colligan
	S Daly 2–5, J Heneghan 1–1, D Shanahan 0–3, D Bennett 0–2, W Cunningham 0–1, J Shanahan 0–1, B Prendergast 0–1, P Prendergast 0–1.		F Kelly 1–2, J Hartley 0–3, M Power 0–2.	Referee: P Walsh (Fourmilewater)

17 August 2003 First round	De La Salle	2–09 – 1–11	Tallow	Cappoquin
	J Mullane 1–3, R Murphy 1–3, L Hayes 0–2, B Phelan 0–1.		P Kearney 0–5, B Henley 1–0, S Slattery 0–2, M Geary 0–2, J Murray 0–1.	Referee: T O'Byrne (Erin's Own)

17 August 2003 First round	Ballygunner	0–16 – 0–05	Roanmore	Walsh Park, Waterford
	F Flynn 0–3, S O'Sullivan 0–3, A Moloney 0–2, W Hutchinson 0–2, P Foley 0–2, G O'Connor 0–2, B O'Sullivan 0–1, M O'Mahoney 0–1.		P Murphy 0–1, S Murphy 0–1, T Dunphy 0–1, S Flynn 0–1, D Murphy 0–1.	Referee: JM Kelly (Shamrocks)

17 August 2003 First round	Ballyduff Upper	1–16 – 1–09	Stradbally	St. Declan's Park, Ardmore
	B Hannon 0–6, B Kearney 1–1, J Twomey 1–1, Tom Feeney 0–2, S Molumphy 0–2, T Molumphy 0–1.		G Power 1–0, M Walsh 0–3, S Cunningham 0–2, N Curran 0–2, T Curran 0–1, K Coffey 0–1.	Referee: S Flynn (Fenor)

=== Second round ===
30 August 2003 Second round	Ballyduff Lower	2–11 – 1–14	Tallow	Stradbally
	J Cuddihy 1–6, R Barron 1–0,		P Kearney 0–6, P O'Brien 1–1, J Murray 0–3, M Geary 0–1, R Henley 0–1, S Slattery 0–1, C Geary 0–1.	Referee: T O'Sullivan (Cappoquin)

31 August 2003 Second round	Ballygunner	2–15 – 1–07	De La Salle	Walsh Park, Waterford
	P Flynn 2–4, P Foley 0–4, S O'Sullivan 0–3, A Moloney 0–1, D O'Sullivan 0–1, M Mahoney 0–1, G O'Connor 0–1.		J Mullane 1–5, B Phelan 0–1, R Murphy 0–1.	Referee: P Moore (Abbeyside)

31 August 2003 Second round	Mount Sion	2–14 – 2–13	Lismore	Páirc Naomh Bríd, Lemybrien
	M White 0–7, S Ryan 1–1, B Browne 1–0, E Kelly 0–3, R McGrath 0–1, M Frisby 0–1, B Greene 0–1.		S Daly 2–5, D Bennett 0–6, D Shanahan 0–1, D Heneghan 0–1.	Referee: JM Kelly (Shamrocks)

6 September 2003 Second round	Stradbally	1–13 – 0–12	Portlaw	Kill
	T Curran 0–8, N Curran 1–2, G Power 0–2, T Costelloe 0–1.		F Kelly 0–5, J Hartley 0–3, M Power 0–2, E Rockett 0–1, B Laffan 0–1.	Referee: T O'Byrne (Erin's Own)

7 September 2003 Second round	Fourmilewater	0–20 – 1–08	Ballyduff Upper	Cappoquin
	D Spellman 0–4, S Walsh 0–3, B Wall 0–3, D Ryan 0–2, T Flynn 0–2, G Walsh 0–2, R Rice 0–1, L Walsh 0–1, M Walsh 0–1, L Lawlor 0–1.		T Molumphy 1–0, P Prendergast 0–3, B Hannon 0–2, J Twomey 0–1, B Kearney 0–1, A Martin 0–1.	Referee: M Wadding (Roanmore)

7 September 2003 Second round replay	Tallow	1–13 – 0–08	Ballyduff Lower	Stradbally
	P Kearney 0–6, P O'Brien 1–2, J Murray 0–2, W Murphy 0–1, S Slattery 0–1, R Henley 0–1.		J Cuddihy 0–6, J O'Leary 0–1, P Matthews 0–1.	Referee: P Moore (Abbeyside)

7 September 2003 Second round	Roanmore	0–08 – 0–05	Ardmore	Cappoquin
	A Brett 0–5, T Dunphy 0–1, P Murphy 0–1, D Murphy 0–1.		S Prendergast 0–5.	Referee: S Flynn (Fenor)

=== Relegation play-offs ===
4 October 2003 Round 1	Ardmore	2–11 – 1–09	Ballyduff Lower	Fraher Field, Dungarvan
	S Prendergast 0–8, J Hennessy 1–0, P Conway 1–0, W Hennessy 0–2, A O'Donnell 0–1.		J Cuddihy 1–5, P Fitzgerald 0–2, D Van Veen 0–1, C Kenny 0–1.	Referee: P Moore (Abbeyside)

18 October 2003 Round 2	Ballyduff Lower	1–17 – 1–09	Portlaw	Walsh Park, Waterford
	J Cuddihy 0–7, R Barron 0–5, N Power 1–0, D Van Deen 0–2, S Larkin 0–1, P Fitzgerald 0–1, C Kenny 0–1.		F Kelly 1–5, B Laffan 0–1, J Hartley 0–1, E Galvin 0–1, M Power 0–1.	Referee: J Kelly (Shamrocks)

=== Losers' group ===
12 September 2003 Round 1	Stradbally	2–17 – 1–13	Ballyduff Upper	Cappoquin
	M Walsh 1–2, T Curran 0–5, G Power 1–1, S Cunningham 0–4, N Curran 0–3, J Hearne 0–1, T Costelloe 0–1.		B Hannon 0–5, P Prendergast 0–4, T Molumphy 1–0, J Twomey 0–2, T Feeney 0–1, S Cunningham 0–1.	Referee: P Walsh (Fourmilewater)

13 September 2003 Round 1	De La Salle	1–19 – 1–13	Tallow	Stradbally
	J Mullane 1–9, J Quirke 0–6, D McGrath 0–2, B Phelan 0–1, T Kearney 0–1.		P Kearney 0–5, W Henley 1–0, J Murray 0–2, P O'Brien 0–1, W Sheehan 0–1, R Henley 0–1, J Doyle 0–1, C Geary 0–1, S Slattery 0–1.

13 September 2003 Round 1	Lismore	3–16 – 0–10	Roanmore	Páirc Naomh Bríd, Lemybrien
	S Daly 1–3, D Bennett 0–6, J Heneghan 1–2, J Shanahan 1–1, D Shanahan 0–3, W Cunningham 0–1.		A Brett 0–6, T Dunphy 0–3, D Murphy 0–1.	Referee: JM Kelly (Shamrocks)

27 September 2003 Round 2	Lismore	2–22 – 0–08	Stradbally	Cappoquin
	J Heneghan 1–4, D Bennett 0–7, S Daly 1–3, D Shanahan 0–6, W Cunningham 0–1, P Daly 0–1.		T Curran 0–5, J Hearne 0–1, S Cunningham 0–1, N Curran 0–1.	Referee: P Moore (Abbeyside)

=== Quarter-final ===
5 October 2003 Quarter-final	Lismore	2–17 – 1–12	De La Salle	Fraher Field, Dungarvan
	D Bennett 1–7, J Heneghan 1–2, S Daly 0–4, D Shanahan 0–2, J Shanahan 0–1, B Prendergast 0–1.		J Mullane 0–7, P Nevin 1–1, J Quirke 0–2, D McGrath 0–2.	Referee: J Hunt (Clonea)

=== Semi-finals ===
19 October 2003 Semi-final	Ballygunner	3–11 – 0–10	Fourmilewater	Fraher Field, Dungarvan
	P Foley 1–2, S O'Sullivan 1–2, P Flynn 0–5, F Flynn 1–0, F Hartley 0–1, B O'Sullivan 0–1.		P Walsh 0–3, D Spellman 0–2, S Walsh 0–2, T Flynn 0–2, A O'Gorman 0–1.	Referee: M Wadding (Roanmore)

19 October 2003 Semi-final	Mount Sion	4–15 – 2–08	Lismore	Fraher Field, Dungarvan
	B Browne 2–3, E Kelly 0–7, D Kelly 1–1, S Ryan 1–0, K McGrath 0–2, E McGrath 0–1, M White 0–1.		D Shanahan 1–4, E Bennett 1–0, J Heneghan 0–2, W Cunningham 0–1, J Shanahan 0–1.	Referee: P Moore

=== Final ===
2 November 2003 Final	Mount Sion	1–14 – 2–11	Ballygunner	Walsh Park, Waterford
	E Kelly 0–8, K McGrath 1–3, M White 0–1, S Ryan 0–1, E McGrath 0–1.		P Flynn 2–6, S O'Sullivan 0–2, B O'Sullivan 0–1, W Hutchinson 0–1, S Frampton 0–1.

8 November 2003 Final replay	Mount Sion	1–14 – 1–10	Ballygunner	Walsh Park, Waterford
	E McGrath 1–1, E Kelly 0–4 (3f), K McGrath 0–4, S Ryan 0–2, B Browne, M White, M Frisby 0–1 each.	Report	P Flynn 0–6 (2f, 2 x '65'), S O'Sullivan 1–0, P Foley 0–2, A Moloney, R Whitty (f) 0–1 each).

== Championship statistics ==
=== Top scorers ===
Top scorers overall

Rank	Player	Club	Tally	Total	Matches	Average
1	Seán Daly	Lismore	6–20	38	6	6.33
2	Paul Flynn	Ballygunner	4–21	33	5	6.60
2	John Mullane	De La Salle	3–24	33	4	8.25
3	James Cuddihy	Ballyduff Lower	2–26	32	5	6.40
4	Dave Bennett	Lismore	1–28	31	6	5.16
5	John Heneghan	Lismore	4–11	23	6	3.83
5	Eoin Kelly	Mount Sion	0–23	23	5	4.60
6	Dan Shanahan	Lismore	1–19	22	5	4.40
6	Paul Kearney	Tallow	0–22	22	4	5.50
7	Séamus Prendergast	Ardmore	1–17	20	3	6.66

Top scorers in a single game

Rank	Player	Club	Tally	Total	Opposition
1	Paul Flynn	Ballygunner	2–06	12	Mount Sion
1	John Mullane	De La Salle	1–09	12	Tallow
2	Seán Daly	Lismore	2–05	11	Portlaw
2	Seán Daly	Lismore	2–05	11	Mount Sion
3	Paul Flynn	Ballygunner	2-04	10	De La Salle
3	Dave Bennett	Lismore	1–07	10	De La Salle
4	Barry Browne	Mount Sion	2–03	9	Lismore
4	James Cuddihy	Ballyduff Lower	1–06	9	Tallow
4	Shane Walsh	Fourmilewater	1–06	9	Ballyduff Lower
5	James Cuddihy	Ballyduff Lower	1–05	8	Ardmore
5	Freddie Kelly	Portlaw	1–05	8	Ballyduff Lower
5	John Mullane	De La Salle	1–05	8	Ballygunner
5	Tom Curran	Stradbally	0–08	8	Portlaw
5	Séamus Prendergast	Ardmore	0–08	8	Ballyduff Lower
5	Eoin Kelly	Mount Sion	0–08	8	Ballygunner
