= 2001 Waterford Senior Hurling Championship =

Annual hurling competition season

- Dates: 27 April 2001 – 30 September 2001
- Teams: 12
- Champions: Ballygunner (9th title); Billy O'Sullivan (captain); Gordon Ryan (manager)
- Runners-up: Lismore; James O'Connor (captain); Donal Shanahan (manager)
- Relegated: Shamrocks

Tournament statistics
- Matches played: 26
- Top scorer(s): Dave Bennett (1–45)

The 2001 Waterford Senior Hurling Championship was the 101st staging of the Waterford Senior Hurling Championship since its establishment by the Waterford County Board in 1897. The draw for the opening round fixtures took place on 5 February 2001. The championship began on 27 April 2001 and ended on 17 September 2001.

Mount Sion were the defending champions, however, they were defeated by Lismore in a semi-final replay.

On 17 September 2001, Ballygunner won the championship after a 4–12 to 1–16 defeat of Lismore in the final at Walsh Park. It was their 9th championship title overall and their first title since 1999.

Lismore's Dave Bennett was the championship's top scorer with 1–45.

== Team changes ==
=== To Championship ===
Promoted from the Waterford Intermediate Hurling Championship

- Ballyduff Lower

=== From Championship ===
Relegated to the Waterford Intermediate Hurling Championship

- Erin's Own

== Results ==
=== First round ===
27 April 2001 First round	Ballyduff Lower	1–04 – 0–12	Passage	Walsh Park, Waterford
	M Murphy 1–0, N Power 0–2, S O'Leary 0–1, J Kennedy 0–1.		A Brett 0–8, J Clooney 0–1, A Fitzgerald 0–1, R Walsh 0–1, S Flynn 0–1.	Referee: JM Kelly (Shamrocks)

28 April 2001 First round	Ballygunner	1–16 – 1–09	Stradbally	Walsh Park, Waterford
	P Flynn 0–8, A Moloney 1–2, B O'Sullivan 0–3, A Hearne 0–1, T Fives 0–1, P Power 0–1.		N Curran 1–2, T Curran 0–4, M Walsh 0–2, S Cunningham 0–1.	Referee: J Hunt (Clonea)

28 April 2001 First round	Portlaw	2–07 – 2–04	Shamrocks	Knockanore
	K Reade 1–2, M Hickey 1–1, J Hartley 0–1, P Duggan 0–1, J Laffan 0–1, E Galvin 0–1.		P Murphy 1–1, E Murphy 0–4, K O'Keeffe 1–0, P Tobin 0–1, S Murphy 0–1.	Referee: D O'Leary (Erin's Own)

29 April 2001 First round	De La Salle	0–05 – 1–16	Lismore	Fraher Field, Dungarvan
	M Kennedy 0–3, B Phelan 0–2, J Mullane 0–1.		D Bennett 0–7, D O'Gorman 1–1, D Shanahan 0–4, E Bennett 0–2, S Prendergast 0–1, D Howard 0–1.	Referee: P Moore (Abbeyside)

29 April 2001 First round	Roanmore	2–05 – 1–11	Tallow	Fraher Field, Dungarvan
	N Crowley 1–4, P Murphy 1–0, M Mackey 0–1.		P Kearney 0–7, B Sheehan 1–1, S Slattery 0–2, JP Grey 0–1, B Henley 0–1.	Referee: D O'Leary (Erin's Own)

29 April 2001 First round	Ballyduff Upper	1–07 – 4–16	Mount Sion	Fraher Field, Dungarvan
	M Molumphy 1–1, B Hannon 0–4, Tom Feeney 0–1, J Twomey 0–1.		K McGrath 0–8, S Ryan 2–0, E McGrath 0–5, T Browne 1–1, R McGrath 1–0, E Kelly 0–1, M White 0–1.	Referee: T O'Sullivan (Cappoquin)

=== Second round ===
23 June 2001 Second round	Ballyduff Upper	2–09 – 1–19	Stradbally	Fraher Field, Dungarvan
	B Hannon 0–7, S Molumphy 1–1, L McNamara 1–1.		T Curran 0–8, J Hearne 1–1, N Curran 0–4, G Power 0–3, M Walsh 0–1, O Costelloe 0–1, P Doyle 0–1.	Referee: D O'Leary (Erin's Own)

24 June 2001 Second round	De La Salle	1–10 – 1–10	Ballyduff Lower	Walsh Park, Waterford
	N Dalton 1–1, J Mullane 0–3, M Kennedy 0–2, L Hayes 0–2, B Phelan 0–2.		N Power 0–7, D Van Veen 1–2, J Kennedy 0–1.

24 June 2001 Second round	Shamrocks	0–06 – 1–10	Roanmore	Fraher Field, Dungarvan
	K O'Keeffe 0–4, E Murphy 0–2.		N Crowley 1–5, D Byrne 0–2, C Fanning 0–1, T Flynn 0–1, M Mackey 0–1.	Referee: T O'Sullivan (Cappoquin)

23 June 2001 Second round	Passage	0–09 – 1–16	Ballygunner	Walsh Park, Waterford
	A Brett 0–8, C Carey 0–1.		P Flynn 1–7, P Foley 0–4, B O'Sullivan 0–3, P Power 0–1, M Mahoney 0–1.	Referee: B Power (Mount Sion)

24 June 2001 Second round	Portlaw	1–12 – 1–07	Tallow	Fraher Field, Dungarvan
	F Kelly 0–9, J Laffan 1–0, G O'Brien 0–1, M Hickey 0–1, J Hartley 0–1.		JP Grey 1–1, B Sheehan 0–2, P O'Brien 0–1, P Kearney 0–1, M Geary 0–1, B Henley 0–1, A Kearney 0–1.	Referee: T O'Byrne (Erin's Own)

24 June 2001 Second round	Lismore	0–18 – 0–10	Mount Sion	Fraher Field, Dungarvan
	D Bennett 0–10, E Bennett 0–4, D Shanahan 0–2, D Howard 0–1, P Prendergast 0–1.		E McGrath 0–4, K McGrath 0–2, S Ryan 0–1, M White 0–1, T Browne 0–1, E Kelly 0–1.	Referee: P Moore (Abbeyside)

30 June 2001 Second round replay	De La Salle	0–18 – 2–16 (aet)	Ballyduff Lower	Walsh Park, Waterford
	M Kennedy 0–8, J Mullane 0–4, L Lawlor 0–2, B Phelan 0–2, A Kelly 0–1, N Dalton 0–1.		N Power 0–11, J O'Leary 1–3, S O'Leary 1–0, J Kennedy 0–2.	Referee: S Flynn (Fenor)

=== Relegation play-offs ===
3 August 2001 Round 1	De La Salle	1–14 – 2–07	Ballyduff Upper	Fraher Field, Dungarvan
	J Mullane 1–5, F O'Brien 0–3, A Kelly 0–2, L Lawlor 0–2, R Murphy 0–1, N Dalton 0–1.		B Hannon 0–5, S Molumphy 1–0, T Molumphy 1–0, J Twomey 0–1, M Walsh 0–1.	Referee: P Moore (Abbeyside)

30 September 2001 Round 2	Ballyduff Upper	2–10 – 1–09	Shamrocks	Cappoquin

=== Losers' group ===
13 July 2001 Round 1	Mount Sion	4–16 – 1–07	Ballyduff Lower	Walsh Park, Waterford
	T Browne 1–7, R McGrath 2–1, E McGrath 1–1, M White 0–3, E Kelly 0–2, P Fanning 0–2.		N Power 0–4, S O'Leary 1–0, J O'Leary 0–1, M Murphy 0–1, S Larkin 0–1.	Referee: T O'Sullivan (Cappoquin)

15 July 2001 Round 1	Passage	1–09 – 0–12	Roanmore	Walsh Park, Waterford
	A Brett 0–6, T O'Sullivan 1–1, B Walsh 0–2.		N Crowley 0–5, L O'Neill 0–4, T Dunphy 0–1, J Caulfield 0–1, M Mackey 0–1.	Referee: S Flynn (Fenor)

22 July 2001 Round 1	Tallow	3–12 – 2–15	Stradbally	Fraher Field, Dungarvan
	P Kearney 0–7, B Henley 1–1, B Sheehan 1–0, S Slattery 1–0, D O'Brien 0–2, J Murray 0–1, P O'Brien 0–1.		M Walsh 1–3, T Curran 0–5, N Curran 0–4, A Darcy 1–0, G Walsh 0–2, J Coffey 0–1.	Referee: D O'Leary (Erin's Own)

25 July 2001 Round 1 replay	Roanmore	0–16 – 0–14 (aet)	Passage	Walsh Park, Waterford
	N Crowley 0–10, L O'Neill 0–3, J Caulfield 0–2, T Dunphy 0–1.		A Brett 0–7, B Walsh 0–2, T O'Sullivan 0–2, I Connors 0–1, C Carey 0–1, J Hanrahan 0–1.

4 August 2001 Round 1 replay	Tallow	4–10 – 2–15	Stradbally
	P Kearney 1–6, M O'Brien 2–0, J Murray 1–0, D O'Brien 0–2, P Murray 0–1, B Henley 0–1.		T Curran 1–4, M Walsh 0–6, P Casey 1–2, N Curran 0–2, G Walsh 0–1.	Referee: D O'Leary (Erin's Own)

12 August 2001 Round 2	Mount Sion	1–17 – 0–14	Roanmore	Walsh Park, Waterford
	T Browne 0–8, S Ryan 1–2, J O'Meara 0–2, E Kelly 0–2, K McGrath 0–2, I Power 0–1.		N Crowley 0–7, C Fanning 0–4, D Murphy 0–2, M Mackey 0–1.	Referee: JM Kelly (Shamrocks)

=== Quarter-final ===
20 August 2001 Quarter-final	Mount Sion	1–18 – 1–11	Tallow	Fraher Field, Dungarvan
	K McGrath 0–9, I Power 1–1, J Meaney 0–3, S Ryan 0–2, E Kelly 0–1, Jim Meaney 0–1, P Fanning 0–1.		P Kearney 0–5, D O'Brien 1–0, S Slattery 0–2, P O'Brien 0–1, B Henley 0–1, J Murray 0–1, B Sheehan 0–1.	Referee: P Moore (Abbeyside)

=== Semi-finals ===
19 August 2001 Semi-final	Ballygunner	4–08 – 1–07	Portlaw	Walsh Park, Waterford
	P Flynn 1–3, B O'Sullivan 1–2, A Moloney 1–0, P Foley 1–0, S Frampton 0–2, P Power 0–1.		F Kelly 1–2, A Kirwan 0–3, G O'Brien 0–1, H Maher 0–1.	Referee: D O'Leary (Erin's Own)

26 August 2001 Semi-final	Lismore	1–13 – 1–13	Mount Sion	Fraher Field, Dungarvan
	D Bennett 0–9, S Daly 1–1, B Prendergast 0–1, D Shanahan 0–1, D Howard 0–1.		S Ryan 1–3, T Browne 0–4, E Kelly 0–2, J Meaney 0–1, D O'Meara 0–1, K McGrath 0–1, E McGrath 0–1.	Referee: P Moore (Abbeyside)

2 September 2001 Semi-final replay	Lismore	4–19 – 3–13 (aet)	Mount Sion	Fraher Field, Dungarvan
	D Bennett 1–9, S Daly 1–5, E Bennett 2–0, D Shanahan 0–3, D Howard 0–1, W Cunningham 0–1.		S Ryan 2–1, K McGrath 0–5, I Power 1–0, T Browne 0–2, E Kelly 0–2, J O'Meara 0–1, E McGrath 0–1, P Fanning 0–1.	Referee: P Moore (Abbeyside)

=== Final ===
17 September 2001 Final	Ballygunner	4–12 – 1–16	Lismore	Walsh Park, Waterford
	B O'Sullivan 1–2, P Flynn 1–2 (0–2 frees), D O'Sullivan and A Moloney 1–0 each, S Frampton 0–3 (frees), T Carroll 0–2, A Hearne and M Mahony 0–1 each, P Foley 0–1 free.	Report	D Bennett 0–10 (0–7 frees), S Daly 1–1, D Shanahan 0–2, P Prendergast, S Kearney and E Bennett 0–1 each.	Attendance: 9,000; Referee: P Walsh (Fourmilewater)

== Championship statistics ==
=== Top scorers ===
Top scorers overall

Rank	Player	Club	Tally	Total	Matches	Average
1	Dave Bennett	Lismore	1–45	48	5	9.60
2	Noel Crowley	Roanmore	2–31	37	5	7.40
3	Paul Flynn	Ballygunner	3–20	29	4	7.25
3	Tony Browne	Mount Sion	2–23	29	6	4.83
3	Paul Kearney	Tallow	1–26	29	5	5.80
3	Alan Brett	Passage	0–29	29	4	7.25
4	Seán Ryan	Mount Sion	6–09	27	6	4.83
4	Ken McGrath	Mount Sion	0–27	27	6	4.83
5	Niall Power	Ballyduff Lower	0–24	24	4	6.00

Top scorers in a single game

Rank	Player	Club	Tally	Total	Opposition
1	Dave Bennett	Lismore	1-09	12	Mount Sion
2	Niall Power	Ballyduff Upper	0–11	11	De La Salle
3	Paul Flynn	Ballygunner	1–07	10	Passage
3	Tony Browne	Mount Sion	1–07	10	Ballyduff Lower
3	Dave Bennett	Lismore	0–10	10	Mount Sion
3	Noel Crowley	Roanmore	0–10	10	Passage
3	Dave Bennett	Lismore	0–10	10	Ballygunner
4	Paul Kearney	Tallow	1–06	9	Stradbally
4	Freddie Kelly	Portlaw	0–09	9	Tallow
4	Ken McGrath	Mount Sion	0–09	9	Tallow
4	Dave Bennett	Lismore	0–09	9	Mount Sion
