= 2000 Waterford Senior Hurling Championship =

Annual hurling competition season

- Dates: 23 April 2000 – 10 September 2000
- Teams: 12
- Sponsor: Top Oil
- Champions: Mount Sion (31st title); Ken McGrath (captain)
- Runners-up: Ballygunner; Paul Flynn (captain)
- Relegated: Erin's Own

Tournament statistics
- Matches played: 24
- Goals scored: 58 (2.42 per match)
- Points scored: 533 (22.21 per match)
- Top scorer(s): Trevor Curran (1–38)

The 2000 Waterford Senior Hurling Championship was the 100th staging of the Waterford Senior Hurling Championship since its establishment by the Waterford County Board in 1897. The draw for the opening round fixtures took place on 14 February 2000. The championship began on 23 April 2000 and ended on 10 September 2000.

Ballygunner were the defending champions.

On 3 September 2000, Mount Sion won the championship after a 1–20 to 0–09 defeat of Ballygunner in the final at Walsh Park. It was their 31st championship title overall and their first title since 1998.

Stradbally's Trevor Curran was the championship's top scorer with 1–38.

== Team changes ==
=== To Championship ===
Promoted from the Waterford Intermediate Hurling Championship

- Shamrocks

=== From Championship ===
Relegated to the Waterford Intermediate Hurling Championship

- Fourmilewater

== Format change ==
At a meeting of the Waterford County Board on 14 February 2000, the proposal to restructure the championship format was voted on and overwhelmingly accepted by delegates. Chairman Paddy Joe Ryan's proposal to end the participation of group teams in the championship after a three-year trial period was also accepted. The new format allowed for the participation of 12 club teams. The four semi-finalists of the previous year were to be seeded so as not to meet in the opening round of six games. The six losing first round teams would be divided into two groups of three to play a round-robin series with the winning team in each group going forward to join the six first-round winners in an open draw for the quarter-finals.

== Results ==
=== First round ===
23 April 2000 First round	Ballyduff Upper	2–10 – 1–06	Passage	Fraher Field, Dungarvan
	B Hannon 0–6, T Molumphy 1–0, K Geary 1–0, T Feeney 0–3, B Kearney 0–1.		A Fitzgerald 1–1, B Walsh 0–2, A Brett 0–1, J Heffernan 0–1, R Walsh 0–1.	Referee: P Moore (Abbeyside)

23 April 2000 First round	Ballygunner	2–17 – 0–06	Shamrocks	Fraher Field, Dungarvan
	P Flynn 0–7, T Carroll 0–5, P Foley 0–4, B O'Sullivan 1–0, D O'Sullivan 1–0, C Kehoe 0–1.		K O'Keeffe 0–3, E Murphy 0–2, L Dalton 0–1.	Referee: P Walsh (Fourmilewater)

23 April 2000 First round	Mount Sion	3–15 – 1–12	Stradbally	Fraher Field, Dungarvan
	K McGrath 0–10, M White 1–1, A Kirwan 1–1, D Acheson 1–0, M O'Regan 0–2, T Browne 0–1.		T Curran 0–9, J Hearne 1–0, T Costelloe 0–1, N Curran 0–1, G Power 0–1.	Referee: J Hunt (Clonea)

23 April 2000 First round	De La Salle	1–18 – 0–05	Roanmore	Walsh Park, Waterford
	J Mullane 0–6, M Kennedy 1–1, D McGrath 0–3, N Dalton 0–2, B Phelan 0–2, J Brenner 0–2, B Power 0–2.		N Crowley 0–3, P Tobin 0–1, C Ryan 0–1.	Referee: JM Kelly (Shamrocks)

23 April 2000 First round	Lismore	2–16 – 1–10	Tallow	Cappoquin
	D Bennett 1–4, S Daly 0–7, B Prendergast 1–0, D Shanahan 0–3, P Prendergast 0–1, E Bennett 0–1.		B Henley 1–1, S Curley 0–4, S Slattery 0–1, M Geary 0–1, J Murray 0–1, R Henley 0–1, S (Finn) McCarthy 0–1.	Referee: P Moore (Abbeyside)

29 April 2000 First round	Erin's Own	0–12 – 2–09	Portlaw	Walsh Park, Waterford
	N Kelly 0–5, P Cooley 0–2, A Dowling 0–2, K Lambe 0–1, M Gater 0–1, M Gater 0–1.		M Hickey 1–3, P Walsh 1–0, K Reade 0–2, G O'Brien 0–1, P Duggan 0–1, J Hartley 0–1, F Kelly 0–1.	Referee: S Flynn (Fenor)

=== Losers' group ===
==== Group A ====
===== Group A table =====
Advanced to quarter-finals Advanced to relegation play-offs

Team	Matches				Score			Pts
Team	Pld	W	D	L	For	Against	Diff	Pts
Passage	2	2	0	0	46	33	13	4
Stradbally	2	1	0	1	35	43	−8	2
Erin's Own	2	0	0	2	27	32	−5	0

===== Group A results =====
30 June 2000 Round 1	Passage	0–16 – 0–14	Erin's Own	Walsh Park, Waterford
	A Brett 0–5, B Walsh 0–4, J Heffernan 0–2, S Carey 0–2, E Fitzgerald 0–2, A Fitzgerald 0–1.		K Lambe 0–4, P Cooley 0–4, N Kelly 0–4, P Delahunty 0–1, J Spencer 0–1.	Referee: S Flynn (Fenor)

13 July 2000 Round 2	Passage	5–15 – 2–13	Stradbally	Walsh Park, Waterford
	A Brett 1–8, C Carey 2–1, S Carey 1–1, J Hanrahan 1–0, B Walsh 0–2, A Fitzgerald 0–1, J Treacy 0–1, J Heffernan 0–1.		M Walsh 2–1, T Curran 0–7, S Cunningham 0–2, K Coffey 0–1, E O'Brien 0–1.	Referee: JM Kelly (Shamrocks)

21 July 2000 Round 3	Erin's Own	1–10 – 2–10	Stradbally	Fraher Field, Dungarvan
	N Kelly 0–7, A Robinson 1–1, S O'Brien 0–1, D Robinson 0–1.		T Curran 0–6, G Walsh 2–0, N Curran 0–2, M Walsh 0–1, S Cunningham 0–1.

==== Group B ====
===== Group B table =====
Advanced to quarter-finals Advanced to relegation play-offs

Team	Matches				Score			Pts
Team	Pld	W	D	L	For	Against	Diff	Pts
Roanmore	2	1	1	0	21	17	4	3
Tallow	2	1	1	0	21	16	5	3
Shamrocks	2	0	0	2	15	24	−9	0

===== Group B results =====
1 July 2000 Round 1	Roanmore	0–12 – 1–05	Shamrocks	Fraher Field, Dungarvan
	J Delahunty 0–6, J Caulfield 0–3, N Crowley 0–2, T Dunphy 0–1.		E Murphy 1–2, K O'Keeffe 0–2, L Murphy 0–1.	Referee: P Moore (Abbeyside)

16 July 2000 Round 2	Roanmore	0–09 – 0–09	Tallow	Fraher Field, Dungarvan
	K Delahunty 0–3, C Fanning 0–3, D Ryan 0–1, D Murphy 0–1, T Dunphy 0–1.		JP Grey 0–4, B Henley 0–2, S Slattery 0–1, M Geary 0–1, P Kearney 0–1.	Referee: J Hunt (Clonea)

21 July 2000 Round 3	Shamrocks	0–07 – 0–12	Tallow	Cappoquin
	K O'Keeffe 0–2, M Murphy 0–2, P Murphy 0–1, D Casey 0–1, E Murphy 0–1.		P O'Brien 0–4, JP Grey 0–4, P Kearney 0–2, J Murray 0–1, R Henley 0–1.

===== Group B play-off =====
29 July 2000 Play-off	Roanmore	3–13 – 2–09	Tallow	Fraher Field, Dungarvan
	K Delahunty 3–7, N Crowley 0–2, J Caulfield 0–2, C Fanning 0–1, T Dunphy 0–1.		JP Grey 1–5, J Murray 1–0, B Henley 0–2, R Henley 0–1, P O'Brien 0–1.	Referee: J Hunt (Clonea)

=== Relegation play-offs ===
26 August 2000 Semi-final	Stradbally	3–04 – 1–10	Shamrocks	Cappoquin
	A Darcy 2–0, T Curran 0–4, S Cunningham 1–0.		K O'Keeffe 0–8, P Murphy 1–0, M Murphy 0–1, E Murphy 0–1.	Referee: T O'Sullivan (Cappoquin)

27 August 2000 Semi-final	Tallow	1–15 – 2–09	Erin's Own	Fraher Field, Dungarvan
	R Henley 1–6, S Slattery 0–2, P O'Brien 0–2, J Barry 0–2, B Henley 0–2, S Cunningham 0–1.		D Robinson 1–1, S O'Brien 1–1, N Kelly 0–3, A Robinson 0–2, P Cooley 0–1, L Kelly 0–1.	Referee: T O'Sullivan (Cappoquin)

2 September 2000 Semi-final replay	Stradbally	1–07 – 1–08	Shamrocks	Cappoquin
	T Curran 0–6, N Curran 1–0, M Walsh 0–1.		K O'Keeffe 0–5, M Murphy 1–0, P Tobin 0–1, P Murphy 0–1, S Murphy 0–1.	Referee: T O'Sullivan (Cappoquin)

10 September 2000 Final	Erin's Own	0–10 – 1–10	Stradbally	Fraher Field, Dungarvan
			T Curran 1–6, N Curran 0–3, J Hearne 0–1, M Walsh 0–1.

=== Quarter-finals ===
28 July 2000 Quarter-final	De La Salle	1–12 – 0–09	Passage	Walsh Park, Waterford
	M Kennedy 0–6, B Power 1–0, J Mullane 0–3, N Dalton 0–1, J Brenner 0–1, D McGrath 0–1.		A Brett 0–4, B Walsh 0–2, R Walsh 0–2, E Cullinane 0–1.	Referee: P Walsh (Fourmilewater)

30 July 2000 Quarter-final	Ballygunner	4–11 – 2–14	Lismore	Fraher Field, Dungarvan
	P Flynn 0–7, B Foley 2–0, B O'Sullivan 2–0, T Carroll 0–3, M Mahony 0–1, P Power 0–1.		D Bennett 2–10, P Prendergast 0–2, D Howard 0–1, S Prendergast 0–1.	Referee: M Wadding (Roanmore)

30 July 2000 Quarter-final	Mount Sion	2–19 – 1–07	Ballyduff Upper	Fraher Field, Dungarvan
	M White 1–7, B Browne 1–2, T Browne 0–3, A Kirwan 0–2, D Acheson 0–2, P Fanning 0–1, E Kelly 0–1, D Kelly 0–1.		T Molumphy 1–0, B Hannon 0–3, P Prendergast 0–3, J Twomey 0–1.	Referee: P Moore (Abbeyside)

6 August 2000 Quarter-final	Roanmore	1–12 – 1–07	Portlaw	Walsh Park, Waterford
	K Delahunty 1–4, N Crowley 0–2, D Ryan 0–2, C Fanning 0–1, J Caulfield 0–1, D Murphy 0–1, M Mackey 0–1.		M Hickey 1–1, A Kirwan 0–4, G O'Brien 0–1, K Reade 0–1.	Referee: JM Kelly (Shamrocks)

=== Semi-finals ===
20 August 2000 Semi-final	Ballygunner	3–17 – 0–07	Roanmore	Walsh Park, Waterford
	P Flynn 1–8, T Carroll 1–2, M Mahoney 1–0, P Foley 0–2, P Power 0–2, B O'Sullivan 0–1, A Cummins 0–1.		K Delahunty 0–3, T Dunphy 0–1, C Fanning 0–1, N Crowley 0–1, L O'Neill 0–1.	Referee: T O'Sullivan (Cappoquin)

20 August 2000 Semi-final	Mount Sion	1–14 – 0–12	De La Salle	Walsh Park, Waterford
	T Browne 1–7, E Kelly 0–4, B Browne 0–1, A Kirwan 0–1, M O'Regan 0–1.		M Kennedy 0–9, J Mullane 0–2, B Phelan 0–1.	Referee: JM Kelly (Shamrocks)

=== Final ===
3 September 2000 Final	Mount Sion	1–20 – 0–09	Ballygunner	Walsh Park, Waterford
	T Browne 1–7 (0–4 F), A Kirwan 0–5, E Kelly 0–3 (1 `65), K McGrath 0–3, B Browne, P Fanning 0–1 each.		P Flynn 0–4 (0–3 F), P Power 0–2, P O'Sullivan, P Foley, M Mahony 0–1 each.	Referee: P Moore (Abbeyside)

== Championship statistics ==
=== Top scorers ===
Overall

Rank	Player	Club	Tally	Total	Matches	Average
1	Trevor Curran	Stradbally	1–38	41	6	6.83
2	Kieran Delahunty	Roanmore	4–17	29		
3	Paul Flynn	Ballygunner	1–26	29	4	7.25
4	Tony Browne	Mount Sion	2–18	24	4	6.00
5	Dave Bennett	Lismore	3–14	23	2	11.50
5	Noel Kelly	Erin's Own	0–23	23	5	4.60
6	Alan Brett	Passage	1–18	21	4	5.25
7	Kevin O'Keeffe	Shamrocks	0–20	20	5	4.00
8	Mark Kennedy	De La Salle	1–16	19	3	6.33
9	Anthony Kirwan	Mount Sion	1–13	16	5	3.20

In a single game

Rank	Player	Club	Tally	Total	Opposition
1	Kieran Delahunty	Roanmore	3-07	16	Tallow
1	Dave Bennett	Lismore	2–10	16	Ballygunner
2	Alan Brett	Passage	1-08	11	Stradbally
2	Paul Flynn	Ballygunner	1-08	11	Roanmore
3	Michael White	Mount Sion	1-07	10	Ballyduff Upper
3	Tony Browne	Mount Sion	1-07	10	De La Salle
3	Tony Browne	Mount Sion	1-07	10	Ballygunner
3	Ken McGrath	Mount Sion	0–10	10	Stradbally
4	Roy Henley	Tallow	1-06	9	Erin's Own
4	Trevor Curran	Stradbally	0-09	9	Mount Sion
4	Mark Kennedy	De La Salle	0-09	9	Mount Sion
