= 1999 Waterford Senior Hurling Championship =

Annual hurling competition season

- Dates: 16 July 1999 – 19 September 1999
- Teams: 16
- Sponsor: Top Oil
- Champions: Ballygunner (8th title); Paul Flynn (captain)
- Runners-up: Mount Sion; Brian Flannery (captain)
- Relegated: Fourmilewater

Tournament statistics
- Matches played: 19
- Top scorer(s): Paul Flynn (3–30)

The 1999 Waterford Senior Hurling Championship was the 99th staging of the Waterford Senior Hurling Championship since its establishment by the Waterford County Board in 1897. The draw for the opening round fixtures took place in February 1999. The championship began on 16 July 1999 and ended on 19 September 1999.

Mount Sion were the defending champions.

On 19 September 1999, Ballygunner won the championship after a 1–18 to 2–10 defeat of Mount Sion in the final at Walsh Park. It was their 8th championship title overall and their first title since 1997.

Ballygunner's Paul Flynn was the championship's top scorer with 3–30.

== Results ==
=== First round ===
16 July 1999 First round	Roanmore	1–11 – 0–10	Fourmilewater	Fraher Field, Dungarvan
	K Delahunty 0–6, T Dunphy 1–0, P Tobin 0–2, J Caulfied 0–1, C Fanning 0–1, N Crowley 0–1.		M Guiry 0–6, D Ryan 0–3, R Rice 0–1.	Referee: E Cunningham (Tallow)

17 July 1999 First round	Mount Sion	5–07 – 0–13	Portlaw	Walsh Park, Waterford
	J Meaney 2–4, B Browne 2–0, G Gater 1–1, P Fanning 0–1, K McGrath 0–1.		P Kelly 0–8, G O'Brien 0–2, J Hartley 0–1, A Kirwan 0–1, K Reade 0–1.

17 July 1999 First round	Stradbally	2–08 – 2–11	Ballygunner	Walsh Park, Waterford
	G Power 1–1, S Cunningham 1–0, N Curran 0–3, T Curran 0–2, T Costelloe 0–1, J Hearne 0–1.		P Flynn 2–4, T Carroll 0–2, A Kirwan 0–2, T Fives 0–2, B O'Sullivan 0–1.	Referee: S Flynn (Fenor)

17 July 1999 First round	Gleann Bríde	4–15 – 0–04	Faughs	Fraher Field, Dungarvan
	S Prendergast 2–4

18 July 1999 First round	Tallow	0–09 – 2–09	Erin's Own	Fraher Field, Dungarvan
	S McCarthy 0–3, JP Grey 0–2, R Henley 0–1, D Henley 0–1, B Henley 0–1, S Curley 0–1.		N Kelly 1–6, D Robinson 1–1, Michael Gater 0–1, B Butler 0–1.	Referee: T Mansfield (CAppoquin-Affane)

18 July 1999 First round	De La Salle	3–21 – 0–04	Meaghers	Walsh Park, Waterford
	M Kennedy 0–7, J Brenner 1–3, J Mullane 1–2, B Power 1–1, B Phelan 0–4, F O'Brien 0–2, D McGrath 0–1, N Dalton 0–1.		P Matthews 0–2, S Ahearne 0–1, A Heffernan 0–1.	Referee: B Power (Mount Sion)

18 July 1999 First round	Ballyduff Upper	1–08 – 2–14	Lismore	Cappoquin
	P Prendergast 0–5, D Hannon 1–0, M Molumphy 0–1, B Hannon 0–1, J Twomey 0–1.		E Bennett 1–2, M Hickey 0–5, S Daly 1–1, D Bennett 0–4, P Quinn 0–1, D Shanahan 0–1.	Referee: P Moore (Abbeyside)

18 July 1999 First round	Gleann na nDéise	1–08 – 2–11	Passage	Fraher Field, Dungarvan
	JP Fitzpatrick 0–7, M Enright 1–1.		A Brett 0–6, E Fitzgerald 1–0, A Fitzgerald 1–0, J Heffernan 0–3, P Fitzgerald 0–1, R Walsh 0–1.	Referee: J Hunt (Clonea)

=== Relegation play-offs ===
11 September 1999 Round 1	Stradbally	0–14 – 1–09	Portlaw	Walsh Park, Waterford
	T Costelloe 0–4, T Curran 0–3, S Cunningham 0–3, N Curran 0–2, E O'Brien 0–2.		O Atkins 1–6, D Foran 0–1, B Laffan 0–1, E Galvin 0–1.	Referee: M Wadding (Roanmore)

18 September 1999 Round 2	Tallow	4–07 – 2–03	Portlaw	Fraher Field, Dungarvan
	R Henley 2–1, S Curley 0–5, B Henley 1–1, P Murphy 1–0.		O Atkins 1–1, P Duggan 1–0, B Laffan 0–2.	Referee: T o'Sullivan (Affane)

23 October 1999 Round 2	Fourmilewater	2–06 – 0–21	Ballyduff Upper	Cappoquin
	G Walsh 1–0, P Halpin 1–0, R Rice 0–2, D Ryan 0–1, M Ryan 0–1, D Connolly 0–1, J Walsh 0–1.		B Hannon 0–10, P Prendergast 0–5, M Molumphy 0–2, A Martin 0–1, G Hickey 0–1, D Hannon 0–1, T Feeney 0–1.	Referee: T O'Sullivan (Affane)

30 October 1999 Round 3	Portlaw	0–13 – 2–01	Fourmilewater	Fraher Field, Dungarvan
	Pat Duggan 0–4, D Foran 0–2, O Atkins 0–2, Declan Walsh 0–2, G O'Brien 0–1, Paul Duggan 0–1, J Hartley 0–1.		M Guiry 1–1, M Walsh 1–0.	Referee: J Hunt (Clonea)

=== Quarter-finals ===
8 August 1999 Quarter-final	Ballygunner	1–22 – 0–10	Erin's Own	Walsh Park, Waterford
	P Flynn 0–8, T Carroll 0–7, M Mahoney 1–1, D O'Sullivan 0–2, B O'Sullivan 0–2, C Kehoe 0–1, T Fives 0–1.		N Kelly 0–8, Mark Gater 0–1, Micheal Gater 0–1.	Referee: J Hunt (Clonea)

8 August 1999 Quarter-final	Mount Sion	4–11 – 0–12	De La Salle	Walsh Park, Waterford
	B Browne 2–0, D Kelly 1–1, E McGrath 1–1, J Meaney 0–3, K McGrath 0–3, R McGrath 0–1, E Kelly 0–1, B Flannery 0–1.		M Kennedy 0–6, J Brenner 0–3, G Brenner 0–1, D McGrath 0–1, B Power 0–1.	Referee: P Moore (Abbeyside)

8 August 1999 Quarter-final	Lismore	2–15 – 0–09	Gleann Bríde	Fraher Field, Dungarvan
	M Hickey 0–6, E Bennett 1–2, D O'Gorman 1–1, D Shanahan 0–3, B Prendergast 0–2, D Bennett 0–1.		S Prendergast 0–3, S Murphy 0–2, S Barron 0–1, S O'Rourke 0–1, L Dalton 0–1, E Curran 0–1.	Referee: S Flynn (Fenor)

14 August 1999 Quarter-final	Passage	1–11 – 1–10	Roanmore	Walsh Park, Waterford
	A Brett 0–6, B Walsh 1–1, A Fitzgerald 0–2, P Connors 0–1, S Carey 0–1.		T Dunphy 1–3, K Delahunty 0–3, D Murphy 0–1, C Fanning 0–1, N Crowley 0–1, J Caulfield 0–1.	Referee: T O'Sullivan (Cappoquin)

=== Semi-finals ===
4 September 1999 Semi-final	Mount Sion	2–16 – 2–06	Passage	Walsh Park, Waterford
	A Kirwan 2–2, K McGrath 0–6, G Gater 0–4, B Browne 0–2, D Kelly 0–1, P Fanning 0–1.		A Brett 1–4, B Walsh 1–2.

5 September 1999 Semi-final	Ballygunner	1–18 – 0–13	Lismore	Fraher Field, Dungarvan
	P Flynn 0–10, B O'Sullivan 1–1, T Carroll 0–3, M Mahoney 0–2, T Fives 0–1, D O'Sullivan 0–1.		D Bennett 0–7, S Daly 0–3, D O'Gorman 0–1, D Shanahan 0–1, P Prendergast 0–1.	Referee: P Moore (Abbeyside)

=== Final ===
19 September 1999 Final	Ballygunner	1–18 – 2–10	Mount Sion	Walsh Park, Waterford
	P Flynn 1–8, M Mahoney 0–4, T Carroll 0–3, B O'Sullivan 0–2, A Kirwan 0–1.		B Browne 0–6, K McGrath 0–4, Eoin Kelly 1–0, P Fanning 1–0.	Referee: J Hunt (Clonea)

== Championship statistics ==
=== Top scorers ===
Top scorers overall

Rank	Player	Club	Tally	Total	Matches	Average
1	Paul Flynn	Ballygunner	3–30	39	4	9.75
2	Barry Browne	Ballygunner	4-08	20	4	5.00
3	Alan Brett	Passage	1–16	19	3	6.33
4	Noel Kelly	Erin's Own	1–14	17	2	8.50
5	Ollie Atkins	Portlaw	2-09	15	4	3.75
5	Tony Carroll	Ballygunner	0–15	15	4	3.75
6	Ken McGrath	Mount Sion	0–14	14	4	3.50
7	John Meaney	Mount Sion	2-07	13	2	6.50
7	Séamus Prendergast	Gleann Bríde	2-07	13	2	6.50
7	Mark Kennedy	De La Salle	0–13	13	2	6.50

Top scorers in a single game

Rank	Player	Club	Tally	Total	Opposition
1	Paul Flynn	Ballygunner	1-08	11	Mount Sion
2	Paul Flynn	Ballygunner	2-04	10	Stradbally
2	John Meaney	Mount Sion	2-04	10	Portlaw
2	Séamus Prendergast	Gleann Bríde	2-04	10	Faughs
2	Paul Flynn	Ballygunner	0–10	10	Lismore
2	Brendan Hannon	Ballyduff Upper	0–10	10	Fourmilewater
3	Noel Kelly	Erin's Own	1-06	9	Tallow
3	Ollie Atkins	Portlaw	1-06	9	Stradbally
4	Anthony Kirwan	Ballygunner	2-02	8	Passage
4	Freddie Kelly	Portlaw	0-08	8	Mount Sion
4	Paul Flynn	Ballygunner	0-08	8	Erin's Own
4	Noel Kelly	Erin's Own	0-08	8	Ballygunner
