= Peter Hogan (hurler) =

Irish hurler (born 1997)

Personal information
- Native name: Peadar Ó hÓgáin (Irish)
- Born: 3 January 1997 (age 29) Ballygunner, County Waterford, Ireland
- Occupation: Student
- Height: 5 ft 10 in (178 cm)

Sport
- Sport: Hurling
- Position: Right corner-forward
Club
- Years: Club
- Ballygunner
Club titles
- Waterford titles: 12
- Munster titles: 5
- All-Ireland Titles: 1
College
- Years: College
- DCU Dóchas Éireann
College titles
- Fitzgibbon titles: 0
Inter-county*
Years	County	Apps (scores)
2016-present	Waterford	2 (0-02)
Inter-county titles
- Munster titles: 0
- All-Irelands: 0
- NHL: 1
- All Stars: 0
- *Inter County team apps and scores correct as of 16:04 3rd of December 2023.

Peter Hogan (born 3 January 1997) is an Irish hurler who plays for Waterford Senior Championship club Ballygunner and at inter-county level with the Waterford senior hurling team. He usually lines out as a right corner-forward.

== Playing career ==
=== Ballygunner ===
Hogan joined the Ballygunner club at a young age and played in all grades at juvenile and underage levels, enjoying championship success as a member of the club's minor team in 2015.

Hogan was still a minor when he was added to the Ballygunner senior team during the 2014 Waterford Championship. On 5 October, he was introduced as a 38th-minute substitute for Conor Power in the final. Ballygunner defeated Mount Sion by 2–16 to 0-09, with Hogan collecting a winners' medal.

Hogan became a regular member of the starting fifteen during the 2015 Waterford Championship. He won a second championship medal on 18 October after scoring three points from left corner-forward in a 0–16 to 0–12 defeat of Tallow in the final.

On 23 October 2016, Hogan lined out in a third successive Waterford Championship final. He scored three points from left corner-forward ad collected a third winners' medal after a 4–20 to 1–12 defeat of Passage in the final.

On 22 October 2017, Hogan lined out in a fourth successive final with Ballygunner. After being named at right wing-forward, he spent much of the game at right corner-forward. Hogan claimed a fourth winners' medal after scoring a point in the 2–18 to 0–16 defeat of De La Salle.

Hogan won a fifth successive Waterford Championship title on 7 October 2018. He was a non-playing substitute in the 2–19 to 0–13 defeat of Abbeyside in the final. Hogan returned to the starting fifteen during the subsequent Munster Championship. On 18 November, he won a Munster Championship medal following Ballygunner's 2–14 to 2–08 defeat of Na Piarsaigh in the final.

On 13 October 2019, Hogan lined out at right corner-forward when Ballygunner faced De La Salle in the Waterford Senior Championship final. He ended the game on the winning side and collected a sixth winners' medal after scoring three points from play in the 1–24 to 1–15 victory.

=== Waterford ===
==== Minor and under-21 ====
Hogan first played for Waterford as a member of the minor team during the 2014 Munster Championship. He made his first appearance on 9 April when he lined out at left corner-forward in a 1–13 to 0–11 defeat of Clare. Hogan was switched to right wing-forward when Waterford suffered a 0–24 to 0–18 defeat by Limerick in the Munster final replay on 22 July.

Hogan was again eligible for the minor grade during the 2015 Munster Championship. He played his last game in the grade on 6 May when he lined out at left corner-forward in an 0–18 to 1–10 defeat by Limerick.

Hogan progressed onto the Waterford under-21 team during the 2016 Munster Championship. He made his first appearance for the team on 13 July when he came on as a 48th-minute substitute for Conor Prunty in a 3–23 to 1–11 defeat of Clare. On 27 July, Hogan lined out in his first Munster final. After starting the game on the bench he scored a goal after being introduced as a substitute in the 2–19 to 0–15 defeat of Tipperary. On 10 September, Hogan started the All-Ireland final against Galway on the bench. He came on as a substitute for Shane Bennett and collected a winners' medal following a 5–15 to 0–14 victory.

Hogan became a regular member of the starting fifteen during the 2017 Munster Championship. He made his first start on 13 July in a 2–17 to 1–19 defeat by Cork.

On 20 June 2018, Hogan played his last game for the Waterford under-21 team. He scored a point from left corner-forward in a 0–23 to 1–17 defeat by Cork in the Munster semi-final.

==== Intermediate ====
Hogan was called up to the Waterford intermediate team before the 2016 Munster Championship. He made his only appearance for the team on 5 June in a 3–20 to 2–12 defeat by Clare.

==== Senior ====
Hogan made his first appearance for the Waterford senior team on 19 January 2016. He was introduced as a 52nd-minute substitute for Colin Dunford in a 3–16 to 1–17 defeat by Limerick in the Munster League. Hogan was not included on Waterford's National League and Munster Championship panels.

Hogan was recalled to the Waterford panel for the 2017 season. On 3 September, he was an unused substitute when Waterford faced Galway in the All-Ireland final. Waterford eventually lost the game by 0–26 to 2–17.

Hogan made his first appearance in the National League on 3 February 2018. He was introduced as an 18th-minute substitute in Waterford's 1–20 to 1–11 defeat by Tipperary.

== Career statistics ==
As of match played 28 November 2020.

Team	Year	National League			Munster		All-Ireland		Total	
Team	Year	Division	Apps	Score	Apps	Score	Apps	Score	Apps	Score
Waterford	2016	Division 1A	—		—		—		—	
Waterford	2017	Division 1A	0	0-00	0	0-00	0	0-00	0	0-00
Waterford	2018	Division 1A	1	0-00	0	0-00	—		1	0-00
Waterford	2019	Division 1B	4	0-03	2	0-02	—		6	0-05
Waterford	2020	Division 1A	3	1-03	0	0-00	0	0-00	3	1-03
Career total			8	1-06	2	0-02	0	0-00	10	1-08

== Honours ==
Ballygunner

- All-Ireland Senior Club Hurling Championship (2): 2022, 2026 (c)
- Munster Senior Club Hurling Championship (4): 2018, 2021, 2022, 2023
- Waterford Senior Hurling Championship (10): 2014, 2015, 2016, 2017, 2018, 2019, 2020, 2021, 2022, 2023

Waterford

- All-Ireland Under-21 Hurling Championship (1): 2016
- Munster Under-21 Hurling Championship (1): 2016
