= Brian Flannery =

Irish hurler

Personal information
- Born: Puckane, County Tipperary

Sport
- Sport: Hurling
- Position: Corner-back
Clubs
- Years: Club
- 1996– 1980s–1995: Mount Sion; Kildangan
Inter-county
Years	County	Apps (scores)
1998–2003	Waterford; Tipperary (U21); Tipperary (Minor)	14 (0–0)
Inter-county titles
- Munster titles: 1
- All-Irelands: 0
- All Stars: 0

Brian Flannery (born 1974) is an Irish hurler who presently plays with Mount Sion GAA at club level and formerly with Waterford at inter-county level.

Flannery is originally from the North Tipperary village of Puckane but moved to Waterford in 1996 and started to play for Mount Sion GAA. Brian originally played with his local team, Kildangan GAA in County Tipperary.

As well as having represented Waterford GAA at Senior Inter-County level, Brian also represented his home county of Tipperary at Minor and Under-21 level having won the All-Ireland Under 21 Hurling Championship with them in 1995.

His key achievement with Waterford GAA was winning the Munster Senior Hurling Championship in 2002.

== Honours ==
- Munster Senior Hurling Championship winner – 2002
- All-Ireland Under 21 Hurling Championship winner – 1995 (with Tipperary GAA)
- Munster Under-21 Hurling Championship winner – 1995 (with Tipperary GAA)
- Munster Minor Hurling Championship winner – 1991 (with Tipperary GAA)
- Waterford Senior Hurling Championship winner – 1998, 2000, 2002.
- Waterford Junior Hurling Championship winner – 2011

== Championship Appearances ==
#	Date	Venue	Opponent	Score	Result	Competition	Match report
1	24 May 1998	Austin Stack Park, Tralee	Kerry	0–0	0–20 : 1-09	Munster Quarter-Final	Irish Independent
2	7 June 1998	Páirc Uí Chaoimh, Cork	Tipperary	0–0	0–21 : 2–12	Munster Semi-Final	Irish Independent
3	12 July 1998	Semple Stadium, Thurles	Clare	0–0	3–10 : 1–16	Munster Final	Irish Independent
4	19 July 1998	Semple Stadium, Thurles	Clare	0–0	0–10 : 2–16	Munster Final Replay	Irish Independent
5	26 July 1998	Croke Park, Dublin	Galway	0–0	1–20 : 1–10	All-Ireland Quarter-Final	Irish Independent
6	16 August 1998	Croke Park, Dublin	Kilkenny	0–0	1–10 : 1–11	All-Ireland Semi-Final	Irish Independent
7	30 May 1999	Semple Stadium, Thurles	Limerick	0–0	1–16 : 1–15	Munster Quarter-Final	Irish Examiner
8	14 June 1999	Semple Stadium, Thurles	Cork	0–0	0–24 : 1–15	Munster Semi-Final	Irish Independent
9	28 May 2000	Páirc Uí Chaoimh, Cork	Tipperary	0–0	0–14 : 0–17	Munster Quarter-Final	Irish Independent
10	10 June 2001	Páirc Uí Chaoimh, Cork	Limerick	0–0	2–14 : 4–11	Munster Semi-Final	Irish Independent
11	26 May 2002	Semple Stadium, Thurles	Cork	0–0	1–16 : 1–15	Munster Semi-Final	Irish Independent
12	30 June 2002	Páirc Uí Chaoimh, Thurles	Tipperary	0–0	2–23 : 3–12	Munster Final	Irish Examiner
13	11 August 2002	Croke Park, Dublin	Clare	0–0	1–13 : 1–16	All-Ireland Semi-Final	Irish Independent
14	11 May 2003	Walsh Park, Waterford	Kerry	0–0	2–26 : 1–12	Munster Quarter-Final	Anfearrua

Sporting positions
Preceded by Stephen Frampton	Waterford Senior Hurling Captain; 1999	Succeeded by Paul Flynn

{{Navbox | name = Waterford NHL Team 1998 | title = Waterford – [[1998 National Hurling League Runners Up | state = autocollapse | listclass = hlist | titlestyle = background:white; color:blue; | border =

| list1 =

- 1 B. Landers
- 2 T. Feeney
- 3 S. Cullinane
- 4 M. O'Sullivan
- 5 S. Frampton
- 6 F. Hartley
- 7 B. Greene
- 8 T. Browne
- 9 P. Queally
- 10 D. Shanahan
- 11 K. McGrath (c)
- 12 D. Bennett
- 13 B. O'Sullivan
- 14 A. Kirwan
- 15 P. Flynn

Substitutes
16 S. Brenner
17 B. Flannery
18 E. O'Sullivan
19 R. McGrath
20 G. Gater
21 M. White
22 J. Meaney
23 D. McGrath
24 J. O'Connor

Manager
G. McCarthy

Selectors
J. Galvin
G. Fives
S. Ahearne

}}
