= 1992 Waterford Senior Hurling Championship =

Annual hurling competition season

- Dates: 12 April 1992 – 15 November 1992
- Teams: 13
- Champions: Ballygunner (4th title); Michael Mahoney (captain)
- Runners-up: Mount Sion; Pat Ryan (captain)

The 1992 Waterford Senior Hurling Championship was the 92nd staging of the Waterford Senior Hurling Championship since its establishment by the Waterford County Board in 1897.

Lismore were the defending champions.

On 15 November 1992, Ballygunner won the championship after a 1–12 to 2–07 defeat of Mount Sion in the final. This was their fourth championship title overall and their first title since 1968.

== Results ==
=== Group A ===
==== Table ====
Advance to semi-finals Advance to quarter-finals

Team	Matches				Score			Pts
Team	Pld	W	D	L	For	Against	Diff	Pts
Ballygunner	6	4	1	1	115	73	42	9
Passage	6	4	1	1	87	71	16	9
Portlaw	6	3	1	2	77	81	−4	7
Lismore	6	3	1	2	102	81	21	7
Dungarvan	6	2	0	4	74	92	−16	4
St. Saviour's	6	1	1	4	73	109	−36	3
De La Salle	6	1	1	4	62	83	−21	3

==== Group A results ====
18 April 1992 Round 1	Lismore	0–16 – 3–07	Ballygunner	Fraher Field, Dungarvan
	M Hickey 0–4, S Daly 0–3, P Prendergast 0–3, Seamus Prendergast 0–2, B Prendergast 0–2, A Tinnelly 0–1, B Lawton 0–1.		C Sweeney 1–1, M Mahoney 1–1, B O'Sullivan 1–1, P Power 0–2, L Whitty 0–1, M O'Neill 0–1.

Round 1	Portlaw	0–13 – 2–07	St. Saviour's	Walsh Park, Waterford

Round 1	Dungarvan	0–09 – 0–05	De La Salle	Fraher Field, Dungarvan

Round 2	Passage	2–08 – 1–09	Lismore

Round 2	Portlaw	4–08 – 3–07	Dungarvan

9 May 1992 Round 2	St. Saviour's	1–07 – 3–15	Ballygunner	Walsh Park, Waterford
	T Corcoran 1–5, P Twomey 0–1.		M O'Mahoney 2–4, S Holden 1–1, M O'Neill 0–4, F Hartley 0–3, B O'Sullivan 0–2, E Brennan 0–1.	Referee: J Hunt (Clonea)

Round 3	Lismore	0–11 – 3–06	Portlaw

Round 3	Passage	1–14 – 1–06	Dungarvan

1 August 1992 Round 3	Ballygunner	3–14 – 1–08	De La Salle	Walsh Park, Waterford
	M O'Mahoney 2–2, J Warren 1–1, B O'Sullivan 0–4, P Power 0–3, R O'Sullivan 0–2, S Frampton 0–1, S Sweeney 0–1.		N Dalton 1–4, J Dalton 0–2, J Brenner 0–2.

21 June 1992 Round 4	Ballygunner	4–14 – 1–12	Passage	Walsh Park, Waterford
	M O'Mahoney 1–5, S Holden 2–1, C Sweeney 1–0, M O'Neill 0–3, P Power 0–2, B O'Sullivan 0–1, E Brennan 0–1.		M O'Keeffe 0–5, S Carey 1–0, N Connors 0–2, S Keating 0–1, A Fitzgerald 0–1, E Fitzgerald 0–1, R Corcoran 0–1.	Referee: JM Kelly (Shamrocks)

Round 4	Portlaw	1–04 – 3–08	De La Salle

Round 4	Lismore	3–18 – 2–06	St. Saviour's

Round 5	Passage	0–09 – 2–03	De La Salle

4 October 1992 Round 5	Portlaw	0–14 – 0–08	Ballygunner	Walsh Park, Waterford
	D de Paor 0–3, A Kirwan 0–2, T Larkin 0–2, P Coffey 0–2, D Foran 0–2, K Laffan 0–1, G O'Brien 0–1, D Walsh 0–1.		L Whitty 0–3, M O'Mahoney 0–1, B O'Sullivan 0–1, E Brennan 0–1, M O'Neill 0–1, S Holden 0–1.	Referee: P Walsh (Fourmilewater)

Round 5	St. Saviour's	2–05 – 2–11	Dungarvan

Round 6	De La Salle	0–08 – 1–12	Lismore

Round 6	Passage	2–10 – 1–04	St. Saviour's

11 October 1992 Round 6	Ballygunner	1–15 – 0–07	Dungarvan	Walsh Park, Waterford

Round 7	Passage	3–07 – 1–05	Portlaw

Round 7	Lismore	2–15 – 2–10	Dungarvan

Round 7	St. Saviour's	4–08 – 0–12	De La Salle

==== Group A play-offs ====
18 October 1992 Play-off	Ballygunner	3–09 – 1–08	Passage	Walsh Park, Waterford
	S Holden 2–0, M O'Mahoney 1–0, E Brennan 0–3, P Power 0–3, B O'Sullivan 0–2, S Frampton 0–1.		M O'Keeffe 0–4, P Fitzgerald 1–0, A Fitzgerald 0–3, P Connors 0–1.

18 October 1992 Play-off	Portlaw	1–13 – 2–07	Lismore	Fraher Field, Dungarvan

=== Group B ===
==== Table ====
Advance to semi-finals Advance to quarter-finals Relegated

Team	Matches				Score			Pts
Team	Pld	W	D	L	For	Against	Diff	Pts
Mount Sion	5	4	1	0	98	49	49	9
Tallow	5	3	0	2	61	62	−1	6
Ballyduff Upper	5	3	0	2	62	71	−9	6
Roanmore	5	2	1	2	68	58	10	5
Fourmilewater	5	1	1	3	55	77	−22	3
Dunhill	5	0	1	4	43	70	−33	2

==== Group B results ====
Round 1	Mount Sion	1–12 – 0–07	Dunhill	Walsh Park, Waterford

Round 1	Tallow	2–07 – 0–15	Fourmilewater	Cappoquin

Round 1	Roanmore	0–11 – 1–10	Ballyduff Upper	Fraher Field, Dungarvan

Round 2	Mount Sion	1–16 – 1–05	Fourmilewater

Round 2	Ballyduff Upper	0–05 – 1–11	Tallow

Round 2	Dunhill	0–07 – 0–12	Roanmore

Round 3	Mount Sion	0–14 – 3–05	Roanmore

Round 3	Tallow	3–07 – 0–07	Dunhill

Round 3	Fourmilewater	1–07 – 0–13	Ballyduff Upper

Round 4	Mount Sion	1–20 – 3–04	Ballyduff Upper

Round 4	Roanmore	0–08 – 1–08	Tallow

Round 4	Dunhill	0–09 – 0–09	Fourmilewater

Round 5	Dunhill	1–10 – 2–12	Ballyduff Upper

Round 5	Mount Sion	4–15 – 0–07	Tallow

Round 5	Fourmilewater	1–10 – 5–08	Roanmore

=== Knock-out stage ===
==== Quarter-finals ====
25 October 1992 Quarter-final	Tallow	5–14 – 0–11	Portlaw	Fraher Field, Dungarvan
	P Murphy 2–5, Dermot Henley 2–4, Paul Curley 1–0, M Beecher 0–2, M Curley 0–2, David Henley 0–1.		T Larkin 0–6, D Foran 0–2, G Harris 0–1, D Walsh 0–1, M Walsh 0–1.	Referee: P Walsh (Fourmilewater)

25 October 1992 Quarter-final	Passage	2–17 – 1–07	Ballyduff Upper	Fraher Field, Dungarvan
	M O'Keeffe 1–5, S Carey 1–2, V Barry 0–3, S Keating 0–3, A Fitzgerald 0–2, N Connors 0–2.		P Prendergast 1–4, R Walsh 0–1, D Drislane 0–1, T Feeney 0–1.	Referee: JJ Landers (Cappoquin)

==== Semi-finals ====
31 October 1992 Semi-final	Ballygunner	2–13 – 2–07	Tallow	Fraher Field, Dungarvan
	S Holden 1–7, P Power 1–0, P Flynn 0–3, B O'Sullivan 0–1, M O'Mahoney 0–1, M O'Neill 0–1.		Philip Curley 1–1, Paul Curley 1–0, Dermot Hanley 0–3, David Hanley 0–1, P Murphy 0–1, S Curley 0–1.	Referee: M Wadding Roanmore)

31 October 1992 Semi-final	Mount Sion	0–15 – 3–06	Passage	Walsh Park, Waterford
	G Gater 0–9, Tony Browne 0–2, G Fitzpatrick 0–1, B Green 0–1, D Loughnane 0–1, P Fanning 0–1.		M O'Keeffe 1–3, V Barry 1–1, S Carey 1–0, S Keating 0–2.	Referee: JM Kelly (Shamrocks)

7 November 1992 Semi-final replay	Mount Sion	0–14 – 0–10	Passage	Walsh Park, Waterford
	G Gater 0–8, K Ryan 0–2, D Loughnane 0–2, S Ahearne 0–1, Tony Browne 0–1.		M O'Keeffe 0–6, V Barry 0–2, S Carey 0–2, S Keating 0–1.	Referee: JM Kelly (Shamrocks)

==== Final ====
15 November 1992 Final	Ballygunner	1–12 – 2–07	Mount Sion	Fraher Field, Dungarvan
	C Sweeney 1–2, P Flynn 0–5, E Brennan 0–1, M O'Mahony 0–1, S Holden 0–1, M O'Neill 0–1, B O'Sullivan 0–1.		G Gater 0–5, S Ahern 1–0, J Meaney 1–0, Tony Browne 0–1, P Fanning 0–1.	Referee: M Wadding (Roanmore)
