= Ger Harris =

Irish hurler

Personal information
- Native name: Gearóid Ó hEarchaí (Irish)
- Born: 5 January 1975 (age 51) Portlaw, County Waterford, Ireland
- Occupation: Quality manager
- Height: 6 ft 0 in (183 cm)

Sport
- Sport: Hurling
- Position: Centre-back
Clubs
- Years: Club
- Portlaw; Mount Sion
Club titles
- Waterford titles: 2
Inter-county
- Years: County
- 1993-1999: Waterford
Inter-county titles
- Munster titles: 0
- All-Irelands: 0
- NHL: 0
- All Stars: 0

Ger Harris (born 5 January 1975) is an Irish former hurler. At club level, he played for Portlaw and Mount Sion and at inter-county level with the Waterford senior hurling team.

== Career ==
Harris played hurling at all grades during his time in secondary school at De La Salle College in Waterford. He won a Munster Colleges U15AHC medal in 1990, following a 5–04 to 2–05 win over North Monastery in the final. At club level, Harris began his career with Portlaw before later lining out with Mount Sion. He won waterford SHC medals after defeats of Ballyduff Upper in 1998 and Ballygunner in 2000.

At inter-county level, Harris first played for Waterford at minor level. He was part of the Waterford team beaten by Galway in the 1992 All-Ireland minor final. Harris progressed to the under-21 team and claimed a Munster U21HC title in 1994. He later spent a number of seasons with the senior team.

== Post-playing career ==
Harris has served as secretary with the Waterford senior team under Derek McGrath, Davy Fitzgerald and Peter Queally.

== Honours ==
De La Salle College

- Munster Colleges Under-15 A Hurling Championship: 1990

Mount Sion

- Waterford Senior Hurling Championship: 1998, 2000

Waterford

- Munster Under-21 Hurling Championship: 1994
- Munster Minor Hurling Championship: 1992
