= 2016 Waterford Senior Hurling Championship =

Annual hurling competition season

- Dates: May 2016 – 23 October 2016
- Teams: 12
- Sponsor: J. J. Kavanagh & Sons
- Champions: Ballygunner (15th title); Brian O'Sullivan (captain); Denis Walsh (manager)
- Runners-up: Passage

The 2016 Waterford Senior Hurling Championship was the 116th staging of the Waterford Senior Hurling Championship since its establishment by the Waterford County Board in 1897. The championship began in May 2016 and ended on 23 October 2016.

Ballygunner were the defending champions.

On 23 October 2016, Ballygunner won the championship after a 4–20 to 1–12 defeat of Passage in the final at Walsh Park. This was their 15th championship title overall and their third title in succession.

== Results ==
=== Final ===
23 October 2016 Final	Ballygunner	4–20 – 1–12	Passage	Walsh Park, Waterford
	Pauric Mahony 1–11 (0–7f), S Power 1–1, B O’Sullivan 0–4, T O’Sullivan, B O’Keeffe 1–0 each, P Hogan 0–3, D O’Sullivan 0–1.	Report	T Connors 1–1, K Fitzgerald 0–4 (0–3f), O Connors, E Kelly 0–2 (0–1f) each, A Roche, N Connors, J Roche 0–1 each.	Referee: M O'Brien (Portlaw)
