= 2005 Waterford Senior Hurling Championship =

Annual hurling competition season

- Champions: Ballygunner (10th title); Andy Moloney (captain); John Fitzpatrick (manager)
- Runners-up: De La Salle; Eddie O'Connor (manager)

The 2005 Waterford Senior Hurling Championship was the 105th staging of the Waterford Senior Hurling Championship since its establishment by the Waterford County Board in 1897.

Mount Sion were the defending champions.

On 16 October 2005, Ballygunner won the championship after a 2–10 to 1–12 defeat of De La Salle in the final at Walsh Park. It was their 10th championship title overall and their first title since 2001.

== Results ==
=== Semi-finals ===
| 25 September 2005 Semi-final | De La Salle | 1–12 – 0–14 | Mount Sion | Walsh Park, Waterford |
| | J Quirke 1–8, L Lawlor 0–1, D McGrath 0–1, D Russell 0–1, P Nevin 0–1. | | K McGrath 0–8, E McGrath 0–2, E Kelly 0–2, K Stafford 0–1, M White 0–1. | Referee: JM Kelly (Shamrocks) |

| 2 October 2005 Semi-final | Ballygunner | 2–15 – 1–16 | Lismore | Fraher Field, Dungarvan |
| | T Power 0–9, P Flynn 2–0, G O'Connor 0–2, S O'Sullivan 0–1, C Kehoe 0–1, M Kearney 0–1, S Walsh 0–1. | | D Bennett 1–9, J Heneghan 0–5, D Howard 0–1, E Bennett 0–1. | Referee: J Hunt (Clonea) |

=== Final ===
| 16 October 2005 Final | Ballygunner | 2–10 – 1–12 | De La Salle | Walsh Park, Waterford |
| | T Power (1–4), G O'Connor (1–2), P Flynn (0–2), P Foley, Colin Kehoe 0–1) each. | Report | J Quirke (0–9), B Phelan (1–0), C Watt (0–1), K Moran (0–1), J Milan (0–1). | Referee: M Wadding (Roanmore) |
