= 1998 Waterford Senior Hurling Championship =

Annual hurling competition season

- Sponsor: Tedcastle Oils
- Champions: Mount Sion (30th title); Roy McGrath (captain); John Meaney (manager)
- Runners-up: Ballyduff Upper; Paudie Prendergast (captain); Liam Power (manager)

The 1998 Waterford Senior Hurling Championship was the 98th staging of the Waterford Senior Hurling Championship since its establishment by the Waterford County Board in 1897.

Ballygunner were the defending champions.

On 11 October 1998, Mount Sion won the championship after a 3–19 to 0–10 defeat of Ballyduff Upper in the final. This was their 30th championship title overall and their first title since 1994.

== Knockout stage ==
=== Final ===
11 October 1998 Final	Mount Sion	3-19 - 0-10	Ballyduff Upper	Walsh Park
