= 1997 Waterford Senior Hurling Championship =

Annual hurling competition season

- Champions: Ballygunner (7th title); Fergal Hartley (captain)
- Runners-up: Passage

The 1997 Waterford Senior Hurling Championship was the 97th staging of the Waterford Senior Hurling Championship since its establishment by the Waterford County Board in 1897.

Ballygunner were the defending champions.

On 19 October 1997, Ballygunner won the championship after a 2–17 to 1–14 defeat of Passage in the final. This was their 7th championship title overall and their third title in succession.

== Knockout stage ==
=== Final ===
19 October 1997 Final	Ballygunner	2-17 - 1-14	Passage	Walsh Park
