= 2015 Waterford Senior Hurling Championship =

Annual hurling competition season

- Dates: 8 May 2015 – 25 October 2015
- Teams: 12
- Sponsor: J. J. Kavanagh & Sons
- Champions: Ballygunner (14th title); David O'Sullivan (captain); Denis Walsh (manager)
- Runners-up: Tallow; Mark O'Brien (captain); Terence McSweeney (manager)
- Relegated: Lismore

Tournament statistics
- Matches played: 38
- Goals scored: 84 (2.21 per match)
- Points scored: 1079 (28.39 per match)

The 2015 Waterford Senior Hurling Championship was the 115th staging of the Waterford Senior Hurling Championship since its establishment by the Waterford County Board in 1887. The championship began on 8 May 2015 and ended on 18 October 2015.

Ballygunner were the defending champions. Affane Cappoquin entered as a promoted team from the intermediate championship.

On 18 October 2015, Ballygunner won the championship following a 0–16 to 0–12 defeat of Tallow in the final. This was their 14th championship title, their second in succession.

Lismore were relegated following a 1–18 to 1–12 defeat by De La Salle.

== Results ==
=== Group 1 ===
Pos	Team	Pld	W	D	L	For	Ag.	Diff.	Pts.
1	Ballygunner	5	4	0	1	103	68	35	8
2	Fourmilewater	5	3	0	2	79	69	10	6
3	Tallow	5	2	1	2	89	84	5	5
4	Abbeyside	5	2	0	3	85	98	−13	4
5	Ballyduff Upper	5	1	1	3	76	99	−23	4
6	De La Salle	5	1	1	3	83	97	−14	3

=== Group 2 ===
Pos	Team	Pld	W	D	L	For	Ag.	Diff.	Pts.
1	Passage	5	4	1	0	110	78	32	9
2	Dungarvan	5	4	0	1	115	85	30	8
3	Mount Sion	5	2	1	2	106	87	19	5
4	Roanmore	5	2	1	2	74	79	−5	5
5	Affane Cappoquin	5	1	0	4	74	132	−58	2
6	Lismore	5	0	1	4	83	101	−18	1

=== Relegation play-off ===
27 September 2015 Final	De La Salle	1–18 – 1–12	Lismore	Fraher Field

=== Quarter-finals ===
19 September 2015 Quarter-final	Mount Sion	0–12 – 2–12	Ballygunner	Walsh Park

19 September 2015 Quarter-final	Roanmore	1–7 – 1–12	Fourmilewater	Fraher Field

20 September 2015 Quarter-final	Passage	1–10 – 1–12	Ballyduff Upper	Fraher Field

20 September 2015 Quarter-final	Dungarvan	0–18 – 3–13	Tallow	Fraher Field

=== Semi-finals ===
4 October 2015 Semi-final	Ballyduff Upper	0–16 – 1–14	Tallow	Fraher Field

11 October 2015 Semi-final	Ballygunner	1–16 – 2–12	Fourmilewater	Fraher Field

=== Final ===
18 October 2015 Final	Tallow	0–12 – 0–16	Ballygunner	Walsh Park
				Referee: T Walsh
