= 1995 Waterford Senior Hurling Championship =

Annual hurling competition season

- Champions: Ballygunner (5th title)
- Runners-up: Mount Sion

The 1995 Waterford Senior Hurling Championship was the 95th staging of the Waterford Senior Hurling Championship since its establishment by the Waterford County Board in 1897.

Mount Sion were the defending champions.

On 15 October 1995, Ballygunner won the championship after a 3–13 to 1–17 defeat of Mount Sion in a replay of the final. This was their fifth championship title overall and their first title since 1992.

== Knockout stage ==
=== Final ===
15 October 1995 Final	Ballygunner	3-13 - 1-17	Mount Sion	Walsh Park
