= 1967 Waterford Senior Hurling Championship =

Annual hurling competition season

- Champions: Ballygunner (2nd title); Vinny Connors (captain)
- Runners-up: Ballyduff/Portlaw

The 1967 Waterford Senior Hurling Championship was the 67th staging of the Waterford Senior Hurling Championship since its establishment by the Waterford County Board in 1897.

Ballygunner were the defending champions.

The final was played on 12 November 1967 at McGrath Park in Tramore, between Ballygunner and Ballyduff/Portlaw, in what was their first ever meeting in the final. Ballygunner won the match by 2–10 to 3–05 to claim their second consecutive championship title.

== Results ==
=== Final ===
| 12 November 1967 Final | Ballygunner | 2-10- 3-05 | Ballyduff/Portlaw | McGrath Park |
