= Passage GAA =

Passage GAA may refer to:

- Passage GAA (Waterford) a sports club in Passage East, Ireland
- Passage West GAA, a sports club in County Cork, Ireland
