= 1996 Waterford Senior Hurling Championship =

Annual hurling competition season

- Champions: Ballygunner (6th title)
- Runners-up: Lismore

The 1996 Waterford Senior Hurling Championship was the 96th staging of the Waterford Senior Hurling Championship since its establishment by the Waterford County Board in 1897.

Ballygunner were the defending champions.

On 22 September 1996, Ballygunner won the championship after a 3–13 to 1–12 defeat of Lismore in the final. This was their sixth championship title overall and their second title in succession.

== Knockout stage ==
=== Final ===
22 September 1996 Final	Ballygunner	3-13 - 1-12	Lismore	Walsh Park
