= 1994 Waterford Senior Hurling Championship =

Annual hurling competition season

- Champions: Mount Sion (29th title)
- Runners-up: Passage

The 1994 Waterford Senior Hurling Championship was the 94th staging of the Waterford Senior Hurling Championship since its establishment by the Waterford County Board in 1897.

Lismore were the defending champions.

On 9 October 1994, Mount Sion won the championship after a 2–13 to 1–11 defeat of Passage in the final. This was their 29th championship title overall and their first title since 1988.

== Knockout stage ==
=== Final ===
9 October 1994 Final	Mount Sion	2-13 - 1-11	Passage	Walsh Park
