= 1968 Waterford Senior Hurling Championship =

Annual hurling competition season

- Champions: Ballygunner (3rd title)
- Runners-up: Mount Sion

The 1968 Waterford Senior Hurling Championship was the 68th staging of the Waterford Senior Hurling Championship since its establishment by the Waterford County Board in 1897.

Ballygunner were the defending champions.

On 15 September 1968, Ballygunner won the championship after a 2–10 to 3–02 defeat of Mount Sion in the final. This was their third championship title overall and their third title in succession.
