= 1899 Waterford Senior Hurling Championship =

Annual hurling competition season

- Champions: Ballydurn (1st title)
- Runners-up: Blackwater Ramblers

The 1899 Waterford Senior Hurling Championship was the second staging of the Waterford Senior Hurling Championship since its establishment by the Waterford County Board in 1897.

Ballytruckle were the defending champions.

Ballydurn won the championship after a defeat of Blackwater Ramblers in the final.
