= David O'Sullivan (hurler) =

Irish hurler

Personal information
- Born: 5 November 1988 (age 37) Ballygunner, Waterford
- Height: 6"1ft

Sport
- Sport: Hurling
- Position: Midfield
Club
- Years: Club
- 2008-present: Ballygunner
Club titles
- Waterford titles: 1
Inter-county
Years	County	Apps (scores)
2011-present	Waterford	1 (0-0)

David O'Sullivan (born 5 November 1988 in Ballygunner) is an Irish hurler who plays for both the Waterford Inter-county hurling team and the Ballygunner GAA club. His brother Brian O'Sullivan is currently also a panel member on the Waterford Senior Hurling Team. He made his championship debut against Limerick on 12 June 2011.

== Playing career ==
=== Club ===
O'Sullivan plays his club hurling with Ballygunner in Waterford. His father Tagh managed the senior team in 1998. He won his 1st County Medal in 2009.

=== College ===
O'Sullivan played college hurling for De La Salle College in Waterford. While there, he won a Harty Cups and an All-Ireland Colleges medals in 2007 co-captaining the team alongside Craig Molony.

=== Inter-county ===
O'Sullivan was named on the Waterford Senior Hurling Panel in 2011. He made his competitive debut against Cork in the 2011 National Hurling League. On 12 June 2011, he made his championship debut in Semple Stadium Thurles in the Munster Senior Hurling Championship against Limerick following the late withdrawal of Richie Foley. He started alongside his brother Brian on the day.

== Championship Appearances ==
#	Date	Venue	Opponent	Score	Result	Competition	Match report
1	12 Jun 2011	Semple Stadium, Thurles	Limerick	0-0	3-16 : 3–15	Munster Semi-final	RTE Sport
2	12 Jun 2011	Páirc Uí Chaoimh, Cork	Tipperary	0-0	7-19 : 0–19	Munster Final	RTE Sport
