= 1966 Waterford Senior Hurling Championship =

Annual hurling competition season

- Champions: Ballygunner (1st title); Tommy Hearne (captain)
- Runners-up: Mount Sion

The 1966 Waterford Senior Hurling Championship was the 66th staging of the Waterford Senior Hurling Championship since its establishment by the Waterford County Board in 1897.

Mount Sion were the defending champions.

The final was played on 13 November 1966 at Fraher Field in Dungarvan, between Ballygunner and Mount Sion, in what was their third meeting in the final overall. Ballygunner won the match by 2–06 to 2–03 to claim their first ever championship title.

== Results ==
=== Final ===
13 November 1966 Final	Ballygunner	2-06 - 2-03	Mount Sion	Fraher Field
	J Warren 1-1, L Troy 1-1, J Hearne 0-1, T Walsh 0-1, V Connors 0-1, P Gaffney 0-1.		F Walsh 1-2, L Guinan 1-0, S Greene 0-1.
