= 2014 Waterford Senior Hurling Championship =

Annual hurling competition season

The 2014 Waterford Senior Hurling Championship was the 114th staging of the Waterford Senior Hurling Championship since its establishment by the Waterford County Board in 1887. The championship began on 25 April 2014 and ended on 5 October 2014.

Passage are the defending champions, however, they were defeated in the quarter-final stages. Ballygunner won the title following a 2–16 to 0–9 defeat of Mount Sion in the final, having remained undefeated during the whole championship campaign. Ardmore were relegated having lost all their group games and the relegation play-off.

== Teams ==
=== Overview ===
All but one of the twelve teams from the 2013 championship are participated in the top tier of Waterford hurling in 2014.

Ardmore, who defeated Dunhill by 0–23 to 2–13 in the final of the intermediate championship in 2013, availed of their right to automatic promotion to the senior championship.

Similarly, Roanmore defeated An Rinn by 3–15 to 3–9 in the 2013 relegation play-off, and so An Rinn were relegated to the intermediate grade for 2014.

== Fixtures and results ==
=== Group 1 ===
Pos	Team	Pld	W	D	L	For	Ag.	Diff.	Pts.
1	De La Salle	5	4	0	1	8–77	5–57	29	8
2	Passage	5	2	2	1	8–78	6–78	6	6
3	Abbeyside	5	3	0	2	6–80	7–72	5	6
4	Lismore	5	1	2	2	9–60	8–75	−12	4
5	Fourmilewater	5	1	1	3	2–74	7–68	−9	3
6	Roanmore	5	1	1	3	6–58	6–77	−19	3

=== Group 2 ===
Pos	Team	Pld	W	D	L	For	Ag.	Diff.	Pts.
1	Ballygunner	5	5	0	0	10–109	6–60	61	10
2	Dungarvan	5	4	0	1	10–90	6–73	29	8
3	Mount Sion	5	3	0	2	7–88	7–64	24	6
4	Tallow	5	2	0	3	8–55	6–91	−30	4
5	Ballyduff Upper	5	1	0	4	4–72	10–82	−29	2
6	Ardmore	5	0	0	5	7–58	11–101	−55	0

=== Relegation play-off ===
4 September 2014 Relegation play-off	Fourmilewater	2–20 – 0–12	Ardmore

=== Quarter-finals ===
5 September 2014 Quarter-final	De La Salle	1–16 – 2–9	Tallow	Fraher Field

6 September 2014 Quarter-final	Dungarvan	4–10 – 2–14	Passage

14 September 2014 Quarter-final	Abbeyside	1–21 – 0–15	Mount Sion	Walsh Park

14 September 2014 Quarter-final	Ballygunner	3–20 – 2–12	Lismore	Walsh Park

=== Semi-finals ===
20 September 2014 Semi-final	De La Salle	0–16 – 2–17	Mount Sion	Walsh Park
17:30

21 September 2014 Semi-final	Dungarvan	1–12 – 0–17	Ballygunner	Fraher Field
19:00

=== Final ===
5 October 2014 Final	Mount Sion	0–9 – 2–16	Ballygunner	Walsh Park
15:30	M. O’Neill 0–7 (fs); R. Roche, I. Galgey 0–1 each.	Report	Padraic Mahony 0–10 (0–7 fs, 0–1 65); Brian O’Sullivan 2–2; JJ Hutchinson 0–2; Barry O’Sullivan and H. Barnes 0–1 each.	Attendance: 3,206; Referee: M Curran
