= Wayne Hutchinson =

Irish hurler

Sport
- Sport: Hurling
- Position: Full-Back
Club
- Years: Club
- Ballygunner (hurling) Gaultier (football)
Club titles
- All-Ireland Titles: 0
Inter-county
Years	County	Apps (scores)
2011-present	Waterford	1 (0-00)
Inter-county titles
- Munster titles: 0
- All-Irelands: 0
- NHL: 0
- All Stars: 0

Wayne Hutchinson is an Irish sportsperson. He plays hurling with his local club Ballygunner and has been a member of the Waterford senior inter-county team since 2011, making his Championship debut against Limerick on 12 June 2011, starting at full back.
