= Eoin Kelly (Waterford hurler) =

Irish hurler (born 1982)

Personal information
- Native name: Eoin Ó Ceallaigh (Irish)
- Born: 24 September 1982 (age 44) Waterford, Ireland
- Height: 6 ft 2 in (188 cm)

Sport
- Sport: Hurling
- Position: Full-forward
Clubs
- Years: Club
- 1999–2006 2007–present: Mount Sion; Passage
Club titles
- Waterford titles: 5
- Munster titles: 1
Inter-county*
Years	County	Apps (scores)
2001–2012	Waterford	46 (14–190)
Inter-county titles
- Munster titles: 4
- All-Irelands: 0
- NHL: 1
- All Stars: 2
- *Inter County team apps and scores correct as of 22:59, 31 August 2012.

Eoin Kelly (born 24 September 1982) is an Irish hurler who played as a full-forward at senior level for the waterford county team. He joined the team in 2001 and was a regular member of the starting fifteen until his retirement in 2012.

Kelly is one of Waterford's top championship scorers of all time. He has won four Munster winners' medals and one National League winners' medal. He ended up as an All-Ireland runner-up on one occasion.

At club level Kelly is a Munster medalist with Mount Sion. In addition to this he has also won five county club championship medals. He currently plays club hurling with Passage.

Kelly has a number of personal achievements. He has won two All-Star awards and was included on the GPA Gaelic Team of the Year in 2008. That same year he was one of three nominees for Hurler of the Year.

== Playing career ==
=== Club ===
Kelly plays his club hurling with Passage, however, it was with the Mount Sion club in Waterford city that he enjoyed his greatest success.

In 1999 Kelly was still a minor when he lined out in his first county club championship. As reigning champions Mount Sion surrendered their title to Ballygunner.

The club were back the following year to exact revenge. A 1–20 to 0–9 defeat of Ballygunner gave Kelly a first county championship medal.

Mount Sion surrendered their club title in 2001, however, Kelly's side were back in the final again in 2002. A 1–19 to 2–14 defeat of Ballygunner secured the championship once again. It was the first of three county final victories in-a-row over Ballygunner.

In 2002 Kelly won a Munster club medal as Mount Sion defeated Sixmilebridge to take the title. The club was defeated in the subsequent All-Ireland semi-final.

Four club titles in-a-row proved beyond Mount Sion, however, the club bounced back in 2006 with Kelly winning a fifth county championship medal following a seven-point defeat of Ballygunner.

By 2007 Kelly was playing with Passage. In his debut year with the team he captured a county intermediate championship medal following a 2–16 to 1–13 defeat of Dungarvan.

=== Inter-county ===
Kelly joined the Waterford senior team during the 2001 National Hurling when he started in a group stage game against Derry, however, he played no part in the subsequent championship.

The following year Kelly made his championship debut in a Munster semi-final victory over Cork. He later claimed his first Munster winners' medal as Waterford defeated Tipperary by 2–23 to 3–12 to claim the provincial crown for the first time in thirty-nine years.

After surrendering the Munster title to Cork in 2003, Kelly's side were back in the provincial showpiece for a third successive year in 2004. In the Munster final, Waterford defeated Cork for the first time in forty-five years to take the title by 3–16 to 1–21.

In 2007 Kelly added a National Hurling League medal to his collection when Waterford defeated Kilkenny by 0–20 to 0–18 in the final. He later claimed a third Munster winners' medal as Waterford defeated Limerick by 3–17 to 1–14 in the provincial decider. While Waterford were viewed as possibly going on and winning the All-Ireland title for the first time in almost half a century, Limerick ambushed Kelly's side in the All-Ireland semi-final.

2008 began poorly for Waterford as the team lost their opening game to Clare as well as their manager Justin McCarthy. In spite of this poor start Kelly's side reached the All-Ireland final for the first time in forty-five years. Kilkenny provided the opposition and went on to defeat Waterford by 3–30 to 1–13 to claim a third All-Ireland title in-a-row.

Kelly lined out in a sixth Munster final in 2010 with Cork providing the opposition. A 2–15 apiece draw was the result on that occasion, however, Waterford went on to win the replay after an extra-time goal by Dan Shanahan. It was a fourth Munster winners' medal for Kelly, a record that he shares with five other Waterford players.

At the start of 2012 Kelly was dropped from the Waterford panel by new manager Michael Ryan. It was claimed that his fitness and commitment to the squad did not meet the requirements of the new management team. After a period in exile Kelly returned to the panel for the latter stages of the National League. The year eventually ended without any silverware for Waterford and Kelly decided to retire from inter-county hurling.

=== Inter-provincial ===
Kelly was a regular on the Munster team during numerous campaigns in the Interprovincial Championship. He captured two winners' medals in this competition.

== Career statistics ==
Team	Year	National League			Munster		All-Ireland		Total	
Team	Year	Division	Apps	Score	Apps	Score	Apps	Score	Apps	Score
Waterford	2001	Division 1B	3	0-01	0	0-00	0	0-00	3	0-01
Waterford	2002	Division 1A	2	0-01	2	0-03	1	0-04	5	0-08
Waterford	2003	Division 1A	4	3–10	4	0-07	1	0-00	9	3–17
Waterford	2004	Division 1A	6	0–10	3	1–11	1	0-01	10	1–22
Waterford	2005	Division 1A	8	2–37	1	0-06	4	0-06	13	2–49
Waterford	2006	Division 1A	5	0–15	0	0-00	4	1–10	9	1–25
Waterford	2007	Division 1A	8	1–61	2	1-09	3	0–11	13	2–81
Waterford	2008	Division 1A	6	2–29	0	0-00	5	7–43	11	9–72
Waterford	2009	Division 1	6	2–30	3	1–25	2	1–21	11	4–76
Waterford	2010	Division 1	5	4–47	3	1–22	1	0-05	9	5–74
Waterford	2011	Division 1	3	0-00	2	0-00	2	0-04	7	0-04
Waterford	2012	Division 1A	2	0-01	2	1-01	0	0-00	4	1-01
Total			58	14–242	22	5–84	24	9–76	104	28–402

== Honours ==
=== Team ===
Passage

- Waterford Senior Hurling Championship (1): 2013
- Waterford Intermediate Hurling Championship (1): 2007

Mount Sion

- Munster Senior Club Hurling Championship (1): 2002
- Waterford Senior Hurling Championship (5): 2000, 2002, 2003, 2004, 2006

Waterford

- Munster Senior Hurling Championship (4): 2002, 2004, 2007, 2010
- National Hurling League (1): 2007

Munster

- Interprovincial Championship (2): 2005, 2007

Sporting positions
Preceded by Ken McGrath	Waterford Senior Hurling Captain; 2005	Succeeded by Paul Flynn
