= Fergal Hartley =

Irish hurler

Fergal Hartely
Personal information
- Native name: Fergal Ó hArtaile (Irish)
- Nicknames: Fergie, Bird
- Born: 4 February 1972 (age 54) Ballygunner, County Waterford, Ireland
- Occupation: Recruitment firm owner
- Height: 6 ft 1 in (185 cm)

Sport
- Sport: Hurling
- Position: Centre-back
Club
- Years: Club
- Ballygunner
Club titles
- Waterford titles: 8
- Munster titles: 1
Inter-county*
Years	County	Apps (scores)
1992–2006	Waterford	26 (0-00)
Inter-county titles
- Munster titles: 1
- All-Irelands: 0
- NHL: 0
- All Stars: 1
- *Inter County team apps and scores correct as of 19:34, 8 October 2014.

Fergal Hartley (born 4 February 1972) is an Irish retired hurler who played as a centre-back for the Waterford senior team.

Born in Ballygunner, County Waterford, Hartley first played competitive hurling during his schooling at De La Salle College. He arrived on the inter-county scene when he first linked up with the Waterford minor team, before later joining the under-21 side. He made his senior debut during the 1993 championship. Hartley went on to enjoy a lengthy career and won one Munster medal.

Hartley was a member of the Munster inter-provincial team on a number of occasions. At club level he is a one-time Munster medallist with Ballygunner. In addition to this Hartley has also won eight championship medals.

Throughout his career Hartley made 26 championship appearances for Waterford. After retiring from inter-county hurling in July 2003, he returned to inter-county activity for one more campaign in 2005. Hartley retired for the second time on 10 January 2006.

In retirement from playing Hartley became involved in team management and coaching. He spent two years as manager of the Waterford under-21 team, Hartley later took charge of the Ballygunner senior team.

== Playing career ==
=== Club ===
Hartley played his club hurling with the Ballygunner club in Waterford and has enjoyed much success.

In 1992 Hartley won his first county club championship medal following a 1–12 to 2–7 defeat of Mount Sion. It was the club's first title in twenty-four years.

Ballygunner surrendered their club title the following year, but were back in the final again in 1995 to face Mount Sion. Hartley won his second championship medal that year following a draw and a replay. It was the first of three county final victories in-a-row for Ballygunner, defeating Lismore in 1996 and Passage in 1997.

Four club titles in-a-row proved beyond Ballygunner, however, the club bounced back in 1999 with Hartley winning a fifth county championship medal following a five-point defeat of old rivals Mount Sion.

After a defeat by Mount Sion in the championship decider in 2000, Hartley secured a sixth championship medal in 2001 when Ballygunner accounted for Lismore. He later claimed a Munster winners' medal after his club accounted for Blackrock in the provincial final.

After the high of winning the provincial title Ballygunner went on to lose three club championship finals in succession. They broke this unenviable record at the fourth attempt with Hartley winning a seventh county championship medal following a 2–10 to 1–12 defeat of De La Salle.

Ballygunner lost two further finals in succession before Hartley won his eight championship medal in 2009 following a one-point defeat of Lismore after a draw and a replay.

=== Inter-County ===
Hartley first came to prominence on the inter-county scene as a member of the Waterford under-21 teams. In 1992 he won a Munster medal in that grade before later lining out in the All-Ireland final. Offaly provided the opposition on that occasion, however, the game ended in a draw. The replay saw Waterford take the title by 0–12 to 2–3 and Hartley collected an All-Ireland under-21 medal.

Flynn's performances at underage levels brought him to the attention of the senior selectors and he made his senior debut in the 1993 championship. It was a less than auspicious start to Hartley's hurling career as Waterford were defeated by the minnows of Kerry in the opening round of the Munster championship. It was one of the lowest points in Waterford hurling.

In 1998 Hartley played in his first Munster final in the senior grade. Waterford held All-Ireland champions Clare to a draw in the Munster final, however, the Decies lost the replay. Hartley's side later faced Kilkenny in the All-Ireland semi-final in what would be the county's first appearance in Croke Park since 1963. Kilkenny won by a single point.

In 2002 Waterford emerged from the doldrums by reaching the Munster final once again. Hartley was captain as he collected his first Munster winners' medal as Waterford defeated reigning All-Ireland champions Tipperary by 2–23 to 3–12. It was their first provincial crown in thirty-nine years. Waterford's hurling odyssey came to an end in the All-Ireland semi-final.

After surrendering the Munster title to Cork in 2003, Hartley decided to call time on his inter-county career.

In 2005 Hartley had a change of heart and decided to return to the Waterford team for one final season. It was a disappointing year as Waterford crashed out of the early stages of the provincial championship in 2005 before facing a defeat by Cork in the All-Ireland series.

In January 2006 Hartley announced his retirement from inter-county hurling for the second time.

=== Inter-provincial ===
Hartley also unsuccessfully lined out with Munster in the inter-provincial series of games.

== Honours ==
=== Player ===
University of Limerick

- Fitzgibbon Cup (1): 1994

Ballygunner

- Munster Senior Club Hurling Championship (1): 2001
- Waterford Senior Club Hurling Championship (8): 1992, 1995, 1996, 1997, 1999, 2001, 2005, 2009

Waterford

- Munster Senior Hurling Championship (1): 2002 (c)
- All-Ireland Under-21 Hurling Championship (1): 1992
- Munster Under-21 Hurling Championship (1): 1992

=== Manager ===
Ballygunner

- Waterford Senior Club Hurling Championship (2): 2014 2017

Sporting positions
Preceded by Ken McGrath	Waterford Senior Hurling Captain; 2002	Succeeded by Tony Browne
Preceded by Shane Aherne	Waterford Under-21 Hurling Manager; 2011–2012	Succeeded by Peter Queally
