= Tony Browne (hurler) =

Waterford hurler

Personal information
- Native name: Tónaí de Brún (Irish)
- Nickname: TB
- Born: 1 July 1973 (age 53) Waterford, Ireland

Sport
- Sport: Hurling
- Position: Right wing-back
Club
- Years: Club
- Mount Sion
Club titles
- Waterford titles: 7
- Munster titles: 1
Inter-county*
Years	County	Apps (scores)
1991–2014	Waterford	65 (4–41)
Inter-county titles
- Munster titles: 4
- All-Irelands: 0
- NHL: 1
- All Stars: 3
- *Inter County team apps and scores correct as of 14:50, 10 November 2012.

Tony Browne (born 1 July 1973) is an Irish former hurler who played as a right wing-back for the Waterford senior team from 1991, until he retired from inter-county hurling in 2014.

Browne made his first appearance for the team during the 1991–92 National League and immediately became a regular member of the starting fifteen. During his inter-county career, he won four Munster medals and one National League medal. On one occasion, he ended up as an All-Ireland runner-up.

At the club level, Browne is a one-time Munster medalist with Mount Sion. In addition to this, he has won seven county club championship medals.

In addition to being the most "capped" Waterford hurler of all time, Browne has won three All-Star awards, and in 1998 he became the first Waterford player to be named All-Star Hurler of the Year. In 2009, he was chosen to be on the best Munster team of the preceding twenty-five years.

== Playing career ==
=== Club ===
Browne plays club hurling with Mount Sion and has had several successes with the club. After claiming championship medals in the minor and under-21 grades, he later became a member of the Mount Sion senior hurling team. He won his first championship medal in this grade in 1994, following a 2–13 to 1–11 defeat of Passage.

After surrendering their title in 1995, Mount Sion reached the championship decider again in 1998. Ballyduff Upper were defeated in the final, on a scoreline of 3–19 to 0–10, giving Browne his second championship medal. Mount Sion failed to retain the title in 1999, and in 2000 Browne lined out in a third successive decider. A 1–20 to 0–9 defeat of Ballygunner gave Browne a third championship medal.

Both Mount Sion and Ballygunner lined out in the county final once again in 2002, where a 1–19 to 2–14 victory gave Browne his fourth championship medal. Mount Sion subsequently reached the provincial decider where Sixmilebridge provided the opposition. A narrow 0–12 to 0–10 defeat gave Browne a Munster medal. Mount Sion retained their county championship for the first time in almost thirty years in 2003, after a 1–14 to 1–10 defeat of Ballygunner gave Browne a fifth championship medal.

In 2004, Browne won his sixth championship medal as Mount Sion pulled off a hat-trick of county final victories. The 4–14 to 4–7 defeat of Ballygunner gave Mount Sion their first three-in-a-row since 1965. Although Mount Sion was unable to achieve a four-in-a-row victory, the team qualified for the county decider once again in 2006. Ballygunner were the opponents again, and a 2–13 to 0–12 victory gave Browne a seventh championship medal.

=== Minor and under-21 ===
Browne first played with Waterford as a member of the county minor team in the late 1980s. He later joined the Waterford under-21 hurling team. In 1992, Browne was captain of the Waterford under-21 hurlers as the team reached the provincial decider. A narrow 0–17 to 1–12 defeat of Clare gave him his first Munster medal. He later led his team to Croke Park for an All-Ireland final showdown with Offaly. A 4–4 to 0–16 draw was the result on that occasion, although Waterford were more effective in the replay. A 0–12 to 2–3 victory gave Browne an All-Ireland Under-21 Hurling Championship medal, and he also had the honour of collecting the cup on behalf of the team. Two years later, Browne won a second Munster medal in the under-21 grade.

=== Senior ===
By this stage of his hurling career, Browne was already a member of the Waterford senior hurling team. He made his debut against Galway in a National League game in 1991 and became a regular member of the starting fifteen.

After a number of years in provincial hurling, Waterford qualified for the Munster final in 1998, with Browne lining out at centre field. Waterford held All-Ireland champions Clare to a draw in the decider, however Waterford lost the replay. Browne's side later faced Kilkenny in the All-Ireland semi-final in what would be the county's first appearance in Croke Park since 1963. Kilkenny won by a single point. Browne finished the season by collecting Waterford's first All-Star in sixteen years. He was also named Eircell Hurler of the Year.

In 2002, Waterford reached the Munster final once again and defeated Tipperary by 2–23 to 3–12 to their first provincial crown in thirty-nine years. It was Browne's first Munster medal. Waterford's hurling odyssey came to an end in the All-Ireland semi-final. After surrendering the Munster title to Cork in 2003, Browne's side was back in the provincial final for a third consecutive year in 2004. Waterford defeated Cork in a Munster final for the first time in forty-five years to take the title by 3–16 to 1–21. In spite of collecting its second Munster medal, an All-Ireland appearance eluded the team yet again. In 2005 and 2006, Waterford crashed out of the early stages of the provincial championship. On both these occasions, his team was defeated by Cork in the All-Ireland series. There were also rumours that Browne was quitting inter-county hurling, as he was planning to emigrate.

In 2007, Browne added a National Hurling League medal to his collection when Waterford defeated Kilkenny by 0–20 to 0–18 in the final. He later claimed a third Munster medal as Waterford defeated Limerick by 3–17 to 1–14 in the provincial decider. While Waterford were viewed as possibly winning the All-Ireland title for the first time in almost half a century, Limerick ambushed Waterford in the All-Ireland semi-final. In spite of a disappointing end to the season, Browne collected a third All-Star award. Waterford lost their opening game to Clare in 2008, and they lost their manager Justin McCarthy in the same year. Browne's side reached the All-Ireland final for the first time in forty-five years. Kilkenny provided the opposition and went on to trounce Waterford by 3–30 to 1–13 to claim a third All-Ireland title in-a-row.

Browne lined out in another Munster final in 2010 with Cork providing the opposition. A 2–15 apiece draw was the result on that occasion, with Browne scoring the equalising goal for Waterford in the final minute. Waterford went on to win the replay after an extra-time goal by Dan Shanahan. It was a fourth Munster medal for Browne, a record that he shares with five other Waterford players. Browne's last game for Waterford came at the age of 40, in the 2013 All-Ireland Senior Hurling Championship against Kilkenny on 13 July when he came on as a substitute. He announced his retirement in April 2014, saying, "To do so is always a tough decision for any athlete but I know I have been blessed in so many ways to have experienced what I have with the Waterford hurling teams over the past three decades."

=== Inter-provincial ===
Browne has also lined out for Munster in the inter-provincial series of games. After joining the panel as an unused substitute in 1994, he lined out on the starting fifteen a year later. A narrow 0–13 to 1–9 defeat of Ulster gave him his first Railway Cup medal. This win was the first part of a famous three-in-a-row for Munster. Defeats of Leinster in 1996 and 1997 gave Browne two further Railway Cup medals. Four in-a-row proved beyond Munster the following year. In 2004 Browne returned to the Munster team after a five-year absence. It was an unsuccessful campaign for the southerners, however three years later Browne won his fourth Railway Cup medal following a 2–22 to 2–19 defeat of Connacht.

== Post-playing career ==
Browne worked under Liam Cahill when Cahill managed Waterford. Browne then joined Tipperary when Cahill was appointed manager ahead of the 2023 season.

== Honours ==
=== Team ===
Mount Sion

- Munster Senior Club Hurling Championship (1): 2002
- Waterford Senior Club Hurling Championship (7): 1994, 1998, 2000, 2002, 2003, 2004, 2006

Waterford

- Munster Senior Hurling Championship (4): 2002, 2004, 2007, 2010
- National Hurling League (1): 2007
- All-Ireland Under-21 Hurling Championship (1): 1992 (c)
- Munster Under-21 Hurling Championship (2): 1992 (c), 1994

Munster

- Inter-provincial Championship (4): 1995, 1996, 1997, 2007

=== Individual ===
- All-Star Hurler of the Year (1): 1998
- All-Stars (3): 1998, 2006, 2007

Achievements
Preceded by Brian Feeney (Galway)	All-Ireland Under-21 Hurling Final winning captain 1992	Succeeded by Liam Burke (Galway)
Awards
Preceded by Jamesie O'Connor	Eircell Hurler of the Year; 1998	Succeeded by Brian Corcoran
Sporting positions
Preceded by Fergal Hartley	Waterford Senior Hurling Captain; 2003	Succeeded by Ken McGrath
