= Brian O'Sullivan (Waterford hurler) =

Irish hurler

Personal information
- Native name: Brian Ó Súilleabháin (Irish)
- Born: 1990 (age 35–36) Ballygunner, Waterford

Sport
- Sport: Hurling
- Position: Corner-Forward
Club
- Years: Club
- 2000s-present: Ballygunner
Inter-county
Years	County	Apps (scores)
2011-present	Waterford	1 (0-2)

Brian O'Sullivan (born 1990 in Ballygunner) is an Irish hurler who plays for both the Waterford Inter-county hurling team and the Ballygunner GAA club.

== Playing career ==
=== Club ===
O'Sullivan has played with Ballygunner since an early age.

=== Inter-county ===
O'Sullivan started playing inter-county hurling with Waterford at the age of 18. O'Sullivan first broke into the team during the 2011 National Hurling League. O'Sullivan made his championship debut on 12 June 2011 against Limerick GAA in the Munster Championship Semi-final at Semple Stadium, Thurles. O'Sullivan scored 2 points from play.

== Championship appearances ==
#	Date	Venue	Opponent	Score	Result	Competition	Match report
1	12 Jun 2011	Semple Stadium, Thurles	Limerick	0–2	3-16 : 3–15	Munster Semi-final	RTE Sport
