= Shane O'Sullivan (hurler) =

Irish hurler

Personal information
- Native name: Seán Ó Súilleabháin (Irish)
- Nickname: Sully
- Born: 5 November 1985 (age 40) Waterford, Ireland
- Height: 6 ft 0 in (183 cm)

Sport
- Sport: Hurling
- Position: Midfield/Wing Half Forward
Club
- Years: Club
- 2002–present: Ballygunner
Club titles
- Waterford titles: 13
- Munster titles: 4
- All-Ireland Titles: 1
Inter-county*
Years	County	Apps (scores)
2004–present	Waterford	29 (0–11)
Inter-county titles
- Munster titles: 2
- All-Irelands: 0
- NHL: 1
- All Stars: 0
- *Inter County team apps and scores correct as of 15:34, 3 November 2012.

Shane O'Sullivan (born 5 November 1985) is an Irish hurler who plays as a midfielder for the Waterford senior team.

O'Sullivan joined the team during the 2004 National League and immediately became a regular member of the starting fifteen. Since then he has won two Munster medals and one National Hurling League medal. O'Sullivan has ended up as an All-Ireland runner-up on one occasion.

AT club level O'Sullivan is a three-time county championship medalist with Ballygunner.

== Playing career ==
=== Club ===
O'Sullivan plays his club hurling with the Ballygunner club in Waterford and has enjoyed much success.

He made his senior debut as a sixteen-year-old in 2002 as Ballygunner started a remarkable losing streak of being defeated in three successive club championship finals. They broke this unenviable record at the fourth attempt with O'Sullivan winning his first championship medal following a 2–10 to 1–12 defeat of De La Salle.

Ballygunner lost two further finals in succession before O'Sullivan won his second championship medal in 2009 following a one-point defeat of Lismore after a draw and a replay.

After surrendering their title in 2010, Ballygunner reached the championship decider again in 2011. O'Sullivan was captain as the club recorded a facile 1–19 to 0–6 defeat of Tallow.

=== Inter-county ===
O'Sullivan began his inter-county career as a member of the Waterford minor and under-21 hurling teams, however, he had little success in these grades.

He made his senior competitive debut in the National League in 2004, before making his championship debut later that season in a Munster semi-final against Tipperary. O'Sullivan later won his first Munster medal as Waterford defeated Cork by 3–16 to 1–21 to win one of the greatest games of hurling ever played.

After returning from a serious injury that kept him out of the game for six months, O'Sullivan added a National Hurling League medal to his collection in 2007 when Waterford defeated Kilkenny by 0–20 to 0–18 in the final.

2008 began poorly for Waterford as the team lost their opening game to Clare as well as their manager Justin McCarthy. In spite of this poor start O'Sullivan's side reached the All-Ireland final for the first time in forty-five years. Kilkenny provided the opposition and went on to trounce Waterford by 3–30 to 1–13 to claim a third All-Ireland title in-a-row.

O'Sullivan lined out in another Munster final in 2010 with Cork providing the opposition. A 2–15 apiece draw was the result on that occasion, however, Waterford went on to win the replay after an extra-time goal by Dan Shanahan. It was a second Munster winners' medal for O'Sullivan.

=== Inter-provincial ===
O'Sullivan has also lined out with Munster in the inter-provincial series of games.
