= Billy O'Sullivan (hurler) =

Irish hurler (born 1968)

Personal information
- Native name: Liam Ó Súilleabháin (Irish)
- Nickname: The Dapper
- Born: 22 September 1968 (age 58) Ballygunner, County Waterford

Sport
- Sport: Hurling
- Position: Left wing forward
Club
- Years: Club
- 1985 - 2006: Ballygunner
Club titles
- Waterford titles: 105
- Munster titles: 18
Inter-county
- Years: County
- 1987 - 2000: Waterford
Inter-county titles
- Munster titles: 0
- All-Irelands: 0
- NHL: 0

Billy O'Sullivan (born 22 September 1968) is an Irish sportsman. He played hurling with his local club Ballygunner and with the Waterford senior inter-county team.

== Early life ==
Billy O'Sullivan was born in Ballygunner, County Waterford in 1968. He was educated locally and from an early age showed a great deal of interest in hurling. Billy won an U15 Munster Colleges with De La Salle College, Waterford. He played for a combined Fitzgibbon Cup teams from 1987 to 1989.

== Playing career ==
=== Club ===
Billy played his club hurling with his local Ballygunner team. He had some success at underage levels and in 1988 and 1989 he won two Under-21 County medal with the club. senior county medal with the club. Billy added senior county medals to his collection in 1992, 1995, 1996, 1997, 1999, 2001 & 2005. In 2001 he converted county medal into a Munster club hurling title. O'Sullivan won his seventh county championship title in 2005, playing in his14th senior county final. Billy also won an All-Ireland Clubs Sevens medal in 1993.

Billy still plays for Ballygunner at intermediate grade. He was elected club chairman in early 2010.

=== Inter-county ===
Billy joined the Waterford hurling team in the early 1987 and made his debut versus Kilkenny in the 1st round of the 1987 National Hurling League.

In 2000 Billy suffered a serious ankle injury against Killkenny in the national league.

Billy retired from inter-county hurling after the first round of the Munster Championship in 2000 against Tipperary.

Billy won a Railway Cup medal in 1992.

Billy is brother to the present Waterford inter-county hurler, Shane O'Sullivan.
