= Dave Bennett (hurler) =

Irish hurler (born 1977)

Personal information
- Native name: Dáithí Ó Beinéid (Irish)
- Born: 1977 (age 48–49) Lismore, County Waterford, Ireland
- Height: 5 ft 9 in (175 cm)

Sport
- Sport: Hurling
- Position: Midfield
Club
- Years: Club
- Lismore
Club titles
- Waterford titles: 1
College(s)
- Years: College
- 1996–1998 1998–1999: UCC; WIT
College titles
- Fitzgibbon titles: 2
Inter-county*
Years	County	Apps (scores)
1994–2008	Waterford	34 (0–78)
Inter-county titles
- Munster titles: 3
- All-Irelands: 0
- NHL: 0
- All Stars: 0
- *Inter County team apps and scores correct as of 17:07, 3 November 2012.

Dave Bennett (born 1977) is an Irish hurler who played as a midfielder for the Waterford senior team.

Bennett joined the team during the 1994–95 National League and was a regular member of the starting fifteen until his retirement after the 2008 championship. During that time he won three Munster winners' medals. Bennett ended up as an All-Ireland runner-up on one occasion.

At club level Bennett is a one-time county championship medalist with Lismore.

== Playing career ==
=== Club ===
Bennett plays his club hurling with the Lismore club in Waterford and has enjoyed some success.

After enjoying many victories in various juvenile and under-age grades, Bennett broke onto the senior team as seventeen-year-old. In 1993 he won a county club championship medal following a narrow 0–8 to 0–7 defeat of Passage.

=== University ===
During his studies at University College Cork, Bennett also played with the senior hurling team. In 1998 he won a Fitzgibbon Cup medal as UCC defeated the Waterford Institute of Technology (WIT) by 2–17 to 0–13.

One year later Bennett had joined the WIT hurling team during his studies there. In a reversal of the previous year WIT defeated UCC by 4–15 to 3–12. It was a second Fitzgibbon Cup medal for Bennett.

=== Inter-county ===
Bennett made his senior championship debut for Waterford in a Munster quarter-final defeat by Limerick in 1997.

In 2002 he claimed his first Munster winners' medal as Waterford defeated Tipperary by 2–23 to 3–12 to claim the provincial crown for the first time in thirty-nine years.

Two years later Waterford qualified for a third successive Munster final with Cork providing the opposition once again. Described as the game that had everything Waterford beat Cork by 3–16 to 1–21 to win one of the greatest games of hurling ever played. It was Bennett's second Munster medal.

2008 began poorly for Waterford as the team lost their opening game to Clare as well as their manager Justin McCarthy. In spite of this poor start Bennett's side reached the All-Ireland final for the first time in forty-five years. Kilkenny provided the opposition and went on to trounce Waterford by 3–30 to 1–13 to claim a third All-Ireland title in-a-row. Bennett retired from inter-county hurling following this defeat.

=== Inter-provincial ===
Bennett also lined out with Munster in the inter-provincial series of games.
