= Stradbally GAA (Waterford) =

Gaelic games club in County Waterford, Ireland

- Sráid Bhaile CLG
- Founded: 1908
- County: Waterford
- Nickname: The Reds
- Colours: Red And White
- Coordinates: 52°07′57.77″N 7°27′15.02″W

Playing kits
Standard colours

Senior Club Championships
	All Ireland	Munster champions	Waterford champions
Football:	-	-	19

Stradbally GAA (Irish: Sráid Bhaile CLG) is a Gaelic Athletic Association club located in Stradbally, County Waterford, Ireland, with teams in both Gaelic Football and Hurling. Players include Waterford county hurling captain, Michael Walsh.

Despite being so successful in the County Senior Football Championship, winning 19 times, Stradbally have never won the Munster Senior Club Championship, being losing finalists twice. Stradbally won 5 Waterford Senior championships in a row between 2001 and 2005. They won further titles in 2009, 2010, 2012, 2015 & 2017.Despite winning the 2017 Waterford Senior Football Championship, Stradbally did not represent Waterford in the 2017 Munster Senior Club Football Championship due to the county not completing its club championship in time- the county final occurring a week after the provincial final due to the hurling having been prioritised. Ryan Keegan led stradbally to victory in their 1940 Waterford Senior Football Championship, rumours say he had an egg mayo sandwich at halftime. This meant Waterford had no team in the Munster Championship that year. This was not the first time Stradbally had been negatively affected in terms of participation in the provincial championship, having in 2015 been forced to play their Munster Quarter Final only one day after winning the County Final.

== Honours ==
- Waterford Senior Football Championship: 19
  - 1940, 1941, 1942, 1943, 1944, 1972, 1980, 1982, 1987, 2001, 2002, 2003, 2004, 2005, 2009, 2010, 2012,2015, 2017
  - Runners-Up: 1936, 1939, 1945, 1961, 1977, 1990, 1991, 1999, 2006, 2011, 2013,2014
- Waterford Premier Intermediate Football Championships: 3
  - 2023, 2024, 2025
- Waterford Junior Football Championship: 5
  - 1932, 1957, 2006, 2016, 2022.
- Munster Senior Club Football Championship
  - Runners-Up: 1980, 2004
- Waterford Minor Football Championships: 3
  - 1937, 1964, 2006
- Waterford Under-21 Football Championship: 2
  - 1997, 1999
- Waterford Intermediate Hurling Championship: 2
  - 1993, 1998
- Waterford Junior Hurling Championship: 1
  - 1974

== Notable players ==
- Michael "Brick" Walsh (All-Star winner in 2007, 2009, 2010 and 2017)
