= Portlaw GAA =

Gaelic sports club in County Waterford, Ireland

Portlaw GAA Club
- Port Lách CLG
- Founded: 1887
- County: Waterford
- Colours: Blue and yellow
- Grounds: Pairc de Hindenburg
- Coordinates: 52°18′03.99″N 7°18′33.29″W

Playing kits
Standard colours

Senior Club Championships
	All Ireland	Munster champions	Waterford champions
Hurling:	-	-	6
Ladies' football:	–	–	4

Portlaw GAA is a Gaelic Athletic Association club based in Portlaw, County Waterford, Ireland. The club enters teams in both codes. Portlaw have been quite successful in hurling having won the Waterford Senior Hurling Championship on 6 occasions. They currently play both intermediate hurling and football in Waterford.

== Honours ==
- Waterford Senior Hurling Championships: 6
  - 1937, 1970(Ballyduff/Portlaw), 1971, 1973, 1976, 1977
- Waterford Intermediate Hurling Championships: 2
  - 2004, 2015, 2024
- Waterford Junior Hurling Championships: 1
  - 1935
- Waterford Minor Hurling Championships: 1
  - 1982
- Waterford Under-21 Hurling Championships: 1
  - 1984
- Waterford Intermediate Football Championships: 2
  - 2016, 2021
- Waterford Junior Football Championships:
  - 1986, 2005
- Waterford Ladies' Senior Football Championships: 4
  - 1976, 1977, 1978, 1979
