= Roanmore GAA =

Gaelic games club in County Waterford, Ireland

Roanmore GAA Club
- Ruánmhór CLCG
- Founded: 1970
- County: Waterford
- Nickname: The Sky Blues
- Colours: Light Blue and White
- Grounds: Pairc Ui Mhurchu
- Coordinates: 52°15′32.71″N 7°08′17.62″W

Playing kits
Standard colours

Senior Club Championships
	All Ireland	Munster champions	Waterford champions
Hurling:	-	-	2

Roanmore GAA (Irish: Ruánmhór) is a GAA club in Waterford City, Republic of Ireland. Formed in 1970, the club made rapid progress, achieving Senior Hurling status in 1980. The club's greatest achievement was winning back to back Waterford Senior Hurling Championships in 1989 and 1990.

The club has provided many players to the Waterford Senior Hurling Panel over the years, most notably, Noel Crowley and Kieran Delahunty. In 2010 Roanmore secured a return to the senior ranks with a victory over Ardmore in the Intermediate County final in Dungarvan.

== Honours ==
- Waterford Senior Hurling Championships: 2
  - 1989, 1990
- Waterford Premier Intermediate Football Championship : 1
  - 2023
- Waterford Intermediate Hurling Championships: 1
  - 2010
- Waterford Intermediate Football Championship : 1
  - 2022
- Waterford Junior Hurling Championships 2
  - 1980 2024
- Waterford Junior Hurling Championships – Attached 1
  - 2010
- Waterford Junior Football Championships: 2
  - 1980, 2020
- Waterford Under-21 Hurling Championships: 2
  - 1981, 1982
- Waterford Under-21 Football Championships: 1
  - 1984
- Waterford Minor Hurling Championships Division 1: 3
  - 1977, 1979, 1981
- Waterford Minor Hurling Championships Division 2: 3
  - 2010, 2016, 2021
- Waterford Minor Football Championships: 1
  - 1977
