= Ballygunner GAA =

Gaelic sports club in Waterford, Ireland

Ballygunner
- Baile Mhic Gonair
- Founded: 1954
- County: Waterford
- Nickname: Gunners
- Colours
- Grounds: James McGinn Park
- Coordinates: 52°13′37.58″N 7°03′56.33″W

Playing kits
Standard colours

Senior Club Championships
	All Ireland	Munster champions	Waterford champions
Hurling:	2	6	25

Ballygunner GAA Club is a Gaelic Athletic Association club located in Ballygunner, County Waterford, Ireland. The club is affiliated to the Waterford County Board and is exclusively concerned with the game of hurling.

== Foundation ==
Ballygunner GAA Club was founded in 1954, following a great deal of developmental work by local schoolteacher, Jimmy McGinn. He had moved to the area from Louth and decided that the children in his school should become involved in hurling. Prior to this, hurlers from the area travelled to Waterford to play for Erin's Own and Mount Sion.

== History ==
Success for the new club was instant, with Ballygunner justifying its formation by winning the Waterford MHC title in 1954. Most of this team went on to secure a first adult title in 1957, when the club won the Waterford JHC title. Ballygunner won its first Waterford SHC title in 1966, after a 2–06 to 2–03 win over roll of honour leaders Mount Sion. It was the first of three consecutive titles for the club.

After a 25-year period without senior success, as well as relegation to the Waterford IHC in 1980, Ballygunner emerged with a new team featuring Billy O'Sullivan, Fergal Hartley and Paul Flynn. The club won their fourth Waterford SHC title in 1992. Five such titles were won in the nineties, including four titles in a five-year between 1995 and 1999. The success continued into the new century, with Ballygunner winning the Munster Club SHC title in 2001, following a 2–14 to 0–12 win over Blackrock in the final. Further Waterford SHC titles were won in 2005, 2009 and 2011.

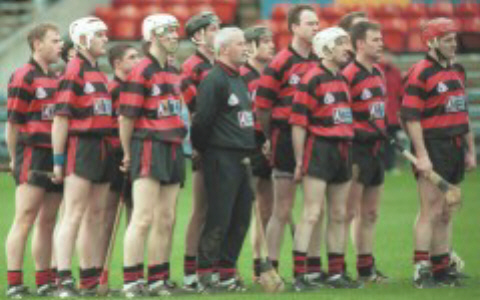
Ballygunner players before the 2001 Munster Club SHC final.

Ballygunner won their 13th Waterford SHC title in 2014, following a 2-16 to 0–09 win over Mount Sion in the final. This was the beginning of an unprecedented era of success for the club. 13 consecutive Waterford SHC titles were won between 2014 and 2026, with the club remaining undefeated in 74 consecutive championship games. Such was Ballygunner's dominance of hurling in Waterford during this period, that the club won the Waterford MHC, U21HC, PIHC and SHC titles in 2025. The club was permitted to field two teams in the 2026 Waterford SHC.

Ballygunner also dominated at provincial level during this time. After winning their second Munster Club SHC title with a defeat of Na Piarsaigh in 2018, Ballygunner became the first club to win three consecutive titles in 2023. The club won a record sixth provincial title in 2025, after a defeat of Éire Óg. In February 2022, Ballygunner became the first Waterford club to win the All-Ireland Club SHC titles, after beating Ballyhale Shamrocks by 2–17 to 1–19. The club claimed a second All-Ireland Club SHC title in 2026, when Loughrea were beaten by 1–20 to 1–14.

== Development ==
In 1994, Ballygunner GAA finally acquired a permanent playing field beside the new national school. In 1996, a two-storey clubhouse was built with two dressing rooms, toilets, a referees' changing room and a small canteen.

After 2001, it was realised that to cope with the influx of young juveniles, and to provide adequate facilities, invest was required. A development plan was put into place, with phase 1 of the project involving an extension of the clubhouse to include two new dressing rooms and a meeting/trophy room. Next was the purchasing of 8 acres (32,000 m^{2}) adjoining the current site. On this site, plans were put down for a new top-quality floodlit all-weather pitch, a hurling and handball ally, a floodlit AstroTurf and a state-of-the-art indoor hurling arena with new clubhouse facilities. For the club's 50th anniversary in 2004, the hurling ally and all-weather pitch were finished. Fencing was erected around the new field and a scoreboard was put in place for the day. Then president of the GAA, Sean Kelly, officially opened the new facilities.

Another phase of development was started in 2006, and an AstroTurf pitch was built between the old and new pitches. Construction on the largest and most expensive project ever undertaken by a Waterford club subsequently began. At a cost of approx. €1.5 million, the indoor arena would be built across from the AstroTurf. Construction began in the summer of 2008. At the current time, the main structure has been built, the astro turf floor has been laid and construction is close to completion on the adjoining pavilion.

== Manager history ==
Name	From	To	Honours
Liam Fennelly	1991	1992	
Michael Gaffney	1992	1997	4 Waterford County Senior Championships
Tadgh O'Sullivan	1998	1999	
Michael Gaffney	1999	2000	1 Waterford County Senior Championship
Gordan Ryan	2001	2003	1 Waterford County Senior Championship 1 Munster Club Senior Championship
Michael Mahoney	2004	2005	
John Fitzpatrick	2005	2006	1 Waterford County Senior Championship
Peter Queally	2007	2008	
Ger Cunningham	2009	2009	1 Waterford County Senior Championship
Niall O'Donnell	2010	2011	1 Waterford County Senior Championship
Andy Moloney	2011	2013	
Fergal Hartley	2014	2014	1 Waterford County Senior Championship
Denis Walsh	2015	2016	2 Waterford County Senior Championship
Fergal Hartley	2017	2019	2 Waterford County Senior Championship 1 Munster Club Senior Championship
Darragh O'Sullivan	2019	2025	6 Waterford County Senior Championship 3 Munster Club Senior Championship 1 All-Ireland Senior Club Hurling Championship
Jason Ryan	2025	-	1 Waterford County Senior Championship 1 Munster Club Senior Championship 1 All-Ireland Senior Club Hurling Championship

== Captain history ==
Name	From	To	Honours
Michael Mahoney	1991	1992	1 Waterford County Senior Championship
Fergal Hartley	1995	1998	3 Waterford County Senior Championships
Paul Flynn	1999	2000	1 Waterford Senior Hurling Championship
Billy O'Sullivan	2001	2002	1 Waterford County Senior Championship 1 Munster Club Senior Championship
Tom Fives	2003	2003	
Niall O'Donnell	2004	2004	
Andy Maloney	2005	2006	1 Waterford County Senior Championship
Fergal Hartley	2007	2007	
Pat Haran	2008	2008	
Alan Kirwan	2009	2009	1 Waterford Senior Hurling Championship
Shane O'Sullivan	2010	2010	1 Waterford Senior Hurling Championship
Harley Barnes & Philip Mahony	2014	2014	1 Waterford Senior Hurling Championship
Stephen O'Keeffe & Shane O'Sullivan	2018	2018	1 Waterford County Senior Championship 1 Munster Club Senior Championship

== Honours ==
- All-Ireland Senior Club Hurling Championship (2): 2022, 2026
- Munster Senior Club Hurling Championship (6): 2001, 2018, 2021, 2022, 2023, 2025
- Waterford Senior Hurling Championship (25): 1966, 1967, 1968, 1992, 1995, 1996, 1997, 1999, 2001, 2005, 2009, 2011, 2014, 2015, 2016, 2017, 2018, 2019, 2020, 2021, 2022, 2023, 2024, 2025, 2026
- Waterford Premier Intermediate Hurling Championship (1): 2025
- Waterford Intermediate Hurling Championship (2): 1984, 2022
- Waterford Junior Hurling Championship (2): 1957, 1996
- Waterford Under-21 Hurling Championship (13): 1988, 1989, 2007, 2009, 2010, 2011, 2012, 2014, 2019, 2021, 2023, 2024, 2025
- Waterford Minor Hurling Championship (16): 1954, 1992, 2002, 2006, 2007, 2009, 2010, 2015, 2017, 2018, 2019, 2020, 2021, 2023, 2024, 2025, 2026

== All-Stars ==
Year	Name	Position	County
2002	Fergal Hartley	Right wing back	Waterford
2004	Paul Flynn	Right corner forward	Waterford
2017	Stephen O'Keeffe	Goalkeeper	Waterford

== Notable players ==
- Barry Coughlan, 2021–22 All-Ireland Senior Club Hurling Championship winning captain.
- Paul Flynn All-Star winner.
- Stephen Frampton
- Fergal Hartley All-Star winner.
- Dessie Hutchinson
- Wayne Hutchinson
- Pauric Mahony
- Philip Mahony
- Stephen O'Keeffe All-Star winner.
- Billy O'Sullivan
- Brian O'Sullivan
- David O'Sullivan
- Shane O'Sullivan
