= Passage GAA (Waterford) =

Gaelic games club in County Waterford, Ireland

Passage GAA Club
- An Pasáiste
- County: Waterford
- Colours: Red and white
- Coordinates: 52°13′43″N 6°58′38″W

Playing kits
Standard colours

Senior Club Championships
	All Ireland	Munster champions	Waterford champions
Hurling:	-	-	1

Passage GAA is a hurling club based in County Waterford in Ireland. The club's grounds are in the East Waterford village of Passage East and players representing the club come from nearby areas of Dunmore East, Cheekpoint, Woodstown, Faithlegg and Ballymacaw. Passage came close a number of times to capturing the Senior hurling county title, losing three Waterford Senior Hurling Championship finals during the 1990s. Eventually, the club captured the 2013 Waterford Senior Hurling Championship, on a score line of Ballygunner 3-13 Passage 3-16, coming from 7 points down (with 7 minutes normal time remaining) to score 2-4 without reply.

== Honours ==
- Waterford Senior Hurling Championships (1): 2013 (runners-up: 1993, 1994, 2016, 2020
- Waterford Intermediate Hurling Championships (2): 1988, 2007
- Waterford Junior Hurling Championships (2): 1937, 1998
- Waterford Minor Hurling Championships (1): 2014

== All Stars ==
- Eoin Kelly - 2002, 2008
- Noel Connors 2010, 2015, 2017
