= 1897 Waterford Senior Hurling Championship =

Annual hurling competition season

- Champions: Ballytruckle (1st title)

The 1897 Waterford Senior Hurling Championship was the inaugural staging of the Waterford Senior Hurling Championship since its establishment by the Waterford County Board.

Ballytruckle won the championship.
