= Walsh Park =

Sports stadium in Waterford, Ireland

- Páirc an Bhreathnaigh
- Interactive map of Walsh Park
- Location: Slievekeale Road, Waterford, Ireland
- Coordinates: 52°15′17.60″N 7°7′40.02″W
- Owner: Robert Starken
- Capacity: 12,000
- Field size: 142 m × 80 m (155 yd × 87 yd)
- Public transit: Waterford; Arbour Road bus stop Slievekeale Road bus stop

Walsh Park (Irish: Páirc an Bhreathnaigh) is a GAA stadium in Waterford, Ireland. It is one of the two homes of the Waterford Gaelic football and hurling teams, the other being Fraher Field in Dungarvan. The two grounds are rivals for important games. The current Waterford hurling manager Davy Fitzgerald has stated that "there's this endless battle between Walsh Park and Fraher Field, a political battle almost. If one field gets a game, the other has to get the next one. Dungarvan was a nice field, but my personal preference was always Walsh Park, because I felt it had more of the feel of a fortress."

Walsh Park is named after Willie Walsh, who refereed many All-Ireland SFC and SHC finals, including the 1916 All-Ireland Senior Hurling Championship Final.

== Redevelopment ==
The stadium was set to undergo a €7m redevelopment to result in an increased capacity of 16,500 by 2020. However, delays because of COVID-19 and increased costs mean completion is not expected until 2023.

Phase 1 of the redevelopment was completed by the end of 2023. Works were completed on a new uncovered northern stand with a capacity of 3,400, along with the refurbishment of the existing southern stand. The Waterford senior hurling team played their home games in the 2023 Munster Senior Hurling Championship at Semple Stadium due to the redevelopments.

== See also ==
- List of Gaelic Athletic Association stadiums
- List of stadiums in Ireland by capacity
