= 2018 All-Ireland Senior Club Hurling Championship final =

- Event: 2017-18 All-Ireland Senior Club Hurling Championship
Cuala	Na Piarsaigh
Cuala	Na Piarsaigh
1-22	2-19
- Date: 17 March 2018
- Venue: Croke Park, Dublin
- Referee: Colm Lyons (Cork)

Replay
Cuala	Na Piarsaigh
2-17	1-17
- Date: 24 March 2018
- Venue: O'Moore Park, Portlaoise
- Referee: Paud O'Dwyer (Carlow)

The 2018 All-Ireland Senior Club Hurling Championship final was a hurling match played at Croke Park on 17 March 2018 to determine the winners of the 2017-18 All-Ireland Senior Club Hurling Championship, the 48th season of the All-Ireland Senior Club Hurling Championship, a tournament organised by the Gaelic Athletic Association for the champion clubs of the four provinces of Ireland. The final was contested by Cuala of Dublin and Na Piarsaigh of Limerick, with the game ending in a 1-22 to 2-19 draw. The replay took place on 24 March 2018, with Cuala winning by 2-17 to 1-17.

The All-Ireland final was a unique occasion as it was the first ever championship meeting between Cuala and Na Piarsaigh. Cuala were appearing in their second successive final and were hoping to retain the title, while Na Piarsaigh were lining out in their second All-Ireland decider ever and their first since 2016.

Na Piarsaigh appeared to be cruising to victory as added-time approached, but Seán Moran fired a 63rd minute free to the net to force extra-time. David Treacy came to the rescue at the death after both teams battled it out for 20 minutes of extra-time. David Breen goaled for the Limerick champions in the first period of extra-time, but points from Con O'Callaghan and Mark Schutte – both of whom had been held scoreless until then – and Treacy’s 12 frees ensured a second shot for Cuala.

The replay a week later saw Cuala take a slender 0-10 to 0-09 lead at half-time. The game turned in Cuala's favour in the 39th minute when Tommy Grimes' stray hand pass was intercepted by Nicky Kenny and punished for a goal. Mark Schutte seized possession from the puck-out and took off on a solo run down the left before slamming the ball to the net for a second. Cuala led 2-11 to 0-11 and looked to be in pole position to retain their crown, however, Na Piarsaigh were at the very best in the final quarter. Cuala surrendered a six-point lead during this period to trail Na Piarsaigh by one with 60 minutes played. Con O'Callaghan scored the point that levelled the game for the eighth time, then won a free that top scorer David Treacy converted and finally laid off a pass after a great catch for Mark Schutte to hit the insurance score for Cuala.

Cuala's victory secured their second successive All-Ireland title.

== Match details ==
=== Drawn match ===
17 March 2018
15:00

Na Piarsaigh	2-19 - 1-22 (aet)	Cuala
S Dowling 0-6 (0-4f), P Casey 1-2, D Breen 1-1, A Breen, K Downes 0-4 each, D Dempsey 0-2.	Report	D Treacy 0-12 (0-12f), S Treacy 0-3, S Moran 1-0 (1-0f), D O’Connell, J Malone, C Cronin, C Sheanon, M Schutte, C O’Callaghan, N Kenny 0-1 each.

Croke Park, Dublin
Referee: C Lyons (Cork)

=== Replay ===
24 March 2018
17:30

Na Piarsaigh	1-17 - 2-17	Cuala
A Breen, S Dowling (4f) 0-5 each, K Downes, P Casey 0-2 each. J Boylan, D Dempsey, G Brown 0-1 each.	Report	D Treacy 0-9 (7f, 1 ’65), M Schutte 1-2, N Kenny 1-0, Con O’Callaghan 0-2, D O’Connell, S Moran (f), J Sheanon, J Malone 0-1 each.

O'Moore Park, Portlaoise
Referee: P O'Dwyer (Carlow)
