= 2025–26 All-Ireland Senior Club Hurling Championship =

2024–25 season of the premier club hurling competition

All-Ireland Senior Club Hurling Championship 2024–25
Championship Details
- Dates: 2 November 2025 – 18 January 2026
- Teams: 18

All Ireland Champions
- Winners: Ballygunner (2nd win)
- Captain: Peter Hogan; Michael Mahony
- Manager: Jason Ryan

All Ireland Runners-up
- Runners-up: Loughrea
- Captain: Ian Hanrahan
- Manager: Tommy Kelly

Provincial Champions
- Munster: Ballygunner
- Leinster: St Martin’s
- Ulster: Slaughtneil
- Connacht: Loughrea

Championship Statistics
- Matches Played: 17
- Total Goals: 32 (1.88 per game)
- Total Points: 597 (35.11 per game)
- Top Scorer: Rory O'Connor (0-37)

The 2025–26 All-Ireland Senior Club Hurling Championship was the 55th staging of the All-Ireland Senior Club Hurling Championship, the Gaelic Athletic Association's premier inter-county club hurling tournament. The competition ran from 2 November 2025 to 18 January 2026.

Na Fianna were the defending champions, however, they were beaten by St Martin's in the Leinster quarter-finals. Setanta, as the first ever Donegal representatives, made their championship debut, while Éire Óg and St John's returned after long absences.

The All-Ireland final was played at Croke Park in Dublin on 18 January 2026, between Ballygunner of Waterford and Loughrea of Galway, in what was a first championship meeting between the teams. Ballygunner won the match by 1–20 to 1–14 to claim a second title.

Rory O'Connor was the championship's top scorer with 0-37.

== Team summaries ==
Team	County	Captain(s)	Manager	Most recent success		
Team	County	Captain(s)	Manager	All-Ireland	Provincial	County
Ballygunner	Waterford	Mikey Mahony; Adam Hogan	Jason Ryan	2022	2023	2024
Ballyhale Shamrocks	Kilkenny	T. J. Reid	Henry Shefflin	2023	2022	2022
Castletown Geoghegan	Westmeath	Aonghus Clarke	Alan Mangan	—	—	2024
Clough–Ballacolla	Laois	Aidan Corby	Willie Hyland	—	—	2024
Éire Óg	Clare	David Reidy	Gerry O'Connor	—	—	1990
Kilcormac–Killoughey	Offaly	Conor Slevin	Declan Laffan	—	2012	2024
Loughmore–Castleiney	Tipperary	Liam McGrath	Éamonn Kelly	—	2007	2024
Loughrea	Galway	Ian Hanrahan	Tommy Kelly	—	2006	2024
Mount Leinster Rangers	Carlow	Kevin McDonald	Paul O'Brien	—	2013	2023
Na Piarsaigh	Limerick	Jerome Boylan	Shane O'Neill	2016	2017	2023
Naas	Kildare	Brian Byrne	Tom Mullally	—	—	2024
Portaferry	Down	Matthew Conlan	Gerard McGrattan	—	2014	2024
Sarsfields	Cork	Conor O'Sullivan	Johnny Crowley	—	2024	2023
Setanta	Donegal	Mark Callaghan	Mark Marley	—	—	2022
Slaughtneil	Derry	Mark McGuigan	Paul McCormack	—	2024	2024
St John's	Antrim	Ciaran Johnston	Gerard Cunningham	—	1973	1973
St Martin's	Wexford	Conor Firman	Daithí Hayes	—	—	2024

== Leinster ==
=== Leinster quarter-finals ===
9 November 2025 Quarter-final	St Martin's (Wexford)	1-21 - 2-17	Na Fianna (Dublin)	Chadwicks Wexford Park
	R O'Connor 0-9 (0-6f), B O'Connor 1-2, J O'Connor 0-4 (0-1f), D Codd 0-2, J Firman 0-2, M Coleman 0-1, B Stafford 0-1.	Report	S Currie 1-3, C Currie 0-6 (0-3f), AJ Murphy 1-2, D Burke 0-2, B Ryan 0-2, J Meagher 0-1, M Murphy 0-1.

9 November 2025 Quarter-final	Mount Leinster Rangers (Carlow)	1-17 - 2-17	Naas (Kildare)	Netwatch Cullen Park
	C Nolan 0-7 (65 4fs), K McDonald 1-4 (sl 3fs), J Nolan 0-3, R Murphy, F Fitzpatrick, D Murphy 0-1 each.	Report	J Sheridan 1-8 (4fs), S Leacy 0-4, C Sheridan 1-0, B Byrne 0-2, F O’Sullivan, K Harrington, C Boran 0-1

9 November 2025 Quarter-final	Ballyhale Shamrocks (Kilkenny)	0-25 - 1-18	Kilcormac–Killoughey (Offaly)	UPMC Nowlan Park
	TJ Reid (0-12, 11 frees); E Cody (0-5); A Mullen (0-3); P Mullen (0-2); N Shortall, E Kenneally, R Corcoran (0-1 each).	Report	A Screeney (1-5, 1-0 pen, 0-4 frees); C Slevin (0-4, frees); C Mitchell (0-3); D Hand, J Screeney, J Gorman, C Mahon, L Kavanagh, C Walsh (0-1 each).

9 November 2025 Quarter-final	Clough–Ballacolla (Laois)	2-16 - 0-20	Castletown Geoghegan (Westmeath)	Laois Hire O'Moore Park
	S Bergin 0-9 (eight frees, one 65), W Dunphy 2-0, L Cleere 0-2, C Dunne 0-2, R Phelan 0-1, A Corby 0-1, P Brennan 0-1.	Report	N O'Brien 0-11 (nine frees), M Heeney 0-3, D O'Reilly 0-2, C Murphy 0-1, M Gavigan 0-1, J Gallagher 0-1, P Clarke 0-1.

=== Leinster semi-finals ===
23 November 2025 Semi-final	St Martin's (Wexford)	0-21 - 0-11	Naas (Kildare)	Chadwicks Wexford Park
	R O'Connor 0-14 (9f, 2 65), J O'Connor 0-3 (0-1 s/l), B O'Connor 0-1, D O'Leary 0-1, A Maddock 0-1, M Coleman 0-1.	Report	J Sheridan 0-8 (0-5f, 0-2 65), M Purcell 0-1, C Boran 0-1, B Byrne 0-1

23 November 2025 Semi-final	Ballyhale Shamrocks (Kilkenny)	1-18 - 1-15	Clough–Ballacolla (Laois)	UPMC Nowlan Park
	TJ Reid 0-10 (9fs and 1 '65); N Shortall 1-0; E Cody, R Corcoran 0-2 each; D Corcoran, B Cody, E Shefflin, E Kenneally 0-1 each	Report	S Bergin 0-6 (6fs); W Dunphy 0-4; L Conway 1-0; A Corby, K Dunne 0-2 each; L Cleere 0-1

=== Leinster final ===
6 December 2025 Final	St Martin's (Wexford)	0-24 - 2-17	Ballyhale Shamrocks (Kilkenny)	Croke Park
	R O'Connor 0-11 (0-8f), J O'Connor 0-6, M Coleman 0-2, D Codd 0-2, B O'Connor 0-1, J Barrett 0-1, B Stafford 0-1.	Report	TJ Reid 0-6 (0-5f), E Cody 1-2, N Shortall 1-2, B Cody 0-2, R Reid 0-2, E Shefflin 0-1, P Mullen 0-1, D Mason 0-1.	Referee: Chris Mooney (Dublin)

== Munster ==
The draw for the Munster Club Championship took place on 31 July 2025.

=== Munster quarter-finals ===
2 November 2025 Quarter-final	Na Piarsaigh (Limerick)	0-15 - 0-18	Ballygunner (Waterford)	TUS Gaelic Grounds
	K Downes (0-6, 4 frees, 1 65); R Lynch (0-3, 2 frees); P Casey (0-3); A Breen, T Grimes, C Boylan (0-1 each).	Report	D Hutchinson ( 0-5, 3 frees, 1 65); P Fitzgerald (0-4, 1 65); H Ruddle (0-3); M Hartley, M Mahony (0-2 each); P Hogan, C Tobin (0-1 each).

=== Munster semi-finals ===
16 November 2025 Semi-final	Éire Óg (Clare)	2-20 - 1-16 (aet)	Loughmore–Castleiney (Tipperary)	O'Garney Park
	D Russell (1-14, 0-12 frees, 0-1 65); D Moroney (1-0); S O’Donnell, M Cleary (0-2 each); R Mulcahy (free), T Kavanagh (0-1 each).	Report	J McGrath (0-12, 5 frees, 2 65s); L McGrath (1-0); J Ryan, B McGrath, N McGrath, E Connolly (0-1 each).

16 November 2025 Semi-final	Ballygunner (Waterford)	4-18 - 2-17	Sarsfields (Cork)	Walsh Park
	Pauric Mahony 0-10 (0-9 f, 0-1 65), D Hutchinson 2-1, P Fitzgerald 1-2 (0-1 f), K Mahony 1-1, M Mahony, M Hartley 0-2 each.	Report	D Hogan 2-3f (0-2 f), C McCarthy 0-5 (0-3 f), J Sweeney 0-4, B O’Flynn 0-2, C O’Sullivan, L Elliott, B Graham (0-1 f) 0-1 each.

=== Munster final ===
30 November 2025 Final	Ballygunner (Waterford)	0-21 - 1-09	Éire Óg (Clare)	FBD Semple Stadium
	D Hutchinson (0-7); Pauric Mahony (0-5, 4 frees); P Fitzgerald (0-4, 1 free); P Hogan (0-3); C Sheahan, M Mahony (0-1 each).	Report	D Russell (1-6, 1-0 pen, 0-6 frees); D Moroney, S O’Donnell, O Cahill (0-1 each).	Referee: A Tierney (Tipperary)

== Ulster ==
The draw for the Ulster Club Championship took place on 5 August 2025.

=== Ulster semi-finals ===
15 November 2025 Semi-final	Setanta (Donegal)	0-12 - 3-20	St John's (Antrim)	Owenbeg Centre of Excellence
	G Gilmore 0-8 (8fs), D Cullen 0-2, B Lafferty 0-1, R Coyle 0-1.	Report	O McManus 0-12 (9fs), D Nugent 0-2 (1f), E McGurk 0-1, M Dudley 0-1, Conall Bohill 0-1 Conor Johnston 2-0, S Shannon 0-3 (1f), D Carson 1-0

16 November 2025 Semi-final	Slaughtneil (Derry)	1-23 - 1-18	Portaferry (Down)	BOX-IT Athletic Grounds
	S Cassidy 0-11 (10f), Shane McGuigan 0-3, G Bradley 1-0, R Ó Mianáin, Chrissy McKaigue, B Rogers 0-2 each, C O’Doherty 0-1f, Sé McGiugan and J McGuigan 0-1 each	Report	C Coleman 0-10 (7f), D Sands 1-2, N Fitzsimmons 0-4, N Rogers and B Trainor 0-1 each

=== Ulster final ===
29 November 2025 Final	St John's (Antrim)	0-10 - 0-23	Slaughtneil (Derry)	BOX-IT Athletic Grounds
	O MacManus (0-9, 7f), S Wilson (0-1).	Report	C O'Doherty (0-10, 9f); S Cassidy (0-3, 2f), B Rogers (0-2), C McKaigue (0-2), Se McGuigan (0-2), E Cassidy (0-1); C O Mianain (0-1), Shane McGuigan (0-1), P Burke (0-1).	Referee: P Owens

== Semi-finals ==
21 December 2025 Semi-final	Loughrea (Galway)	2-22 - 0-15	Slaughtneil (Derry)	Parnell Park
13:30 IWT (UTC±0)	T Killeen 0-6 (0-4f), A Burns 1-1, V Morgan 1-1, J Ryan 0-3 (0-1 s/l), N Keary 0-3, C Killeen 0-2, M McManus 0-2, S Morgan 0-2 (2f), K Hanrahan 0-1, C Killeen 0-1.	Report	S Cassidy 0-8 (0-7f), C McKaigue 0-2, R O Mianain 0-2, C McAllister 0-1, M McGuigan 0-1, E Cassidy 0-1.

21 December 2025 Semi-final	Ballygunner (Waterford)	0-19 - 0-10	St Martin's (Wexford)	FBD Semple Stadium
15:30 IWT (UTC±0)	P Mahony 0-7 (0-5f), D Hutchinson 0-7 (0-1f), M Hartley 0-1, H Ruddle 0-1, P Hogan 0-1, P Fitzgerald 0-1, M Mahony 0-1.	Report	J Barrett 0-3, R O’Connor 0-3 (0-3f), J O’Connor 0-2 (0-1f), Darren Codd 0-1, David Codd 0-1.

== Final ==
18 January 2026 Final	Loughrea (Galway)	1-14 - 1-20	Ballygunner (Waterford)	Croke Park
13:30 IWT (UTC±0)	T Killeen (0-6, 0-6 frees); D Shaughnessy (1-1); J Ryan (0-2); J Coen, I Hanrahan, A Burns, V Morgan, N Keary (0-1 each).	Report	Pauric Mahony (0-8, 0-6 frees, 0-2 ‘65); K Mahony (0-4); M Mahony (1-1); C Sheahan, P Fitzgerald (0-2 each); D Hutchinson, P Hogan, M Hartley (0-1 each).	Referee: C Mooney (Dublin)

== Championship statistics ==
=== Top scorers ===
Rank	Player	Club	Tally	Total	Matches	Average
1	Rory O'Connor	St Martin's	0-37	37	4	9.25
2	Pauric Mahony	Ballygunner	0-30	30	4	7.50
3	T. J. Reid	Ballyhale Shamrocks	0-28	28	3	9.33
4	Dessie Hutchinson	Ballygunner	2-21	27	5	5.40
5	Danny Russell	Éire Óg	2-20	26	2	13.00
6	Shéa Cassidy	Slaughtneil	0-22	22	3	7.33
7	Oisín MacManus	St John's	0-21	21	2	10.50
8	Jack Sheridan	Naas	1-16	19	2	9.50
9	Patrick Fitzgerald	Ballygunner	1-13	16	5	3.20
10	Stephen Bergin	Clough–Ballacolla	0-15	15	2	7.50
10	Jack O'Connor	St Martin's	0-15	15	4	3.75

In a single game

Rank	Player	Club	Tally	Total	Opposition
1	Danny Russell	Éire Óg	1-14	17	Loughmore–Castleiney
2	Rory O'Connor	St Martin's	0-14	14	Naas
3	Oisín MacManus	St John's	0-12	12	Setanta
3	T. J. Reid	Ballyhale Shamrocks	0-12	12	Kilcormac–Killoughey
3	John McGrath	Loughmore–Castleiney	0-12	12	Éire Óg
6	Jack Sheridan	Naas	1-08	11	Mount Leinster Rangers
6	Rory O'Connor	St Martin's	0-11	11	Ballyhale Shamrocks
6	Niall O'Brien	Castletown Geoghegan	0-11	11	Clough–Ballacolla
6	Shéa Cassidy	Slaughtneil	0-11	11	Portaferry
10	Pauric Mahony	Ballygunner	0-10	10	Sarsfields
10	Cormac O'Doherty	Slaughtneil	0-10	10	St John's
10	T. J. Reid	Ballyhale Shamrocks	0-10	10	Clough–Ballacolla
10	Cathal Coleman	Portaferry	0-10	10	Slaughtneil

=== Miscellaneous ===
- Ballygunner became the first team to win six Munster Club Championship titles.
- St Martin's won the Leinster Club Championship title for the first time.

== See also ==
- 2025–26 All-Ireland Senior Club Football Championship
