= Mark Schutte =

Irish hurler (born 1991)

Personal information
- Native name: Marc Schutte (Irish)
- Born: 30 December 1991 (age 34) Killiney, Dublin, Ireland
- Occupation: Accountant
- Height: 6 ft 4 in (193 cm)

Sport
- Football Position: Left wing forward
- Hurling Position: Full forward
Club
- Years: Club
- Cuala
Club titles
	Football	Hurling
Dublin titles	0	5
Leinster titles	0	2
All-Ireland titles	0	2
College
- Years: College
- Dublin Institute of Technology
College titles
- Fitzgibbon titles: 0
Inter-county*
Years	County	Apps (scores)
2013–2016, 2019–2022 2017–2018	Dublin hurlers Dublin footballers	18 (3-11); 2 (0-01)
Inter-county titles
	Football	Hurling
Leinster Titles	2	1
All-Ireland Titles	2	0
League titles	0	0
All-Stars	0	0
- *Inter County team apps and scores correct as of 13:37, 5 July 2021.

Mark Schutte (born 30 December 1991) is an Irish hurler who plays for Dublin Senior Championship club Cuala and at inter-county level with the Dublin senior hurling team. He currently lines out as a forward.

== Career ==
A dual player at club and county levels, Schutte lined out at full-forward when the Cuala club won consecutive All-Ireland Club Championship titles in 2017 and 2018. He has also won two Leinster Club Championship titles and five County Championship titles. At inter-county level, Schutte won Leinster Championship medals in the minor and under-21 grades in both codes before winning an All-Ireland Under-21 Championship with the under-21 footballers. A brief spell with the Dublin senior football team was soon followed by inclusion on the Dublin senior hurling team. Schutte was recalled to the football squad for a further two seasons, winning consecutive All-Ireland Championship titles as a member of the extended panel in 2017 and 2018. He has also won Leinster Championship medals in both codes. His brother, Paul Schutte, has also played for Dublin.

== Honours ==
Cuala

- All-Ireland Senior Club Hurling Championship: 2017, 2018
- Leinster Senior Club Hurling Championship: 2016, 2017
- Dublin Senior Hurling Championship: 2015, 2016, 2017, 2019, 2020

Dublin

- All-Ireland Senior Football Championship: 2017, 2018
- Leinster Senior Football Championship: 2017, 2018
- Leinster Senior Hurling Championship: 2013
- All-Ireland Under-21 Football Championship: 2012
- Leinster Under-21 Football Championship: 2012
- Leinster Under-21 Hurling Championship: 2011
- Leinster Minor Football Championship: 2009
