= Aaron O'Neill =

Irish hurler (born 2004)

Personal information
- Native name: Aron Ó Néill (Irish)
- Born: 2005 (age 20–21) Waterford, Ireland

Sport
- Sport: Hurling
- Position: Right corner-back
Club
- Years: Club
- 2023-present: Ballygunner
Club titles
- Waterford titles: 3
- Munster titles: 2
- All-Ireland Titles: 1
Inter-county
- Years: County
- 2026-: Waterford
Inter-county titles
- Munster titles: 0
- All-Irelands: 0
- NHL: 0
- All Stars: 0

Aaron O'Neill (born 2005) is an Irish hurler. At club level, he plays with Ballygunner and at inter-county level with the Waterford senior hurling team.

== Career ==
O'Neill played hurling at all grades, including the Dr Harty Cup, during his time as a student at De La Salle College in Waterford. He also played hurling at juvenile and underage levels with the Ballygunner club, before progressing to the senior team in 2023. Since then, O'Neill has won three consecutive Waterford SHC medals. He has also won two Munster Club SHC medals and was at corner-back when Ballygunner beat Loughrea in the 2026 All-Ireland Club SHC Final.

At inter-county level, O'Neill first played for Waterford as a member of the minor team beaten by Cork in the 2021 Munster MHC final. He later progressed to the under-20 team and captained the team in 2024 and 2025. O'Neill made his senior team debut during the 2026 National League.

== Career statistics ==
As of 8 February 2026

Team	Year	National League			Munster		All-Ireland		Total	
Team	Year	Division	Apps	Score	Apps	Score	Apps	Score	Apps	Score
Waterford	2026	Division 1A	1	0-00	0	0-00	0	0-00	1	0-00
Career total			1	0-00	0	0-00	0	0-00	1	0-00

== Honours ==
Ballygunner

- All-Ireland Senior Club Hurling Championship: 2026
- Munster Senior Club Hurling Championship: 2023, 2025
- Waterford Senior Hurling Championship: 2023, 2024, 2025

Sporting positions
Preceded by Joe Booth; Conor Keane	Waterford under-20 hurling team captain 2024-2025	Succeeded by Vacant
