= 2022–23 All-Ireland Senior Club Hurling Championship =

All-Ireland Senior Club Hurling Championship 2022–23
Championship Details
- Dates: 6 November 2022 – 22 January 2023
- Teams: 17

All Ireland Champions
- Winners: Ballyhale Shamrocks (9th win)
- Captain: Ronan Corcoran
- Manager: Pat Hoban

All Ireland Runners-up
- Runners-up: Dunloy
- Captain: Paul Shiels & Ryan Elliott
- Manager: Gregory O'Kane

Provincial Champions
- Munster: Ballygunner
- Leinster: Ballyhale Shamrocks
- Ulster: Dunloy
- Connacht: St Thomas'

Championship Statistics
- Matches Played: 16
- Total Goals: 42 (2.62 per game)
- Total Points: 553 (34.56 per game)
- Top Scorer: T. J. Reid (2–29); Pauric Mahony (0–35)

The 2022–23 All-Ireland Senior Club Hurling Championship was the 52nd staging of the All-Ireland Senior Club Hurling Championship, the Gaelic Athletic Association's premier inter-county club hurling tournament. The draws for the respective provincial championships took place at various stages between June and September 2022. The competition ran from 6 November 2022 until 22 January 2023.

The defending champion was Ballygunner of Waterford; however, that club lost to Ballyhale Shamrocks in the All-Ireland semi-final. Ferns St Aidan's and Shinrone made their championship debuts, while Kilruane MacDonaghs and St Finbarr's returned after long absences.

The final was played at Croke Park in Dublin on 22 January 2023, between Ballyhale Shamrocks of Kilkenny and Dunloy Cúchullains of Antrim, in what was a first championship meeting between the teams. Ballyhale Shamrocks won the match by 1–22 to 1–15 to claim a ninth title, as well as a first title in three years and a third title in four championships.

T. J. Reid and Pauric Mahony were the competition's joint top scorers.

== Team summaries ==
Team	County	Captain(s)	Manager	Most recent success			
Team	County	Captain(s)	Manager	All-Ireland	Provincial	County	Source
Ballyea	Clare	James Murphy	Robbie Hogan		2016	2021	
Ballygunner	Waterford	Dessie Hutchinson; Ian Kenny	Darragh O'Sullivan	2022	2021	2021	
Ballyhale Shamrocks	Kilkenny	Ronan Corcoran	Pat Hoban	2020	2021	2021	
Castletown-Geoghegan	Westmeath	Niall O'Brien	Alan Mangan			2017	
Clough–Ballacolla	Laois	Stephen Maher	Declan Laffan			2021	
Dunloy Cúchullains	Antrim	Paul Shiels	Gregory O'Kane		2009	2021	
Ferns St Aidan's	Wexford	Declan Byrne	Pat Bennett				
Kilmacud Crokes	Dublin	Caolán Conway	Kieran Dowling			2021	
Kilruane MacDonagh's	Tipperary	Jerome Cahill	Liam O'Kelly	1986	1985	1985	
Na Piarsaigh	Limerick	William O'Donoghue	Kieran Bermingham	2016	2017	2020	
Naas	Kildare	Brian Byrne	Tom Mullally			2021	
Portaferry	Down	Conor Mageean	Karol Keating		2014	2020	
Shinrone	Offaly	Jason Sampson	Trevor Fletcher				
Slaughtneil	Derry	Cormac O'Doherty	Michael McShane		2021	2021	
St Finbarr's	Cork	Billy Hennessy	Ger Cunningham	1978	1980	1993	
St Mullin's	Carlow	Michael Walsh	Maurice Aylward			2019	
St Thomas'	Galway	Conor Cooney	Kenneth Burke	2013	—	2021	

== Leinster ==
Quarter-finals		Semi-finals		Final
Naas (Kildare)	4–21
Shinrone (Offaly)	0–18	Naas (Kildare)	1–16
Ballyhale Shamrocks (Kilkenny)	5–25	Ballyhale Shamrocks (Kilkenny)	3–22
Castletown-Geoghegan (Westmeath)	0–15			Ballyhale Shamrocks (Kilkenny)	2–22
St Mullin's GAA (Carlow)	1–19			Kilmacud Crokes (Dublin)	2–19
Ferns St Aidan's GAA (Wexford)	1–17	St Mullin's GAA (Carlow)	1–12
Kilmacud Crokes (Dublin)	2–18	Kilmacud Crokes (Dublin)	1–24
Clough–Ballacolla (Laois)	1–12

=== Quarter-finals ===
12 November 2022 Quarter-final	Naas	4–21 – 0–18	Shinrone	St Conleth's Park
	J Sheridan 1–11 (10f), K Aherne 1–1, J Burke and C Sheridan 1–0 each, B Byrne, S Leacy and C Dowling 0–2 each, K Whelan, H Carroll, C Doran (f) 0–1 each.		D Morkan 0–11 (11f), D Maher 0–2, K Sampson (sideline), D Cleary, L Watkins, S Cleary and J Sampson 0–1 each.

13 November 2022 Quarter-final	St Mullin's	1–19 – 1–17	Ferns St Aidan's	Dr Cullen Park
	M Kavanagh 0–12 (11f), James Doyle 0–3, C Kehoe 1–0, P Boland 0–2, J O’Neill, P O’Shea 0–1 each.	Report	I Byrne 0-8f, P Morris 1–1, J Dwyer 0–3, D Doyle 0–2, C Byrne Dunbar, C Turner, B Jordan 0–1 each.

13 November 2022 Quarter-final	Ballyhale Shamrocks	5–25 – 0–15	Castletown-Geoghegan	Nowlan Park
	E Cody 2–9 (7f), C Fennelly 2–3, N Shorthall 1–2, K Corcoran 0–3, R Corcoran, J Cuddihy, A Mullen 0–2 each, E Shefflin, E Kenneally 0–1 each.	Report	N O'Brien 0–8 (5f), J Gallagher 0–5, P Clarke 0–2.

13 November 2022 Quarter-final	Kilmacud Crokes	2–18 – 1–12	Clough–Ballacolla	Parnell Park
	O O’Rorke 1–11 (9f, 1 ’65), B Scanlon 1–0, F Whitely, D Purcell 0–2 each, C MacGabhann, F Ó Ceallaigh, B Hayes 0–1 each.	Report	S Maher 0–8 (7f), C Dunne 1–0, W Dunphy 0–2 (1 sideline), S Bergin, K Mulhall 0–1 each.

=== Semi-finals ===
27 November 2022 Semi-final	Naas	1–16 – 3–22	Ballyhale Shamrocks	Croke Park
	J Sheridan 0–12 (9f), C Dowling 1–0, K Whelan 0–2, H Carroll, J Burke 0–1 each.	Report	TJ Reid 1–6 (1–0 pen, 4f), A Mullen 0–4, E Cody 1–2, J Cuddihy 1–0, R Corcoran, D Corcoran, P Mullen 0–3 each, E Reid 0–1.	Referee: T Gleeson (Dublin)

27 November 2022 Semi-final	St Mullin's	1–12 – 1–24	Kilmacud Crokes	Croke Park
	M Kavanagh 0–5 (4f), C Kehoe 1–2, P Boland, James Doyle 0–2 each, J Kavanagh 0–1.	Report	O O’Rorke 0–11 (5 f, 2 65), R Hayes 1–1, F Whitely, D Purcell 0–3 each, M Roche, B Scanlan 0–2 each, C Conway, B Sheehy 0–1 each.	Referee: J Keenan (Wicklow)

=== Final ===
4 December 2022 Final	Ballyhale Shamrocks	2–22 – 2–19	Kilmacud Crokes	Croke Park
	TJ Reid (0–8, 5 frees); C Fennelly (1–3); A Mullen (0–4); E Kenneally (1–0); E Cody, N Shortall (0–2 each); R Reid, P Mullen, J Cuddihy (0–1 each).	Report	O O’Rorke (0–8, 5 frees, 2 65s); D Purcell (0–5); A Considine (1–1); C Conway (1–0); F Whitely (0–2); M Roche, B Hayes, R Hayes (0–1 each).	Referee: P O'Dwyer (Carlow)

== Munster ==
Quarter-finals		Semi-finals		Final
		Ballygunner (Waterford)	2–20
Ballygunner (Waterford)	4–19	Na Piarsaigh (Limerick)	2–15
Kilruane MacDonaghs (Tipperary)	0–14			Ballygunner (Waterford)	1–23
				Ballyea (Clare)	0–17
		Ballyea (Clare)	1–12
		St Finbarr's (Cork)	0–14

=== Quarter-final ===
6 November 2022 Quarter-final	Ballygunner	4–19 – 0–14	Kilruane MacDonaghs	Walsh Park
	K Mahony 2–2, P Fitzgerald 1–4, Pauric Mahony 0–6 (3f), H Ruddle 1–0, D Hutchinson 0–3, B O'Keeffe 0–2, P Hogan 0–1, J Foley 0–1.	Report	W Cleary 0-5f, C Darcy 0–3, J Cahill 0–2, N O'Meara 0–1, E Hogan 0–1, S McAdams 0–1, K O'Kelly 0–1.	Referee: N Malone (Clare)

=== Semi-finals ===
20 November 2022 Semi-final	Na Piarsaigh	2–15 – 2–20	Ballygunner	TUS Gaelic Grounds
	K Downes 0–4 (3f), C Boylan 1–1, K Dempsey 1–1, W Henn 0–3, P Casey 0–3, D Dempsey 0–1, M Foley 0–1, R Lynch 0-1f.	Report	Pauric Mahony 0–13 (6f), D Hutchinson 1–0, C Sheahan 0–4, P Fitzgerald 1–1, P Hogan 0–1, R Power 0–1	Referee: C Lyons (Cork)

20 November 2022 Semi-final	Ballyea	1–12 – 0–14	St Finbarr's	Cusack Park
	T Kelly 0–5 (0–2 65, 0-1f), M Gavin 0–3, G Brennan 1–0, G O’Connell, N Deasy (f), A Griffin, B O’Connell 0–1 each.	Report	B Cunningham 0–9 (0-5f), B O’Connor, B Hayes 0–2 each, E Twomey 0–1.	Referee: M Kennedy (Tipperary)

=== Final ===
3 December 2022 Final	Ballygunner	1–23 – 0–17	Ballyea	FBD Semple Stadium
	Pauric Mahony 0–10 (0-5f, 0–1 ’65), P Fitzgerald 1–4, D Hutchinson 0–4, K Mahony 0–2, M Mahony 0–2, P Hogan 0–1	Report	T Kelly 0–11 (0-6f, 0–1 ’65), N Deasy 0–2, P Lillis 0–2, J Murphy 0–1, M Gavin 0–1.	Referee: M Kennedy (Tipperary)

== Ulster ==
Semi-finals		Final
Slaughtneil (Derry)	2–24
Portaferry (Down)	0–11	Slaughtneil (Derry)	0–16
		Dunloy Cúchullains (Antrim)	2–12

=== Semi-final ===
20 November 2022 Semi-final	Portaferry	0–11 – 2–24	Slaughtneil	Corrigan Park
	C O’Prey 0–4 (1f), T McGrattan 0–2, R Blair 0–2 (2fs), F Turpin 0–2, D Sands 0–1.	Report	B Cassidy 1–7 (1f, 1sideline), C O’Doherty 0–9 (9fs), J McGuigan 1–0, Shane McGuigan 0–4, B Rogers 0–3, P McCullagh 0–1.	Referee: C McDonald (Antrim)

=== Final ===
4 December 2022 Final	Dunloy Cúchullains	2–12 – 0–16	Slaughtneil	Athletic Grounds
	C Cunning (0–7, 3f), N Elliott (1–1), A Crawford (0–1), A McGrath (0–1), D Smith (0–1), N McKeague (0–1)	Report	C O’Doherty (0–5, 0-4f, 1'65), G Bradley (0–3), S McGuigan (0–2), B Rogers (0–2), C McKaigue (0–1), B Cassidy (0–1), J McGuigan (0–1), S Cassidy (0–1)	Referee: P Owens (Liatroim)

== Bracket ==
Semi-finals		Final
St Thomas' (Galway)	0–13
Dunloy Cúchullains (Antrim)	1–14	Dunloy Cúchullains (Antrim)	1–15
Ballygunner (Waterford)	0–16	Ballyhale Shamrocks (Kilkenny)	1–22
Ballyhale Shamrocks (Kilkenny)	1–16

== Semi-finals ==
18 December 2022 Semi-final	St Thomas' (Galway)	0–13 – 1–14	Dunloy Cúchullains (Antrim)	Croke Park
	C Cooney (0–6, 0–4 frees); M Caulfield(0–2), D McGlynn (0–2); E Duggan (0–1), O Flannery (0–1), É Burke (0–1).	Report	C Cunning (0–7, 0–3 frees, 0–1 ‘65); Keelan Molloy (1–2); N Elliott (0–2); E Smyth (0–1), S Elliott (0–1), A McGrath (0–1).	Referee: J Keenan (Wicklow)

18 December 2022 Semi-final	Ballygunner (Waterford)	0–16 – 1–16	Ballyhale Shamrocks (Kilkenny)	Croke Park
	Pauric Mahony (0–6, 4 frees); D Hutchinson (0–4); P Fitzgerald (0–2); C Sheahan, R Power, M Mahony, K Mahony (0–1 each).	Report	TJ Reid (1–8, 1–0 pen, 7 frees, 1 65); E Cody (0–2); J Cuddihy, C Fennelly, A Mullen, P Mullen, R Corcoran, E Kenneally (0–1 each).	Referee: L Gordon (Galway)

== Final ==
22 January 2023 Final	Dunloy Cúchullains (Antrim)	1–15 – 1–22	Ballyhale Shamrocks (Kilkenny)	Croke Park
	C Gunning 0–7 frees; R Molloy 1–1; P Shiels 0–2; O Quinn, E Smyth, N McKeague, K Molloy and S Elliott 0–1 each.	Report	E Cody 1–5; TJ Reid 0–7 (0–4 65s, 0–2 frees); C Fennelly 0–2; K Corcoran, E Shefflin, D Corcoran, R Corcoran, P Mullen, E Kenneally, J Cuddihy and B Cody 0–1 each.	Referee: J Murphy (Limerick)

== Statistics ==
=== Top scorers ===
Overall

Rank	Player	Club	Tally	Total	Matches	Average
1	T. J. Reid	Ballyhale Shamrocks	2–29	35	4	8.75
1	Pauric Mahony	Ballygunner	0–35	35	4	8.75
3	Oisín O'Rorke	Kilmacud Crokes	1–30	33	3	11.00
4	Eoin Cody	Ballyhale Shamrocks	4–20	32	5	6.40
5	Jack Sheridan	Naas	1–23	26	2	13.00
6	Conal Cunning	Dunloy Cúchullains	0–21	21	3	7.00
7	Patrick Fitzgerald	Ballygunner	3–11	20	4	5.00
8	Colin Fennelly	Ballyhale Shamrocks	3-09	18	5	3.60
9	Martin Kavanagh	St Mullin's	0–17	17	2	8.50
10	Tony Kelly	Ballyea	0–16	16	2	8.00

In a single game

Rank	Player	Club	Tally	Total	Opposition
1	Eoin Cody	Ballyhale Shamrocks	2-09	15	Castletown-Geoghegan
2	Jack Sheridan	Naas	1–11	14	Shinrone
2	Oisín O'Rorke	Kilmacud Crokes	1–11	14	Clough–Ballacolla
4	Pauric Mahony	Ballygunner	0–13	13	Na Piarsaigh
5	Martin Kavanagh	St Mullin's	0–12	12	Ferns St Aidan's
5	Jack Sheridan	Naas	0–12	12	Ballyhale Shamrocks
7	T. J. Reid	Ballyhale Shamrocks	1-08	11	Ballygunner
7	Tony Kelly	Ballyea	0–11	11	Ballygunner
7	Donal Morkan	Shinrone	0–11	11	Naas
7	Oisín O'Rorke	Kilmacud Crokes	0–11	11	St Mullin's

== Awards ==
Team of the Year

1. Stephen O'Keeffe (Ballygunner)
2. Killian Corcoran (Ballyhale Shamrocks)
3. Joey Holden (Ballyhale Shamrocks)
4. Ryan McGarry (Dunloy)
5. Kevin Molloy (Dunloy)
6. Richie Reid (Ballyhale Shamrocks)
7. Darragh Corcoran (Ballyhale Shamrocks)
8. Conor Sheahan (Ballygunner)
9. Adrian Mullen (Ballyhale Shamrocks)
10. Eoin Cody (Ballyhale Shamrocks)
11. T. J. Reid (Ballyhale Shamrocks)
12. Pauric Mahony (Ballygunner)
13. Conal Cunning (Dunloy)
14. Colin Fennelly (Ballyhale Shamrocks)
15. Patrick Fitzgerald (Ballygunner)

Hurler of the Year

- PLAYER NAME (Club)

Also nominated: Joey Holden (Ballyhale Shamrocks) & Adrian Mullen (Ballyhale Shamrocks) & Stephen O'Keeffe (Ballygunner))
