= Sean Brennan =

Sean Brennan may refer to:

- Seán Brennan (born 1995), Irish hurler.
- Sean Brennan, American instrumentalist with London After Midnight
- Sean Brennan (politician), American state legislator in Ohio
