= List of Leinster Senior Club Hurling Championship winners =

This is a list of all teams and players who have won the Leinster Senior Club Hurling Championship since its inception in 1970.

== By team ==
The 50 Leinster Senior Club Hurling Championships have been won by 18 different teams. Ballyhale Shamrocks have won the most titles. The current champions are Ballyhale Shamrocks, who won the title in 2019.

#	Team	Wins	Winning Years
1	Ballyhale Shamrocks	10	1978, 1980, 1983, 1989, 2006, 2008, 2009, 2014, 2018, 2019
2	Birr	7	1991, 1994, 1997, 1999, 2001, 2002, 2007
3	Rathnure	6	1971, 1973, 1977, 1986, 1987, 1998
4	St. Rynagh's	4	1970, 1972, 1982, 1993
4	James Stephens	4	1975, 1981, 2004, 2005
5	Buffer's Alley	3	1985, 1988, 1992
6	Glenmore	2	1990, 1995
6	Camross	2	1976, 1996
6	Cuala	2	2016, 2017
6	O'Loughlin Gaels	2	2003, 2010
7	Oulart the Ballagh	1	2015
7	Kilcormac/Killoughey	1	2012
7	Coolderry	1	2011
7	The Fenians	1	1974
7	Crumlin	1	1979
7	St. Martin's	1	1984
7	Graigue-Ballycallan	1	2000
7	Mount Leinster Rangers	1	2013

== By year ==
List of Leinster Senior Club Hurling Championship winners
Year	Team	Players	Ref
1970	St. Rynagh's	D Martin, N Gallagher, F Whelehan, A Horan, P Moylan, J Dooley, R Dolan, B Johnston, PJ Whelehan, B Lyons, R Horan (c), G Burke, S Moylan, B Moylan, P Mulhaire.	
1971	Rathnure	M Foley, Jim Quigley, A Somers, M Mooney, J O'Connor, T O'Connor, J Higgins, J Mooney, M Byrne, P Flynn, M Quigley, J Murphy, D Quigley, S Barron, J English.	
1972	St. Rynagh's	D Martin, J Dooley, F Whelehan, A Horan, P Moylan, P Horan, H Dolan, B Johnston, PJ Whelehan, M Moylan, B Moylan, S Moylan, G Burke, R Horan, P Mulhaire. Subs: B Lyons, JJ Devery.	
1973	Rathnure	M Foley, Jim Quigley, M Mooney, J O'Connor, T O'Connor, S Murphy, M Byrne, J Mooney, John Quigley, M Quigley, J Murphy, P Flynn, V Fenlon, D Quigley. Subs: J Higgins, S Murphy, L Doyle.	
1974	Fenians	PJ Ryan, S Delaney, N Orr, M Fitzpatrick, R Dowling, P Henderson, G Henderson, M Garrett, G Murphy, J Moriarty, P Delaney, F Hawks, W Watson, P Fitzpatrick, B Fitzpatrick. Sub: J Ryan.	
1975	James Stephens	M Moore, P Neary, F Larkin (c), J Morrissey, J Hennessy, B Cody, J O'Brien, M Taylor, D McCormack, T McCormack, L O'Brien, J McCormack, M Crotty, M Leahy, G Tyrrell.	
1976	Camross	J Carroll, J Dooley, T Cuddy, R Moloney, J Doran, J Fitzpatrick, O Cuddy, PJ Cuddy, P Dowling, M Cuddy, G Cuddy, M Carroll, M Cuddy, F Keenan, S Cuddy. Sub: T Keenan	
1977	Rathnure	M Foley, A Somers, D Quigley, T O'Connor, J O'Connor, M Codd, S Murphy, J Conran, J Houlihan, J Murphy, M Quigley, D O'Connor, P Quigley, John Quigley, P Flynn. Subs: M Byrne, L Byrne.	
1978	Ballyhale Shamrocks	O Harrington, D Shefflin (c), L Dalton, M Healy, W Phelan, M Mason, D Connolly, S Fennelly, J Walsh, S Reid, P Holden, G Fennelly, B Fennelly, M Fennlly, L Fennelly. Subs: K Fennelly, F Holohan.	
1979	Crumlin	A Forde, P Sherwin, N Quinn, M Reilly, C Henneberry, J Murphy, L Martin, D Murphy, L Henneberry, L Broderick, P McCarthy, P Kavanagh, J Kealy, M Reynolds, B Donovan. Sub: B Murphy.	
1980	Ballyhale Shamrocks	K Fennelly, W Phelan, L Dalton, R Reid (c), F Holohan, M Mason, S Fennelly, J Walsh, G Fennelly, S Grace, P Holden, M Kelly, B Fennelly, M Fennelly, L Fennelly. Subs: J Healy, S Reid.	
1981	James Stephens	M Moore, P Neary, B Cody, F Larkin, J Hennessy, M Hennessy, J O'Brien (c), D Collins, D McCormack, P Brennan, W Walton, E Kelly, M Crotty, A Egan, J McCormack. Sub: D Bolger	
1982	St. Rynagh's	D Martin, M Whelehan, J Dooley, B Keane, T White, A Fogarty, M Moylan, S White (c), A Horan, T Conneely, P Horan, N Molloy, J Horan, F Kenny, D Fogarty. Subs: D Devery, H Dolan.	
1983	Ballyhale Shamrocks	O Harrington, D Connolly, L Dalton, W Phelan, L Long, M Mason, F Holohan, S Fennelly, J Walsh, G Fennelly, L Fennelly, D Fennelly, K Fennelly (c), M Fennelly, M Kelly. Sub: S Grace.	
1984	St. Martin's	B Shore, N Morrissey, T Maher, J Kelly, T Walsh, J Moran, M Maher, P Lawlor, J Moran, J Morrissey, P Moran, J Brennan, D Coonan, T Moran, R Moloney. Subs: JJ Dowling, E Morrissey.	
1985	Buffers Alley	H Butler, M Murphy, P Kenny, C Doran, S Whelan (c), P Gahan, J O'Donoghue, M Foley, M Casey, T Dempsey, T Dwyer, G Sweeney, M Butler, T Doran, S O'Leary.	
1986	Rathnure	T Morrissey, M Codd, M Quigley, J Doyle, D Sheehan, J O'Connell, J Conran, J Houlihan, L Ronan, J Codd, J Redmond, N Hearne, P Codd, J Murphy, M Morrissey. Subs: V Reddy, J Quigley.	
1987	Rathnure	T Morrissey, M Codd, M Quigley, J Doyle, S O'Leary, J O'Connell, J Conran, J Codd, J Houlihan, N Hearne, J Redmond, P Dunphy, P Codd, J Murphy, M Morrissey.	
1988	Buffers Alley	H Butler, B Murphy, P Kenny, J O'Leary, C Whelan, M Foley, P Gahan, E Synnott, S Whelan, T Dempsey, M Casey, P O'Donoghue, M Butler, T Doran, F O'Leary. Sub: M Furlong.	
1989	Ballyhale Shamrocks	K Fennelly, M Fennelly, F Holohan, W Phelan (c), D Walsh, P Phelan, S Fennelly, G Fennelly, T Shefflin, D Fennelly, J Lawlor, T Phelan, L Fennelly, B Fennelly, B Mason.	
1990	Glenmore	M Deady, E O'Connor, W O'Connor, PJ O'Connor, L Walsh, M Aylward, D Emmett, D Heffernan, R Heffernan (c), D Mullally, M Phelan, P Barron, J Heffernan, C Heffernan, J Flynn.	
1991	Birr	P Kirwan, M Hogan, D Geoghegan, B Hennessy, Brian Whelehan, J Errity, G Cahill, J Pilkington, M Feenane, D Pilkington, P Murphy, A Cahill, N Hogan, R Landy, O O'Neill.	
1992	Buffers Alley	H Butler, H Lee, B Murphy, J O'Leary, P Gahan, P Kenny, C Whelan, M Foley, S Whelan, E Sinnott, T Dempsey, P Donohoe, F O'Leary, J Gahan, S O'Leary. Subs: M Furlong, P Leacy.	
1993	St. Rynagh's	D Hughes, S McGuckin, C Flannery, B Keane, T White, S White, M Rigney, H Rigney, M Hanamy, M Conneely, A Fogarty, F Dolan, D Devery, M Duignan, T Moylan.	
1994	Birr	R Shiels, M Feenane, J Errity, B Hennessy, G Cahill, Brian Whelehan, N Hogan, D Regan, C McGlone, O O'Neill, P Murphy, D Pilkington, S Whelehan, J Pilkington, F Pilkington. Sub: L Power.	
1995	Glenmore	F Kirwan, P Fitzgerald, E O'Connor, W O'Connor, S Vereker, PJ O'Connor, J Walsh, D Heffernan, R Heffernan, S Dollard, M Phelan, D Mullally, M Murphy, C Heffernan, J Phelan. Sub: P Mullally.	
1996	Camross	T Lowry, J Cuddy, J Doran, J Scully, F Dowling, T Delaney, S Moore, O Dowling, G Dunne, PJ Cuddy, J Dollard, R Cuddy, D Culleton, M Collier, P Hogan. Sub: B Keenan.	
1997	Birr	B Mullins, S Whelehan, J Errity, B Hennessy, Barry Whelehan, Brian Whelehan, N Claffey, C Hanniffy, J Pilkington, P Carroll, C McGlone, G Cahill, L Power, D Hanniffy, D Pilkington. Sub: O O'Neill.	
1998	Rathnure	J Morrissey, S Somers, J Conran, D Guiney, L Somers, J Mooney (c), R Guiney, M Redmond, M O'Leary, A Codd, M Byrne, P Codd, M Morrisey, C Byrne, B O'Leary.	
1999	Birr	B Mullins, G Cahill, J Errity, D Franks, Barry Whelehan, Brian Whelehan, N Claffey, J Pilkington, B Milne, D Hanniffy, G Hanniffy, L Power, P Hanniffy, D Pilkington, S Whelehan. Subs: P Molloy, O O'Neill.	
2000	Graigue Ballycallan	J Ronan; J Butler, P O'Dwyer, J Ryall; T McCluskey, T A Hoyne; J Young (c), E O'Dwyer; M Hoyne, J Hoyne, T Dermody; A Ronan, D Byrne, E Brennan. Subs: D Hoyne, P Hoyne.	
2001	Birr	B Mullins; G Cahill, J Errity, JP O'Meara; D Franks, Brian Whelehan, N Claffey; J Pilkington, S Brown; L Power, Barry Whelehan, D Pilkington; G Hanniffy, S Whelehan(c), R Hanniffy. Subs: P Molloy, D Hayden, C Hanniffy, P Carroll.	
2002	Birr	B Mullins; G Cahill, J Errity, JP O'Meara; D Franks, Brian Whelehan, N Claffey; J Pilkington, Barry Whelehan; D Pilkington, G Hanniffy (c), R Hanniffy; P Molloy, S Browne, S Whelehan. Sub:- L Power	
2003	O'Loughlin Gaels	K Cleere; B Kelly, B Hogan, B Murphy; A O'Brien, A Comerford (c), S Dowling; S Cummins, A Geoghegan; J Comerford, M Comerford, N Skehan; M Nolan, C Furlong, B Dowling. Sub: N Bergin.	
2004	James Stephens	F Cantwell, D Cody, M Phelan, D Grogan, P Butler, P Larkin, P Barry (c), J Tyrell, B McEvoy, E McCormack, E Larkin, G Whelan, J Murphy, R Hayes, D McCormack. Subs: J Mernagh, J Murray.	
2005	James Stephens	F Cantwell; D Cody, M Phelan, D Grogan; J Tyrrell, P Larkin, P Barry (c); B McEvoy, P O'Brien; J Murray, E Larkin, G Whelan; E McCormack, R Hayes, D McCormack. Subs: S Egan, M Ruth.	
2006	Ballyhale Shamrocks	J Connolly; P Shefflin, E Walsh, P Holden; K Nolan, A Cummins, B Aylward; J Fitzpatrick, M Fennelly; E Fitzpatrick, H Shefflin, T J Reid; P Reid, E Reid, M Aylward. Subs: T Coogan (c), D Hoyne, M Dermody, B Costello.	
2007	Birr	B Mullins; JP O'Meara, N Claffey, M Verney; B Watkins, P Cleary, D Hayden; R Hanniffy, Barry Whelehan; G Hanniffy, Brian Whelehan (c), S Whelehan; S Browne, P O'Meara, K Hehir. Sub: M Dwane.	
2008	Ballyhale Shamrocks	J Connolly; P Shefflin, E Walsh, P Holden; M Dermody, A Cummins, B Aylward (c); J Fitzpatrick, M Fennelly; C Fennelly, H Shefflin, TJ Reid; P Reid, E Reid, M Aylward.	
2009	Ballyhale Shamrocks	J Connolly; A Cuddihy, A Cummins, P Holden; P Shefflin, E Walsh (c), B Aylward; J Fitzpatrick, M Fennelly; TJ Reid, H Shefflin, C Fennelly; E Reid, P Reid, D Hoyne . Subs: B Costello, M Aylward, B Costello, K Nolan, J Walsh.	
2010	O'Loughlin Gaels	S Murphy; B Kelly, A Kearns, E Kearns; A O’Brien, B Hogan, N Bergin; P Dowling, M Nolan; A Geoghegan, M Bergin, N McEvoy; B Dowling, D Loughnane, M Comerford (c). Subs: B Murphy, S Cummins.	
2011	Coolderry	S Corcoran, B Kelly, T Corcoran, A Corcoran, K Brady, J Brady, B O’Meara (c), K Teehan, D King, B Carroll, B Teehan, C Parlon, E Ryan, M Corcoran, D Murray. Subs: K Connolly; S Connolly; M Bergin	
2012	Kilcormac/Killoughey	Conor Slevin; J Grogan, G Healion, A McConville; K Grogan, P Healion, B Leonard; D Kilmartin, K Leonard; Ciaran Slevin (c), C Mahon, P Geraghty; J Gorman, D Currams, T Geraghty. Subs: J Geraghty, T Fletcher.	
2013	Mount Leinster Rangers	F Foley; M Doyle, G Doyle, G Kelly; D Byrne, R Coady, E Coady; D Byrne, P Nolan; D Phelan (c), P Coady, E Byrne; E Doyle, J Coady, D Murphy. Subs: HP O'Byrne, J Hickey, W Hickey.	
2014	Ballyhale Shamrocks	R Reid; K Nolan, J Holden, A Cuddihy; P Shefflin, M Fennelly, B Aylward; D Hoyne, C Walsh; J Fitzpatrick, C Fennelly, TJ Reid (c); E Reid, H Shefflin, M Aylward. Subs: B Cody, A Cummins, R Corcoran, M Dermody, P Reid, K Mullen.	
2015	Oulart-the Ballagh	C O'Leary; B Kehoe (c), K Rossiter, E Moore; P Roche, S Murphy, K Sheridan; D Redmond, M Jacob; R Jacob, T Dunne, T Storey; D Mythen, G Sinnott, N Kirwan. Subs: D Morton, P Murphy, P Sutton.	
2016	Cuala	S Brennan; O Gough (c), Cian O'Callaghan, S Timlin; S Moran, P Schutte, J Sheanon; J Malone, D O'Connell; S Treacy, C Cronin, C Waldron; D Treacy, Con O'Callaghan, M Schutte. Subs: C Sheanon.	
2017	Cuala	S Brennan; O Gough, Cian O'Callaghan, S Timlin; P Schutte (c), S Moran, J Sheanon; D O'Connell, S Treacy; C Cronin, D Treacy, J Malone; C Sheanon, Con O'Callaghan, N Kenny. Subs: C Waldron, B Fitzgerald, N Carty, R Tierney, S Stapleton.	
2018	Ballyhale Shamrocks	D Mason, B Butler, J Holden, D Mullen, E Shefflin, M Fennelly (c), R Reid, C Walsh, R Corcoran, A Mullen, TJ Reid, B Cody, E Reid, C Fennelly, E Cody. Subs: G Butler, M Aylward, J Cuddihy, K Mullen, P Mullen.	
2019	Ballyhale Shamrocks	D Mason; B Butler, J Holden, D Mullen; E Shefflin, M Fennelly (c), D Corcoran; R Corcoran, C Phelan; B Cody, TJ Reid, A Mullen; E Reid, C Fennelly, E Cody. Subs: J Cuddihy; C Walsh; G Butler; M Aylward; J Devereux.	
