= 2023 All-Ireland Senior Club Hurling Championship final =

2023 All-Ireland Senior Club Hurling Championship Final
- Event: 2022-23 All-Ireland Senior Club Hurling Championship
Dunloy	Ballyhale Shamrocks
1-15	1-22
- Date: 22 January 2023
- Venue: Croke Park, Dublin
- Man of the Match: Eoin Cody
- Referee: J Murphy (Limerick)
- Weather: Dry

The 2023 All-Ireland Senior Club Hurling Championship final was a hurling match that was played at Croke Park on 22 January 2023 to determine the winners of the 2022-23 All-Ireland Senior Club Hurling Championship, the 52nd season of the All-Ireland Senior Club Hurling Championship, a tournament organised by the Gaelic Athletic Association for the champion clubs of the four provinces of Ireland. The match was shown live on TG4.

The final was contested by Dunloy of Antrim and Ballyhale Shamrocks of Kilkenny.

Ballyhale Shamrocks captained by Ronan Corcoran won the game by 1-22 to 1-15 to claim a ninth All-Ireland title.

== Match ==
=== Details ===
22 January 2023 Final	Dunloy Cúchullains (Antrim)	1-15 - 1-22	Ballyhale Shamrocks (Kilkenny)	Croke Park
	C Gunning 0-7 frees; R Molloy 1-1; P Shiels 0-2; O Quinn, E Smyth, N McKeague, K Molloy and S Elliott 0-1 each.	Report	E Cody 1-5; TJ Reid 0-7 (0-4 65s, 0-2 frees); C Fennelly 0-2; K Corcoran, E Shefflin, D Corcoran, R Corcoran, P Mullen, E Kenneally, J Cuddihy and B Cody 0-1 each.	Referee: J Murphy (Limerick)
