= Seán Brennan =

Irish hurler

Personal information
- Native name: Seán Ó Braonáin (Irish)
- Born: 18 February 1995 (age 31) Cherrywood, Dublin, Ireland
- Occupation: Underwriter
- Height: 5 ft 11 in (180 cm)

Sport
- Sport: Hurling
- Position: Goalkeeper
Club
- Years: Club
- Cuala
Club titles
- Dublin titles: 5
- Leinster titles: 2
- All-Ireland Titles: 2
College
- Years: College
- Dublin Institute of Technology
College titles
- Fitzgibbon titles: 0
Inter-county*
Years	County	Apps (scores)
2018-present	Dublin	5 (0-00)
Inter-county titles
- Leinster titles: 0
- All-Irelands: 0
- NHL: 0
- All Stars: 0
- *Inter County team apps and scores correct as of 12:11, 5 July 2021.

Seán Brennan (born 18 February 1995) is an Irish hurler who plays for Dublin Senior Championship club Cuala and at inter-county level with the Dublin senior hurling team. He currently lines out as a goalkeeper.

== Career ==
Brennan first came to prominence at club level during a golden age for the Cuala club. He lined out in goal when the club won consecutive All-Ireland Club Championship titles in 2017 and 2018. He has also won two Leinster Club Championship titles and was included on the inaugural Club Team of the Year in 2018. Having never played at minor inter-county level, Brennan first lined out with Dublin as goalkeeper with the under-21 team in 2015. He made his senior debut during the 2019 Walsh Cup.

== Career statistics ==
As of 3 July 2021.

Team	Year	National League			Leinster		All-Ireland		Total	
Team	Year	Division	Apps	Score	Apps	Score	Apps	Score	Apps	Score
Dublin	2019	Division 1B	1	0-00	0	0-00	0	0-00	1	0-00
Dublin	2020	Division 1B	2	0-00	0	0-00	0	0-00	2	0-00
Dublin	2021	Division 1B	3	0-00	0	0-00	0	0-00	3	0-00
Total			6	0-00	0	0-00	0	0-00	6	0-00

== Honours ==
Harry Bolands

- North American Senior Hurling Championship: 2015

Cuala

- All-Ireland Senior Club Hurling Championship: 2017, 2018
- Leinster Senior Club Hurling Championship: 2016, 2017
- Dublin Senior Hurling Championship: 2015, 2016, 2017, 2019, 2020
