= Aidan O'Brien (football manager) =

Gaelic football manager

Aidan O'Brien is a Gaelic football manager. He coached the Wexford county team.

== Early life ==
He is originally a native of County Westmeath, He later moved to Adamstown, County Wexford.

== Career ==
He was first approached to manage Wexford in 2007 after Paul Bealin resigned, but turned down the offer.

He became the Wexford senior manager after Jason Ryan vacated the position. He held the position from October 2012 until August 2014, reaching the Leinster Senior Football Championship semi-finals on both occasions.

He works as a teacher at Good Counsel College in New Ross and coached them to All-Ireland Colleges Senior football success. His team won the Wexford Senior Football Championship with Horeswood and managed Wexford to a Leinster Under-21 Football Championship. However, the team lost that game to Kildare. He left over family commitments, but coached Geraldine O'Hanrahans to a Junior Football Championship title two years before they gave him to him the Wexford senior position. He was vice-principal of Good Counsel College.

Sporting positions
Preceded by Jason Ryan	Wexford Senior Football Manager; 2012–2014	Succeeded by David Power
