= Patrick Fitzgerald (hurler) =

Irish hurler (born 2004)

Personal information
- Native name: Pádraig Mac Gearailt (Irish)
- Born: 2004 (age 21–22) Waterford, Ireland
- Occupation: Student

Sport
- Sport: Hurling
- Position: Right corner-forward
Club*
Years	Club	Apps (scores)
2022-present	Ballygunner	34 (11-84)
Club titles
- Waterford titles: 4
- Munster titles: 3
- All-Ireland Titles: 1
College
- Years: College
- 2022-present: SETU Waterford
College titles
- Fitzgibbon titles: 0
Inter-county**
Years	County	Apps (scores)
2023-	Waterford	0 (0-00)
Inter-county titles
- Munster titles: 0
- All-Irelands: 0
- NHL: 0
- All Stars: 0
- * club appearances and scores correct as of 22:50, 10 May 2024. **Inter County team apps and scores correct as of 22:36, 22 March 2023.

Patrick Fitzgerald (born 2004) is an Irish hurler. At club level he plays with Ballygunner and at inter-county level with the Waterford senior hurling team.

== Career ==
Fitzgerald first played hurling as a schoolboy at the (not with ballygunner?) De La Salle College, where he lined out in various grades including the Harty Cup. He later lined out as a student with SETU Waterford. Fitzgerald joined the Ballygunner senior team in 2022 and won a Waterford SHC title in his debut season. He later went on the win a Munster Club SHC title.

Fitzgerald first appeared on the inter-county scene during a two-year tenure with the Waterford minor hurling team in 2020 and 2021. He immediately progressed to the under-20 team. Fitzgerald made his senior team debut during the 2023 National League.

== Personal life ==
Fitzgerald's uncles, Billy and Shane O'Sullivan, and his cousins, Philip and Pauric Mahony, have also played for Ballygunner and Waterford.

== Career statistics ==
=== Club ===
As of 18 January 2026

Team	Year	Waterford		Munster		All-Ireland		Total	
Team	Year	Apps	Score	Apps	Score	Apps	Score	Apps	Score
Balygunner	2022-23	5	1-06	3	3-09	1	0-02	9	4-17
Balygunner	2023-24	5	2-15	3	0-07	1	1-04	9	3-26
Balygunner	2024-25	4	1-10	3	0-10	—		7	1-20
Balygunner	2025-26	4	2-08	3	1-10	2	0-03	9	3-21
Total		18	6-39	12	4-36	4	1-09	34	11-84

=== Inter-county ===
As of 19 March 2023

Team	Year	National League			Munster		All-Ireland		Total	
Team	Year	Division	Apps	Score	Apps	Score	Apps	Score	Apps	Score
Waterford Minor	2020	—			1	0-07	—		1	0-07
Waterford Minor	2021	—			2	0-19	—		2	0-19
Waterford Minor	Total	—			3	0-26	—		3	0-26
Waterford U20	2022	—			3	1-05	—		3	1-05
Waterford U20	Total	—			3	1-05	—		3	1-05
Waterford	2023	Division 1B	4	0-05	0	0-00	0	0-00	4	0-05
Waterford	Total		4	0-05	0	0-00	0	0-00	4	0-05
Career total			4	0-05	6	1-31	0	0-00	10	1-36

== Honours ==
Ballygunner

- All-Ireland Senior Club Hurling Championship: 2026
- Munster Senior Club Hurling Championship: 2022, 2023, 2025
- Waterford Senior Hurling Championship: 2022, 2023, 2024, 2025
