= Seán Moran =

Irish hurler

Personal information
- Native name: Seán Ó Moráin (Irish)
- Born: 16 December 1992 (age 33) Dalkey, County Dublin, Ireland
- Occupation: Consultant
- Height: 6 ft 1 in (185 cm)

Sport
- Sport: Hurling
- Position: Centre back
Club
- Years: Club
- 2011–: Cuala
Club titles
- Dublin titles: 3
- Leinster titles: 2
- All-Ireland Titles: 1
Inter-county
- Years: County
- 2015–2021: Dublin

Seán Moran (born 16 December 1992) is an Irish hurler who plays for Dublin Senior Championship club Cuala and formerly at inter-county level with the Dublin senior hurling team. He usually lines out as a centre-back.

== Honours ==
Cuala

- All-Ireland Senior Club Hurling Championship (2): 2017, 2018
- Leinster Senior Club Hurling Championship (2): 2016, 2017
- Dublin Senior Hurling Championship (3): 2015, 2016, 2017

Sporting positions
| Preceded by Chris Crummey | Dublin Senior Hurling Captain; 2019 | Succeeded by Danny Sutcliffe |
Awards
| Preceded by New award | GAA Club Hurler of the Year; 2018 | Succeeded by Adrian Mullen |
