= 2026 All-Ireland Senior Club Hurling Championship Final =

- Event: 2025-26 All-Ireland Senior Club Hurling Championship
Loughrea	Ballygunner
1-14	1-20
- Date: 18 January 2026
- Venue: Croke Park, Dublin
- Referee: C Mooney (Dublin)
- Weather: Dry

The 2026 All-Ireland Senior Club Hurling Championship final was a hurling match that was played at Croke Park on 18 January 2026 to determine the winners of the 2025-26 All-Ireland Senior Club Hurling Championship, the 55th season of the All-Ireland Senior Club Hurling Championship, a tournament organised by the Gaelic Athletic Association for the champion clubs of the four provinces of Ireland. The match was shown live on TG4.

The final was contested by Loughrea and Ballygunner, with 12-in-a-row Waterford champions Ballygunner managed by Jason Ryan winning 1-20 to 1-14. The cup was lifted by Ballygunner joint-captains Peter Hogan and Michael Mahony.

== Details ==
18 January 2026 Final	Loughrea (Galway)	1-14 - 1-20	Ballygunner (Waterford)	Croke Park
13:30 IWT (UTC±0)	T Killeen (0-6, 0-6 frees); D Shaughnessy (1-1); J Ryan (0-2); J Coen, I Hanrahan, A Burns, V Morgan, N Keary (0-1 each).	Report	Pauric Mahony (0-8, 0-6 frees, 0-2 ‘65); K Mahony (0-4); M Mahony (1-1); C Sheahan, P Fitzgerald (0-2 each); D Hutchinson, P Hogan, M Hartley (0-1 each).	Referee: C Mooney (Dublin)
