= Paul Schutte =

Irish hurler

Paul Schütte
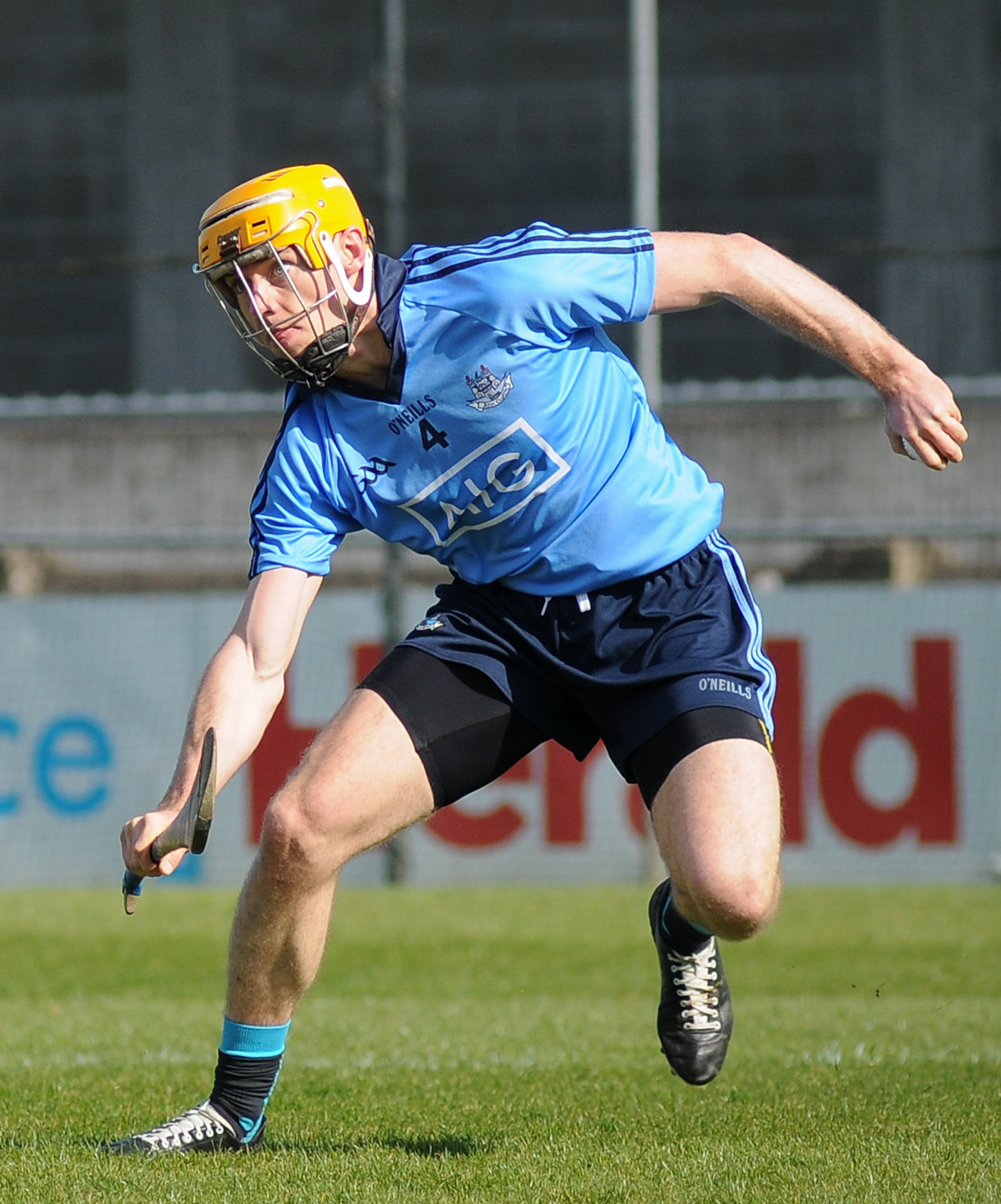
- Schutte playing for Dublin in 2015

Personal information
- Native name: Pól Schütte (Irish)
- Born: 10 March 1989 (age 37)
- Occupations: Treasury & Finance Administrator
- Height: 1.83 m (6 ft 0 in)

Sport
- Sport: Hurling
- Position: Left Corner Back
Club
- Years: Club
- 2006–: Cuala
Club titles
- Dublin titles: 2
- Leinster titles: 1
- All-Ireland Titles: 1
Inter-county
- Years: County
- 2011–2017: Dublin
Inter-county titles
- Leinster titles: 1
- NHL: 1

Paul Schütte (born 10 March 1989) is an Irish sportsperson. He plays hurling with his local club Cuala and has been a member of the Dublin senior inter-county team since 2011.

== Honours ==
Dublin

- National Hurling League (1): 2011
- Leinster Senior Hurling Championship (1): 2013
- Leinster Under-21 Hurling Championship (2): 2010
- Leinster Minor Hurling Championship (1): 2007

Achievements
| Preceded by Oisín Gough | All-Ireland Senior Club Hurling Final winning captain 2018 | Succeeded by Michael Fennelly |
