= Jason Ryan (Gaelic footballer) =

Irish Gaelic footballer and manager

Personal information
- Native name: Séasun Ó Riain (Irish)
- Born: 1976 (age 49–50) Dungarvan, County Waterford
- Occupation: Secondary school teacher

Sport
- Sport: Gaelic football
- Position: Left wing-forward
Club
- Years: Club
- 2003–: De La Salle
Club titles
- Waterford titles: 0
Inter-county
- Years: County
- 2001–2003 2005–2007: London; Waterford
Inter-county titles
- Munster titles: 0
- All-Irelands: 0
- NFL: 0
- All Stars: 0

Jason Ryan (born 1976) is an Irish Gaelic football manager and former player at senior level for the Waterford county team, as well as for the London county football team and London county hurling team.

Ryan is the former manager of the Kildare and Wexford county teams.

== Career ==
Born in Dungarvan, County Waterford, Ireland, Ryan's playing career brought him to both Ireland and Britain. While studying in St Mary's in Twickenham he played football with Tara and hurling with St Gabriel's, while also lining out with the London senior inter-county teams in both codes. He went on to be a P.E. teacher at Salesian School, Chertsey. On his return to Ireland Ryan joined the De La Salle club, while he also lined out at senior level with the Waterford county football team.

While still a player at club and inter-county levels, Ryan became involved in team management. He had some involvement with various school teams like De La Salle Waterford and Coláiste Chathal Naofa in Dungarvan before joining the Slieverue junior hurling team as physical trainer in 2006. The following year he was appointed trainer of the Clongeen football team in Wexford and helped them claim the county title. Ryan was appointed manager of the Wexford senior football team in November 2007. In September 2012, he stepped down as manager of Wexford. Ryan joined the Kildare GAA Senior Football panel as a coach in December 2012.

He was the manager of the senior Wexford county team from 2007 until 2012 when he stepped down.

In October 2013, he was appointed as senior Kildare county team manager.

In August 2015, Ryan stepped down as Kildare manager.

In February 2025, Ryan took over as manager of Ballygunner in Waterford. In January 2026, Ballygunner won their second All-Ireland Senior Club Hurling Championship after defeating Loughrea by 1-20 to 1-14 in the final.

Sporting positions
Preceded by Paul Bealin	Wexford Senior Football Manager; 2007–2012	Succeeded by Aidan O'Brien
Preceded by Kieran McGeeney	Kildare Senior Football Manager; 2013–2015	Succeeded by Cian O'Neill
