= 2014 Dublin Senior Hurling Championship =

Annual hurling competition season

The 2014 Dublin Senior Hurling Championship was the 125th staging of the Dublin Senior Hurling Championship since its establishment by the Dublin County Board in 1887. The knock-out championship began on 26 September 2014 and ended on 26 October 2014.

Ballyboden St. Enda's were the defending champions, however, they were defeated in the semi-final stage. Kilmacud Crokes won the title following a 2–16 to 1–15 defeat of St. Jude's in the final.

== Fixtures and results ==
=== Group 1 ===
Source.

Pos	Team	Pld	W	D	L	For	Ag.	Diff.	Pts.
1	Cuala	3	3	0	0	62	46	16	6
2	St. Vincent's	3	1	1	1	75	53	22	3
3	Parnells	3	1	0	2	48	73	-25	2
4	Craobh Chiaráin	3	0	1	2	45	58	-13	1

=== Group 2 ===
Source.

Pos	Team	Pld	W	D	L	For	Ag.	Diff.	Pts.
1	Kilmacud Crokes	3	3	0	0	69	39	30	6
2	Ballyboden St. Enda's	3	2	0	1	63	49	14	4
3	St. Patrick's	3	1	0	2	55	61	-6	2
4	St. Oliver Plunkett's	3	0	0	3	34	72	-38	0

=== Group 3 ===
Source.

Pos	Team	Pld	W	D	L	For	Ag.	Diff.	Pts.
1	O'Toole's	3	2	1	0	69	56	13	5
2	Faughs	3	2	0	1	58	52	6	4
3	St. Brigid's	3	1	1	1	53	54	-1	3
4	Na Fianna	3	0	0	3	43	61	-18	0

=== Group 4 ===
Source.

Pos	Team	Pld	W	D	L	For	Ag.	Diff.	Pts.
1	St. Jude's	3	2	1	0	65	58	7	5
2	Lucan Sarsfields	3	1	2	0	60	51	9	4
3	Crumlin	3	1	0	2	57	60	-3	2
4	Ballinteer St. John's	3	0	1	2	60	73	-13	1

=== Relegation play-offs ===
28 September 2014 Semi-final	Ballinteer St. John's	1-15 - 0-15	Na Fianna	O'Toole Park
10:30

28 September 2014 Semi-final	Craobh Chiaráin	1-20 - 2-10	St. Oliver Plunkett's Eoghan Ruadh	O'Toole Park
12:30

Final	Na Fianna	v	St. Oliver Plunkett's Eoghan Ruadh

=== Quarter-finals ===
26 September 2014 Quarter-final	O'Toole's	1-20 - 0-13	Lucan Sarsfields	Parnell Park
18:45	C Carton 0-9 (0-6f), C Mulligan 1-4, A Morris 0-3, G O'Meara, M Carton, G Morris, P Bradshaw 0-1 each.	Report	T Somers 0-3 (0-3f), E Ó Conghaile, A Roche, A Duff 0-2 each, M May, J McCaffrey, C Crummey, T Lee 0-1 each.	Referee: G McGrath (Setanta).

26 September 2014 Quarter-final	Kilmacud Crokes	2-15 - 0-12	St. Vincent's	Parnell Park
20:15	S McGrath 0-6 (0-5f), R O'Dwyer 1-3, Ross O'Carroll 1-0, C Conway 0-2, D Mulligan, D Kelly, B O'Rorke, O O'Rorke 0-1 each.	Report	T McGrane 0-7 (0-5f, 0-1 '65'), J Hetherton 0-2 (0-1 pen), C McBride, A Moore, D Connolly 0-1 each.	Referee: J Brennan (Faughs).

28 September 2014 Quarter-final	St. Jude's	0-22 - 0-7	Faughs	O'Toole Park
14:30	F Ó Riain Broin 0-10 (0-8f, 0-1 ‘65’), D Sutcliffe 0-4, N Mangan, R Joyce 0-2 each, P Maguire (sideline), S Larkin, R Hardy (f), C Mangan 0-1 each.	Report	E McKenna 0-4 (0-3f), C Bennett, J Kelly, C Brennan 0-1 each.	Referee: M O’Connell (Croí Ró Naofa)

28 September 2014 Quarter-final	Cuala	0-14 - 0-15	Ballyboden St. Enda's	O'Toole Park
16:00	B Connolly 0-6 (0-5f), C Waldron 0-3, S Moran, P Butler 0-2, N Carthy 0-1.	Report	P Ryan 0-9 (0-6f, 0-1 ’65), D Curtin, N McMorrow 0-2 each, S Durkin, F McGarry 0-1 each.	Referee: D Harrington (St Sylvester’s).

=== Semi-finals ===
11 October 2014 Semi-final	O'Toole's	0-14 - 0-15	St. Jude's	Parnell Park
16:00	C Carton 0-10 (0-6f, 0-1 ‘65’, 0-1 pen), A Morris, G O’Meara, M Carton, C Mulligan 0-1 each.	Report	F Ó Riain Broin 0-5 (0-4f), D Sutcliffe 0-3, R Joyce, P Maguire (0-1 sideline) 0-2 each, M Maguire, T Devlin, S Larkin 0-1 each.	Referee: G McGrath (Setanta).

11 October 2014 Semi-final	Kilmacud Crokes	1-16 - 0-12	Ballyboden St. Enda's	Parnell Park
17:30	C Conway 0-6 (0-2f), S McGrath 1-2, D Kelly 0-3, O O’Rorke 0-2, R O’Dwyer, D Mulligan, N Corcoran 0-1 each.	Report	P Ryan 0-5 (0-4f, 0-1 ‘65’), C O’Neill, C Keaney 0-2 each, S Lambert, N McMorrow, C McCormack 0-1 each.	Referee: P Behan (Trinity Gaels).

=== Final ===
24 October 2014 Final	St. Jude's	1-15 - 2-16 (a.e.t.)	Kilmacud Crokes	Parnell Park
19:45	F O Riain Broin (0-10, 9f), P Maguire (1-0f), D Sutcliffe (0-3), R Joyce (0-1), J McManus (0-1).	Report	S McGrath (1-6, 0-4f, 0-1'65), Ross O'Carroll (1-0), R O'Dwyer (0-2), C MacGabhann (0-1), D Mulligan (0-1), D Kelly (0-1), C Conway (0-1), B O'Rorke (0-1), O O'Rorke (0-1), J Sweeney (0-1), J Burke (0-1).	Referee: D Harrington
