= Oisín O'Rorke =

Irish hurler

Personal information
- Native name: Oisín Ó Ruairc (Irish)
- Born: 1994 (age 31–32) Kilmacud, Dublin, Ireland
- Occupation: Teacher

Sport
- Sport: Hurling
- Position: Right corner-forward
Club
- Years: Club
- 2012–present: Kilmacud Crokes
Club titles
- Dublin titles: 5
College
- Years: College
- University College Dublin
College titles
- Fitzgibbon titles: 0
Inter-county
- Years: County
- 2015–2021: Dublin
Inter-county titles
- Leinster titles: 0
- All-Irelands: 0
- NHL: 0
- All Stars: 0

Oisín O'Rorke (born 1994) is an Irish hurler who plays at club level with Kilmacud Crokes. He is a former member of the Dublin senior hurling team.

== Career ==
Born and raised in Kilmacud, O'Rorke was part of the North Dublin amalgamation that lined out in the Leinster Colleges SAHC. During his university studies, he played with University College Dublin in the Fitzgibbon Cup.

At club level, O'Rorke first played for Kilmacud Crokes at juvenile and underage levels. He was part of the club's minor team that won three consecutive Dublin MAHC titles, with O'Rorke lining out in the 2010 and 2011 victories. He won a Dublin U21AHC title in 2015. O'Rorke had joined the Kilmacud senior team by that stage and won his first Dublin SHC medal in 2012. He claimed further such titles in 2014, 2021 and 2022. O'Rorke won a fifth Dublin SHC medal in 2026, after captaining Kilmacud to a 2–17 to 0–12 win over Cuala in the final.

O'Rorke first appeared on the inter-county scene for Dublin as a member of the minor team. He won consecutive Leinster MHC medals in 2011 and 2012, however, Dublin were subsequently beaten by Galway and Tipperary in the respective All-Ireland MHC finals. He later lined out with the under-21 team. O'Rorke made his senior team debut in 2015. He played a number of games until leaving the panel in 2021.

== Honours ==
Kilmacud Crokes

- Dublin Senior Hurling Championship (5): 2012, 2014, 2021, 2022, 2026 (c)
- Dublin Under-21 Hurling Championship (1): 2015
- Dublin Minor Hurling Championship (2): 2010, 2011

Dublin

- Leinster Minor Hurling Championship (2): 2011, 2012
