= David Treacy =

Irish hurler

Personal information
- Native name: Daithí Ó Treasaigh (Irish)
- Born: 21 November 1989 (age 36) Glenageary, Dublin, Ireland
- Occupation: Sponsorship account manager
- Height: 1.82 m (6 ft 0 in)

Sport
- Sport: Hurling
- Position: Left wing forward
Club
- Years: Club
- 2006–present: Cuala
Club titles
- Dublin titles: 3
- Leinster titles: 2
- All-Ireland Titles: 2
Inter-county*
Years	County	Apps (scores)
2009–2021	Dublin	37 (2-96)
Inter-county titles
- Leinster titles: 1
- All-Irelands: 0
- NHL: 1
- All Stars: 0
- *Inter County team apps and scores correct as of 22:30, 19 May 2019.

David Treacy (born 21 November 1989) is an Irish hurler who plays for Dublin Senior Championship club Cuala and formerly at inter-county level with the Dublin senior hurling team

Born in Glenageary, Treacy first played competitive hurling with the amalgamated Dublin Colleges team, winning an All-Ireland medal in 2006. He simultaneously came to prominence at juvenile and underage levels with the Cuala club, winning under-21 championship medals as a dual player. Treacy subsequently joined the Cuala senior team and has enjoyed much success, culminating with the winning of an All-Ireland medal in 2017. He has also won two Leinster medals and three county championship medals.

Treacy made his debut on the inter-county scene at the age of sixteen when he was selected for the Dublin minor teams in both codes. He enjoyed two championship seasons with the minor teams, Leinster medals as both a Gaelic footballer and as a hurler. He subsequently joined the Dublin under-21 hurling team, winning a Leinster medal in 2010. Treacy made his senior debut during the 2009 league and has been a regular member of the starting fifteen since then. He has won Leinster and National League medals.

== Career statistics ==
=== Club ===
As of match played 10 February 2018.

Team	Year	Leinster		All-Ireland		Total	
Team	Year	Apps	Score	Apps	Score	Apps	Score
Cuala	2015–16	3	0-28	0	0-00	3	0-28
Cuala	2016–17	3	0-24	2	0-17	5	0-41
Cuala	2017–18	3	0-25	1	0-07	1	0-32
Total		9	0-77	3	0-24	12	0-101

=== Inter-county ===
As of match played 19 May 2019.

Team	Year	National League			Leinster		All-Ireland		Total	
Team	Year	Division	Apps	Score	Apps	Score	Apps	Score	Apps	Score
Dublin	2009	Division 1	6	3-04	3	0-07	1	0-01	10	3-12
Dublin	2010	Division 1	6	0-08	1	0-00	1	0-00	8	0-08
Dublin	2011	Division 1	1	0-01	2	0-00	1	0-00	4	0-01
Dublin	2012	Division 1A	7	1-04	2	1-03	1	0-01	10	2-08
Dublin	2013	Division 1B	7	0-15	5	0-02	1	1-01	13	1-18
Dublin	2014	Division 1A	2	0-00	2	0-01	1	0-01	5	0-02
Dublin	2015	Division 1A	5	0-35	2	0-13	3	0-02	10	0-50
Dublin	2016	Division 1A	6	2-42	2	0-19	1	0-09	9	2-70
Dublin	2017	Division 1A	1	0-07	1	0-05	2	0-20	4	0-32
Dublin	2018	Division 1B	0	0-00	3	0-05	0	0-00	3	0-05
Dublin	2019	Division 1B	5	0-09	2	0-06	0	0-00	7	0-15
Total			46	6-125	25	1-61	12	1-35	83	8-221

== Personal life ==
Treacy is in a relationship with Sinéad Goldrick, the Dublin senior ladies' footballer.

== Honours ==
Dublin Colleges

- Dr. Croke Cup (1): 2006

Cuala

- All-Ireland Senior Club Hurling Championship (2): 2017, 2018
- Leinster Senior Club Hurling Championship (2): 2016, 2017,2018
- Dublin Senior Hurling Championship (3): 2015, 2016, 2017

Dublin

- Leinster Senior Hurling Championship (1): 2013
- National Hurling League (1): 2011
- Leinster Under-21 Hurling Championship (1): 2010
- Leinster Minor Hurling Championship (1): 2007
- Leinster Minor Football Championship (1): 2006
