= Oisín MacManus =

Irish hurler

Personal information
- Native name: Oisín Mac Mánais (Irish)
- Nickname: OMAC
- Born: 1997 (age 28–29) Leitrim, County Down, Northern Ireland
- Occupation: Sports physchologist

Sport
- Sport: Hurling
- Position: Right corner-forward
Clubs
- Years: Club
- Liatroim Fontenoys; St John's
Club titles
- Antrim titles: 1
Inter-county
- Years: County
- 2016-2024: Down
Inter-county titles
- All-Irelands: 0
- NHL: 0
- All Stars: 0

Oisín MacManus (born 1997) is a hurler from Northern Ireland. At club level he plays with St John's, and at inter-county level is a former member of the Down senior hurling team.

== Career ==
MacManus began his club hurling career with Liatroim Fontenoys; however, he transferred to the St John's club in Belfast in 2022. He won an Antrim SHC in 2025, after scoring 1–02 in the 2–16 to 1–18 win over Loughgiel Shamrocks in the final.

At inter-county level, MacManus first played for Down as a member of the minor team in 2014. He later spent four years with the under-21 team. MacManus made his senior team debut in 2016. He spent a number of years with the team, and was part of Down's National Hurling League Division 2B–winning team in 2020.

== Honours ==
St John's

- Antrim Senior Hurling Championship: 2025

Down

- National Hurling League Division 2B: 2020
