= 2017–18 All-Ireland Senior Club Hurling Championship =

All-Ireland Senior Club Hurling Championship 2017–18
Championship Details
- Dates: 8 October 2017 – 24 March 2018
- Teams: 17

All Ireland Champions
- Winners: Cuala (2nd win)
- Captain: Paul Schutte
- Manager: Mattie Kenny

All Ireland Runners-up
- Runners-up: Na Piarsaigh
- Captain: Cathal King
- Manager: Shane O'Neill

Provincial Champions
- Munster: Na Piarsaigh
- Leinster: Cuala
- Ulster: Slaughtneil
- Connacht: Not Played

Championship Statistics
- Matches Played: 17
- Total Goals: 45
- Total Points: 545
- Top Scorer: David Treacy (0–44)

The 2017–18 All-Ireland Senior Club Hurling Championship was the 48th staging of the All-Ireland Senior Club Hurling Championship, the Gaelic Athletic Association's premier inter-county club hurling tournament. The competition began on 8 October 2017 and ended on 24 March 2018.

The defending champion was Cuala of Dublin. Liam Mellows of Galway and Dicksboro of Kilkenny returned to the championship after long absences.

Cuala defeated Na Piarsaigh by 2–17 to 1–17 in the final replay on 24 March 2018 to win the competition. This was the club's second successive title.

Cuala's David Treacy was the competition's top scorer, finishing with 0–44.

== Format ==
County Championships

Ireland's counties play their county championships between their senior hurling clubs. Each county decides the format for determining their county champions. The format can be knockout, double-elimination, league, etc or a combination.

Only single club teams are allowed to enter the All-Ireland Club championship. If a team which is an amalgamation of two or more clubs or a university team wins a county's championship, a club team will represent that county in the provincial championship as determined by that county's championship rules (normally it is the club team that exited the championship at the highest stage).

Provincial Championships

Leinster, Munster and Ulster organise a provincial championship for their participating county champions. Connacht discontinued their senior club championship after 2007. They do organise intermediate and junior championships and are represented in the All-Ireland senior club semi-finals by the Galway champions. Some counties enter their senior clubs in the All-Ireland intermediate club championship (tier 2) as it is recognised that club hurling is weak in those counties.

All matches are knock-out. Two ten minute periods of extra time are played each way if it's a draw at the end of normal time.

All-Ireland

The two semi-finals are usually played on a Saturday in early February. The All-Ireland Club SHC final is traditionally played at Croke Park on 17 March (St Patrick's Day).

All matches are knock-out. If it's a draw at the end of normal time in the semi-finals or final, two ten minute periods of extra time are played each way. If the score is still level at the end of extra time the match is replayed.

Initial Schedule

County championships April 2017 to November 2017
Provincial championships October 2017 to December 2017
All-Ireland semi-finals early February 2018
All-Ireland final 17 March 2018

== Team summaries ==
Team	County	Captain(s)	Manager	Most recent success		
Team	County	Captain(s)	Manager	All-Ireland	Provincial	County
Ballygalget	Down	Ben Toner	Paddy Monan		2005	2016
Ballygunner	Waterford	Shane Walsh	Fergal Hartley		2001	2016
Blackrock	Cork	Stephen Murphy	Fergal Ryan		1979	2002
Camross	Laois	Zane Keenan; Joe Phelan	Arien Delaney		1996	2016
Castletown Geoghegan	Westmeath	Liam Varley	Éamonn Gallagher		2012	2016
Cuala	Dublin	Paul Schutte	Mattie Kenny	2017	2016	2016
Dicksboro	Kilkenny	Ollie Walsh	Mark Dowling			1993
Dunloy	Antrim	James McKeague	Gregory O'Kane		2009	2009
Kilcormac/Killoughey	Offaly	Peter Healion	Stephen Byrne		2012	2013
Liam Mellows	Galway	David Collins; Aonghus Callanan	Louis Mulqueen		1970	1970
Lisbellaw	Fermanagh					2016
Mount Leinster Rangers	Carlow	Edward Coady	Brendan Fennelly		2013	2013
Na Piarsaigh	Limerick	Cathal King	Shane O'Neill	2016	2015	2015
Sixmilebridge	Clare	Páidí Fitzpatrick	John O'Meara	1996	2000	2015
Slaughtneil	Derry	Chrissy McKaigue	Michael McShane		2016	2016
St. Martin's	Wexford	Patrick O'Connor; Ciarán Lyng	Tomás Codd			2008
Thurles Sarsfields	Tipperary	Pádraic Maher	Tommy Maher		2012	2016

== County Finals ==
=== Leinster County Finals ===
Carlow SHC

15 October 2017
3.45pm

Mount Leinster Rangers	3–17 – 0–17	Naomh Eoin
	Report

Dr. Cullen Park
Referee: Pat Kehoe (Rathvilly)

Dublin SHC

28 October 2017; 3:30 pm	Cuala	1–13 – 0–13	Kilmacud Crokes	Parnell Park; Attendance: 3,000; Referee: Finbar Gaffney (Na Fianna)
28 October 2017; 3:30 pm	David Treacy 0–6 (0-4f, 1 '65), Darragh O'Connell 1–0, Con O'Callaghan 0–3, Colm Cronin 0–2, Colum Sheanon and Mark Schutte 0–1 each	Report	Oisin O'Rorke 0–7 (0-5f), Fergal Whitely 0–3, Ross O'Carroll, Lorcan McMullan, Sean McGrath 0–1 each	Parnell Park; Attendance: 3,000; Referee: Finbar Gaffney (Na Fianna)

Kilkenny SHC

29 October 2017; 3:15 pm	Dicksboro	4–15 – 4–10	James Stephens	Nowlan Park; Attendance: 7,453; Referee: Michael O'Sullivan (Ballyhale Shamrocks); Man of the Match: Robbie Fitzpatrick
29 October 2017; 3:15 pm	Oisin Gough 2–0, Bill Sheehan 1–3, Shane Stapleton 0–5 (0-4f, 1 '65), Martin Gaffney 1–1, Ollie Walsh 0–2, Thomas Kenny, Aidan Nolan, Robbie Fitzpatrick, Paul O'Flynn 0–1 each	Report	David Walton 1–5 (0-5f), Luke Scanlon, Matthew Ruth, Tadhg Dwyer 1–1 each, Mikey Drennan 0–2	Nowlan Park; Attendance: 7,453; Referee: Michael O'Sullivan (Ballyhale Shamrocks); Man of the Match: Robbie Fitzpatrick

Laois SHC

24 September 2017
4:00 pm

Camross	3–14 – 1–19	Clough-Ballacolla
	Report

O'Moore Park
Referee: Anthony Stapleton (Rathdowney-Errill)

Offaly SHC

1 October 2017; 3:45 pm	Kilcormac/Killoughey	2–16 – 1–16	St Rynagh's	O'Connor Park, Tullamore; Attendance: 6,117; Referee: Richie Fitzsimons (Birr); Man of the Match: Ciaran Slevin
1 October 2017; 3:45 pm	Ciaran Slevin 1–7 (0-5f), Thomas Geraghty 1–1, Daniel Currams 0–3, Enda Grogan, Cillian Kiely (0-1f), James Gorman, Stephen Leonard, Peter Healion 0–1 each	Report	Stephen Quirke 0–7 (0-6f), Aidan Treacy 0–4 (0-3f, 1 '65), Sean Dolan 0–3, Joseph O'Connor 1–0, Ger Scales and Ronan Hughes 0–1 each	O'Connor Park, Tullamore; Attendance: 6,117; Referee: Richie Fitzsimons (Birr); Man of the Match: Ciaran Slevin

Westmeath SHC

1 October 2017
3:30 pm

Castletown Geoghegan	1–18 – 1–16	Raharney
	Report

Cusack Park (Mullingar)
Referee: Mick Murtagh (The Downs)

Wexford SHC

22 October 2017; 3:30 pm	St. Martin's	2–16 – 1–9	Oulart the Ballagh	Wexford Park; Referee: James Owens (Kilrush/Askamore); Man of the Match: Daithi Waters
22 October 2017; 3:30 pm	Ciaran Lyng 1–2, Rory O'Connor 0–5 (0-4f), Joe O'Connor 1–1, Joe Coleman 0–3, Jake Firman 0–2, Daithi Waters, Paidi Kelly, Jack O'Connor 0–1 each	Report	Nicky Kirwan 0-6f, Garrett Sinnott 1–0, Kevin Sheridan, David Redmond, Rory Jacob 0–1 each	Wexford Park; Referee: James Owens (Kilrush/Askamore); Man of the Match: Daithi Waters

=== Munster County Finals ===
Clare SHC

15 October 2017; 3:30 pm	Sixmilebridge	0–19 – 1–16	Clooney-Quin	Cusack Park; Attendance: 5,455; Referee: Ambrose Heagney (Corofin); Man of the Match: Keith Hogan
15 October 2017; 3:30 pm	Jamie Shanahan 0–9 (0-3f, 2 '65), Seadna Morey 0–3, Brian Corry and Alex Morey (0-2f) 0–2 each, Caimin Morey, Shane Golden, Niall Giliigan 0–1 each	Report	Peter Duggan 0–10 (0-8f, 1 '65), Ronan O’Donnell 1–1, Fergal Lynch 0–1, Ryan Taylor and Michael Corry 0–2 each, Fergal Lynch 0–1	Cusack Park; Attendance: 5,455; Referee: Ambrose Heagney (Corofin); Man of the Match: Keith Hogan

22 October 2017; 3:30 pm Replay	Sixmilebridge	1–20 – 1–14	Clooney-Quin	Cusack Park; Attendance: 5,892; Referee: Rory Hickey (Éire Óg); Man of the Match: Seadna Morey
22 October 2017; 3:30 pm Replay	Jamie Shanahan (0-3f) and Shane Golden 0–5 each, Brian Corry 1–1, Alan Mulready 0–3, Niall Gilligan 0–2, Aidan Quilligan, Conor Deasy, Cathal Malone, Cathal Lynch 0–1 each	Report	Peter Duggan 0–10 (0-6f, 2 '65, 1 sl), Michael Corry 1–1, Ryan Taylor, Fergal Lynch, Jimmy Corry 0–1 each	Cusack Park; Attendance: 5,892; Referee: Rory Hickey (Éire Óg); Man of the Match: Seadna Morey

Cork SHC

22 October 2017; 4:00 pm	Imokilly	3–13 – 0–18	Blackrock	Páirc Uí Chaoimh; Attendance: 16,226; Referee: Colm Lyons (Nemo Rangers); Man of the Match: Ger Millerick
22 October 2017; 4:00 pm	Seamus Harnedy 1–1, William Leahy 0-4f, Cian Fleming and Brian Mulcahy 1–0, Mark O'Keeffe, Brain Lawton (1 sl), Paudie O'Sullivan 0–2 each, John Cronin and Ger Millerick 0–1 each	Report	Michael O'Halloran 0–8 (0-6f), Alan O'Callaghan 0–3 (0-2f), Ciaran Cormack 0–2, David O'Farrell, Shane O'Keeffe, Ger Regan, Daniel Meaney, Tadhg Deasy 0–1 each	Páirc Uí Chaoimh; Attendance: 16,226; Referee: Colm Lyons (Nemo Rangers); Man of the Match: Ger Millerick

- As Imokilly are an amalgamation team, Blackrock proceed to the Munster Club Championship

Limerick SHC

15 October 2017; 3:30 pm	Na Piarsaigh	1–22 – 2–14	Kilmallock	Gaelic Grounds; Referee: Donnacha O’Callaghan (Feohanagh); Man of the Match: Adrian Breen
15 October 2017; 3:30 pm	Adrian Breen 0–6, Shane Dowling 0-5f, David Dempsey 1–2, Kevin Downes 0–3, Ronan Lynch 0–2 (0-1f), Tommy Grimes, Alan Dempsey, David Breen, Peter Casey 0–1 each	Report	Graeme Mulcahy 1–4, Jake Mulcahy 1–1, Kevin O'Donnell 0–3, Eoin Ryan 0-2f, Paudie O'Brien, Gavin O'Mahony, Michael Houlihan, Robbie Hanley 0–1 each	Gaelic Grounds; Referee: Donnacha O’Callaghan (Feohanagh); Man of the Match: Adrian Breen

Tipperary SHC

8 October 2017; 3:30 pm	Thurles Sarsfields	1–24 – 0–11	Borris-Ileigh	Semple Stadium; Attendance: 8,376; Referee: Fergal Horgan (Knockavilla Kickhams); Man of the Match: Pádraic Maher
8 October 2017; 3:30 pm	Aidan McCormack 0–9 (6f, 1 '65), Conor Stakelum 1–2, Billy McCarthy and Denis Maher 0–3 each, Pa Bourke and Lar Corbett 0–2 each, Ronan Maher, Pádraic Maher, Stephen Cahill 0–1 each	Report	Brendan Maher 0-5f, Dan McCormack 0–3, Liam Ryan 0–2, Kieran Maher 0–1	Semple Stadium; Attendance: 8,376; Referee: Fergal Horgan (Knockavilla Kickhams); Man of the Match: Pádraic Maher

Waterford SHC

22 October 2017; 3:00 pm	Ballygunner	2–18 – 0–16	De La Salle	Walsh Park; Referee: Thomas O'Sullivan (Cappoquin); Man of the Match: Philip Mahony
22 October 2017; 3:00 pm	Pauric Mahony 0–9 (0-7f), Conor Power 2–0, David O'Sullivan 0–3, Brian O'Sullivan 0–2, Shane Walsh, Shane O'Sullivan, Peter Hogan, Billy O'Keefe 0–1 each	Report	Shane Ryan 0-8f, Jack Fagan 0–3 (0-1f, 1 sl), Kevin Moran, Paidi Nevin, Adam Farrell, John Mullane, Thomas Douglas (0-1f) 0–1 each	Walsh Park; Referee: Thomas O'Sullivan (Cappoquin); Man of the Match: Philip Mahony

=== Ulster County Finals ===
Antrim SHC

24 September 2017
3.15pm
Final

Dunloy	2–15 – 2–9	Cushendall
Paul Shiels 0–7 (6 frees, 1 ’65); Nigel Elliott 1–1; Conal Cunning 1–1; Eoin O’Neill 0–2; Gabriel McTaggart, Keelan Molloy, Nicky McKeague, Ally Dooey 0–1 each	Report	Conor Carson 1–2; Paddy Burke 1–0; Neil McManus 0–3 (3 frees); Fergus McCambridge 0–2; Paddy McGill & Eoghan Campbell 0–1

Ballycastle
Referee: Mark O'Neill

Derry SHC

16 September 2017
Final

Slaughtneil	2–18 – 0–14	Banagher
Brendan Rogers 0–7 (0-5f), Sé McGuigan and Brian Cassidy 1–1 each, Cormac O'Doherty 0–3 (0-1f), Sean Cassidy 0–2, Karl McKaigue, Shane McGuigan, Conor McAllister, Mark McGuigan 0–1 each	Report	Darragh Cartin 0-9f, Darragh McCloskey, Mark Lynch, Sean McCullagh, Shane Delaney, Shane Farren (0-1f) 0–1 each

Celtic Park
Referee: Tarlach Conway (Ballinascreen)

Down SHC

24 September 2017
3:00 pm
Final

Ballygalget	2–13 – 2–12	Portaferry

Ballycran
Referee: Colin Murray

=== Galway County Final ===
Galway SHC

3 December 2017; 2:00 pm	Liam Mellows	3–12 – 1–15	Gort	Pearse Stadium, Salthill; Referee: Christy Browne; Man of the Match: Adrian Morrissey
3 December 2017; 2:00 pm	Adrian Morrissey 0–8 (0-7f), Tadhg Haran 1–2 (0-2sl), Aonghus Callanan 1–1, Conor Kavanagh 1–0, Ronan Elwood 0–1.	Report	Aidan Helebert 0–10 (0-7f), Richard Cummins 1–0, Greg Lally 0–2 (0-2f), Albert Mullins 0–1, Jason Grealish 0–1, Kaelen Higgins 0–1.	Pearse Stadium, Salthill; Referee: Christy Browne; Man of the Match: Adrian Morrissey

== Leinster ==
=== Quarter-finals ===
5 November 2017; 14:00; Quarter-final	Kilcormac/Killoughey	2–15 – 1–12	Castletown Geoghegan	O'Connor Park, Tullamore; Referee: J Heffernan (Wexford)
5 November 2017; 14:00; Quarter-final	Ciarán Slevin 0–8 (0-6f), Peter Healion and Daniel Currams 1–0 each, James Gorman 0–3, Cilian Kiely 0–2, Thomas Geraghty and Peter Geraghty 0–1 each	Report	Niall O'Brien 1–8 (1–0 pen, 0-3f, 1 sl), Shane Clavin 0–2, Joe Clarke and Plunkett Maxwell 0–1 each	O'Connor Park, Tullamore; Referee: J Heffernan (Wexford)

5 November 2017; 14:00; Quarter-final	Camross	0–13 – 0–19	Mount Leinster Rangers	O'Moore Park; Referee: J Owens (Wexford)
5 November 2017; 14:00; Quarter-final	Zane Keenan 0–8 (0-5f, 1 '65), Niall Holmes 0–2, Damien Keenan, Dean Delaney, Mark Dowling 0–1 each	Report	Denis Murphy 0–6 (0-4f), Chris Nolan 0–4 (0-1f), Ted Joyce 0–3, Paul Coady 0–2, Frank Foley (0-1f), Diarmid Byrne, Derek Byrne, John Coady 0–1 each	O'Moore Park; Referee: J Owens (Wexford)

5 November 2017; 14:00; Quarter-final	Cuala	2–20 – 1–16	Dicksboro	Parnell Park; Referee: P Murphy (Carlow); Man of the Match: Darragh O'Connell
5 November 2017; 14:00; Quarter-final	David Treacy 0–9 (0-8f), Con O'Callaghan 1–3, Jake Malone 1–0, Colm Cronin 0–3, Nicky Kenny and Niall Carty 0–2 each, Darragh O'Connell 0–1	Report	Shane Stapleton 0–8 (0-5f, 3 '65), Stephen Farrell 1–0, Eoin Gough, Oisin Gough, Robbie Murphy 0–2 each, Ollie Walsh and Martin Gaffney 0–1 each	Parnell Park; Referee: P Murphy (Carlow); Man of the Match: Darragh O'Connell

=== Semi-finals ===
19 November 2017; 2:00 pm Semi-final	Kilcormac–Killoughey	2–21 – 0–10	Mount Leinster Rangers	O'Connor Park, Tullamore; Referee: J O'Brien (Laois)
19 November 2017; 2:00 pm Semi-final	James Gorman 1–5, Daniel Currams 1–3, Ciaran Slevin 0-5f, Conor Mahon 0–3, Peter Geraghty 0–2, Cillian Kiely, Thomas Geraghty, Stephen Leonard 0–1 each	Report	Chris Nolan 0–4 (0-2f), Diarmuid Byrne 0–2 (0-1f), Paul Coady, Denis Murphy, Ted Joyce, Jon Nolan 0–1 each	O'Connor Park, Tullamore; Referee: J O'Brien (Laois)

19 November 2017; 2:00 pm Semi-final	Cuala	3–17 – 0–15	St Martin's	Parnell Park; Referee: David Hughes (Erin's Own Bagenalstown); Man of the Match: Con O'Callaghan
19 November 2017; 2:00 pm Semi-final	David Treacy 0–6 (0-4f, 1 '65), Con O'Callaghan 1–3, Jake Malone and Colm Cronin 1–1 each, Nicky Kenny 0–3, Colum Sheanon, Niall Carty, Brian Fitzgerald 0–1 each	Report	Joe Coleman 0–11 (0-8f, 1 sl), Daithi Waters, Joe O'Connor, Jack O'Connor, Darren Codd 0–1 each	Parnell Park; Referee: David Hughes (Erin's Own Bagenalstown); Man of the Match: Con O'Callaghan

=== Final ===
3 December 2017; 2:00 pm Final	Cuala	1–23 – 1–09	Kilcormac–Killoughey	O'Moore Park; Attendance: 3,344; Referee: S Cleere (Kilkenny); Man of the Match: Seán Moran
3 December 2017; 2:00 pm Final	D Treacy 0–10 (0-9f, 1 '65), C O'Callaghan 1–2, C Cronin and C Sheanon 0–3 each, D O'Connell 0–2 (0-1f), J Malone, C Waldron, B Fitzgerald 0–1 each	Report	C Slevin 0–4 (0-3f), C Mahon 1–0, T Geraghty and P Geraghty 0–2 each, D Currams 0–1	O'Moore Park; Attendance: 3,344; Referee: S Cleere (Kilkenny); Man of the Match: Seán Moran

== Munster ==
=== Quarter-final ===
29 October 2017; 14:00; Quarter-final	Ballygunner	1–21 – 1–19 (aet)	Thurles Sarsfields	Walsh Park, Waterford; Attendance: 2,864; Referee: C Lyons (Nemo Rangers)
29 October 2017; 14:00; Quarter-final	P Mahony (1–11, 1–6 frees); P Hogan, D. O'Sullivan (0–2 each); Brian O'Sullivan, Barry O'Sullivan, C Power, S O'Sullivan, D Walsh, JJ Hutchinson (0–1 each).	Report	L Corbett (0–4); C Stakelum (1–0); D Maher, A McCormack (0–1 free), P Bourke (0–2 frees) (0–3 each); P Maher, S Lillis (0–2 each); S Cahill, B McCarthy (0–1 each).	Walsh Park, Waterford; Attendance: 2,864; Referee: C Lyons (Nemo Rangers)

=== Semi-finals ===
5 November 2017; 14:00; Semi-final	Ballygunner	1–18 – 1–17	Sixmilebridge	Walsh Park, Waterford; Attendance: 2,490; Referee: J Murphy (Limerick)
5 November 2017; 14:00; Semi-final	P Mahony 0–11 (0-9f, 1 '65), JJ Hutchinson 1–3, B O'Keefe 0–3, S O'Sullivan 0–1	Report	J Shanahan 0–9 (0-6f), S Morey 1–0, N Gilligan 0–2, C Deasy, C Malone, A Morey, B Corry, S Golden, A Mulready 0–1 each	Walsh Park, Waterford; Attendance: 2,490; Referee: J Murphy (Limerick)

5 November 2017; 14:00; Semi-final	Na Piarsaigh	2–26 – 0–10	Blackrock	Gaelic Grounds; Attendance: 1,326; Referee: J Ryan (Tipperary)
5 November 2017; 14:00; Semi-final	R Lynch 0–15 (0-9f, 2 '65, 1 sl), P Casey 1–3, A Breen 0–3, D Breen 1–0, N Buckley, W O'Donoghue, C Boylan, K Downes, K Ryan 0–1 each	Report	M O'Halloran 0-4f, D O'Farrell, D Cashman, A O'Callaghan, G Regan, J O’Sullivan, L O’Sullivan 0–1 each	Gaelic Grounds; Attendance: 1,326; Referee: J Ryan (Tipperary)

=== Final ===
19 November 2017; 14:00; Final	Na Piarsaigh	3–15 – 2–10	Ballygunner	Semple Stadium, Thurles; Attendance: 3,319; Referee: R McGann (Clare); Man of the Match: Adrian Breen
19 November 2017; 14:00; Final	A Breen 1–5, D Breen 2–0, R Lynch (2 sl, 1 '65) and P Casey 0–3 each, K Downes 0–2, T Grimes and C Boylan 0–1 each	Report	P Hogan 1–2, B O’Keeffe 0–4 (0-1f), C Power 1–0, D O’Sullivan and P Mahony (0-1f) 0–2 each	Semple Stadium, Thurles; Attendance: 3,319; Referee: R McGann (Clare); Man of the Match: Adrian Breen

== Ulster ==
=== Semi-finals ===
8 October 2017; 14:30; Semi-final	Slaughtneil	1–18 – 2–08	Dunloy	Owenbeg, Dungiven; Attendance: 6,142; Referee: James Clarke (Cavan); Man of the Match: Gerald Bradley
8 October 2017; 14:30; Semi-final	Cormac O'Doherty 0–11 (0-5f, 1 '65), Brendan Rodgers 1–2, Brian Cassidy 0–2, Chrissy McKaigue, Gerald Bradley, Sé McGuigan 0–1 each	Report	Paul Shiels 1–4 (0-4f), Nigel Elliott 1–0, Gabriel McTaggert, Keelan Molloy, Eoin O'Neill, Nicky McKeague (0-1f) 0–1 each	Owenbeg, Dungiven; Attendance: 6,142; Referee: James Clarke (Cavan); Man of the Match: Gerald Bradley

8 October 2017; 14:30; Semi-final	Ballygalget	2–26 – 0–08	Lisbellaw	Corrigan Park, Belfast; Referee: B Winters (Tyrone)
8 October 2017; 14:30; Semi-final	C Bailie (1–6, 2f), D Toner (0–5), M Fisher (0–4, 2f); C Coulter (0–4, 2f), D Doran (1–0), D McManus (0–2), G Johnston (0-2f), J Doran (0–1); J McManus (0–1), C Doran (0–1).	Report	R Bogue (0–4, 1f, 0–1 sideline), S Corrigan (0-3f), D Bannon (0–1)	Corrigan Park, Belfast; Referee: B Winters (Tyrone)

=== Final ===
22 October 2017; 16:00; Final	Slaughtneil	2–21 – 1–12	Ballygalget	Athletic Grounds, Armagh; Attendance: 3,500; Referee: Colum Cunning (Dunloy); Man of the Match: Karl McKaigue
22 October 2017; 16:00; Final	Cormac O'Doherty 1–10 (0-7f, 2 '65), Brian Cassidy 0–4, Sean Cassidy 1–0, Karl McKaigue 0–3, Brendan Rogers 0–2, Conor McAllister and Gerald Bradley 0–1 each	Report	G Johnston 0–8 (0-7f), C Bailie 1–0, M Fisher and D Toner 0–2 each	Athletic Grounds, Armagh; Attendance: 3,500; Referee: Colum Cunning (Dunloy); Man of the Match: Karl McKaigue

== Semi-finals ==
10 February 2018
14:00
Semi-final

Na Piarsaigh	3–15 – 3–08	Slaughtneil
R Lynch (0–14, 0-11f), C Boylan (1-00), S Dowling (1–00), K Downes (1-00), P Casey (0-01).	Report	C O'Doherty (1-03, 1-00pen, 0-02f), B Cassidy (1-02), G Bradley (1–0), C McKaigue (0-01), M McGrath (0-01), B Rodgers (0-01).

Parnell Park, Dublin
Referee: John Keenan (Wicklow)
10 February 2018
16:00
Semi-final

Cuala	1–17 – 0–11	Liam Mellows
D Treacy 0–7 (4f, 1 ’65), Con O'Callaghan 0–4, B Fitzgerald 1–0, M Schutte, D O'Connell, S Treacy, C Sheanon, N Kenny, N Carty 0–1 each.	Report	A Morrissey 0–7 (7f), A Callanan 0–2, C Kavanagh, T Haran (f) 0–1 each.

Semple Stadium, Thurles
Referee: Paud O'Dwyer (Carlow)

== Final ==
Saturday, 17 March 2018
3:45 pm
Final

Na Piarsaigh	2–19 – 1–22 (aet)	Cuala
S Dowling 0–6 (4f), P Casey 1–2, A Breen, K Downes 0–4 each, D Breen 1–1, D Dempsey 0–2.	Report	D Treacy 0–12 (12f), S Treacy 0–3, S Moran 1–0 (pen), D O’Connell, C Cronin, C Sheanon, M Schütte, Con O’Callaghan, N Kenny 0–1 each.

Croke Park, Dublin
Referee: Colm Lyons (Nemo Rangers)
Saturday, 24 March 2018
5:30 pm
Final replay

Na Piarsaigh	1–17 – 2–17	Cuala
S Dowling 0–5 (0-4f), A Breen 0–5, K Downes 0–2, P Casey 0–2, J Boylan 0–1, G Brown 0–1, D Dempsey 0–1.	Report	D Treacy 0–9 (0-7f, 0–1 65), M Schutte 1–2, N Kenny 1–0 C O’Callaghan 0–2, J Malone 0–1, J Sheanon 0–1, S Moran 0–1 (0-1f), D O’Connell 0–1.

O'Moore Park, Portlaoise
Referee: Paud O'Dwyer (Carlow)

== Statistics ==
=== Top scorers ===
Overall

Rank	Player	Club	Tally	Total	Matches	Average
1	David Treacy	Cuala	0–53	53	6	8.83
2	Ronan Lynch	Na Piarsaigh	0–32	32	5	6.40
3	Cormac O'Doherty	Slaughtneil	2–24	30	3	10.00
4	Pauric Mahony	Ballygunner	1–24	27	3	9.00
5	Con O'Callaghan	Cuala	3–15	24	6	4.00
6	Adrian Breen	Na Piarsaigh	1–17	20	5	4.00
7	Peter Casey	Na Piarsaigh	2–11	17	5	3.40
7	Ciarán Slevin	Kilcormac–Killoughey	0–17	17	3	5.66
8	Shane Dowling	Na Piarsaigh	1–11	14	3	4.66
9	Caolan Bailie	Ballygalget	2-06	12	2	6.00
9	Kevin Downes	Na Piarsaigh	1-09	12	5	2.40

Single game

Rank	Player	Club	Tally	Total	Opposition
1	Ronan Lynch	Na Piarsaigh	0–15	15	Blackrock
2	Pauric Mahony	Ballygunner	1–11	14	Thurles Sarsfields
2	Ronan Lynch	Na Piarsaigh	0–14	14	Slaughtneil
3	Cormac O'Doherty	Slaughtneil	1–10	13	Ballygalget
4	David Treacy	Cuala	0–12	12	Na Piarsaigh
5	Niall O'Brien	Castletown Geoghegan	1-08	11	Kilcormac–Killoughey
5	Cormac O'Doherty	Slaughtneil	0–11	11	Dunloy
5	Pauric Mahony	Ballygunner	0–11	11	Sixmilebridge
5	Joe Coleman	St Martin's	0–11	11	Cuala
6	David Treacy	Cuala	0–10	10	Kilcormac–Killoughey

== Awards ==
The Club Player Awards were initiated in 2018. Below is the first selection from hurling.

Team of the Year

1. Seán Brennan
2. Mike Casey
3. Cian O'Callaghan
4. Alan Dempsey
5. Cathal King
6. Seán Moran^{HOTY}
7. Philip Mahony
8. Darragh O'Connell
9. Ronan Lynch
10. David Treacy
11. Brendan Rogers
12. Adrian Morrissey
13. Adrian Breen
14. Kevin Downes
15. Con O'Callaghan

Hurler of the Year

- Seán Moran (Club)

Also nominated: PLAYER NAME (Club) & PLAYER NAME (Club)
