= Leinster Senior Club Hurling Championship =

Hurling competition in Ireland

- Current season or competition: 2026 Leinster Senior Club Hurling Championship
- Irish: Craobh Iománaíochta Sinsir Laighean na gClub
- Code: Hurling
- Founded: 1970; 56 years ago
- Region: Leinster (GAA)
- Trophy: O'Neill Cup
- No. of teams: 8
- Title holders: St Martin's (1st title)
- Most titles: Ballyhale Shamrocks (12 titles)
- Sponsors: Allied Irish Banks
- TV partner: TG4

The Leinster Senior Club Hurling Championship (known for sponsorship reasons as the AIB Leinster GAA Hurling Senior Club Championship; abbreviated as the Leinster Club SHC) is an annual hurling competition organised by the Leinster Council of the Gaelic Athletic Association and contested by the champion senior clubs in the province of Leinster in Ireland. It is the most prestigious club competition in Leinster hurling.

Introduced in 1971, it was initially a straight knockout tournament open to all 12 county senior champions from the 1970 championship season. The competition is currently limited to the eight champion club teams from the strongest hurling counties in Leinster.

In its current format, the Leinster Club Championship begins in November following the completion of the individual county championships. The eight participating teams compete in a single-elimination tournament which culminates with the final match on the first Sunday in December. The winner of the Leinster Club Championship, as well as being presented with the O'Neill Cup, qualifies for the subsequent All-Ireland Club Championship.

The competition has been won by 18 teams, 10 of which have won it more than once. Kilkenny clubs have accumulated the highest number of victories with 23 wins. Ballyhale Shamrocks is the most successful team in the tournament's history, having won it 12 times.

St Martin's are the reigning champions, having beaten Ballyhale Shamrocks by 0-24 to 2-17 in the 2025 final.

== Format ==
=== Overview ===
The Leinster Championship is a single elimination tournament. Each team is afforded only one defeat before being eliminated from the championship. Pairings for matches are drawn at random and there is no seeding.

Each match is played as a single leg. If a match is drawn there is a period of extra time, however, if both sides are still level at the end of extra time a replay takes place and so on until a winner is found.

=== Format ===
Quarter-finals: Eight teams contest this round. The four winning teams advance directly to the semi-final stage. The four losing teams are eliminated from the championship.

Semi-finals: The two winning teams advance directly to the final. The two losing teams are eliminated from the championship.

Final: The final is contested by the two semi-final winners.

== Teams ==
=== Qualification ===
County	Championship	Qualifying team
Carlow	Carlow Senior Hurling Championship	Champions
Dublin	Dublin Senior Hurling Championship	Champions
Kildare	Kildare Senior Hurling Championship	Champions
Kilkenny	Kilkenny Senior Hurling Championship	Champions
Laois	Laois Senior Hurling Championship	Champions
Offaly	Offaly Senior Hurling Championship	Champions
Westmeath	Westmeath Senior Hurling Championship	Champions
Wexford	Wexford Senior Hurling Championship	Champions

== Managers ==
Managers in the Leinster Championship are involved in the day-to-day running of the team, including the training, team selection, and sourcing of players. Their influence varies from club-to-club and is related to the individual club committees. The manager is assisted by a team of two or three selectors and a backroom team consisting of various coaches.

Winning managers
Manager	Team	Wins	Winning years
Pad Joe Whelehan	Birr	5	1997, 1999, 2001, 2002, 2007
Adrian Finan	James Stephens	2	2004, 2005
Maurice Aylward	Ballyhale Shamrocks	2	2006, 2008
Mattie Kenny	Cuala	2	2016, 2017
Henry Shefflin	Ballyhale Shamrocks	2	2018, 2019
Pádraig Horan	Birr	1	1994
Tom Ryan	Glenmore	1	1995
Frank Keenan	Camross	1	1996
Dan Quigley	Rathnure	1	1986,1987,1998
Jim Neary	Graigue-Ballycallan	1	2000
Michael Nolan	O'Loughlin Gaels	1	2003
Mick Fennelly	Ballyhale Shamrocks	1	2009
Michael Nolan	O'Loughlin Gaels	1	2010
Ken Hogan	Coolderry	1	2011
Danny Owens	Kilcormac–Killoughey	1	2012
Tom Mullally	Mount Leinster Rangers	1	2013
Andy Moloney	Ballyhale Shamrocks	1	2014
Frank Flannery	Oulart–The Ballagh	1	2015
James O' Connor	Ballyhale Shamrocks	1	2021
Pat Hoban	Ballyhale Shamrocks	1	2022

== Qualification for subsequent competitions ==
The Leinster Senior Club Hurling Championship winners qualify for the subsequent All-Ireland Senior Club Hurling Championship. The winners contest the All-Ireland semi-finals with the other three provincial representatives.

== Titles listed by club ==
#	Club	County	Wins	Runners Up	Years won	Years runners up
1	Ballyhale Shamrocks	Kilkenny	12	3	1978, 1980, 1983, 1989, 2006, 2008, 2009, 2014, 2018, 2019, 2021, 2022	1988, 1991, 2025
2	Birr	Offaly	7	3	1991, 1994, 1997, 1999, 2001, 2002, 2007	2003, 2006, 2008
3	Rathnure	Wexford	6	2	1971, 1973, 1977, 1986, 1987, 1998	1970, 1972
4	St. Rynagh's	Offaly	4	4	1970, 1972, 1982, 1993	1973, 1974, 1975, 1992
4	James Stephens	Kilkenny	4	1	1975, 1981, 2004, 2005	1976
6	Buffer's Alley	Wexford	3	1	1985, 1988, 1992	1982
6	O'Loughlin Gaels	Kilkenny	3	1	2003, 2010, 2023	2016
8	Camross	Laois	2	3	1976, 1996	1979, 1986, 1990
8	Cuala	Dublin	2	2	2016, 2017	1989, 2015
8	Glenmore	Kilkenny	2	0	1990, 1995	-
11	Oulart–The Ballagh	Wexford	1	6	2015	1994, 1995, 2010, 2011, 2012, 2013
11	Kilcormac–Killoughey	Offaly	1	3	2012	2014, 2017, 2024
11	The Fenians	Kilkenny	1	1	1974	1977
11	Crumlin	Dublin	1	1	1979	1978
11	Coolderry	Offaly	1	1	2011	1980
11	Na Fianna	Dublin	1	1	2024	2023
11	St. Martin's	Kilkenny	1	0	1984	
11	Graigue-Ballycallan	Kilkenny	1	0	2000	
11	Mount Leinster Rangers	Carlow	1	0	2013	
11	St Martin's	Wexford	1	0	2025	
21	Kinnitty	Offaly	0	3		1983, 1984, 1985
21	Castletown	Laois	0	3		1997, 1999, 2001
21	University College Dublin	Dublin	0	3		2000, 2004, 2005
21	Portlaoise	Laois	0	2		1987, 1998
21	Ballyboden St. Enda's	Dublin	0	2		2007, 2018
21	Bennettsbridge	Kilkenny	0	1		1971
21	Faythe Harriers	Wexford	0	1		1981
21	Dicksboro	Kilkenny	0	1		1993
21	O'Toole's	Dublin	0	1		1996
21	Young Irelands	Kilkenny	0	1		2002
21	Tullamore	Offaly	0	1		2009
21	St. Mullin's	Carlow	0	1		2019
21	Clough–Ballacolla	Laois	0	1		2021
21	Kilmacud Crokes	Dublin	0	1		2022

== Titles listed by county ==
=== By county ===
County	Titles	Runners-up	Total	Most recent win
Kilkenny	24	9	33	2023
Offaly	13	15	28	2012
Wexford	11	10	21	2025
Dublin	4	11	15	2024
Laois	2	9	11	1996
Carlow	1	1	2	2013

=== Clubs per county ===
County	Winners	Winning Clubs	Runners-Up	Runner-Up Clubs
Kilkenny	24	Ballyhale Shamrocks (12), James Stephens (4), O'Loughlin Gaels (3), Glenmore (2), The Fenians, St. Martin's, Graigue-Ballycallan	9	Ballyhale Shamrocks (3), James Stephens (1), O'Loughlin Gaels, The Fenians, Young Irelands, Dicksboro, Bennettsbridge
Offaly	13	Birr (7), St. Rynagh's (4), Kilcormac/Killoughey, Coolderry	15	St. Rynagh's (4), Birr (3), Kinnitty (3), Kilcormac/Killoughey (3), Coolderry, Tullamore
Wexford	11	Rathnure (6), Buffer's Alley (3), Oulart-the Ballagh, St Martin's	10	Oulart-the Ballagh (6), Rathnure (2), Buffer's Alley, Faythe Harriers
Dublin	4	Cuala (2), Crumlin, Na Fianna	11	University College Dublin (3), Ballyboden St. Enda's (2), Cuala (2), Crumlin (1), O'Toole's (1), Kilmacud Crokes (1), Na Fianna (1)
Laois	2	Camross (2)	9	Castletown (3), Camross (3), Portlaoise (2), Clough/Ballacolla (1),
Carlow	1	Mount Leinster Rangers	1	St. Mullin's

== List of finals ==
=== List of Leinster finals ===
Year	Winners			Runners-up			Referee
Year	County	Club	Score	County	Club	Score	Referee
2025	WEX	St Martin's	0-24	KIL	Ballyhale Shamrocks	2-17	Chris Mooney (Dublin)
2024	DUB	Na Fianna	2-22	OFF	Kilcormac–Killoughey	2-16	Padraig Dunne (Laois)
2023	KIL	O'Loughlin Gaels	0-22	DUB	Na Fianna	1-18	Caymon Flynn (Westmeath)
2022–23	KIL	Ballyhale Shamrocks	2-22	DUB	Kilmacud Crokes	2-19	Paud O'Dwyer (Carlow)
2021–22	KIL	Ballyhale Shamrocks	6-23	LAO	Clough–Ballacolla	0-14	Richie Fitzsimons (Offaly)
2020-21	Cancelled due to the impact of the COVID-19 pandemic on Gaelic games						
2019-20	KIL	Ballyhale Shamrocks	1-21	CAR	St. Mullin's	0-15	Sean Stack (Dublin)
2018–19	KIL	Ballyhale Shamrocks	2-21	DUB	Ballyboden St Endas	0-11	Patrick Murphy (Carlow)
2017–18	DUB	Cuala	1-23	OFF	Kilcormac/Killoughey	1-09	Sean Cleere (Kilkenny)
2016–17	DUB	Cuala	3-19	KIL	O'Loughlin Gaels	1-16	Mick Murtagh (Westmeath)
2015–16	WEX	Oulart–The Ballagh	2-13	DUB	Cuala	0-13	David Hughes (Carlow)
2014–15	KIL	Ballyhale Shamrocks	0-21	OFF	Kilcormac/Killoughey	1-14	Paud O’Dwyer (Carlow)
2013–14	CAR	Mount Leinster Rangers	0-11	WEX	Oulart–The Ballagh	0-08	John Keenan (Wicklow)
2012–13	OFF	Kilcormac–Killoughey	1-12	WEX	Oulart–The Ballagh	0-11	Sean Cleere (Kilkenny)
2011-12	OFF	Coolderry	1-15	WEX	Oulart–The Ballagh	1-11	James McGrath (Westmeath)
2010-11	KIL	O'Loughlin Gaels	0-14	WEX	Oulart–The Ballagh	1-08	Tony Carroll (Offaly)
2009-10	KIL	Ballyhale Shamrocks	1-16	OFF	Tullamore	1-08	James Owens (Wexford)
2008-09	KIL	Ballyhale Shamrocks	2-13	OFF	Birr	1-11	Fergus Smith (Meath)
2007-08	OFF	Birr	1-11	DUB	Ballyboden St Endas	0-13	Anthony Stapleton (Laois)
2006-07	KIL	Ballyhale Shamrocks	1-20	OFF	Birr	1-08	James McGrath (Westmeath)
2005-06	KIL	James Stephens	2-13	DUB	UCD	1-12	James Owens (Wexford)
2004-05	KIL	James Stephens	1-13	DUB	UCD	1-12	
2003-04	KIL	O'Loughlin Gaels	0-15	OFF	Birr	0-09	
2002-03	OFF	Birr	2-05	KIL	Young Irelands	1-02	
2001-02	OFF	Birr	0–10; 2-10 (R)	LAO	Castletown	1-07; 0-05 (R)	
2000-01	KIL	Graigue-Ballycallan	0-14	DUB	UCD	1-08	
1999-00	OFF	Birr	1-16	LAO	Castletown	0-11	
1998–99	Wexford	Rathnure	1-13	Laois	Portlaoise	1-06	
1997–98	Offaly	Birr	0-11	Laois	Castletown	0-05	
1996–97	Laois	Camross	1-12	Dublin	O'Toole's	2-05	
1995–96	Kilkenny	Glenmore	2-13	Wexford	Oulart–The Ballagh	2-10	
1994–95	Offaly	Birr	3-07	Wexford	Oulart–The Ballagh	2-05	
1993–94	Offaly	St. Rynagh's	1-14	Kilkenny	Dicksboro	2-10	
1992–93	Wexford	Buffer's Alley	2-13	Offaly	St. Rynagh's	0-13	
1991–92	Offaly	Birr	2-14	Kilkenny	Ballyhale Shamrocks	0-03	
1990–91	Kilkenny	Glenmore	0-15	Laois	Camross	1-09	
1989–90	Kilkenny	Ballyhale Shamrocks	2-11	Dublin	Cuala CLG	0-07	
1988–89	Wexford	Buffer's Alley	1-12	Kilkenny	Ballyhale Shamrocks	1-09	
1987–88	Wexford	Rathnure	3-08	Laois	Portlaoise	1-13	
1986–87	Wexford	Rathnure	2-16	Laois	Camross	3-09	
1985–86	Wexford	Buffer's Alley	3-09	Offaly	Kinnitty	0-07	
1984–85	Kilkenny	St. Martin's	2-11	Offaly	Kinnitty	0-12	
1983–84	Kilkenny	Ballyhale Shamrocks	3-06	Offaly	Kinnitty	0-09	
1982–83	Offaly	St. Rynagh's	1-16	Wexford	Buffer's Alley	2-10	
1981–82	Kilkenny	James Stephens	0-13	Wexford	Faythe Harriers	1-09	
1980–81	Kilkenny	Ballyhale Shamrocks	3-10	Offaly	Coolderry	1-08	
1979–80	Dublin	Crumlin	3-05	Laois	Camross	0-11	
1978–79	Kilkenny	Ballyhale Shamrocks	1-13	Dublin	Crumlin	1-06	
1977–78	Wexford	Rathnure	0-16	Kilkenny	The Fenians	1-10	
1976–77	Laois	Camross	3-09	Kilkenny	James Stephens	1-14	
1975–76	Kilkenny	James Stephens	1-14	Offaly	St. Rynagh's	2-04	
1974–75	Kilkenny	The Fenians	2-06	Offaly	St. Rynagh's	1-06	
1973–74	Wexford	Rathnure	1-18	Offaly	St. Rynagh's	2-09	
1972–73	Offaly	St. Rynagh's	5-05	Wexford	Rathnure	2-13	
1971–72	Wexford	Rathnure	2-12	Kilkenny	Bennettsbridge	1-08	
1970–71	Offaly	St. Rynagh's	4-10	Wexford	Rathnure	2-09	

== Records and statistics ==
=== Team ===
- Most wins: 12:
  - Ballyhale Shamrocks (1978, 1980, 1983, 1989, 2006, 2008, 2009, 2014, 2018, 2019, 2021, 2022)
- Most consecutive wins: 4:
  - Ballyhale Shamrocks (2018, 2019, 2021, 2022)
- Most appearances in a final: 15:
  - Ballyhale Shamrocks (1978, 1980, 1983, 1988, 1989, 1991, 2006, 2008, 2009, 2014, 2018, 2019, 2021, 2022, 2025)
- Most appearances in a final without ever winning: 3
  - Kinnitty (1983, 1984, 1985)
  - Castletown (1997, 1999, 2001)
  - University College Dublin (2000, 2004, 2005)
- Most appearances in a final without losing (streak): 8
  - Ballyhale Shamrocks (2006, 2008, 2009, 2014, 2018, 2019, 2021, 2022)
- Most defeats: 6
  - Oulart–The Ballagh (1994, 1995, 2010, 2011, 2012, 2013)

==== Most consecutive appearances ====
Pos.	No.	Club	Years in sequence
1st	4	Ballyhale Shamrocks	2018, 2019, 2021, 2022
1st	4	St. Rynagh's	1972, 1973, 1974, 1975
1st	4	Rathnure	1970, 1971, 1972, 1973
1st	4	Oulart–The Ballagh	2010, 2011, 2012, 2013
2nd	3	Kinnitty	1983, 1984, 1985
2nd	3	Birr	2001, 2002, 2003
2nd	3	Birr	2006, 2007, 2008
2nd	3	Cuala	2015, 2016, 2017

=== Teams ===
==== County representatives ====
Year	Carlow	Dublin	Kilkenny	Laois	Offaly	Westmeath	Wexford
2006	Mount Leinster Rangers	Craobh Chiaráin	Ballyhale Shamrocks	Rathdowney-Errill	Birr		Rathnure
2007	Mount Leinster Rangers	Ballyboden St. Enda's	Ballyhale Shamrocks	Camross	Birr		Oulart–The Ballagh
2008		Ballyboden St. Enda's	Ballyhale Shamrocks	Rathdowney-Errill	Birr	Raharney	St. Martin's
2009		Ballyboden St. Enda's	Ballyhale Shamrocks	Clough/Ballacolla	Tullamore	Clonkill	Oulart–The Ballagh
2010		Ballyboden St. Enda's	O'Loughlin Gaels	Rathdowney-Errill	Coolderry	Raharney	Oulart–The Ballagh
2011		Ballyboden St. Enda's	James Stephens	Cough/Ballacolla	Coolderry	Clonkill	Oulart–The Ballagh
2012	Mount Leinster Rangers	Kilmacud Crokes	Ballyhale Shamrocks	Rathdowney-Errill	Kilcormac/Killoughey	Clonkill	Oulart–The Ballagh
2013	Mount Leinster Rangers	Ballyboden St. Enda's	Clara	Camross	Kilcormac/Killoughey	Castletown-Geoghegan	Oulart–The Ballagh
2014	St. Mullin's	Kilmacud Crokes	Ballyhale Shamrocks	Rathdowney-Errill	Kilcormac/Killoughey	Raharney	Shelmaliers
2015	St. Mullin's	Cuala	Clara	Clough/Ballacolla	Coolderry	Clonkill	Oulart–The Ballagh
2016	St. Mullin's	Cuala	O'Loughlin Gaels	Borris-in-Ossory/Kilcotton	St. Rynagh's	Raharney	Oulart–The Ballagh
2017	Mount Leinster Rangers	Cuala	Dicksboro	Camross	Kilcormac/Killoughey	Castletown-Geoghegan	St. Martin's
2018	Mount Leinster Rangers	Ballyboden St. Enda's	Ballyhale Shamrocks	Camross	Coolderry	Clonkill	Naomh Éanna
2019	St. Mullin's	Cuala	Ballyhale Shamrocks	Rathdowney-Errill	St. Rynagh's	Clonkill	St. Martin's
2020	No championship						
2021	Mount Leinster Rangers	Kilmacud Crokes	Ballyhale Shamrocks	Clough/Ballacolla	St. Rynagh's	Raharney	Rapparees

==== By decade ====
The most successful team of each decade, judged by number of Leinster Championship titles, is as follows:

- 1970s: 3 for Rathnure (1971-73-77)
- 1980s: 3 for Ballyhale Shamrocks (1980-3-89)
- 1990s: 4 for Birr (1991-94-97-99)
- 2000s: 3 each for Birr (2001-02-07) and Ballyhale Shamrocks (2006-08-09)
- 2010s: 3 for Ballyhale Shamrocks (2014-18-19)
- 2020s: 2 for Ballyhale Shamrocks (2020-22)

==== Successful defending ====
Only 5 teams of the 14 who have won the championship have ever successfully defended the title. These are:

- Ballyhale Shamrocks on 4 attempts out of 10 (2009, 2019, 2021, 2022)
- Birr in 1 attempts out of 7 (2002)
- Rathnure in 1 attempt out of 6 (1987)
- James Stephens in 1 attempt out of 4 (2005)
- Cuala on 1 attempt out of 1 (2017)

==== Gaps ====
Top five longest gaps between successive championship titles:

- 23 years: James Stephens (1981–2004)
- 20 years: Camross (1976–1996)
- 17 years: Ballyhale Shamrocks (1989–2006)
- 13 years: O'Loughlin Gaels (2010–2023)
- 11 years: Rathnure (1987–1998)
- 11 years: St. Rynagh's (1982–1993)

=== Top scorer ===
==== Overall ====
Year	Top scorer	Team	Score	Total
1976	Frank Keenan	Camross	3-15	24
1977				
1978	John Leonard	Brownstown	4-10	22
1979	Frank Keenan	Camross	4-17	29
1980	John Quigley	Rathnure	0-19	19
1981				
1982	Pádraig Horan	St. Rynagh's	2-20	26
1983	Billy Bohane	Portlaoise	2-22	28
1984	Tom Moran	St. Martin's	4-08	20
1985	Paddy Corrigan	Kinnitty	3-21	30
1986	Eamon Quirke	Naomh Eoin	5-10	25
1986	Jimmy Houlihan	Rathnure	0-25	25
1987	Billy Bohane	Portlaoise	1-22	25
1988	Seán McDermott	St. Vincent's	3-14	23
1989	Martin Wallace	Cuala	6-02	20
1990	Ray Heffernan	Glenmore	0-21	21
1991	Declan Pilkington	Birr	0-17	17
1992	Tom Dempsey	Buffer's Alley	0-24	24
1993	Michael Conneely	St. Rynagh's	1-23	26
1994	Mick Slye	Naomh Eoin	0-13	13
1994	John Keogh	Kiltegan	1-10	13
1995	Seán Dunne	Oulart–The Ballagh	3-14	23
1996	Jamesie Brennan	O'Toole's	0-28	28
1997	Jamesie Brennan	O'Toole's	1-15	18
1998	Paul Codd	Rathnure	1-14	17
1999	John O'Connor	St. Martin's	3-05	14
2000	Joey O'Toole	Trim	3-09	18
2001	Simon Whelehan	Birr	2-14	20
2002	D. J. Carey	Young Irelands	4-10	22
2003	Nigel Skehan	O'Loughlin Gaels	0-21	21
2004	Eoin Larkin	James Stephens	3-18	27
2005	Eoin Larkin	James Stephens	2-23	29
2006	Henry Shefflin	Ballyhale Shamrocks	2-08	14
2007	David Curtin	Ballyboden St. Enda's	0-13	13
2008	Henry Shefflin	Ballyhale Shamrocks	0-25	25
2009	Henry Shefflin	Ballyhale Shamrocks	1-23	26
2010	Mark Bergin	O'Loughlin Gaels	1-23	26
2011	Eoin Moore	Oulart–The Ballagh	2-12	18
2012	Ciarán Slevin	Kilcormac/Killoughey	1-20	23
2013	Denis Murphy	Mount Leinster Rangers	0-26	26
2014	T. J. Reid	Ballyhale Shamrocks	1-18	21
2014	Ciarán Slevin	Kilcormac/Killoughey	0-21	21
2015	David Treacy	Cuala	0-28	28
2016	Con O'Callaghan	Cuala	6-10	28
2017	David Treacy	Cuala	0-25	25
2018	Paul Ryan	Ballyboden St. Enda's	0-34	34
2019	T. J. Reid	Ballyhale Shamrocks	2-34	40
2020	No championship			
2021	Eoin Cody	Ballyhale Shamrocks	3-12	21
2022	Oisín O'Rorke	Kilmacud Crokes	1-30	33

==== Single game ====
Year	Top scorer	Team	Opposition	Score	Total
1979	Frank Keenan	Camross	Castletown Geoghegan	3-08	17
1980	Johnny Walsh	Ardclough	Camross	2-07	13
1981					
1982	Noel Geraghty	Castletown Geoghegan	Slasher Gaels	4-02	14
1983	Seán Grace	Ballyhale Shamrocks	Kiltale	3-02	11
1984	John Kennedy	Naomh Moninne	Slasher Gaels	2-06	12
1985	Paddy Corrigan	Kinnitty	Ardclough	2-09	15
1986	Eamon Quirke	Naomh Eoin	Naomh Moninne	4-09	21
1987	Declan Murray	Trim	Slasher Gaels	2-05	11
1988	Tim Massey	Trim	Wolfe Tones	4-02	14
1989	Pat Murphy	St. Mullin's	Naomh Moninne	0-11	11
1990	Michael Conneely	St. Rynagh's	Castletown Geoghegan	1-09	12
1991	Mick Deeley	Moorefield	Slasher Gaels	0-10	10
1992	Mick Slye	Naomh Eoin	Wolfe Tones	2-03	9
1992	Tom Dempsey	Buffer's Alley	Trim	2-03	9
1993	Seán McDermott	St. Vincent's	Wolfe Tones	3-04	13
1994	John Keogh	Kiltegan	Naas	0-08	8
1995	Martin Massey	Killyon	Naomh Moninne	0-11	11
1996	Jamesie Brennan	O'Toole's	Naomh Bríd	0-11	11
1997	Jamesie Brennan	O'Toole's	St. Mullin's	1-09	12
1998	Damien Cleere	Graigue-Ballycallan	Coill Dubh	2-07	13
1999	Michael Moran	Kiltegan	Erin's Own	3-02	12
2000	Joey O'Toole	Trim	Carnew Emmets	3-03	12
2001	Simon Whelehan	Birr	Castletown	1-08	11
2001	Connie Ring	Craobh Chiaráin	Longford Slashers	0-11	11
2002	D. J. Carey	Young Irelands	Kilmessan	2-05	13
2003	Adrian McAndrew	Coill Dubh	Clonguish	3-04	13
2004	Eoin Larkin	James Stephens	University College Dublin	1-07	10
2005	Des Mythen	Oulart–The Ballagh	Knockbridge	3-03	12
2005	Eoin Larkin	James Stephens	Castletown	1-09	12
2006	Alan McCrabbe	Craobh Chiaráin	Birr	1-05	8
2006	Henry Shefflin	Ballyhale Shamrocks	Birr	1-05	8
2006	Seán Michael Murphy	Mount Leinster Rangers	Craobh Chiaráin	0-08	8
2007	Paul O'Meara	Birr	Ballyboden St. Enda's	1-04	7
2007	Zane Keenan	Camross	Ballyboden St. Enda's	0-07	7
2007	T. J. Reid	Ballyhale Shamrocks	Mount Leinster Rangers	0-07	7
2008	Henry Shefflin	Ballyhale Shamrocks	Raharney	0-10	10
2009	Brendan Murtagh	Clonkill	Clough-Ballacolla	1-09	12
2010	Paul Ryan	Ballyboden St. Enda's	O'Loughlin Gaels	2-05	11
2010	Mark Bergin	O'Loughlin Gaels	Ballyboden St. Enda's	0-11	11
2011	Eoin Larkin	James Stephens	Oulart-the Ballagh	0-11	11
2012	Ciarán Slevin	Kilcormac/Killoughey	Mount Leinster Rangers	1-10	13
2013	Ciarán Slevin	Kilcormac/Killoughey	Oulart-the Ballagh	1-07	10
2013	Niall O'Brien	Castletown Geoghegan	Mount Leinster Rangers	0-10	10
2014	Seán McGrath	Kilmacud Crokes	Rathdowney-Errill	0-15	15
2015	David Treacy	Cuala	Coolderry	0-12	12
2015	Keith Hogan	Clara	Cuala	0-12	12
2016	Con O'Callaghan	Cuala	Borris-in-Ossory/Kilcotton	4-03	15
2017	Niall O'Brien	Castletown Geoghegan	Kilcormac/Killoughey	1-08	11
2017	Joe Coleman	St. Martin's	Cuala	0-11	11
2018	Brian Carroll	Coolderry	Ballyboden St. Enda's	2-16	22
2019	T. J. Reid	Ballyhale Shamrocks	St. Martin's	2-16	22
2020	No championship				
2021	Ronan Hayes	Kilmacud Crokes	Raharney	2-06	12
2021	Stephen Maher	Clough/Ballacolla	Rapparees Starlights	1-09	12
2021	Denis Murphy	Mount Leinster Rangers	Ballyhale Shamrocks	0-12	12
2022	Eoin Cody	Ballyhale Shamrocks	Castletown Geoghegan	2-09	15

==== Finals ====
Final	Top scorer	Team	Score	Total
1970	Gerry Burke	St. Rynagh's	1-04	7
1971	Watty Kennedy	Bennettsbridge	1-04	7
1972	Dan Quigley	Rathnure	2-03	9
1973	Dan Quigley	Rathnure	1-15	18
1974	Mick Garrett	Fenians	1-01	4
1974	Billy Fitzpatrick	Fenians	0-04	4
1974	Barney Moylan	St. Rynagh's	0-04	4
1975	Liam O'Brien	James Stephens	0-08	8
1976	Frank Keenan	Camross	1-04	7
1977	Billy Fitzpatrick	Fenians	0-07	7
1978	Brendan Fennelly	Ballyhale Shamrocks	1-05	8
1979	Bernard Donovan	Crumlin	2-01	7
1980	Patrick Holden	Ballyhale Shamrocks	2-01	7
1981	Brendan Murphy	Faythe Harriers	1-02	5
1982	Pádraig Horan	St. Rynagh's	1-08	11
1983	Liam Fennelly	Ballyhale Shamrocks	2-01	7
1984	Tom Moran	St. Moran's	2-04	10
1985	Colm Doran	Buffers Alley	2-01	7
1986	Jimmy Houlihan	Rathnure	0-12	12
1987	Jimmy Houlihan	Rathnure	0-05	5
1988	Ger Fennelly	Ballyhale Shamrocks	1-07	10
1988	Mick Butler	Buffers Alley	1-07	10
1989	Ger Fennelly	Ballyhale Shamrocks	1-02	5
1990	Ray Heffernan	Glenmore	0-09	9
1991	Declan Pilkington	Birr	0-09	9
1992	Tom Dempsey	Buffers Alley	0-08	8
1993	Michael Conneely	St. Rynagh's	0-07	7
1994	Paul Murphy	Birr	2-00	6
1995	Seán Dunne	Oulart–The Ballagh	2-01	7
1996	Joe Dollard	Camross	0-07	7
1997	Gary Cahill	Birr	0-04	4
1998	Brian Bohan	Portlaoise	1-03	6
1999	Paul Cuddy	Castletown	0-05	5
1999	Simon Whelehan	Birr	0-05	5
2000	Adrian Ronan	Graigue-Ballycallan	0-05	5
2000	Jim Byrne	University College Dublin	0-05	5
2001	Simon Whelehan	Birr	1-08	11
2002	Rory Hanniffy	Birr	1-02	5
2002	Simon Whelehan	Birr	1-02	5
2003	Nigel Skehan	O'Loughlin Gaels	0-08	8
2004	Eoin Larkin	James Stephens	1-07	10
2005	Eoin Larkin	James Stephens	0-08	8
2006	Henry Shefflin	Ballyhale Shamrocks	1-05	8
2007	Paul O'Meara	Birr	1-04	7
2008	Henry Shefflin	Ballyhale Shamrocks	0-07	7
2008	Simon Whelehan	Birr	0-07	7
2009	Shane Dooley	Tullamore	1-04	7
2010	Mark Bergin	O'Loughlin Gaels	0-06	6
2011	Cathal Parlon	Coolderry	1-03	6
2012	Nicky Kirwan	Oulart–The Ballagh	0-06	6
2013	Denis Murphy	Mount Leinster Rangers	0-08	8
2014	T. J. Reid	Ballyhale Shamrocks	0-10	10
2015	David Treacy	Cuala	0-10	10
2016	David Treacy	Cuala	0-11	11
2016	Mark Bergin	O'Loughlin Gaels	0-11	11
2017	David Treacy	Cuala	0-10	10
2018	T. J. Reid	Ballyhale Shamrocks	0-09	9
2019	Marty Kavanagh	St. Mullin's	0-12	12
2020	No final			
2021	Eoin Cody	Ballyhale Shamrocks	1-06	9
2022	T. J. Reid	Ballyhale Shamrocks	0-08	8
2022	Oisín O'Rorke	Kilmacud Crokes	0-08	8

== See also ==
- South Leinster Senior Club Championship
- List of Leinster Senior Club Hurling Championship winners
- Leinster Intermediate Club Hurling Championship (Tier 2)
- Leinster Junior Club Hurling Championship (Tier 3)
- Leinster Junior B Club Hurling Championship (Tier 4)

== Sources ==
- Roll of Honour on Leinster GAA website
