= Pauric Mahony =

Irish hurler (born 1992)

Personal information
- Native name: Pádraic Ó Mathúna (Irish)
- Nickname: Paudie
- Born: 11 May 1992 (age 34) Waterford, Ireland
- Occupation: Sales manager
- Height: 1.85 m (6 ft 1 in)

Sport
- Sport: Hurling
- Position: Centre-forward
Club*
Years	Club	Apps (scores)
2009-present	Ballygunner	123 (18-935)
Club titles
- Waterford titles: 13
- Munster titles: 4
- All-Ireland Titles: 1
College
- Years: College
- 2011-2016: Waterford Institute of Technology
College titles
- Fitzgibbon titles: 1
Inter-county**
Years	County	Apps (scores)
2011-2023	Waterford	33 (1-205)
Inter-county titles
- Munster titles: 0
- All-Irelands: 0
- NHL: 1
- All Stars: 0
- * club appearances and scores correct as of 20:17, 1 December 2024. **Inter County team apps and scores correct as of 18:03, 31 January 2023.

Pauric Mahony (born 11 May 1992) is an Irish hurler who plays for Waterford Senior Championship club Ballygunner and was previously the captain of the Waterford senior hurling team before announcing his retirement from inter-county hurling in 2023.

== Playing career ==
=== De La Salle College ===
Mahony first came to prominence as a hurler with De La Salle College in Waterford. He played in every grade before eventually joining the college's senior team. On 8 March 2008, he was just 15-years-old when he won a Harty Cup medal after lining out at left corner-forward in a 1–11 to 0–07 defeat of Thurles CBS in the final. On 19 April 2008, Mahony again lined out at left corner-forward when De La Salle College again faced Thurles CBS in the All-Ireland final. He top-scored with 1-03 from play and claimed a winners' medal following the 2–09 to 2-08 replay victory.

=== Waterford Institute of Technology ===
Mahony studied at the Waterford Institute of Technology and joined the senior hurling team in his second year at the institute. On 1 March 2014, he scored 0-04 from frees when he lined out at centre forward when Waterford IT defeated the Cork Institute of Technology by 0–17 to 0–12 to win the Fitzgibbon Cup.

On 1 March 2015, Mahony was selected at centre-forward when Waterford IT faced the University of Limerick in the Fitzgibbon Cup final. He top scored with 0–08 in a 0–21 to 3–12 draw. Mahony was again at centre-forward for the replay on 11 March 2015 but ended the game on the losing side after a 2–18 to 1–14 defeat.

=== Ballygunner ===
==== Minor and under-21 ====
Mahony joined the Ballygunner club at a young age and played in all grades at juvenile and underage levels. On 30 September 2007, he was at left wing-back when Ballygunner faced Dungarvan in the Waterford Minor A Championship final. Mahony was substituted before the end of the game but collected a winners' medal after the 3–24 to 2–09 victory.

On 8 November 2009, Mahony lined out in a second Minor A Championship final when he was selected at centre-forward against a Dunhill-Fenor amalgamation. He top scored with 0–10, including seven points from placed balls, and claimed a second winners' medal after the 2–17 to 0–10 victory.

Mahony played in a third Minor A Championship final in four years on 3 October 2010. Lining out at left corner-forward against De La Salle, he scored 0–09 overall and won a third championship medal after the 2–12 to 2–09 victory. It was his last game in the minor grade.

Mahony was still eligible for the minor grade when he was selected for the Ballygunner under-21 team. On 6 December 2009, he lined out at right wing-forward in the Under-21 A Championship final against Dungarvan. Mahony scored two points from play and claimed his first winners' medal in the grade after a 1–07 to 1–06 victory.

On 29 August 2010, Mahony lined out at centre-forward in a second successive Under-21 A Championship final. He scored two points from play and claimed a second successive winners' medal after a second successive 2–18 to 1–11 defeat of Dungarvan.

Mahony was appointed captain of the Ballygunner under-21 team for the 2011 season and lined out in a third successive Under-21 A Championship final on 20 November 2011. He scored 0-08, including five frees, from centre-forward and collected a third successive under-21 championship medal after the 4–23 to 0–10 defeat of Cappoquin.

On 17 November 2012, Mahony lined out in a fourth successive Under-21 A Championship final. He top scored with 1–11, including 0-10 from frees, and collected a fourth and final winners' medal after the 1–13 to 0–15 defeat of St. Carthage's.

==== Senior ====
After several impressive displays for the Ballygunner intermediate team, Mahony was drafted onto the club's senior team and immediately broke onto the starting fifteen during the 2009 Waterford Championship. On 11 October 2009, he was just 17-years-old when he lined out in his first senior final. Lismore were the opponents, however, the game ended in a 4–12 to 2–18 draw. The replay a week later saw Mahony claim his first winners' medal following a 1–17 to 0–19 victory. On 29 November 2009, he lined out at left wing-forward when Ballygunner suffered a 2–11 to 0–09 defeat by Newtownshandrum in the Munster final.

Mahony lined out in his second final on 24 October 2010, with Ballygunner hoping to retain the title for the first time in 12 years. He ended on the losing side following a 3–13 to 1–11 defeat by De La Salle.

Ballygunner qualified for a third successive final on 16 October 2011, with Mahony lining out at full-forward. He top-scored with 0-11 and collected a second winners' medal following a 1–19 to 0–06 defeat of Tallow.

Four final appearances in succession proved beyond Ballygunner, however, the club reached a fourth final in five seasons on 13 October 2013. Mahony scored 1-07 but ended on the losing side for the second time in his career following a 3–16 to 3–13 defeat by first-time champions Passage.

Mahony made his fifth final appearance with Ballygunner on 5 October 2014. Ballygunner defeated Mount Sion by 2–16 to 0-09, with Mahony collecting a third winners' medal after top-scoring with 0–10.

On 18 October 2015, Mahony won a fourth Waterford Senior Championship medal following a 0–16 to 0–12 defeat of Tallow in the final. He later lined out in a second Munster final on 19 November 2015. Mahony scored two points but ended the game on the losing following a 2–18 to 2–11 defeat by Na Piarsaigh.

On 23 October 2016, Mahony lined out in a fourth successive final and his seventh overall. He collected a fifth winners' medal at the end of the game after scoring 1-11 during the 4–20 to 1–12 defeat of Passage.

On 22 October 2017, Mahony won a sixth Waterford Senior Championship medal as joint-captain when Ballygunner defeated De La Salle by 2–18 to 0–16 in the final. On 19 November 2017, he lined out in a third Munster final, however, he ended on the losing side once again following a 3–15 to 2–10 defeat by Na Piarsaigh.

Mahony won a seventh Waterford Senior Championship title on 7 October 2018 when Ballygunner defeated Abbeyside by 2–19 to 0–13 to secure a fifth successive title. He was again at left wing-forward on 18 November 2018 when Ballygunner defeated Na Piarsaigh by 2–14 to 2–08 to win the Munster Championship.

On 13 October 2019, Mahony lined out at centre-forward when Ballygunner faced De La Salle in the final. He top-scored with 0–122, including six frees, and collected an eighth winners' medal overall following the 1–24 to 1–15 victory.

=== Waterford ===
==== Minor and under-21 ====
Mahony first played for Waterford as a member of the minor team during the 2009 Munster Championship. He made his first appearance for the team on 29 April 2009 when he scored three points from left wing-forward in a 1–12 to 0–14 defeat by Clare. On 12 July 2009, Mahony was switched to right wing-forward for the Munster final against Tipperary. He scored two points from play and claimed a winners' medal after the 0–18 to 1–13 victory.

Mahony was once again eligible for the minor grade the following year and lined out in a second successive Munster final on 11 July 2010. He scored four points from frees but ended the game on the losing side after a 1–16 to 1–11 defeat by Clare.

Mahony progressed onto the Waterford under-21 team in advance of the 2011 Munster Championship. He made his debut in that grade on 1 June 2011 when he lined out at centre-forward and scored six points from frees in a 4–12 to 1–16 defeat by Tipperary. His three-year tenure with the under-21 team ended without a single victory.

==== Senior ====
Mahony was added to the Waterford senior panel prior to the start of the 2011 National League. He made his first appearance for the team on 13 February 2011 when he scored two points in a 3–16 to 2–19 defeat by Dublin. On 12 June 2011, Mahony made his Munster Championship debut when he scored 0–07 in a 3–15 to 3–14 defeat of Limerick. He was again at left wing-forward when Waterford lost the Munster final to Tipperary by 7–19 to 0–19 on 10 July 2011. Mahony ended his debut season by being nominated for a GAA/GPA All-Star.

On 15 July 2012, Mahony lined out in a second successive Munster final when Waterford faced Tipperary for the second year in-a-row. He scored two points from play but ended the game on the losing side after the 2–17 to 0–16 defeat.

On 3 May 2015, Mahony won a National League medal after top-scoring with 0-11 from centre-forward in Waterford's 1–24 to 0–17 defeat of Cork in the final. Six days later, Mahony broke his leg in a club match and was ruled out for the rest of the season.

On 1 May 2016, Mahony was introduced as an 88th-minute substitute for Michael Walsh when Waterford drew 0-22 apiece with Clare in the National League final. He was an unused substitute for the replay, which Waterford lost by 1–23 to 2–19. On 10 July 2016, Mahony lost the third Munster final of his career after top-scoring with 0-07 when Waterford suffered a 5–19 to 0–13 defeat by Tipperary. He ended the season by receiving his second GAA/GPA All-Star nomination.

On 3 September 2017, Mahony lined out at centre-forward when Waterford faced Galway in the All-Ireland final. He top scored with 0–11, including seven points from frees, but ended the game on the losing side following a 0–26 to 2–17 defeat. Mahony ended the championship as top scorer with 0-50, while he was later nominated for a third GAA/GPA All-Star.

On 15 December 2019, it was announced that Mahony would captain the Waterford senior team for the 2020 season. He was later ruled out of the 2020 Championship after picking up a knee injury.

In January 2023, Mahony announced his retirement from inter-county hurling.

=== Munster ===
On 19 February 2012, Mahony was selected for the Munster inter-provincial team for the first time. He scored two points after coming on as a 58th-minute substitute for John Gardiner in the 3–14 to 1–16 defeat by Leinster in the semi-final of the Interprovincial Championship.

== Personal life ==
Mahony is nephew to former inter county hurler Billy O'Sullivan and current Waterford hurler Shane O'Sullivan. His brother Philip Mahony is currently also a panel member on the Waterford senior hurling team.

== Career statistics ==
=== Club ===
As of 1 December 2024.

Team	Year	Waterford		Munster		All-Ireland		Total	
Team	Year	Apps	Score	Apps	Score	Apps	Score	Apps	Score
Ballygunner	2009-10	7	1-02	2	0-01	—		9	1-03
Ballygunner	2010-11	7	3-13	—		—		7	3-13
Ballygunner	2011-12	7	0-58	1	0-07	—		8	0-65
Ballygunner	2012-13	2	0-19	—		—		2	0-19
Ballygunner	2013-14	8	1-74	—		—		8	1-74
Ballygunner	2014-15	8	0-70	1	0-05	—		9	0-75
Ballygunner	2015-16	1	0-09	0	0-00	—		1	0-09
Ballygunner	2016-17	8	2-47	1	0-08	—		9	2-55
Ballygunner	2017-18	8	1-72	3	1-24	—		11	2-96
Ballygunner	2018-19	6	2-66	3	1-32	1	0-10	10	3-108
Ballygunner	2019-20	6	0-69	3	0-20	—		9	0-89
Ballygunner	2020-21	5	1-48	—		—		5	1-48
Ballygunner	2021-22	4	0-29	3	0-17	2	0-09	9	0-55
Ballygunner	2022-23	5	2-40	3	0-29	1	0-06	9	2-75
Ballygunner	2023-24	5	1-40	3	0-28	1	0-07	9	1-75
Ballygunner	2024-25	5	1-48	3	1-28	—		8	2-76
Total		92	15-704	26	3-199	5	0-32	123	18-935

=== Inter-county ===
Team	Year	National League			Munster		All-Ireland		Total	
Team	Year	Division	Apps	Score	Apps	Score	Apps	Score	Apps	Score
Waterford Minor	2009	—			4	0-11	1	1-02	5	1-13
Waterford Minor	2010	—			4	1-30	1	0-03	5	1-33
Waterford Minor	Total	—			8	1-41	2	1-05	10	2-46
Waterford U21	2011	—			1	0-06	—		1	0-06
Waterford U21	2012	—			1	0-01	—		1	0-01
Waterford U21	2013	—			1	0-01	—		1	0-01
Waterford U21	Total	—			3	0-08	—		3	0-08
Waterford	2011	Division 1	5	0-13	2	0-20	2	0-09	9	0-42
Waterford	2012	Division 1A	4	0-17	2	0-02	1	0-03	7	0-22
Waterford	2013	Division 1A	5	0-19	1	0-01	2	0-00	8	0-20
Waterford	2014	Division 1A	6	1-53	2	0-16	2	0-18	10	1-87
Waterford	2015	Division 1B	8	1-90	0	0-00	0	0-00	8	1-90
Waterford	2016	Division 1A	3	0-00	2	0-12	3	0-31	8	0-43
Waterford	2017	Division 1A	6	0-48	1	0-05	5	0-45	12	0-98
Waterford	2018	Division 1A	4	0-29	3	1-26	—		7	1-55
Waterford	2019	Division 1B	5	0-14	3	0-16	—		8	0-30
Waterford	2020	Division 1A	4	0-23	0	0-00	0	0-00	4	0-23
Waterford	2021	Division 1A	0	0-00	0	0-00	0	0-00	0	0-00
Waterford	2022	Division 1B	4	0-05	2	0-01	—		6	0-06
Waterford	Total		54	2-311	18	1-99	15	0-106	87	3-516
Career total			54	2-311	29	2-148	17	1-111	100	5-570

== Honours ==
=== Team ===
De La Salle College

- All-Ireland Senior Colleges' Hurling Championship (1): 2008
- Munster Senior Colleges' Hurling Championship (1): 2008

Waterford Institute of Technology

- Fitzgibbon Cup (1): 2014

Ballygunner

- All-Ireland Senior Club Hurling Championship (1): 2022
- Munster Senior Club Hurling Championship (4): 2018, 2021, 2022, 2023
- Waterford Senior Hurling Championship (13): 2009, 2011, 2014, 2015, 2016, 2017, 2018, 2019, 2020, 2021, 2022, 2023, 2024
- Waterford Under-21 Hurling Championship (4): 2009, 2010, 2011 (c), 2012
- Waterford Minor Hurling Championship (3): 2007, 2009, 2010

Waterford

- National Hurling League (2): 2015, 2022
- Munster Minor Hurling Championship (1): 2009

=== Individual ===
- Waterford Young Hurler of The Year (1): 2010

Sporting positions
Preceded by Noel Connors	Waterford Senior Hurling Captain; 2020	Succeeded by Stephen Bennett
