= Philip Mahony (hurler) =

Irish hurler (born 1991)

Personal information
- Nickname: Phil
- Born: 9 January 1991 (age 35) Waterford, Ireland
- Height: 1.83 m (6 ft 0 in)

Sport
- Sport: Hurling
- Position: Left wing-back
Club
- Years: Club
- 2008–present: Ballygunner
Club titles
- Waterford titles: 8
- Munster titles: 1
College
- Years: College
- University College Cork
College titles
- Fitzgibbon titles: 1
Inter-county*
Years	County	Apps (scores)
2010–2020	Waterford	24 (0-04)
Inter-county titles
- Munster titles: 1
- All-Irelands: 0
- NHL: 1
- All Stars: 0
- *Inter County team apps and scores correct as of 15:36, 5 January 2019.

Philip Mahony (born 9 January 1991) is an Irish hurler who plays for Waterford Senior Championship club Ballygunner. He played for the Waterford senior hurling team for 10 years, during which time he usually lined out as a left wing-back.

Mahony began his hurling career at club level with Ballygunner. After enjoying a hugely successful underage career, which saw him claim a collective total of seven championship medals at minor and under-21 levels, he joined the club's senior team while still a minor. The highlight of Mahony's senior career has been the winning of the Munster Club Championship in 2018, while he has also collected eight Waterford Club Championship medals. Mahony's early prowess also saw him claim back-to-back All-Ireland Colleges Championship medals with De La Salle College and a Fitzgibbon Cup medal with University College Cork.

At inter-county level, Mahony was part of the successful Waterford minor team that won the Munster Championship in 2009 before playing for four consecutive seasons with the under-21 team. He joined the Waterford senior team in 2010. Mahony's career as a half-back and midfielder was blighted by injuries, however, he made a combined total of 64 National League and Championship appearances in a career that ended with his last game in 2019. During that time he won Munster Championship and National Hurling League medals as well as being an All-Ireland Championship runner-up in 2017.

A three-time nominee for a GAA-GPA All-Star Award, Mahony announced his retirement from inter-county hurling on 3 January 2020.

== Playing career ==
=== De La Salle College ===
Mahony first came to prominence as a hurler with De La Salle College in Waterford. He played in every grade before eventually joining the college's senior team. On 11 March 2007, he won a Harty Cup medal after lining out at right wing-back for De La Salle's 2–07 to 0–11 defeat of St. Flannan's College in the final. Mahony retained his position at right wing-back when De La Salle faced Kilkenny CBS in the All-Ireland final on 22 April 2007. He ended the game with a winners' medal following the 0–13 to 1–09 victory.

On 8 March 2008, Mahony won a second successive Harty Cup medal following a 1–11 to 0–07 defeat of Thurles CBS in the final. On 19 April 2008, he won a second successive All-Ireland medal as joint-captain of the team with Noel Connors following De La Salle's 2–09 to 2–08 defeat of Thurles CBS in a final replay.

=== University College Cork ===
On 3 March 2012, Mahony was selected at midfield when UCC qualified to play the Cork Institute of Technology in the Fitzgibbon Cup final. He ended the game with a winners' medal after the 2–15 to 2–14 victory.

=== Ballygunner ===
==== Minor and under-21 ====
Mahony joined the Ballygunner club at a young age and came to prominence during the club's underage boom. On 12 November 2006, he was just 15-years-old when he lined out at right wing-back when Ballygunner faced Cappoquin in the Minor A Championship final. Mahony ended the game with his first winners' medal in that grade following the 2–12 to 2–05 victory.

On 30 September 2007, Mahony was selected at centre-back when Ballygunner qualified for a second successive Minor A Championship final. He claimed a second winners' medal after the 3–24 to 2–09 defeat of Dungarvan.

Mahony was in his fourth and final year with the Ballygunner minor team when he was appointed captain of the team. On 8 November 2009, he lined out in a third Minor A Championship final in four seasons when he was selected at right wing-back against a Dunhill-Fenor amalgamation. Mahony claimed a third winners' medal and had the honour of lifting the cup as captain after the 2–17 to 0–10 victory.

Mahony was still eligible for the minor grade when he was selected for the Ballygunner under-21 team. On 6 December 2009, he lined out at centre-back in the Under-21 A Championship final against Dungarvan. Mahony claimed his first winners' medal in the grade after a 1–07 to 1–06 victory.

On 29 August 2010, Mahony again lined out at centre-back in a second successive Under-21 A Championship final. He ended the game by collecting a second successive winners' medal after a second successive 2–18 to 1–11 defeat of Dungarvan.

Mahony lined out in a third successive Under-21 A Championship final on 20 November 2011. Playing in his customary position of centre-back, he ended the game with a third successive under-21 championship winners' medal after the 4–23 to 0–10 defeat of Cappoquin.

On 17 November 2012, Mahony lined out in a fourth successive Under-21 A Championship final. In what was his last game for the under-21 team, he collected a fourth and final winners' medal after the 1–13 to 0–15 defeat of St. Carthage's.

==== Senior ====
Mahony was still eligible for the minor grade when he was drafted onto the Ballygunner senior team. On 11 October 2009, he was just 18-years-old when he lined out in his first senior final. Lismore were the opponents, however, the game ended in a 4–12 to 2–18 draw. The replay a week later saw Mahony claim his first winners' medal following a 1–17 to 0–19 victory. On 29 November 2009, he lined out at right wing-back when Ballygunner suffered a 2–11 to 0–09 defeat by Newtownshandrum in the Munster final.

Mahony lined out in his second final on 24 October 2010, with Ballygunner hoping to retain the title for the first time in 12 years. He scored a point from right wing-back but ended on the losing side following a 3–13 to 1–11 defeat by De La Salle.

Ballygunner qualified for a third successive final on 16 October 2011, with Mahony once again lining out at right wing-back. He collected a second winners' medal following the 1–19 to 0–06 defeat of Tallow.

Four final appearances in succession proved beyond Ballygunner, however, the club reached a fourth final in five seasons on 13 October 2013. Mahony was deployed at midfield but ended on the losing side for the second time in his career following a 3–16 to 3–13 defeat by first-time champions Passage.

Mahony was back at right wing-back when he made his fifth final appearance on 5 October 2014. Ballygunner defeated Mount Sion by 2–16 to 0–09, with Mahony collecting a third championship winners' medal.

On 18 October 2015, Mahony won a fourth Waterford Senior Championship medal following a 0–16 to 0–12 defeat of Tallow in the final. He later lined out in a second Munster final on 19 November 2015, however, he ended the game on the losing side following a 2–18 to 2–11 defeat by Na Piarsaigh.

On 23 October 2016, Mahony lined out in a fourth successive final and made his seventh final appearance overall. He collected a fifth winners' medal from centre-back at the end of the game after the 4–20 to 1–12 defeat of Passage.

On 22 October 2017, Mahony won a sixth Waterford Senior Championship medal when Ballygunner defeated De La Salle by 2–18 to 0–16 in the final. On 19 November 2017, he lined out in a third Munster final, however, in spite of being one of the stand-out defenders he ended on the losing side once again following a 3–15 to 2–10 defeat by Na Piarsaigh.

Mahony won a seventh Waterford Senior Championship title on 7 October 2018 when Ballygunner defeated Abbeyside by 2–19 to 0–13 to secure a fifth successive title. He was again at centre-back on 18 November 2018 when Ballygunner defeated Na Piarsaigh by 2–14 to 2–08 to win the Munster Club Championship. Mahony ended the season by being chosen on the Club Team of the Year.

On 13 October 2019, Mahony lined out at centre-back when Ballygunner faced De La Salle in the final. He collected an eighth winners' medal overall following the 1–24 to 1–15 victory.

=== Waterford ===
==== Minor and under-21 ====
Mahony first played for Waterford as a member of the minor team during the 2008 Munster Championship. He made his first appearance for the team on 25 June 2008 when he lined out at centre-back in a 4–13 to 1–06 defeat by Cork.

Eligible for the minor grade once again the following year, Mahony once again lined out at centre-back when Waterford faced Tipperary in the Munster final on 12 July 2009. He ended the game with a winners' medal after the 0–18 to 1–13 victory.

Mahony was still a member of the Waterford minor team when he was drafted onto the under-21 team in advance of the 2009 Munster Championship. He made his first appearance for the team on 15 July 2009 when he lined out at right wing-back in a 3–21 to 2–14 defeat of Tipperary. Mahony was again at right wing-back on 29 July 2009 when Waterford suffered a 2–17 to 2–12 defeat by Clare in the Munster final. He spent a further three seasons with the Waterford under-21 team but ended his underage career without any further success.

==== Senior ====
Mahony was drafted onto the Waterford senior panel during the 2010 Munster Championship. On 17 July 2010, he won a Munster Championship medal as a member of the extended panel following Waterford's 1–16 to 1–13 defeat of Cork in the final.

On 13 February 2011, Mahony made his first appearance for the Waterford senior team when he lined out at midfield in Waterford's 3–16 to 2–19 draw with Dublin in the National Hurling League. On 10 July 2011, he was an unused substitute when Waterford suffered a 7–19 to 0–19 defeat by Tipperary in the Munster final.

Mahony lined out in his first Munster final on 15 July 2012 when he was selected at midfield against Tipperary. He ended the game on the losing side following a 2–17 to 0–16 defeat. On 8 January 2013, it was confirmed that Mahony would be unavailable for the entire 2013 season as he was travelling.

Mahony returned to the Waterford panel in advance of the 2014 National League. On 6 May 2014, it was revealed that he would miss the entire Championship after suffering a double leg fracture and a dislocated ankle.

On 3 May 2015, Mahony was selected at left wing-back when Waterford faced Cork in the National League final. He ended the game with a winners' medal after the 1–24 to 0–17 victory. On 12 July 2015, Mahony was again selected at left wing-back when Waterford suffered a 0–21 to 0–16 defeat by Tipperary for the fourth time in six seasons in the Munster final.

On 1 May 2016, Mahony scored a point from left wing-back when Waterford drew 0–22 apiece with Clare in the National League final. He was retained in the same position for the replay, which Waterford lost by 1–23 to 2–19. On 10 July 2016, Mahony was switched to right wing-back when Waterford suffered a 5–19 to 0–13 defeat by Tipperary in the Munster final.

On 3 September 2017, Mahony was selected at left wing-back when Waterford faced Galway in the All-Ireland final. He ended the game on the losing side after the 0–26 to 2–17 defeat.

On 31 March 2019, Mahony was selected at right wing-back for Waterford's National League final meeting with Limerick at Croke Park. He ended the game on the losing side following the 1–24 to 0–19 defeat.

Mahony announced his retirement from inter-county hurling on 3 January 2020.

== Career statistics ==
Team	Year	National League			Munster		All-Ireland		Total	
Team	Year	Division	Apps	Score	Apps	Score	Apps	Score	Apps	Score
Waterford	2010	Division 1	—		0	0-00	0	0-00	0	0-00
Waterford	2011	Division 1	3	0-00	0	0-00	0	0-00	3	0-00
Waterford	2012	Division 1A	5	0-00	2	0-01	1	0-00	8	0-01
Waterford	2013	Division 1A	—		—		—		—	
Waterford	2014	Division 1A	5	0-02	—		—		5	0-02
Waterford	2015	Division 1B	8	0-00	2	0-00	2	0-00	12	0-00
Waterford	2016	Division 1A	9	0-02	2	0-01	3	0-00	14	0-03
Waterford	2017	Division 1A	0	0-00	1	0-00	5	0-00	6	0–00
Waterford	2018	Division 1A	5	0-00	4	0-02	—		9	0-02
Waterford	2019	Division 1B	5	0-01	2	0-00	—		7	0-01
Career total			40	0-05	13	0-04	11	0-00	64	0-09

== Honours ==
De La Salle College

- All-Ireland Senior Colleges' Hurling Championship (2): 2007, 2008 (jc)
- Munster Senior Colleges' Hurling Championship (2): 2007, 2008 (jc)

University College Cork

- Fitzgibbon Cup (1): 2012

Ballygunner

- Munster Senior Club Hurling Championship (1): 2018
- Waterford Senior Hurling Championship (8): 2009, 2011, 2014, 2015, 2016, 2017, 2018, 2019
- Waterford Under-21 Hurling Championship (4): 2009, 2010, 2011, 2012
- Waterford Minor Hurling Championship (3): 2006, 2007, 2009

Waterford

- Munster Senior Hurling Championship (1): 2010
- National Hurling League (1): 2015
- Munster Minor Hurling Championship (1): 2009
