= Stephen O'Keeffe =

Irish hurler (born 1991)

Personal information
- Native name: Stiofán Ó Cuív (Irish)
- Born: 29 April 1991 (age 35) Waterford, Ireland
- Occupation: Bank Official
- Height: 1.85 m (6 ft 1 in)

Sport
- Sport: Hurling
- Position: Goalkeeper
Club
- Years: Club
- 2009–: Ballygunner
Club titles
- Waterford titles: 15
- Munster titles: 5
- All-Ireland Titles: 2
College
- Years: College
- 2010–2014: Waterford Institute of Technology
College titles
- Fitzgibbon titles: 1
Inter-county**
| Years | County | Apps (scores) |
| 2011–2021 | Waterford | 31 (0-00) |
Inter-county titles
- Munster titles: 0
- All-Irelands: 0
- NHL: 1
- All Stars: 1
- **Inter County team apps and scores correct as of 15:07, 15 June 2019.

Stephen O'Keeffe (born 29 April 1991) is an Irish hurler who plays for Waterford Senior Championship club Ballygunner and formerly at inter-county level with the Waterford county hurling team. He usually lines out as a goalkeeper.

== Playing career ==
=== De La Salle College ===
O'Keeffe first came to prominence as a hurler with De La Salle College in Waterford. He played in every grade before eventually joining the college's senior team. On 11 March 2007, he won a Harty Cup medal after lining out in goal for De La Salle's 2–07 to 0–11 defeat of St. Flannan's College. O'Keeffe retained his position in goal when De La Salle faced Kilkenny CBS in the All-Ireland final on 22 April 2007. He ended the game with a winners' medal following the 0–13 to 1–09 victory.

On 8 March 2008, O'Keeffe won a second successive Harty Cup medal following a 1–11 to 0–07 defeat of Thurles CBS in the final. On 19 April 2008, he won a second successive All-Ireland medal following De La Salle's 2–09 to 2–08 defeat of Thurles CBS in a final replay.

=== Waterford Institute of Technology ===
O'Keeffe studied at the Waterford Institute of Technology and joined the senior hurling team in his second year at the institute. On 1 March 2014, he lined out in goal when Waterford IT defeated the Cork Institute of Technology by 0–17 to 0–12 to win the Fitzgibbon Cup.

=== Ballygunner ===
==== Minor ====
O'Keeffe joined the Ballygunner club at a young age and played in all grades at juvenile and underage levels. On 12 November 2006, he was just 15-years-old when he lined out in goal when Ballygunner defeated Cappoquin by 2–12 to 2–05 to win the Waterford Minor Championship title.

On 30 September 2007, O'Keeffe lined out in goal in a second successive Waterford Minor Championship final. A 3–24 to 2–09 defeat of Dungarvan secured a second successive winners' medal.

Three titles in-a-row proved beyond the Ballygunner minor team, however, on 8 November 2009 Ballygunner lined out in a third final in four seasons. O'Keeffe collected a third winners' medal after a 2–17 to 0–10 defeat of Dunhill-Fenor.

==== Senior ====
On 11 October 2009, O'Keeffe was just 18-years-old when he lined out in goal in his first Waterford Senior Championship final. Lismore were the opponents, however, the game ended in a 4–12 to 2–18 draw. The replay a week later saw O'Keeffe claim his first winners' medal following a 1–17 to 0–19 victory. On 29 November 2009, he was in goal when Ballygunner suffered a 2–11 to 0–09 defeat by Newtownshandrum in the Munster final.

O'Keeffe lined out in his second Waterford Senior Championship final on 24 October 2010, with Ballygunner hoping to retain the title for the first time in 12 years. He ended on the losing side following a 3–13 to 1–11 defeat by De La Salle.

Ballygunner qualified for a third successive Waterford Senior Championship final on 16 October 2011, with O'Keeffe lining out in goal once again. He collected a second winners' medal following a 1–19 to 0–06 defeat of Tallow.

Four final appearances in succession proved beyond Ballygunner, however, the club reached a fourth final in five seasons on 13 October 2013. O'Keeffe ended on the losing side for the second time in his career following a 3–16 to 3–13 defeat by first-time champions Passage.

O'Keeffe lined out in goal in a fifth Waterford Senior Championship final on 5 October 2014. Ballygunner defeated Mount Sion by 2–16 to 0-09, with O'Keeffe collecting a third winners' medal.

On 18 October 2015, O'Keeffe won a fourth Waterford Senior Championship medal following a 0–16 to 0–12 defeat of Tallow in the final. He later lined out in a second Munster final on 19 November 2015. O'Keeffe ended the game on the losing following a 2–18 to 2–11 defeat by Na Piarsaigh.

On 23 October 2016, O'Keeffe lined out in a fourth successive Waterford Championship final and his seventh overall. He collected a fifth winners' medal at the end of the game after a 4–20 to 1–12 defeat of Passage.

On 22 October 2017, O'Keeffe won a sixth Waterford Senior Championship medal in goal when Ballygunner defeated De La Salle by 2–18 to 0–16 in the final. On 19 November 2017, he lined out in a third Munster final, however, he ended on the losing side once again following a 3–15 to 2–10 defeat by Na Piarsaigh.

O'Keeffe won a seventh Waterford Senior Championship title on 7 October 2018 when Ballygunner defeated Abbeyside by 2–19 to 0–13 to secure a fifth successive title. He was again in goal on 18 November when Ballygunner defeated Na Piarsaigh by 2–14 to 2–08 to win the Munster Championship.

On 13 October 2019, O'Keeffe was again in goal when Ballygunner faced De La Salle in the Waterford Senior Championship final. He ended the game on the winning side and collected an eighth winners' medal following the 1–24 to 1–15 victory.

=== Waterford ===
==== Minor and under-21 ====
O'Keeffe first lined out for Waterford as a member of the minor team during the 2008 Munster Championship. He made his first appearance for the team on 25 June 2008 when he lined out in goal in a 4–13 to 1–06 defeat by Cork.

O'Keeffe was also eligible for the minor grade in 2009. He was in goal when Waterford qualified for a Munster final-meeting with Tipperary on 12 July 2009. He collected a Munster Championship medal following the 0–18 to 1–13 victory.

O'Keeffe joined the Waterford under-21 team in advance of the 2010 Munster Championship. He made his first appearance for the team on 3 June 2010 in a 1–16 to 1–03 defeat by Cork.

O'Keeffe retained his status as first-choice goalkeeper with the Waterford under-21 for the 2011 Munster Championship. He made his only appearance for the team on 1 June 2011 when he lined out in goal in a 4–12 to 1–16 defeat by Tipperary.

On 19 July 2012, O'Keeffe made his last appearance for the Waterford under-21 team. He once again lined out in goal in a 2–22 to 0–09 defeat by Clare in the Munster Championship.

==== Senior ====
O'Keeffe was added to the Waterford senior panel prior to the start of the 2011 National League. He made his first appearance for the team on 20 February 2011 when he lined out in goal in a 1–11 to 0–12 defeat of Wexford. O'Keeffe later served as sub-goalkeeper to Clinton Hennessy during the 2011 Munster Championship.

On 17 June 2012, O'Keeffe made his Munster Championship debut in a 2–17 to 1–18 defeat of Clare. On 15 July 2012, he was again in goal when Waterford suffered a 2–17 to 0–16 defeat by Tipperary in the Munster final.

On 3 May 2015, O'Keeffe won a National League medal following Waterford's 1–24 to 0–17 defeat of Cork in the final. On 12 July 2015, he was also in goal when Waterford were beaten for the fourth time in six seasons by Tipperary in the Munster final.

On 1 May 2016, O'Keeffe was in goal when Waterford drew 0-22 apiece with Clare in the National League final. He retained his position for the replay, which Waterford lost by 1–23 to 2–19. On 10 July 2016, O'Keeffe lost the third Munster final of his career when Waterford suffered a 5–19 to 0–13 defeat by Tipperary.

On 3 September 2017, O'Keeffe lined out in the 2017 All-Ireland final. He kept a clean sheet but ended the game on the losing side following a 0–26 to 2–17 victory for Galway. O'Keeffe ended the season by winning an GAA/GPA All-Star award.

On 31 March 2019, O'Keeffe was in goal when Waterford faced Limerick in the National League final. He ended the game on the losing side following a 1–24 to 0–19 defeat.

== Career statistics ==
As of match played 8 June 2019.

| Team | Year | National League | | | Munster | | All-Ireland | | Total | |
| Team | Year | Division | Apps | Score | Apps | Score | Apps | Score | Apps | Score |
|---|---|---|---|---|---|---|---|---|---|---|
| Waterford | 2011 | Division 1 | 2 | 0-00 | 0 | 0-00 | 0 | 0-00 | 2 | 0-00 |
| Waterford | 2012 | Division 1A | 2 | 0-00 | 2 | 0-00 | 1 | 0-00 | 5 | 0-00 |
| Waterford | 2013 | Division 1A | 3 | 0-01 | 0 | 0-00 | 3 | 0-00 | 6 | 0-01 |
| Waterford | 2014 | Division 1A | 4 | 0-00 | 2 | 0-00 | 2 | 0-00 | 8 | 0-00 |
| Waterford | 2015 | Division 1B | 6 | 0-00 | 2 | 0-00 | 2 | 0-00 | 10 | 0-00 |
| Waterford | 2016 | Division 1A | 8 | 0-00 | 2 | 0-00 | 3 | 0-00 | 13 | 0-00 |
| Waterford | 2017 | Division 1A | 2 | 0-00 | 1 | 0-00 | 5 | 0-00 | 8 | 0-00 |
| Waterford | 2018 | Division 1A | 3 | 0-00 | 3 | 0-00 | — | | 6 | 0-00 |
| Waterford | 2019 | Division 1B | 4 | 0-00 | 3 | 0-00 | — | | 7 | 0-00 |
| Total | | | 34 | 0-01 | 15 | 0-00 | 16 | 0-00 | 65 | 0-01 |

== Honours ==
De La Salle College

- Dr. Croke Cup (2): 2007, 2008
- Harty Cup (2): 2007, 2008

Waterford Institute of Technology

- Fitzgibbon Cup (1): 2014

Ballygunner

- All-Ireland Senior Club Hurling Championship (2): 2022, 2026
- Munster Senior Club Hurling Championship (5): 2018, 2021, 2022, 2023, 2025
- Waterford Senior Hurling Championship (15): 2009, 2011, 2014, 2015, 2016, 2017, 2018, 2019, 2020, 2021, 2022, 2023, 2024, 2025, 2026

Waterford

- National Hurling League (1): 2015
- Munster Minor Hurling Championship (1): 2009

Awards

- All-Stars (1): 2017
