= 2018 Waterford Senior Hurling Championship =

Annual hurling competition season

- Dates: 31 March 2018 – 7 October 2018
- Teams: 12
- Sponsor: J. J. Kavanagh & Sons
- Champions: Ballygunner (17th title); Stephen O'Keeffe (captain); Shane O'Sullivan (captain); Fergal Hartley (manager)
- Runners-up: Abbeyside; Peter Queally (manager)
- Relegated: An Rinn

Tournament statistics
- Matches played: 32
- Top scorer(s): Pauric Mahony (2–66)

The 2018 Waterford Senior Hurling Championship was the 118th staging of the Waterford Senior Hurling Championship since its establishment by the Waterford County Board.

Ballygunner were the defending champions.

On 7 October 2018, Ballygunner won the championship after a 2–19 t 0–13 defeat of Abbeyside in the final. It was their 17th championship title overall and their fifth title in succession.

Ballygunner's Pauric Mahony was the championship's top scorer with 2–66.

== Results ==
=== Group A ===
==== Table ====
Team	Matches				Score			Pts
Team	Pld	W	D	L	For	Against	Diff	Pts
Ballygunner	3	3	0	0	93	28	65	6
Abbeyside	3	2	0	1	54	37	17	4
Ballyduff Upper	3	1	0	2	42	84	−42	2
An Rinn	3	0	0	3	41	81	−40	0

==== Group A results ====
31 March 2018 Round 1	Ballyduff Upper	2–16 – 0–18	An Rinn	Fraher Field, Dungarvan
	E Murray 0–8, S Kearney 1–2, A Casey 0–4, M Kearney 1–0, S Casey 0–1, J Kearney 0–1.		D Breathnach 0–10, C Breathnach 0–3, F Ó Ceallaigh 0–2, J de Barún 0–1, S Mac Craith 0–1, P Ó Murchudah 0–1.	Referee: N O'Toole

1 April 2018 Round 1	Ballygunner	1–12 – 0–07	Abbeyside	Fraher Field, Dungarvan
	Pauric Mahony 0–9, P Hogan 1–1, M Mahony 0–1, I Kenny 0–1.		M Ferncombe 0–3, S Enright 0–2, T Looby 0–1, S Whelan-Barrett 0–1.	Referee: M O'Brien

5 April 2018 Round 2	Ballyduff Upper	0–10 – 2–09	Abbeyside	Fraher Field, Dungarvan
	E Murray 0–3, J Kearney 0–2, S Kearney 0–2, M Kearney 0–2, S Hannon 0–1.		M Ferncombe 0–5, P Hurney 1–1, S Whelan-Barrett 1–1, D McGrath 0–1, E Kiely 0–1.	Referee: N Kelly

8 April 2018 Round 2	Ballygunner	0–27 – 1–08	An Rinn	Fraher Field, Dungarvan
	Pauric Mahony 0–14, P Hogan 0–3, B O'Keeffe 0–3, C Sheehan 0–2, T O'Sullivan 0–2, S O'Sullivan 0–1, B O'Sullivan 0–1, M Mahony 0–1.		A Mac Gearailt 1–1, D Breathnach 0–4, F Ó Ceallaigh 0–1, S Ó Cuirrín 0–1.	Referee: P Casey

30 June 2018 Round 3	Ballygunner	7–30 – 0–10	Ballyduff Upper	Fraher Field, Dungarvan
	C Power 4–5, Pauric Mahony 1–10, T O'Sullivan 1–2, M Mullally 1–1, B O'Sullivan 0–3, B O'Keeffe 0–3, M Mahony 0–3, P Hogan 0–1, I Kenny 0–1, H Ruddle 0–1.		E Murray 0–4, A Casey 0–2, J Kearney 0–1, S Casey 0–1, M Kearney 0–1, P Kennedy 0–1.	Referee: T Walsh

1 July 2018 Round 3	Abbeyside	5–17 – 1–09	An Rinn	Bushy Park
	M Ferncombe 2–6, N Montgomery 1–3, E Kiely 0–4, T Murray 1–0, C Prunty 1–0, P Hurney 0–2, D McGrath 0–1, S Whelan-Barrett 0–1.		F Ó Cuirrín 1–2, D Breathnach 0–5, S Ó Cuirrín 0–1, T Ó hUallacháin 0–1.	Referee: T Mansfield

=== Group B ===
==== Table ====
Team	Matches				Score			Pts
Team	Pld	W	D	L	For	Against	Diff	Pts
De La Salle	3	3	0	0	56	42	14	6
Dungarvan	3	1	0	2	55	46	9	2
Tallow	3	1	0	2	47	49	−2	2
Fourmilewater	3	1	0	2	48	59	−11	2

==== Group B results ====
31 March 2018 Round 1	Dungarvan	3–20 – 2–13	Tallow	Cappoquin
	P Curran 1–10, C Curran 2–1, M Kiely 0–2, G Crotty 0–2, Colm Curran 0–1, Cathal Curran 0–1, G Crotty 0–1, J Allen 0–1, J Nagle 0–1.		R Grey 0–8, T Ryan 1–2, T Daly 1–0, D Mulcahy 0–1, I Beecher 0–1, J Henley 0–1.	Referee: P Casey

31 March 2018 Round 1	De La Salle	4–17 – 1–15	Fourmilewater	Fraher Field, Dungarvan
	C McCann 2–3, J Fagan 1–3, S Ryan 0–5, A Farrell 1–0, K Moran 0–2, E Madigan 0–2, D Twomey 0–1, P Nevin 0–1.		J Barron 1–7, D Guiry 0–4, T Barron 0–2, C Guiry 0–1, C Gleeson 0–1.	Referee: N Kelly

5 April 2018 Round 2	De La Salle	0–14 – 1–08	Tallow	Fraher Field, Dungarvan
	S Ryan 0–7, C McCann 0–3, A Farrell 0–1, K Moran 0–1, E Madigan 0–1.		T Ryan 0–5, T Daly 1–0, R Geary 0–1, I Beecher 0–1, R Grey 0–1.	Referee: M O'Brien

8 April 2018 Round 2	Fourmilewater	0–14 – 0–13	Dungarvan	Fraher Field, Dungarvan
	S Ryan 0–3, D Guiry 0–3, C Gleeson 0–2, J Barron 0–2, C Guiry 0–2, S Walsh 0–2, M O'Gorman 0–1.		P Curran 0–8, Cormac Curran 0–2, J Nagle 0–1, G Crotty 0–1, Colm Curran 0–1.	Referee: A Fitzgerald

29 June 2018 Round 3	De La Salle	1–10 – 0–13	Dungarvan	Walsh Park, Waterford
	E Meaney 1–2, K Moran 0–3, S Ryan 0–2, A Farrell 0–2, P Nevin 0–1.		Cormac Curran 0–7, G Crotty 0–2, K Power 0–2, Cathal Curran 0–1, J Curran 0–1.	Referee: N Kelly

30 June 2018 Round 3	Tallow	1–14 – 1–13	Fourmilewater	Fraher Field, Dungarvan
	T Ryan 1–5, E Sheehan 0–4, R Grey 0–2, J Neville 0–1, D Buckley 0–1, I Beecher 0–1.		D Guiry 0–7, T Guiry 1–1, C Gleeson 0–2, C Guiry 0–1, T O'Gorman 0–1, M O'Gorman 0–1.	Referee: D O'Leary

=== Group C ===
==== Table ====
Team	Matches				Score			Pts
Team	Pld	W	D	L	For	Against	Diff	Pts
Passage	3	2	0	1	52	50	2	4
Mount Sion	3	2	0	1	64	61	3	4
Roanmore	3	1	0	2	53	48	5	2
Lismore	3	1	0	2	57	67	−10	2

==== Group C results ====
31 March 2018 Round 1	Mount Sion	2–12 – 1–14	Roanmore	Walsh Park, Waterford
	M O'Neill 1–4, A Kirwan 1–0, S Roche 0–3, E Curran 0–1, A Gleeson 0–1, A Dempsey 0–1, L O'Brien 0–1, S Colfer 0–1.		E O'Toole 1–5, G O'Brien 0–3, B Nolan 0–2, B Cooke 0–2, E Madigan 0–1, D Murphy 0–1.	Referee: A Fitzgerald

1 April 2018 Round 1	Lismore	2–14 – 1–12	Passage	Fraher Field, Dungarvan
	J Shanahan 1–3, M Shanahan 0–5, R Barry 1–1, J Prendergast 0–3, P O'Keeffe 0–2.		O Connors 0–7, J Burke 1–0, K Fitzgerald 0–2, L Flynn 0–1, A Roche 0–1, G Cullinane 0–1.	Referee: T Walsh

7 April 2018 Round 2	Mount Sion	1–14 – 1–20	Passage	Walsh Park, Waterford
	MF O'Neill 0–8, A Gleeson 1–0, S Roche 0–3, D Power 0–1, A Kirwan 0–1, A Dempsey 0–1.		O Connors 0–12, T Connors 1–0, R Hurley 0–3, K Fitzgerald 0–2, S Lynch 0–2, P Walsh 0–1.	Referee: N Kelly

8 April 2018 Round 2	Lismore	0–16 – 3–14	Roanmore	Fraher Field, Dungarvan
	M Shanahan 0–11, R Barry 0–4, J Shanahan 0–1.		E O'Toole 2–3, P O'Sullivan 0–4, D Murphy 1–0, G O'Brien 0–3, C Chester 0–2, E Madigan 0–1, C Dempsey 0–1.	Referee: A Kissane

29 June 2018 Round 3	Mount Sion	4–17 – 2–15	Lismore	Fraher Field, Dungarvan
	MF O'Neill 1–4, S Roche 1–2, A Gleeson 0–5, J Meaney 1–1, E McGrath 1–0, D Power 0–3, J Kennedy 0–1, O Whelan 0–1.		M Shanahan 0–10, J Shanahan 1–1, R Barry 1–0, F Reaney 0–2, P Coleman 0–1, J Prendergast 0–1.	Referee: P Casey

1 July 2018 Round 3	Passage	1–11 – 0–13	Roanmore	Walsh Park, Waterford
	O Connors 0–6, S Treacy 1–0, K Fitzgerald 0–3, S Lynch 0–1, L Flynn 0–1.		E O'Toole 0–8, D Barrett 0–2, D Hayes 0–1.	Referee: A Kissane

=== Knock-out stage ===
==== Quarter-final play-offs ====
11 August 2018 Play-off	Roanmore	1–22 – 3–15 (aet)	Fourmilewater	Fraher Field, Dungarvan
	E O'Toole 1–7, G O'Brien 0–9, Billy Nolan 0–1, Brian Nolan 0–1, F McGrath 0–1, E Madigan 0–1, D Barrett 0–1, C Ryan 0–1.		J Barron 1–3, D Guiry 1–3, S Walsh 1–0, T Barron 0–3, C Gleeson 0–2, S Ryan 0–1, C Walsh 0–1, K Brazil 0–1.	Referee: P Casey

11 August 2018 Play-off	Tallow	3–22 – 1–27 (aet)	Ballyduff Upper	Lismore
	T Ryan 1–12, R Grey 0–6, M O'Brien 1–0, J Henley 1–0, I Beecher 0–2, D Buckley 0–1, T Daly 0–1.		E Murray 0–18, K Casey 1–2, A Casey 0–5, J Kearney 0–1, S Casey 0–1.	Referee: M Wadding

12 August 2018 Play-off	Mount Sion	0–21 – 2–13	An Rinn	Fraher Field, Dungarvan
	A Gleeson 0–13, J Meaney 0–3, O Whelan 0–1, J Kennedy 0–1, S Roche 0–1, D Power 0–1, E McGrath 0–1.		C Breathnach 1–8, C Breathnach 1–0, F Ó Ceallaigh 0–2, F Ó Cuirrín 0–2, R Ó Ceallaigh 0–1.	Referee: T Sullivan

12 August 2018 Play-off	Dungarvan	2–23 – 2–20 (aet)	Lismore	Fraher Field, Dungarvan
	A Donnelly 1–3, Cathal Curran 0–6, Colm Curran 0–5, G Power 1–0, J Allen 0–3, M Kiely 0–2, G Crotty 0–2, K Power 0–1.		M Shanahan 1–9, R Barry 1–5, I Daly 0–4, F Reaney 0–2.	Referee: M O'Brien

==== Relegation play-offs ====
24 August 2018 Semi-final	Lismore	3–21 – 1–18	An Rinn	Fraher Field, Dungarvan
	M Shanahan 1–9, D Shanahan 2–0, R Barry 0–4, J Shanahan 0–3, J Prendergast 0–2, P Prendergast 0–1, F Reaney 0–1, A Whelan 0–1.		P Ó Murchudha 1–2, D Breathnach 0–5, F Ó Ceallaigh 0–5, D Ó hArtaigh 0–2, F Ó Cuirrín 0–2, L Ó Lonáin 0–1, É Ó Crotaigh 0–1.	Referee: N O'Toole

24 August 2018 Semi-final	Fourmilewater	3–18 – 1–19	Ballyduff Upper	Fraher Field, Dungarvan
	D Guiry 2–7, J Barron 0–4, C Walsh 1–0, S Ryan 0–2, T Barron 0–1, M O'Gorman 0–1, C Gleeson 0–1, C Guiry 0–1, S Walsh 0–1.		E Murray 0–13, S Kearney 1–0, A Casey 0–2, K Casey 0–2, M Kearney 0–2.	Referee: M O'Brien

14 September 2018 Final	Ballyduff Upper	1–20 – 2–13	An Rinn	Fraher Field, Dungarvan
	E Murray 0–10, S Kearney 1–3, A Casey 0–3, M Kearney 0–2, S Casey 0–1, K Casey 0–1.		D Breathnach 1–8, F Ó Cuirrín 1–1, F Ó hAodha 0–1, T Ó hUallacháin 0–1, F Ó Ceallaigh 0–1, L Ó Lonáin 0–1.	Referee: A Fitzgerald

==== Quarter-finals ====
25 August 2018 Quarter-final	Abbeyside	2–22 – 0–10	Tallow	Fraher Field, Dungarvan
	M Ferncombe 0–15, N Montgomery 1–1, S Whelan-Barrett 1–1, T Murray 0–3, M Power 0–1.		T Ryan 0–4, D Buckley 0–2, K Geary 0–2, T Daly 0–1, R Grey 0–1.	Referee: A Fitzgerald

26 August 2018 Quarter-final	De La Salle	5–17 – 1–16	Mount Sion	Walsh Park, Waterford
	S Ryan 1–8, C McCann 1–2, E Meaney 1–1, P Nevin 1–0, T Douglas 1–0, E Barrett 0–2, S McNulty 0–1, K Moran 0–1, J Dillon 0–1, D Twomey 0–1.		A Gleeson 1–11, S Roche 0–2, O Whelan 0–1, MF O'Neill 0–1, A Kirwan 0–1.	Referee: A Kissane

26 August 2018 Quarter-final	Ballygunner	1–16 – 1–13	Roanmore	Walsh Park, Waterford
	Pauric Mahony 0–9, Brian O'Sullivan 1–2, P Hogan 0–2, M Mahony 0–1, B O'Sullivan 0–1, B O'Keeffe 0–1.		G O'Brien 0–6, E O'Toole 0–4, E Madigan 1–0, D Murphy 0–1, É Power 0–1, C Burke 0–1.	Referee: T O'Sullivan

26 August 2018 Quarter-final	Passage	5–18 – 0–15	Dungarvan	Walsh Park, Waterford
	O Connors 1–10, L Flynn 1–1, R Hurley 1–1, K Fitzgerald 0–4, S Lynch 1–0, E Kelly 1–0, T Connors 0–1, S Barlow 0–1.		C Curran 0–8, G Crotty 0–4, K Power 0–1, C Curran 0–1, M Kiely 0–1.	Referee: T Walsh

==== Semi-finals ====
22 September 2018 Semi-final	De La Salle	0–13 – 0–14	Abbeyside	Fraher Field, Dungarvan
	S Ryan 0–7, C McCann 0–2, P Nevin 0–2, A Farrell 0–1, E Meaney 0–1.		M Ferncombe 0–8, S Whelan-Barrett 0–2, P Hurney 0–1, D Collins 0–1, C Prunty 0–1, D McGrath 0–1.	Referee: T O'Sullivan

23 September 2018 Semi-final	Ballygunner	3–23 – 1–04	Passage	Walsh Park, Waterford
	Pauric Mahony 1–11, S Power 1–1, Brian O'Sullivan 0–4, JJ Hutchinson 1–0, T O'Sullivan 0–3, B O'Keeffe 0–2, Barry O'Sullivan 0–1, S O'Sullivan 0–1.		C Drohan 1–0, O Connors 0–3, R Hurley 0–1.	Referee: A Kissane

==== Final ====
7 October 2018 Final	Ballygunner	2–19 – 0–13	Abbeyside	Walsh Park, Waterford
	Pauric Mahony 0–13 (8fs), Brian O’Sullivan 1–3, C Power 1–0, B O’Keeffe, Barry O’Sullivan, M Mahony 0–1 each.	Report	M Ferncombe 0–8 (3fs, 1 65), M O’Halloran 0–2, M Power, J Hurney, P Hurney 0–1 each.	Attendance: 4,275

== Championship statistics ==
=== Top scorers ===
Top scorers overall

Rank	Player	Club	Tally	Total	Matches	Average
1	Pauric Mahony	Ballygunner	2–66	72	6	12.00
2	Eoghan Murray	Ballyduff Upper	0–56	56	6	9.33
3	Mark Ferncombe	Abbeyside	2–45	51	6	8.50
4	Maurice Shanahan	Lismore	2–44	50	5	10.00
5	Owen Connors	Passage	1–38	41	5	8.20
6	Emmett O'Toole	Roanmore	4–27	39	5	7.80
7	Thomas Ryan	Tallow	3–28	37	5	7.40
8	Austin Gleeson	Mount Sion	2–30	36	5	7.20
9	Donie Breathnach	An Rinn	1–32	35	5	7.00
10	Dylan Guiry	Fourmilewater	3–24	33	5	6.60

Top scorers in a single game

Rank	Player	Club	Tally	Total	Opposition
1	Conor Power	Ballygunner	4-05	17	Ballyduff Upper
2	Thomas Ryan	Tallow	1–12	15	Ballyduff Upper
2	Mark Ferncombe	Abbeyside	0–15	15	Tallow
3	Austin Gleeson	Mount Sion	1–11	14	De La Salle
3	Pauric Mahony	Ballygunner	1–11	14	Passage
3	Pauric Mahony	Ballygunner	0–14	14	An Rinn
4	Dylan Guiry	Fourmilewater	2-07	13	Ballyduff Upper
4	Owen Connors	Passage	1–10	13	Dungarvan
4	Pauric Mahony	Ballygunner	1–10	13	Ballyduff Upper
4	Patrick Curran	Dungarvan	1–10	13	Tallow
4	Austin Gleeson	Mount Sion	0–13	13	An Rinn
4	Eoghan Murray	Ballyduff Upper	0–13	13	Fourmilewater
4	Pauric Mahony	Ballygunner	0–13	13	Abbeyside

=== Miscellaneous ===
- Ballygunner's score of 7–30 against Ballyduff Upper is believed to be the biggest score recorded in a championship match since a Mount Sion-Erin's Own clash in 1948.
