= Thomas Ryan (Waterford hurler) =

Irish hurler (born 1989)

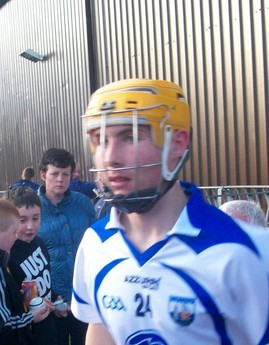

Personal information
- Native name: Tomás Ó Riain (Irish)
- Born: 19 September 1989 (age 37) Tallow, County Waterford
- Height: 5 ft 8 in (173 cm)

Sport
- Sport: Hurling
- Position: Corner Forward/Full-Forward
Club
- Years: Club
- 2006–present: Tallow
Club titles
- Waterford titles: 0
Inter-county
| Years | County | Apps (scores) |
| 2009– 2009– 2009– | Waterford (WCC); Waterford (NHL); Waterford (AI) | 5 (1–6); 11 (1–2); 1 (0–0) |
Inter-county titles
- Munster titles: 1
- All-Irelands: 0
- NHL: 0
- All Stars: 0

Thomas Ryan (born 19 September 1989 in Tallow, County Waterford) is an Irish hurler who plays for his local club Tallow and is a former Waterford senior inter-county team member.

== Playing career ==
=== Club ===
Ryan plays his club hurling with his local club Tallow in Waterford. He has played with Tallow/Cois Bride from underage upwards. Ryan has enjoyed little success with Tallow, however he was part of the 2008 under-21(B) team who won the Western hurling title. He also was part of the Minor(b) team who won the 2007 Western Hurling title.

In 2007 Cois Bhride made it to the county under 18 hurling (B) final where it ended in a draw against St Marys, Ryan was said to be one of the most skillful hurlers playing that day contributing 7points. In 2007 Thomas Ryan played corner forward for the Tallow senior team. He helped them defeat Stradbally by contributing 7 points from play. 2 weeks later Tallow played Lismore in the club championship and won by a single point. Thomas Ryan helped accomplish this by adding 1–2, getting one point from a free. Tallow eventually made it to the quarter-finals of the Top Oil County Senior Hurling Championship, where they played Abbeyside, where Ryans contribution of 3 points from play was not enough to secure a win.
In 2008 Tallow bet Ballyduff Upper very well, 3–16 to 14 points with Thomas Ryan scoring 0–1. The 5 May Tallow played Fourmilewater where it ended in a draw, with Thomas Ryan scoring the game's only goal(1–1). Thomas Ryans' Tallow had already qualified for the knockout stages of the Senior Club championship when they lost to Stradbally, Ryan being Tallow's top scorer and getting 7 points. Tallow drew Ballygunner in the quarter-finals and beat them by 2 points, this time Thomas Ryan scored 0–6 (0–5 frees and 0–1 sideline). Tallow lost the semi-final to eventual winners and All Ireland runners-up De La Salle, while Thomas Ryan contributed 0–3 of his sides 2–3.

In 2009 Tallow played Ballygunner in the round 1 stage of the Senior hurling championship. Ballygunner won 2–23 : 2:12 despite Ryan scoring 1–4 of his sides total. Thomas Ryan was unable to play his sides game against Ballyduff Lower due to injury, but nonetheless, Tallow were victorious. For the Round 3 game Tallow drew against Abbeyside with Ryan coming on late as a sub and scoring 2 points. Perhaps Thomas Ryan's' best performance with his club was when Tallow played Passage in the round 4 game. In a game of high scoring Tallow won 5–13 : 1–19 and Thomas Ryan contributed 4–1 of the total for Tallow! The point was scored for a sideline cut. In the last of the round games Tallow played Stradbally where Thomas Ryan put up another superb performance scoring 3–5, 1–0 from a penalty he earned himself and 0–3 from frees. This game allowed Tallow to progress to the quarter-finals. Tallow lost 1–14 to 0–18 to Ballyduff Upper in the quarter-final Knockout stages of the Waterford Senior Hurling Championship, Ryan scored 0–1 of his sides 1–14 compared to Ballyduff Upper's 0–19.

In 2010 Tallow played Mount Sion with Thomas Ryan scoring 1–3 (1f) Tallows next game was against Dungarvan where Tallow won by a single point. Ryan contributed 0–4(2f). Tallow then played Ballyduff Lower and won by 3 points. Thomas Ryan did not play as he was recovering from an injury sustained in the Waterford vs Cork Under 21 game. Tallows senior hurling team have already qualified for the Knockout Stages. The 22 August Tallow played Lismore in the group stages where they lost, 1–16 to 1–9. Thomas Ryan scored 0–1 from a free. The final game of the group stages was against Passage where it ended in a draw, with Ryan contributing 7 points. It all ended disappointingly for Tallow however as they drew De La Salle where they lost by 2–15 with Ryan scoring 0–2 from frees.

=== Under 21 Intercounty ===
In 2009 Ryan got to the under 21 Munster Final where they lost Clare 2–18 to 2–12, with Ryan scoring 1–1. Clare went on to win the Under 21 All Ireland. The 2010 Under 21 Championship went badly for Waterford losing to Cork 1–16 to 1–3 on the 2/6 in the under-21 Munster quarter final. Ryan badly injured his ankle on 23 June 2010 and has been unable to subsequently play.

=== Intermediate Intercounty ===
In 2010, Thomas Ryan was part of the intermediate panel that lost to Cork in the Munster final 0–15: 0–13. Thomas Ryan did not play part in the game against Clare but came on as a sub against Cork and scored the side's first point in over 15minutes. Thomas Ryan was also called on to take the sides late free which would have allowed the game go to extra time, but it trailed off wide, resulting in Waterford losing the game.

=== Senior Intercounty ===
Ryan made his Intercounty debut against Dublin in the National Hurling League 2009, when he played as a substitute. Previous to this Ryan had been starting for Waterford in the Waterford Crystal Cup competition, contributing a few points. Ryan proved good enough to earn a spot on the Senior panel for the championship.

In 2010 Ryan was part of the Waterford team who won the Waterford Crystal Cup. He also played a crucial part in the National Hurling league, scoring a goal against Cork and setting up one for teammate Dan Shanahan against Offaly. Ryan started his first National League game against Cork on 21 March. Ryan then started the following League match against Tipperary. Thomas Ryan although not listed as a sub was part of the Waterford team who bet Cork in the 2010 Munster Final Replay. On 5 August it was confirmed that Ryan was back to full training with the senior panel. Thomas Ryan made his championship debut against Tipperary in the All Ireland Semi-final where he came on as a sub in the last few minutes.

Ryan didn't play for Waterford in the Waterford Crystal Cup due to college commitments. He started his first game for Waterford in the National Hurling League against Dublin where it ended in a draw. Ryan also started the next game on the 20/2 against Wexford where he contributed 2 points from play and Waterford then went on to win.

== Personal life ==
Thomas Ryan attended St Colmans School, Fermoy and is now a student at University College Cork.

Ryan is also a painter of landscapes and has exhibited in events across the country, including the National Ploughing Championship held in Cardenton, County Kildare in 2009.

== Achievements ==
In 2003 Thomas Ryan won the All Ireland Feile Skills Competition.
In 2009 Thomas Ryan's goal against Clare in the Under 21 championship was nominated for goal of 2009.

== National Hurling League Appearances ==
| # | Date | Venue | Opponent | Score | Result | Competition |
|---|---|---|---|---|---|---|
| 1 | 22 March 2009 | Parnell Park, Dublin | Dublin | 0–0 | 0–15 : 1–11 | National Hurling League Round 3 |
| 2 | 29 March 2009 | Fraher Field, Waterford | Galway | 0–0 | 1–21 : 2–12 | National Hurling League Round 4 |
| 3 | 5 April 2009 | Gaelic Grounds, Limerick | Limerick | 0–0 | 1–14 : 1–13 | National Hurling League Round 6 |
| 4 | 21 February 2010 | Walsh Park, Waterford | Dublin | 0–0 | 4–13 : 0–12 | National Hurling League Round 1 |
| 5 | 28 February 2010 | Pearse Stadium, Salthill | Galway | 0–0 | 4–15 : 1–15 | National Hurling League Round 2 |
| 6 | 14 March 2010 | Fraher Field, Waterford | Limerick | 0–0 | 2–20 : 2–10 | National Hurling League Round 3 |
| 7 | 21 March 2010 | Walsh Park, Waterford | Cork | 1–0 | 2–20 : 3–17 | National Hurling League Round 4 |
| 8 | 28 March 2010 | Semple Stadium, Tipperary | Tipperary | 0–0 | 1–19 : 2–16 | National Hurling League Round 5 |
| 9 | 4 April 2010 | Fraher Field, Waterford | Offaly | 0–0 | 1–19 : 1–16 | National Hurling League Round 6 |

== Championship Appearances ==
| # | Date | Venue | Opponent | Score | Result | Competition | Report |
|---|---|---|---|---|---|---|---|
| 1 | 15 August 2010 | Croke Park, Dublin | Tipperary | 0–0 | 1–18 : 3–19 | All-Ireland Semi-final | RTE Sport |
