= 2011 Waterford Senior Hurling Championship =

Annual hurling competition season

- Champions: Ballygunner= (12th title); Shane O'Sullivan (captain); Niall O'Donnell (manager)
- Runners-up: Tallow

The 2011 Waterford Senior Hurling Championship was the 111th staging of the Waterford Senior Hurling Championship since its establishment by the Waterford County Board in 1897.

De La Salle were the defending champions.

On 16 October 2011, Ballygunner won the championship after a 1–19 to 0–06 defeat of Tallow in the final. This was their 12th championship title overall and their first title since 2009.

== Results ==
=== Final ===
16 October 2011 Final	Ballygunner	1–19 – 0–06	Tallow	Walsh Park, Waterford
	Pauric Mahony (0–11, eight frees), H Barnes (1–0), S OSullivan (0–2), A Moloney (0–2); Brian O'Sullivan (0–1), JJ Hutchinson (0–1), S Walsh (0–1), N Waldron (0–1).	Report	T Ryan (0–3, one free, one 65), A Pratt (0–2); P O'Brien (0–1).	Referee: M O'Brien (Portlaw)
