= 2010 Waterford Senior Hurling Championship =

Annual hurling competition season

- Champions: De La Salle (2nd title); Ian Flynn (captain); Michael Ryan (manager)
- Runners-up: Ballygunner

The 2010 Waterford Senior Hurling Championship was the 110th staging of the Waterford Senior Hurling Championship since its establishment by the Waterford County Board in 1897.

Ballygunner were the defending champions.

On 24 October 2010, De La Salle won the championship after a 3–13 to 1–11 defeat of Ballygunner in the final. This was their second championship title overall and their first title since 2008.

== Results ==
=== Final ===
24 October 2010 Final	De La Salle	3–13 – 1–11	Ballygunner	Walsh Park, Waterford
	J Mullane 0–9 (0–6f), P Nevin 2–0, D Twomey 1–0, D Greene 0–2, L Hayes 0–1, E Madigan 0–1.	Report	S Power 0–7 (0–5f, 0–1 pen, 0–1 '65'), D O'Sullivan 1–2, JJ Hutchinson 0–1, Philip Mahony 0–1.
