= 2015 National Hurling League =

84th season of the National Hurling League

National Hurling League 2015

League details
- Dates: 14 February – 3 May 2015
- Teams: 34

League champions
- Winners: Waterford (3rd win)
- Captain: Kevin Moran
- Manager: Derek McGrath

League runners-up
- Runners-up: Cork
- Captain: Anthony Nash
- Manager: Jimmy Barry Murphy

Other division winners
- Division 1B: Waterford
- Division 2A: Kerry
- Division 2B: Kildare
- Division 3A: Tyrone
- Division 3B: Warwickshire

The 2015 National Hurling League was the 84th staging of the National Hurling League. Waterford won their first title since 2007 after a 1-24 to 0-17 win against Cork in the final on 3 May.

TG4 and Setanta provided live coverage of the league with highlights shown on RTÉ2 on Sunday nights.

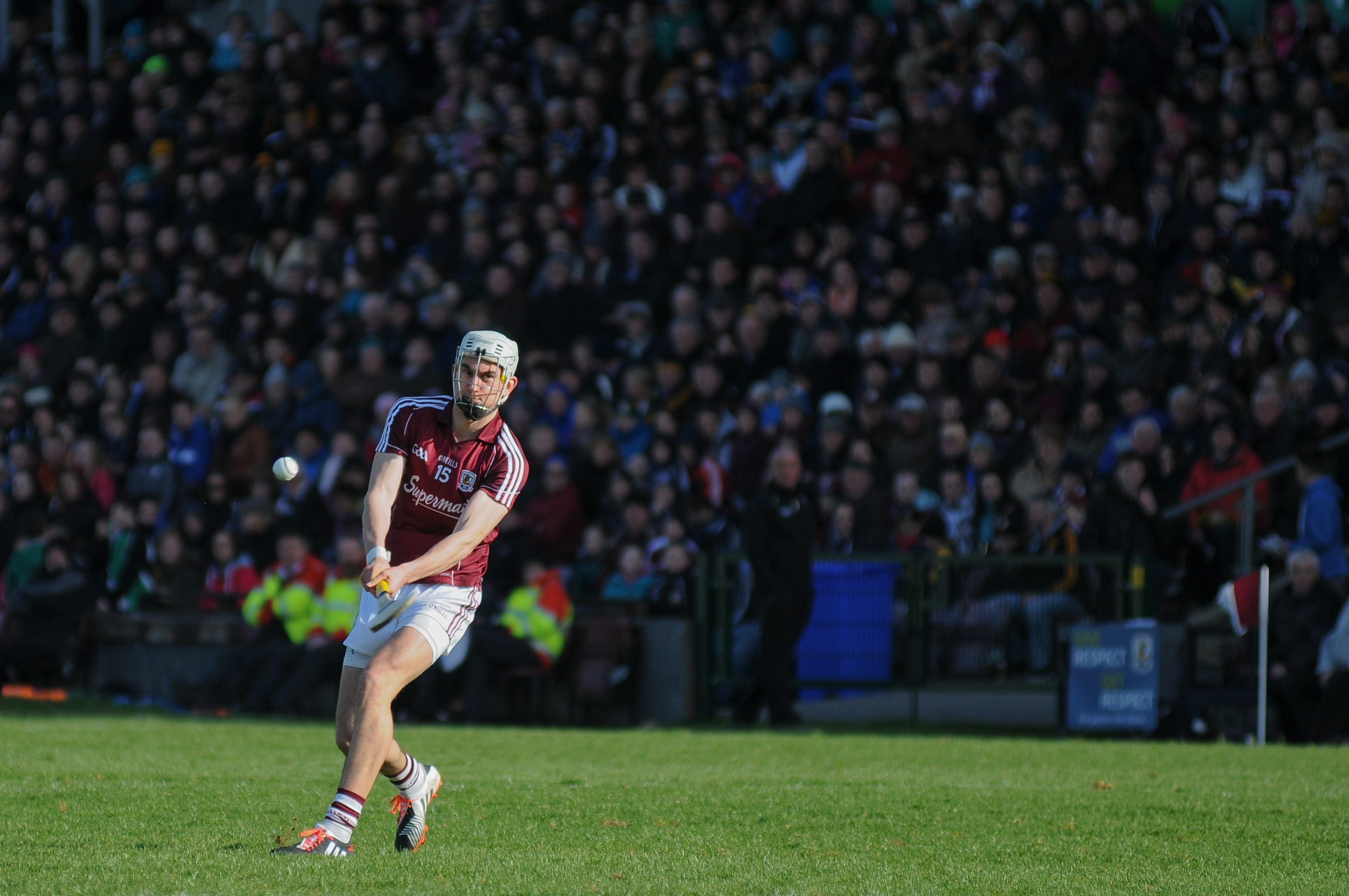
Jason Flynn in action for Galway against Kilkenny

== Format ==
34 teams play in the 2015 NHL. There are six teams in the top five divisions, and four teams in Division 3B. Each team plays each other once, either home or away. 2 points are awarded for a win, and 1 for a draw. Where two teams are level on points, the team that won the head-to-head match is ranked ahead. If this game was a draw, points difference (total scored minus total conceded in all games) is used to rank the teams. Where three or more teams are level on points, points difference is used to rank them.

- Division 1A: Top four teams qualify for NHL quarter-finals. Bottom two teams play a relegation play-off, with the losing team relegated to Division 1B.
- Division 1B: Top team promoted to 1A. Top four teams qualify for NHL quarter-finals. Bottom two teams play a relegation play-off, with the losing team playing a promotion-relegation match against the Division 2A champions.
- Division 2A: Top two teams play Division 2A final, with the winning team playing a promotion-relegation match against the loser of the Division 1B relegation play-off. Bottom team relegated to Division 2B.
- Division 2B: Top two teams play division final, with the winner being promoted. Bottom two teams play a relegation play-off, with the losing team playing a promotion-relegation match against the Division 3A champions.
- Division 3A: Top two teams play Division 3A final, with the winning team playing a promotion-relegation match against the loser of the Division 2B relegation play-off. Bottom team relegated to Division 3B.
- Division 3B: Top two teams play division final, with the winner being promoted.

== Division 1A ==
=== Division 1A ===
==== Round Robin ====
NHL quarter-finals Relegation play-off

Team	Pld	W	D	L	F	A	Diff	Pts
Tipperary	5	4	0	1	8-101	7-94	10	8
Cork	5	3	0	2	9-113	4-107	21	6
Dublin	5	3	0	2	5-111	7-95	10	6
Galway	5	2	0	3	4-89	5-96	-10	4
Kilkenny	5	2	0	3	7-84	6-103	-16	4
Clare	5	1	0	4	5-95	9-98	-15	2

- Galway are ranked ahead of Kilkenny because they won the head-to-head match between the teams (8 March at Pearse Stadium: 0-20 to 0-18).

14 February 2015; 19:00; Round 1	Kilkenny	1-22 - 2-17	Cork	Páirc Uí Rinn; Referee: James Owens
14 February 2015; 19:00; Round 1	R Hogan 0-11 (0-7f, 0-1 65), M Kelly 0-4, W Walsh 0-3, J Farrell 1-0, P Walsh 0-1, M Ruth 0-1, K Joyce 0-1, L Ryan 0-1.	Report	P Horgan 0-9 (0-8f), C Lehane 1-2, L O’Farrell 1-0, A Cadogan 0-2, S Harnedy 0-1, D Kearney 0-1, B Cooper 0-1, P O’Sullivan 0-1.	Páirc Uí Rinn; Referee: James Owens

15 February 2015; 14:00; Round 1	Dublin	2-20 - 0-14	Tipperary	Parnell Park; Attendance: 5,000; Referee: B Kelly (Westmeath)
15 February 2015; 14:00; Round 1	Paul Ryan (0-8, 0-4 frees, 0-1 '65); Eamonn Dillon (1-2); Liam Rushe (1-1); Danny Sutcliffe, Mark Schutte (0-2); Colm Cronin, Ryan O’Dwyer, Chris Crummy, Shane Durkin, Cian Boland (0-1)	Report	John O’Dwyer (0-6, 0-1 free); Seamus Callanan (0-4, 0-3 free); Shane McGrath, James Woodlock, Conor O’Brien (0-1); Jason Forde (0-1 free)	Parnell Park; Attendance: 5,000; Referee: B Kelly (Westmeath)

15 February 2015; 14:10; Round 1	Galway	2-15 - 1-17	Clare	Pearse Stadium; Referee: B Gavin (Offaly)
15 February 2015; 14:10; Round 1	Jason Flynn (0-9, 0-6 frees, 0-1 '65); Cathal Mannion (1-1); Joseph Cooney (1-0); Jonathan Glynn (0-2); Gearoid McInerney, Padraig Brehony, James Regan (0-1)	Report	Colin Ryan (0-6, 0-5 frees); John Conlon (1-2); Bobby Duggan, Conor McGrath (0-3); Colm Galvin, Brendan Bugler, Shane O’Donnell (0-1)	Pearse Stadium; Referee: B Gavin (Offaly)

21 February 2015; 19:00; Round 2	Cork	1-24 - 0-17	Clare	Páirc Uí Rinn; Referee: Johnny Ryan
21 February 2015; 19:00; Round 2	P Horgan (0-14, 0-9 frees, 0-1 '65); L O’Farrell (1-1); C Lehane (0-4); D Kearney, S Harnedy, C Murphy, A Cadogan (0-1); A Nash (0-1 free)	Report	Colin Ryan (0-8, 0-5 frees, 0-2 '65s); J Conlon (0-3); B Duggan, C Galvin (0-2); B Bugler P O’Connor (0-1)	Páirc Uí Rinn; Referee: Johnny Ryan

22 February 2015; 14:00; Round 2	Kilkenny	3-11 - 0-25	Dublin	Nowlan Park; Referee: Colm Lyons
22 February 2015; 14:00; Round 2	Richie Hogan (1-7, 1-0 penalty, 0-5 frees, 0-1 '65), Matthew Ruth (2-0); Jonjo Farrell, Padraig Walsh, Walter Walsh, Mark Kelly (0-1)	Report	David Treacy (0-11, 0-4 frees, 0-3 '65s); Danny Sutcliffe (0-4); Eamon Dillon, Mark Schutte (0-3); Peter Kelly (0-2); Simon Lambert, Shane Durkin (0-1)	Nowlan Park; Referee: Colm Lyons

22 February 2015; 14:00; Round 2	Tipperary	2-18 - 0-20	Galway	Semple Stadium; Attendance: 4,176; Referee: James McGrath
22 February 2015; 14:00; Round 2	Seamus Callanan (1-3, 0-2 frees); John O’Dwyer (1-1); Jason Forde, Kieran Bergin (0-3); John McGrath (0-2); Darren Gleeson (0-1 frees); Ronan Maher, Gearoid Ryan, Brendan Maher, Denis Maher, Conor Kenny (0-1)	Report	Jason Flynn (0-4, 0-2 frees, 0-1 sideline, 0-1 '65); Joseph Cooney, Cathal Mannion (0-3); Andrew Smith (0-2 frees), James Regan, Padraig Brehony (0-2); Iarla Tannian, Dean Higgins, Brian Molloy, Jonathan Glynn (0-1)	Semple Stadium; Attendance: 4,176; Referee: James McGrath

7 March 2015; 17:00; Round 3	Dublin	1-20 - 0-34	Cork	Croke Park; Referee: Alan Kelly
7 March 2015; 17:00; Round 3	P Ryan (0-9, 0-7 frees); D Treacy (0-3, 0-1 free), L Rushe (1-0); S Durkin, D Sutcliffe, N McMorrow (0-2); C Cronin, D O'Callaghan (0-01)	Report	P Horgan (0-14, 0-10 frees); S Harnedy (0-5), R O'Shea, L O'Farrell (0-4); L McLoughlin, M Ellis, C Murphy, D Kearney, C Lehane, A Cadogan, B Lawton (0-1)	Croke Park; Referee: Alan Kelly

8 March 2015; 14:00; Round 3	Clare	0-20 - 2-19	Tipperary	Cusack Park; Attendance: 7,363; Referee: Brian Gavin
8 March 2015; 14:00; Round 3	C Ryan (0-8 frees); C Ryan (0-5); T Kelly (0-2, 0-1 free); J Conlon (0-2); C Galvin, C McGrath, S O’Donnell (0-1)	Report	S Callanan (0-7, 0-5 frees); J McGrath (0-5); J O’Dwyer (0-4, 0-2 frees); N McGrath, J Woodlock (1-0); M Breen (0-2); J Forde (0-1)	Cusack Park; Attendance: 7,363; Referee: Brian Gavin

8 March 2015; 14:00; Round 3	Galway	0-20 - 0-18	Kilkenny	Pearse Stadium; Referee: Barry Kelly
8 March 2015; 14:00; Round 3	J Flynn (0-11, 0-7 frees, 0-1 '65); J Canning (0-4, 0-2 frees, 0-1 sideline); D Higgins (0-2); A Smith, J Regan, C Mannion (0-1)	Report	R Hogan (0-10, 0-8 frees); L Ryan, M Kelly (0-2); P Walsh, W Phelan, W Walsh, J Farrell (0-1)	Pearse Stadium; Referee: Barry Kelly

14 March 2015; 15:00; Round 4	Clare	2-22 - 2-20	Dublin	Cusack Park; Referee: Cathal McAllister
14 March 2015; 15:00; Round 4	Tony Kelly (1-9, 0-7 frees); John Conlon (1-4, 0-2 frees); Conor McGrath (0-5); Aaron Cunningham, Patrick Donnellan, David Reidy, David McInerney (0-1)	Report	Liam Rushe (1-5); David O’Callaghan (1-3); Paul Ryan (0-5 frees); Mark Schutte (0-3); Shane Barrett, Chris Crummy, Danny Sutcliffe, Ben Quinn (0-1)	Cusack Park; Referee: Cathal McAllister

15 March 2015; 14:00; Round 4	Tipperary	2-22 - 1-13	Kilkenny	Semple Stadium; Attendance: 10,421; Referee: James McGrath
15 March 2015; 14:00; Round 4	S Callanan (1-7, 0-3 frees, 0-1 '65); N O'Meara (1-2); J O'Dwyer (0-4); N McGrath (0-3); M Breen (0-2); P Maher, J Woodlock, J Forde, S Bourke (0-1);	Report	R Hogan (0-10, 0-6 frees); J Farrell (1-1); M Kelly (0-1); J Power (0-1, '65)	Semple Stadium; Attendance: 10,421; Referee: James McGrath

15 March 2015; 14:30; Round 4	Galway	0-20 - 2-17	Cork	Pearse Stadium; Referee: Fergal Horgan
15 March 2015; 14:30; Round 4	Jason Flynn (0-5, 0-4 frees); Cathal Mannion, Joe Canning (0-4); Joseph Cooney, Aidan Harte (0-3); Dean Higgins (0-1)	Report	Patrick Horgan (0-8, 0-2 '65, 0-3 frees); Paudie O'Sullivan (2-1); Conor Lehane (0-3); Seamus Harnedy, Brian Lawton, Rob O'Shea, Daniel Kearney, Aidan Walsh (0-1)	Pearse Stadium; Referee: Fergal Horgan

22 March 2015; 14:00; Round 5	Cork	4-21 - 2-28	Tipperary	Páirc Uí Rinn; Attendance: 7,895; Referee: Barry Kelly
22 March 2015; 14:00; Round 5	A Nash; S O’Neill, D Cahalane, S McDonnell; L McLoughlin, M Ellis, C Murphy (0-2); D Kearney (0-2), Aidan Walsh (0-1); R O’Shea (0-1), S Harnedy (0-5), C Lehane (1-1); A Cadogan (0-1), L O’Farrell, P Horgan (2-8).	Report	D Egan; P Stapleton, C O’Mahony, C O’Brien; R Maher (0-1), Padraic Maher, K Bergin (1-0); S McGrath, T Stapleton (0-1); N McGrath (0-7), B Maher, J Forde (1-3); J O’Dwyer (0-1), S Callanan (0-10), N O’Meara (0-3).	Páirc Uí Rinn; Attendance: 7,895; Referee: Barry Kelly

22 March 2015; 14:00; Round 5	Dublin	0-26 - 2-14	Galway	Parnell Park; Referee: J. Ryan
22 March 2015; 14:00; Round 5	A Nolan; C O'Callaghan, P Kelly, P Schutte (0-1); C Keaney, C Crummey, S Durkin; S Lambert, R O'Carroll; D Sutcliffe (0-4), E Dillon, M Schutte (0-5); D O'Callaghan (0-2), L Rushe (0-1), D Treacy (0-10)	Report	A Ryan; J Coen, P Killeen, F Moore; D Collins, G Lally, G McInerney; A Smith (0-2), A Harte (0-1); J Cooney, J Canning (1-7), J Glynn; B Molloy (0-1), N Burke (0-1), C Mannion (1-2).	Parnell Park; Referee: J. Ryan

22 March 2015; 14:00; Round 5	Kilkenny	2-20 - 2-19	Clare	Nowlan Park; Referee: J. Owens
22 March 2015; 14:00; Round 5	E Murphy; S Prendergast, P Murphy, J Tyrrell; T Keogh, K Joyce, W Phelan; J Lyng (0-1), B Kennedy; W Walsh (0-2), J Power, M Ruth (0-2); JJ Farrell (1-2), K Kelly (1-9), M Kelly (0-3).	Report	P Kelly; P Flanagan, D McInerney, J Browne; C Dillon, Conor Ryan, P Donnellan; S Morey (0-2), C Galvin (0-2); J Conlon (0-1), T Kelly (0-4), C McGrath (0-2); A Cunningham, S O'Donnell (2-0), Colin Ryan (0-7).	Nowlan Park; Referee: J. Owens

==== Division 1A relegation play-off ====
29 March 2015; Relegation play-off	Kilkenny	1-18 - 1-17	Clare	Nowlan Park, Kilkenny
29 March 2015; Relegation play-off	TJ Reid (1-3); Richie Hogan (0-5, 0-2 frees); Colin Fennelly, Walter Walsh (0-3); Cillian Buckley (0-2); Michael Fennelly, Joey Holden (0-1)	Report	Tony Kelly (0-9, 0-1 free, 0-1 '65); Shane O'Donnell (1-3); David Reidy (0-3); John Conlon, Seadna Morey (0-1)	Nowlan Park, Kilkenny

== Division 1B ==
=== Division 1B ===
==== Round Robin ====
Promotion & NHL quarter-finals NHL quarter-finals Relegation play-off

Team	Pld	W	D	L	F	A	Diff	Pts
Waterford	5	4	1	0	9-113	3-68	63	9
Limerick	5	3	1	1	7-101	6-92	12	7
Wexford	5	3	0	2	11-95	6-95	15	6
Offaly	5	3	0	2	5-88	4-96	-5	6
Laois	5	1	0	4	2-87	11-106	-46	2
Antrim	5	0	0	5	4-75	8-112	-49	0

14 February 2015; 19:00; Round 1	Offaly	1-24 - 0-23	Laois	O'Moore Park; Referee: A Kelly (Galway)
14 February 2015; 19:00; Round 1	S Dooley (1-14, 1-10f), S Kinsella (0-03), P Murphy (0-02); J Bergin (0-02), S Ryan (0-02), C Kiely (0-01).	Report	Z Keenan (0-10, 0-07f, 0-01 ‘65); C Dwyer (0-06), W Hyland (0-03), N Foyle (0-02), P Purcell (0-01), J Campion (0-01).	O'Moore Park; Referee: A Kelly (Galway)

14 February 2015; 19:00; Round 1	Limerick	2-16 - 0-22	Waterford	Gaelic Grounds; Referee: C Lyons (Cork)
14 February 2015; 19:00; Round 1	D Reidy 2-3 (2-0 pen, 3f), G O’Mahony 0-5, P Browne 0-4, R McCarthy 0-1, T Condon 0-1, C Lynch 0-1, A Breen 0-1.	Report	Pauric Mahony 0-11 (9f), J Barron 0-2, A Gleeson 0-2, B O’Halloran 0-2, P Prendergast 0-2, K Moran 0-1, M Walsh 0-1, Shane Bennett 0-1.	Gaelic Grounds; Referee: C Lyons (Cork)

15 February 2015; 14:00; Round 1	Wexford	1-24 - 2-20	Antrim	Wexford Park; Referee: C McAllister (Cork)
15 February 2015; 14:00; Round 1	J Guiney (0-9, 0-5 frees); L Óg McGovern (1-3); D Waters (0-3); L Chin, I Byrne, D O'Keeffe (0-2); D Redmond, H Kehoe, P Morris (0-1)	Report	P Shiels (1-6, 0-6 frees); C Clarke (1-4); N McManus (0-3); D McKernan (0-2); A Graffan, M Bradley, C Carson, C McCann, PJ O'Connell (0-1)	Wexford Park; Referee: C McAllister (Cork)

21 February 2015; 19:00; Round 2	Waterford	3-21 - 0-12	Laois	Fraher Field, Dungarvan; Referee: Diarmuid Kirwan
21 February 2015; 19:00; Round 2	Pauric Mahony (1-14, 0-9 frees); S Bennett (1-1); T Connors (1-0); A Gleeson (0-2); B O'Halloran, M Walsh, S O'Sullivan, D Breathnach (0-1)	Report	Z Keenan (0-9 frees); P Purcell, W Hyland, R King (0-1)	Fraher Field, Dungarvan; Referee: Diarmuid Kirwan

22 February 2015; 14:00; Round 2	Limerick	0-23 - 1-12	Antrim	Páirc Mac Uílín, Ballycastle; Referee: John Keenan
22 February 2015; 14:00; Round 2	Shane Dowling (0-6 frees); David Reidy, Paul Browne, Cian Lynch, Tom Condon (0-3); Donal O’Grady (0-2); James Ryan, Seamus Hickey, Wayne McNamara (0-1)	Report	Paul Shiels (0-7, 0-5 frees); Eoghan Campbell (1-1); Matthew Donnelly, Simon McCrory, Conor Johnston, Conor Clarke (0-1)	Páirc Mac Uílín, Ballycastle; Referee: John Keenan

22 February 2015; 14:00; Round 2	Wexford	2-15 - 0-12	Offaly	O'Connor Park, Tullamore; Referee: Fergal Horgan
22 February 2015; 14:00; Round 2	J Guiney (1-3, 0-3 frees); D Remond, L Og McGovern (0-4); P Doran (1-0); K Foley (0-2); I Byrne, D Waters (0-1)	Report	S Dooley (0-8, 0-7 frees); J Bergin (0-3); S Kinsella (0-1)	O'Connor Park, Tullamore; Referee: Fergal Horgan

7 March 2015; 15:00; Round 3	Waterford	2-18 - 1-14	Offaly	O'Connor Park, Tullamore; Referee: James Owens
7 March 2015; 15:00; Round 3	P Mahony (0-7, 0-6 frees); M Walsh, Shane Bennett (1-1); J Dillon (0-3); C Dunford (0-2); A Gleeson, B O'Halloran, M O'Neill, S Fives (0-1)	Report	S Dooley (1-10, 0-8 frees); B Carroll (0-2); J Mulrooney, C Parlon (0-1)	O'Connor Park, Tullamore; Referee: James Owens

8 March 2015; 12:45; Round 3	Limerick	4-16 - 3-18	Wexford	Wexford Park; Referee: Johnny Ryan
8 March 2015; 12:45; Round 3	S Dowling (1-6, 1-5 frees); D Hannon (1-3); J Fitzgibbon (1-2); D Breen (1-1); W McNamara, D Reidy, S Tobin, S O'Brien (0-1)	Report	L Og McGovern (2-1), J Guiney (1-6, 0-6 frees); P Morris (0-3); D Redmond, I Byrne, P Doran (0-2); D O'Keeffe, H Kehoe (0-1)	Wexford Park; Referee: Johnny Ryan

8 March 2015; 14:00; Round 3	Laois	1-18 - 1-14	Antrim	Páirc Mac Uílín, Ballycastle; Referee: Tony Carroll
8 March 2015; 14:00; Round 3	Z Keenan (0-9, 0-7 frees, 1 '65); P Purcell (1-0); C Dwyer (0-3); W Hyland (0-2); R King, B Conroy, PJ Scully (0-1)	Report	P Shiels (1-7, 0-7 frees); C Clarke, M Bradley (0-2); PJ O'Connell, N McKenna, S McNaughton (0-1)	Páirc Mac Uílín, Ballycastle; Referee: Tony Carroll

14 March 2015; 19:00; Round 4	Offaly	1-21 - 0-21	Limerick	Gaelic Grounds, Limerick; Referee: Sean Cleere
14 March 2015; 19:00; Round 4	S Dooley (0-10, 0-6 frees, 0-1 '65); E Nolan (1-2); J Bergin (0-3); S Quirke, D Mooney (0-2); D Currams, S Kinsella (0-1)	Report	S Tobin (0-9, 0-6 frees); P Browne (0-4); D O'Grady (0-2); D Hannon, D Reidy (0-1 free), J Ryan, D Breen, C Lynch, S O'Brien (0-1)	Gaelic Grounds, Limerick; Referee: Sean Cleere

15 March 2015; 12:45; Round 4	Waterford	4-30 - 0-10	Antrim	Walsh Park, Waterford; Referee: Diarmuid Kirwin
15 March 2015; 12:45; Round 4	Pauric Mahony (0-11, 0-6 frees); Maurice Shanahan (2-5); Stephen Bennett (1-4); Tom Devine (1-0); Michael Walsh (0-3); Paudie Prendergast, Jake Dillon (0-2); Colin Dunford, Kevin Moran, Shane O'Sullivan (0-1)	Report	Paul Shiels (0-5, 0-4 frees); Conor Johnson (0-2); Ciaran Johnson (0-2, 0-1 free); Shane McNaughton (0-1 free)	Walsh Park, Waterford; Referee: Diarmuid Kirwin

15 March 2015; 14:00; Round 4	Laois	0-25 - 5-22	Wexford	O'Moore Park, Portlaoise; Referee: John Keenan
15 March 2015; 14:00; Round 4	Zane Keenan (0-7, 0-4 frees); Willie Hyland (0-6); PJ Scully (0-3, 0-1 sideline); Cha Dwyer, Paddy Whelan (0-3); Paddy Purcell (0-2); Ross King (0-1)	Report	Ian Byrne (0-15, 0-11 frees, 0-1 '65), Conor McDonald (2-2); David Redmond (1-1); Liam Óg McGovern, Podge Doran (1-0); Liam Ryan, Lee Chin, Diarmuid O'Keeffe, Harry Kehoe (0-1)	O'Moore Park, Portlaoise; Referee: John Keenan

22 March 2015; 14:00; Round 5	Antrim	0-19 - 2-17	Offaly	Páirc Mac Uílín
22 March 2015; 14:00; Round 5	M Bradley (0-5); Conor Johnson (0-4, 0-2 frees); N McManus, P Shiels (0-2, 0-1 free); T McCann, S McCrory, D Hamill, C Carson, E Campbell, C Clarke (0-1)	Report	S Dooley (2-6, 0-5 frees); J Bergin (0-4); D Currams (0-3); B Carroll (0-2, 0-1 frees); S Quirke, C Kiely (0-1)	Páirc Mac Uílín

22 March 2015; 14:00; Round 5	Limerick	1-25 - 1-19	Laois	FitzGerald Park, Kilmallock
22 March 2015; 14:00; Round 5	S Tobin (0-12, 0-8 frees); T O'Brien (1-3, 0-1 sideline); D Hannon (0-3, 0-1 '65); D Reidy (0-3); D Breen, T Morrissey (0-1); A Murphy (0-1 free)	Report	Z Keenan (1-3, 1-0 penalty, 0-3 frees); PJ Scully (0-5, 0-3 frees); P Whelan (0-4); W Hyland (0-2, 0-1 sideline); C Dwyer (0-2); T Fitzgerald, D Palmer (0-1)	FitzGerald Park, Kilmallock

22 March 2015; 14:00; Round 5	Wexford	0-16 - 0-22	Waterford	Wexford Park
22 March 2015; 14:00; Round 5	Jack Guiney (0-6, 0-5 frees); Diarmuid O'Keeffe (0-3); Ian Byrne (0-3 frees); Liam Óg McGovern (0-2); Conor McDonald, Paudie Foley (0-1)	Report	Pauric Mahony (0-13, 0-11 frees); Jake Dillon (0-3); Colin Dunford (0-2); Stephen Bennett, Jamie Barron, Austin Gleeson, Tom Devine (0-1)	Wexford Park

==== Division 1B relegation play-off ====
28 March 2015; Relegation play-off	Laois	2-18 - 1-13	Antrim	O'Moore Park; Referee: D Hughes (Carlow)
28 March 2015; Relegation play-off	Z Keenan 1-6(0-fs); R King 1-2; PJ Scully 0-3; C Dwyer, J Campion 0-2 each; P Whelan, J Fitzpatrick, W Hyland 0-1 each	Report	C Clarke 1-5(0-4fs); P Shiels 0-4(3fs); N McManus, S McCrory, O McFadden, D McKernan 0-1 each.	O'Moore Park; Referee: D Hughes (Carlow)

==== Division 1B/2A promotion/relegation play-off ====
11 April 2015; 15:00; Promotion/relegation play-off	Kerry	2-16 - 1-18	Antrim	Parnell Park, Dublin; Referee: Sean Cleere
11 April 2015; 15:00; Promotion/relegation play-off	S Murphy; D Fitzell, P Costello, B Murphy; S Weir, D Dineen, D Collins (0-1); J Griffin (0-1), P Kelly (0-1); C Harty (2-0), S Nolan (0-8), M O'Leary (0-4); M Boyle, P Boyle, K Carmody. Subs: J Egan (0-1)	Report	C O'Connell; O McFadden, N McAuley (0-1), A Graffin; E McAlonan, N McManus (0-1), C McKinley; E Campbell, M Bradley (0-1); P Shiels (0-7), C Carson, D McKernan; PJ O'Connell (1-2), M Donnelly (0-1), C Clarke (0-3). Subs: C Johnson (0-1) M Dudley (0-1)	Parnell Park, Dublin; Referee: Sean Cleere

== Division 1 Knockout ==
=== Division 1 Final stages ===
Quarter-Finals
Limerick	0-16
Dublin	1-25
Cork	0-18
Wexford	0-14
Tipperary	1-16
Offaly	0-13
Waterford	0-20
Galway	0-12

Semi-Finals
Dublin	2-23
Cork	1-27
Tipperary	2-15
Waterford	1-19

Final
Waterford	1-24
Cork	0-17

==== Division 1 Quarter-Finals ====
28 March 2015; Division 1 Quarter Final C	Dublin	1-25 - 0-16	Limerick	Croke Park; Attendance: 19,224
28 March 2015; Division 1 Quarter Final C	David Treacy (0-9, 0-7 frees, 0-1 penalty); Mark Schutte (1-5); John McCaffrey, David O'Callaghan, Danny Sutcliffe, Niall McMorrow (0-2); Chris Crummey, Cian Boland, Liam Rushe (0-1)	Report	Shane Dowling (0-8, 0-7 frees, 0-1 '65); Graeme Mulcahy (0-4); Cian Lynch, James Ryan, Paudie O'Brien, Tom Morrissey (0-1)	Croke Park; Attendance: 19,224

29 March 2015; Division 1 Quarter Final B	Cork	0-18 - 0-14	Wexford	Páirc Uí Rinn
29 March 2015; Division 1 Quarter Final B	Patrick Horgan (0-10, 0-6 frees, 0-1 '65); Conor Lehane (0-3); Seamus Harnedy (0-2); Daniel Kearney, Rob O'Shea, Paudie O'Sullivan (0-1)	Report	Ian Byrne (0-4, 0-3 frees), Conor McDonald (0-3); Jack Guiney (0-2, 0-1 free), Garreth Sinnott, David Redmond, Daithi Waters, Diarmuid O'Keeffe, Liam Óg McGovern (0-1)	Páirc Uí Rinn

29 March 2015; Division 1 Quarter Final A	Offaly	0-13 - 1-16	Tipperary	O'Connor Park; Attendance: 4,234
29 March 2015; Division 1 Quarter Final A	Shane Dooley (0-7, 0-3 frees, 0-1 '65), Joe Bergin, Brian Carroll, Stephen Quirke (0-2)	Report	Seamus Callanan (1-6, 0-4 frees), Kieran Bergin, Brendan Maher (0-3); Jason Forde, Noel McGrath, Niall O'Meara, Ronan Maher (0-1)	O'Connor Park; Attendance: 4,234

29 March 2015; Division 1 Quarter Final D	Waterford	0-20 - 0-12	Galway	Walsh Park
29 March 2015; Division 1 Quarter Final D	Pauric Mahony (0-10, 0-9 frees); Kevin Moran, Brian O'Halloran (0-2); Austin Gleeson (0-2, 0-1 sideline); Jake Dillon, Tom Devine, Maurice Shanahan, Michael Walsh (0-1)	Report	Joe Canning (0-8, 0-6 frees, 0-1 '65); Cathal Mannion, Andy Smith (0-2)	Walsh Park

==== Division 1 Semi-Finals ====
19 April 2015; 14:00; Semi-Final	Cork	1-27 - 2-23	Dublin	Nowlan Park; Referee: James Owens
19 April 2015; 14:00; Semi-Final	Patrick Horgan (0-17,0-12f), C Lehane (0-4), P O’Sullivan (1-0), S Harnedy (0-3), L O'Farrell, A Cadogan, A Walsh (0-1) each	Report	P Ryan (0-7,0-4f), D O’Callaghan (1-3), M Schutte (1-3), L Rushe (0-3), D Treacy (0-2), C Keaney (0-2), J McCaffrey (0-2)	Nowlan Park; Referee: James Owens

19 April 2015; 16:00; Semi-Final	Tipperary	2-15 - 1-19	Waterford	Nowlan Park; Attendance: 16,445; Referee: B Kelly (Westmeath)
19 April 2015; 16:00; Semi-Final	S Callanan (0-8, 6f), J O’Dwyer (1-01), N O’Meara (0-02), J Woodlock (0-01), Patrick Maher (1-00), J Forde (0-01), C Kenny (0-1), P Maher (0-1).	Report	Pauric Mahony (0-13, 11f), C Dunford (1-01), M Shanahan (0-03), J Baron (0-01), J Dillon (0-01).	Nowlan Park; Attendance: 16,445; Referee: B Kelly (Westmeath)

==== Division 1 Final ====
3 May 2015; 15:30; Division 1 Final	Waterford	1-24 - 0-17	Cork	Semple Stadium; Attendance: 17,559; Referee: Johnny Ryan
3 May 2015; 15:30; Division 1 Final	Pauric Mahony (0-11, 8f, 1 '45), T Devine (1-1), K Moran (0-3), M Walsh (0-2), M Shanahan (0-2), A Gleeson (0-2, 1 sideline), J Barron (0-1), S Bennett (0-1), B O'Halloran (0-1)	Report	Patrick Horgan (0-7, 7f), C Lehane (0-4), S Hardeny (0-2), A Walsh (0-1), B Cooper (0-1), S Harnedy (0-2), R O'Shea (0-1)	Semple Stadium; Attendance: 17,559; Referee: Johnny Ryan

=== Top scorers ===
Overall

Rank	Player	County	Tally	Total	Matches	Average
1	Patrick Horgan	Cork	2-87	93	8	11.62
1	Pauric Mahony	Waterford	1-90	93	8	11.62
2	Shane Dooley	Offaly	4-55	67	6	11.16
3	Séamus Callanan	Tipperary	3-45	54	7	7.71
4	Zane Keenan	Laois	2-44	50	6	8.33
5	Richie Hogan	Kilkenny	1-43	46	5	9.20
6	Paul Shiels	Antrim	2-37	43	7	6.14
7	David Treacy	Dublin	0-35	35	5	7.00
8	Jack Guiney	Wexford	2-26	32	5	6.40
9	Paul Ryan	Dublin	0-32	32		

== Division 2 ==
=== Division 2A ===
==== Round Robin ====
Division final and possible promotion Relegation

Team	Pld	W	D	L	F	A	Diff	Pts
Westmeath	5	4	0	1	10-84	6-57	39	8
Kerry	5	3	1	1	6-87	9-65	13	7
Carlow	5	3	0	2	11-74	4-64	31	6
Derry	5	2	1	2	5-60	5-60	0	5
London	5	1	0	4	7-46	11-71	-37	2
Wicklow	5	1	0	4	6-46	10-79	-45	2

- London are ranked ahead of Wicklow because they won the head-to-head match between the teams (8 March at Arklow: 3-12 to 2-12).

15 February 2015; 13:25; Round 1	Kerry	0-14 - 0-14	Derry	Austin Stack Park, Tralee; Referee: Justin Heffernan
15 February 2015; 13:25; Round 1		Report		Austin Stack Park, Tralee; Referee: Justin Heffernan

15 February 2015; 12:00; Round 1	Westmeath	2-20 - 1-8	London	Cusack Park, Mullingar; Referee: David Hughes

15 February 2015; 14:00; Round 1	Carlow	3-17 - 1-6	Wicklow	Dr. Cullen Park, Carlow; Referee: Fergal Horgan

21 February 2015; 13:00; Round 2	Carlow	3-12 - 0-7	London	Emerald GAA Grounds, Ruislip; Referee: Declan O'Driscoll

22 February 2015; 13:00; Round 2	Kerry	2-20 - 1-6	Wicklow	Aughrim County Ground, Aughrim; Referee: Sean Cleere

22 February 2015; 14:00; Round 2	Derry	2-15 - 3-10	Westmeath	Owenbeg, Dungiven; Referee: Liam McAuley

8 March 2015; 12:45; Round 3	Carlow	1-15 - 1-13	Derry	Celtic Park, Derry; Referee: Owen Elliot

8 March 2015; 13:00; Round 3	London	3-12 - 2-12	Wicklow	Arklow; Referee: Paud O'Dwyer

8 March 2015; 13:00; Round 3	Westmeath	3-18 - 0-12	Kerry	Austin Stack Park, Tralee; Referee: John O'Brien

1 March 2015; 14:00; Round 4	Derry	1-10 - 1-9	London	Greenford; Referee: John O'Brien

15 March 2015; 12:00; Round 4	Kerry	1-24 - 3-17	Carlow	Dr. Cullen Park, Carlow; Referee: Justin Heffernan

15 March 2015; 12:45; Round 4	Westmeath	1-22 - 2-10	Wicklow	Cusack Park, Mullingar; Referee: Eamonn Hassan

22 March 2015; 14:00; Round 5	Kerry	3-17 - 2-10	London	Austin Stack Park, Tralee; Referee: D. O'Driscoll

22 March 2015; 14:00; Round 5	Derry	1-08 - 0-12	Wicklow	Owenbeg, Dungiven; Referee: J. Clarke

22 March 2015; 14:00; Round 5	Westmeath	1-14 - 1-13	Carlow	Cusack Park, Mullingar; Referee: S. Cleere

==== Division 2A Final ====
4 April 2015; 15:00; Division 2A Final	Kerry	5-17 - 3-17	Westmeath	Gaelic Grounds, Limerick; Referee: T Carroll (Offaly)
4 April 2015; 15:00; Division 2A Final	M Boyle 2-2, P Boyle 0-7 (6fs), S Nolan 1-3, C Harty 1-2, K Carmody 1-0, J Griffin, P Kelly, J Flaherty 0-1 each.	Report	D Clinton 1-4, D McNicholas 2-1, N O'Brien 0-5 (5fs), B Murtagh (1f), C Boyle 0-2 each, E Price, A Devine, N Dowdall 0-1 each.	Gaelic Grounds, Limerick; Referee: T Carroll (Offaly)

=== Division 2B ===
==== Round Robin ====
Division final and possible promotion Relegation play-off

Team	Pld	W	D	L	F	A	Diff	Pts
Kildare	5	5	0	0	9-101	8-65	39	10
Meath	5	3	0	2	8-74	2-70	20	6
Down	5	3	0	2	8-80	6-69	17	6
Armagh	5	3	0	2	5-81	7-71	4	6
Mayo	5	1	0	4	4-62	9-84	-37	2
Donegal	5	0	0	5	9-46	11-83	-43	0

- Meath, Down and Armagh are ranked by score difference.

15 February 2015; 14:00; Round 1	Mayo	3-14 - 1-12	Donegal	O'Donnell Park, Letterkenny; Referee: Colum Cunning

15 February 2015; 14:00; Round 1	Down	1-13 - 0-9	Armagh	McKenna Park, Ballycran; Referee: Liam McAuley

15 February 2015; 14:00; Round 1	Kildare	0-24 - 0-14	Meath	Trim; Referee: Paud O'Dwyer

22 February 2015; 14:00; Round 2	Armagh	1-18 - 2-10	Donegal	Athletic Grounds, Armagh; Referee: Colum Cunning

22 February 2015; 14:00; Round 2	Kildare	2-15 - 1-12	Down	St Conleth's Park, Newbridge; Referee: Patrick Murphy

22 February 2015; 14:00; Round 2	Meath	3-8 - 0-9	Mayo	MacHale Park, Castlebar; Referee: John Keane

7 March 2015; 14:00; Round 3	Meath	2-15 - 1-4	Donegal	O'Donnell Park, Letterkenny; Referee: Liam McAuley

7 March 2015; 17:15; Round 3	Kildare	3-23 - 3-14	Armagh	Athletic Grounds, Armagh; Referee: Eamon Hasson

8 March 2015; 14:00; Round 3	Down	2-21 - 0-15	Mayo	MacHale Park, Castlebar; Referee: Declan O'Driscoll

15 March 2015; 14:45; Round 4	Kildare	3-20 - 1-14	Mayo	St Conleth's Park, Newbridge; Referee: Patrick Murphy

15 March 2015; 14:00; Round 4	Down	4-17 - 2-9	Donegal	McKenna Park, Ballycran; Referee: Kevin Brady

15 March 2015; 14:00; Round 4	Armagh	1-17 - 1-15	Meath	Trim; Referee: Justin Heffernan

22 March 2015; 14:00; Round 5	Donegal	3-11 - 1-19	Kildare	O'Donnell Park, Letterkenny

22 March 2015; 14:00; Round 5	Mayo	0-10 - 0-23	Armagh	MacHale Park, Castlebar

22 March 2015; 14:00; Round 5	Meath	2-21 - 0-17	Down	Trim

==== Division 2B Final ====
4 April 2015; 15:00; Division 2B Final	Kildare	0-22 - 0-17	Meath	Cusack Park, Mullingar; Referee: Colum Cunning

==== Division 2B relegation play-off ====
28 March 2015; Relegation play-off	Mayo	2-13 - 1-11	Donegal	Carrick on Shannon

==== Division 2B/3A promotion/relegation play-off ====
11 April 2015; 17:00; Promotion/relegation play-off	Donegal	4-13 - 4-13; AET	Tyrone	Celtic Park, Owenbeg; Referee: James Clarke
11 April 2015; 17:00; Promotion/relegation play-off		Report		Celtic Park, Owenbeg; Referee: James Clarke

18 April 2015; 15:00; Promotion/relegation play-off Replay	Donegal	2-16 — 2-12	Tyrone	Celtic Park, Owenbeg

== Division 3 ==
=== Division 3A ===
==== Round Robin ====
Division final and possible promotion Relegation

Team	Pld	W	D	L	F	A	Diff	Pts
Tyrone	5	4	1	0	8-77	8-53	24	9
Monaghan	5	4	2	0	7-76	7-76	19	8
Roscommon	5	3	0	2	6-84	3-57	36	6
Fingal	5	1	2	2	9-68	8-88	-17	4
Louth	5	1	1	3	12-60	9-83	-14	3
Fermanagh	5	0	0	5	6-49	14-73	-48	0

15 February 2015; 14:00; Round 1	Fingal	3-13 - 1-16	Fermanagh	Brewster Park, Enniskillen; Referee: Kevin Brady

15 February 2015; 14:00; Round 1	Roscommon	1-21 - 1-9	Louth	Athleague; Referee: Gearoid McGrath

15 February 2015; 14:00; Round 1	Tyrone	1-13 - 2-10	Monaghan	Healy Park, Omagh; Referee: James Clarke

22 February 2015; 14:00; Round 2	Tyrone	1-16 - 1-15	Fingal	Swords; Referee: Gavin Quilty

22 February 2015; 14:00; Round 2	Louth	4-17 - 3-7	Fermanagh	Darver, Louth Centre of Excellence; Referee: Kevin McGeeney

22 February 2015; 14:00; Round 2	Monaghan	0-17 - 1-10	Roscommon	Castleblayney; Referee: James Clarke

8 March 2015; 14:00; Round 3	Tyrone	4-14 - 2-8	Fermanagh	Brewster Park, Enniskillen; Referee: James Clarke

8 March 2015; 14:00; Round 3	Roscommon	3-24 - 1-11	Fingal	St. Maurs, Rush; Referee: Patrick Murphy

8 March 2015; 14:00; Round 3	Monaghan	2-18 - 2-13	Louth	Dowdallshill, Dundalk; Referee: Colum Cunning

15 March 2015; 12:30; Round 4	Monaghan	0-18 - 2-12	Fingal	St Tiernach's Park; Referee: Owen Elliott

15 March 2015; 12:45; Round 4	Tyrone	1-20 - 2-7	Louth	Healy Park, Omagh; Referee: James Clarke

15 March 2015; 14:00; Round 4	Roscommon	0-16 - 0-6	Fermanagh	Athleague; Referee: Gavin Quilty

22 March 2015; 14:00; Round 5	Fermanagh	0-12 - 3-13	Monaghan	Brewster Park, Enniskillen

22 March 2015; 14:00; Round 5	Fingal	2-17 - 3-14	Louth	Swords

22 March 2015; 14:00; Round 5	Tyrone	1-14 - 1-13	Roscommon	Healy Park, Omagh

==== Division 3A Final ====
4 April 2015; 15:00; Division 3A Final	Tyrone	0-18 - 1-11	Monaghan	Keady, Armagh; Referee: Liam McAuley

=== Division 3B ===
==== Round Robin ====
Division final and possible promotion

Team	Pld	W	D	L	F	A	Diff	Pts
Longford	3	3	0	0	7-53	2-30	38	4
Warwickshire	3	2	0	1	10-43	6-44	11	4
Leitrim	3	1	0	2	5-39	6-45	-9	2
Sligo	3	0	0	3	2-33	10-49	-40	0

7 March 2015; 14:00; Round 1	Warwickshire	5-14 - 0-14	Sligo	Páirc na hÉireann, Birmingham; Referee: John Keane

8 March 2015; 14:00; Round 1	Longford	1-17 - 0-10	Leitrim	Páirc Seán Mac Diarmada, Carrick-on-Shannon; Referee: Kevin McGeeney

14 March 2015; 14:00; Round 2	Longford	2-16 - 2-11	Warwickshire	Pearse Park, Longford; Referee: Gearoid McGrath

15 March 2015; 12:45; Round 2	Leitrim	1-15 - 2-10	Sligo	Markievicz Park, Sligo; Referee: Kevin McGeeney

22 March 2015; 14:00; Round 3	Warwickshire	3-18 - 4-14	Leitrim	Páirc na hÉireann, Birmingham; Referee: K. Burke

28 March 2015; 15:00; Round 3	Longford	4-20 - 0-9	Sligo	Pearse Park, Longford

==== Division 3B Final ====
4 April 2015; 15:00; Division 3B Final	Warwickshire	1-15 - 2-10	Longford	Donaghmore, Ashbourne, Meath; Referee: Gavin Quilty
4 April 2015; 15:00; Division 3B Final		Report		Donaghmore, Ashbourne, Meath; Referee: Gavin Quilty

Preceded by 2014 National Hurling League	National Hurling League	Succeeded by 2016 National Hurling League
