= 2013 Waterford Senior Hurling Championship =

Annual hurling competition season

The 2013 Waterford Senior Hurling Championship was the 113th staging of the Waterford Senior Hurling Championship since its establishment in 1887. The championship ended on 13 October 2013.

De La Salle were the defending champions, however, they were defeated at the quarter-finals stage. Passage won the title, following a 3–16 to 3–13 defeat of Ballygunner in the final.

== Teams ==
=== Overview ===
All but one of the twelve teams from the 2012 championship are participated in the top tier of Waterford hurling in 2013.

An Rinn, who defeated Portlaw by 1–14 to 0–4 in the final of the intermediate championship in 2012, availed of their right to automatic promotion to the senior championship.

Similarly, Ballyduff Upper defeated Dunhill by 1–20 to 0–18 in the 2012 relegation play-off, and so Dunhill were relegated to the intermediate grade for 2013.

== Results ==
=== Group 1 ===
Pos	Team	Pld	W	D	L	SF	SA	Diff	Pts	Notes
1	De La Salle	5	4	0	1	10–76	5–51	40	8	
2	Fourmilewater	5	4	0	1	3–73	3–63	10	8	
3	Ballyduff Upper	5	2	1	2	4–71	6–81	−13	5	
4	Tallow	5	2	1	2	6–59	6–72	−13	5	
5	Lismore	5	2	0	3	16–79	6–74	35	4	
6	An Rinn	5	0	0	5	2–62	16–79	−59	0	

=== Group 2 ===
Pos	Team	Pld	W	D	L	SF	SA	Diff	Pts	Notes
1	Passage	5	3	1	1	10–70	8–80	6	7	
2	Abbeyside	5	3	0	2	11–81	9–68	19	6	
3	Ballygunner	5	3	0	2	8–79	4–74	17	6	
4	Mount Sion	4	3	0	1	4–66	3–63	6	6	
5	Dungarvan	5	1	1	3	7–78	5–73	11	3	
6	Roanmore	4	0	0	4	4–52	15–68	−59	0	

=== Quarter-finals ===
14 September Quarter-final	Ballygunner	1–21 – 0–15 (AET)	De La Salle	Walsh Park
	Pauric Mahony 0–15 (11fs, 1 65’); B Coughlan 1–0; D O’Sullivan 0–2; JJ Hutchinson, B O’Sullivan, S O’Sullivan, S Power 0–1 each.	Report	J Dillon 0–9 (7fs); D Twomey 0–2; A Farrell, J Keane, J Mullane, K Moran 0–1 each.	Referee: T O'Sullivan

14 September Quarter-final	Abbeyside	3–16 – 0–6	Fourmilewater	Fraher Field
	M Gorman (0–11, 6fs, 2 65), P Hurney (2–2), D Collins (1- 0, s-l) G Breen, G Hurney, M Ferncombe (0–1 each).	Report	J Barron (0–3, 3fs) Seamus Lawlor (0–2), T O’Gorman (0–1).	Referee: P Casey

15 September Quarter-final	Passage	1–19 – 0–17	Ballyduff Upper	Fraher Field
	E Kelly 0–7 (6fs), O Connors 1–2, K Fitzgerald 0–3, C Carey, J Whitty 0–2 each, M Baldwin, S Barry, S Mason 0–1 each.	Report	Mikey Kearney 0–11 (6fs, 1 65’), J Kearney 0–2, K Casey, B Kearney, C Leamy, G Feeney 0–1 each.	Referee: M Wadding

15 September Quarter-final	Mount Sion	2–22 – 1–7	Tallow	Fraher Field
	A Gleeson 0–9 (5fs, 1 65’) S Roche 0–8 (7fs), M ‘F’ O’Neill 1–1, S Ryan 1–0, M Gaffney, I O’Regan (f), R Roche, O Whelan 0–1 each.	Report	P Kearney 0–4 (3fs), W Henley 1–0, W Curley, P O’Brien, T Ryan 0–1 each.	Referee: T O'Sullivan

=== Semi-finals ===
29 September Semi-final	Passage	3–15 – 2–13	Mount Sion	Walsh Park
	C Carey, S Hogan 1–1 each, O Connors 0–4 (3fs), E Kelly 0–3 (2fs, 1 65’), R Walsh 1–0 each, P Walsh, J Whitty 0–2 each, S Mason, K Fitzgerald 0–1 each.	Report	M Gaffney 1–1, A Gleeson (2fs), S Roche (2fs) 0–4 each, R Roche 1–0, R Bresnan, E McGrath, I O’Regan (f), MF O'Neill 0–1 each.	Referee: P Casey

29 September Semi-final	Ballygunner	1–13 – 0–11	Abbeyside	Walsh Park
	P Mahony 0–8 (7Fs), JJ Hutchinson 1–0, B O'Sullivan 0–2, S O'Sullivan, S Power and H Barnes 0–1 each.	Report	M Gorman 0–4 (Fs), M Ferncombe 0–2, S O’Donovan, G Hurney, D Collins, M Fives and S Enright (pen.) 0–1 each.	Referee: M O'Brien

=== Final ===
13 October Final	Passage	3–16 – 3–13	Ballygunner	Walsh Park
	O Connors 1–7 (0–6 fs, 0–1 65); E Kelly 0–5 (0–4 fs); C Carey, S Hogan 1–0 each; K Fitzgerald 0–2; J Whitty and J Roche 0–1 each.	Report	P Mahony 1–7 (0–5 fs, 0–1 65); S Power 1–2; JJ Hutchinson 1–0; H Barnes 0–2; D O'Sullivan, Brian O'Sullivan 0–1 each.	Referee: T O'Sullivan (Cappoquin)
