= 2017 Waterford Senior Hurling Championship =

Annual hurling competition season

- Dates: 15 April 2017 – 22 October 2017
- Teams: 12
- Sponsor: J. J. Kavanagh & Sons
- Champions: Ballygunner (16th title); Shane Walsh (captain); Fergal Hartley (manager)
- Runners-up: De La Salle; Eddie Barrett (captain)

The 2017 Waterford Senior Hurling Championship is the 117th staging of the Waterford Senior Hurling Championship since its establishment by the Waterford County Board in 1887.

== Group stage ==
=== Group 1 ===
==== Group 1 Table ====
Pos	Team	Pld	W	D	L	For	Ag.	Diff.	Pts.
1	Ballygunner	2	2	0	0	63	18	45	4
2	De La Salle	2	2	0	0	53	42	11	4
3	Dungarvan	2	1	0	1	51	40	11	2
4	Abbeyside	2	1	0	1	27	43	−16	2
5	Ballyduff Upper	2	0	0	2	29	50	−21	0
6	Tallow	2	0	0	2	23	53	−30	0

==== Round 1 Group 1 ====
16 April 2017; 14:00	De La Salle	0–21 – 1–13	Ballyduff Upper	Fraher Field; Referee: Thomas Walsh (Modeligo); Man of the Match: John Mullane
16 April 2017; 14:00	Shane Ryan 0–8 (0-6f), John Mullane 0–4, Jack Fagan 0–3, Dylan Foley and Eddie Meaney 0–2 each, Kevin Moran and Eoin Madigan 0–1 each		Mikey Kearney 0–8 (0-3f, 2 '65), Kevin Casey 1–0, Shane Kearney, Seamus Hannon, Eoghan Murray, Jamie Kearney, Eoin O'Brien 0–1 each	Fraher Field; Referee: Thomas Walsh (Modeligo); Man of the Match: John Mullane

16 April 2017; 15:30	Ballygunner	3–25 – 0–5	Tallow	Fraher Field; Referee: Thomas O'Sullivan (Cappoquin); Man of the Match: Barry O'Sullivan
16 April 2017; 15:30	Pauric Mahony 1–9 (0-6f, 1 '65), Conor Power and Tim O'Sullivan 1–1 each, Barry O'Sullivan 0–4, Harley Barnes, David O'Sullivan, Billy O'Keefe 0–2 each, Wayne Hutchinson, Peter Hogan, Conor Sheehan, David Walsh 0–1 each		Tommy Ryan 0–4 (0-2f, 1 '65) and Darah Buckley 0–1	Fraher Field; Referee: Thomas O'Sullivan (Cappoquin); Man of the Match: Barry O'Sullivan

16 April 2017; 19:00	Dungarvan	2–19 – 0–8	Abbeyside	Fraher Field; Referee: Michael O'Brien (Portlaw); Man of the Match: Cathal Curran
16 April 2017; 19:00	Cormac Curran 1–7 (0-7f), Cathal Curran 0–4, Ryan Donnelly 1–0, Liam Ryan 0–3, Gavin Crotty and Colm Curran 0–2 each, Jamie Nagle 0–1		Mark Ferncombe 0–5 (0-4f), Richie Foley 0–2, John Elsted 0–1	Fraher Field; Referee: Michael O'Brien (Portlaw); Man of the Match: Cathal Curran

==== Round 2 Group 1 ====
21 April 2017; 19:30	De La Salle	4–20 – 3–17	Dungarvan	Fraher Field; Referee: Anthony Fitzgerald (Passage); Man of the Match: Shane Ryan

22 April 2017; 19:30	Ballygunner	1–26 – 0–13	Ballyduff Upper	Fraher Field; Referee: Noel Kelly (Erin's Own); Man of the Match: Brian O'Sullivan

23 April 2017; 19:00	Tallow	0–18 – 0–19	Abbeyside	Fraher Field; Referee: Nicky O'Toole (St. Paul's); Man of the Match: Neil Montgomery

==== Round 3 Group 1 ====
15 September 2017; 20:00; Round 3	Tallow	0–20 – 0–19	Ballyduff Upper	Fraher Field; Referee: Alan Kissane (Dunhill)

16 September 2017; 14:30; Round 3	De La Salle	3–20 – 0–14	Abbeyside	Walsh Park; Referee: Michael O'Brien

17 September 2017; 19:00; Round 3	Ballygunner	2–18 – 1–17	Dungarvan	Fraher Field; Referee: Thomas O'Sullivan

==== Round 4 Group 1 ====
24 September 2017; 15:30	Ballygunner	1–28 – 0–12	Abbeyside	Walsh Park; Referee: Alan Kissane (Dunhill)

24 September 2017; 17:30	De La Salle	1–17 – 1–17	Tallow	Fraher Field; Referee: Pat Casey

24 September 2017; 19:00	Dungarvan	2–27 – 1–11	Ballyduff Upper	Fraher Field; Referee: Michael Wadding

==== Round 5 Group 1 ====
2017	v

2017	v

2017	v

=== Group 2 ===
==== Group 2 Table ====
Pos	Team	Pld	W	D	L	For	Ag.	Diff.	Pts.
1	Lismore	2	2	0	0	55	47	8	4
2	Passage	2	1	0	1	54	43	11	2
3	Mount Sion	2	1	0	1	34	31	3	2
4	Fourmilewater	2	1	0	1	42	40	2	2
5	Roanmore	2	1	0	1	28	33	−5	2
6	Portlaw	2	0	0	2	27	46	−19	0

==== Round 1 Group 2 ====
15 April 2017; 14:00	Roanmore	1–17 – 1–12	Portlaw	Walsh Park; Referee: Anthony Fitzgerald (Passage)
15 April 2017; 14:00	Billy Nolan 0–6 (0-4f, 1 '65), Emmet O'Toole 0–5 (0-1f), Paul O'Sullivan 1–2, Dean Reidy and Daniel Murphy 0–2 each		DJ Foran 1–6 (1−5f), Tommy McGrath 0–3, Jack Walsh, Niall Fitzgerald, Frank Galvin 0–1 each	Walsh Park; Referee: Anthony Fitzgerald (Passage)

15 April 2017; 18:00	Lismore	6–13 – 3–19	Passage	Fraher Field; Referee: Nicky O'Toole (St. Paul's); Man of the Match: Dan Shanahan
15 April 2017; 18:00	Maurice Shanahan 2–8 (0-7f), Dan Shanahan 4–1, Ray Barry (0-1f), Kenny Moore, Jack Prendergast (0-1f), Brendan Landers 0–1 each		Eoin Kelly 1–5 (0−5f), John Whitty and Thomas Connors 1–1 each, Owen Connors 0–4 (0-3f), Pa Walsh 0–3, Killian Fitzgerald 0-2f, Adam Roche, Liam Flynn, Richard Hurley 0–1 each	Fraher Field; Referee: Nicky O'Toole (St. Paul's); Man of the Match: Dan Shanahan

15 April 2017; 19:30	Mount Sion	1–13 – 0–23	Fourmilewater	Fraher Field; Referee: Alan Kissane (Dunhill); Man of the Match: Conor Gleeson
15 April 2017; 19:30	Martin O'Neill 0–7 (0-6f), Austin Gleeson 0–5 (1 sl), Stephen Roche 1–0, Donal Power 0–1		Jamie Barron (0-6f) and Conor Gleeson 0–6 each, Dylan Guiry 0–4 (0-1f), Tom Barron 0–3, Shane Walsh 0–2, Diarmuid Murphy and Seamus Lawlor 0–1 each	Fraher Field; Referee: Alan Kissane (Dunhill); Man of the Match: Conor Gleeson

==== Round 2 Group 2 ====
22 April 2017; 18:00	Lismore	3–15 – 1–16	Fourmilewater	Fraher Field; Referee: Michael O'Brien (Portlaw); Man of the Match: Maurice Shanahan

23 April 2017; 14:00	Passage	2–20 – 0–12	Portlaw	Walsh Park; Referee: Pat Casey (Cappoquin)

23 April 2017; 15:30	Roanmore	0–8 – 0–18	Mount Sion	Walsh Park; Referee: Alan Kissane (Dunhill)

==== Round 3 Group 2 ====
16 September 2017; 16:00	Passage	2–8 – 0–9	Mount Sion	Walsh Park; Referee: Nicky O'Toole

16 September 2017; 17:30	Fourmilewater	0–19 – 1–12	Roanmore	Fraher Field; Referee: Pat Casey

16 September 2017; 19:00	Lismore	2–15 – 1–10	Portlaw	Fraher Field; Referee: Nollaig O'Ceallaigh

==== Round 4 Group 2 ====
22 September 2017; 20:00	Roanmore	2–16 – 1–17	Lismore	Fraher Field; Referee: Thomas O'Sullivan

23 September 2017; 19:00	Passage	1–13 – 1–9	Fourmilewater	Fraher Field; Referee: Nollaig O'Ceallaigh

24 September 2017; 14:00	Mount Sion	3–18 – 0–11	Portlaw	Walsh Park; Referee: Anthony Fitzgerald

==== Round 5 Group 2 ====
2017	v

2017	v

2017	v

== Quarter-finals ==
7 October 2017	Ballygunner	0–29 – 0–9	Mount Sion	Walsh Park
4:00 pm	P Mahony 0–12 (0-6f, 1 sl), B O'Sullivan 0–7, D O'Sullivan 0–4, B O'Keefe and P Hogan 0–2 each, H Barnes and C Power 0–1 each		S Roche 0–3 (0-2f), O Whelan and A Gleeson (0-2f) 0–2 each, M O'Neill and D Power 0–1 each	Referee: Thomas O'Sullivan (Cappoquin)

7 October 2017	Lismore	3–17 – 4–13	Abbeyside	Fraher Field
7:30 pm	Maurice Shanahan 0–8 (0−5f, 1 '65), Dan Shanahan 2–1, Stevie Barry 0–4, Jordan Shanahan 1–0, Jack Prendergast 0–2, Paudie Prendergast and John Prendergast 0–1 each		Mark Ferncombe 3–7 (0-3f, 1 '65), Tom Looby 1–0, Patrick Hurney 0–2, Conor Prunty, John Elsted, Michael O'Halloran, Eoin Kiely 0–1 each	Attendance: 5,520; Referee: Anthony Fitzgerald (Passage); Man of the Match: Mark Ferncombe

8 October 2017	De La Salle	1–19 – 0–15	Fourmilewater	Fraher Field
1:45 pm	Shane Ryan 1–8 (0-7f), Kevin Moran, Jack Fagan, John Mullane 0–2 each, Shane McNulty, Adam Farrell, Jake Dillon, Paidi Nevin, Kenneth Byrne 0–1 each		Dylan Guiry 0–8 (0-7f), Conor Gleeson and Tom Barron 0–2 each, Shane Ryan, Jame Barron, Michael O'Gorman 0–1 each	Referee: Alan Kissane (Dunhill); Man of the Match: Kevin Moran

8 October 2017	Passage	1–14 – 0–15	Dungarvan	Fraher Field
3:15 pm	Owen Connors 0–7 (0−5f), Killian Fitzgerald 0–3, Eoin Kelly 1–0, John Whitty 0–2, Adam Roche and Liam Flynn 0–1 each		Patrick Curran 0−5f, Kieran Power, Gavin Crotty (1 '65), Ryan Donnelly, Michael Kiely 0–2 each, Colm Curran and Cathal Curran 0–1 each	Referee: Michael O'Brien (Portlaw); Man of the Match: Owen Connors

== Semi-finals ==
15 October 2017; 2:00 pm	De La Salle	1–13 – 3–6	Passage	Walsh Park; Referee: Pat Casey (Cappoquin); Man of the Match: Kevin Moran
15 October 2017; 2:00 pm		Report		Walsh Park; Referee: Pat Casey (Cappoquin); Man of the Match: Kevin Moran

15 October 2017; 6:30 pm	Ballygunner	0–18 – 1–13	Lismore	Fraher Field, Dungarvan; Referee: Michael O'Brien (Portlaw); Man of the Match: Brian O'Sullivan
15 October 2017; 6:30 pm		Report		Fraher Field, Dungarvan; Referee: Michael O'Brien (Portlaw); Man of the Match: Brian O'Sullivan

== Final ==
22 October 2017; 3:00 pm	Ballygunner	2–18 – 0–16	De La Salle	Walsh Park; Attendance: 2,709; Referee: Thomas O'Sullivan (Cappoquin); Man of the Match: Philip Mahony
22 October 2017; 3:00 pm	Pauric Mahony 0–9 (0-7f), Conor Power 2–0, David O'Sullivan 0–3, Brian O'Sullivan 0–2, Shane Walsh, Shane O'Sullivan, Peter Hogan, Billy O'Keefe 0–1 each	Report	Shane Ryan 0-8f, Jack Fagan 0–3 (0-1f, 1 sl), Kevin Moran, Paidi Nevin, Adam Farrell, John Mullane, Thomas Douglas (0-1f) 0–1 each	Walsh Park; Attendance: 2,709; Referee: Thomas O'Sullivan (Cappoquin); Man of the Match: Philip Mahony
