= 2009 Waterford Senior Hurling Championship =

Annual hurling competition season

Waterford Senior Hurling Championship 2009
Waterford Champions
Winners	Ballygunner
Captain	Colin Kehoe
Manager	Ger Cunningham
Player of the year	TBA
Relegated	Rinn Ó gCuanach

The 2009 Waterford Senior Hurling Championship commenced on 25 April and concluded on 17 October 2009. De La Salle were the defending champions, having beaten Abbeyside in the 2008 final. Ballygunner defeated Lismore in the 2009 final following a replay. Due to complications with the former structure of the championship in 2008, it had been decided that the 12 teams would be structured into two groups of six. The top four teams from each group advanced to the quarter-final stage, from which the semi-finals and the final were played. The final and replay were played in Walsh Park in October 2009. The teams which finished last in each group played in a relegation playoff match. The losing team, Rinn Ó gCuanach, have been demoted to Intermediate for 2010.

== Group A ==
=== Standings ===
P	Team	Pld	W	D	L	PF	PA	PD	Pts
1	Mount Sion	5	5	0	0	102	69	+33	10
2	Ballyduff Upper	5	3	0	2	114	98	+16	6
3	Lismore	5	3	0	2	93	86	+7	6
4	De La Salle	5	3	0	2	94	89	+5	6
5	Fourmilewater	5	1	0	4	81	76	+5	2
6	Rinn Ó gCuanach	5	0	0	4	49	115	−66	0

Qualification
Qualified for quarter-finals
Entered for relegation playoff

=== Matches ===
==== Round 1 ====
25 April 2009
Round 1

Ballyduff Upper	1–22 – 2–17	Fourmilewater
B. Hannon 0–12; J. Kearney 0–4; S. Kearney 1–1; S. Molumphy 0–2; B. Kearney 0–2; S. Hannon 0–1	(Report)	R. Fenton 0–9; S. Walsh 1–3; T. O'Gorman 1–1; A. Lawlor 0–3; T. Walsh 0–1

Castle Grounds, Lismore
Referee: Tim O'Byrne

25 April 2009
Round 1

Lismore	4–12 – 1–09	Rinn Ó gCuanach
M. Shanahan 1–4; J. Prendergast 2–1; D. Shanahan 1–1; P. Prendergast 0–1; J. Shanahan 0–1	(Report)	P. Murchadha 1–5; L. O Lionain 0–1; M. Tobin 0–1; S. O Currin 0–1; N. Murchadha 0–1

Fraher Field, Dungarvan
Referee: Jim Murphy

26 April 2009
Round 1

De La Salle	1–08 – 1–17	Mount Sion
J. Mullane 0–6; B. Phelan 0–2; D. Twomey 1–0	(Report)	M. O'Neill 1–5; S. Ryan 0–3; I. Galgey 0–3; R. O'Keefe 0–2; J. Phelan 0–2; B. Cusack 0–1; T. Browne 0–1

Walsh Park, Waterford
Referee: Tommy Sullivan

==== Round 2 ====
3 May 2009
Round 2

Ballyduff Upper	1–12 – 0–14	Lismore
P. Kearney 1–3; B. Hannon 0–5; B. Kearney 0–2; J. Kearney 0–1; A. Power 0–1	(Report)	M. Shanahan 0–8; D. Shanahan 0–2; P. Prendergast 0–1; B. Landers 0–1; J. Prendergast 0–1; D. Bennett 0–1

Cappoquin, County Waterford
Referee: Tim O'Byrne

2 May 2009
Round 2

Fourmilewater	2–08 – 2–09	Mount Sion
S. Ryan 1–1; M. O'Neill 0–3; E. McGrath 1–0; R. O'Keeffe 0–2; B. Cusack 0–1; K. McGrath 0–1; T. Browne 0–1	(Report)	S. Walsh 2–0; R. Fenton 0–5; A. Lawlor 0–1; T. O'Gorman

Fraher Field, Dungarvan
Referee: Pat Casey

2 May 2009
Round 2

De La Salle	0–16 – 1–09	Rinn Ó gCuanach
J. Mullane 0–4; B. Farrell 0–3; B. Phelan 0–3; J. Quirke 0–2; D. Twomey 0–1; P. Nevin 0–1; C. Watt 0–1	(Report)	N. O Murchadha 1–1; P. O Murchadha 0–3; T. O hUallacháin 0–2; L. O Lionain 0–2; C. O Conchúir 0–1

Fraher Field, Dungarvan
Referee: Vinny O'Toole

==== Round 3 ====
3 May 2009
Round 3

Mount Sion	2–18 – 0–08	Rinn Ó gCuanach
M. O'Neill 1–5; R. O'Keeffe 1–4; E. McGrath 0–3; K. McGrath 0–2; T. Browne 0–1; I. Power 0–1; B. Cusack 0–1; I. Galgey 0–1	(Report)	P. Ó Murchadha 0–4; L. Ó Lionain 0–2; M. Ó Tobin 0–2

Fraher Field, Dungarvan
Referee: Denis O'Leary

3 May 2009
Round 3

Ballyduff Upper	2–18 – 3–24	De La Salle
B. Hannon 1–9; P. Kearney 1–0; S. Kearney 0–2; S. Molumphy 0–2; S. Hannon 0–2; J. Kearney 0–1; B. Kearney 0–1; R Whelan 0–1	(Report)	J. Quirke 0–11; J. Mullane 1–5; D. McGrath 1–1; A. O'Neill 1–1; B. Phelan 0–3; P. Nevin 0–1; C. Watt 0–1; D. Twomey 0–1

Fraher Field, Dungarvan
Referee: Michael Wadding

3 May 2009
Round 3

Fourmilewater	1–11 – 0–15	Lismore
R. Fenton 0–8; T. O'Gorman 1–0; M. Walsh 0–1; S. Walsh 0–1; P. Horkan 0–1	(Report)	M. Shanahan 0–6; D. Bennett 0–4; S. O'Keeffe 0–2; P. Prendergast 0–1; J. Prendergast 0–1; D. Shanahan 0–1

Fraher Field, Dungarvan
Referee: Maurice Condon

==== Round 4 ====
22 August 2009
Round 4

Ballyduff Upper	5–18 – 0–10	Rinn Ó gCuanach
B. Hannon 3–10; S. Molumphy 1–0; R. Whelan 1–0; P. Kearney 0–2; J. Kearney 0–1; B. Kearney 0–1; S. Kearney 0–1; J. Barry 0–1; S. Cunningham 0–1; S. Hannon 0–1	(Report)	P. O Murchadha 0–7; S. O Cuirin 0–2; L. O Lionain 0–1

Cappoquin
Referee: Pat Casey

22 August 2009
Round 4

Lismore	2–13 – 3–16	Mount Sion
M. Shanahan 0–6; D. Shanahan 1–2; C. O'Gorman 1–0; D. Bennett 0–1; K. Power 0–1; P. Prendergast 0–1; D. Howard 0–1; J. Prendergast 0–1	(Report)	M. O'Neill 1–8; I. Galgey 1–2; A. Kirwan 1–1; K. McGrath 0–2; P. Hammond 0–1; R. O'Keeffe 0–1; K. Stafford 0–1

Fraher Field, Dungarvan
Referee: Tommy O'Sullivan

23 August 2009
Round 4

De La Salle	0–14 – 1–09	Fourmilewater
J. Quirke 0–9; J. Mullane 0–2; P. Nevin 0–1; D. Twomey 0–1; B. Phelan 0–1	(Report)	C. Guiry 1–2; A. Lawlor 0–2; Ml. O.Gorman 0–1; B. Wall 0–1; D. Wall 0–1; S. Walsh 0–1; S. Lawlor 0–1

Fraher Field, Dungarvan
Referee: Michael Wadding

==== Round 5 ====
29 August 2009
Round 5

De La Salle	2–14 – 1–18	Lismore
J. Mullane 2–4; J. Quirke 0–5; D. Twomey 0–2; K. Moran 0–1; D. McGrath 0–1; P. Nevin 0–1	(Report)	M. Shanahan 0–11; D. Shanahan 1–2; P. Prendergast 0–3; S. O'Keeffe 0–2

Fraher Field, Dungarvan
Referee: John Michael Kelly

29 August 2009
Round 5

Ballyduff Upper	0–17 – 1–15	Mount Sion
B. Hannon 0–7; M. Molumphy 0–4; A. Power 0–2; P. Kearney 0–2; J. Kearney 0–2	(Report)	M. O'Neill 1–4; R. O'Keeffe 0–3; S. Ryan 0–2; E. Whelan 0–2; K. McGrath 0–1; I. Galgey 0–1; E. McGrath 0–1; A. Kirwan 0–1

Cappoquin, County Waterford
Referee: P. Casey

29 August 2009
Round 5

Fourmilewater	1–15 – 1–04	Rinn Ó gCuanach
S. Walsh 1–2; R. Fenton 0–7; C. Guiry 0–4; S. Lawlor 0–2		D O Murchadha 1–0; P. O Murchadha 0–3; M. Tobin 0–1

Ardmore, County Waterford
Referee: Alan Kissane

== Group B ==
=== Standings ===
P	Team	Pld	W	D	L	PF	PA	PD	Pts
1	Ballygunner	5	4	1	0	112	79	+33	9
2	Abbeyside	5	3	2	0	113	89	+24	8
3	Tallow	5	3	1	1	103	85	+18	7
4	Ballyduff Lower	5	1	1	3	84	95	−11	3
5	Passage	5	1	0	4	91	127	−36	2
6	Stradbally	5	0	1	4	73	101	−28	1

Qualification
Qualified for quarter-finals
Entered for relegation playoff

=== Matches ===
==== Round 1 ====
26 April 2009
Round 1

Abbeyside	1–13 – 2–08	Strabally
M. Gorman 0–4; G. Hurney 1–0; M. Ferncombe 0–2; P. Hurney 0–2; R. Foley 0–2; L. Hurney 0–1; E. Enright 0–1; J. Gorman 0–1	(Report)	S. Aherne 0–6; S. Cunningham 2–0; J. Coffey 0–1; J. Ahearne 0–1

Fraher Field, Dungarvan
Referee: Maurice Condon

26 April 2009
Round 1

Ballyduff Lower	4–10 – 1–08	Passage
J. Kennedy 2–1; D. Clifford 1–1; N. Power 0–3; B. O'Leary 1–0; N. Clifford 0–2; P. Matthews 0–1; P. Fitzgerald 0–1; P. Murphy 0–1	(Report)	E. Kelly 2–6; C. Carey 0–1; K. Fitzgerald 0–1

Walsh Park, Waterford
Referee: Pat Casey

26 April 2009
Round 1

Ballygunner	2–23 – 2–12	Tallow
P. Flynn 0–8; B. O'Sullivan 2–1; T. Power 0–5; S. Walsh 0–2; S. O'Sullivan 0–2; G. O'Connor 0–2; W. Hutchinson 0–1; A. Kirwan 0–1; J.J. Hutchinson 0–1	(Report)	T. Ryan 1–4; P. O'Brien 0–4; P. Kearney 1–0; K. Geary 0–2; S.F. McCarthy 0–1

Fraher Field, Dungarvan
Referee: Michael Wadding

==== Round 2 ====
2 May 2009
Round 2

Ballyduff Lower	0–07 – 0–16	Tallow
J. Kennedy 0–3; N. Power 0–2; P. Fitzgerald 0–1	(Report)	P. O'Brien 0–10; L. McCarthy 0–3; P. Kearney 0–3

Fraher Field, Dungarvan
Referee: Maurice Condon

3 May 2009
Round 2

Ballygunner	4–12 – 0–11	Strabally
B. O'Sullivan 1–4; A. Kirwan 1–1; S. Walsh 1–1; T. Power 0–3; B. Mullane 1–0; S. Power 0–2; A. Maloney 0–1	(Report)	M. Walsh 0–6; S. Ahearne 0–4; C. Lawlor 1–0; N. Curran 0–1

Walsh Park, Waterford
Referee: Tommy Sullivan

3 May 2009
Round 2

Abbeyside	7–16 – 3–10	Passage
M. Ferncombe 2–2; J. Gorman 2–1; P. Hurney 2–1; L. Hurney 1–1; G. Hurney 0–3; M. Gorman 0–3; J. Hurney 0–2; R. Foley 0–2; S. O'Hare 0–1	(Report)	E. Kelly 1–8; C. Carey 2–0; T. Connors 0–1; K. Fitzgerald 0–1

Walsh Park, Waterford
Referee: John Condon

==== Round 3 ====
9 May 2009
Round 3

Passage	2–15 – 2–13	Stradbally
E. Kelly 1–5; E. Connors 0–5; C. Carey 1–1; A. Connors 0–2; T. Connors 0–1; N. Quinlan 0–1	(Report)	M. Walsh 1–10; R. Aherne 1–0; N. Curran 0–1; S. Cunningham 0–1; G. Power 0–1

Walsh Park, Waterford
Referee: Tim O'Byrne

9 May 2009
Round 3

Ballyduff Lower	1–13 – 2–16	Ballygunner
J. Kennedy 1–4; N. Power 0–5; N. Clifford 0–1; P. Fitzgerald 0–1; P. Murphy 0–1; P. Stevenson 0–1	(Report)	S. Power 2–2; B. O'Sullivan 0–5; T. Power 0–4; S. O'Sullivan 0–2; C. Kehoe 0–1; A. Kirwan 0–1; S. Walsh 0–1

Walsh Park, Waterford
Referee: Jim Murphy

9 May 2009
Round 3

Abbeyside	1–15 – 3–09	Tallow
M. Gorman 1–5; G. Hurney 0–3; S. O'Hare 0–2; J. Gorman 0–2; P. Hurney 0–2; R. Foley 0–1	(Report)	P. O'Brien 1–7; P. Kearney 1–0; S. Barry 1–0; T. Ryan 0–2

Cappoquin, County Waterford
Referee: Tommy Sullivan

==== Round 4 ====
20 August 2009
Round 4

Passage	1–19 – 5–13	Tallow
T. Ryan 4–1; P. O'Brien 1–2; A. Kearney 0–4; P. Kearney 0–2; E. Sheehan 0–1; K. Geary 0–1	(Report)	E. Kelly 0–13; T. Connors 1–0; A. Connors 0–3; B. FitzGerald 0–2; R. Quann 0–1

Fraher Field, Dungarvan
Referee: John Condon

23 August 2009
Round 4

Abbeyside	1–13 – 2–10	Ballygunner
M. Gorman 0–6; S. Enright 1–0; P. Hurney 0–3; R. Foley 0–1; M. Ferncombe 0–1; J. Gorman 0–1; L. Hurney 0–1	(Report)	S. Power 2–3; B. O'Sullivan 0–3; T. Power 0–1; C. Kehoe 0–1; B. Mullane 0–1; J.J. Hutchinson 0–1

Fraher Field, Dungarvan
Referee: Michael Wadding

23 August 2009
Round 4

Ballyduff Lower	1–14 – 1–14	Stradbally
P. Fitzgerald 1–6; J. Kennedy 0–2; D. Clifford 0–2; D. Van Veen 0–1; P. Mathews 0–1; P. Stevenson 0–1; C. Power 0–1	(Report)	S. Ahearne 1–10; A. Doyle 0–1; M. Walsh 0–1; N. Curran 0–1; R. Ahearne 0–1

Kill, County Waterford
Referee: John Michael Kelly

==== Round 5 ====
29 August 2009
Round 5

Abbeyside	2–20 – 1–19	Ballyduff Lower
M. Gorman 0–12; P. Hurney 2–1; M. Ferncombe 0–3; J. Gorman 0–2; J. Foley 0–2	(Report)	J. Kennedy 0–6; N. Power 0–4; P. Stevenson 1–1; P. Fitzgerald 0–3; P. Matthews 0–1; R. Barron 0–1; P. Murphy 0–1; B. O'Leary 0–1; J. O'Leary 0–1

Kilmacthomas, County Waterford
Referee: D. O Murchadha

29 August 2009
Round 5

Stradbally	0–09 – 4–11	Tallow

Ring, County Waterford

29 August 2009
Round 5

Ballygunner	0–21 – 1–12	Passage
B. O'Sullivan 0–6; S. Power 0–4; T. Power 0–4; C. Kehoe 0–3; G. O'Connor 0–2; S. O'Sullivan 0–1; P. Mahony 0–1	(Report)	E. Kelly 0–10; C. Carey 1–1; K. Fitzgerald 0–1

Kill, County Waterford

== Relegation playoff ==
TBA
Relegation playoff

Rinn Ó gCuanach	1–11 2–12	Stradbally
P. Ó Murchadha 0–7; L. Ó Lonáin 1–0; T. Ó hUallacháin 0–2; B. Breathnach 0–1; N. O Murchadha 0–1		S. Ahearne 2–5; M. Walsh 0–3; S. Cunningham 0–2; J. Hearne 0–1; N. Curran 0–1

Venue: Fraher Field
Referee: John Mike Kelly

== Knockout stages ==
Quarterfinals
Ballyduff Lower	1–08
Mount Sion	2–17
Ballygunner	(0–17) 1–19
De La Salle	(0–17) 1–16
Abbeyside	1–16
Lismore	2–15
Ballyduff Upper	0–19
Tallow	1–14

Semifinals
Mount Sion	0–14
Ballygunner	1–15
Lismore	1–22
Ballyduff Upper	2–12

Final
Ballygunner	(4–12) 1–17
Lismore	(2–18) 0–19
