= Conor Sheahan =

Irish hurler

Personal information
- Native name: Conchur Ó Síochán (Irish)
- Born: 1994 (age 31–32) Ballygunner, County Waterford, Ireland
- Occupation: Primary school teacher

Sport
- Sport: Hurling
- Position: Midfield
Club
- Years: Club
- 2011-present: Ballygunner
Club titles
- Waterford titles: 11
- Munster titles: 4
- All-Ireland Titles: 1
College
- Years: College
- Mary Immaculate College
College titles
- Fitzgibbon titles: 1
Inter-county
- Years: County
- 2020-present: Waterford
Inter-county titles
- Munster titles: 0
- All-Irelands: 0
- NHL: 0
- All Stars: 0

Conor Sheahan (born 1994) is an Irish hurler. At club level he plays with Ballygunner and at inter-county level with the Waterford senior hurling team.

== Career ==
Sheahan first played hurling to a high standard as a student at De La Salle College in Waterford. He later played with Mary Immaculate College and was part of their Fitzgibbon Cup-winning team in 2016, but didn't play in the final.

At club level, Sheahan first played for Ballygunner at juvenile and underage levels, winning Waterford MHC and U21HC medals. He eventually progressed to adult level and won his first Waterford SHC medal in 2014. It was the first of 11 successive Waterford SHC titles for Sheahan, including one as team captain in 2024. He has also won four Munster Club SHC titles and was at midfield for Ballygunner's defeat of Ballyhale Shamrocks in the 2022 All-Ireland club final.

Sheahan first played for Waterford as a member of the minor team in 2012. He didn't feature for the under-21 team but was a member of the senior team's extended panel when they were beaten by Limerick in the 2020 All-Ireland final. Sheahan made his debut in a National Hurling League game against Westmeath in May 2021.

== Personal life ==
His father, David Sheahan, played for the Wexford team beaten by Tipperary in the 1980 All-Ireland minor final.

== Honours ==
Mary Immaculate College

- Fitzgibbon Cup: 2016

Ballygunner

- All-Ireland Senior Club Hurling Championship: 2022
- Munster Senior Club Hurling Championship: 2018, 2021, 2022, 2023
- Waterford Senior Hurling Championship: 2014, 2015, 2016, 2017, 2018, 2019, 2020, 2021, 2022, 2023, 2024
- Waterford Under-21 Hurling Championship: 2012, 2014
- Waterford Minor Hurling Championship: 2010
