= Kevin Mahony =

Irish hurler

Personal information
- Native name: Caoimhín Ó Mathúna (Irish)
- Born: 2001 (age 24–25) Ballygunner, County Waterford, Ireland
- Occupation: Accountant

Sport
- Sport: Hurling
- Position: Left corner-forward
Club
- Years: Club
- 2019-present: Ballygunner
Club titles
- Waterford titles: 6
- Munster titles: 4
- All-Ireland Titles: 2
College
- Years: College
- University College Cork
College titles
- Fitzgibbon titles: 0
Inter-county
- Years: County
- 2023-present: Waterford
Inter-county titles
- Munster titles: 0
- All-Irelands: 0
- NHL: 0
- All Stars: 0

Kevin Mahony (born 2001) is an Irish hurler. At club level he plays with Ballygunner and at inter-county level with the Waterford senior hurling team.

== Career ==
Mahony first played hurling to a high standard as a student at De La Salle College in Waterford. He lined out in all grades, including the Dr Harty Cup. Mahony later played with University College Cork.

At club level, Sheahan first played for Ballygunner at juvenile and underage levels, winning back-to-back Waterford MHC titles in 2017 and 2018. He eventually progressed to adult level and, after a year with the intermediate team, he won his first Waterford SHC medal in 2020. It was the first of five successive Waterford SHC titles for Mahony. He has also won three Munster Club SHC titles and was at full-forward for Ballygunner's defeat of Ballyhale Shamrocks in the 2022 All-Ireland club final.

Mahony first played for Waterford as a member of the minor team in 2018. He later progressed to the under-20 team. Mahony made his senior team debut during the 2023 National Hurling League.

== Personal life ==
His uncles, Billy, Darragh and Shane O'Sullivan, as well as his brothers, Philip and Pauric Mahony, have also played with Ballygunner and the Waterford senior team.

== Honours ==
Ballygunner

- All-Ireland Senior Club Hurling Championship (2): 2022, 2026
- Munster Senior Club Hurling Championship (4): 2021, 2022, 2023, 2025
- Waterford Senior Hurling Championship (6): 2020, 2021, 2022, 2023, 2024, 2025
- Waterford Minor Hurling Championship (2): 2017, 2018
