= Paddy Leavey =

Irish hurler

Personal information
- Native name: Pádraig Mac Dhoinnéibhe (Irish)
- Born: 2001 (age 24–25) Ballygunner, County Waterford, Ireland
- Occupation: Student

Sport
- Sport: Hurling
- Position: Midfield
Club
- Years: Club
- Ballygunner
Club titles
- Waterford titles: 5
- Leinster titles: 3
- All-Ireland Titles: 1
College
- Years: College
- University College Dublin
College titles
- Fitzgibbon titles: 0
Inter-county
- Years: County
- 2023-present: Waterford
Inter-county titles
- Leinster titles: 0
- All-Irelands: 0
- NHL: 0
- All Stars: 0

Paddy Leavey (born 2001) is an Irish hurler. At club level he plays with Ballygunner, while he has also lined out at inter-county level with various Waterford teams.

== Career ==
Leavey played competitive hurling at De La Salle College, Waterford and lined out in several Dr Harty Cup campaigns. He later played with University College Dublin in the Fitzgibbon Cup.

At club level, Leavey first played for Ballygunner at juvenile and underage levels before progressing to adult level in 2019. Since then, he has won five consecutive Waterford SHC titles and three consecutive Munster Club SHC titles. Leavey was at midfield when Ballygunner beat Ballyhale Shamrocks in the 2022 All-Ireland club final.

Leavey first appeared at inter-county level with Waterford as a member of the minor team in 2018. He later spent two seasons with the under-20 team, including in the 2021 campaign. Leavey was drafted onto the senior team in advance of the pre-season Munster Senior Hurling League in 2023.

== Honours ==
Ballygunner

- All-Ireland Senior Club Hurling Championship: 2022
- Munster Senior Club Hurling Championship: 2021, 2022, 2023
- Waterford Senior Hurling Championship: 2019, 2020, 2021, 2022, 2023
