= Barry Coughlan =

Irish hurler

Personal information
- Native name: Barra Ó Cochláin (Irish)
- Born: 4 July 1990 (age 36) Ballygunner, County Waterford, Ireland
- Occupation: Accountant
- Height: 6 ft 4 in (193 cm)

Sport
- Sport: Hurling
- Position: Full-back
Club
- Years: Club
- Ballygunner
Club titles
- Waterford titles: 11
- Munster titles: 4
- All-Ireland Titles: 1
College
- Years: College
- University College Cork
College titles
- Fitzgibbon titles: 2
Inter-county
- Years: County
- 2014-2018: Waterford
Inter-county titles
- Munster titles: 0
- All-Irelands: 0
- NHL: 1
- All Stars: 0

Barry Coughlan (born 4 July 1990) is an Irish hurler who played as a full-back for the Waterford senior team.

== Honours ==
University College Cork

- Fitzgibbon Cup (2): 2012, 2013

Ballygunner

- All-Ireland Senior Club Hurling Championship (1): 2022
- Munster Senior Club Hurling Championship (4): 2018, 2021, 2022, 2023
- Waterford Senior Hurling Championship (11): 2011, 2014, 2015, 2016, 2017, 2018, 2019, 2020, 2021, 2022, 2023

Waterford

- National Hurling League (1): 2015

Munster

- Railway Cup (1): 2016
