= Ian Kenny (hurler) =

Irish hurler

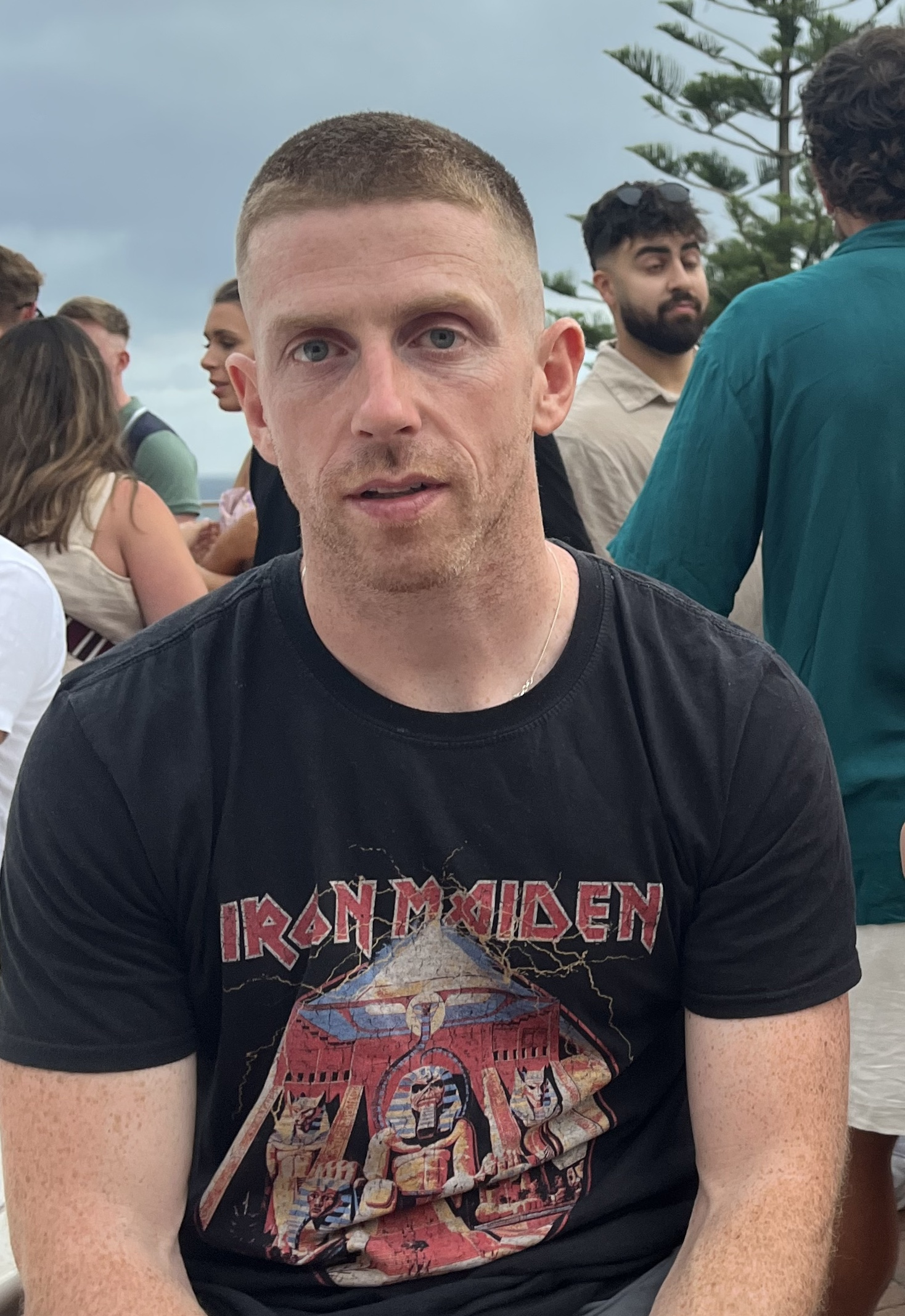

Personal information
- Native name: Iain Ó Cionnaith (Irish)
- Born: 30 March 1993 (age 33) Ballygunner, County Waterford, Ireland
- Occupation: Teacher
- Height: 5 ft 10 in (178 cm)

Sport
- Sport: Hurling
- Position: Right corner-back
Club
- Years: Club
- 2015-present: Ballygunner
Club titles
- Waterford titles: 11
- Munster titles: 5
- All-Ireland Titles: 2
College
- Years: College
- University College Cork
College titles
- Fitzgibbon titles: 0
Inter-county
- Years: County
- 2017-present: Waterford
Inter-county titles
- Munster titles: 0
- All-Irelands: 0
- NHL: 1
- All Stars: 0

Ian Kenny (born 30 March 1993) is an Irish hurler who plays for club Ballygunner and at inter-county level with the Waterford senior hurling team. He usually lines out as a right corner-back.

== Honours ==
=== Ballygunner ===
- All-Ireland Senior Club Hurling Championships (2): 2022, 2026
- Munster Senior Club Hurling Championship (5): 2018, 2021, 2022, 2023, 2025
- Waterford Senior Hurling Championship (11): 2015, 2016, 2017, 2018, 2019, 2020, 2021, 2022, 2023, 2024, 2025

=== Waterford ===
- National Hurling League (1): 2022
