= 2021–22 All-Ireland Senior Club Hurling Championship =

All-Ireland Senior Club Hurling Championship 2021–22
Championship Details
- Dates: 27 November 2021 – 12 February 2022
- Teams: 16

All Ireland Champions
- Winners: Ballygunner (1st win)
- Captain: Barry Coughlan
- Manager: Darragh O'Sullivan

All Ireland Runners-up
- Runners-up: Ballyhale Shamrocks
- Captain: Colin Fennelly
- Manager: James O'Connor

Provincial Champions
- Munster: Ballygunner
- Leinster: Ballyhale Shamrocks
- Ulster: Slaughtneil
- Connacht: Not Played

Championship Statistics
- Matches Played: 14
- Total Goals: 38 (2.71 per game)
- Total Points: 445 (31.78 per game)
- Top Scorer: T. J. Reid (2–31)

The 2021–22 All-Ireland Senior Club Hurling Championship was the 51st staging of the All-Ireland Senior Club Hurling Championship, the Gaelic Athletic Association's premier inter-county club hurling tournament. It was the first club championship to be held for two years as the 2020–21 edition was cancelled due to the impact of the COVID-19 pandemic on Gaelic games. The competition began on 27 November 2021 and concluded on 12 February 2022.

The defending champion was Ballyhale Shamrocks of Kilkenny.

The final was played at Croke Park in Dublin on 12 February 2022, between Ballygunner of Waterford and Ballyhale Shamrocks of Kilkenny, in what was a first ever meeting in a final. Ballygunner won the match by 2–17 to 1–19 to claim a first title.

T. J. Reid of Ballyhale was the competition's top scorer, finishing with 2–31.

== Format ==
County Championships

The top hurling teams in Ireland's counties compete in their senior club championship. Each county decides the format for determining their county champions – it can be knockout, double-elimination, league, etc or a combination.

Only single club teams are allowed to enter the All-Ireland Club championship. If a team which is an amalgamation of two or more clubs, a divisional team or a university team wins a county's championship, a single club team will represent that county in the provincial championship as determined by that county's championship rules. Normally it is the club team that exited the county championship at the highest stage.

Provincial Championships

Leinster, Munster and Ulster organise a provincial championship for their participating county champions. Connacht discontinued their senior club championship after 2007 but they do organise intermediate and junior championships. The Galway champions represent Connacht in the All-Ireland senior club semi-finals as Galway club hurling is at higher level than the hurling in the other four Connacht counties.

Some Leinster, Munster and Ulster counties enter their senior champions in the All-Ireland intermediate club championship (tier 2) as it is recognised that club hurling is weak in those counties.

All matches are knock-out. Two ten minute periods of extra time are played each way if it's a draw at the end of normal time in all matches including the final. If the score is still level after extra time the match is replayed.

All-Ireland

The Leinster, Munster and Ulster champions and the Galway county champions compete in two semi-finals. The All-Ireland Club SHC final took place at Croke Park on 13 February 2022. The decider was traditionally played at Croke Park on 17 March (St Patrick's Day). but this was discontinued for the 2019–20 edition of the competition.

All matches are knock-out. Two ten minute periods of extra time are played each way if it's a draw at the end of normal time in the semi-finals or final. If the score is still level after extra time the match is replayed.

== Team summaries ==
Team	County	Captain	Manager(s)	Most recent success			
Team	County	Captain	Manager(s)	All-Ireland	Provincial	County	#
Ballycran	Down	Liam Savage	Jamie Fowler; James Henry Hughes		1993	2019	
Ballyea	Clare	Jack Browne	Robbie Hogan		2016	2018	
Ballygunner	Waterford	Barry Coughlan	Darragh O'Sullivan		2018	2020	
Ballyhale Shamrocks	Kilkenny	Colin Fennelly	James O'Connor	2020	2019	2020	
Clough–Ballacolla	Laois	Stephen Maher	Declan Laffan			2020	
Cúchulains Dunloy	Antrim	Paul Shiels	Gregory O'Kane		2009	2020	
Kilmacud Crokes	Dublin	Caolan Conway	Kieran Dowling; Donal McGovern			2014	
Kilmallock	Limerick	Philip O'Loughlin	Tony Considine		2014	2014	
Loughmore–Castleiney	Tipperary	Noel McGrath	Frankie McGrath		2007	2013	
Midleton	Cork	Conor Lehane	Ger FitzGerald	1988	1987	2013	
Mount Leinster Rangers	Carlow	Michael Doyle	Conor Phelan		2013	2020	
Raharney	Westmeath	Seán Quinn	Brendan McKeogh			2016	
Rapparees	Wexford	Kevin Foley	Declan Ruth			1978	
Slaughtneil	Derry	Cormac O'Doherty	Michael McShane		2019	2020	
St Rynagh's	Offaly	Conor Clancy	Ken Hogan		1993	2020	
St Thomas'	Galway	Conor Cooney	Kenneth Burke	2013		2020	

== Leinster ==
=== Quarter-finals ===
27 November 2021 Quarter-final	Clough–Ballacolla (Laois)	1–17 – 0–12	Rapparees (Wexford)	MW Hire O'Moore Park
	S Maher 1–9 (0-7f, 0–1 ’65), W Dunphy 0–2, S Bergin 0–2, W Hyland 0–2, R Phelan 0–1, Cillian Dunne 0–1.	Report	R Mahon 0–7 (5f), O Pepper 0–2, J Kelly 0–1, J Pearce 0–1, K Foley 0–1.	Referee: P Murphy (Carlow)

28 November 2021 Quarter-final	Raharney (Westmeath)	0–15 – 5–19	Kilmacud Crokes (Dublin)	TEG Cusack Park
	K Doyle 0–10 (0–5 frees, 0–1 65), J Boyle, E Cunneen, E Ahearne, C Doyle, E Keyes 0–1 each.	Report	R Hayes 2–6 (0–5 frees), A Considine 2–1, D Purcell 0–5, C Conway 0–3, E Gibbons 1–0 (free), O O’Rorke, F Whiteley, L McMullan and M Howard 0–1 each.	Referee: S Cleere (Kilkenny)

4 December 2021 Quarter-final	Mount Leinster Rangers (Carlow)	0–16 – 0–22	Ballyhale Shamrocks (Kilkenny)	Dr Cullen Park
	D Murphy 0–12 (11f), R Coady, F Fitzpatrick, T Joyce, G Kelly 0–1 each.	Report	TJ Reid 0–6 (3f, 1 65), B Cody, J Cuddihy 0–4 each, A Mullen, E Cody 0–3 each, R Corcoran 0–1, E Shefflin 0–1,	Referee: R Fitzsimons (Offaly)

=== Semi-finals ===
11 December 2021 Semi-final	Clough–Ballacolla (Laois)	1–16 – 1–13	Kilmacud Crokes (Dublin)	O'Moore Park
18:15	S Maher 1–8 (0–6 f); S Bergin 0–3, J Walsh 0–2, B Corby, A Corby, W Dunphy 0–1.	Report	R Hayes O-5 (0–4 fs); O Rorke 1–1; F Whitely 0–3; C Conway 0–2; M Howard, C O Cathasaigh 0–1.	Referee: D Hughes (Carlow)

12 December 2021 Semi-final	St Rynagh's (Offaly)	2–18 – 3–24 (aet)	Ballyhale Shamrocks (Kilkenny)	O'Connor Park
	L O'Connor 1–8 (6f), R Hughes 1–2, P Quirke 0–4, A Treacy 0–3 (2f), S Quirke 0–1.	Report	E Cody 2–3, TJ Reid 0–6 (4f), C Fennelly 1–0, A Mullen 0–5, E Shefflin 0–2, R Corcoran 0–2, E Kenneally 0–1, B Cody 0–3, E Reid 0–1	Referee: C Mooney (Dublin)

=== Final ===
19 December 2021 Final	Clough–Ballacolla (Laois)	0–14 – 6–23	Ballyhale Shamrocks (Kilkenny)	Croke Park
	A Corby 0–4, W Dunphy and S Maher (0-3f) 0–3 each, B Corby, L Cleere, J Walshe and C Coonan 0–1 each.	Report	E Cody 1–6, C Fennelly 2–1, TJ Reid 0–6 (0-6f), A Mullen, B Cody and E Reid 1–1 each, R Corcoran 0–3, D Corcoran 0–2, E Kenneally, L Barron and P Mullen 0–1 each.	Referee: R Fitzsimons (Offaly)

== Munster ==
=== Quarter-final ===
28 November 2021 Quarter-final	Ballyea (Clare)	2–06 – 3–20	Ballygunner (Waterford)	Cusack Park
	N Deasy (1-05 4f 1’65), M O’Leary (1-00), P Lillis (0-01).	Report	Pauric Mahony (0-08 4f 3’65), B O’Keeffe (2-01), M Mahony (1-02), C Sheahan (0-03), C Power (0-02), P Leavey (0-01), S O’Sullivan (0-01), K Mahony (0-01), H Ruddle (0-01 1’65).	Referee: J O'Halloran (Limerick)

=== Semi-finals ===
12 December 2021 Semi-final	Kilmallock (Limerick)	0–19 – 1–09	Midleton (Cork)	Gaelic Grounds
	M Houlihan 0–11 (0-7f), O O’Reilly 0–2, B Hennessy (0-1f), P O’Brien, R Hanley, G Mulcahy, K O’Donnell, C Stanton 0–1 each.	Report	C Lehane 0–6 (0-2f), T O’Connell 1–0, C Beausang, S Meara, P O’Keeffe 0–1 each.	Referee: M Kennedy (Tipperary)

12 December 2021 Semi-final	Ballygunner (Waterford)	2–11 – 0–12	Loughmore–Castleiney (Tipperary)	Fraher Field
	D Hutchinson 0–5, K Mahony 1–1, M Mahony 1–0, P Hogan, P Mahony (0-2f) 0–2 each, B O’Keeffe 0–1.	Report	J McGrath 0–7 (0-7f), C Connolly 0–3, E Connolly, T Maher 0–1 each.

=== Final ===
9 January 2022 Final	Kilmallock (Limerick)	1–12 – 3–20	Ballygunner (Waterford)	Páirc Uí Chaoimh
	C Hanley (1–1, 1–0 free); G Mulcahy (0–3, 2 frees); R Hanley (0–2); K O’Donnell, M Houlihan, O O’Reilly, P O’Reilly, C O’Connor, K Hayes (0–1 each).	Report	D Hutchinson (1–5); Pauric Mahony (0–7, 4 frees, 1 65); B O’Keeffe (1–3); K Mahony (1–0); P Hogan, P Leavy (0–2 each); M Mahony (0–1).	Referee: C Lyons (Cork)

== Ulster ==
=== Semi-final ===
12 December 2021 Semi-final	Cúchulains Dunloy (Antrim)	0–14 – 1–18	Slaughtneil (Derry)	Athletic Grounds
	C Cunning (0–6, 5f, 0–1 ‘65’); P Shiels, E O’Neill (0–2 each); Keelan Molloy, Kevin Molloy, D Smyth, S Elliott (0–1 each).		C O’Doherty (0–7, 7f); B Rodgers (1–4); M McGrath (0–3); Shane McGuigan, C McKaigue, B Cassidy, J Cassidy (0–1 each).

=== Final ===
19 December 2021 Final	Ballycran (Down)	0–10 – 1–14	Slaughtneil (Derry)	Corrigan Park
	P Savage (0-05, 0-05f); C Woods (0-02, 0-02f), M Hughes (0-01), S Martin (0-01, 0–01 sideline), B Arthurs (0-01).	Report	C O'Doherty (0-07, 0-06f), B Rodgers (1-01), J McGuigan (0-02), C McKaigue (0-01); S McGuigan (0-01), S McGuigan (0-01), J Cassidy (0-01).	Referee: C McDonald (Donegal)

== Semi-finals ==
23 January 2022 Semi-final	Slaughtneil (Derry)	1–17 – 2–19	Ballygunner (Waterford)	Parnell Park
1:30 pm	C O’Doherty 0–7 (0–6 frees), B Rogers 0–4, S McGuigan 1–1, B Cassidy 0–3, J McGuigan 0–2.	Report	B O’Keeffe2-3 ()-1 free), D Hutchinson and K Mahony 0–4 each, P Hogan 0–3, C Sheahan 0–2, Pauric Mahony 0–2 frees, M Mahony 0–1.	Referee: S Stack (Dublin)

23 January 2022 Semi-final	St Thomas' (Galway)	0–20 – 2–15	Ballyhale Shamrocks (Kilkenny)	Semple Stadium
3:30 pm	C Cooney 0–11 (0-10fs, 0-1sl) E Burke 0–4 B Burke 0–2, Darragh Burke, J Regan B Farrell 0–1 each.	Report	TJ Reid 2–5 (1-3fs, 1–0 pen) E Cody 0–4, J Cuddihy 0–3, C Fennelly A Mullen, P Mullen 0–1 each.	Referee: R McGann (Clare)

== Final ==
12 February 2022 Final	Ballygunner (Waterford)	2–17 – 1–19	Ballyhale Shamrocks (Kilkenny)	Croke Park
	Pauric Mahony 0–7 (7 fs), D Hutchinson 1–3; H Ruddle 1–0; M Mahony 0–3; B O’Keeffe, K Mahony 0–2 each.	Report	TJ Reid 0–8 (4 fs, 65); E Reid 1–0; A Mullen, E Shefflin 0–2 each; E Cody, P Mullen, J Cuddihy, D Corcoran, B Cody, C Fennelly, R Reid 0–1 each.	Referee: J Owens (Wexford)

== Statistics ==
=== Top scorers ===
Overall

Rank	Player	Club	Tally	Total	Matches	Average
1	T. J. Reid	Ballyhale Shamrocks	2–31	37	5	7.40
2	Eoin Cody	Ballyhale Shamrocks	3–17	26	5	5.20
2	Stephen Maher	Clough–Ballacolla	2–20	26	3	8.66
2	Pauric Mahony	Ballygunner	0–26	26	5	5.20
5	Billy O'Keeffe	Ballygunner	5–10	25	5	5.00
6	Dessie Hutchinson	Ballygunner	2–17	23	5	4.60
7	Cormac O'Doherty	Slaughtneil	0–21	21	3	7.00
8	Ronan Hayes	Kilmacud Crokes	2–11	17	2	8.50
9	Brendan Rogers	Slaughtneil	2-09	15	3	5.00
9	Adrian Mullen	Ballyhale Shamrocks	1–12	15	5	3.00

In a single game

Rank	Player	Club	Tally	Total	Opposition
1	Ronan Hayes	Kilmacud Crokes	2-06	12	Raharney
1	Stephen Maher	Clough–Ballacolla	1-09	12	Rapparees Starlights
1	Denis Murphy	Mount Leinster Rangers	0–12	12	Ballyhale Shamrocks
4	T. J. Reid	Ballyhale Shamrocks	2-05	11	St Thomas'
4	Stephen Maher	Clough/Ballacolla	1-08	11	Kilmacud Crokes
4	Luke O'Connor	St Rynagh's	1-08	11	Ballyhale Shamrocks
4	Conor Cooney	St Thomas'	0–11	11	Ballyhale Shamrocks
4	Micheál Houlihan	Kilmallock	0–11	11	Midleton
9	Killian Doyle	Raharney	0–10	10	Kilmacud Crokes
10	Eoin Cody	Ballyhale Shamrocks	2-03	9	St Rynagh's
10	Billy O'Keeffe	Ballygunner	2-03	9	Slaughtneil
10	Eoin Cody	Ballyhale Shamrocks	1-06	9	Clough–Ballacolla

=== Miscellaneous ===
- Clough–Ballacolla qualified for the Leinster semi-finals and final for the first time.
- Ballygunner became the first team from Waterford to win the title.

== Awards ==
Team of the Year

1. Stephen O'Keeffe
2. Ian Kenny
3. Joey Holden
4. Fintan Burke
5. Philip Mahony
6. Richie Reid
7. Darragh Corcoran
8. Cormac O'Doherty
9. Paddy Leavey
10. Mikey Mahony
11. T. J. Reid
12. Billy O'Keeffe
13. Dessie Hutchinson
14. Brendan Rogers
15. Eoin Cody

Hurler of the Year

- PLAYER NAME (Club)

Also nominated: PLAYER NAME (Club) & PLAYER NAME (Club)
