= 2023–24 All-Ireland Senior Club Hurling Championship =

All-Ireland Senior Club Hurling Championship 2023–24
Championship Details
- Dates: 5 November 2023 – 21 January 2024
- Teams: 17

All Ireland Champions
- Winners: St Thomas' (2nd win)
- Captain: Conor Cooney
- Manager: Kenneth Burke

All Ireland Runners-up
- Runners-up: O'Loughlin Gaels
- Captain: Mark Bergin
- Manager: Brian Hogan

Provincial Champions
- Munster: Ballygunner
- Leinster: O'Loughlin Gaels
- Ulster: Ruairí Óg
- Connacht: Not Played

Championship Statistics
- Matches Played: 16
- Total Goals: 31 (1.93 per game)
- Total Points: 567 (35.43 per game)
- Top Scorer: Mark Bergin (0–39)

The 2023–24 All-Ireland Senior Club Hurling Championship was the 53rd staging of the All-Ireland Senior Club Hurling Championship, the Gaelic Athletic Association's premier inter-county club hurling tournament. The draws for the respective provincial championships took place at various stages. The competition ran from 5 November 2023 until 21 January 2024.

The defending champion was Ballyhale Shamrocks; however, the club did not qualify after losing to O'Loughlin Gaels in the Kilkenny SHC. Dublin's Na Fianna qualified for the Leinster Club SHC for the first time.

The final was played at Croke Park in Dublin on 21 January 2024, between St Thomas' of Galway and O'Loughlin Gaels of Kilkenny, in what was a first championship meeting. St Thomas' won the match by 0–18 to 0–17 to claim a second title, as well as a first title in 10 years.

Mark Bergin was the competition's top scorer, finishing with 0–39.

== Team summaries ==
Team	County	Captain(s)	Manager	Most recent success		
Team	County	Captain(s)	Manager	All-Ireland	Provincial	County
Ballygunner	Waterford	Stephen O'Keeffe	Darragh O'Sullivan	2022	2022	2022
Camross	Laois	Darragh Duggan	David Cuddy		1996	2018
Clonlara	Clare	Jathan McMahon	Donal Madden			2008
Kiladangan	Tipperary	Alan Flynn	John O'Meara			2020
Kilcormac–Killoughey	Offaly	Conor Slevin	Shane Hand		2012	2017
Mount Leinster Rangers	Carlow	Diarmuid Byrne	Paul O'Brien		2013	2020
Na Fianna	Dublin	Donal Burke; Seán Baxter	Niall Ó Ceallacháin			
Na Piarsaigh	Limerick	Mike Casey	Shane O'Neill	2016	2017	2022
Naas	Kildare	Brian Byrne	Tom Mullally			2022
Naomh Éanna	Wexford	Conor McDonald	James Quirke			2018
O'Loughlin Gaels	Kilkenny	Mark Bergin	Brian Hogan		2010	2016
Portaferry	Down	Matthew Conlan (Hurler)	Gerard McGrattan		2014	2022
Raharney	Westmeath	Robbie Greville	Ger Flanagan			2021
Ruairí Óg	Antrim	Ryan McCambridge; Neil McManus	Brian Delargy		2018	2018
Sarsfields	Cork	Conor O'Sullivan	John Crowley			2014
Slaughtneil	Derry	Brendan Rogers	Michael McShane		2021	2022
St Thomas'	Galway	Conor Cooney	Kenneth Burke	2013	—	2022

== Leinster ==
=== Quarter-finals ===
12 November 2023 Quarter-final	Camross (Laois)	1–17 – 2–17	Naas (Kildare)	Laois Hire O'Moore Park
	Z Kenan 1–13 (9 frees, s/l), T Keyes 0–3, L Delaney 0–1.	Report	J Sheridan 1–10 (8 frees, 65), C Boran 0–4, B Byrne 1–1, S Leacy 0–1, K Aherne 0–1.

12 November 2023 Quarter-final	Naomh Éanna (Wexford)	0–14 – 2–22	Kilcormac–Killoughey (Offaly)	Chadwicks Wexford Park
	J Cullen (0–4, 0–2 frees, 0–2, 65s), C Dunbar (0–3), J Doran (0–2), P Doyle (0–2 frees), C McGuckin (0–1), A Doyle (0–1), C McDonald (0–1)	Report	A Screeney (1–7, 0–6 frees), J Gorman (1–3), C Kiely (0–3, 0–2 frees), C Spain (0–2), C Mitchell (0–2), E Grogan (0–1), J Screeney (0–1), C Mahon (0–1), Lochlann Kavanagh (0–1).

12 November 2023 Quarter-final	Raharney (Westmeath)	0–19 – 1–24	Na Fianna (Dublin)	Cusack Park
	K Doyle 0–12 (nine frees, one ‘65’), E Ahearn 0–4, C Boyle, E Cunneen (lineball), C Boyle 0–1 each.	Report	C Currie 0–9 (nine frees), B Ryan 1–3, AJ Murphy, S Currie (one lineball) 0–4 each, J Tierney 0–2, P Feeney, C Stacey 0–1 each.

12 November 2023 Quarter-final	Mount Leinster Rangers (Carlow)	0–13 – 2–16	O'Loughlin Gaels (Kilkenny)	Dr Cullen Park
	C Nolan (0–9, 6f, 1 65), J Nolan (0–3), D Tobin (0–1).	Report	M Bergin (0–8, 4 frees, 1 65); O Wall, L Hogan (1–0), J Nolan (0–3), C Heary (0–2), P Butler, M Butler, C Loy (0–1).

=== Semi-finals ===
25 November 2023 Semi-final	Kilcormac–Killoughey (Offaly)	0–12 – 0–17	O'Loughlin Gaels (Kilkenny)	Glenisk O'Connor Park
	A Screeney 0-5f, C Mitchell 0–3, Cillian Kiely 0–2 (0–1 65, 0-1f), J Gorman 0–1, J Screeney 0–1.	Report	M Bergin 0–7 (0-6f), S Bolger 0–2, O Wall 0–2, E O’Shea 0–1, P Butler 0–1, C Loy 0–1, D Fogarty 0–1, J Molloy 0–1, C Heary 0–1.

25 November 2023 Semi-final	Naas (Kildare)	0–17 – 2–14	Na Fianna (Dublin)	Manguard Park
	J Sheridan 0–8 (6 frees, two 65s), S Leacy 0–3, B Byrne 0–2, C Boran 0–1, K Whelan 0–1, K Aherne 0–1, C Dowling 0–1.	Report	C Currie 0–8 (7 frees), C Stacey 1–1, AJ Murphy 1–0, S Currie 0–2, B Ryan 0–1, S Barrett 0–1, T Brennan 0–1.

=== Final ===
2 December 2023 Final	O'Loughlin Gaels (Kilkenny)	0–22 – 1–18	Na Fianna (Dublin)	Croke Park
16:05 IWT	M Bergin (0–11, 0-0f), P Deegan (0–5), D Fogarty (0–2), J Nolan (0–1), C Loy (0–1); C Heary (0–1), L Hogan (0–1).	Report	C Currie (0–11, 0-0f), S Currie (1–1); B Ryan (0–3), AJ Murphy (0–2), J Tierney (0–1).	Referee: C Flynn (Westmeath)

== Munster ==
=== Quarter-final ===
5 November 2023 Quarter-final	Ballygunner (Waterford)	2–20 – 0–09	Sarsfields (Cork)	Walsh Park
	Pauric Mahony (0–7, 0–6 frees); P Fitzgerald (0–5); D Hutchinson (0–4); K Mahony (1–1); P Hogan (1–0); C Sheahan, M Mahony, B O’Keeffe (0–1 each).	Report	A Myers (0–6, 0–3 frees, 0–1 ‘65); Cathal McCarthy, D Hogan, C Darcy (0–1 each).	Referee: C Doyle (Tipperary)

=== Semi-finals ===
19 November 2023 Semi-final	Kiladangan (Tipperary)	1–19 – 0–23	Clonlara (Clare)	FBD Semple Stadium
14:00 IWT (UTC±0)	B Seymour (0–11, 0–7 frees); D O’Meara (1–0); D McGrath (0–3); T Gallagher, A Flynn, P Flynn, B McLoughney, S Hayes (0–1 each).	Report	M O’Loughlin (0–9, 0–7 frees, 0–1 ‘65); J Conlon (0–4); C O’Meara, C Moriarty (0–2 each); M Clancy, P O’Loughlin, A Moriarty, C Galvin, I Galvin, D Stritch (0–1 each).	Referee: C O'Regan (Cork)

19 November 2023 Semi-final	Na Piarsaigh (Limerick)	1–09 – 0–16	Ballygunner (Waterford)	TUS Gaelic Grounds
16:00 IWT (UTC±0)	R Lynch 0–7 (7fs), A Breen 1–1, W Henn 0–1.	Report	Pauric Mahony 0–11 (6fs, 2 65), D Hutchinson, R Power 0–2 each, H Ruddle 0–1.	Referee: M Kennedy (Tipperary)

=== Final ===
3 December 2023 Final	Ballygunner (Waterford)	2–24 – 0–17	Clonlara (Clare)	FBD Semple Stadium
15:30 IWT	Pauric Mahony (0–10, 5 frees, 2 65s); K Mahony (1–4); D Hutchinson (1–1); P Hogan (0–4); P Fitzgerald (0–2): M Mahony, C Sheahan, H Ruddle (0–1 each).	Report	M O'Loughlin 0–5 (3fs, 1 65), D Stritch 0–3, J Conlon, P O'Loughlin 0–2 each, I Galvin D McMahon, A Moriarty, M Stritch all 0–1 each	Referee: C O’Regan (Cork)

== Ulster ==
=== Semi-final ===
19 November 2023 Semi-final	Ruairí Óg, Cushendall (Antrim)	4–28 – 3–19 (aet)	Portaferry (Down)	BOX-IT Athletic Grounds
	N McManus 1–14 (1-6fs, 0–1 65), J McLaughlin 2–5, A Delargy 1–0, F McCambridge 0–2, E McQuillan 0–2, P Burke 0–1, S Walsh 0–1, E Campbell 0–1, F McCurry 0–1, R McAteer 0–1	Report	N Milligan 2–0, E Sands 1–2, T McGrattan 0–5 (0-4fs), D Sands 0–4, P Doran 0–3 (0-3fs), F Turpin 0–2 C Taggart 0–1, M Conlan 0–1, N Fitzsimmons 0–1	Referee: Tarlach Conway (Derry)

=== Final ===
3 December 2023 Final	Slaughtneil (Derry)	2–10 – 0–20	Ruairí Óg, Cushendall (Antrim)	Páirc Esler
14:30 GMT	C O’Doherty 0-4f, Shea Cassidy, E Cassidy 1–0 each, Shane McGuigan 0–2, Sé McGuigan, B Rogers, P McCullagh and M McGuigan 0–1 each	Report	N McManus 0–8 (36, 1 65), E McQuillan 0–4, J McLaughlin 0–3, R McAteer 0–2, E Campbell, F McCambridge and S Walsh 0–1 each	Attendance: 3,462; Referee: J Clarke (Down)

== Bracket ==
Semi-finals		Final
St Thomas' (Galway)	1–23 (aet, 4pen)
Ballygunner (Waterford)	2–20 (aet, 2pen)	St Thomas' (Galway)	0–18
O'Loughlin Gaels (Kilkenny)	1–17	O'Loughlin Gaels (Kilkenny)	0–17
Ruairí Óg, Cushendall (Antrim)	1–16

== Semi-finals ==
16 December 2023 Semi-final	Ballygunner (Waterford)	2–20 – 1–23 (a.e.t.) (2–4 p)	St Thomas' (Galway)	Laois Hire O'Moore Park
19:30 IWT (UTC±0)	Pauric Mahony (0–7, 0–6 frees); P Fitzgerald, D Hutchinson (1–4 each); S O’Keeffe, C Sheahan, P Leavey, P Hogan, B O’Keeffe (0–1 each)	Report	C Cooney (0–14, 0–13 frees); J Regan (1–1); É Burke (0–3); G Kelly (0–1 free), E Duggan, Darragh Burke, O Flannery, David Burke (0–1 each)	Referee: J Murphy (Limerick)
	Penalties
	Pauric Mahony; Dessie Hutchinson ✗; Stephen O'Keeffe; Billy O'Keeffe ✗		Conor Cooney; Darragh Burke; ✗ Fintan Burke; Éanna Burke; Evan Duggan

17 December 2023 Semi-final	O'Loughlin Gaels (Kilkenny)	1–17 – 1–16	Ruairí Óg, Cushendall (Antrim)	Páirc Tailteann
13:30 IWT (UTC±0)	M Bergin (0–9, 0-5f), S Bolger (1–1), D Fogarty (0–2), C Heary (0–2), P Deegan (0–1), J Nolan (0–1), E O’Shea (0–1)	Report	N McManus (0–9, 0-7f), J McLaughlin (1–1), E Campbell (0–2), R McCambridge (0–1); E McQuillan (0–1), R McAteer (0–1), P Burke (0–1)	Referee: M Kennedy (Tipperary)

== Final ==
21 January 2024 Final	St Thomas' (Galway)	0–18 – 0–17	O'Loughlin Gaels (Kilkenny)	Croke Park
	C Cooney 0–6 (4fs), D Burke, E Burke 0–3 each, J Regan, V Manso 0–2 each, C Burke, G Kelly (f) 0–1 each.	Report	M Bergin 0–4 (2fs), P Deegan, S Bolger, D Fogarty, J Molloy all 0–2 each, M Butler, S Murphy (f), C Kelly, L Hogan, C Heary all 0–1 each	Referee: S Stack (Dublin)

== Statistics ==
=== Top scorers ===
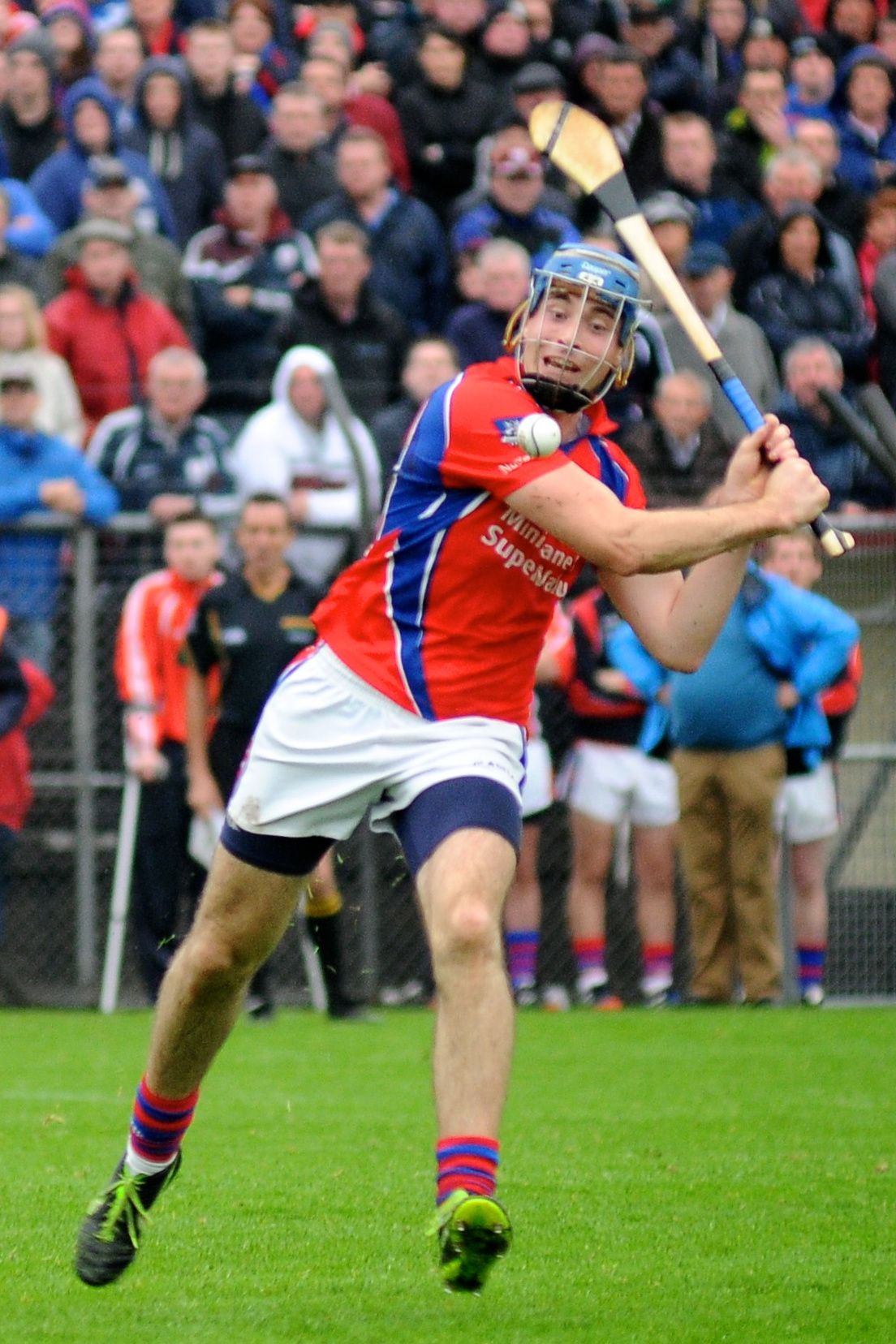
Conor Cooney was the St Thomas' captain and top scorer.

Overall

Rank	Player	Club	Tally	Total	Matches	Average
1	Mark Bergin	O'Loughlin Gaels	0–39	39	5	7.80
2	Pauric Mahony	Ballygunner	0–35	35	4	8.75
3	Neil McManus	Ruairí Óg	1–31	34	3	11.33
4	Colin Currie	Na Fianna	0–28	28	3	9.33
5	Jack Sheridan	Naas	1–18	21	2	10.50
6	Conor Cooney	St Thomas'	0–20	20	2	10.00
7	Joseph McLaughlin	Ruairí Óg	3-09	18	3	6.00
8	Dessie Hutchinson	Ballygunner	2–11	17	4	4.25
9	Zane Keenan	Camross	1–13	16	1	16.00
10	Adam Screeney	Kilcormac–Killoughey	1–12	15	2	7.50

In a single game

Rank	Player	Club	Tally	Total	Opposition
1	Neil McManus	Ruairí Óg	1–14	17	Portaferry
2	Zane Keenan	Camross	1–13	16	Naas
3	Conor Cooney	St Thomas'	0–14	14	Ballygunner
4	Jack Sheridan	Naas	1–10	13	Camross
5	Killian Doyle	Raharney	0–12	12	Na Fianna
6	Joseph McLaughlin	Ruairí Óg	2-05	11	Portaferry
6	Mark Bergin	O'Loughlin Gaels	0–11	11	Na Fianna
6	Colin Currie	Na Fianna	0–11	11	O'Loughlin Gaels
6	Pauric Mahony	Ballygunner	0–11	11	Na Piarsaigh
6	Billy Seymour	Kiladangan	0–11	11	Clonlara

=== Miscellaneous ===
- Clonlara qualified for the Munster Club SHC final for the first time.
- Na Fianna qualified for the Leinster Club SHC for the first time, reaching the Leinster Club SHC final.
- Ballygunner became the first team to win three successive Munster Club SHC titles.

== Awards ==
Team of the Year

1. Gerald Kelly
2. Paddy Burke
3. Fintan Burke
4. Huw Lawlor
5. David Fogarty
6. Paddy Deegan
7. Shane Cooney
8. David Burke
9. Paddy Leavey
10. Mark Bergin
11. Conor Cooney
12. Peter Hogan
13. Dessie Hutchinson
14. Éanna Burke
15. Neil McManus

Hurler of the Year

- PLAYER NAME (Club)

Also nominated: PLAYER NAME (Club) & PLAYER NAME (Club)
