= Ballygunner Castle =

Country house near Waterford city, Ireland

Coordinates: 52.2280°N 7.0565°W

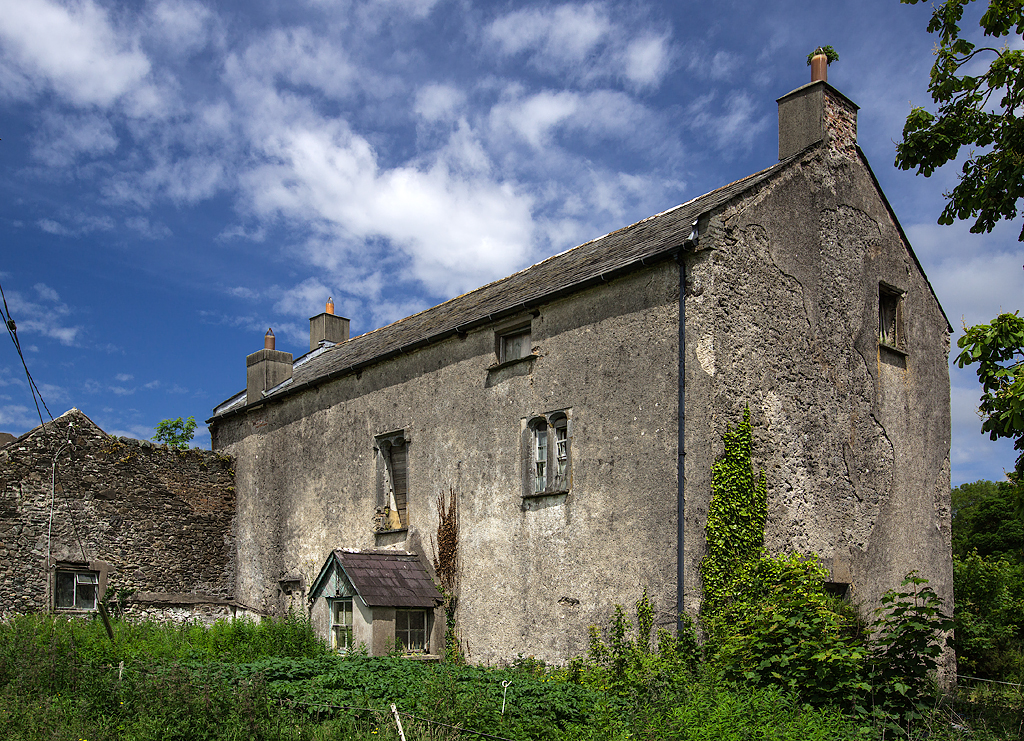
Ballygunner Castle, near Knockboy, County Waterford

Ballygunner Castle is a country house in the Ballygunner area of County Waterford in Ireland. It is believed to be built on the site of a former Viking stronghold. The main structure of the house includes a combination of medieval and 17th century building, with evidence of further modifications in the 18th and 19th centuries.

The house has historically been associated with the Fitzgerald/Purcell Fitzgerald family (of Little Island Castle) who were landowners in the area into the 19th century.
