= Dessie Hutchinson =

Irish hurler and footballer

Personal information
- Date of birth: 5 December 1996 (age 29)
- Place of birth: Waterford, Ireland

Youth career
- Waterford Bohemians
- 2015–2017: Brighton & Hove Albion

Senior career*
Years	Team	Apps	(Gls)
2017–2018	Brighton & Hove Albion	0	(0)
2018	Waterford	10	(4)

International career
2014–2015	Republic of Ireland U19	4	(1)
- * Club domestic league appearances and goals

Dessie Hutchinson (born 5 December 1996) is an Irish hurler and former professional footballer. He last played professional football as a midfielder or full-back for Waterford of the League of Ireland Premier Division. In 2020 he joined the Waterford county hurling team and was part of the team that reached the 2020 All-Ireland SHC Final.

Hutchinson was born in Dunmore East, County Waterford and played youth football with Waterford Bohemians and Brighton & Hove Albion, where he made his senior debut in the EFL Cup. In 2018 he joined hometown club Waterford, who play in the League of Ireland.

He is currently employed in St.Pauls community college in County Waterford

== Early life ==
Hutchinson was born in Ballygunner. He played both football and hurling as to a good level but decided to focus on football. He played his youth football in Ireland with Bohemians Waterford and was selected for the Waterford & District Junior League team which reached the final of 2012–13 FAI Youth-Inter League Cup. He was a hurler for his hometown club Ballygunner.

== Association football career ==
=== Club career ===
Following his move to Brighton, Hutchinson became an important member of the dressing room, sharing the under-23 captaincy for the 2016–17 season. During this season the side qualified for the knockout stages of the EFL Trophy. Hutchinson scored in the semi-final of the Sussex Senior Challenge Cup, a 4–3 victory over Eastbourne Borough. He captained them to victory in the competition, seeing off Crawley Town in the final 3–0 after extra time. Hutchinson made his first team debut on 19 September 2017, playing 120 minutes of an EFL Cup game against Bournemouth, alongside fellow Irishman Jayson Molumby.

After leaving Brighton, Hutchinson signed for his hometown club Waterford who play in the League of Ireland Premier Division. He chose to sign for Waterford despite other offers from English clubs.

=== International career ===
Hutchinson made his Republic of Ireland under-19 debut against Sweden in October 2014. He scored his only goal at this level against Azerbaijan in a 6–0 victory on 25 February 2015. Hutchinson was called in to the next Irish under-21 squad meet-up in May 2017 but was not included in the next squad.

== Hurling career ==
Dessie Hutchinson
Personal information
- Native name: Deasúnaigh Ó Úistín (Irish)

Sport
- Sport: Hurling

Hutchinson scored 4–27 for the Ballygunner club in the 2019 Waterford Senior Hurling Championship and 6–23 in the 2020 Waterford Senior Hurling Championship.

Hutchinson made his inter-county debut for Waterford in 2020. Waterford qualified for the 2020 All-Ireland Senior Hurling Championship Final in his debut season. Ahead of the final (with 2–8), Hutchinson was the competition's leading scorer from play. He was behind the Limerick and Waterford free takers, Aaron Gillane (2–34) and Stephen Bennett (1–44), ahead of the competition's concluding game.

== Association football career statistics ==
=== Club ===
As of match played 19 September 2017

Appearances and goals by club, season and competition
Club	Season	League			FA Cup		EFL Cup		Other		Total	
Club	Season	Division	Apps	Goals	Apps	Goals	Apps	Goals	Apps	Goals	Apps	Goals
Brighton & Hove Albion	2016–17	Championship	0	0	0	0	0	0	5 (Note: Appearances for youth team in EFL Trophy)	0	5	0
Brighton & Hove Albion	2017–18	Premier League	0	0	0	0	1	0	1	0	2	0
Brighton & Hove Albion	Total		0	0	0	0	1	0	6	0	7	0
Career total			0	0	0	0	1	0	6	0	7	0

== Honours ==
=== Association football ===
Brighton & Hove Albion

- Sussex Senior Challenge Cup: 2016–17

=== Hurling ===
Ballygunner

- Waterford Senior Hurling Championship: 2019, 2020, 2021, 2022, 2023, 2024, 2025
- Munster Senior Club Hurling Championship: 2021, 2022, 2023, 2025
- All Ireland Senior Club Hurling Championship: 2022, 2026
