= James O'Connor (hurler) =

Irish hurler and hurling manager

Personal information
- Native name: Séamus Ó Conchúir (Irish)
- Nickname: Joxer
- Born: 26 August 1975 (age 51) Lismore, County Waterford, Ireland
- Height: 5 ft 11 in (180 cm)

Sport
- Sport: Hurling
- Position: Left corner-back
Club
- Years: Club
- 1993-2013: Lismore
Club titles
- Waterford titles: 1
Inter-county
- Years: County
- 1996-2002: Waterford
Inter-county titles
- Munster titles: 1
- All-Irelands: 0
- NHL: 0
- All Stars: 0

James O'Connor (born 26 August 1975) is an Irish hurling manager and former player who is the current manager of the Waterford Under 20 hurling team. He played for club side Lismore and at inter-county level with the Waterford senior hurling team.

== Playing career ==
O'Connor played hurling while in secondary school at Lismore CBS. He also had a number of juvenile and underage successes with Lismore GAA club, beginning with a Waterford MHC title in 1990 before claiming back-to-back Waterford U21HC titles in 1992 and 1993. O'Connor had just progressed to adult level when he won a Waterford SHC medal in 1993 after Lismore's one-point defeat of Passage in the final. He also won a Waterford IFC medal with the Lismore Gaelic footballers in 2000. O'Connor brought his 20-year club career to an end in 2013, having spent the last few years lining out at junior level.

O'Connor's inter-county career with Waterford began at minor level. He was part of the Waterford team beaten by Galway in the 1992 All-Ireland minor final. O'Connor progressed to the under-21 team and captained the team to the Munster U21HC title in 1994. A period with the junior team was followed by a call-up to the senior team in 1996. O'Connor was a substitute when Waterford beat Tipperary by 2–23 to 3–12 in the 2002 Munster final.

== Coaching career ==
O'Connor's first success in management came in 2011 when he guided Carrigtwohill to their first Cork SHC title in 93 years. He later spent three seasons as manager of Dungarvan before returning to Cork to take charge of the Fr O'Neill's club. Under O'Connor, the club claimed Cork PIHC and Munster Club IHC titles in 2019, before losing the 2020 All-Ireland intermediate club final to Tullaroan.

O'Connor succeeded Henry Shefflin as Ballyhale Shamrocks manager in 2020. During his two-year tenure he managed the team to back-to-back Kilkenny SHC titles and one Leinster Club SHC title, before losing to Ballygunner in the 2022 All-Ireland club final. He served one year as Midleton manager in 2022. O'Connor accepted his first inter-county role in October 2022 when he was appointed manager of the Waterford minor hurling team.

== Honours ==
=== Player ===
Lismore

- Waterford Senior Hurling Championship: 1993
- Waterford Intermediate Football Championship: 2000
- Waterford Under-21 Hurling Championship: 1992, 1993
- Waterford Minor Hurling Championship: 1990

Waterford

- Munster Senior Hurling Championship: 2002
- Munster Under-21 Hurling Championship: 1994 (c)
- Munster Minor Hurling Championship: 1992

=== Management ===
Carrigtwohill

- Cork Senior Hurling Championship: 2011

Fr O'Neill's

- Munster Intermediate Club Hurling Championship: 2019
- Cork Premier Intermediate Hurling Championship: 2019

Ballyhale Shamrocks

- Leinster Senior Club Hurling Championship: 2020
- Kilkenny Senior Hurling Championship: 2020, 2021

Waterford

- All-Ireland Minor Hurling Championship: 2025

Sporting positions
Preceded by	Waterford under-21 hurling team captain 1994	Succeeded by
Preceded by Shane Ahearne	Waterford minor hurling team manager 2023-present	Succeeded by Incumbent
