= Paudie Casey =

Irish hurler

Personal information
- Native name: Páidí Ó Cathasaigh (Irish)
- Born: 1935 (age 90–91) Ballygunner, County Waterford, Ireland
- Occupation: Factory worker
- Height: 5 ft 11 in (180 cm)

Sport
- Sport: Hurling
- Position: Forward
Club
- Years: Club
- Ballygunner
Club titles
- Waterford titles: 3
Inter-county
- Years: County
- Waterford
Inter-county titles
- Munster titles: 1
- All-Irelands: 1
- NHL: 0

Paudie Casey (born 1935) is an Irish retired hurler who played as a forward for club side Ballygunner and at inter-county level with the Waterford senior hurling team.

== Honours ==
Ballygunner

- Waterford Senior Hurling Championship (1): 1966, 1967, 1968
- Waterford Junior Hurling Championship (1): 1957

Waterford

- All-Ireland Senior Hurling Championship (1): 1959
- Munster Senior Hurling Championship (1): 1959
