= Liam Moore (hurler) =

Irish hurler

Personal information
- Native name: Liam Ó Mórdha (Irish)
- Born: 2002 (age 23–24) Kilkenny, Ireland
- Height: 6 ft 0 in (183 cm)

Sport
- Sport: Hurling
- Position: Midfield
Club
- Years: Club
- 2020-present: Dicksboro
Club titles
- Kilkenny titles: 0
Inter-county
- Years: County
- 2026-: Kilkenny
Inter-county titles
- Leinster titles: 0
- All-Irelands: 0
- NHL: 0
- All Stars: 0

Liam Moore (born 2002) is an Irish hurler. At club level he plays with Dicksboro and at inter-county level with the Kilkenny senior hurling team.

== Career ==
Moore attended CBS Kilkenny and played in all grades of hurling during his time there, including in the Leinster PPS SAHC. At club level, he first played for Dicksboro at juvenile and underage levels. Moore captained Dicksboro to the Kilkenny MAHC title in 2019, while also claiming Kilkenny U19HC honours in 2019 and 2021. He was part of the Dicksboro senior team beaten by Ballyhale Shamrocks in the 2020 Kilkenny SHC final.

At inter-county level, Moore first played for Kilkenny as a member of the minor team that lost the 2019 All-Ireland MHC final to Galway. He later progressed to the under-20 team. Moore made his senior team debut in a National Hurling League game against Offaly in January 2026.

== Honours ==
Dicksboro

- Kilkenny Under-19 A Hurling Championship (2): 2019, 2021
- Kilkenny Minor A Hurling Championship (1): 2019 (c)
