= Ian Kenny =

Ian Kenny may refer to:

- Ian Kenny (rugby union), rugby union referee
- Ian Kenny (hurler), Irish hurler
- Ian Kenny, the lead vocalist of Birds of Tokyo and Karnivool
