= Matthew Conlan =

Matthew Conlan may refer to:

- Matt Conlan (born 1968), Australian politician
- Matthew Conlan (hurler) (born 1993), Irish hurler
