= 1993 Waterford Senior Hurling Championship =

Annual hurling competition season

- Sponsor: Lawlor's Hotel
- Champions: Lismore (3rd title); Paul Prendergast (captain); Seán Prendergast (manager)
- Runners-up: Passage; Noel Connors (captain); Séamus Keating (manager)

The 1993 Waterford Senior Hurling Championship was the 93rd staging of the Waterford Senior Hurling Championship since its establishment by the Waterford County Board in 1897.

Ballygunner were the defending champions.

On 3 October 1993, Lismore won the championship after an 0–08 to 0–07 defeat of Passage in the final. This was their third championship title overall and their first title since 1991. It remains their last championship victory.

== Knockout stage ==
=== Semi-finals ===
12 September 1993 Semi-final	Passage	1-07 - 0-10	Mount Sion	Walsh Park

18 September 1993 Semi-final	Lismore	1-10 - 0-12	Roanmore	Cappoquin Grounds

18 September 1993 Semi-final replay	Passage	3-06 - 2-08	Mount Sion	Walsh Park

=== Final ===
3 October 1993 Final	Lismore	0-08 - 0-07	Passage	Walsh Park
