= Joseph McLaughlin (hurler) =

Irish hurler

Personal information
- Native name: Seosamh Mac Lochlainn (Irish)
- Born: 2005 (age 20–21) Cushendall, County Antrim, Northern Ireland
- Occupation: Student

Sport
- Sport: Hurling
- Position: Right corner-forward
Club
- Years: Club
- 2023-present: Ruairí Óg
Club titles
- Antrim titles: 1
- Ulster titles: 1
Inter-county
- Years: County
- 2024-: Antrim
Inter-county titles
- Ulster titles: 0
- All-Irelands: 0
- NHL: 0
- All Stars: 0

Joseph McLaughlin (born 2005) is an Irish hurler. At club level he plays with Ruairí Óg and at inter-county level with the Antrim senior hurling team.

== Career ==
McLaughlin first played hurling at juvenile and underage levels with the Ruairí Óg club. He also lined out as a schoolboy with St Killian's College and captained the team to the Mageean Cup after a 0–17 to 0–13 defeat of Cross and Passion College in the 2023 final. McLaughlin made his senior team debut with Ruairí Óg in 2023. He ended the campaign with an Antrim SHC medal, before later claiming an Ulster Club SHC medal.

McLaughlin first appeared on the inter-county scene during a two-year tenure with the Antrim minor hurling team in 2021 and 2022. He immediately progressed to the under-20 team and won an Ulster U20HC medal in 2023. McLaughlin made his first appearances for the senior team during the 2024 National Hurling League.

== Career statistics ==
As of 11 February 2024

Team	Year	National League			Leinster		All-Ireland		Total	
Team	Year	Division	Apps	Score	Apps	Score	Apps	Score	Apps	Score
Antrim	2024	Division 1B	2	0-01	0	0-00	0	0-00	2	0-01
Career total			2	0-01	0	0-00	0	0-00	2	0-01

== Honours ==
St Killian's College

- Mageean Cup: 2023

Ruairí Óg

- Ulster Senior Club Hurling Championship: 2023
- Antrim Senior Hurling Championship: 2023

Antrim

- Ulster Under-20 Hurling Championship: 2023
