= Darragh Corcoran =

Irish hurler

Personal information
- Native name: Darragh Ó Corcáin (Irish)
- Born: 3 July 2000 (age 26) Ballyhale, County Kilkenny, Ireland
- Occupation: Student
- Height: 6 ft 3 in (191 cm)

Sport
- Sport: Hurling
- Position: Right wing-back
Club
- Years: Club
- 2019-present: Ballyhale Shamrocks
Club titles
- Kilkenny titles: 4
- Leinster titles: 3
- All-Ireland Titles: 2
College
- Years: College
- University of Limerick
College titles
- Fitzgibbon titles: 1
Inter-county*
Years	County	Apps (scores)
2021-	Kilkenny	1 (0-00)
Inter-county titles
- Leinster titles: 3
- All-Irelands: 0
- NHL: 0
- All Stars: 0
- *Inter County team apps and scores correct as of 22:19, 17 July 2021.

Darragh Corcoran (born 3 July 2000) is an Irish hurler who plays for Kilkenny Senior Championship club Ballyhale Shamrocks and at inter-county level with the Kilkenny senior hurling team. He usually lines out as a wing-back or a corner-back.

== Career ==
Corcoran first came to hurling prominence at college level with the St. Kieran's College team that won the All-Ireland Colleges Championship title in 2019. He simultaneously enjoyed success with the Ballyhale Shamrocks club, winning an All-Ireland Club Championship title in 2019. Corcoran first lined out at inter-county level as a member of the Kilkenny under-20 team during the 2020 Leinster Under-20 Championship. He was drafted onto the Kilkenny senior hurling team in 2021.

== Career statistics ==
As of match played 17 July 2021.

Team	Year	National League			Leinster		All-Ireland		Total	
Team	Year	Division	Apps	Score	Apps	Score	Apps	Score	Apps	Score
Kilkenny	2021	Division 1B	4	0-01	1	0-00	0	0-00	5	0-01
Total			4	0-01	1	0-00	0	0-00	5	0-01

== Honours ==
St. Kieran's College

- All-Ireland Colleges Senior Hurling Championship: 2019
- Leinster Colleges Senior Hurling Championship: 2019

University of Limerick

- Fitzgibbon Cup: 2022

Ballyhale Shamrocks

- All-Ireland Senior Club Hurling Championship: 2019, 2020
- Leinster Senior Club Hurling Championship: 2018, 2019, 2021
- Kilkenny Senior Hurling Championship: 2018, 2019, 2020, 2021

Kilkenny

- Leinster Senior Hurling Championship: 2021, 2022
