= All-Ireland Senior Championship =

All-Ireland Senior Championship may refer to a number of sports competitions organised by the Gaelic Athletic Association:

- All-Ireland Senior Camogie Championship, in the women's field sport of game of camogie played in Ireland
- All-Ireland Senior Football Championship, the premier competition in Gaelic football in Ireland
- All-Ireland Senior Hurling Championship
- All-Ireland Senior Ladies' Football Championship
- All-Ireland Senior Club Camogie Championship, in the Irish women's field sport of camogie
- All-Ireland Senior Club Football Championship, an annual Gaelic football tournament
- All-Ireland Senior Club Hurling Championship, an annual inter-county hurling competition
- All-Ireland Ladies Club Football Championship, the ladies; competition for club football teams
