= Jack Prendergast =

Irish hurler

Personal information
- Native name: Seán de Priondragás (Irish)
- Born: 1998 (age 27–28) Lismore, County Waterford, Ireland
- Occupation: Student
- Height: 5 ft 10 in (178 cm)

Sport
- Sport: Hurling
- Position: Left wing-forward
Club
- Years: Club
- Lismore
Club titles
- Waterford titles: 0
College
- Years: College
- 2016-present: Waterford Institute of Technology
College titles
- Fitzgibbon titles: 0
Inter-county*
Years	County	Apps (scores)
2019-present	Waterford	8 (0-07)
Inter-county titles
- Munster titles: 0
- All-Irelands: 0
- NHL: 1
- All Stars: 0
- *Inter County team apps and scores correct as of 23:54, 28 November 2020.

Jack Prendergast (born 1998) is an Irish hurler who plays for Waterford Senior Championship club Lismore and at inter-county level with the Waterford senior hurling team. He usually lines out as a left wing-forward.

== Playing career ==
=== Blackwater Community School ===
Prendergast first came to prominence as a hurler with Blackwater Community School in Lismore. He played in every grade of hurling before eventually joining the college's senior hurling team as a 14-year-old and lined out in several Harty Cup campaigns.

=== Waterford Institute of Technology ===
As a student at the Waterford Institute of Technology, Prendergast joined the senior hurling team during his second year. He lined out for WIT in the Fitzgibbon Cup campaigns in 2018 and 2019.

=== Lismore ===
Prendergast joined the Lismore club at a young age and played in all grades at juvenile and underage levels. He made his first appearance for the club's top adult team during the 2015 Waterford Intermediate Championship.

On 28 October 2016, Prendergast was at centre-forward when Lismore faced Dunhill in the Waterford Intermediate Championship final. He ended the game with a winners' medal and the man of the match award following a 5–19 to 1–07 victory. On 19 November, Prendergast scored a point from play when Lismore defeated Kilmoyley by 2–14 to 0–13 to win the Munster Championship.

=== Waterford ===
==== Minor and under-21 ====
Prendergast first played for Waterford as a member of the minor team during the 2015 Munster Championship. He made his first appearance on 8 April 2015 and top scored with 0-06 from frees in the 1–14 to 0–16 defeat by Tipperary. Prendergast ended the campaign as Waterford's top scorer with 0-09.

Prendergast was again eligible for the minor grade in 2016 and was an automatic inclusion on the Waterford starting fifteen in the Munster Championship. He played his last game in the grade on 29 June in a 0–19 to 0–17 defeat by Limerick at the semi-final stage.

Prendergrast progressed on the Waterford under-21 team in advance of the 2017 Munster Championship. He made his first appearance in that grade on 13 July when he lined out at right wing-forward in a 2–17 to 1–19 defeat by Cork at the semi-final stage.

Prendergast was again eligible for the under-21 team for the 2018 Munster Championship. Lining out in his second and final season in the grade, he made his only appearance on 20 June in a second successive 0–23 to 1–17 defeat by Cork at the semi-final stage.

==== Senior ====
Prendergast was added to the Waterford senior team prior to the start of the pre-season Munster League in 2019. He made his first appearance on 2 January when he came on as a 67th-minute substitute for Colm Roche in a 1–24 to 1–18 defeat of Cork. Prendergast was later included on the Waterford panel for the National League and made his first appearance on 27 January when he scored a goal in a 2–28 to 0–07 defeat of Offaly. On 31 March 2019, Prendergast was introduced as a substitute for Michael Walsh at centre-forward when Waterford suffered a 1–24 to 0–19 defeat by Limerick in the National League final. He made his first appearance in the Munster Championship on 12 May when he came on as a substitute for Jamie Barron in a 1–20 to 0–22 defeat by Clare.

== Career statistics ==
As of match played 28 November 2020.

Team	Year	National League			Munster		All-Ireland		Total	
Team	Year	Division	Apps	Score	Apps	Score	Apps	Score	Apps	Score
Waterford	2019	Division 1B	8	1-02	4	0-03	—		12	1-05
Waterford	2020	Division 1A	3	0-01	2	0-02	2	0-02	7	0-05
Career total			11	1-03	6	0-05	2	0-02	19	1-10

== Honours ==
Lismore

- Munster Intermediate Club Hurling Championship (1): 2016
- Waterford Intermediate Hurling Championship (1): 2016
