= 2020 Derry Senior Hurling Championship =

Annual hurling competition season

- Dates: 25 July - 13 September 2020
- Teams: 8
- Sponsor: Leadon Timberframe
- Champions: Slaughtneil (14th title); Cormac O'Doherty (captain); Michael McShane (manager)
- Runners-up: Kevin Lynch's; Geoffrey McGonagle (manager)

The 2020 Derry Senior Hurling Championship was the 75th staging of the Derry Senior Hurling Championship since its establishment by the Derry County Board in 1887. The championship had been scheduled to begin earlier, however, it was postponed indefinitely due to the impact of the COVID-19 pandemic on Gaelic games. The draw for the group stage placings took place on 25 June 2020. The championship eventually began on 25 July 2020 and ended on 13 September 2020.

Slaughtneil entered the championship as the defending champions.

The final was played on 13 September 2020 at Celtic Park, between Slaughtneil and Kevin Lynch's, in what was their second successive meeting in a final. Slaughneil won the match by 0–24 to 0–11 to claim their 14th championship title overall and an eighth title in succession.

== Results ==
=== Semi-finals ===
29 August 2020 Semi-final	Kevin Lynch's	3-23 - 0-09	Ballinascreen	Lavey GAC Grounds

30 August 2020 Semi-final	Slaughtneil	5-33 - 0-08	Swatragh	Dean McGlinchey Park

=== Final ===
13 September 2020 Final	Slaughtneil	0-23 - 0-11	Kevin Lynch's	Celtic Park
	C O’Doherty (0-12, 9f, 1 ’65’), B Rogers (0-3); J McGuigan (0-2), B Cassidy (0-2), S Cassidy (0-2), M McGuigan (0-1), G Bradley (0-1).	Report	E Cassidy (0-6, 5f), N Ferris (0-3); P O’Kane (0-1), D McGilligan (0-1).	Referee: E Hassan (Swatragh)
