= Knockboy, County Waterford =

Knockboy An Cnoc Buí
- Suburb
- Location within Ireland
- Coordinates: 52.231°N 7.062°W
- Country: Ireland
- Province: Munster
- County: Waterford
- Civil parish: Ballygunner

Knockboy (Irish: An Cnoc Buí, meaning 'yellow hill'), sometimes referred to as Ballygunner (Irish: Baile Mhic Gonair) after the civil parish in which it lies, is a suburb, townland and former village on the outskirts of Waterford City in Ireland. Originally an independent village, it has become part of Waterford City, due to urban sprawl, and now forms part of the city's suburbs. It is within the dual Catholic parishes of St. Joseph, St. Benildus and St Mary.

== History ==
The old village of Knockboy consisted of a 19th-century church and schoolhouse, a row of cottages and a small pub at the base of the hill. The church, Saint Mary's Catholic Church, was built in the early 19th century on the site of an earlier thatched chapel.

In 1948, a new national school (St. Mary's) was built at the top of the hill. In 1980, the boundaries of Waterford city were extended, making Knockboy part of the Greater Waterford area.

In 1984, the national school moved to a new premises beside Ballygunner GAA pitch. The buildings previously used by the national school, then unoccupied, became home to a Gaelscoil from 1991. This Gaelscoil, initially known as Scoil Éanna and later known as Gaelscoil Phort Láirge, had been based in Viewmount House prior to this move.

In the early 1990s, the original 19th-century cottages in Knockboy were demolished and new council houses were built at the site. In the 2000s, a new housing estate was built adjoining the original village, in practise making it a suburb of Waterford City.

Redevelopment of St Mary's church began in 2010. These works involved extending two sides of the church to increase its capacity from approximately 200 to over 400 people. St Mary's church, together with the church of St Joseph and St. Benildus in Newtown, is within the Roman Catholic Diocese of Waterford and Lismore.
