= 1991 Waterford Senior Hurling Championship =

Annual hurling competition season

- Champions: Lismore (2nd title); Séamus Prendergast (captain)
- Runners-up: Mount Sion; Shane Ahearne (captain)

The 1991 Waterford Senior Hurling Championship was the 91st staging of the Waterford Senior Hurling Championship since its establishment by the Waterford County Board in 1897.

Roanmore were the defending champions.

Lismore won the championship after a 5–07 to 1–05 defeat of Mount Sion in the final. This was their second championship title overall and a first title in 66 years.

== Knockout stage ==
=== Final ===
6 October 1991 Final	Lismore	5-07 - 1-05	Mount Sion	Walsh Park
