= Billy Nolan (hurler) =

Irish hurler

Personal information
- Native name: Liam Ó Nualláin (Irish)
- Born: 1998 (age 27–28) Waterford, Ireland
- Occupation: Student

Sport
- Sport: Hurling
- Position: Goalkeeper
Club
- Years: Club
- Roanmore
Club titles
- Waterford titles: 0
College
- Years: College
- 2017-present: Waterford Institute of Technology
College titles
- Fitzgibbon titles: 0
Inter-county*
Years	County	Apps (scores)
2017-present	Waterford	1 (0-00)
Inter-county titles
- Munster titles: 0
- All-Irelands: 0
- NHL: 0
- All Stars: 0
- *Inter County team apps and scores correct as of 17:17, 29 November 2020.

Billy Nolan (born 1998) is an Irish hurler who plays for Waterford Senior Championship club Roanmore and at inter-county level with the Waterford senior hurling team. He usually lines out as a goalkeeper.

== Playing career ==
=== Waterford Institute of Technology ===
As a student at the Waterford Institute of Technology, Nolan quickly joined the senior hurling team. He became the first choice goalkeeper for the 2019 Fitzgibbon Cup and made his first appearance on 20 January 2019 in a 0–16 to 0–14 defeat by DCU Dóchas Éireann.

=== Roanmore ===
Nolan joined the Roanmore club at a young age and played in all grades at juvenile and underage levels before eventually joining the club's top adult team in the Waterford Intermediate Championship.

=== Waterford ===
==== Minor and under-21 ====
Nolan first lined out for Waterford as a 15-year-old on the minor team during the 2014 Munster Championship. He made his first appearance as goalkeeper on 9 April in 1–13 to 0–11 defeat of Clare. On 13 July, Nolan lined out in goal for Waterford's 2–17 to 3–14 draw with Limerick in the Munster final. He retained his position in goal for the replay on 22 July, which Waterford lost by 0–24 to 0–18.

Nolan was retained as goalkeeper for the minor team for the 2015 Munster Championship. His season in this grade ended after defeats by Tipperary and Limerick.

Nolan was eligible for the minor grade for a third successive season the following year. He made three appearances as goalkeeper for Waterford during the Munster Championship and played his last game in the grade on 29 June 2016 in a 0–19 to 0–17 defeat by Limerick.

Nolan was just 16-years-old and in his first year with the Waterford minor team when he was also added to the under-21 for the Munster Championship. He made his debut in that grade on 17 June 2015 in a 1–21 to 1–11 defeat of Cork.

A rule change prevented the then 17-year-old Nolan from lining out with the under-21 team in 2016. As of 1 January 2016, all under-21 players at inter-county level had to be over 18 years and under 21 years of age. The rule change cost Nolan a place on Waterford's All-Ireland Championship-winning team.

Nolan resumed his place as goalkeeper on the under-21 team for the 2017 Munster Championship. He made his first appearance in two seasons on 13 July in a 2–17 to 1–19 defeat by Cork.

Nolan was again eligible for the under-21 team for the 2018 Munster Championship. Lining out in his third and final season in the grade, he made his only appearance on 20 June in a 0–23 to 1–17 defeat by Cork.

==== Senior ====
Nolan was added to the Waterford senior team prior to the start of the pre-season Munster League in 2017. He made his first appearance on 8 January, lining out at right wing-forward, and top scored for Waterford with 0–06 in a 0–24 to 1–14 defeat by Limerick. Nolan was later omitted from Waterford's panel for the National League.

On 27 January 2019, Nolan made his first appearance in the National League when he lined out in goal in Waterford's 2–28 to 0–07 victory of Offaly. On 31 March, he was an unused substitute when Waterford suffered a 1–24 to 0–19 defeat by Limerick in the National League final. On 8 June, Nolan made his Munster Championship debut when he replaced Stephen O'Keeffe as goalkeeper in Waterford's 2–30 to 2–17 defeat by Cork.

On 14 November 2020, Nolan was an unused substitute when Waterford suffered a 0–25 to 0–21 defeat by Limerick in the 2020 Munster final.

== Career statistics ==
As of match played 28 November 2020.

Team	Year	National League			Munster		All-Ireland		Total	
Team	Year	Division	Apps	Score	Apps	Score	Apps	Score	Apps	Score
Waterford Minor	2014	—			4	0-00	2	0-00	6	0-00
Waterford Minor	2015	—			2	0-00	—		2	0-00
Waterford Minor	2016	—			3	0-00	—		3	0-00
Waterford Minor	Total	—			9	0-00	2	0-00	11	0-00
Waterford U21	2015	—			2	0-00	—		2	0-00
Waterford U21	2016	—			—		—		—	
Waterford U21	2017	—			1	0-00	—		1	0-00
Waterford U21	2018	—			1	0-00	—		1	0-00
Waterford U21	Total	—			4	0-00	—		4	0-00
Waterford	2017	Division 1A	—		—		—		—	
Waterford	2018	Division 1A	—		—		—		—	
Waterford	2019	Division 1B	4	0-00	1	0-00	—		5	0-00
Waterford	2020	Division 1A	2	0-01	0	0-00	0	0-00	2	0-01
Waterford	Total		6	0-01	1	0-00	—		7	0-01
Career total			6	0-01	14	0-00	2	0-00	22	0-01
