= Matthew Conlan (hurler) =

Irish sportsperson

Personal information
- Full name: Matthew Conlan
- Occupation: Accountant
- Height: 6 ft 0 in (183 cm)

Sport
- Sport: Hurling
- Position: Defender or Midfielder
Club
- Years: Club
- 2011-: Portaferry
Club titles
- Down titles: 7
- Ulster titles: 1
Inter-county
- Years: County
- 2012-: Down
Inter-county titles
- All-Irelands: Christy Ring (2013), National League 2a, 2b

Matthew Conlan
