= Fintan Burke =

Irish hurler

Personal information
- Native name: Fiontán de Burca (Irish)
- Born: 1997 (age 28–29) Kilchreest, County Galway, Ireland
- Occupation: Electrician
- Height: 6 ft 2 in (188 cm)

Sport
- Sport: Hurling
- Position: Full Back
Club
- Years: Club
- St Thomas'
Club titles
- Galway titles: 7
Inter-county*
Years	County	Apps (scores)
2020–	Galway	1 (0-1)
Inter-county titles
- Leinster titles: 0
- All-Irelands: 0
- NHL: 1
- All Stars: 0
- *Inter County team apps and scores correct as of 19:03, 31 October 2020.

Fintan Burke (born 1997) is an Irish hurler who plays for Galway Senior Championship club St Thomas' and at inter-county level with the Galway senior hurling team. He usually lines out as a full-back.

== Honours ==
St Thomas'

- Galway Senior Hurling Championship (7): 2016, 2018, 2019, 2020, 2021, 2022, 2023

Galway

- National Hurling League (1): 2021
- All-Ireland Minor Hurling Championship (1): 2015
