= 2022 Waterford Senior Hurling Championship =

Annual hurling competition season

- Dates: 28 July – 11 September 2022
- Teams: 12
- Sponsor: J. J. Kavanagh & Sons
- Champions: Ballygunner (21st title); Dessie Hutchinson (captain); Ian Kenny (captain); Darragh O'Sullivan (manager)
- Runners-up: Mount Sion; Austin Gleeson (captain); John Meaney (manager)
- Relegated: Dunhill

Tournament statistics
- Matches played: 26
- Goals scored: 77 (2.96 per match)
- Points scored: 929 (35.73 per match)
- Top scorer(s): Tomás Ryan (2–47)

The 2022 Waterford Senior Hurling Championship was the 122nd staging of the Waterford Senior Hurling Championship since its establishment by the Waterford County Board in 1897. The draw for the group stage placing took place on 31 January 2022. The championship ran from 28 July to 11 September 2022.

Ballygunner entered the championship as the defending champions.

The final was played on 11 September 2022 at Walsh Park in Waterford, between Ballygunner and Mount Sion, in what was their 14th meeting in the final overall and a first meeting in the final in 8 years. Ballygunner won the match by 2–11 to 0–08 to claim their 21st championship title overall and a record-equalling ninth title in succession.

Tallow's Tomás Ryan was the championship's top scorer with 2–47.

== Team changes ==
=== To Championship ===
Promoted from the Waterford Intermediate Hurling Championship

- Dunhill

=== From Championship ===
Relegated to the Waterford Intermediate Hurling Championship

- Ballyduff Upper
- Ballysaggart

== Group A ==
=== Group A table ===
Advance to quarter-finals Advance to preliminary quarter-finals

Team	Matches				Score			Pts
Team	Pld	W	D	L	For	Against	Diff	Pts
Ballygunner	2	2	0	0	47	21	26	4
De La Salle	2	1	0	1	35	37	−2	2
Passage	2	0	0	2	22	46	−24	0

=== Group A results ===
30 July 2022 Round 1	Ballygunner	1–19 – 1–07	Passage	Walsh Park
	Pauric Mahony 1–9, D Hutchinson 0–3, M Mahony 0–2, P Fitzgerald 0–2, K Mahony 0–1, B O'Keeffe 0–1, T Foley 0–1.		E Reilly 1–3, T Whitty 0–2, M Fitzgerald 0–1, K Fitzgerald 0–1.

6 August 2022 Round 2	Ballygunner	0–25 – 1–08	De La Salle	Walsh Park
	Pauric Mahony 0–8 D Hutchinson 0–8, K Mahony 0–3, M Mahony 0–1, S O'Sullivan 0–1, H Ruddle 0–1, C Sheehan 0–1, B O'Keeffe 0–1, P Fitzgerald 0–1.		R Halloran 1–0, B Cunningham 0–2, J Fagan 0–2, T Douglas 0–2, E Madigan 0–1, K Moran 0–1.

13 August 2022 Round 3	Passage	0–12 – 0–24	De La Salle	Walsh Park
	O Connors 0–5, K Fitzgerald 0–2, L Flynn 0–2, G Cullinane 0–1, E Reilly 0–1, M Fitzgerald 0–1.		R Halloran 0–7, B Cunningham 0–4, J Fagan 0–3, E Barrett 0–3, E Madigan 0–2, C McCann 0–2, T Moran 0–1, K Moran 0–1, T Douglas 0–1.

== Group B ==
=== Group B table ===
Advance to quarter-finals Advance to preliminary quarter-finals

Team	Matches				Score			Pts
Team	Pld	W	D	L	For	Against	Diff	Pts
Mount Sion	2	2	0	0	59	26	33	4
Abbeyside	2	1	0	1	41	55	−14	2
Tallow	2	0	0	2	34	53	−19	0

=== Group B results ===
31 July 2022 Round 1	Mount Sion	2–26 – 0–15	Abbeyside	Fraher Field
	A Gleeson 1–9, J Gleeson 1–2, O Whelan 0–5, MF O'Neill 0–2, M O'Neill 0–2, E Curran 0–2, S Roche 0–2, S O'Neill 0–1, B Flanagan 0–1.		M Kiely 0–3, M O'Halloran 0–2, M Ferncombe 0–2, S Callaghan 0–2, S Whelan-Barrett 0–2, C Treen 0–1, J McGrath 0–1, P Hurney 0–1, T Looby 0–1.

7 August 2022 Round 2	Mount Sion	2–21 – 0–11	Tallow	Fraher Field
	M O'Neill 1–6, S Roche 0–6, A Kirwan 1–1, J Gleeson 0–2, O Whelan 0–2, J Meaney 0–2, E Curran 0–1, J Kennedy 0–1.		T Ryan 0–8, I Beecher 0–2, E Sheehan 0–1.

14 August 2022 Round 3	Abbeyside	2–20 – 3–14	Tallow	Fraher Field
	M Ferncombe 1–12, W Beresford 1–0, M Kiely 0–3, M O'Halloran 0–3, P Hurney 0–2.		T Ryan 2–11, R Grey 1–1, I Beecher 0–1, M O'Brien 0–1.

== Group C ==
=== Group C table ===
Advance to quarter-finals Advance to preliminary quarter-finals

Team	Matches				Score			Pts
Team	Pld	W	D	L	For	Against	Diff	Pts
Roanmore	2	2	0	0	52	30	22	4
Lismore	2	1	0	1	45	44	1	2
Dunhill	2	0	0	2	29	52	−23	0

=== Group C results ===
31 July 2022 Round 1	Roanmore	2–20 – 0–19	Lismore	Fraher Field
	G O'Brien 0–10, D Reidy 1–0, E O'Toole 1–0, B Nolan 0–3, C Dempsey 0–2, L Hearne 0–2, E Flynn 0–1, C Ryan 0–1, S Mackey 0–1.		J Prendergast 0–10, O O'Gorman 0–4, P O'Keeffe 0–1, P Prendergast 0–1, D Shanahan 0–1, R Barry 0–1, J Prendergast 0–1.

6 August 2022 Round 2	Roanmore	4–14 – 1–08	Dunhill	Walsh Park
	L Hearne 1–2, C Ryan 1–2, E Flynn 1–0, C Wadding 1–0, B Nolan 0–2, E O'Toole 0–2, G O'Brien 0–2, I Chester 0–1, S Burke 0–1, C Dempsey 0–1, R Furlong 0–1.		E Murphy 1–1, M Harney 0–4, D Power 0–1, E Casey 0–1, D Murray 0–1.

14 August 2022 Round 3	Lismore	2–20 – 0–18	Dunhill	Fraher Field
	J Prendergast 1–13, J O'Keeffe 1–1, J Shanahan 0–2, D Shanahan 0–1, O O'Gorman 0–1, R Barry 0–1, F Reaney 0–1.		C Bonner 0–4, M Harney 0–3, J Groves 0–3, E Murphy 0–2, D Murray 0–2, M Healy 0–1, S Casey 0–1, C Quinn 0–1, A Green 0–1.

== Group D ==
=== Group D table ===
Advance to quarter-finals Advance to preliminary quarter-finals

Team	Matches				Score			Pts
Team	Pld	W	D	L	For	Against	Diff	Pts
Dungarvan	2	2	0	0	47	21	26	4
Fourmilewater	2	1	0	1	35	37	−2	2
Clonea	2	0	0	2	22	46	−24	0

=== Group D results ===
28 July 2022 Round 1	Dungarvan	1–18 – 0–13	Fourmilewater	Fraher Field
	P Curran 1–9, Cathal Curran 0–3, M Kiely 0–3, E O'Callaghan 0–1, Colm Curran 0–1, J Burke 0–1.		A Ryan 0–10, C Walsh 0–1, J Barron 0–1, C Gleeson 0–1.

7 August 2022 Round 2	Dungarvan	1–19 – 1–19	Clonea	Fraher Field
	P Curran 0–11, M Kiely 1–3, C Curran 0–2, J Burke 0–2, G Crotty 0–1.		J Gleeson 0–14, J Power 1–0, B Power 0–2, C Power 0–1, C Kirwan 0–1, F Roche 0–1.

13 August 2022 Round 3	Fourmilewater	3–24 – 0–19	Clonea	Fraher Field
	A Ryan 0–9, J Barron 1–3, C Walsh 0–6, S Walsh 1–2, S O'Meara 0–1, T Guiry 0–1, T Barron 0–1, O Walsh 0–1.		J Gleeson 0–7, C Kirwan 0–4, F Roche 0–3, B Power 0–2, J Power 0–1, S Clancy 0–1, D Hassett 0–1.

== Knockout stage ==
=== Preliminary quarter-finals ===
20 August 2022 Preliminary quarter-final	Clonea	1–17 – 0–22	Lismore	Fraher Field
	J Power 1–3, J Gleeson 0–6, B Power 0–3, S Clancy 0–2, M Curry 0–1, C Kirwan 0–1, C Power 0–1.		J Prendergast 0–8, J Shanahan 0–5, P Prendergast 0–4, J O'Keeffe 0–2, J Heneghan 0–2, A Whelan 0–1.

20 August 2022 Preliminary quarter-final	Passage	1–13 – 1–18	Fourmilewater	Fraher Field
	M Fitzgerald 1–1, O Connors 0–4, L Flynn 0–3, E Reilly 0–3, G Cullinane 0–1, P Walsh 0–1.		A Ryan 0–10, S O'Meara 1–1, T Guiry 0–2, K Brazil 0–1, T Barron 0–1, J Barron 0–1, D Guiry 0–1, S Walsh 0–1.

21 August 2022 Preliminary quarter-final	De La Salle	2–20 – 0–14	Tallow	Fraher Field
	R Halloran 0–8, E Barrett 1–2, B Cunningham 1–1, J Fagan 0–2, E Madigan 0–2, C McCann 0–2, T Douglas 0–1, T Moran 0–1, J Dillon 0–1.		T Ryan 0–10, M Stewart 0–2, R Grey 0–1, K Geary 0–1.

21 August 2022 Preliminary quarter-final	Abbeyside	3–13 – 1–18	Dunhill	Fraher Field
	M Ferncombe 0–8, M O'Halloran 1–2, N Montgomery 1–0, E Kiely 1–0, M Kiely 0–1, W Beresford 0–1, T Looby 0–1.		S Casey 1–6, E Murphy 0–4, C Bonner 0–2, A Greene 0–2, M Halley 0–1, C Quinn 0–1, D Swift 0–1, D Power 0–1.

=== Relegation playoffs ===
27 August 2022 Semi-final	Passage	3–17 – 1–11	Tallow	Fraher Field
	M Fitzgerald 2–3, E Reilly 0–9, P Walsh 1–3, P Flynn 0–1 D Lynch 0–1.		T Ryan 0–9, D Buckley 1–0, I Beecher 0–1, M O'Brien 0–1.

28 August 2022 Semi-final	Dunhill	2–14 – 5–12	Clonea	Walsh Park
	S Casey 1–5, E Murphy 1–3, D Swift 0–2, D Murray 0–2, K Dineen 0–1, E Casey 0–1.		C Kirwan 3–3, J Gleeson 1–7, C Dalton 1–0, F Roche 0–1, M Curry 0–1.

3 September 2022 Final	Tallow	1–19 – 0–18	Dunhill	Fraher Field
	T Ryan 0–9 (4fs, 1 65), I Beecher 0–5, D Buckley 1–0, M Stewart 0–3, R Grey 0–2.	Report	S Casey 0–11 (8fs), E Murphy 0–5 (1f, 1 65), A Green, J Groves 0–1 each.

=== Quarter-finals ===
27 August 2022 Quarter-final	Roanmore	1–22 – 2–11	Abbeyside	Walsh Park
	G O'Brien 0–15, L Hearne 1–1, S Mackey 0–2, C Chester 0–1, B Nolan 0–1, C Ryan 0–1, E Flynn 0–1.,	Report	M Kiely 1–2, C Treen 0–5, C Prunty 1–1, M O'Halloran 0–1, P Hurney 0–1, M Twomey 0–1.

27 August 2022 Quarter-final	Dungarvan	1–20 – 2–24	De La Salle	Walsh Park
	P Curran 1–10, Colm Curran 0–3, Cathal Curran 0–2, M Kiely 0–2, J Nagle 0–1, J Duggan 0–1, G Crotty 0–1.	Report	T Douglas 1–5, R Halloran 1–5, J Fagan 0–4, E Barrett 0–2, B Cunningham 0–2, E Meaney 0–2, K Moran 0–2, C McCann 0–1, S McNulty 0–1.

28 August 2022 Quarter-final	Ballygunner	1–27 – 1–15	Fourmilewater	Fraher Field
	Pauric Mahony 0–11, K Mahony 1–2, M Mahony 0–3, D Hutchinson 0–3, T O'Sullivan 0–2, C Sheehan 0–2, T Foley 0–1, S O'Sullivan 0–1, P Hogan 0–1, P Fitzgerald 0–1.	Report	A Ryan 0–10, S Walsh 1–0, T Barron 0–3, F Hallinan 0–2.

28 August 2022 Quarter-final	Mount Sion	1–27 – 0–13	Lismore	Fraher Field
	A Gleeson 1–6, A Kirwan 0–5, O Whelan 0–4, S Roche 0–2, E Curran 0–2, D Butler 0–2, D Power 0–1, MF O'Neill 0–1, B Flanagan 0–1, M O'Neill 0–1, J Meaney 0–1, J Gleeson 0–1.	Report	J Prendergast 0–7, P Prendergast 0–2, J Heneghan 0–1, R Barry 0–1, J Shanahan 0–1, J O'Keeffe 0–1.

=== Semi-finals ===
4 September 2022 Semi-final	Ballygunner	2–17 – 0–12	Roanmore	Walsh Park
	Pauric Mahony (0–8, 6 frees, 1 65); D Hutchinson, P Fitzgerald (1–2 each); E Sheahan, K Mahony (0–2 each); T O’Sullivan (0–1).	Report	G O’Brien (0–8, frees); L Hearne (0–2); E Flynn (0–1).	Referee: N Barry (Passage)

4 September 2022 Semi-final	Mount Sion	1–19 – 2–12	De La Salle	Walsh Park
	A Gleeson (0–6, 3 frees); M O’Neill (1–3); A Kirwan (0–3); O Whelan, S Roche (0–2 each); J Meaney, J Gleeson, E Curran (0–1 each).	Report	R Halloran (1–4, 0–3 frees, 0–1 65); E Meaney (1–0); B Cunningham (0–2); T Douglas, E Barrett, C McCann, J Dillon, T Moran, J Fagan (0–1 each).	Referee: T Walsh (Modeligo)

=== Final ===
11 September 2022 Final	Ballygunner	2–11 – 0–08	Mount Sion	Walsh Park
	Pauric Mahony (1–4, 0–4 frees); P Hogan (1–1); D Hutchinson, B O’Keeffe (0–2 each); M Mahony, K Mahony (0–1 each).	Report	A Gleeson (0–5, 4 frees); E Curran, O Whelan, Martin O’Neill (0–1 each).	Referee: T Walsh (Mideligo)

== Championship statistics ==
=== Top scorers ===
Overall

Rank	Player	Club	Tally	Total	Matches	Average
1	Tomás Ryan	Tallow	2–47	53	5	10.60
2	Pauric Mahony	Ballygunner	2–40	46	5	9.20
3	Jack Prendergast	Lismore	1–39	42	4	10.50
4	Aaron Ryan	Fourmilewater	0–39	39	4	9.75
5	Jason Gleeson	Clonea	1–34	37	4	9.25
6	Patrick Curran	Dungarvan	2–30	36	3	12.00
7	Gavin O'Brien	Roanmore	0–35	35	4	8.75
8	Reuben Halloran	De La Salle	3–24	33	5	6.60
9	Austin Gleeson	Mount Sion	2–26	32	5	6.40
10	Shane Casey	Dunhill	2–23	29	4	7.25

In a single game

Rank	Player	Club	Tally	Total	Opposition
1	Tomás Ryan	Tallow	2–11	17	Abbeyside
2	Jack Prendergast	Lismore	1–13	16	Dunhill
3	Mark Ferncombe	Abbeyside	1–12	15	Tallow
3	Gavin O'Brien	Roanmore	0–15	15	Abbeyside
5	Jason Gleeson	Clonea	0–14	14	Dungarvan
6	Patrick Curran	Dungarvan	1–10	13	De La Salle
7	Ciarán Kirwan	Clonea	3-03	12	Dunhill
7	Pauric Mahony	Ballygunner	1-09	12	Passage
7	Austin Gleeson	Mount Sion	1-09	12	Abbeyside
7	Patrick Curran	Dungarvan	1-09	12	Fourmilewater
