= 2020 Kilkenny Senior Hurling Championship =

Annual hurling competition season

- Dates: 29 August 2020 – 27 September 2020
- Teams: 12
- Sponsor: St. Canice's Credit Union
- Champions: Ballyhale Shamrocks (18th title); Richie Reid (captain); James O'Connor (manager)
- Runners-up: Dicksboro; Conor Doheny (captain); Mark Dowling (manager)
- Relegated: Danesfort

Tournament statistics
- Matches played: 14
- Goals scored: 49 (3.5 per match)
- Points scored: 501 (35.79 per match)

The 2020 Kilkenny Senior Hurling Championship was the 126th staging of the Kilkenny Senior Hurling Championship since its establishment by the Kilkenny County Board in 1887. The championship began on 29 August 2020 and ended on 27 September 2020.

Ballyhale Shamrocks were the defending champions. Danesfort were relegated after suffering a 1–15 to 1–13 defeat by Graigue-Ballycallan in a playoff.

On 27 September 2020, Ballyhale Shamrocks won the championship after a 5–19 to 1–10 defeat of Dicksboro in the final at UPMC Nowlan Park. It was their 18th championship title overall and their third title in succession.

== Team changes ==
=== To Championship ===
Promoted from the Kilkenny Intermediate Hurling Championship

- Tullaroan

=== From Championship ===
Relegated to the Kilkenny Intermediate Hurling Championship

- St. Patrick's Ballyragget

== Results ==
=== First round ===
29 August 2020 First round	Ballyhale Shamrocks	4-34 - 0-08	Rower-Inistioge	UPMC Nowlan Park
	TJ Reid (1-16, 0-7 frees); E Cody (1-4); B Cody (1-3); C Fennelly (1-1); J Cuddihy, D Mullen (0-3 each); E Shefflin, D Corcoran (0-2 each).	Report	D Kelly (0-3, frees); T Doyle, C Bolger (0-2 each); C Ryan (0-1).

29 August 2020 First round	Danesfort	1-25 - 5-27 (aet)	Mullinavat	UPMC Nowlan Park
	R Hogan 0-16, P Hogan 1-1, J Bruton 0-3, P Mullen 0-2, P Hickey 0-1, R Walsh 0-1, P Cooney 0-1.		J Walsh 2-12, O Knox 2-2, G Malone 1-1, W O'Dwyer 0-3, M Malone 0-2, C Walsh 0-2, S Aylward 0-1, I Duggan 0-1, M Mansfield 0-1, R Malone 0-1, A Mansfield 0-1.

30 August 2020 First round	Bennettsbridge	0-20 - 1-15	Graigue-Ballycallan	UPMC Nowlan Park
	N Cleere 0-11, E Morrissey 0-2, K Blanchfield 0-2, L Blanchfield 0-2, H O'Neill 0-1, A Cleere 0-1, C Brennan 0-1.		C Murphy 1-12, A Brennan 0-1, S Ryan 0-1, S Butler 0-1.

30 August 2020 First round	Tullaroan	1-20 - 2-18	Erin's Own	UPMC Nowlan Park
	S Walsh 1-7, D Simpson 0-4, B Gaffney 0-4, J Walton 0-3, T Dunne 0-2.		M Murphy 0-6, S Feehan 1-2, E Brennan 1-1, J Mullins 0-4, C Fogarty 0-2, N McMahon 0-1, J Buggy 0-1, N Moran 0-1.

=== Relegation playoffs ===
5 September 2020 Semi-final	Tullaroan	1-19 - 1-12	Danesfort	Páirc Lachtain
	P Walsh 1-4, S Walsh 0-5, M Keoghan 0-2, J Walton 0-2, D Simpson 0-2, T Walsh 0-1, T Dunne 0-1, B Gaffney 0-1, M Walsh 0-1.		P Hogan 0-9, P Hickey 0-3, D Dunphy Wallace 1-0.

5 September 2020 Semi-final	Graigue-Ballycallan	4-13 - 2-24	Rower-Inistioge	Páirc Dún Iomagáin
	S Ryan 3-0, S Butler 0-4, C Murphy 0-4, B Ryan 1-0, O Egan 0-3, T Ronan 0-2.		M Galavan 0-10, D Lyng 2-0, P Lyng 0-4, T Doyle 0-4, J Ryan 0-3, K Ryan 0-1, J Walsh 0-1, K Joyce 0-1.

13 September 2020 Final	Danesfort	1-13 - 1-15	Graigue-Ballycallan	John Locke Park
	P Hogan (1-9, 1-5 frees, 0-2 65), R Walsh (0-2), P Hickey (0-1), P Mullen (0-1, line ball).	Report	C Murphy (0-7, 0-6 frees, 0-1 65); B Ryan (1-1); S Butler (0-3); S Ryan (0-2); A Brennan, P Cahill (0-1 each).

=== Quarter-finals ===
5 September 2020 Quarter-final	Dicksboro	3-27 - 2-14	Bennettsbridge	UPMC Nowlan Park
	S Stapleton (0-8, 0-5 frees); L Moore, B Sheehan (1-2); A Nolan (1-0); E Gough, M Nolan, M Gaffney (0-3 each); O Gough (0-3, 0-1 free); O Walsh, C Kavanagh, T Kenny (0-1 each).		N Cleere (0-6, 0-5 frees); H O’Neill, K Blanchfield (1-2 each); L Blanchfield (0-2); A Cleere, C Brennan (0-1 each).

5 September 2020 Quarter-final	O'Loughlin Gaels	2-14 - 0-10	Erin's Own	UPMC Nowlan Park
	M Bergin (0-6, 0-5 frees); E O’Shea, P Butler (1-1 each); O Wall, L Hogan (0-2 each); D Burke, J Molloy (0-1 each).		M Murphy (0-8, 0-6 frees, 0-1 65); M Boran, C Fogarty (0-1 each).

6 September 2020 Quarter-final	Clara	0-11 - 4-18	Ballyhale Shamrocks	UPMC Nowlan Park
	L Ryan 0-3, C Bolger 0-3, M O'Connell 0-1, J Langton 0-1, L Ryan 0-1, J Nolan 0-1, P Nolan 0-1.		TJ Reid 1-7, E Reid 2-1, E Cody 1-2, D Corcoran 0-3, B Cody 0-2, C Fennelly 0-1, E Shefflin 0-1, J Holden 0-1, D Mullen 0-1.

6 September 2020 Quarter-final	James Stephens	1-21 - 1-16	Mullinavat	UPMC Nowlan Park
	E Guilfoyle 0-6, T Dwyer 0-6, C Kenny 0-5, C Browne 0-3, N Brassil 1-0, D Stapleton 0-1, M Drennan 0-1.		J Walsh 1-9, P Dempsey 0-2, W O'Dwyer 0-2, I Duggan 0-2, M Malone 0-1.

=== Semi-finals ===
12 September 2020 Semi-final	Dicksboro	2-16 - 0-14	O'Loughlin Gaels	UPMC Nowlan Park
	S Stapleton (1-10, 0-8 frees, 0-2 sidelines); A Nolan (1-1); B Sheehan (0-2); T Kenny, L Moore, C Kelly (0-1 each).	Report	E O’Shea (0-6); M Bergin (0-4, frees) O Wall, P Butler, H Lawlor, S Bolger (0-1 each).

12 September 2020 Semi-final	Ballyhale Shamrocks	3-22 - 1-26	James Stephens	UPMC Nowlan Park
	TJ Reid (1-8, 1-0 pen, 0-5 frees); C Fennelly (2-5); B Cody, E Cody (0-3 each); R Corcoran, E Reid, P Mullen (0-1 each).	Report	E Guilfoyle (1-11, 0-9 frees, 1 65); C Kenny, T Dwyer, M Ruth (0-3 each); C Browne (0-2); T Dwyer, W Spencer, L Scanlon, N Mullins (0-1 each).

=== Final ===
27 September 2020 Final	Dicksboro	1-10 - 5-19	Ballyhale Shamrocks	UPMC Nowlan Park
	S Stapleton (0-7, frees); A Gaffney (1-1); B Sheehan, E Carroll (0-1 each).	Report	TJ Reid (0-8, 3 frees, 3 65s); E Reid (2-2); B Cody, E Cody (1-1 each); C Fennelly (1-0); R Corcoran (0-3); P Mullen, J Cuddihy, D Corcoran, C Walsh (0-1 each).	Referee: R Byrne (Glenmore)

== Championship statistics ==
=== Top scorers ===
Rank	Player	Club	Tally	Total	Matches	Average
1	T. J. Reid	Ballyhale Shamrocks	3-39	48	4	12.00
2	John Walsh	Mullinavat	3-21	30	2	15.00
3	Shane Stapleton	Dicksboro	1-25	28	3	9.33
4	Conor Murphy	Graigue-Ballycallan	1-23	26	3	8.66
5	Paddy Hogan	Danesfort	2-19	25	3	8.33
6	Eoin Guilfoyle	James Stephens	1-17	20	2	10.00
7	Colin Fennelly	Ballyhale Shamrocks	4-07	19	4	4.75
7	Eoin Cody	Ballyhale Shamrocks	3-10	19	4	4.75
9	Nicky Cleere	Bennettsbridge	0-17	17	2	8.50
10	Eoin Reid	Ballyhale Shamrocks	4-07	19	4	4.75
10	Richie Hogan	Danesfort	0-16	16	1	16.00
