= 2022 All-Ireland Senior Club Hurling Championship final =

2022 All-Ireland Senior Club Hurling Championship Final
- Event: 2021-22 All-Ireland Senior Club Hurling Championship
Ballyhale Shamrocks	Ballygunner
1-19 (22)	2-17 (23)
- Date: 13 February 2022
- Venue: Croke Park, Dublin
- Referee: James Owens (Wexford)
- Weather: Dry

The 2022 All-Ireland Senior Club Hurling Championship final was a hurling match that was played at Croke Park on 12 February 2022 to determine the winners of the 2021-22 All-Ireland Senior Club Hurling Championship, the 51st season of the All-Ireland Senior Club Hurling Championship, a tournament organised by the Gaelic Athletic Association for the champion clubs of the four provinces of Ireland. The final was contested by Ballyhale Shamrocks of Kilkenny and Ballygunner of Waterford.

The final was the second ever championship meeting between the two teams. Ballyhale Shamrocks were hoping to win their 9th All-Ireland Club Championship and a record-breaking third title in succession, while Ballygunner were bidding to win their first ever title.

Ballygunner won the game with a goal in the final play of the game from Harry Ruddle, shooting low from long range to the left of the net past Ballyhale goalkeeper Dean Mason to win the game 2–17 to 1–19.

== Match ==
=== Details ===
12 February 2022 Final	Ballygunner (Waterford)	2-17 - 1-19	Ballyhale Shamrocks (Kilkenny)	Croke Park
	Pauric Mahony 0-7 (7 fs), D Hutchinson 1-3; H Ruddle 1-0; M Mahony 0-3; B O’Keeffe, K Mahony 0-2 each.	Report	TJ Reid 0-8 (4 fs, 65); E Reid 1-0; A Mullen, E Shefflin 0-2 each; E Cody, P Mullen, J Cuddihy, D Corcoran, B Cody, C Fennelly, R Reid 0-1 each.	Referee: J Owens (Wexford)
