= 2020 Waterford Senior Hurling Championship =

Annual hurling competition season

- Dates: 24 July 2020 – 30 August 2020
- Teams: 12
- Sponsor: J. J. Kavanagh & Sons
- Champions: Ballygunner (19th title); Philip Mahony (captain); Barry Coughlan (captain); Darragh O'Sullivan (manager)
- Runners-up: Passage; Eddie Lynch (captain); Michael Walsh (manager)

Tournament statistics
- Matches played: 19
- Goals scored: 56 (2.95 per match)
- Points scored: 645 (33.95 per match)
- Top scorer(s): Maurice Shanahan (3–44)

The 2020 Waterford Senior Hurling Championship was the 120th staging of the Waterford Senior Hurling Championship since its establishment by the Waterford County Board in 1897. The original championship draw took place on 21 January 2020, however, due to the coronavirus pandemic in Ireland the draws for a rescheduled championship took place on 15 June 2020 with a new format being adopted and relegation being abolished. The championship took place between 24 July and 30 August 2020.

Ballygunner were the defending champions.

On 30 August 2020, Ballygunner won the championship after a 1–23 to 0–09 defeat of Passage in the final at Walsh Park. This was their 19th championship title overall and their seventh title in succession.

Lismore's Maurice Shanahan was the championship's top scorer with 3–44.

== Team changes ==
=== To Championship ===
Promoted from the Waterford Intermediate Hurling Championship

- Ballysaggart

=== From Championship ===
Relegated to the Waterford Intermediate Hurling Championship

- Ballyduff Upper

== Results/fixtures ==
=== Group A ===
==== Table ====
Advance to quarter-finals

Team	Matches				Score			Pts
Team	Pld	W	D	L	For	Against	Diff	Pts
Ballygunner	2	2	0	0	4–42	0–24	30	4
Passage	2	1	0	1	1–33	2–37	−7	2
Tallow	2	0	0	2	0–26	3–40	−23	0

==== Results ====
24 July 2020 Round 1	Ballygunner	2–22 – 0–09	Tallow	Fraher Field
	D Hutchinson 2–5 (2fs), Pauric Mahony 0–8 (7fs), T O'Sullivan, K Mahony, C Sheahan 0–2 each, M Mahony, C Power, P Hogan 0–1 each.	Report	D Buckley 0–3 (3fs), D O'Brien 0–2, B McCarthy, J Henley, T Ryan, R Grey 0–1 each.	Referee: T Walsh

2 August 2020 Round 2	Passage	1–18 – 0–17	Tallow	Fraher Field
	M Cummins 0–9, L Flynn 1–2, E Reilly 0–2, O Connors 0–1, D Lynch 0–1, P Flynn 0–1, K Fitzgerald 0–1, J Whitty 0–1.		R Grey 0–7, I Beecher 0–4, T Ryan 0–3, M O'Brien 0–1, K Geary 0–1, R O'Sullivan 0–1.

8 August 2020 Round 3	Ballygunner	2–20 – 0–15	Passage	Walsh Park
	P Mahony 0–11, M Mahony 1–1, D Hutchinson 1–1, C Power 0–3, B O'Keeffe 0–2, S O'Sullivan 0–1, C Sheehan 0–1.		M Cummins 0–8, K Fitzgerald 0–4, O Connors 0–2, J Burke 0–1.

=== Group B ===
==== Table ====
Team	Matches				Score			Pts
Team	Pld	W	D	L	For	Against	Diff	Pts
Roanmore	2	2	0	0	6–37	2–26	23	4
Mount Sion	2	1	0	1	1–36	3–34	−4	2
Clonea	2	0	0	2	3–22	5–35	−19	0

==== Results ====
26 July 2020 Round 1	Mount Sion	1–19 – 1–13	Clonea	Walsh Park
	A Gleeson 0–8, S Roche 1–1, E McGrath 0–4, M O'Neill 0–4, MF O'Neill 0–1, J Gleeson 0–1.		B Power 0–7, C Power 1–1, J Gleeson 0–3, M Power 0–1, S Clancy 0–1.

2 August 2020 Round 2	Roanmore	4–16 – 2–09	Clonea	Walsh Park
	B Nolan 1–8, E O'Toole 1–1, G O'Brien 0–4, E Madigan 1–0, S Nolan 1–0, C Dempsey 0–1, S Mackey 0–1, C Wadding 0–1.		B Power 0–6, S Clancy 1–1, S Curry 1–0, R Cahill 0–1, J Power 0–1.

9 August 2020 Round 3	Mount Sion	0–17 – 2–21	Roanmore	Walsh Park
	M O'Neill 0–11, S Roche 0–2, E McGrath 0–1, J Gleeson 0–1, M Gaffney 0–1, A Kirwan 0–1.		B Nolan 1–8, P O'Sullivan 0–6, S Nolan 1–1, S Mackey 0–2, G O'Brien 0–1, R Furlong 0–1, E O'Toole 0–1, C Wadding 0–1.

=== Group C ===
==== Table ====
Advance to quarter-finals

Team	Matches				Score			Pts
Team	Pld	W	D	L	For	Against	Diff	Pts
Lismore	2	2	0	0	8–40	4–39	13	4
Fourmilewater	2	1	0	1	0–41	3–39	−7	2
Dungarvan	2	0	0	2	5–36	6–39	−6	0

==== Results ====
26 July 2020 Round 1	Dungarvan	1–17 – 0–21	Fourmilewater	Fraher Field
	P Curran 0–12, G Crotty 1–0, D Lyons 0–3, J Nagle 0–1, J Allen 0–1.		A Ryan 0–9, J Barron 0–6, T Barron 0–3, S Ryan 0–2, D Murphy 0–1.

1 August 2020 Round 2	Lismore	2–22 – 0–20	Fourmilewater	Fraher Field
	M Shanahan 2–17, I Daly 0–1, P Prendergast 0–1, J Prendergast 0–1, R Barry 0–1, F Reeney 0–1.		A Ryan 0–9, J Barron 0–3, S Ryan 0–2, D Murphy 0–2, C Gleeson 0–1, T Guiry 0–1, T Barron 0–1, S Walsh 0–1.

9 August 2020 Round 3	Dungarvan	4–19 – 6–18	Lismore	Fraher Field
	J Burke 1–8, P Curran 2–4, C Curran 0–4, G Crotty 1–0, J Nagle 0–1, D Lyons 0–1, T Loftus 0–1.		R Barry 3–2, M Shanahan 0–10, O O'Gorman 2–0, J Prendergast 1–2, P Prendergast 0–2, F Reaney 0–2.

=== Group D ===
==== Table ====
Advance to quarter-finals

Team	Matches				Score			Pts
Team	Pld	W	D	L	For	Against	Diff	Pts
De La Salle	2	2	0	0	5–37	2–27	19	4
Abbeyside	2	1	0	1	3–38	4–21	14	2
Ballysaggart	2	0	0	2	2–18	4–45	−33	0

==== Results ====
25 July 2020 Round 1	De La Salle	2–22 – 1–12	Ballysaggart	Fraher Field
	J Fagan 1–13, E Meaney 1–0, T Douglas 0–2, R Halloran 0–2, C McCann 0–1, E Barrett 0–1, S Ryan 0–1, K Moran 0–1, A Farrell 0–1.		S Bennett 1–8, K Bennett 0–1, K Cashel 0–1, C O'Gorman 0–1, K Bennett 0–1.

1 August Round 2	Abbeyside	2–23 – 1–06	Ballysaggart	Fraher Field
	M Kiely 1–9, M Ferncombe 1–2, N Montgomery 0–4, M O'Halloran 0–3, P Hurney 0–2, T Looby 0–1, C Prunty 0–1, J Beresford 0–1.		S Bennett 0–5, K Cashel 1–0, E O'Brien 0–1.

8 August 2020 Round 3	De La Salle	3–15 – 1–15	Abbeyside	Walsh Park
	J Fagan 1–4, K Moran 1–1, S O'Brien 1–0, S Ryan 0–3, R Halloran 0–3, E Meaney 0–1, E Barrett 0–1, C McCann 0–1, T Douglas 0–1.		M Ferncombe 0–7, N Montgomery 1–2, M Kiely 0–4, P Hurney 0–1, M O'Halloran 0–1.

=== Knockout stage ===
==== Quarter-finals ====
15 August 2020 Quarter-final	Roanmore	0–13 – 1–14	Passage	Walsh Park
	B Nolan 0–8 (7fs, 1 65), G O’Brien 0–2, S Mackey, P O’Sullivan, E Power 0–1 each.	Report	M Cummins 0–5 (5fs), K Fitzgerald 0–4 (2fs), L Flynn 1–0, O Connors 0–2 (1f), Callum O’Neill, D Lynch, P Flynn 0–1 each.

15 August 2020 Quarter-final	Ballygunner	2–18 – 0–12	Fourmilewater	Fraher Field
	Pauric Mahony (1–9, 8fs), D Hutchinson (1–4), T O’Sullivan (0–3), K Mahony, T Foley (0–1 each).	Report	A Ryan (0–9, 7fs), S Ryan (0–2), S Walsh (0–1).

16 August 2020 Quarter-final	Mount Sion	3–18 – 2–17	De La Salle	Walsh Park
	Martin O’Neill 0–11 (6fs, 1 65), A Kirwan 2–0, S Roche 1–1, A Gleeson 0–4, M Gaffney 0–2.	Report	K Moran 1–2, J Fagan 0–5 (4fs, 1 65), R Halloran 1–0, E Barrett, E Meaney 0–3 each, S Ryan, T Douglas 0–2 each.

16 August 2020 Quarter-final	Lismore	2–22 – 3–11	Abbeyside	Fraher Field
	M Shanahan 1–11 (7fs), Oisin O’Gorman 1–5, F Reaney 0–2, I Daly, J Shanahan, Jack Prendergast, P Prendergast 0–1 each.	Report	M Ferncombe 2–8 (1–0 pen, 6fs), C Prunty 1–0, P Hurney, D McGrath, S Whelan Barrett 0–1 each.

==== Semi-finals ====
22 August 2020 Semi-final	Ballygunner	2–25 – 1–10	Lismore	Fraher Field
	D Hutchinson 2–8, Pauric Mahony 0–12 (9fs, 1 65), T O’Sullivan 0–2, P Leavy, C Sheahan, P Hogan 0–1 each.	Report	M Shanahan 0–6 (5fs), P Prendergast 1–0, J Shanahan 0–3, F Reaney 0–1.	Referee: M O'Brien

23 August 2020 Semi-final	Mount Sion	1–21 – 0–26	Passage	Walsh Park
	M Cummins (0–6 frees)(0–9); L Flynn (0–5); K Fitzgerald (0–4); J Whitty (0–3); O Connors (0–2); G Cullinane, A Roche, J Roche (0–1 each).	Report	Martin O’Neill (1 65, 0–10 frees)(0–11); A Gleeson (0–4), S Roche (1–1); Martin F O’Neill (0–2); M Gaffney, J Gleeson, L O’Brien (0–1 each).

==== Final ====
30 August 2020 Final	Ballygunner	1–23 – 0–09	Passage	Walsh Park
	Pauric Mahony (0–8, 5f), D Hutchinson (0–5), C Sheahan (0–2), P Hogan (0–4), K Mahony (1–3), C Power (0–1).	Report	M Cummins (0–6,4f), G Cullinane 0–1, L Flynn (0–1), J Burke (0–1).

== Championship statistics ==
=== Top scorers ===
Overall

Rank	Player	Club	Tally	Total	Matches	Average
1	Maurice Shanahan	Lismore	3–44	53	4	13.25
2	Pauric Mahony	Ballygunner	1–48	51	5	10.20
3	Dessie Hutchinson	Ballygunner	6–23	41	5	8.20
4	Martin O'Neill	Mount Sion	0–36	36	4	9.00
5	Mikey Cummins	Passage	0–34	34	5	6.80
6	Billy Nolan	Roanmore	2–24	30	3	10.00
7	Jack Fagan	De La Salle	2–22	28	3	9.33
8	Aaron Ryan	Fourmilewater	0–27	27	3	9.00
9	Mark Ferncombe	Abbeyside	3–17	26	3	8.66
10	Patrick Curran	Dungarvan	2–16	22	2	11.00

In a single game

Rank	Player	Club	Tally	Total	Opposition
1	Maurice Shanahan	Lismore	2–17	23	Fourmilewater
2	Jack Fagan	De La Salle	1–13	16	Ballysaggart
3	Mark Ferncombe	Abbeyside	2-08	14	Lismore
3	Dessie Hutchinson	Ballygunner	2-08	14	Lismore
3	Maurice Shanahan	Lismore	1–11	14	Abbeyside
4	Michael Kiely	Abbeyside	1-09	12	Ballysaggart
4	Pauric Mahony	Ballygunner	1-09	12	Fourmilewater
4	Patrick Curran	Dungarvan	0–12	12	Fourmilewater
4	Pauric Mahony	Ballygunner	0–12	12	Lismore
5	Ray Barry	Lismore	3-02	11	Dungarvan
5	Dessie Hutchinson	Ballygunner	2-05	11	Tallow
5	Billy Nolan	Roanmore	1-08	11	Clonea
5	Billy Nolan	Roanmore	1-08	11	Mount Sion
5	Johnny Burke	Dungarvan	1-08	11	Lismore
5	Stephen Bennett	Ballysaggart	1-08	11	De La Salle
5	Martin O'Neill	Mount Sion	0–11	11	Roanmore
5	Pauric Mahony	Ballygunner	0–11	11	Passage
5	Martin O'Neill	Mount Sion	0–11	11	De La Salle
5	Martin O'Neill	Mount Sion	0–11	11	Passage
