= 2021 Waterford Senior Hurling Championship =

Annual hurling competition season

- Dates: 28 August – 3 October 2021
- Teams: 13
- Sponsor: J. J. Kavanagh & Sons
- Champions: Ballygunner (20th title); Barry Coughlan (captain); Darragh O'Sullivan (manager)
- Runners-up: Roanmore; Gavin O'Brien (captain); Peter Queally (manager)
- Relegated: Ballyduff Upper; Ballysaggart

Tournament statistics
- Matches played: 24
- Goals scored: 73 (3.04 per match)
- Points scored: 867 (36.13 per match)
- Top scorer(s): Maurice Shanahan (7–43)

The 2021 Waterford Senior Hurling Championship was the 121st staging of the Waterford Senior Hurling Championship since its establishment by the Waterford County Board in 1897. The championship began on 28 August 2021 and ended on 3 October 2021.

Ballygunner were the defending champions. Ballyduff Upper and Ballysaggart were relegated from the championship after being beaten in a series of playoffs.

The final was played on 3 October 2021 at Walsh Park in Waterford, between Ballygunner and Roanmore, in what was their first ever meeting in a final. Ballygunner won the match by 2–27 to 0–13 to claim their 20th championship title overall and an eighth consecutive title.

Lismore's Maurice Shanahan was the championship's top scorer with 7–43.

== Team changes ==
=== To Championship ===
Promoted from the Waterford Intermediate Hurling Championship

- Ballyduff Upper

== Results ==
=== Group A ===
==== Group A table ====
Advance to quarter-finals Advance to relegation play-off

Team	Matches				Score			Pts
Team	Pld	W	D	L	For	Against	Diff	Pts
Lismore	3	2	0	1	7–59	2–63	11	4
Fourmilewater	3	2	0	1	1–60	3–50	4	4
Tallow	3	1	0	2	6–48	7–60	−14	2
Ballysaggart	3	1	0	2	4–61	6–56	−1	2

==== Group A results ====
29 August 2021 Round 1	Lismore	5–19 – 1–19	Tallow	Fraher Field
	M Shanahan 4–13,

29 August 2021 Round 1	Fourmilewater	1–19 – 1–17	Ballysaggart	Fraher Field
	A Ryan 0–11.		Stephen Bennett 0–11, C O'Gorman 1–1, Kieran Bennett 0–2, Cailean O'Gorman 0–1, Shane Bennett 0–1, Kyle Bennett 0–1.

4 September 2021 Round 2	Ballysaggart	2–22 – 4–17	Tallow	Fraher Field
	Stephen Bennett 1–11, Shane Bennett 1–1, Kieran Bennett 0–3, Kyle Bennett 0–2, C Murphy 0–1, S Mangan 0–1, R Walsh 0–1, K Cashel 0–1, S Ryan 0–1.		T Ryan 1–5, P O'Brien 1–2, R Grey 0–4, D Buckley 0–4, M Stewart 1–0, M O'Brien 1–0.

5 September 2021 Round 2	Lismore	1–20 – 0–22	Fourmilewater	Fraher Field
	M Shanahan 1–12, J Prendergast 0–2, R Barry 0–2, F Reaney 0–2, J Shanahan 0–1, D Prendergast 0–1.		A Ryan 0–8, D Ryan 0–4, T Guiry 0–3, D Guiry 0–3, J Barron 0–2, C Gleeson 0–1, S Walsh 0–1.

11 September 2021 Round 3	Fourmilewater	0–19 – 1–13	Tallow	Fraher Field
	J Barron 0–7, A Ryan 0–7, S Ryan 0–2, T Guiry 0–1, D Ryan 0–1, C Gleeson 0–1.		T Ryan 1–6, R Grey 0–3, R O'Sullivan 0–1, D Mulcahy 0–1, I Beecher 0–1, D Beecher 0–1.

11 September 2021 Round 3	Lismore	1–20 – 1–22	Ballysaggart	Fraher Field
	M Shanahan 1–9, J Shanahan 0–3, Jack Prendergast 0–3, John Prendergast 0–1, J Linehan 0–1, O O'Gorman 0–1, R Barry 0–1, J Heneghan 0–1.		Stephen Bennett 1–9, R Walsh 0–3, Kieran Bennett 0–2, Kyle Bennett 0–2, K Cashel 0–2, Shane Bennett 0–1, Cailean O'Gorman 0–1, Chris O'Gorman 0–1, E O'Brien 0–1.

=== Group B ===
==== Group B table ====
Advance to quarter-finals Advance to relegation play-off

Team	Matches				Score			Pts
Team	Pld	W	D	L	For	Against	Diff	Pts
Ballygunner	2	2	0	0	2–53	2–26	27	4
Abbeyside	2	1	0	1	4–37	1–31	15	2
Ballyduff Upper	2	0	0	2	1–19	4–52	−41	0

==== Group B results ====
28 August 2021 Round 1	Ballygunner	1–31 – 1–10	Ballyduff Upper	Fraher Field
	D Hutchinson 1–6,

5 September 2021 Round 2	Ballygunner	1–22 – 1–16	Abbeyside	Walsh Park
	H Ruddle 1–2, M Mahony 0–4, C Sheahan 0–3, P Hogan 0–3, K Mahony 0–3, P Mahony 0–3, B O'Keeffe 0–1, S O'Sullivan 0–1, B O'Sullivan 0–1, D Hutchinson 0–1.		N Montgomery 1–1, M O'Halloran 0–4, M Fercombe 0–2, W Beresford 0–2, J Elsted 0–2, M Kiely 0–2, S Whelan-Barrett 0–1, C Prunty 0–1, E Kiely 0–1.

12 September 2021 Round 3	Abbeyside	3–21 – 0–09	Ballyduff Upper	Fraher Field
	M Ferncombe 0–7, M Kiely 1–3, R Foley 1–0, J Elsted 1–0, N Montgomery 0–3, S Cliffe 0–3, W Beresford 0–2, D Montgomery 0–1, M O'Halloran 0–1, P Hurney 0–1.		A Casey 0–4, M Kearney 0–4, J Kearney 0–1.

=== Group C ===
==== Group C table ====
Advance to quarter-finals Advance to relegation play-off

Team	Matches				Score			Pts
Team	Pld	W	D	L	For	Against	Diff	Pts
Dungarvan	2	2	0	0	3–47	1–40	10	4
Mount Sion	2	1	0	1	2–43	1–41	8	2
De La Salle	2	0	0	2	1–30	4–39	−18	0

==== Group C results ====
28 August 2021 Round 1	De La Salle	1–16 – 2–20	Dungarvan	Fraher Field
	T Douglas 1–1, J Fagan 0–3, E Barrett 0–2, S Ryan 0–1, C McCann 0–1.		P Curran 1–12, C Curran 0–3, M Kiely 1–2, J Allen 0–1, D Lyons 0–1.

4 September 2021 Round 2	Mount Sion	2–19 – 0–14	De La Salle	Walsh Park
	M O'Neill 0–8, D Power 1–1, S Roche 1–1, A Gleeson 0–3, J Gleeson 0–2, A Kirwan 0–1, J Kennedy 0–1, P Penkert 0–1, O Whelan 0–1.		R Halloran 0–4, E Barrett 0–3, E Meaney 0–2, J Dillon 0–1, T Douglas 0–1, S Ryan 0–1, C McCann 0–1, S Carton 0–1.

12 September 2021 Round 3	Mount Sion	0–24 – 1–27	Dungarvan	Walsh Park
	M O'Neill 0–13, S Roche 0–3, J Gleeson 0–2, MF O'Neill 0–2, E McGrath 0–2, J Kennedy 0–1, A Kirwan 0–1.		P Curran 0–11, M Kiely 1–2, C Curran 0–5, G Crotty 0–4, K Daly 0–1, J Burke 0–1, C Curran 0–1, G Power 0–1, T Loftus 0–1.

=== Group D ===
==== Group D table ====
Advance to quarter-finals Advance to relegation play-off

Team	Matches				Score			Pts
Team	Pld	W	D	L	For	Against	Diff	Pts
Passage	2	2	0	0	6–31	1–33	13	4
Ronamore	2	1	0	1	1–38	3–31	1	2
Clonea	2	0	0	2	1–30	4–35	−14	0

==== Group D results ====
29 August 2021 Round 1	Passage	3–16 – 0–18	Roanmore	Walsh Park
	M Fitzgerald 2–3,

5 September 2021 Round 2	Roanmore	1–20 – 0–15	Clonea	Walsh Park
	G O'Brien 0–9, S Mackey 1–0, B Nolan 0–3, L Hearne 0–3, E O'Toole 0–2, E Flynn 0–1, C Dempsey 0–1, P O'Sullivan 0–1.		J Gleeson 0–11, M Curry 0–1, C Dalton 0–1, W Hahessy 0–1, B Power 0–1.

11 September 2021 Round 3	Clonea	1–15 – 3–15	Passage	Walsh Park
	B Power 0–14, J Power 1–0, C Kirwan 0–1.		T Connors 2–0, M Cummins 0–5, K Fitzgerald 0–5, M Fitzgerald 1–0, O Connors 0–3, S Lynch 0–1, D Lynch 0–1.

=== Knockout stage ===
==== Relegation playoffs ====
25 September 2021 Playoff	Ballyduff Upper	0–14 – 2–23	Clonea	Fraher Field
	E Murray 0–6, M Kearney 0–5, T Flynn 0–2, K Casey 0–1.		B Power 1–6, C Kirwan 1–4, F Roche 0–4, J Gleeson 0–3, M Curry 0–2, M Power 0–1, R Flynn 0–1, S Clancy 0–1, J Power 0–1.

2 October 2021 Playoff	Ballysaggart	3–11 – 4–23	De La Salle	Fraher Field
	Stephen Bennett (1–8, 5fs), Eugene O'Brien, Shane Bennett (1–0 each), R Bennett, Chris O'Gorman, S Mangan (0–1 each).	Report	R Halloran (1–11, 6fs), C McCann (1–2), E Meaney (0–4), S O'Brien, P Nevin (1–0 each), S McNulty (0–2, 1f), S Ryan, E Barrett, J Fagan, T Douglas (0–1 each).

==== Quarter-finals ====
18 September 2021 Quarter-final	Ballygunner	1–23 – 1–15	Fourmilewater	Fraher Field
	P Mahony 0–9, K Mahony 1–3, P Hogan 0–3, D Hutchinson 0–3, C Sheehan 0–3, M Mahony 0–1, B O'Sullivan 0–1.		A Ryan 0–5, S Boyce 1–0, J Barron 0–3, D Guiry 0–2, C Gleeson 0–2, T Guiry 0–1, S Ryan 0–1, S Walsh 0–1.

18 September 2021 Quarter-final	Passage	3–15 – 2–19	Mount Sion	Walsh Park
	M Cummins 1–10, K Fitzgerald 1–2, L Flynn 1–1, G Cullinane 0–1, M Fitzgerald 0–1.		A Gleeson 2–4, M O'Neill 0–8, S Roche 0–3, O Whelan 0–2, L O'Brien 0–1, D Butler 0–1.

18 September 2021 Quarter-final	Lismore	4–13 – 4–14	Roanmore	Fraher Field
	M Shanahan 1–9, R Barry 3–1, C Daly 0–2, F Reaney 0–1.		G O'Brien 2–8, E Flynn 1–0, S Mackey 1–0, B Nolan 0–2, C Dempsey 0–1, R Furlong 0–1, E O'Toole 0–1, P O'Sullivan 0–1.

19 September 2021 Quarter-final	Dungarvan	5–16 – 1–18	Abbeyside	Fraher Field
	P Curran 2–10, M Kiely 3–2, G Crotty 0–2, D Lyons 0–1, C Curran 0–1.		M Ferncombe 0–7, P Hurney 1–1, M O'Halloran 0–3, M Kiely 0–3, D Collins 0–2, J Elsted 0–1, R Foley 0–1.

==== Semi-finals ====
25 September 2021 Semi-final	Ballygunner	0–21 – 1–16	Mount Sion	Walsh Park
	P Mahony 0–8 (8fs), D Hutchinson, P Hogan 0–4 each, H Ruddle, M Mahony 0–2, S O’Sullivan 0–1.	Report	M O’Neill 0–9 (7fs), A Gleeson 1–4 (1–0 pen, 3fs), D Butler, MF O’Neill, S Roche 0–1 each.

26 September 2021 Semi-final	Dungarvan	0–12 – 1–15	Roanmore	Walsh Park
	P Curran 0–5 (0-4f), C Curran 0–3, M Kiely 0–2, C Curran, J Burke 0–1 each.	Report	G O’Brien 0–11 (0-8f), E O’Toole 1–0, S Mackey 0–2, S Burke, E Madigan 0–1 each.

==== Final ====
3 October 2021 Final	Ballygunner	2–27 – 0–13	Roanmore	Walsh Park
	D Hutchinson 1–9, P Mahony 0–9 (5fs), C Power 1–0, P Hogan, M Mahony, J Foley 0–2 each, K Mahony, H Ruddle, C Power 0–1 each.	Report	G O’Brien 0–7 (6fs, 1 65), L Hearne 0–2, S Burke, C Dempsey, Brian Nolan, Billy Nolan 0–1 each.	Referee: T Walsh

== Championship statistics ==
=== Top scorers ===
In a single game

Rank	Player	Club	Tally	Total	Opposition
1	Maurice Shanahan	Lismore	4–13	25	Tallow
2	Patrick Curran	Dungarvan	2–10	16	Abbeyside
3	Maurice Shanahan	Lismore	1–12	15	Fourmilewater
3	Patrick Curran	Dungarvan	1–12	15	De La Salle
5	Gavin O'Brien	Roanmore	2-08	14	Lismore
5	Stephen Bennett	Ballysaggart	1–11	14	Tallow
5	Reuben Halloran	De La Salle	1–11	14	Ballysaggart
5	Billy Power	Clonea	0–14	14	Passage
9	Mikey Cummins	Passage	1–10	13	Mount Sion
9	Martin O'Neill	Mount Sion	0–13	13	Dungarvan

=== Miscellaneous ===
- The relegation play-off between De La Salle and Ballysaggart was called off at the last minute because of a floodlight failure at Fraher Field.
- Roanmore qualified for the final for the first time since 1990.
