= Ballygunner =

Civil parish in County Waterford, Ireland

Ballygunner Baile Gunnair
- Civil Parish
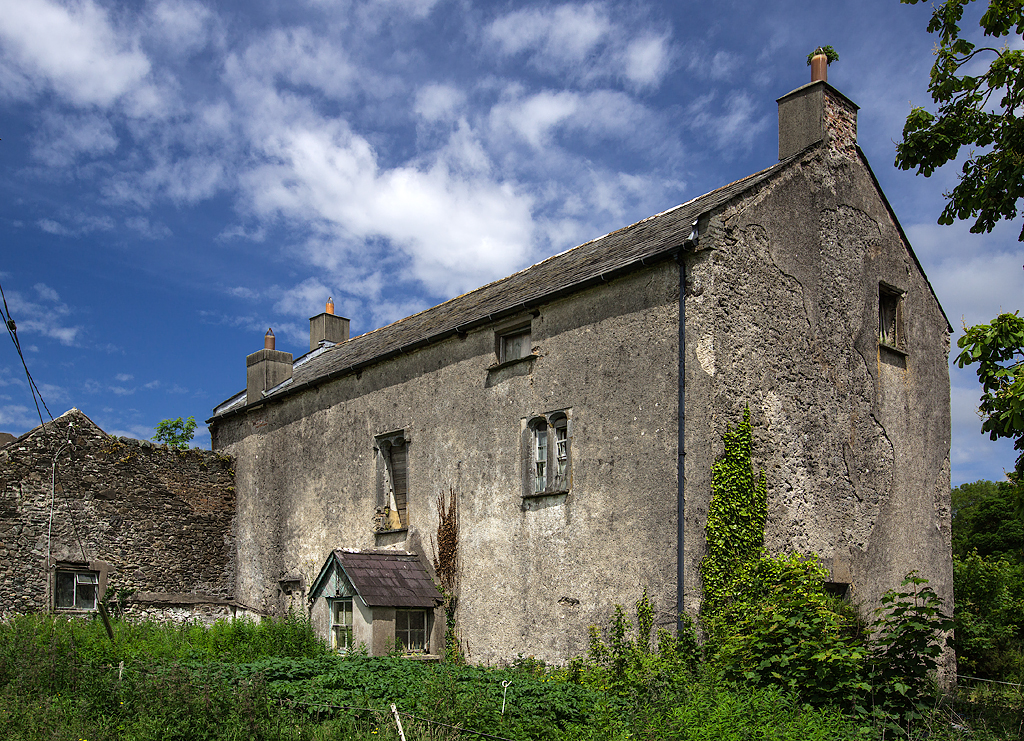
- Ballygunner Castle is a 17th-century house that incorporates elements of an earlier castle

- Location in Ireland
- Coordinates: 52°13′15″N 7°03′07″W
- Country: Ireland
- Province: Munster
- County: Waterford

Ballygunner (Irish: Baile Gunnair) is a civil parish in County Waterford, Ireland. It lies on the southern outskirts of Waterford city.

The placename is derived, in part, from the Old Norse masculine personal name Gunnarr.

The civil parish of Ballygunner contains several townlands, including Ballygunnercastle, Ballygunnertemple, Ballygunnermore, Ballymaclode, Callaghane and Knockboy. Ballygunner Castle, a 17th-century country house that incorporates elements of an earlier castle, is located in Ballygunnercastle townland.

Amenities within the parish include the local hurling club Ballygunner GAA, the adjacent St. Mary's National School and the 19th/29th Waterford St Mary's Ballygunner Scout Group.
