= Kinnatalloon =

Barony in County Cork, Ireland

Kinnatalloon Coill na Talún (Irish)
- Barony
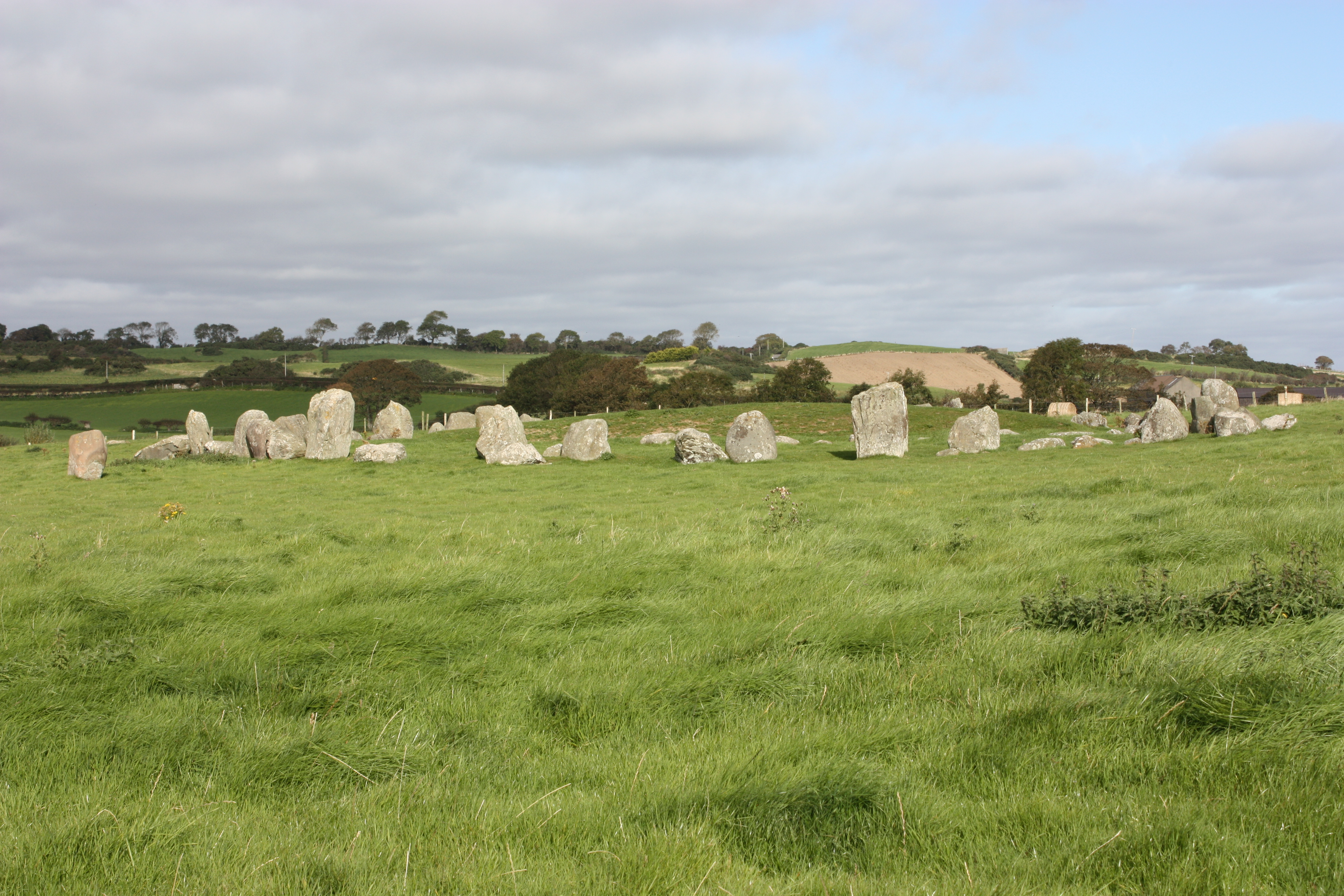
- Stone circle at Ballynoe

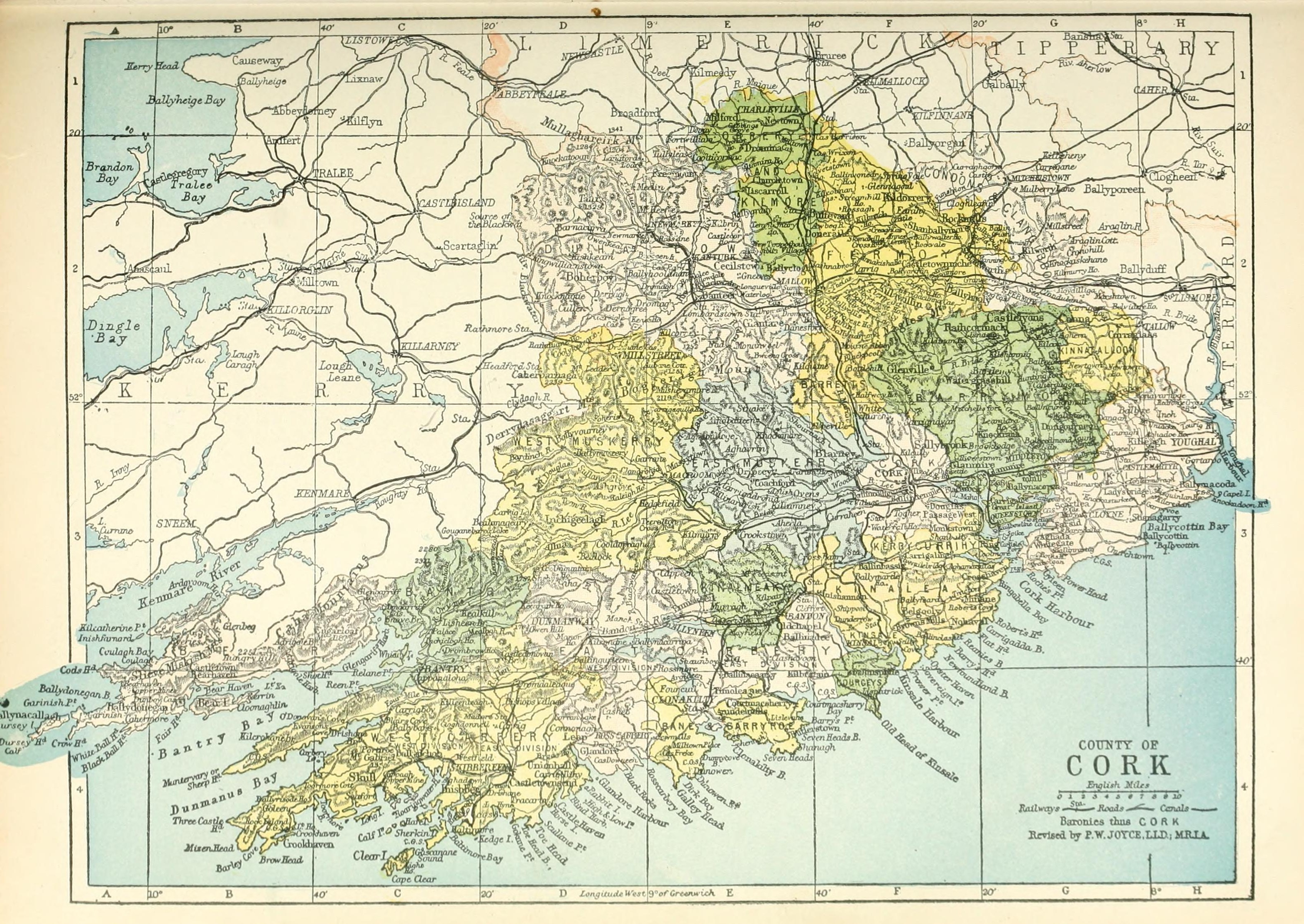
- Barony map of County Cork, 1900; Kinnatalloon barony is in the east, coloured yellow.

- Location within County Cork
- Coordinates: 52°04′N 8°04′W
- Sovereign state: Ireland
- Province: Munster
- County: Cork

Area
  - Total: 112.2 km^{2} (43.3 sq mi)

Kinnatalloon (Irish: Coill na Talún) is a historical barony in east County Cork, Ireland.

Baronies were mainly cadastral rather than administrative units. They acquired modest local taxation and spending functions in the 19th century before being superseded by the Local Government (Ireland) Act 1898.

== History and legend ==
The current Irish name means "forest of the land," but this is a corruption. The original name is thought to have been Cenél Tolamnach ("Tolamhnach's kind"), a tribal name referring to Tolamhnach, a chief of the Uí Liatháin people who died at the Battle of Carn Conaill near Gort in AD 649.

The ancient kingdom of Uí Liatháin consisted of Kinnatalloon and part of Barrymore barony. In the mid-18th century the common surnames in Kinnatalloon were Keeffe, Ahern, Carthy, Cotter, Daly, Fitzgerald, Geiry, Lyne, Quirk and Walsh.

== Geography ==
Kinnatalloon is in the east of the county, chiefly between the Tourig River and River Bride, bordering on County Waterford to its east.

== List of settlements ==
Settlements within the historical barony of Kinnatalloon include:

- Ballynoe
- Conna

== See also ==
- List of townlands of the barony of Kinnatalloon
