= Barrymore (disambiguation) =

Barrymore is a surname.

Barrymore may also refer to:

- Barrymore family, an American acting family
- Barrymore (barony), a barony in County Cork in Ireland
- Earl of Barrymore, a title in the Peerage of Ireland
- Barrymore (play), a 1996 play by William Luce
- Barrymore (TV series), a British light entertainment show
- Barrymore (film), a 2011 Canadian drama film
