= Waterrock =

Waterrock may refer to:

- Water-rock, a townland in County Cork, Ireland
- Waterrock Knob, a mountain in North Carolina, United States
