= Henry Woodroffe =

Anglican priest

Henry Joseph Woodroffe was an Anglican priest in Ireland in the second half of the 19th century.

Woodroffe was educated at Trinity College, Dublin. and ordained in 1870. After curacies in Boyle, Carrigaline and Queenstown (now called Cobh), he wheld incumbencies at Ballynoe, Aghern and Lislee. He was Archdeacon of Ross from 1883 to 1889.
