= Conna Castle =

16th century castle in Cork, Ireland

- Caisleán Chonaithe (Irish)
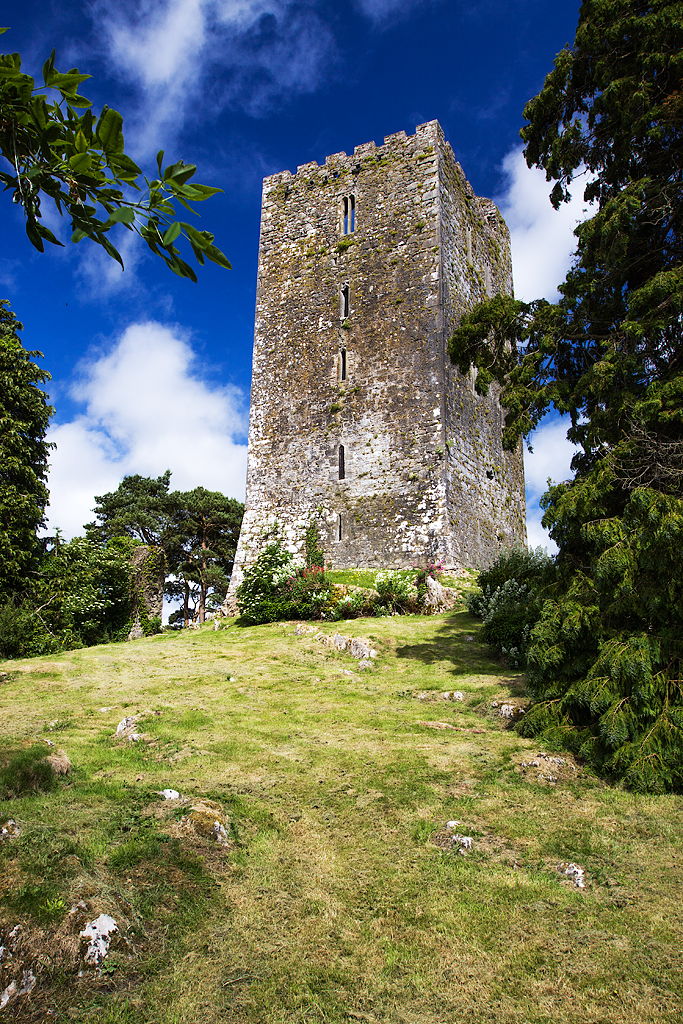
- Interactive map of Conna Castle
- 52.0944°N 8.1017°W

History
- Built: 1560–1561

National monument of Ireland
- Official name: Conna Castle
- Reference no.: 240

Conna Castle (Irish: Caisleán Chonaithe) is a 16th century tower house located near Conna in County Cork, Ireland.

== History ==
=== 16th century ===
Conna Castle is situated in County Cork on the River Bride, a tributary of the River Blackwater, roughly six miles west of Tallow, County Waterford. It was erected on land owned by the Earls of Desmond, which they acquired in the 1460s. The land was granted to Thomas Ruadh fitz James FitzGerald, the illegitimised son of James fitzGerald, the 13th Earl of Desmond. Though it appears to be of 14th or 15th century construction, in reality it was built by Thomas Ruadh in the mid-sixteenth century, likely between 1560 and 1561. James fitzThomas fitzGerald, known as the Súgán Earl, was the last of the fitzGerald's to reside in Conna Castle. James fitzThomas briefly took a leading role in the Nine Years War, before being captured and imprisoned in the Tower of London, which marked the end of the reign of the Earls of Desmond.

=== 17th century ===
The castle was captured by James Tuchet, the 3rd Earl of Castlehaven in 1645. In 1653, the castle was burned in an accidental fire.

=== 19th century ===
The castle entered state care in the 19th century. It's donation to the Local Government Board of Ireland by Alfred G.K. L'Estrange was the first bequest of its kind in the history of the state.

=== 20th century – present ===
During the 1980s and 1990s, Conna Castle was used as an outdoor concert venue. The castle was closed to the public by the Office of Public Works in 2015 to carry out restorative works, and it remains closed as of March 2022. Local politicians have spoken out against the length of the closure.

== Architecture ==
Conna castle is a tower house style castle. It is five storeys tall, and largely intact. To the northwest of the castle stand the remains of a corner tower and a bawn.
