= Fartha, County Cork =

Fartha Irish: Feartaigh
- Townland
- Fartha shown within Ireland
- Coordinates: 51°45′30″N 08°27′03″W
- Country: Ireland
- County: County Cork
- Barony: Kinalea
- Civil parish: Ballyfeard

Area
  - Total: 212 ha (525 acres)

Fartha (Irish: Feartaigh) is a small townland in south County Cork, Ireland. Located in the civil parish of Ballyfeard, Fartha is 525 acres (2.12 km^{2}) in area. It had a population of 55 people as of the 2011 census.

The townland's name derives from the Irish fearta meaning "grave" or "mound", and may relate to nearby burial places, tombs or graves.

Fartha is home to the Joseph Walsh furniture studio.

== See also ==
- Belgooly
- Riverstick
- List of townlands of the Barony of Kinalea
