= List of townlands of the barony of Barrymore =

This is a sortable table of the townlands in the barony of Barrymore, County Cork, Ireland. Duplicate names occur where there is more than one townland with the same name in the barony, and also where a townland is known by two alternative names. Names marked in bold typeface are towns and villages, and the word Town appears for those entries in the area column.

== Townland list ==
Townland	Area (acres)	Barony	Civil parish	Poor law union
Acres	36	Barrymore	Templenacarriga	Midleton
Aghaduff	148	Barrymore	Kilquane	Cork
Anngrove	297	Barrymore	Carrigtohill	Midleton
Ardarou	369	Barrymore	Ardnageehy	Fermoy
Ardnageehy East	698	Barrymore	Ardnageehy	Fermoy
Ardnageehy West	477	Barrymore	Ardnageehy	Fermoy
Ardra	390	Barrymore	Britway	Fermoy
Ashgrove	177	Barrymore	Templerobin	Cork
Aughnalyra	61	Barrymore	Clonmult	Midleton
Aunamihoonagh	88	Barrymore	Rathcormack	Fermoy
Ballaheen	332	Barrymore	Britway	Midleton
Ballinaltig	316	Barrymore	Kilshanahan	Fermoy
Ballinbrittig	924	Barrymore	Carrigtohill	Midleton
Ballincurrig	418	Barrymore	Templebodan	Midleton
Ballindeenisk	645	Barrymore	Templeusque	Cork
Ballinglanna	608	Barrymore	Caherlag	Cork
Ballingohig	387	Barrymore	Killaspugmullane	Cork
Ballinlegane	631	Barrymore	Ardnageehy	Cork
Ballinterry	311	Barrymore	Gortroe	Fermoy
Ballintubbrid East	391	Barrymore	Mogeesha	Midleton
Ballintubbrid West	367	Barrymore	Mogeesha	Midleton
Ballinure	304	Barrymore	Gortroe	Fermoy
Ballinvarrig East	21	Barrymore	Gortroe	Fermoy
Ballinvarrig West	196	Barrymore	Gortroe	Fermoy
Ballinvinny North	265	Barrymore	Killaspugmullane	Cork
Ballinvinny South	325	Barrymore	Killaspugmullane	Cork
Ballinwillin	351	Barrymore	Gortroe	Fermoy
Ballyadam	256	Barrymore	Carrigtohill	Midleton
Ballyannan	363	Barrymore	Mogeesha	Midleton
Ballyard	207	Barrymore	Britway	Midleton
Ballyard	349	Barrymore	Clonmult	Midleton
Ballyarra	744	Barrymore	Castlelyons	Fermoy
Ballybrack	1,127	Barrymore	Dunbulloge	Cork
Ballybrassil	222	Barrymore	Templerobin	Cork
Ballybrowney Lower	179	Barrymore	Rathcormack	Fermoy
Ballybrowney Upper	166	Barrymore	Rathcormack	Fermoy
Ballybrowney-mountain	240	Barrymore	Rathcormack	Fermoy
Ballycaskin	230	Barrymore	Whitechurch	Cork
Ballycurrany East	175	Barrymore	Ballycurrany	Midleton
Ballycurrany West	244	Barrymore	Ballycurrany	Midleton
Ballycurreen	375	Barrymore	Carrigtohill	Midleton
Ballyda	287	Barrymore	Gortroe	Fermoy
Ballydaniel Beg	80	Barrymore	Templerobin	Cork
Ballydaniel More	367	Barrymore	Templerobin	Cork
Ballydaw	123	Barrymore	Knockmourne	Fermoy
Ballydaw	55	Barrymore	Britway	Fermoy
Ballydonagh Beg	177	Barrymore	Dungourney	Midleton
Ballydonagh More	438	Barrymore	Dungourney	Midleton
Ballydulea	146	Barrymore	Templerobin	Cork
Ballyedmond	236	Barrymore	Templenacarriga	Midleton
Ballyedmond Little	162	Barrymore	Templenacarriga	Midleton
Ballyeightragh	306	Barrymore	Clonmult	Midleton
Ballyellane	169	Barrymore	Templerobin	Cork
Ballyerra	299	Barrymore	Templebodan	Midleton
Ballyglissane	203	Barrymore	Rathcormack	Fermoy
Ballyhamsherry	383	Barrymore	Castlelyons	Fermoy
Ballyhennick	220	Barrymore	Caherlag	Cork
Ballyhetterick	15	Barrymore	Clonmel	Cork
Ballyleagh	118	Barrymore	Lisgoold	Midleton
Ballyleary	158	Barrymore	Carrigtohill	Midleton
Ballyleary	332	Barrymore	Clonmel	Cork
Ballyloohane	29	Barrymore	Kilquane	Cork
Ballymacsliney	341	Barrymore	Templenacarriga	Midleton
Ballymartin	569	Barrymore	Dungourney	Midleton
Ballymore	343	Barrymore	Templerobin	Cork
Ballymurphy Lower	194	Barrymore	Knockmourne	Fermoy
Ballymurphy Upper	332	Barrymore	Knockmourne	Fermoy
Ballynabointra	338	Barrymore	Carrigtohill	Midleton
Ballynabortag	1,003	Barrymore	Dunbulloge	Cork
Ballynabrannagh East	225	Barrymore	Ballycurrany	Midleton
Ballynabrannagh West	89	Barrymore	Ballycurrany	Midleton
Ballynaclashy	406	Barrymore	Ballycurrany	Midleton
Ballynacole	320	Barrymore	Dungourney	Midleton
Ballynacrusha	380	Barrymore	Clonmel	Cork
Ballynagarbragh	232	Barrymore	Caherlag	Cork
Ballynagaul	129	Barrymore	Dungourney	Midleton
Ballynagaul	305	Barrymore	Kilquane	Cork
Ballynaglogh	164	Barrymore	Ballycurrany	Midleton
Ballynaglogh East	808	Barrymore	Dunbulloge	Cork
Ballynaglogh West	883	Barrymore	Dunbulloge	Cork
Ballynagore	83	Barrymore	Rathcormack	Fermoy
Ballynahina	890	Barrymore	Rathcormack	Fermoy
Ballynakilla	227	Barrymore	Gortroe	Fermoy
Ballynakilla	509	Barrymore	Ballycurrany	Midleton
Ballynamaddree	470	Barrymore	St. Michael's	Cork
Ballynanelagh	241	Barrymore	Gortroe	Fermoy
Ballynanelagh	433	Barrymore	Kilquane	Cork
Ballynaparson	283	Barrymore	Templeusque	Cork
Ballynaroon	194	Barrymore	Caherlag	Cork
Ballynaskeha	186	Barrymore	Lisgoold	Midleton
Ballynatra	83	Barrymore	Templerobin	Cork
Ballynella	169	Barrymore	Knockmourne	Fermoy
Ballynoe	237	Barrymore	Gortroe	Fermoy
Ballynoe	254	Barrymore	Clonmel	Cork
Ballynona North	1,215	Barrymore	Dungourney	Midleton
Ballynona South	410	Barrymore	Dungourney	Midleton
Ballyogaha East	81	Barrymore	Gortroe	Fermoy
Ballyogaha North	79	Barrymore	Gortroe	Fermoy
Ballyogaha West	607	Barrymore	Gortroe	Fermoy
Ballyoneen	108	Barrymore	Templebodan	Midleton
Ballyoneen	171	Barrymore	Gortroe	Fermoy
Ballyoran	575	Barrymore	Castlelyons	Fermoy
Ballyready	383	Barrymore	Rathcormack	Fermoy
Ballyreardon	57	Barrymore	Templenacarriga	Midleton
Ballyregan	207	Barrymore	Carrigtohill	Midleton
Ballyrichard	107	Barrymore	Carrigtohill	Midleton
Ballyrichard	485	Barrymore	Carrigtohill	Midleton
Ballyrobert	133	Barrymore	Knockmourne	Fermoy
Ballyrobert	169	Barrymore	Castlelyons	Fermoy
Ballyrobert	28	Barrymore	Templebodan	Midleton
Ballyrobert	374	Barrymore	Gortroe	Fermoy
Ballysallagh	198	Barrymore	Lisgoold	Midleton
Ballyskerdane	162	Barrymore	St. Michael's	Cork
Ballyspillane	325	Barrymore	Ballyspillane	Midleton
Ballyspillane	455	Barrymore	Ballyspillane	Midleton
Ballythomas	128	Barrymore	St. Michael's	Cork
Ballytrasna	297	Barrymore	Templenacarriga	Midleton
Ballytrasna	382	Barrymore	Little Island	Cork
Ballytrasna	419	Barrymore	Castlelyons	Fermoy
Ballyvatta	575	Barrymore	Ballycurrany	Middleton
Ballyvisteale	250	Barrymore	Ballydeloher	Cork
Ballyvisteale Demesne	55	Barrymore	Ballydeloher	Cork
Ballyvodock East	533	Barrymore	Mogeesha	Midleton
Ballyvodock West	399	Barrymore	Mogeesha	Midleton
Ballyvolane	361	Barrymore	Britway	Fermoy
Ballyvoloon	265	Barrymore	Clonmel	Cork
Ballyvorisheen East	367	Barrymore	Dunbulloge	Cork
Ballyvorisheen West	592	Barrymore	Dunbulloge	Cork
Ballywilliam	156	Barrymore	Templerobin	Cork
Baneena North	100	Barrymore	Gortroe	Fermoy
Baneena South	116	Barrymore	Gortroe	Fermoy
Baneshane	249	Barrymore	Mogeesha	Midleton
Barnashillane	78	Barrymore	Ballyspillane	Midleton
Barnetstown	360	Barrymore	Kilquane	Cork
Barrafohona	967	Barrymore	Britway	Midleton
Barranahash	290	Barrymore	Rathcormack	Fermoy
Barryscourt	699	Barrymore	Carrigtohill	Midleton
Behernagh Lower	89	Barrymore	Rathcormack	Fermoy
Behernagh Upper	186	Barrymore	Rathcormack	Fermoy
Belgrove	334	Barrymore	Templerobin	Cork
Belvelly	417	Barrymore	Clonmel	Cork
Bilberry	609	Barrymore	Inchinabacky	Middleton
Bishop's Island	19	Barrymore	Kilquane	Cork
Bishops-island	587	Barrymore	Ardnageehy	Fermoy
Blossomgrove	409	Barrymore	Ballydeloher	Cork
Boherard	301	Barrymore	Dunbulloge	Cork
**Bridebridge**	Town	Barrymore	Castlelyons	Fermoy
Bridestown	905	Barrymore	Ardnageehy	Fermoy
Bridgeland East	44	Barrymore	Rathcormack	Fermoy
Bridgeland West	46	Barrymore	Rathcormack	Fermoy
Britway	225	Barrymore	Britway	Fermoy
Brookhill	60	Barrymore	Ballydeloher	Cork
**Brooklodge**	Town	Barrymore	Ballydeloher	Cork
Brooklodge	475	Barrymore	Ballydeloher	Cork
Brooklodge Lower	70	Barrymore	Ballydeloher	Cork
Brooklodge Upper	348	Barrymore	Ballydeloher	Cork
Brookville	117	Barrymore	Ballydeloher	Cork
Brown Island	8	Barrymore	Carrigtohill	Midleton
Bunaglanna	247	Barrymore	Ardnageehy	Fermoy
Burgesland	117	Barrymore	Carrigtohill	Midleton
Busypark	296	Barrymore	Kilshanahan	Fermoy
Butlerstown Great	245	Barrymore	Ballydeloher	Cork
Butlerstown Little	124	Barrymore	Ballydeloher	Cork
Caherdesert	235	Barrymore	Gortroe	Fermoy
Caherduggan	115	Barrymore	Gortroe	Fermoy
Caherduggan Demesne	149	Barrymore	Templebodan	Midleton
Caherduggan East	59	Barrymore	Templebodan	Midleton
Caherduggan West	104	Barrymore	Templebodan	Midleton
Calehane	135	Barrymore	Ballydeloher	Cork
Carhoo	97	Barrymore	Carrigtohill	Midleton
Carrig	325	Barrymore	Ardnageehy	Fermoy
**Carrigaloe**	Town	Barrymore	Clonmel	Cork
Carrigane	188	Barrymore	Lisgoold	Midleton
Carrigane	432	Barrymore	Carrigtohill	Midleton
Carrignafoy	328	Barrymore	Templerobin	Cork
**Carrignavar**	Town	Barrymore	Dunbulloge	Cork
Carrignavar	372	Barrymore	Dunbulloge	Cork
Carrigogna	272	Barrymore	Templenacarriga	Midleton
Carrigprenan	80	Barrymore	Little Island	Cork
**Carrigtohill**	Town	Barrymore	Carrigtohill	Midleton
Carrigtohill	566	Barrymore	Carrigtohill	Midleton
**Castlelyons**	Town	Barrymore	Castlelyons	Fermoy
Castlequarter	311	Barrymore	Dungourney	Midleton
Castleview	122	Barrymore	Little Island	Cork
Chimneyfield	141	Barrymore	Ardnageehy	Fermoy
Churchtown	105	Barrymore	Inchinabacky	Midleton
Clash	97	Barrymore	Kilquane	Cork
Clash East	144	Barrymore	Lisgoold	Midleton
Clash East	49	Barrymore	Ballycurrany	Midleton
Clash West	101	Barrymore	Lisgoold	Midleton
Clash West	27	Barrymore	Ballycurrany	Midleton
**Clashavodig**	Town	Barrymore	Little Island	Cork
Clashduff	237	Barrymore	Inchinabacky	Midleton
Cloneen	676	Barrymore	Carrigtohill	Midleton
**Clonmult**	Town	Barrymore	Clonmult	Midleton
**Clonmult**	Town	Barrymore	Dungourney	Midleton
Clonmult	466	Barrymore	Clonmult	Midleton
Cloyne (or Land of Dean & Chapter)	30	Barrymore	Clonmel	Cork
Clyduff	111	Barrymore	Carrigtohill	Midleton
Clykeel North	250	Barrymore	Gortroe	Fermoy
Clykeel South	92	Barrymore	Gortroe	Fermoy
Commons	389	Barrymore	Ardnageehy	Fermoy
Commons	9	Barrymore	Gortroe	Fermoy
Condonstown	431	Barrymore	Clonmult	Midleton
Condonstown	71	Barrymore	Ballycurrany	Midleton
Condonstown North	547	Barrymore	Kilshanahan	Fermoy
Condonstown South	512	Barrymore	Kilshanahan	Fermoy
Coney Island (or Rat Island)	1	Barrymore	Templerobin	Cork
Coneybeg	449	Barrymore	Templeusque	Cork
Coole Lower	606	Barrymore	Coole	Fermoy
Coole Upper	546	Barrymore	Coole	Fermoy
Coolea	218	Barrymore	Rathcormack	Fermoy
Coolgreen	481	Barrymore	Templeusque	Cork
Coolguerisk	300	Barrymore	Kilquane	Cork
Coolknedane North	116	Barrymore	Britway	Midleton
Coolknedane South	67	Barrymore	Britway	Midleton
Coolnacaha	132	Barrymore	Killaspugmullane	Cork
Coolnakilla	1,155	Barrymore	Rathcormack	Fermoy
Coolquane	459	Barrymore	Kilshanahan	Fermoy
Coom (Fitzgerald)	385	Barrymore	Dunbulloge	Cork
Coom (Hudson)	821	Barrymore	Dunbulloge	Cork
Coom (Midleton)	197	Barrymore	Dunbulloge	Cork
Coom	882	Barrymore	Dunbulloge	Cork
Coom East	267	Barrymore	Dunbulloge	Cork
Coom West	194	Barrymore	Dunbulloge	Cork
Coosane	331	Barrymore	Kilshanahan	Fermoy
Corbally	224	Barrymore	Dungourney	Midleton
Corbally	435	Barrymore	Ardnageehy	Fermoy
Corbally North	338	Barrymore	Lisgoold	Midleton
Corbally North	69	Barrymore	Ballydeloher	Cork
Corbally South	155	Barrymore	Ballydeloher	Cork
Corbally South	236	Barrymore	Lisgoold	Midleton
Corballybane	241	Barrymore	Lisgoold	Midleton
Corrin	714	Barrymore	Castlelyons	Fermoy
Cottstown	198	Barrymore	Dungourney	Midleton
Courtstown	574	Barrymore	Little Island	Cork
Cronvan	195	Barrymore	Gortroe	Fermoy
Crushiriree	334	Barrymore	Templeusque	Cork
Currabally	210	Barrymore	Templerobin	Cork
Curragh	585	Barrymore	Carrigtohill	Midleton
Curraghard	106	Barrymore	Gortroe	Fermoy
Curraghcondon	158	Barrymore	Templenacarriga	Midleton
Curraghdermot	719	Barrymore	Britway	Midleton
Curraghphlibbode	98	Barrymore	Gortroe	Fermoy
Curraghprevin	503	Barrymore	Rathcormack	Fermoy
Curraghteemore	120	Barrymore	Rathcormack	Fermoy
Cuskinny	91	Barrymore	Templerobin	Cork
Dean and Chapter Land of Cloyne	30	Barrymore	Clonmel	Cork
Deerpark	336	Barrymore	Castlelyons	Fermoy
Desert	296	Barrymore	Gortroe	Fermoy
Donegal	127	Barrymore	Clonmel	Cork
Dooneen	185	Barrymore	Ballycurrany	Midleton
Doonpeter	556	Barrymore	Dunbulloge	Cork
Dromboy North	197	Barrymore	Dunbulloge	Cork
Dromboy South	544	Barrymore	Dunbulloge	Cork
Dromruagh	26	Barrymore	Rathcormack	Fermoy
Dunbulloge	518	Barrymore	Dunbulloge	Cork
Dundellerick East	390	Barrymore	Templebodan	Midleton
Dundellerick West	146	Barrymore	Templebodan	Midleton
**Dungourney**	Town	Barrymore	Dungourney	Midleton
Dungourney	303	Barrymore	Dungourney	Midleton
Dunkettle	413	Barrymore	Caherlag	Cork
Elfordstown	218	Barrymore	Ballyspillane	Midleton
Fahydorgan	147	Barrymore	Carrigtohill	Midleton
Fanick	86	Barrymore	Templerobin	Cork
Farran North	80	Barrymore	Castlelyons	Fermoy
Farran South	127	Barrymore	Castlelyons	Fermoy
Foaty	221	Barrymore	Carrigtohill	Cork
Foaty	544	Barrymore	Clonmel	Cork
Forest-town	124	Barrymore	Carrigtohill	Midleton
Garrancloyne	170	Barrymore	Carrigtohill	Midleton
Garranes	295	Barrymore	Carrigtohill	Midleton
Garryantaggart	106	Barrymore	Gortroe	Fermoy
Garryduff	233	Barrymore	Mogeesha	Midleton
Garrylaurence	800	Barrymore	Clonmult	Midleton
Garrynacole	116	Barrymore	Rathcormack	Fermoy
Gearagh	167	Barrymore	Rathcormack	Fermoy
Glanakip	678	Barrymore	Rathcormack	Fermoy
Glannagaul	1,320	Barrymore	Rathcormack	Fermoy
Glannasack	485	Barrymore	Ardnageehy	Fermoy
Glanreagh	23	Barrymore	Rathcormack	Fermoy
Glashaboy East	832	Barrymore	Dunbulloge	Cork
Glashaboy North	1,660	Barrymore	Dunbulloge	Cork
Glashaboy South	693	Barrymore	Dunbulloge	Cork
Glebe	14	Barrymore	Dungourney	Midleton
Glenarousk	1,059	Barrymore	Castlelyons	Fermoy
Glenathonacash	307	Barrymore	Ballyspillane	Midleton
Glenawillin	114	Barrymore	Templenacarriga	Midleton
Glenbeg	442	Barrymore	Dungourney	Midleton
Glengarriff Beg	180	Barrymore	Lisgoold	Midleton
Glengarriff More	184	Barrymore	Lisgoold	Midleton
Glenreagh	71	Barrymore	Templenacarriga	Midleton
**Glenville**	Town	Barrymore	Ardnageehy	Cork
Glenville	941	Barrymore	Ardnageehy	Cork
Gneeves	70	Barrymore	Rathcormack	Fermoy
Gogganstown	278	Barrymore	Kilquane	Cork
Gormlee	551	Barrymore	Dunbulloge	Cork
Gortacrue	454	Barrymore	Ballyspillane	Midleton
Gortagousta	23	Barrymore	Carrigtohill	Midleton
Gortnalahee	309	Barrymore	Dunbulloge	Cork
Gortnamucky	239	Barrymore	Carrigtohill	Midleton
Graigue East	192	Barrymore	Ardnageehy	Cork
Graigue West	969	Barrymore	Ardnageehy	Cork
Grange	337	Barrymore	Castlelyons	Fermoy
Gurteen	724	Barrymore	Clonmult	Middleton
Harpers Island	69	Barrymore	Little Island	Cork
Harrisgrove	38	Barrymore	Inchinabacky	Midleton
Haulbowline Island	27	Barrymore	Templerobin	Cork
Hermitage	100	Barrymore	Templeusque	Cork
Hightown	404	Barrymore	Gortroe	Fermoy
Hollyhill	111	Barrymore	Gortroe	Fermoy
Inchera	84	Barrymore	Little Island	Cork
Inchinanagh	230	Barrymore	Ardnageehy	Fermoy
Island	236	Barrymore	Dunbulloge	Cork
Johnstown	175	Barrymore	Carrigtohill	Midleton
Kilbrien	217	Barrymore	Rathcormack	Fermoy
Kilcoolishal	442	Barrymore	Caherlag	Cork
Kilcor North	538	Barrymore	Castlelyons	Fermoy
Kilcor South	889	Barrymore	Castlelyons	Fermoy
Kilcurtin Glebe	10	Barrymore	Carrigtohill	Midleton
Kildinan	748	Barrymore	Rathcormack	Fermoy
Kilgarvan	83	Barrymore	Templerobin	Cork
Killacloyne	184	Barrymore	Carrigtohill	Midleton
Killacloyne	328	Barrymore	Caherlag	Midleton
Killahora	424	Barrymore	Caherlag	Midleton
Killalough	149	Barrymore	Templeusque	Cork
Killamurren	333	Barrymore	Gortroe	Fermoy
Killawillin	540	Barrymore	Castlelyons	Fermoy
Killeagh	147	Barrymore	Ballycurrany	Midleton
Killeagh	631	Barrymore	Ardnageehy	Fermoy
Killeena	523	Barrymore	Kilquane	Cork
Killeendooling	195	Barrymore	Ballyspillane	Midleton
Kill-saint-anne North	348	Barrymore	Castlelyons	Fermoy
Kill-saint-anne South	496	Barrymore	Castlelyons	Fermoy
Killuntin North	381	Barrymore	Ardnageehy	Fermoy
Killuntin South	333	Barrymore	Ardnageehy	Fermoy
Killydonoghoe	457	Barrymore	Templeusque	Cork
Kilquane	269	Barrymore	Kilquane	Cork
Kilrussane	241	Barrymore	Killaspugmullane	Cork
Kilshannig Lower	123	Barrymore	Rathcormack	Fermoy
Kilshannig Upper	238	Barrymore	Rathcormack	Fermoy
Knockadroleen	43	Barrymore	Rathcormack	Fermoy
Knockakeen	388	Barrymore	Ballycurrany	Midleton
Knockanemore	80	Barrymore	Dungourney	Midleton
Knockanenafinoga	72	Barrymore	Kilquane	Cork
Knockaneshane	66	Barrymore	Templenacarriga	Midleton
Knockauduff	215	Barrymore	Rathcormack	Fermoy
Knockaunacorrin	120	Barrymore	Rathcormack	Fermoy
Knockaunalour	545	Barrymore	Ardnageehy	Cork
Knockavuddig	190	Barrymore	Clonmult	Midleton
Knockboy	533	Barrymore	Dunbulloge	Cork
Knockdoorty	358	Barrymore	Ardnageehy	Fermoy
Knockeennagroagh	739	Barrymore	Gortroe	Fermoy
Knockgriffin (Barrymore)	86	Barrymore	Mogeesha	Midleton
Knocknabooly	142	Barrymore	Gortroe	Fermoy
Knocknacaheragh	386	Barrymore	Dunbulloge	Cork
Knocknagare	48	Barrymore	Britway	Midleton
Knocknaglohall	81	Barrymore	Britway	Midleton
Knocknamouragh	168	Barrymore	Templenacarriga	Midleton
Knocknaskagh	83	Barrymore	Britway	Middleton
**Knockraha**	Town	Barrymore	Kilquane	Cork
Knockraha East	265	Barrymore	Kilquane	Cork
Knockraha West	188	Barrymore	Kilquane	Cork
Knoppoge	11	Barrymore	Gortroe	Fermoy
Knoppoge	328	Barrymore	Ardnageehy	Fermoy
Labaun	13	Barrymore	Carrigtohill	Midleton
Lackabeha East	126	Barrymore	Gortroe	Fermoy
Lackabeha West	97	Barrymore	Gortroe	Fermoy
Lackenbehy	306	Barrymore	Carrigtohill	Midleton
Lackendarragh Middle	213	Barrymore	Ardnageehy	Fermoy
Lackendarragh North	1,445	Barrymore	Ardnageehy	Fermoy
Lackendarragh South	364	Barrymore	Ardnageehy	Fermoy
Lackenroe	451	Barrymore	Caherlag	Cork
Laharan	182	Barrymore	Dunbulloge	Cork
Leadinton	454	Barrymore	Templenacarriga	Midleton
Leamlara	278	Barrymore	Ballycurrany	Midleton
Leamlara	38	Barrymore	Lisgoold	Midleton
Lisgoold East	367	Barrymore	Lisgoold	Midleton
Lisgoold North	325	Barrymore	Lisgoold	Midleton
Lisgoold West	213	Barrymore	Lisgoold	Midleton
Lisheenroe	115	Barrymore	Kilquane	Cork
Lisnagar Demesne	459	Barrymore	Rathcormack	Fermoy
Lissanisky	94	Barrymore	Clonmel	Cork
Lissurla	173	Barrymore	Gortroe	Fermoy
Longstown	128	Barrymore	Carrigtohill	Midleton
Loughaphreaghaun	80	Barrymore	Rathcormack	Fermoy
Lyravarrig	495	Barrymore	Ardnageehy	Cork
Lyre	929	Barrymore	Dunbulloge	Cork
Lyrenamom	189	Barrymore	Dunbulloge	Cork
Lysaghtstown	270	Barrymore	Carrigtohill	Midleton
Marino	329	Barrymore	Clonmel	Cork
Maulane East	191	Barrymore	Rathcormack	Fermoy
Maulane West	220	Barrymore	Rathcormack	Fermoy
Meeleen	361	Barrymore	Kilquane	Cork
Meenane	559	Barrymore	Ardnageehy	Fermoy
Mellefontstown	566	Barrymore	Gortroe	Fermoy
Mitchellsfort	903	Barrymore	Kilquane	Cork
Moanbaun	400	Barrymore	Ballycurrany	Midleton
Moanlahan	522	Barrymore	Rathcormack	Fermoy
Mohera	904	Barrymore	Castlelyons	Fermoy
Monananig	67	Barrymore	Templebodan	Fermoy
Monananig	713	Barrymore	Gortroe	Fermoy
Monaneague	163	Barrymore	Kilquane	Cork
Monatooreen	182	Barrymore	Kilquane	Cork
Mondaniel	602	Barrymore	Rathcormack	Fermoy
Moneygorm	633	Barrymore	Ardnageehy	Fermoy
Mountcatherine	319	Barrymore	Kilshanahan	Fermoy
Mullenaboree	883	Barrymore	Ardnageehy	Cork
Mullenataura	955	Barrymore	Rathcormack	Fermoy
**New Glanmire**	Town	Barrymore	Caherlag	Cork
Oldcourt	17	Barrymore	Clonmel	Cork
Oldcourt	470	Barrymore	Templebodan	Midleton
Oldcourt East	173	Barrymore	Templenacarriga	Midleton
Oldcourt West	120	Barrymore	Templenacarriga	Midleton
Peafield	1,153	Barrymore	Templebodan	Midleton
Peafield	22	Barrymore	Gortroe	Fermoy
Pellick	324	Barrymore	Castlelyons	Fermoy
Pigeonhill	52	Barrymore	Kilquane	Cork
Portavarrig	12	Barrymore	Britway	Midleton
Portavarrig	145	Barrymore	Templebodan	Midleton
Portduff	162	Barrymore	Rathcormack	Fermoy
Pouladown	171	Barrymore	Templeusque	Cork
Poulaniska	53	Barrymore	Carrigtohill	Midleton
Poundquarter	88	Barrymore	Lisgoold	Midleton
Prap	180	Barrymore	Rathcormack	Fermoy
**Queenstown**	Town	Barrymore	Clonmel	Cork
**Queenstown**	Town	Barrymore	Templerobin	Cork
Raheen	107	Barrymore	Rathcormack	Fermoy
Rathaneague	360	Barrymore	Gortroe	Fermoy
Rathbarry	47	Barrymore	Castlelyons	Fermoy
Rathcobane	21	Barrymore	Gortroe	Midleton
Rathcobane	558	Barrymore	Templebodan	Midleton
**Rathcormack**	Town	Barrymore	Rathcormack	Fermoy
Rathcormack	202	Barrymore	Rathcormack	Fermoy
Rathcormack-mountain	481	Barrymore	Rathcormack	Fermoy
Rathfilode	301	Barrymore	Kilquane	Cork
Rathfootera	179	Barrymore	Dungourney	Midleton
Rathgire	143	Barrymore	Templenacarriga	Midleton
Rathorgan	323	Barrymore	Dungourney	Midleton
Riesk	383	Barrymore	Templebodan	Midleton
Ringacoltig	135	Barrymore	Clonmel	Cork
Ringmeen	251	Barrymore	Clonmel	Cork
**Riverstown**	Town	Barrymore	Templeusque	Cork
Riverstown	449	Barrymore	Templeusque	Cork
Riverstown	56	Barrymore	Ballydeloher	Cork
Rocky Island	2	Barrymore	Templerobin	Cork
Rosslague	226	Barrymore	Templerobin	Cork
Rossmore	384	Barrymore	Mogeesha	Middleton
Rowgarrane	240	Barrymore	Caherlag	Cork
Roxborough	124	Barrymore	Inchinabacky	Midleton
Rupperagh	252	Barrymore	Kilquane	Cork
Ryefield East	346	Barrymore	Whitechurch	Cork
Ryefield West	163	Barrymore	Whitechurch	Cork
Sandyhill	325	Barrymore	Dungourney	Midleton
Sarsfieldscourt	621	Barrymore	Templeusque	Cork
Scartbarry	706	Barrymore	Kilshanahan	Fermoy
Shanaclogh	88	Barrymore	Rathcormack	Fermoy
Shanavagha	226	Barrymore	Rathcormack	Fermoy
Shanavougha	174	Barrymore	Templenacarriga	Midleton
Shanbally	97	Barrymore	Rathcormack	Fermoy
Shanballyreagh	422	Barrymore	Kilquane	Cork
Sheepwalk	269	Barrymore	Dungourney	Midleton
Skahanagh North	561	Barrymore	Kilshanahan	Fermoy
Skahanagh South	791	Barrymore	Kilshanahan	Fermoy
Spike Island	98	Barrymore	Templerobin	Cork
Springhill	165	Barrymore	Carrigtohill	Midleton
Spurree	276	Barrymore	Castlelyons	Fermoy
Templebodan	253	Barrymore	Templebodan	Midleton
Templemichael	542	Barrymore	St. Michael's	Cork
Templenacarriga North	175	Barrymore	Templenacarriga	Midleton
Templenacarriga South	205	Barrymore	Templenacarriga	Midleton
Templeusque	458	Barrymore	Templeusque	Cork
Terramount	127	Barrymore	Rathcormack	Fermoy
Terry's-land	269	Barrymore	Carrigtohill	Midleton
Tibbotstown	228	Barrymore	Carrigtohill	Midleton
Tiknock	23	Barrymore	Templerobin	Cork
Tinageragh	468	Barrymore	Ardnageehy	Fermoy
Toberaneague	286	Barrymore	Rathcormack	Fermoy
Toorgarriff	644	Barrymore	Ardnageehy	Fermoy
Towermore Lower	160	Barrymore	Castlelyons	Fermoy
Towermore Upper	246	Barrymore	Castlelyons	Fermoy
Trantstown	500	Barrymore	Killaspugmullane	Cork
Tullagreen	113	Barrymore	Carrigtohill	Middleton
Wallings-town	377	Barrymore	Little Island	Cork
**Walshtown**	Town	Barrymore	Templenacarriga	Midleton
Walshtown Beg	918	Barrymore	Templenacarriga	Midleton
Walshtown More East	290	Barrymore	Templenacarriga	Midleton
Walshtown More West	567	Barrymore	Templenacarriga	Midleton
Walshtownmore	52	Barrymore	Ballyspillane	Midleton
Walterstown	330	Barrymore	Templerobin	Cork
**Watergrasshill**	Town	Barrymore	Ardnageehy	Fermoy
**Watergrasshill**	Town	Barrymore	Kilquane	Cork
Water-rock	349	Barrymore	Carrigtohill	Midleton
**White Point**	Town	Barrymore	Clonmel	Cork
Woodstock	581	Barrymore	Carrigtohill	Midleton
Young-grove	577	Barrymore	Dungourney	Midleton
