= Cork (barony) =

Barony in Cork, Ireland

Cork (Irish: Corcaigh) is a barony in County Cork, Ireland, surrounding the city of Cork. The barony comprises the former Liberties of Cork, the area which was within the county of the city of Cork but outside the municipal borough of Cork. The liberties were defined by the charter granted in 1608 by James I of England as extending three miles in all directions from the city walls. Under the Municipal Corporations Act (Ireland) 1840, the liberties were detached from the county of the city, and attached to the county of Cork as a new barony.

The Barony of Cork City comprises the former area of the municipal borough. No modifications to barony boundaries have been made since the Local Government (Ireland) Act 1898. The boundary of the city (previously county borough) of Cork has been extended since 1898 beyond the barony of Cork City and now includes parts of the barony of Cork.

== Legal context ==
Baronies were created after the Norman invasion of Ireland as divisions of counties and were used the administration of justice and the raising of revenue. While baronies continue to be officially defined units, they have been administratively obsolete since 1898. However, they continue to be used in land registration and in specification, such as in planning permissions. In many cases, a barony corresponds to an earlier Gaelic túath which had submitted to the Crown.

== Location ==
The barony, doughnut-like, entirely surrounds the Barony of Cork City. Other neighbouring baronies include Barrymore to the east, Barretts to the north-west, Muskerry East to the west, and Kerrycurrihy to the south. The River Lee bisects the barony from west to east.

== Subdivisions ==
The barony of Cork comprises part or all of 16 civil parishes:

Parish	Irish name	Location within barony of Cork	Other baronies in parish	Notes	References
Rathcooney	Ráth Chuanna	North-east	None		
St. Michael's	Paróiste Mhichíl	North	Barrymore	Only the townland of Ballinvriskig is in the barony of Cork.	
Dunbulloge	Dún Bolg	North	Barrymore	Only the townland of Ballyhesty is in the barony of Cork.	
Kilcully	Cill Chúile	North	None		
St. Anne's, Shandon	Paróiste San Anna	North, inner	Cork City	See Church of St Anne	
St. Mary's, Shandon	Paróiste Mhuire	North-west, inner	Cork City		
Whitechurch	An Teampall Geal	North-west	Barrymore, Barretts		
Currykippane	Currach Cheapáin	West, north of the River Lee	None		
Carrigrohane	Carraig Ruacháin	West, south of the River Lee	Muskerry East		
St. Finbar's	Paróiste Fhionnbharra	South	Cork City	Cathedral parish; see Saint Finbarre's Cathedral	
Kilnaglory	Cill na Gluaire	South-west	Muskerry East	Only the townland of Ballynora is in the barony of Cork.	
St. Nicholas	Paróiste San Nioclás	South, inner	Cork City, Muskerry East	Only the detached townland of Maglin is in Muskerry East.	
Inishkenny	Inis Cionaoith	South	Muskerry East		
Ballinaboy	Baile na Baoi	South	Muskerry East, Kerrycurrihy, Kinalea		
Killanully	Cill an Eallaigh	South	Cork City, Kerrycurrihy		
Carrigaline	Carraig Uí Leighin	South-east	Muskerry East, Kerrycurrihy, Kinalea		
