= List of townlands of the barony of Barretts =

This is a sortable table of the townlands in the barony of Barretts, County Cork, Ireland. Duplicate names occur where there is more than one townland with the same name in the barony, and also where a townland is known by two alternative names. Names marked in bold typeface are towns and villages, and the word Town appears for those entries in the area column.

== Townland list ==
Townland	Area (acres)	Barony	Civil parish	Poor law union
Ahadallane	759	Barretts	Donaghmore	Cork
Ballycraheen	260	Barretts	Donaghmore	Cork
Ballyfadeen Beg	234	Barretts	Grenagh	Cork
Ballyfadeen More	468	Barretts	Grenagh	Cork
Ballyfilibeen	491	Barretts	Mourneabbey	Mallow
Ballyfireen	234	Barretts	Grenagh	Cork
Ballyglass	355	Barretts	Grenagh	Cork
Ballygrogan	481	Barretts	Grenagh	Cork
Ballyhilloge	954	Barretts	Grenagh	Cork
Ballyknockane	497	Barretts	Mourneabbey	Mallow
Ballymorishee	824	Barretts	Grenagh	Cork
Ballynamona	416	Barretts	Mourneabbey	Mallow
Ballyvaloon	592	Barretts	Grenagh	Cork
Barrinclay	408	Barretts	Mourneabbey	Mallow
Burnfort	538	Barretts	Mourneabbey	Mallow
Carrigduff	791	Barretts	Mourneabbey	Mallow
Castlebarrett	122	Barretts	Mourneabbey	Mallow
Clashmorgan	525	Barretts	Mourneabbey	Mallow
Clogheen	456	Barretts	Mourneabbey	Mallow
Commons	575	Barretts	Grenagh	Cork
Currafarry	310	Barretts	Donaghmore	Cork
Curragh	307	Barretts	Donaghmore	Cork
Dromgarriff North	348	Barretts	Whitechurch	Cork
Dromgarriff South	218	Barretts	Whitechurch	Cork
Farran	527	Barretts	Mourneabbey	Mallow
Firmount	268	Barretts	Donaghmore	Cork
Garraun North	746	Barretts	Donaghmore	Cork
Garraun South	512	Barretts	Donaghmore	Cork
Garryadeen	264	Barretts	Grenagh	Cork
Garrycloyne	426	Barretts	Garrycloyne	Cork
Garrynagearagh	576	Barretts	Mourneabbey	Mallow
Glancam	527	Barretts	Grenagh	Cork
Glynn	592	Barretts	Mourneabbey	Mallow
Gortdotia North	130	Barretts	Whitechurch	Cork
Gortdotia South	136	Barretts	Whitechurch	Cork
Greenhill	657	Barretts	Mourneabbey	Mallow
Grenagh North	476	Barretts	Grenagh	Cork
Grenagh South	390	Barretts	Grenagh	Cork
Kilmona	771	Barretts	Grenagh	Cork
Kilquane	523	Barretts	Mourneabbey	Mallow
Knockane	214	Barretts	Donaghmore	Cork
Knockanroe	102	Barretts	Whitechurch	Cork
Knockantota North	340	Barretts	Grenagh	Cork
Knockantota South	407	Barretts	Grenagh	Cork
Knocknabehy	516	Barretts	Grenagh	Cork
Knocknalyre	441	Barretts	Garrycloyne	Cork
Lahakinneen	379	Barretts	Mourneabbey	Mallow
Lisheenowen	120	Barretts	Whitechurch	Cork
Lissard	1,121	Barretts	Grenagh	Cork
Lissavoura	488	Barretts	Grenagh	Cork
Longstone	356	Barretts	Whitechurch	Cork
Lyradane	1,481	Barretts	Grenagh	Cork
Maulrane	214	Barretts	Grenagh	Cork
Monalahy	202	Barretts	Grenagh	Cork
Monaparson	354	Barretts	Mourneabbey	Mallow
Mourneabbey	81	Barretts	Mourneabbey	Mallow
Newcastle	477	Barretts	Grenagh	Cork
Pluckanes East	366	Barretts	Donaghmore	Cork
Pluckanes North	1,042	Barretts	Donaghmore	Cork
Pluckanes South	175	Barretts	Donaghmore	Cork
Pluckanes West	357	Barretts	Donaghmore	Cork
Raheen	86	Barretts	Whitechurch	Cork
Rathduff	799	Barretts	Grenagh	Cork
Shanlyre	195	Barretts	Whitechurch	Cork
Slievedotia	712	Barretts	Whitechurch	Cork
Tooreen North	1,133	Barretts	Mourneabbey	Mallow
Tooreen South	980	Barretts	Mourneabbey	Mallow
Tullig	213	Barretts	Whitechurch	Cork
