= Cork North Ring Road =

Cork North Ring Road may refer to

- R635 road (Ireland), existing regional road running from N8 at Tivoli through Mayfield to N20 at Blackpool
- N40 road (Ireland)#Future plans, planned national road running from N22 at Ballincollig through Monard to M8 at Knockraha
