= List of townlands of the barony of Cork =

This is a sortable table of the townlands in the baronies of Cork and Cork City, County Cork in Ireland. Duplicate names occur where there is more than one townland with the same name in the barony, and also where a townland is known by two alternative names. Names marked in bold typeface are towns and villages, and the word Town appears for those entries in the area column.

== Townland list ==
Townland	Area (acres)	Barony	Civil parish	Poor law union
Ardarostig	242	Cork	Inishkenny	Cork
Ardarrig	55	Cork	Carrigaline	Cork
Arderrow	140	Cork	Rathcooney	Cork
Ardmanning Beg	5	Cork	St. Finbar's	Cork
Ardmanning More	20	Cork	St. Finbar's	Cork
Ballinamought East	242	Cork	St. Anne's Shandon	Cork
Ballinamought West	209	Cork, Muni. Borough of	St. Anne's Shandon	Cork
Ballinaspig Beg	234	Cork	St. Finbar's	Cork
Ballinaspig More	919	Cork	St. Finbar's	Cork
Ballincolly	257	Cork	St. Anne's Shandon	Cork
Ballincranig	363	Cork	Ballinaboy	Cork
Ballincrokig	111	Cork	St. Anne's Shandon	Cork
Ballincrokig	168	Cork	Rathcooney	Cork
Ballincrossig	217	Cork	Rathcooney	Cork
Ballincurrig	306	Cork	St. Finbar's	Cork
Ballinimlagh	105	Cork	Carrigaline	Cork
Ballinlough	312	Cork	St. Finbar's	Cork
Ballinrea	888	Cork	Carrigaline	Cork
Ballintannig	203	Cork	Ballinaboy	Cork
**Ballintemple**	Town	Cork	St. Finbar's	Cork
Ballintemple	292	Cork	St. Finbar's	Cork
Ballinure	483	Cork	St. Finbar's	Cork
Ballinvarrig	795	Cork	Whitechurch	Cork
Ballinveiltig	205	Cork	Inishkenny	Cork
Ballinvoultig	189	Cork	Inishkenny	Cork
Ballinvrinsig	319	Cork	Inishkenny	Cork
Ballinvriskig	689	Cork	St. Michael's	Cork
Ballinvuskig	494	Cork	Killanully	Cork
Ballybrack	17	Cork	Carrigaline	Cork
Ballycannon	216	Cork	Currykippane	Cork
Ballycurreen	612	Cork	St. Finbar's	Cork
Ballyduhig North	283	Cork	Carrigaline	Cork
Ballygaggin	126	Cork	St. Finbar's	Cork
Ballygrohan	97	Cork	Currykippane	Cork
Ballyharoon	178	Cork	Rathcooney	Cork
Ballyhesty	249	Cork	Dunbulloge	Cork
Ballymah	369	Cork	Inishkenny	Cork
Ballynahina	737	Cork	Kilcully	Cork
Ballynoe	297	Cork	Rathcooney	Cork
Ballynora	879	Cork	Kilnaglory	Cork
Ballyorban	564	Cork	Carrigaline	Cork
Ballyphehane	128	Cork	St. Finbar's	Cork
Ballyphehane	205	Cork	St. Nicholas	Cork
Ballyphilip	313	Cork	Rathcooney	Cork
Ballysheehy	122	Cork	Currykippane	Cork
Ballyvolane	317	Cork	St. Anne's Shandon	Cork
Banduff	292	Cork	Rathcooney	Cork
Bishop's-mill-lands	52	Cork	St. Finbar's	Cork
**Blackrock**	Town	Cork	St. Finbar's	Cork
Boolybeg	184	Cork	Whitechurch	Cork
Brick Island	2	Cork	Carrigaline	Cork
Browningstown	65	Cork	St. Finbar's	Cork
Cahergal	204	Cork	St. Anne's Shandon	Cork
Carhoo	211	Cork	Whitechurch	Cork
Carrignaveagh	20	Cork	St. Mary's Shandon	Cork
Carrigrohane	1,543	Cork	Carrigrohane	Cork
Castletreasure	827	Cork	Carrigaline	Cork
Chetwynd	287	Cork	St. Finbar's	Cork
Clashduff	52	Cork	St. Finbar's	Cork
Clashnaganniff	35	Cork	St. Anne's Shandon	Cork
Clogheen	490	Cork	Currykippane	Cork
Closes	31	Cork	St. Anne's Shandon	Cork
Commons	268	Cork	St. Anne's Shandon	Cork
Commons	54	Cork	St. Mary's Shandon	Cork
Coole East	507	Cork	Rathcooney	Cork
Coole West	550	Cork	Rathcooney	Cork
Cooleen and Raheen	10	Cork	St. Nicholas	Cork
Coolowen	1,033	Cork	Whitechurch	Cork
Coolymurraghue	658	Cork	Currykippane	Cork
Coppingersacre	5	Cork	St. Mary's Shandon	Cork
Coppingersstang	20	Cork	St. Finbar's	Cork
Croghtamore	88	Cork	St. Finbar's	Cork
Curraghconway	527	Cork	St. Finbar's	Cork
Curraheen	196	Cork	Inishkenny	Cork
Curraheen	61	Cork	Carrigrohane	Cork
Deanrock	90	Cork	St. Finbar's	Cork
Doughcloyne	381	Cork	St. Finbar's	Cork
**Douglas**	Town	Cork	Carrigaline	Cork
Douglas	254	Cork	Carrigaline	Cork
Dundanion	198	Cork	St. Finbar's	Cork
Farranastig	1,799	Cork	Whitechurch	Cork
Farrancleary	15	Cork, Muni. Borough of	St. Anne's Shandon	Cork
Farrandahadore Beg	34	Cork	St. Finbar's	Cork
Farrandahadore More	137	Cork	St. Finbar's	Cork
Farranferris	93	Cork and Muni. Borough	St. Anne's Shandon	Cork
Farranmacteige	135	Cork	St. Finbar's	Cork
Freagh and Vicarsacre	22	Cork	St. Finbar's	Cork
Garranabraher	316	Cork	St. Mary's Shandon	Cork
Garraneboy	200	Cork	Rathcooney	Cork
Garranedarragh	169	Cork	St. Finbar's	Cork
Gillabbey	113	Cork and Muni. Borough	St. Finbar's	Cork
Glankittane	60	Cork, Muni. Borough of	St. Anne's Shandon	Cork
**Glanmire**	Town	Cork	Rathcooney	Cork
Goat Island	3	Cork	Carrigaline	Cork
Gortagoulane	401	Cork	St. Finbar's	Cork
Grange	156	Cork	Carrigaline	Cork
Grange	238	Cork	St. Finbar's	Cork
Gurteenaspig	45	Cork and Muni. Borough	St. Finbar's	Cork
Hop-island	12	Cork	Carrigaline	Cork
Huggarts-land	76	Cork	St. Finbar's	Cork
Inchigaggin	250	Cork	St. Finbar's	Cork
Inchisarsfield	60	Cork	St. Finbar's	Cork
Inishkenny	212	Cork	Inishkenny	Cork
Kerryhall	6	Cork and Muni. Borough	St. Anne's Shandon	Cork
Kilbarry	311	Cork and Muni. Borough	St. Anne's Shandon	Cork
Kilcronan	376	Cork	Whitechurch	Cork
Kilcully	324	Cork	Kilcully	Cork
Killard	530	Cork	Currykippane	Cork
Killavarrig	317	Cork	Whitechurch	Cork
Killeendaniel	320	Cork	Kilcully	Cork
Killeenreendowney	188	Cork	St. Finbar's	Cork
Killeens	943	Cork	St. Mary's Shandon	Cork
Kilmurriheen	218	Cork	Inishkenny	Cork
Kilnap	193	Cork	St. Anne's Shandon	Cork
Knockalisheen	225	Cork	Inishkenny	Cork
Knockaneag	311	Cork	Whitechurch	Cork
Knockfree	27	Cork and Muni. Borough	St. Mary's Shandon	Cork
Knocknabohilly	100	Cork and Muni. Borough	St. Mary's Shandon	Cork
Knocknacullen East	152	Cork	St. Mary's Shandon	Cork
Knocknacullen West	215	Cork	St. Mary's Shandon	Cork
Knocknagorty	180	Cork	Currykippane	Cork
Knocknaheeny	181	Cork and Muni. Borough	St. Mary's Shandon	Cork
**Knocknahorgan**	Town	Cork	Rathcooney	Cork
Knocknahorgan	502	Cork	Rathcooney	Cork
Knocknalyre	82	Cork	Ballinaboy	Cork
Knocknamallavoge	181	Cork	Inishkenny	Cork
Knocknamullagh	335	Cork	Carrigaline	Cork
Knockpoge	9	Cork	St. Anne's Shandon	Cork
Knockrea	272	Cork and Muni. Borough	St. Nicholas	Cork
Lahardane	208	Cork	Rathcooney	Cork
Lehenagh Beg	122	Cork	St. Finbar's	Cork
Lehenagh More	1,021	Cork	St. Finbar's	Cork
Lisnahorna	191	Cork	Rathcooney	Cork
Lota Beg	201	Cork	Rathcooney	Cork
Lota More	539	Cork	Rathcooney	Cork
Mahon	266	Cork	St. Finbar's	Cork
Maryborough	264	Cork	Carrigaline	Cork
Monard	868	Cork	Whitechurch	Cork
Moneygurney	911	Cork	Carrigaline	Cork
Monfieldstown	431	Cork	Carrigaline	Cork
Mount Desert	413	Cork	Currykippane	Cork
Mounthovel	178	Cork	Carrigaline	Cork
Oldcourt	344	Cork	Carrigaline	Cork
Parknaglantane	8	Cork	St. Mary's Shandon	Cork
Parknock	4	Cork, Muni. Borough of	St. Mary's Shandon	Cork
Piercetown	308	Cork	St. Anne's Shandon	Cork
Poulacurry North	175	Cork	Rathcooney	Cork
Poulacurry South	238	Cork	Rathcooney	Cork
Rahanisky	376	Cork	Kilcully	Cork
Raheen and Cooleen	10	Cork	St. Nicholas	Cork
Rathcooney	229	Cork	Rathcooney	Cork
Rathmacullig East	214	Cork	Killanully	Cork
Rathmacullig West	241	Cork	Killanully	Cork
Rathmore	103	Cork, Muni. Borough of	St. Anne's Shandon	Cork
Rathpeacon	719	Cork	Whitechurch	Cork
Rochestown	505	Cork	Carrigaline	Cork
Rochfordstown	538	Cork	Inishkenny	Cork
**Sallybrook**	Town	Cork	Rathcooney	Cork
Shanakiel	178	Cork and Muni. Borough	St. Mary's Shandon	Cork
Skahabeg North	55	Cork	St. Nicholas	Cork
Skahabeg South	29	Cork	St. Nicholas	Cork
Spital-lands	112	Cork and Muni. Borough	St. Nicholas	Cork
Suburbs of Cork	1	Cork	St. Anne's Shandon	Cork
Suburbs of Cork	1	Cork	St. Mary's Shandon	Cork
Suburbs of Cork	1	Cork	St. Nicholas	Cork
Suburbs of Cork	2	Cork	St. Finbar's	Cork
Vicarsacre and Freagh	22	Cork	St. Finbar's	Cork
Whitechurch	532	Cork	Whitechurch	Cork
