= Rena Manley =

Irish camogie player

- Born: 1941
- Died: 2010

Rena Manley (1941–2010), also known as Rene Manley, was an Irish camogie player. She was captain of the Cork camogie team in the early 1960s, winning the Munster Championship in 1962. She also won Gael Linn Cup medals with the Munster team in 1963 and 1964. Manley played as a forward. In obituaries in the Evening Echo and the Southern Star, she was described as a 'camogie legend'.

== Career ==
A former intercounty camogue player with Cork GAA, she previously played with St Aloysuis Secondary School, Cork. Manley was a member of the Old Aloysians 1960 Cork Senior Championship winning team. She played at senior level with Cork in 1960 and was captain of the Munster Championship winning team in 1962. She won Gael Linn medals in 1963 and 1964. She was involved in the formation of the St Catherine's Club, whom she captained to the Junior B County title in 1984. She was involved in coaching and training underage teams, was club secretary, and in 2008 was elected president of the club.

== Later life ==
Manley was married in 1966, and lived in Whitechurch. She was residing in Conna at the time of her death in 2010. She died in Cork University Hospital, following a short illness.
