= Bridebridge =

Village in County Cork, Ireland

Bridebridge Droichead na Bríde
- Village
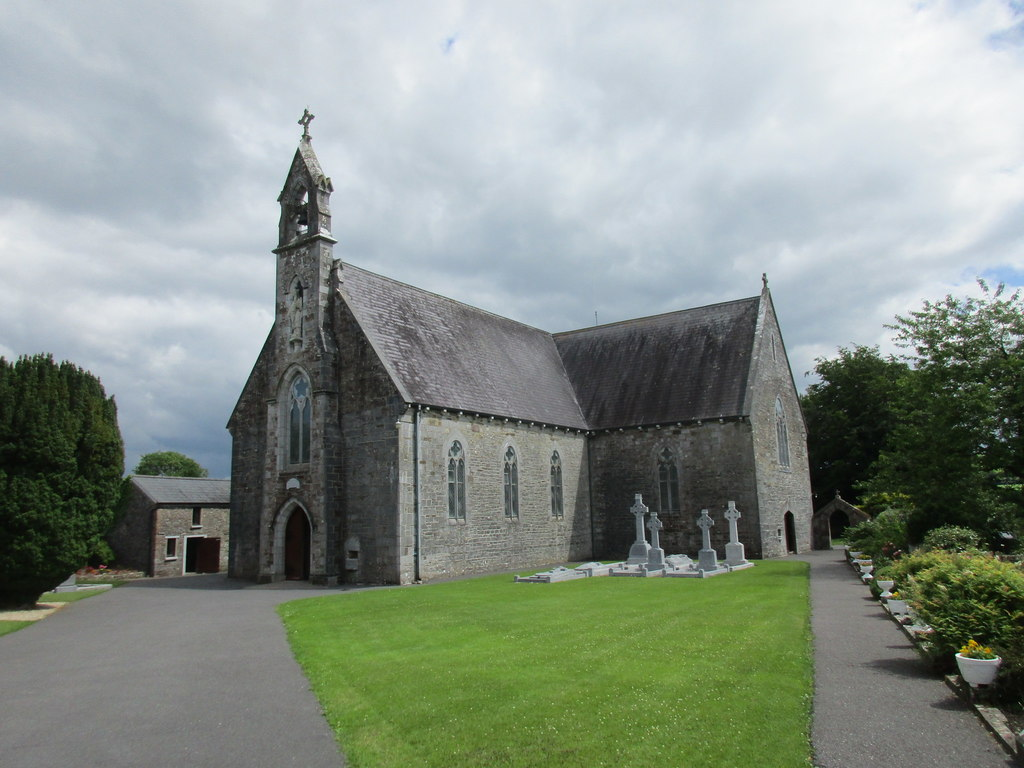
- St. Nicholas' Church

- Location in Ireland
- Coordinates: 52°04′47″N 8°13′41″W
- Country: Ireland
- Province: Munster
- County: County Cork
- Barony: Barrymore

Population (2022)
  - Total: 223

Bridebridge (Irish: Droichead na Bríde), also spelt Bridesbridge, is a village in County Cork, Ireland, just south of Castlelyons. The village is named for the stone bridge across the River Bride, at the south end of the village. The population was 223 at the 2022 census. The local soccer club is Castlebridge Celtic.
