= R616 road =

R616 road may refer to:

- R616 road (Ireland)
- R616 road (South Africa)
