= Fartha =

Fartha may refer to:

- Fartha, County Cavan, Ireland
- Fartha, County Cork, Ireland, a townland
