= Alexander La Milliere =

Alexander La Milliere (b Dublin 9 July 1723 - 7 September 1800) was Archdeacon of Cork from 1796 until his death.

La Milliere was of French descent and was educated at Trinity College Dublin. He was the incumbent at Curraghconway and Chancellor of Cork Cathedral from 1774 until 1782.
