= Carrignavar =

Village in County Cork, Ireland

Carrignavar Carraig na bhFear
- Village
- Location in Ireland
- Coordinates: 51°59′20″N 8°28′37″W
- Country: Ireland
- Province: Munster
- County: Cork
- Barony: Barrymore
- Civil parish: Dunbulloge and Whitechurch
- Elevation: 120 m (390 ft)

Population (2016)
  - Total: 519
- Eircode (Routing Key): T34
- OSI grid reference: W6770281992

Carrignavar (Irish: Carraig na bhFear, meaning 'the rock of the men') is a village in County Cork, north of Cork city. It lies east of Whitechurch and west of the R614 road, by a bridge over the Cloghnagash River. For election purposes, Carrignavar is within the Dáil constituency of Cork North-Central, and (for planning purposes) is designated a "key village" within the municipal district of Cobh by Cork County Council.

== History ==
A castle was built at Carrignavar by Donal or Daniel McCarthy, younger brother of the first Viscount Muskerry, of the MacCarthy of Muskerry family. It was said to have been the last fortress in Munster to fall to Cromwell. His descendants (surname variously spelt McCarty or McCartie) lived there into the nineteenth century, though, by 1840, little more than a square tower remained. In the eighteenth century, Charles MacCarthy was a Jacobite sympathiser and patron of late Gaelic poetry; he and his poets converted, at least in form, from Roman Catholicism to the Anglican Church of Ireland to escape the Penal Laws.

Carrignavar House, a castellated country house, was built beside the castle ruins in the late nineteenth century. John Sheedy bought it in the early twentieth century and later sold it to the Sacred Heart Fathers, who opened Sacred Heart College (Irish: Coláiste an Chroí Naofa) secondary school there in 1950.
