= Barrymore =

Barrymore is a surname. Notable people with the surname include:

- Barrymore family of American actors
- Earl of Barrymore, a title in the Kingdom of Ireland dating to 1622

== People with the surname Barrymore ==
- Deborah Barrymore aka Deborah Moore (born 1963), English actress
- Diana Barrymore (1921–1960), American actress
- Drew Barrymore (born 1975), American actress and producer
- Ethel Barrymore (1879–1959), American actress
- John Barrymore (1882–1942), American actor
- John Drew Barrymore (1932–2004), also known as John Barrymore Jr., actor
- Lionel Barrymore (1878–1954), American actor
- Maurice Barrymore (1849–1905), forefather of the Barrymore family of American actors
- Michael Barrymore (born 1952), English comedian

== Fictional people with the surname Barrymore ==
- Mr. & Mrs. Barrymore, characters of the novel The Hound of the Baskervilles

== See also ==
- Barony of Barrymore, a barony in County Cork, Ireland
- Barrymore (play), a one-man show starring Christopher Plummer and written by William Luce
  - Barrymore (film), 2011 film adaptation of the play
- Barrymore (TV series), a TV show hosted by Michael Barrymore
- Barrymore's, a nightclub in Ottawa, Ontario
