= R615 road (Ireland) =

Road in Ireland

Coordinates: 51.922300°N 8.409974°W

R615 road
- Bóthar R615

Route information
- Length: 3.2 km (2.0 mi)

Major junctions
- From: R639 Riverstown
- To: R635 Cork (Tinker's Cross)

Location
- Country: Ireland

Highway system
- Roads in Ireland; Motorways; Primary; Secondary; Regional

The R615 road is a regional road in Ireland, located in County Cork and Cork City. It forms part of the Old Youghal Road.
