= Barretts (barony) =

Barony in Cork, Ireland

Barretts (Irish: Baróidigh (Note: Barretts)) is a barony in northwest County Cork in Ireland. The name is derived from the Old English Barrett family.

Barretts is bordered by the baronies of Muskerry East to the south-west, Duhallow to the north-west, Fermoy to the north, Barrymore to the east and the Barony of Cork to the south-east. Until 1836, Barretts, Muskerry East and Muskerry West were interlaced with detached fragments of each other; land transfers by the Grand Jury (Ireland) Act 1838 regularised and consolidated their respective territories.

== Legal context ==
Baronies were created after the Norman invasion of Ireland as divisions of counties and were used for the administration of justice and the raising of revenue. While baronies continue to be officially defined units, they have been administratively obsolete since 1898. However, they continue to be used in land registration and in specification, such as in planning permissions. In many cases, a barony corresponds to an earlier Gaelic túath which had submitted to the Crown.

== Settlements ==
The largest settlement is Whitechurch.

== Civil parishes ==
There are four civil parishes in the barony:

- Donaghmore - Less than half of parish is in Barretts. The majority is in East Muskerry.
- Garrycloyne - A small part (most is in East Muskerry).
- Grenagh - except for one townland that is in East Muskerry
- Mourneabbey

== See also ==
- List of civil parishes of County Cork
- List of townlands of the barony of Barretts
