= Bartholomew MacCarthy =

Bartholomew MacCarthy (12 December 1843, in Conna, Ballynoe, County Cork – 6 March 1904, in Inniscarra, Co. Cork) was a scholar and chronologist who wrote extensively on Early Irish literature.

He was educated at Mount Melleray Abbey, Seminary, County Waterford, and at St Colman's College, Fermoy, Co. Cork, afterwards studying at Rome, where he was ordained in 1869. On his return to Ireland he was appointed professor of Classics at St. Colman's, where he remained about three years. He then went as curate to Mitchelstown (where he was at the time of a massacre in 1887), and afterwards to Macroom and Youghal. In 1895 he was appointed parish priest of Inniscarra, near Cork, where he died. A few months before his death, he had been chosen by the Government on the recommendation of the Council of the Royal Irish Academy to edit the Annals of Tighearnach. He often spoke critically of his predecessors, for instance of John Colgan, the O'Clerys, Eugene O'Curry, etc., and of contemporary scholars. A letter of his criticising a favourable review of John Salmon's Ancient Irish Church as a Witness to Catholic Doctrine in the Irish Ecclesiastical Record (August, 1897, 166-170) led to a controversy between these two Catholic scholars, which was carried on in that periodical the following year.

== Published works ==
- Essays on various Early Irish Ecclesiastical Fragments, written while he was in Rome and published mostly anonymously in the Irish Ecclesiastical Record (1864 sqq.)
- The Stowe Missal, perhaps his best-known work, published in the Transactions of the Royal Irish Academy, XXVII (1886), 135-268, in which he establishes the date of Moelchaich's recension as about 750 or at least the eighth century, and proves that the so-called Middle Irish corruptions can be paralleled from old Irish manuscripts, none of which are later than the ninth century; he also separates the earlier portion of the text into (a) the original Mass, dating from at least A.D. 500, called "Missa Patricii" in the Book of Armagh (A.D. 807), and (b) later augments and Roman contents.
- Four Dissertations on the Codex Palatino-Vaticanus, No. 830 (Chronica Mariani Scotti), published in the Todd Lecture Series of the Royal Irish Academy, III (1892), illustrated by studies on Old Irish Metric, the Synchronisms from the Book of Ballymote, Paschal computations, and various Irish historical documents.
- New Textual Studies on the Tripartite Life of St. Patrick, published in the Transactions of the Royal Irish Academy, XXIX, 183 sqq., in which he proves that portion of the material of the Vita Tripartita must date back to the middle of the sixth century.
- The Annals of Ulster. On the death of William M. Hennessey, Dr. MacCarthy was asked by the Government to continue the editing of this collection of Irish Annals in the Rolls Series. He published vols. II (1893), III (1895), and IV (1901). In the introduction to the fourth and final volume of these annals he deals in detail of various questions connected with the history of chronology among the nations of western Europe. These include discussions of the ancient Paschal cycle of 84 years and other Paschal computations in vogue in Ireland, the origin of A.D. dating in Irish annals, the methods of rectifying errors in the same, and the history of the various British or Irish falsifications which appeared during the disputes regarding Easter in the insular churches of the West, such as the Acts of Caesarea, the Athanasian Tractate, the Book of Anatolius, and the "Epistle" of Cyril of Alexandria. MacCarthy was recognized as an authority on the Paschal question.
