= R614 road (Ireland) =

Road in Ireland

Coordinates: 52.062006°N 8.330190°W

R614 road
- Bóthar R614
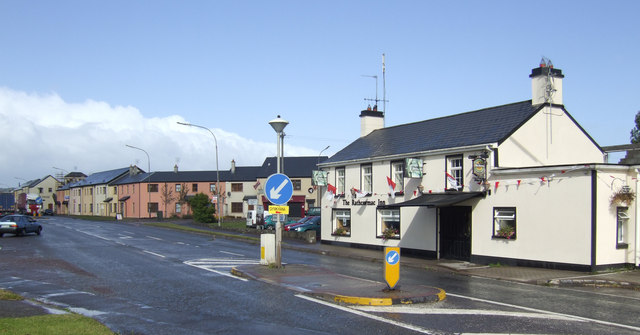
- The Rathcormac Inn, near where the R614 and R639 meet

Route information
- Length: 29.9 km (18.6 mi)

Major junctions
- From: R639 Rathcormac
- Passes over M8; Crosses River Bride; Crosses Glashaboy River; R616 White's Cross; R635 North Ring Road
- To: N8 Cork (MacCurtain Street)

Location
- Country: Ireland

Highway system
- Roads in Ireland; Motorways; Primary; Secondary; Regional

The R614 road is a regional road in Ireland, located in County Cork.
