= Cork City (barony) =

Barony in County Cork, Ireland

Cork City (Irish: Cathair Chorcaí (Note: Cork City)) is a barony in County Cork, Ireland. It contains seven civil parishes.

== Legal context ==
Baronies were created after the Norman invasion of Ireland as divisions of counties and were used the administration of justice and the raising of revenue. While baronies continue to be officially defined units, they have been administratively obsolete since 1898. However, they continue to be used in land registration and in specification, such as in planning permissions. In many cases, a barony corresponds to an earlier Gaelic túath which had submitted to the Crown.

== Location ==
The barony formed the medieval heart of the city but must be distinguished from the similar-sounding Barony of Cork which is a separate entity that surrounds the Barony of Cork City. The present city of Cork takes in both baronies. The estuary of the River Lee at its confluence with the River Glashaboy at Glanmire forms the boundary with the Barony of Barrymore. North of the Lee, a single civil parish - Rathcooney - in the Barony of Cork, separates the barony from that of Barrymore. At all other points, the Barony of Cork envelopes the Barony of Cork City.

== Civil parishes ==
North of the Lee:

- St. Mary's, Shandon
- St. Anne's, Shandon

South of the Lee:

- Holy Trinity
- St. Peter's
- St. Paul's
- St. Finbar's
- St. Nicholas

== See also ==
- List of civil parishes of County Cork
- Cork City Council
