= Kinalea =

Barony in County Cork, Ireland

Kinalea Cineál Aodha (Irish)
- Barony
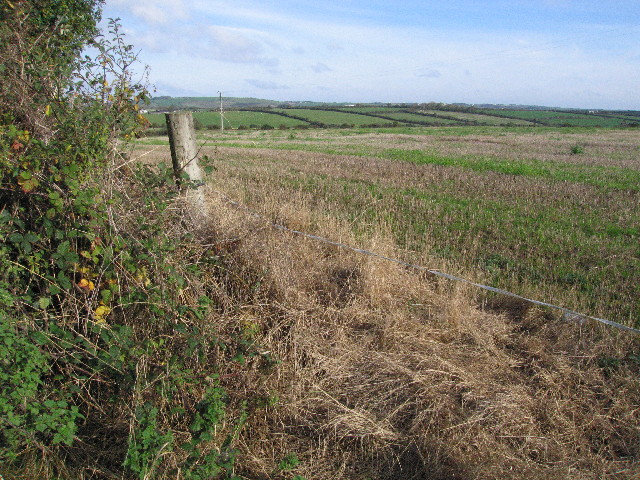
- Fields in Knocklucy

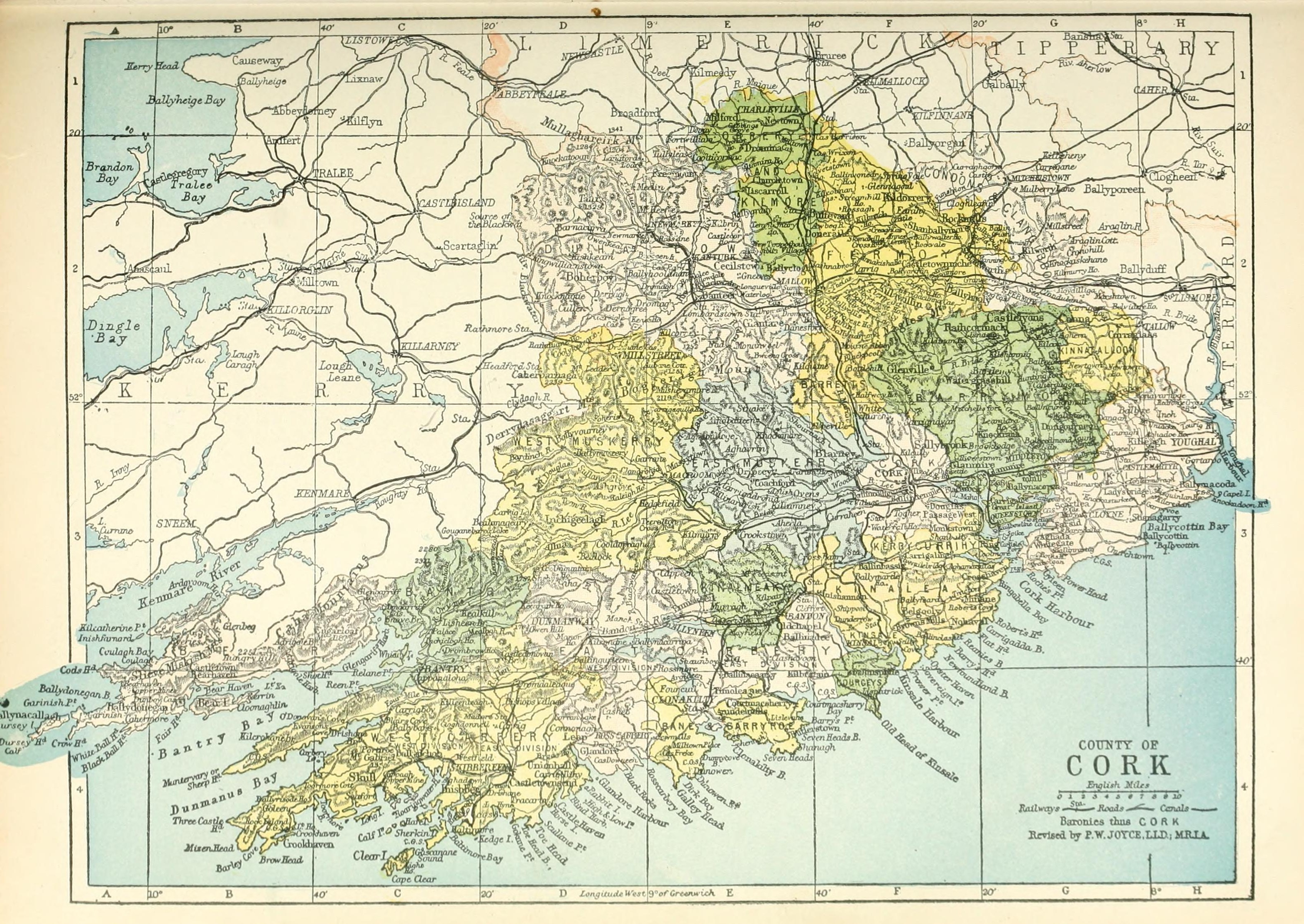
- Barony map of County Cork, 1900; Kinalea barony is in the centre, coloured yellow.

- Location within County Cork
- Coordinates: 51°48′N 8°30′W
- Sovereign state: Ireland
- Province: Munster
- County: Cork

Area
  - Total: 205.1 km^{2} (79.2 sq mi)

Kinalea (Irish: Cineál Aodha) is a historical barony in central County Cork, Ireland.

Baronies were mainly cadastral rather than administrative units. They acquired modest local taxation and spending functions in the 19th century before being superseded by the Local Government (Ireland) Act 1898.

== History and legend ==
The name means "Áed's kind," referring to Áed Duib ("Áed the black [haired]"), the father of Faílbe Flann mac Áedo Duib and Fíngen mac Áedo Duib, who were both Kings of Munster in the 7th century AD.

Part of Kinalea was under Viking control in the 10th–11th centuries.

It is mentioned in the Annals of the Four Masters for 1601:

A Spanish fleet arrived in the south of Ireland. Don Juan de Aguila was the name of the chief who was general over them. The place at which they put in was the harbour of Kinsale, at the mouth of the green river of Bandon, on the confines of Courcy's country on the one side, and Kinalea, the country of Barry Oge, on the other.

Barry Oge ("young Barry") a title given to the head of the local branch of the de Barry family, to distinguish them from Barry Mór ("Great Barry") who ruled the larger territory of Barrymore.

In the Down Survey, Kinalea was united with Kerrycurrihy, but by 1821 they were separate baronies.

A report of 1845 said that the southern part of Kinalea was tillage, while there was a substantial amount of dairy farming in the north. Sand, lime, seaweed and dung were used as fertiliser.

== Geography ==
Kinalea is a strip of coastal land in the centre of County Cork, between Kinsale Harbour and Cork Harbour.

== List of settlements ==
Settlements within the historical barony of Kinalea include:

- Belgooly
- Crossbarry
- Nohoval
- Riverstick
- Upton

== See also ==
- List of townlands of the barony of Kinalea
