= List of townlands of the barony of Kinalea =

This is a sortable table of the townlands in the barony of Kinalea, County Cork, Ireland. Duplicate names occur where there is more than one townland with the same name in the barony, and also where a townland is known by two alternative names. Names marked in bold typeface are towns and villages, and the word Town appears for those entries in the area column.

== Townland list ==
Townland	Area (acres)	Barony	Civil parish	Poor law union
Annacarriga	157	Kinalea	Tracton	Kinsale
Annagh Beg	158	Kinalea	Dunderrow	Kinsale
Annagh More	468	Kinalea	Inishannon	Bandon
Annefield	140	Kinalea	Kinure	Kinsale
Ardnaboha	81	Kinalea	Kilmonoge	Kinsale
Arlinstown	418	Kinalea	Ballymartle	Kinsale
Ballady	615	Kinalea	Cullen	Kinsale
Ballinaboy	1,149	Kinalea	Ballinaboy	Kinsale
Ballindeasig	198	Kinalea	Nohaval	Kinsale
Ballindeasig	464	Kinalea	Ballyfoyle	Kinsale
Ballindeenisk	416	Kinalea	Kilmonoge	Kinsale
Ballindresrough	76	Kinalea	Ballymartle	Kinsale
Ballingarry East	338	Kinalea	Ballyfeard	Kinsale
Ballingarry Middle	322	Kinalea	Ballyfeard	Kinsale
Ballingarry West	408	Kinalea	Ballyfeard	Kinsale
Ballingeemanigbeg	35	Kinalea	Kilmonoge	Kinsale
Ballinlining	75	Kinalea	Carrigaline	Kinsale
Ballinluig East	233	Kinalea	Ballyfeard	Kinsale
Ballinluig West	332	Kinalea	Ballyfeard	Kinsale
Ballinreenlanig	102	Kinalea	Nohaval	Kinsale
Ballinreenlanig	102	Kinalea	Nohaval	Kinsale
Ballintober	251	Kinalea	Ballymartle	Kinsale
Ballintrideen	232	Kinalea	Ballyfeard	Kinsale
Ballinvarosig	203	Kinalea	Carrigaline	Kinsale
Ballinvarrig	392	Kinalea	Tracton	Kinsale
Ballinvologe	220	Kinalea	Ballyfoyle	Kinsale
Ballinvragnosig	239	Kinalea	Cullen	Kinsale
Ballinwillin	11	Kinalea	Nohaval	Kinsale
Ballinwillin	112	Kinalea	Kinure	Kinsale
Ballybogey	183	Kinalea	Nohaval	Kinsale
Ballycoghlan	266	Kinalea	Inishannon	Bandon
Ballydonaghy	223	Kinalea	Leighmoney	Kinsale
Ballyfoyle	382	Kinalea	Ballyfoyle	Kinsale
Ballyhamsane	262	Kinalea	Ballyfeard	Kinsale
Ballyhandle	398	Kinalea	Knockavilly	Bandon
Ballyheedy	263	Kinalea	Ballinaboy	Kinsale
Ballyherkin Lower	30	Kinalea	Nohaval	Kinsale
Ballyherkin Upper	38	Kinalea	Nohaval	Kinsale
Ballyhullen Keague	47	Kinalea	Nohaval	Kinsale
Ballymartle	317	Kinalea	Ballymartle	Kinsale
Ballymurphy North	506	Kinalea	Knockavilly	Bandon
Ballymurphy South	532	Kinalea	Knockavilly	Bandon
Ballynabearna	533	Kinalea	Ballinaboy	Kinsale
Ballynacourty	614	Kinalea	Cullen	Kinsale
Ballynalougha	161	Kinalea	Nohaval	Kinsale
Ballynalouhy	371	Kinalea	Ballymartle	Kinsale
Ballynamaul	282	Kinalea	Ringcurran	Kinsale
Ballynoe	195	Kinalea	Ballyfeard	Kinsale
Ballyregan Beg	188	Kinalea	Ringcurran	Kinsale
Ballyregan More	434	Kinalea	Ringcurran	Kinsale
Ballyvorane	175	Kinalea	Ballyfoyle	Kinsale
Ballyvorane North	161	Kinalea	Nohaval	Kinsale
Ballyvorane South	312	Kinalea	Nohaval	Kinsale
Ballyvrin Upper	80	Kinalea	Dunderrow	Kinsale
Ballywilliam	207	Kinalea	Cullen	Kinsale
Barna	429	Kinalea	Inishannon	Bandon
Bawnagoynig	104	Kinalea	Kinure	Kinsale
Bawngoula	13	Kinalea	Dunderrow	Kinsale
Bawnleigh	365	Kinalea	Ballymartle	Kinsale
**Belgooly**	Town	Kinalea	Kilmonoge	Kinsale
Boardee	600	Kinalea	Tracton	Kinsale
Boulaling	238	Kinalea	Cullen	Kinsale
Brinny	440	Kinalea	Brinny	Bandon
Britfieldstown	432	Kinalea	Ballyfoyle	Kinsale
Carhoo North	161	Kinalea	Ringcurran	Kinsale
Carhoo South	175	Kinalea	Ringcurran	Kinsale
Carrigeen	133	Kinalea	Cullen	Kinsale
Castletown	102	Kinalea	Kinure	Kinsale
Clashanimud	442	Kinalea	Brinny	Bandon
Clashroe	77	Kinalea	Kinure	Kinsale
Clogheen	249	Kinalea	Leighmoney	Kinsale
Clogheenduane	447	Kinalea	Templemichael	Kinsale
Clouracaun	244	Kinalea	Inishannon	Bandon
Coolcullitha	357	Kinalea	Templemichael	Kinsale
Cooleens	89	Kinalea	Kinure	Kinsale
Coolkirky	526	Kinalea	Ballymartle	Kinsale
Coolmoreen	391	Kinalea	Inishannon	Bandon
Coolnagaug	56	Kinalea	Kilmonoge	Kinsale
Coolsheskin	81	Kinalea	Dunderrow	Kinsale
Corruragh	339	Kinalea	Ballymartle	Kinsale
Crosses	143	Kinalea	Inishannon	Bandon
Cullen	480	Kinalea	Cullen	Kinsale
Curra	143	Kinalea	Ballymartle	Kinsale
Curra	253	Kinalea	Inishannon	Bandon
Curra	290	Kinalea	Kinure	Kinsale
Curravohill	127	Kinalea	Nohaval	Kinsale
Derrynagasha	426	Kinalea	Leighmoney	Kinsale
Doonavanig	495	Kinalea	Tracton	Kinsale
Dooneen North	102	Kinalea	Ballymartle	Kinsale
Dooneen South	149	Kinalea	Ballymartle	Kinsale
Dunbogey	464	Kinalea	Nohaval	Kinsale
**Dunderrow**	Town	Kinalea	Dunderrow	Kinsale
Dunkereen	454	Kinalea	Inishannon	Bandon
Durah	144	Kinalea	Ballymartle	Kinsale
Fahanalooscane	536	Kinalea	Ballymartle	Kinsale
Farlistown	708	Kinalea	Templemichael	Kinsale
Farlsitown	35	Kinalea	Ballymartle	Kinsale
Farnahoe	398	Kinalea	Inishannon	Bandon
Farranbrien East	649	Kinalea	Tracton	Kinsale
Farranbrien West	659	Kinalea	Tracton	Kinsale
Farraneen	50	Kinalea	Tracton	Kinsale
Fartha	524	Kinalea	Ballyfeard	Kinsale
Fountainstown	669	Kinalea	Kilpatrick	Kinsale
Garravesoge	327	Kinalea	Ballymartle	Kinsale
Garryhankard	325	Kinalea	Knockavilly	Bandon
Glinny	860	Kinalea	Cullen	Kinsale
Gortacluggy	13	Kinalea	Kilmonoge	Kinsale
Gortigrenane	466	Kinalea	Kilpatrick	Kinsale
Granig	744	Kinalea	Tracton	Kinsale
Horsehill Beg	26	Kinalea	Dunderrow	Kinsale
Horsehill More (North)	347	Kinalea	Dunderrow	Kinsale
Horsehill More (South)	19	Kinalea	Dunderrow	Kinsale
**Inishannon**	Town	Kinalea	Inishannon	Bandon
Kilbeg	175	Kinalea	Tracton	Kinsale
Kilboy	182	Kinalea	Ballyfeard	Kinsale
Killaminoge	551	Kinalea	Templemichael	Kinsale
Killeagh	74	Kinalea	Kinure	Kinsale
Killeen	280	Kinalea	Inishannon	Bandon
Killehagh	356	Kinalea	Kilmonoge	Kinsale
Killountaine	245	Kinalea	Inishannon	Bandon
Killowen	418	Kinalea	Ballyfoyle	Kinsale
Kilpatrick	201	Kinalea	Kilpatrick	Kinsale
Kinure	448	Kinalea	Kinure	Kinsale
Knockacullen	210	Kinalea	Kinure	Kinsale
Knockane	162	Kinalea	Ballymartle	Kinsale
Knockatoor	312	Kinalea	Kilpatrick	Kinsale
Knockleigh	379	Kinalea	Kilmonoge	Kinsale
Knocklucy	405	Kinalea	Ballinaboy	Kinsale
Knockmullane	183	Kinalea	Inishannon	Bandon
Knocknahowla Beg	182	Kinalea	Kilmonoge	Kinsale
Knocknahowla More	396	Kinalea	Kilmonoge	Kinsale
Knocknalurgan	124	Kinalea	Carrigaline	Kinsale
Knocknamanaugh	595	Kinalea	Tracton	Kinsale
Knocknanav	99	Kinalea	Kinure	Kinsale
Knocksmall	78	Kinalea	Dunderrow	Kinsale
Laharran	266	Kinalea	Tracton	Kinsale
Laherfineen	139	Kinalea	Inishannon	Bandon
Lahern	77	Kinalea	Leighmoney	Kinsale
Leighmoney Beg	143	Kinalea	Leighmoney	Kinsale
Leighmoney More	30	Kinalea	Leighmoney	Kinsale
Leighmoney More	321	Kinalea	Dunderrow	Kinsale
Lisfehill	302	Kinalea	Ballinaboy	Kinsale
Lissagroom	300	Kinalea	Knockavilly	Bandon
Lissanisky	485	Kinalea	Knockavilly	Bandon
Lissard	204	Kinalea	Leighmoney	Kinsale
Lissheeda	227	Kinalea	Leighmoney	Kinsale
Lybe	327	Kinalea	Kilmonoge	Kinsale
Mill-land	57	Kinalea	Ballymartle	Kinsale
**Minane**	Town	Kinalea	Tracton	Kinsale
Minane	106	Kinalea	Tracton	Kinsale
Mountlong	80	Kinalea	Kilmonoge	Kinsale
Mullagh	213	Kinalea	Ballymartle	Kinsale
Newborough	137	Kinalea	Kilmonoge	Kinsale
**Nohaval**	Town	Kinalea	Nohaval	Kinsale
Nohaval	344	Kinalea	Nohaval	Kinsale
Oysterhaven	48	Kinalea	Kilmonoge	Kinsale
**Pallas**	Town	Kinalea	Kinure	Kinsale
Piercetown	307	Kinalea	Cullen	Kinsale
Puckane	119	Kinalea	Ringcurran	Kinsale
Raheen	73	Kinalea	Ballinaboy	Kinsale
Rathnaruogy	421	Kinalea	Inishannon	Bandon
Rathroe	151	Kinalea	Ballinaboy	Kinsale
Reagrove	421	Kinalea	Ballyfoyle	Kinsale
Reaniesglen	195	Kinalea	Nohaval	Kinsale
Reanieshouse	186	Kinalea	Ballyfoyle	Kinsale
Rigsdale	686	Kinalea	Dunderrow	Kinsale
Ring East	103	Kinalea	Kinure	Kinsale
Ring West	86	Kinalea	Kinure	Kinsale
Ringabella	478	Kinalea	Tracton	Kinsale
Ringnanean	361	Kinalea	Kilmonoge	Kinsale
Ringroe	180	Kinalea	Ballyfoyle	Kinsale
Ringville	186	Kinalea	Kilmonoge	Kinsale
Robertstown	430	Kinalea	Ballyfeard	Kinsale
Scart	219	Kinalea	Ballymartle	Kinsale
Shanavally	175	Kinalea	Leighmoney	Kinsale
Shanavally	308	Kinalea	Ballymartle	Kinsale
Ship-pool	235	Kinalea	Leighmoney	Kinsale
Skanagore	261	Kinalea	Leighmoney	Kinsale
Skehanagh	381	Kinalea	Dunderrow	Kinsale
Slievegallane	461	Kinalea	Leighmoney	Kinsale
Slieveroe	351	Kinalea	Cullen	Kinsale
Sovereign Islands	1	Kinalea	Kinure	Kinsale
Springfield	186	Kinalea	Nohaval	Kinsale
Springfield	35	Kinalea	Tracton	Kinsale
Springhill	97	Kinalea	Tracton	Kinsale
Stookeen	81	Kinalea	Ballinaboy	Kinsale
Tonabuska	47	Kinalea	Kinure	Kinsale
Tooreen	146	Kinalea	Dunderrow	Kinsale
**Tracton**	Town	Kinalea	Tracton	Kinsale
Tubbrid	855	Kinalea	Tracton	Kinsale
Willowhill	298	Kinalea	Kilpatrick	Kinsale
