= List of townlands of the barony of Kinnatalloon =

This is a sortable table of the townlands in the barony of Kinnatalloon, County Cork, Ireland. Duplicate names occur where there is more than one townland with the same name in the barony, and also where a townland is known by two alternative names. Names marked in bold typeface are towns and villages, and the word Town appears for those entries in the area column.

== Townland list ==
Townland	Area (acres)	Barony	Civil parish	Poor law union
Aghern East	328	Kinnatalloon	Aghern	Fermoy
Aghern West	287	Kinnatalloon	Aghern	Fermoy
Ballinlegane	443	Kinnatalloon	Ballynoe	Fermoy
Ballinscurloge	633	Kinnatalloon	Ballynoe	Fermoy
Ballyanthony	273	Kinnatalloon	Mogeely	Youghal
Ballybride Lower	339	Kinnatalloon	Knockmourne	Fermoy
Ballybride Upper	342	Kinnatalloon	Knockmourne	Fermoy
Ballyclogh	112	Kinnatalloon	Mogeely	Fermoy
Ballycullane	236	Kinnatalloon	Mogeely	Fermoy
Ballyerrin	175	Kinnatalloon	Mogeely	Fermoy
Ballyknock	405	Kinnatalloon	Ballynoe	Fermoy
Ballyknock North	317	Kinnatalloon	Ballynoe	Fermoy
Ballyknock South	600	Kinnatalloon	Ballynoe	Fermoy
Ballyknockane	212	Kinnatalloon	Mogeely	Youghal
Ballylusky	612	Kinnatalloon	Aghern	Fermoy
Ballymacsimon	425	Kinnatalloon	Aghern	Fermoy
Ballymonteen	482	Kinnatalloon	Ballynoe	Fermoy
Ballynattin	373	Kinnatalloon	Ballynoe	Fermoy
**Ballynoe**	Town	Kinnatalloon	Ballynoe	Fermoy
Ballynoe	243	Kinnatalloon	Ballynoe	Fermoy
Belvidere	171	Kinnatalloon	Knockmourne	Fermoy
Blackpool	38	Kinnatalloon	Mogeely	Fermoy
Booladurragha North	289	Kinnatalloon	Ballynoe	Fermoy
Booladurragha South	270	Kinnatalloon	Ballynoe	Fermoy
Bridepark	81	Kinnatalloon	Knockmourne	Fermoy
Caher	226	Kinnatalloon	Mogeely	Youghal
Carrigeen East	320	Kinnatalloon	Knockmourne	Fermoy
Carrigeen West	135	Kinnatalloon	Knockmourne	Fermoy
Carrigeenhill	355	Kinnatalloon	Knockmourne	Fermoy
Carrigmore	282	Kinnatalloon	Knockmourne	Fermoy
Castleview	181	Kinnatalloon	Knockmourne	Fermoy
Clashaganniv	423	Kinnatalloon	Knockmourne	Fermoy
**Conna**	Town	Kinnatalloon	Knockmourne	Fermoy
Conna	466	Kinnatalloon	Knockmourne	Fermoy
Cooladurragh	185	Kinnatalloon	Knockmourne	Fermoy
Cullenagh	367	Kinnatalloon	Ballynoe	Fermoy
Curraglass East	62	Kinnatalloon	Mogeely	Fermoy
Curraglass West	97	Kinnatalloon	Mogeely	Fermoy
Curraheen	602	Kinnatalloon	Knockmourne	Fermoy
Frankfort	20	Kinnatalloon	Mogeely	Fermoy
Garraneribbeen	343	Kinnatalloon	Ballynoe	Fermoy
Garryantaggart	312	Kinnatalloon	Aghern	Fermoy
Garrycaheragh	383	Kinnatalloon	Aghern	Fermoy
Garryduff	578	Kinnatalloon	Clonmult	Fermoy
Glasshouse	245	Kinnatalloon	Mogeely	Fermoy
Glebe	4	Kinnatalloon	Knockmourne	Fermoy
Glenacroghery	308	Kinnatalloon	Mogeely	Youghal
Glenatore Lower	139	Kinnatalloon	Knockmourne	Fermoy
Glenatore Upper	173	Kinnatalloon	Knockmourne	Fermoy
Glengoura Lower	184	Kinnatalloon	Mogeely	Fermoy
Glengoura Upper	324	Kinnatalloon	Mogeely	Fermoy
Glenkeal	76	Kinnatalloon	Mogeely	Youghal
Glenreagh	343	Kinnatalloon	Ballynoe	Fermoy
Glentane	274	Kinnatalloon	Ballynoe	Fermoy
Glentrasna	284	Kinnatalloon	Aghern	Fermoy
Glentrasna North	219	Kinnatalloon	Aghern	Fermoy
Glentrasna South	220	Kinnatalloon	Aghern	Fermoy
Gortnafira	78	Kinnatalloon	Mogeely	Fermoy
Inchyallagh	8	Kinnatalloon	Mogeely	Fermoy
Kilclare Lower	109	Kinnatalloon	Knockmourne	Fermoy
Kilclare Upper	493	Kinnatalloon	Knockmourne	Fermoy
Kilcronat	516	Kinnatalloon	Mogeely	Youghal
Kilcronatmountain	385	Kinnatalloon	Mogeely	Youghal
Killasseragh	340	Kinnatalloon	Ballynoe	Fermoy
Killavarilly	372	Kinnatalloon	Knockmourne	Fermoy
Kilmacow	316	Kinnatalloon	Mogeely	Fermoy
Kilnafurrery	256	Kinnatalloon	Mogeely	Youghal
Kilphillibeen	535	Kinnatalloon	Ballynoe	Fermoy
Knockacool	404	Kinnatalloon	Mogeely	Youghal
Knockakeo	296	Kinnatalloon	Ballynoe	Fermoy
Knockanarrig	215	Kinnatalloon	Mogeely	Youghal
Knockastickane	164	Kinnatalloon	Knockmourne	Fermoy
Knocknagapple	293	Kinnatalloon	Aghern	Fermoy
Lackbrack	84	Kinnatalloon	Mogeely	Fermoy
Lacken	262	Kinnatalloon	Mogeely	Youghal
Lackenbehy	101	Kinnatalloon	Mogeely	Fermoy
Limekilnclose	41	Kinnatalloon	Mogeely	Lismore
Lisnabrin Lower	114	Kinnatalloon	Mogeely	Fermoy
Lisnabrin North	217	Kinnatalloon	Mogeely	Fermoy
Lisnabrin South	180	Kinnatalloon	Mogeely	Fermoy
Lisnabrinlodge	28	Kinnatalloon	Mogeely	Fermoy
Littlegrace	50	Kinnatalloon	Knockmourne	Lismore
Longueville North	355	Kinnatalloon	Ballynoe	Fermoy
Longueville South	271	Kinnatalloon	Ballynoe	Fermoy
Lyre	160	Kinnatalloon	Mogeely	Youghal
Lyre Mountain	360	Kinnatalloon	Mogeely	Youghal
Mogeely Lower	304	Kinnatalloon	Mogeely	Fermoy
Mogeely Upper	247	Kinnatalloon	Mogeely	Fermoy
Monagown	491	Kinnatalloon	Knockmourne	Fermoy
Monaloo	458	Kinnatalloon	Mogeely	Youghal
Mountprospect	102	Kinnatalloon	Mogeely	Fermoy
Park	119	Kinnatalloon	Aghern	Fermoy
Poundfields	15	Kinnatalloon	Mogeely	Fermoy
Rathdrum	336	Kinnatalloon	Ballynoe	Fermoy
Rathdrum	339	Kinnatalloon	Britway	Fermoy
Reanduff	318	Kinnatalloon	Mogeely	Youghal
Rearour North	208	Kinnatalloon	Mogeely	Youghal
Rearour South	223	Kinnatalloon	Mogeely	Youghal
Rosybower	105	Kinnatalloon	Mogeely	Fermoy
Sandyhill	263	Kinnatalloon	Mogeely	Youghal
Shanaboola	190	Kinnatalloon	Ballynoe	Fermoy
Shanakill Lower	244	Kinnatalloon	Mogeely	Fermoy
Shanakill Upper	244	Kinnatalloon	Mogeely	Fermoy
Slieveadoctor	260	Kinnatalloon	Mogeely	Fermoy
Templevally	330	Kinnatalloon	Mogeely	Fermoy
Vinepark	7	Kinnatalloon	Mogeely	Fermoy
Woodview	36	Kinnatalloon	Mogeely	Fermoy
