= Mourne Abbey =

Parish in County Cork, Ireland

Mourne Abbey Mainstir na Móna
- Parish
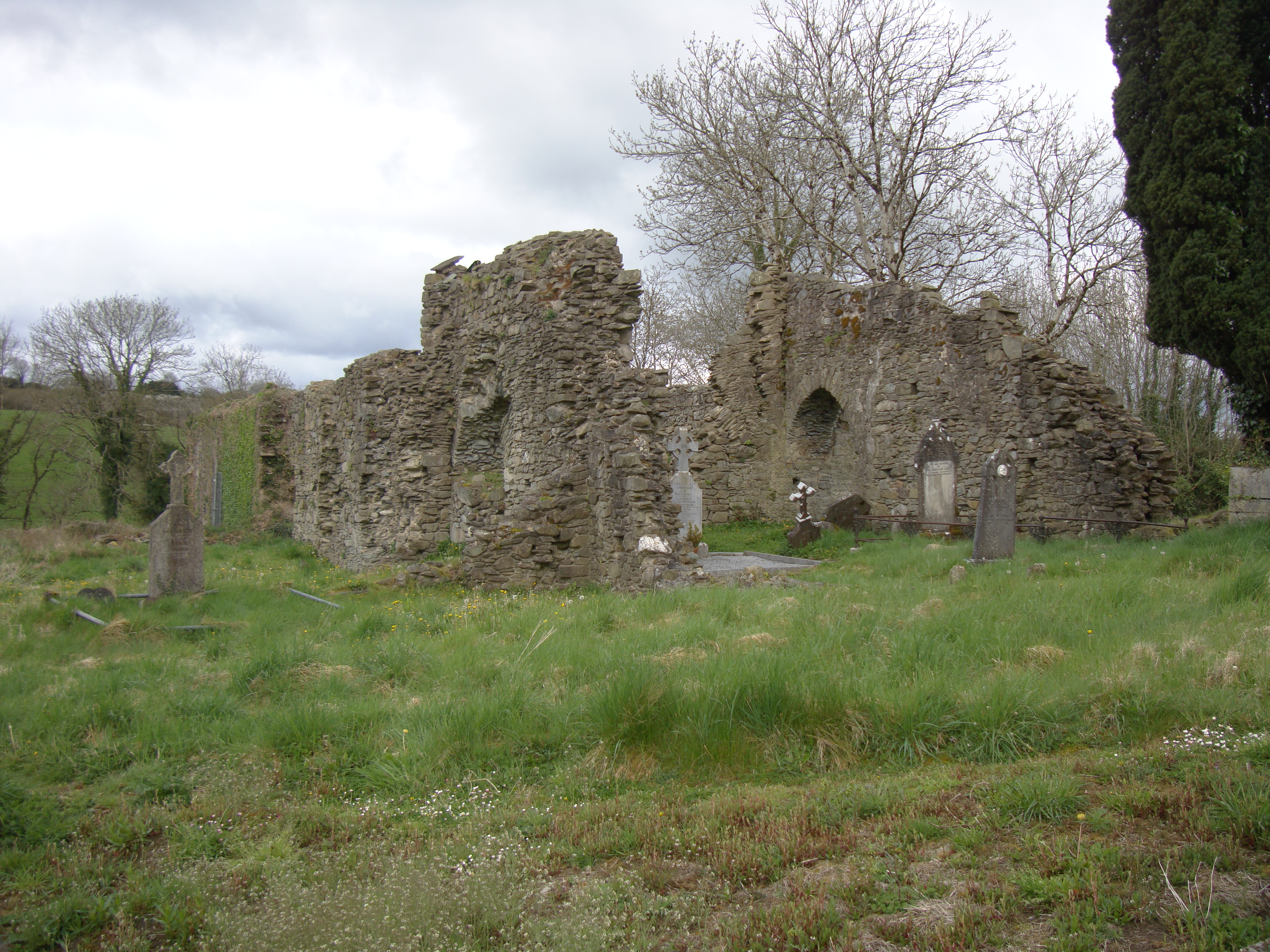
- Mourne Abbey

- Location in Ireland
- Coordinates: 52°08′N 8°39′W
- Country: Ireland
- Province: Munster
- County: County Cork
- Time zone: UTC+0 (WET)
  - Summer (DST): UTC-1 (IST (WEST))

Mourne Abbey, or Mourneabbey (Irish: Mainstir na Móna), is a small civil and Roman Catholic parish in the barony of Barretts, northwest County Cork, Ireland. The parish is situated just south of Mallow, on the main Mallow-Cork Road and Rail Line. The population of the parish is about 1,000 people. There are two churches and schools in the area, Analeentha and Burnfort. The civil parish consists of 17 townlands.

== History ==
In medieval times the area was known in Irish as An Mhóin Mhór (the Great Bog). After the abbey was founded, it was named Mainistir na Móna Móire (the abbey of the Great Bog). In medieval Latin documents it was usually referred to simply as Mora. It was formerly believed that the Abbey was built c. 1199 by the Knights Templar and later turned over to the Knights Hospitaller of St. John. The exact foundation date is not recorded but the earliest reference to it is 1290, when the 'master of Mora' witnessed a charter concerning Hospitaller properties in Dublin. Sections of the original enclosure walls with two towers still survive. The original enclosure was much larger but has been cut by modern roads and the railway embankment. Most of the original church is standing, and the large square tower at one corner of the enclosure is believed to have been a mill. In 1334 wardship of the ‘mill of Mora’ was granted to Christiana, wife of Henry Say, for a period of ten years. Another ruined building in the field south of the church may have been the monks' hall. The enclosure would have had a substantial gatehouse and a range of domestic and agricultural buildings including a refectory, an infirmary, a guesthouse, a dormitory, stables, brewhouse, forge and so on. The abbey came under the control of the McCarthys around 1500. It was closed down in 1541 after King Henry VIII ordered the dissolution of the monasteries and was granted by the crown to the McCarthys

This abbey now lies in ruins, as does Barrett's Castle, on the nearby hilltop. The castle was originally built by Cogans, the Anglo-Norman lords who founded the nearby town of Ballynamona and who donated the lands to the Hospitallers to build the abbey. The castle was said to have been destroyed by Cromwell’s forces, around 1651.

=== Irish War of Independence ===
The parish also played a role in the Irish War of Independence. A failed ambush of British forces occurred there near the abbey where a number of IRA volunteers were killed.

In early 1921, the IRA sought to destroy bridges, roads and make travel and communications difficult for British forces in the area. Near the end of January 1921, a specially formed Mallow Battalion (flying) moved into the Mourne Abbey area where they lay in ambush a few times, but the expected enemy did not turn up.

On the evening of 14 February 1921, word was received that column members were to report to a house near Mourne Abbey. Column member John Moloney, in his witness statement for the Bureau of Military History (WS 1,036), recalled that early in the morning of 15 February 1921, he and his comrades took up positions behind a stone-faced fence on high ground at the western side of the Mallow-Cork road overlooking the intended ambush point. The convoy to be attacked was escorting General Cummings, Officer in Command of Forces at Buttevant, to a meeting of officers in the Southern Command Area. Other armed IRA members gathered at Jordan's Bridge approximately one mile on the Cork side of Mourne Abbey Railway Station, with the intention to block traffic on the road. In all, 53 men reportedly rallied to the ambush in Mourne Abbey, including 43 from Mourne Abbey, mostly young farmers in their early 20s.

At around 11am on 15 February 1921, four or five military lorries approached on the main road from Cork. The first two lorries, which were about 100 yards in front of a third, passed by Jordan's Bridge and continued to a point approximately 150 yards beyond the bridge on the Mallow side. The military in the lorries opened fire on a man attempting to block the road with a cart. At the same time the lorries halted. A second cart was then pushed out and the man who pushed it got back to cover. The other military lorries were halted at this stage at the Cork side of Jordan's Bridge. The British troops on the left-hand side of the lorries jumped to the ground and crossed Jordan's Bridge. The military on the right-hand side of the lorries jumped to the ground and moved up through a high bank towards a farm at Mourneabbey and towards the positions of the IRA Burnfort company who were armed with shotguns. The British troops opened fire, killing two IRA volunteers, while up at Clogheen, troops shot the Creedon brothers killing one and wounding another. The IRA party then withdrew, in a westerly direction, until they reached Clashmorgan. They remained there for a few hours before returning to their home area.

The Mourne Abbey Ambush resulted in the death of four IRA men - three men Patrick Flynn, Monee (25), Patrick Dorgan (22), Island, and Edmond Creedon, Clogheen (20) were shot dead, whilst another man Michael Looney, Island (30) later died of his wounds. Several men were arrested, including Patrick Ronayne, Tomas Mulcahy, Con Mulcahy, Batt Riordan, and Michael Creedon, who were charged and tried by court martial at Cork Military Detention Barracks. Patrick Ronayne and Tomas Mulcahy were found guilty and executed on 28 April 1921. Their bodies were buried in the yard at Cork Prison. The other men were found not guilty due to lack of evidence. Major Compton Smith of the British army was kidnapped in Blarney and held in exchange for the IRA prisoners. But when Patrick Ronayne and Tomas Mulcahy had been executed, Smith was executed by the IRA.

Leakage regarding this engagement was attributed to a British ex-soldier who was a member of the Kanturk Battalion Column. Brigade Officer in Command Liam Lynch held an investigation into the Mourne Abbey ambush. Lynch was uncertain that British forces had some prior knowledge of the column’s engagement. He stated: "Poor leadership and indiscipline in the local unit seemed a more likely culprit."

== Transport ==
Mourne Abbey railway station was opened on 1 May 1892 and finally closed on 9 September 1963.

== People ==
- Tomás Mac Curtain, former Lord Mayor of Cork who was killed by British forces in 1920, was from Ballyknockane in the parish of Mourneabbey.
- Paul Bradford (b. 1963), former Fine Gael TD and former senator; husband of Lucinda Creighton.

== See also ==
- List of abbeys and priories in Ireland (County Cork)
