= R616 road (Ireland) =

Road in Ireland

Coordinates: 51.959762°N 8.416124°W

R616 road
- Bóthar R616
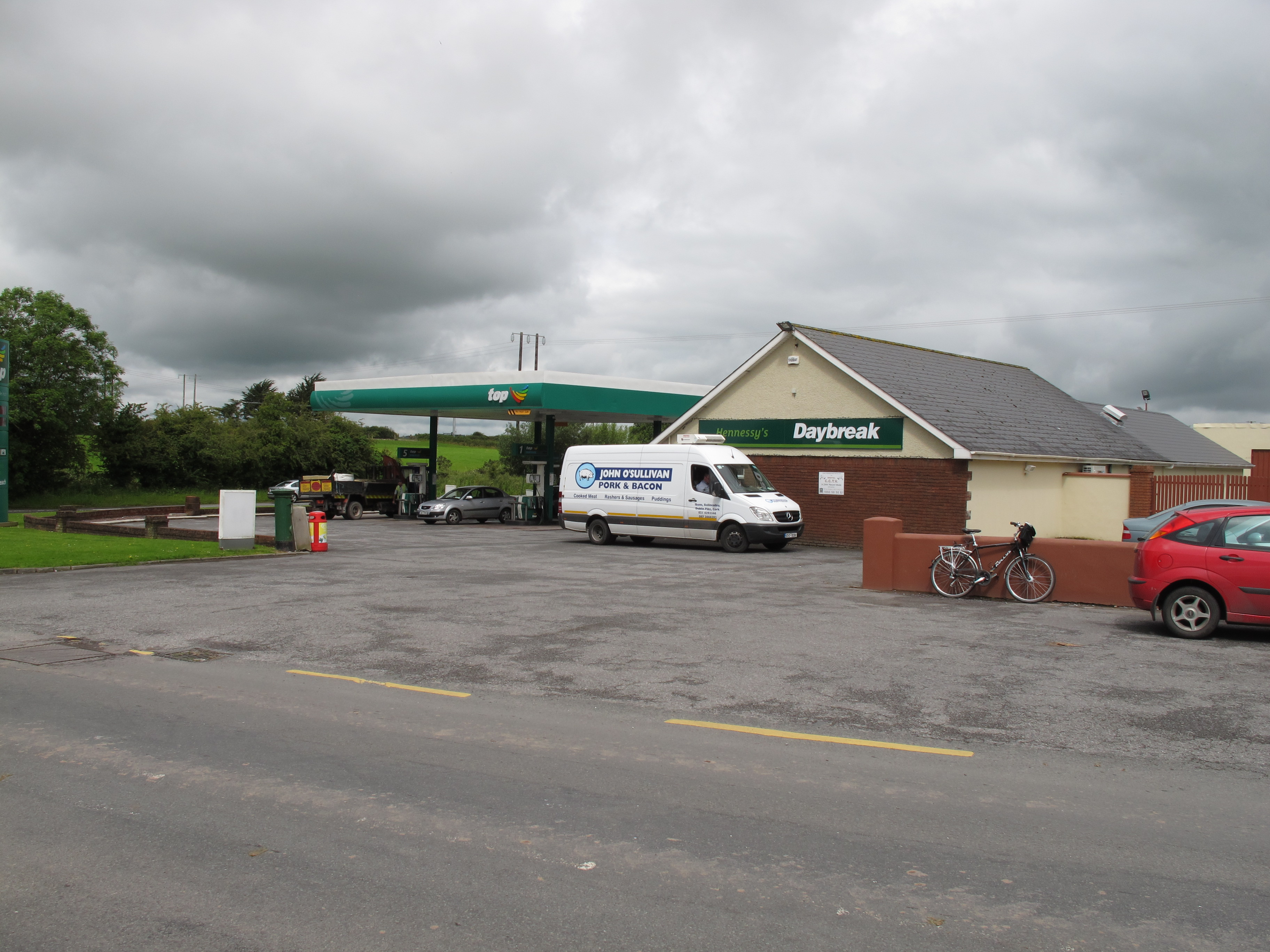
- White's Cross, County Cork, on the R616

Route information
- Length: 12.0 km (7.5 mi)

Major junctions
- From: R614 White's Cross
- Crosses Glashaboy River (Upper Glanmire Bridge)
- To: R639 Annacarton Bridge

Location
- Country: Ireland

Highway system
- Roads in Ireland; Motorways; Primary; Secondary; Regional

The R616 road is a regional road in County Cork, Ireland.
