= R635 road (Ireland) =

Regional road in Ireland

R635 road
- Bóthar R635

Route information
- Length: 4.6 km (2.9 mi)

Major junctions
- From: N20 at Moire McSwiney Bridge, Cork
- R614 at Ballyhooly New Road; R615 at Tinkers Cross
- To: N8 at Lower Glanmire Road, Cork

Location
- Country: Ireland

Highway system
- Roads in Ireland; Motorways; Primary; Secondary; Regional
← R634	→ R637

The R635 road, the Cork Northern Ring Road, is a regional road in County Cork, Ireland. It travels from the N20 road in Blackpool to the N8, via Mayfield. The road is 4.6 kilometres (2.9 mi) long.

== Cork Northern Distributor Multi-Modal Road ==
In 2025, plans for the "Cork Northern Distributor Multi-Modal Road", an outer ring road north of the existing R635, were published for public consultation. The new road, which has been the subject of objections from Glanmire residents, and praise from Cork businesspeople, would span c. 14 km, linking the Glanmire Road to the N22, 3 km west of Carrigrohane. The road could alleviate congestion around Apple Inc.'s European headquarters, with its 6,000 employees. Earlier plans from the National Transport Authority in 2020, showed the road meeting the N8 on Cork's east quays.
