= Water-rock =

Townland in County Cork, Ireland

Coordinates: 51.9249°N 8.2045°W

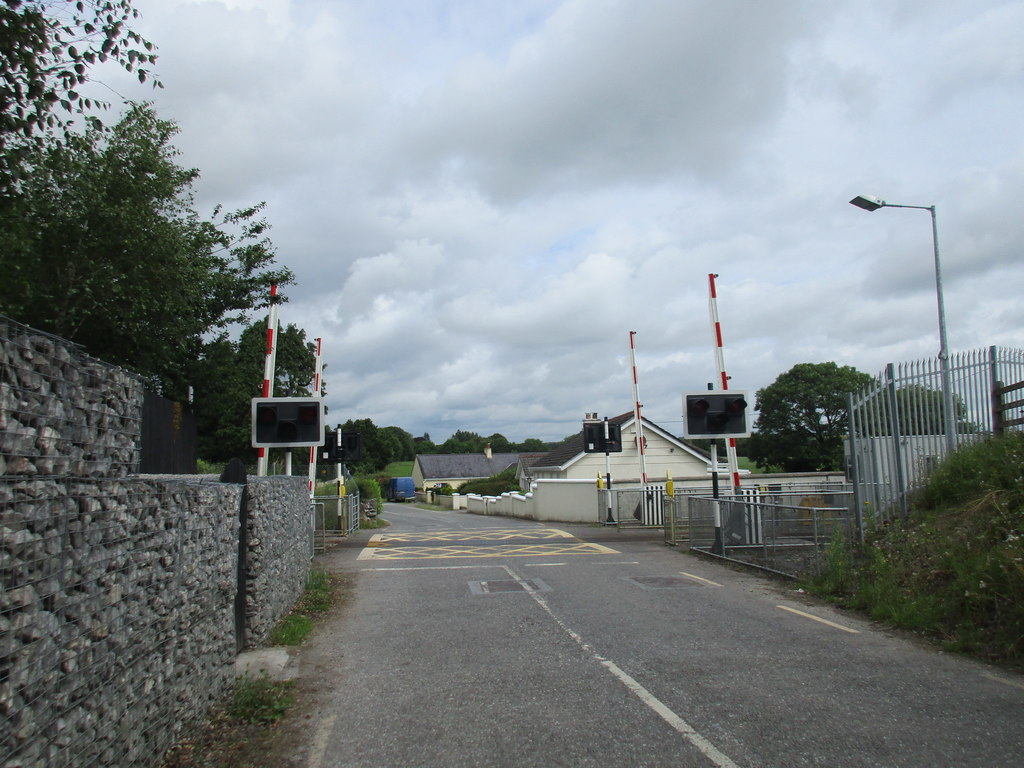
Level-crossing, near Water-rock, on the Cork-Midleton rail line

Water-rock (Irish: Carraig an Uisce) is a townland in the historical barony of Barrymore in County Cork, Ireland. Located in East Cork, near Midleton, the townland has an area of approximately 1.2 square kilometres (0.5 sq mi). While, at the time of the 2011 census, Water-rock had a population of 128 people, in 2015 Cork County Council published a plan for "significant" residential development in the area. The "Cork Metropolitan Area Transport Strategy 2040" (CMATS), a public consultation document published in 2019 by the National Transport Authority, listed Water-rock as one of several potential locations for a future Cork Suburban Rail station. As of late 2022, Cork Corporation had reportedly commenced some road and water infrastructure works in the area. Waterrock golf course closed in 2020.

== See also ==
- Monard, County Cork (a Cork townland also previously proposed as the site of a "new town" and station)
