= Kerrycurrihy =

Barony in County Cork, Ireland

Kerrycurrihy Ciarraí Cuirche (Irish)
- Barony
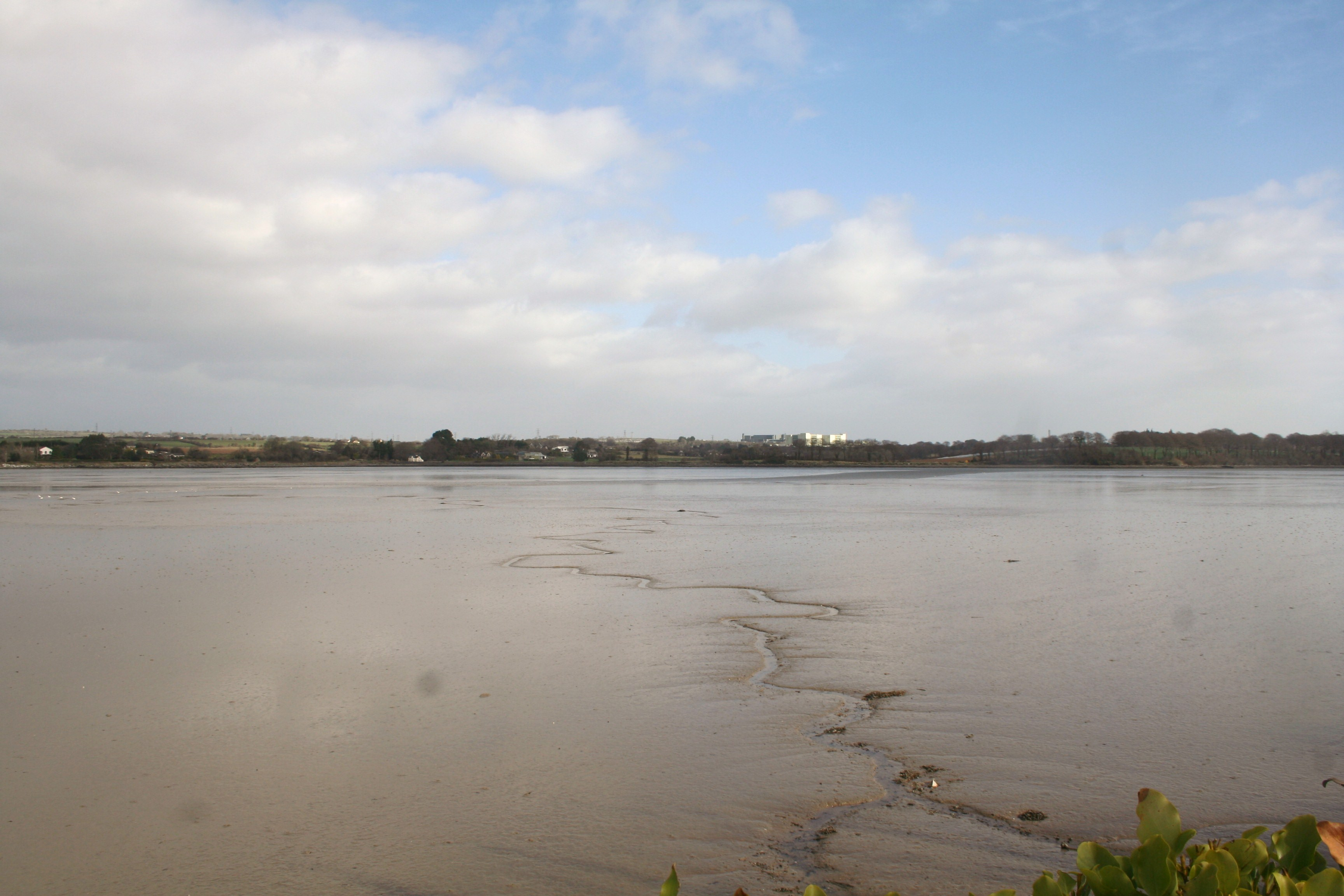
- Mudflats in Owenabue

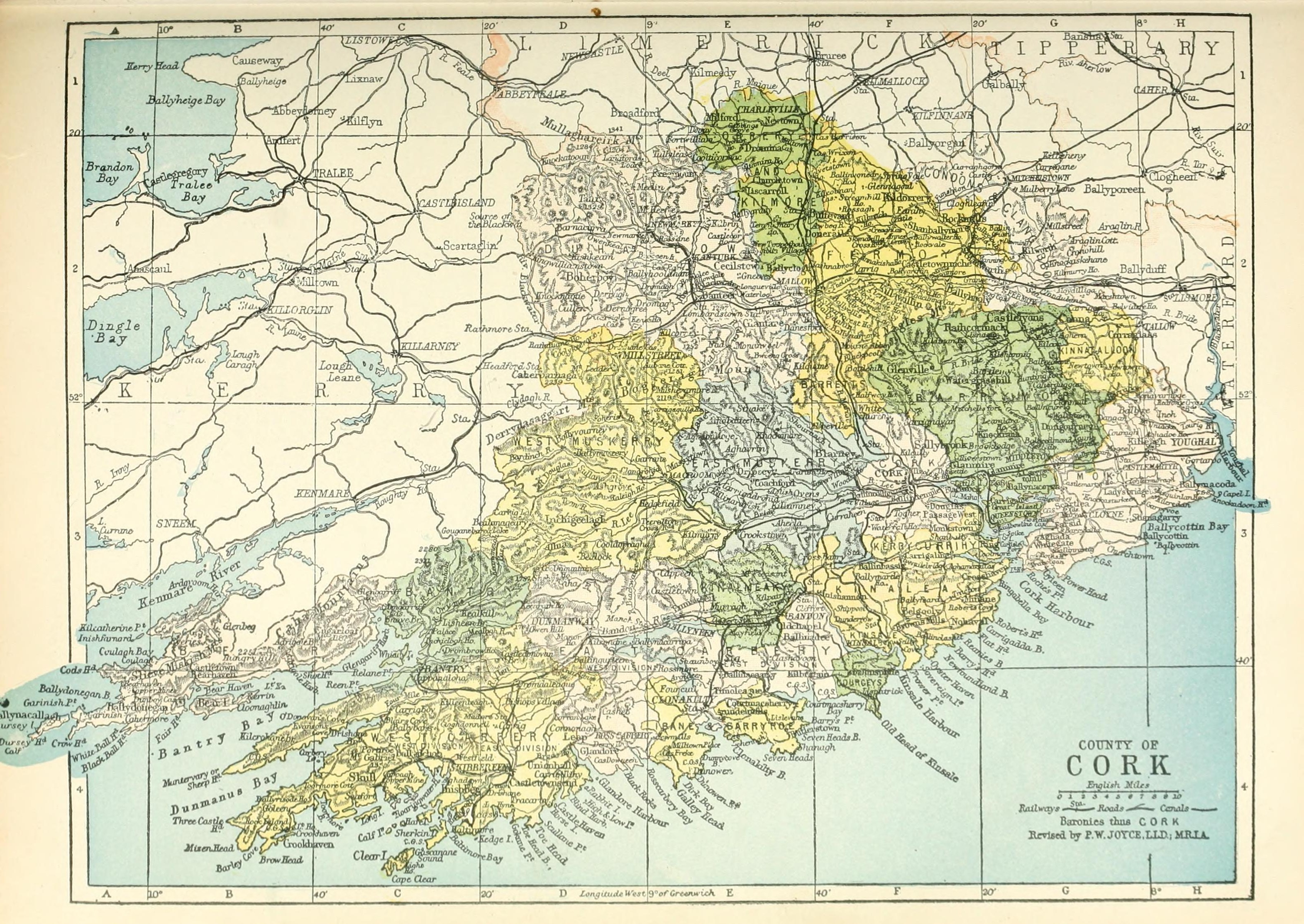
- Barony map of County Cork, 1900; Kerrycurrihy barony is in the south, coloured yellow.

- Location within County Cork
- Coordinates: 51°50′N 8°22′W
- Sovereign state: Ireland
- Province: Munster
- County: Cork

Area
  - Total: 97.0 km^{2} (37.5 sq mi)

Kerrycurrihy (Irish: Ciarraí Cuirche) is a historical barony in central County Cork, Ireland.

Baronies were mainly cadastral rather than administrative units. They acquired modest local taxation and spending functions in the 19th century before being superseded by the Local Government (Ireland) Act 1898.

== History and legend ==
This area was anciently part of Muskerry Ilane, which also included the Imokilly barony. This was a territory of the Múscraige people.

The legendary High King of Ireland Rudraige mac Sithrigi is said to have cleared twelve plains in Ireland, including Kerrycurrihy.

Kerrycurrihy takes its name from the Cíarraige Cuirche, a sept of the Cíarraige people who also give their name to County Kerry.

A biography of the 7th-century saint Mo Chutu of Lismore says that

One day Mochuda went to Kerrycurrihy, and found there in the district Corc, the king of Munster. There fell a fiery ball from the air, and killed the wife and son of the king, and two of his chariot horses. The king entreated Mochuda to raise them; and he did so with the grace of God.

The Annals of the Four Masters mentions that at the AD 908 Battle of Ballaghmoon, at which the bishop-king Cormac mac Cuilennáin was slain at the head of a large Munster army, among the Munster dead was "Fogartach the Wise, son of Suibhne, lord of Ciarraighe-Cuirche."

The O'Curry of Clan Torna were chiefs here.

Kerrycurrihy was the first place to be planted with English colonists in the Munster Plantation in the 1560s.

In the Down Survey, Kerrycurrihy was united with Kinalea, but by 1821 they were separate baronies.

== Geography ==
Kerrycurrihy is a strip of land in the centre of County Cork, north of Kinalea, south of Cork City, east of Muskerry and west of Cork Harbour.

== List of settlements ==
Settlements within the historical barony of Kerrycurrihy include:

- Ballinhassig
- Ballygarvan
- Carrigaline
- Crosshaven
- Monkstown
- Myrtleville
- Passage West
- Ringaskiddy
- Shanbally

== See also ==
- List of townlands of the barony of Kerrycurrihy
