= Conna =

Village in County Cork, Ireland

Conna Conaithe
- Village
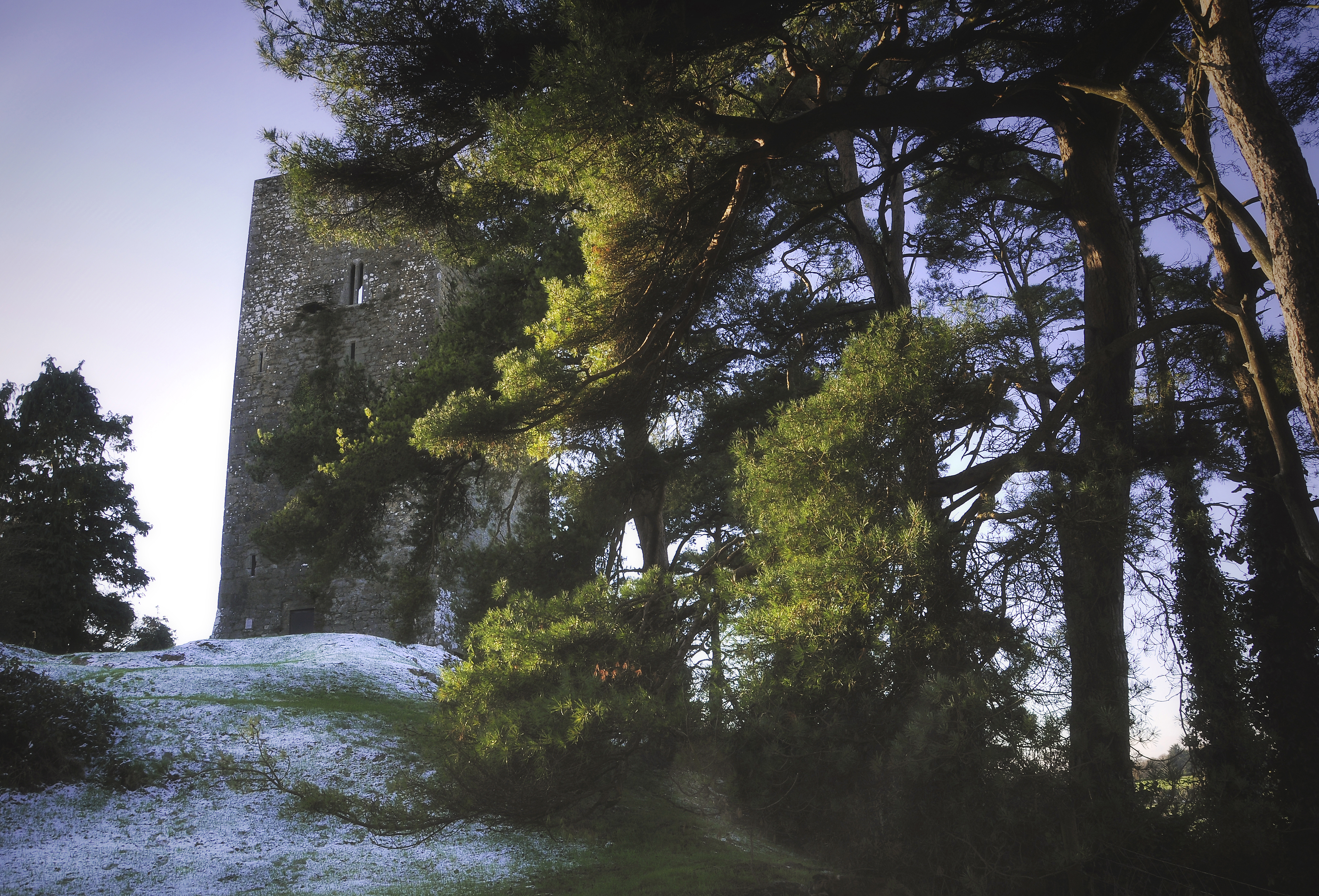
- Conna Castle viewed from the east

- Location in Ireland
- Coordinates: 52°05′34″N 08°06′36″W
- Country: Ireland
- Province: Munster
- County: County Cork

Population (2022)
  - Total: 609
- Time zone: UTC+0 (WET)
  - Summer (DST): UTC-1 (IST (WEST))

Conna (Irish: Conaithe) is a village in County Cork, Ireland. It is situated on the River Bride, southeast of the town of Fermoy, on the R628 regional road. The village contains several pubs, a shop, a post office, a Roman Catholic church (built c. 1820) and a nearby Church of Ireland chapel. The village is dominated by Conna Castle, a five-story tower house situated on a limestone outcrop near the river.

== History ==
Evidence of ancient settlement in the area includes a number of ringfort, standing stone and fulacht fiadh sites in the townlands of Conna, Clashaganniv, Curraheen and Kilclare.

During the mid-16th century, the Fitzgeralds, Earls of Desmond, built Conna Castle on a high limestone rock overlooking the River Bride. The castle and its estate was seized by the English and passed into the hands of Walter Raleigh, the English settler. The rightful heir to the castle, James FitzThomas (the Sugán Earl) staged an unsuccessful attempt to capture the castle. The castle then went through a series of different owners before ending up in the hands of the Earl of Cork. It is believed that Oliver Cromwell passed by the castle and fired cannons at it before moving on. In 1653, the castle suffered a fire in which three of the steward's daughters were killed. The castle continued to move from owner to owner until Hilary L'Estrange purchased the castle in 1851. He passed it on to his son, Rev A. G. K. L'Estrange, on whose death in 1915, the castle was willed into the care of the state.

== Notable people ==
- Liam Kearney (born 1983), professional footballer and coach
- Angela Lansbury (1925–2022), actor and producer, moved to the area with her husband Peter Shaw and lived in a 19th-century farmhouse named Knockmourne Glebe.
- Bartholomew MacCarthy (1843–1904), Irish historian

== See also ==
- List of towns and villages in Ireland
