= Barrymore (barony) =

Barony in County Cork, Ireland

Barrymore (Irish: Barraigh Mhóra (Note: Barrymore)) is a barony in County Cork in Ireland. It is the namesake of the Norman de Barry family, latterly created Earls of Barrymore. Barrymore is bordered by eight baronies:

- To the south-west, the Barony of Cork and the Barony of Cork City
- to the west, the Barony of Barretts
- To the north-west, Duhallow
- To the north, the Barony of Fermoy
- To the north-east, Condons and Clangibbon
- To the east, Kinnataloon
- To the south-east, Imokilly

It stretches from the Nagle Mountains in the north, through the valley of the River Bride, to the north shore of Cork Harbour, including Little Island, Great Island, and Haulbowline Island.

== Legal context ==
Baronies were created after the Norman invasion as subdivisions of counties and were used for administration. Baronies continue to be regarded as officially defined units, but they are no longer used for many administrative purposes. While they have been administratively obsolete since 1898, they continue to be used in land registration and specification such as in planning permissions. In many cases, a barony corresponds to an earlier Gaelic túath which had submitted to the Crown.

The ancestor of the De Barry family in Ireland, Philip de Barry, received from his uncle, Robert Fitz-Stephen, a grant of three cantreds in his own half of the Kingdom of Desmond ("the kingdom of Cork") viz. Olethan, Muschiri-on-Dunnegan (or Muskerry Donegan) and Killyde (or Killede) by the service of ten knights. These cantreds became the baronies or hundreds of Oliehan, Oryrry and Ogormliehan respectively. The name "Oliehan" is an anglicisation of the Gaelic Uí Liatháin which refers to the early medieval kingdom of the Uí Liatháin. This petty kingdom encompassed most of the land in Barrymore and the neighbouring barony of Kinnatalloon. Oryrry is currently known as the Barony of Orrery and Kilmore. The name Killyde survives in "Killeady Hills", the name of the hill country south of the city of Cork. According to Rev. Barry, the baronies were

"coextensive with the ecclesiastical deaneries of Olethan and Muscry Donnegan in the diocese of Cloyne, and Ocurblethan, in the diocese of Cork.

== Civil parishes and settlements ==
Settlements in the barony include Bartlemy, (Note: Barrymore: population centres) Castlelyons, (Note: Barrymore: towns) Carrignavar, Carrigtohill, Cóbh, (Note: Barrymore: features) Glounthaune, Bridebridge, Midleton, Rathcormack, and Watergrasshill.

== See also ==
- List of civil parishes of County Cork
- List of townlands of the barony of Barrymore
