= River Bride =

River in Counties Cork and Waterford, Ireland, tributary of the Munster Blackwater)

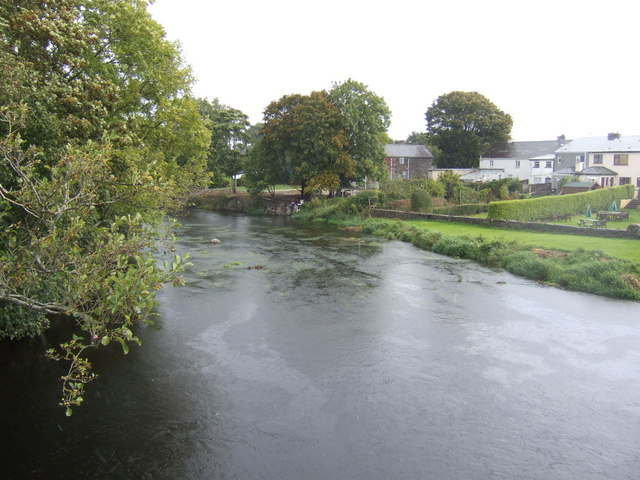
- River Bride at Conna, County Cork
- Native name: An Bhríd (Irish)

Location
- Country: Ireland

Physical characteristics
- Source
  - location: Commons, County Cork
- Mouth: Munster Blackwater
  - location: Camphire, County Waterford
- Length: 64 km (40 mi)
- Basin size: 419 km^{2} (162 sq mi)

The River Bride (Irish: An Bhríd) is a river in counties Cork and Waterford in Ireland. It is a tributary of the Munster Blackwater. Rising in the Nagle Mountains, it flows eastward, passing through the towns of Rathcormac, Castlelyons, Conna and Tallow, before joining the Blackwater at Camphire, approximately 3 miles (4.8 km) north of Youghal. The English poet Edmund Spenser is reputed to have written part of his poem "The Faerie Queene" on the banks of the Bride in the Conna area. The river runs through the baronies of Barrymore and Imokilly. The river is tidal up to Tallow Bridge.

Bride Rovers GAA from Rathcormac and Bartlemy is named after this river.
