= List of townlands of County Louth =

This is a sortable table of the approximately 676 townlands in County Louth, Ireland. A plain version of this list showing townland names only is also available for easy alphabetical navigation and convenient overview.

Duplicate names occur where there is more than one townland with the same name in the county. Names marked in bold typeface are towns and villages, and the word Town appears for those entries in the Acres column.

== Townland list ==
Townland	Acres	Barony	Civil parish	Poor law union
Acarreagh	106	Upper Dundalk	Castletown	Dundalk
Aclint	367	Ardee	Philipstown	Ardee
Adamstown	311	Ardee	Drumcar	Ardee
Aghaboys	277	Lower Dundalk	Ballymascanlan	Dundalk
Aghameen	343	Lower Dundalk	Ballymascanlan	Dundalk
Aghnaskeagh	321	Lower Dundalk	Ballymascanlan	Dundalk
Allardstown	82	Upper Dundalk	Dunbin	Dundalk
Allardstown	596	Louth	Killincoole	Dundalk
Almondtown	378	Ferrard	Clogher	Drogheda
Anaglog	373	Ardee	Kildemock	Ardee
Anaverna (or Ravensdale Park)	2,343	Lower Dundalk	Ballymascanlan	Dundalk
**Annagassan**	Town	Ardee	Drumcar	Ardee
Annagh	73	Ardee	Philipstown	Ardee
Annagh Boltons	150	Louth	Louth	Dundalk
Annagh McCann's	191	Louth	Louth	Dundalk
Annaghanmoney	61	Ardee	Louth	Dundalk
Annaghminnan	65	Louth	Louth	Dundalk
Annaghvacky	369	Upper Dundalk	Creggan	Dundalk
Annaloughan	1,078	Lower Dundalk	Ballymascanlan	Dundalk
Annies	129	Lower Dundalk	Ballymascanlan	Dundalk
Ardagh	120	Ferrard	Tullyallen	Drogheda
Ardaghy	443	Lower Dundalk	Carlingford	Dundalk
Ardballan	333	Ferrard	Clonmore	Drogheda
Ardbolies	197	Ferrard	Rathdrumin	Drogheda
**Ardee**	Town	Ardee	Ardee	Ardee
Ardee	80	Ardee	Ardee	Ardee
Ardlaraghan	101	Ardee	Mosstown	Ardee
Ardpatrick	174	Louth	Louth	Dundalk
Ardtully Beg	54	Lower Dundalk	Carlingford	Dundalk
Ardtully More	99	Lower Dundalk	Carlingford	Dundalk
Arthurstown	502	Ardee	Tallanstown	Ardee
Arthurstown Little	73	Ardee	Tallanstown	Ardee
Artnalevery	278	Ardee	Charlestown	Ardee
Artoney	147	Louth	Louth	Dundalk
Ash Big	144	Louth	Louth	Dundalk
Ash Little	191	Louth	Louth	Dundalk
Athclare	271	Ferrard	Dunleer	Ardee
Babeswood	100	Louth	Dromiskin	Dundalk
Baggotstown	165	Ferrard	Rathdrumin	Drogheda
Bailyland	34	Louth	Louth	Dundalk
Bailypark	28	Drogheda	St. Peter's	Drogheda
Balfeddock	116	Ferrard	Termonfeckin	Drogheda
Balgatheran	482	Ferrard	Tullyallen	Drogheda
Ballabony	270	Ardee	Clonkeen	Ardee
Ballagan	470	Lower Dundalk	Carlingford	Dundalk
Ballaverty	214	Lower Dundalk	Carlingford	Dundalk
Ballinclare	57	Upper Dundalk	Louth	Dundalk
Ballinfuil	369	Upper Dundalk	Roche	Dundalk
Ballinlough	147	Upper Dundalk	Louth	Dundalk
Ballinloughan	211	Louth	Louth	Dundalk
Ballinreask	49	Ferrard	Beaulieu	Drogheda
Ballinteskin	607	Lower Dundalk	Carlingford	Dundalk
Ballinurd	219	Upper Dundalk	Barronstown	Dundalk
Ballsgrove	26	Drogheda, Muni. Borough of	St. Mary's	Drogheda
Ballug	147	Lower Dundalk	Carlingford	Dundalk
Ballybailie	324	Ardee	Ardee	Ardee
Ballybarrack	428	Upper Dundalk	Ballybarrack	Dundalk
Ballybinaby	485	Upper Dundalk	Roche	Dundalk
Ballydonnell	164	Ferrard	Termonfeckin	Drogheda
Ballygoly	187	Lower Dundalk	Ballymascanlan	Dundalk
Ballygowan	314	Ardee	Shanlis	Ardee
Ballymageragh	179	Ardee	Cappoge	Ardee
Ballymaglane	156	Ferrard	Termonfeckin	Drogheda
Ballymakellett	1,148	Lower Dundalk	Ballymascanlan	Dundalk
Ballymakenny	421	Drogheda	Ballymakenny	Drogheda
Ballymascanlan	210	Lower Dundalk	Ballymascanlan	Dundalk
Ballynagassan	174	Ardee	Drumcar	Ardee
Ballynagrena	123	Ferrard	Dysart	Drogheda
Ballynahattin	105	Upper Dundalk	Dundalk	Dundalk
Ballynamaghery	184	Lower Dundalk	Carlingford	Dundalk
Ballynamony, Bradshaw	106	Lower Dundalk	Carlingford	Dundalk
Ballynamony, Murphy	175	Lower Dundalk	Carlingford	Dundalk
Ballyonan	851	Lower Dundalk	Carlingford	Dundalk
Ballyoran	237	Louth	Louth	Dundalk
Ballyregan	88	Ardee	Killanny	Dundalk
Ballytrasna	36	Lower Dundalk	Carlingford	Dundalk
Ballytrasna	52	Ardee	Killanny	Dundalk
Balregan	184	Upper Dundalk	Castletown	Dundalk
Balriggan	437	Upper Dundalk	Faughart	Dundalk
Balrobin	214	Upper Dundalk	Barronstown	Dundalk
Baltrasna	247	Ardee	Ardee	Ardee
**Baltray**	Town	Ferrard	Termonfeckin	Drogheda
Baltray	436	Ferrard	Termonfeckin	Drogheda
Bankerstown	68	Ferrard	Mullary	Drogheda
Banktown	185	Ferrard	Beaulieu	Drogheda
Barabona	293	Ferrard	Monasterboice	Drogheda
Barmeath	312	Ferrard	Dysart	Drogheda
Barnaveddoge	93	Ardee	Dromin	Ardee
Barronstown	513	Upper Dundalk	Barronstown	Dundalk
Battsland	49	Ferrard	Dunleer	Ardee
Bavan	514	Lower Dundalk	Carlingford	Dundalk
Bawn	220	Louth	Mansfieldstown	Ardee
Bawntaaffe	280	Ferrard	Monasterboice	Drogheda
Beaulieu	464	Ferrard	Beaulieu	Drogheda
Begrath	521	Ferrard	Tullyallen	Drogheda
Bellcotton	123	Ferrard	Termonfeckin	Drogheda
Bellurgan	1,435	Lower Dundalk	Ballyboys	Dundalk
Bellurgan	562	Lower Dundalk	Castletown	Dundalk
Belpatrick	1,513	Ferrard	Collon	Ardee
Beltichburne	196	Ferrard	Beaulieu	Drogheda
Benagh	233	Lower Dundalk	Carlingford	Dundalk
Betaghstown	175	Ferrard	Termonfeckin	Drogheda
Bigsland	18	Ardee	Smarmore	Ardee
**Black Rock**	Town	Upper Dundalk	Haggardstown	Dundalk
Blackhall	173	Ferrard	Termonfeckin	Drogheda
Blackstick	66	Ardee	Ardee	Ardee
Blakestown	381	Ardee	Shanlis	Ardee
Bogtown	273	Ardee	Mapastown	Ardee
Boharnamoe	390	Ardee	Ardee	Ardee
Bolies	299	Ardee	Kilsaran	Ardee
Boycetown	202	Ferrard	Port	Drogheda
Braganstown	1,266	Ardee	Stabannan	Ardee
Braghan	36	Ferrard	Termonfeckin	Drogheda
Briarhill	81	Ferrard	Dysart	Drogheda
Brittas	338	Ferrard	Carrickbaggot	Drogheda
Broadlough	168	Ardee	Ardee	Ardee
Broughattin	68	Lower Dundalk	Ballymascanlan	Dundalk
Brownstown	613	Ferrard	Drumshallon	Drogheda
Burren	405	Ferrard	Dunleer	Ardee
Calga	257	Ardee	Philipstown	Ardee
Callystown	680	Ferrard	Clogher	Drogheda
Cambrickville	43	Upper Dundalk	Dundalk	Dundalk
Cangy	123	Ardee	Cappoge	Ardee
Canonstown	254	Ferrard	Termonfeckin	Drogheda
Cappocksgreen	194	Ardee	Ardee	Ardee
Cappoge	400	Ardee	Cappoge	Ardee
Cardistown	330	Ardee	Clonkeen	Ardee
**Carlingford**	Town	Dundalk Lower	Carlingford	Dundalk
Carlingford, Liberties of	2,321	Dundalk Lower	Carlingford	Dundalk
Carn Beg	135	Upper Dundalk	Dundalk	Dundalk
Carn More	72	Upper Dundalk	Dundalk	Dundalk
Carnalughoge	108	Louth	Louth	Dundalk
Carnanbregagh	107	Upper Dundalk	Ballybarrack	Dundalk
Carnroe	108	Upper Dundalk	Dunbin	Dundalk
Carntown	427	Drogheda	Ballymakenny	Drogheda
Carntown	86	Drogheda	St. Peter's	Drogheda
Carracloghan	166	Upper Dundalk	Inishkeen	Dundalk
Carrans and Tates Park	132	Upper Dundalk	Dunbin	Dundalk
Carrickacreagh	67	Louth	Louth	Dundalk
Carrickadooan	43	Louth	Louth	Dundalk
Carrickallan	181	Louth	Louth	Dundalk
Carrickalust	61	Upper Dundalk	Barronstown	Dundalk
Carrickastuck	229	Upper Dundalk	Philipstown	Dundalk
Carrickavallan	209	Ardee	Killanny	Dundalk
Carrickbaggot	487	Ferrard	Carrickbaggot	Drogheda
Carrickcarnan	350	Lower Dundalk	Ballymascanlan	Dundalk
Carrickedmond	574	Upper Dundalk	Faughart	Dundalk
Carrickleagh	91	Louth	Louth	Dundalk
Carrickmullan	229	Louth	Louth	Dundalk
Carricknashanagh	172	Ferrard	Drumshallon	Drogheda
Carrickrobin	246	Upper Dundalk	Barronstown	Dundalk
Carstown	326	Ferrard	Ballymakenny	Drogheda
Carstown	731	Ferrard	Termonfeckin	Drogheda
Cartanstown	288	Ferrard	Drumshallon	Drogheda
**Castlebellingham**	Town	Ardee	Gernonstown	Ardee
Castlebellingham	1,038	Ardee	Gernonstown	Ardee
Castlecarragh	366	Lower Dundalk	Carlingford	Dundalk
Castlelumny	347	Ferrard	Mullary	Drogheda
Castlering	209	Louth	Louth	Dundalk
Castletate	7	Ardee	Louth	Dundalk
Castletown	126	Ferrard	Mullary	Drogheda
Castletown	377	Upper Dundalk	Castletown	Dundalk
Castletowncooley	1,211	Lower Dundalk	Carlingford	Dundalk
Cavan	92	Upper Dundalk	Dunbin	Dundalk
Cavan	147	Upper Dundalk	Haynestown	Dundalk
Cavananore	219	Upper Dundalk	Creggan	Dundalk
Cavanrobert	77	Ardee	Tallanstown	Ardee
Chanonrock	645	Louth	Louth	Dundalk
Charlestown	514	Ardee	Charlestown	Ardee
Charleville	510	Ardee	Stabannan	Ardee
Christianstown	499	Louth	Darver	Dundalk
Churchtown	21	Ardee	Clonkeen	Ardee
Claretrock	299	Lower Dundalk	Ballymascanlan	Dundalk
Cliven	239	Ardee	Mosstown	Ardee
Cloghanmoyle	116	Ardee	Clonkeen	Ardee
**Clogher**	Town	Ferrard	Clogher	Drogheda
Clogher	301	Ferrard	Clogher	Drogheda
Cloghlea	94	Ferrard	Rathdrumin	Drogheda
Clonaleenaghan	311	Upper Dundalk	Creggan	Dundalk
Clonkeehan	133	Louth	Clonkeehan	Ardee
Clonmore	726	Ferrard	Clonmore	Drogheda
Cluide	173	Ferrard	Dunleer	Ardee
Cluide	25	Ardee	Smarmore	Ardee
**Collon**	Town	Ferrard	Collon	Ardee
Collon	4,348	Ferrard	Collon	Ardee
Commons	200	Drogheda	St. Peter's	Drogheda
Commons	674	Lower Dundalk	Carlingford	Dundalk
Commons	969	Louth	Dromiskin	Dundalk
Commons	7	Louth	Louth	Dundalk
Coneyburrow	72	Ardee	Cappoge	Ardee
Cookspark	143	Ardee	Mosstown	Ardee
Cookstown	313	Ardee	Charlestown	Ardee
Coolcreedan	352	Louth	Louth	Dundalk
Coole	482	Ardee	Charlestown	Ardee
Coolfore	556	Ferrard	Tullyallen	Drogheda
Coolrath	33	Louth	Louth	Dundalk
Corbollis	471	Louth	Clonkeehan	Ardee
Corcreeghagh	183	Ardee	Louth	Dundalk
Corderry	780	Louth	Louth	Dundalk
Cordoogan	240	Ferrard	Monasterboice	Drogheda
Corlisbane	170	Ferrard	Mullary	Ardee
Cornamucklagh	749	Lower Dundalk	Carlingford	Dundalk
Corradoran	109	Ardee	Killanny	Dundalk
Corrakit	813	Lower Dundalk	Carlingford	Dundalk
Corstown	284	Ardee	Drumcar	Ardee
Corstown	226	Ferrard	Dunany	Ardee
Corstown	64	Ferrard	Dunleer	Ardee
Cortial	437	Louth	Louth	Dundalk
Cotlerstown	138	Ferrard	Ballymakenny	Drogheda
Courtbane	421	Upper Dundalk	Creggan	Dundalk
Crossabeagh	147	Louth	Louth	Dundalk
Crowmartin	478	Ardee	Clonkeen	Ardee
Cruisetown	264	Ferrard	Parsonstown	Drogheda
Crumlin	174	Upper Dundalk	Dundalk	Dundalk
Cuillenstown	379	Louth	Darver	Dundalk
Culfore	84	Lower Dundalk	Ballymascanlan	Dundalk
Cunnicar	133	Upper Dundalk	Barronstown	Dundalk
Curraghbeg	232	Ardee	Ardee	Ardee
Curstown	215	Ferrard	Termonfeckin	Drogheda
Dales	239	Ferrard	Mayne	Drogheda
Dardisrath	208	Ferrard	Termonfeckin	Drogheda
Darver	296	Louth	Darver	Dundalk
Dawsonsdemesne	148	Ardee	Ardee	Ardee
Deerpark	79	Upper Dundalk	Philipstown	Dundalk
Dellin	112	Louth	Darver	Dundalk
Demesne	373	Upper Dundalk	Dundalk	Dundalk
Derrycammagh	540	Louth	Mansfieldstown	Ardee
Derryfalone	159	Upper Dundalk	Barronstown	Dundalk
Dillonstown	480	Ardee	Drumcar	Ardee
Donaghmore	540	Upper Dundalk	Dunbin	Dundalk
Donnellytown	77	Ferrard	Drumshallon	Drogheda
Doolargy	1,222	Lower Dundalk	Ballymascanlan	Dundalk
Dowdallshill	442	Upper Dundalk	Dundalk	Dundalk
Dowdstown	218	Ardee	Mapastown	Ardee
Draghanstown	319	Ferrard	Dunany	Ardee
Drakestown	364	Ardee	Kildemock	Ardee
Dromgoolestown	247	Ardee	Stabannan	Ardee
**Dromin**	Town	Ardee	Dromin	Ardee
Dromin	605	Ardee	Dromin	Ardee
**Dromiskin**	Town	Louth	Dromiskin	Dundalk
Dromiskin	1,093	Louth	Dromiskin	Dundalk
Drumad	308	Lower Dundalk	Ballymascanlan	Dundalk
Drumard	355	Ardee	Killanny	Dundalk
Drumbilla	532	Upper Dundalk	Roche	Dundalk
Drumcah	253	Louth	Louth	Dundalk
Drumcamill	86	Louth	Inishkeen	Dundalk
Drumcar	1,045	Ardee	Drumcar	Ardee
Drumcashel	1,060	Ardee	Stabannan	Ardee
Drumgonnelly	261	Louth	Louth	Dundalk
Drumgoolan	265	Louth	Louth	Dundalk
Drumgooter	88	Ferrard	Rathdrumin	Drogheda
Drumgowna	276	Louth	Louth	Dundalk
Drumgur	88	Ardee	Louth	Dundalk
Drumin	93	Ferrard	Dunleer	Ardee
Drumin	155	Ferrard	Dysart	Drogheda
Drumleck	17	Ardee	Gernonstown	Ardee
Drumleck	313	Louth	Dromiskin	Dundalk
Drummeenagh	56	Ardee	Gernonstown	Ardee
Drummullagh	453	Lower Dundalk	Carlingford	Dundalk
Drumnacarra	201	Lower Dundalk	Ballymascanlan	Dundalk
Drumnasillagh	173	Lower Dundalk	Ballymascanlan	Dundalk
Drumshallon	511	Ferrard	Drumshallon	Drogheda
Drumsinnot	96	Upper Dundalk	Inishkeen	Dundalk
Ducavan	99	Upper Dundalk	Roche	Dundalk
Duffsfarm	378	Ferrard	Termonfeckin	Drogheda
Dunany	619	Ferrard	Dunany	Ardee
Dunbin Big	423	Upper Dundalk	Dunbin	Dundalk
Dunbin Little	148	Upper Dundalk	Dunbin	Dundalk
**Dundalk**	Town	Upper Dundalk	Dundalk	Dundalk
Dungooly	609	Upper Dundalk	Faughart	Dundalk
**Dunleer**	Town	Ferrard	Dunleer	Ardee
Dunleer	99	Ferrard	Dunleer	Ardee
Dunmahon	421	Upper Dundalk	Haynestown	Dundalk
Durryhole	11	Ardee	Mosstown	Ardee
Dysart	200	Ferrard	Dysart	Drogheda
Earls Quarter	117	Lower Dundalk	Carlingford	Dundalk
Edenagrena	163	Upper Dundalk	Inishkeen	Dundalk
Edenakill	284	Upper Dundalk	Roche	Dundalk
Edenaquin	152	Ardee	Louth	Dundalk
Edentober	458	Lower Dundalk	Ballymascanlan	Dundalk
Edmondstown	486	Ardee	Philipstown	Ardee
Emlagh	66	Louth	Louth	Dundalk
Essexford	167	Ardee	Killanny	Dundalk
Fairhill	233	Upper Dundalk	Dundalk	Dundalk
Falmore	286	Upper Dundalk	Roche	Dundalk
Farrandreg	134	Upper Dundalk	Castletown	Dundalk
Faughart Lower	331	Lower Dundalk	Ballymascanlan	Dundalk
Faughart Upper	452	Lower Dundalk	Ballymascanlan	Dundalk
Feede	445	Lower Dundalk	Ballymascanlan	Dundalk
Feraghs	181	Louth	Louth	Dundalk
Fieldstown	279	Ferrard	Drumshallon	Drogheda
Finvoy	134	Ardee	Drumcar	Ardee
Funshog	906	Ferrard	Collon	Ardee
Gainestown Upper	110	Louth	Mansfieldstown	Ardee
Gallagh	262	Ferrard	Dysart	Drogheda
Gallstown	221	Ferrard	Marlestown	Drogheda
Galroostown	388	Ferrard	Termonfeckin	Drogheda
Galtrimsland	147	Lower Dundalk	Carlingford	Dundalk
Ganderstown	167	Ferrard	Termonfeckin	Drogheda
Garrolagh	61	Ferrard	Mayne	Drogheda
Garrolagh	188	Ferrard	Rathdrumin	Drogheda
Gibstown	212	Upper Dundalk	Louth	Dundalk
Gilbertstown	39	Ardee	Clonkeen	Ardee
Gilbertstown	237	Louth	Mansfieldstown	Ardee
Glack	332	Ardee	Clonkeen	Ardee
Glaspistol	501	Ferrard	Clogher	Drogheda
Glebe	135	Ardee	Ardee	Ardee
Glebe	17	Ferrard	Rathdrumin	Drogheda
Glebe	17	Ferrard	Tullyallen	Drogheda
Glebe	16	Upper Dundalk	Barronstown	Dundalk
Glebe	30	Upper Dundalk	Dundalk	Dundalk
Glebe Bog	2	Upper Dundalk	Barronstown	Dundalk
Glebe East	4	Ferrard	Mayne	Drogheda
Glebe SOuth	1	Ferrard	Mayne	Drogheda
Glebe West	4	Ferrard	Mayne	Drogheda
Glenmore	2,206	Lower Dundalk	Carlingford	Dundalk
Glydefarm	477	Louth	Louth	Ardee
Gorteen	263	Upper Dundalk	Inishkeen	Dundalk
Grange	766	Louth	Louth	Dundalk
Grange Irish	503	Lower Dundalk	Carlingford	Dundalk
Grange Old	83	Lower Dundalk	Carlingford	Dundalk
Grangebellew	144	Ferrard	Dysart	Drogheda
Grattanstown	135	Ferrard	Dysart	Drogheda
Greatwood	284	Ardee	Clonkeen	Ardee
Greenbatter	116	Drogheda	St. Peter's	Drogheda
Greenlane	150	Ardee	Charlestown	Ardee
**Greenmount**	Town	Ardee	Kilsaran	Ardee
Greenmount	533	Ardee	Kilsaran	Ardee
Greenore	257	Lower Dundalk	Carlingford	Dundalk
Groom	33	Ferrard	Mullary	Drogheda
Gudderstown	296	Ardee	Ardee	Ardee
Gunstown	155	Ardee	Mosstown	Ardee
Hacklin	183	Ardee	Kildemock	Ardee
Haggardstown	1,400	Upper Dundalk	Haggardstown	Dundalk
Halftate	61	Louth	Louth	Dundalk
Hamlinstown	232	Ferrard	Drumshallon	Drogheda
Hammondstown	81	Ardee	Cappoge	Ardee
Hammondstown	320	Ardee	Mosstown	Ardee
Harristown	70	Ardee	Charlestown	Ardee
Harristown	282	Ardee	Stickillin	Ardee
Hasley	80	Ardee	Ardee	Ardee
Haynestown	1,292	Upper Dundalk	Haynestown	Dundalk
Hill of Rath	230	Ferrard	Tullyallen	Drogheda
Hitchestown	117	Ferrard	Dysart	Drogheda
Hoarstone	138	Louth	Louth	Dundalk
Hoathstown	348	Ardee	Stickillin	Ardee
Hunterstown	166	Ardee	Kildemock	Ardee
Hurlstone	274	Ardee	Smarmore	Ardee
Irishtown	287	Ardee	Mapastown	Ardee
Jenkinstown	976	Lower Dundalk	Ballymascanlan	Dundalk
Johnstown	345	Ferrard	Dunany	Ardee
Kane	109	Upper Dundalk	Kane	Dundalk
Kearneystown	115	Ferrard	Mullary	Drogheda
Keerhan	114	Ferrard	Tullyallen	Drogheda
Keeverstown	223	Ferrard	Mullary	Drogheda
Kellystown	124	Ferrard	Drumshallon	Drogheda
Kilbride	22	Louth	Louth	Dundalk
Kilcroney	1,068	Louth	Louth	Dundalk
Kilcurly	437	Upper Dundalk	Dunbin	Dundalk
Kilcurry	177	Upper Dundalk	Ballymascanlan	Dundalk
Killaconner	107	Upper Dundalk	Inishkeen	Dundalk
Killally	307	Ferrard	Clonmore	Drogheda
Killally	116	Upper Dundalk	Ballybarrack	Dundalk
Killanny	88	Ardee	Killanny	Dundalk
Killatery	213	Ferrard	Mayne	Drogheda
Killeen	99	Louth	Louth	Dundalk
Killin	354	Upper Dundalk	Ballymascanlan	Dundalk
Killin	196	Upper Dundalk	Kane	Dundalk
Killincoole	619	Louth	Killincoole	Dundalk
Killineer	1,004	Drogheda	St. Peter's	Drogheda
Killyclessy	75	Upper Dundalk	Creggan	Dundalk
Killycroney	155	Louth	Louth	Dundalk
Kilpatrick	360	Ardee	Kildemock	Ardee
**Kilsaran**	Town	Ardee	Kilsaran	Ardee
Kilsaran	491	Ardee	Kilsaran	Ardee
Kiltallaght	221	Ferrard	Drumshallon	Drogheda
Kircock	76	Ferrard	Drumshallon	Drogheda
Knockaboys	72	Ardee	Clonkeen	Ardee
Knockagh	146	Upper Dundalk	Kane	Dundalk
Knockaleva	218	Ardee	Mosstown	Ardee
Knockatavy	109	Upper Dundalk	Louth	Dundalk
Knockatober	220	Ardee	Cappoge	Ardee
Knockattin	190	Upper Dundalk	Louth	Dundalk
Knockcor	65	Upper Dundalk	Dunbin	Dundalk
Knockcurlann	56	Ardee	Ardee	Ardee
Knockdinnin	224	Ardee	Dromin	Ardee
Knocklore	197	Ardee	Charlestown	Ardee
Knockmore	25	Louth	Louth	Dundalk
Knocknagoran	259	Lower Dundalk	Carlingford	Dundalk
Labanstown	372	Ferrard	Drumshallon	Drogheda
Lacknagreagh	83	Upper Dundalk	Barronstown	Dundalk
Lagan	157	Ardee	Clonkeen	Ardee
Lambtown	73	Ardee	Mapastown	Ardee
Lannat	512	Ardee	Killanny	Dundalk
Lawlesstown	47	Ardee	Cappoge	Ardee
Liberties of Carlingford	2,321	Lower Dundalk	Carlingford	Dundalk
Linns	188	Ardee	Gernonstown	Ardee
Liscorry	61	Drogheda	St. Peter's	Drogheda
Lisdoo	120	Upper Dundalk	Dundalk	Dundalk
Lislea	562	Lower Dundalk	Carlingford	Dundalk
Lismanus	136	Ardee	Mosstown	Ardee
Lisnawully	283	Upper Dundalk	Dundalk	Dundalk
Lisrenny	3	Ardee	Charlestown	Ardee
Lisrenny	848	Ardee	Tallanstown	Ardee
Listoke	124	Drogheda	St. Peter's	Drogheda
Listulk	78	Ardee	Mosstown	Ardee
Littlegrange	352	Ferrard	Tullyallen	Drogheda
Littlemill	103	Upper Dundalk	Ballybarrack	Dundalk
Longstones	1	Ferrard	Mullary	Drogheda
Loughanmore	147	Louth	Mansfieldstown	Ardee
Loughanmore	186	Lower Dundalk	Ballymascanlan	Dundalk
Loughantarve	119	Upper Dundalk	Louth	Dundalk
Loughtate	59	Ardee	Louth	Dundalk
**Louth**	Town	Louth	Louth	Dundalk
Louth Hall	1,027	Ardee	Tallanstown	Ardee
Louth Hill (or Mellifont Park)	129	Ferrard	Tullyallen	Drogheda
Lowrath North	326	Louth	Louth	Dundalk
Lowrath South	35	Louth	Louth	Dundalk
Lugbriscan	42	Lower Dundalk	Carlingford	Dundalk
Lurganboy	164	Ferrard	Port	Drogheda
**Lurgangreen**	Town	Louth	Dromiskin	Dundalk
Lurgankeel	611	Upper Dundalk	Faughart	Dundalk
Maddoxgarden	1	Lower Dundalk	Carlingford	Dundalk
Maddoxland	108	Lower Dundalk	Carlingford	Dundalk
Maghereagh	259	Upper Dundalk	Barronstown	Dundalk
Maine	671	Ardee	Kilsaran	Ardee
Manistown	86	Ardee	Ardee	Ardee
**Mansfieldstown**	Town	Louth	Mansfieldstown	Ardee
Mansfieldstown	551	Louth	Mansfieldstown	Ardee
Mapastown	224	Ardee	Mapastown	Ardee
Marlay	205	Ferrard	Marlestown	Drogheda
Marsh North	337	Upper Dundalk	Dundalk	Dundalk
Marsh South	790	Upper Dundalk	Dundalk	Dundalk
Marshallrath	171	Ardee	Mosstown	Ardee
Marshes Lower	590	Upper Dundalk	Dundalk	Dundalk
Marshes Upper	795	Upper Dundalk	Dundalk	Dundalk
Martinstown	265	Ferrard	Port	Drogheda
Mayne	217	Ferrard	Mayne	Drogheda
Meaghsland	42	Ferrard	Termonfeckin	Drogheda
Mell	1,141	Ferrard & Muni. Borough of Drogheda	Tullyallen	Drogheda
Mellifont	367	Ferrard	Tullyallen	Drogheda
Mellifont Park (or Louth Hill)	129	Ferrard	Tullyallen	Drogheda
Milestown	352	Ardee	Kilsaran	Ardee
Millgrange	339	Lower Dundalk	Carlingford	Dundalk
Millockstown	600	Ardee	Kildemock	Ardee
Millpark	117	Upper Dundalk	Louth	Dundalk
Milltown	127	Ferrard	Dysart	Drogheda
Milltown	287	Ferrard	Termonfeckin	Drogheda
Milltown	59	Upper Dundalk	Barronstown	Dundalk
Milltown	369	Louth	Dromiskin	Dundalk
Milltown Bog	13	Upper Dundalk	Barronstown	Dundalk
Milltown Grange	247	Louth	Dromiskin	Dundalk
Milltown Old	49	Louth	Dromiskin	Dundalk
Mitchelstown	150	Ferrard	Dunany	Ardee
Monascreebe	434	Lower Dundalk	Ballymascanlan	Dundalk
Monasterboice	276	Ferrard	Monasterboice	Drogheda
Monavallet	193	Louth	Louth	Dundalk
Moneycrockroe	378	Lower Dundalk	Ballymascanlan	Dundalk
Moneymore	710	Drogheda and Muni. Borough	St. Peter's	Drogheda
Monksland	302	Lower Dundalk	Carlingford	Dundalk
Mooremount	167	Ardee	Cappoge	Ardee
Mooremount	177	Ardee	Dromin	Ardee
Mooretown	965	Louth	Dromiskin	Dundalk
Moorland	161	Upper Dundalk	Dundalk	Dundalk
Morganstown	82	Ferrard	Dysart	Drogheda
Mosstown North	234	Ardee	Mosstown	Ardee
Mosstown South	52	Ardee	Mosstown	Ardee
Mountaintown	206	Ferrard	Dunleer	Ardee
Mountbagnall	347	Lower Dundalk	Carlingford	Dundalk
Mountdoyle	124	Ardee	Drumcar	Ardee
Mounthamilton	217	Upper Dundalk	Dundalk	Dundalk
Mountrush	181	Ardee	Clonkeen	Ardee
Muchgrange	316	Lower Dundalk	Carlingford	Dundalk
Mucklagh	99	Lower Dundalk	Carlingford	Dundalk
Muff	185	Ardee	Louth	Dundalk
Mullabane	171	Ardee	Clonkeen	Ardee
Mullabane	174	Lower Dundalk	Carlingford	Dundalk
Mullabohy	151	Louth	Louth	Dundalk
Mullacapple	154	Ardee	Mosstown	Ardee
Mullacloe	217	Ardee	Shanlis	Ardee
**Mullacrew**	Town	Louth	Louth	Dundalk
Mullacrew	106	Louth	Louth	Dundalk
Mullacurry	115	Ardee	Dromin	Ardee
Mulladrillen	55	Ardee	Ardee	Ardee
Mullagharlin	242	Upper Dundalk	Dundalk	Dundalk
Mullaghattin	282	Lower Dundalk	Ballymascanlan	Dundalk
Mullaghattin	175	Lower Dundalk	Carlingford	Dundalk
Mullameelan	88	Ardee	Ardee	Ardee
Mullamore	103	Ardee	Tallanstown	Ardee
Mullanstown	368	Ardee	Ardee	Ardee
Mullatee	160	Lower Dundalk	Carlingford	Dundalk
Mullavally	285	Louth	Louth	Dundalk
Mullincross	509	Ardee	Kilsaran	Ardee
Navan	140	Lower Dundalk	Ballymascanlan	Dundalk
Newhall	94	Ferrard	Dunleer	Ardee
Newhouse	225	Ferrard	Termonfeckin	Drogheda
Newragh	13	Louth	Louth	Dundalk
Newrath	494	Louth	Dromiskin	Dundalk
Newrath	77	Louth	Louth	Dundalk
Newtown	451	Ferrard	Termonfeckin	Drogheda
Newtown	330	Louth	Louth	Dundalk
Newtown	65	Ardee	Louth	Dundalk
Newtown Knockaleva	328	Ardee	Mosstown	Ardee
Newtown Monasterboice	868	Ferrard	Monasterboice	Drogheda
Newtownbabe	187	Upper Dundalk	Ballybarrack	Dundalk
Newtownbalregan	733	Upper Dundalk	Castletown	Dundalk
Newtowndarver	703	Louth	Darver	Dundalk
Newtownfane	131	Upper Dundalk	Louth	Dundalk
Newtownstalaban	112	Ferrard	Beaulieu	Drogheda
Newtownstalaban	953	Ferrard	Tullyallen	Drogheda
Nicholastown	501	Ardee	Philipstown	Ardee
Nicholastown	225	Ferrard	Port	Drogheda
Oaktate	126	Ardee	Louth	Dundalk
Oberstown	220	Ardee	Shanlis	Ardee
Paddock	93	Ferrard	Monasterboice	Drogheda
Painestown	284	Ardee	Dromin	Ardee
Painestown	208	Ferrard	Clonmore	Drogheda
Palmersland	93	Louth	Louth	Dundalk
Parsonstown	259	Ferrard	Parsonstown	Drogheda
Paughanstown	19	Ardee	Dromin	Ardee
Paughanstown	517	Ardee	Kildemock	Ardee
Pepperstown	544	Ardee	Charlestown	Ardee
Petestown	60	Lower Dundalk	Carlingford	Dundalk
Philibenstown	214	Ardee	Mapastown	Ardee
Philipstown	398	Ardee	Mosstown	Ardee
Philipstown	194	Ardee	Philipstown	Ardee
Philipstown	268	Ferrard	Philipstown	Drogheda
Philipstown	406	Upper Dundalk	Philipstown	Dundalk
Piedmont	428	Lower Dundalk	Ballymascanlan	Dundalk
Piperstown	355	Ferrard	Drumshallon	Drogheda
Plaster	312	Lower Dundalk	Ballymascanlan	Dundalk
Plaster	225	Upper Dundalk	Barronstown	Dundalk
Plunketsland	72	Ardee	Drumcar	Ardee
Plunketsland	29	Ardee	Louth	Dundalk
Point	153	Upper Dundalk	Dundalk	Dundalk
Pollbrock	106	Ardee	Stabannan	Ardee
**Port**	Town	Ferrard	Port	Drogheda
Port	703	Ferrard	Port	Drogheda
Priest Town	382	Ferrard	Mullary	Drogheda
Primatepark	43	Ferrard	Termonfeckin	Drogheda
Priorland	171	Upper Dundalk	Dundalk	Dundalk
Priorstate	118	Louth	Louth	Dundalk
Priorstown	259	Ferrard	Drumshallon	Drogheda
Priorstown	91	Ferrard	Termonfeckin	Drogheda
Proleek	439	Lower Dundalk	Ballymascanlan	Dundalk
Proleek Acres	59	Lower Dundalk	Ballymascanlan	Dundalk
Puckstown	139	Ardee	Mosstown	Ardee
Purcellstown	158	Ardee	Smarmore	Ardee
Rahanna	144	Ardee	Charlestown	Ardee
Rampark	412	Lower Dundalk	Ballymascanlan	Dundalk
Raskeagh	247	Upper Dundalk	Faughart	Dundalk
Rassan	640	Upper Dundalk	Creggan	Dundalk
Rath	75	Upper Dundalk	Ballybarrack	Dundalk
Rath	89	Lower Dundalk	Carlingford	Dundalk
Rath Lower	156	Lower Dundalk	Carlingford	Dundalk
Rath, Hill of	230	Ferrard	Tullyallen	Drogheda
Rathbody	284	Ardee	Tallanstown	Ardee
Rathbrist	569	Louth	Louth	Ardee
Rathcassan	187	Louth	Louth	Dundalk
Rathcoole	218	Ardee	Dromin	Ardee
**Rathcor**	Town	Lower Dundalk	Carlingford	Dundalk
Rathcor	654	Lower Dundalk	Carlingford	Dundalk
Rathdaniel	726	Ferrard	Mullary	Drogheda
Rathdrumin	146	Ferrard	Rathdrumin	Drogheda
Rathduff	180	Upper Dundalk	Roche	Dundalk
Rathescar Middle	319	Ardee	Mosstown	Ardee
Rathescar North	130	Ardee	Mosstown	Ardee
Rathescar South	26	Ardee	Mosstown	Ardee
Rathgeenan	147	Ardee	Clonkeen	Ardee
Rathgory	39	Ardee	Ardee	Ardee
Rathgory	269	Ferrard	Mullary	Drogheda
Rathiddy	182	Upper Dundalk	Louth	Dundalk
Rathlust	258	Ardee	Kildemock	Ardee
Rathmore	319	Upper Dundalk	Philipstown	Dundalk
Rathneestin	634	Ardee	Philipstown	Ardee
Rathneety	181	Louth	Killincoole	Dundalk
Rathneety	27	Louth	Louth	Dundalk
Rathory	227	Ardee	Tallanstown	Ardee
Rathroal	118	Upper Dundalk	Haynestown	Dundalk
Ravanny	84	Ardee	Louth	Dundalk
Ravel	305	Ferrard	Dunleer	Ardee
Ravensdale Park (or Anaverna)	2,343	Lower Dundalk	Ballymascanlan	Dundalk
Reaghstown	735	Ardee	Philipstown	Ardee
Redbog	220	Ardee	Louth	Dundalk
Redcow	164	Upper Dundalk	Dundalk	Dundalk
Reynoldstown	318	Ferrard	Mayne	Drogheda
Richard Taaffes Holding	318	Louth	Louth	Dundalk
Richardstown	80	Ardee	Dromin	Ardee
Richardstown	1,089	Ardee	Richardstown	Ardee
Rinkinstown	95	Ferrard	Rathdrumin	Drogheda
Riverstown	383	Ardee	Ardee	Ardee
Roche	35	Upper Dundalk	Kane	Dundalk
Roche	230	Upper Dundalk	Roche	Dundalk
Rock	67	Ardee	Ardee	Ardee
Rockmarshall	568	Lower Dundalk	Ballymascanlan	Dundalk
Roestown	421	Ardee	Kildemock	Ardee
Rogerstown	242	Ardee	Clonkeen	Ardee
Rokeby	245	Ferrard	Marlestown	Drogheda
Roodstown	685	Ardee	Stabannan	Ardee
Rootate	165	Ardee	Louth	Dundalk
Rosslough	355	Ardee	Louth	Dundalk
Rossmakay	397	Upper Dundalk	Louth	Dundalk
Roxborough	134	Ferrard	Mullary	Drogheda
Salterstown	1,047	Ferrard	Salterstown	Ardee
Sandfield	80	Ardee	Louth	Dundalk
Scogganstown	69	Ardee	Ardee	Ardee
Seecrin	33	Lower Dundalk	Carlingford	Dundalk
Shamrockhill	90	Ferrard	Dunleer	Ardee
Shanlis	904	Ardee	Shanlis	Ardee
Shanmullagh	229	Upper Dundalk	Creggan	Dundalk
Sheelagh	290	Upper Dundalk	Creggan	Dundalk
Sheepgrange	406	Ferrard	Tullyallen	Drogheda
Sheepwalk	42	Louth	Louth	Dundalk
Shortstone East	201	Upper Dundalk	Roche	Dundalk
Shortstone West	349	Upper Dundalk	Roche	Dundalk
Silloge	102	Ferrard	Monasterboice	Drogheda
Simonstown	170	Ardee	Drumcar	Ardee
Skeaghmore	83	Ardee	Drumcar	Ardee
Skibbolmore	82	Ferrard	Dunleer	Ardee
Slieve	140	Upper Dundalk	Kane	Dundalk
Slieveboy	89	Ferrard	Dunleer	Ardee
Smarmore	1,119	Ardee	Smarmore	Ardee
Spellickanee	299	Lower Dundalk	Ballymascanlan	Dundalk
Sportsmanshall	124	Upper Dundalk	Dundalk	Dundalk
**Stabannan**	Town	Ardee	Stabannan	Ardee
Stabannan	498	Ardee	Stabannan	Ardee
Stephenstown	201	Upper Dundalk	Louth	Dundalk
Stickillin	730	Ardee	Stickillin	Ardee
Stifyans	46	Ardee	Mosstown	Ardee
Stirue	46	Ardee	Mosstown	Ardee
Stirue	203	Ferrard	Mullary	Drogheda
Stonehouse	487	Ferrard	Mullary	Drogheda
Stonetown Lower	181	Ardee	Louth	Dundalk
Stonetown Upper	62	Ardee	Louth	Dundalk
Stonylane	180	Ardee	Ardee	Ardee
Stormanstown	536	Ardee	Clonkeen	Ardee
Stranacarry	72	Upper Dundalk	Castletown	Dundalk
Streamstown	154	Ardee	Mapastown	Ardee
Stumpa	122	Upper Dundalk	Kane	Dundalk
Summerhill	289	Louth	Louth	Dundalk
Swinestown	86	Ferrard	Marlestown	Drogheda
Tankardsrock	332	Upper Dundalk	Castletown	Dundalk
Tatebane	232	Upper Dundalk	Roche	Dundalk
Tateetra	106	Upper Dundalk	Castletown	Dundalk
Tates and Carrans Park	132	Upper Dundalk	Dunbin	Dundalk
Tatnadarra	52	Upper Dundalk	Roche	Dundalk
Tattyboys	105	Ardee	Clonkeen	Ardee
Tattynaskeagh (or Thornfield)	179	Upper Dundalk	Inishkeen	Dundalk
Tawnamore	180	Upper Dundalk	Creggan	Dundalk
Templetown	436	Lower Dundalk	Carlingford	Dundalk
**Termonfeckin**	Town	Ferrard	Termonfeckin	Drogheda
Termonfeckin	1,096	Ferrard	Termonfeckin	Drogheda
Thomastown	407	Ardee	Philipstown	Ardee
Thomastown	65	Ardee	Tallanstown	Ardee
Thomastown	136	Upper Dundalk	Dunbin	Dundalk
Thornfield (or Tattynaskeagh)	179	Upper Dundalk	Inishkeen	Dundalk
Timullen	161	Ferrard	Monasterboice	Drogheda
Tinure	347	Ferrard	Mullary	Drogheda
Toberdoney	222	Ardee	Dromin	Ardee
Togher	330	Ferrard	Clonmore	Drogheda
Toomes	344	Louth	Louth	Dundalk
Toprass	139	Upper Dundalk	Inishkeen	Dundalk
Townleyhall	924	Ferrard	Tullyallen	Drogheda
Townparks	1,123	Ardee	Ardee	Ardee
Townparks	435	Upper Dundalk	Dundalk	Dundalk
Townrath	426	Drogheda	St. Peter's	Drogheda
Treagh	253	Upper Dundalk	Creggan	Dundalk
Trean	158	Ferrard	Dunleer	Ardee
Tullagee	184	Louth	Louth	Dundalk
Tullaghomeath	749	Lower Dundalk	Carlingford	Dundalk
Tullakeel	716	Ardee	Clonkeen	Ardee
Tully	115	Ardee	Clonkeen	Ardee
Tully	765	Louth	Louth	Dundalk
**Tullyallen**	Town	Ferrard	Tullyallen	Drogheda
Tullyallen	941	Ferrard	Tullyallen	Drogheda
Tullyard	262	Ferrard	Termonfeckin	Drogheda
Tullycahan	266	Louth	Louth	Dundalk
Tullydonnell	684	Ardee	Drumcar	Ardee
Tullydrum	95	Ardee	Killanny	Dundalk
Tullyeskar	267	Ferrard	Ballymakenny	Drogheda
Tullygowan	140	Ardee	Killanny	Dundalk
Tullyraine	118	Ardee	Killanny	Dundalk
Twenties	156	Drogheda	St. Peter's	Drogheda
Verdonstown	181	Ardee	Drumcar	Ardee
**Wallace's Row**	Town	Drogheda	St. Peter's	Drogheda
Walshestown	217	Ferrard	Rathdrumin	Drogheda
Walterstown	317	Louth	Dromiskin	Dundalk
Whitecross	128	Louth	Louth	Dundalk
Whitemill	110	Lower Dundalk	Ballymascanlan	Dundalk
Whiterath	390	Louth	Dromiskin	Dundalk
Whiteriver	326	Ardee	Mosstown	Ardee
**Whites Town**	Town	Lower Dundalk	Carlingford	Dundalk
Whitestown	358	Lower Dundalk	Carlingford	Dundalk
Williamstown	534	Ardee	Kilsaran	Ardee
Willistown	312	Ardee	Drumcar	Ardee
Willville	540	Lower Dundalk	Carlingford	Dundalk
Windmill	68	Ferrard	Dunleer	Ardee
Windmill	167	Ferrard	Dysart	Drogheda
Woodhouse	37	Ardee	Mosstown	Ardee
Woodland	123	Ferrard	Dunleer	Ardee
Woodtown	325	Louth	Mansfieldstown	Ardee
Wottonstown	285	Louth	Mansfieldstown	Ardee
Wyanstown	241	Ferrard	Port	Drogheda
Yellowbatter	562	Drogheda and Muni. Borough	St. Peter's	Drogheda
