= Dundalk (disambiguation) =

Dundalk is the county town of County Louth, Ireland.

Dundalk may also refer to:

== Places ==
- Dundalk (barony), a former barony in County Louth, Ireland; see Ulaid
  - Dundalk Lower
  - Dundalk Upper
- Dundalk (Parliament of Ireland constituency)
- Dundalk (UK Parliament constituency)
- Dundalk, Maryland, United States of America
- Dundalk, Ontario, Canada
- Dundalk Bay, Ireland
- Dundalk railway station

== Sports clubs ==
- Dundalk Bulls, ice hockey
- Dundalk F.C., football
- Dundalk R.F.C, rugby union
