= Haggardstown =

Haggardstown Baile Hagaird
- Townland
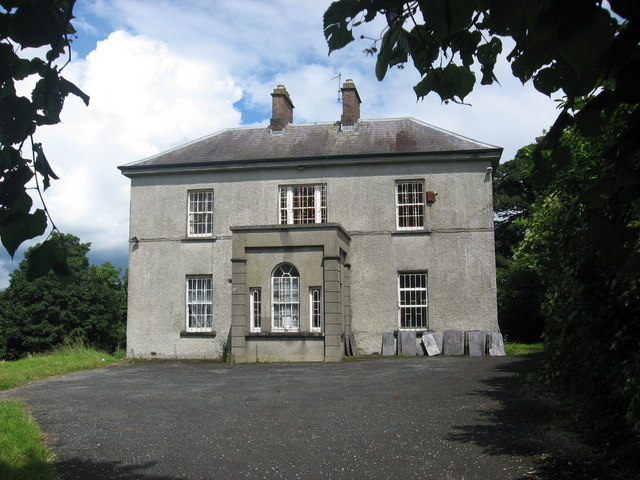
- Former presbytery in Haggardstown

- Location in Ireland
- Coordinates: 53°58′16″N 6°23′03″W
- Country: Ireland
- Province: Leinster
- County: County Louth
- Time zone: UTC+0 (WET)
  - Summer (DST): UTC-1 (IST (WEST))

Haggardstown (Irish: Baile Hagaird) is a townland and civil parish located in the barony of Upper Dundalk, on the southern outskirts of Dundalk, County Louth, Ireland. The civil parish of Haggardstown lies on the shore of Dundalk Bay, north of the estuary of the River Fane, and includes the village of Blackrock and Dundalk Golf Club.

== Education ==
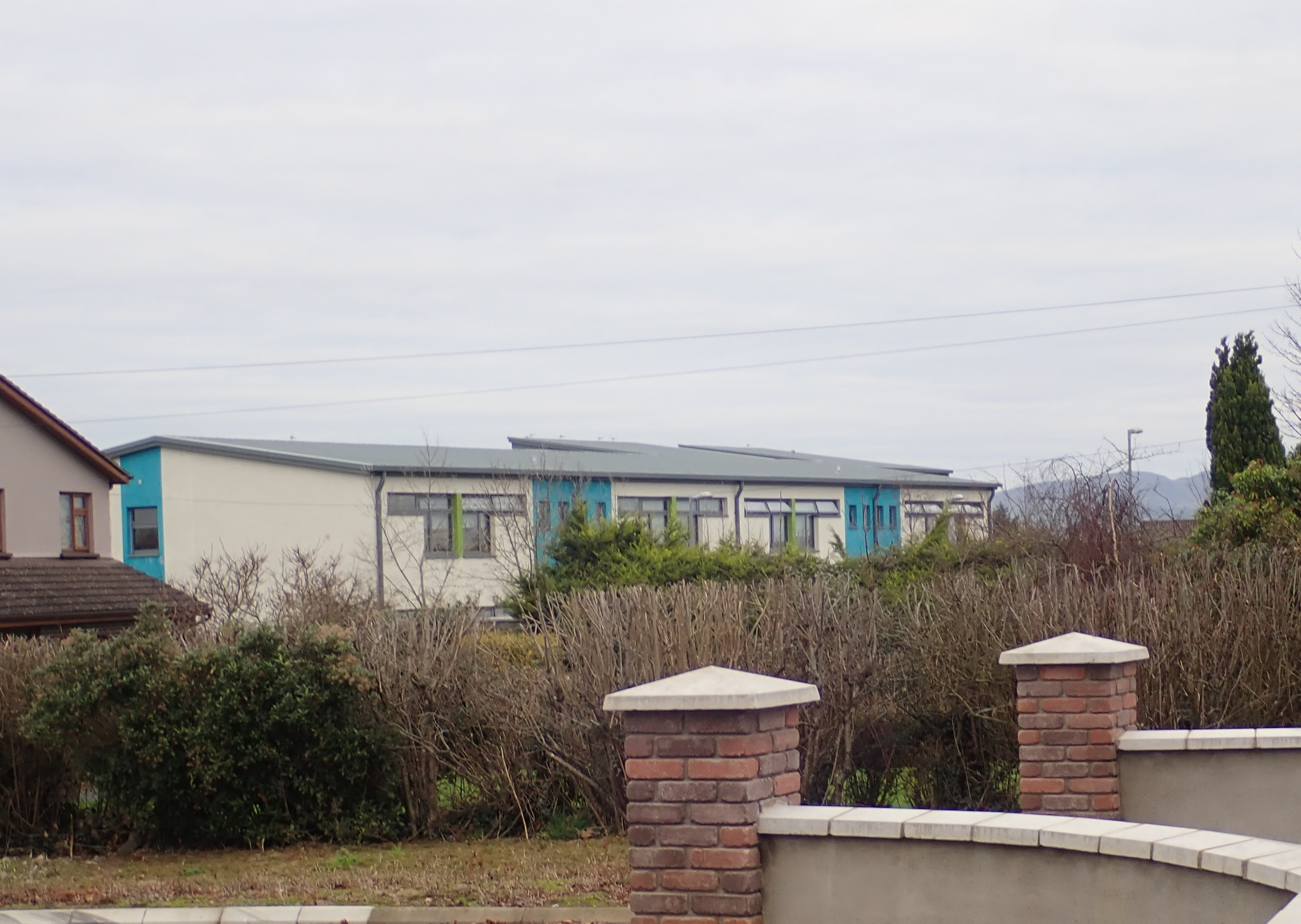
St Francis Primary School, Blackrock

There are three primary-level schools in the Haggardstown townland, one of them located in Haggardstown itself. There are no second-level education facilities in Haggardstown.

== Religion ==
Haggardstown has a large Roman Catholic church (dating from 1923), to which is attached a large adjoining cemetery. There is also a Church of Ireland church (dating from 1827) in Haynestown, a townland southwest of Haggardstown.

== Transport ==
Haggardstown is located along the R132, known locally as the Old Dublin Road, which traverses the western part of the townland. Haggardstown is approximately 5 km from Dundalk Clarke railway station. The M1 Motorway, which connects the Dundalk area with Newry and Dublin, is also close by. A number of bus services, with stops along the R132, run through Haggardstown.

== Sport ==
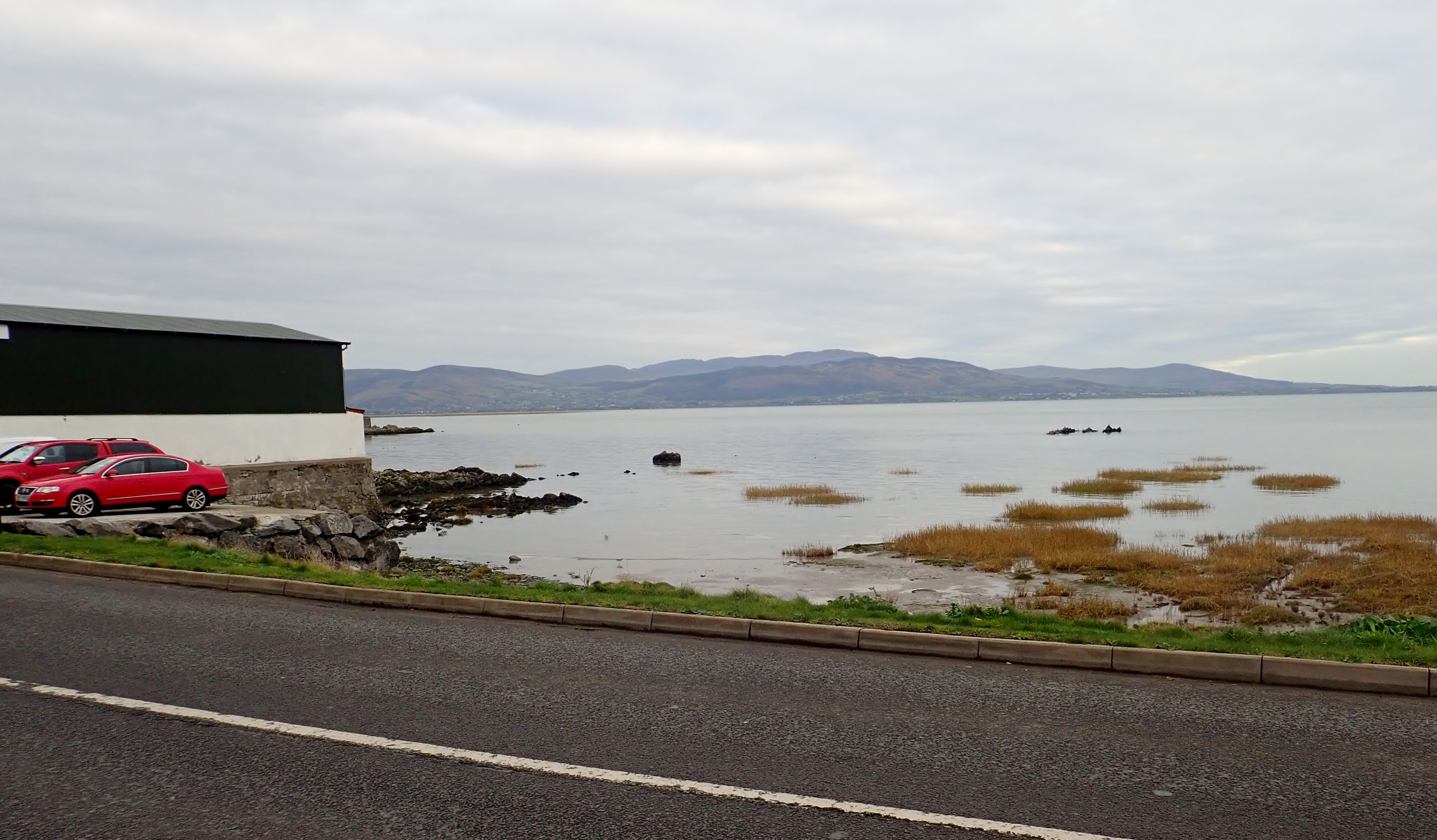
Dundalk Bay seen from the Haggardstown shore

Geraldines GFC is the local Gaelic football team. The club has won the Louth Senior Football Championship five times.

== Notable people ==
- Gerard Hoey, Louth senior county footballer
