= Charles Read =

Charles Read may refer to:

- Charles Read (Australian politician) (1814–1910), politician in Geelong, Victoria, Australia
- Charles A. Read (1837–1865), American Civil War sailor and Medal of Honor recipient
- Charles Read (Medal of Honor) (1840–?), American Civil War sailor and Medal of Honor recipient
- Charles Read (naval officer) (1840–1890), United States Navy and Confederate States Navy officer
- Charles Anderson Read (1841–1878), Irish writer
- Charles Hercules Read (1857–1929), British archaeologist and curator
- Charles Read (squash player) (1889–?), British professional squash player
- Charles Read (RAAF officer) (1918–2014), commander in the Royal Australian Air Force
- Charles Read (mathematician) (1958–2015), British mathematician
- Sir Charles D. Read (1902–1957), New Zealand surgeon
- Charles Read (Philadelphia) (died 1736), merchant and mayor of Philadelphia
- Charles Read (British historian), British economic historian
- Charles Read (French historian) (1819-1898), French historian of religion

== See also ==
- Charles Reade (disambiguation)
- Charles Reed (disambiguation)
- Charles Reid (disambiguation)
