= Charles Reed =

Charles or Chuck Reed may refer to:

== Law and politics ==
- Charles Manning Reed (1803–1871), U.S. representative from Pennsylvania
- Charles Reed (British politician) (1819–1881), British politician
- Charles N. Reed (1837–1926), American politician
- Charles A. Reed (New Jersey politician) (1857–1940), American politician
- Chuck Reed (born 1948), American politician

== Others ==
- Charles Reed (architect) (1814–1859), English architect
- Charles W. Reed (1842–1926), American soldier
- C. A. L. Reed (Charles Alfred L. Reed) (1856–1928), American medical doctor
- Charles Reed (footballer) (1882–1950), English footballer
- Chick Reed (Charles William Reed, 1912–1964), English footballer
- Charles B. Reed (1941–2016), American university administrator

== Other uses ==
- Charles A. Reed (fireboat), the City of Toronto's first official fireboat

== See also ==
- Charlie Reed (disambiguation)
- Charles Reid (disambiguation)
- Charles Read (disambiguation)
- Charles Reade (disambiguation)
