= Farney (barony) =

Farney Fearnaigh (Irish)
- Barony
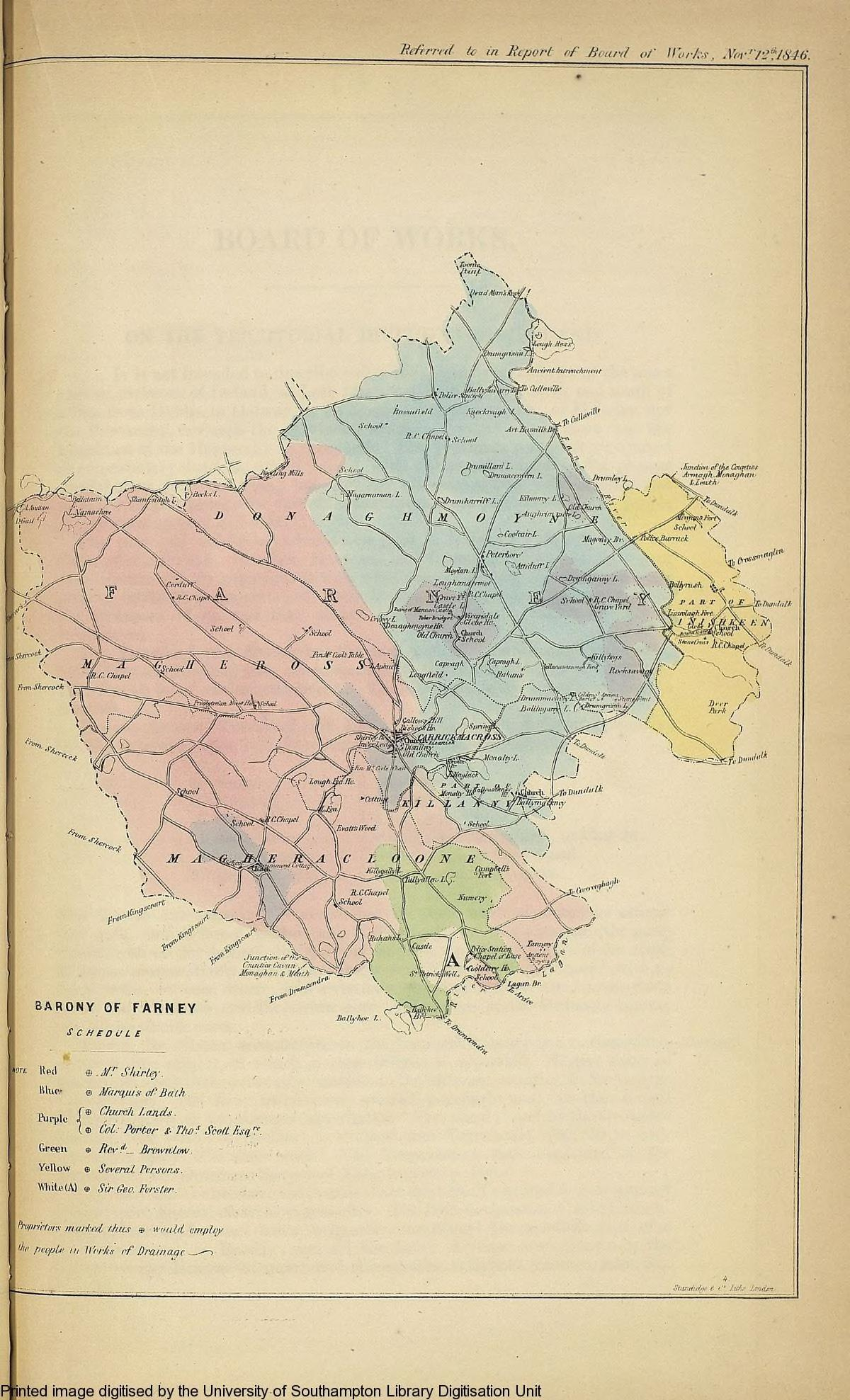
- Map of Farney in 1846, with land colour-coded by owner.
- Coordinates: 54°0′N 6°40′W
- Sovereign state: Ireland
- County: Monaghan

Area
  - Total: 272.48 km^{2} (105.21 sq mi)

Farney (Irish: Fearnaigh) is a barony in County Monaghan, Ireland.

== Etymology ==
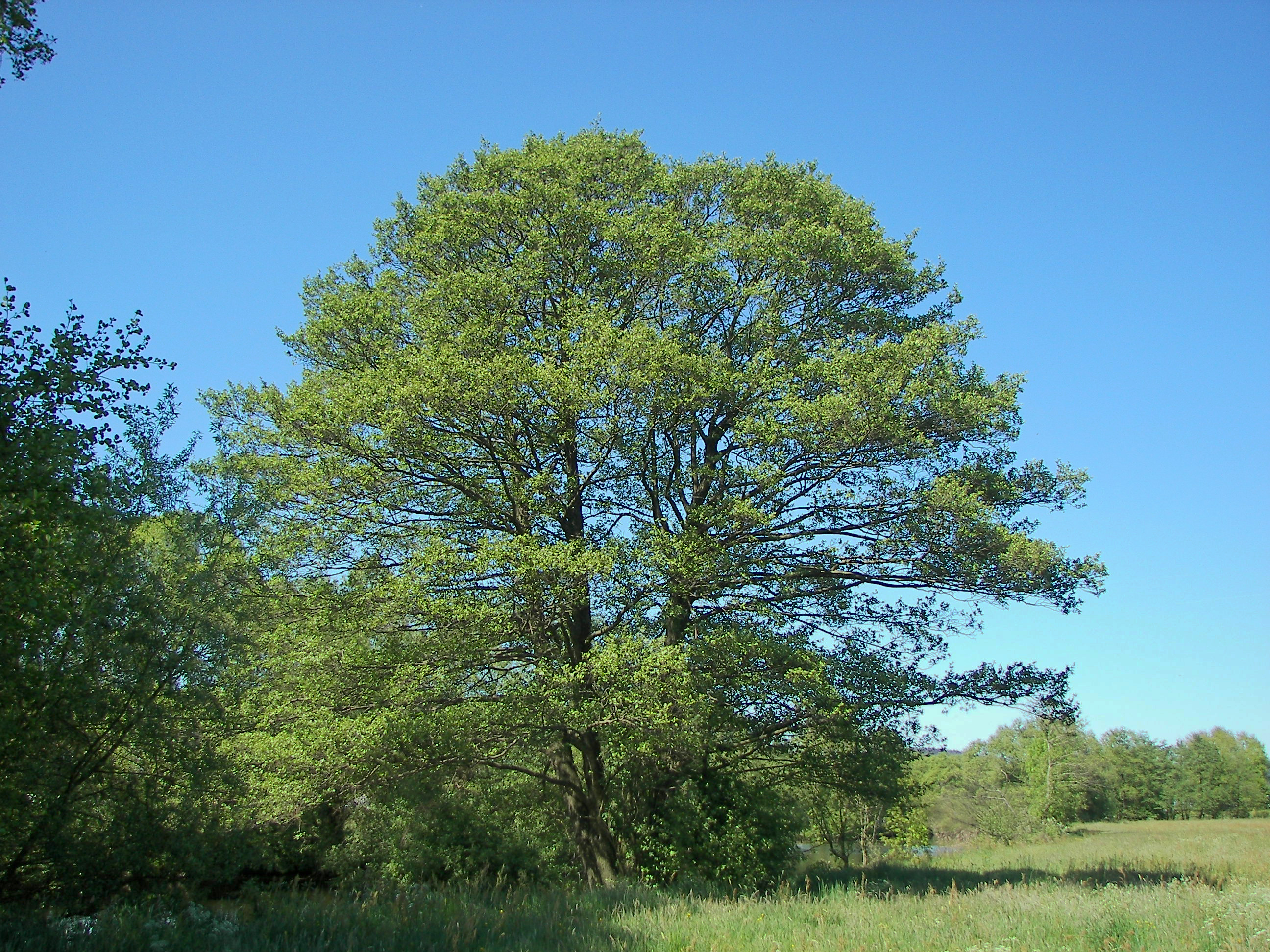
Farney is named for the alder tree (Old Irish: fern)

Farney takes its name from the ancient kingdom of Fernmag ("plain of alders").

== Location ==
Farney is found in southeast County Monaghan, north of the River Lagan, west of the River Fane and south of Lough Muckno.

Farney is bordered to the north by Cremorne, County Monaghan; to the east by Dundalk Upper, Louth and Ardee, County Louth; to the south by Lower Slane, County Meath; and to the west by Clankee, County Cavan.

== History ==
O'Ciaran or O'Kieran is given as a chief of Fearnmuigh as a clan of Tír Eoghain. The O'Larkin sept is cited as chiefs alongside the O'Neills and MacCanns in the old territory of Airgíalla (Oriel), where they were chiefs of Farney and West Uí Breasail (in County Armagh). O Cosgro (ve) (O Cosgraigh) was the name of the chiefs of Feara Ruis (Fir Rois) near Carrickmacross and Ardee. MacArdle, a branch of the MacMahons of Oriel are noted here, as well as septs of Callan, O'Finn, O'Larkin, Hughes/Hayes, and O'Donegan.

== List of settlements ==
Below is a list of settlements in Farney barony:

- Carrickmacross
- Inniskeen
- Killanny (parish)
