= Blackrock, County Louth =

Seaside village in County Louth, Ireland

Blackrock Na Creagacha Dubha
- Village
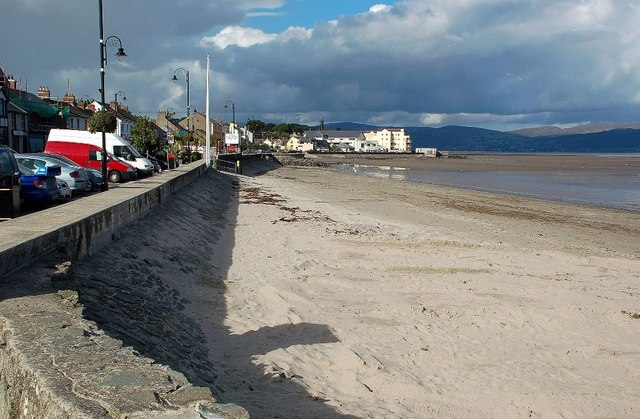
- Sea front and village

- Location in Ireland
- Coordinates: 53.96405°N 6.36514°W
- Country: Ireland
- Province: Leinster
- County: County Louth
- Dáil Éireann: Louth
- EU Parliament: Midlands–North-West

Population (2019) (Note: Blackrock is counted within the (settlement) census numbers alongside Dundalk, and within the (electoral division) census numbers alongside the rest of Haggardstown. No "official" or distinct census numbers are published for Blackrock.)
  - Estimate: 3,000
- Time zone: UTC±0 (WET)
  - Summer (DST): UTC+1 (IST)
- Eircode routing key: A91
- Telephone area code: +353(0)42
- Irish Grid Reference: J072028

Blackrock (Irish: Na Creagacha Dubha, meaning 'the black rocks') is a seaside village just to the south of Dundalk, County Louth, Ireland. The village is in the townland of Haggardstown, in the Barony of Upper Dundalk, and part of the Dundalk metropolitan area. The population of the village is approximately 3,000.

== History ==
In the 1950s and 1960s, Blackrock was a holiday destination for people in the landlocked counties of Monaghan and Cavan. The beach, which is pictured in colourised postcards of that era, was created with sand imported from beaches further down the coast, as sand is continually washed away contributing to the buildup of silt in Dundalk Bay. The village has subsequently seen a revival as a tourist resort.

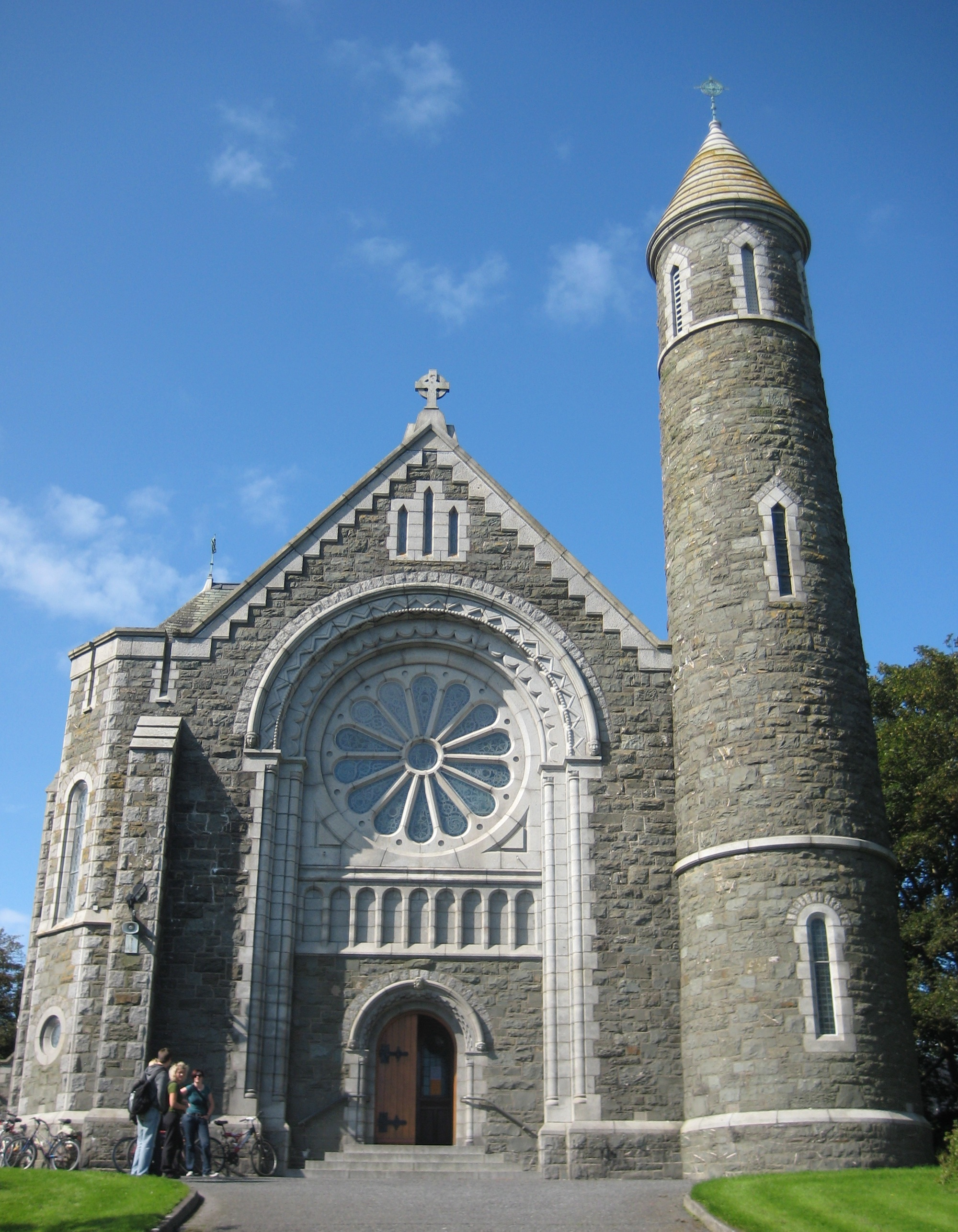
Church of St. Oliver Plunkett

Since the late 1960s, Blackrock has expanded significantly and has become a dormitory village of Dundalk, and is considered part of Dundalk for census purposes. With the opening of the M1 motorway to Dublin, there has been another wave of expansion and it is also becoming a commuter town with access to north Dublin.

Blackrock beach and its promenade (incorporating Blackrock's Millennium project - a sundial which is claimed to be the largest in a public area in Ireland) is still a focal point of the village and the site of Christmas Day fundraising events, an annual raft race, annual movie festival and pumpkin festival. The promenade area has a number of restaurants and public houses.

== Geography ==
In common with a number of east coast locations, the beach has a gentle gradient and the sea retreats about 5 km at low tide. The exposed seabed is a mixture of sand and mud flats. It is a habitat for a variety of wader birds, including brent geese and dunlins. The River Fane (to the south of Blackrock) enters the sea as a channel crossing from south to north in front of the promenade. Even at high tide, the water level is only about 1m out to the channel, and the front has become a sailboarding venue.

There are views looking north over Dundalk Bay from the promenade toward the Cooley Mountains.

== Sport ==
=== Greyhound racing ===
Blackrock Greyhound Stadium was a greyhound racing stadium in Sandy Lane and the racing was organised by the Blackrock Greyhound Racing Company Ltd. The first racing in Blackrock took place at 'The Field' which is now modern day Beech Park housing in 1929 but moved a very short distance to Sandy Lane during the 1930s. Olympian Pete McArdle trained at the greyhound track in the early 1950s. The site closed during the 1960s and the Blackrock Community Council took over Sandy Lane in 1971.

=== Association football ===
After the closure of the greyhound track Sandy Lane became a venue for the Juveniles and then Rock Celtic Football Club.

== Transport ==
The village is served by public transport links seven days per week. Halpenny Travel's route 169 provides services to Dundalk. Additionally, Bus Éireann routes 100 and 100X serving Dundalk, Drogheda, Dublin Airport and Dublin can be accessed on the Dublin Road in Haggardstown, approximately one mile from the village.

== Notable people ==
- Colonel Henry Baker (c. 1640–1689), Governor of Derry and Culmore, retired to Blackrock
- Paul Vincent Carroll (1899–1968), playwright, born Blackrock
- Len Deighton (born 1929), novelist, was married and lived in Blackrock

== See also ==
- List of towns and villages in Ireland
