= Charles Reade (disambiguation) =

Charles Reade was a dramatist.

Charles Reade may also refer to:

- Charles Reade (town planner)

== See also ==
- Charles Read (disambiguation)
- Charles Reid (disambiguation)
- Charles Reed (disambiguation)
