= Charles Anderson Read =

Irish journalist, novelist and anthologist

Charles Anderson Read (born 1841, Sligo, Ireland; d.1878, Surrey, England) was an Irish journalist, novelist and anthologist.

== Life ==
He was born to a landowning family near Sligo. He had a business in Rathfriland, County Down, but when it failed he moved to London, becoming a journalist.

He produced numerous sketches, poems, short tales, and nine novels. Two much-acclaimed novels were Savourneen Dheelish (1869) and Aileen Aroon (1870). The former dealt with the same episode as William Carleton's short story Wildgoose Lodge, i.e. the Wildgoose Lodge Murders of 1816. Before his death, in Surrey in 1878, he had completed three of four projected volumes of The Cabinet of Irish Literature. The final volume was edited by T. P. O'Connor.

== Select bibliography ==
- Love's Service
- Savourneen Dheelish (1869)
- Aileen Aroon (1870)
- The Cabinet of Irish Literature (3 volumes) (1876–1878)
