= Charlie Reed =

Charlie Reed may refer to:

- Chick Reed (1912–1964), English professional footballer
- Charlie Reed (journalist), American journalist

== See also ==
- Charlie Reid (disambiguation)
- Charles Reed (disambiguation)
