= Charles Reid =

Charles Reid may refer to:

- Charles Reid (Indian Army officer) (1819–1901), British army officer and GCB
- Charles Reid (rugby union) (1864–1909), Scottish rugby player
- Charles Reid (snowboarder) (born 1990), Canadian snowboarder
- Charles C. Reid (1868–1922), U.S. Representative from Arkansas
- Charles Carlow Reid (1879–1961), Scottish mining engineer and father of Sir William Reid
- Chip Reid (born 1955), American news reporter
- Tony Reid (Charles Anthony Reid, born 1962), Barbados-born American former cricketer
- Charles Reid (photographer) (1837–1929), Scottish photographer
- Charles S. Reid (1898–1947), chief justice of the Supreme Court of Georgia
- Charles Warwick Reid, involved in Attorney General for Hong Kong v Reid, Hong Kong legal case 1993
- Charles Reid (painter) (1937–2019), American painter, illustrator, and teacher
- Charles Reid Barnes (1858–1910), American botanist, and bryologist

== See also ==
- Charlie Reid (disambiguation)
- Charles Reed (disambiguation)
- Charles Read (disambiguation)
- Charles Reade (disambiguation)
