= Charlie Reid =

Charlie Reid may refer to:

- Charlie Reid of The Proclaimers
- Charlie Reid (ice hockey) (died 1953), ice hockey goaltender
- Charlie Reid (footballer), Irish international footballer

== See also ==
- Charlie Reed (disambiguation)
- Charles Reid (disambiguation)
