= Louth (barony) =

Louth Lú
- Barony
- Interactive map of Louth
- Sovereign state: Ireland
- County: Louth

Area
  - Total: 104.02 km^{2} (40.16 sq mi)

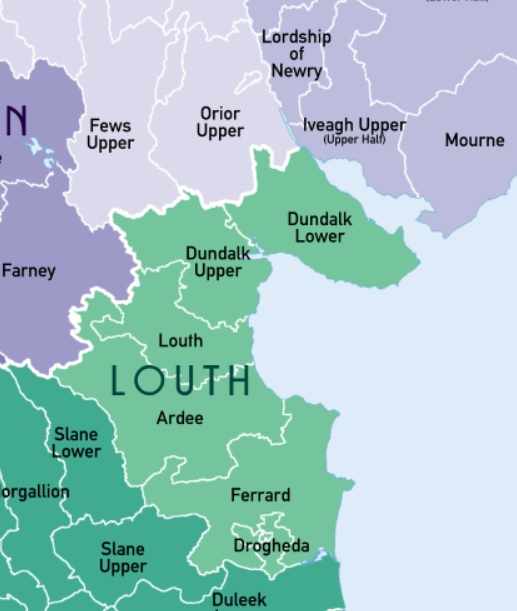
Baronies of Louth

Louth (Irish: Lú) is a barony in County Louth, Ireland.

== Etymology ==
Louth barony is named after the village of Louth (also Irish: Lú, for the god Lugh).

== Location ==
Louth barony is found in central County Louth, mostly between the River Glyde and River Fane. It is bordered to the north by Dundalk Upper; to the south by Ardee; and to the west by Farney, County Monaghan.

== History ==
Louth barony was formed from Ludha, or Lugha, the country of the Ó Cearbhaill Oirialla (O'Carroll of Oriel).

== List of settlements ==
Below is a list of settlements in Louth barony:

- Louth
- Tallanstown
