= Dundalk Upper =

Dundalk Upper Dún Dealgan Uachtarach (Irish)
- Barony
- Interactive map of Dundalk Upper
- Sovereign state: Ireland
- County: Louth

Area
  - Total: 125.7 km^{2} (48.5 sq mi)

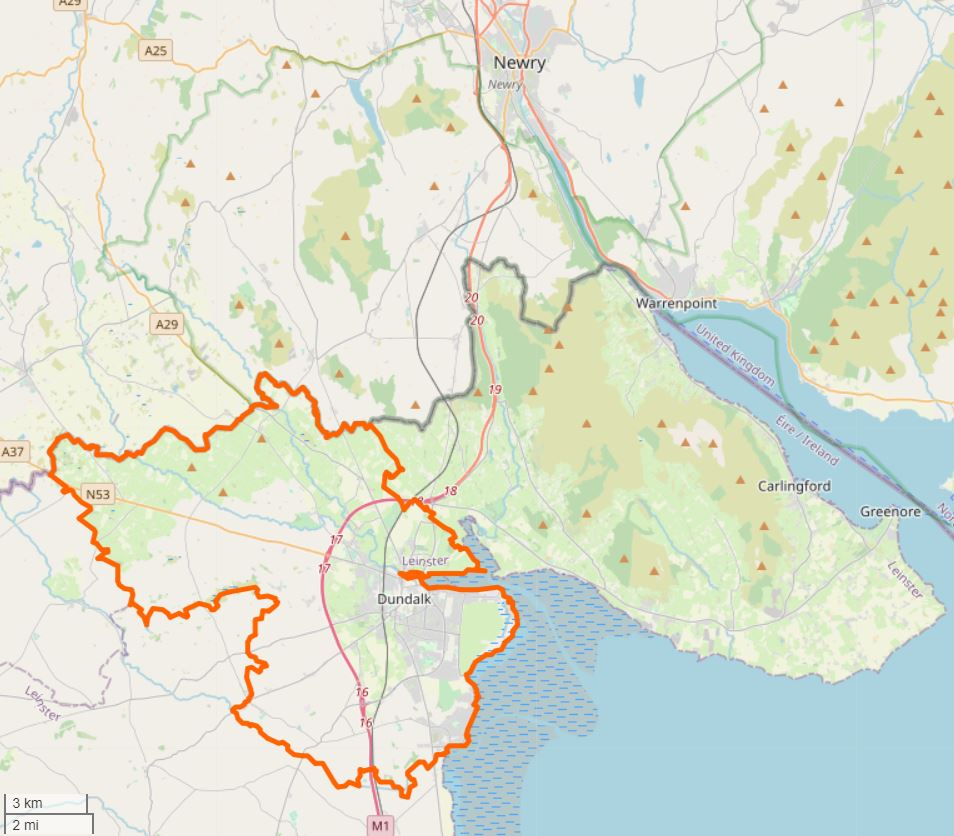
Barony of Upper Dundalk

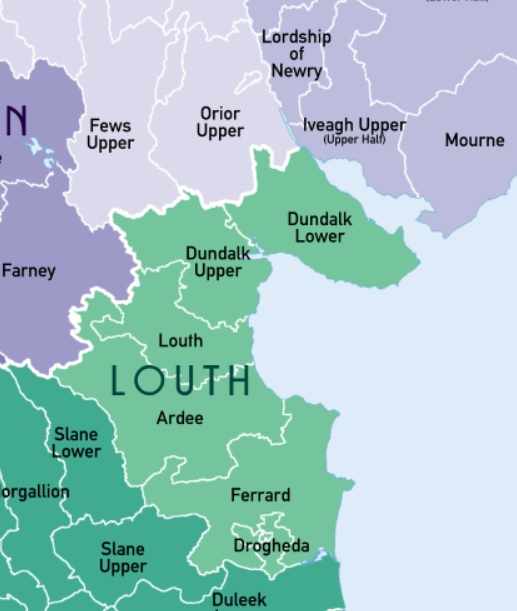
Baronies of Louth

Dundalk Upper (Irish: Dún Dealgan Uachtarach) is a barony in County Louth, Ireland.

== Etymology ==
Dundalk Upper is named after the town of Dundalk (Irish: Dún Dealgan, "Dalgan's dún").

== Location ==
Dundalk Upper is found in north County Louth, containing the valleys of the Castletown River and River Fane.

Dundalk Upper is bordered to the east by Dundalk Lower (Irish: Dún Dealgan Íochtarach), to the south by Louth (Irish: Lú), to the west by Farney (Irish: Fearnaigh), County Monaghan, and to the north by Orior Upper (Irish: Na hOirthir Uachtaracha) and Fews Upper (Irish: Na Feá Uachtaracha), County Armagh.

== History ==
Dundalk Upper was formed from Uí Mac Uais Breg, the country of the Mac Scanlans. The barony of Dundalk was the ancient home of the Conaille Muirtheimhne. The barony was split in half by 1821.

== Civil Parishes ==
There are 14 civil parishes.

- Ballybarrack (6 townlands)
- Barronstown (14 townlands)
- Castletown (8 townlands)
- Creggan (10 townlands)
- Dunbin (9 townlands)
- Dundalk (21 townlands)
- Faughart (4 townlands)
- Haggardstown (1 townlands)
- Haynestown (3 townlands)
- Inishkeen (35 townlands)
- Kane (5 townlands)
- Louth (87 townlands)
- Philipstown (4 townlands)
- Roche (11 townlands)

== Townlands ==
There are 118 townlands.

- Acarreagh (Irish: An tAcra Riabhach), Castletown Civil Parish, Barony of Upper Dundalk, County Louth
- Allardstown (Irish: Baile Alaird), Dunbin Civil Parish, Barony of Upper Dundalk, County Louth
- Annaghvacky (Irish: Eanach an Bhacaigh), Creggan Civil Parish, Barony of Upper Dundalk, County Louth
- Balbobin, Barronstown Civil Parish, Barony of Upper Dundalk, County Louth
- Ballinfuil (Irish: Baile an Phoill), Roche Civil Parish, Barony of Upper Dundalk, County Louth
- Ballinlough, Louth Civil Parish, Barony of Upper Dundalk, County Louth
- Ballinurd (Irish: Baile an Uird), Barronstown Civil Parish, Barony of Upper Dundalk, County Louth
- Ballybarrack (Irish: Baile Bhalraic), Ballybarrack Civil Parish, Barony of Upper Dundalk, County Louth
- Ballybinaby (Irish: Baile Binibe), Roche Civil Parish, Barony of Upper Dundalk, County Louth
- Balregan (Irish: Baile Uí Réigín), Castletown Civil Parish, Barony of Upper Dundalk, County Louth
- Balriggan (Irish: Baile Uiginn), Barony of Upper Dundalk, County Louth
- Barronstown (Irish: Baile Bharúin), Barronstown Civil Parish, Barony of Upper Dundalk, County Louth
- Cambrickville (Irish: Baile na Cáimrice), Dundalk Civil Parish, Barony of Upper Dundalk, County Louth
- Carnanbregagh (Irish: An Carnán Bréagach), Ballybarrack Civil Parish, Barony of Upper Dundalk, County Louth
- Carn Beg (Irish: An Carn Beag), Dundalk Civil Parish, Barony of Upper Dundalk, County Louth
- Carn More (Irish: An Carn Mór), Dundalk Civil Parish, Barony of Upper Dundalk, County Louth
- Carnroe (Irish: An Carnán Rua), Dunbin Civil Parish, Barony of Upper Dundalk, County Louth
- Carracloghan, Inishkeen Civil Parish, Barony of Upper Dundalk, County Louth
- Carrans Park (Tates and Carrans Park), Dunbin Civil Parish, Barony of Upper Dundalk, County Louth)
- Carrickalust (Irish: An Charraig Loiscthe), Barronstown Civil Parish, Barony of Upper Dundalk, County Louth
- Carrickastuck (Irish: Carraig an Stoca), Philipstown Civil Parish, Barony of Upper Dundalk, County Louth
- Carrickedmond (Irish: Carraig Éamainn), Faughart Civil Parish, Barony of Upper Dundalk, County Louth
- Carrickrobin (Irish: Carraig Roibín), Barronstown Civil Parish, Barony of Upper Dundalk, County Louth
- Castletown (Irish: Caisleán Dhún Dealgan), Castletown Civil Parish, Barony of Upper Dundalk, County Louth
- Cavan, Barony of Upper Dundalk, County Louth
- Cavananore (Irish: Cabhán an Óir), Creggan Civil Parish, Barony of Upper Dundalk, County Louth
- Clonaleenaghan (Irish: Cluain an Líonáin), Creggan Civil Parish, Barony of Upper Dundalk, County Louth
- Courtbane (Irish: An Chúirt Bhán), Creggan Civil Parish, Barony of Upper Dundalk, County Louth
- Crumlin (Irish: Cromghlinn), Dundalk Civil Parish, Barony of Upper Dundalk, County Louth
- Cunnicar (Irish: An Coinicéar), Barronstown Civil Parish, Barony of Upper Dundalk, County Louth
- Deerpark (Irish: Páirc na bhFia), Philipstown Civil Parish, Barony of Upper Dundalk, County Louth
- Demesne (Irish: An Diméin), Dundalk Civil Parish, Barony of Upper Dundalk, County Louth
- Derryfalone (Irish: Doire Mhaoileoin), Barronstown Civil Parish, Barony of Upper Dundalk, County Louth
- Donaghmore (Irish: An Domhnach Mór), Dunbin Civil Parish, Barony of Upper Dundalk, County Louth
- Dowdallshill (Irish: Mullach an Dúdálaigh), Dundalk Civil Parish, Barony of Upper Dundalk, County Louth
- Drumbilla (Irish: Droim Bile), Roche Civil Parish, Barony of Upper Dundalk, County Louth
- Drumsinnot, Inishkeen Civil Parish, Barony of Upper Dundalk, County Louth
- Ducavan (Irish: Dúchabhán), Roche Civil Parish, Barony of Upper Dundalk, County Louth
- Dunbin, Dunbin Civil Parish, Barony of Upper Dundalk, County Louth
- Dunbin Little (Irish: Dún Binne Beag), Dunbin Civil Parish, Barony of Upper Dundalk, County Louth
- Dungooly (Irish: Dún gCuaille), Faughart Civil Parish, Barony of Upper Dundalk, County Louth
- Dunmahon (Irish: Dún Machan), Haynestown Civil Parish, Barony of Upper Dundalk, County Louth
- East Shortstone (Irish: An Chloch Ghearr Uachtarach), Roche Civil Parish, Barony of Upper Dundalk, County Louth)
- Edenagrena, Inishkeen Civil Parish, Barony of Upper Dundalk, County Louth
- Edenakill (Irish: Éadan Ceall), Roche Civil Parish, Barony of Upper Dundalk, County Louth
- Fairhill (Irish: An Clochán Caol), Dundalk Civil Parish, Barony of Upper Dundalk, County Louth
- Falmore (Irish: Falmair), Roche Civil Parish, Barony of Upper Dundalk, County Louth
- Farrandreg (Irish: Fearann Dreig), Castletown Civil Parish, Barony of Upper Dundalk, County Louth
- Gibstown, Louth Civil Parish, Barony of Upper Dundalk, County Louth
- Glebe (Irish: An Ghléib), Barronstown Civil Parish, Barony of Upper Dundalk, County Louth
- Glebe Bog (Irish: Currach na Gléibe), Barronstown Civil Parish, Barony of Upper Dundalk, County Louth
- Glebe (E.D. Dundalk Rural) (Irish: An Ghléib), Dundalk Civil Parish, Barony of Upper Dundalk, County Louth
- Gorteen, Inishkeen Civil Parish, Barony of Upper Dundalk, County Louth
- Haggardstown (Irish: Baile Hagaird), Haggardstown Civil Parish, Barony of Upper Dundalk, County Louth
- Haynestown (Irish: Baile Héine), Haynestown Civil Parish, Barony of Upper Dundalk, County Louth
- Kane (Irish: Céin), Kane Civil Parish, Barony of Upper Dundalk, County Louth
- Kilcurly (Irish: Cill Choirle), Dunbin Civil Parish, Barony of Upper Dundalk, County Louth
- Kilcurry (Irish: Cill an Churraigh), Barony of Upper Dundalk, County Louth
- Killaconner, Inishkeen Civil Parish, Barony of Upper Dundalk, County Louth
- Killally (Irish: Cill Alaidh), Ballybarrack Civil Parish, Barony of Upper Dundalk, County Louth
- Killin (Irish: An Cillín), Kane Civil Parish, Barony of Upper Dundalk, County Louth
- Killyclessy (Irish: Coill an Chleasaí), Creggan Civil Parish, Barony of Upper Dundalk, County Louth
- Knockagh (Irish: Cnoc Each), Kane Civil Parish, Barony of Upper Dundalk, County Louth
- Knockatavy, Louth Civil Parish, Barony of Upper Dundalk, County Louth
- Knockattin, Louth Civil Parish, Barony of Upper Dundalk, County Louth
- Knockcor (Irish: An Cnoc Corr), Dunbin Civil Parish, Barony of Upper Dundalk, County Louth
- Lacknareagh, Barronstown Civil Parish, Barony of Upper Dundalk, County Louth
- Lisdoo (Irish: An Lios Dubh), Dundalk Civil Parish, Barony of Upper Dundalk, County Louth
- Lisnawully (Irish: Lios an Mhullaigh), Dundalk Civil Parish, Barony of Upper Dundalk, County Louth
- Littlemill (Irish: An Muileann Beag), Ballybarrack Civil Parish, Barony of Upper Dundalk, County Louth
- Loughantarve, Louth Civil Parish, Barony of Upper Dundalk, County Louth
- Lower Marshes (Irish: Na Méirsí Íochtaracha), Dundalk Civil Parish, Barony of Upper Dundalk, County Louth)
- Lurgankeel (Irish: An Lorgain Chaol), Faughart Civil Parish, Barony of Upper Dundalk, County Louth
- Maghereagh (Irish: An Machaire Riabhach), Barronstown Civil Parish, Barony of Upper Dundalk, County Louth
- Marshes Lower (Irish: Na Méirsí Íochtaracha), Dundalk Civil Parish, Barony of Upper Dundalk, County Louth
- Marshes Upper (Irish: Na Méirsí Uachtaracha), Dundalk Civil Parish, Barony of Upper Dundalk, County Louth
- Marsh North (Irish: An Méirse Thuaidh), Dundalk Civil Parish, Barony of Upper Dundalk, County Louth
- Marsh South (Irish: An Méirse Theas), Dundalk Civil Parish, Barony of Upper Dundalk, County Louth
- Millpark, Louth Civil Parish, Barony of Upper Dundalk, County Louth
- Milltown (Irish: Cnoc an Mhuilinn), Barronstown Civil Parish, Barony of Upper Dundalk, County Louth
- Milltown Bog (Irish: Currach Chnoc an Mhuilinn), Barronstown Civil Parish, Barony of Upper Dundalk, County Louth
- Moorland (Irish: An Currach), Dundalk Civil Parish, Barony of Upper Dundalk, County Louth
- Mounthamilton (Irish: Móta an Hamaltúnaigh), Dundalk Civil Parish, Barony of Upper Dundalk, County Louth
- Mullagharlin (Irish: Mullaigh Chairlinn), Dundalk Civil Parish, Barony of Upper Dundalk, County Louth
- Newtownbabe (Irish: Baile Nua an Bhábaigh), Ballybarrack Civil Parish, Barony of Upper Dundalk, County Louth
- Newtownbalregan (Irish: Baile Nua Dealgan), Castletown Civil Parish, Barony of Upper Dundalk, County Louth
- Newtownfane, Louth Civil Parish, Barony of Upper Dundalk, County Louth
- North Marsh (Irish: An Méirse Thuaidh), Dundalk Civil Parish, Barony of Upper Dundalk, County Louth)
- Philipstown (Irish: Baile Philib), Philipstown Civil Parish, Barony of Upper Dundalk, County Louth
- Plaster (Irish: Plástar), Barronstown Civil Parish, Barony of Upper Dundalk, County Louth
- Point (Irish: An Pointe), Dundalk Civil Parish, Barony of Upper Dundalk, County Louth
- Priorland (Irish: Baile an Phrióra), Dundalk Civil Parish, Barony of Upper Dundalk, County Louth
- Rallinclare, Louth Civil Parish, Barony of Upper Dundalk, County Louth
- Raskeagh (Irish: Ráth Sciach), Faughart Civil Parish, Barony of Upper Dundalk, County Louth
- Rassan (Irish: Rosán), Creggan Civil Parish, Barony of Upper Dundalk, County Louth
- Rath (Irish: An Ráth), Ballybarrack Civil Parish, Barony of Upper Dundalk, County Louth
- Rathduff (Irish: An Ráth Dubh), Roche Civil Parish, Barony of Upper Dundalk, County Louth
- Rathiddy, Louth Civil Parish, Barony of Upper Dundalk, County Louth
- Rathmore (Irish: An Ráth Mór), Philipstown Civil Parish, Barony of Upper Dundalk, County Louth
- Rathroal (Irish: Ráth Róil), Haynestown Civil Parish, Barony of Upper Dundalk, County Louth
- Roche (Irish: Dún Gall), Barony of Upper Dundalk, County Louth
- Rossmackay, Louth Civil Parish, Barony of Upper Dundalk, County Louth
- Shanmullagh (Irish: An Seanmhullach), Creggan Civil Parish, Barony of Upper Dundalk, County Louth
- Sheelagh (Irish: Saileogach), Creggan Civil Parish, Barony of Upper Dundalk, County Louth
- Shortstone East (Irish: An Chloch Ghearr Uachtarach), Roche Civil Parish, Barony of Upper Dundalk, County Louth
- Shortstone West (Irish: An Chloch Ghearr Íochtarach), Roche Civil Parish, Barony of Upper Dundalk, County Louth
- Slieve (Irish: An Mhuinchille), Kane Civil Parish, Barony of Upper Dundalk, County Louth
- South Marsh (Irish: An Méirse Theas), Dundalk Civil Parish, Barony of Upper Dundalk, County Louth)
- Sportsman's Hall (Irish: Halla na Croiche), Dundalk Civil Parish, Barony of Upper Dundalk, County Louth
- Stephenstown, Louth Civil Parish, Barony of Upper Dundalk, County Louth
- Stranacarry (Irish: Srath na Coradh), Castletown Civil Parish, Barony of Upper Dundalk, County Louth
- Stumpa (Irish: An Stumpa), Kane Civil Parish, Barony of Upper Dundalk, County Louth
- Tankardsrock (Irish: Carraig an Tancardaigh), Castletown Civil Parish, Barony of Upper Dundalk, County Louth
- Tatebane (Irish: An Táite Bán), Roche Civil Parish, Barony of Upper Dundalk, County Louth
- Tateetra (Irish: An Táite Íochtarach), Castletown Civil Parish, Barony of Upper Dundalk, County Louth
- Tates and Carrans Park, Dunbin Civil Parish, Barony of Upper Dundalk, County Louth
- Tatnadarra (Irish: Táite na Darach), Roche Civil Parish, Barony of Upper Dundalk, County Louth
- Tattynaskeagh, Inishkeen Civil Parish, Barony of Upper Dundalk, County Louth
- Tawnamore (Irish: An Tamhnach Mhór), Creggan Civil Parish, Barony of Upper Dundalk, County Louth
- Thomastown (Irish: Baile Thomáis), Dunbin Civil Parish, Barony of Upper Dundalk, County Louth
- Thornfield, Inishkeen Civil Parish, Barony of Upper Dundalk, County Louth
- Toprass, Inishkeen Civil Parish, Barony of Upper Dundalk, County Louth
- Townparks (Irish: Páirceanna an Bhaile), Dundalk Civil Parish, Barony of Upper Dundalk, County Louth
- Treagh (Irish: Tré), Creggan Civil Parish, Barony of Upper Dundalk, County Louth
- Upper Marshes (Irish: Na Méirsí Uachtaracha), Dundalk Civil Parish, Barony of Upper Dundalk, County Louth
- West Shortstone (Irish: An Chloch Ghearr Íochtarach), Roche Civil Parish, Barony of Upper Dundalk, County Louth
