= Killanny =

Killanny Cill Eanaigh
- Parish
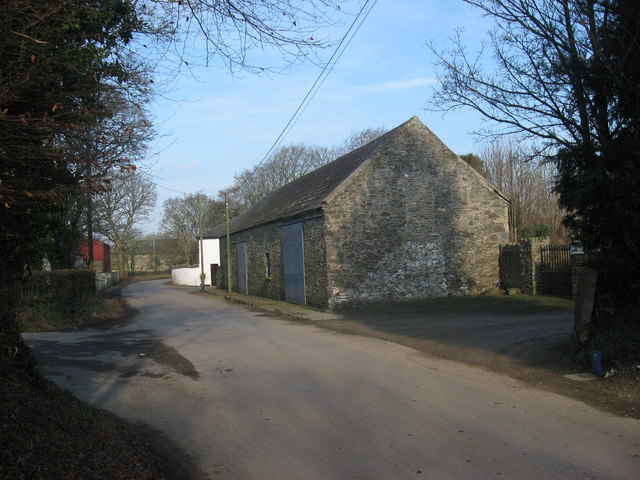
- Former barn church St. Ultan's in Killanny

- Location in Ireland
- Coordinates: 53°58′15″N 6°39′38″W
- Country: Ireland
- Provinces: Ulster and Leinster
- Counties: County Monaghan and County Louth
- Baronies: Farney and Ardee
- Time zone: UTC+0 (WET)
  - Summer (DST): UTC-1 (IST (WEST))
- Irish Grid Reference: H929024

Killanny (Irish: Cill Eanaigh) is a civil parish in Counties Louth and Monaghan in the mid-east of Ireland. Killanny is also a Catholic parish in the Diocese of Clogher. It is named after Saint Enda of Aran, known by the diminutive Éanna. The civil parish consists of 31 townlands in County Monaghan and 11 in County Louth. The townland of Killany, which can also be spelled Killanny or Killaney, lies within County Louth and contains the old St. Ultan's parish church and graveyard. The main Dublin–Derry road passes through Killanny. Several small lakes are to be found throughout the parish and the soil quality is superior to that of the north of Carrickmacross, reflecting the underlying limestone rock.

== History ==
Killanny lays claim to an association with Saint Patrick through an old Christian burial site at Annagh Golish Hill in Annaheam. Saint Ultan, a patron of children who died in the 7th century, is the patron saint. Unusually, Killanny is located across two counties and it is thought possible that Killanny originally consisted of two parishes separated by the River Glyde and that, following the Anglo-Norman settlement, the two parts were eventually joined. It is also suggested that the parish boundaries are an older entity than the county boundaries and correspond to an older socio-political entity. St. Ultan's holy well was located in Killanny townland in the 19th century. At this old church and cemetery, the walls of a friary and three private chapels can be found. The church in Killanny was used by the Church of Ireland until 1727 when a new church was built in Aghafad. The Catholics returned to use the church in Killanny in penal times. The present Catholic church of St. Enda, built in Hiberno-Romanesque style in 1927, is on a new site in Tullydrum, County Louth. It replaces earlier churches in Corcreeghagh, Rocktate and Killanny itself.

== Sport ==
The parish has a Gaelic football team called Killanny Geraldines. They have a senior team and underage teams. The club's U-16 team won the Division 3 Championship title and U-13 lost in the Division 2 Final in 2007. They won six underage cups in 2008.

== Education ==
In the 1820s, there were six schools in the parish - in Ballymackney, Shanrah, Ballyregan, Corcreegagh, Essexford and Leeg. As of the 21st century, one national (primary) school, the new Scoil Naoimh Éanna, serves the whole parish. There is no secondary school so the children go to school in Carrickmacross.

== Demographics ==
While the total parish population declined by one third over the 20th century, in the early 21st century a number of new homes have been built in the corner of the parish adjoining Carrickmacross town.

Killanny, as in other parts of south Monaghan, retained the Irish language to a degree into the 20th century. According to the 1911 census 9.76% of the parish could speak Irish, whilst 7.63% could in 1901. The 1901 figures show a greater number of older speakers. The dialect of Killanny would have been the now extinct East Ulster dialect, which covered the area of Antrim, Down, Armagh, Monaghan, parts of Cavan, Louth and North Meath.

== See also ==
- List of towns and villages in the Republic of Ireland
