= Ardee (barony) =

Barony in Louth, Ireland

Ardee Baile Átha Fhirdhia (Irish)
- Barony
- Interactive map of Ardee
- Sovereign state: Ireland
- County: Louth

Area
  - Total: 217.85 km^{2} (84.11 sq mi)

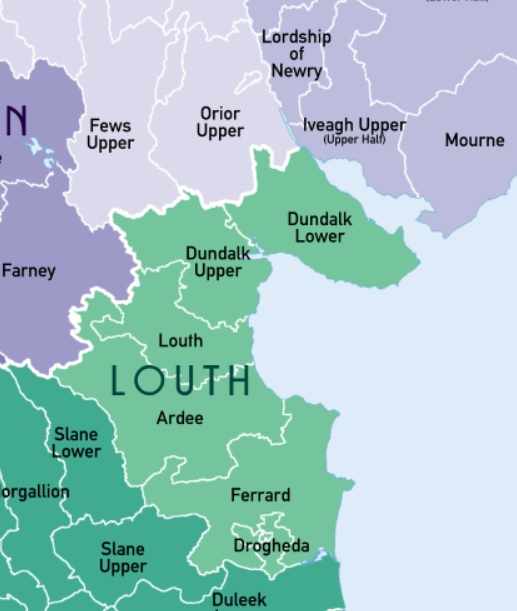
Baronies of Louth

Ardee (Irish: Baile Átha Fhirdhia) is a barony in County Louth, Ireland. Ity is named after the town of Ardee (Irish: Baile Átha Fhirdhia, "town of Ferdiad's ford").

Ardee is located in central County Louth, between the Keeran River and Dundalk Bay. The barony is bordered to the north by Louth; to the south by Ferrard; and to the west by Lower Slane, County Meath and Farney, County Monaghan.

The barony was formed from the district of Uí Seanchain (Hy Segan, Hy Seanghain, O'Shanaghan). In 841, Vikings established a longphort (raiding base) at Linn Duachaill, Annagassan.

Baron Ardee is a courtesy title of the heir of the Earl of Meath.

The Civil Parish of Killanny straddles both the Barony of Ardee in County Louth and the Barony of Farney in neighbouring County Monaghan.

== List of settlements ==
- Ardee
- Castlebellingham
