= Castletown River =

River in Ireland and Northern Ireland

Coordinates: 53°59′N 6°13′W

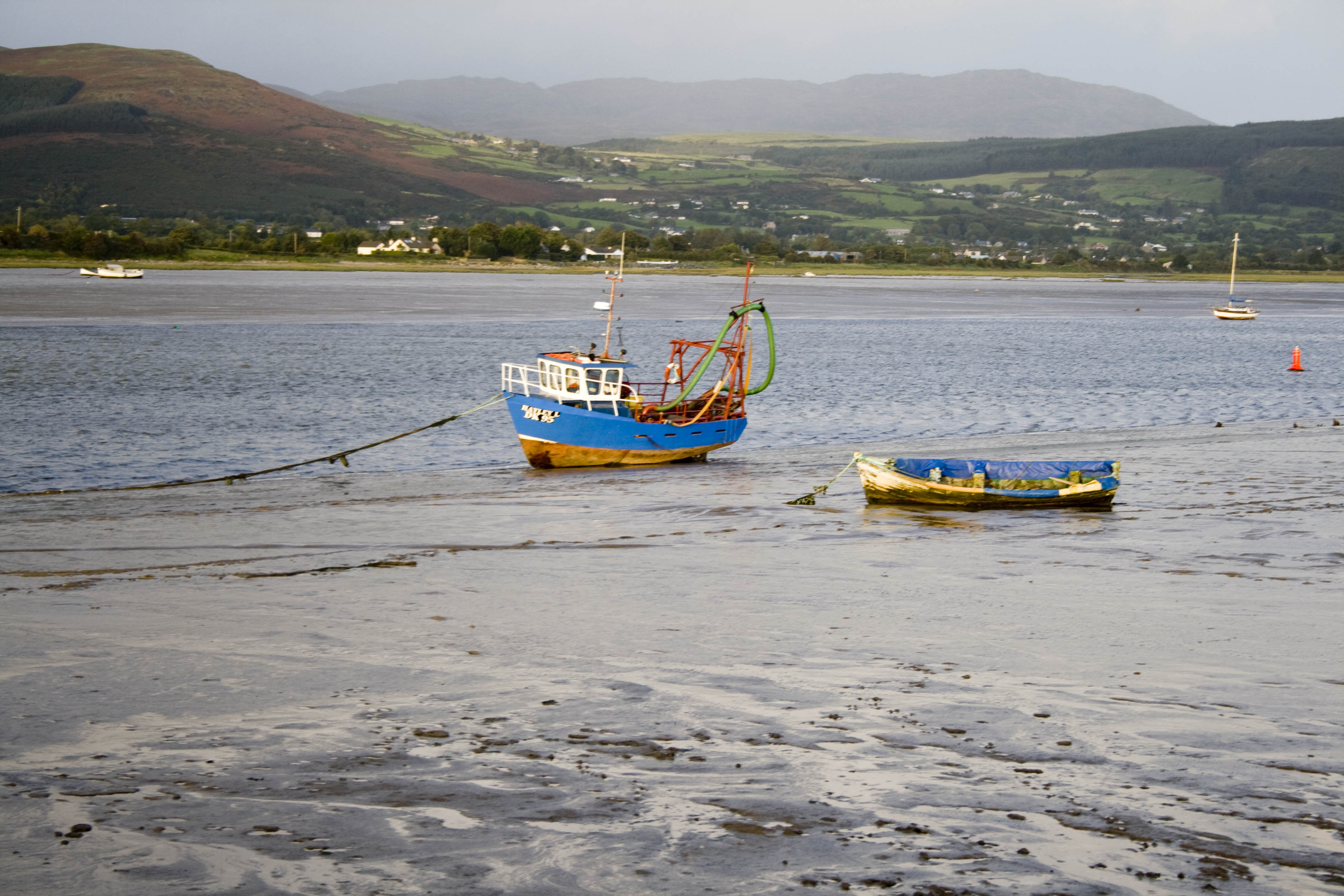
- Castletown River Estuary
- Native name: Abhainn Bhaile an Chaisleáin (Irish)

Location
- Countries: Republic of Ireland, Northern Ireland

Physical characteristics
- Source
  - location: Newtownhamilton
- Mouth
  - location: Dundalk Bay
- Length: 45 km (28 mi)

The Castletown River (Irish: Abhainn Bhaile an Chaisleáin) is a river which flows through the town of Dundalk, County Louth, Ireland. It rises near Newtownhamilton, County Armagh, Northern Ireland, and is known as the Creggan River in its upper reaches. Its two main tributaries are the Kilcurry and Falmore rivers and it enters the Irish Sea at Dundalk Bay.

== Angling ==
The river features wild brown trout, sea trout and salmon and is also stocked with brown trout. Fishing is controlled by the Dundalk Brown Trout Angling Association.

== See also ==
- List of rivers of Ireland
