= Charles Reed (footballer) =

English footballer (1882–1950)

Personal information
- Full name: Charles Reed
- Date of birth: 24 October 1882
- Place of birth: Sunderland, England
- Date of death: 1950 (aged 67)
- Place of death: County Durham, England
- Height: 5 ft 9 in (1.75 m)
- Position: Left back

Senior career*
Years	Team	Apps	(Gls)
- Sunderland West End
1905–1906	Barnsley	14	(0)
- Sunderland West End
1907–1908	Barnsley	16	(0)
1908–1909	Darlington		
1909–1910	Clapton Orient	2	(0)
1910–19??	Sunderland Rovers		
- * Club domestic league appearances and goals

Charles Reed (24 October 1882 – 1950) was an English footballer who played as a left back in the Football League for Barnsley and Clapton Orient and in non-league football for Sunderland West End, Darlington and Sunderland Rovers. (Note: Michael Joyce's 2004 edition of Football League Players' Records 1888 to 1939 lists two players called Charles Reed, both left backs. The first was born in Sunderland, played for Sunderland West End and Barnsley, and last appeared in the 1907–08 season. The second was born in Durham (whether city or county unspecified), played for Darlington, not then a Football League club so no dates given, and for Clapton Orient in 1909–10. In their report of his joining Sunderland Rovers, the Sunderland Echo explicitly treats those career paths as one continuous career pursued by a single person. The English National Football Archive has since combined its records for the "two" Charles Reeds.)

== Life and career ==
Reed was born in 1882 in Sunderland, a son of William Reed, a flour miller, and his wife Elizabeth. The 1901 Census shows the 18-year-old Reed living in Sunderland with his parents and ten siblings and apprenticed as a caulker.

He played football for Sunderland West End before signing for Barnsley as "a promising left full-back" in May 1905. He made his club and Football League debut on 23 September 1905, replacing George Stacey at left back for a Second Division match at home to Burslem Port Vale which Barnsley won 4–0. He went on to make 15 appearances in league and FA Cup, and was offered a further year despite reports that "the strains of Second Division football proved too much for him", but terms could not be agreed and he returned to Sunderland West End for 1906–07.

A year later, "now expected to bear out his early promise", Reed rejoined Barnsley. He had a run of 16 matches between mid-October and mid-January, but lost his place to Albert Milton and appeared just once more. Reed spent the 1908–09 season with North-Eastern League club Darlington, and then returned to the Football League with Clapton Orient. He played twice in their 1909–10 Second Division campaign, but would not re-sign for 1910–11 because Orient would not pay him over the summer. He returned to Sunderland where he resumed his North-Eastern League career in October 1910 with Sunderland Rovers.

The 1911 Census shows Reed living in the parental home in Lime Street, Sunderland, and working as a shipbuilders' caulker cutter. The 1939 Register finds Reed living with his wife Emily and a daughter of working age in Robinson Street, Hendon. Reed was employed as a road labourer for Sunderland Corporation and also acting as an ARP warden, while Emily was an office caretaker. Reed died in 1950; his death at the age of 67 was registered in the Durham Eastern district in the second quarter of that year.
