= Dundalk Lower =

Barony of Dundalk Lower Dún Dealgan Íochtarach (Irish)
- Barony
- Interactive map of Barony of Dundalk Lower
- Sovereign state: Ireland
- County: Louth

Area
  - Total: 154.5 km^{2} (59.7 sq mi)

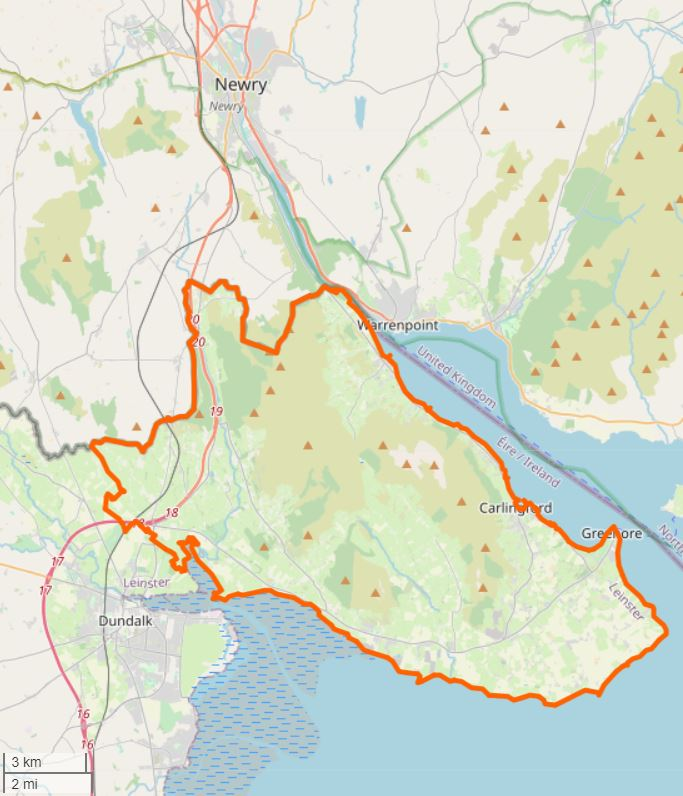
Barony of Lower Dundalk

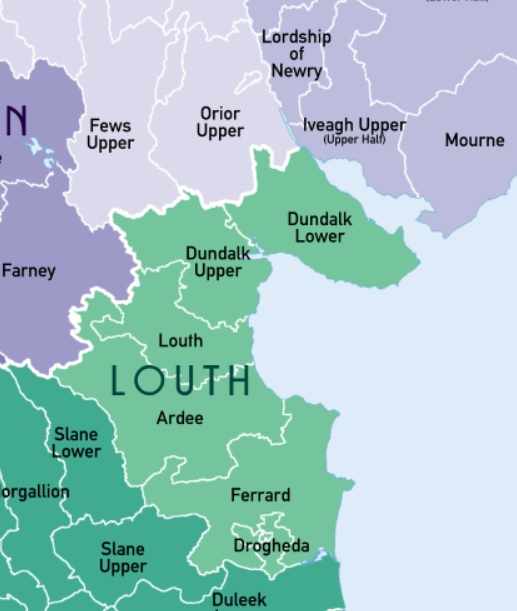
Baronies of Louth

Dundalk Lower (Irish: Dún Dealgan Íochtarach) is a barony in County Louth, Ireland.

== Etymology ==
Dundalk Lower is named after the town of Dundalk (Irish: Dún Dealgan "Dalgan's dún").

== Location ==
Dundalk Lower is found in northeast County Louth, making up all of the Cooley Peninsula.

Dundalk Lower is bordered to the west by Dundalk Upper (Irish: Dún Dealgan Uachtarach), and to the northwest by Orior Upper (Irish: Na hOirthir Uachtaracha), County Armagh, and to the northeast by Iveagh Upper, Upper Half (Irish: Uíbh Eachach Uachtarach, An Leath Uachtair), and Mourne (Irish: Múrna, Old Irish: Mughdorna) County Down.

== History ==
Dundalk Lower was formed from the territory of Fera Lorg, Lorgan, or Lurgin. In Airgíalla, the MacScannlain are found centered here in the parish of Ballymacscanlan. The barony of Dundalk was the ancient home of the Conaille Muirtheimhne. The barony was split in half by 1821.

== Civil parishes ==
There are four civil parishes in Dundalk Lower:

- Ballyboys (1 townlands)
- Ballymascanlan (33 townlands)
- Carlingford (49 townlands)
- Jonesborough (5 townlands)

== Townlands ==
There are 91 townlands.

- Aghaboys (Irish: An tÁth Buí), Ballymascanlan Civil Parish, Barony of Lower Dundalk, County Louth
- Aghameen (Irish: An tÁth Mín), Ballymascanlan Civil Parish, Barony of Lower Dundalk, County Louth
- Aghnaskeagh (Irish: Áth na Sceach), Ballymascanlan Civil Parish, Barony of Lower Dundalk, County Louth
- Anaverna (Irish: Áth na bhFearnaí), Ballymascanlan Civil Parish, Barony of Lower Dundalk, County Louth
- Annaloughan (Irish: Áth an Locháin), Ballymascanlan Civil Parish, Barony of Lower Dundalk, County Louth
- Annies (Irish: Na hEanaigh), Ballymascanlan Civil Parish, Barony of Lower Dundalk, County Louth
- Ardaghy (Irish: Ardachadh), Carlingford Civil Parish, Barony of Lower Dundalk, County Louth
- Ardtully Beg (Irish: Ardtulaigh Bheag), Carlingford Civil Parish, Barony of Lower Dundalk, County Louth
- Ardtully More (Irish: Ardtulaigh Mhór), Carlingford Civil Parish, Barony of Lower Dundalk, County Louth
- Ballagan (Irish: Baile Lagáin), Carlingford Civil Parish, Barony of Lower Dundalk, County Louth
- Ballaverty (Irish: Baile Uí Laibheartaigh), Carlingford Civil Parish, Barony of Lower Dundalk, County Louth
- Ballinteskin (Irish: Baile an tSeiscinn), Carlingford Civil Parish, Barony of Lower Dundalk, County Louth
- Ballug (Irish: Baile Loig), Carlingford Civil Parish, Barony of Lower Dundalk, County Louth
- Ballygoly (Irish: Bealach gCuaille), Ballymascanlan Civil Parish, Barony of Lower Dundalk, County Louth
- Ballymakellett (Irish: Baile Mhic Eileoid), Ballymascanlan Civil Parish, Barony of Lower Dundalk, County Louth
- Ballymascanlan (Irish: Baile Mhic Scanláin), Ballymascanlan Civil Parish, Barony of Lower Dundalk, County Louth
- Ballynamaghery (Irish: Baile na Machaire), Carlingford Civil Parish, Barony of Lower Dundalk, County Louth
- Ballynamony (Bradshaw) (Irish: Baile na Móna (Bradshaw)), Carlingford Civil Parish, Barony of Lower Dundalk, County Louth
- Ballynamony (Murphy) (Irish: Baile na Móna (Murphy)), Carlingford Civil Parish, Barony of Lower Dundalk, County Louth
- Ballyonan (Irish: Baile Uí Mhaonáin), Carlingford Civil Parish, Barony of Lower Dundalk, County Louth
- Ballytrasna (Irish: An Baile Trasna), Carlingford Civil Parish, Barony of Lower Dundalk, County Louth
- Bavan (Irish: An Bábhún), Carlingford Civil Parish, Barony of Lower Dundalk, County Louth
- Bellurgan (Irish: Baile na Lorgan), Ballyboys Civil Parish, Barony of Lower Dundalk, County Louth
- Benagh (Irish: An Beannach), Carlingford Civil Parish, Barony of Lower Dundalk, County Louth
- Broughattin (Irish: Bruach Aitinne), Ballymascanlan Civil Parish, Barony of Lower Dundalk, County Louth
- Carrickaneena (Irish: Carraig an Aonaigh), Ballymascanlan Civil Parish, Barony of Lower Dundalk, County Louth
- Carrickcarnan (Irish: Corr an Charnáin), Jonesborough Civil Parish, Barony of Lower Dundalk, County Louth
- Castlecarragh (Irish: An Caisleán Carrach), Carlingford Civil Parish, Barony of Lower Dundalk, County Louth
- Castletowncooley (Irish: Caisleán Chuaille), Carlingford Civil Parish, Barony of Lower Dundalk, County Louth
- Commons (Irish: An Coimín), Carlingford Civil Parish, Barony of Lower Dundalk, County Louth
- Cornamucklagh (Irish: Corr na Muclach), Carlingford Civil Parish, Barony of Lower Dundalk, County Louth
- Corrakit (Irish: Corr an Chait), Carlingford Civil Parish, Barony of Lower Dundalk, County Louth
- Culfore (Irish: Cúil Fobhair), Ballymascanlan Civil Parish, Barony of Lower Dundalk, County Louth
- Doolargy (Irish: An Dúleargaidh), Ballymascanlan Civil Parish, Barony of Lower Dundalk, County Louth
- Drumad (Irish: Droim Fhada), Jonesborough Civil Parish, Barony of Lower Dundalk, County Louth
- Drummullagh (Irish: Droim Mullaigh), Carlingford Civil Parish, Barony of Lower Dundalk, County Louth
- Drumnacarra (Irish: Droim na Cora), Ballymascanlan Civil Parish, Barony of Lower Dundalk, County Louth
- Drumnasillagh (Irish: Droim na Saileach), Ballymascanlan Civil Parish, Barony of Lower Dundalk, County Louth
- Earls Quarter (Irish: Ceathrú an Iarla), Carlingford Civil Parish, Barony of Lower Dundalk, County Louth
- Edentober (Irish: Éadan an Tobair), Jonesborough Civil Parish, Barony of Lower Dundalk, County Louth
- Faughart Lower (Irish: Fochaird Íochtarach), Ballymascanlan Civil Parish, Barony of Lower Dundalk, County Louth
- Faughart Upper (Irish: Fochaird Uachtarach), Ballymascanlan Civil Parish, Barony of Lower Dundalk, County Louth
- Feede (Irish: Fíd), Jonesborough Civil Parish, Barony of Lower Dundalk, County Louth
- Galtrimsland (Irish: Fearann Ghalatroma), Carlingford Civil Parish, Barony of Lower Dundalk, County Louth
- Glenmore (Irish: An Gleann Mór), Carlingford Civil Parish, Barony of Lower Dundalk, County Louth
- Grange Irish (Irish: An Ghráinseach Ghaelach), Carlingford Civil Parish, Barony of Lower Dundalk, County Louth
- Grange Old (Irish: An tSeanghráinseach), Carlingford Civil Parish, Barony of Lower Dundalk, County Louth
- Greenore (Irish: An Grianfort), Carlingford Civil Parish, Barony of Lower Dundalk, County Louth
- Jenkinstown (Irish: Baile Sheinicín), Ballymascanlan Civil Parish, Barony of Lower Dundalk, County Louth
- Killin (Irish: Cilleán), Ballymascanlan Civil Parish, Barony of Lower Dundalk, County Louth
- Knocknagoran (Irish: Cnoc na nGabhrán), Carlingford Civil Parish, Barony of Lower Dundalk, County Louth
- Liberties of Carlingford (Irish: Líbeartaí Chairlinn), Carlingford Civil Parish, Barony of Lower Dundalk, County Louth
- Lislea (Irish: An Lios Liath), Carlingford Civil Parish, Barony of Lower Dundalk, County Louth
- Loughanmore (Irish: An Lochán Mór), Ballymascanlan Civil Parish, Barony of Lower Dundalk, County Louth
- Lower Faughart (Irish: Fochaird Íochtarach), Ballymascanlan Civil Parish, Barony of Lower Dundalk, County Louth)
- Lower Rath (Irish: An Ráth Íochtarach), Carlingford Civil Parish, Barony of Lower Dundalk, County Louth)
- Lugbriscan (Irish: Log Brioscáin), Carlingford Civil Parish, Barony of Lower Dundalk, County Louth
- Maddoxgarden (Irish: Garraí Mhadóg), Carlingford Civil Parish, Barony of Lower Dundalk, County Louth
- Maddoxland (Irish: Fearann Mhadóg), Carlingford Civil Parish, Barony of Lower Dundalk, County Louth
- Millgrange (Irish: Gráinseach an Mhuilinn), Carlingford Civil Parish, Barony of Lower Dundalk, County Louth
- Monascreebe (Irish: Móin na Scríbe), Ballymascanlan Civil Parish, Barony of Lower Dundalk, County Louth
- Moneycrockroe (Irish: Móin na gCnoc Rua), Ballymascanlan Civil Parish, Barony of Lower Dundalk, County Louth
- Monksland (Irish: Fearann na Manach), Carlingford Civil Parish, Barony of Lower Dundalk, County Louth
- Mountbagnall (Irish: Moin Bhagnail), Carlingford Civil Parish, Barony of Lower Dundalk, County Louth
- Muchgrange (Irish: An Ghráinseach Mhór), Carlingford Civil Parish, Barony of Lower Dundalk, County Louth
- Mucklagh (Irish: An Muclach), Carlingford Civil Parish, Barony of Lower Dundalk, County Louth
- Mullabane (Irish: An Mullach Bán), Carlingford Civil Parish, Barony of Lower Dundalk, County Louth
- Mullaghattin (Irish: Mullach Aitinne), Carlingford Civil Parish, Barony of Lower Dundalk, County Louth
- Mullaghattin (E.D. Jenkinstown) (Irish: Mullach Aitinne), Ballymascanlan Civil Parish, Barony of Lower Dundalk, County Louth
- Mullatee (Irish: Mullach an tSí), Carlingford Civil Parish, Barony of Lower Dundalk, County Louth
- Navan (Irish: Nabhainn), Ballymascanlan Civil Parish, Barony of Lower Dundalk, County Louth
- Petestown (Irish: Baile Pheití), Carlingford Civil Parish, Barony of Lower Dundalk, County Louth
- Piedmont (Irish: Baile Mhic Dhónaill), Ballymascanlan Civil Parish, Barony of Lower Dundalk, County Louth
- Plaster (Irish: Plástar), Ballymascanlan Civil Parish, Barony of Lower Dundalk, County Louth
- Proleek (Irish: Proilíg), Ballymascanlan Civil Parish, Barony of Lower Dundalk, County Louth
- Proleek Acres (Irish: Acraí Phroilíg), Ballymascanlan Civil Parish, Barony of Lower Dundalk, County Louth
- Rampark (Irish: Páirc an Reithin), Ballymascanlan Civil Parish, Barony of Lower Dundalk, County Louth
- Rath (Irish: An Ráth), Carlingford Civil Parish, Barony of Lower Dundalk, County Louth
- Rathcor (Irish: An Ráth Corr), Carlingford Civil Parish, Barony of Lower Dundalk, County Louth
- Rath Lower (Irish: An Ráth Íochtarach), Carlingford Civil Parish, Barony of Lower Dundalk, County Louth
- Ravensdale Park (Irish: Gleann na bhFiach), Jonesborough Civil Parish, Barony of Lower Dundalk, County Louth
- Rockmarshall (Irish: Carraig an Mharascalaigh), Ballymascanlan Civil Parish, Barony of Lower Dundalk, County Louth
- Seecrin (Irish: Suí Croinn), Carlingford Civil Parish, Barony of Lower Dundalk, County Louth
- Slievenaglogh (Irish: Sliabh na gCloch), Ballymascanlan Civil Parish, Barony of Lower Dundalk, County Louth
- Spellickanee (Irish: Speilg an Fhiaigh), Ballymascanlan Civil Parish, Barony of Lower Dundalk, County Louth
- Templetown (Irish: Baile an Teampaill), Carlingford Civil Parish, Barony of Lower Dundalk, County Louth
- Tullaghomeath (Irish: Tulach Ó Méith), Carlingford Civil Parish, Barony of Lower Dundalk, County Louth
- Upper Faughart (Irish: Fochaird Uachtarach), Ballymascanlan Civil Parish, Barony of Lower Dundalk, County Louth)
- Whitemill (Irish: An Muileann Bán), Ballymascanlan Civil Parish, Barony of Lower Dundalk, County Louth
- Whitestown (Irish: Baile an Fhaoitigh), Carlingford Civil Parish, Barony of Lower Dundalk, County Louth
- Willville (Irish: An Corrbhaile), Carlingford Civil Parish, Barony of Lower Dundalk, County Louth
