= River Fane =

River in northeastern Ireland

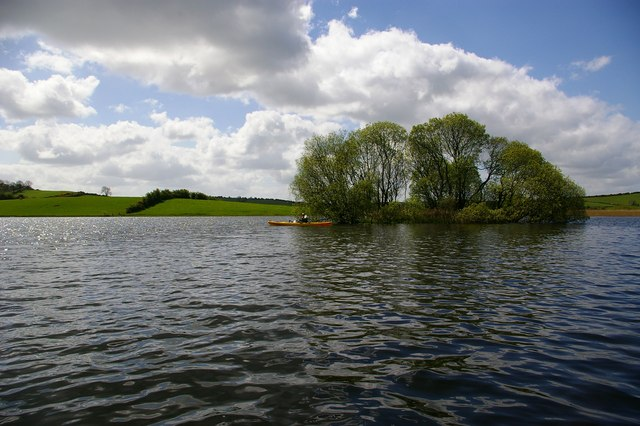
- Lough Ross, source of the Fane
- Etymology: Perhaps "river of the ford of carts"
- Native name: Abhainn Átha Féan (Irish)

Location
- Country: Ireland

Physical characteristics
- Source
  - location: Lough Ross, County Monaghan–Armagh
- Mouth
  - location: Irish Sea via Dundalk Bay
- Length: 61.56 km (38.25 mi)
- Basin size: 350 km^{2} (140 sq mi)
- Discharge
  - average: 15.39 m^{3}/s (543 cu ft/s)

The River Fane (Irish: Abhainn Átha Féan) is a river flowing from County Monaghan to Dundalk Bay in County Louth, Ireland.

== Course ==
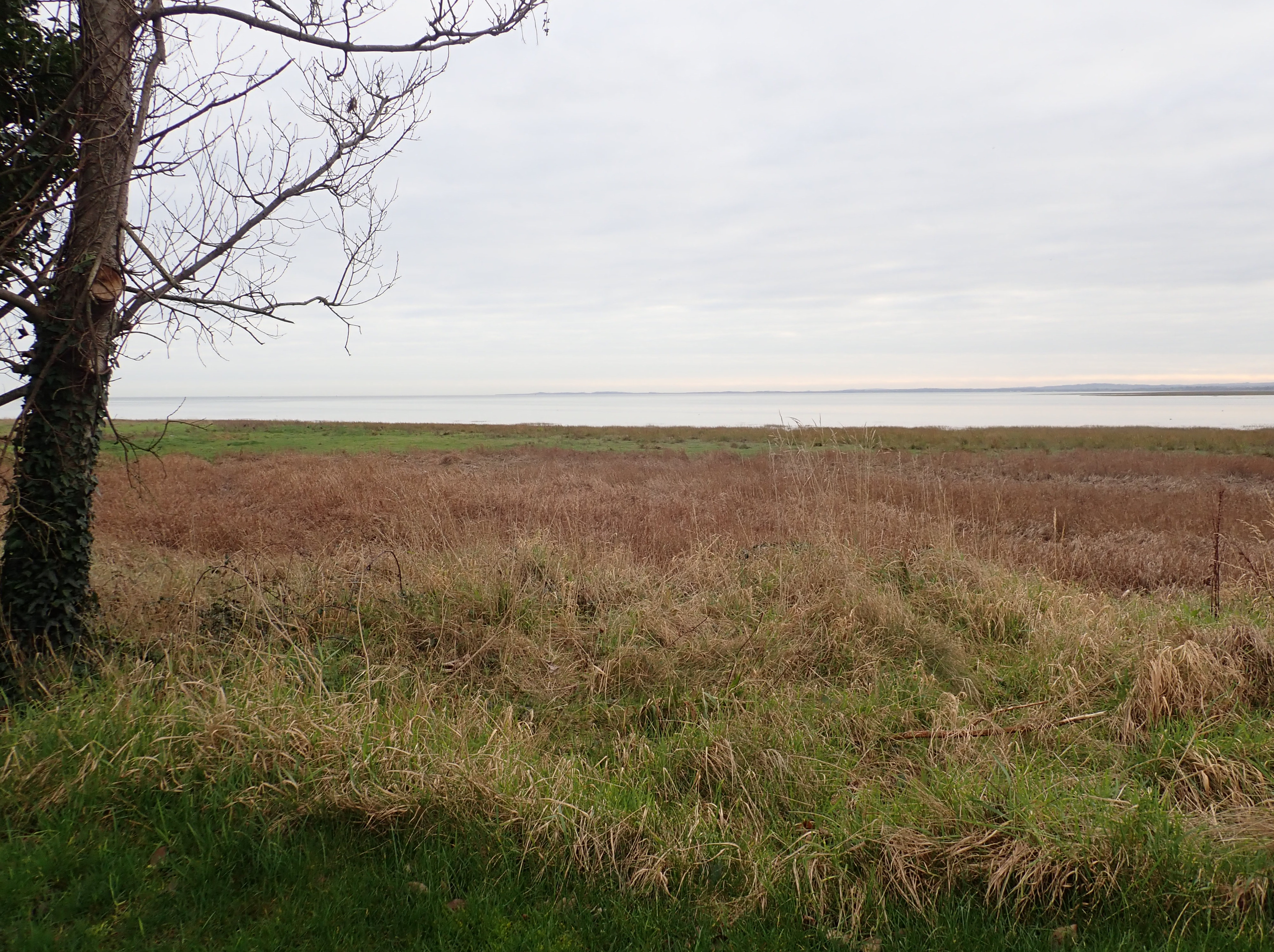
Estuary of the Fane

Originating in Lough Ross on the border of County Monaghan and County Armagh, and so of the Republic of Ireland and Northern Ireland, the Fane flows east towards Dundalk Bay, straddling the border between counties Monaghan, Louth and Armagh and flowing through Inniskeen and Knockbridge, before meeting Dundalk Bay near Blackrock, County Louth.

The River Fane is 38.25 miles long and drains an area of 350 km^{2}

== Water extraction ==
The Fane is, through the Cavan Hill pumping station, a major source of fresh water for Dundalk and the surrounding area in northern Louth.

== Pollution ==
Runoff from illegal fuel laundering operations, carried out in the region, is a major source of polycyclic aromatic hydrocarbons which have severely affected Atlantic salmon stocks in the region.

== See also ==
- Rivers of Ireland
