= Dundalk Bay =

Estuary on the east coast of Ireland

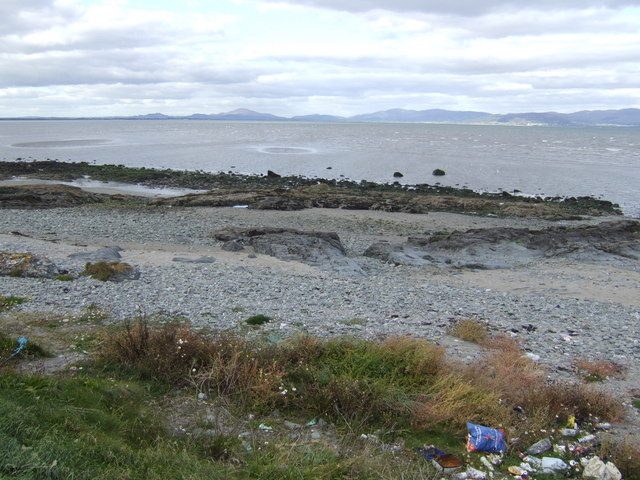
- View of Dundalk Bay from its southern shore

- Location in Ireland
- Location: Ireland
- Coordinates: 53°57′N 06°15′W

Ramsar Wetland
- Designated: 7 June 1996
- Reference no.: 834

Dundalk Bay (Irish: Cuan Dhún Dealgan) is a large (33 km^{2}), exposed estuary on the east coast of Ireland. The inner bay is shallow, sandy and intertidal, though it slopes into a deeper area 2 km from the transitional water boundary. It is predominantly influenced by the sea, though several rivers drain into the bay from the west. In the northwest corner of the bay, the Castletown River cuts through the intertidal zone and the smaller River Fane flows into the southeast corner. While the shores of the bay are largely made up of intertidal flats, there is a significant area of salt marsh on the western shore. The catchment around the bay is of mixed agriculture and urban land use.

== Special Area of Conservation ==
Dundalk Bay is a Special Area of Conservation. Its important habitats are the intertidal sand and mudflats and the extensive saltmarshes. The area of sand, gravel and mud exposed at low tide amounts to over 4,000 ha (10,000 acres). These are rich in polychaete worms, bivalve molluscs and crustaceans which are the main food for the tens of thousands of waders, gulls and waterfowl that feed here. As many as 20,000 birds regularly feed here and the site is of national and international importance for bird populations, and has been designated as a Ramsar site.

The saltmarshes are characterised by sea-purslane and common cord-grass, with common saltmarsh-grass, thrift, red fescue, common scurvygrass, sea plantain and sea rush. On the seaward margin is much glasswort. There are also banks of pebbles and areas of shingle on the foreshore, with spear-leaved orache, sea mayweed, sea beet, sea rocket, wild carrot, sea holly, sea sandwort and sea radish, with some yellow horned-poppy and lyme-grass.

== Rivers ==
Rivers which flow into Dundalk Bay:

- Several small flows from the Cooley Peninsula
- Flurry River (a.k.a. River Ballymascanlan)
- Castletown River (a.k.a. Creggan River) - 45 km (28 miles)
  - Tributary - Cully Water River (Falmore River, Dungooley River) - 23.3 km (14.5 miles)
  - Tributary - Kilcurry River (a.k.a. Forkhill River) - 18.5 km (11.5 miles)
- Rampart River, flowing through central Dundalk to join inner Dundalk Bay
- River Fane - 61.56 km (38.25 miles)
- River Glyde - 55.9 km (34.7 mi)
  - Tributary - River Dee - 60.4 km (37.5 mi)
