= Rachel Allen =

Irish celebrity chef

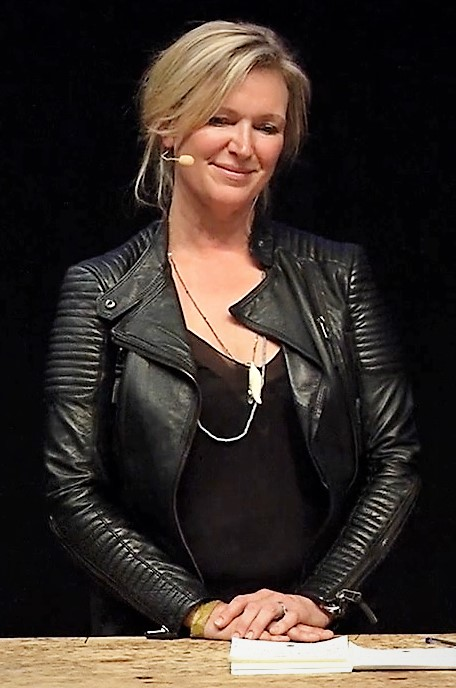
- Allen at MAD Symposium in 2014
- Born: Rachel Sheila O'Neill; 21 March 1972 (age 54); Dublin, Ireland
- Education: Dublin Institute of Technology
- Occupations: Television chef; Writer; Author; Businesswoman
- Years active: 2000–present
- Known for: TV chef
- Television: Rachel's Favourite Food; Rachel's Favourite Food for Friends; Rachel's Favourite Food at Home; Rachel Allen: Bake! The Restaurant; My Kitchen Rules
- Relatives: Darina Allen (mother-in-law); Myrtle Allen (grandmother-in-law); Lucca Allen (son) Joshua Allen (son) Scarlett Allen (daughter)
- Website: rachelallen.com

Rachel Sheila Allen (née O'Neill; born 21 March 1972) is an Irish celebrity chef, known for her work on television and as a writer. She has often appeared on Raidió Teilifís Éireann (RTÉ).

== Career as chef and writer ==
Allen went to the Ballymaloe Cookery School at the age of 18. After graduating from the school she cooked at the Ballymaloe House Hotel, eventually returning first to test recipes and then to teach at the school. She worked for a while as a caterer in Vancouver before returning to teach at Ballymaloe Cookery School.

In September 2004, RTÉ broadcast Allen's first series in Ireland Rachel's Favourite Food, which has also been broadcast in Australia, Canada and Europe, and elsewhere. A book, Rachel's Favourite Food, accompanied the series, published by Gill & Macmillan. Two further TV series and books followed, Rachel's Favourite Food for Friends and Rachel's Favourite Food at Home; reruns of the latter became part of Create's television schedule in the United States starting in September 2010.

Allen is a frequent guest on BBC's Saturday Kitchen, and was one of the presenters on the Good Food Channel's Market Kitchen show. In 2008, she was in a series called Rachel Allen: Bake! for RTÉ.

Allen has written for many Irish publications, including three years with Irish lifestyle magazine Image and a weekly column in The Sunday Tribune Magazine. She has also contributed to BBC Good Food magazine and AWT at Home magazine. Rachel's books have sold in excess of 1 million worldwide.

In 2010, Allen launched a line of products for Tipperary Crystal, including crystal stemware, porcelain dinner sets, and kitchen/dining essentials.

In 2012, she was involved in a controversy over hunting pictures of her posted on Facebook. She soon appeared as a guest on The Saturday Night Show to discuss the subject. Allen won the 2012 Irish Book Award for Best Non-Fiction for Easy Meals.

In March 2017, Allen opened her first restaurant 'Rachel's' in Cork's Washington Street, part of a business venture with her husband, Isaac, and publican Paul Montgomery. The restaurant closed on 8 August 2018, for an eight-week, a €1m revamp. The restaurant was reopened and its name changed to Dwyers of Cork, to reflect the heritage of the original Dwyer's of Cork factory.

In September 2019, Rachel Allen returned as a judge and co-host with chef Marco Pierre White on the popular Irish television series The Restaurant. Allen joined the series after food writer Tom Doorley left in 2017.

== Personal life ==
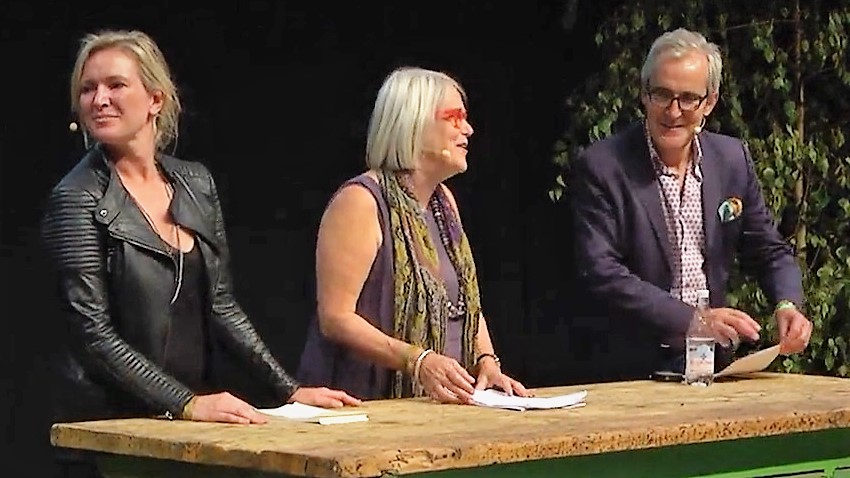
Rachel Allen, mother-in-law Darina Allen, uncle in-law Rory O'Connell, all chefs, at MAD Symposium about "Passing on Skills" in 2014

Rachel grew up in Foxrock, a suburb of Dublin, Ireland. Her Icelandic mother, Hallfríður Reichenfeld, was in the fashion business and had clothes shops. Her father, Brian O'Neill, had inherited the Winstanley shoe manufacturing business. Rachel and older sister, Simone attended Alexandra College in Milltown, Dublin, which she attended from age three to 17. It was a three-month course at Ballymaloe that sparked her passion for food. It was while attending Ballymaloe Cookery School and learning from Myrtle Allen, Rachel started dating Myrtle's grandson, Isaac, when they were both aged 18. They married in 1998. The wedding took place at Cloyne Cathedral. The reception was at Ballymaloe House and they honeymooned in New York.

After graduating from the school she cooked at the Ballymaloe House Hotel, eventually returning to teach at the school. It was when an RTE producer enrolled in a cookery course at the school asked Rachel if she would like to do a TV show.

Allen lives at a seaside home in Shanagarry, County Cork with her husband Isaac, the son of television chef Darina Allen, and their three children, Joshua, Scarlett and racing driver Lucca.

In July 2012, she received an Honorary Doctorate in Science from the University of Ulster at Belfast's Waterfront Hall for her contribution to the culinary arts. Her mother-in-law, Darina Allen, received an honorary doctorate from the same university in 2003.

== Books ==
- Rachel's Favourite Food ISBN 978-0717138982
- Rachel's Favourite Food for Friends ISBN 978-0717139996
- Bake ISBN 978-0007259700
- Rachel's Favourite Food at Home ISBN 978-0007275793
- Rachel's Food for Living ISBN 978-0007288229
- Home Cooking ISBN 978-0007259717
- Entertaining at Home Hardcover ISBN 978-0007462377
- Easy Meals ISBN 978-0007309047
- Cake ISBN 978-0007309054
- Rachel's Irish Family Food ISBN 978-0007237623
- Rachel's Everyday Kitchen ISBN 978-0007462377
- All Things Sweet Hardcover ISBN 978-0007462407
- Coast: Recipes from Ireland’s Wild Atlantic Way ISBN 978-0007462438
- Recipes from My Mother Hardcover ISBN 978-0008179793
- Home Baking Hardcover ISBN 978-0008179823
- Soup Broth Bread ISBN 978-0241486290
