= R629 road (Ireland) =

Regional road in County Cork, Ireland

Coordinates: 51°52′03″N 8°05′56″W

R629 road
- Bóthar R629
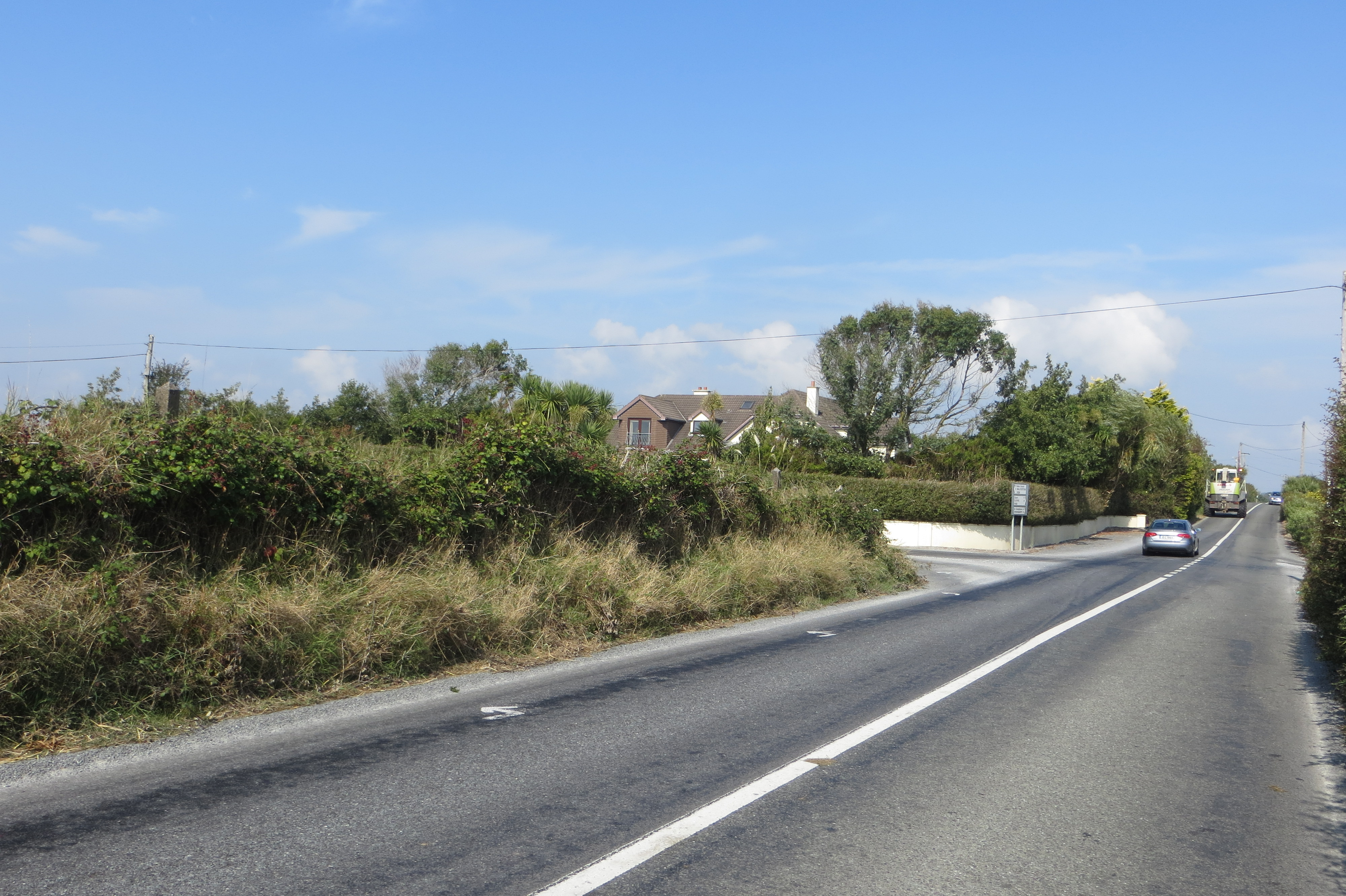
- R629 south of Shanagarry

Route information
- Length: 16.4 km (10.2 mi)

Major junctions
- From: R630 at Ballinacurra

- R631 at Cloyne R632 west of Shanagarry
- To: Ballycotton

Location
- Country: Ireland

Highway system
- Roads in Ireland; Motorways; Primary; Secondary; Regional
← R628	→ R630

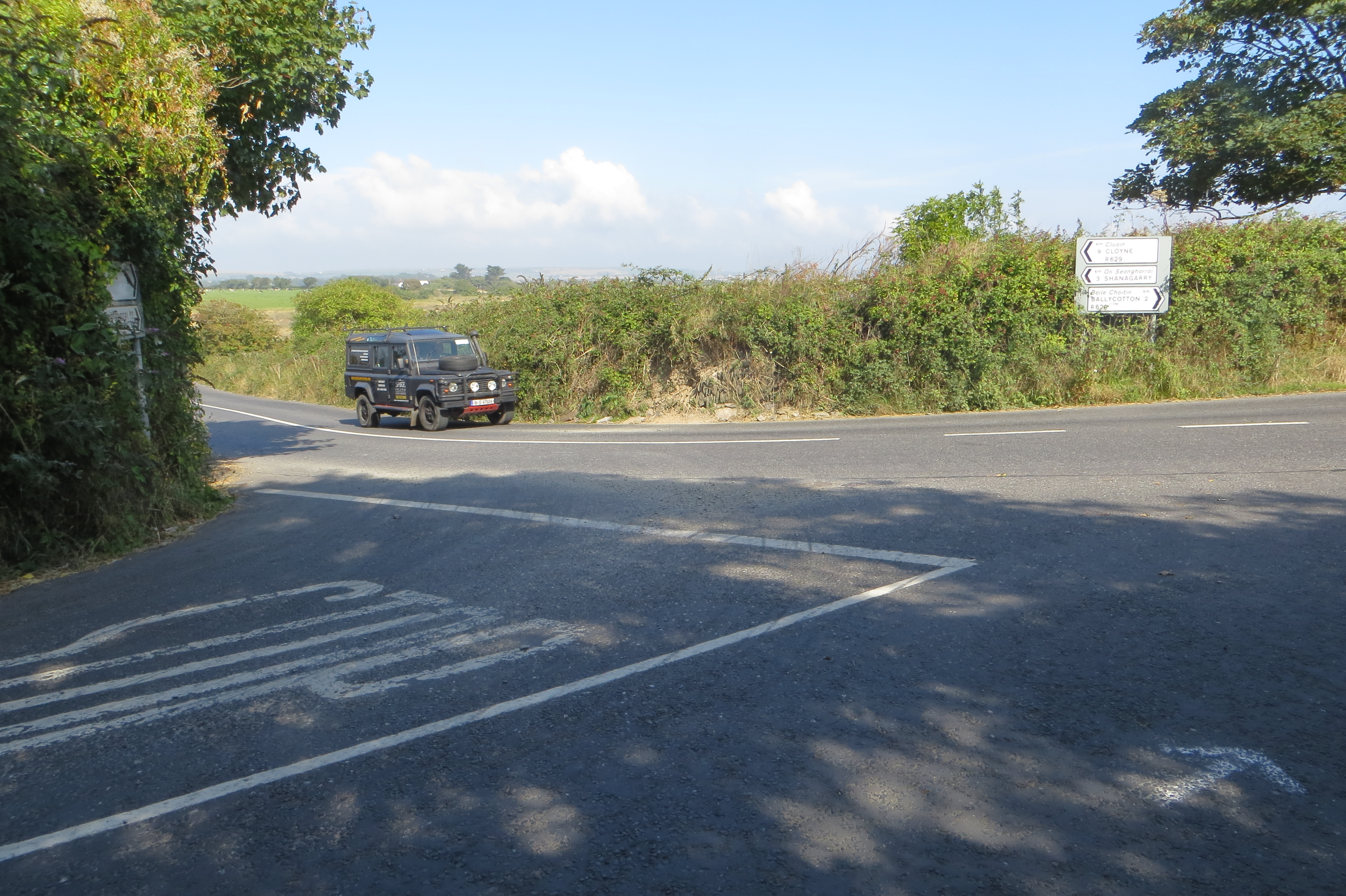
Junction of R629 and L7681

The R629 road is a regional road in southeast County Cork, Ireland. It travels from the R630 road at Ballinacurra's grotto, southeastwards through Kearney's Cross and Cloyne (where it turns eastwards), past Ballymaloe House and Shanagarry, into Ballycotton. The statutary definition gives it as beginning at the R907 in Midleton, but all maps and other material assign the Midleton–Ballinacurra stretch to the R630 instead.
