= R630 road (Ireland) =

Regional road in County Cork, Ireland

Coordinates: 51°51′22″N 8°09′51″W

R630 road
- Bóthar R630
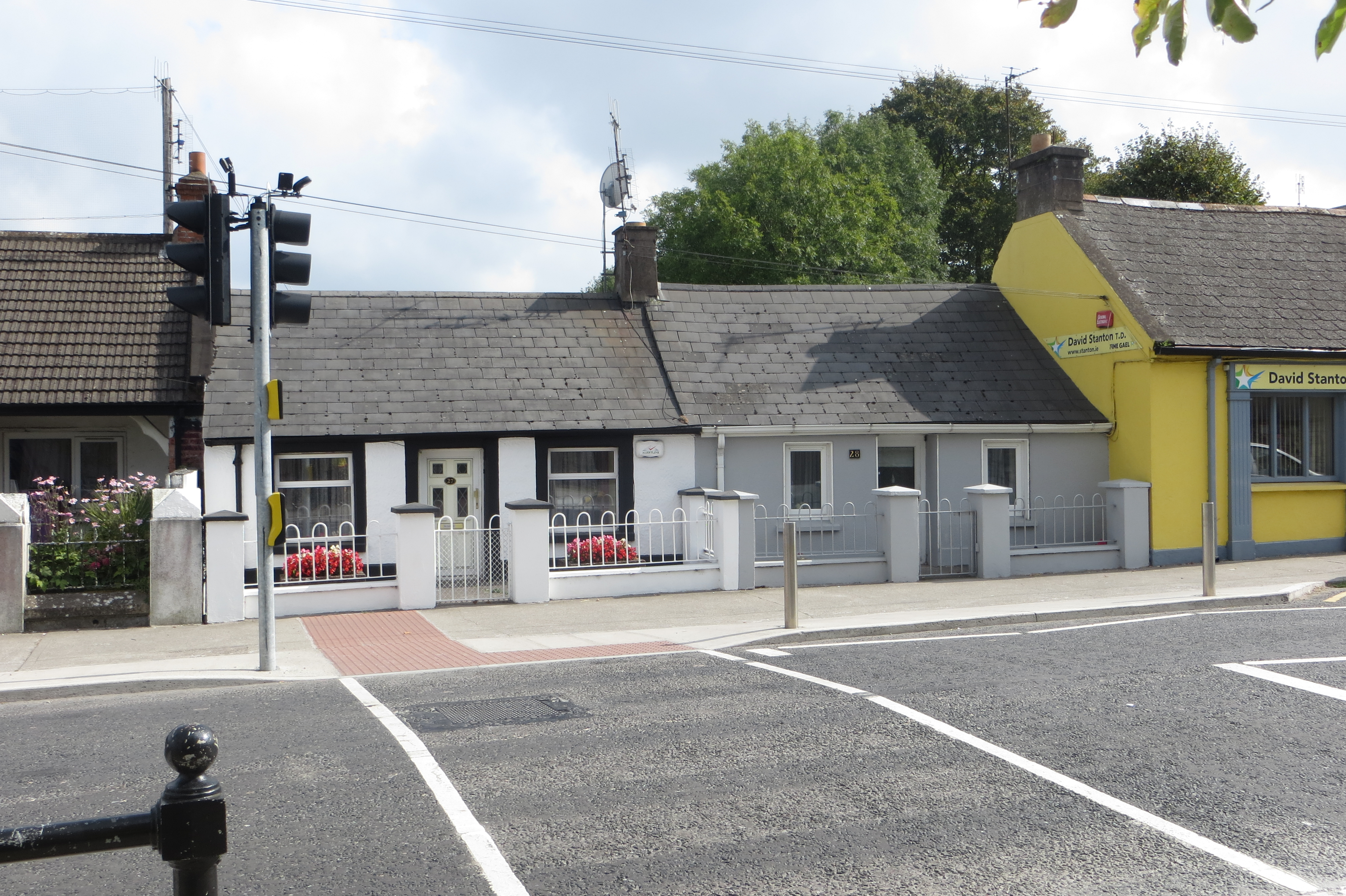
- R630 in Midleton

Route information
- Length: 14.0 km (8.7 mi)

Major junctions
- From: R907 at Midleton

- N25 at Lake View Roundabout R629 at Ballinacurra; R631 at Whitewell Cross
- To: Whitegate

Location
- Country: Ireland

Highway system
- Roads in Ireland; Motorways; Primary; Secondary; Regional
← R629	→ R631

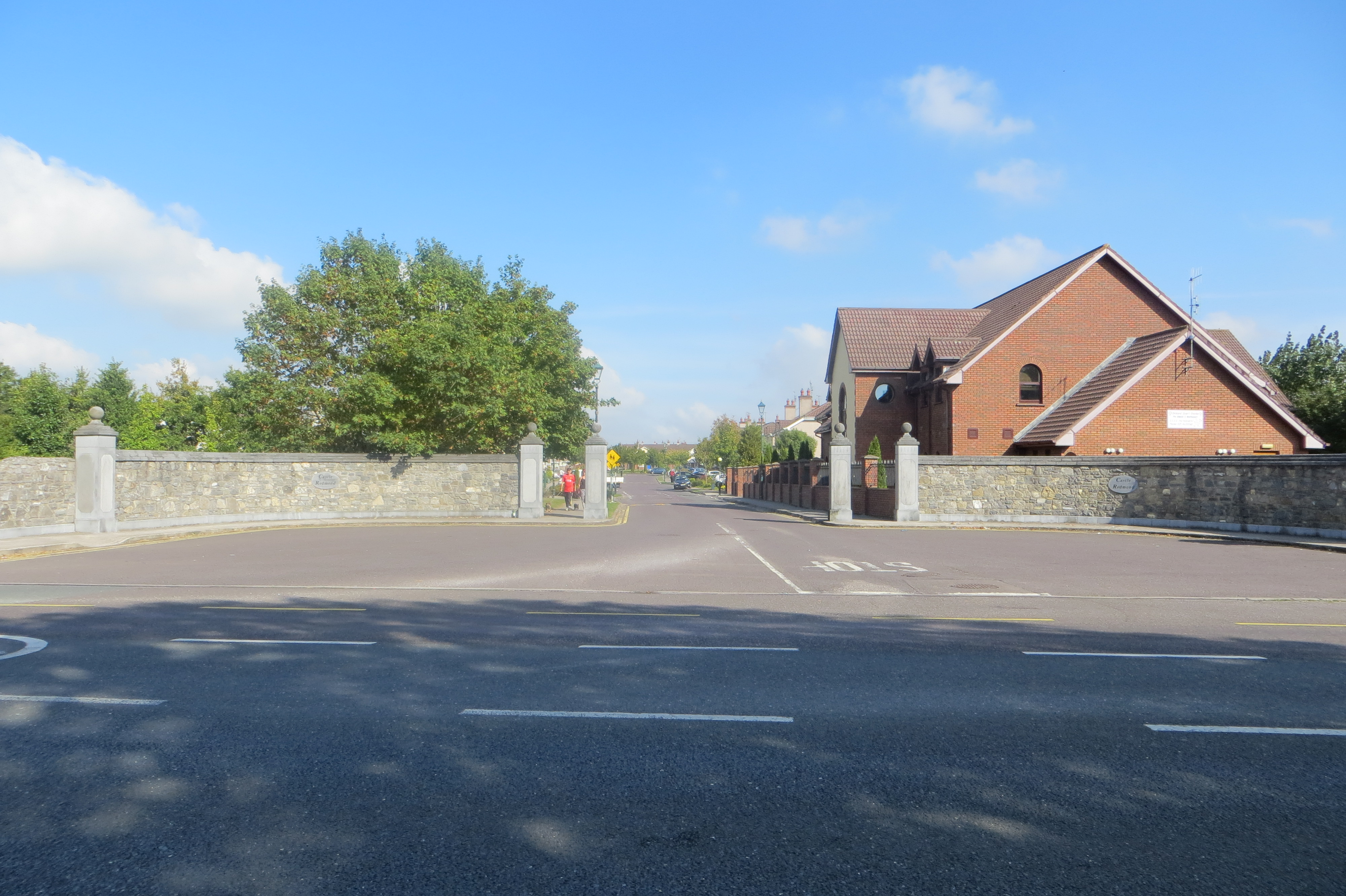
R630 in Ballinacurra

The R630 road is a regional road in southeast County Cork, Ireland. It travels from the R907 road at Midleton's Youghal Road, southwards through Ballinacurra, and westwards through Rostellan, turning south again through Whitegate. The statutary definition gives it as beginning at the R629 in Ballinacurra, but all maps and other material assign the Midleton–Ballinacurra stretch to the R630.
