= Womanagh River =

River in County Cork, Ireland

Coordinates: 51.897357°N 8.111683°W

- Etymology: Irish fuaimneach, "noisy"
- Native name: An Uaimneach (Irish)

Location
- Country: Ireland

Physical characteristics
- Source
  - location: Knocknastrickeen, County Cork
- Mouth
  - location: Celtic Sea at Pilmore
- Length: 31 kilometres (19 mi)

Basin features
- Tributaries
  - left: River Dissour, Kiltha River

The Womanagh River (Irish: An Uaimneach) is a river in County Cork, Ireland.

== Course ==
The Womanagh River rises on Knockastrickeen and flows eastwards through Ladysbridge and loops around northwards, eastwards and southwards. It passes under the R633 at the Cromponn Bridge and flows into the Celtic Sea.

== Wildlife ==
Fish include brown trout, salmon, brook lamprey, stickleback and stone loach.

== Archaeology ==
A bronze sword was found in the river in 1883.
