= MAD Symposium =

Annual food symposium

The MAD Symposium was an annual symposium held in Copenhagen, Denmark featuring presentations from chefs, farmers, academics, thinkers, and artists. The event was hosted by the MAD Food Organization, founded in 2011 by Danish chef René Redzepi, the founder of the Copenhagen-based restaurant, Noma. The two-day symposium took place inside a circus tent along the waterfront of Refshaleøen. The audience for MAD consisted predominantly of chefs, aspiring cooks, farmers, journalists, and other food service professionals.

== Philosophy ==
MAD's purpose was to educate and raise awareness among modern chefs and food professionals, to better prepare them for the challenges and responsibilities that went beyond merely providing sustenance for a single meal. The symposium aimed to feature speakers from diverse disciplines, offering different perspectives on food and culture while providing those in the kitchens with new knowledge and greater imagination.

== Organization structure ==
MAD was a not-for-profit grassroots operation composed of a full-time team and collaborators spread throughout Europe, Australia, and the United States.

== Main events ==
=== MAD4 ===
The fourth MAD Symposium took place on 24th and 25th of August, 2014 and was co-curated by D.O.M. chef and founder Alex Atala.

- Albert Adria — Chef, Spain
- Alex Atala — Chef, Brazil
- Anya von Bremzen — Journalist, Russia
- Chris Cosentino— Chef, USA
- Chris Ying — Journalist, USA
- Christine Muhlke — Author, USA
- Darina Allen — Chef, Ireland
- Eric Schlosser— Journalist, USA
- Eyvind Hellstrøm — Chef, Norway
- Fulvio Pierangeli — Chef, Italy
- Hervé This — Chemist, France
- Isabel Soares— Activist, Portugal
- Jeremiah Tower — Chef, USA
- Julian Baggini — Philosopher, UK
- Madhur Jaffrey — Author, UK
- Olivier Roellinger — Chef, France
- Paola Antonelli — Curator, USA
- Paul Freedman — Historian, USA
- Pierre Koffmann — Chef, UK/France
- Ron Finley — Urban gardener, USA
- Silvano Giraldin— Restaurant manager, UK
- Tatiana Levha — Chef, France
- Tatsuru Rai— Chef, Japan

=== MAD3 ===
The third MAD took place on 25th and 26th August 2013, and was curated by Momofuku chef and founder David Chang and the editors of Lucky Peach magazine. The theme of the symposium was "guts."

MAD3 Speakers:

- Alex Atala — Chef, Brazil
- Vandana Shiva — Environmental Activist, India
- Dario Cecchini — Butcher, Italy
- Christian Puglisi — Chef, Denmark
- Margot Henderson — Chef, United Kingdom
- Sandor Katz — Fermentation Revivalist, USA
- Jon Reiner — Author, USA
- Pascal Barbot — Chef, France
- Diana Kennedy — Author, Mexico/UK
- Roy Choi — Chef, USA
- Cynthia Sandberg & David Kinch — Farmer & Chef, USA
- Heribert Watzke — Food Scientist, Switzerland
- Martha Payne — Schoolgirl Activist, Scotland
- Alain Ducasse — Chef, France
- David Choe — Artist, USA
- Josh Whiteland — Guide, Australia
- Barbara Lynch — Chef, USA
- Knud Romer — Author, Denmark
- Daniel Klein & Mirra Fine — Activist Filmmakers, United States
- Ahmed Jama — Chef, Somalia
- Jonathan Gold — Writer, USA
- Michael Twitty — Food Historian, USA
- Jason Box — Glaciologist, USA/Denmark
- Roland Rittman — Forager, Sweden

=== MAD2 ===
The second MAD took place on the 1st and 2nd of July, 2012. The theme of the symposium was "appetite."

MAD2 Speakers:

- Tor Nørretranders — Writer, Denmark
- Roderick Sloan — Sea Urchin Diver and Ocean Explorer, Norway
- David Chang — Chef, USA
- Enrique Olvera — Chef, Mexico
- Massimo Bottura — Chef, Italy
- Hugh Fearnley-Whittingstall — Activist Chef, UK
- Shinichiro Takagi — Chef, Japan
- Andrea Pieroni — Ethnobiologist, Italy
- Patrick Johansson — Butter Viking, Sweden
- Dan Barber — Chef, USA
- Chido Govera — Mushroom Farmer, Zimbabwe
- Paul Rozin — Psychologist, USA
- Anthony Myint & Danny Bowien — Mission Chinese Food, USA
- Massimo Montanari — Historian, Italy
- Rasmus Kofoed — Chef, Denmark
- Nordic Food Lab — Denmark
- Andrea Petrini — Writer, Italy
- Wylie Dufresne — Chef, USA
- Leif Sørensen — Chef, Faroe Islands
- Fergus Henderson and Trevor Gulliver — Chef and Restaurateur, UK
- Ferran Adrià — Chef, Spain

=== MAD1 ===
The inaugural MAD took place on 27th and 28th of August, 2011. The theme of the symposium was "vegetation."

MAD1 Speakers:

- Alex Atala — Chef, Brazil
- Tør Norretranders — Writer, Denmark
- Miles Irving — Forager, UK
- Daniel Patterson — Chef, USA
- Yoshihiro Narisawa — Chef, Japan
- Hans Herren — Policymaker, Switzerland
- Kamal Mouzawak — Community leader, Lebanon
- Iñaki Aizpitarte — Chef, France
- Thomas Hartung — Businessman, Denmark
- Magnus Nilsson — Chef, Sweden
- Jacqueline McGlade — Head of the EEA, UK
- Ben Shewry — Chef, New Zealand
- Stefano Mancuso — Biologist, Italy
- François Couplan — Forager, France
- Massimo Bottura — Chef, Italy
- Søren Wiuff — Farmer, Denmark
- Molly Jahn — Policymaker, USA
- Michel Bras — Chef, France
- Harold McGee — Writer, USA
- David Chang — Chef, USA
- Andoni Luis Aduriz — Chef, Spain
- Gastón Acurio — Chef, Peru

== Other events ==
=== MAD Mondays ===
To prompt discussion on a local level and include those outside of the restaurant trade in the MAD community, the organization staged MAD Mondays, a series of panel discussions on food culture.

In March 2014, MAD hosted a New York City edition, its first outside of Copenhagen. The talk was titled "What We Talk About When We Talk About Being a Chef," and took place at the Drawing Center, featuring Peter Meehan as moderator and Mario Batali, Gabrielle Hamilton, Bill Buford, Lee Hanson, and Riad Nasr as panelists.

=== MADFeed ===
The MADFeed was an online publication that extended the MAD conversation throughout the year. The platform hosted news and video from MAD events, as well as articles from the MAD team. Notable guests and features in these publishings included chefs Dan Barber and Margot Henderson, musician James Murphy, and artist Olafur Eliasson.
