= R628 road (Ireland) =

Regional road in Ireland

R628 road
- Bóthar R628

Route information
- Length: 19.1 km (11.9 mi)

Major junctions
- From: R626 at Ballinterry Cross, County Cork

- To: R634 at The Square, Tallow, County Waterford

Location
- Country: Ireland

Highway system
- Roads in Ireland; Motorways; Primary; Secondary; Regional
← R627	→ R629

The R628 road is a regional road in Ireland. It runs between the R626 near Rathcormac in County Cork and the R634 at Tallow, County Waterford, via the village of Conna. The R628 is 19.1 kilometres (11.9 mi) long, most of which is County Cork.
