= R626 road (Ireland) =

Regional road in County Cork, Ireland

R626 road
- Bóthar R626
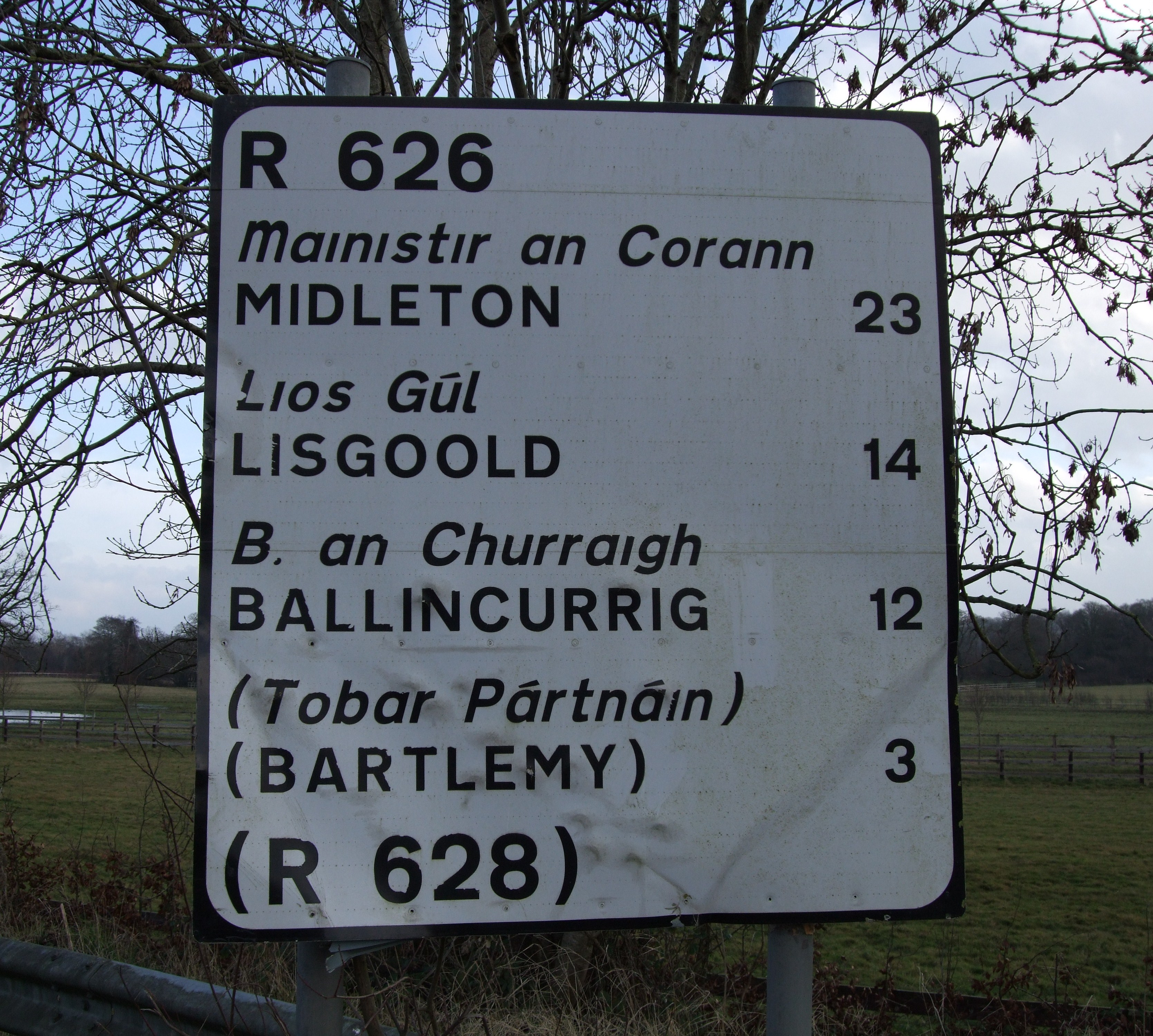
- Sign at northern end of R626

Route information
- Length: 23.0 km (14.3 mi)

Major junctions
- From: R639 at Doctor Barry’s Bridge, County Cork

- R628 at Ballinterry Cross

- To: R907 at Main Street, Midleton

Location
- Country: Ireland

Highway system
- Roads in Ireland; Motorways; Primary; Secondary; Regional
← R624	→ R627

The R626 is a regional road in County Cork, Ireland. The route begins 1 km (0.6 mi) south of Rathcormac at its junction with the R639 and travels southeast for 23 km (14 mi) until it arrives at Midleton. The R626 is entirely in County Cork.

== See also ==
- Roads in Ireland
