= Ladysbridge =

Village in County Cork, Ireland

Ladysbridge Irish: Droichead na Scuab
- Village
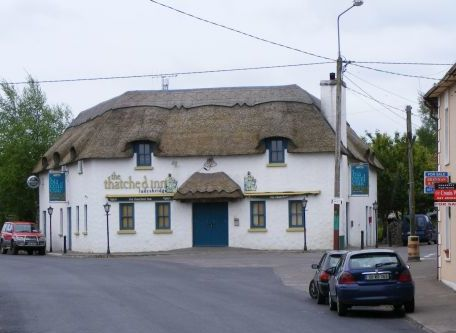
- Thatched Inn pub in Ladysbridge

- Location in Ireland
- Coordinates: 51.896°N 8.036°W
- Country: Ireland
- Province: Munster
- County: County Cork

Population (2022)
  - Total: 809
- Time zone: UTC+0 (WET)
  - Summer (DST): UTC-1 (IST (WEST))

Ladysbridge (Irish: Droichead na Scuab), previously known for census purposes as Knockglass (Irish: An Cnoc Glas), is a village in County Cork, Ireland. As of the 2016 census, the area had a population of 658 people. In 2022, Ladysbridge had a population of 809.

The village of Ladysbridge lies at the junction of the R632 and R633 regional roads, approximately 1.5 kilometres (0.93 mi) south of Castlemartyr. Ladysbridge, sometimes spelled Lady's Bridge, is also connected to Castlemartyr via a way-marked nature trail. This walking route crosses the nearby Womanagh River on a pedestrian bridge.

Ightermurragh Castle is a 17th-century fortified house which is located on the south bank of the Womanagh River approximately 2 kilometres (1.2 mi) east of Ladysbridge village. Within the village itself, a number of buildings date from the 19th century, including the former national school (dated 1891) and Ladysbridge Roman Catholic church (dated to c.1820). This church, which is dedicated to Saint Mary, is in the parish of Ballymacoda and Ladysbridge and the Roman Catholic Diocese of Cloyne. The local GAA club, Fr. O'Neill's GAA, represents the same parish area.

A monument in the centre of the village commemorates the Manchester Martyrs, one of whom was from the Ladysbridge area.
