= Rachel Allen: Bake! =

- Genre: Cookery
- Presented by: Rachel Allen
- Starring: Rachel Allen
- Country of origin: Ireland
- Original language: English
- No. of seasons: 1
- No. of episodes: 17 (including 2 specials)

Production
- Production location: Ireland/United Kingdom
- Running time: 30 minutes

Original release
- Network: RTÉ One
- Release: 15 October 2008 – 11 February 2009

Related
- Nationwide; Lotto

Rachel Allen: Bake! is an Irish cookery television show presented by Rachel Allen and broadcast on RTÉ One each Wednesday at 7:30pm. The first episode aired on 15 October 2008. Each episode was made available to watch online for 21 days after original transmission.

In the United Kingdom, the show airs from time to time on the Good Food channel, it has also become part of the Saturday morning schedule on BBC One. In the United States, it airs on Cooking Channel.

== Episodes ==
Date	Title	Ref
15 October 2008	White Chocolate Blondies/Lemon Tarts	
22 October 2008	Walnut Cake/Cookies	
29 October 2008	Carrot Cake/White Yeast Bread	
5 November 2008	Quiche Lorraine/Pink Meringues	
12 November 2008	Tart Tatin/Chocolate Cake	
19 November 2008	Macaroons, Pastries And Soda Bread	
26 November 2008	Mini Pissaladiere/Dutch Apple Cake	
3 December 2008	Iced Orange Cake/Goat Cheese Tart	
10 December 2008	Baklava Swiss Rolls	
7 January 2009	Lime Yogurt Cake And Sticky Toffee Pudding	
14 January 2009	Poppy Seed Cake/Bagels	
21 January 2009	Marble Cake/Lemon Cupcakes	
28 January 2009	Beef Pasties/Brown Sugar Custards	
4 February 2009	Meringue Roulade/Sweet Scones	
11 February 2009	Baked Cheesecake/Éclairs	
15 December 2008	Christmas Bake Part 1	
21 December 2008	Christmas Bake Part 2	

== Recipes ==
- Calzone Puttanesca
- Lemon cupcakes
- Pissaladiere
- Red Velvet Cake
- Spinach, potato and goat's cheese tart
- Coconut meringue roulade with lemon curd cream and raspberries
- Baked cheesecake with blueberries
