= R631 road (Ireland) =

Regional road in County Cork, Ireland

Coordinates: 51°51′27″N 8°08′34″W

R631 road
- Bóthar R631

Route information
- Length: 3.2 km (2.0 mi)

Major junctions
- From: R630 at Whitewell Cross

- To: R629 at Cloyne

Location
- Country: Ireland

Highway system
- Roads in Ireland; Motorways; Primary; Secondary; Regional
← R630	→ R632

The R631 road is a short regional road in County Cork, Ireland. It travels from the R630 road at Whitewell Cross, Crochane, eastwards into the crossroads at Rock Street, Cloyne.
