= Penn Castle =

House in County Cork, Ireland

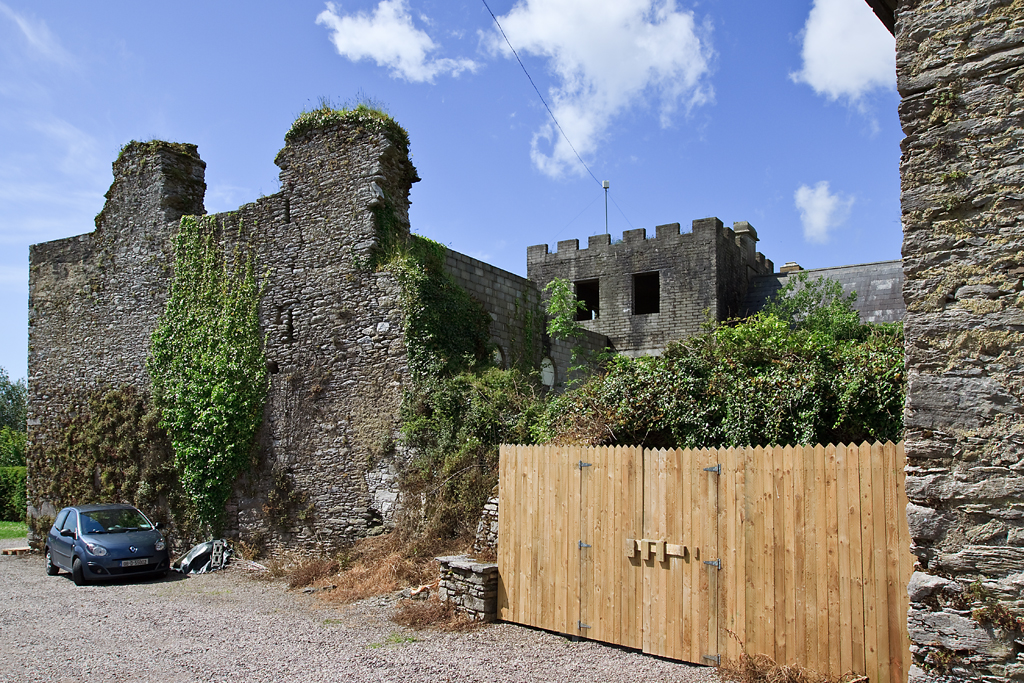
- Interactive map of the Penn Castle area
- Alternative names: Shanagarry House

General information
- Type: House
- Architectural style: Gothic
- Classification: Protected structure
- Location: County Cork, Shanagarry, Ireland
- Coordinates: 51.85162°N 8.03373°W
- Named for: Admiral William Penn
- Construction started: 1450

Penn Castle or Shanagarry Castle is a house incorporating a crenellated tower house in Shanagarry, County Cork in Ireland. Originally built up from c. 1450 as a defensive castle by the Power (De la Poer) family, the building also contains elements of structures from 1650, 1750 and 1900. Shanagarry Castle is included in the Record of Protected Structures maintained by Cork County Council.

== History ==
The "core" 15th-century tower house on the site is traditionally associated with the Anglo-Norman Power (De la Poer) family.

By the 17th century (c. 1667), it was the home of Admiral William Penn and was received as compensation along with 7,000 acres for losing the far larger Macroom Castle, also in County Cork which reverted to Donough MacCarty, 1st Earl of Clancarty after the Stuart Restoration of 1660. His son William Penn lived at Shanagarry intermittently during the late 1660s and it was at this point that he became committed to Quakerism which ultimately lead him to the founding of Pennsylvania.

William Penn's grandson, also named William, lived principally at the castle with his wife Anne Vaux from 1736. On his death in 1746, she remarried Alexander Durdin and they lived at the property for just 60 days before she also died.

In 1841, the castle was the home of a descendant of the Penn family, Thomas G Durdin and works were carried out for him on the main house, the coach house and the steward's house by the Cork architect Henry Hill.

By 1942, the house was in possession of the Brazier family.

Archaelogical excavations took place at the house in 1994 as part of a nearby development.

== See also ==
- Ballymaloe House, nearby country house which also contains elements of an earlier tower house
