= Myrtle Allen =

Irish chef (1924–2018)

- Born: Myrtle Hill; 13 March 1924; Tivoli, Cork, Ireland
- Died: 13 June 2018 (aged 94); Cork, Ireland
- Occupation: Chef
- Employer: Self-employed
- Known for: Ballymaloe House
- Spouse: Ivan Allen
- Children: 6

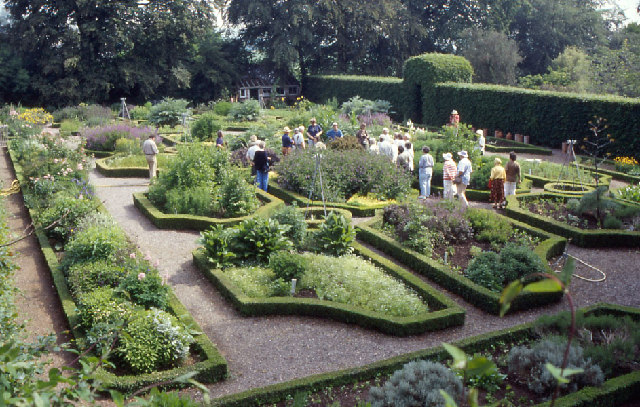
Kinoith

Myrtle Allen (born Myrtle Hill, 13 March 1924 – 13 June 2018) was an Irish chef. She was head chef and co-owner of the Michelin-starred restaurant The Yeats Room at Ballymaloe House in Shanagarry, County Cork. Besides her career in cooking, she was also a writer, hotelier and teacher.

== Personal life ==
Myrtle Hill was the daughter of Henry Houghton Hill, granddaughter of Arthur Hill, and great-granddaughter of Henry Hill, all respected architects in Cork. She was a member of the Religious Society of Friends (Quakers).

In 1943, she married Ivan Allen, a vegetable grower, who was working at the farm Kinoith in Shanagarry. In 1947, the couple bought Ballymaloe House and the surrounding farm. Ivan managed the fruit and vegetable farm and worked on Kinoith, while his wife took care of the children and the manor. Later, in 1958, Ivan Allen inherited Kinoith from Wilson Strangman, the deceased owner.

As her husband was a successful grower of fruit and vegetables, she had an abundance of fresh products in her kitchen. Under the guidance of her husband, an avid gourmet, she learned to cook by taking cooking courses at the School of Commerce and self-study. By 1962, she was cookery correspondent of the Irish Farmers Journal. Originally the Irish Farmers Journal was a publication of Macra na Feirme. Myrtle Allen was very active in this young farmers' organisation, eventually becoming vice president for the Munster Region of the National Council of Macra na Feirme in 1959. A bid for the presidency in 1963 was unsuccessful.

She was married to her husband Ivan until his death in 1998. Allen, aged 94, died of pneumonia on 13 June 2018 at Cork University Hospital.

== Culinary career ==
In 1964, she decided to start a restaurant in her own dining room dubbed The Yeats Room., as the Allens had several paintings by Jack Yeats. Her philosophy of using local artisanal ingredients and changing her menu daily to reflect the best offerings of the season was "revolutionary at the time." She summed up her philosophy of food in the following nine words "local, seasonal, organic, flavoursome, sustainable and superbly cooked food". Later she changed a few unused rooms into rooms for a guesthouse, which grew into the hotel Ballymaloe is today. By the 1960s she and her sous-chef, Darina O'Connell, started giving courses in cooking. Later Darina, by then married to Myrtle's son Tim Allen, moved the cookery classes to Kinoith under the name of Ballymaloe Cookery School.

In 1986, Allen was part of founding Euro-toques International and founder of Euro-toques Ireland. Euro-toques is an organisation of professional cooks promoting and protecting Europe's culinary heritage, and defending the quality of local and carefully cooked food. She served as president of the international body from 1994 to 1997.

In 2013, Myrtle Allen was the subject of a documentary, Myrtle Allen: A Life in Food, which aired on RTÉ Television.

== Legacy ==
She has been called the "renowned matriarch of Modern Irish cuisine," "the leading light of modern-day Irish cooking," and "as important to her country's cuisine as Alice Waters was to America's."

== Awards ==
- 1975–1980: one Michelin star
- 1975–1981, 1983–1984 and 1987–1988: one star in the Egon Ronay Guide
- 1981–1994: Red M awarded by the Michelin Guide
- 1984: Cesar Award in the Good Hotel Guide
- 1988: Ballymaloe House included in the Courvoisier book of best hotels
- 1990: the Ackerman Martell Guide the black four-leaved clover for excellence in all aspects of the hotel and restaurant business
- 1991: Ballymaloe House included in Harpers and Queen 'The one hundred Best Hotels in the World'
- 2000: Degree of Doctor of Laws, honoris causa – awarded by the University College Cork
- 2011: Taste Icon award – presented by Taste of Dublin
- 2011: Lifetime Achievement Award – Women and Agriculture Awards
- 2014: Lifetime Achievement Award from the Irish Food Writers' Guild

== Books ==
- The Ballymaloe Cookbook; 1984
- Myrtle Allen's Cooking at Ballymaloe House; 1990
