= R634 road (Ireland) =

Regional road in Ireland

R634 road
- Bóthar R634
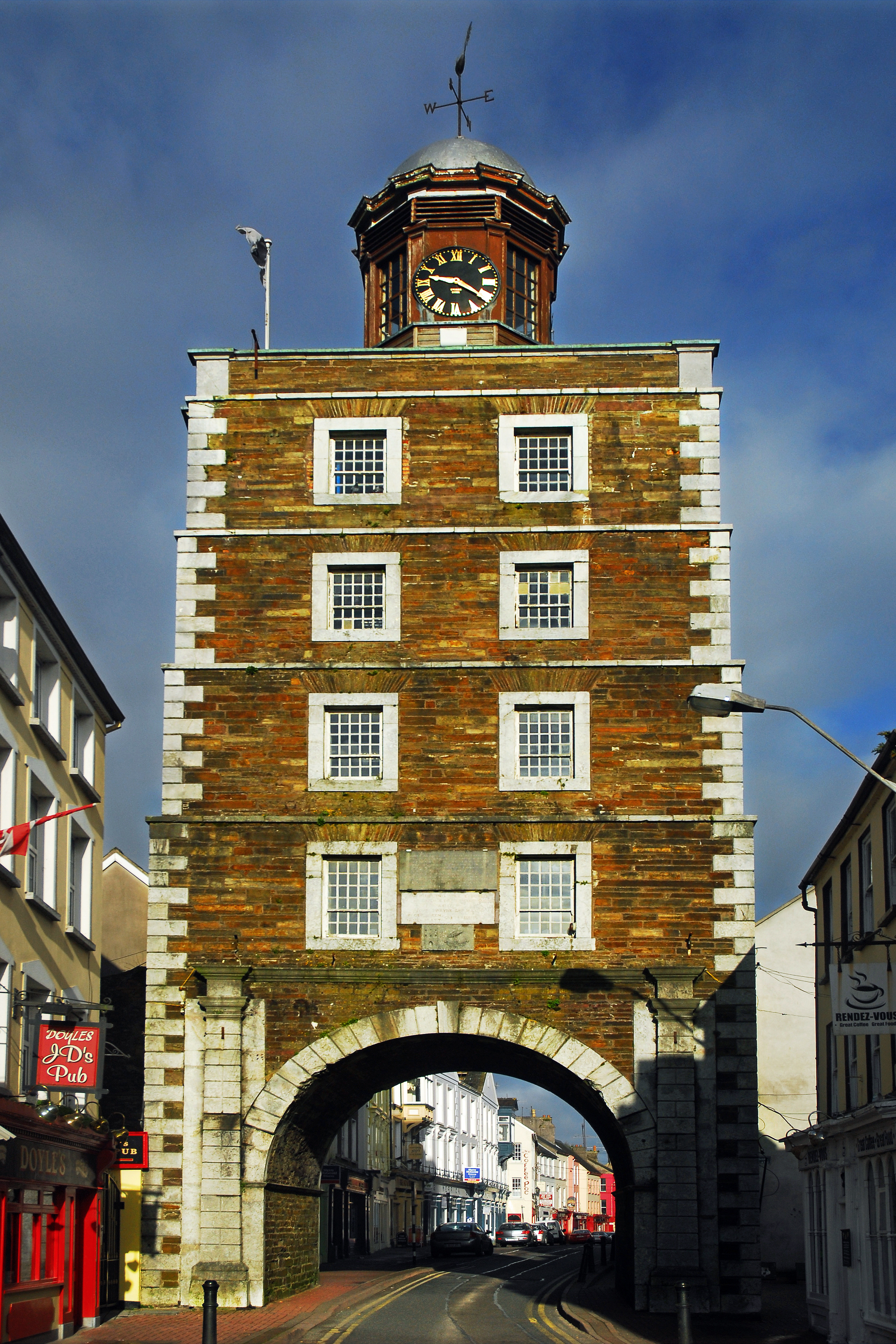
- Clock Gate Tower straddles Main Street, Youghal, on the R634

Route information
- Length: 28.8 km (17.9 mi)

Major junctions
- From: N25 at Ballyvergan, County Cork
- R633 at Ballyvergan East; R908 at Knockavery Strand, Youghal; R908 at Summerfield Cross, Youghal; Enter County Waterford: N25 at Rincrew; R627 at Main Street, Tallow; R629 at The Square, Tallow
- To: N72 at Tallowbridge, County Waterford

Location
- Country: Ireland

Highway system
- Roads in Ireland; Motorways; Primary; Secondary; Regional
← R633	→ R635

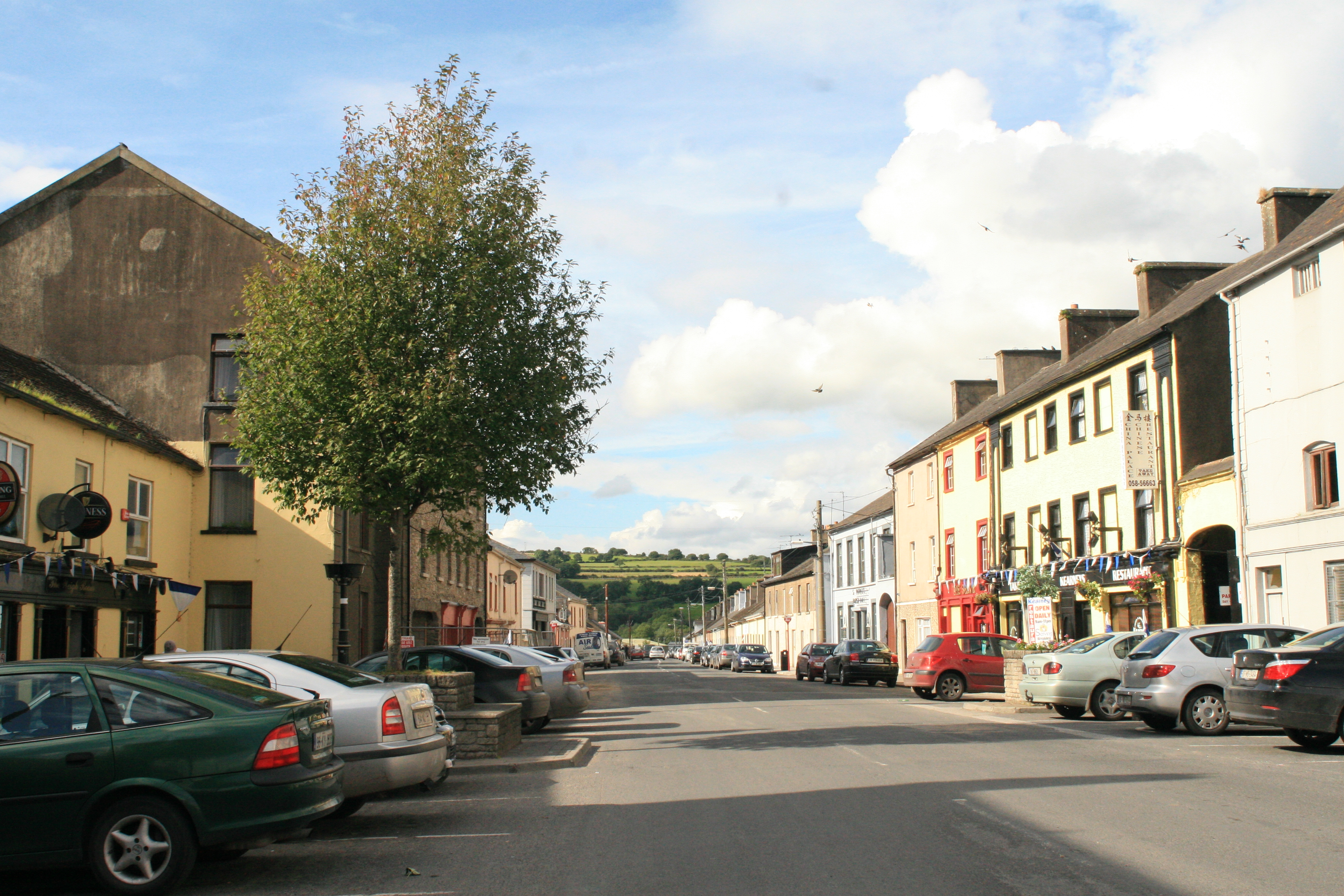
Convent Street, Tallow on the R634

The R634 road is a regional road in Ireland. It travels from the N25 road outside Youghal, County Cork, north to the N72 in County Waterford, via Youghal town centre and the village of Tallow, County Waterford. The road is 28.8 kilometres (17.9 mi) long.
