= R632 road (Ireland) =

Regional road in Ireland

R632 road
- Bóthar R632

Route information
- Length: 10.0 km (6.2 mi)

Major junctions
- From: N25 at Castlemartyr, County Cork
- R633 at Ladysbridge

- To: R629 at Shanagarry

Location
- Country: Ireland

Highway system
- Roads in Ireland; Motorways; Primary; Secondary; Regional
← R631	→ R633

The R632 road is a regional road in County Cork, Ireland. It travels from Castlemartyr to Shanagarry, via Ladysbridge. The R632 is 10.0 kilometres (6.2 mi) long.
