= Tallow, County Waterford =

Town in County Waterford, Ireland

Tallow Tulach an Iarainn (Irish)
- Town
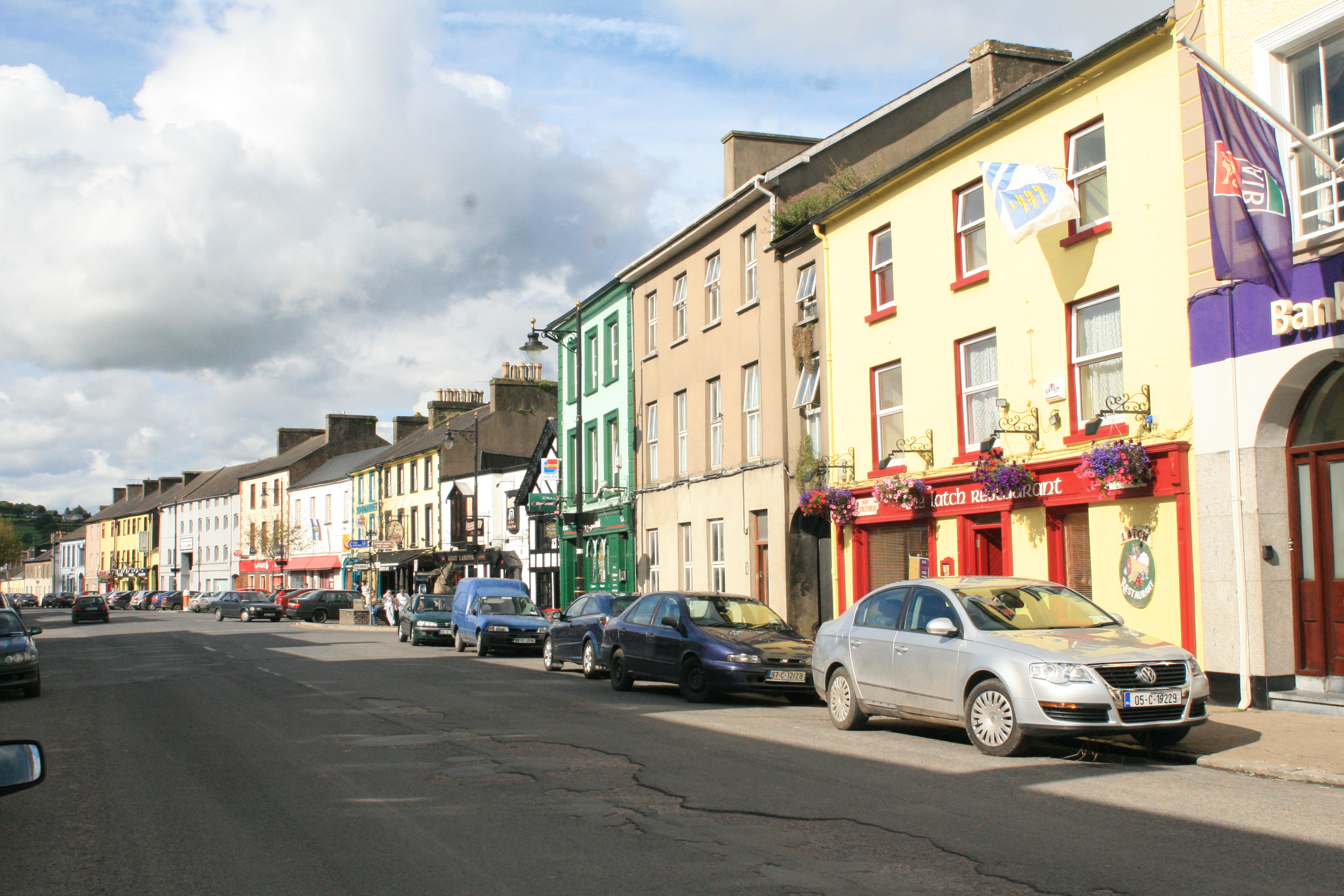
- Main Street in Tallow.
- Interactive map of Tallow
- Location in Ireland
- Coordinates: 52°5′37″N 8°0′24″W
- Country: Ireland
- Province: Munster
- County: Waterford
- Municipal District: Dungarvan–Lismore
- Town Charter: 1613

Population (2022)
  - Total: 1,022
- Time zone: UTC+0 (WET)
  - Summer (DST): UTC-1 (IST (WEST))
- Eircode routing key: P51
- Telephone area code: +353(0)58
- Irish Grid Reference: W995934
- Website: tallowwaterford.com

Tallow (/ˈtæl.oʊ/; Irish: Tulach an Iarainn, meaning 'hillock of the iron') is a town, civil parish and townland in County Waterford, Ireland. Tallow is in the province of Munster near the border between County Cork and County Waterford and situated on a small hill just south of the River Bride.

Historical population
Year	Pop.	±%
1813	2,258	—
1821	2,329	+3.1%
1831	2,998	+28.7%
1841	2,969	−1.0%
1851	1,986	−33.1%
1861	1,619	−18.5%
1871	1,332	−17.7%
1881	1,232	−7.5%
1891	1,088	−11.7%
1901	964	−11.4%
1911	849	−11.9%
1926	782	−7.9%
1936	779	−0.4%
1946	722	−7.3%
1951	716	−0.8%
1956	842	+17.6%
1961	819	−2.7%
1966	813	−0.7%
1971	883	+8.6%
1981	937	+6.1%
1986	867	−7.5%
1991	858	−1.0%
1996	802	−6.5%
2002	845	+5.4%
2006	911	+7.8%
2011	962	+5.6%
2016	946	−1.7%
2022	1,022	+8.0%

== History ==
Some records indicate that there was a church at Tallow, possibly of pre-Anglo-Norman foundation, from at least the 12th century. During the Medieval period the town was known as Tolaghrath or Tylaghrath, derived from the Irish Tulach Rátha, or 'hillock of the ringfort'. Lisfinny Castle, a 15th-century tower house constructed by the Earl of Desmond, overlooks the town.

Early records show that Tallow was a centre for iron smelting, and the town's later Irish name, Tulach an Iarainn, translates as "hill of the iron" in English. From the early 17th century, Richard Boyle, 1st Earl of Cork reportedly planted a number of Protestant English families in the Tallow area and developed the iron industry on a "large[er] scale". By 1659 the "Old Forge" area of the town had 51 inhabitants. Over seven years, Tallow produced up to 21,000 tonnes of wrought iron, valued at £378,000 (about £80 million in 2025). Alongside iron, a cutlery industry also formed. Smelting in Tallow lasted until around 1687, by which time the surrounding forests used to fuel the mills had been exhausted.

Tallow also became a centre for grain export, downriver to Youghal. Wool combing also took place locally during the 18th century. During the mid-19th century, the Great Famine hit the town and surrounding area hard, leading to a decline in population.

Before the Act of Union (Ireland) 1800, Tallow was a parliamentary borough with the Tallow constituency electing two MPs to the Irish House of Commons from 1613 until the dissolution of the Kingdom of Ireland in 1801. During the Land War in 1887, Douglas Pyne, MP for West Waterford, imprisoned himself in Lisfinny Castle after a warrant was issued for his arrest. After receiving thousands of supporters from Tallow and the surrounding area, he escaped by slipping through a police cordon.

== Government ==
Tallow is located in the Lismore local electoral area of Waterford City and County Council.

== Amenities ==
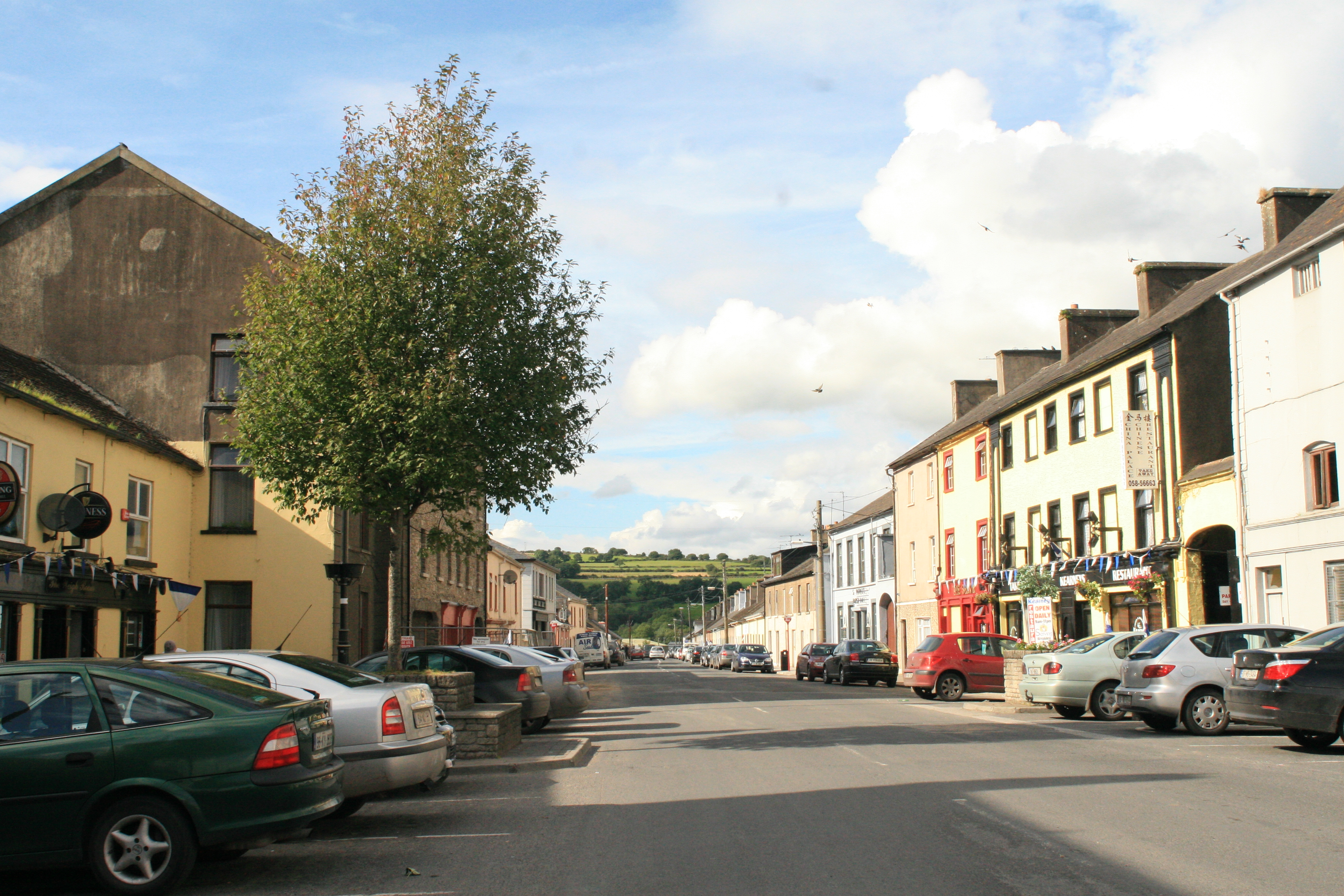
Convent Street in Tallow

Tallow has a number of public houses and restaurants, clustered on the Main Street. The town's library, which was opened as a Carnegie library in 1910, is one of several overseen by Waterford City and County Council. Other business include a pharmacy, veterinarian, dairy co-operative store, post office, credit union, hardware shop, antiques shop, supermarkets and a café.

== Religion ==
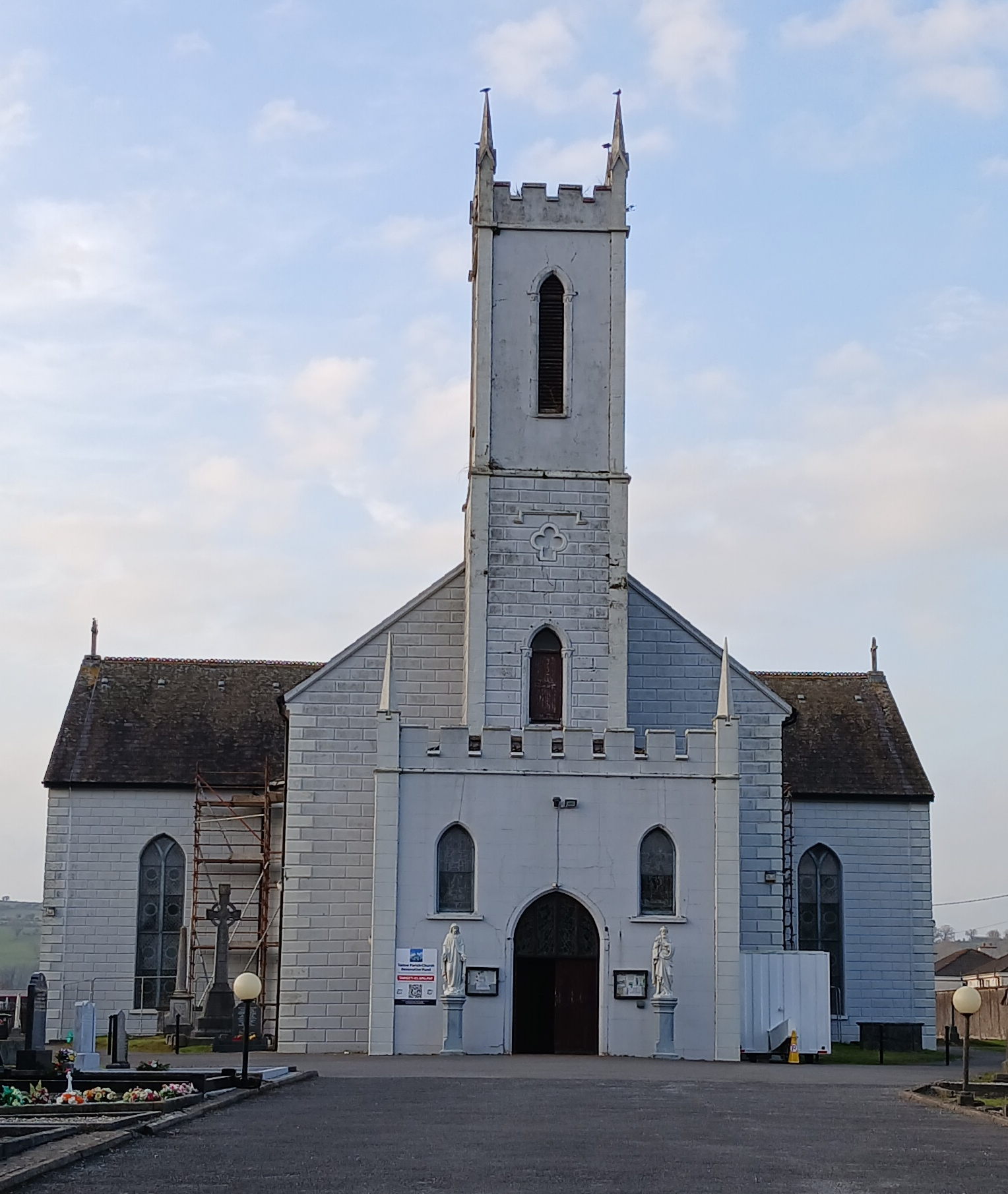
Church of the Immaculate Conception on Chapel Street

The Catholic Parish of Tallow centres on the Church of the Immaculate Conception on Chapel Street, built in 1826. It is the tallest building in the town. St Joseph's Carmelite Monastery was founded in 1836 and is located on Convent Street. It is one of six Discalced Carmelite monasteries in Ireland.

St Catherine's Church of Ireland on Mill Road, was built in 1775 but closed in the 1960s due to falling numbers of parishioners. The nearest Anglican church is St Mary's, Fountains, 7 km east in the townland of Kilanthony.

== Sports ==
Tallow GAA play at Páirc Éamonn de Paor on the outskirts of the town and field Hurling teams in County and Provincial competitions. The town also has a soccer club, Brideview United AFC, who compete in the West Waterford East Cork League. In 2026, Tallow GAA was one of three west Waterford GAA clubs, alongside Shamrocks GAA in Knockanore and Lismore GAA, to receive a €50,000 donation from American billionaire Mark Zuckerberg and his wife Priscilla Chan, who had recently acquired nearby Strancally Castle.

Fishing and horse racing are also local sports, and since 1904 the Tallow Horse Fair has been held annually at the beginning of September.

== Transport ==
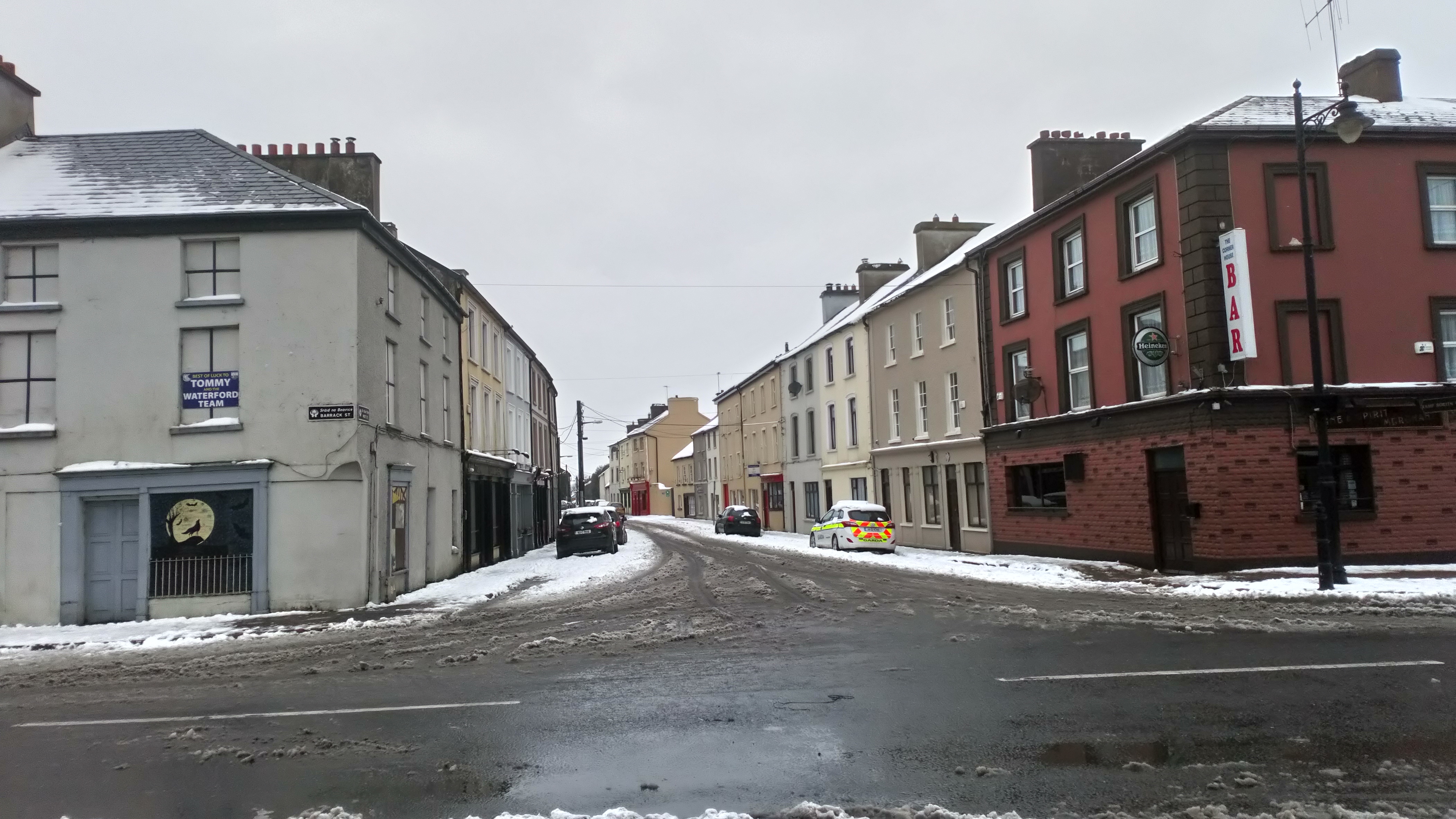
Junctions of the R627 and R634 in Tallow, following the Beast from the East in March 2018

The town lies at the junction of the R627, R628 and R634 regional roads.

Tallow Road railway station opened on 27 September 1872, located on the Waterford–Mallow railway line. It closed on 27 March 1967. It was served by the Cork to Rosslare boat train.

As of 2026, Tallow is served primarily by the 363 Local Link (formerly Déise Link) bus service. This links Tallow to Dungarvan via Lismore and Cappoquin. A number of these services go onward from Tallow towards Fermoy. The 363a service connects Tallow to Ballyduff.

Less frequent services that require pre-booking link Tallow to Youghal.

== Education ==
Scoil Mhuire, Tallow is a Catholic, mixed national (primary) school, formed in 1980 following the amalgamation of the town's older boys and girls primary schools. As of 2023, it had 149 pupils enrolled. The nearest secondary school is Blackwater Community School (BCS) in nearby Lismore.

== People ==
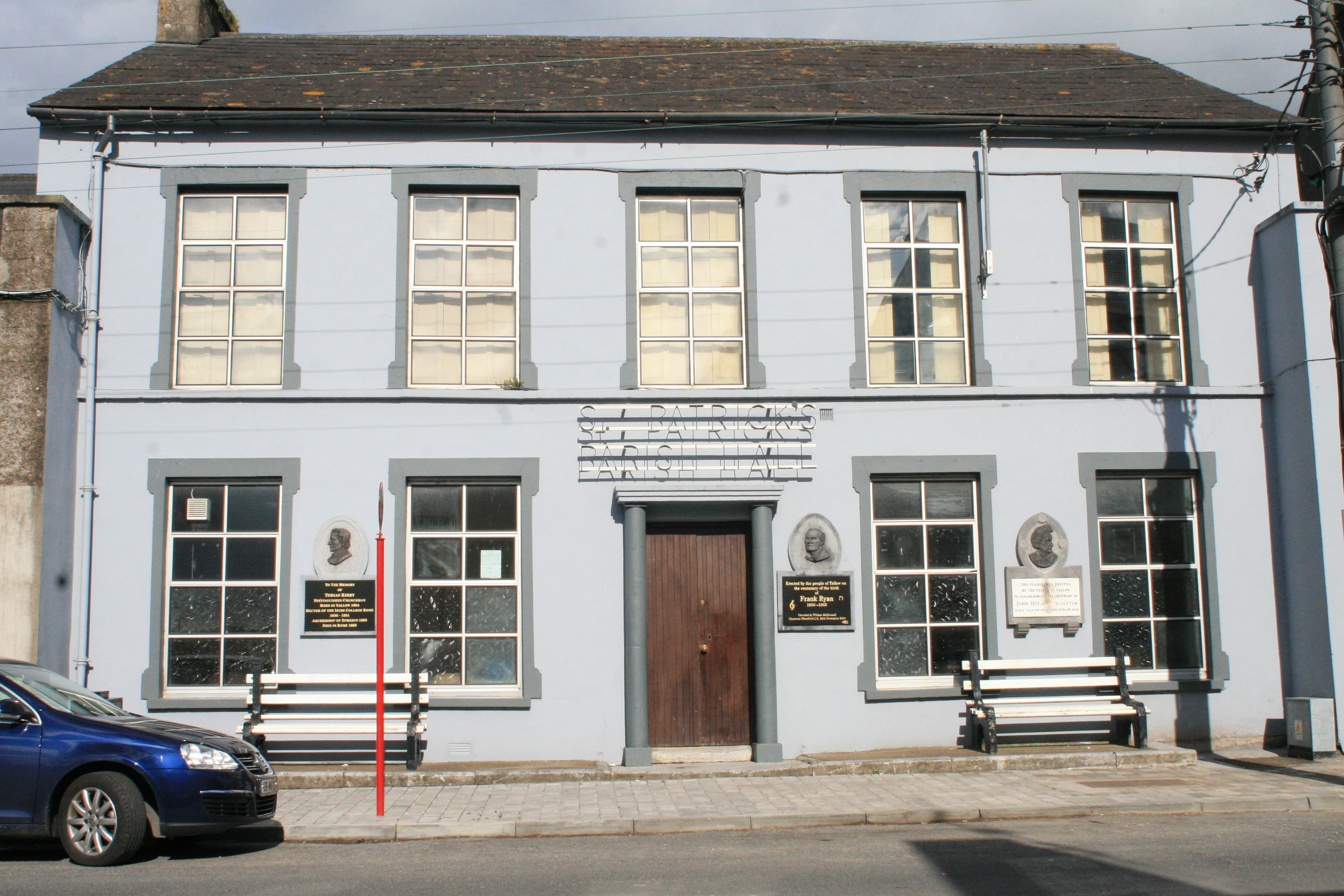
St Patrick's Parish Hall with three plaques commemorating people from Tallow

At St Patrick's Parish Hall a number of people from Tallow are commemorated:

- John Hogan (1800–1858), a sculptor who was responsible for "much of the most significant religious sculpture in Ireland" during the 19th century, was born in Tallow
- Tobias Kirby (1804–1895), rector of the Irish College Rome (1850–1891) and archbishop of Ephesus (1885), was also born in Tallow.
- Frank Ryan (1900–1965), tenor, grew up in Tallow.

Other people with ancestral links to Tallow include Academy Award-winning actor Edmond O'Brien, whose parents lived in Tallow prior to emigrating to the United States. Charlie McCarthy, father of former Republic of Ireland manager and player Mick McCarthy, is also from Tallow. Waterford inter-county hurler and school principal Ned Power (1929–2007) played for and later coached Tallow GAA. A statue to him is located at Tallowbridge. Former Senator and journalist Eoghan Harris lived in Tallow for the first five years of his life, where his father was general manager of Bride Valley Stores.

== See also ==
- List of towns and villages in Ireland
