= Dario Cecchini =

Italian butcher

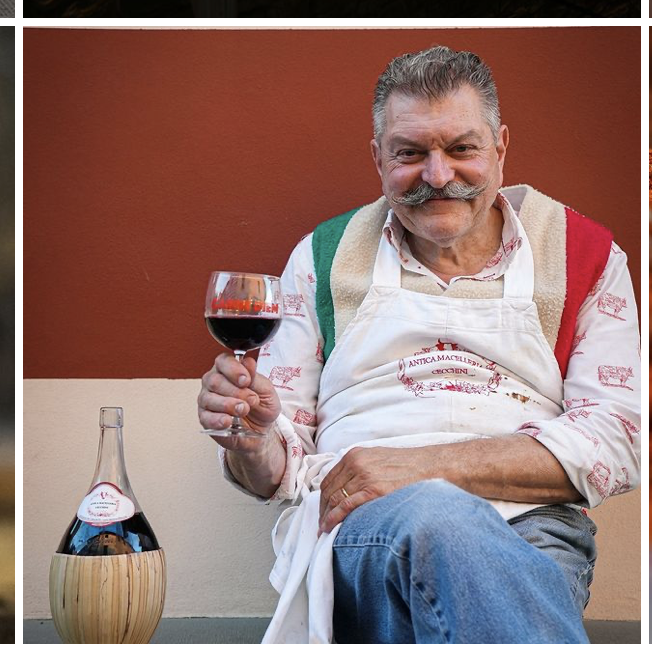
Cecchini with a glass of Chianti

Dario Cecchini (born 1955) is an eighth generation Italian butcher from Panzano in the Chianti region of Italy.

== Biography ==
Cecchini was born in 1955 in the Tuscan village of Panzano. He studied veterinary science at the university of Pisa but left halfway through his studies in 1976 to take over the family business established in 1780, Antica Macelleria Cecchini, from his dying father. Dario is an eighth-generation butcher.

Cecchini gained international renown in 2001 when, after the EU banned the sale of all beef on the bone from cows that are more than one year old, he staged a widely publicised mock funeral for Bistecca.

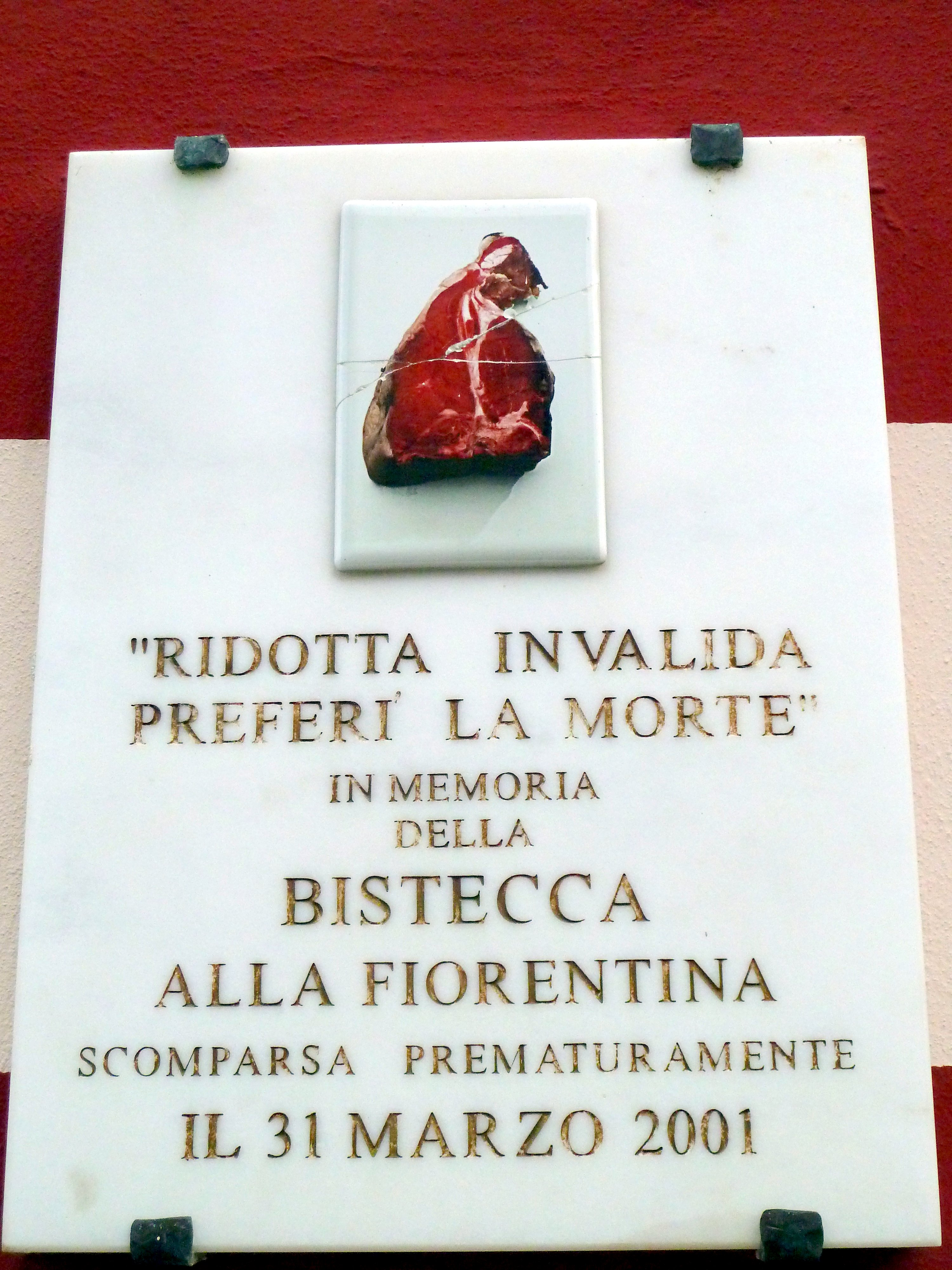
Plaque outside Antica Macelleria Cecchini commemorating the 2001 mock "funeral" for Bistecca alla Fiorentina, as a result of an EU ban.

He presented at the MAD Symposium in August 2013 in Copenhagen, to 500 chefs from around the world. He closed his presentation with a recitation of a passage from Dante Alighieri's Inferno.

In March 2014, Cecchini was featured in BBC Radio 4's The Food Programme. In the interview, Cecchini described butchery as an ancient art that involved a respect for the animal, and he likened his work to poetry.

He and his wife operate not only the historic butcher shop, but also three restaurants attached to the shop: Panzanese (grilled Panzanese steak); Solociccia (braising, boiling, grilling, generally using lesser-known cuts); and Officina della Bistecca.
