= User illusion =

Concept in philosophy of mind

In philosophy of mind, user illusion is a metaphor for a proposed description of consciousness that argues that conscious experience does not directly expose objective reality, but instead provides a simplified version of reality that allows humans to make decisions and act in their environment, akin to a computer desktop. It suggests that the subjective experience of the world is not immediate, as all sensation requires processing time; therefore, conscious experience is less a perfect reflection of what is occurring, and more a simulation produced subconsciously by the brain; it then propose that some phenomena may exist beyond human peripheries, and beyond what consciousness could create to isolate or reduce them.

The term "user illusion" was first introduced by Alan Kay, a computer scientist working on graphical user interfaces at Xerox PARC, to describe the illusion created by the user interface of a desktop computer. Tor Nørretranders explored as a metaphor for conscious experience in his book The User Illusion: Cutting Consciousness Down to Size, and the concept has been developed further by Daniel Dennett, who has also embraced the view that human consciousness is a "user-illusion".

== Etymology ==
The term "user illusion" was first used by Alan Kay, a computer scientist working on graphical user interfaces at Xerox PARC, to describe the illusion created by the user interface of a desktop computer. Kay noted that the visual metaphor of a desktop is merely a tool to create the simplified representation of the underlying complexity of the computer. This "user illusion" represents the computer as much simpler than it truly is, and, from the user's perspective, is not just a human–computer interface that allows the user to not only act and make decisions when using the computer, but, in all purposes, is the computer itself. For example, computer designers create windows and folders, objects that only exist in the interface but allow the user to interact with the underlying complex programming.

== Applications ==
=== Information processing ===
The notion that consciousness is a form of user illusion is explored by Tor Nørretranders in his 1991 book The User Illusion: Cutting Consciousness Down to Size. Nørretranders approaches the problem of consciousness through the perspective of information processing, where he treats the human brain as a computer. He suggests that most of the work is taken care of at a subconscious level: we perceive around 12 million bits of information per second, among which 10 million capacity is reserved for vision, 1 million is for touch, and the rest is distributed for other senses. Despite this vast amount of information that is processed subconsciously, conscious information processing can only work at about 60 bits/sec. Thereby, consciousness acts as a filter to prune the information that is received by the senses into something a conscious experience can handle. This would also explain why we can only perceive and thus focus on a limited amount of objects at any time and why it takes great efforts to deal with something we encounter for the first time - that is because our brain has to work hard to learn how to filter new inputs. For example, it’s difficult to learn new skills in sports. Practice is necessary for your subconscious to learn the precise movement for each limb in order to coordinate. Thus, Nørretranders postulates that when athletes report that they had too much time to think about their skills and mess up, it could be due to the fact that the thought process became slow enough that the conscious mind interfered and started to take over the control.

Benjamin Libet conducted an experiment that supports the idea of consciousness as a user illusion. This study investigated the relation between our conscious and unconscious mind. Subjects wired with measuring electrodes were asked to move a finger. A half-second before the decision is made to flex the muscle, an electrical signal is detected in the brain. Astonishingly, the decision seems to be made by unconscious neurons before the self becomes aware of its desire to act. This study suggests that consciousness is not the initiator. However, our subconscious minds process information and make decisions on what to distribute to our conscious mind before we are aware.

=== Models of others and oneself ===
Daniel Dennett suggests that although a human may not be able to understand everything that's going on in the cell phone system, we can still use our phones smoothly by simple touches and nudges. Therefore, the user illusion simplifies life such that we are able to interact with the interface with only a few simplified steps, without knowing the underlying working principles. Thus, he claims that humans experience reality as a "user-illusion", in which our conscious experience is a simplification of reality and allows us to seamlessly act in our world. Dennett claims that we benefit from this phenomenon, since "It's the brain's 'user illusion' of itself ... The brain doesn't have to understand how the brain works". In addition, in our minds, we have developed models of others as "conscious agents". When person A talks to person B, B does not have the access to A's inner thoughts; however, B is able to gain a good sense of what's going on in A's mind and at the same time, A is able to convey such good ideas as well. Dennett says, "Your consciousness is my user illusion of you and my consciousness is your user illusion of me." Meanwhile, humans have the model of oneself as well. Just as how A would approach B, by asking himself or herself questions and waiting for his or her own responses, A can get access to himself or herself as well such that we are probing our minds and getting ourselves to think and not think things as we wanted. By user illusion, we are manipulating our own brains.

=== Evolutionary fitness ===
Donald D. Hoffman explains how the user illusion may have originated from the selective pressures of Darwinism. Hoffman argues that although the classic argument is that evolutionary fitness was correlated with perceiving the truth about our environment, the fitness function need not be correlated with objective truth at all. According to Hoffman and colleague Chetan Prakash, "According to evolution by natural selection, an organism that sees reality as it is will never be more fit than an organism of equal complexity that sees none of reality but is just tuned to fitness. Never." Hoffman explains that evolution has molded us to have perceptions and conscious experiences that allow us to survive and reproduce. Much like the computer desktop, our perception of reality is merely a tuned simplification that guides adaptive behavior, a user illusion.

== Criticism ==
=== Introspection ===
Critics of user illusion argue that humans are able to access the content of their brain’s representations by introspection and analysis of inner speech. These critics point out that more often humans know what is meant, although they may be wrong about what they said or how they delivered what they said. Furthermore, critics argue that inner speech episodes permit access to the content of some of our brain states, which thereby allows us to know what our brain states represent by introspection. This argument disputes the claim that consciousness is merely a simplified representation of the world in which we cannot access the full information of reality since what you introspect is what there is.

=== Social behavior ===
The user illusion proposes that consciousness is an evolutionary tool utilized to enhance social behavior and cooperation. Social insects provide an argument against this conclusion as these insects experience social cooperation and complex groupthink. Critics argue that the existence of social insects with extremely small brains falsifies the notion that social behavior requires consciousness, citing that insects have too small brains to be conscious and yet there are observed behaviors among them that for all functional intents and purposes match those of complex social cooperation and manipulation (including hierarchies where each individual has its place among paper wasps and Jack Jumper ants and honey bees sneaking when they lay eggs). These critics also argue that since social behavior in insects and other extremely small-brained animals have evolved multiple times independently, there is no evolutionary difficulty in simple reaction sociality to impose selection pressure for the more nutrient-consuming path of consciousness for sociality. These critics do point out that other evolutionary paths to consciousness are possible, such as critical evaluation that enhances plasticity by criticizing fallible notions, while pointing out that such a critical consciousness would be quite different from the justificatory type proposed by Nørretranders, differences including that a critical consciousness would make individuals more capable of changing their minds instead of justifying and persuading.

=== Free will ===
Free will can be defined philosophically as the ability of an individual to determine the course of their actions uninhibited by any other force. If consciousness does not exist then it can be proposed that humans have little action over their decisions and biology is the driving force behind human decision making. Daniel Dennett proposes that human experiences with conscious free will are human biological mechanisms creating a user representation. Many philosophers believe however that, while free will and consciousness are separate entities, free will may build upon the idea of consciousness. If consciousness is just the data in the human mind creating a user illusion, then this supports the theory that free will may not exist.

== See also ==
- Bicameral mentality
- Hallucination (artificial intelligence)
- Illusionism (philosophy of mind)
