= Ballymaloe Cookery School =

Business in Shanagarry, County Cork, Ireland

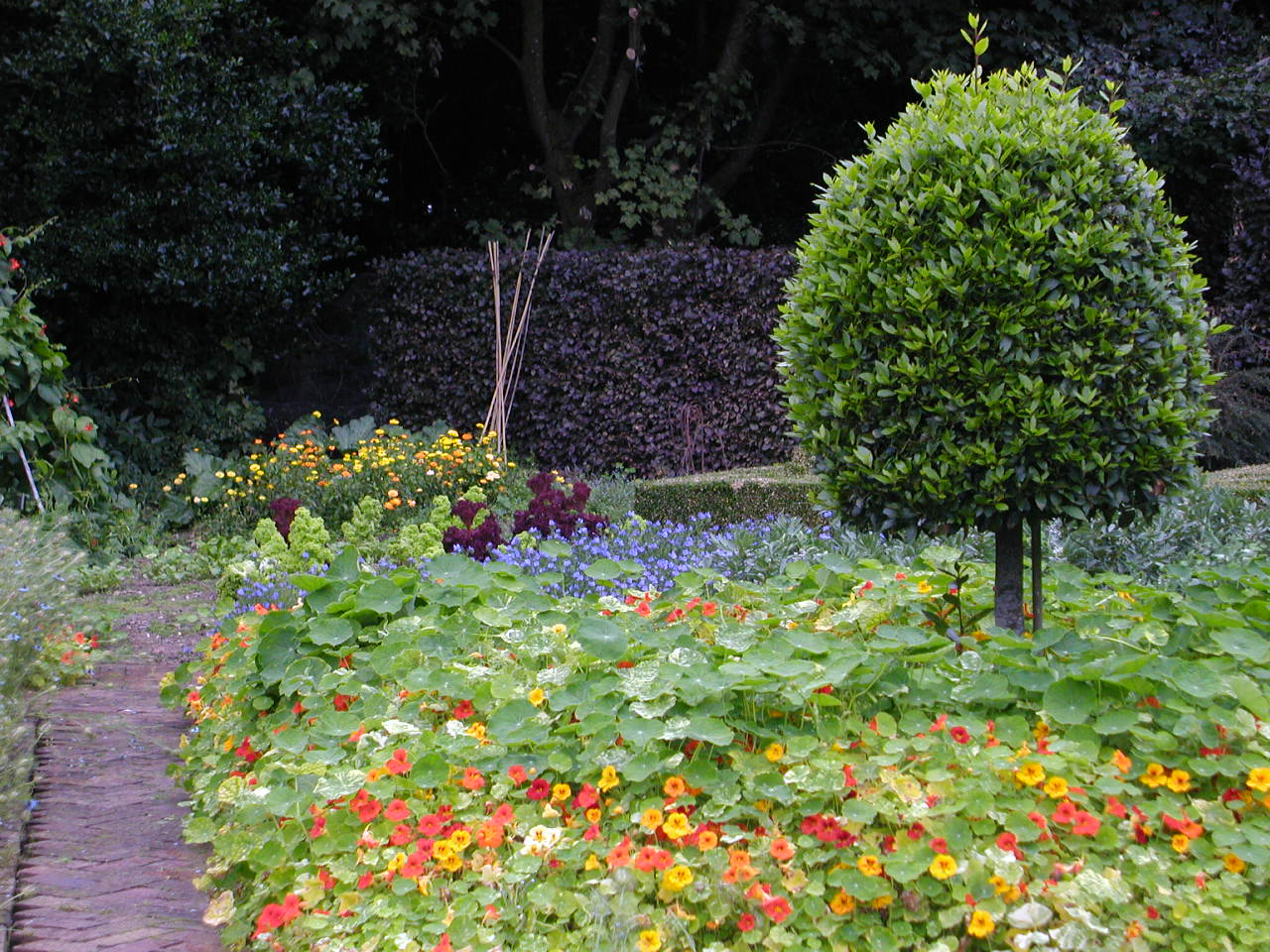
- Kitchen garden at Ballymaloe, County Cork
- Established: 1983; 43 years ago
- Focus: Cookery school
- Owner: Allen family
- Location: Shanagarry, County Cork, Ireland
- Coordinates: 51.8596°N 8.0320°W
- Interactive map of Ballymaloe Cookery School
- Website: www.ballymaloecookeryschool.ie

The Ballymaloe Cookery School (/ˌbæliməˈluː/ BAL-ee-mə-LOO) is a privately run cookery school in Shanagarry, County Cork, Ireland, that was opened in 1983. It is run by Darina Allen, a celebrity chef, cookery book author and pioneer of the slow food movement in Ireland. The school is located within the grounds of an organic farm.

== History ==
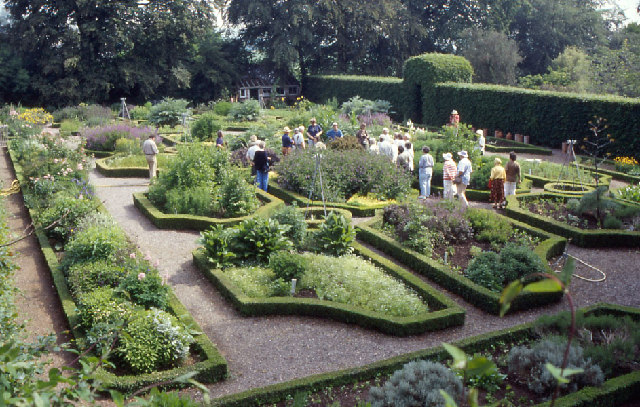
The modern, formal herb garden at Ballymaloe Cookery School

Myrtle Allen and her husband Ivan bought Ballymaloe House in 1948, and opened it as a restaurant in 1964. In 1968, Darina O'Connell joined them and taught and cooked for several years. In 1975, Myrtle Allen became the first Irish woman to receive a Michelin Star, which she held for five years.

Darina married the Allen's son Tim, and (together with her brother Rory O'Connell) started the Ballymaloe Cooking School in nearby Kinoith in 1983. Ballymaloe Cookery School is located approximately 4 km from Ballymaloe House.

Celebrity chef Rachel Allen also has a connection to Ballymaloe. She graduated from the school and is married to Isaac Allen, the son of Darina Allen.

As of 2023, the school was majority owned by Darina Allen.

== Controversy ==
=== Tim Allen conviction ===
Tim Allen, husband of Darina, was convicted of possessing pornographic images of children in 2003. There were almost 1000 images, some of children as young as five in sexual poses. The images were recovered from his home computer as well as computers at the school. The presiding judge substituted a nine-month suspended sentence for a 240-hour community service order and his name was placed upon the sex offenders register. This substitution followed an agreement by Allen to contribute €40,000 to charity. Some people phoned Ballymaloe to say they would never dine there again.

In January 2003, the Allen family announced that Tim Allen would cease all connections with Ballymaloe Cookery School, Ballymaloe House Hotel and all related businesses. The family also stated their abhorrence of any material containing child abuse and expressed regret at anyone who had been hurt by it. As of 2025, however, Tim Allen was still reported to be an active instructor at Ballymaloe Cookery School.

The grounds of Ballymaloe House are home to a preschool, ECO Preschool.

=== Joshua Allen convictions ===
Joshua Allen, eldest son of Rachel Allen, was found to be in possession of over €22,000 worth of cannabis at the cooking school in August 2018. Customs officers intercepted a package containing cannabis on 27 August 2018. The package was postmarked from the US and addressed to Joshua Allen at the cookery school. Gardaí organised a controlled delivery of the package to the cookery school on 30 August 2018, and the teenager was arrested after receiving and opening the package. He was jailed after pleading guilty to possession of controlled substances. He was released early from Cork Prison in May 2020 and within five weeks was arrested for possession of €280 worth of cocaine and sentenced to two months in prison (which could result in the suspended portion of the 15 month cannabis conviction being activated).

=== COVID-19 lockdown ===
In February 2021, the cookery school was criticised after it was revealed that an in-person cookery course had been held during Level 5 lockdown – in apparent conflict with the banning of organised gatherings and closure of restaurants and training events. An Garda Síochána announced that they had visited the school in February. Darina Allen defended the school, saying the students in question had arrived in Ireland by late December and the lockdown had been announced on 30 December, starting the next day. The course began after students self-isolated for 14 days, and was modified after the lockdown was extended in late January.
