= R627 road (Ireland) =

Road in Ireland

R627 road
- Bóthar R627
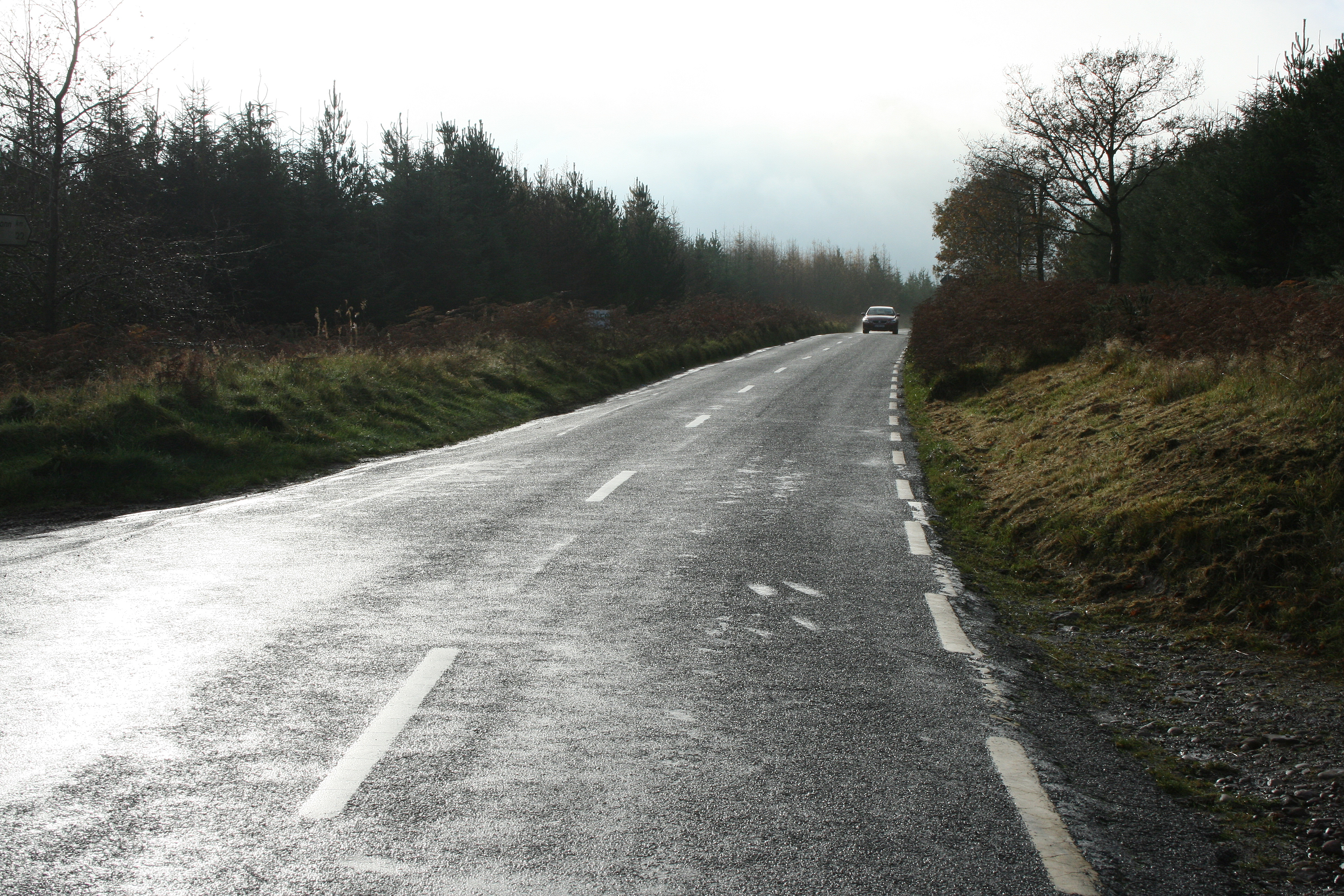
- Near the Cork–Waterford border

Route information
- Length: 27.0 km (16.8 mi)

Major junctions
- From: R907 at Main Street, Midleton, County Cork

- To: R634 at Main Street, Tallow, County Waterford

Location
- Country: Ireland

Highway system
- Roads in Ireland; Motorways; Primary; Secondary; Regional
← R626	→ R628

The R627 is a regional road between Midleton in County Cork and Tallow, County Waterford in Ireland. The route begins in the centre of Midleton and runs northeast for 27 km (17 mi) to Tallow. Most of the route is in County Cork.

== See also ==
- Roads in Ireland
