= Church of the Immaculate Conception, Tallow =

Church of the Immaculate Conception
- Church of the Immaculate Conception, Tallow
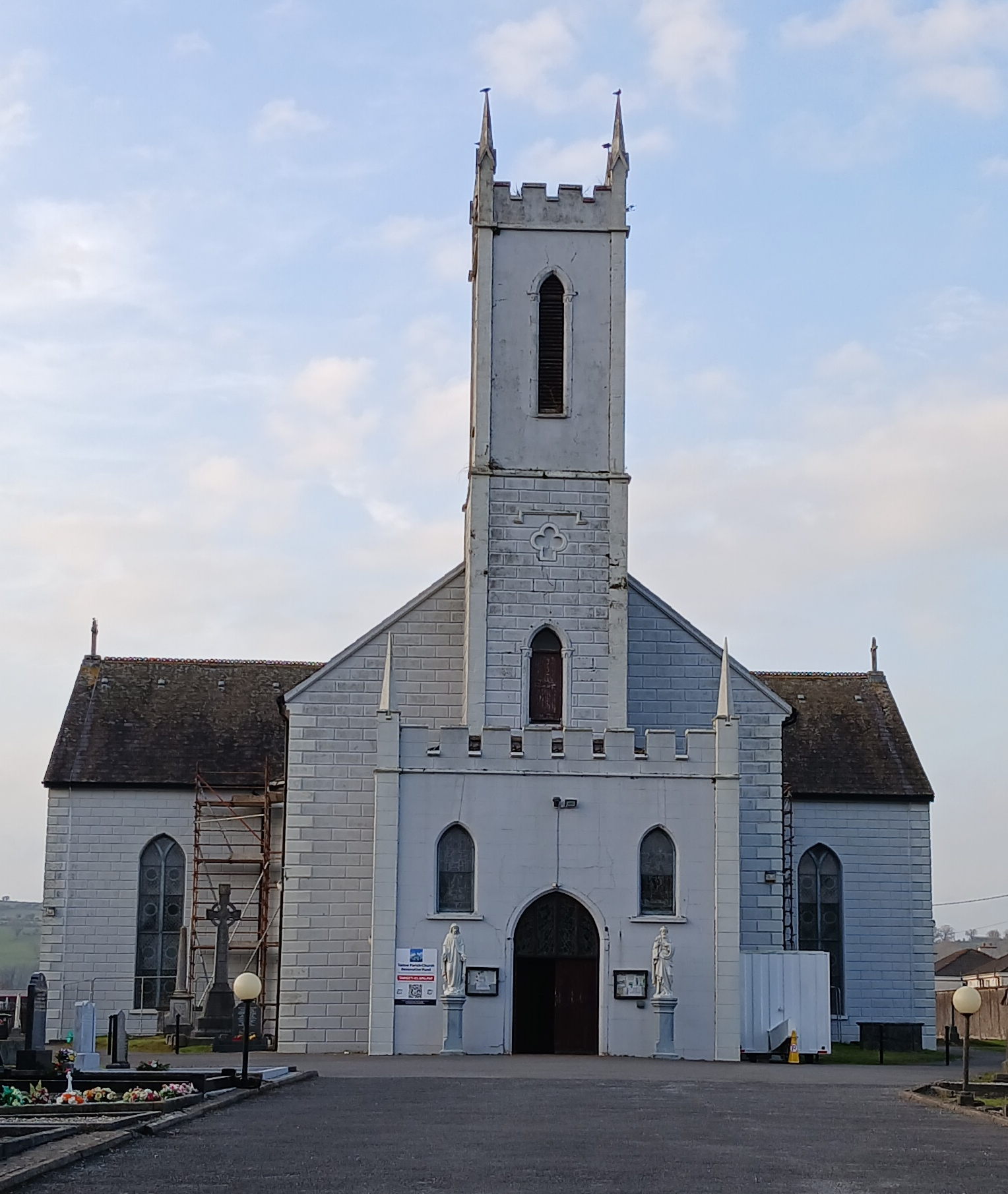
- View of the Church of the Immaculate Conception from Chapel Street, 2025
- Church of the Immaculate Conception
- 52°5′39.23″N 8°0′15.3″W
- Location: Chapel Street, Tallow
- Country: Ireland
- Denomination: Catholic Church
- Sui iuris church: Latin Church
- Tradition: Roman Rite

History
- Status: Church
- Dedication: Immaculate Conception

Architecture
- Functional status: Active
- Style: Gothic Revival
- Completed: 1826

Administration
- Diocese: Waterford and Lismore
- Parish: Tallow

Clergy
- Bishop: Alphonsus Cullinan
- Priest: Gerard McNamara

The Church of the Immaculate Conception, Tallow is a Catholic church in the parish of Tallow, County Waterford. It is listed in the Record of Protected Structures maintained by Waterford City and County Council. Its grounds include a large cemetery. It was built on the site of an earlier church in 1826, with its construction being led by Fr. Denis O'Donnell, who was parish priest in Tallow from 1812 until his death in 1830. He celebrated the first mass held in the new church on 24 November 1827. In 1868 a bell tower and front porch was added. A spire with a cross at its summit initially adorned the tower, however this was removed some time after 1930. Ahead of the church's' bicentenary, in 2024 a major renovation project was launched to secure the integrity of the building. Phase 1 of the project, costing €133,000, was finished in early 2025 and involved the restoration of the church's north face, addressing water ingress which had caused damage to the interior's Italian-painted frescoes. Phase 2 of the project will involve repairs to the bell tower. It is estimated that the total cost of the project will be €1.4 million over five years.

== Parish priests ==
- Denis O'Donnell (1812‒1830)
- Eugene Condon (1830‒1855)
- Edward O'Donnell (1855‒1858)
- P. Byrne (1858‒1866)
- James Prendergast (1866‒1902)
- William Meagher (1902‒1924)
- Michael Walsh
- Michael Farrell (‒2008)
- Gerard McNamara (2008‒present)

== Gallery ==
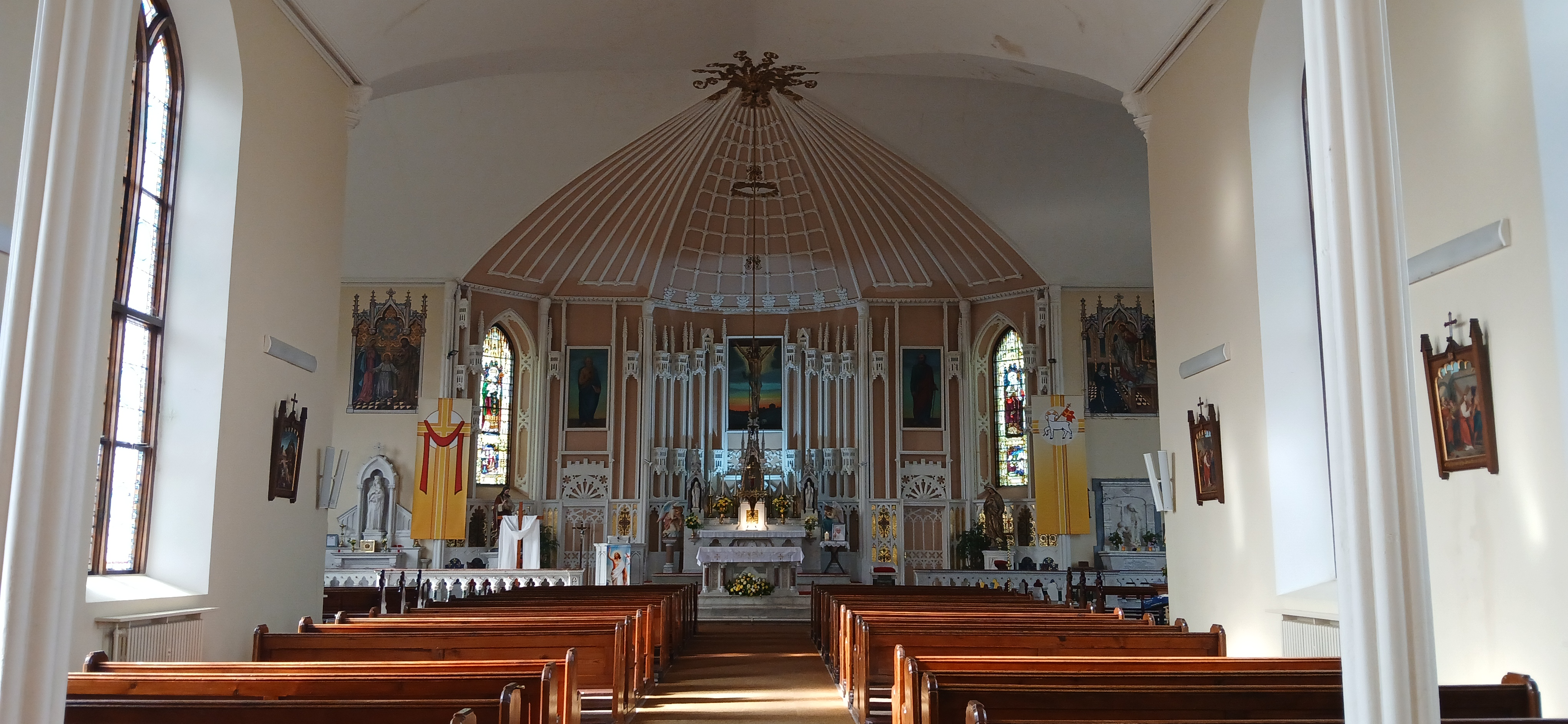
Interior view of the Church of the Immaculate Conception

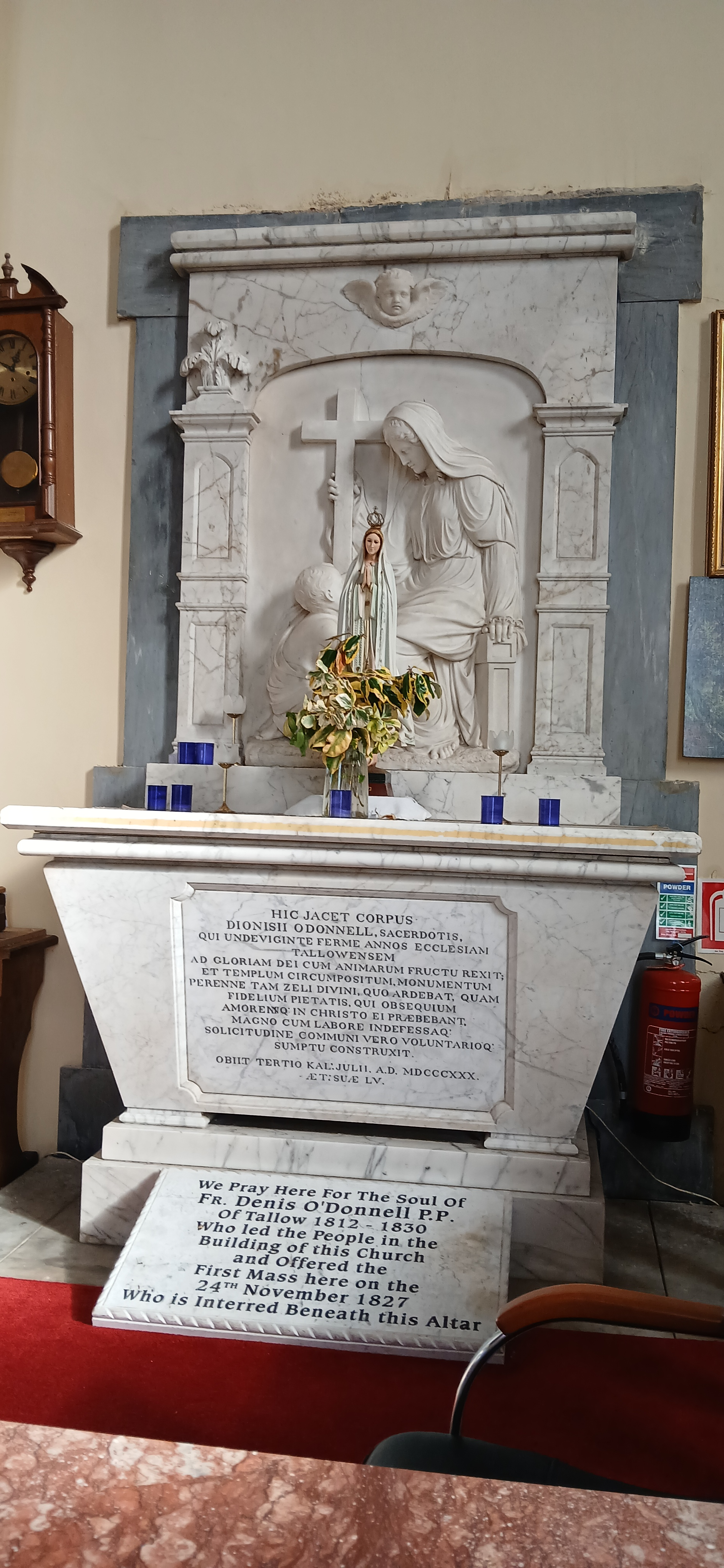
Side-altar by John Edward Carew dedicated to Fr. Denis O'Donnell
