= Ballymaloe House =

Country house with hotel and restaurant in County Cork, Ireland

Coordinates: 51°51′53.22″N 8°4′36.4″W

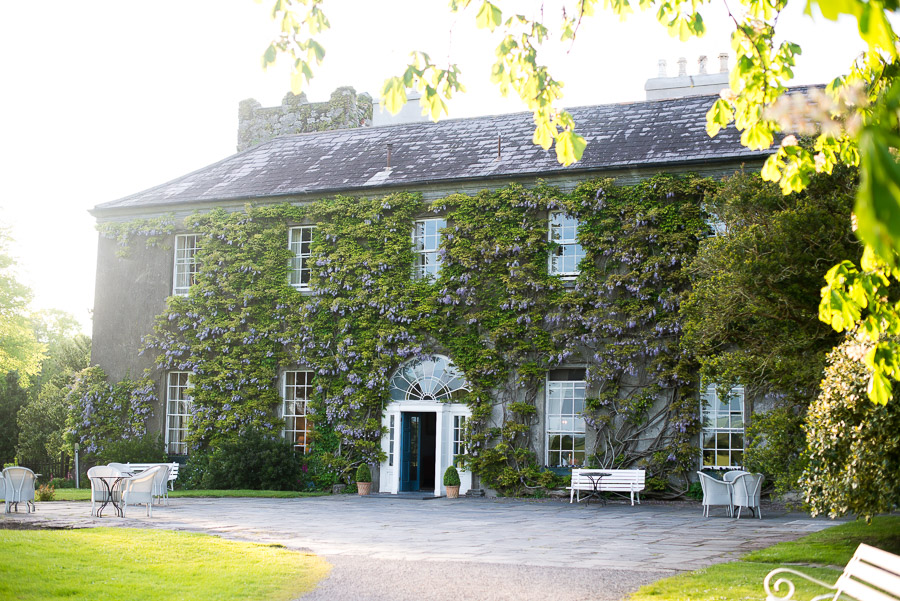
- Interactive map of Ballymaloe House

Restaurant information
- Established: 1964; 62 years ago
- Head chef: Dervilla O'Flynn
- Food type: European
- Rating: Michelin Guide (1975–80); Egon Ronay Guide (1975–81, 1983–84, 1987–88)
- Location: Shanagarry, Midleton, County Cork, Ireland
- Website: www.ballymaloe.ie

Ballymaloe House (/ˌbæliməˈluː/ BAL-ee-mə-LOO; Irish: Baile Uí Mhaolmhuaidh, lit. 'Molloy House') is a country house with a hotel and dining facilities, located in Shanagarry in County Cork, Ireland. Traces of a 15th-century castle remain within its fabric.

The Yeats Room of Ballymaloe is a restaurant, It is a fine dining facility that was awarded one Michelin star for each year in the period 1975–1980. The Michelin Guide awarded the restaurant the "Red M", indicating 'good food at a reasonable price', in the period 1981–1994. The Egon Ronay Guide awarded the restaurant one star in the periods 1975–1981, 1983–1984 and 1987–1988. The kitchen style of Ballymaloe House is Modern Irish.

In 1964 the Allen family, who had purchased the Ballymaloe estate, converted the old dining room into a restaurant. They named the restaurant The Yeats Room. In 1967 the first few rooms were converted into hotel rooms, to accommodate guests who liked to stay. Later still the Ballymaloe Cookery School was established nearby.

== History of the house ==
The oldest parts in the present Ballymaloe House can be traced back to an Anglo-Norman castle built on this site around 1450. The castle was held by members of the Desmond FitzGerald families, of Cloyne, particularly Sir John FitzEdmund FitzGerald.

After many demolition works and rebuilding, most of the present building was completed between 1780 and 1820. In 1990 and 2000 limited works were done on the building.

== History of the business ==
In the time Ballymaloe House was awarded the Michelin star, Myrtle Allen was the head chef. As of 2024, Dervilla O'Flynn was the head chef. O'Flynn is married to Myrtle Allen's grandson, Sacha Whelan.

== See also ==
- List of Michelin starred restaurants in Ireland
- Penn Castle
