= R633 road (Ireland) =

Road in Ireland

Coordinates: 51.907149°N 7.939488°W

R633 road
- Bóthar R633

Route information
- Length: 14.4 km (8.9 mi)

Major junctions
- From: R632 Ladysbridge
- To: R634 Youghal (Upper Strand)

Location
- Country: Ireland

Highway system
- Roads in Ireland; Motorways; Primary; Secondary; Regional

The R633 road is a regional road in Ireland, located in County Cork.
