= Darina Allen =

Irish chef

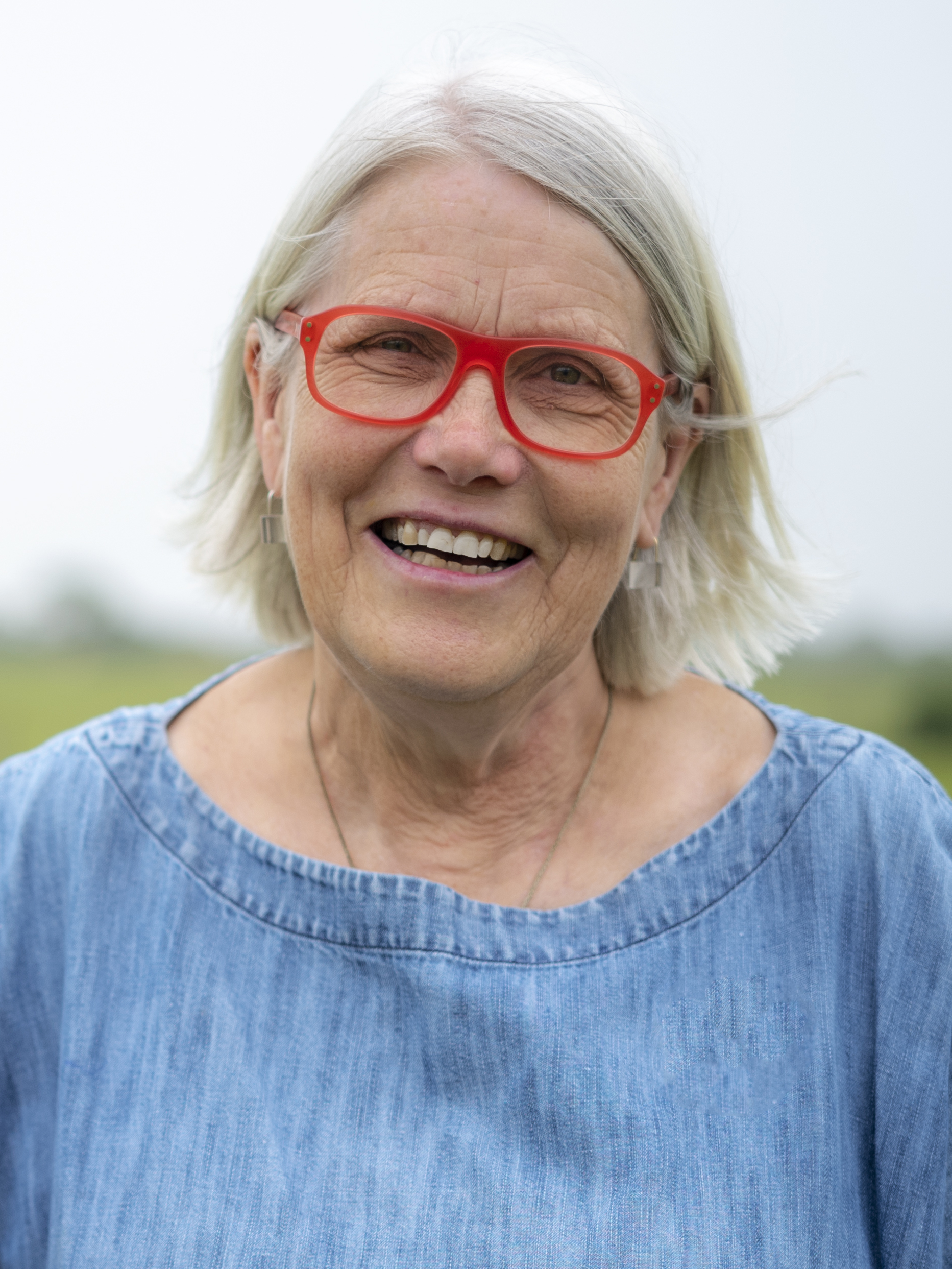
- Allen in 2018
- Born: Mary Darina O'Connell; 30 July 1948 (age 78); Cullohill, County Laois, Ireland
- Education: Dublin Institute of Technology
- Occupations: Chef; Television personality; Author
- Known for: Leading the Slow Food movement in Ireland
- Spouse: Tim Allen (m. 1970)
- Children: 4
- Relatives: Myrtle Allen (Mother-in-law); Rachel Allen (Daughter-in-law)
- Website: Official website

Darina Hilda Allen (née O'Connell; born 30 July 1948) is an Irish chef, food writer, TV personality and founder of Ballymaloe Cookery School.

== Biography ==
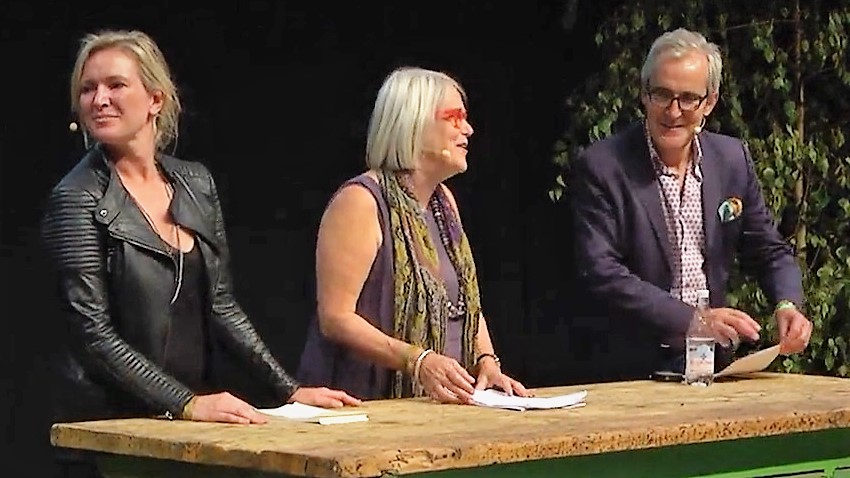
From left: Daughter-in-law Rachel Allen, Darina Allen, brother Rory O'Connell, all chefs, speak at MAD Symposium about "Passing on Skills", in 2014

Darina Allen was born in Cullohill, County Laois, the eldest of nine children. The renowned chef Rory O'Connell is her brother. A graduate in hotel management of the Dublin Institute of Technology, she is the author of several successful books on the topic of Irish cuisine. She is a leader of the Slow Food movement in Ireland and instrumental in establishing a network of farmers' markets in the County Cork area. In the 1960s she was sous-chef at Ballymaloe House and started giving courses in cooking. Later she moved the cookery classes to Kinoith under the name of Ballymaloe Cookery School. She married Tim Allen, son of Myrtle Allen and Ivan Allen, and now lives on her organic farm, Kinoith, in Shanagarry. Allen has been voted cooking teacher of the year by the International Association of Culinary Professionals. She is owner of Ballymaloe Cookery School in Shanagarry, County Cork. The school is situated on an organically run farm.

Allen was a founder of some of the first Farmers' Markets in Ireland and continues to be involved in helping set up new markets.. She is currently chair of the Midleton Farmers' Market.

Darina Allen's husband, Tim Allen set up the Ballymaloe Cookery School with Darina. In January 2003 he pleaded guilty to possessing 977 pornographic images of children. He was caught as part of the Gardaí's Operation Amethyst, which tracked internet users who paid for child pornography with credit cards. Tim Allen was sentenced to community service and placed on the sex offenders register after offering to pay €40,000 to a children's charity in India. Following Allen's conviction, the Ballymaloe cookery school announced that he would no longer be involved in the business. However, he remains involved.

== Memberships ==
Member of Taste Council of Irish Food Board, Chair of Artisan Food Forum of Food Safety Authority of Ireland, Food Safety Consultative Council of Ireland, Trustee of Irish Organic Centre, Patron of Irish Seedsavers.

Member of Eurotoques (European Association of Chefs), IWF (International Women's Federation), Network Ireland, Guild of Foodwriters in UK and Ireland, International SLOW Movement, Bread Bakers Guild of America, IACP (International Association of Culinary Professionals – Darina Allen is a Certified Culinary Professional and Teacher and the school is accredited by IACP).

Councillor for Ireland in Slow Food Movement and President of East Cork Convivium of Slow Food.

== Awards and honours ==
- 2013 Irish Book Awards (Cookbook of the Year) for 30 Years of Ballymaloe
- 2005 Cooking Teacher of the Year Award from IACP
- 2003 Honorary Degree from University of Ulster
- 2001 Veuve Clicquot Business Woman of the Year
- 2000 Waterford Wedgwood Hospitality Award
- 1996 Langhe Ceretto Prize
- 1993 Laois Person of the Year
- 1992 Gilbeys Gold Medal for Catering Excellence jointly with Myrtle Allen
- Fellow of Irish Hotel and Catering Institute

== Bibliography ==
She has written a number of cookery books including:

- Simply Delicious
- Simply Delicious Christmas
- Simply Delicious in France and Italy
- Simply Delicious Fish
- Simply Delicious Versatile Vegetables
- Simply Delicious Meals in Minutes
- A Year at Ballymaloe Cookery School
- Forgotten Skills of Cooking
- Irish Traditional Cooking. Gill & Macmillan (Britain: Kyle Cathie)
