= Tor Nørretranders =

Danish writer

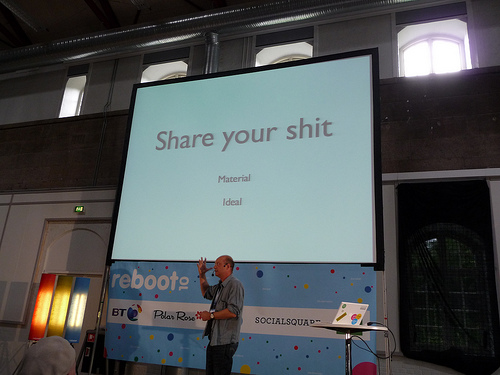
Tor Nørretranders speaking at Reboot 10 in Copenhagen

Tor Nørretranders (born 20 June 1955) is a Danish author of popular science. He was born in Copenhagen, Denmark. His books and lectures have primarily been focused on popular science and its role in society, often with Nørretranders' own advice about how society should integrate new findings in popular science. He introduced the notion of exformation in his book The User Illusion.

== Biography ==
Tor Nørretranders' mother is Yvonne Levy (1920–) and his father was Bjarne Nørretranders (1922–1986). Tor Nørretranders graduated at "Det frie gymnasium" in 1973. He earned a cand.techn.soc-degree from Roskilde University (Roskilde) in 1982, specializing in environment planning and its scientific theoretic basis. He lives in Samsø, northwest of Copenhagen, with his wife Rikke Ulk and three children.

=== Other academic accomplishments ===
- The Technical University of Denmark from 1982 to 1983
- The Danish Royal Academy of Art 1990–1991
- Adjunct Professor of the philosophy of science at Copenhagen Business School since 2003.

== The User Illusion ==
His best-known book, the international bestseller The User Illusion, argued that, "We experience not the raw sensory data but a simulation of them," as Nørretranders wrote. The title comes from the term "user illusion" coined by Alan Kay to describe the user interface of a desktop computer. The user is presented with an illusion—folders, files, tabs, and so on—of what the computer actually does. Nørretranders argued that the brain presents our conscious selves with a vastly simplified version of reality. To support his argument, Nørretranders references the work of Benjamin Libet, Julian Jaynes, and other researchers of consciousness.

== Journalism background ==
- Information (Danish Paper) 1975–1982
- Weekendavisen (Danish Paper) 1983–1985
- Børsens Nyhedsmagasin (Danish Paper) 1985–1986
- Danmarks Radio TV-K (Danish TV-station) 1986–1988
- Chaos 1988–1990 (company producing science journalism and television)
- Has received 'Dansk Forfatterforenings Faglitterære Pris 1985' (The Danish Society of Authors' Non-Fiction Prize 1985) and 'Publicistprisen 1988' (The Publicist Prize 1988)

== Bibliography ==
- Grønt lys (2008), Verve Books
- Glæd dig (2007), TV2 Forlag
- Børnespørgehjørne (2007), Thaning & Appel
- Civilisation 2.0 (2007), ISBN 87-413-6534-8, Thaning & Appel
- The Generous Man (2005), ISBN 1-56025-728-8 (English edition of Det generøse menneske)
- Einstein, Einstein (2005), Politikens Forlag (Biography on Albert Einstein)
- Menneskeføde (2005), Tiderne skifter
- At tro på at tro (2003), Anis
- Det generøse menneske. En naturhistorie om at umage giver mage. (2002), People'sPress
- Frem i tiden (1999), Tiderne Skifter
- The User Illusion (1998), ISBN 0-670-87579-1 (English edition of Mærk verden)
- Stedet som ikke er (1997), Aschehoug
- Person på en planet (1995), Aschehoug
- Verden vokser (1994), Aschehoug
- Mærk verden (1991), Gyldendal
- Dansk dynamit (1990), Forskningspolitisk Råd
- Den blå himmel (1987), Munksgaard
- Videnskabsvurdering (1987), Gyldendal
- Naturvidenskab og ikke-viden (1987), Kimære
- Det udelelige (1985), Gyldendal
- Kosmos eller kaos (1984), Tiderne Skifter
- Kræftens frie spil (1980), Informations Forlag
- Om kapitalistisk naturvidenskab (1976), Modtryk
