= Ballinacurra, County Cork =

Village in County Cork, Ireland

Ballinacurra Baile na Cora
- Village
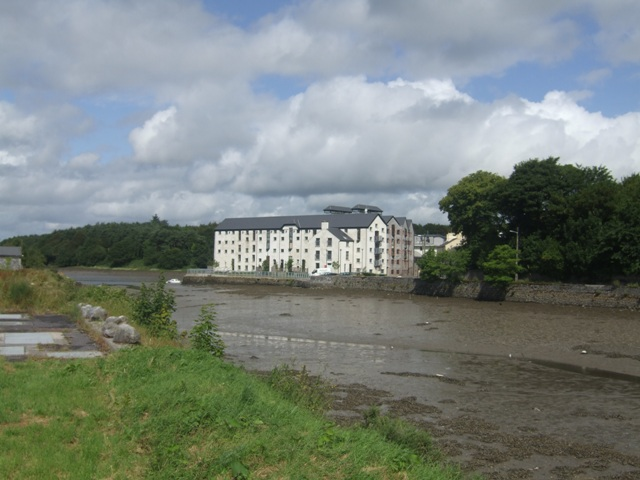
- Converted warehouse buildings at Ballinacurra

- Location in Ireland
- Coordinates: 51°54′N 8°10′W
- Country: Ireland
- Province: Munster
- County: County Cork
- Dáil Éireann: Cork East
- EU Parliament: South
- Time zone: UTC+0 (WET)
  - Summer (DST): UTC-1 (IST (WEST))

Ballinacurra (Irish: Baile na Cora, meaning 'town of the weir') is a small harbour village on the outskirts of Midleton, County Cork. It is about 18 km south east of Cork city.

The village lies at the confluence of the Owenacurra River and the east channel of Cork Harbour. It served as the port for the town of Midleton, which is less than 2 km north of Ballinacurra, for centuries and became a loading and unloading point for coal, timber, iron and slate and later flax for the linen industry.

The port of Ballinacurra closed in 1962 as it was deemed too expensive to dredge the growing levels of silt and mud at the entrance to the small harbour. It is now used mainly for small leisure boats.

The man who is believed to have discovered Antarctica in 1820, Edward Bransfield, was born and raised in Ballinacurra.

== See also ==
- East Ferry, County Cork
