= Shanagarry =

Village in County Cork, Ireland

Shanagarry Irish: An Seangharraí
- Village
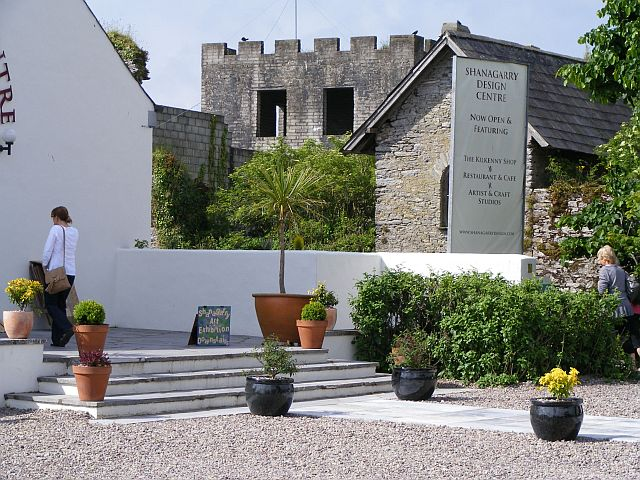
- Shanagarry Castle

- Location in Ireland
- Coordinates: 51°51′07.56″N 08°02′03.85″W
- Country: Ireland
- Province: Munster
- County: County Cork
- Dáil constituency: Cork East
- EU Parliament: South

Population (2022)
  - Total: 700
- Time zone: UTC+0 (WET)
  - Summer (DST): UTC-1 (IST (WEST))

Shanagarry (Irish: An Seangharraí, meaning 'the old garden (or court)') is a village in east County Cork in Ireland. The village is located near Ireland's south coast, approximately 35 kilometres (22 mi) east of Cork, on the R632 regional road.

Shanagarry is known for the Ballymaloe Cookery School, in the home and gardens of celebrity chef Darina Allen. Also resident here is Darina's daughter-in-law and chef Rachel Allen.

Shanagarry Castle passed to the family of William Penn in the 1660s; it was his occasional residence before he left for Pennsylvania and started his Holy Experiment. Also to be found in Shanagarry is the historic Old Road, an ancient Irish causeway and home to the original residents of the village.

Shanagarry is also the home village of the Russell Rovers hurling and football teams. The teams are made up of people from Shanagarry, Ballycotton and Churchtown South.

== Surrounding area ==
About 2 km (1.2 mi) from Shanagarry, just off the road to Ballycotton, lies Ballynamona beach. The coastline at Shanagarry and Ballynamona forms part of the Ballycotton Bay Special Protection Area (SPA) and is home to herons, oystercatchers and cormorants.

== See also ==
- List of towns and villages in Ireland
