= List of baronies of Ireland =

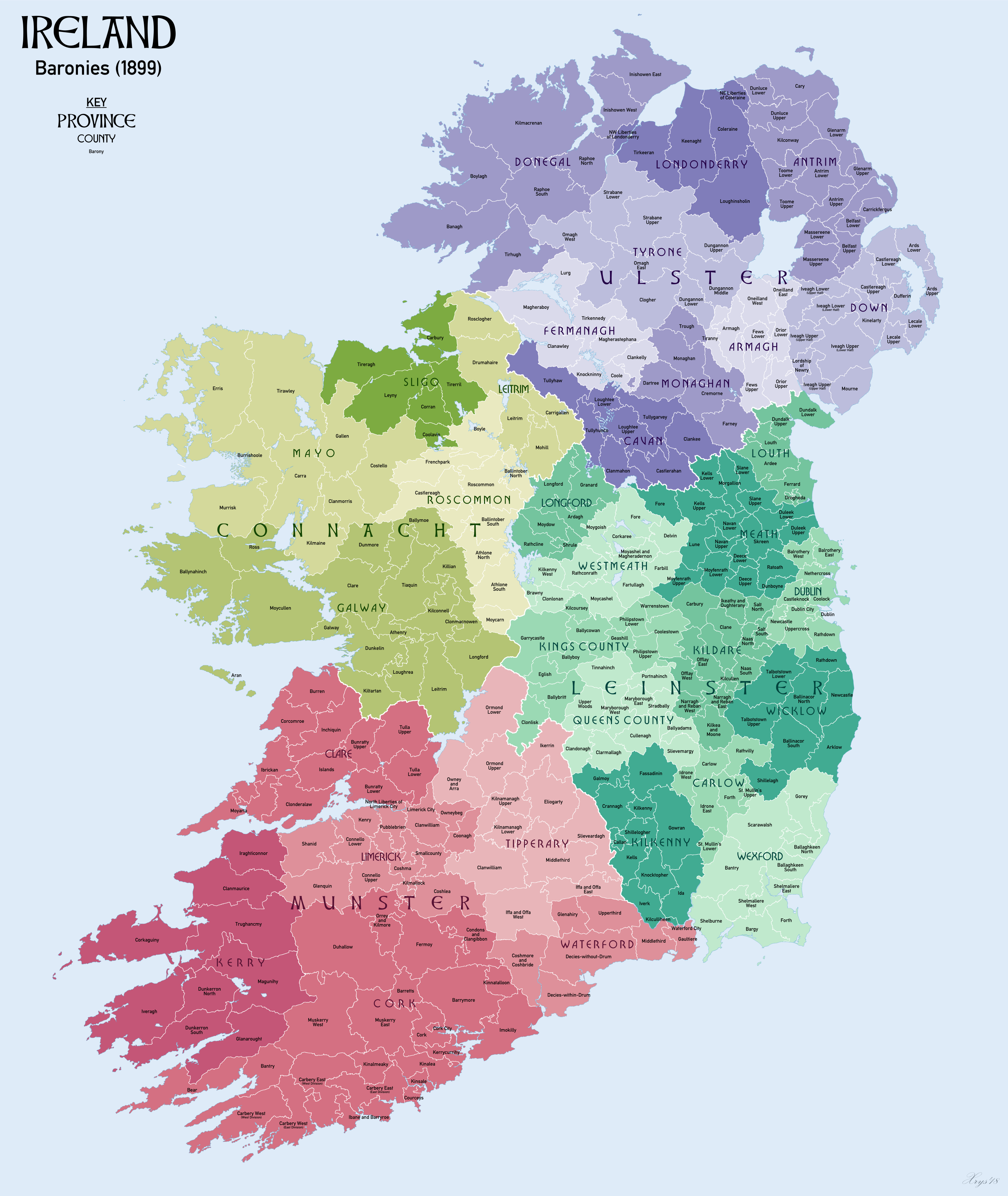
Map of the Baronies of Ireland in 1899

This is a list of the baronies of Ireland. Baronies were subdivisions of counties, mainly cadastral but with some administrative functions prior to the Local Government (Ireland) Act 1898.

== Final list ==
The final catalogue of baronies numbered 331, with an average area of 255 km^{2} (98 sq mi; 63,000 acres); therefore, each county was divided, on average, into 10 or 11 baronies. A figure of 273 is also quoted, by combining those divided into half-baronies, as by East/West, North/South, or Upper/Middle/Lower divisions.

Every point in Ireland is in precisely one of the listed divisions. However, the municipal area of the four cities with barony status in 1898 has extended since then into the surrounding baronies. Prior to 1898, the baronies around Dublin City were shrunk accordingly as they ceded land to the expanding city; but there is now land which is both within the current city boundaries and within one of the pre-1898 county baronies. Notably, the Barony of Dublin, created in 1842, is entirely within the city, although still separate from the Barony of Dublin City.

Creation date is sometimes specified as an upper bound (and possibly a lower bound) rather than the precise year:

- "1542"/"By 1542": Barony created/listed in the act 34 Hen. 8. c. 1 (I) which divided counties Meath and Westmeath.
- "By 1574" indicates baronies in Connacht and Thomond (Clare) listed in 1574.
- "By 1593" indicates baronies in the Pale represented at a 1593 militia hosting at the Hill of Tara.
- "By 1598" indicates baronies in County Kerry listed on the map of the Desmond or Clancarthy Survey of 1598.
- "By 1603" indicates baronies in County Fermanagh recorded by the commission which met on Devenish Island in July 1603.
- "By 1609" indicates baronies included in maps of the escheated counties of Ulster (made in 1609, reprinted by the Ordnance Survey in 1861).
- "By 1672" indicates baronies depicted in Hiberniae Delineatio, "Perry's Atlas", engraved in 1671-2 by William Petty from the data of the Down Survey. This delimited all, and described most, of the baronies then extant. Many of these baronies had existed since the late 16th century.
- "By 1792" indicates baronies listed in 1792 in Memoir of a map of Ireland by Daniel Beaufort.
- "Divided by 1821" indicates where a single barony in Hiberniae Delineatio corresponds to two (half-)baronies in the 1821 census data. These divisions had been effected by varying statutory means in the intervening decades.

County	Name	Irish name	Creation date	Area (acres, 1872)	Notes
Antrim	Antrim Lower	Aontroim Íochtarach	Divided 1792–1798	80,826	Named after Antrim town
Antrim	Antrim Upper	Aontroim Uachtarach	Divided 1792–1798	36,489	Named after Antrim town
Antrim	Belfast Lower	Béal Feirste Íochtarach	Divided 1792–1798	56,142	Named after Belfast town (now city)
Antrim	Belfast Upper	Béal Feirste Uachtarach	Divided 1792–1798	32,942	Named after Belfast town (now city)
Antrim	Carrickfergus	Carraig Fhearghais	By 1325 (Note: Date of the charter which granted county status to the city or town.)	16,702	Formerly a county corporate: the County of the Town of Carrickfergus
Antrim	Cary or Carey	Cathraí	By 1672	75,035	Named after the Cothrugu (Cotraigib, Crotraigib), an ancient tribe.
Antrim	Dunluce Lower	Dún Libhse Íochtarach	Divided 1792–1798	30,575	See also Dunluce Castle.
Antrim	Dunluce Upper	Dún Libhse Uachtarach	Divided 1792–1798	52,788	See also Dunluce Castle.
Antrim	Glenarm Lower	Gleann Arma Íochtarach	Divided 1792–1798	64,945	Named after Glenarm village
Antrim	Glenarm Upper	Gleann Arma Uachtarach	Divided 1792–1798	24,032	Named after Glenarm village
Antrim	Kilconway	Coill Chonmhaí	By 1672	68,640	Name means "forest of the Conmhaicne".
Antrim	Massereene Lower	Mása Ríona Íochtarach	Divided 1792–1798	27,228	Namesake of Viscount Massereene. The name means "Queen's hill" and originally belonged to a monastery.
Antrim	Massereene Upper	Mása Ríona Uachtarach	Divided 1792–1798	56,675	Namesake of Viscount Massereene. The name means "Queen's hill" and originally belonged to a monastery.
Antrim	Toome Lower	Tuaim Íochtarach	Divided 1792–1798	36,135	Named after Toome village
Antrim	Toome Upper	Tuaim Uachtarach	Divided 1792–1798	47,571	Named after Toome village
Armagh	Armagh	Ard Mhacha	By 1609	47,645	Named after Armagh town (now city)
Armagh	Fews Lower	Na Feá Íochtaracha	Divided by 1745; Fews by 1609	29,757	From Irish Na Feadha, "the lengths"
Armagh	Fews Upper	Na Feá Uachtaracha	Divided by 1745; Fews by 1609	47,433	From Irish Na Feadha, "the lengths"
Armagh	Oneilland East	Uí Nialláin Thoir	Divided 1792–1807; Oneilland by 1609	20,890	Named after the Uí Nialláin tribe — not to be confused with the O'Neills.
Armagh	Oneilland West	Uí Nialláin Thiar	Divided 1792–1807; Oneilland by 1609	57,584	Named after the Uí Nialláin tribe — not to be confused with the O'Neills.
Armagh	Orior Lower	Na hOirthir Íochtaracha	Divided 1792–1807; Orior by 1609	31,927	From the tribe of the Airthir ("easterners"), part of the Airgíalla.
Armagh	Orior Upper	Na hOirthir Uachtaracha	Divided 1792–1807; Orior by 1609	49,086	From the tribe of the Airthir ("easterners"), part of the Airgíalla.
Armagh	Tiranny or Turaney	Tuath Threana	By 1609	27,397	Named after the Uí Threna tribe.
Carlow	Carlow	Ceatharlach	By 1672	31,353	Named after Carlow town
Carlow	Forth	Fotharta	By 1672	39,510	Named from the Irish Fothairt Mag Feá, "fothairt of the beech plain". A fothairt was a kingdom not ruled by a branch of the provincial ruling family.
Carlow	Idrone East	Uí Dhróna Thoir	Divided in 1799	52,857	Named after the ancient ruling family, the Uí Dróna.
Carlow	Idrone West	Uí Dhróna Thiar	Divided in 1799	23,066	Named after the ancient ruling family, the Uí Dróna.
Carlow	Rathvilly	Ráth Bhile	By 1672	44,806	Named after Rathvilly village
Carlow	St. Mullin's Lower	Tigh Moling Íochtarach	Divided by 1841	21,914	Named after St Mullin's village. Does not border St. Mullin's Upper.
Carlow	St. Mullin's Upper	Tigh Moling Uachtarach	Divided by 1841	7,784	Named after St. Mullin's village; the land was a detached fragment of the original St. Mullin's barony, and does not border St. Mullin's Lower.
Cavan	Castlerahan	Caisleán Raithin	By 1609	69,279	Named after Castlerahan parish, ultimately from the ancient Castlera[c]han hillfort.
Cavan	Clankee	Clann Chaoich	By 1609	64,377	The name means "Caoch's clan"; Caoch (meaning "blind" or "squint") was the nickname of Niall mac Cathal na Beithí mac Annadh Ó Raghallaigh (died 1296).
Cavan	Clanmahon	Clann Mhathúna	By 1609	51,170	The name is from Clann Mathúna, originally Cloinne Mathghamhna, "Mathgamhain's tribe."
Cavan	Loughtee Lower	Lucht Tí Íochtarach	Divided by 1821; Loughtee by 1609	28,240	Name derives from lucht tighe Még Mathghamhna, "people of the household of Mac Mahon"; the land was allocated to the vassals of the McMahon.
Cavan	Loughtee Upper	Lucht Tí Uachtarach	Divided by 1821; Loughtee by 1609	63,842	Name derives from lucht tighe Még Mathghamhna, "people of the household of Mac Mahon"; the land was allocated to the vassals of the McMahon.
Cavan	Tullygarvey	Teallach Ghairbhíth	By 1609	59,871	The name means "tribe of Gairbhéith", referring to a king of c. AD 700.
Cavan	Tullyhaw	Teallach Eathach	By 1609	89,852	The name means "Eochaid's tribe", referring to a king of c. AD 650.
Cavan	Tullyhunco or Tulloghonoho	Teallach Dhúnchadha	By 1609	39,624	The name means "Dúnchadh's tribe," referring to a king.
Clare	Bunratty Lower	Bun Raite Íochtarach	Divided by 1841	57,314	Named after Bunratty village. Bunratty aka Dangan-i-viggan or Dangan existed by 1574.
Clare	Bunratty Upper	Bun Raite Uachtarach	Divided by 1841	53,595	Named after Bunratty village. Bunratty aka Dangan-i-viggan or Dangan existed by 1574.
Clare	Burren	Boirinn	By 1574	74,360	The barony is called "Burren"; the region is now usually "The Burren", a name meaning "great rock." Formerly aka Gragans.
Clare	Clonderalaw	Cluain idir Dhá Lá	By 1574	75,878	Named after Clonderalaw Castle. Formerly aka East Corkewasken.
Clare	Corcomroe	Corca Mrua	By 1574	61,385	Named after the Corco Modhruadh, formerly the ruling dynasty in the area. Formerly aka Dowaghy connoghor/Tuoghmore y Conour.
Clare	Ibrickan or Ibrickane	Uí Bhreacáin	By 1672	56,696	Named after the Uí Bhreacáin, formerly the ruling dynasty in the area
Clare	Inchiquin	Inse Uí Chuinn	By 1672	88,387	Name is Irish for "Quinn's water meadow". Namesake of Baron Inchiquin
Clare	Islands	Na hOileáin	By 1574	63,592	Name refers to the islands of the Fergus estuary. Formerly aka Cloynerawde/Clonraude
Clare	Moyarta	Maigh Fhearta	By 1574	68,679	Name from Irish Mag Fearta, "plain of graves". Formerly aka West Corkewasken.
Clare	Tulla Lower	An Tulach Íochtarach	Divided by 1841	73,454	Named after Tulla town. Tully (formerly aka Tullaghnenaspule/Tullaghenaspy) existed by 1574
Clare	Tulla Upper	An Tulach Uachtarach	Divided by 1841	94,919	Named after Tulla town. Tully (formerly aka Tullaghnenaspule/Tullaghenaspy) existed by 1574
Cork	Bantry	Beanntraí	By 1672	59,216	Named after Bantry town
Cork	Barretts	Baróidigh	By 1672	31,761	Named after the Barrett family.
Cork	Barrymore	Barraigh Mhóra	By 1672	148,143	Namesake of the Earl of Barrymore. Name means "Great Barrys".
Cork	Bear	Béarra	By 1672	89,986	Namesake of the Beara Peninsula. It is said to be named after a princess named Béirre, or possibly settlers from Iberia.
Cork	Carbery East, East Division	Cairbrigh Thoir, an Roinn Thoir	Divided by 1821 (Note: Carbury East and Carbury West were already separate baronies by 1672.)	67,235	Formerly one large barony of Carbery, named after the Uí Chairpre.
Cork	Carbery East, West Division	Cairbrigh Thoir, an Roinn Thiar	Divided by 1821	105,141	Formerly one large barony of Carbery, named after the Uí Chairpre.
Cork	Carbery West, East Division	Cairbrigh Thiar, an Roinn Thoir	Divided by 1821	79,263	Formerly one large barony of Carbery, named after the Uí Chairpre.
Cork	Carbery West, West Division	Cairbrigh Thiar, an Roinn Thiar	Divided by 1821	109,178	Formerly one large barony of Carbery, named after the Uí Chairpre.
Cork	Condons and Clangibbon	Condúnaigh agus Clann Ghiobúin	By 1672	78,481	The territories of two families: the Condons or Cauntons, and the FitzGibbons or White Knight
Cork	Cork City	Cathair Chorcaí	1608	2,265	Formerly a county corporate, originally including the Liberties which later formed the separate Barony of Cork. It contains seven civil parishes.
Cork	Cork	Corcaigh	By 1841	43,813	Formed from the "Liberties of Cork", the portion previously within the County of the city of Cork which was not within the borough of Cork.
Cork	Courceys	Cúrsaigh	By 1672	8,812	Named after the de Courcy barons.
Cork	Duhallow	Dúiche Ealla	By 1672	232,328	Name means "land of the Munster Blackwater".
Cork	Fermoy	Mainistir Fhear Maí	By 1672	121,188	Namesake of Fermoy town, which is actually in Condons and Clangibbon
Cork	Ibane and Barryroe	Uí Bhamhna agus Barraigh Rua	United by 1711	35,291	Ibane and Barryroe are peninsulas on opposite sides of Clonakilty Bay. The names mean, respectively, "Descendants of Bamna" and "Red-haired Barrys".
Cork	Imokilly	Uí Mhic Coille	By 1672	93,617	Named after the Uí Meic Caille, a sept of the Uí Liatháin.
Cork	Kerrycurrihy	Ciarraí Cuirche	Divided by 1821	23,957	Kerrycurrihy and Kinalea united in Down Survey. A tribal name: the Ciarraige Cuirchi.
Cork	Kinalea	Cineál Aodha	Divided by 1821	50,692	Kerrycurrihy and Kinalea united in Down Survey. The "tribe of Aéd".
Cork	Kinalmeaky	Cineál mBéice	By 1672	36,068	Named after the Cenél mBeice, "Beice's people", a sept of the O'Mahonys.
Cork	Kinnatalloon	Coill na Talún	By 1672	27,718	The name means "Tolamhnach's forest", referring to a 7th-century chief of the Uí Liatháin.
Cork	Kinsale	Cionn tSáile	By 1672 (Note: Formally granted barony status by the Kinsale Act 1819.)	12,430	Named after Kinsale town
Cork	Muskerry East	Múscraí Thoir	Divided by 1821	122,874	Namesake of Baron Muskerry. The only barony split between the East and West Ridings of County Cork. Named after the ancient tribe of the Múscraige.
Cork	Muskerry West	Múscraí Thiar	Divided by 1821	188,487	Namesake of Baron Muskerry. Named after the ancient tribe of the Múscraige.
Cork	Orrery and Kilmore	Orbhraí agus An Choill Mhór	United by 1821	69,346	Namesake of Earl of Orrery. Named after the Orbhraighe tribe, while Kilmore means "great forest".
Donegal	Banagh	Báinigh	Divided in 1791	177,288	Territory of the Cinel Boghaine, descended from Niall of the Nine Hostages. Combined with Boylagh till 1791
Donegal	Boylagh	Baollaigh	Divided in 1791	156,245	Territory of the O'Boyles. Combined with Banagh till 1791.
Donegal	Inishowen East	Inis Eoghain Thoir	Divided by 1851	123,356	Name means "Eoghan's peninsula"
Donegal	Inishowen West	Inis Eoghain Thiar	Divided by 1851	76,828	Name means "Eoghan's peninsula"
Donegal	Kilmacrenan	Cill Mhic Réanáin	By 1672	310,325	Named after Kilmacrenan village
Donegal	Raphoe North	Ráth Bhoth Thuaidh	Divided 1807–1821	80,610	Named after Raphoe town
Donegal	Raphoe South	Ráth Bhoth Theas	Divided 1807–1821	140,841	Named after Raphoe town
Donegal	Tirhugh	Tír Aodha	By 1672	125,828	Name means "Aodh's country"
Down	Ards (or Ardes) Lower	An Aird Íochtarach	Divided by 1851	38,462	Namesake of the Ards Peninsula. Aird is Irish for "promontory".
Down	Ards (or Ardes) Upper	An Aird Uachtarach	Divided by 1851	29,697	Namesake of the Ards Peninsula. Aird is Irish for "promontory". Includes the feudal barony of Middle Ards within its territory.
Down	Castlereagh Lower	An Caisleán Riabhach Íochtarach	Divided by 1841	51,452	Named after Castlereagh townland. Gives its name to the borough of Castlereagh.
Down	Castlereagh Upper	An Caisleán Riabhach Uachtarach	Divided by 1841	53,856	Named after Castlereagh townland. Gives its name to the borough of Castlereagh.
Down	Dufferin	An Duifrian	By 1672	17,208	Name from the Irish duibhthrian, "black third".
Down	Iveagh Lower, Lower Half	Uíbh Eachach Íochtarach, An Leath Íochtair	Divided by 1851	46,057	Named after the Uí Echach Cobo, a Gaelic people and territory in the region.
Down	Iveagh Lower, Upper Half	Uíbh Eachach Íochtarach, An Leath Uachtair	Divided by 1851	47,538	Named after the Uí Echach Cobo, a Gaelic people and territory in the region.
Down	Iveagh Upper, Lower Half	Uíbh Eachach Uachtarach, An Leath Íochtair	Divided by 1851	96,317	Named after the Uí Echach Cobo, a Gaelic people and territory in the region.
Down	Iveagh Upper, Upper Half	Uíbh Eachach Uachtarach, An Leath Uachtair	Divided by 1851	63,249	Named after the Uí Echach Cobo, a Gaelic people and territory in the region.
Down	Kinelarty	Cineál Fhártaigh	By 1672	40,322	Name means "Faghartach's kindred"
Down	Lecale Lower	Leath Cathail Íochtarach	Divided by 1851	30,920	Namesake of the Lecale peninsula. The name means "Cathal's half".
Down	Lecale Upper	Leath Cathail Uachtarach	Divided by 1851	30,521	Namesake of the Lecale peninsula. The name means "Cathal's half".
Down	Lordship of Newry	An tIúr	By 1672	15,813	The historic Lordship encompassed lands on both sides of the Down-Armagh border. Later, the jurisdiction of the "Lordship of Newry" for baronial presentment sessions extended only to County Down. Newry town (now city) is now entirely within County Down.
Down	Mourne	Múrna	By 1672	47,822	Named after the Mourne Mountains. A half-barony in the Down Survey.
Dublin	Balrothery East	Baile an Ridire Thoir	Divided 1842	30,005	Named after Balrothery village. Balrothery existed by 1593.
Dublin	Balrothery West	Baile an Ridire Thiar	Divided 1842	25,195	Named after Balrothery village. Balrothery existed by 1593.
Dublin	Castleknock	Caisleán Cnucha	By 1593	21,371	Named after Castleknock village (now suburban); from 1861, reduced in size by the expanded borders of Dublin city
Dublin	Coolock	An Chúlóg	By 1593	26,614	Named after the historical village of Coolock, now suburban; from 1861, reduced in size by the expanded borders of Dublin city
Dublin	Dublin	Baile Átha Cliath	1840	1,693	Created by the 1840 Acts from land previously liberties in the county of the city. Its name and area were confirmed by the Dublin Baronies Act 1842. That the distinction between the Barony of Dublin and the Barony of Dublin City persists is shown by a 1985 statutory instrument adjusting their boundaries, and the inclusion of the 1842 Act in a 2007 list of unrepealed legislation. Both baronies lie within the former county borough of Dublin, since 2001 redesignated the City of Dublin.
Dublin	Dublin City	Cathair Bhaile Átha Cliath	1548	2,114 (Note: The Barony of Dublin was included with the City of Dublin in the 1872 report at a combined area of 3807 acres; excluding the 1693 acres reported for the Barony in the 1877 report leaves 2114 acres for the City.)	Formerly a county corporate
Dublin	Nethercross	An Chrois Íochtarach	By 1672	21,818	Named after a cross erected by Saint Cainnech in Finglas. Compare Uppercross.
Dublin	Newcastle	An Caisleán Nua	By 1593	22,876	Named after the village of Newcastle, County Dublin. Not related to the Wicklow barony of Newcastle. In the Down Survey, Newscastle and Uppercross were not distinguished.
Dublin	Rathdown	Ráth an Dúin	By 1593	29,974	A half-barony from 1606, with the Wicklow half-barony of Rathdown separated out. From 1861, reduced in size by the expanded borders of Dublin city. Named after Rathdown Castle.
Dublin	Uppercross	An Chrois Uachtarach	1792–1821	37,307	Compare Nethercross. In the Down Survey, Uppercross and Newcastle were not distinguished. From 1861, reduced in size by the expanded borders of Dublin city
Fermanagh	Clanawley or Glenawley	Clann Amhlaoibh	By 1603	72,894	"Awley" is from Mac Amhlaoibh and Mac Amhalghaidh (Irish septs)
Fermanagh	Clankelly or Clonkelly	Clann Cheallaigh	By 1603	39,067	Clan of the Kellys
Fermanagh	Coole	An Chúil	By 1603	17,320	A half-barony in the Down Survey. Name means "corner".
Fermanagh	Knockninny	Cnoc Ninnidh	By 1603	27,732	Named after the hill of Saint Ninnidh
Fermanagh	Lurg	Lorg	By 1603	66,163	Named after the Tuath Luirg (Fir Luirg; "tribe/men of the path").
Fermanagh	Magheraboy	An Machaire Buí	By 1603	79,038	Name means "yellow plain"
Fermanagh	Magherastephana	An Machaire Steafánach	By 1603	58,979	Name origin unclear; "plain of the FitzStephens?"
Fermanagh	Tirkennedy	Tír Cheannada	By 1603	56,267	Named after Fergus son of Cremthann, nicknamed Cennfhota ("long head"). No relation to the surname Kennedy.
Galway	Aran or Arran	Árainn	By 1574	11,287	Conterminous with the Aran Islands; Inishmore (Árainn Mhór) is named for its shape (ara = kidney)
Galway	Athenry	Baile Átha an Rí	By 1672	25,782	Named after Athenry town; called "Halfe Barony and liberties of Athenrey" in the Down Survey.
Galway	Ballymoe	Béal Átha Mó	By 1672	89,270	Named after Ballymoe village; Half with Ballymoe, County Roscommon. Full barony existed in Galway by 1574.
Galway	Ballynahinch	Baile na hInse	By 1574	189,813	Named after Ballynahinch town; "Ballenanen" in Down Survey (or Hibernia Delinateo)
Galway	Clare	Baile Chláir	By 1574	127,486	Namesake of the River Clare and village of Claregalway. The name means "[river of the] plain".
Galway	Clonmacnowen or Clonmacnoon	Clann Mhac nEoghain	By 1672	35,467	"Clanemtoneen" in Down Survey (or Hibernia Delinateo). Name means "Valley of the sons of Eoghan."
Galway	Dunkellin	Dún Coillín	By 1574	83,371	Name means "Coillín's hillfort"
Galway	Dunmore	Dún Mór	By 1574	71,011	Named after Dunmore village
Galway	Galway	Gaillimh	1610	22,492	Formerly a county corporate: the county of the Town (now city) of Galway
Galway	Kilconnell or Kilconnnel	Cill Chonaill	By 1574	64,819	Named after Kilconnell village
Galway	Killian	Cill Liatháin	By 1574	52,388	Name means "Liatháin's church"
Galway	Kiltartan	Cill Tartan	By 1574	65,664	"Killcartar" in Down Survey (or Hibernia Delinateo). Was originally named after Saint Attracta's church. Kiltaraght in 1574.
Galway	Leitrim	Liatroim	By 1574	109,567	Now also partly in County Clare. Name means "grey ridge".
Galway	Longford	An Longfort	By 1574	96,506	Name means "ship landing-ground", referring to a longphort on a tributary of the River Shannon.
Galway	Loughrea	Baile Locha Riach	By 1574	64,406	Named after Loughrea town; called "Half Barony of Lougheagh" in the Down Survey.
Galway	Moycullen	Maigh Cuilinn	By 1574	202,386	Named after Moycullen village
Galway	Ross	An Ros	By 1574	77,351	In County Mayo in 1574; transferred to Galway within decades; since 1898 partly in Mayo. The name means "the promontory".
Galway	Tiaquin	Tigh Dachoinne	By 1574	110,135	Name means "House of Dachoinne," a saint.
Kerry	Clanmaurice	Clann Mhuiris	By 1598	120,520	Name means "Maurice's clan", referring to Maurice FitzGerald, 1st Earl of Desmond.
Kerry	Corkaguiny	Corca Dhuibhne	By 1598	138,605	Named after the ancient ruling tribe, the Corcu Duibne.
Kerry	Dunkerron North	Dún Ciaráin Thuaidh	Divided by 1851	72,414	Namesake of Dunkerron Castle. Name means "Ciarán's hillfort".
Kerry	Dunkerron South	Dún Ciaráin Theas	Divided by 1851	96,289	Namesake of Dunkerron Castle. Name means "Ciarán's hillfort".
Kerry	Glanarought or Glanerought	Gleann na Ruachtaí	By 1598	121,865	Name means "Valley of the O'Roughty"
Kerry	Iraghticonnor	Oireacht Uí Chonchúir	By 1598	88,105	Name means "Inheritance of the O'Connors"
Kerry	Iveragh	Uíbh Ráthach	By 1598	159,980	Name means "Descendants of Ráthach." On the Kilcoolaght East ogham stone (CIIC 211), this name appears in the Primitive Irish form Rittaveccas.
Kerry	Magunihy or Magonhy	Maigh gCoinchinn	By 1598	166,427	Name means "Coinchinn's plain"; a personal name meaning "wolf-warrior".
Kerry	Trughanacmy or Trughenackmy	Triúcha an Aicme	By 1598	194,593	Name means "cantred of the tribe"
Kildare	Carbury or Carbery	Cairbre	By 1672	48,286	Named after Carbury
Kildare	Clane	Claonadh	By 1593	32,023	Named after Clane village
Kildare	Connell or Great Connell	Connail	By 1593	34,785	Named after [Old] Connell, a holy site and ford near Newbridge.
Kildare	Ikeathy and Oughterany	Uí Chéithigh agus Uachtar Fhine	United by 1608	25,753	The baronies of Ikeathy and Oughterany were united some time between 1558 and 1608. "Okeathy Ocerny" in 1593.
Kildare	Kilcullen	Cill Chuillinn	By 1593	8,492	Named after Kilcullen town. A half-barony in the Down Survey.
Kildare	Kilkea and Moone	Cill Chá agus Maoin	By 1593	46,286	Named after the villages of Kilkea and Moone.
Kildare	Naas North	An Nás Thuaidh	By 1593	25,579	Named after Naas town. "Naas Upper" in 1593.
Kildare	Naas South	An Nás Theas	By 1593	27,478	Named after Naas town. "Naas Nether" in 1593.
Kildare	Narragh and Reban East	An Fhorrach agus an Réabán Thoir	Divided by 1807 (Note: The separate baronies of Narragh and Reban existed by 1593, and the united barony of Narragh and Reban existed by 1672)	21,374	Named after Narragh and Rheban Castle. Namesake of the hereditary Barony of Norragh.
Kildare	Narragh and Reban West	An Fhorrach agus an Réabán Thiar	Divided by 1807	22,136	(See Narragh and Reban East)
Kildare	Offaly East	Uíbh Fhailí Thoir	Divided by 1807	47,029	Named after Uí Failghe; also the name of County Offaly to the west. Barony of Offaly existed in 1593.
Kildare	Offaly West	Uíbh Fhailí Thiar	Divided by 1807	40,603	(see Offaly West)
Kildare	North Salt	An Léim Thuaidh	Divided by 1807	21,930	"Salt" derived from Saltus Salmonis, the Latin name for Leixlip. Barony of Salt existed by 1593.
Kildare	South Salt	An Léim Theas	Divided by 1807	16,655	(See North Salt)
Kilkenny	Callan	Callainn	By 1672	5,653	Named after Callan town; "Callen Liberties" in Down Survey. The 1836 Act "for removing doubts" explicitly states the town and liberties "shall be deemed and taken to be a barony"
Kilkenny	Crannagh or Crannach	Crannach	By 1672	58,675	Name means "abounding in trees".
Kilkenny	Fassadinin or Fassadining	Fásach an Deighnín	By 1672	68,174	Name means "wilderness by the River Dinan".
Kilkenny	Galmoy	Gabhalmhaigh	By 1672	40,236	Name means "plain of the River Goul".
Kilkenny	Gowran	Gabhrán	By 1672	111,706	Named after Gowran village
Kilkenny	Ida, or "Ida, Igrinn and Iberchon"	Uí Dheá	By 1672	60,132	Now also partly in County Wexford. A tribal name: the Uí Dheaghaidh, descendants of Deagaid.
Kilkenny	Iverk	Uíbh Eirc	By 1672	40,528	Name means "descendants of Erc".
Kilkenny	Kells	Ceanannas	By 1672	38,376	Named after Kells, County Kilkenny.
Kilkenny	Kilculliheen	Cill Choilchín	By 1848	2,139	Originally a civil parish in the county of the city of Waterford, transferred to the county in 1840. Its status as a barony separate from Gaultier was not recognised by the census until 1871. It was transferred to County Kilkenny in 1898. It is now also partly in the city of Waterford.
Kilkenny	Kilkenny	Cill Chainnigh	1610	921	Formerly a county corporate: the County of the city of Kilkenny
Kilkenny	Knocktopher	Cnoc an Tóchair	By 1672	46,765	Named after Knocktopher village
Kilkenny	Shillelogher	Síol Fhaolchair	By 1672	36,684	A tribal name, meaning "descendants of Faolchar", a name meaning "wolf-love"
Laois	Ballyadams	Baile Ádaim	By 1672	24,081	Named after Ballyadams Castle
Laois	Clandonagh	Clann Donnchadha	1846 (Note: Split by the Ordnance Survey of Ireland in 1846, but used as a division in the enumeration of the 1841 census.)	43,733	One of three traditional subunits of Upper Ossory, which was extant as a barony by 1657 and formally abolished in 1846. "Clan Dunphy", named after the descendants of Donnchad Midi.
Laois	Clarmallagh	Clár Maí Locha	1846	43,533	One of three traditional subunits of Upper Ossory, which was extant as a barony by 1657 and formally abolished in 1846. Name means "Flat land of Maigh Locha [lake plain]", referring to Grantstown Lake.
Laois	Cullenagh or Cullinagh	Cuileannach	By 1672	44,094	Named after the Cullenagh Mountains.
Laois	Maryborough East	Port Laoise Thoir	Divided by 1807	25,160	Named after Portlaoise, formerly named Maryborough
Laois	Maryborough West	Port Laoise Thiar	Divided by 1807	41,914	Named after Portlaoise, formerly named Maryborough
Laois	Portnahinch or Portnehinch	Port na hInse	By 1672	35,835	Named after Portnahinch, a landing-ground on the River Barrow.
Laois	Slievemargy, Slewmergie, Slieuemargue, Slieuemargy	Sliabh Mairge	By 1672	35,490	Named after the Slievemargy hills. Now also partly in County Carlow
Laois	Stradbally	An Sráidbhaile	By 1672	27,895	Named after Stradbally village
Laois	Tinnahinch or Tinnehinch	Tigh na hInse	By 1672	54,187	Named after Tinnahinch village
Laois	Upper Woods or Upperwoods	An Choill Uachtarach	1846	48,926	One of three traditional subunits of Upper Ossory, which was extant as a barony by 1657 and formally abolished in 1846. Named after the forests of the Slieve Bloom Mountains.
Leitrim	Carrigallen	Carraig Álainn	By 1672	62,395	Named after Carrigallen
Leitrim	Drumahaire	Droim Dhá Thiar	By 1574	110,146	Named after Drumahaire. Considered part of Sligo in 1574.
Leitrim	Leitrim	Liatroim	By 1574	59,164	Named after Leitrim village. Considered part of Sligo in 1574.
Leitrim	Mohill	Maothail	By 1672	62,904	Named after Mohill
Leitrim	Rosclougher or Rossclogher	Ros Clochair	By 1672	81,601	Named after Rosclogher Castle.
Limerick	Clanwilliam	Clann Liam	By 1672	55,627	Name means "clan of William de Burgh"
Limerick	Connello Lower or Conello Lower	Conallaigh Íochtaracha	Divided by 1821	47,850	Territory of the O'Connells.
Limerick	Connello Upper or Conello Upper	Conallaigh Uachtaracha	Divided by 1821	61,256	Territory of the O'Connells.
Limerick	Coonagh	Uí Chuanach	By 1672	36,323	Name means "descendants of Cuana".
Limerick	Coshlea or Costlea	Cois Sléibhe	By 1672	95,232	Name literally means "foot of the mountain".
Limerick	Coshma	Cois Máighe	By 1672	49,018	Name means "banks of the Maigue".
Limerick	Glenquin	Gleann an Choim	By 1841	96,402	Prior to 1841, part of Connello Upper.
Limerick	Kenry	Caonraí	By 1672	26,222	From the Cáenraige, an ancient tribe.
Limerick	Kilmallock or Kilmallock Liberties	Cill Mocheallóg	By 1672	4,074	Named after Kilmallock. Not enumerated in the 1821 census.
Limerick	Limerick City	Cathair Luimnigh	1609	2,074	Formerly a county corporate; includes the "[South] Liberties" of Down Survey
Limerick	North Liberties of Limerick city	Na Líbeartaí Thuaidh	By 1872	3,050	formerly Liberties; the "North Liberties" were record separately from the "South Liberties" in the Down Survey.
Limerick	Owneybeg or Owenybeg	Uaithne Beag	By 1672	27,211	The territory of Uaithni encompassed Owneybeg and part of Owney and Arra
Limerick	Pubblebrien	Pobal Bhriain	By 1672	30,138	Name means "Brian's people", referring to Brian Boru.
Limerick	Shanid	Seanaid	By 1841	84,075	Prior to 1841, part of Connello Lower.
Limerick	Smallcounty	An Déis Bheag	By 1672	44,424	The Irish name means "the little vassal tribe"; see Deisi.
Londonderry	Coleraine	Cúil Raithin	By 1591	85,836	Named after Coleraine town, although the town itself is in the North East Liberties of Coleraine. A half-barony in 1807, including the south-west liberties of Coleraine.
Londonderry	Keenaght or Kenaught	Cianachta	By 1591 (as Limavady)	130,329	Named after the Ciannachta tribe, descended from Tadc mac Céin.
Londonderry	Loughinsholin	Loch Inse Uí Fhloinn	By 1591	171,662	Name means "lough of O'Lynn's island", referring to a lake containing a crannóg.
Londonderry	North East Liberties of Coleraine	Líbeartaí Thoir Thuaidh Chúil Raithin	By 1672	18,005	formerly Liberties of Coleraine town.
Londonderry	North-West Liberties of Londonderry	Líbeartaí Thiar Thuaidh Dhoire	By 1672	11,506	formerly Liberties of Londonderry city.
Londonderry	Tirkeeran or Tyrkeeran	Tír Mhic Caoirthinn	By 1591 (as Anagh)	94,014	A half-barony in 1807, including the south-east liberties of Londonderry. Name means "land of the sons of Cartin."
Longford	Ardagh	Ardach	By 1629	40,223	Named after Ardagh village
Longford	Granard	Gránard	By 1629	63,857	Named after Granard village
Longford	Longford	An Longfort	By 1629	57,243	Named after Longford town
Longford	Moydow	Maigh Dumha	By 1629	34,470	Named after Moydow village
Longford	Rathcline	Ráth Claon	By 1629	40,421	Named after Rathcline Castle.
Longford	Shrule or Abbeyshrule	Sruthail	By 1629	21,006	Named after Abbeyshrule
Louth	Ardee	Baile Átha Fhirdhia	By 1593	53,832	Named after Ardee town
Louth	Drogheda	Droichead Átha	1412	4,497	Formerly a county corporate. A barony separate from the county was formed in 1840 from the portion previously within the County of the town of Drogheda which was not within the town of Drogheda. In 1844 was expected to be soon absorbed into Ferrard.
Louth	Dundalk Lower	Dún Dealgan Íochtarach	Divided by 1821	37,803	Named after Dundalk town
Louth	Dundalk Upper	Dún Dealgan Uachtarach	Divided by 1821	30,750	Named after Dundalk town
Louth	Ferrard	Fir Arda	By 1593	48,806	From Fera Arda Ciannachta, "men of high Ciannachta". Namesake of Viscount Massereene and Ferrard.
Louth	Louth	Lú	By 1672	25,704	Named after Louth village
Mayo	Burrishoole	Buiríos Umhaill	By 1574	145,172	Named after Burrishoole Castle; a few sources list Burrishoole split into "Burrishoole North" and "Burrishoole South"
Mayo	Carra	Ceara	By 1574	134,206	Named after Carra village. Called Burriscarra/Burisker in 1574.
Mayo	Clanmorris	Clann Mhuiris	By 1574	69,252	Namesake of Baron Clanmorris. Name means "Muiris' family". Called Croslwyhin/Crossboyne in 1574.
Mayo	Costello or Clancostello	Coistealaigh	By 1574	143,874	Now also partly in County Roscommon. Named after the Hiberno-Norman MacOisdealbhaigh (Costello) family. Called Beallahaunes/Ballyhaunis in 1574.
Mayo	Erris	Iorras	By 1672	230,452	Named after Erris village. A half-barony in the Gilbert Manuscript of the Down Survey. "Kunermore[Invermore], containing Erest [Erris] and Dondonell" is barony listed in 1574.
Mayo	Gallen	Gaileanga	By 1574	119,153	Named after the Gailenga tribe. Beallalahane in 1574.
Mayo	Kilmaine	Cill Mheáin	By 1574	95,284	Named after Kilmaine village
Mayo	Murrisk	Muraisc	By 1574	137,061	Named after Murrisk village
Mayo	Tirawley or Tyrawley	Tír Amhlaidh	By 1574	246,822	Name means "Amlaid's land", referring to Amalgaid mac Fiachrae. "Many"/Moyne in 1574.
Meath	Deece Lower	Déise Íochtarach	Divided by 1807	20,013	Deece barony present by 1542. Named after the Déisi Becc.
Meath	Deece Upper	Déise Uachtarach	Divided by 1807	28,763	Deece barony present by 1542. Named after the Déisi Becc.
Meath	Duleek Lower	Damhliag Íochtarach	Divided by 1807	37,772	Named after Duleek village. Now also partly in County Louth. Duleek barony present by 1542
Meath	Duleek Upper	Damhliag Uachtarach	Divided by 1807	28,463	Named after Duleek village. Duleek barony present by 1542
Meath	Dunboyne	Dún Búinne	By 1542	16,781	Named after Dunboyne town.
Meath	Fore or Demifore	Baile Fhobhair	By 1542	42,388	Half with Fore, County Westmeath since 1542. Named after Fore Abbey.
Meath	Kells Lower	Ceanannas Íochtarach	Divided by 1807	36,171	Named after Kells town. Kells barony present by 1542.
Meath	Kells Upper	Ceanannas Uachtarach	Divided by 1807	49,552	Named after Kells town. Kells barony present by 1542.
Meath	Lune	Luíne	By 1542	39,326	Named after the Luighne tribe.
Meath	Morgallion	Machaire Gaileang	By 1542	31,492	Name means "plain of the Gailenga", a medieval tribe.
Meath	Moyfenrath Lower	Maigh Fionnráithe Íochtarach	Divided by 1807	40,313	Moyfenrath barony present by 1542. The name means "plain of the fair fort".
Meath	Moyfenrath Upper	Maigh Fionnráithe Uachtarach	Divided by 1807	31,696	Moyfenrath barony present by 1542. The name means "plain of the fair fort".
Meath	Navan Lower	An Uaimh Íochtarach	Divided by 1807	25,835	Named after Navan town. Navan barony present by 1542.
Meath	Navan Upper	An Uaimh Uachtarach	Divided by 1807	17,651	Named after Navan town. Navan barony present by 1542.
Meath	Ratoath	Ráth Tó	By 1542	35,697	Named after Ratoath village.
Meath	Skreen or Skryne	An Scrín	By 1542	40,891	Named after Skryne village
Meath	Slane Lower	Baile Shláine Íochtarach	Divided in 1791	26,224	Named after Slane village. Slane barony present by 1542.
Meath	Slane Upper	Baile Shláine Uachtarach	Divided in 1791	29,211	Named after Slane village. Slane barony present by 1542.
Monaghan	Cremorne	Críoch Mhúrn	1585	84,508	From Irish meaning "border of the Mugdorna"
Monaghan	Dartree or Dartry	Dartraí	1585	59,610	Name from the ancient kingdom of Dartraighe.
Monaghan	Farney	Fearnaigh	1585	67,333	Named from the ancient kingdom of Fernmag, "plain of alders"
Monaghan	Monaghan	Muineachán	1585	69,735	Named after Monaghan town.
Monaghan	Trough	An Triúcha	1585	37,376	From the Irish trícha cét, a unit of territory in Medieval Ireland.
Offaly	Ballyboy	Baile Átha Buí	By 1672	32,398	Named after Ballyboy village
Offaly	Ballybritt	Baile an Bhriotaigh	By 1672	52,378	Named after Ballybritt Castle.
Offaly	Ballycowen	Baile Mhic Comhainn	By 1672	38,610	Named after Ballycowan Castle.
Offaly	Clonlisk	Cluain Leisc	By 1672	49,052	Named after Clonlisk Castle.
Offaly	Coolestown	Baile an Chúlaígh	By 1672	47,866	Named after Coolestown, the former name of Edenderry.
Offaly	Eglish or Fercale	An Eaglais	By 1672	28,697	The name means "church" while Fercale means "men of the churches"
Offaly	Garrycastle	Garraí an Chaisleáin	By 1672	102,841	Named after Garrycastle
Offaly	Geashill	Géisill	By 1672	30,864	Named after Geashill village
Offaly	Kilcoursey	Cill Chuairsí	By 1672	19,274	Named after Kilcoursey Castle.
Offaly	Philipstown Lower	An Daingean Íochtarach	Divided by 1807	30,669	Named after Philipstown, now renamed Daingean
Offaly	Philipstown Upper	An Daingean Uachtarach	Divided by 1807	37,087	Named after Philipstown, now renamed Daingean
Offaly	Warrenstown	Baile an Bhairínigh	By 1672	21,456	Named after Ballybrittain (Warrenstown) Castle.
Roscommon	Athlone North	Baile Átha Luain Thuaidh	Divided by 1868	57,863	Named after Athlone town. North and South not separated in 1871 census. The original Athlone barony existed by 1574.
Roscommon	Athlone South	Baile Átha Luain Theas	Divided by 1868	79,659	Named after Athlone town. North and South not separated in 1871 census. Now also partly in County Westmeath. The original Athlone barony existed by 1574.
Roscommon	Ballintober North	Baile an Tobair Thuaidh	Divided by 1841	30,853	Named after Ballintober town (now in Castlereagh barony). The original Ballintober barony existed by 1574.
Roscommon	Ballintober South	Baile an Tobair Theas	Divided by 1841	48,113	Named after Ballintober town (now in Castlereagh barony). The original Ballintober barony existed by 1574.
Roscommon	Ballymoe	Béal Átha Mó	By 1672	23,287	Half with Ballymoe, County Galway. Named after Ballymoe village, on the County Galway side of the River Suck. The full Ballymoe barony was part of Galway in 1574.
Roscommon	Boyle	Mainistir na Búille	By 1574	81,163	Named after Boyle town
Roscommon	Castlereagh	An Caisleán Riabhach	By 1841	82,081	Named after Castlerea town. Previously one of three sections of Ballintober barony. (Ballintober town is in Castlereagh barony.) The original Ballintober barony existed by 1574.
Roscommon	Frenchpark	Dún Gar	By 1841	71,203	Named after Frenchpark village; previously part of the barony of Boyle.
Roscommon	Moycarn or Moycarnon or Moycarne or Moycarnan	Maigh Charnáin	By 1574	29,595	Now also partly in Galway. A half-barony in 1807. Name means "plain of the cairn", or possibly a reference to Cernunnos.
Roscommon	Roscommon	Ros Comáin	By 1574	81,584	Named after Roscommon town, which is in Ballintober South
Sligo	Carbury	Cairbre	United by 1841	73,685	Divided into Upper and Lower baronies before 1841. Named after the ancient túath of the Cairbre Drom Cliabh.
Sligo	Coolavin	Cúil Ó bhFinn	By 1672	25,473	Name means "corner of the descendants of Finn"
Sligo	Corran	An Corann	By 1672	45,376	Named after Corann village
Sligo	Leyny or Leney	Luíne	By 1672	121,233	Named after the Luighne Connacht tribe
Sligo	Tireragh or Tyreragh	Tír Fhiachrach	By 1672	106,598	Now also partly in County Mayo. Name means "land of the Uí Fiachrach".
Sligo	Tirerril or Tyraghrill	Tír Oirill	By 1672	75,812	Name means "Olliol's land", referring to Ailill mac Echach Mugmedóin.
Tipperary	Clanwilliam	Clann Liam	By 1672	115,755	Name means "clan of William de Burgh"
Tipperary	Eliogarty	Éile Uí Fhógarta	By 1672	90,257	A half-barony (with Ikerrin) in the Down Survey. Name means "Éile of the Uí Fhogartaigh."
Tipperary	Iffa and Offa East	Uíbh Eoghain agus Uíbh Fhathaidh Thoir	Divided by 1807	56,819	Name means "descendants of Eoghan and descendants of Fathaidh"
Tipperary	Iffa and Offa West	Uíbh Eoghain agus Uíbh Fhathaidh Thiar	Divided by 1807	117,175	Name means "descendants of Eoghan and descendants of Fathaidh"
Tipperary	Ikerrin	Uí Chairín	By 1672	69,805	A half-barony (with Eliogarty) in the Down Survey. Name means "descendants of Cairín".
Tipperary	Kilnamanagh Lower	Coill na Manach Íochtarach	Divided in 1838	42,041	Named after Kilnamanagh town
Tipperary	Kilnamanagh Upper	Coill na Manach Uachtarach	Divided in 1838	59,990	Named after Kilnamanagh town.
Tipperary	Middle Third	An Trian Meánach	By 1672	113,544	From trian meaning "third" or "portion"
Tipperary	Ormond Lower	Urumhain Íochtarach	Divided by 1672	127,222	Compare Ormond ("east Munster")
Tipperary	Ormond Upper	Urumhain Uachtarach	Divided by 1672	79,471	Compare Ormond ("east Munster")
Tipperary	Owney and Arra	Uaithne agus Ara	United 1672–1792	85,494	"Owney Mulrian" and Arra were separate baronies in the Down Survey, named respectively after the ancient kingdom of Uaithni and the River Ara. Owney Mulrian formed Uaithne with Owneybeg in Limerick.
Tipperary	Slievardagh	Sliabh Ardach	By 1672	90,772	"Slevardagh & Compsy" in the Down Survey. The name means "high mountain of the Eoganachta".
Tyrone	Clogher	Clochar	By 1591	97,569	Named after Clogher town
Tyrone	Dungannon Lower	Dún Geanainn Íochtarach	Divided by 1851; Dungannon by 1591	42,794	Named after Dungannon town
Tyrone	Dungannon Middle	Dún Geanainn Láir	Divided by 1851; Dungannon by 1591	87,541	Named after Dungannon town
Tyrone	Dungannon Upper	Dún Geanainn Uachtarach	Divided by 1851; Dungannon by 1591	85,995	Named after Dungannon town
Tyrone	Omagh East	An Ómaigh Thoir	Divided 1807–21; Omagh by 1591	132,149	Named after Omagh town
Tyrone	Omagh West	An Ómaigh Thiar	Divided 1807–21; Omagh by 1591	93,321	Named after Omagh town
Tyrone	Strabane Lower	An Srath Bán Íochtarach	Divided by 1851; Strabane by 1591	117,419	Named after Strabane town
Tyrone	Strabane Upper	An Srath Bán Uachtarach	Divided by 1851; Strabane by 1591	121,282	Named after Strabane town
Waterford	Coshmore and Coshbride	Cois Abha Móire agus Cois Bhríde	United by 1831	88,253	Baronies of Coshmore and Coshbride were separate in the 1821 census. The names mean, respectively, "bank of the Munster Blackwater" and "bank of the River Bride".
Waterford	Decies-within-Drum	Na Déise laistigh den Drom	Decies divided by 1746	57,325	Decies south of the Drum Hills.
Waterford	Decies-without-Drum	Na Déise lasmuigh den Drom	Decies divided by 1746	129,894	Decies north of the Drum Hills. "Without" is used with the meaning of "beyond" or "outside".
Waterford	Gaultier or Gaultiere	An Ghailltír	By 1672	29,447	Kilculliheen was formerly a parish of this barony. Name means "land of foreigners", referring to Vikings.
Waterford	Glenahiry	Gleann na hUidhre	By 1672	38,940	Name means "valley of the Nier", referring to the Nier River.
Waterford	Middle Third or Middlethird	An Trian Meánach	By 1672	44,609	From trian meaning "third" or "portion"
Waterford	Upperthird or Upper Third	Uachtar Tíre	By 1672	63,846	Name originally meant "upper country"; probably acquired "third" in name by analogy with Middle Third.
Waterford	Waterford City	Cathair Phort Láirge	1574	532	Formerly a county corporate.
Westmeath	Brawny	Breámhaine	By 1672	10,070	The ancient territory of Bregmaine.
Westmeath	Clonlonan	Cluain Lonáin	By 1672	32,095	Name means "Lonán's meadow"
Westmeath	Corkaree	Corca Raoi	By 1542	23,787	A tribal name, "descendants of Raoi"
Westmeath	Delvin	Dealbhna	By 1542	39,062	Named after Delvin village
Westmeath	Farbill	Fir Bhile	By 1542	35,453	A tribal name: "men of the sacred tree"
Westmeath	Fartullagh	Fir Thulach	1542	37,512	Previously Tyrrells country. Name means "men of the hillock", a tribal name.
Westmeath	Fore or Demifore	Baile Fhobhair	1542	49,056	Half with Fore, County Meath. Named after Fore Abbey.
Westmeath	Kilkenny West	Cill Chainnigh Thiar	1542	31,169	Previously Maherquirke, Dillons country
Westmeath	Moyashel and Magheradernon	Maigh Asail agus Machaire Ó dTiarnáin	By 1672	40,565	Moyashel and Magheradernon listed separately in 1542. They formed the ancient territories of Mag nAssail (Assail's plain) and the plain of the O'Tiernans.
Westmeath	Moycashel	Maigh Chaisil	1542	47,097	Originally the Barony of Rossaughe; before that, Delamares country. Name means "plain of the stone ringfort".
Westmeath	Moygoish	Uí Mhac gCuais	By 1542	39,483	A tribal name: "Descendants of the Son of Cuas"
Westmeath	Rathconrath	Ráth Conarta	1542	48,415	Named after Rathconrath village; previously Daltons country
Wexford	Ballaghkeen North	An Bealach Caoin Thuaidh	Ballaghkeen created 1606; Divided by 1868	45,413	Named for the village of Ballaghkeen (The Ballagh).
Wexford	Ballaghkeen South	An Bealach Caoin Theas	Ballaghkeen created 1606; Divided by 1868	40,986	Named for the village of Ballaghkeen (The Ballagh).
Wexford	Bantry	Beanntraí	By 1672	101,598	Named after the Bendtraigi Laigen, the former ruling people.
Wexford	Bargy	Uí Bhairrche	By 1672	40,002	Named after the ruling Uí Bairrche family, who claimed descent from Dáire Barrach.
Wexford	Forth	Fotharta	By 1672	38,384	A Fortuatha was a kingdom not ruled directly by members of the dominant dynasty of a province. This area was ruled by Fothairt in Chairn.
Wexford	Gorey	Guaire	1606	81,913	Named after Gorey town
Wexford	Scarawalsh	Scairbh Bhailis	1606	106,650	Name means "rocky ford of Walsh"
Wexford	Shelburne	Síol Bhroin	By 1672	51,103	Named after the tribe, Síl Broin, "offspring of Broin"
Wexford	Shelmaliere East	Síol Maoluír Thoir	Divided by 1841	16,363	Named after the ruling people, the Síl Máel Uidir, "Offspring of Bald Uidir"
Wexford	Shelmaliere West	Síol Maoluír Thiar	Divided by 1841	50,299	Named after the ruling people, the Síl Máel Uidir, "Offspring of Bald Uidir"
Wicklow	Arklow	An tInbhear Mór	1606	66,980	Named after Arklow town
Wicklow	Ballinacor North	Baile na Corra Thuaidh	Divided 1832–5	74,109	United barony of Talbotstown created in 1606, and divided into half-baronies for civil law purposes in 1798. Named after Ballinacor Castle.
Wicklow	Ballinacor South	Baile na Corra Theas	Divided 1832–5	78,316	(See Ballinacor North)
Wicklow	Newcastle	An Caisleán Nua	1606	51,938	Named after the village of Newcastle, County Wicklow. Not related to County Dublin barony of the same name.
Wicklow	Rathdown	Ráth an Dúin	1606	33,462	Half with Rathdown, County Dublin. Named after Rathdown Castle.
Wicklow	Shillelagh	Síol Éalaigh	1606	44,348	Named after Shillelagh village. A half-barony in 1807.
Wicklow	Lower Talbotstown	Baile an Talbóidigh Íochtarach	Divided by 1801	86,857	Named after Talbotstown village. United barony of Talbotstown created in 1606.
Wicklow	Upper Talbotstown	Baile an Talbóidigh Uachtarach	Divided by 1801	62,510	(See Talbotstown Lower)

== Former baronies ==
The names of more recently abolished baronies are generally preserved in the successor baronies; e.g. "Massereene" was split into "Massereene Lower" and "Massereene Upper", and "Coshmore" and "Coshbride" were merged into Coshmore and Coshbride.

The Municipal Corporations (Ireland) Act 1840 (3 & 4 Vict. c.108) separated the rural hinterland or "liberties" from some of the counties corporate, restricting their jurisdiction to the relevant municipal town, borough, or city. The Counties and Boroughs (Ireland) Act 1840 (3 & 4 Vict. c.109) provided that the rural area would form a new barony of the adjacent county until the county Grand Jury should decide to allocate it to an existing barony. The reallocation happened quickly in some cases, slower in others, and not at all in three cases: the baronies of Cork and Galway, and the Louth barony of Drogheda.

County	Barony	Created	Abolished	Absorbed/Split into	Notes
Kilkenny	Igrin	By 15th century	By 1672	Ida	Ida was earlier called "Ida, Igrin, and Ibercon"
Kilkenny	Ibercon	By 15th century	By 1672	Ida	Ida was earlier called "Ida, Igrin, and Ibercon"
Kilkenny	Lower Ossory	By 15th century	By 1672	Fassadining	
Queen's County (now Laois)	Upper Ossory	1600	1846	Clandonagh, Clarmallagh, and Upper Woods.	Added in 1600 by letters patent to the Queen's County created in 1556.
Tipperary	Kilnelongurty or Killnallougurty	By 1672	1792–1821	Kilnamanagh, now Kilnamanagh Upper	A "Territory" in the Down Survey; Parishes of Templebeg, Upperchurch, and Doon
Tipperary	Ileagh Territory	By 1672	1792–1821	Kilnamanagh, now Kilnamanagh Upper	A "Territory" in the Down Survey; Parish of Glenkeen and townland of Barracurragh in the parish of Ballycahill.
Dublin	St Sepulchre	1774	1840	Dublin City	Comprising those lands of the Manor of St. Sepulchre and the Deanery of St Patrick previously in the barony of Uppercross and north of the South Circular Road. (The rest of the liberty was within the county of the city of Dublin.)
Dublin	Donore	1774	1840	Mostly Dublin City, partly Uppercross	Comprising those lands of the Liberty of Thomas Court and Donore previously in the barony of Uppercross. (The rest of the liberty was within the county of the city of Dublin.)
Kilkenny	(Kilkenny liberties)	1840	c.1840		Made by the 1840 Act from the portion of the County of the City of Kilkenny outside the borough of Kilkenny
Limerick	(South liberties)	1840	c.1840	Clanwilliam and Pubblebrien	Made by the 1840 Act from the portion of the County of the City of Limerick outside the borough of Limerick and adjacent to County Limerick. The North Liberties, detached between the city and county Clare, remained a separate barony, although the Ordnance Survey and census did not at first record it.
Clare	(Scattery Island)	1840	1854	Moyarta	Made by the 1840 Act from the portion of the County of the City of Limerick outside the borough of Limerick and adjacent to County Clare. Scattery Island was not formally reassigned till a Proclamation in Council of 1854.
Waterford	(Waterford south liberties)	1840	c.1840	Gaultiere, Middlethird	Made by the 1840 Act from the portion of the County of the City of Waterford outside the borough of Waterford. The north liberties became Kilculliheen, although the Ordnance Survey and census did not at first record it as a barony.

The "half barony of Varbo" shown between Trughanacmy and Corkaguiny on the map of the Desmond or Clancarthy Survey of 1598 may correspond to the medieval cantred of Uí Fearba / Hy Ferba / "Offariba otherwise Arbowe", which comprised the castle and lands of Listrim and Ballinoe.

A barony of Drogheda in County Meath is listed in the 1841 and 1851 censuses. The territory included is the portion of the County of the Town of Drogheda outside the municipal borough of Drogheda and south of the River Boyne; this was detached from the County of the Town under the 1840 Act. However, the Local Government (Drogheda and Meath) Act 1845 first recites that this area was in fact transferred to County Louth under the 1840 Act (as part of the Louth barony of Drogheda) and then goes on to transfer the land to County Meath as part of Lower Duleek barony.

== See also ==
- List of Irish local government areas 1898–1921
