= Ferrard =

Barony in County Louth, Ireland

Ferrard Fir Arda (Irish)
- Barony
- Interactive map of Ferrard
- Sovereign state: Ireland
- County: Louth

Area
  - Total: 197.51 km^{2} (76.26 sq mi)

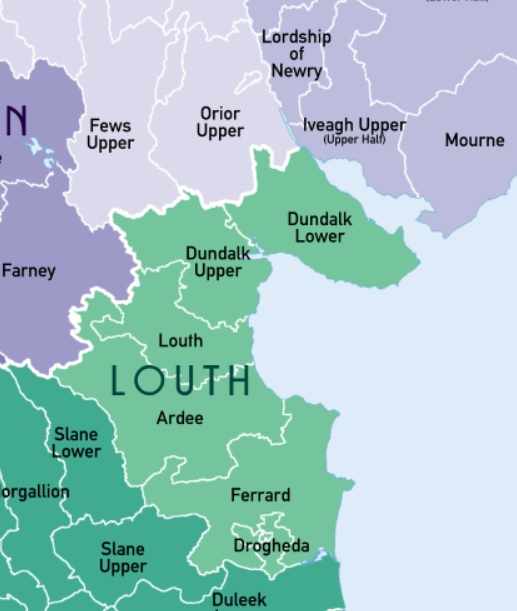
Baronies of Louth

Ferrard (Irish: Fir Arda) is a barony in County Louth, Ireland.

== Etymology ==
Ferrard derives its name from Fir Arda Ciannachta, "men of the high Ciannachta", referring to the uplands around Mount Oriel.

== Location ==
Ferrard is found in south County Louth, between the White River, River Boyne and Mattock River.

Ferrard barony is bordered to the north by Ardee; to the west by Lower Slane, Upper Slane, County Meath and to the south by Drogheda and Lower Duleek, County Meath.

== History ==
Ferrard derives its name from Fera Arda, or Fatharta, the ancient home of the Fir Arda Ciannachta.

== List of settlements ==
Below is a list of settlements in the historical Ferrard barony:

- Baltray
- Clogherhead
- Collon
- Dunleer
- Termonfeckin
- Tullyallen

== See also ==
- Viscount Massereene and Ferrard
