= Middle Third (County Waterford barony) =

Barony in County Waterford, Ireland

Middle Third An Trian Meánach (Irish)
- Barony
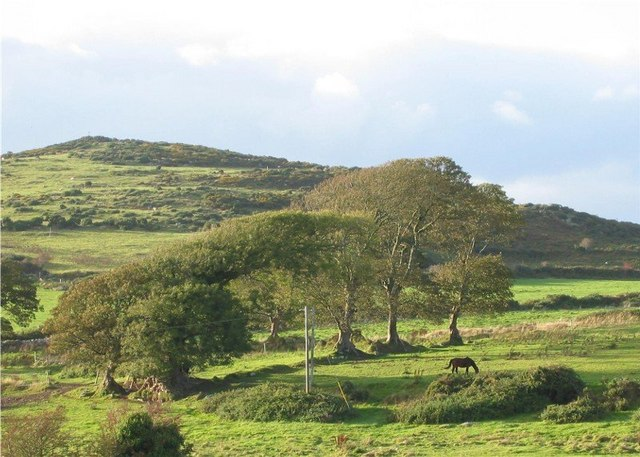
- Middle Third countryside, Ballyscanlon

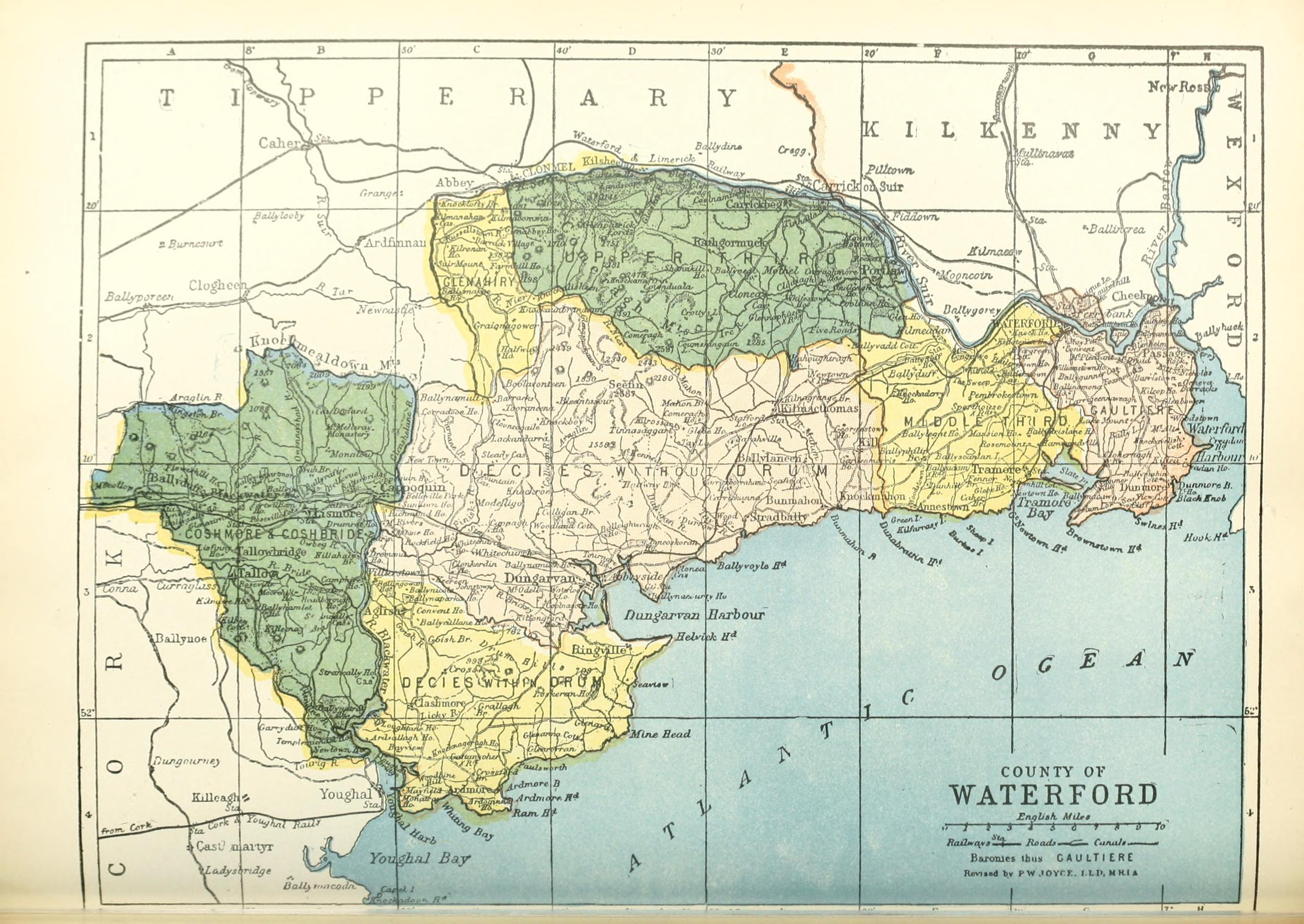
- Barony map of County Waterford, 1900; Middle Third is coloured yellow, in the east.
- Sovereign state: Ireland
- Province: Munster
- County: Waterford

Area
  - Total: 180.53 km^{2} (69.70 sq mi)

Middle Third or Middlethird (Irish: An Trian Meánach) is a barony in County Waterford, Ireland.

== Etymology ==
A "third" (trian) was an old Irish land division of variable extent. The other "thirds" were Upperthird and Gaultier.

== Geography ==
Middle Third is located in the east of County Waterford, south of the River Suir and west of Gaultier. It contains the stretch of coastline from Tramore Bay to Dunabrattin Head.

It also contains Bilberry Rock, site of a feral goat herd for centuries.

== History ==
Middle Third was a barony by 1672.

Some of Middle Third was anciently part of the Viscount Doneraile's estate. The western part formed part of Paoracha, "Powers' Country."

== List of settlements ==
Below is a list of settlements in Middle Third barony:

- Annestown
- Fenor
- Kilmeadan
- Tramore
