= Gaultier GAA =

Gaelic Athletic Association club

- Gaíll Tír CLG
- Founded: 1927
- County: Waterford
- Nickname: The Barony
- Colours: Green and Yellow
- Grounds: Dunmore East to Waterford Road, Ballymabin, Dunmore East.
- Coordinates: 52°09′33″N 7°00′56″W

Playing kits
Standard colours

Gaultier GAA Club is a Gaelic Athletic Association club located on the outskirts of Dunmore East in County Waterford, Ireland. Situated on the west side of Waterford Harbour on Ireland's southeastern coast, the village of Dunmore East lies within the Barony of Gaultier. This name, Gáll Tír meaning "foreigners' land" in Irish, refers to the influx of firstly Viking and then Norman settlers in the area. The club is exclusively concerned with Gaelic football.

== History ==
=== Formation ===
The Barony of Gaultier includes the townlands of Passage East, Ballymacaw, Ballygunner, Killea and village of Dunmore East. The present GAA club, which takes its players from these areas, came into existence through the amalgamation of Ballymacaw Ramblers and Pierce McCann's of Dunmore. Gaultier GAA club was formed in 1927. In 1929, the new club won the county Junior Football Championship.

Through the 1930s and 1940s, Gaultier Football Club continued to grow, though it did not win any significant honours in that period. The club won second junior county title in the 1950s, when Gaultier defeated Valley Rovers GAA in the 1958 Waterford Junior Football Championship.

=== Development ===
In the early 1980s, the underage section of the club took off in a big way. In 1983, the club won the County Under 14B title. In 1990, Gaultier won the County Under 21A title at the expense of Kilrossanty.

In 1988, Gaultier beat Kilrossanty to claim the first Minor A title. This was followed by further successes in this grade in 1989 & 1990. The club had achieved the coveted "three in a row".

The club suffered two County Intermediate defeats at the hands of Tallow and Ballinameela before finally making the breakthrough in 1988. The club was promoted to the Senior grade after victory over Sliabh gCua at Walsh Park on a score line of 5-06 to 2-04.

In 1994, the club reached its first ever senior county final, losing to Nire GAA. In 1996, both the club's seniors and minors contested county finals on the same day. While the seniors went down to Rathgormack, the minors went on to claim another title for the club by overcoming Ardmore by just one point.

=== 21st century ===
The club was relegated from the senior grade after a replay against Ardmore in 2000. For the next few years the club struggled to regain its senior status, coming close on a number of occasions. But, in 2004, the club not only won the county intermediate title but also reached the Munster final, where it played Carbery Rangers.

The club contested two Minor A Finals in 2002 and 2005 losing to Ballinacourty and Stradbally respectively.

In 2003, the club reached an Under 21 A Final losing to Ballinacourty.

The club reached the Munster Intermediate Football Final in 2004 losing to Carbery Rangers. On the way to the final, Gaultier beat Limerick champions Mungret and Tipperary champions Killenaule.

In the club's first season in the Waterford Senior Football Championship, in 2005, they reached the semi-finals only barely losing out to eventual champions Stradbally. 2006 resulted in a similar defeat to Stradbally at the quarter final stage.

The club won the Waterford Junior C football final in 2024.

== Honours ==
- Waterford Intermediate Football Championship: 1988, 2004
- Waterford Junior Football Championship: 1929, 1958, 2012, 2020
- Waterford Under-21 Football Championship: 1990, 2016, 2022
- Waterford Minor Football Championship: 1988, 1989, 1990, 1996, 2016, 2019, 2020, 2022
