= Drogheda (barony) =

Drogheda Droichead Átha (Irish)
- Barony
- Interactive map of Drogheda
- Sovereign state: Ireland
- County: Louth

Area
  - Total: 18.2 km^{2} (7.0 sq mi)

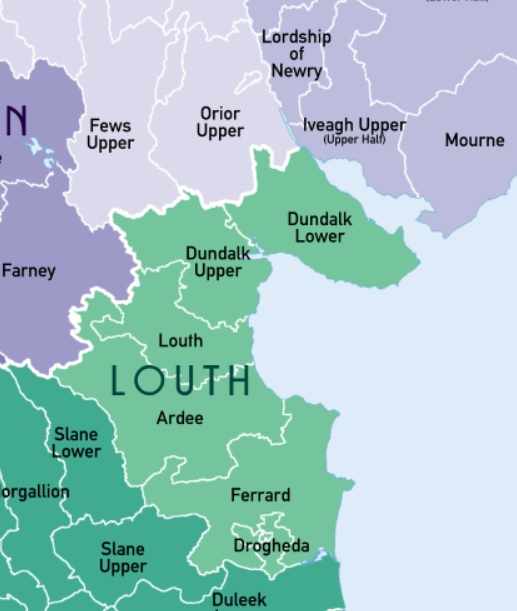
Baronies of Louth

Drogheda (Irish: Droichead Átha) is a barony in County Louth, Ireland.

== Etymology ==
Drogheda barony derives its name from Drogheda (Droichead Átha, bridge of the ford).

== Location ==
Drogheda is found in south County Louth, straddling the River Boyne.

Drogheda barony is bordered to the north by Ferrard and to the south by Lower Duleek, County Meath.

== History ==
The town was officially founded by Hugh De Lacy in 1194, although the Vikings were said to settle here as early as 911. Following the Norman invasion the de Berminghams and Plunketts were among the Earls of Louth.

== List of settlements ==
Below is a list of settlements in Drogheda barony:

- Drogheda
