= Athenry (barony) =

Barony in County Galway, Ireland

Athenry Baile Átha an Rí (Irish)
- Barony
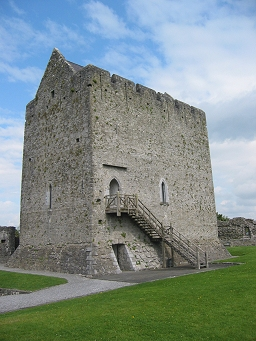
- Athenry Castle

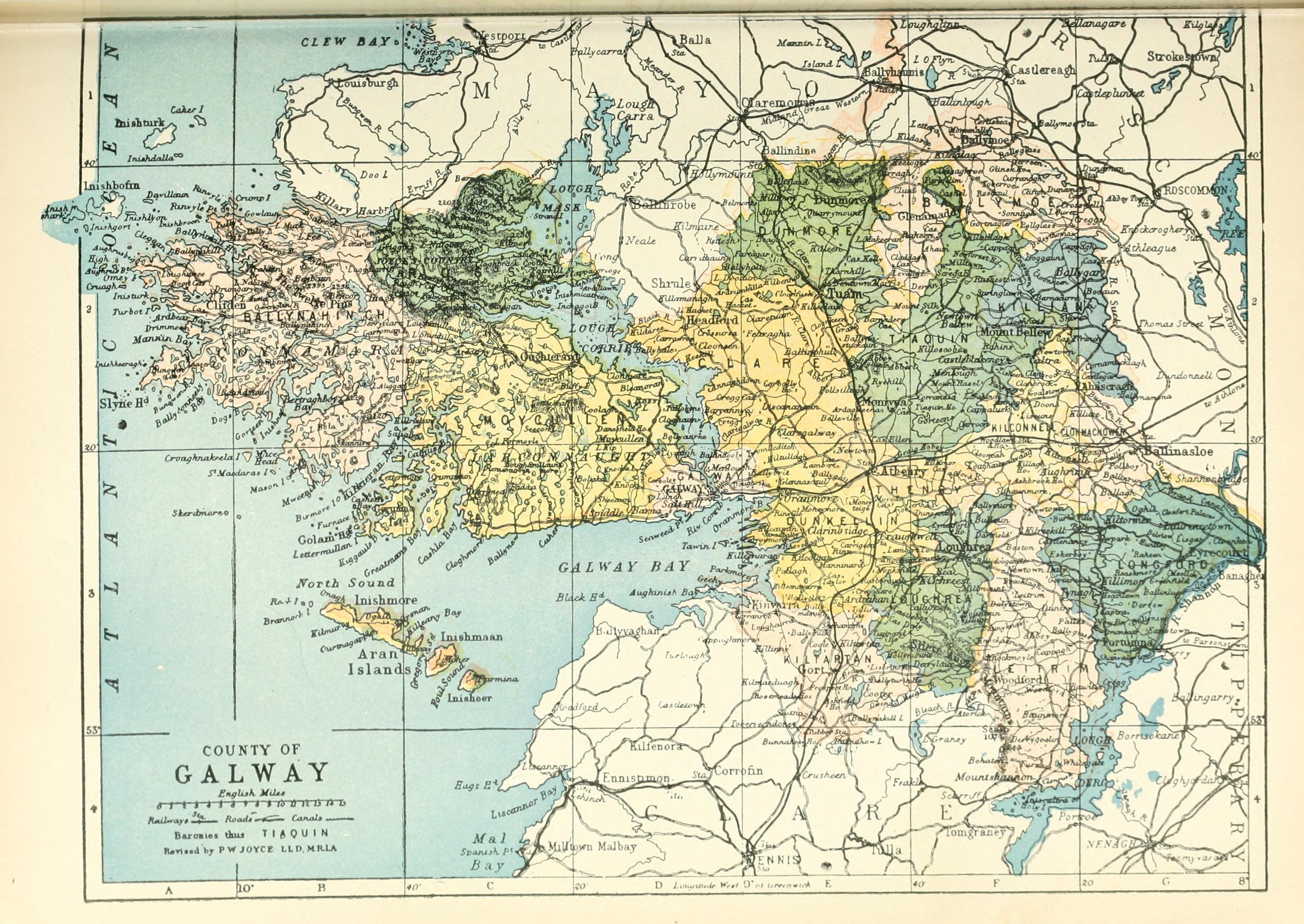
- Barony map of County Galway, 1900; Athenry is in the middle, coloured orange.

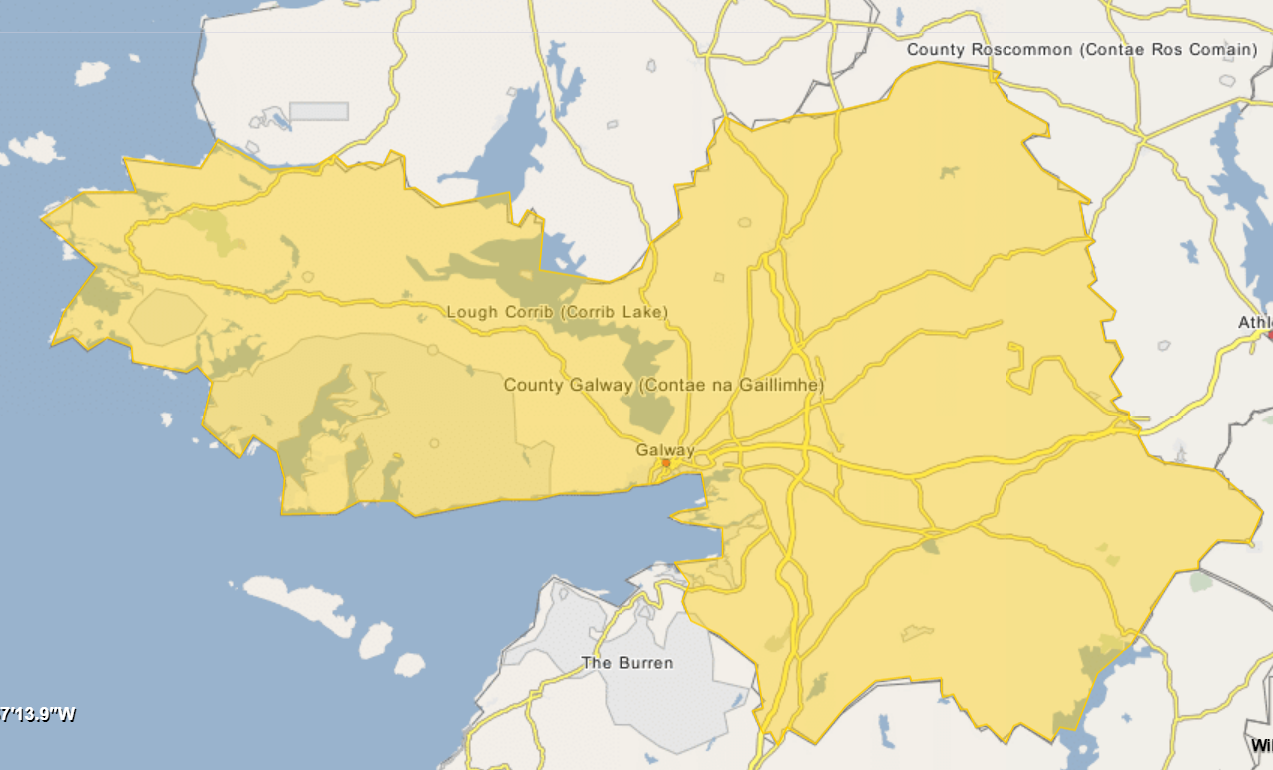
- Location within County Galway
- Coordinates: 53°17′N 8°41′W
- Sovereign state: Ireland
- Province: Connacht
- County: Galway

Area
  - Total: 104.4 km^{2} (40.3 sq mi)

Athenry (Irish: Baile Átha an Rí) is a historical barony in County Galway, Ireland.

Baronies were mainly cadastral rather than administrative units. They acquired modest local taxation and spending functions in the 19th century before being superseded by the Local Government (Ireland) Act 1898.

== History ==
The region was ruled in the Gaelic period by the O'Havertys (Ó hÁbhartaigh, descendant of Abartach).

Athenry's name means "settlement of the king's ford," referring to a crossing of the river Clarin just east of the settlement. It was originally called 'Áth na Ríogh' ('Ford of the Kings') because it was the home area of the Cenél nDéigill kings of Soghan, whose leading lineage were the Ó Mainnín. On some medieval maps of English origin the town is called "Kingstown." Originally, Soghan was surrounded by Uí Maine to the east, Aidhne to the south, and Maigh Seola to the west. However, after 1135, and by 1152, Tairrdelbach Ua Conchobair forcibly incorporated it into the newly created trícha cét of Clann Taidg, ruled by lords such as Fearghal Ó Taidg an Teaghlaigh, who expelled the Ó Mainnín family. After the Norman conquest of Ireland, the area came into the control of the Anglo-Norman De Birmingham family in 1230s. Meyler de Bermingham (d. before 1275) added town walls and his son Peter de Bermingham was the first to bear the title Baron Athenry.

Athenry barony was created before 1672. The Down Survey (1655–56) refers to it as "Halfe Barony and liberties of Athenrey."

== Geography ==
Athenry is in the middle of the county, north of Loughrea, incorporating the famous "low-lying fields" around the Raford River and Dooyertha River.

== List of settlements ==
Settlements within the historical barony of Athenry include:

- Athenry
- Kiltullagh
