= Coshmore and Coshbride =

Barony in County Waterford, Ireland

Coshmore and Coshbride Cois Abha Móire agus Cois Bhríde (Irish)
- Barony
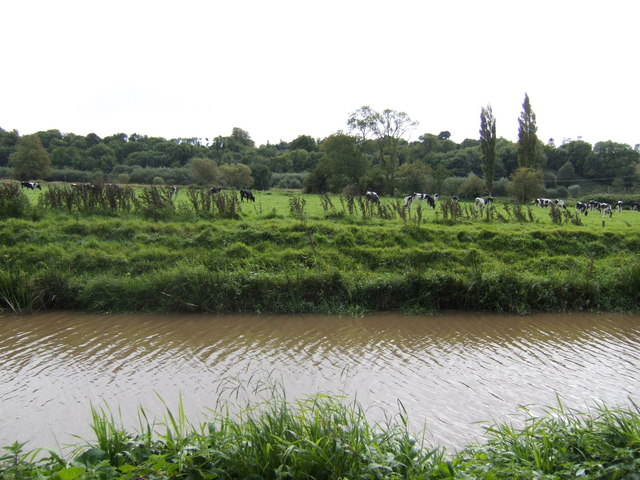
- Munster Blackwater river in Coshmore and Coshbride.

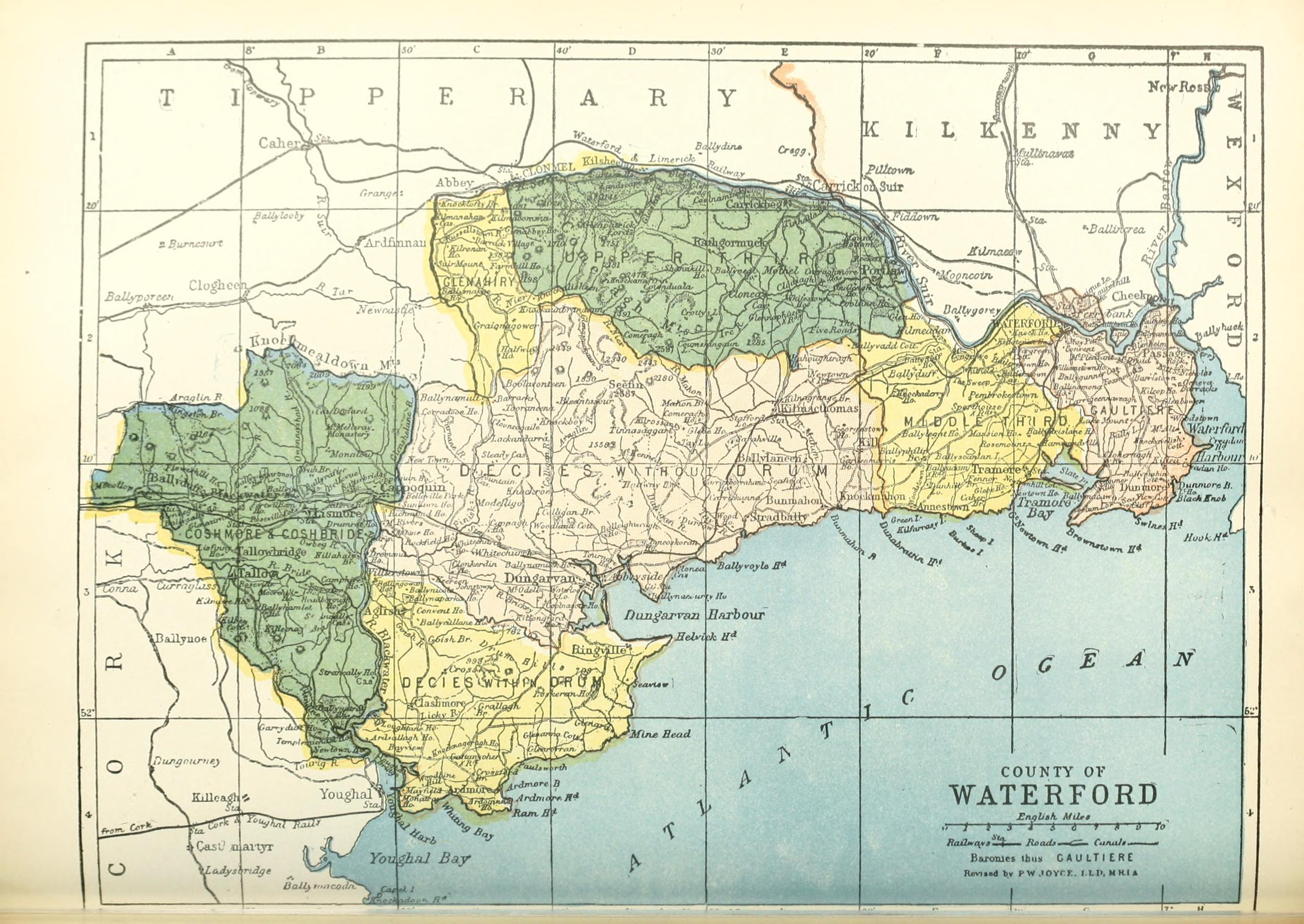
- Barony map of County Waterford, 1900; Coshmore and Coshbride is coloured green, in the west.
- Sovereign state: Ireland
- Province: Munster
- County: Waterford

Area
  - Total: 357.15 km^{2} (137.90 sq mi)

Coshmore and Coshbride (Irish: Cois Abha Móire agus Cois Bhríde) is a barony in County Waterford, Ireland.

== Etymology ==
Coshmore is derived from Irish Cois Abha Móire, "bank of the Great River", referring to the Munster Blackwater. Coshbride means "banks of the Bride", referring to the River Bride.

== Geography ==
Coshmore and Coshbride is located in western County Waterford, to the south of the Knockmealdown Mountains and the River Araglin.

== History ==
The region is the site of the ancient Lismore Cathedral, and was historically the property of the Fitzgerald Earls of Desmond. The Aherns, Barrys, Keanes, Tobins and Walshes were also landowning families.

Coshmore and Coshbride were separate baronies in 1821, but had been united by 1831.

The barony gave its name to the Coshmore and Coshbride Hunt.

== List of settlements ==
Below is a list of settlements in Coshmore and Coshbride barony:

- Ballyduff
- Cappoquin
- Knockanore
- Lismore
- Tallow
