= Ballycowan Castle =

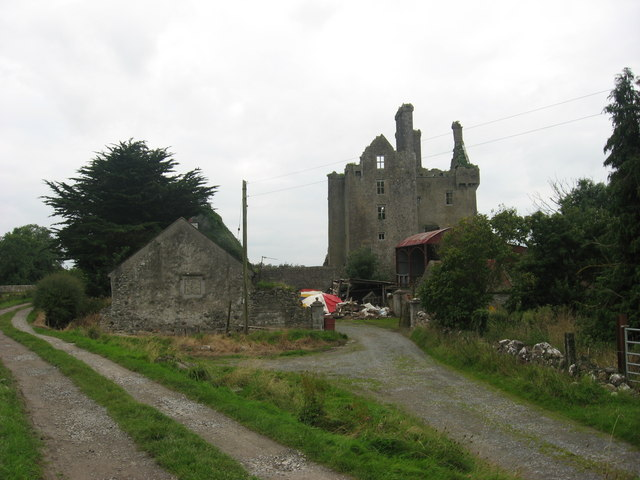
- Ballycowan Castle
- Interactive map of the Ballycowan Castle area

General information
- Type: Castle / Fortified House
- Location: Ballycowan, County Offaly, Ireland
- Coordinates: 53.276419°N 7.558745°W
- Completed: 1589

Ballycowan Castle is a castle located 4 km west of Tullamore, County Offaly. It was built in 1589 as a fortified house by Thomas Morres.

The castle was built on the previous site of the O’Molloy castle or tower house called Baile-mhic-Abhainn which was destroyed by a fire in 1557.

The adjacent tower was built by Sir Jasper Herbert and his wife Lady Jane Finglas in 1626 on land given to them during plantations.

During the Cromwellian period the southern end of the castle was blown up from a hill 100 yards away. The lands on which the castle stood were confiscated and handed over to the Earl of Mountrath in 1666.
