= Duleek Upper =

Barony in County Meath, Ireland

Duleek Upper Damhliag Uachtarach (Irish)
- Barony
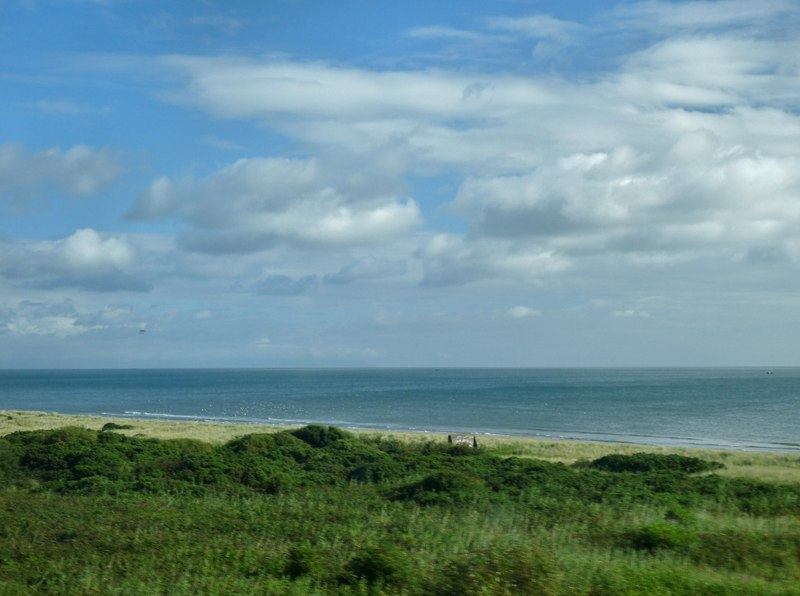
- Dunes on the coast at Mosney

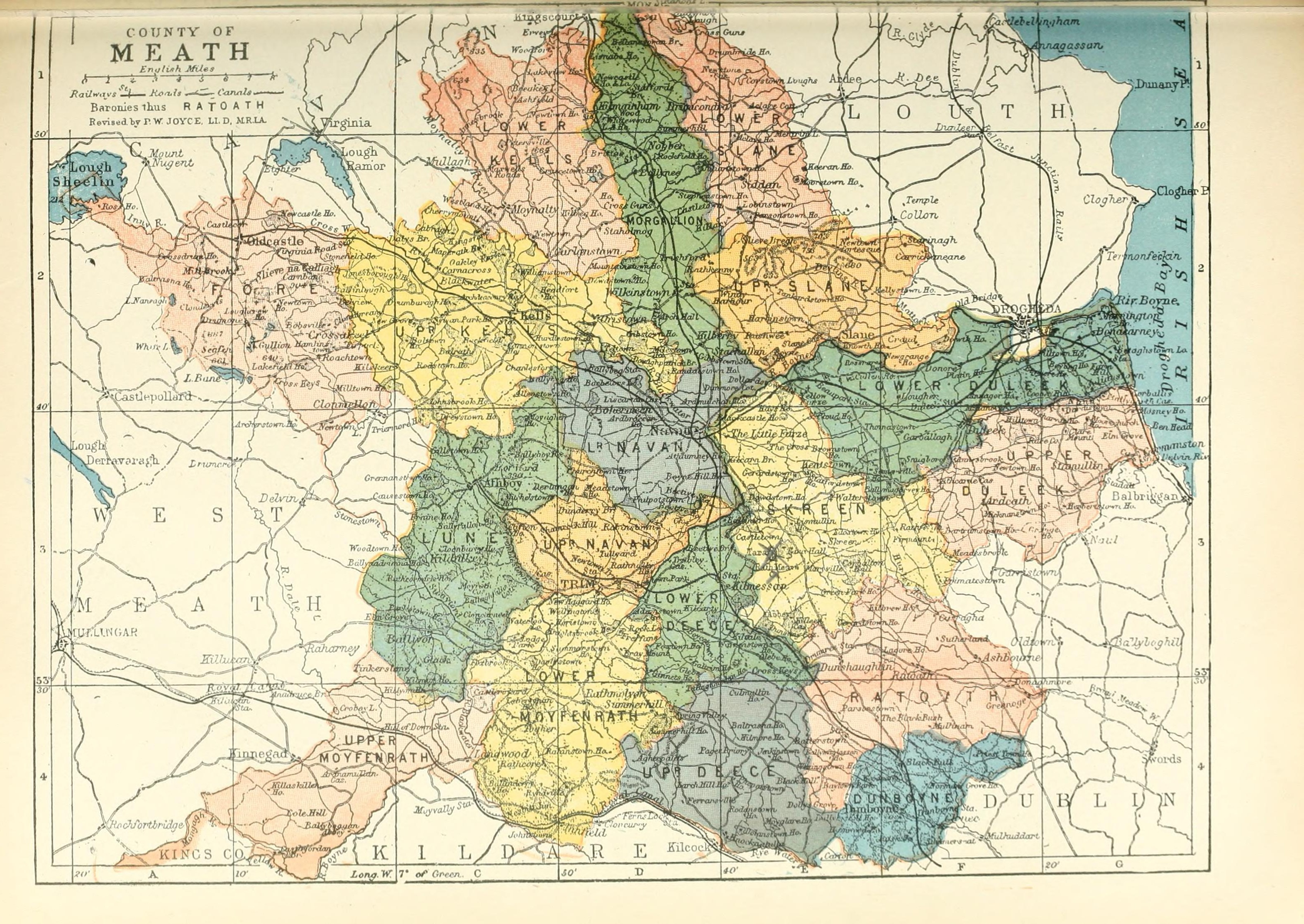
- Barony map of County Meath, 1900; Duleek Upper is in the east, coloured green.

- Location within Ireland
- Coordinates: 53°37′N 6°20′W
- Sovereign state: Ireland
- Province: Leinster
- County: Meath

Area
  - Total: 115.2 km^{2} (44.5 sq mi)

Duleek Upper or Upper Duleek (Irish: Damhliag Uachtarach) is a historical barony in eastern County Meath, Ireland.

Baronies were mainly cadastral rather than administrative units. They acquired modest local taxation and spending functions in the 19th century before being superseded by the Local Government (Ireland) Act 1898.

== History ==
Prior to the Norman invasion of Ireland, the Duleek Upper area was part of the territory of the Ciannachta. The barony of Duleek existed before 1542 in the Lordship of Meath; it took its name from the town of Duleek Duleek was divided into Lower (northern) and Upper (southern) halves by 1807.

== Geography ==
Duleek Upper is in the east of the county, to the south of the River Boyne, and runs up to Meath's short coastline on Drogheda Bay.

== List of settlements ==
Settlements within the historical barony of Duleek Upper include:

- Bellewstown
- Clonalvy
- Gormanston
- Julianstown
- Stamullen
