= Ballymoe (County Roscommon barony) =

Land unit in County Roscommon, Ireland

Ballymoe Béal Átha Mó (Irish)
- Barony
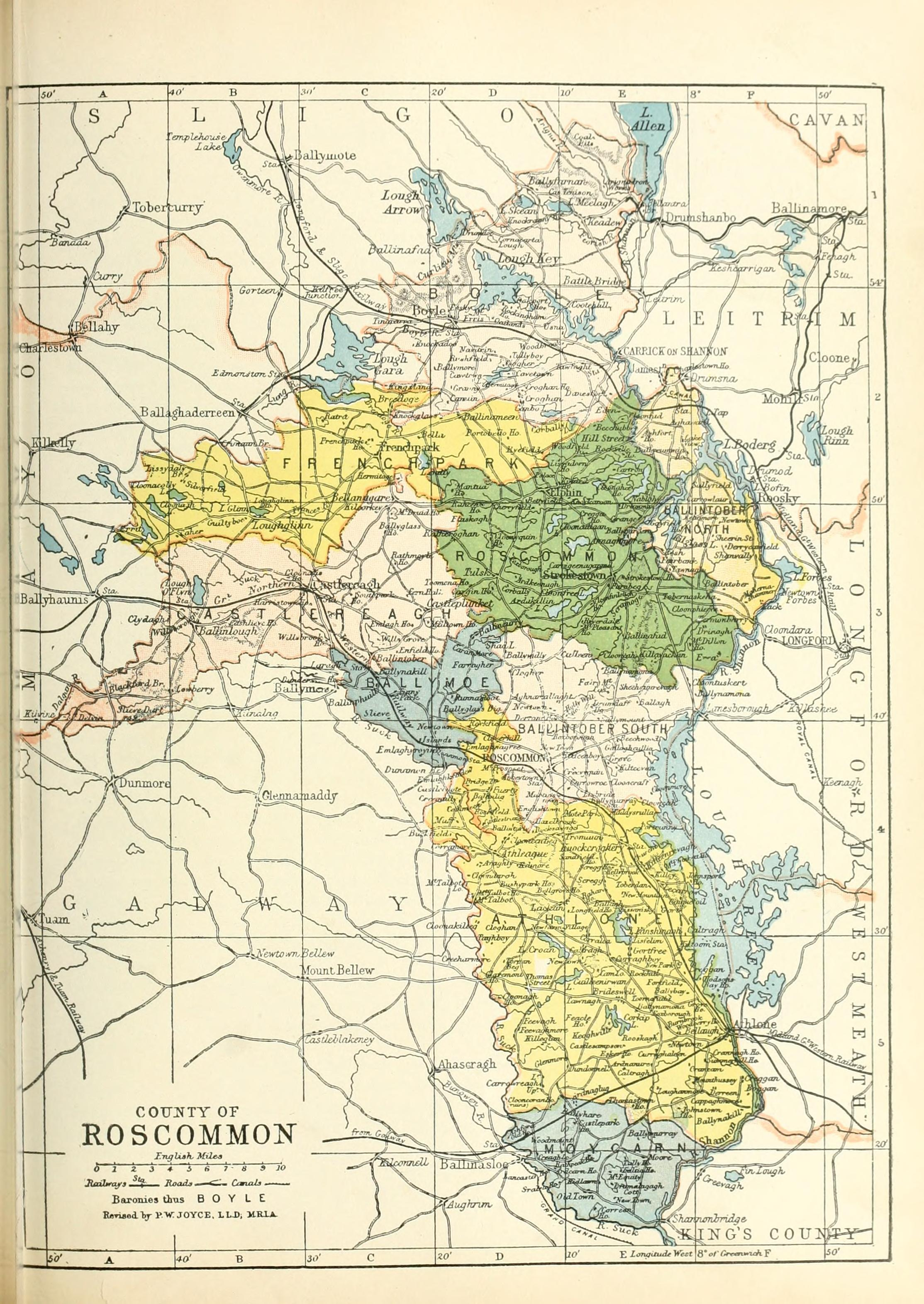
- Barony map of County Roscommon, 1900; Ballymoe is coloured blue, in the centre.
- Sovereign state: Ireland
- Province: Connacht
- County: Roscommon

Area
  - Total: 94.24 km^{2} (36.39 sq mi)

Ballymoe (Irish: Béal Átha Mó) is a barony in County Roscommon, Ireland.

== Etymology ==
Ballymoe barony is named after Ballymoe town, County Galway; the name means "mouth of the ford of Mogh"; Mogh is a legendary figure linked to Queen Medb.

== Geography ==
Ballymoe barony is located in the centre of County Roscommon, north of the River Suck.

== History ==
Donamon Castle is located in Ballymoe; it was a centre of the Ó Fiannachta (O'Feenaghty). Also in this area were the O'Concheanainn (O'Concannon), chiefs of the Uí Díarmata.

There was originally a single large barony, named Ballymoe and part of County Galway. Later, about one-fifth of the barony's area — the part north of the River Suck — was given to County Roscommon.

Richard Malone, 1st Baron Sunderlin (c. 1738 – 1816) was a landowner in the area. It was the site of agrarian trouble in the 1840s.
