= Dunboyne (barony) =

Barony in County Meath, Ireland

Dunboyne Dún Búinne (Irish)
- Barony
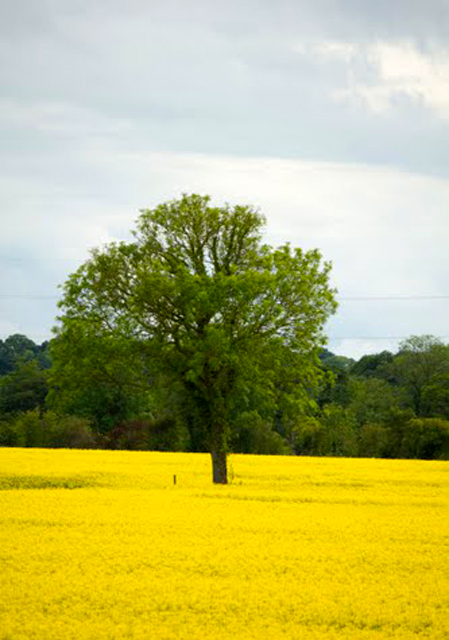
- Field of rape near Dunboyne

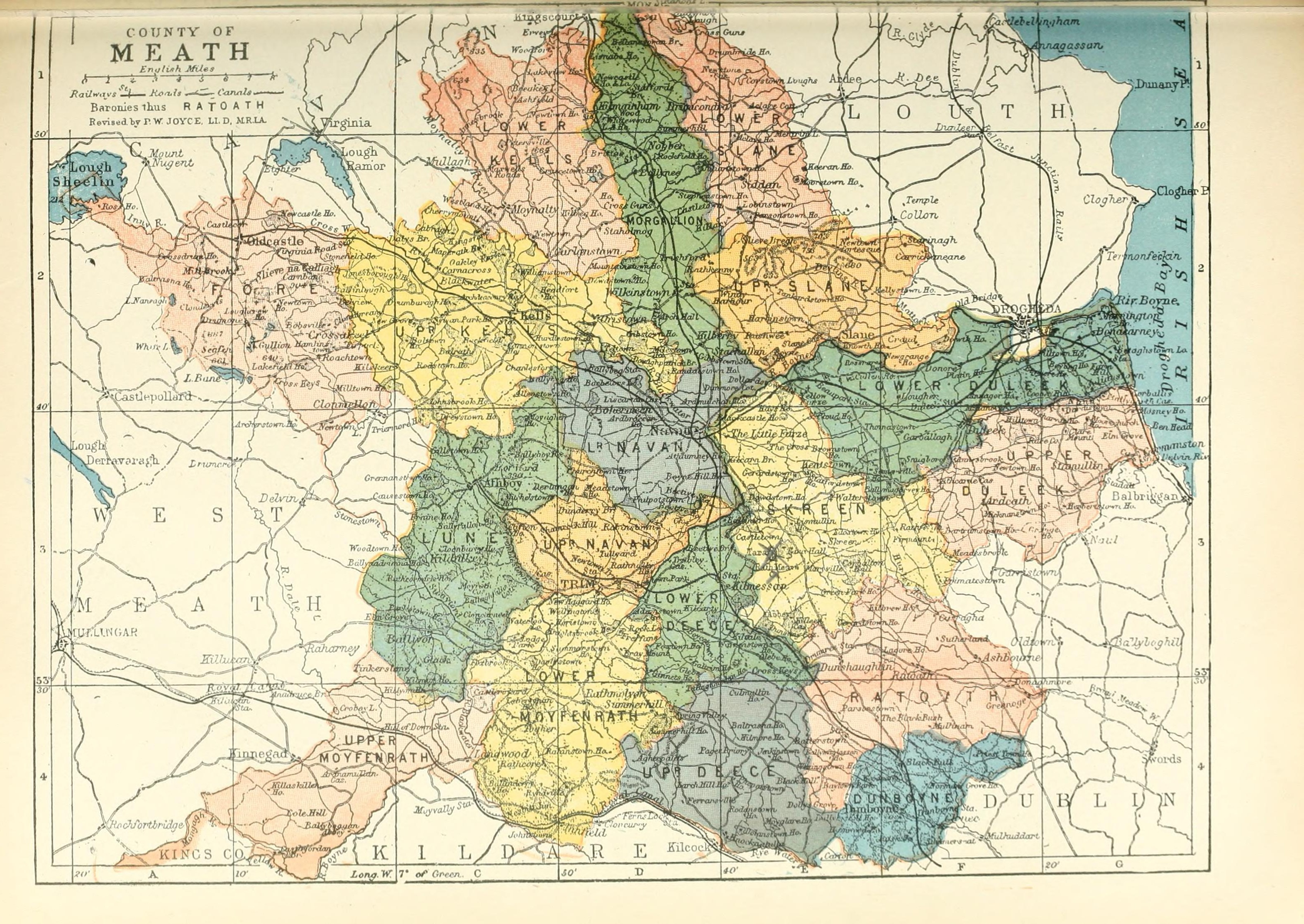
- Barony map of County Meath, 1900; Dunboyne is in the southeast, coloured blue.

- Location within Ireland
- Coordinates: 53°26′N 6°27′W
- Sovereign state: Ireland
- Province: Leinster
- County: Meath

Area
  - Total: 67.9 km^{2} (26.2 sq mi)

Dunboyne (Irish: Dún Búinne, also spelled Donboyn) is a historical barony in southeast County Meath, Ireland.

Baronies were mainly cadastral rather than administrative units. They acquired modest local taxation and spending functions in the 19th century before being superseded by the Local Government (Ireland) Act 1898.

== History ==
The barony takes its name from the town of Dunboyne. In the 12th century this area was ruled by the Ó hAonghusa (Hennessy) of Gailenga Becc. After the Norman conquest of Ireland, the title of Baron Dunboyne was granted to Thomas Butler as an Irish feudal barony in 1329.

== Geography ==
Dunboyne barony is in the southeast of the county, on the border with County Dublin.

== List of settlements ==
Settlements within the historical barony of Dunboyne include two villages, both now with some suburban housing adjacent:

- Clonee
- Dunboyne
