= Upperthird =

Barony in County Waterford, Ireland

Upperthird Uachtar Tíre (Irish)
- Barony
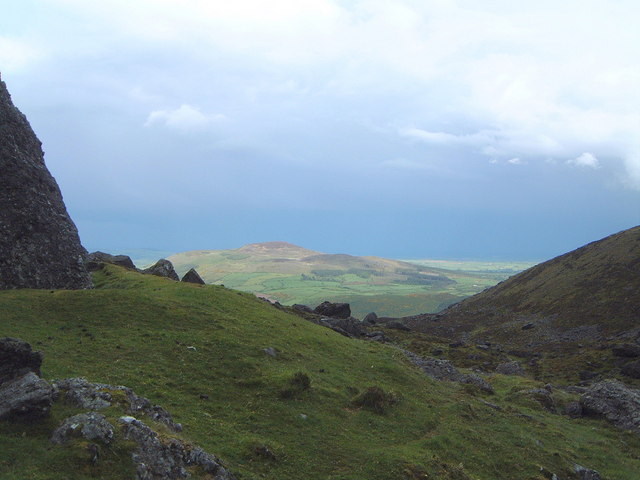
- Boulder field at Lake Coumshingaun, Comeragh Mountains, in the Upperthird barony.

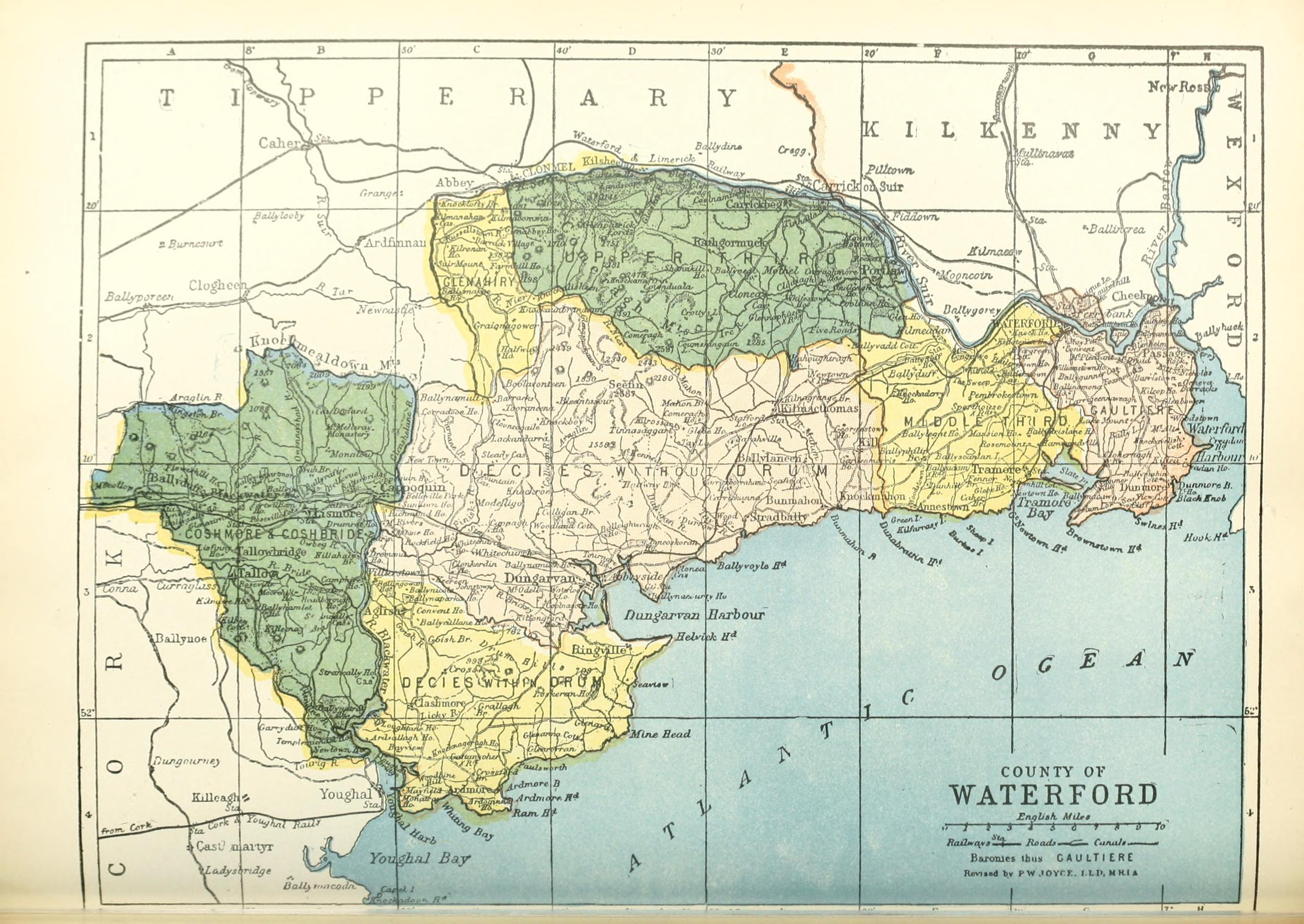
- Barony map of County Waterford, 1900; Upperthird is coloured green, in the north.
- Sovereign state: Ireland
- Province: Munster
- County: Waterford

Area
  - Total: 258.38 km^{2} (99.76 sq mi)

Upperthird or Upper Third (Irish: Uachtar Tíre) is a barony in County Waterford, Ireland.

== Etymology ==
Upperthird was originally called Uachtar Tíre, "upper country", referring to its high altitude (by Irish standards). Tír became "third" presumably by analogy with Middle Third; "third" is commonly used to indicate Irish divisions of land, without any region being actually divided in three.

== Geography ==
Upperthird is located in the Waterford uplands to the south of the River Suir and north of the River Nier, containing most of the Comeragh Mountains and the Clodiagh River valley. It also contains two large lakes, Coumshingaun Lough and Crotty's Lake.

It was known as a source of quartz.

== History ==
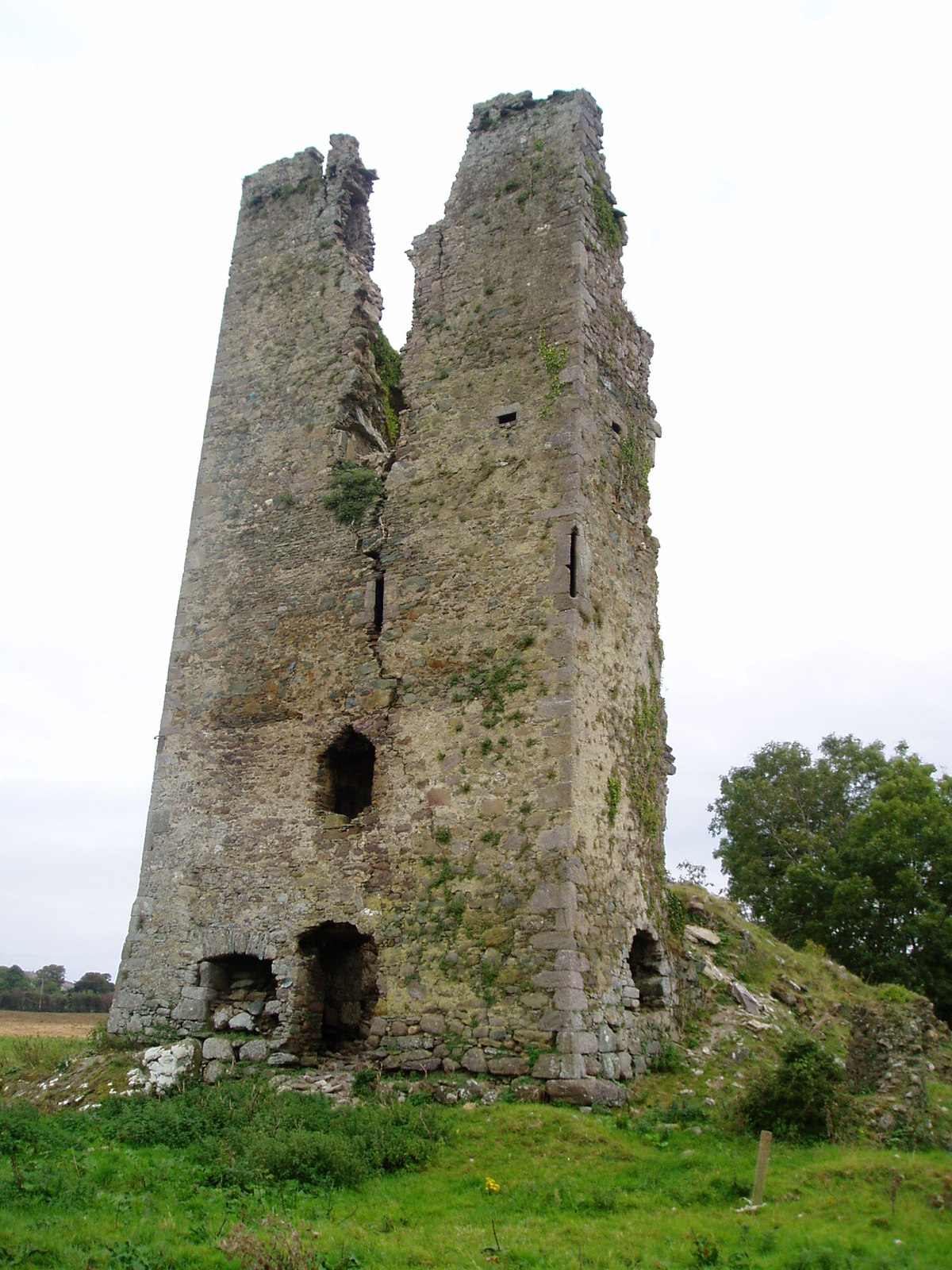
Clonea Power Castle was built by the Power family in Clonea, south of Mothel

This part of the Suir valley was the traditional territory of the O'Flanagan of Upperthird (Ó Flannagáin Uachtar Tíre). It contains Mothel Abbey, an ecclesiastical centre from the 6th to 16th centuries AD.

Abraham Ortelius's map of 1602 shows the land belonging to the Aylward family (an Anglo-Norman surname, in Irish Aighleart).

The barony was seized in the post-Cromwellian confiscations (1652) and formed part of the Down Survey (1655–56). It was granted to the La Poer family, later known as "Power". The region (together with parts of Middle Third) was known as "Powers' Country". The Power family built a number of castles and tower houses in the barony, including Castle Gurteen de la Poer (in Gurteen townland), Glen Lodge (Glen Upper townland) and Clonea Power Castle (Clonea townland).

Upperthird was traditionally productive farmland. The region is famous as the home of Kilmeadan cheddar cheese.

== List of settlements ==
Towns and villages in Upperthird barony include:

- Carrickbeg (formerly part of County Waterford, now moved to County Tipperary as part of Carrick-on-Suir)
- Kilmeadan
- Mothel
- Portlaw
- Rathgormack
