= Gaultier (barony) =

Barony in County Waterford, Ireland

Gaultier An Ghailltír (Irish)
- Barony
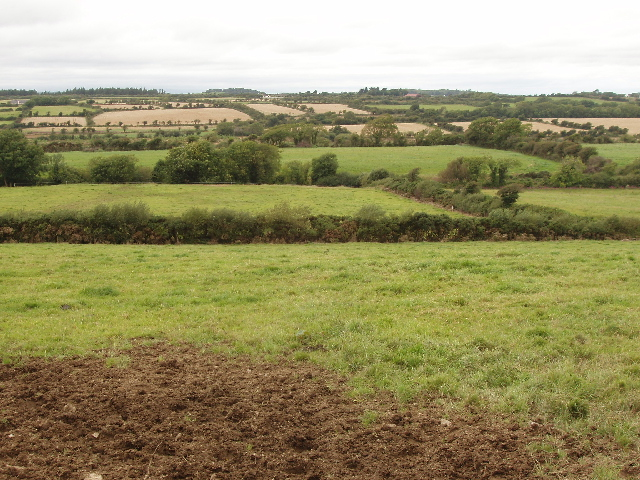
- Pasture and cereal fields near Orchardstown

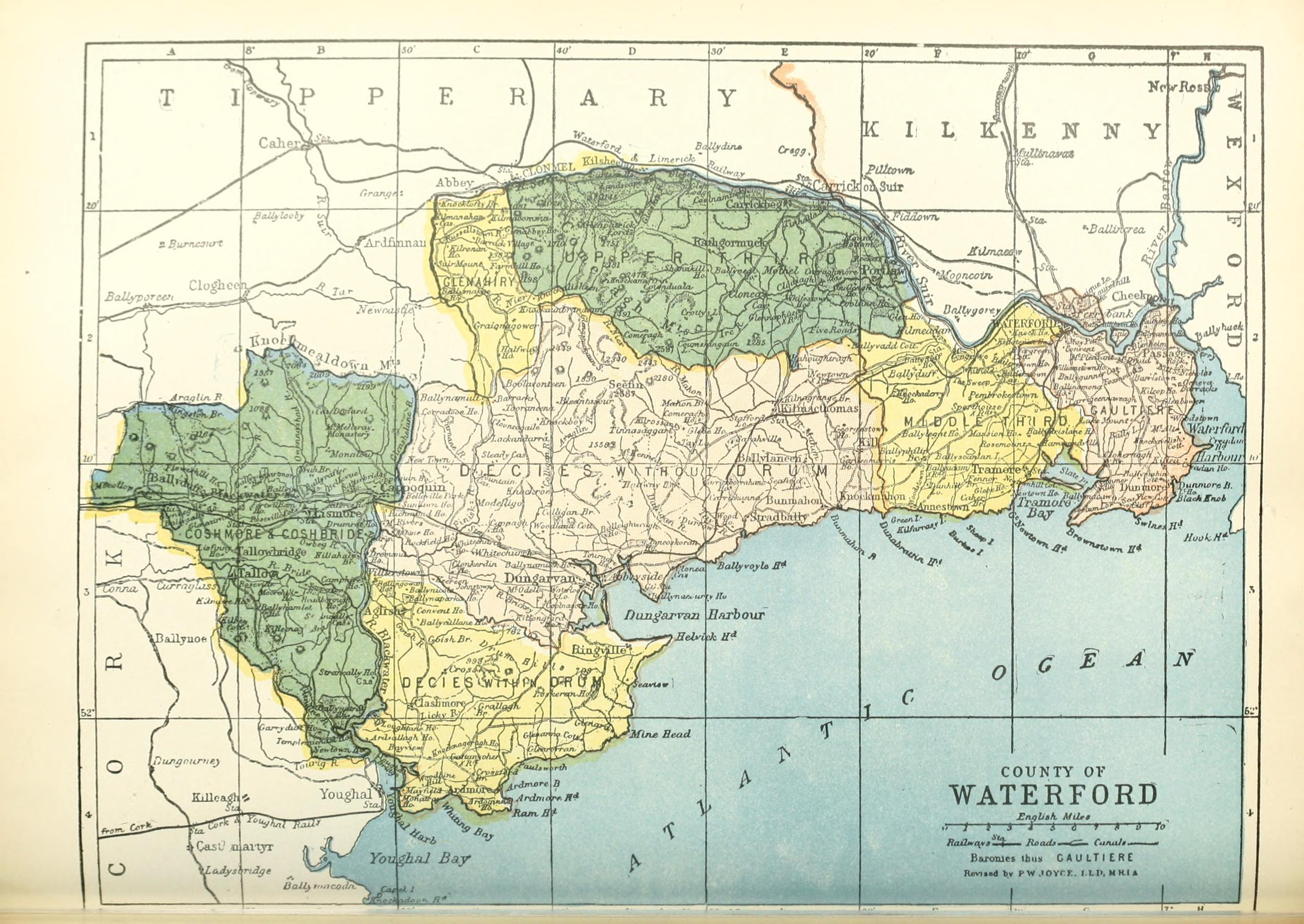
- Barony map of County Waterford, 1900; Gaultier is coloured peach, in the east.
- Sovereign state: Ireland
- Province: Munster
- County: Waterford

Area
  - Total: 119.17 km^{2} (46.01 sq mi)

Gaultier or Gaultiere (Irish: An Ghailltír) is a barony in County Waterford, Ireland.

== Etymology ==
Gaultier barony is derived from the Irish for "land of the foreigners" — specifically, the Vikings, who settled here when they were expelled from Waterford City by the Cambro-Norman and English invaders in the later 12th century.

== Geography ==
Gaultier is located in eastern County Waterford, between Tramore Bay and Waterford Harbour. It contained the parish of Kilculliheen until 1872, when that area was transferred to County Kilkenny.

== History ==
Gaultier, as stated above, was a settlement of Vikings expelled from Waterford city. They established a "Cantred of the Danes" or "Ostmanstowns of Waterford" in 1384.

After the Cromwellian conquest of Ireland, Gaultier was granted to the Lymbery family, and they were for generations landlords and Church of Ireland clergymen in the region. Other important families were Anthony, Brunnock, Comerford, Everard, Grant, Jackson, Mandeville, Sherlock, Wadding and Wyse.

The barony was established by 1672.

It gives its name to Gaultier GAA, a Gaelic football club established in 1927 and based in Dunmore East.

== List of settlements ==
Below is a list of settlements in Gaultier barony:

- Cheekpoint
- Dunmore East
- Faithlegg
- Passage East
