= Duleek Lower =

Barony in County Meath, Ireland

Duleek Lower Damhliag Íochtarach (Irish)
- Barony
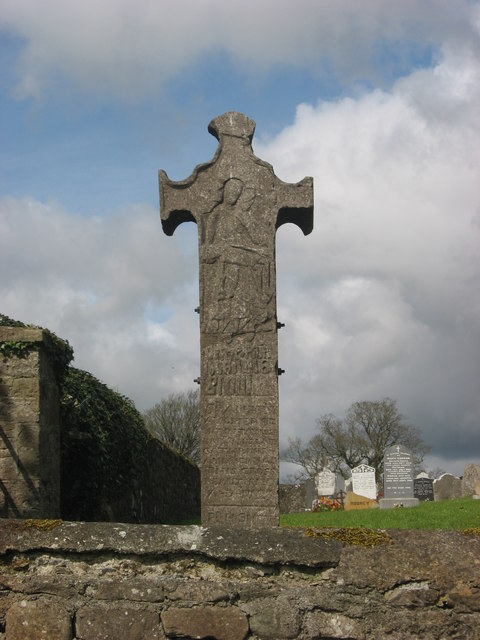
- Balrath Cross

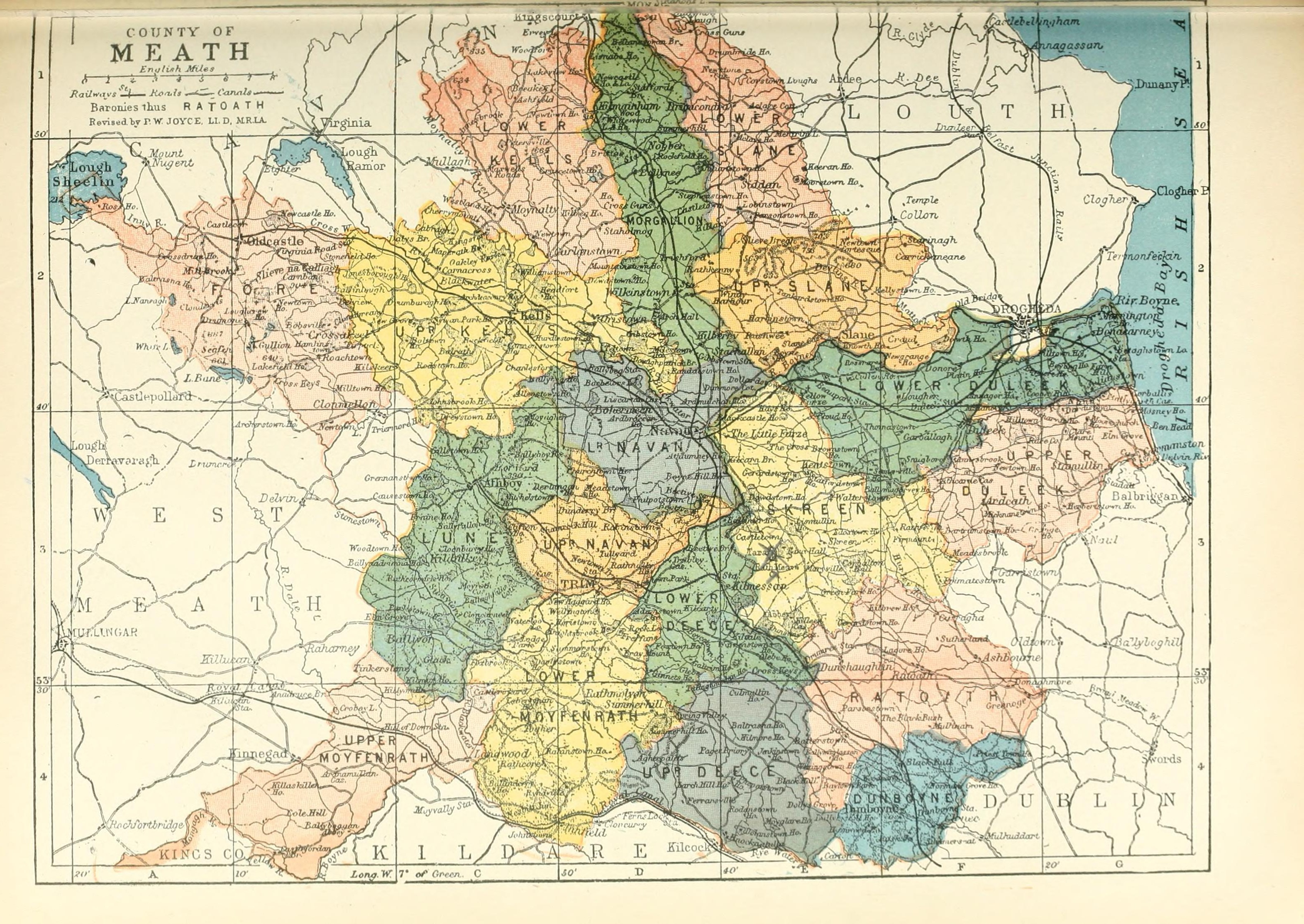
- Barony map of County Meath, 1900; Duleek Lower is in the east, coloured green.

- Location within Ireland
- Coordinates: 53°40′N 6°25′W
- Sovereign state: Ireland
- Province: Leinster
- County: Meath

Area
  - Total: 152.9 km^{2} (59.0 sq mi)

Duleek Lower or Lower Duleek (Irish: Damhliag Íochtarach) is a historical barony in eastern County Meath, Ireland.

Baronies were mainly cadastral rather than administrative units. They acquired modest local taxation and spending functions in the 19th century before being superseded by the Local Government (Ireland) Act 1898.

== History ==
Prior to the Norman invasion of Ireland, the Duleek Lower area was ruled by the Uí Dhubháin (O'Duane) of Knowth (whose name survived in the Downestown townland), and the Ua Maoil Lughdhach (O'Molluwey) of Brú na Bóinne. The barony of Duleek existed before 1542 in the Lordship of Meath; it took its name from the town of Duleek Duleek was divided into Lower (northern) and Upper (southern) halves by 1807.

== Geography ==
Duleek Lower is in the east of the county, to the south of the River Boyne, and runs up to Meath's short coastline on Drogheda Bay.

== List of settlements ==
Settlements within the historical barony of Duleek Lower include:

- Donore
- Duleek
- Yellow Furze
