= 2010–11 All-Ireland Junior Club Hurling Championship =

Championship Details
- Dates: 26 September 2010 – 13 February 2011
- Teams: 28

All Ireland Champions
- Winners: Meelin (1st win)
- Captain: Jerry Forrest
- Manager: Liam Ryan

All Ireland Runners-up
- Runners-up: John Locke's
- Captain: Robert Jackman
- Manager: Bobby Jackman

Provincial Champions
- Munster: Meelin
- Leinster: John Locke's
- Ulster: Inniskeen Grattans
- Connacht: Bearna/Na Forbacha

Championship Statistics
- Matches Played: 27
- Total Goals: 59 (2.18 per game)
- Total Points: 602 (22.29 per game)
- Top Scorer: Éamonn Brosnan (3-39)

The 2010–11 All-Ireland Junior Club Hurling Championship was the eighth staging of the All-Ireland Junior Club Hurling Championship since its establishment by the Gaelic Athletic Association. The championship ran from 26 September 2010 to 13 February 2011.

The All-Ireland final was played on 13 February 2011 at Croke Park in Dublin, between Meelin from Cork and John Locke's from Kilkenny, in what was their first ever meeting in the final. Meelin won the match by 0-12 to 1-05 to claim their first ever championship title.

Meelin's Éamonn Brosnan was the championship's top scorer with 3-39.

== Connacht Junior Club Hurling Championship ==
=== Connacht semi-final ===
25 October 2010 Semi-final	Carrick Hurling Club	Void	Western Gaels

=== Connacht final ===
23 January 2011 Final	Bearna/Na Forbacha	1-12 - 1-09	Carrick Hurling Club	Seán O'Heslin Memorial Park
	G O Sioda 0-4; C O hAinli 0-4, Michael O Sleibhin 1-0, R O Curraoin 0-2, T O Fatharta 0-1, C O hOrgain 0-1.	Report	C Cunniffe 0-5, B Carroll 1-0; J Mc Grail 0-2, J Clancy 0-1, D Deegan 0-1.

== Leinster Junior Club Hurling Championship ==
=== Leinster first round ===
17 October 2010 First round	Wolfe Tones	0-10 - 1-09	Naomh Moninne	Hugh Devine Park
	P Cullen 0-5, B Stakem 0-2, S Hannon 0-1, M Coyle 0-1, A Kelly 0-1.		R Geoghegan 1-4, D Murphy 0-3, O Drum 0-1., E McArdle 0-1.

17 October 2010 First round	Ballyfin	1-12 - 0-12	Moorefield	Ballyfin Grounds

23 October 2010 First round	Newcastle	0-11 - 2-07	Delvin	Parnell Park
	JD O'Brien 0-8, M O'Brien 0-2, P Kavanagh 0-1.		N Williams 2-0, K Murphy 0-4, A Clune 0-2, P Clune 0-1.

=== Leinster quarter-finals ===
31 October 2010 Quarter-final	Ballyfin	0-06 - 0-12	John Locke's	O'Moore Park
	G Lanham 0-4, JJ McHugh 0-2.		O McGrath 0-6, S Burke 0-2, R Jackman 0-1, P Kennedy 0-1, G Shelly 0-1, S Bergin 0-1.

31 October 2010 Quarter-final	Delvin	1-10 - 0-09	Drumree	Cusack Park
	N Williams 1-2, K Murphy 0-2, A Clune 0-2, K Williams 0-1, P Farrington 0-1, G Clune 0-1, B Williams 0-1.		S Doyle 0-4, B Walsh 0-2, B Coughlan 0-1, C King 0-1, D Wallace 0-1.

31 October 2010 Quarter-final	Drumcullen	2-18 - 0-06	Thomas Davis	Drumcullen Grounds

31 October 2010 Quarter-final	Naomh Moninne	1-15 - 1-21 (aet)	Adamstown	Clan na Gael Grounds

=== Leinster semi-finals ===
14 November 2010 Semi-final	Delvin	1-05 - 5-14	Drumcullen	Lakepoint Park
	G Clune 1-0, K Murphy 0-2, N Williams 0-1, B Williams 0-1, P Farrington 0-1.		C Gath 1-8, R Gath 1-2, D Guinan 1-0, H Ryan 1-0, J Troy 1-0, P Gath 0-2, J Cashin 0-1, D Maher 0-1.

14 November 2010 Semi-final	Adamstown	0-10 - 0-11	John Locke's	Taghmon Grounds
	P Whitty 0-8, S O'Gorman 0-2.		O McGrath 0-8, M Holohan 0-2, S Bergin 0-1.

=== Leinster final ===
16 January 2011 Final	Drumcullen	0-04 - 2-14	John Locke's	Drumcullen Grounds
	C Gath 0-4.		O McGrath 0-7, S Burke 1-2, S Bergin 1-0, J Power 0-1, G Shelley 0-1, P Kennedy 0-1, R Jackman 0-1, D Roche 0-1.

== Munster Junior Club Hurling Championship ==
=== Munster quarter-final ===
13 November 2010 Quarter-final	Kilgarvan	0-07 - 1-15	Effin	Kilgarvan Grounds
	M Foley 0-6, K O'Sullivan 0-1.		D Sheehy 1-0, P Carroll 0-3, T Quaid 0-3, D Moloney 0-3, John G Dillon 0-2, N Quaid 0-2, H O'Neill 0-1, L Magner 0-1.

=== Munster semi-finals ===
21 November 2010 Semi-final	Effin	1-10 - 2-15	Meelin	FitzGerald Park
	T Quaid 1-4, P Carroll 0-2, D Sheehy 0-2, D Moloney 0-2.		E Brosnan 2-10, J Forrest 0-2, J Curtin 0-1, S O'Riordan 0-1, W Murphy 0-1.

21 November 2010 Semi-final	Ballydurn	2-13 - 3-13	St. Patrick's	Walsh Park
	P Queally 0-10, A Hubbard 1-1, C Mulhall 1-0, Paul Cummins 0-1, B O'Byrne 0-1.		T O'Brien 1-6, W McCormack 1-2, S Gorey 1-0, C Barry 0-2, R McCormack 0-2, S Horan 0-1.

=== Munster final ===
12 December 2010 Final	Meelin	5-18 - 0-09	St. Patrick's	Mallow GAA Complex
	E Brosnan 1-7, DJ O'Sullivan 2-1, J Curtin 1-2, S O'Riordan 1-1, B O'Sullivan 0-3, John Forrest 0-2, W Murphy 0-1, W Buckley 0-1.		T O'Brien 0-6, S Horan 0-1, W McCormack 0-1, B McCormack 0-1.	Referee: M Wadding (Waterford)

== Ulster Junior Club Hurling Championship ==
=== Ulster preliminary round ===
26 September 2010 Quarter-final	Strabane Shamrocks	0-08 - 0-18	Seán MacCumhaills	Healy Park

=== Ulster quarter-finals ===
2 October 2010 Quarter-final	Seán MacCumhaills	3-16 - 1-05	Clonduff	MacCumhaill Park
	L Henderson 1-8, P Hannigan 1-2, C Matthewson 1-1, M Timoney 0-2, G Cunningham 0-2, J Donnelly 0-1.		C Young 1-0, J Murphy 0-2, A Quinn 0-1, J Lynch 0-1, F Murphy 0-1.

3 October 2010 Quarter-final	Inniskeen Grattans	2-17 - 0-08	Lisnaskea Emmetts	Grattan Park
	M Lennon 2-5, R Meegan 0-9, M Murphy 0-1, D McGahon 0-1, T Hilliard 0-1.		P McGoldrick 0-5, D McGorman 0-1, F McBrien 0-1, B Smith 0-1.

3 October 2010 Quarter-final	Craobh Rua	2-09 - 2-06	Eoghan Rua	St. Oliver Plunkett Park

3 October 2010 Quarter-final	Mullahoran	2-02 - 4-14	St. Brigid's	Ballyconnell Grounds

=== Ulster semi-finals ===
10 October 2010 Semi-final	St. Brigid's	0-18 - 0-15	Seán MacCumhaills	O'Neill Park
	A Smiley 0-5, L Kearns 0-4, C Laverty 0-3, M Devlin 0-3, S Smith 0-1, J McGuckin 0-1, J Doherty 0-1.		L Henderson 0-13, M Timoney 0-1, P Hannigan 0-1.

10 October 2010 Semi-final	Inniskeen Grattans	0-16 - 1-09	Craobh Rua	St. Tiernach's Park
	R Meegan 0-5, M Lennon 0-5, M Murphy 0-3, P Meegan 0-1, T Hilliard 0-1, G Dooley 0-1.		F Bradley 1-4, R Lewis 0-3, C Creaney 0-1, J McEldowney 0-1.

=== Ulster final ===
24 October 2010 Final	St. Brigid's	1-09 - 0-14	Inniskeen Grattans	Casement Park
	J Doherty 1-0, C Laverty 0-3, L Kearns 0-2, R McKinley 0-2, A Smiley 0-1, M Devlin 0-1.		R Meegan 0-9, K Boylan 0-2, M Lennon 0-2, M Murphy 0-1.

== All-Ireland Junior Club Hurling Championship ==
=== All-Ireland quarter-final ===
22 January 2011 Quarter-final	Fullen Gaels	0-08 - 2-15	Meelin	Páirc na hÉireann
	K Codd 0-4, C Maskey 0-2, P O'Brien 0-1, A Gray 0-1.		S O'Riordan 2-3, E Brosnan 0-6, B O'Sullivan 0-2, W Buckley 0-1, J Forrest 0-1, L Collins 0-1, J Forrest 0-1.

=== All-Ireland semi-finals ===
30 January 2011 Semi-final	Meelin	0-16 - 1-04	Bearna/Na Forbacha	Cusack Park
	E Brosnan 0-11, DJ O'Sullivan 0-3, J Curtin 0-2.	Report	G Ó Síoda 1-3, S Mac Fhlannchadha 0-1.

30 January 2011 Semi-final	John Locke's	3-12 - 1-09	Inniskeen Grattans	Cusack Park
	G Shelly 3-0, S Bourke 0-4, O McGrath 0-3, R Jackman 0-2, JP Corcoran 0-1, P Kennedy 0-1, S Bergin 0-1.		M Lennon 1-4, M Murphy 0-3, TJ Byrne 0-1, R Meegan 0-1.

=== All-Ireland final ===
13 February 2011 Final	Meelin	0–12 – 1–05	John Locke's	Croke Park
	E Brosnan 0-5 (5f), DJ O'Sullivan 0-3, B O'Sullivan 0-2, S O'Riordan, J Curtin 0-1 each.	Report	G Shelley 1-0, O McGrath 0-2 (2f), R Jackman, JP Corcoran, PJ Coady 0-1 each.	Referee: O Elliott (Antrim)

== Championship statistics ==
=== Top scorers ===
Overall

Rank	Player	Club	Tally	Total	Matches	Average
1	Éamonn Brosnan	Meelin	3-39	48	5	9.60
2	Owen McGrath	John Locke's	0-26	26	5	5.20
3	Michael Lennon	Inniskeen Grattans	3-16	25	4	6.25
4	Lee Henderson	Seán MacCumhaills	1-21	24	2	12.00
4	Ronan Meegan	Inniskeen Grattans	0-24	24	4	6.00

=== Miscellaneous ===
- A dispute over the eligibility of a Western Gaels player in the Sligo SHC final delayed the Connacht Championship for several months. The dispute, which lasted for several months, went before the Sligo County Board and Connacht Council, before the DRA ruled against Western Gaels.
