= Pat Heffernan =

Irish hurler and selector

Personal information
- Native name: Pádraig Ó hIfearnáin (Irish)
- Nicknames: Heffo, Beefy
- Born: 2 January 1970 (age 56) Kilfinane, County Limerick, Ireland
- Occupation: Secondary school teacher
- Height: 5 ft 11 in (180 cm)

Sport
- Sport: Hurling
- Position: Full-back
Clubs
- Years: Club
- Blackrock → Emmets; Mallow
Club titles
- Limerick titles: 0
College
- Years: College
- 1987-1991: University College Cork
College titles
- Fitzgibbon titles: 3
Inter-county
| Years | County | Apps (scores) |
| 1989–2003 | Limerick | 9 (3-05) |
Inter-county titles
- Munster titles: 1
- All-Irelands: 0
- NHL: 2
- All Stars: 0

Pat Heffernan (born 2 January 1970 in Kilfinane, County Limerick, Ireland) is an Irish hurling selector and former player. He is a former selector with the Limerick senior hurling team. He is currently manager of Mullinahone Senior Hurling team and teaches geography at the Patrician Academy Mallow Secondary School.

An effective forward, Heffernan enjoyed a reasonably successful playing career at club level with Blackrock, UCC and Mallow and at inter-county level with Limerick. He was a key member of the latter team during the 1990s and collected one Munster title.

In retirement from playing Heffernan has become involved in team management. He gained early experience at club level with Kilmallock, Murroe-Boher, Bride Rovers and with his own Blackrock club. He took charge of the Kerry senior hurling team between 2007 and 2008, while later serving as a selector with the Limerick intermediate team. Heffernan was appointed as a selector on the Limerick senior hurling team in September 2010.

== Club career ==
Heffernan began his playing career with his local club Blackrock and enjoyed some initial success. He won a county junior title in the early 1990s, however, after a brief period in the senior ranks Blackrock returned to junior status once again. A move to Mallow in the early 2000s saw Heffernan join the local club there, where he won a junior league title in 2007.

In 2009 Heffernan transferred back to his home club Blackrock where he joined the team as goalkeeper. It was a successful return as Blackrock secured the county junior title that year. Heffernan's club later represented the county in the provincial series of games and even reached the final. Cork champions Fermoy provided the opposition on that occasion, however, it was Blackrock who secured a narrow 1–12 to 0–14 victory and Heffernan collected a Munster winners' medal. An All-Ireland final with St. Colmcille's of Tyrone providing the opposition. Blackrock had little difficulty in disposing of the Ulstermen on a score line of 1–18 to 0–9. Heffernan kept a clean sheet again while also collecting an All-Ireland club winners' medal.

== Inter-county career ==
Heffernan first came to prominence on the inter-county scene as a member of the Limerick senior hurling team in the early 1990s. He made his championship debut in 1991, however, he remained a fringe player for his first few seasons on the team.

By 1994 Heffernan was a key member of the full-forward line and played in his first Munster final. Provincial whipping boys Clare were the opponents and a rout took place. A 0–25 to 2–10 score line gave Limerick the win and gave Heffernan his first Munster winners' medal. Limerick subsequently qualified to meet Offaly in the All-Ireland final. It looked as if Heffernan's side were going to make history and claim the title as Limerick had a five-point lead with as many minutes left. Offaly suddenly sprang to life following a Johnny Dooley goal from a close-in free. Following the puck-out Offaly worked the ball upfield and Pat O'Connor struck for a second goal. The Offaly forwards scored another five unanswered points in the time remaining to secure a 3–16 to 2–13 victory. It was a bitter blow for Limerick who looked as if they had one hand on the Liam MacCarthy Cup.

Limerickregrouped and contested the a second Munster final in succession in 1995. Clare were the opponents once again, however, the roles were reversed on this occasion with victory going to the men from the banner county. Heffernan left the inter-county set up following this defeat. He returned briefly in 2003 at the behest of new manager Pad Joe Whelahan, however, his second coming was short-lived.

== Management career ==
=== Early experience ===
After retiring Heffernan pursued a career in coaching, gaining experience in his native Limerick where he became involved with several clubs, including Kilmallock, Murroe-Boher and his native Blackrock. He enjoyed little success with these early endeavours. In 2007 Heffernan took charge of Bride Rovers GAA Club in east Cork and guided the team to the semi-finals of the county senior championship.

=== Kerry ===
In late 2007 Heffernan was appointed manager of the Kerry senior hurling team for a one-year term. His first season in charge got off to a good start as 'the Kingdom' only lost one game in the group stage of the National Hurling League. This allowed Heffernan's side to advance to the semi-final of the competition, however, Carlow won the game by 1–19 to 3–4. In the subsequent Christy Ring Cup Kerry topped their group and qualified for a home quarter-final against old rivals Carlow. It was one of the toughest draws and, in spite of home advantage, Kerry were heavily defeated by 2–4 to 1–14.

Heffernan failed to secure silverware but was reappointed as manager for a second season at the end of 2008. This reappointment was short-lived as Heffernan subsequently stepped down before the start of the season citing personal reasons.

=== St. Brendan's Ardfert ===
In 2010 Heffernan was appointed trainer of the St. Brendan's Ardfert Club in County Kerry. He managed them to the semi-final stage of the County Championship where St. Brendan's were defeated by Ballyduff.

=== Mallow ===
In 2010 Heffernan took charge of the Mallow Intermediate Hurling Team. After initial success with a victory over Castlelyons in the Championship, Heffernan's side were defeated in the second round. In the 2011 Heffernan was appointed as the Mallow U21 Hurling Manager.

=== Limerick ===
In September 2010 Heffernan was named as a selector along with former teammates Ciarán Carey and T. J. Ryan in Dónal O'Grady's new management team to oversee the Limerick Senior Hurling Team for 2011.

=== Mullinahone ===
In 2012 he was appointed manager of Mullinahone Senior Hurling Team.

== Honours ==
=== Player ===
St Flannan's College

- Dr Croke Cup (1): 1987
- Dr Harty Cup (1): 1987

University College Cork

- Fitzgibbon Cup (2): 1987, 1990, 1991 (c)

Blackrock

- Limerick Intermediate Hurling Championship (1): 1993
- All-Ireland Junior Club Hurling Championship (1): 2010
- Munster Junior Club Hurling Championship (1): 2009
- Limerick Junior Hurling Championship (1): 2009

Limerick

- Munster Senior Hurling Championship (1): 1994
- National Hurling League (2): 1991–92, 1997

=== Management ===
Dromin/Athlacca GAA

- Limerick Junior Hurling Championship (1): 1995

Garryspillane

- Limerick Intermediate Hurling Championship (1): 1996

Golden-Kilfeacle

- Tipperary Under-21 A Hurling Championship: (1) 1998
- West Tipperary Under-21 A Hurling Championship: (1) 1998

Cappawhite

- West Tipperary Senior Hurling Championship (2): 2000, 2001

Golden-Annacotty

- West Tipperary Senior Hurling Championship (1): 2004

Killavullen

- North Cork Junior A Hurling Championship (1): 2024

Limerick

- National Hurling League Division 2 (1): 2011

Sporting positions
| Preceded by Maurice Leahy | Kerry Senior Hurling Manager; 2007–2008 | Succeeded by Mossie Carroll |
