= Fintan O'Leary =

Irish hurler

Personal information
- Native name: Fiontán Ó Laoire (Irish)
- Born: 1 September 1986 (age 40) Ballinhassig, County Cork, Ireland

Sport
- Sport: Hurling
- Position: Forward
Clubs
- Years: Club
- Ballinhassig; Carrigdhoun
Club titles
- Cork titles: 0
College
- Years: College
- 2005-2011: Waterford Institute of Technology
College titles
- Fitzgibbon titles: 2
Inter-county*
Years	County	Apps (scores)
2008-2010	Cork	2 (0-00)
Inter-county titles
- Munster titles: 2
- All-Irelands: 2
- NHL: 0
- All Stars: 0
- *Inter County team apps and scores correct as of 20:35, 24 July 2018.

Fintan O'Leary (born 1 September 1986) is an Irish hurler who plays for club side Ballinhassig and is a former player with divisional side Carrigdhoun and at inter-county level with the Cork senior hurling team.

== Career ==
=== Ballinhassig ===
O'Leary first played with Ballinhassig at a young age with success at underage after winning a Under-14 South-East Hurling Championship title in 2000 and the same year they got to the Under-14 "B" County Final, but lost to Kanturk 4–09 to 3–10 after a last gasp score.

2 years later at the age of 16 O'Leary won a South-East Minor Hurling title and went on County Minor "A" title after beating Doneraile played in Páirc Uí Rinn. O'Leary was also playing with the adults top team in a memorable year to never for get. The side won: South-East, Cork, Munster and All-Ireland Junior titles. O'Leary's side quickly won a 2005 Premier Intermediate Hurling title after beating Aghada 1–16 to 1-11 played in Páric Uí Choaimh with O'Leary scoring 1-02. O'Leary was injured at the time when the club won the Munster Intermediate Club title played in Fermoy GAA Grounds beating Ballyduff Upper 1–12 to 0-13 which gave O'Leary a second Munster club medal.

O'Leary's side failed by the skin of there teeth to lose the 2006 All-Ireland Intermediate Club final to Dicksboro of Kilkenny City on a scoreline of 2–13 to 1–13 after a late a goal by the Dicksboro substitute Alan McIntyre who kicked the slithor into the goal that just got in by fractions going through the net by the bottom-right corner by the left of the post to give "the cats" side the winning goal.

The side went up Senior and the first Senior game the club played since 1976, forced a replay against Na Piarsaigh and went on to beat them 1–16 to 0–15.

They then won Senior League titles in 2007 and 2008 but then got relegated from Senior in 2011, however the next year they once again they won the Premier Intermediate Championship in 2012 after beating Bandon 1–19 to 1-15 played in Pairc Uí Choaimh. In the same year the club won its first-ever South-East Junior Football Championship after beating Tracton in a replay in Carrigaline after a Michael Sheehan "Golden Goal" to win the game went on to win the same competition in 2015, 2019 and 2021 also coming Runners-Up to Boherbue in the County Final in 2021.

== Honours ==
Waterford Institute of Technology

- Fitzgibbon Cup (2): 2006, 2008

Ballinhassig

- Munster Intermediate Club Hurling Championship (1): 2005
- Cork Premier Intermediate Hurling Championship (2): 2005, 2012
- All-Ireland Junior Club Hurling Championship (1): 2003
- Munster Junior Club Hurling Championship (1): 2002
- Cork Junior Hurling Championship (1): 2002
- South East Junior A Hurling Championship (1): 2002

Cork

- All-Ireland Intermediate Hurling Championship (1): 2006
- Munster Intermediate Hurling Championship (2): 2006, 2015
- Munster Under-21 Hurling Championship (1): 2007
- Munster Minor Hurling Championship (1): 2004
