= 2013–14 All-Ireland Junior Club Hurling Championship =

Championship Details
- Dates: 29 September 2013 - 15 February 2014
- Teams: 30

All Ireland Champions
- Winners: Creggan Kickhams (1st win)
- Captain: Stephen Colgan
- Manager: Thomas McCann

All Ireland Runners-up
- Runners-up: Ballysaggart
- Captain: Eugene O'Brien
- Manager: Adrian Meagher

Provincial Champions
- Munster: Ballysaggart
- Leinster: Ballinamere
- Ulster: Creggan Kickhams
- Connacht: Calry/St. Joseph's

Championship Statistics
- Matches Played: 30
- Total Goals: 95 (3.16 per game)
- Total Points: 701 (23.36 per game)
- Top Scorer: Stephen Bennett (7-39)

The 2013–14 All-Ireland Junior Club Hurling Championship was the 11th staging of the All-Ireland Junior Club Hurling Championship since its establishment by the Gaelic Athletic Association. The championship ran from 29 September 2013 to 15 February 2014.

The All-Ireland final was played on 15 February 2014 at Cusack Park in Mullingar, between Creggan Kickhams from Antrim and Ballysaggart from Waterford, in what was their first ever meeting in the final. Creggan Kickhams won the match, after a replay, by 1-11 to 1-07 to claim their first ever championship title.

Ballysaggart's Stephen Bennett was the championship's top scorer with 7-39.

== Connacht Junior Club Hurling Championship ==
=== Connacht semi-final ===
| 28 October 2013 Semi-final | Calry/St. Joseph's | 5-14 - 0-08 | Cluainín Iomáint | Markievicz Park |
| | K Raymond (1-8), K Gilmartin (2-1), D Collery (1-1), R Cox (1-0), C Griffin (0-2), E McCarthy (0-2). | Report | G O’Hagan (0-4), M Dolan (0-1), K Clerkin (0-1), N McLoughlin (0-1), C O’Hagan (0-1). |

=== Connacht final ===
| 16 November 2013 Final | Calry/St. Joseph's | 2-12 - 2-10 | An Spidéal | Connacht GAA Centre |
| | K Raymond 0-5, E McCarthy 1-1, K Gilmartin 1-1, C Griffin 0-3, D Burke 0-2. | Report | F Ó Mainín 0-10, S Ó Curraoin 1-0, C Breathnach 1-0. |

== Leinster Junior Club Hurling Championship ==
=== Leinster first round ===
| 19 October 2013 First round | Blackhall Gaels | 0-08 - 3-14 | Setanta | St. Loman's Park |
| | D Carty 0-4, J Meyler 0-2, T Murphy 0-1, S Morris 0-1. | Report | L O Ceallaigh 0-9, A Ceitinn 1-3, F McGibb 1-2, D Breathnoch 1-0. |

| 19 October 2013 First round | Ringtown | 0-03 - 0-09 | Éire Óg Greystones | Ringtown Grounds |
| | E Corrigan 0-1, S Brophy 0-1, J Hardman 0-1. | | S Kelly 0-2, J Tanner 0-2, A Byrne 0-2, J Cranley 0-2, S Nolan 0-1. |

| 20 October 2013 First round | Enniscorthy Shamrocks | 0-10 - 1-10 | Ballinamere | St. Patrick's Park |
| | | Report |

=== Leinster quarter-finals ===
| 3 November 2013 Quarter-final | Setanta | 1-10 - 3-15 | Carlow Town | Parnells Grounds |
| | | | C Clancy 2-6, V O'Toole 1-0, K English 0-4, A McKenzie 0-2, D Hayden 0-1, C Lawlor 0-1, R Moore 0-1. |

| 3 November 2013 Quarter-final | Ballinamere | 0-22 - 0-05 | Sarsfields | Ballinamare Grounds |
| | | Report |

| 3 November 2013 Quarter-final | Éire Óg Greystones | 2-21 - 0-15 | Pearse Óg | Greystones Grounds |
| | J Cranley 2-7, S Nolan 0-4, A Byrne 0-4, M Walsh 0-2, S Chester-Kelly 0-2, B Cuddihy 0-1, P Byrne 0-1. |

| 3 November 2013 Quarter-final | Shanahoe | 0-14 - 3-26 | Lisdowney | O'Moore Park |
| | L Bergin 0-9, F Bowe 0-3, A Kirwan 0-1, D Cripps 0-1. | | P Bowden 3-1, R Hickey 0-7, A Fogarty 0-7, E Kenny 0-6, L Carroll 0-2, E Hickey 0-2, M Kenny 0-1. |

=== Leinster semi-finals ===
| 17 November 2013 Semi-final | Ballinamere | 3-14 - 1-06 | Éire Óg Greystones | Ballinamere Grounds |
| | S Weir 2-3, P Murphy 0-8, N Minnock 1-0, J McKeogh 0-1, M Óg Buggy 0-1, M Murphy 0-1. | | P Byrne 1-0, J Cranley 0-2, M Barden 0-2, A Byrne 0-1, S Kelly 0-1. |

| 17 November 2013 Semi-final | Carlow Town | 0-07 - 5-16 | Lisdowney | Dr. Cullen Park |
| | C Clancy (0-6); K English, P McElligott (0-1 each). | Report | R Hickey (1-5); P Bowden, M Kenny (2-0 each); E Kenny (0-4); E Hickey (0-3); A Fogarty (0-2); L Carroll, E Delahunty (0-1 each). |

=== Leinster final ===
| 1 December 2013 Final | Ballinamare | 2-08 - 0-13 | Lisdowney | O'Connor Park |
| | S Weir 1-4, P Murphy 1-3, J McKeogh 0-1. | | R Hickey 0-6, L Carroll 0-2, A Fogarty 0-2, P Bergin 0-1, K Sweeney 0-1, E Kenny 0-1. |

== Munster Junior Club Hurling Championship ==
=== Munster quarter-final ===
| 10 November 2013 Quarter-final | Feenagh-Kilmeedy | 2-08 - 0-09 | Kenmare Shamrocks | Feenagh |
| | L Lynch, E Murphy (free) 1-0 each, J O’Gorman 0-3, D Coleman (0-1 free), G O’Gorman 0-2 each, J Gaffney 0-1. | Report | J Duncan 0-5 (all frees), P O’Connor 0-2, K O’Sullivan, K Fitzgibbon 0-1 | Referee: P Foley (Waterford) |

| 17 November 2013 Quarter-final | Ballysaggart | 1-12 - 1-09 | Grenagh | Fraher Field |
| | Stephen Bennett 1-11, 0-7 frees, Shane Bennett 0-1. | Report | S Coleman 1-1, T Kenny, frees, and U Duggan 0-2 each, C Fitzgerald, S Bourke, M Barry and DD Dorgan 0-1 each. | Referee: A Sherlock (Tipperary) |

=== Munster semi-finals ===
| 17 November 2013 Semi-final | Bodyke | 1-11 - 1-14 | Feenagh-Kilmeedy | O'Garney Park |
| | P Fitzgerald 0-10 (7frees, 2 ‘65), P Walsh 1-0, K Quigley 0-1. | Report | D Coleman 1-6 (0-6frees), J O’Sullivan 0-4, E Murphy 0-2 (2frees), D Kiely and G O’Gorman 0-1 each. | Referee: J O'Brien (Tipperary) |

| 24 November 2013 Semi-final | Ballysaggart | 1-12 - 1-05 | Knockshegowna | Fraher Field |
| | S Bennett (1-5; 0-3f), B Murphy and K Bennett (0-2 each), S Bennett, M Kearney and D Meagher (0-1 each). | Report | D Costello (1-5; 0-5f). | Referee: D O'Driscoll (Limerick) |

=== Munster final ===
| 8 December 2013 Final | Ballysaggart | 3-12 - 0-15 | Feenagh-Kilmeedy | Mallow GAA Complex |
| | Stephen Bennett 1-7 (4f); Shane Bennett 1-2; R Walsh 1-0; D Meagher 0-2; C Murphy 0-1. | Report | D Coleman 0-6 (4f, 2 65); E Murphy 0-4 (4f); J O’Sullivan 0-2; J O’Gorman, L Lynch, J Nix, 0-1 each. | Referee: J O'Brien (Tipperary) |

== Ulster Junior Club Hurling Championship ==
=== Ulster preliminary round ===
| 29 September 2013 Preliminary round | Eoghan Rua | 4-14 - 1-09 | Setanta | Celtic Park |

=== Ulster quarter-finals ===
| 6 October 2013 Quarter-final | Craobh Rua | 3-09 - 0-10 | Monaghan Harps | St. Oliver Plunkett Park |
| | E Robb 0-5, J O'Connor 1-1, F Burns 1-0, M Bradley 1-0, F Bradley 0-3. | Report | M McKenna 0-4, A Ryan 0-4, B McQuaid 0-1, C Curley 0-1. |

| 6 October 2013 Quarter-final | Strabane Shamrocks | 3-14 - 2-12 | Lisnaskea Emmetts | Healy Park |
| | M Kane 0-11, G McGettigan 2-2, G Gilmore 1-0, A Murphy 0-1. | | K Mohan 2-3, S Curran 0-3, P McGoldrick 0-2, M Curran 0-2, E Mahon 0-1, S Smith 0-1. |

| 6 October 2013 Quarter-final | Kilclief | 2-09 - 1-13 | Creggan Kickhams | Páirc Tomás Ruiséil |

| 6 October 2013 Quarter-final | Mullahoran | 0-04 - 4-21 | Eoghan Rua | Ballyconnell Grounds |
| | | | C Gaile 0-15, C McGoldrick 3-0. |

=== Ulster semi-finals ===
| 13 October 2013 Semi-final | Eoghan Rua | 5-13 - 3-20 (aet) | Creggan Kickhams | Owenbeg COE |
| | SL McGoldrick (2-5); C Gaile (0-6), Ciaran McGoldrick (1-1); Colm McGoldrick (1-0), B McFarland (1-0), C Carey (0-1) | | O McCann (0-10), J Carey (1-1), K Rice (0-4); A McKeown (0-4), C McGrenaghan (1-0), J Dougan (1-0). |

| 13 October 2013 Semi-final | Strabane Shamrocks | 3-06 - 2-22 | Craobh Rua | O'Neill Park |
| | G Gilmore 1-1, S McGillion 1-0, G McGettigan 1-0, M Kane 0-3, J Patton 0-1, C Gallagher 0-1. | Report | E Robb 1-10, F Bradley 0-5, C Devlin 1-0, R Lewis 0-3, K Kane 0-2, M Bradley 0-1, S Casey 0-1. |

=== Ulster final ===
| 27 October 2013 Final | Craobh Rua | 1-07 - 0-13 | Creggan Kickhams | Athletic Grounds |
| | E Robb 0-4 (all frees), K Kane 1-1, P Cunningham, F Bradley 0-1 each. | Report | O McCann 0-7 (0-5f, 0-1 ‘65’), C McCann (0-3), J Carey, M Nelson, C McGrenaghan 0-1 each. |

== All-Ireland Junior Club Hurling Championship ==
=== All-Ireland quarter-final ===
| 15 December 2013 Quarter-final | Fullen Gaels | 1-08 - 0-10 | Ballinamare | Páirc na hÉireann |
| | R O'Donnell 0-6 (4fs), P Ryan 1-0, E Gleeson, G Jacob 0-1 each. | Report | P Murphy 0-4 (1f); S Weir 0-3; J McKeogh 0-2; M Og Buggy 0-1. | Referee: J Keane (Galway) |

=== All-Ireland semi-finals ===
| 26 January 2014 Semi-final | Creggan Kickhams | 2-10 - 1-08 | Fullen Gaels | Páirc Esler |
| | O McCann 0-7 (6f), C Small 1-1, C McGrenaghan 1-0, C McCann 0-2 (1f) | Report | A O’Neill 0-5 (5f), S Lawless 1-0, G Jacobs, A Morrissey, E Lyons 0-1 each | Referee: C Browne (Galway) |

| 26 January 2014 Semi-final | Ballysaggart | 4-13 - 0-08 | Calry/St Joseph's | O'Connor Park |
| | Stephen Bennett 1-8 (5f, 1 65), Shane Bennett 2-0, R Walsh 1-0, K Cashell, K Bennett 0-2 each, M Kearney 0-1. | Report | K Raymond 0-5 (4fs, 1 65), E McCarthy, C Griffin, L Reidy 0-1 each). | Referee: P O'Dwyer (Carlow) |

=== All-Ireland final ===
| 8 February 2014 Final | Creggan Kickhams | 2–21 – 5–12 | Ballysaggart | Croke Park |
| | C McCann 1–6 (1–0 pen, 2fs), O McCann 0–8 (5fs), K Rice 0–4 (1f), C Small 1–0, R McCann 0–2 (1f) J Carey 0–1. | Report | Stephen Bennett 2–7, (2-5fs), Shane Bennett 3–0, K Cashell 0–2, R Walsh, K Bennett, D Devine 0–1 each. | Referee: C Browne (Galway) |

| 15 February 2014 Final replay | Creggan Kickhams | 1–11 – 1–07 | Ballysaggart | Cusack Park |
| | C Small 1–3, C McCann (2f), O McCann 0–3 (2f) each, S Maguire, M Johnson 0–1 each. | Report | Stephen Bennett 1–1 (f), Shane Bennett 0–3 (2f) Kieran Bennett, D Meagher, C Kearney 0–1 each. | Referee: K Keenan (Wicklow) |

== Championship statistics ==
=== Miscellaneous ===
- Following their All-Ireland final replay defeat, Ballysaggart lodged on objection claiming that Creggan Kickhams fielded an illegal player. Ballysaggart believed that Conor Small shouldn’t have played in either final game or in the Creggan Kickhams semi-final win over Fullen Gaels as he was underage. According to rule 6.16, a player must be over 16 years to play an adult game. It also states to be “over” 16 the player’s 16th birthday must fall prior to January 1 of the championship year. The Central Competitions Control Committee (CCCC) subsequently rejected Ballysaggart's appeal, however, no explanation was given.
