= Brendan Lombard =

Irish hurler

Personal information
- Native name: Breandán Lombard (Irish)
- Born: 22 March 1980 (age 46) Ballinhassig, County Cork, Ireland
- Occupation: Pharmaceutical employee
- Height: 6 ft 0 in (183 cm)

Sport
- Sport: Hurling
- Position: Centre Back
Clubs
- Years: Club
- Ballinhassig → Carrigdhoun
Club titles
- Cork titles: 0
Inter-county
Years	County	Apps (scores)
2003–2004	Cork	1 (0-00)
Inter-county titles
- Munster titles: 1
- All-Irelands: 0
- NHL: 0
- All Stars: 0

Brendan Lombard (born 22 March 1980) is an Irish former hurler. At club level he played with Ballinhassig and divisional side Carrigdhoun and was also a member of the Cork senior hurling team. Lombard usually lined out in defence.

== Career ==
Lombard first played hurling at juvenile and underage levels with the Ballinhassig club before eventually progressing onto the club's top adult team. During a hugely successful career he won numerous South East titles, three County Championship titles across two grades, Munster club Championships and an All-Ireland Junior Club Championship title in 2003. He also earned selection to the Carrigdhoun divisional team. Lombard first appeared on the inter-county scene as a member of the Cork minor hurling team that beat Kilkenny in the 1998 All-Ireland minor final. He later lined out with the under-21 team before winning three All-Ireland Championships with the intermediate team, including one as team captain. Lombard was a member of the senior panel in 2003 before making his debut during the 2004 National League.

== Career statistics ==
Team	Year	National League			Munster		All-Ireland		Total	
Team	Year	Division	Apps	Score	Apps	Score	Apps	Score	Apps	Score
Cork	2003	Division 1B	—		—		—		—	
Cork	2004	Division 1B	6	2-03	1	0-00	—		7	2-03
Career total			6	2-03	1	0-00	—		7	2-03

== Honours ==
Ballinhassig

- Munster Intermediate Club Hurling Championship: 2005
- Cork Premier Intermediate Hurling Championship: 2005, 2012
- All-Ireland Junior Club Hurling Championship: 2003
- Munster Junior Club Hurling Championship: 2002
- Cork Junior A Hurling Championship: 2002
- South East Junior A Hurling Championship: 1998, 2000, 2002

Cork

- All-Ireland Senior Hurling Championship: 2004
- Munster Senior Hurling Championship: 2003, 2004
- All-Ireland Intermediate Hurling Championship: 2001, 2003, 2006
- Munster Intermediate Hurling Championship: 2001, 2003, 2006
- All-Ireland Minor Hurling Championship: 1998
- Munster Minor Hurling Championship: 1998

Sporting positions
Preceded by	Cork intermediate hurling team captain 2003	Succeeded by Brendan Walsh
Achievements
Preceded by Shane McClearn	All-Ireland Intermediate Hurling Final winning captain 2003	Succeeded by Brendan Walsh
