= 2014–15 All-Ireland Junior Club Hurling Championship =

Championship Details
- Dates: 5 October 2014 – 15 February 2015
- Teams: 28

All Ireland Champions
- Winners: Bennettsbridge (1st win)
- Captain: Rob Lennon
- Manager: Christy Walsh

All Ireland Runners-up
- Runners-up: Fullen Gaels
- Captain: Conall Maskey
- Manager: Stan Maurray-Hession

Provincial Champions
- Munster: Modeligo
- Leinster: Bennettsbridge
- Ulster: Castleblayney
- Connacht: Annaghdown

Championship Statistics
- Matches Played: 27
- Total Goals: 87 (3.22 per game)
- Total Points: 651 (24.11 per game)
- Top Scorer: Nicky Cleere (1-37)

The 2014–15 All-Ireland Junior Club Hurling Championship was the 12th staging of the All-Ireland Junior Club Hurling Championship since its establishment by the Gaelic Athletic Association. The championship ran from 5 October 2014 to 15 February 2015.

The All-Ireland final was played on 15 February 2015 at Croke Park in Dublin, between Bennettsbridge from Kilkenny and Fullen Gaels from Warwickshire, in what was their first ever meeting in the final. Bennettsbridge won the match by 3-19 to 1-08 to claim their first ever All-Ireland title.

Bennettsbridge's Nicky Cleere was the championship's top scorer with 1-37.

== Connacht Junior Club Hurling Championship ==
=== Connacht semi-final ===
27 October 2014 Semi-final	Carrick Hurling Club	0-08 - 1-09	Calry/St Joseph's	Páirc Sheáin Uí Eslin
	C Cunniffe (0-4), C Moreton (0-2), J Glancy (0-1), P McWeeney (0-1).	Report	K Raymond (0-7), D Cox (1-0), F Keown (0-1), D Collery (0-1).

=== Connacht final ===
8 November 2014 Final	Annaghdown	2-11 - 0-06	Calry/St Joseph's	Connacht COE
	D Comer (2-1), J Comer (0-7, 5f), C Gaffney (0-2); M Coleman (0-1).	Report	K Raymond (0-3, 2f), R Cox (0-2), C Griffin (0-1),

== Leinster Junior Club Hurling Championship ==
=== Leinster first round ===
26 October 2014 First round	Shamrocks	3-06 - 0-06	Clontarf	O'Connor Park
	B Tyrrell 2-0, T Darcy 0-6, N Dunne 1-0.		R McDyer 0-4, N O'Gorman 0-1, J Gleeson 0-1.

26 October 2014 First round	St. Brigid's	1-24 - 1-03	Barndarig	Fr. O'Brien Park
	D Faulkner 0-10, B Gavin 1-2, P Sheridan 0-3, J Gonoud 0-3, B Slevin 0-3, N Cully 0-1, M Geraghty 0-1, A O'Brien 0-1.		G Doyle 1-1, E Dempsey 0-1, J Waldron 0-1.

26 October 2014 First round	Crossabeg-Ballymurn	2-15 - 1-05	Park–Ratheniska	St Patrick's Park
	B Murphy 2-1, N Murphy 0-6, S Carroll 0-2, O Foley 0-2, C Devereux 0-1, M Campbell 0-1, E McDonald 0-1, D Foley 0-1.		M Carroll 1-0, J Holohan 0-3, B Fingleton 0-1, D Cahill 0-1.

=== Leinster quarter-finals ===
8 November 2014 Quarter-final	Crossabeg-Ballymurn	4-18 - 1-09	Moorefield	St Patrick's Park
	O Foley 2-3, D Kehoe 1-3, P Foley 0-6, C Shovlin 1-0, S Carroll 0-2, C Devereux 0-2, E McDonald 0-1, C O'Rourke 0-1.		D Carroll 1-6, J Finnegan 0-1, I McDonald 0-1, M Doyle 0-1.

9 November 2014 Quarter-final	St. Brigid's	2-20 - 1-20 (aet)	Knocbridge	Fr. O'Brien Park
	D Quinn 1-4, J Gonaud 1-4, D Faulkner 0-4, N Cully 0-3, M Geraghty 0-2, T Geraghty 0-1, C Slevin 0-1, A O'Brien 0-1.		S Byrne 0-11, C Deane 1-1, S Fennell 0-2, J Costello 0-2, D Kettle 0-2, S Kerrigan 0-1, D Dunne 0-1.

15 November 2014 Quarter-final	Shamrocks	2-19 - 1-10	Carlow Town	Ballinamere Grounds
	T Darcy 0-10, G Mooney 1-3, N Dunne 1-1, J O'Toole 0-2, A Kidney 0-2, B Kelly 0-1.		C Clancy 0-7, K English 1-1, C Lawlor 0-1, R O'Sullivan 0-1.

16 November 2014 Quarter-final	Dunderry	0-04 - 4-25	Bennettsbridge	St Loman's Park
	D Gilkeson 0-3, J Martin 0-1.		N Cleere 0-9, K Blanchfield 2-2, B Lennon 1-1, W Murphy 1-1, S Morrissey 0-4, D Wafer 0-3, M Shiel 0-2, J Cleere 0-2, A Cleere 0-1.

=== Leinster semi-finals ===
23 November 2014 Semi-final	Crossabeg-Ballymurn	0-11 - 1-19	Bennettsbridge	St Patrick's Park
	B Murphy 0-4, P Foley 0-3, E McDonald 0-2, M Campbell 0-1, C Shovlin 0-1.		N Cleere 1-6, S Morrissey 0-5, B Lennon 0-2, L Blanchfield 0-2, A Cleere 0-2, CWeafer 0-2.

23 November 2014 Semi-final	Shamrocks	1-17 - 0-11	St. Brigid's	Ballinamere Grounds
	T Darcy 0-9, N Dunne 0-5, B Tyrrell 1-0, J O'Toole 0-2, G Mooney 0-1.		D Faulkner 0-5, D Quinn 0-2, C Slevin 0-2, K Geraghty 0-1, M Geraghty 0-1.

=== Leinster final ===
6 December 2014 Final	Shamrocks	0-03 - 1-20	Bennettsbridge	O'Connor Park
	T Darcy 0-3 (2f).	Report	N Cleere 0-7 (5f), B Lannon 1-2 (1f), H O’Neill & W Murphy (2f) 0-3 each, D Wafer, S Morrissey, C Wafer, A Cleere & M Shiel 0-1 each.	Referee: D Harrington (Dublin)

== Munster Junior Club Hurling Championship ==
=== Munster quarter-finals ===
2 November 2014 Quarter-final	Kenmare	0-10 - 1-16	Castlemartyr	Austin Stack Park
	J Duncan 0-9, J Spillane 0-1.	Report	Barry Lawton 0-6, J Stack 1-1, Brian Lawton 0-4, M O'Neill 0-2, A Bowens 0-1, B Ó Tuama 0-1, L Martin 0-1.

2 November 2014 Quarter-final	Skeheenarinky	0-10 - 0-17	Feoghnagh-Castlemahon	The Park
	C Sweeney 0-6, F O'Sullivan 0-2, N Vaughan 0-1, J O'Callaghan 0-1.		A Roche 0-9, Séamus Flanagan 0-4, J Reidy 0-2, P Lomasney 0-1, S Flanagan 0-1.

=== Munster semi-final ===
16 November 2014 Semi-final	Feoghnagh-Castlemahon	2-12 - 2-17	Modeligo	Quaid Park
	J Butler 2-2, JF Reidy 0-3, A Roche 0-3, Séamus Flanagan 0-2, M Fitzgibbon 0-2.		Troy 0-8, P O'Donovan 1-4, T Devine 1-3, T Walsh 0-1, M Troy 0-1.	Referee: J Larkin (Cork)

- Castlemartyr received a bye in this round as there were no Clare representatives.

=== Munster final ===
7 December 2014 Final	Modeligo	5-12 - 0-14	Castlemartyr	Mallow GAA Complex
	J Troy 1-6 (0-4 fs); M Troy, T Devine 2-0 each; K McCarthy 0-3; N O’Donovan 0-2; P O’Donovan 0-1.	Report	Barry Lawton 0-10 (0-8 fs, 0-1 65); Brian Lawton, B O Tuama, C Bowens and E Clifford 0-1 each.	Referee: J Murphy (Limerick)

== Ulster Junior Club Hurling Championship ==
=== Ulster quarter-finals ===
5 October 2014 Quarter-final	Con Magee's	0-12 - 1-08	Carryduff	Fr. Healy Park

5 October 2014 Quarter-final	Cootehill Celtic	1-04 - 4-20	Castleblayney	Hugh O'Reilly Park
	R Rodger 1-0, F Hughes 0-2, L McKenna 0-1, J Crowe 0-1.		D Crowe 2-3, F Rafter 2-2, T Forde 1-3, N Garland 0-5, P Collins 1-0, S Forde 0-3, M Treanor 0-2, C McBride 0-1.

5 October 2014 Quarter-final	Killeavy	0-12 - 3-08	Strabane Shamrocks	Keady Grounds

5 October 2014 Quarter-final	Na Magha	7-21 - 0-05	Seán MacCumhaills	Celtic Park

=== Ulster semi-finals ===
12 October 2014 Semi-final	Con Magee's	4-07 - 4-10	Castleblayney	O'Neill Park
	N Donnelly 1-4, D Traynor 1-0, B McCann 1-0, S Kerr 1-0, N McCann 0-2, B O'Neill 0-1.		F Rafter 2-1, S Forde 2-0, H Byrne 0-5, B McGuigan 0-2, D Crowe 0-1, M Treanor 0-1.

12 October 2014 Semi-final	Strabane Shamrocks	3-11 - 5-10	Na Magha	O'Donnell Park

=== Ulster final ===
7 December 2014 Final	Castleblayney	4-13 - 1-07	Na Magha	O'Neill Park
	H Byrne 0-7 (3fs, 2 '65s'), T Forde 2-1, F Rafter 1-3, N Garland 1-0, D Crowe, B McGuigan 0-1 each.	Report	B Douban 1-1, D Connolly 0-3, D Foley 0-2, A Grant 0-1.

== All-Ireland Junior Club Hurling Championship ==
=== All-Ireland quarter-final ===
11 January 2015 Quarter-final	Fullen Gaels	2–06 – 0–10	Modeligo	Páirc na hÉireann
	R McEntee 0–1, C O'Callaghan 0–4 (3f), P Duggan 0–1, V Morrissey 2–0.	Report	P Fitzgerald 0–1, P O' Donovan, 0–2 (1f), K McCarthy 0–4 (1f), T Devine 0–3(2f).	Referee: G McGrath (Wexford)

=== All-Ireland semi-finals ===
25 January 2015 Semi-final	Castleblayney	1–07 – 2–18	Fullen Gaels	Coolock
	H Byrne 0–4 (0-3f, 0–1 ‘65), S Forde 1–0, N Garland 0–2 (0–1, 0–1 ‘65).	Report	V Morrissey 1–5 (0-3f, 0–1 '65), C O’Callaghan 0–7 (0-5f), P Duggan 1–1, S Garry 0–3 (0–2 65s), V Feherty 0–1, G Jacob 0–1.	Referee: D Hughes (Carlow)

25 January 2015 Semi-final	Bennettsbridge	2–19 – 0–09	Annaghdown	MacDonagh Park
	N Cleere (0–6, 5f, 65); S Morrissey, B Lannon (0–4 each); C Wafer (1–1); L Blanchfield (1–0); A Cleere (0–2); D Wafer, H O’Neill (0–1 each).	Report	J Comer (0–4, frees); D. Comer (0–2, 1f 1pen); F. O’Doherty, A Murphy, C. Gaffney (0–1 each).	Referee: J O'Brien (Tipperary)

=== All-Ireland final ===
15 February 2015 Final	Bennettsbridge	3–19 – 1–08	Fullen Gaels	Croke Park
	N Cleere 0–9 (6fs), S Morrissey 0–3, L Blanchfield, H O'Neill 1–1 each, B Lannon 1–0, C Wafer 0–2, A Cleere, K Blanchfield, M Shiel 0–1 each.	Report	V Morrissey 0–4 (2fs), C O'Callaghan 0–3 (1pen, 2fs), T Corcoran 1–0, S Garry 0–1 (1f).	Referee: J Keane (Galway)

== Championship statistics ==
=== Miscellaneous ===
- Castleblayney Hurling Club became the first club to win two Ulster Championship titles.
- Fullen Gaels became the first club to lose two All-Ireland finals.
