= All-Ireland Junior Club Hurling Championship =

GAA Hurling All-Ireland Junior Club Championship
- Current season or competition: 2026–27 All-Ireland Junior Club Hurling Championship
- Irish: Craobh Shóisireach Iomáint Chlub na hÉireann
- Code: Hurling
- Founded: 2002-03
- Region: Ireland and Great Britain (GAA)
- No. of teams: 5
- Title holders: Kilbrittain (1st title)
- Sponsors: Allied Irish Banks (AIB)
- TV partner: TG4

The All-Ireland Junior Club Hurling Championship, known as the All-Ireland Club JHC for short, is an annual inter-county club hurling competition organised by the Gaelic Athletic Association (GAA) since 2002-03 for eligible hurling clubs. Clubs qualify for the competition based on their performance in their county club championships.

The final, usually held in early February, serves as the culmination of a series of games played during the winter months, and the results determine which county's team receives the cup. The championship has always been played on a straight knockout basis whereby once a team loses they are eliminated from the series. In the present format, it begins in October with provincial championships held in Connacht, Leinster, Munster and Ulster, with the four respective champions contesting the subsequent All-Ireland series with the British champions.

Kilbrittain are the title holders, defeating Easkey in the 2026 final.

== Qualification ==
The GAA Hurling All-Ireland Junior Club Championship features five teams in the final tournament. 32 teams contest the five provincial junior club championships with the four provincial champions, and the British champions, automatically qualifying for the All-Ireland series.

Province	Championship	Qualifying Team
Connacht	Connacht Junior Club Hurling Championship	Champions
Leinster	Leinster Junior Club Hurling Championship	Champions
Munster	Munster Junior Club Hurling Championship	Champions
Ulster	Ulster Junior Club Hurling Championship	Champions
Britain	British Junior Club Hurling Championship	Champions

== List of finals ==
Year	Winners			Runners-up			Venue	Winning Captain
Year	County	Club	Score	County	Club	Score	Venue	Winning Captain
2025-26	COR	Kilbrittain	0-19	SLI	Easkey	0-18	Croke Park	Philip Wall
2024-25	KIL	St Lachtain's	1-18	COR	Russell Rovers	0-16	Croke Park	
2023-24	KIL	Tullogher-Rosbercon	2-21	COR	St.Catherine's	1-13	Croke Park	
2022-23	COR	Ballygiblin	1-16	SLI	Easkey	0-11	Croke Park	
2021-22	KIL	Mooncoin	0-22	COR	Ballygiblin	1-18	Croke Park	
2020-21	No Championship							
2019-20	KIL	Conahy Shamrocks	0-22	COR	Russell Rovers	0-15	Croke Park	
2018-19	KIL	Dunnamaggin	1-17	MON	Castleblayney	1-13	Croke Park	
2017-18	WAT	Ardmore	3-11	WEX	St. Mogues, Fethard	0-18	Croke Park	
2016-17	COR	Mayfield	2-16	KIL	Mooncoin	1-18	Croke Park	Shane O' Donovan
2015-16	KIL	Glenmore	2-08	DER	Eoghan Rua	0-12	Croke Park	Philip Roche
2014-15	KIL	Bennettsbridge	3-19	LAN	Fullen Gaels	1-08	Croke Park	Robert Lennon
2013-14	ANT	Kickhams Creggan	1-11 (2-21)	WAT	Ballysaggart	1-07 (5-12)	Cusack Park	Stephen Colgan
2012-13	KIL	Thomastown	2-17	LAN	Fullen Gaels	2-14	Croke Park	Jonjo Farrell
2011-12	KIL	St. Patrick's, Ballyraggett	1-13	COR	Charleville	1-12	Croke Park	Kieran Delaney
2010-11	COR	Meelin	0-12	KIL	John Locke's	1-05	Croke Park	Jerry Forrest
2009-10	LIM	Blackrock	1-18	TYR	Naomh Colum Cille	0-09	Croke Park	Brendan Hennessy
2008-09	COR	Dripsey	2-15	KIL	Tullogher-Rosbercon	0-18	Croke Park	Diarmuid O'Riordan
2007-08	KIL	Conahy Shamrocks	0-19	TIP	Moyle Rovers	1-09	Croke Park	Eoin Murphy
2006-07	KIL	Danesfort	2-16	ANT	Clooney Gaels	2-08	Croke Park	Tony Woodcock
2005-06	COR	Fr. O'Neill's	2-16	CAR	Erin's Own	2-10	Croke Park	Jer Holland
2004-05	KIL	Galmoy	2-18	ROS	Oran	0-09	Semple Stadium	
2003-04	No Championship							
2002-03	COR	Ballinhassig	4-15	KIL	Blacks and Whites	1-06	Walsh Park	James Aherne

== Roll of honour ==
=== By club ===
Club	County	Winners	Runners-up	Years won	Years Runners-up
Conahy Shamrocks	KIL	2	0	2008, 2020	—
Mooncoin	KIL	1	1	2022	2017
Ballygiblin	COR	1	1	2023	2022
Tullogher-Rosbercon	KIL	1	1	2024	2008
Ballinhassig	COR	1	0	2003	—
Galmoy	KIL	1	0	2005	—
Fr. O'Neill's	COR	1	0	2006	—
Danesfort	KIL	1	0	2007	—
Dripsey	COR	1	0	2009	—
Blackrock	LIM	1	0	2010	—
Meelin	COR	1	0	2011	—
St. Patrick's, Ballyraggett	KIL	1	0	2012	—
Thomastown	KIL	1	0	2013	—
Kickhams Creggan	ANT	1	0	2014	—
Bennettsbridge	KIL	1	0	2015	—
Glenmore	KIL	1	0	2016	—
Mayfield	COR	1	0	2017	—
Ardmore	WAT	1	0	2018	—
Dunnamaggin	KIL	1	0	2019	—
Kilbrittain	COR	1	0	2026	—
Fullen Gaels	LAN	0	2	—	2013, 2015
Easkey	SLI	0	2	—	2023, 2026
Blacks and Whites	KIL	0	1	—	2003
Oran	ROS	0	1	—	2005
Erin's Own	CAR	0	1	—	2006
Clooney Gaels	ANT	0	1	—	2007
Moyle Rovers	TIP	0	1	—	2009
Naomh Colum Cille	TYR	0	1	—	2010
John Locke's	KIL	0	1	—	2011
Charleville	COR	0	1	—	2012
Ballysaggart	WAT	0	1	—	2014
Eoghan Rua	DER	0	1	—	2016
St. Mogues, Fethard	WEX	0	1	—	2018
Castleblayney	MON	0	1	—	2019
Russell Rovers	COR	0	1	—	2020
St.Catherine's	COR	0	1	—	2024

=== By county ===
County	Titles	Runners-up	Total
Kilkenny	12	4	16
Cork	7	5	12
Antrim	1	1	2
Waterford	1	1	2
Limerick	1	0	1
Lancashire	0	2	2
Sligo	0	2	2
Carlow	0	1	1
Derry	0	1	1
Monaghan	0	1	1
Roscommon	0	1	1
Tipperary	0	1	1
Tyrone	0	1	1
Wexford	0	1	1

=== By province ===
Province	Titles	Runners-up	Total
Leinster	12	6	18
Munster	9	7	16
Ulster	1	4	5
Britain	0	2	2
Connacht	0	3	3

== Records and statistics ==
=== Winning teams ===
Year	Winners	Winning team
2025/26	Kilbrittain	D Desmond; E O’Neill, J Hurley, D Considine; T Sheehan, A Holland, E O’Neill; S Sexton, J O’Donovan; M Hickey, P Wall, R Crowley; B Butler, L Griffin, C Hogan. Subs: T Harrington for O’Neill; D Harrington for Butler; C Ustianowski for Hogan; E Byrne for Considine.
2024/25	St Lachtain's	Darren Brennan; Simon Rafter, Criomhthann Bergin, Shane Dawson; Pádraig Donnelly, Brian Kennedy, Cathal Hickey; Brendan Quinn, Mark Donnelly; Alexander Rafter , Paddy Killeen, Cathal O’Leary; Shane Donnelly, James Maher, Liam Hickey, Subs: Darragh Maher for O’Leary, John Fitzpatrick for Maher, Cian Dawson for S Donnelly, Jerry Bergin for Rafter.
2023/24	Tullogher-Rosbercon	Davy Walsh; Richard Gill, Donncha O’Connor, Sean Murray; Lar Murphy, Pat Hartley, Cathal Mooney; Jamie Lyng, Colman O’Sullivan; Marty Murphy, Walter Walsh, Jason Shiely; Danny Glennon, Conor Hennessy, Cian O’Donoghue. Subs: Michael Handrick for Shiely, Stephen Lawlor for Mooney, Niall O’Shea for Gill, Tony Conway for Murray, Brian Walsh for Murphy
2022/23	Ballygiblin	Christopher Noonan; Lorcan Finn, Fionn Herlihy, James Mullins; Micheal Lewis, Mark Keane, Barry Coffey; Ryan Donegan, Killian Roche; Dean Barry, Darragh Flynn, Shane Beston; Joe O’Sullivan; Seán O’Sullivan, Cathail O’Mahony. Subs: Kieran Duggan for Barry, Dillon Sheehan for S O’Sullivan, Patrick Molloy for Beston, Aaron O’Brien for Roche, Cian O’Brien for Finn
2021/22	Mooncoin	Eoin Purcell; Aidan Doyle, Cormac Daly, Mark Kearns; Martin O’Neill, Paul Henebry, Jim Delahunty; Máirtín Gannon, Seán Gannon; Ciarán Quilty, John Fitzgerald, Kevin Crowley; Adam Croke, Patrick Walsh, Killian Hogan. Subs: Seán O’Dwyer for Crowley
2019/20	Conahy Shamrocks	Padraic Delaney, Simon Callinan, Davy Healy, Liam Cass, Darren Cuddihy, Brian Healy, Eoin Carroll, Donal Brennan, Eddie Delaney, Tom Phelan, John Mullan, Eoin Cahill, James Bergin (Capt.), Kieran Mooney, Bill Murphy, Karl Downey, Alan Healy, Tom Rice, Tom Nolan, Sean Brennan, Michael Bergin, Dara Dooley, Padraig Gunner, Frank Gunner, Cian Harding, Justin Brophy, Donal Cass, Kieran Delaney, Andy O’Keeffe, Geoffrey O’Shea. The Management Team - Paul Buggy (Manager & Selector), Brian Rossiter, Kevin Healy and Diarmuid Healy (Selectors).
2018/19	Dunnamaggin	Seaghan O’Neill; Mark Heffernan, Noel Hickey, Victor Costello; Michael Cody, William Phelan, Andrew Fitzpatrick; Darren Fitzpatrick, Eoghan Kearney; Thomas Maher, John Fitzpatrick, Darragh O’Keefe; Ronan Coffey, Ray Cody, Adam Fitzpatrick. Subs: Jack Brett, Ian Walsh
2017/18	Ardmore	J Walsh; D Power, D Prendergast, N Hennessy; G Williams, Seamus Keating, R Hennessy; K Murphy, W Hennessy; S Barron, D Gartland, M Cronin; J Flavin, S Prendergast, J Gartland. Subs: J Kennedy for Cronin, K Conway for Power, Stephen Keating for W Hennessy, M Cronin for Kennedy, W Hennessy for Williams
2016/17	Mayfield	R O’Keefe; K Brosnan, D Lucey, B O’Leary; G Lehane, S O’Donovan, G Looney; K Punch, D Hayes; D O’Neill, N Kelly, D Malone; S Duggan, S Kelly, P Duggan. Subs: I Looney, C O’Sullivan, K Walsh. Report
2015/16	Glenmore	D Aylward; S Duggan, F Freyne, S Doherty; P Roche, R Mullally, M Phelan; S Murphy, D Aylward; J Cody, E Murphy, E Vereker; A Murphy, M Phelan, M Aylward. Subs: L Hennessy, B Doherty, D Croke. Report
2014/15	Bennettsbridge	E Cleere; J Moran, R Lennon, S Wemyss; J Cleere, E Morrissey, A Cleere; D Wafer, K Blanchfield; N Cleere, S Morrissey, C Wafer; L Blanchfield, B Lannon, H O’Neill. Subs: Paul O’Neill, M Shiel, Patrick O’Neill, W Murphy, E Fitzgerald. Report
2013/14	Kickhams Creggan	B Prenter; B Maguire, A Maguire, D Carey; F McCauley, T McCann, M Johnson; R McCann, A McKeown; K Rice, O McCann, J Carey; C Small, S Maguire, C McCann. Subs: M Nelson, D McCann.
2012/13	Thomastown	Darragh McGarry; Sean Mahony, Shane Lanigan, Brian Murphy; Barry Whelan, Pater O’Hanrahan, Richard O’Hara; Dessie Walsh, Derek Lannigan; Stuart Waugh, Michael Donnelly, Darren Burke, Thomas O’Hanrahan, Jonjo Farrell, Dylan Waugh. Subs: Adrian Burke for O’Hanrahan, Edward Tennyson for Murphy
2011/12	St. Patrick's, Ballyraggett	M Gannon; J Mooney, G Morrissey, S Staunton; P Cahill, G Brennan, S Roberts; B Phelan, J Gannon; J Phelan, S Kenny, K Kelly; M Brennan, B Staunton, J Brennan. Subs: C Delaney for M Brennan; E Bergin for J Gannon; C Ruth for C Delaney.
2010/11	Meelin	S M O'Sullivan; M Forrest, D O'Riordan, D Linehan; W Buckley, K Collins, Jerry Forrest; L Collins, W Murphy; John Forrest, S O'Riordan, B O'Sullivan; E Brosnan, J Curtin (0-1), DJ O'Sullivan. Subs: Thomas O'Mahony.
2009/10	Blackrock	P Heffernan; N Hosford, TG Ryan, T Clifford; R Murphy, B Moloney, N Moloney; D Moloney, S Hennessey; K Palmer, B Hennessey (capt), R McCarthy; R O’Shaughnessy, P McGrath, A Murphy. Subs: B O’Shaughnessy for S Hennessy; V Herbert for N Moloney; K Douglas for A Murphy; D Danagher for Ryan; A Fitzgerald for Heffernan.
2008/09	Dripsey	-
2007/08	Conahy Shamrocks	Eoin Murphy (Capt.); Seamus Óg Brennan, Paul Buggy, Tom Nolan, David Healy, Denis Kelly, Brian Healy, John Wallace, Martin Fitzpatrick, Kieran Mooney, Declan Buggy, Padraic Nolan, Micheál Lawler, Alan Healy, Gavin Nolan, Andy O’Keeffe, Michael Bergin, Eoin Fitzpatrick, Canice Brennan, Tomás Lawless, Damien Webster, Ciarán Muldowney, Ian Kavanagh, Conor Brennan, Fionnán Brennan, Peter Dollard, Gary Kavanagh, Padraig Conway, Eoin Byrne, Tom O’Shea, Daire Connery, Colm Healy, Peter Harding. The Management Team – Martin Fitzpatrick (Manager & Selector), Dermot Healy (Coach & Selector), Paul Byrne & Eamonn Delaney.
2006/07	Danesfort	S. Hurley; G. O’Keeffe, T. Mahony, P. Dillon, T. Woodcock, L. Forrestal, P. Hogan, P. Walsh, T. Dunne, P. Murphy, D. Forrestal, P. Forrestal, R. Hogan, G. Power, R. Walsh. Subs: P. Treacy for Power, F. Manogue for D. Forrestal.
2005/06	Fr. O'Neill's	-
2004/05	Galmoy	L Drennan; P Doyle, B Lonergan, C Doherty; P Delaney, M Brennan, Niall Doherty; B Doherty, D Doyle; D Gray, M Phelan, Noel Doherty; P Russell, K Lonergan, A Gray. Subs: P Brennan, D Delaney for, G Doherty, B Delaney, L Doherty.
2002/03	Ballinhassig	M Coleman, Jnr; Declan Healy, Brian O'Sullivan, Stephen McCarthy; Jer Holland, B Lombard, James Ahern; John O'Sullivan, Paul Lombard; John Mullaney, Declan O'Sullivan, Darren Dineen; Tadhg Coleman, Michael Ahern, Diarmuid Duggan. Subs: F O'Leary, Brendan Coleman, Declan Lombard, Con Coughlan.

== Provincial Champions ==
Year	Connacht champions	Leinster champions	Munster champions	Ulster champions	Britain champions
2025/26	Easkey (Sligo)	Davidstown/Courtnacuddy (Wexford)	Kilbrittain (Cork)	Burt GAA (Donegal)	Thomas McCurtains (London)
2024/25	Easkey (Sligo)	St Lachtain's (Kilkenny)	Russell Rovers (Cork)	Ballinascreen (Derry)	Fr. Murphy's (London)
2023/24	Easkey (Sligo)	Tullogher-Rosbercon (Kilkenny)	St Catherine's (Cork)	Castleblayney (Monaghan)	Seán Treacy's (London)
2022/23	Easkey (Sligo)	Horeswood (Wexford)	Ballygiblin (Cork)	Setanta (Donegal)	Kilburn Gaels (London)
2021/22	Salthill-Knocknacarra (Galway)	Mooncoin (Kilkennny)	Ballygiblin (Cork)	Craobh Rua (Armagh)	Fullen Gaels (Lancashire)
2020/21	No Championship				
2019/20	Mícheál Breathnach (Galway)	Conahy Shamrocks (Kilkenny)	Russell Rovers (Cork)	Eoghan Rua (Derry)	John Mitchel's (Warwickshire)
2018/19	Carrick Hurling Club (Leitrim)	Dunnamaggin (Kilkenny)	Cloughduv (Cork)	Castleblayney (Monaghan)	John Mitchel's (Warwickshire)
2017/18	Sylane (Galway)	Fethard St Mogue's (Wexford)	Ardmore (Waterford)	Setanta Hurling Club (Donegal)	Brothers Pearse (Yorkshire)
2016/17	Calry/St Joseph's (Sligo)	Mooncoin (Kilkenny)	Mayfield (Cork)	Lámh Dhearg (Antrim)	Fullen Gaels (Lancashire)
2015/16	Sylane (Galway)	Glenmore (Kilkenny)	Dungourney (Cork)	Eoghan Rua (Derry)	Fullen Gaels (Lancashire)
2014/15	Annaghdown (Galway)	Bennettsbridge (Kilkenny)	Modeligo (Waterford)	Castleblayney (Monaghan)	Fullen Gaels (Lancashire)
2013/14	Calry/St Joseph's (Sligo)	Ballinamere (Offaly)	Ballysaggart (Waterford)	Kickhams Creggan (Antrim)	Fullen Gaels (Lancashire)
2012/13	Calry/St Joseph's (Sligo)	Thomastown (Kilkenny)	Kildorrery (Cork)	Bredagh (Down)	Fullen Gaels (Lancashire)
2011/12	Ballygar (Galway)	St Patrick's Ballyraggett (Kilkenny)	Charleville (Cork)	Burt (Donegal)	Fullen Gaels (Lancashire)
2010/11	Bearna/Na Forbacha (Galway)	John Locke's (Kilkenny)	Meelin (Cork)	Inniskeen Grattans (Monaghan)	Fullen Gaels (Lancashire)
2009/10	Calry/St Joseph's (Sligo)	Blacks and Whites (Kilkenny)	Blackrock GAA (Limerick)	Naomh Colum Cille (Tyrone)	John Mitchel's (Warwickshire)
2008/09	Skehana (Galway)	Tullogher–Rosbercon (Kilkenny)	Dripsey (Cork)	Lisbellaw St Patrick's (Fermanagh)	John Mitchel's (Warwickshire)
2007/08	Sylane (Galway)	Conahy Shamrocks (Kilkenny)	Moyle Rovers (Tipperary)	Glen Rovers Armoy (Antrim)	Brothers Pearse (London)
2006/07	Skehana (Galway)	Danesfort (Kilkenny)	Kilworth (Cork)	Clooney Gaels (Antrim)	Erin go Bragh (Warwickshire)
2005/06	Skehana (Galway)	Erin's Own GAA (Carlow)	Fr O'Neill's (Cork)	Castleblayney (Monaghan)	Thomas McCurtains (London)
2004/05	Oran Hurling Club (Roscommon)	Galmoy (Kilkenny)	Ballygarvan (Cork)	Shane O'Neills Glenarm (Antrim)	John Mitchel's (Warwickshire)*
2002/03	Not played	Blacks and Whites (Kilkenny)	Ballinhassig (Cork)	Not played	Fr Murphy's (London)*

*British champions did not enter the All Ireland JHC until 2004.

== See also ==
- All-Britain Club Hurling Championship
- Munster Junior Club Hurling Championship
- Leinster Junior Club Hurling Championship
- Connacht Junior Club Hurling Championship
- Ulster Junior Club Hurling Championship
- All-Ireland Senior Club Hurling Championship
- All-Ireland Intermediate Club Hurling Championship
- All-Ireland Junior B Club Hurling Championship
- All-Ireland Senior Club Camogie Championship
- All-Ireland Senior Club Football Championship
