= Fullen Gaels GAA =

Hurling and camogie club in Manchester, England

- CLG Fullen Gaels
- Founded: 2005
- County: Lancashire
- Colours: Black and amber
- Grounds: Hough End, Chorlton

Playing kits
Standard colours

Fullen Gaels Hurling and Camogie Club is a Gaelic Athletic Association club based in Chorlton, Manchester, England. They are one of the member clubs of the Lancashire County Board.

== History ==
Fullen Gaels were formed in February 2005 in St Kentigerns Social Club, Fallowfield, by a small group including Denis Cleary and Michael Kennedy (St Brendan’s GAC), Richard Deloughry (St Anne’s GAC), and Seán Hackett (St Lawrence’s GAC). The Gaels were the first hurling club in Lancashire since the disbandment of Sarsfields two decades' prior. The club was named after Fr Emmett Fullen, former player for Desertmartin, Derry, and the Lancashire county football team, who was an influential figure in the formation of both St Brendan's and St Lawrence's. Fr Fullen also worked at the St Brendan's Irish Centre, Trafford, looking after the welfare of local Irish people before his death in 1985.

The club's original colours were red and white, the colours of Derry, which were not worn by any of the clubs in Lancashire. The crest originally depicted a Lancashire rose and a shamrock set inside a cross to recognising Fr. Fullen's ministry. This was later changed to include the worker bee of Manchester, a ship (to represent the Manchester ship canal), symbols of the GAA, and the Fullen family arms. The club's colours were also changed to black and amber.

With a lack of other hurling clubs in Lancashire, Fullen Gaels began competing in the Warwickshire County Championship, as well as Division 2 of the London Hurling League in 2006. They won their first silverware in the same year, with a Ronan Cup victory at the Emerald GAA Grounds, beating Clann na Gael by 3-11 to 1-11. In 2014, the Lancashire Hurling Championship was reformed, with Gaels joining Yorkshire Emeralds and Liverpool Wolfe Tones in the new competition.

Gaels won the Warwickshire Championship for the first time in 2010, going on to win the All-Britain Junior Hurling Club Championship. They would go on to win the All-Britain 7 times in a row from 2010 to 2016, and twice reached the All-Ireland Junior Club Hurling Championship final in 2013 and 2015, being beaten by Thomastown and Bennettsbridge respectively. The Gaels would return to All-Britain success in 2021, making them the second most successful hurling team in Britain behind St Gabriels.

In 2011, Fullen Gaels expanded with the addition of a camogie team. They are North West England's sole camogie team. The team's first involvement in competitive championship was in the 2012 London Senior League and Championship, before switching in 2015 to the All-Britain Junior League and Championship. After two years competing at junior level, Gaels won the 2017 All-Britain Junior Camogie Championship, progressing to the Intermediate Championship for the 2018 season. In 2018, after going unbeaten in both the League and Championship, the team competed in the All-Ireland Junior B Club Camogie Championship, losing to Clontibret of Monaghan.

The camogie team progressed to senior level in 2019, and in 2025, they won their first senior All-Britain title, beating Thomas McCurtains in the final. They were beaten in the All-Ireland Junior Club Championship preliminary round by Con Magees Glenravel in Antrim.

In 2022, Fullen Gaels camogie player and referee Ciara Mannion became the first woman to referee a senior men's hurling championship match in Britain.

=== All-Ireland Junior Club Hurling Championship record ===
Championship year	Quarter-final	Semi-final	Final
2010-11	Meelin (Cork)		
2011-12	Burt (Donegal)	Charleville (Cork)	
2012-13	Calry/St. Joseph's (Sligo)	Bredagh (Down)	Thomastown (Kilkenny)
2013-14	Ballinamere (Offaly)	Creggan Kickhams (Antrim)	
2014-15	Modeligo (Waterford)	Castleblayney (Monaghan)	Bennettsbridge (Kilkenny)
2015-16	Eoghan Rua (Derry)		
2016-17	Calry/St. Joseph's (Sligo)		
2021-22	Craobh Rua (Armagh)	Ballygiblin (Cork)	

== Honours ==
=== Hurling ===
- All-Britain Hurling Club Championship (8)
  - 2010, 2011, 2012, 2013, 2014, 2015, 2016, 2021
- Warwickshire Senior Hurling Championship (4)
  - 2010, 2011, 2012, 2013
- Lancashire Senior Hurling Club Championship (10)
  - 2014, 2016, 2017, 2018, 2019, 2020, 2021, 2022, 2024, 2026
- Ronan Cup (London) (1)
  - 2006

=== Camogie ===
- All-Britain Senior Camogie Championship (1)
  - 2025
- All-Britain Senior Camogie League (2)
  - 2021, 2025
- All-Britain Intermediate Camogie Championship (1)
  - 2018
- All-Britain Intermediate Camogie League (1)
  - 2018
- All-Britain Junior Camogie Championship (1)
  - 2017
- Birmingham Women's 7s Championship (1)
  - 2017
- Birmingham Women's 7s Shield (1)
  - 2014
