= 2012–13 All-Ireland Junior Club Hurling Championship =

Championship Details
- Dates: 29 September 2012 - 10 February 2013
- Teams: 28

All Ireland Champions
- Winners: Thomastown (1st win)
- Captain: Jonjo Farrell

All Ireland Runners-up
- Runners-up: Fullen Gaels
- Captain: Conall Maskey

Provincial Champions
- Munster: Kildorrery
- Leinster: Thomastown
- Ulster: Bredagh
- Connacht: Calry/St. Joseph's

Championship Statistics
- Matches Played: 28
- Top Scorer: Michael Donnelly (0-40)

The 2012–13 All-Ireland Junior Club Hurling Championship was the 10th staging of the All-Ireland Junior Club Hurling Championship since its establishment by the Gaelic Athletic Association. The championship began on 29 September 2012 and ended on 10 February 2013.

On 10 February 2013, Thomastown won the championship following a 2–17 to 2–14 defeat of Fullen Gaels in the final at Croke Park.

Thomastown's Michael Donnelly was the championship's top scorer with 0-40.

== Connacht Junior Club Hurling Championship ==
=== Connacht semi-final ===
29 October 2012 Semi-final	Cluainín Iomáint	0-07 - 3-09	Calry/St. Joseph's	Páirc Seán Mac Diarmada
	G Hickey (0–5), M Dolan (0–1), N McLoughlin (0-1).		C Griffin (2–0), R Cox (1–2), K Raymond (0–5), D Burke (0–2), K Gilmartin (0–1).

=== Connacht final ===
10 November 2012 Final	Calry/St. Joseph's	1-12 - 1-11	Skehana	Connacht GAA Centre
	K Raymond (1-9), L Reidy (0-1), C Griffin (0-1), D Cox (0-1).		J Glynn (0-6), M Connolly (1-0), N Carty (0-2); B Costello (0-1), J Fahy (0-1), E Quinn (0-1).

== Leinster Junior Club Hurling Championship ==
=== Leinster first round ===
21 October 2012 First round	Maynooth	0-11 - 0-09	St. Sylvester's	Conneff Park

21 October 2012 First round	Lusmagh	4-21 - 0-11	Clonguish	Lusmagh Grounds
			J O'Brien 0-9, B Burke 0-2.

28 October 2012 First round	Rathmolyon	2-11 - 0-11	Éire Óg	St. Loman's Park
	M Cole 1-4, G Cole 1-0, K Fagan 0-1, T Lynch 0-1, M Lynch 0-1, J Fagan 0-1.

=== Leinster quarter-finals ===
4 November 2012 Quarter-final	Rathmolyon	3-13 - 2-04	Crookedwood	St. Loman's Park
	J Fagan 2-3, J Farrell 0-5, T Lynch 1-0, M Cole 0-1, M Lynch 0-1, G Cole 0-1, Gary Doherty 0-1, K Fagan 0-1.		J Orme 2-1, B O'Mara 0-2, S McGovern 0-1.

4 November 2012 Quarter-final	Maynooth	1-11 - 1-14	Naomh Éanna	Conneff Park
	M Cummins (1-5, 0-5 frees), F Lohan (0-2), G Kenny (0-1); F Molloy (0-1), S Higgins (0-1), K Ennis (0-1).	Report	C McDonald (1-4), J Kenny (0-5, 4 frees), P Doyle (0-3, 1 free), T Stafford (0-1); M Murphy (0-1).

4 November 2012 Quarter-final	St Fintan's, Colt	1-16 - 2-07	Pearse Óg	Páirc Shéain Uí hUidhrín
	C Murray (1-2, 0-2f), C Kavanagh (0-5, 1f), S Mullins (0-2), H Keyes (0-1), G Parkinson (0-1), M Holland (0-1), B McDermott (0-1f), B O’Connor (0-1), D Dalton (0-1), O Joyce (0-1).	Report	G Smyth (1-5, 0-1 ‘65, 0-1f), S Callan (1-0); M Boland (0-1), A Callan (0-1).

11 November 2012 Quarter-final	Lusmagh	0-07 - 0-17	Thomastown	Lusmagh Grounds
	E Kelly 0-4, A Kelly 0-2, E Quinlan 0-1.		M Donnelly 0-9, JJ Farrell 0-2, D Walsh 0-2, D Burke 0-1, S Waugh 0-1, D Waugh 0-1, A Burke 0-1.

=== Leinster semi-finals ===
17 November 2012 Final	Rathmolyon	1-11 - 1-08	St Fintan's, Colt	St. Loman's Park
	G Cole 1-3, J Fagan 0-3, M Lynch 0-2, J Farrell 0-1, D Morgan 0-1, E Regan 0-1.		S Mullins 1-1, B Keegan 0-2, C Kavanagh 0-2, N Brennan 0-1, H Keyes 0-1, M Holland 0-1.

18 November 2012 Final	Thomastown	0-10 - 1-24	Naomh Éanna	Páirc Uí Shíocháin
	J Kenny 0-5, P Doyle 0-3, C McDonald 0-1, N Kirwan 0-1.		M Donnelly 0-9, JJ Farrell 0-5, D Burke 0-5, T O'Hanrahan 1-1, S Waugh 0-2, D Walsh 0-1, J Hoyne 0-1.

=== Leinster final ===
2 December 2012 Final	Rathmolyon	1-07 - 2-13	Thomastown	Páirc Tailteann
	G Cole (1-3); J Farrell (0-4).		M Donnelly (0-6), T O'Hanrahan (1-2), J J Farrell (0-4), Dessie Walsh (0-1).

== Munster Junior Club Hurling Championship ==
=== Munster quarter-final ===
10 November 2012 Quarter-final	St. Kieran's	0-14 - 1-02	Kilsheelan-Kilcash	Feenagh
	D Nolan 0-9 (6fs, 1 65), A Molyneaux, R Cahill, J Muckell, JB Harnett, D Treacy 0-1.	Report	E Sweeney 1-0, A Harte (f), J Roche 0-1.

=== Munster semi-finals ===
18 November 2012 Semi-final	Butlerstown	0-11 - 4-19	Kildorrery	Waterford IT Grounds
	Jim Power 0-8 (4fs), R Barron, John Power, T Costello 0-1 each.	Report	P O’Brien 2-9 (1-7fs, 1 65), D Kelly 0-5 (1f), E O’Connor 1-1, F Stapleton 1-0, W Fouhy 0-3, S Kelly 0-1.

18 November 2012 Semi-final	Kenmare Shamrocks	1-07 - 1-11	St. Kieran's	FitzGerald Stadium
	S O’Regan 1-5 (5fs), S O’Sullivan and L O’Shea 0-1 each.	Report	D Nolan 0-7 (6fs), I MacKessy 1-0, A Molyneaux 0-2, J McCarthy, R Cahill 0-1.

=== Munster final ===
9 December 2012 Final	Kildorrery	1-11 - 0-12	St. Kieran's	Mallow GAA Complex
	P O’Brien 1-6 (0-4f), E O’Connor 0-2, D Kelly, R McEniry, F Stapleton 0-1 each.		J McCarthy, I Mackessy (0-3f) 0-3 each, D Nolan (0-1f), J Muckell (0-1 penalty) 0-2 each, R Cahill, D Treacy 0-1 each.

== Ulster Junior Club Hurling Championship ==
=== Ulster preliminary round ===
29 September 2012 Preliminary round	Bredagh	3-16 - 0-06	Lisnaskea Emmetts

=== Ulster quarter-finals ===
7 October 2012 Quarter-final	Strabane Shamrocks	0-14 - 1-07	Seán MacCumhaills	Sigerson Park

7 October 2012 Quarter-final	Na Magha	3-16 - 3-10	Clontibret	Watty Graham Park

7 October 2012 Quarter-final	St. Enda's	1-12 - 0-14	Derrynoose	Casement Park

7 October 2012 Quarter-final	Bredagh	5-25 - 1-10	Ballymachugh	Páirc Esler

=== Ulster semi-finals ===
14 October 2012 Semi-final	Strabane Shamrocks	2-12 - 5-10	Na Magha	Dean McGlinchey Park
	M Keane 1-7, M Devine 1-1, G Gilmore 0-2, P O'Connor 0-1, M Quigg 0-1.

14 October 2012 Semi-final	St. Enda's	2-08 - 3-18	Bredagh	Dean McGlinchey Park

=== Ulster final ===
28 October 2012 Final	Bredagh	4-18 - 3-07	Na Magha	Casement Park
	L McMullan 1-7, M Scullin 2-2, P Kelly 1-1, D Hughes, I Galway (2f), (0-3 each), P Doole, A Donaghy, 0-1 each.	Report	D Shiels 1-2, A Grant, T Duban 1-0 each, D Foley 0-2, B Quigley, D Connelly, S O'Donnell 0-1 each.

== All-Ireland Junior Club Hurling Championship ==
=== All-Ireland quarter-final ===
1 December 2012 Quarter-final	Fullen Gaels	0-17 - 0-12 (aet)	Calry/St. Joseph's	Páirc na hÉireann
	R Power (0-12), R McEntee (0-2), P Duggan (0-1), B Maloney (0-1), J O'Dwyer (0-1).		K Raymond (0-6), D Burke (0-2), K Gilmartin (0-2); L Reidy (0-1), D Keown (0-1).

=== All-Ireland semi-finals ===
27 January 2013 Semi-final	Fullen Gaels	1-12 - 1-04	Bredagh	Parnells Grounds
	R Power 0-8 (4f), R McEntee 1-0, S Lawless, S Wallace, A Morrissey, P Duggan 0-1 each.		I Galway 1-4 (1-3f, 0-1 ‘65’)

27 January 2013 Semi-final	Thomastown	3-14 - 1-13	Kildorrery	Leahy Park
	M Donnelly 0-8 (5f, 1’65’), JJ Farrell 1-5, S Waugh 1-0, T O’Hanrahan 1-0, D Waugh 0-1.	Report	P O’Brien 0-8 (5f), A O’Brien 1-1, D Kelly 0-2, J McCarthy 0-1, W Fouhy 0-1.

=== All-Ireland final ===
10 February 2013 Final	Thomastown	2–17 - 2–14	Fullen Gaels	Croke Park
	M Donnelly 0–8 (5f, 2 '65'), D Burke, T O'Hanrahan 1–2 each, S Waugh 0–2, D Waugh, J Farrell, D Walsh 0–1 each.	Report	R Power 1–9 (0-8f), A O'Neill 1–0, S Lawless 0–2, R McEntee, B Moloney, A Morrissey 0–1 each.	Referee: G Duffy (Antrim)
