= 2005–06 All-Ireland Junior Club Hurling Championship =

Sports season

All Ireland Champions
- Winners: Fr. O'Neill's (1st win)
- Captain: Ger Holland

All Ireland Runners-up
- Runners-up: Erin's Own

Provincial Champions
- Munster: Fr. O'Neill's
- Leinster: Erin's Own
- Ulster: Castleblayney
- Connacht: Skehana

The 2005–06 All-Ireland Junior Club Hurling Championship was the third staging of the All-Ireland Junior Club Hurling Championship since its establishment by the Gaelic Athletic Association in 2002.

The All-Ireland final was played on 12 February 2006 at Croke Park in Dublin, between Fr. O'Neill's from Cork and Erin's Own from Carlow, in what was their first ever meeting in the final. Fr. O'Neill's won the match by 2-16 to 2-10 to claim their first ever All-Ireland title.

== Connacht Junior Club Hurling Championship ==
=== Connacht final ===
19 November 2005 Final	St Mary's, Carrick (Leitrim)	1-06 - 5-10	Skehana (Galway)	Páirc Seán Mac Diarmada
	J Glancy 1-4, V McDermott 0-1, F Carroll 0-1.		P Kelly 3-0, J Glynn 1-3, F Finnerty 1-0, E Quinn 0-3, S Mannion 0-2, J Fahy 0-1, D Costello 0-1.

== Leinster Junior Club Hurling Championship ==
=== Leinster first round ===
5 November 2005 First round	Shillelagh (Wicklow)	1-04 - 2-15	Thomastown (Kilkenny)	Shillelagh Grounds
	S Byrne 1-0, K Byrne 0-3, M Slye 0-1.		P Treacy 2-1, B O'Keeffe 0-8, JJ Farrell 0-3, D Lanigan 0-2, D Brennan 0-1.

5 November 2005 First round	St Fintan's, Colt (Laois)	2-08 - 1-08	Carrig & Riverstown (Offaly)	Páirc Shéain Uí hUidhrín
	B Keegan 1-0, C Murray 1-0, J Farrell 0-3, B McDermott 0-3, B O'Connor 0-1, A Dunne 0-1.		J Larkin 0-5, B England 1-0, K O'Brien 0-2, A Deane 0-1.

12 November 2005 First round	Kilcock (Kildare)	1-07 - 1-11	Crookedwood (Westmeath)	Kilcock Grounds
	M Mahony 1-1, D Maguire 0-3 A Gavin 0-3.		J Orme 1-8, G Boyhan 0-1, K Tormey 0-1, F Brennan 0-1.

=== Leinster quarter-finals ===
12 November 2005 Quarter-final	Erin's Owns (Carlow)	2-13 - 0-08	Blackhall Gaels (Meath)	McGrath Park
	J Miley 0-7, G Doyle 1-2, J Rogers 1-0, B Mullins 0-2, C Cody 0-2.		D O'Loughlin 0-7, J Meyler 0-1.

12 November 2005 Quarter-final	St Fintan's, Colt (Laois)	1-15 - 2-13	St Mark's (Dublin)	Páirc Shéain Uí hUidhrín
			D O'Callaghan 1-11.

12 November 2005 Quarter-final	Thomastown (Kilkenny)	3-19 - 3-05	Davidstown (Wexford)	Thomastown Grounds
	B O'Keeffe 0-7, F Challoner 2-0, D Walsh 0-5, D Brennan 0-4, P Treacy 1-1, D Dempsey 0-1, R Bolger 0-1.		G Jacob 1-1, J Delaney 0-3, P Delaney 1-0, G Martin 0-1.

19 November 2005 Quarter-final	Crookedwood (Westmeath)	4-08 - 0-03	Pearse Óg (Louth)	Crookedwood Grounds

=== Leinster semi-finals ===
19 November 2005 Semi-final	St Mark's (Dublin)	2-09 - 2-11	Erin's Owns (Carlow)	McGee Park

26 November 2005 Semi-final	Crookedwood (Westmeath)	0-08 - 4-11	Thomastown (Kilkenny)	Crookedwood Grounds
	J Orme 0-5, E Murray 0-1, C Murray 0-1, C Duffy 0-1.		P Treacy 1-4, JJ Farrell 2-0, B O'Keeffe 0-3, D Lanigan 1-0, D Brennan 0-2, R Bolger 0-1, F Challender 0-1.

=== Leinster final ===
3 December 2005 Final	Erin's Owns (Carlow)	3-14 - 3-09 (aet)	Thomastown (Kilkenny)	McGrath Park
	C Doyle 1-5, E Minchin 1-2, A Elliot 1-1, J Miley 0-3, F Byrne 0-1, E Somers 0-1, J Rogers 0-1.	Report	B O'Keeffe 0-7, JJ Farrell 2-0, P Treacy 1-0, R Bulger 0-1, D Walsh 0-1.

== Munster Junior Club Hurling Championship ==
=== Munster quarter-finals ===
12 November 2005 Quarter-final	Kenmare Shamrocks (Kerry)	1-06 - 1-10	Knockshegowna (Tipperary)	Templenoe Grounds
	E Hussey 1-0, P Randles 0-2, L O'Shea 0-2, M O'Sullivan 0-1, J Wharton 0-1.		M Kennedy 1-3, K Gohery 0-2, R Killeen 0-2, D Costello 0-2, B Noonan 0-1.

13 November 2005 Quarter-final	Meelick (Clare)	0-11 - 1-11	Hospital-Herbertstown (Limerick)	Wolfe Tone Park
	R Conlon 0-7, J O'Connor 0-2, P Madden 0-1, C O'Connell 0-1.		M Fitzgerald 0-5, D Reale 0-4, S Reale 1-0, J McAuliffe 0-1, R O'Donovan 0-1.

=== Munster semi-finals ===
27 November 2005 Semi-final	Knockshegowna (Tipperary)	0-12 - 0-07	Brickey Rangers (Waterford)	MacDonagh Park
	M Kennedy 0-5, K Gohery 0-3, G Gohery 0-3, R Killeen 0-1.		F Nugent 0-3, I McCarthy 0-1, C McGrath 0-1, T Landers 0-1.

27 November 2005 Semi-final	Hospital-Herbertstown (Limerick)	0-08 - 1-07	Fr O'Neill's (Cork)	FitzGerald Park
	A Garvey 0-4, D Reale 0-2, M Fitzgerald 0-1, R O'Donovan 0-1.		G O'Leary 1-2, J Flavin 0-3, G Holland 0-2.

=== Munster final ===
4 December 2005 Final	Fr O'Neill's (Cork)	1-12 - 0-07	Knockshegowna (Tipperary)	Gaelic Grounds
	G O'Leary 0-6, E Conway 1-2, G Holland 0-2, K Wall 0-1, B Murphy 0-1.		D Costelloe 0-5, K Gohery 0-1, M Kennedy 0-1.

== Ulster Junior Club Hurling Championship ==
=== Ulster quarter-finals ===
2 October 2005 Quarter-final	Derrynoose (Armagh)	2-06 - 1-11	Strabane Shamrocks (Tyrone)	St Oliver Plunkett Park

2 October 2005 Quarter-final	Burt (Donegal)	5-13 - 0-05	Darragh Cross (Down)	Fr Tierney Park
	R McLaughlin 4-2, S McDaid 1-3, M McCann 0-4, E McDermott, 0-1, C Dowds, 0-1, S Murphy 0-1.

2 October 2005 Quarter-final	Mullahoran (Cavan)	0-02 - 4-12	Castleblayney Hurling Club (Monaghan)	Ó Raghallaigh Park

2 October 2005 Quarter-final	St Teresa's (Antrim)	0-14 - 2-09	Lisnaskea Emmetts (Fermanagh)	Casement Park
	P Maguire 0-7, R Gallagher 0-3, L Madden 0-2, C McGoldrick 0-1.		J McManus 1-4, K Smith 1-0, C McManus 0-2, D Graham 0-2, E Gunn 0-1.

=== Ulster semi-finals ===
16 October 2005 Semi-final	Castleblayney Hurling Club (Monaghan)	2-11 - 0-10	Burt (Donegal)	Dungannon Grounds
	M McHugh 0-6, R Woods 1-2, P Conlon 1-0, G Boyd 0-1, S Lambe 0-1, A Lambe 0-1.		M McCann 0-4, J Boyle 0-2, M McGrath 0-1, M Wallace 0-1, S McDaid 0-1, J McGrath 0-1.

16 October 2005 Semi-final	Lisnaskea Emmetts (Fermanagh)	1-12 - 3-09	Strabane Shamrocks (Tyrone)	St Molaise Park

=== Ulster final ===
29 October 2005 Final	Strabane Shamrocks (Tyrone)	1-08 - 2-15	Castleblayney Hurling Club (Monaghan)	Páirc Uí Dhonnaile

== All-Ireland Junior Club Hurling Championship ==
=== All-Ireland quarter-final ===
20 November 2005 Quarter-final	Castleblayney Hurling Club (Monaghan)	2-09 - 3-03	Thomas McCurtains (London)	St Mary's Park
	R Woods 2-3.

=== All-Ireland semi-finals ===
29 January 2006 Semi-final	Erin's Own (Carlow)	2-06 - 1-06	Skehana (Galway)	St Rynagh's Park
	B Mullins 1-1, C Coady 1-0, J Miley 0-3, C Doyle 0-1, E Somers 0-1.		P Kelly 1-1, J Glynn 0-4, F Finnerty 0-1.

29 January 2006 Semi-final	Fr O'Neill's (Cork)	4-15 - 0-08	Castleblayney Hurling Club (Monaghan)	Dr Cullen Park
	E Conway 1-5, J Flavin 1-3, P Butler 1-2, Q Higgins 1-0, G Holland 0-2, E Holland 0-2, B O'Driscoll 0-1.		R Woods 0-5, A Lambe 0-1, P Conlon 0-1, P Murphy 0-1.	Referee: D Connolly (Kilkenny)

=== All-Ireland final ===
12 February 2006 Final	Fr O'Neill's (Cork)	2–16 – 2–10	Erin's Own (Carlow)	Croke Park
	G O'Leary 0-8, J Flavin 1-2, E Conway 1-1, E Holland 0-3, G Holland 0-1, P Butler 0-1.		C Doyle 1-4, E Somers 1-1, J Miley 0-3, A Elliot 0-1, E Minchin 0-1.	Referee: G Devlin (Armagh)

== Championship statistics ==
=== Miscellaneous ===
- Erin's Own became the first Carlow club to win a Leinster Championship title in any grade.
