= 2016–17 All-Ireland Junior Club Hurling Championship =

Championship Details
- Dates: 2 October 2016 – 18 February 2017
- Teams: 30

All Ireland Champions
- Winners: Mayfield (1st win)
- Captain: Shane O'Donovan
- Manager: Séamus Lawton

All Ireland Runners-up
- Runners-up: Mooncoin
- Captain: Cormac Fleming
- Manager: Joe Murphy

Provincial Champions
- Munster: Mayfield
- Leinster: Mooncoin
- Ulster: Lámh Dhearg
- Connacht: Calry/St. Joseph's

Championship Statistics
- Matches Played: 29
- Total Goals: 86 (2.96 per game)
- Total Points: 727 (25.06 per game)
- Top Scorer: Nicky Kelly (1-43)

The 2016–17 All-Ireland Junior Club Hurling Championship was the 14th staging of the All-Ireland Junior Club Hurling Championship, the Gaelic Athletic Association's junior inter-county club hurling tournament. The championship began on 2 October 2016 and ended on 18 February 2017.

The All-Ireland final was played on 18 February 2017 at Croke Park in Dublin, between Mayfield from Cork and Mooncoin from Kilkenny, in what was their first ever meeting in the final. Mayfield won the match by 2-16 to 1-18 to claim their first ever championship title.

Mayfield's Nicky Kelly was the championship's top scorer with 1-43.

== Connacht Junior Club Hurling Championship ==
=== Connacht semi-final ===
31 October 2016 Semi-final	Cluainín Iomáint	2–07 – 4–06	Calry/St. Joseph's	Páirc Seán Mac Diarmada
			K Raymond 0-4, M O'Callaghan 1-0, M Gilmartin 1-0, D Keown 1-0, K Gilmartin 1-0, E McCarthy 0-2.

=== Connacht final ===
6 November 2016 Final	Calry/St. Joseph's	3–09 – 2–10	Mícheál Breathnach	Connacht COE
	K Raymond 0–7 (6f, 65), M Gilmartin 2–0, D Keown 1–1, K Gilmartin 0–1.	Report	B Ó Conghaile 1–4, C Ó Griallis 1–4 (3f), A Ó Finneadha 0–1, M Ó Conghaile 0–1.	Referee: K McGeeney (Roscommon)

== Leinster Junior Club Hurling Championship ==
=== Leinster first round ===
22 October 2016 First round	St Oliver Plunkett's	1–24 – 2–09	Kiltegan	St Oliver Plunkett's Park
	C Curley 1-6, P Lynam 0-4, D Kiernan 0-4, C O'Leary 0-2, C Lynch 0-2, J Dooley 0-1, A Craig 0-1, R Corroon 0-1, N Gavin 0-1, S Maguire 0-1, S Donoher 0-1.		J Birmingham 2-1, S Germaine 0-5, M Murphy 0-2, P Byrne 0-1.

22 October 2016 First round	Ratoath	2–20 – 2–09	Carlow Town	Seán Eiffe Park
	P O'Hanrahan 1-8, P Coady 1-2, C O'Hanrahan 0-3, B McMahon 0-3, S O'Hanrahan 0-1.		K English 0-7, D English 1-2, B English 1-0.

29 October 2016 First round	Rosenallis	3–16 – 0–12	Maynooth	Rosenallis Ground
	P Keating 1-8, R Murphy 1-2, W Murphy 1-1, B Fitzpatrick 0-2, S Kelly 0-1, S Smith 0-1, F Fennell 0-1.		C Forde 0-9, K Dunne 0-1, J Millett 0-1, C Hobbs 0-1.

29 October 2016 First round	St Fechin's	3–17 – 3–05	Wolfe Tones	Gaelic Grounds
	S Conneely 2-4, D Stephenson 0-8, B Devlin 1-0, P Mathews 0-2, M Ryan 0-2, N Devlin 0-1.		P Cullen 2-0, M Coyle 1-0, J Newman 0-3, S Noonan 0-2.

=== Leinster quarter-finals ===
5 November 2016 Quarter-final	St Fechin's	0–10 – 1–19	Mooncoin	Gaelic Grounds
	P McCormack 0-6, D Stephenson 0-2, V Hynes 0-1, S Connelly 0-1.		K Crowley 0-6, E Hennebry 1-2, S Wall 0-3, R Wall 0-2, M Grace 0-2, P Walsh 0-1, C Fleming 0-1, C Daly 0-1, J Fitzgerald 0-1.

5 November 2016 Quarter-final	St Oliver Plunkett's	2–12 – 1–11	St. James's	St Oliver Plunkett's Park
	P Lynam 0-6, C Curley 1-2, G Gavin 1-0, C Lynch 0-1, D Kiernan 0-1, A Craig 0-1, J Dooley 0-1.		K O'Grady 0-9, M O'Hanlon 1-0, B Molloy 0-1, R Barron 0-1.

5 November 2016 Quarter-final	Ratoath	1–13 – 2–08	Clodiagh Gaels	Seán Eiffe Park
	P O'Hanrahan 0-6, G McGowan 1-1, D Kelly 0-3, S O'Hanrahan 0-1, J McGowan 0-1, C O'Hanrahan 0-1.		K Kinahan 2-0, L Langton 0-3, C Gleeson 0-1, S Dolan 0-1, C Keenaghan 0-1, D Dunne 0-1, C Curran 0-1.

12 November 2016 Quarter-final	Rosenallis	0–16 – 0–07	Clontarf	Rosenallis Ground
	P Keating 0-6, R Murray 0-4, J Lennon 0-3, J Keating 0-2, S Kelly 0-1.		R McDyer 0-3, B Forde 0-1, E Cronin 0-1, C Cronin 0-1, F Maher 0-1.

=== Leinster semi-finals ===
19 November 2016 Semi-final	Mooncoin	2–11 – 1–07	St Oliver Plunkett's	Nowlan Park
	M Grace (0-4); E Hennebry (1-0); R Wall (1-0, penalty); C Fleming (0-3, two frees); J Fitzgerald (0-2); K Crowley (0-1, free); S Walsh (0-1).	Report	P Lynam (1-4, goal 65, three points frees); G Gavin, C Curley, S Donoher (0-1 each).

26 November 2016 Semi-final	Ratoath	1–20 – 1–16 (aet)	Rosenallis	Seán Eiffe Park
	P O'Hanrahan 0-7, G McGowan 0-6, D Kelly 0-4, P Coady 1-0, S Keogh 0-1, B McGowan 0-1, C O'Hanrahan 0-1.	Report	P Keating 0-5, W Murphy 1-1, R Murphy 0-2, J Lennon 0-2, S Kelly 0-2, S Smith 0-1, B Fitzpatrick 0-1, C Fennell 0-1, J Keating 0-1.

=== Leinster final ===
3 December 2016 Final	Mooncoin	1–16 – 0–12	Ratoath	Nowlan Park
	Eamon Hennebry (1–2), K Crowley (0–5, 4f), R Wall (0–3, 1f), A Walsh (0–3), C Daly (0–1), P Hennebry (0–1), K Kirwan (0–1).	Report	P O'Hanrahan (0–6, 4f), G McGowan (0–2), C O'Hanrahan (0–2), B McGowan (0–1), B McMahon (0–1).	Referee: P Murphy

== Munster Junior Club Hurling Championship ==
=== Munster quarter-finals ===
29 October 2016 Quarter-final	Ballyduff Lower	0–15 – 0–05	Kilgarvan	Walsh Park
	J Lyons 0–4; E Cummins 0–3; Brian Power (2fs), D Cheasty 0–2 each; C Dunphy, J Kennedy, D Reade (s-l), R Coffey O’Shea 0–1 each.	Report	S Godfrey 0–4 (1f, 1 65’); J M Foley 0–1 (1f).	Referee: N Wall (Cork)

30 October 2016 Quarter-final	St. Patrick's	2–02 – 4–34	Mayfield	Gaelic Grounds
	R Reale (2–0), J Mullins (0–2, frees).	Report	S Duggan (2–6), N Kely (0–9 ,1 free), S Kelly (1–2), K Walsh, I Looney (0–4 each), P Duggan (1–1), D O’Neill, K Punch, D Hayes (0–2 each), C O’Sullivan, S O’Donovan (0–1 each).	Referee: T Walsh (Waterford)

=== Munster semi-finals ===
12 November 2016 Semi-final	Ballyduff Lower	0–14 – 0–06	Ballybacon-Grange	Walsh Park
	Brian Power (0-7f), J Kennedy (0–4), D Reade (0–1), C Lyons (0–1), D Cheasty (0–1).	Report	B Cummins (0–2; 0-1f, 0–1 65), A Lonergan (0-1f), G Cronin (0–1), D O’Regan (0–1), T Kirwan (0–1).	Referee: J Murphy (Limerick)

13 November 2016 Semi-final	Mayfield	1–27 – 1–07	Bodyke	Mayfield Grounds
	N Kelly (0–8, four frees), S Duggan (1–5), D O’Neill (0–4), S Kelly and K Punch (0–3 each), R O’Keeffe (pen), G Looney, D Malone and K Walsh (0–1 each).	Report	K Quigley (0–5, four frees), P Fitzgerald (1–0), W Fitzgerald and K Quigley (0–1 each).	Referee: J McCormack (Tipperary)

=== Munster final ===
4 December 2016 Final	Mayfield	2–18 – 3–10	Ballyduff Lower	Mallow GAA Complex
	N Kelly (0–10, 0–6 frees), D O’Neill (1–4), S Duggan (1–2), K Punch and P Duggan (0–1 each).	Report	Brian Power (0–5 frees), J Kennedy (1–1), J Lyons and A Carroll (1–0 each), C Lyons, C Dunphy, D Cheasty and E Cummins (0–1 each).	Referee: D Fox (Clare)

== Ulster Junior Club Hurling Championship ==
=== Ulster quarter-finals ===
2 October 2016 Quarter-final	Liatroim	2–16 – 1–08	Naomh Colum Cille	Newcastle

2 October 2016 Quarter-final	Seán Treacy's	1–11 – 1–12	Lámh Dhearg	St. Oliver Plunkett Park
			D Nugent 0-5.

2 October 2016 Quarter-final	Na Magha	1–13 – 1–17	Seán MacCumhaills	Celtick Park
	B Quigley (1-3), D Foley (0-6, 4f), B Douban (0-2); D Connolly (0-1), A Grant (0-1).	Report	L Henderson (0-10, 5f, 1 sixty-five), C Gallagher (0-5), G Gilmore (1-1), S Curran (0-1).

16 October 2016 Quarter-final	Cootehill Celtic	0–05 – 7–19	Inniskeen Grattans	Hugh O'Reilly Park
	A Fitzpatrick 0-2, F Hughes 0-2, C Carney 0-1.		C Faul 4-1, T Campbell 3-1, R Meegan 0-6, D Meegan 0-4, M Murphy 0-2, D McGahon 0-2, C McKinley 0-2, J Dooley 0-1.

=== Ulster semi-finals ===
9 October 2016 Semi-final	Seán MacCumhaills	2–13 – 2–11	Liatroim	Watty Graham Park
	L Henderson (0-10, 8f, 1 ‘65), D White (2-0), G Gilmore (0-3).	Report

23 October 2016 Semi-final	Lámh Dhearg	1–12 – 2–06	Inniskeen Grattans	O'Neill Park
	D Nugent 0-9, A McGuigan 1-0, P Mervyn 0-1, D Lynch 0-1, T McCrudden 0-1.		T Campbell 2-0, R Meegan 0-3, PJ Boyle 0-1, P Meegan 0-1.

=== Ulster final ===
30 October 2016 Final	Lámh Dhearg	0–16 – 0–13	Seán MacCumhaills	Owenbeg COE
	D Nugent 0–11 (9f), T McCrudden 0–2, D Lynch 0–1, B McComb 0–1, P Mervyn 0–1.	Report	L Henderson 0–10 (frees), M O’Reilly 0–2, G Gilmore 0–1.	Referee: B Winters

== All-Ireland Junior Club Hurling Championship ==
=== All-Ireland quarter-final ===
19 November 2016 Quarter-final	Fullen Gaels	0–09 – 2–12	Calry/St. Joseph's	Páirc na hÉireann
	S Jennings (0-4), P Duggan (0-2), V Morrissey (0-1), N Urwin (0-1), T Dunne (0-1).		M O'Callaghan (2-0), K Raymond (0-6), K Gilmartin (0-2), D Cox (0-2), M Gilmartin (0-1), M Larkin (0-1).	Referee: M Murtagh

=== All-Ireland semi-finals ===
29 January 2017 Semi-final	Mayfield	1–14 – 1–07	Calry/St. Joseph's	O'Connor Park
	N Kelly (1–5, 0–3 frees); D O’Neill (0–4); K Punch (0–3); D Hayes, D Malone (0–1 each).	Report	K Raymond (0–6 frees); C Griffin (1–1).

29 January 2017 Semi-final	Mooncoin	5–11 – 0–08	Lámh Dhearg	St. Loman's Park
	J Fitzgerald (2–1), M Grace (2–0), R Wall (0–4), K Crowley (0–4, 3fs), Eamonn Hennebry (1–0), S Walsh (0–1), C Fleming (0–1).	Report	P Cunningham (0–6, 5fs), T McCrudden (0–1), M Herron (0–1, f).

=== All-Ireland final ===
18 February 2017 Final	Mayfield	2–16 – 1–18	Mooncoin	Croke Park
	D Malone (1–2), P Duggan (1–0), N Kelly (0–11,6 frees), S Duggan, D O’Neill, K Punch (0–1 each).	Report	J Fitzgerald (1–1), K Crowley (0–8, 5 frees, 1 ’65), E Hennebry (0–3), A Walsh, R Wall (0–2 each), M Grace, P Walsh (0–1 each).	Referee: C Cunning (Antrim)

== Championship statistics ==
=== Top scorers ===
Overall

Rank	Player	Club	Tally	Total	Matches	Average
1	Nicky Kelly	Mayfield	1-43	46	5	9.20
2	Pádraig O'Hanrahan	Ratoath	1-27	30	4	7.50
2	Lee Henderson	Seán MacCumhaills	0-30	30	3	10.00
4	Shane Duggan	Mayfield	4-14	26	5	5.20
5	Domhnall Nugent	Lámh Dhearg	0-25	25	4	6.25
6	Kevin Crowley	Mooncoin	0-24	24	5	4.80
7	Keith Raymond	Calry/St Joseph's	0-23	23	4	5.75
8	Paddy Keating	Rosenallis	1-19	22	3	7.33
9	Éamonn Hennebry	Mooncoin	4-07	19	5	3.80
10	David O'Neill	Mayfield	1-15	18	5	3.60

=== Miscellaneous ===
- Calry/St Joseph's became the first team to win four Connacht Championship titles.
