= 2011–12 All-Ireland Junior Club Hurling Championship =

Championship Details
- Dates: 25 September 2011 – 11 February 2012
- Teams: 27

All Ireland Champions
- Winners: St. Patrick's, Ballyraggett (1st win)
- Captain: Brian Phelan
- Manager: Maurice Aylward

All Ireland Runners-up
- Runners-up: Charleville
- Captain: Danny O'Flynn
- Manager: T. J. Crowley

Provincial Champions
- Munster: Charleville
- Leinster: St. Patrick's, Ballyraggett
- Ulster: Burt
- Connacht: Ballygar

Championship Statistics
- Matches Played: 27
- Total Goals: 61 (2.25 per game)
- Total Points: 607 (22.48 per game)
- Top Scorer: Kevin Kelly (0-32)

The 2011–12 All-Ireland Junior Club Hurling Championship was the ninth staging of the All-Ireland Junior Club Hurling Championship since its establishment by the Gaelic Athletic Association. The championship ran from 25 September 2011 to 11 February 2012.

The All-Ireland final was played on 11 February 2012 at Croke Park in Dublin, between St. Patrick's, Ballyragget from Kilkenny and Charleville from Cork, in what was their first ever meeting in the final. St. Patrick's, Ballyraggett won the match by 1-13 to 1-12 to claim their first ever championship title.

St. Patrick's Ballyraggett's Kevin Kelly was the championship's top scorer with 0-32.

== Connacht Junior Club Hurling Championship ==
=== Connacht semi-finals ===
31 October 2011 Semi-final	Calry/St Joseph's	0-15 - 0-07	Gortletteragh	Markievicz Park
	K Raymond 0-9, D Cox 0-2, R Watters 0-1, C Griffin 0-1, E Doherty 0-1, C Hackett 0-1.

=== Connacht final ===
6 November 2011 Final	Ballygar	2-13 - 1-05	Calry/St Joseph's	Dunlo Grounds
	T Finneran 1-3, E Walsh 1-2, D O'Malley 0-4, N Mannion 0-2, J Hannon 0-1, S Naughton 0-1.		C Griffen 1-0, K Raymond 0-3, K Gilmartin 0-1, D Burke 0-1.	Referee: T Killion (Roscommon)

== Leinster Junior Club Hurling Championship ==
=== Leinster first round ===
15 October 2011 First round	Knockbridge	1-11 - 0-13	Boardsmill	Páirc an Chuinnigh

15 October 2011 First round	Carlow Town	0-13 - 1-07	Maynooth
	R Dunbar 0-9, C Clancy 0-3, S Minnock 0-1.		C Hobbs 1-1, M Cummins 0-3, G Kenny 0-2, F Molloy 0-1.

15 October 2011 First round	St. Patrick's	2-15 - 0-10	Naomh Barróg

=== Leinster quarter-finals ===
29 October 2011 Quarter-final	Carlow Town	0-06 - 2-17	St. Patrick's, Ballyraggett	Dr. Cullen Park
	R Dunbar 0-3, C Clancy 0-2, P McElligott 0-1.		J Brennan 1-4, K Kelly 0-6, S Mooney 1-0, C Delaney 0-2, K Kelly 0-1, B Phelan 0-1, J Gannon 0-1, B Staunton 0-1, S Kenny 0-1.

30 October 2011 Quarter-final	Knockbridge	0-15 - 1-14	Ballyfin	Páirc an Chuinnigh

30 October 2011 Quarter-final	St. Brigid's	0-12 - 1-13	Horeswood	Fr. Eamon O'Brien Park

30 October 2011 Quarter-final	St. Patrick's	1-12 - 4-14	Brosna Gaels	St. Patrick's Park

=== Leinster semi-finals ===
13 November 2011 Semi-final	St. Patrick's, Ballyraggett	2-18 - 1-04	Brosna Gaels	St. Patrick's Park
	K Kelly 0-8, B Staunton 1-2, C Delaney 1-2, M Brennan 0-3, J Brennan 0-2, B Phelan 0-1.		G Halligan 1-0, F Daly 0-2, D Egan 0-1, J Egan 0-1.

13 November 2011 Semi-final	Ballyfin	1-12 - 1-10	Horeswood	O'Moore Park
	M Duff 1-2, JJ McHugh 0-4, S Lowry 0-2, J Horan 0-1, D McGill 0-1, G Lanham 0-1, R Quillinan 0-1.		M O'Hanlon 1-8, P Murphy 0-1, B Hearn 0-1.

=== Leinster final ===
27 November 2011 Final	Ballyfin	1-07 - 0-20	St. Patrick's, Ballyraggett	O'Moore Park
	JJ McHugh 1-2 (1-2 frees ), S Lowry(0-1 free), G Lanham 0-2 each, L Duff 0-1.	Report	K Kelly 0-9 (0-8 frees), J Brennan 0-6 (0-1 free), B Staunton 0-3, J Phelan 0-2, S Mooney 0-1.	Referee: P O'Dwyer (Carlow)

== Munster Junior Club Hurling Championship ==
=== Munster quarter-final ===
20 November 2011 Quarter-final	Kenmare	0-05 - 1-13	Charleville	Fr. Breen Park
	S O' Regan 0-4 (0-4 frees), James Duncan 0-1.	Report	J O' Brien 1-6 (0-3 frees), A Cagney 0.2, D Murphy, M Kavanagh, M Gammell, F O' Callaghan and A O' Connor 0-1 each.

=== Munster semi-finals ===
27 November 2011 Semi-final	Charleville	2-14 - 0-08	Rockswell Rovers	Dr. Mannix Sportsfield
	J O’Brien 1-8 (0-6 frees), M Kavanagh 1-0, M Gammell, G Kelleher, D Murphy, A Cagney and J Casey 0-1 each.	Report	A Moloney 0-5 (0-4 frees), B Shortall, D Byrne and T Flynn 0-1 each.	Referee: D O'Driscoll (Limerick)

27 November 2011 Semi-final	Cappamore	3-10 - 2-06	Ballinameela	Cappamore Grounds
	A Murphy (2-0), T O’Donoghue (0-6, 4f), C Sheehan (1-0), S Ryan (0-1), M Treacy (0-1), B Creamer (0-1), E Gleeson (0-1).	Report	J Curran (1-3, 2f), Brian Phelan (1-0), C Buckley (0-1), Brendan Phelan (0-1), D O’Brien (0-1).	Referee: J O'Brien (Tipperary)

=== Munster final ===
11 December 2011 Final	Charleville	3-15 - 2-08	Cappamore	Mallow GAA Complex
	J O’Brien 1-5 (1f), D Murphy 1-1, A Cagney 1-1, M Kavanagh 0-3, B Dennehy (1f), D O’Flynn 0-2 each, M Gammell 0-1.	Report	T O’Donoghue 1-3 (1f), E Gleeson 1-1, B Creamer, D Deere, S Ryan, J Ryan, 0-1 each.	Referee: F Horgan (Tipperary)

== Ulster Junior Club Hurling Championship ==
=== Ulster preliminary round ===
25 September 2011 Preliminary round	Lisnaskea Emmetts	2-04 - 1-13	Na Magha	Maguiresbridge Grounds
	J McManus 2-3, S Curran 0-1.		B Quigley 0-9, D Connelly 1-2, A Grant 0-1, T Douban 0-1.

=== Ulster quarter-finals ===
2 October 2011 Quarter-final	Na Magha	2-12 - 1-12	Monaghan Harps	Celtic Park
	B Quigley 0-6, A Grant 0-5, D Shiels 1-0, J Temple 1-0, D Connelly 0-1, P Doherty 0-1.		R Lee 1-4, M McKenna 0-5, A Ryan 0-1, P Hannon 0-1,

2 October 2011 Quarter-final	Burt	w/o - scr.	Strabane Shamrocks

2 October 2011 Quarter-final	Carryduff	0-09 - 5-19	Creggan Kickhams	Páirc Esler

=== Ulster semi-finals ===
9 October 2011 Semi-final	Ballymachugh	0-07 - 1-15	Creggan Kickhams	St. Tiernach's Park

23 October 2011 Semi-final	Na Magha	1-09 - 1-12	Burt	Celtic Park
	B Quigley 1-5, A Grant 0-2, T Douban 0-1, P McElhinney 0-1.		J McGrath 1-1, N Campbell 0-4, M McCann 0-3, E McDermott 0-2, K Wilson 0-2.

=== Ulster final ===
6 November 2011 Final	Burt	0-10 - 0-10	Creggan Kickhams	St. Tiernach's Park
	N Campbell 0-6, R McDermott 0-2, M McCann 0-1, J McGrath 0-1.		C McCann 0-7, A McKeown 0-2, M Johnston 0-1.

20 November 2011 Final replay	Burt	2-10 - 0-13	Creggan Kickhams	Athletic Grounds
	R McDermott 1-1, M McCann 1-0, N Campbell 0-6 (5f), J Downey, E McDermott, S Boyle 0-1 each.	Report	C McCann 0-7 (5f), O McCann 0-3, A McKeown, A Maguire, B Maguire 0-1 each.

== All-Ireland Junior Club Hurling Championship ==
=== All-Ireland quarter-final ===
27 November 2011 Quarter-final	Fullen Gaels	4-08 - 2-07	Burt	Páirc na hÉireann
	K Hayes 2-4, C Cafferkey 1-0, P Breen 1-1, K Codd, S Carey, R McEntee 0-1 each.	Report	N Campbell 1-2 (0-2f), M McCann 0-2, E McDermott, S Gillespie, B Harrigan 0-1 each.

=== All-Ireland semi-finals ===
22 January 2012 Semi-final	St. Patrick's Ballyragget	0-17 - 1-10	Ballygar	MacDonagh Park
	K Kelly 0-8 (5fs, 1 65), J Brennan 0-3, B Phelan, B Staunton 0-2 each, M Brennan, J Phelan 0-1 each.		E Walsh 1-5 (5fs), D Nolan, S Lohan (65) 0-2 each, P Quinn 0-1.

22 January 2012 Semi-final	Charleville	1-17 - 0-06	Fullen Gaels	Walsh Park
	J O'Brien 0-7, 03 frees, M Kavanagh 1-1, D Murphy 0-3, 0-1 free, A Cagney 0-3, J Casey, B Dennehy, free, and B Casey 0-1 each	Report	K Codd 0-5 frees, K Hayes 0-1.

=== All-Ireland final ===
11 February 2012 Final	St. Patrick's Ballyragget	1–13 – 1–12	Charleville	Croke Park
	B Staunton 0–5; J Brennan 0–4; S Kenny 1–1; K Kelly, J Gannon, B Phelan, 0–1 each.	Report	M Gammell 1–2; A Cagney 0–4; D O’Flynn 0–2; M Kavanagh, B Dennehy, J Casey, J O’Brien, 0–1 each.	Referee: É Hassan (Derry)
