= Mossie Carroll =

Irish retired sportsperson

Personal information
- Native name: Muiris Ó Cearúil (Irish)
- Born: 13 June 1957 (age 69) Garryspillane, County Limerick
- Occupation: Salesman
- Height: 6 ft 0 in (183 cm)

Sport
- Sport: Hurling
- Position: Centre-back
Clubs
- Years: Club
- 1970s-1980s 1980s 1980s-1990s: Garryspillane; St. Mary's; Garryspillane
Inter-county
- Years: County
- 1976-1980 1981-1982 1983-1986: Limerick; Tipperary; Limerick
Inter-county titles
- Munster titles: 1
- All-Irelands: 0
- NHL: 2
- All Stars: 3

Mossy Carroll (born 13 June 1957 in Garryspillane, County Limerick) is an Irish former hurler who played with his local club Garryspillane and was a member of the Limerick senior inter-county team in the 1970s and 1980s, he also played with Tipperary.

Sporting positions
Preceded by Éamonn Cregan	Limerick Senior Hurling Manager; 2002	Succeeded by Dave Keane
Preceded by Pat Heffernan	Kerry Senior Hurling Manager; 2009	Succeeded by John Meyler
