= Jonjo Farrell =

Kilkenny hurler

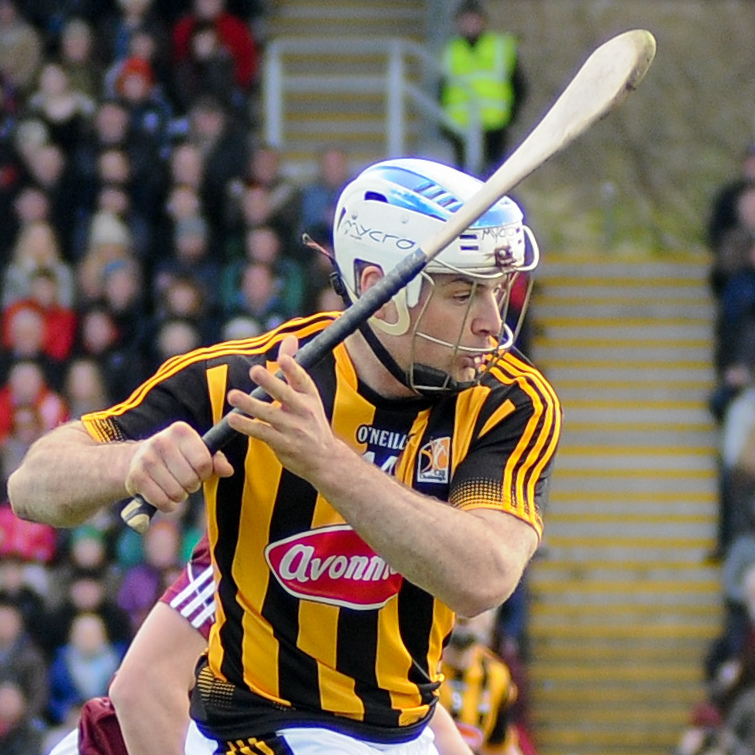
- Jonjo Farrell in action for Kilkenny against Galway in the 2015 National Hurling League at Pearse Stadium

Personal information
- Native name: Seán Seosamh Ó Fearail (Irish)
- Born: 28 September 1988 (age 38) Thomastown, County Kilkenny, Ireland
- Occupation: Secondary school teacher
- Height: 5 ft 9 in (175 cm)

Sport
- Sport: Hurling
- Position: Full-forward
Club
- Years: Club
- Thomastown
Club titles
- Kilkenny titles: 0
Inter-county*
Years	County	Apps (scores)
2014–2017	Kilkenny	3 (1–6)
Inter-county titles
- Leinster titles: 2
- All-Irelands: 2
- NHL: 1
- All Stars: 0
- *Inter County team apps and scores correct as of 21:30, 11 August 2014.

Jonjo Farrell (born 28 September 1988) is an Irish hurler who played as a full-forward at senior level for the Kilkenny county team.

Born in Thomastown, County Kilkenny, Farrell first played competitive hurling during his schooling at St Kieran's College. He arrived on the inter-county scene at the age of seventeen when he first linked up with the Kilkenny minor team, before later joining the under-21 and intermediate sides. He made his senior debut during the 2014 National Hurling League. Farrell went on to join Kilkenny's championship panel.

At club level Farrell is a one-time All-Ireland JHC medallist with Thomastown. In addition to this he has also won one Leinster JHC medal and two county championship medals in the junior grade.

== Personal life ==
Farrell works as a teacher at St Kieran's College and is a former teacher at Abbey community college Ferrybank Kilkenny

== Career statistics ==
As of Match played 11 June 2016.

Team	Year	National League			Leinster		All-Ireland		Total	
Team	Year	Division	Apps	Score	Apps	Score	Apps	Score	Apps	Score
Kilkenny	2014	Division 1A	5	1–3	1	0–0	0	0–0	6	1–3
Kilkenny	2015	Division 1A	5	3–5	1	0–1	0	0–0	6	3–6
Kilkenny	2016	Division 1A	6	1–1	1	1–5	0	0–0	7	2–6
Total			16	4–9	3	1–6	0	0–0	19	6–15

== Honours ==
=== Team ===
St Kieran's College

- All-Ireland Colleges Senior Hurling Championship (1): 2004 (sub)
- Leinster Colleges Senior Hurling Championship (2): 2004 (sub), 2005

Thomastown

- All-Ireland Junior Club Hurling Championship (1): 2013 (c)
- Leinster Junior Club Hurling Championship (1): 2012 (c)
- Kilkenny Junior Hurling Championship (2): 2005, 2012 (c)

Limerick Hurling Club

- Chicago Senior Hurling Championship (1): 2010

Kilkenny

- All-Ireland Senior Hurling Championship (2): 2014 (sub), 2015 (sub)
- Leinster Senior Hurling Championship (2): 2014 (sub), 2016
- National Hurling League (1): 2014 (sub)
- Leinster Intermediate Hurling Championship (3): 2008 (sub), 2009, 2011
- All-Ireland Under-21 Hurling Championship (1): 2008
- Leinster Under-21 Hurling Championship (2): 2008, 2009
- Leinster Minor Hurling Championship (1): 2006

Achievements
Preceded by Brian Phelan (St Patrick's)	All-Ireland Club JHC winning captain 2013	Succeeded by Stephen Colgan (Kickhams Creggan)
