= 2009–10 All-Ireland Junior Club Hurling Championship =

All Ireland Champions
- Winners: Blackrock (1st win)
- Captain: Brendan Hennessy
- Manager: Justin O'Donnell

All Ireland Runners-up
- Runners-up: Naomh Colum Cille
- Captain: Ryan O'Neill
- Manager: Mickey O'Neill

Provincial Champions
- Munster: Blackrock
- Leinster: Blacks and Whites
- Ulster: Naomh Colum Cille
- Connacht: Calry-St Joseph's

The 2009–10 All-Ireland Junior Club Hurling Championship was the seventh staging of the All-Ireland Junior Club Hurling Championship since its establishment by the Gaelic Athletic Association.

The All-Ireland final was played on 13 February 2010 at Croke Park in Dublin, between Blackrock from Limerick and Naomh Colum Cille from Tyrone, in what was their first ever meeting in the final. Blackrock won the match by 1–18 to 0–09 to claim their first ever championship title.

== Connacht Junior Club Hurling Championship ==
=== Connacht final ===
15 November 2009 Final	Calry/St Joseph's	1-09 - 0-10	Skehana	St Brigid's Park
	K Raymond 0-5, S Martyn 1-0, L Reidy 0-2, D Burke 0-2.		J Glynn 0-4, P Kelly 0-2, J McHugh 0-2, F Finnerty 0-1, S Mitchell 0-1.

== Leinster Junior Club Hurling Championship ==
=== Leinster first round ===
17 October 2009 First round	Borris-in-Ossory	2-07 - 0-11	Brosna Gaels	O'Keeffe Park

18 October 2009 First round	Maynooth	0-04 - 2-14	Knockbridge	Páirc Mhuire

18 October 2009 First round	Craanford Fr O'Regan's	2-06 - 2-10	Newcastle	Páirc Uí Shíocháin

18 October 2009 First round	St Patrick's	1-06 - 3-15	St Brigid's	Brother Leo Park

=== Leinster quarter-finals ===
1 November 2009 Quarter-final	Knockbridge	1-10 - 5-15	Blacks and Whites	Páirc an Chuinnigh

1 November 2009 Quarter-final	St Brigid's	0-09 - 1-12	Longwood	Fr Eamon O'Brien Park

1 November 2009 Quarter-final	Newcastle	0-06 - 2-13	Naomh Fionnbarra	Pearse Park

1 November 2009 Quarter-final	Borris-in-Ossory	1-20 - 0-07	Wolfe Tones	O'Keeffe Park

=== Leinster semi-finals ===
15 November 2009 Semi-final	Blacks and Whites	3-24 - 0-05	Longwood	Tom Walsh Park
		Report

15 November 2009 Semi-final	Naomh Fionnbarra	1-14 - 1-13	Borris-in-Ossory	Parnell Park
	S Costello 1-8.	Report

=== Leinster final ===
29 November 2009 Final	Blacks and Whites	2-20 - 1-07	Naomh Fionnbarra	Tom Walsh Park
	N Kennedy 0-9, T Farrell 2-0, P Murphy 0-6, P Cleere 0-2, T Moloney 0-2, P Whelan 0-1.		N Paget 1-0, G Dodril 0-3, I McDonald 0-2, P Dingle 0-1, A Jago 0-1.

== Munster Junior Club Hurling Championship ==
=== Munster quarter-final ===
15 November 2009 Quarter-final	Aherlow	3-20 - 2-15	Tourin	Seán Treacy Park
	C Dillon 0-10, T Fahey 3-0, S Grogan 0-4, Conor O'Shea 0-2, B Reardon 0-2, B Grogan 0-1, Cathal O'Shea 0-1.		D Fives 0-10, M Scanlan 1-1, B Hennessy 1-0, S Fives 0-2, S Leahy 0-1, D Wilkinson 0-1.

=== Munster semi-finals ===
22 November 2009 Semi-final	Blackrock	0-11 - 0-09	Aherlow	Hannon Park
	R McCarthy 0-5, S Hennessy 0-2, D Moloney 0-1, R O'Shaughnessy 0-1, K Palmer 0-1, B O'Shaughnessy 0-1.		C Dillon 0-5, T Hanley 0-1, B Grogan 0-1, C O'Shea 0-1, S Grogan 0-1.

22 November 2009 Semi-final	Kilgarvan	1-08 - 1-12	Fermoy	Kilgarvan Grounds
	M Foley 0-7, F O'Brien 1-0, K O'Sullivan 0-1.		P Shanahan 1-0, F Ryan 0-3, B O'Sullivan 0-3, S Killeen 0-3, A O'Connor 0-2, P Boyce 0-1.

=== Munster final ===
13 December 2009 Final	Fermoy	0-14 - 1-12	Blackrock	Mallow GAA Complex
	B O’Sullivan 0-9 (0-8f), S Killeen 0-2, P Boyce, A O’Connor, M Flynn 0-1 each.	Report	R McCarthy 0-6 (0-4f), A Murphy 1-2, R Murphy (0-1 ’65), R O’Shaughnessy, B O’Shaughnessy, D Moloney 0-1 each.	Referee: S McMahon (Clare)

== Ulster Junior Club Hurling Championship ==
=== Ulster quarter-finals ===
4 October 2009 Quarter-final	Lisnaskea Emmetts	0-12 - 0-08	St Peter's, Warrenpoint	Emmett Park

4 October 2009 Quarter-final	St Mary's, Rasharkin	1-21 - 0-01	Mullahoran

4 October 2009 Quarter-final	Carrickmacross Emmets	1-05 - 5-22	Burt	Pearse Park

4 October 2009 Quarter-final	Naomh Colum Cille	2-12 - 2-05	Na Magha

=== Ulster semi-finals ===
11 October 2009 Semi-final	Naomh Colum Cille	4-12 - 1-04	Lisnaskea Emmetts	O'Neill Park

11 October 2009 Semi-final	St Mary's, Rasharkin	1-10 - 1-08	Burt

=== Ulster final ===
25 October 2009 Final	St Mary's, Rasharkin	2-14 - 4-10	Naomh Colum Cille	Casement Park
	E McNeill 1-4, D McCay 0-6, D Boyle 1-0, E Kelly 0-2, D Quinn 0-1, T McMullan 0-1.		N O'Neill 1-4, P O'Neill 2-0, S O'Hagan 1-1, R O'Neill 0-3, J O'Neill 0-1, T O'Hagan 0-1.	Referee: D Magee (Down)

== All-Ireland Junior Club Hurling Championship ==
=== All-Ireland quarter-final ===
23 January 2010 Quarter-final	Blacks and Whites	4-19 - 0-02	John Mitchel's	Nowlan Park
	P Cleere 2-1, N Kennedy 0-7, T Farrell 1-2, M Ryan 0-5, J Foley 1-0, P Whelan 0-1, P Murphy 0-1, S Kealy 0-1, M Doyle 0-1.		M Morrissey 0-1, M Lyons 0-1.

=== All-Ireland semi-finals ===
24 January 2010 Semi-final	Naomh Colum Cille	2-07 - 0-10	Calry/St Joseph's	Ballyconnell Grounds
	N O'Neill 1-5, R O'Neill 1-0, S McKiver 0-2.		K Raymond 0-8, L Reidy 0-1, D Burke 0-1.

31 January 2010 Semi-final	Blackrock	1-18 - 1-11	Blacks and Whites	Seán Treacy Park
	A Murphy 1-4, R McCarthy 0-6, R O'Shaughnessy 0-3, R Murphy 0-3, D Moloney 0-1, B Hennessy 0-1.		N Kennedy 0-6, T Farrell 1-0, S Kelly 0-2, M Ryan 0-2, P Cleere 0-1.

=== All-Ireland final ===
13 February 2010 Final	Blackrock	1–19 – 0–09	Naomh Colum Cille	Croke Park
	R McCarthy 0-7 (3f), A Murphy 1-1, R McCarthy, K Palmer, R O'Shaughnessy 0-2 each, B Moloney, S Hennessy, D Moloney, N Moloney 0-1 each.	Report	N O'Neill 0-4 (2f, 165)', S McKiver, Ryan O'Neill, Rory O'Neill, J O'Neill, S O'Hagan 0-1 each.

== Championship statistics ==
=== Miscellaneous ===
- Calry/St Joseph's became the first Sligo club to win a provincial title in any grade
- Blacks and Whites became the first club to win two Leinster Championship titles.
