= Bearna/Na Forbacha GAA =

Hurling club in County Galway, Ireland

Bearna/Na Forbacha
- Founded: 1992
- County: Galway
- Colours: Saffron and Blue
- Grounds: Furbo
- Coordinates: 53°15′31″N 9°12′32″W

Playing kits
Standard colours

Bearna/Na Forbacha GAA is a hurling club located in the Barna and Furbo areas of County Galway, Ireland. It is a member of the Galway GAA branch of the Gaelic Athletic Association. The club is exclusively concerned with the sport of hurling.

== Honours ==
- Galway Junior Hurling Championship (1): 2010
- Connacht Junior Club Hurling Championship (1): 2010
- Galway Junior B Hurling Championship (1): 2010
