= 2002–03 All-Ireland Junior Club Hurling Championship =

Championship Details
- Dates: 10 November 2002 – 11 May 2003
- Teams: 17

All Ireland Champions
- Winners: Ballinhassig (1 win)
- Captain: James Aherne
- Manager: Seánie McCarthy

All Ireland Runners-up
- Runners-up: Blacks and Whites
- Captain: Paul Whelan
- Manager: Pat O'Neill

Provincial Champions
- Munster: Ballinhassig
- Leinster: Blacks and Whites
- Ulster: Not Played
- Connacht: Not Played

Championship Statistics
- Matches Played: 19
- Total Goals: 62 (3.26 per game)
- Total Points: 345 (18.15 per game)
- Top Scorer: Declan O'Sullivan (0-21)

The 2002–03 All-Ireland Junior Club Hurling Championship was the inaugural staging of the All-Ireland Junior Club Hurling Championship since its establishment by the Gaelic Athletic Association. The championship ran from 10 November 2002 to 11 May 2003.

The All-Ireland final was played on 11 May 2003 at Walsh Park in Waterford, between Ballinhassig and Blacks and Whites, in what was their first ever meeting in the final. Ballinhassig won the match by 4–15 to 1–06 to claim their first ever championship title.

Ballinhassig's Declan O'Sullivan was the championship's top scorer with 0-21.

== Leinster Junior Club Hurling Championship ==
=== Leinster group 1 ===
==== Group 1 table ====
| | Team | Pld | W | D | L | SF | SA | SD | Pts |
|---|---|---|---|---|---|---|---|---|---|
| 1 | Kevin's | 2 | 2 | 0 | 0 | 48 | 18 | 30 | 4 |
| 2 | Wolfe Tones | 2 | 1 | 0 | 1 | 33 | 29 | 4 | 2 |
| 3 | Knockbridge | 2 | 0 | 0 | 2 | 18 | 52 | -34 | 0 |

==== Group 1 results ====
| 10 November 2002 Round 1 | Knockbridge | 2-07 - 3-11 | Wolfe Tones | Páirc an Chuinnigh |
| | D Dunne 2-1, S Byrne 0-5, E Quigley 0-1. |

| 17 November 2002 Round 2 | Kevin's | 3-23 - 0-05 | Knockbridge | Dolphin Park |

| 24 November 2002 Round 3 | Wolfe Tones | 1-10 - 3-07 | Kevin's | Wolfe Tones GAA Grounds |

=== Leinster group 2 ===
==== Group 2 table ====
| | Team | Pld | W | D | L | SF | SA | SD | Pts |
|---|---|---|---|---|---|---|---|---|---|
| 1 | Ringtown | 2 | 2 | 0 | 0 | 41 | 22 | 19 | 4 |
| 2 | Longford Slashers | 2 | 0 | 1 | 1 | 28 | 35 | -7 | 2 |
| 3 | St. Columba's | 2 | 0 | 1 | 1 | 20 | 32 | -12 | 0 |

==== Group 2 results ====
| 10 November 2002 Round 1 | St. Columba's | 0-13 - 1-10 | Longford Slashers | St. Columba's Park |
| | | | G Ghee 0-7, N Lane 1-0, J Newman 0-3. |

| 17 November 2002 Round 2 | Longford Slashers | 2-09 - 0-22 | Ringtown | Michael Fay Park |

| 24 November 2002 Round 3 | Ringtown | 4-07 - 1-04 | St. Columba's | Ringtown Grounds |

=== Leinster group 3 ===
==== Group 3 table ====
| | Team | Pld | W | D | L | SF | SA | SD | Pts |
|---|---|---|---|---|---|---|---|---|---|
| 1 | Blacks and Whites | 2 | 2 | 0 | 0 | 28 | 15 | 13 | 4 |
| 2 | Kilcotton | 2 | 1 | 0 | 1 | 29 | 23 | 6 | 2 |
| 3 | Confey | 2 | 0 | 0 | 2 | 19 | 38 | -19 | 0 |

==== Group 3 results ====
| 10 November 2002 Round 1 | Blacks and Whites | 1-09 - 1-04 | Kilcotton | Tom Walsh Park |
| | P O'Grady 0-5, J Brennan 1-0, T Farrell 0-3, M Ryan 0-1. | | N Daly 1-3, R Power 0-1. |

| 17 November 2002 Round 2 | Kilcotton | 4-10 - 1-08 | Confey | Green Roads Grounds |
| | R Drennan 2-2, J Fitzpatrick 1-1, N Daly 0-4, R Power 1-0, N Jones 0-3. | | D Whelan 1-0, M Bermingham 0-3, K Divilly 0-2, N Daly 0-1, N Jones 0-1, D Nolan 0-1. |

| 23 November 2002 Round 3 | Confey | 0-08 - 2-10 | Blacks and Whites | Creighton Park |

=== Leinster group 4 ===
==== Group 4 table ====
| | Team | Pld | W | D | L | SF | SA | SD | Pts |
|---|---|---|---|---|---|---|---|---|---|
| 1 | Naomh Eoin | 2 | 2 | 0 | 0 | 25 | 15 | 10 | 4 |
| 2 | St. Martin's | 2 | 1 | 0 | 1 | 21 | 18 | 3 | 2 |
| 3 | Carnew Emmets | 2 | 0 | 0 | 2 | 15 | 28 | -13 | 0 |

==== Group 4 results ====
| 10 November 2002 Round 1 | St. Martin's | 0-07 - 1-08 | Naomh Eoin | St. Martin's Park |
| | M Morrissey 0-2, C Quigley 0-2, S Dempsey 0-2, P Murphy 0-1. | | M Slye 0-7, J Quirke 1-0, A Hoey 0-1. |

| 17 November 2002 Round 2 | Carnew Emmets | 2-01 - 1-11 | St. Martin's | Emmets Grounds |
| | M Murphy 1-0, W Brennan 1-0, T Darcy 0-1. | | M Morrissey 1-1, C Quigley 0-7, C Byrne 0-2, J Stafford 0-1. |

| 24 November 2002 Round 3 | Naomh Eoin | 1-11 - 1-05 | Carnew Emmets | Spellman Park |
| | B Murphy 1-0, M Slye 0-6, C Jordan 0-3, P Quirke 0-1, S Spruhaun 0-1. | | D Myers 1-3, J Kennedy 0-1, W Brennan 0-1. |

=== Leinster semi-finals ===
| 1 December 2002 Semi-final | Ringtown | 0-03 - 2-03 | Kevin's | Ringtown GAA Grounds |
| | V Bateman 0-1, T Cunningham 0-1, A Moran 0-1. | | A Flynn 1-2, D Flannery 1-0, S O'Shea 0-1. |

| 1 December 2002 Semi-final | Blacks and Whites | 2-12 - 0-03 | Naomh Eoin | McGrath Park |
| | N Kennedy 1-4, M Ryan 1-1, T Farrell 0-3, J Doyle 0-3, P O'Grady 0-1. | | M Slye 0-3. | Referee: J Owens (Wexford) |

=== Leinster final ===
| 8 December 2002 Final | Blacks and Whites | 4–08 – 3–07 | Kevin's | Tom Walsh Park |
| | D Whelan 3-0, T Farrell 1-2, N Kennedy 0-4, J Doyle 0-1, P O'Grady 0-1. | | A Flynn 2-5, S O'Shea 1-0, A Doyle 0-2. | Referee: S Whelan (Wexford) |

== Munster Junior Club Hurling Championship ==
=== Munster quarter-final ===
| 16 February 2003 Semi-final | Kildimo-Pallaskenry | 2–13 – 2–05 (aet) | Éire Óg, Inis | Childers Road |
| | J Chawke 0-12, R McKeogh 2-0, T McCalvery 0-1. | | J Brennan 0-4, B McMahon 1-0, T Corbett 1-0, R Eadie 0-1. |

=== Munster semi-finals ===
| 22 February 2003 Semi-final | Kildimo-Pallaskenry | 0–07 – 0–16 | Ballinhassig | Childers Road |
| | J Chawke 0-7. | | D O'Sullivan 0-10, T Coleman 0-2, F O'Leary 0-1, S Dineen 0-1, D Duggan 0-1, P Lombard 0-1. |

| 23 February 2003 Semi-final | Geraldines | 0–06 – 1–18 | Ballinahinch | Fraher Field |
| | M Murray 0-3, D Tobin 0-1, P Donovan 0-1, N Downing 0-1. | | D Kelly 0-7, A Kelly 0-5, C Bourke 1-1, C Brennan 0-3, N Fahy 0-2. | Referee: K Healy (Cork) |

=== Munster final ===
| 15 March 2003 Final | Ballinhassig | 6–07 – 2–08 | Ballinahinch | Páirc Liam Mhic Cárthaigh |
| | D O'Sullivan 0-6, D Duggan 1-0, D Lombard 1-0, T Coleman 1-0, D Dineen 1-0, S Dineen 1-0, M Coleman 1-0, J Mullaney 0-1. | | G Griffin 1-1, S McGrath 1-1, D Kelly 0-4, N Fahy 0-1, A Kelly 0-1, P Kelly 0-1, | Referee: S McMahon (Clare) |

== All-Ireland Junior Club Hurling Championship ==
=== All-Ireland final ===
| 11 May 2003 Final | Ballinhassig | 4–15 – 1–06 | Blacks and Whites | Walsh Park |
| | D Duggan 3–2, J Mullaney 0–6 (5f, 1 '65), D O'Sullivan 0–5 (3f), T Coleman 1–0, M Coleman 0–1 (f), J O'Sullivan 0–1. | Report | M Ryan 1–2 (1–0 pen, 0–1 f), J Byrne 0–2 (fs), N Kennedy and P Cleere 0–1 each. | Referee: P Moore (Waterford) |
