= Castleblayney Hurling Club =

Hurling club from County Monaghan, Ireland

- Cumann Iomána Baile na Lorgan
- Founded: 1906
- County: Monaghan
- Nickname: 'Blayney
- Colours: Green and Gold
- Grounds: Concra, Castleblayney
- Coordinates: 54°06′20″N 6°42′42″W

Playing kits
Standard colours

Senior Club Championships
	All Ireland	Ulster champions	Monaghan champions
Hurling:	0	0	36

Castleblayney Hurling Club is a hurling club based in the town of Castleblayney, County Monaghan, Ireland. They are the most successful hurling club in Monaghan, having won the senior championship 34 times. It is a separate club from Castleblayney Faughs, the town's Gaelic football club.

== History ==
The club was founded in 1906, and won their first senior championship in 1943, beating Carrickmacross in the final. They have gone on to dominate the competition, their most recent success coming in 2025.

Castleblayney reached the final of the Ulster Junior Club Hurling Championship for the first time in 2005. Castleblayney won the championship with a 2–15 to 1–8 win over Strabane. In 2011, Blayney reached the final of the Ulster Intermediate Club Hurling Championship, where they were well beaten by Middletown. They would reach the junior final again in 2014, and won the title for a second time with a comfortable win over Na Magha.

The club played in their third Ulster Junior final in 2018, where they played Cushendun. Behind by five points in the second-half, Castleblayney came back and a last-minute winner gave the club their third Ulster title. Blayney qualified for the final of the All-Ireland Junior Club Hurling Championship for the first time with a one-point semi-final win over Carrick. The final was played on 10 February 2019 in Croke Park against Dunnamaggin from Kilkenny. Castleblayney were three points up in the second-half, but Dunnamaggin scored the last seven points of the game to take the title.

Despite losing the county final to Inniskeen in 2023, Castleblayney represented Monaghan in the Ulster Junior championship. A four-point final win over St Eunan's gave 'Blayney their fourth Ulster title.

== Honours ==
- Ulster Junior Club Hurling Championship: 4
  - 2005, 2014, 2018, 2023
- Monaghan Senior Hurling Championship: 36
  - 1943, 1955, 1957, 1958, 1959, 1962, 1974, 1977, 1979, 1988, 1989, 1992, 1994, 1999, 2000, 2001, 2002, 2004, 2005, 2006, 2007, 2008, 2009, 2011, 2012, 2014, 2015, 2017, 2018, 2019, 2020, 2021, 2022, 2024, 2025, 2026
