= Craobh Rua GAA =

Armagh-based Gaelic games club

Craobh Rua Camlocha
- Craobh Rua Camlocha
- Founded: 1991
- County: Armagh
- Nickname: "The Rua"
- Colours: Red and white
- Grounds: Bessbrook
- Coordinates: 54°11′30.5″N 6°23′32.6″W

Playing kits
Standard colours

Senior Club Championships
	All Ireland	Ulster champions	Armagh champions
Hurling:	0	0	0

Craobh Rua Camlocha (CRC) is a Gaelic Athletic Association (GAA) club located in Bessbrook, County Armagh, Northern Ireland. The club is solely concerned with the game of hurling.

== History ==
Craobh Rua Camlocha hurling club was established after a meeting of its founding members was held in Camlough in 1991. It was set up to help reintroduce hurling in the Camlough and Bessbrook areas of South Armagh. The clubs members now come from all around South Armagh, including from Belleeks, Whitecross, Crossmaglen, Lislea and Mullaghbawn. The club was over 20 years in existence when it won its first Armagh Junior Hurling Championship title in 2013. Craobh Rua have since added to their championship title tally.

In 2021/2022, Craobh Rua won their third-ever Armagh junior title against Cuchulainn II team. This was also the club's first time winning the Armagh title two years in a row. In this year they also won the Ulster Junior Hurling Championship beating the Monaghan club Carrickmacross in the final. This was the first time a team from County Armagh won a junior hurling title in Ulster. The season came to a halt in Birmingham at the home of Warwickshire GAA when they lost in penalties (1–2) after extra time to Fullen Gaels in the quarter-finals of the 2021–22 All-Ireland Championship.

== Honours ==
- Ulster Junior Club Hurling Championship (1): 2021
- Armagh Junior Hurling Championship (3): 2013, 2020, 2021
