= Munster Junior Club Hurling Championship =

Hurling competition

- Current season or competition: 2026 Munster Junior Club Hurling Championship
- Irish: Craobh Iomána Clubanna Sóisearach na Mumhan
- Code: Hurling
- Founded: 2001; 25 years ago
- Region: Munster (GAA)
- Trophy: Rody Nealon Cup
- No. of teams: 6
- Title holders: Kilbrittain (1st title)
- Most titles: Ballygiblin; Russell Rovers (2 titles)
- Sponsors: Allied Irish Bank
- Motto: The toughest of them all
- Official website: Official website

The Munster Junior Club Hurling Championship (known for sponsorship reasons as the AIB Munster GAA Hurling Junior Club Championship) is an annual hurling competition organised by the Munster Council of the Gaelic Athletic Association and contested by the five champion junior clubs and one champion intermediate club in the province of Munster in Ireland. It is the most prestigious competition for junior clubs in Munster hurling.

The Munster Junior Club Championship was introduced in 2001. In its current format, the championship begins in late October or early November and is usually played over a four-week period. The six participating club teams compete in a straight knockout competition that culminates with the Munster final for the two remaining teams. The winner of the Munster Junior Championship, as well as being presented with the Rody Nealon Cup, qualifies for the subsequent All-Ireland Club Championship.

The competition has been won by 21 teams, however, only two teams has ever won the championship on more than one occasion. Cork clubs have accumulated the highest number of victories with 18 wins.

Kilbrittain are the title holders, defeating Kilrossanty by 2–17 to 0–09 in the 2025 final.

== Format ==
=== Overview ===
The Munster Championship is a single elimination tournament. Each team is afforded only one defeat before being eliminated from the championship. Pairings for matches are drawn at random and there is no seeding.

Each match is played as a single leg. If a match is drawn there is a period of extra time, however, if both sides are still level at the end of extra time a replay takes place and so on until a winner is found.

=== Competition format ===
Quarter-final: Four teams contest this round. The two winning teams advances directly to the semi-final stage. The two losing teams are eliminated from the championship.

Semi-finals: Four teams contest this round. The two winning teams advance directly to the final. The two losing teams are eliminated from the championship.

Final: The final is contested by the two semi-final winners.

== Teams ==
=== Qualification ===
County	Championship	Qualifying team
Clare	Clare Junior A Hurling Championship	Champions
Cork	Cork Premier Junior Hurling Championship	Champions
Kerry	Kerry Intermediate Hurling Championship	Champions
Limerick	Limerick Premier Junior A Hurling Championship	Champions
Tipperary	Tipperary Junior A Hurling Championship	Champions
Waterford	Waterford Junior A Hurling Championship	Champions

=== 2025 teams ===
The following clubs are due to compete in the 2025 Munster Junior Club Hurling Championship. It is due to include some teams from Clare, twelve teams from Cork, nine teams from Kerry, twelve teams from Limerick, twenty six teams from Tipperary and fourteen teams from Waterford.

County	No.	Clubs competing in county championship
Clare		
Cork	12	Argideen Rangers, Ballygarvan, Barryroe, Cloughduv, Glen Rovers, **Kilbrittain**, Meelin, Milford, Nemo Rangers, St Catherine's, St Finbarr's, Tracton
Kerry	9	Abbeydorney, Ballyheigue, Dr Crokes, **Kenmare Shamrocks**, Kilgarvan, Kilmoyley, Ladys Walk, Lixnaw, St Brendan's
Limerick	12	Askeaton–Kilcornan Desmonds, Caherline, Crecora/Manister, Doon, Dromcollogher/Broadford, Kilmallock, Kilteely-Dromkeen, Knockaderry, Monagea, Monaleen, St Patrick's, Tournafulla
Tipperary	26	Ballinahinch, Ballylooby–Castlegrace, Boherlahan–Dualla, Borris–Ileigh, Cahir, Carrick Swans, Cashel King Cormacs, Clonmel Óg, Drom & Inch, Galtee Rovers, Grangemockler, Holycross–Ballycahill, JK Brackens, Kildangan, Kilruane MacDonagh's, Lattin–Cullen, Loughmore–Castleiney, Moycarkey–Borris, **Moyle Rovers**, Mullinahone, Nenagh Éire Óg, Rockwell Rovers, Roscrea, St Patrick’s, Thurles Sarsfields, Toomevara
Waterford	14	Abbeyside–Ballinacourty, Ballydurn, Ballygunner, Cappoquin, Clonea, De La Salle, Fenor, Fourmilewater, **Kilrossanty**, Mount Sion, Passage, Roanmore, St Marys East, Stradbally

Note: Bold indicates county representatives.

== Trophy and medals ==
At the end of the Munster final, the winning team is presented with a trophy. The Rody Nealon Cup is held by the winning team until the following year's final. Traditionally, the presentation is made at a special rostrum in the stand where GAA and other dignitaries and special guests view the match.

The cup is decorated with ribbons in the colours of the winning team. During the game the cup actually has both teams' sets of ribbons attached and the runners-up ribbons are removed before the presentation. The winning captain accepts the cup on behalf of his team before giving a short speech. Individual members of the winning team then have an opportunity to come to the rostrum to lift the cup.

The cup is named after Rody Nealon. He was an All-Ireland medal winner with Tipperary in 1925 before later serving as chairman and secretary of the Burgess club at different times, while he was also a member of the Tipperary County Board and the Munster Council.

In accordance with GAA rules, the Munster Council awards a set of 24 gold medals to the winners of the Munster final.

== Sponsorship ==
Since 2001, the Munster Championship has been sponsored. The sponsor has usually been able to determine the championship's sponsorship name.

Period	Sponsor	Name
2001–present	(Republic of Ireland) Allied Irish Bank	The AIB Munster Junior Club Hurling Championship

== List of Finals ==
=== List of Munster JHC finals ===
Year	Winners			Runners-up			Venue
Year	County	Club	Score	County	Club	Score	Venue
2025	COR	Kilbrittain	2-17	WAT	Kilrossanty	0-09	Mallow GAA Complex
2024	COR	Russell Rovers	3–12	WAT	Kilrossanty	1–07	Páirc Uí Rinn
2023	COR	St Catherine's	2-14	LIM	Feenagh–Kilmeedy	1-15	Mallow GAA Complex
2022	COR	Ballygiblin	3-12	LIM	St Kierans	0-11	Mallow GAA Complex
2021	COR	Ballygiblin	2-14	TIP	Skeheenarinky	1-09	Mallow GAA Complex
2020	No Championship						
2019	COR	Russell Rovers	2-13	WAT	St. Mary's	0-11	Fraher Field
2018	COR	Cloughduv	0-17	WAT	Ballinameela	0-12	Mallow GAA Complex
2017	WAT	Ardmore	3-11	TIP	Ballybacon-Grange	2-08	Mallow GAA Complex
2016	COR	Mayfield	2-18	WAT	Ballyduff Lower	3-10	Mallow GAA Complex
2015	COR	Dungourney	1-17	WAT	Fenor	0-08	Mallow GAA Complex
2014	WAT	Modeligo	5-12	COR	Castlemartyr	0-14	Mallow GAA Complex
2013	WAT	Ballysaggart	3-12	LIM	Feenagh-Kilmeedy	0-15	Mallow GAA Complex
2012	COR	Kildorrery	1-11	LIM	| St Kierans	0-12	Mallow GAA Complex
2011	COR	Charleville	3-15	LIM	Cappamore	2-08	Mallow GAA Complex
2010	COR	Meelin	5-18	TIP	St. Patrick's	0-09	Mallow GAA Complex
2009	LIM	Blackrock	1-12	COR	Fermoy	0-14	Mallow GAA Complex
2008	COR	Dripsey	2-11	KER	Kilgarvan	1-03	Mallow GAA Complex
2007	TIP	Moyle Rovers	3-10	COR	Barryroe	0-09	Páirc Mac Gearailt
2006	COR	Kilworth	4-16	TIP	Knockshegowna	1-07	Meelick
2005	COR	Fr. O'Neill's	1-12	TIP	Knockshegowna	0-07	Gaelic Grounds
2004	COR	Ballygarvan	0-16	WAT	Tramore	1-05	Páirc Mac Gearailt
2003	CLA	Newmarket-on-Fergus	3-10	COR	Dromina	1-10	
2002	COR	Ballinhassig	6-07	TIP	Ballinahinch	2-08	
2001	COR	Courcey Rovers		WAT	Ardmore		

== Roll of Honour ==
=== By club ===
#	Club	County	Titles	Runners-up	Championships won	Championships runner-up
1	Ballygiblin	COR	2	0	2021, 2022	—
1	Russell Rovers	COR	2	0	2019, 2024	—
3	Ardmore	WAT	1	1	2017	2001
3	Courcey Rovers	COR	1	0	2001	—
3	Ballinhassig	COR	1	0	2002	—
3	Newmarket-on-Fergus	CLA	1	0	2003	—
3	Ballygarvan	COR	1	0	2004	—
3	Fr. O'Neill's	COR	1	0	2005	—
3	Kilworth	COR	1	0	2006	—
3	Moyle Rovers	TIP	1	0	2007	—
3	Dripsey	COR	1	0	2008	—
3	Blackrock	LIM	1	0	2009	—
3	Meelin	COR	1	0	2010	—
3	Charleville	COR	1	0	2011	—
3	Kildorrery	COR	1	0	2012	—
3	Ballysaggart	WAT	1	0	2013	—
3	Modeligo	WAT	1	0	2014	—
3	Dungourney	COR	1	0	2015	—
3	Mayfield	COR	1	0	2016	—
3	Cloughduv	COR	1	0	2018	—
3	St Catherine's	COR	1	0	2023	—
3	Kilbrittain	COR	1	0	2025	—
23	Knockshegowna	TIP	0	2	—	2005, 2006
23	St Kierans	LIM	0	2	—	2012, 2022
23	Feenagh–Kilmeedy	LIM	0	2	—	2013, 2023
23	Kilrossanty	WAT	0	2	—	2024, 2025
23	Ballinahinch	TIP	0	1	—	2002
23	Dromina	COR	0	1	—	2003
23	Tramore	WAT	0	1	—	2004
23	Barryroe	COR	0	1	—	2007
23	Kilgarvan	KER	0	1	—	2008
23	Fermoy	COR	0	1	—	2009
23	St. Patrick's	TIP	0	1	—	2010
23	Cappamore	LIM	0	1	—	2011
23	Castlemartyr	COR	0	1	—	2014
23	Fenor	WAT	0	1	—	2015
23	Ballyduff Lower	WAT	0	1	—	2016
23	Ballybacon-Grange	TIP	0	1	—	2017
23	Ballinameela	WAT	0	1	—	2018
23	St. Mary's	WAT	0	1	—	2019
23	Skeheenarinky	TIP	0	1	—	2021

=== By county ===
County	Titles	Runners-up	Total
Cork	18	4	21
Waterford	3	8	10
Tipperary	1	6	7
Limerick	1	5	6
Clare	1	0	1
Kerry	0	1	1

== Records and statistics ==
=== County representatives ===
Year	Clare	Cork	Kerry	Limerick	Tipperary	Waterford
2002	Éire Óg	Ballinhassig	N/A	Kildimo-Pallaskenry	Ballinahinch	Geraldines
2003	Newmarket-on-Feregus	Dromina	Laune Rangers	Feenagh–Kilmeedy	Thurles Fennellys	Kilgobnet
2004	Ennistymon	Ballygarvan	Kenmare Shamrocks	Knockaderry	Ballyneale	Tramore
2005	Meelick	Fr O'Neill's	Kenmare Shamrocks	Hospital-Herbertstown	Knockshegowna	Brickey Rangers
2006	Meelick	Kilworth	Kilgarvan	Mungret/St. Paul's	Knockshegowna	Fenor
2007	Meelick	Barryroe	Kilgarvan	Caherline	Moyle Rovers	Ballysaggart
2008	N/A	Dripsey	Kilgarvan	Monages	Emly	Modeligo
2009	N/A	Fermoy	Kilgarvan	Blackrock	Aherlow	Tourin
2010	N/A	Meelin	Kilgarvan	Effin	St Patrick's	Ballydurn
2011	N/A	Charleville	Kenmare Shamrocks	Cappamore	Rockwell Rovers	Ballinameela
2012	N/A	Kildorrery	Kenmare Shamrocks	St Kieran's	Kilsheelan–Kilcash	Butlerstown
2013	Bodyke	Grenagh	Kenmare Shamrocks	Feenagh–Kilmeedy	Knockshegowna	Ballysaggart
2014	N/A	Castlemartry	Kenmare Shamrocks	Feohanagh-Castlemahon	Skeheenarinky	Modeligo
2015	Ennistymon	Dungourney	Dr Crokes	Dromcollogher-Broadford	Ballylooby-Castlegrace	Fenor
2016	Bodyke	Mayfield	Kilgarvan	St Patrick's	Ballybacon-Grange	Ballyduff Lower
2017	Bodyke	St Catherine's	Kenmare Shamrocks	St Patrick's	Ballybacon-Grange	Ardmore
2018	N/A	Cloughduv	Kilgarvan	Tournafulla	Boherlahan-Dualla	Ballinameela
2019	N/A	Russell Rovers	Kilgarvan	Castletown-Ballyagran	Carrick Davins	St Mary's
2021	Ogonnelloe	Ballygiblin	Tralee Parnells	Caherline	Skeheenarinky	Brickey Rangers
2022	Banner	Ballygiblin	Kilgarvan	St Kieran's	Ballyneale	Colligan
2023	Banner	St Catherine's	Tralee Parnells	Feenagh–Kilmeedy	Ballinahinch	Ardmore
2024	Banner	Russell Rovers	Kilgarvan	Feenagh–Kilmeedy	Moyle Rovers	Kilrossanty
2025	Banner	Kilbrittain	Kenmare Shamrocks	Knockaderry	Cahir	Kilrossanty
2026	Ennistymon	Kilshannig	Dr Crokes	Caherline	Fethard	Ardmore

=== Biggest wins ===
The most one sided Munster finals:

- 24 points – 2010: Meelin 5-18 (33) – (9) 0-09 St. Patrick's
- 18 points – 2006: Kilworth 4-16 (28) – (10) 1-07 Knockshegowna
- 13 points – 2014: Modeligo 5-12 (27) – (14) 0-14 Castlemartyr
- 12 points – 2017: Dungourney 1-17 (20) – (8) 0-08 Fenor
- 11 points – 2008: Dripsey 2-11 (17) – (6) 1-03 Kilgarvan

=== Top scorers ===
==== All time ====
As of match played 29 November 2025

Rank	Top scorer	Team	Score	Total
1	Pádraig Fitzgerald	Kilrossanty	4-50	62
1	Shane Meehan	Banner	3-53	62
3	Mickey Foley	Kilgarvan	3-38	47
4	Josh Beausang	Russell Rovers	2-31	37
4	Diarmuid Coleman	Feenagh–Kilmeedy	0-37	37
6	Séamus Prendergast	Ardmore	5-20	35
7	Joseph O'Sullivan	Ballygiblin	0-34	34
8	Stephen Bennett	Ballysaggart	3-23	32
9	James O'Brien	Charleville	3-19	28
10	Nicky Kelly	Mayfield	0-27	27

==== By year ====
Year	Top scorer	Team	Score	Total
2002	John Chawke	Kildimo-Pallaskenry	0-19	19
2003	Pat Lawlor	Thurles Fennellys	3-09	18
2004	Liam Dillon	Ballygarvan	0-17	17
2005	Michael Kennedy	Knockshegowna	1-09	12
2006	Paudie Lynch	Kilworth	1-12	15
2007	Kieran Griffin	Barryroe	0-20	20
2008	Diarmuid O'Riordan	Dripsey	3-13	22
2009	Cathal Dillon	Aherlow	0-15	15
2010	Éamonn Brosnan	Meelin	3-17	26
2011	James O'Brien	Charleville	3-19	28
2012	Peter O'Brien	Kildorrery	3-15	24
2013	Stephen Bennett	Ballysaggart	3-23	32
2014	Jamie Troy	Modeligo	1-14	17
2015	Liam Tierney	Ennistymon	2-12	18
2016	Nicky Kelly	Mayfield	0-27	27
2017	Séamus Prendergast	Ardmore	5-20	35
2018	Anthony Hartnett	Tournafulla	0-24	24
2019	Eoin Kearns	St. Mary's	1-21	24
2020	No championship			
2021	Tomás Vaughan	Skeheenarinky	0-25	25
2022	Shane Meehan	Banner	2-23	30
2023	Diarmuid Coleman	Feenagh–Kilmeedy	0-23	23
2024	Pádraig Fitzgerald	Kilrossanty	2-26	32
2025	Pádraig Fitzgerald	Kilrossanty	2-24	30

==== Single game ====
Year	Top scorer	Team	Opposition	Score	Total
2002	John Chawke	Kildimo-Pallaskenry	Éire Óg, Inis	0-12	12
2003	Pat Lawlor	Thurles Fennellys	Laune Rangers	3-09	18
2004	Tommy Hogan	Ennistymon	Ballyneale	2-02	8
2005	Ronan Conlon	Meelick	Hospital-Herbertstown	0-07	7
2006	Paudie Lynch	Kilworth	Knockshegowna	1-08	11
2007	Mickey Foley	Kilgarvan	Caherline	1-09	12
2008	Pat Buckley	Emly	Kilgarvan	3-06	15
2009	Cathal Dillon	Aherlow	Tourin	0-10	10
2009	Darragh Fives	Tourin	Aherlow	0-10	10
2010	Éamonn Brosnan	Meelin	Effin	2-10	16
2011	James O'Brien	Charleville	Rockwell Rovers	1-08	11
2012	Peter O'Brien	Kildorrery	Butlerstown	2-09	15
2013	Stephen Bennett	Ballysaggart	Grenagh	1-11	14
2014	Barry Lawton	Castlemartyr	Modeligo	0-10	10
2015	Liam Tierney	Ennistymon	Ballylooby-Castlegrace	2-07	13
2016	Shane Duggan	Mayfield	St. Patrick's	2-06	12
2017	Séamus Prendergast	Ardmore	Bodyke	2-06	12
2017	Séamus Prendergast	Ardmore	St. Patrick's	1-09	12
2018	Anthony Hartnett	Tournafulla	Kilgarvan	0-14	14
2019	Josh Beausang	Russell Rovers	St. Mary's	1-08	11
2019	Josh Beausang	Russell Rovers	Kilgarvan	0-11	11
2020	No championship				
2021	Tomás Vaughan	Skeheenarinky	Ogonnelloe	0-11	11
2022	Shane Meehan	Banner	Kilgarvan	2-11	17

==== Finals ====
Final	Top scorer	Team	Score	Total
2002	Declan O'Sullivan	Ballinhassig	0-06	6
2003	Robert Shanahan	Newmarket	3-01	10
2004	Liam Dillon	Ballygarvan	0-07	7
2005	Ger O'Leary	Fr. O'Neill's	0-06	6
2006	Paudie Lynch	Kilworth	1-08	11
2007	Barry Whelan	Moyle Rovers	2-01	7
2008	Mark O'Sullivan	Dripsey	2-00	6
2009	Brian O'Sullivan	Fermoy	0-09	9
2010	Éamonn Brosnan	Meelin	1-07	10
2011	James O'Brien	Charleville	1-05	8
2012	Peter O'Brien	Kildorrery	1-06	9
2013	Stephen Bennett	Ballysaggart	1-07	10
2014	Barry Lawton	Castlemartyr	0-10	10
2015	Ryan Denny	Dungourney	0-11	11
2016	Nicky Kelly	Mayfield	0-10	10
2017	Séamus Prendergast	Ardmore	2-05	11
2018	Brian Verling	Cloughduv	0-09	9
2019	Josh Beausang	Russell Rovers	1-08	11
2020	No championship			
2021	Joseph O'Sullivan	Ballygiblin	0-09	9
2022	Shane Beston	Ballygiblin	3-03	12

== See also ==
- Munster Senior Club Hurling Championship (Tier 1)
- Munster Intermediate Club Hurling Championship (Tier 2)
