= 2024 Waterford Premier Intermediate Football Championship =

Annual Gaelic football competition season

- Dates: 7 September – 13 October 2024
- Teams: 7
- Sponsor: Cappoquin Logistics
- Champions: Stradbally (1st title); Liam Fennell (captain)
- Runners-up: Modeligo
- Relegated: Ballinameela

Tournament statistics
- Matches played: 14
- Goals scored: 30 (2.14 per match)
- Points scored: 307 (21.93 per match)

The 2024 Waterford Premier Intermediate Football Championship was the second staging of the Waterford Premier Intermediate Football Championship since its establishment by the Waterford County Board. The draws for the group stage pairings was made on 29 January 2024. The championship ran from 7 September to 13 October 2024.

The final was played on 13 October 2024 at Páirc Naomh Bríd in Lemybrien, between Stradbally and Modeligo, in what was their first ever meeting in the final. Stradbally won the match by 1–18 to 3–06 to claim their first ever championship title.

== Team changes ==
=== To Championship ===
Relegated from the Waterford Senior Football Championship

- Portlaw
- Stradbally

Promoted from the Waterford Intermediate Football Championship

- De La Salle

=== From Championship ===
Promoted to the Waterford Senior Football Championship

- Roanmore

Relegated to the Waterford Intermediate Football Championship

- Kilmacthomas

== Group A ==
=== Group A table ===
Semi-finalists Relegation playoff

| Team | Matches | | | | Score | | | Pts |
| Team | Pld | W | D | L | For | Against | Diff | Pts |
|---|---|---|---|---|---|---|---|---|
| St Saviour's | 2 | 2 | 0 | 0 | 25 | 16 | 9 | 4 |
| De La Salle | 2 | 1 | 0 | 1 | 20 | 18 | 2 | 2 |
| Ballinameela | 2 | 0 | 0 | 2 | 19 | 30 | -11 | 0 |

=== Group A results ===
| 8 September 2024 Round 1 | Ballinameela | 0-08 - 1-12 | De La Salle | Kilmacthomas Grounds |

| 14 September 2024 Round 2 | De La Salle | 0-05 - 1-07 | St Saviour's | Walsh Park |

| 22 September 2024 Round 3 | Ballinameela | 1-08 - 1-12 | St Saviour's | Kilmacthomas Grounds |

== Group B ==
=== Group B table ===
Semi-finalists Relegation playoff

| Team | Matches | | | | Score | | | Pts |
| Team | Pld | W | D | L | For | Against | Diff | Pts |
|---|---|---|---|---|---|---|---|---|
| Stradbally | 3 | 3 | 0 | 0 | 61 | 31 | 30 | 6 |
| Modeligo | 3 | 2 | 0 | 1 | 38 | 49 | -11 | 4 |
| Portlaw | 3 | 1 | 0 | 2 | 42 | 45 | -3 | 2 |
| Rathgormack | 3 | 0 | 0 | 3 | 33 | 49 | -16 | 0 |

=== Group B results ===
| 7 September 2024 Round 1 | Portlaw | 0-12 - 1-10 | Modeligo | Bushy Park |

| 7 September 2024 Round 1 | Rathgormack | 0-09 - 1-13 | Stradbally | Páirc Naomh Bríd |

| 12 September 2024 Round 2 | Rathgormack | 1-08 - 1-12 | Portlaw | Fraher Field |

| 14 September 2024 Round 2 | Modeligo | 0-07 - 3-15 | Stradbally | Páirc Naomh Bríd |

| 21 September 2024 Round 3 | Portlaw | 1-12 - 2-15 | Stradbally | Páirc Naomh Bríd |

| 21 September 2024 Round 3 | Rathgormack | 1-10 - 2-12 | Modeligo | Páirc Naomh Bríd |

== Knockout stage ==
=== Relegation playoffs ===
| 7 October 2024 Round 1 | Portlaw | 2-13 - 2-07 | Rathgormack | St Molleran's Park |

| 12 October 2024 Round 2 | Ballinameela | 0-08 - 1-10 | Rathgormack | Stradbally Grounds |

=== Semi-finals ===
| 6 October 2024 Semi-final | St Saviour's | 2-15 - 2-16 | Modeligo | Kilmacthomas Grounds |

| 7 October 2024 Semi-final | Stradbally | 0-14 - 0-13 | De La Salle | Páirc Naomh Bríd |

=== Final ===
| 13 October 2024 Final | Modeligo | 3-06 - 1-18 | Stradbally | Páirc Naomh Bríd |
| | D Weldon 0-5, R Fennell 1-1, M O’Brien 0-4 (FS), M Mullaney 0-2, K Lawlor, J Mullaney, E O’Brien, P Skehan, L Fennell and S Ahearn 0-1 each. | Report | J Walsh 0-4 (Fs), J Devine 1-1, P O’Donovan and J Hickey 1-0 each, P Walsh 0-1 (f). |
