= 2021–22 All-Ireland Junior Club Hurling Championship =

Championship Details
- Dates: 14 November 2021 – February 2022
- Teams: 29

All Ireland Champions
- Winners: Mooncoin (1st win)
- Captain: Niall Madden
- Manager: Willie Coogan

All Ireland Runners-up
- Runners-up: Ballygiblin
- Captain: Fionn Herlihy
- Manager: Dave Moher

Provincial Champions
- Munster: Ballygiblin
- Leinster: Mooncoin
- Ulster: Craobh Rua
- Connacht: Salthill-Knocknacarra

Championship Statistics
- Matches Played: 28
- Total Goals: 80 (2.85 per game)
- Total Points: 816 (29.14 per game)
- Top Scorer: Patrick Walsh (5-35)

The 2021–22 All-Ireland Junior Club Hurling Championship was the 18th staging of the All-Ireland Junior Club Hurling Championship, the Gaelic Athletic Association's junior inter-county club hurling tournament. It will be the first club championship to be completed in two years as the 2020–21 series was cancelled due to the COVID-19 pandemic. The championship began on 14 November 2021 and ended on 5 February 2022.

The All-Ireland final was played on 5 February 2022 at Croke Park in Dublin, between Mooncoin from Kilkenny and Ballygiblin from Cork, in what was their first ever meeting in a final. Mooncoin won the match by 0–22 to 1–18 to claim their first ever championship title.

Mooncoin's Patrick Walsh was the championship's top scorer with 5-35.

== Team summaries ==
Club	County Championship	#
Arklow Rock Parnells	Wicklow Intermediate Hurling Championship	
Ballela	Down Junior Hurling Championship	
Ballygiblin	Cork Junior A Hurling Championship	
Boardsmill	Meath Intermediate Hurling Championship	
Brickey Rangers	Waterford Junior Hurling Championship	
Caherline	Limerick Junior Hurling Championship	
Carrickmacross Emmets	Monaghan Senior Hurling Championship	
Clanna Gael Fontenoy	Dublin Junior Hurling Championship (runners-up)	
Con Magees	Antrim Junior Hurling Championship	
Craobh Rua	Armagh Junior Hurling Championship	
Clauinín Iomáint	Leitrim Senior Hurling Championship	
Cootehill Celtic	Cavan Senior Hurling Championship	
Easkey	Sligo Senior Hurling Championship	
Longford Slashers	Longford Senior Hurling Championship	
Maynooth	Kildare Intermediate Hurling Championship	
Mooncoin	Kilkenny Premier Junior Hurling Championship	
Na Magha	Derry Junior Hurling Championship	
Naomh Colum Cille	Tyrone Junior Hurling Championship	
Ogonnelloe	Clare Junior Hurling Championship	
Salthill-Knocknacarra	Galway Junior Hurling Championship	
Shamrocks	Offaly Intermediate Hurling Championship (runners-up)	
Skeheenarinky	Tipperary Junior A Hurling Championship	
St Eunan's	Donegal Senior Hurling Championship	
St Fechin's	Louth Senior Hurling Championship	
St Oliver Plunketts	Westmeath Intermediate Hurling Championship	
Tara Rocks	Wexford Intermediate A Hurling Championship	
Tralee Parnells	Kerry Intermediate Hurling Championship	
Trumera	Laois Intermediate Hurling Championship	

== Connacht Junior Club Hurling Championship ==
=== Connacht Junior Club Hurling Championship ===
==== Semi-final ====
20 November 2021 Semi-final	Cluainín Iomáint (Leitrim)	1-15 - 2-15	Easkey (Sligo)	Seán O'Heslin Memorial Park
	G O'Hagan 0-12, M Feeney 1-0, E Clancy 0-1, J Rooney 0-1, P Doolan 0-1.		T Cawley 1-2, A Kilcullen 0-5, J McHugh 0-4, D Hanley 1-0, F Cawley 0-2, F Connolly 0-1, M Gordon 0-1.	Referee: J Judge

==== Final ====
11 December 2021 Final	Easkey (Sligo)	1-12 - 1-16	Salthill-Knocknacarra (Galway)	Connacht GAA COE
	A Kilcullen 0-8, J McHugh 1-0, R McHugh 0-2, T Cawley 0-2.		D O'Shea 0-12, M O'Donnell 1-1, S Kelly 0-2, D O'Flaherty 0-1.

== Leinster Junior Club Hurling Championship ==
=== Leinster Junior Club Hurling Championship ===
==== First round ====
14 November 2021 First round	Longford Slashers (Longford)	0-11 - 1-16	Trumera (Laois)	Glennon Brothers Pearse Park
	C Kavanagh 0-6 (0-5 frees), R Murray 0-4 (0-2 frees), R Kenny 0-1.	Report	P Hosey 1-3, N Sinnott 0-6, A Kirwan 0-4, C Brophy 0-3, C Madden 0-1	Referee: M Ryan (Dublin)

20 November 2021 First round	Tara Rocks (Wexford)	10-35 - 0-04	Arklow Rock Parnells (Wicklow)	St. Patrick's Park
	P Fortune (4-6), C Devitt (2-2); B O’Connor (2-2), J Curtis (0-8, 1 free, 1 ’65), D O’Toole (0-7, 1 ’65, 1 free), C Kinsella (1-2), J Bolger (1-0), M Boland (0-3), B Morris (0-2); P Hughes (0-2), N Breen (0-1).	Report	P Mellon (0-3), T Somers (0-1).	Referee: O Behan (Kilkenny)

20 November 2021 First round	St. Fechin's	1-16 - 2-15	St Oliver Plunkett's	Dowdallshill GAA Grounds
	P Lynch 0-9, S Conneely 1-2, S Kerrisk 0-2, M Byrne 0-1, D Ryan 0-1, S Hodgins 0-1.		C Curley 1-2, M Cunningham 1-2, C Bracken 0-5, D Gavin 0-2, D Kiernan 0-2, S Kelly 0-1, R Coroon 0-1.

==== Quarter-finals ====
27 November 2021 Quarter-final	St Oliver Plunkett's	1-14 - 3-23	Mooncoin	Johnstown Park
	D Gavin (0-5, 0-4 frees), C Bracken (0-5, frees); P Lynam (0-4, 0-2 frees); C Curley (1-0).	Report	P Walsh (1-8, 0-6 frees); J Fitzgerald (0-5); K Hogan, M Gannon (1-1 each); A Croke (0-3); S Gannon, M O’Neill (0-2 each); L Treacy (0-1 free).

4 December 2021 Quarter-final	Clanna Gael Fontenoy	0-04 - 0-30	Tara Rocks	O'Toole Park
	LR Spillane (0-2); K Morgan (0-1 ‘65); C Morgan (0-1).	Report	D O’Toole (0-9, 4 frees), J Curtis (0-6, 4 frees, 1 ‘65), P Hughes (0-3), C Devitt (0-3); B O’Connor (0-2), M Boland (0-2), N Breen (0-2, 1 free), N Hughes (0-1); P Fortune (0-1), L Owley (0-1).

4 December 2021 Quarter-final	Boardsmill	0-03 - 2-18	Shamrocks	Meath GAA Centre of Excellence
	L O’Brien (F), D Dixon, F Flattery all 0-1 each.	report	N Dunne 0-9 (0-6F, 0-2 ‘65’), S O’Toole-Greene 0-3, D O’Toole-Greene and S Malone 1-0 each, S Heffernan and D Molloy 0-2 each, C Moran, D Minnock 0-1 each.

4 December 2021 Quarter-final	Maynooth	1-18 - 1-10	Trumera	Conneff Park, CLane
	D Qualter 0-11 (0-9F, 0-1 '65'), G Kenny 1-0, T Forde 0-2, C McCabe 0-2, H Dunne 0-1, K Dunne 0-1, R Dunne 0-1	Report	A Kirwan 0-8 (0-8f), J Coogan 1-0, P Hosey 0-1, D Lalor 0-1	Referee: Ciaran Goff - Wicklow

==== Semi-finals ====
11 December 2021 Semi-final	Maynooth	2-08 - 2-09	Shamrocks	Kildare GAA Centre of Excellence
	D Qualter 1-4, C McCabe 1-2, C Flanagan 0-2.		N Dunne 0-5, D Molloy 1-1, D O'Toole-Greene 1-0, S O'Toole-Greene 0-2, D Minnock 0-1.	Referee: D Ryan

11 December 2021 Semi-final	Tara Rocks	2-19 - 5-16 (aet)	Mooncoin	St Patricks Park
	J Curtis 0-10, C Devitt 1-1, B Morris 1-0, M Boland 0-3, D O'Toole 0-1, N Hughes 0-1, P Hughes 0-1, P Fortune 0-1, L Owley 0-1.		A Croke 2-3, P Walsh 1-6, M O'Neill 1-2, M Gannon 1-1, C Quilty 0-2, C Brophy 0-1, K Hogan 0-1.	Referee: P Dunne

==== Final ====
8 January 2022 Final	Mooncoin	4-13 - 0-15	Shamrocks	UPMC Nowlan Park
	P Walsh (3-6, 0-2f), M Gannon (1-0), C Quilty (0-2), M O’Neill (0-2, 0-1f, 0-1 65), J Delahunty, L Treacy and A Croke (0-1 each)	Report	N Dunne (0-10, 0-10f), S O’Toole-Greene (0-2), S Malone, C Moran and D Molloy (0-1 each)	Referee: C Flynn (Westmeath)

== Munster Junior Club Hurling Championship ==
=== Munster Junior Club Hurling Championship ===
==== Quarter-finals ====
27 November 2021 Quarter-final	Tralee Parnells (Kerry)	0-08 - 1-22	Skeheenarinky (Tipperary)	Austin Stack Park
	G O’Doherty (0-5, 3f), D Reen (0-3).	Report	T Vaughan (0-8, 5f, 1’65), C Sweeney (0-5,2f), A English (1-1), N Vaughan (0-3), D Finn, J O’Callaghan, D Brennan, H English, F O Suilleabháin (0-1)	Referee: C O'Regan (Cork)

28 November 2021 Quarter-final	Ogonnelloe (Clare)	3-13 - 2-13	Brickey Rangers (Waterford)	O'Garney Park
	G Sheedy (1-4, 3f), R Skelly (1-2), H Vaughan (1-0), D Cunnane, A Fitzgerald-Bradley (0-2 each), C Fitzgerald-Bradley, C Hart, P English (0-1 each).	Report	T O’Connell (0-7, 6f), M Hanlon (2-0), C O’Grady, E Barry (0-2 each), J Whelan-Veale, C Whelan (0-1 each).	Referee: C Doyle (Tipperary)

==== Semi-finals ====
11 December 2021 Semi-final	Skeheenarinky (Tipperary)	2-16 - 1-16	Ogonnelloe (Clare)	Mallow GAA Complex
	T Vaughan (0-11, 8f), A English (1-1), J O’Callaghan (1-0), D Brennan (0-1), M Maher (0-1), C Sweeney (0-1), D Finn (0-1)	Report	G Sheedy (0-8f), R Skelly (1-0), C Quinn (0-3f), P English (0-2), B Kiely (0-1), C Hart (0-1), A Fitzgerald-Bradley (0-1).	Referee: E Stapleton (Limerick)

12 December 2021 Semi-final	Ballygiblin (Cork)	1-09 - 0-10	Caherline (Limerick)	Kildorrery GAA Grounds
	D Flynn 0-6 (0-5 f, 0-1 65); D Sheehan 1-0; M Walsh, D Barry, C English 0-1 each.	Report	A Brennan 0-4 f; James Enright, A Power 0-2 each; Jack Carroll (f), P Wixted 0-1 each.	Referee: N O'Toole (Waterford)

==== Final ====
9 January 2022 Final	Ballygiblin (Cork)	2-14 - 1-09	Skeheenarinky (Tipperary)	Mallow GAA Complex
	S O'Sullivan 2-2, J O'Sullivan 0-9 (7f, 0-1 65), D Barry, M Walsh, K Duggan 0-1 each.	Report	A English 1-0, T Vaughan 0-6 (6f), C Sweeney, D Brennan, N Vaughan 0-1 each.	Referee: J O'Halloran (Limerick)

== Ulster Junior Club Hurling Championship ==
=== Ulster Junior Club Hurling Championship ===
==== Quarter-finals ====
27 November 2021 Quarter-final	Con Magees (Antrim)	2-16 - 1-08	Naomh Colum Cille (Tyrone)	Fr Healy Park
	C O’Loan 1-5, (4f & 1 pen), N Donnelly 0-7 (6f), C Hynds 1-1, J Duffin 0-2, S McKay 0-1.	Report	P Greville 0-4 frees, N O’Neill 1-0, C Kearns 0-2, O O’Neill 0-1.

27 November 2021 Quarter-final	Craobh Rua (Armagh)	3-10 - 2-08	St Eunan's (Donegal)	Athletic Grounds
	J Og Burns (2-0), R Lewis (1-2), T O’Hare (0-5 3f), F Bradley (0-1), O O’Hare (0-1), C McKevitt (0-1).	Report	C O’Grady (2-2, 1f), D Ó Maoileidigh (0-4f), K Kealy (0-1), C Finn (0-1).

27 November 2021 Quarter-final	Cootehill Celtic (Cavan)	0-10 - 1-14	Na Magha (Derry)	Kingspan Breffni Park
	Mark Moffett (0-2), Fiachra Hughes (0-2), Niall Clerkin (0-2 - 65), Niall Fitzpatrick (0-2f), Diarmuid Carney (0-1f), Gavin Fitzpatrick (0-1).	Report	D Foley (0-6, 0-1f), R McLaughlin (1-1), A Cutliffe (0-3), M Lynch (0-1), M McCloskey (0-1), T Rankin (0-1f), K Doherty (0-1).

28 November 2021 Quarter-final	Carrickmacross Emmets (Monaghan)	2-23 - 3-16	Ballela (Down)	St Tiernach's Park
	L McKenna 0-18, N Bermingham 1-0, M Maguire 1-0, R Nelson 0-1, J Guinan 0-1, S Watters 0-1, J Slevin 0-1, O Kiernan 0-1.	Report	M Magee 2-9, J McCusker 1-2, R McCusker 0-2, O McGreevy 0-1, N Burns 0-1, P Mackin 0-1.

==== Semi-finals ====
11 December 2021 Semi-final	Craobh Rua (Armagh)	0-14 - 0-11	Con Magees (Antrim)	Davitt Park
	T O’Hare (0-10 frees), R Lewis (0-1), F Burns (0-1); F Bradley (0-1), C McKevitt (0-1).	Report	C O’Loan (0-5, 0-4 frees), D Traynor (0-4), R Lennon (0-1), S McKay 0-1.

11 December 2021 Semi-final	Carrickmacross Emmets (Monaghan)	2-13 - 0-18	Na Magha (Derry)	Eire Óg Carrickmore GAA Grounds
	L McKenna 1-8, S Slevin 1-0, O Kiernan 0-3, S Watters 0-1, J Slevin 0-1.	Report	D Foley 0-14, T Gallagher 0-1, T Rankin 0-1, A Cutliffe 0-1, R McLaughlin 0-1.

==== Final ====
18 December 2021 Final	Carrickmacross Emmets (Monaghan)	1-10 - 1-15	Craobh Rua (Armagh)	Páirc Esler
	L McKenna (0-5, 0-4 frees), J Slevin (0-5, 0-4 frees), O Kieran (1-0).		T O’Hare (0-9, 0-8 frees), C McKevitt (1-2), F Bradley (0-2), O O’Hare (0-1), R Lewis (0-1).

== All-Ireland Junior Club Hurling Championship ==
=== All-Ireland Junior Club Hurling Championship ===
Quarter-finals
Craobh Rua (Armagh)	2-17
Fullen Gaels (Lancashire)	2-17p

Semi-finals
Fullen Gaels (Lancashire)	0-12
Ballygiblin (Cork)	4-20
Salthill-Knocknacarra (Galway)	0-11
Mooncoin (Kilkenny)	2-26

Final
Ballygiblin (Cork)
Mooncoin (Kilkenny)

==== Quarter-final ====
9 January 2022 Quarter-final	Fullen Gaels (Lancashire)	2-17 - 2-17 (aet); Penalties: 1-2	Craobh Rua (Armagh)	Páirc na hÉireann
		Report	T O'Hare 0-12, F Burns 1-0, R Lewis 1-0, F Bradley 0-1, C McKevitt 0-1, D McCloy 0-1, R Casey 0-1, F McCann 0-1.	Referee: T Conway

==== Semi-finals ====
23 January 2022 Semi-final	Ballygiblin (Cork)	4-20 - 0-12	Fullen Gaels (Lancashire)	MW Hire O'Moore Park
	C English 2-3, J O’Sullivan 0-7 (0-5, 0-1 65), S O’Sullivan 1-1, R Donegan 0-4 (0-3f), A Donegan 1-0, D Barry, M Walsh 0-2 each, B Coffey 0-1.	Report	R Spencer 0-6f, D Burke, K Hayes (0-2f), D Power (0-1f) 0-2 each.

23 January 2022 Semi-final	Salthill-Knocknacarra (Galway)	0-11 - 2-26	Mooncoin (Kilkenny)	Gaelic Grounds
	D O’Shea (0-6, 0-2 frees), S Burke, D O’Flaherty, S Kelly, C Crosby, N Hyland (0-1 each).	Report	P Walsh (0-8, 0-6 frees), J Fitzgerald (1-5), K Crowley (1-1), M O’Neill (0-4), K Hogan (0-3), A Croke (0-2), J Delahunty, J Aylward, S Gannon (0-1 each).	Referee: N Wall (Cork)

==== Final ====
5 February 2022 Final	Ballygiblin (Cork)	1-18 - 0-22	Mooncoin (Kilkenny)	Croke Park
	J O’Sullivan 0-9 (0-8f, 0-1 65), D Flynn 0-4, D Barry 1-0, S O’Sullivan, R Donegan 0-1, M Walsh 0-1, Colin English 0-1.	Report	P Walsh 0-7 (0-3f), J Fitzgerald 0-4, M O’Neill 0-4 (0-1f, 0-1 65, 0-1 sideline), K Hogan 0-3, A Croke 0-2, K Crowley 0-1, C Quilty 0-1.	Referee: C Keon (Galway)

== Championship statistics ==
=== Top scorers ===
Overall

Rank	Player	Club	Tally	Total	Matches	Average
1	Patrick Walsh	Mooncoin	5-35	50	5	10.00
2	Tiarnan O'Hare	Craobh Rua	0-36	36	4	9.00
3	Luke McKenna	Emmets	1-31	34	3	11.33
4	Tomás Vaughan	Skeheenarinky	0-25	25	3	8.33
4	Joseph O'Sullivan	Ballygiblin	0-25	25	4	6.25
6	Joe Curtis	Tara Rocks	0-24	24	3	8.00
6	Nigel Dunne	Shamrocks	0-24	24	3	8.00
8	Patrick Fortune	Tara Rocks	4-08	20	3	6.66
8	Declan Foley	Na Magha	0-20	20	2	10.00
10	David Qualter	Maynooth	1-15	18	2	9.00
10	Donal O'Shea	Salthill	0-18	18	2	9.00

In a single game

Rank	Player	Team	Tally	Total	Opposition
1	Patrick Fortune	Tara Rocks	4-06	18	Rock Parnells
1	Luke McKenna	Emmets	0-18	18	Ballela
3	Patrick Walsh	Mooncoin	3-06	15	Shamrocks
3	Malachy Magee	Ballela	2-09	15	Emmets
5	Declan Foley	Na Magha	0-14	14	Emmets
6	Gavin O'Hagan	Cluainín Iomáint	0-12	12	Easkey
6	Donal O'Shea	Salthill	0-12	12	Easkey
6	Tiarnan O'Hare	Craobh Rua	0-12	12	Fullen Gaels
9	Patrick Walsh	Mooncoin	1-08	11	Oliver Plunkett's
9	Luke McKenna	Emmets	1-08	11	Na Magha
9	David Qualter	Maynooth	0-11	11	Trumera
9	Tomás Vaughan	Skeheenarinky	0-11	11	Ogonnelloe
