= Tom Flynn (hurler) =

Irish hurler

Personal information
- Native name: Tomás Ó Floinn (Irish)
- Born: 1938 (age 87–88) Newcastle, County Tipperary, Ireland

Sport
- Sport: Hurling
- Position: Right corner-forward
Club
- Years: Club
- Newcastle
Club titles
- Tipperary titles: 0
Inter-county
- Years: County
- 1957: Tipperary
Inter-county titles
- Munster titles: 0
- All-Irelands: 0
- NHL: 0

Thomas Flynn (born 1938) is an Irish former hurler. At club level he played with Newcastle and at inter-county level was a member of various Tipperary teams at all levels.

== Playing career ==
Flynn first played hurling at club level with Newcastle. He was part of the club's junior team that won the South Tipperary JHC title in 1960. At inter-county level, Tierney first played for Tipperary as part of the minor team that won a fifth consecutive Munster MHC title in 1956. This win was later converted into an All-Ireland MHC medal, with Flynn lining out at right corner-forward.

After a brief spell with the senior team in 1957, Flynn spent three seasons with the junior team. He won a Munster IHC title in 1961, before claiming a second winners' medal in 1963. Flynn's final inter-county game saw him claim an All-Ireland IHC medal following Tipperary's defeat of London.

== Honours ==
Newcastle

- South Tipperary Junior Hurling Championship: 1960

Tipperary

- All-Ireland Intermediate Hurling Championship: 1963
- Munster Intermediate Hurling Championship: 1961, 1963
- All-Ireland Minor Hurling Championship: 1956
- Munster Minor Hurling Championship: 1956
