= Michael Goonan =

Irish Gaelic footballer

Personal information
- Native name: Mícheál Ó Gamhnáin (Irish)
- Born: 1967 (age 58–59) Newcastle, County Tipperary, Ireland
- Height: 6 ft 2 in (188 cm)

Sport
- Sport: Gaelic football
- Position: Midfielder
Club
- Years: Club
- Newcastle
Club titles
- Tipperary titles: 0
Inter-county
- Years: County
- 1986-1991: Tipperary
Inter-county titles
- Munster titles: 0
- All-Irelands: 0
- NFL: 0
- All Stars: 0

Michael Goonan (born 1967) is an Irish retired Gaelic footballer who played as a midfielder and right wing-forward for the Tipperary senior team.

Born in Newcastle, County Tipperary, Goonan first arrived on the inter-county scene at the age of sixteen when he first linked up with the Tipperary minor team before later joining the under-21 and junior sides. Goonan joined the senior panel during the 1986 championship.

At club level Goonan played with Newcastle where he won various intermediate and junior football titles before retiring from club level in the mid 2000s. He also captained the club on a number of occasions.

He retired from inter-county football following the conclusion of the 1991 championship.

After retirement, he remained involved with the GAA. He has trained his local club Newcastle on a number of occasions. He also served a stint as vice-chairman of Newcastle for a couple of years.

== Honours ==
=== Player ===
Tipperary

- Munster Minor Football Championship (1): 1984
