= 2023 Waterford Premier Intermediate Football Championship =

Annual Gaelic football competition season

- Dates: 16 September – 21 October 2023
- Teams: 6
- Sponsor: Cappoquin Logistics
- Champions: Roanmore (1st title); Dean Reidy (captain)
- Runners-up: Rathgormack
- Relegated: Kilmacthomas

Tournament statistics
- Matches played: 11
- Goals scored: 21 (1.91 per match)
- Points scored: 199 (18.09 per match)

The 2023 Waterford Premier Intermediate Football Championship was the inaugural staging of the Waterford Premier Intermediate Football Championship since its establishment by the Waterford County Board. The draw for the group stage placing took place on 7 February 2023. The championship ran from 16 September to 21 October 2023.

The final was played on 21 October 2023 at Walsh Park in Waterford, between Roanmore and Rathgormack, in what was their first ever meeting in the final. Roanmore won the match by 3–08 to 1–05 to claim their first ever championship title.

== Group A ==
=== Group A table ===
Advance to semi-finals Advance to quarter-finals

Team	Matches				Score			Pts
Team	Pld	W	D	L	For	Against	Diff	Pts
Roanmore	2	2	0	0	37	9	28	4
St Saviour's	2	1	0	1	7	13	-6	2
Kilmacthomas	2	0	0	2	2	24	-22	0

=== Group A results ===
16 September 2023 Round 1	Roanmore	1-10 - 0-07	St Saviour's	Gracedieu Grounds

23 September 2023 Round 2	Roanmore	3-15 - 0-02	Kilmacthomas	Páirc Uí Bhriain

30 September 2023 Round 3	St Saviour's	w/o - scr.	Kilmacthomas	Kill GAA Field

== Group B ==
=== Group B table ===
Advance to semi-finals Advance to quarter-finals

Team	Matches				Score			Pts
Team	Pld	W	D	L	For	Against	Diff	Pts
Ballinameela	2	1	1	0	17	15	2	3
Rathgormack	2	1	0	1	23	17	6	2
Modeligo	2	0	1	1	20	28	-8	1

=== Group B results ===
16 September 2023 Round 1	Ballinameela	0-07 - 0-05	Rathgormack	Fraher Field

23 September 2023 Round 2	Ballinameela	0-10 - 0-10	Modeligo	Bushy Park

30 September 2023 Round 3	Rathgormack	3-09 - 1-07	Modeligo	Fraher Field

== Knockout stage ==
=== Quarter-finals ===
8 October 2023 Quarter-final	Modeligo	0-11 - 0-06	St Saviour's	Páirc Naomh Bríd

8 October 2023 Quarter-final	Rathgormack	5-15 - 0-07	Kilmacthomas	St Molleran's Park

=== Relegation playoff ===
13 October 2023 Playoff	St Saviour's	1-16 - 0-07	Kilmacthomas	St Molleran's Park

=== Semi-finals ===
14 October 2023 Semi-final	Roanmore	1-09 - 0-09	Modeligo	Bill Delaney Park

14 October 2023 Semi-final	Rathgormack	2-10 - 0-14 (aet)	Ballinameela	Páirc Naomh Bríd

=== Final ===
21 October 2023 Final	Roanmore	3-08 - 1-05	Rathgormack	Walsh Park
	E Nolan 1-4, S Nolan 1-1, S Mackey 1-0, D Reidy 0-2, C Ryan 0-1.		J Kirwan 1-0, S Kirwan 0-2, D Crotty 0-1, P Drohan 0-1, S Lacey 0-1.	Referee: M Curran (Old Parish)
