= 1951 Waterford Senior Hurling Championship =

Annual hurling competition season

- Champions: Mount Sion (8th title)
- Runners-up: Dungarvan

The 1951 Waterford Senior Hurling Championship was the 51st staging of the Waterford Senior Hurling Championship since its establishment by the Waterford County Board in 1897.

Tourin were the defending champions.

On 7 October 1951, Mount Sion won the championship after a 7–08 to 0–09 defeat of Dungarvan in the final. This was their 8th championship title overall and their first title since 1949.
