= 1953 Waterford Senior Hurling Championship =

Annual hurling competition season

- Champions: Mount Sion (9th title)
- Runners-up: Tourin

The 1953 Waterford Senior Hurling Championship was the 53rd staging of the Waterford Senior Hurling Championship since its establishment by the Waterford County Board in 1897.

Clonea were the defending champions.

On 11 October 1953, Mount Sion won the championship after a 7–11 to 1–01 defeat of Tourin in the final. This was their 9th championship title overall and their first title since 1951.
