= South Tipperary GAA =

South Tipperary GAA (CLG Tiobraid Árann Theas) is a Gaelic Athletic Association division in County Tipperary, Ireland founded in 1907. The division is one of four affiliated to the Tipperary County Board. It organises competitions for the clubs within the division, from Under 12 up to the adult level in both hurling and Gaelic football. There are currently 23 active GAA clubs in the division. The division is known for its strength in Tipperary football, with south clubs having won 90 Tipperary Senior Football titles between them. The most successful clubs being Clonmel Commercials and Fethard, with 22 and 21 titles respectively. South clubs have only won 4 Tipperary Senior Hurling titles, the most recent being Mullinahone in 2002.

== Clubs ==
- Ardfinnan
- Ballingarry
- Ballybacon-Grange
- Ballylooby-Castlegrace
- Ballyporeen
- Cahir
- Carrick Davins
- Carrick Swan
- CJ Kickhams Mullinahone
- Clerihan
- Clonmel Commercials
- Clonmel Óg
- Father Sheehy's
- Fethard
- Grangemockler-Ballyneale
- Killenaule
- Kilsheelan-Kilcash
- Marlfield
- Moyle Rovers
- Newcastle
- Skeheenarinky
- St Mary's
- St Patrick's

== Hurling ==
=== Championship Grades ===
Championship	Clubs
Senior
Senior	St Mary's
Intermediate
Premier Intermediate	Carrick Swan
Premier Intermediate	CJ Kickhams Mullinahone
Premier Intermediate	Killenaule
Intermediate	Ballingarry
Intermediate	Ballybacon-Grange
Intermediate	Carrick Davins
Intermediate	Fethard
Intermediate	Kilsheelan-Kilcash
Intermediate	Moyle Rovers
Intermediate	Skeheenarinky
Junior
Junior A	Ballingarry (2)
Junior A	Ballylooby-Castlegrace
Junior A	Cahir
Junior A	Carrick Swan (2)
Junior A	CJ Kickhams Mullinahone (2)
Junior A	Clonmel Óg
Junior A	Father Sheehy's
Junior A	Grangemockler-Ballyneale
Junior A	Killenaule (2)
Junior A	St Mary's (2)
Junior A	St Patrick's
Junior B	Cahir (2)
Junior B	Carrick Swan (3)
Junior B	Clerihan
Junior B	Killenaule (3)
Junior B	Kilsheelan-Kilcash (2)
Junior B	Moyle Rovers (2)
Junior B	Newcastle
Junior B	St Patrick's (2)
Junior C	Ballingarry (3)
Junior C	Ballybacon-Grange (2)
Junior C	Carrick Davins (2)
Junior C	CJ Kickhams Mullinahone (3)
Junior C	Clerihan (2)
Junior C	Clonmel Óg (2)
Junior C	Father Sheehy's (2)
Junior C	Fethard (2)
Junior C	Marlfield
Junior C	Skeheenarinky (2)
Junior C	St Mary's (3)

=== Non-hurling clubs ===
Clubs who do not play hurling but are affiliated sister clubs (3)

- Ardfinnan (Ballybacon-Grange hurling)
- Ballyporeen (Skeheenarinky hurling)
- Clonmel Commercials (St Mary's hurling)

== Football ==
=== Championship Grades ===
Championship	Clubs
Senior
Senior	Ardfinnan
Senior	Ballyporeen
Senior	Clonmel Commercials
Senior	Killenaule
Senior	Kilsheelan-Kilcash
Senior	Moyle Rovers
Intermediate
Intermediate	Cahir
Intermediate	CJ Kickhams Mullinahone
Intermediate	Clonmel Commercials (2)
Intermediate	Clonmel Óg
Intermediate	Fethard
Intermediate	Grangemockler-Ballyneale
Junior
Premier Junior	Carrick Swan
Premier Junior	Father Sheehy's
Premier Junior	Moyle Rovers (2)
Junior A	Ballingarry
Junior A	Ballylooby-Castlegrace
Junior A	Clerihan
Junior A	St Patrick's
Junior B	Ardfinnan (2)
Junior B	Ballyporeen (2)
Junior B	Cahir (2)
Junior B	Carrick Davins
Junior B	CJ Kickhams Mullinahone (2)
Junior B	Clerihan (2)
Junior B	Clonmel Commercials (3)
Junior B	Clonmel Óg (2)
Junior B	Fethard (2)
Junior B	Grangemockler-Ballyneale (2)
Junior B	Killenaule (2)
Junior B	Kilsheelan-Kilcash (2)
Junior B	Moyle Rovers (3)
Junior B	Newcastle
Junior B	St Patrick's (2)

=== Non-football clubs ===
Clubs who do not play football at any level are (1)

- Marlfield

Clubs who do not play football but are affiliated sister clubs (3)

- Ballybacon-Grange ( Ardfinnan football)
- Skeheenarinky (Ballyporeen football)
- St Mary's (Clonmel Commercials football)

== Divisional Competitions ==
=== Legend ===
- Gold – County champions
- Silver – County runners-up

Competition	Year	Champions	Runners-up
Championship
South Tipperary Senior Hurling Championship	2026	St Mary's (Note: St Mary's won Tipperary Premier Intermediate Hurling Championship. They competed in the South Tipperary Senior Hurling Championship due to there only being one senior hurling club in South Tipperary in 2026.)	CJ Kickhams Mullinahone
South Tipperary Senior Football Championship	2026	Clonmel Commercials	Grangemockler-Ballyneale
South Tipperary Intermediate Hurling Championship	2026	Skeheenarinky	Ballingarry
South Tipperary Intermediate Football Championship	2026	Killenaule	Cahir
South Tipperary Premier Junior Football Championship	2026	Carrick Swan	Father Sheehy's
South Tipperary Junior A Hurling Championship	2026	St Patrick's	Fethard
South Tipperary Junior A Football Championship	2026	Ballylooby-Castlegrace	Clerihan
South Tipperary Junior B Hurling Championship	2026	Clerihan	Cahir
South Tipperary Junior B Football Championship	2026	Killenaule	Carrick Davins
South Tipperary Junior C Hurling Championship	2026	Ballingarry	Ballybacon-Grange
South Tipperary Junior C Football Championship (Note: There is no county championship for Junior C Football.)	2026	Ballyporeen	Clerihan
South Tipperary U21A Hurling Championship	2025	Ballingarry	St Patrick's
South Tipperary U21B Hurling Championship	2026	Moyle Rovers	Knockmealdown Gaels (Note: Knockmealdown Gaels is an amalgamation of Father Sheehy's and Ballylooby-Castlegrace.)
South Tipperary U21A Football Championship	2025	Moyle Rovers	Clonmel Commercials
South Tipperary U21B Football Championship	2025	Knockmealdown Gaels	Killenaule

== Former Clubs ==
=== Defunct Clubs ===
- Bohercrowe (Tipperary Senior Football Champions in 1888 and 1889)
- Clonmel Shamrocks (All-Ireland Senior Football Champions 1900 and 8-time Tipperary Senior Football Champions)
- Coolmoyne (South Tipperary Hurling Champions in 1951)
- Moyglass (South Tipperary Hurling Champions in 1934)
- Old Bridge (Tipperary Senior Football Champions in 1952)
- Racecourse (South Tipperary Hurling Champions in 1909 and 1910)
- Tipperary O'Leary's (Tipperary Senior Football Champions in 1909)

=== Moved to West Tipperary in 1930 ===
- Aherlow
- Arravale Rovers
- Cappawhite
- Cashel King Cormacs (Also competed in Mid Tipperary)
- Éire Óg Annacarthy
- Galtee Rovers
- Golden-Kilfeacle
- Lattin-Cullen
- Rockwell Rovers
- Solohead
