= 1960 Waterford Senior Hurling Championship =

Annual hurling competition season

- Dates: 8 May – 9 October 1960
- Teams: 13
- Champions: Mount Sion (16th title); Frankie Walsh (captain)
- Runners-up: Erin's Own; Ted O'Donnell (captain)

Tournament statistics
- Matches played: 12
- Goals scored: 98 (8.17 per match)
- Points scored: 137 (11.42 per match)

The 1960 Waterford Senior Hurling Championship was the 60th staging of the Waterford Senior Hurling Championship since its establishment by the Waterford County Board in 1897. The championship ran from 8 May to 9 October 1960.

Mount Sion were the defending champions.

The final was played on 9 October 1960 at the Gaelic Field in Waterford, between Mount Sion and Erin's Own, in what was their second consecutive meeting in the final. Mount Sion won the match by 5–09 to 2–05 to claim their 16th championship title overall and an eighth consecutive title.

== Team changes ==
=== To Championship ===
Promoted from the Waterford Junior Hurling Championship

- Brickey Rangers

== Results ==
=== First round ===
8 May 1960 First round	Abbeyside	2-04 - 0-05	Ballygunner	Waterford Gaelic Field

15 May 1960 First round	Ferrybank	4-04 - 5-05	Geraldines	Waterford Gaelic Field

31 July 1960 First round	Cappoquin	2-04 - 5-07	Erin's Own	Fraher Field

31 July 1960 First round	Dungarvan	4-03 - 4-02	St Ronan's	Cappoquin Grounds

2 August 1960 First round	Faughs	6-04 - 5-02	Brickey Rangers	Dunhill Grounds

=== Quarter-finals ===
14 August 1960 Quarter-final	De La Salle	5-03 - 8-09	Dunhill	Waterford Gaelic Field

14 August 1960 Quarter-final	Mount Sion	9-12 - 1-08	Geraldines	Fraher Field

28 August 1960 Quarter-final	Dungarvan	3-02 - 9-12	Erin's Own	Fraher Field

28 August 1960 Quarter-final	Faughs	4-06 - 3-04	Abbeyside	Dunhill Grounds

=== Semi-finals ===
25 September 1960 Semi-final	Erin's Own	5-04 - 2-08	Faughs	Waterford Gaelic Field

25 September 1960 Semi-final	Dunhill	0-10 - 5-05	Mount Sion	Dunhill Grounds

=== Final ===
9 October 1960 Final	Mount Sion	5-09 - 2-05	Erin's Own	Waterford Gaelic Field
