= Waterford Premier Intermediate Football Championship =

Annual hurling competition for Gaelic football clubs in Waterford

- Current season or competition: 2024 Waterford Premier Intermediate Football Championship
- Irish: Craobh Príomh-Idirmheánach Peile Phort Láirge
- Code: Gaelic football
- Founded: 2023; 2 years ago
- Region: Waterford (GAA)
- No. of teams: 7
- Title holders: Stradbally (1st title)
- Sponsors: Cappoquin Logistics
- Official website: Waterford GAA

The Waterford Premier Intermediate Football Championship (abbreviated to the Waterford PIFC) is an annual Gaelic football competition organised by the Waterford County Board of the Gaelic Athletic Association and contested by the top-ranking intermediate clubs in the county of Waterford in Ireland. It is the second tier overall in the entire Waterford football championship system.

The Waterford Premier Intermediate Championship was introduced in 2023 following a restructuring of the intermediate championship.

In its current format, the championship begins in mid summer. The seven participating teams are drawn into two groups and play each other in a round-robin system. All seven teams proceed to the knockout phase that culminates with the final match at Walsh Park. The winner of the Waterford Premier Intermediate Championship qualifies for the subsequent Munster Club Championship.

Stradbally are the title holders after defeating Modeligo by 1–18 to 3–06 in the 2024 final.

== History ==
On 31 January 2022, Waterford County Board delegates voted on the restructuring of the entire intermediate football championship system following a review process. It was decided to establish an all-county six-team premier intermediate football championship for 2023. These six teams were made up of the two teams relegated from the Waterford SFC and the 2022 Eastern and Western intermediate championship finalists.

== Format ==
=== Group stage ===
The seven teams are divided into two groups of four and three respectively. Over the course of the group stage, each team plays once against the others in the group. Two points are awarded for a win, one for a draw and zero for a loss. The teams are ranked in the group stage table by points gained, then scoring difference and then their head-to-head record. All seven teams from both groups qualify for the knockout stage but are seeded.

=== Knockout stage ===
Quarter-finals: This round features three matches. The three winning teams advance to the semi-finals. The three losing teams advance to the relegation playoffs.

Semi-finals: The three quarter-final winners and the top-ranked team from the group stage contest this round. The two winners from these games advance to the final.

Final: The two semi-final winners contest the final. The winning team are declared champions.

=== Promotion and relegation ===
At the end of the championship, the winning team is automatically promoted to the Waterford Senior Championship for the following season. The three defeated teams from the quarter-final stage participate in a series of playoffs, with the losing team being relegated to the Waterford Intermediate Championship.

== Qualification for subsequent competitions ==
The Waterford Premier Intermediate Championship winners qualify for the subsequent Munster Intermediate Club Football Championship.

== List of finals ==
Year	Winners		Runners-up		Winning captain	Venue	#
Year	Club	Score	Club	Score	Winning captain	Venue	#
2025	Stradbally	3-08	Brickey Rangers	1-11	Daniel Weldon	Dungarvan	
2024	Stradbally	1-18	Modeligo	3-06	Liam Fennelly	Páirc Naomh Bríd	
2023	Roanmore	3-08	Rathgormack	1-05	Dean Reidy	Walsh Park	
