= Ballyporeen GAA =

Gaelic sports club in County Tipperary, Ireland

- CLG Béal Átha Póirín
- Colours: Red and black
- Coordinates: 52°20′55.11″N 7°25′09.72″W

Playing kits
Standard colours

Ballyporeen GAA is a Gaelic Athletic Association club located in the parish of Ballyporeen in County Tipperary in Ireland. The club plays Gaelic football at Senior level as part of the South division of Tipperary GAA. The handball section of the club has also had considerable success.

The club fields Minor, Under-21 and Senior football teams. At juvenile level the Ballyporeen club also takes in footballers from, and provides hurlers for the hurling club in the neighbouring townland of Skeheenarinky, part of the same parish.

== History ==
The club was founded in 1887, just three years after the formation of the GAA.

Historically the club has played under various names including Templetenny Rangers, Western Rangers and the Brian Borus, a team made up of members from Ballyporeen and Clogheen. Currently (2016) the team is closely linked with the hurling club in Skeheenarinky. Their common home ground is in Ballyporeen where there is access to modern dressing rooms and floodlighting.

Ballyporeen's most notable victories at county level to date were in 1992 and 2013, when it secured the Intermediate titles. The club advanced to the county's Senior championship, and retained that rank in a relegation play-off in October 2015.

Ballyporeen took part in the fourth series of the reality television show, Celebrity Bainisteoir, which was broadcast in Autumn 2011. Model Gillian Quinn was the club's celebrity mentor. After losing the "swim off" against the Laois club Killeshin, the latter got home advantage and went on to eliminate Ballyporeen in the first round.

== Honours ==
- Tipperary Intermediate Football Championship (2)
  - 1992, 2013
- Tipperary Junior 'A' Football Championship (1)
  - 1987
- Tipperary U21 'B' Football Championship (2)
  - 1990, 2011
- South Tipperary Intermediate Football Championship (4)
  - 1988, 1992, 2007, 2013
- Tipperary U21 'C' Football Championship (1)
  - 2001
- Tipperary Minor 'B' Football Championship (1)
  - 1986 (as Brian Boru's), 2011
- Tipperary Minor 'C' Football Championship (1)
  - 2006
- South Tipperary Junior 'A' Football Championship (5)
  - 1928, 1969, 1970, 1985, 1987
- South Tipperary Junior 'B' Football Championship (4)
  - 1991, 1994, 2002, 2004
- South Tipperary U21 'B' Football Championship (4)
  - 1990, 1997, 2004, 2011
- South Tipperary U21 'C' Football Championship (1)
  - 2001
- South Tipperary Minor 'A' Football Championship (1)
  - 1966
- South Tipperary Minor 'C' Football Championship (2)
  - 2005, 2006

== Notable players ==
The following Ballyporeen clubmen have played at county Senior level in at least two seasons:

- Conor Sweeney Tipperary Minor footballer 2007, Minor captain 2008, U-21 panel 2009–11, Senior panel 2010–16, Munster SFC winning captain 2020 captained county IFC winning team 2013
- John O'Callaghan, Minor All-Ireland winning captain with Tipperary 2011, Senior panel 2011-12
- Eoin Kearney, Tipperary Senior panel 2008, 2010
- Tom Macken, Tipperary Senior panel 1989, 1991–96
- Eamon Maher, Tipperary Senior panel 1989, 1990, 1994
- Patsy Condon, Tipperary Senior panel 1969, 1971

== Handball ==
Ballyporeen's first handball court was built in 1908 and the club was formed the following year, in its history producing 21 All-Ireland Champions and numerous County and Provincial Champions. Con "Shine" Moloney (1906-1963) and Paddy Ormonde brought the first Senior All Ireland Hardball Doubles Handball Championship to Ballyporeen in 1929, and again in 1931. In 1930 Tommy Moloney (1908-1943) and Ned O'Gorman won the All Ireland Junior Hardball Doubles Handball Championship for Ballyporeen. Eddie Corbett from Ballyporeen has won the United Sports Panel Award for Handball in 1987, 1993 and 1994 and shared it with John O'Donoghue in 1990 and 1991. Today Ballyporeen Handball & Racquetball Club has one glass backwalled 40 X 20 court and one 60 X 30 court.

=== Ballyporeen Handball Titles ===
World Champions

- Eddie Corbett - World doubles champion, 40/20 open 1994.
- Billy McCarthy - World doubles champion, 40/20 masters 'B' 1994.
- Pat Ryan - World singles champion, 40/20 golden masters 'B' 2012.
- Jason English - World doubles champion, 40/20, 15 & Under 2012.

United States Champion

- Eddie Corbett- USHA singles champion, 40/20 open 1993.

All Ireland Champions

- Paddy Ormonde, Con "Shine" Maloney, Ned O'Gorman, Tommy Maloney, Paddy Hickey, Tom Breedy, Dermot Wall, Paddy Macken, Jimmy Walsh, Billy McCarthy, Michael Kennelly, Eddie Corbett, Joe English, Pat Ryan, Frank O'Brien, Michael Meaney, John Corbett, Aidan Supple, Paddy Supple, Michael John Meaney, Darragh Lyons, Anthony Crotty, Jason Cahill, Jason English, Ceallach Hennessy, Micky Maher, Tiernan O'Brien, Adrian English, John Ryan, Jack Coughlan, Adam English, Darragh Flynn, Riann Hennessy, Aidan O'Donovan and Christy English.
