= Darragh Fives =

Irish hurler (born 1992)

Personal information
- Native name: Darragh Ó Cuaig (Irish)
- Born: 26 March 1992 (age 34) Waterford, Ireland
- Occupation: Secondary school teacher
- Height: 6 ft 1 in (185 cm)

Sport
- Sport: Hurling
- Position: Left wing-back
Club
- Years: Club
- 2009-present: Tourin–Ballinwillin
Club titles
- Waterford titles: 0
College
- Years: College
- 2010-2014: University College Cork
College titles
- Fitzgibbon titles: 1
Inter-county*
Years	County	Apps (scores)
2011-present	Waterford	25 (0-00)
Inter-county titles
- Munster titles: 1
- All-Irelands: 0
- NHL: 1
- All Stars: 0
- *Inter County team apps and scores correct as of 13:20, 14 June 2019.

Darragh Fives (born 26 March 1992) is an Irish hurler who plays for Waterford Junior Championship club Tourin–Ballinwillin and at inter-county level with the Waterford senior hurling team. He usually lines out as a left wing-back.

== Playing career ==
=== University College Cork ===
During his studies at University College Cork, Fives joined the senior hurling team. On 3 March 2012, he was at centre-back when UCC defeated the Cork Institute of Technology by 2–15 to 2–14 to win the Fitzgibbon Cup.

On 2 March 2013, Fives was again at centre-back when UCC reached a second successive Fitzgibbon Cup final. He claimed a second winners' medal following a 2–17 to 2–12 defeat of Mary Immaculate College.

=== Tourin ===
Fives joined the Tourin club at a young age and played in all grades at juvenile and underage levels before eventually joining the club's top adult team at junior level.

On 25 October 2009, Fives lined out at left wing-forward when Tourin faced Kill in the Waterford Junior Championship final. He ended the game as top scorer with 0-09 and collected a winners' medal following the 1–15 to 1–12 victory.

=== Waterford ===
==== Minor and under-21 ====
Fives first lined out for Waterford as a member of the minor team during the 2009 Munster Championship. He made his first appearance for the team on 19 April 2009 when he lined out at left wing-back in a 0–14 to 1–12 defeat by Clare. Fives retained his position when Waterford faced Tipperary in the Munster final. He ended the game with a winners' medal following an 0–18 to 1–13 victory.

On 11 July 2010, Fives played in his second successive Munster final. Lining out at centre-back, he ended the game on the losing side after a 1–16 to 1–11 defeat by Clare.

Fives joined the Waterford under-21 team in advance of the 2011 Munster Championship. He made his first appearance for the team on 1 July 2011 when he lined out at full-back in a 4–12 to 1–16 defeat by Tipperary.

On 19 July 2012, Fives was a late inclusion on the Waterford team that faced Clare in the Munster Championship. Lining out at centre-back, he ended the game on the losing side after a 2–22 to 0–09 defeat.

Lyons was eligible for the under-21 grade for the third and final season in 2013. He made his only appearance for the team on 18 July when he played at centre-back in a 2–15 to 0–17 defeat by Clare.

==== Senior ====
Fives made his first appearance for the Waterford senior team on 23 January 2011 when he lined out at right wing-back in a 1–12 to 0–11 defeat of the Cork Institute of Technology in the pre-season Waterford Crystal Cup. On 5 February 2011, he won a Waterford Crystal Cup title after lining out at right corner-back in a 0–21 to 0–16 defeat of Cork in the final. Fives made his first appearance in the National League on 13 February 2011 in a 3–16 to 2–19 draw with Dublin. He made his Munster Championship debut on 12 June 2011 when he lined out at right corner-back in a 3–15 to 3–14 defeat of Limerick. Fives was switched to right wing-back when Waterford lost the Munster final to Tipperary by 7–19 to 0–19 on 10 July 2011.

On 15 July 2012, Fives was selected amongst the substitutes when Waterford faced Tipperary in the Munster final. He remained on the bench for the entire game which Waterford eventually lost by 7–19 to 0–19.

On 3 May 2015, Fives failed to make the starting fifteen for the National League final against Cork. He remained on the bench for the entire game but collected a winners' medal after a 1–24 to 0–17 victory. On 12 July 2015, Fives came on as a substitute for Jake Dillon when Waterford were beaten for the fourth time in six seasons by Tipperary in the Munster final.

On 1 May 2016, Fives was at left corner-back when Waterford drew 0-22 apiece with Clarein the National League final. He retained the left corner-back position for the replay, which Waterford lost by 1–23 to 2–19. On 10 July 2016, Fives was at left wing-back for the Munster final, with Waterford eventually losing by 5–19 to 0–13.

On 3 September 2017, Fives lined out at left corner-forward when Waterford faced Galway in the All-Ireland final. He was held scoreless throughout the game with Waterford eventually losing by 0–26 to 2–17.

On 31 March 2019, Fives was selected on the bench when Waterford faced Limerick in the National League final. He remained as a non-playing substitute for the entire game which Waterford lost by 1–24 to 0–19 defeat.

== Personal life ==
Fives's brother, Shane, has also played for Waterford at all levels. His granduncle, Jim Fives, played for Waterford and Galway and was selected on the 1984 Centenary Team of hurlers who did not win an All-Ireland medal.

== Career statistics ==
As of match played 8 June 2019.

Team	Year	National League			Munster		All-Ireland		Total	
Team	Year	Division	Apps	Score	Apps	Score	Apps	Score	Apps	Score
Waterford	2011	Division 1	6	0-00	2	0-00	2	0-00	10	0-00
Waterford	2012	Division 1A	4	0-00	0	0-00	1	0-00	5	0-00
Waterford	2013	Division 1A	4	0-01	1	0-00	3	0-04	8	0-05
Waterford	2014	Division 1A	1	1-00	0	0-00	2	0-01	3	1-01
Waterford	2015	Division 1B	0	0-00	1	0-00	2	0-00	3	0-00
Waterford	2016	Division 1A	6	0-03	2	0-01	1	0-00	9	0-04
Waterford	2017	Division 1A	0	0-00	1	0-00	5	0-03	6	0-03
Waterford	2018	Division 1A	1	0-01	1	0-00	—		2	0-01
Waterford	2019	Division 1B	0	0-00	1	0-00	—		1	0-00
Career total			22	1-05	9	0-01	16	0-08	47	1-14

== Honours ==
University College Cork

- Fitzgibbon Cup (2): 2012, 2013

Tourin

- Waterford Junior Hurling Championship (1): 2009

Waterford

- National Hurling League (1): 2015
- Munster Minor Hurling Championship (1): 2009
