= Galtee Castle =

Mansion in County Tipperary, Ireland

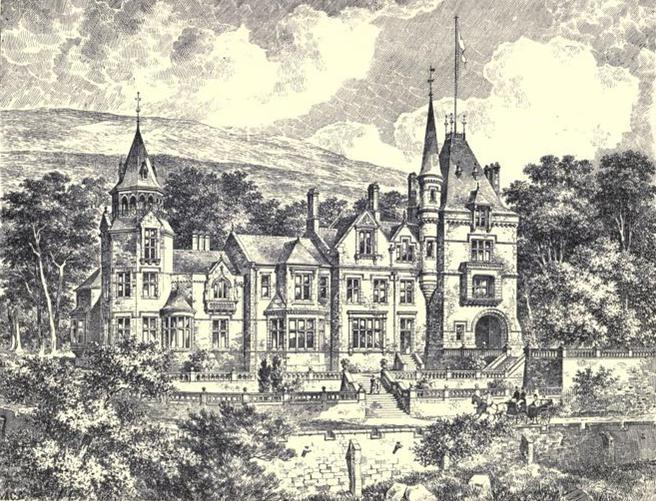
- Drawing of castle c.1895

- Location within Ireland
- 52°19′18″N 08°10′26″W
- Location: Skeheenarinky, County Tipperary, Ireland.

History
- Built: 18th and 19th century
- Built for: Earl of Kingston
- Demolished: 1941

Galtee Castle was a mansion that was situated on the foothills of the Galtee Mountains at Skeheenarinky in County Tipperary, Ireland approximately 10 km. from Mitchelstown.

== Origins ==
The original structure was built as a hunting lodge for the 2nd Earl of Kingston around 1780. The 3rd Earl further remodeled it (c.1825).

In the 1850s, the Kingstons were forced to sell off vast amounts of their landed estate due to debts, including the lodge and approximately 20,000 acres (81 km^{2})surrounding it. This became a new estate, the majority of which remained leased to tenant farmers.

The building was remodeled and expanded c.1892 when its new owner Abel Buckley inherited the estate from his brother Nathaniel, he had previously purchased sole ownership in 1873.

== Destruction ==
The Land Commission; a government agency, acquired the demesne and house in the late 1930s, after allocating the land between afforestation and farmers, the house was offered for sale. The commission accepted an offer from Fr. Tobin of Glanworth, County Cork, who wished to use the stone and the slates to build a new church in his parish. The building was thus torn down and dismantled c. 1941.

Today very little is left on the site of the former house; some of the lower base foundations are all that remain. Nearby are some estate cottages and two gate houses. The woods and trails around the site have been developed as a public amenity area known as Galtee Castle Woods.

== Related ==
- Mitchelstown Castle
