= 1958 Waterford Senior Hurling Championship =

Annual hurling competition season

- Champions: Mount Sion (14th title)
- Runners-up: Faughs

The 1958 Waterford Senior Hurling Championship was the 58th staging of the Waterford Senior Hurling Championship since its establishment by the Waterford County Board in 1897.

Mount Sion were the defending champions.

On 28 September 1958, Mount Sion won the championship after a 6–10 to 1–08 defeat of Faughs in the final. This was their 14th championship title overall and their sixth title in succession.
