= 1955 Waterford Senior Hurling Championship =

Annual hurling competition season

- Champions: Mount Sion (11th title)
- Runners-up: Abbeyside

The 1955 Waterford Senior Hurling Championship was the 55th staging of the Waterford Senior Hurling Championship since its establishment by the Waterford County Board in 1897.

Mount Sion were the defending champions.

On 9 October 1955, Mount Sion won the championship after a 2–10 to 3–04 defeat of Abbeyside in the final. This was their 11th championship title overall and their third title in succession.
