= 1954 Waterford Senior Hurling Championship =

Annual hurling competition season

- Champions: Mount Sion (10th title)
- Runners-up: Erin's Own

The 1954 Waterford Senior Hurling Championship was the 54th staging of the Waterford Senior Hurling Championship since its establishment by the Waterford County Board in 1897.

Mount Sion were the defending champions.

On 31 October 1953, Mount Sion won the championship after a 3–14 to 5–02 defeat of Erin's Own in the final. This was their 10th championship title overall and their second title in succession.
