= Ballyporeen =

Village in County Tipperary, Ireland

Ballyporeen Béal Átha Póirin
- Village
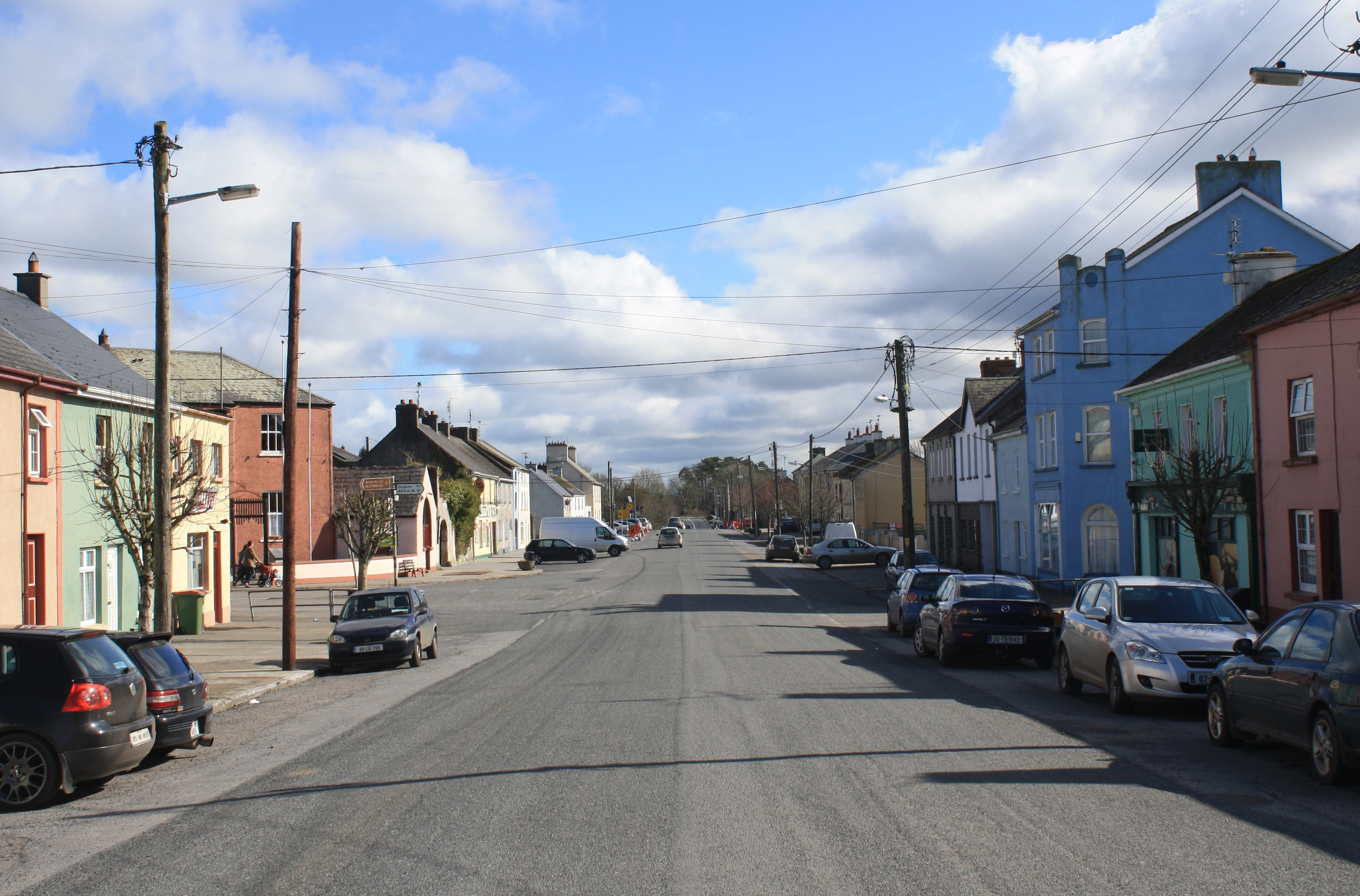
- The R665 through Ballyporeen, once part of the main Dublin–Cork coach road.

- Location in Ireland
- Coordinates: 52.26994°N 8.10001°W
- Country: Ireland
- Province: Munster
- County: County Tipperary
- Dáil Éireann: Tipperary South

Population (2022)
  - Total: 346
- Irish grid reference: R930132

Ballyporeen (Irish: Béal Átha Póirín) is a village in County Tipperary, Ireland. Located on the R665 regional road, now bypassed, Ballyporeen was previously on the main route between Dublin and Cork. The 2022 census recorded a village population of 346, up from 318 as of the 2016 census.

== Location ==
Ballyporeen lies in the Galtee-Vee Valley with the Galtee Mountains to the north and the Knockmealdowns to the south. The River Duag, which is a tributary of the Suir, runs through the village. It is located on the R665 regional road approximately 11 km (6.8 mi) and 15 km (9.3 mi), respectively, from the larger towns of Mitchelstown and Cahir. The village is approximately 11 km (6.8 mi) from junction 12 of the M8 motorway.

== Name ==
The village's English name, Ballyporeen, derives from the Irish Béal Átha Póirín or Béal Átha an Phóirín. While the term Béal Átha is common in Irish placenames and means "ford-mouth [of]", the meaning of Póirín is not clear. Writing in A Dictionary of British Place-Names (2003), Anthony David Mills suggests that the name is translated as "ford-mouth of the round stones". The Placenames Database of Ireland lists a possible derivation as "ford-mouth of the little hole". Writing for the Canadian Journal of Irish Studies (2014), Máirtín Mac Con Iomaire suggests that Póirín could mean "little potato" or may also "relate to either a hole for dying cloth indigo or an enclosure for lambs being weaned".

One alternative theory suggests that the name was corrupted from the surname "Power", an Anglo-Norman family who reputedly had connections with the area. In an article submitted to the Journal of the Waterford and South East of Ireland Archaeological Society in 1896, W. H. Grattan Flood refers to Templetenny Church as being located in "Ballyporeen, or Powerstown".

== History ==
Evidence of ancient settlement in the area, as recorded in the Record of Monuments and Places, include a number of enclosure, ringfort, fulacht fiadh and castle sites in the townlands of Ballyporeen, Carrigavisteal, Dangan, Moher and Newcastle.

In the 18th century, Ballyporeen was on the main coach road between Cork and Dublin, and it was developed as a linear settlement, in a planned fashion, along what is now the R665 road and the village's main street.

In addition to the economic growth afforded by boarding houses and inns for travellers, a mill at lower Main Street also provided local employment opportunities. Known as Kingston's Mills, this mill was operational until at least 1811.

One of the factors which impacted the development and expansion of the village was the involvement of the King family, the Earls of Kingston, who were the main landlords in the area. They owned the market rights on the estate and, by at least 1810, three open air markets were being held in the village three times a year. The fact the mill also bore their name indicates that they may also have been involved in its creation.

Robert King, the 2nd Earl of Kingston, may have been responsible for the village's planned street design. He initiated an extensive building programme across the family's estate in the late 18th century. Ground rents were kept low in the village to attract shopkeepers and tradespeople. The first edition Ordnance Survey maps (circa 1840) show the basic layout of the village as it is today encompassing the wide straight main street.

Samuel Lewis' Topographical Dictionary of Ireland (published in 1837) describes the village as being located in the barony of Iffa and Offa West and containing 113 houses and 513 inhabitants.

A number of public buildings and infrastructure in the village, including the Catholic church and Ballyporeen Bridge, date to the mid- to late-19th century. The Record of Protected Structures, as maintained by Tipperary County Council, lists several protected structures in Ballyporeen, including the Catholic Church of the Assumption, several buildings associated with the former convent and a covered corbelled well at Ballyporeen Bridge.

== People ==
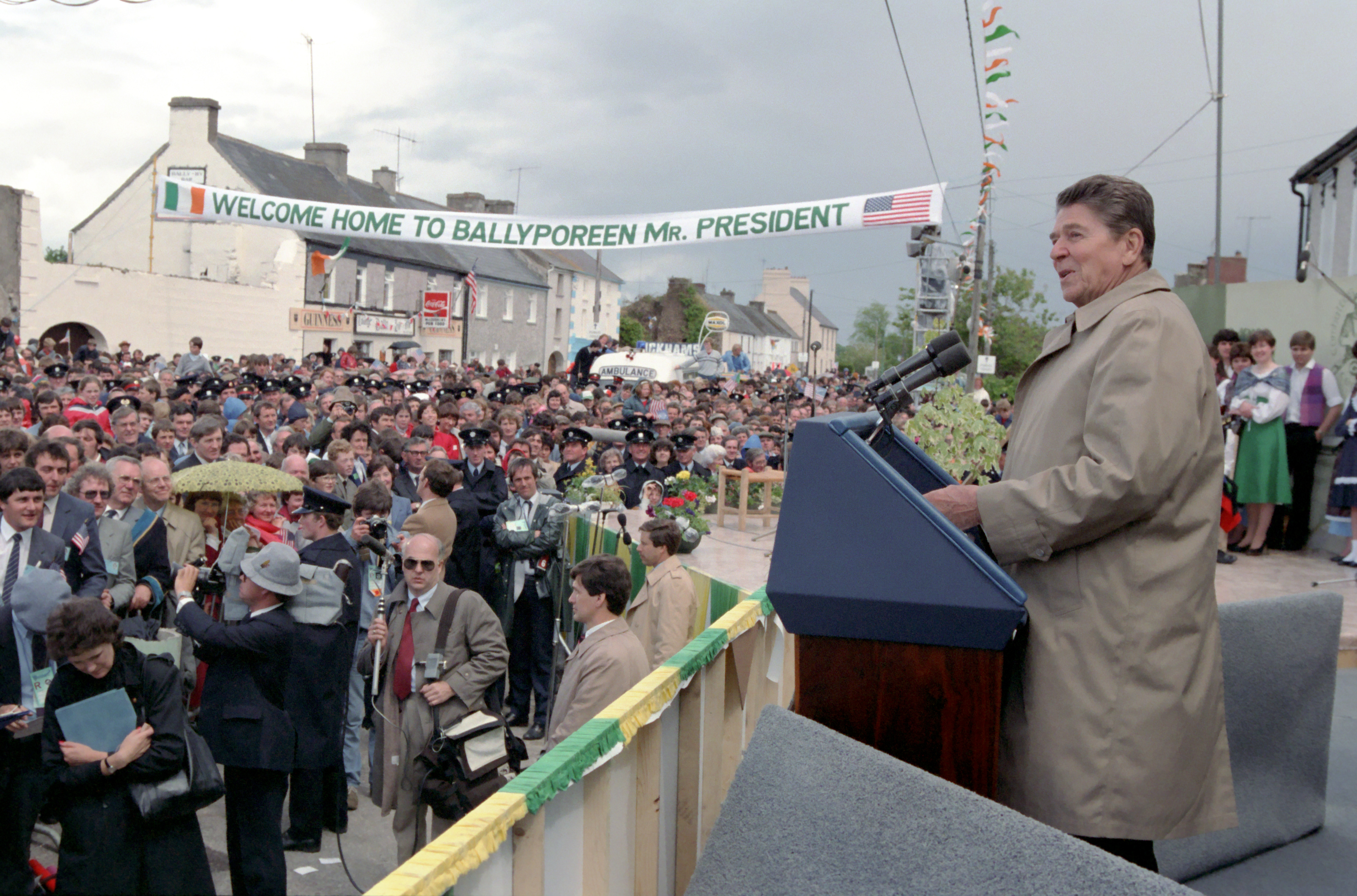
Ronald Reagan speaking in Ballyporeen in 1984

Ballyporeen is best known for being the ancestral home of United States President Ronald Reagan. His great-grandfather, Michael Regan (who later changed the spelling of his name), was baptised in the village in 1829 and lived there until his emigration to London not later than 1851 and ultimately the United States in 1857. Reagan Reagan visited the village on 3 June 1984 and delivered a speech to its residents, during which he discussed his ancestry and what he called the "Irish-American tradition". There was some opposition to Reagan's visit to Ireland, including from the Roman Catholic Church and those opposed to the Reagan administration's foreign policy and support of the Contras in Nicaragua. Authorities kept approximately 600 protesters behind barriers on the outskirts of the village on that day and they were not permitted inside until the presidential party had departed.

Ballyporeen was previously home to The Ronald Reagan Pub. While the building still stands, the pub closed in 2004, the same year as Reagan's death, and the following year its fittings and external signage were transferred to the Ronald Reagan Presidential Library in Simi Valley, California.

Ballyporeen is home to the singer/songwriter Gemma Hayes whose debut album, Night on My Side, was nominated for the 2002 Mercury Music Prize.

== Religion ==
Catholic Church of the Assumption in Ballyporeen

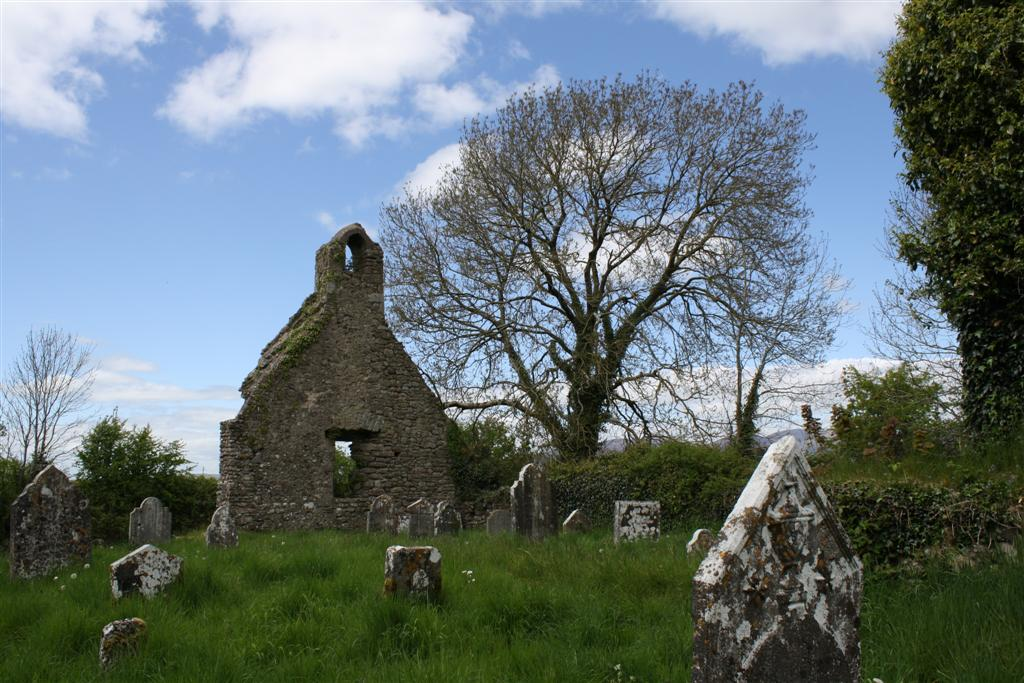
Templetenny graveyard, east of the village, contains the ruins of a church

The Catholic and Anglican parishes were historically known as Templetenny.

The Catholic church in Ballyporeen serves the communities of Ballyporeen and Skeheenarinky in the Roman Catholic Diocese of Waterford and Lismore. The parish church is the Church of the Assumption and was opened in the 19th century.

The local Church of Ireland (Anglican) parish has been amalgamated into the wider Clonmel Union of Parishes. St Matthews Church, a 50-seater church which stood at the top of Main Street, was dismantled c. 1911.

There is an older ruined church at Templetenny approximately 4 km east of the present village of Ballyporeen in Knocknagapple (Cnoc na gCapall) townland. The site itself has Christian monastic origins and dates to at least 750 AD when St. Finnchadh was recorded as being abbot.

== Sport ==
Soccer, Gaelic football, hurling, racquetball and handball are all represented by clubs in the area. The local Gaelic Athletic Association (GAA) club, Ballyporeen GAA, was competing in the Tipperary Senior Football Championship as of the 2026 season. The nearby townland of Skeheenarinky also has a hurling club, Skeheenarinky GAA, which competes at Intermediate level in the Southern division of Tipperary GAA. Ballyporeen has also has a successful record in handball.

== Transport ==
During the week, the area is served five times a day in each direction by Bus Éireann route 245 linking it to Clonmel, Mitchelstown, Fermoy and Cork. During the weekend, there are three buses each way.

== Cultural references ==
Ballyporeen is mentioned in the Counting Crows song "Washington Square" from their album Saturday Nights & Sunday Mornings. It is also mentioned in Christy Moore's song "Hey! Ronnie Reagan" in a reference to Reagan's 1984 visit to Ireland.

== See also ==
- List of towns and villages in Ireland
