= Killoscully =

Village in County Tipperary, Ireland

Coordinates: 52.7687°N 8.3272°W

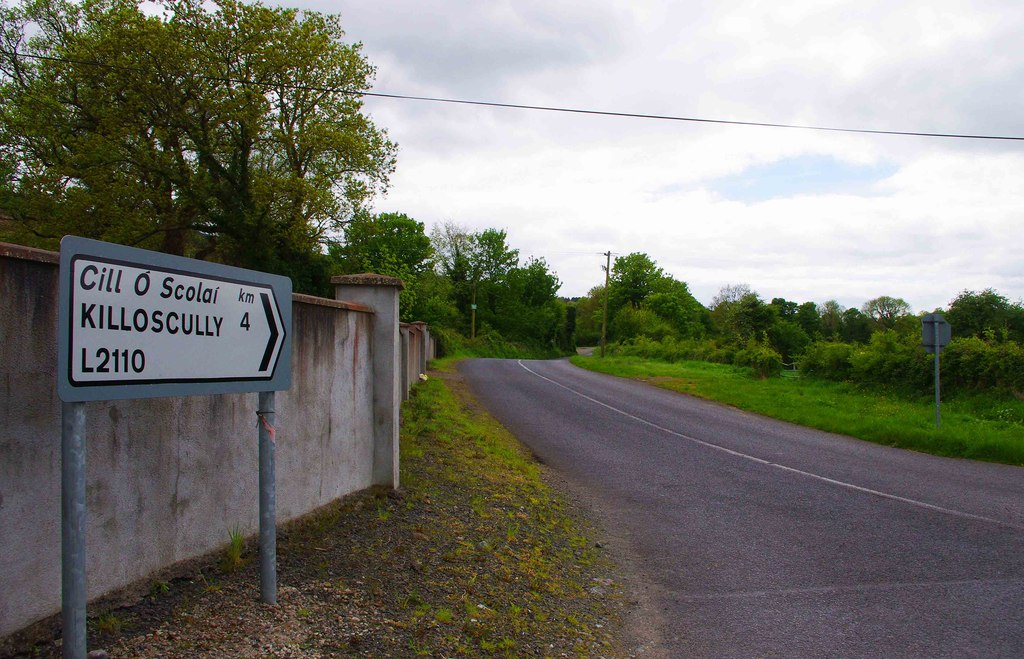
Road signage on the L2110 local road

Killoscully (Irish: Cill Ó Scolaí) is a small village, townland and civil parish in County Tipperary, Ireland. Located approximately 8 kilometres (5 mi) northeast of Newport, overlooked by the Silvermine Mountains, the linear village has a Catholic church, graveyard, community centre and public house. The church, the Church of the Sacred Heart, was built in 1874 and is in the parish of Ballinahinch and Killoscully in the Roman Catholic Archdiocese of Cashel and Emly. The local Gaelic Athletic Association club, Ballinahinch GAA, is also in Ballinahinch and Killoscully parish. Some scenes for the fictional TV show, Killinaskully, were filmed in the area.
