= Shane Fives =

Irish hurler

Personal information
- Native name: Seán de Fibhis (Irish)
- Born: 26 May 1989 (age 37) Tourin, County Waterford, Ireland
- Occupation: Pig farmer
- Height: 6 ft 0 in (183 cm)

Sport
- Sport: Hurling
- Position: Right Corner Back
Clubs
- Years: Club
- Tourin; Carrigtwohill
Club titles
- Waterford titles: 0
College
- Years: College
- Waterford Institute of Technology
College titles
- Fitzgibbon titles: 1
Inter-county
- Years: County
- 2008–present: Waterford
Inter-county titles
- Munster titles: 1
- All-Irelands: 0
- NHL: 1
- All Stars: 0

Shane Fives (born 26 May 1989) is an Irish hurler who currently plays as a right corner-back for the Waterford senior team.

Born in Tourin, County Waterford, Fives developed as a hurler during his secondary schooling at Blackwater Community School in Lismore. He later attended the Waterford Institute of Technology where he won a Fitzgibbon Cup medal in 2008.

At club level, Fives came to prominence in juvenile and underage grades with Tourin, before winning a county junior championship medal in 2009. He also played with the Carrigtwohill club in Cork from 2013 to 2015.

Fives made his debut on the inter-county scene when he was selected for the Waterford minor team in 2006. After two championship seasons with the minor team, he subsequently joined the Waterford under-21 team. By this stage Fives had also joined the Waterford senior team after being added to the panel during the 2008 championship. After a number of years he became a regular member of the starting fifteen, while also being joined by his brother Darragh, and has won one Munster medal as a non-playing substitute and one National Hurling League medal.

As a member of the Munster inter-provincial team, Fives has won one Railway Cup medal.

== Honours ==
Waterford Institute of Technology

- Fitzgibbon Cup (1): 2008

Tourin

- Waterford Junior Hurling Championship (1): 2009

Waterford

- Munster Senior Hurling Championship (1): 2010
- National Hurling League (1): 2015

Munster

- Railway Cup (1): 2016
