= 1959 Waterford Senior Hurling Championship =

Annual hurling competition season

- Champions: Mount Sion (15th title)
- Runners-up: Erin's Own

The 1959 Waterford Senior Hurling Championship was the 59th staging of the Waterford Senior Hurling Championship since its establishment by the Waterford County Board in 1897.

Mount Sion were the defending champions.

On 7 February 1960, Mount Sion won the championship after a 5–05 to 5–04 defeat of Erin's Own in the final. This was their 15th championship title overall and their seventh title in succession.
