= Skeheenarinky =

Skeheenarinky Sceithín na Rince
- Townland
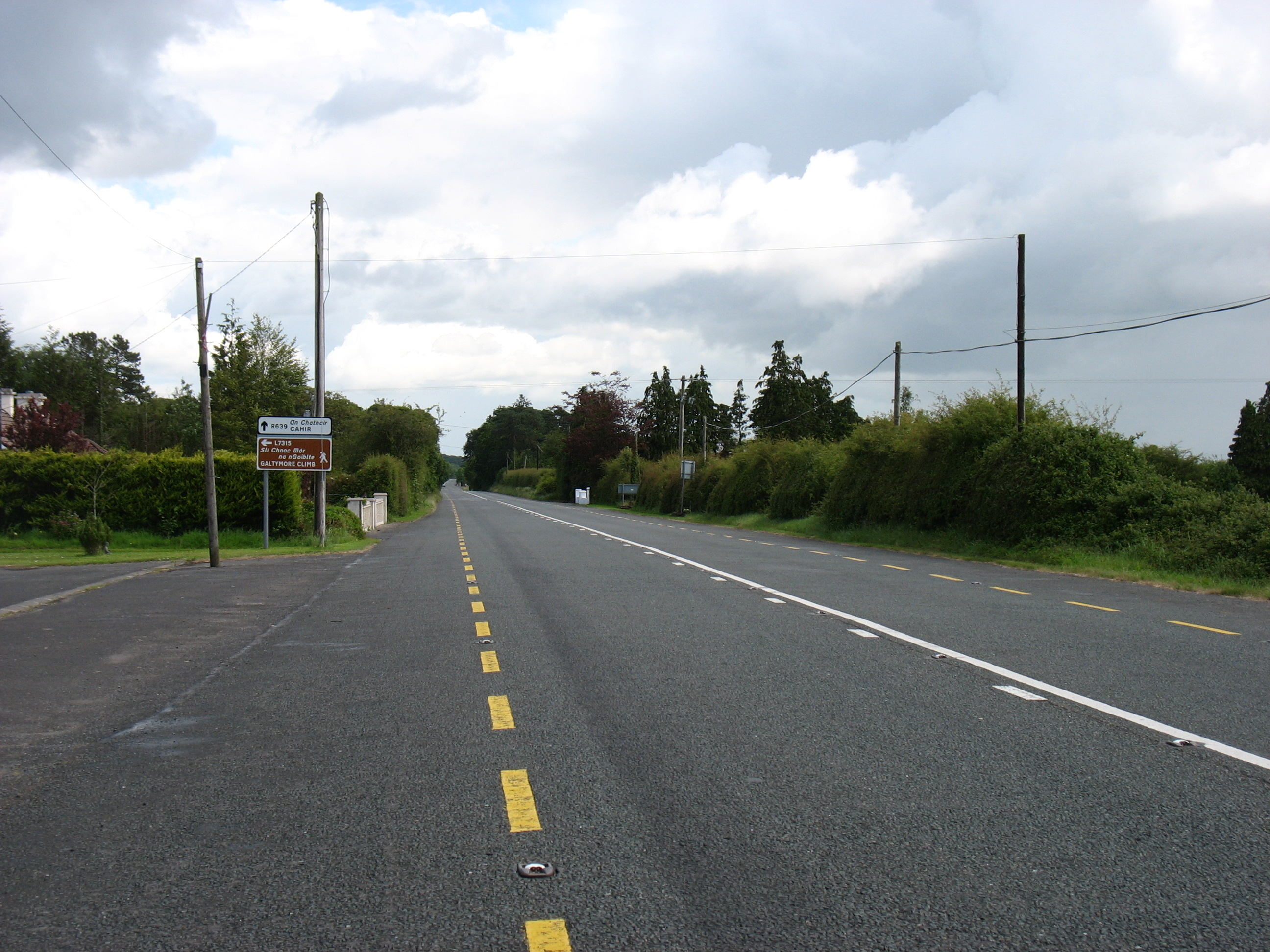
- The R639 passes through Skeheenarinky townland

- Location in Ireland
- Coordinates: 52°18′25″N 8°08′56″W
- Country: Ireland
- Province: Munster
- County: County Tipperary
- Civil parish: Templetenny
- Time zone: UTC+0 (WET)
  - Summer (DST): UTC-1 (IST (WEST))
- Irish grid reference: R899172
- Website: skeheenarinky.com

Skeheenarinky (Irish: Sceichín na Rince, meaning 'the dancing bush') is a townland in south-west County Tipperary, Ireland. It is a dispersed settlement with a focal point at Skeheenarinky Cross where a school is located. As of the 2011 census the townland had a population of 350 people.

== Location ==
The townland of Skeheenarinky (also sometimes known as Skeheenaranky) is situated within the civil parish of Templetenny. It is located between the foothills of the Galtee Mountains and the low-lying farmland to the north of Ballyporeen.

It lies on a stretch of the former main Cork-Dublin road that was superseded by the M8 Motorway in 2008. This road is now designated as the R639 regional road. Mitchelstown and Cahir are approximately 10 km and 20 km respectively.

== History ==
The Mitchelstown Caves are situated approximately 3 km (1.9 mi) from Skeheenarinky Cross and were discovered in 1833 by a labourer quarrying on a small farm. Today the caves are a tourist attraction.

Skeheenarinky was once the location of a large mansion called Galtee Castle, the original structure built for the 2nd Earl of Kingston dated from the late 18th century, it was later remodelled and expanded but was completely demolished c. 1941.

Former Taoiseach, Garret FitzGerald and British model/singer Samantha Fox can trace ancestry to the area.

== Amenities ==
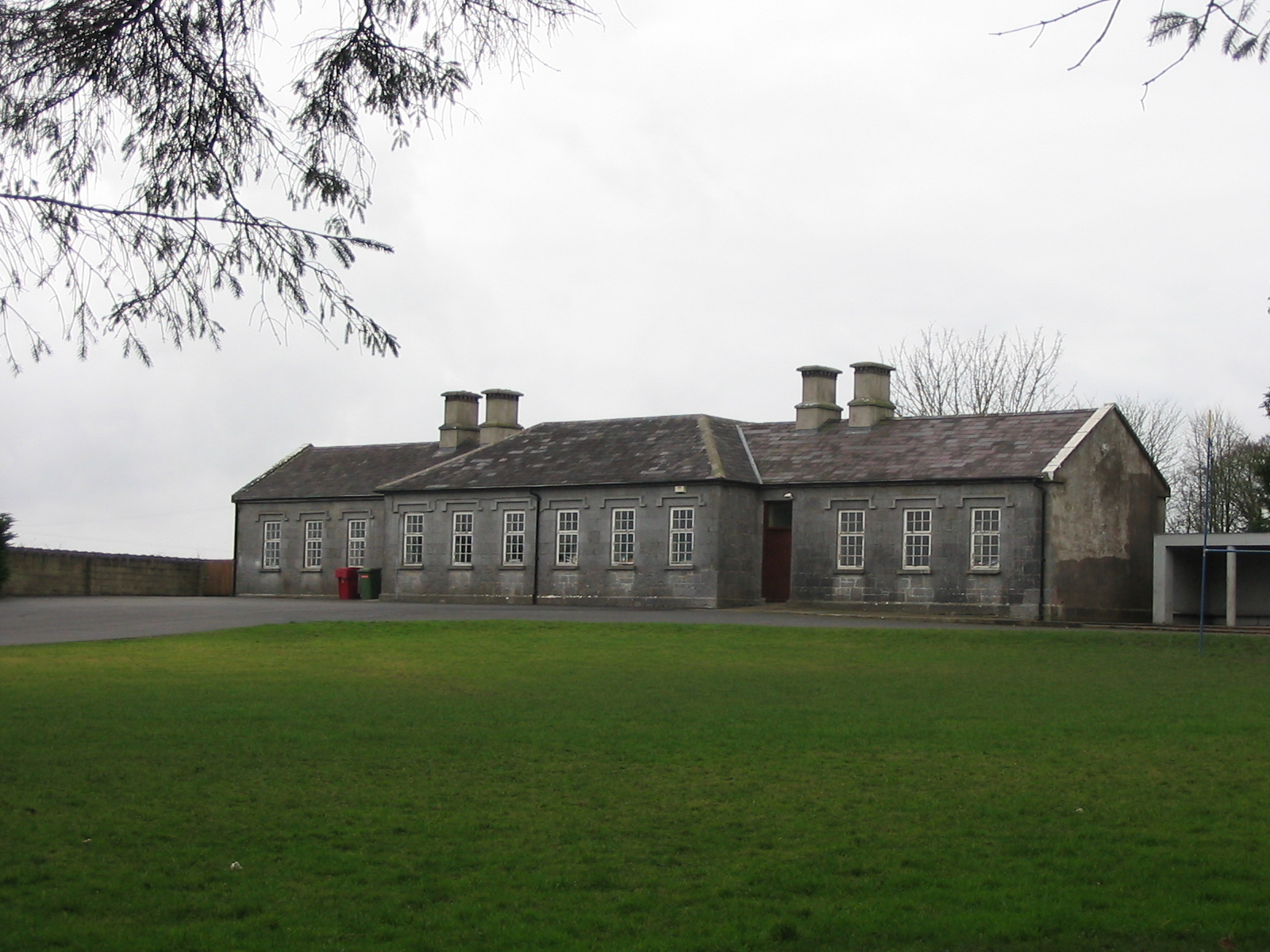
Skeheenarinky National School

Skeheenarinky National School was built in 1858 and celebrated its 150th anniversary in November 2008, a book chronicling its history was produced to mark the occasion. The building itself is notable for its cut limestone construction. Nearby Galty Cottage (c.1858) was built as a home for the teacher. It is known as 'Morrisseys' in recognition of a Mrs. Morrissey who taught at the school and lived there for fifty years. The school's primary catchment area comprises the Coolagaranroe electoral division, which recorded a population of 622 at the 2022 census.

Skeheenarinky GAA, the local Gaelic Athletic Association (GAA) club, won the Tipperary Junior A Hurling Championship in 2021.
