= Clerihan GAA =

Gaelic games club in County Tipperary, Ireland

- Cleireacháin
- Founded: 2005
- County: Tipperary
- Colours: Green and black
- Grounds: Clerihan Community Field

Playing kits
Standard colours

Clerihan GAA is a Gaelic Athletic Association club located in the village of Clerihan, in South County Tipperary, Ireland. The club was formed, in its current form, in 2005. The club competes in fixtures organised by the South Tipperary divisional board and Tipperary county board.

== Honours ==
- South Tipperary Junior Football Championship: (1) 2017
- South Tipperary Junior B Hurling Championship: (1) 2021, 2026
- South Tipperary Minor C Football Championship: (2) 2010, 2011
- South Tipperary Minor C Hurling Championship: (1) 2010
- County League Hurling division 6 Championship: (1) 2026
- County League Football division 4 Championship: (1) 2026
