= 1957 Waterford Senior Hurling Championship =

Annual hurling competition season

- Champions: Mount Sion (13th title)
- Runners-up: Abbeyside

The 1957 Waterford Senior Hurling Championship was the 57th staging of the Waterford Senior Hurling Championship since its establishment by the Waterford County Board in 1897.

Mount Sion were the defending champions.

On 15 December 1957, Mount Sion won the championship after a 2–10 to 1–02 defeat of Abbeyside in the final. This was their 13th championship title overall and their fifth title in succession.
