= Clonmel Óg GAA =

Gaelic Athletic Association gaelic football club

- Founded: 1984
- County: Tipperary
- Colours: Gold and Blue
- Grounds: Ned Hall Park

Playing kits
Standard colours

Clonmel Óg GAA is a Gaelic Athletic Association gaelic football club located outside the town of Clonmel in Ireland. The club is part of the South division of Tipperary GAA and were formed in 1984 to cater for the large urban population outside the town of Clonmel.

== History ==
The club was founded in 1984

== Achievements ==
- Tipperary Premier Junior County Football Championship (1) 2025
- Tipperary Intermediate Football Championship (2) 2008, 2017
- Tipperary Junior B Football Championship (1) 2009
- Tipperary Under-21 B Football Championship (1) 2006
- South Tipperary Junior A Hurling Championship (2) 2023, 2025
- South Tipperary Minor A Hurling Championship (1) 2018 (with Skeheenarinky)
- South Tipperary Intermediate Football Championship (2) 2008, 2017
- South Tipperary Junior Football Championship (2) 1995, 1997
- South Tipperary Junior B Football Championship (2) 2009, 2013
- South Tipperary Junior B Hurling Championship (1) 2000
- South Tipperary Under-21 B Football Championship (3) 2005, 2006, 2012
- South Tipperary Under-21 C Football Championship (1) 2000
- South Tipperary Minor Football Championship (1) 1990
- South Tipperary Minor B Hurling Championship (1) 2016 (with Skeheenarinky)
