= Tipperary Junior A Hurling Championship =

- Irish: Craobh Iomána Shóisear Thiobraid Árainn
- Founded: 1910; 116 years ago
- No. of teams: 8
- Title holders: Fethard GAA (1st title)
- Most titles: Thurles Sarsfields, Holycross–Ballycahill GAA (5 titles)

The Tipperary Junior A Hurling Championship is an annual championship of hurling for male players in the junior grade and is organised by the Tipperary County Board of the Gaelic Athletic Association (GAA). The championship has been awarded almost every year since the first tournament in 1910.

The series of games is played during the autumn months with the final currently being played in November. The championship has always been played on a straight knock-out basis whereby once a team loses they were eliminated from the series.

The Tipperary Junior A Hurling Championship is an integral part of the wider Munster Junior Club Hurling Championship. The winners of the Tipperary county final join the champions of the other five counties to contest the provincial championship.

Eight teams currently participate in the Tipperary Junior A Hurling Championship.

== Teams ==
=== Qualification ===
The Tipperary Junior A Hurling Championship features eight teams in the final tournament. 32 teams contest the four divisional championships with the champions and runners-up automatically qualifying for the county series.

Division	Championship	Qualifying teams
Mid Tipperary	Mid Tipperary Junior A Hurling Championship	Champions and runners-up
North Tipperary	North Tipperary Junior A Hurling Championship	Champions and runners-up
South Tipperary	South Tipperary Junior A Hurling Championship	Champions and runners-up
West Tipperary	West Tipperary Junior A Hurling Championship	Champions and runners-up

=== 2026 teams ===
==== Mid Tipperary ====
Boherlahan–Dualla
Drom & Inch
JK Brackens
Loughmore–Castleiney
Moycarkey–Borris
Thurles Sarsfields
Upperchurch-Drombane

==== North Tipperary ====
Ballinahinch
Borris–Ileigh
Kiladangan
Kilruane MacDonagh's
Nenagh Éire Óg
Roscrea
Silvermines
Toomevara

==== South Tipperary ====
Ballingarry
Ballylooby–Castlegrace
Cahir
Carrick Swans
Clonmel Óg
Father Sheehys
Fethard
Grangemockler
Killenaule
Mullinahone
St Mary's
St Patrick’s

==== West Tipperary ====
Cappawhite
Cashel King Cormacs
Galtee Rovers
Lattin–Cullen
Rockwell Rovers

== Qualification for subsequent competitions ==
The Tipperary Junior A Championship winners qualify for the subsequent Munster Junior Club Hurling Championship.

== Roll of honour ==
=== By club ===
#	Team	Wins	Years won
1	Thurles Sarsfields	5	1955, 1956, 1958, 1987, 1995
1	Holycross-Ballycahill	5	1941, 1974, 1988, 2010, 2025
3	Mid Selection	4	1919, 1923, 1924, 1925
3	Boherlahen-Dualla	4	1916, 1934, 1935, 1936
5	North Selection	3	1926, 1929, 1930
5	South Selection	3	1928, 1931, 1932
5	Kilruane MacDonagh's	3	1969, 1978, 1985
5	Moyne-Templetuohy	3	1961, 1965, 1990
5	Ballinahinch	3	1980, 1994, 2002
5	Drom-Inch	3	1937, 1970, 2005
5	Knockshegowna	3	1969, 1993, 2006
5	Roscrea	3	1982, 1986, 2015
13	Borris-Ileigh	2	1910, 1933
13	Cappawhite	2	1942, 1948
13	Killenaule	2	1927, 1951
13	Solohead	2	1938, 1959
13	Shannon Rovers	2	1939, 1968
13	Burgess	2	1964, 1976
13	Silvermines	2	1972, 1979
13	Borrisokane	2	1940, 1981
13	Ballina	2	1984, 1996
13	Toomevara	2	1913, 1997
13	Nenagh Éire Óg	2	1983, 2000
13	Moyle Rovers	2	1998, 2007
13	Moneygall	2	1949, 2008
13	Moycarkey-Borris	2	1954, 2013
13	Kildangan	2	1971, 2016
13	Skeheenarinky	2	2014, 2021
29	Tipperary O'Learys	1	1922
29	Lorrha	1	1946
29	St. Mary's Nenagh	1	1947
29	Coolmoyne	1	1950
29	13th Battalion	1	1952
29	Newport	1	1957
29	Thurles Kickhams	1	1962
29	Carrick Davins	1	1963
29	Seán Treacy's	1	1966
29	Clonakenny	1	1967
29	Ballingarry	1	1973
29	St. Mary's Clonmel	1	1975
29	Éire Óg Annacarty	1	1977
29	Mullinahone	1	1989
29	Cashel King Cormacs	1	1991
29	Lattin-Cullen	1	1992
29	Galtee Rovers	1	1999
29	Fr. Sheehys	1	2001
29	Thurles Fennellys	1	2003
29	Grangemockler-Ballyneale	1	2004
29	Aherlow	1	2009
29	Rockwell Rovers	1	2011
29	Kilsheelan-Kilcash	1	2012
29	Ballybacon-Grange	1	2017
29	Fethard	1	2026

== See also ==
- Tipperary Senior Hurling Championship (Tier 1)
- Tipperary Premier Intermediate Hurling Championship (Tier 2)
- Tipperary Intermediate Hurling Championship (Tier 3)
