= 1956 Waterford Senior Hurling Championship =

Annual hurling competition season

- Champions: Mount Sion (12th title)
- Runners-up: Affane Cappoquin

The 1956 Waterford Senior Hurling Championship was the 56th staging of the Waterford Senior Hurling Championship since its establishment by the Waterford County Board in 1897.

Mount Sion were the defending champions.

On 15 September 1956, Mount Sion won the championship after a 7–07 to 2–06 defeat of Cappoquin in the final. This was their 12th championship title overall and their fourth title in succession.
