= Newcastle GAA =

Gaelic games club in County Tipperary, Ireland

- Founded: 1932
- County: Tipperary
- Colours: Black and Gold
- Grounds: Newcastle

Playing kits
Standard colours

Newcastle GAA is a Gaelic Athletic Association club located in the village of Newcastle, County Tipperary, Ireland. The club was founded in 1932 and is part of the South division of Tipperary GAA.

== Achievements ==
- South Tipperary Intermediate Football Championship (5) 1977, 1980, 1983, 1986, 1987
- South Tipperary Junior A Football Championship (4) 1975, 2001, 2010, 2012
- South Tipperary Junior A Hurling Championship (7) 1949, 1960, 1971, 1975, 1992, 1995, 2002
- Tipperary Under-21 C Football Championship (2) 2005, 2007
- South Tipperary Under-21 C Football Championship (3) 2004, 2005, 2007
- South Tipperary Under-21 B Hurling Championship (2) 1994, 1999 (with Marlfield)
- South Tipperary Under-21 C Hurling Championship (3) 2005, 2006, 2007
- South Tipperary Minor B Football Championship (2) 1991, 1999
- South Tipperary Minor C Football Championship (1) 1997
- Tipperary Minor B Hurling Championship (1) 1999
- South Tipperary Minor B Hurling Championship (2) 1991, 1999
- South Tipperary Minor C Hurling Championship (2) 2003, 2005
