= Jim Fives =

Irish hurler and Gaelic footballer (1929–2020)

Personal information
- Native name: Séamus de Fibhís (Irish)
- Born: 10 April 1929 Tourin, County Waterford, Ireland
- Died: 17 December 2020 (aged 91) Newcastle Road, Galway, Ireland
- Occupation: Army officer
- Height: 6 ft 0 in (183 cm)

Sport
- Sport: Hurling
- Position: Right corner-back
Clubs
- Years: Club
- Tourin; An Chéad Cath
Club titles
	Football	Hurling
Galway titles	1	0
Inter-county
- Years: County
- 1949–1954 1955–1959: Waterford; Galway
Inter-county titles
- Munster titles: 0
- All-Irelands: 0
- NHL: 0

James Fives (10 April 1929 – 17 December 2020) was an Irish retired hurler and Gaelic footballer. His league and championship career with the Waterford and Galway senior teams lasted ten years from 1949 until 1959. In 1984, Fives was named as captain on a special Hurling Team of the Century made up of players who never won an All-Ireland medal.

== Early life ==
Born in Tourin, County Waterford, Fives was the youngest of five boys. He was educated locally and later attended Lismore CBS where he played competitive hurling for the school. Fives played at underage levels with the Tourin club, before winning a county football championship medal with An Chéad Chath in 1951. He had earlier played at club level with The Curragh before finishing his club career with Castlerea.

== Inter-county career ==
Fives made his debut on the inter-county scene when he was selected for the Waterford minor team, and had one championship season in this grade. Fives later lined out with the junior team before making his senior debut for Waterford in 1949. Over the course of the next few seasons he was a regular member of the starting fifteen. Fives later played for Galway for five seasons, ending his time there in 1959 as a two-time All-Ireland Senior Hurling Championship runner-up. Two year later he was back on the inter-county scene as a member of the Roscommon junior team. Fives won three successive Connacht Junior Hurling Championship medals before retiring from inter-county hurling.

Fives was selected for the Rest of Ireland team on a number of occasions between 1952 and 1959. He also lined out with Connacht, however, he ended his career without a Railway Cup medal.

== Honours ==
An Chéad Cath

- Galway Senior Football Championship (1): 1951

Galway

- Oireachtas Cup (1): 1958

Roscommon

- Connacht Junior Hurling Championship (3): 1961, 1962, 1963
