= Ballinahinch GAA =

Gaelic games club in County Tipperary, Ireland

- Founded: 1886
- Colours: Saffron and Blue
- Grounds: Ballinahinch GAA Park Shallee
- Coordinates: 52°47′26″N 8°18′53″W

Playing kits
Standard colours

Ballinahinch GAA is a Gaelic Athletic Association club based in the parish of Killoscully and Ballinahinch in the north-west of County Tipperary, Ireland. The club plays both Gaelic football and hurling in the North division of Tipperary GAA.

== History ==
The club was founded in 1886, as two separate clubs, Ballinahinch GAA and Killoscully GAA, although there is sources that say Killoscully GAA was in establishment in 1884, the year of the birth of the GAA.

== Gaelic football ==
Although from the beginning the Ballinahinch club was primarily involved in football, hurling is the main sport played in the club, given that the North division is dominated by hurling.

=== Honours ===
- North Tipperary Senior Football Championship (1)
  - (as Mulcair Rovers) 1982
- North Tipperary Intermediate Football Championship (1)
  - 2010
- North Tipperary Junior A Football Championship (2)
  - 1980, 2007
- Tipperary Junior 'B' Football Championship (1)
  - 2002
- North Tipperary Junior B Football Championship (4)
  - 1995, 1998, 2001, 2002
- Tipperary Under-21 B Football Championship (2)
  - 2001, 2013 (as Ballinahinch Gaels)
- North Tipperary Under-21 B Football Championship (2)
  - 2001, 2013 (as Ballinahinch Gaels)
- Tipperary Under-21 C Football Championship (2)
  - 2000, 2009
- North Tipperary Under-21 C Football Championship (2)
  - 2000, 2006
- North Tipperary Minor B Football Championship (2)
  - 1994 (with Burgess), 2002
- Tipperary Minor C Football Championship (3)
  - 2000, 2004, 2010
- North Tipperary Minor C Football Championship (1)
  - 2000

== Hurling ==
In 1980 the club won its first County Junior Hurling title. It has also won many North division titles at Junior, U-21 and Minor levels.

=== Honours ===
- North Tipperary Intermediate Hurling Championship (2)
  - 2016, 2017
- Tipperary Intermediate Hurling League (3)
  - 2005, 2015, 2016
- Tipperary Junior 'A' Hurling Championship (3)
  - 1980, 1994, 2002
- North Tipperary Junior A Hurling Championship (7)
  - 1971, 1980, 1992, 1994, 2001, 2002, 2023
- North Tipperary Junior C Hurling Championship (1)
  - 2012
- North Tipperary Under-21 B Hurling Championship (2)
  - 2002, 2016 (with Templederry)
- Tipperary Under-21 C Hurling Championship (3)
  - 2000, 2006, 2011
- North Tipperary Under-21 C Hurling Championship (2)
  - 2000, 2010
- North Tipperary Minor B Hurling Championship (1)
  - 1987 (with Ballina)
- Tipperary Minor C Hurling Championship (1)
  - 2007

=== Notable players ===
- Shane McGrath
- Michael Ryan
