= 1949 Waterford Senior Hurling Championship =

Annual hurling competition season

- Champions: Mount Sion (7th title)
- Runners-up: Clonea

The 1949 Waterford Senior Hurling Championship was the 49th staging of the Waterford Senior Hurling Championship since its establishment by the Waterford County Board in 1897.

Mount Sion were the defending champions.

On 16 October 1949, Mount Sion won the championship after a 4–08 to 0–06 defeat of Clonea in the final. This was their 7th championship title overall and their second title in succession.
