= Ballylooby–Castlegrace GAA =

Gaelic games club in County Tipperary, Ireland

- Béal Átha Lúbaigh–Caisleán an Ghrásaigh
- Founded: 1934
- County: Tipperary
- Colours: Blue and Yellow
- Grounds: Kilroe, Ballylooby
- Coordinates: 52.315106°N 8.001591°W

Playing kits
Standard colours

Ballylooby–Castlegrace GAA is a Gaelic Athletic Association club located in the village areas of Ballylooby and Castlegrace, in County Tipperary, Ireland. It fields Gaelic football and hurling teams in the South division of Tipperary GAA. The pitch is located 1.3 km outside Ballylooby.

== Hurling ==
Ballylooby GAA club was formed in 1941, after a change in GAA rules meant that Ballylooby hurlers were no longer eligible to play with the neighbouring parish's team, the Rehill Unknowns (formed in 1934). Ballylooby won the South Tipperary Junior Hurling Championship in 1945. After of long period of decline, the club again won the Junior championship in 1972. The present club name was adopted in the mid-1970s. In 1999, the team entered and won the South "B" Junior Hurling Championship, and in 2003 it secured the South Junior Hurling Championship.

=== Honours ===
- South Tipperary Junior Hurling Championship (5)
  - 1945, 1972 (as Ballylooby); 2003, 2009, 2013
- South Tipperary "B" Junior Hurling Championship (1)
  - 1999
- South Tipperary Minor B Hurling Championship (1)
  - 2009 (as Knockmealdown Gaels)
- Tipperary Minor C Hurling Championship (1)
  - 2011
- South Tipperary Minor C Hurling Championship (2)
  - 2000, 2011

== Gaelic football ==
In 1974 Ballylooby entered the South Tipperary Intermediate Football Championship for the first time, and won it. The club regained that title in 1976 and lost the county IFC final by one point. In the mid-1980s the football team was regraded to Junior. In 2002, the club won the South Junior Football Championship.

=== Honours ===
- South Tipperary Intermediate Football Championship (2)
  - 1974 , 1976
- South Tipperary Junior Football Championship (3)
  - 2002 , 2011 , 2026
- South Tipperary Minor A Football Championship (1)
  - 1980 (as Ballylooby and Fr. Sheehy's)
- Tipperary Minor C Football Championship (1)
  - 2011
- South Tipperary Minor C Football Championship (2)
  - 2000 , 2007
