= Fr. Sheehys GAA =

Gaelic games club in County Tipperary, Ireland

- Founded: 1930s
- County: Tipperary
- Colours: Blue and Gold
- Grounds: Father Sheehy Park

Playing kits
Standard colours

Fr. Sheehys GAA is a Gaelic Athletic Association gaelic football and Hurling club located in Clogheen in South Tipperary in Ireland. The club is part of the South division of Tipperary GAA and represents the areas of Clogheen and Burncourt. In 1972 the club were renamed Fr. Sheehy's, combining Burncourt Football Club and Clogheen Hurling Club which were both formed in the 1930s. The club is named after Nicholas Sheehy who was a Parish priest in the Clogheen and Burncourt area at the time of his death in 1766.

== Achievements ==
- Tipperary Intermediate Football Championship (1) 1984
- South Tipperary Intermediate Football Championship (5) 1978, 1981, 1984, 2001, 2018
- Tipperary Junior A Hurling Championship (1) 2001
- South Tipperary Junior Hurling Championship (1) 2001
- South Tipperary Under-21 B Football Championship (1) 2002
- South Tipperary Under-21 B Hurling Championship (1) 1995, 1998
- Tipperary Under-21 C Hurling Championship (1) 2012
- South Tipperary Under-21 C Hurling Championship (2) 2002, 2011
- South Tipperary Minor A Football Championship (1) 1980 (with Ballylooby)
- South Tipperary Minor B Football Championship (1) 1993
- South Tipperary Minor C Football Championship (1) 2004
- South Tipperary Minor B Hurling Championship (1) 1993
