= St Patrick's GAA (Tipperary) =

Gaelic games club in County Tipperary, Ireland

St Patrick's
- Naomh Pádraig
- Founded: 1944
- County: Tipperary
- Nickname: Pats
- Colours: Black and amber
- Grounds: Anner Park Cloneen
- Coordinates: 52.4750075, -7.5963656

Playing kits
Standard colours

Senior Club Championships
	All Ireland	Munster champions	Tipperary champions
Football:	0	0	2
Hurling:	0	0	0

St Patrick's GAA is a Gaelic Athletic Association club in the parish of Drangan and Cloneen in County Tipperary, Ireland. The club are part of the South Tipperary GAA division.

== Achievements ==
- Munster Junior Club Hurling Championship Runners-Up 2010
- Tipperary Senior Football Championship Winners 1908(As Cloneen), 1947, 1953
- South Tipperary Senior Football Championship Winners 1947, 1953, 1990 (with Grangemockler)
- South Tipperary Intermediate Football Championship Winners 1995
- Tipperary Junior A Football Championship Winners 1967, 1991, 2023, 2024
- South Tipperary Junior B Hurling Championship Winners 1998, 2005
- South Tipperary Junior A Hurling Championship Winners 1991, 2005, 2010, 2014, 2015, 2026
- South Tipperary Under-21 Football Championship Winners 1970 (with Mullinahone as Slievenamon)
- South Tipperary Under-21 B Football Championship Winners 2024
- Tipperary Under-21 C Football Championship Winners 2012
- South Tipperary Under-21 C Football Championship Winners 2003, 2012
- South Tipperary Under-21 B Hurling Championship Winners 1991, 2004, 2009
- South Tipperary Under-21 C Hurling Championship Winners 2001
- South Tipperary Under-19 B Hurling Championship Winners 2022, 2023
- South Tipperary Under-19 B Football Championship Winners 2025
- Tipperary Minor Football Championship Winners 1970 (with Mullinahone as Slievenamon)
- South Tipperary Minor Football Championship Winners 1970 (with Mullinahone as Slievenamon)
- South Tipperary Minor B Football Championship Winners 2005 (as St. Patrick's Gaels)
- Tipperary Minor C Football Championship Winners 2001
- South Tipperary Minor C Football Championship Winners 2001
- South Tipperary Minor B Hurling Championship Winners 2003
- South Tipperary Minor C Hurling Championship Winners 1999, 2002
