= Pádraig Fitzgerald =

Irish hurler

Personal information
- Native name: Pádraig Mac Giolla Pádraig (Irish)
- Born: 2002 (age 23–24) Lemybrien; County Waterford, Ireland

Sport
- Sport: Hurling
- Position: Left corner-forward
Club
- Years: Club
- 2020-present: Kilrossanty
Club titles
	Football	Hurling
Waterford titles	0	0
College
- Years: College
- SETU Waterford
College titles
- Fitzgibbon titles: 0
Inter-county
- Years: County
- 2023-present: Waterford
Inter-county titles
- Munster titles: 0
- All-Irelands: 0
- NHL: 0
- All Stars: 0

Pádraig Fitzgerald (born 2002) is an Irish hurler and Gaelic footballer. At club level he plays with Kilrossanty and at inter-county level with the Waterford senior hurling team.

== Career ==
Fitzgerald first played hurling at juvenile and underage levels with the Kilrossanty club. He won a Waterford U20BHC title in 2022 after scoring 0–13 in the defeat of Clonea. By this stage he had also joined the club's top adult teams as a dual player. Fitzgerald has also lined out for SETU Waterford in the Fitzgibbon Cup.

Fitzgerald first appeared on the inter-county scene with Waterford as a dual player with the under-20 teams in 2021 and 2022. Fitzgerald joined the Waterford senior hurling team in advance of the 2023 season.

== Honours ==
Kilrossanty

- Waterford Junior A Hurling Championship: 2024
- Waterford Under-20 B Hurling Championship: 2022
