= Tourin–Ballinwillin GAA =

Gaelic games club in County Waterford, Ireland

Tourin
- Tourín
- County: Waterford
- Colours: Red and White
- Coordinates: 52°07′42.66″N 7°52′09.04″W

Playing kits
Standard colours

Senior Club Championships
	All Ireland	Munster champions	Waterford champions
Hurling:	-	-	1

Tourin–Ballinwillin GAA Club is a Gaelic Athletic Association club located in County Waterford, Ireland between Cappoquin and Lismore. It has one Waterford Senior Hurling Championship title which was won in 1950. The club colours are red and white vertical stripes. The club goes by the name of 'Tourin' for hurling and 'Ballinwillin' for Gaelic Football.

== History ==
In 2009, Tourin joined forces with another local club, Mount Melleray GAA. The new (amalgamated) club takes part in the Junior Premier section in the Waterford Hurling and Football Championships. On 10 October 2009, Tourin won the Western Junior hurling final, beating Ballinameela GAA by 2-18 to 2-14 at Fraher Field. Two weeks later, Tourin Glen Rovers added the Waterford Junior Hurling Championship title, defeating Kill by 3 points. They were proposed to the Waterford Intermediate Hurling Championship for the 2010 season.

== Notable players ==
- Shane Fives
- Jim Fives
- Darragh Fives

== Honours ==
- Waterford Senior Hurling Championships (1): 1950
- Waterford Junior Hurling Championships (4): 1941, 1949, 1977, 2009
- Waterford Junior Football Championships: (3): 1912, 1952, 1971
