= Newcastle, County Tipperary =

Newcastle Irish: An Caisleán Nua
- Village
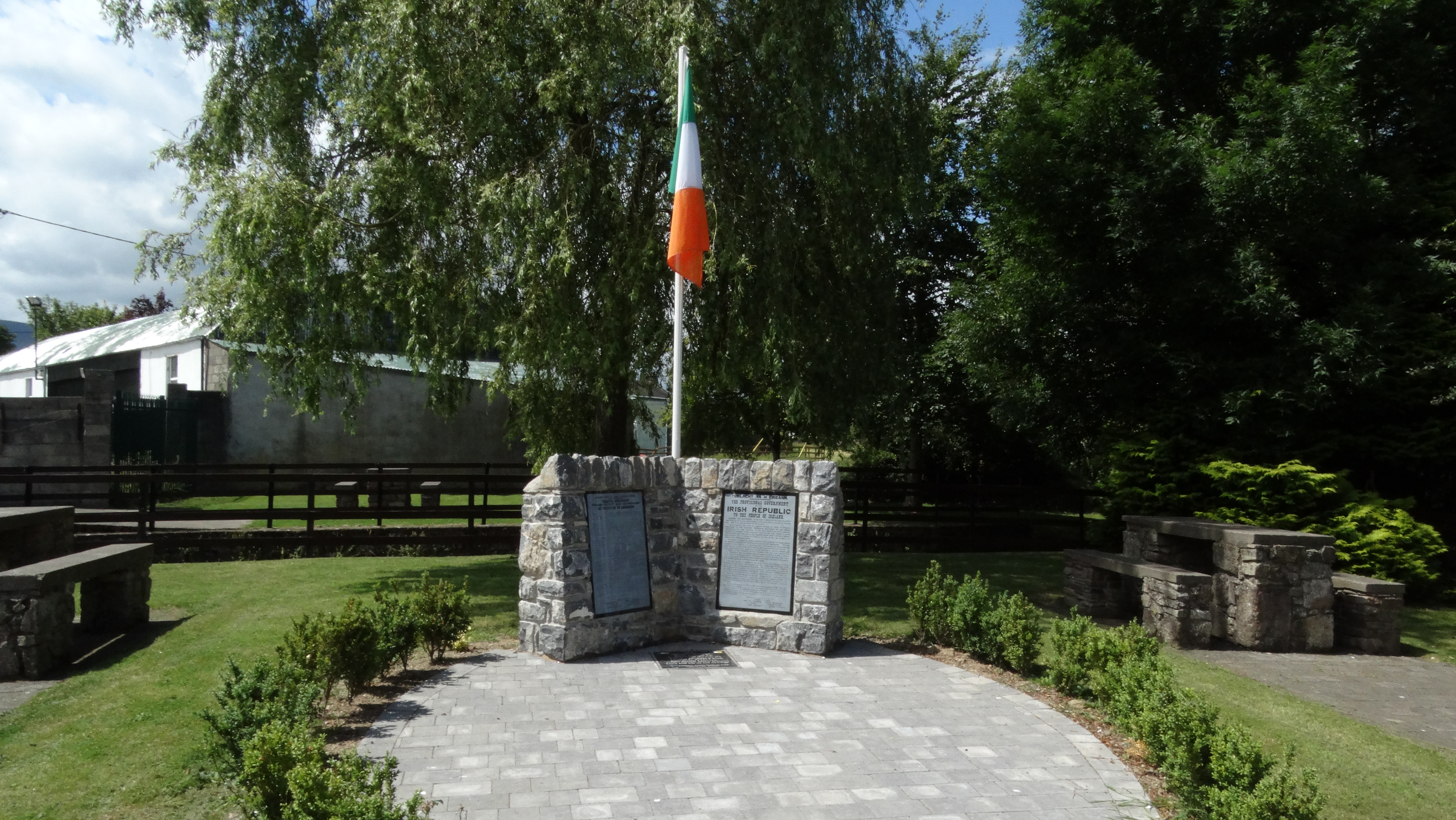
- Commemorative plaque and flagpole in Newcastle

- Location in Ireland
- Coordinates: 52°16′19″N 7°48′40″W
- Country: Ireland
- Province: Munster
- County: Tipperary
- Elevation: 31 m (102 ft)

Population (2022)
  - Total: 351
- Time zone: UTC+0 (WET)
  - Summer (DST): UTC-1 (IST (WEST))
- Irish Grid Reference: S129134

Newcastle (Irish: An Caisleán Nua) is a village in County Tipperary, Ireland. Located close to the border with County Waterford, it is in a civil parish of the same name, in the barony of Iffa and Offa West. The River Suir runs past the village. Newcastle is located 17 km (11 mi) from Clonmel, the county town of County Tipperary.

The remains of an Anglo-Norman castle (tower house) and medieval church are located near the village. The castle is traditionally associated with the Prendergast family, who descended from Maurice de Prendergast of nearby Ardfinnan Castle.

Newcastle was formerly known as Eskertenan, followed by the Manor of Newcastle de Eskertenan, or simply Newcastle Prendergast.

Newcastle is the birthplace of Rev. Dr. Robert MacCarthy, Dean of St. Patrick's Cathedral, Dublin (1999-2012). Politician Mattie McGrath is also from the area.
