= Skeheenarinky GAA =

Gaelic games club in County Tipperary, Ireland

- County: Tipperary
- Colours: Tangerine and Blue

Playing kits
Standard colours

Skeheenarinky GAA is a Gaelic Athletic Association club in County Tipperary, Ireland. The club, based in the townland of Skeheenarinky in the parish of Ballyporeen, is part of the South division of Tipperary GAA. The club fields hurling teams at various age levels and, in under-age football, collaborates with the neighbouring Ballyporeen GAA.

== Honours ==
- South Tipperary Intermediate Hurling Championship (1): 2026
- Tipperary Junior A Hurling Championship (2): 2014, 2021
- South Tipperary Junior A Hurling Championship (10): 1981, 1990, 1994, 1996, 1999, 2000, 2017, 2018, 2019, 2021
- South Tipperary Minor A Hurling Championship (1): 2018 (Skeheenarinky/Clonmel Og)
- South Tipperary Minor B Hurling Championship (3): 1986 (Brian Borus), 2011, 2015 (Skeheenarinky/Clonmel Og)
- Tipperary Minor Hurling C Championship (1): 2004
- Tipperary Juvenile Hurling Championship (1): 2014
