= Modeligo GAA =

Gaelic games club in Ireland

Modeligo
- Founded: 1977
- County: Waterford
- Colours: Green and White

Playing kits
Standard colours

Modeligo GAA is a Gaelic Athletic Association club in County Waterford in the Republic of Ireland. Modeligo's most notable successes are winning the Waterford County Junior Football Championship in 1996 defeating St Mollerans & the County Junior Hurling Championship in 2008 defeating Fenor. In 2014, the club won its second county Junior Hurling title and also won the Munster title with a victory over Cork champions Castlemartyr, on a scoreline of 5–12 to 0–14 at Mallow. The club colours are Green & White.

== Honours ==
- Munster Junior Club Hurling Championship Winners 2014
- Waterford Junior Football Championship Winners (2) 1996, 2015
- West Waterford Junior Football Championship Winners (6) 1986, 1990, 1992, 1996, 2007, 2015
- West Waterford Intermediate Football Championship Winners (2) 2018, 2019
- Waterford Junior Hurling Championship Winners 2008, 2014
- West Waterford Junior Hurling Championship Winners (2) 2008, 2014
- West Waterford Junior 'B' Hurling Championship Winners (3) 1986, 1991, 1998
- West Waterford Intermediate Hurling League Winners (2) 2014, 2015
- West Waterford Intermediate Hurling Championship Winners (1) 2015
