= Ballinameela GAA =

Ballinameela
- Baile na Miolach
- Founded: 1957
- County: Waterford
- Colours: Blue and white
- Grounds: Cappagh

Playing kits
Standard colours

Ballinameela GAA is a Gaelic Athletic Association club in Cappagh, County Waterford, Ireland. The club fields teams in both hurling and Gaelic football.

== History ==
Located in Cappagh between Dungarvan and Lismore, the current Ballinamere GAA Club was founded in 1957, however, Gaelic games had been played in the area for several decades at that stage, with a Ballinameela/Aglish combination winning the Waterford SFC title in 1889. The club spent much of its early years operating in the West Waterford divisional championships before winning the Waterford IFC title for the first time in 1979. Ballinameela reached the Waterford SFC final in 1984 but lost out to Tramore. A first Waterford JAHC was won a year later in 1985.

The turn of the 21st century saw Ballinameela have several successes across both codes. Three more Waterford IFC titles were won between 2009 and 2015. The club also claimed further Waterford JAHC honours in 2011 and 2018. Ballinameela later lost out to Cloughduv in the 2018 Munster junior club final.

== Honours ==
- Waterford Intermediate Football Championship (4): 1979, 2009, 2012, 2015
- Waterford Junior A Hurling Championship (3): 1985, 2011, 2018
