= Eoin Murphy (Kilkenny hurler) =

Irish hurler (born 1990)

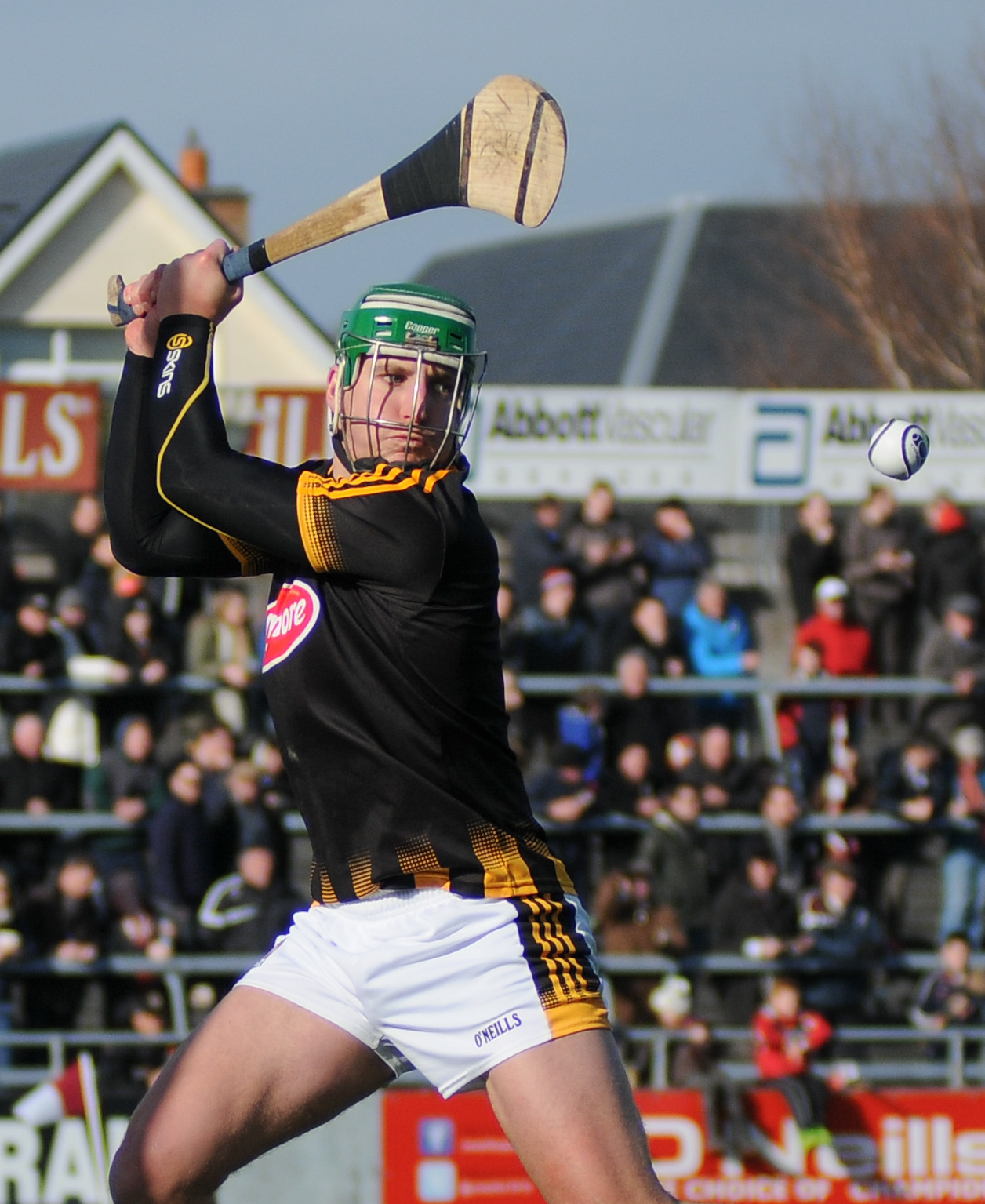
- Murphy in 2015

Personal information
- Native name: Eoghan Ó Murchú (Irish)
- Born: 6 August 1990 (age 36) Waterford, Ireland
- Height: 1.8 m (5 ft 11 in)

Sport
- Sport: Hurling
- Position: Goalkeeper
Club
- Years: Club
- 2007–present: Glenmore
Club titles
	Football	Hurling
Kilkenny titles	1	0
College
- Years: College
- 2010-2014: Waterford IT
College titles
- Fitzgibbon titles: 1
Inter-county*
Years	County	Apps (scores)
2011–2026	Kilkenny	70 (0-13)
Inter-county titles
- Leinster titles: 10
- All-Irelands: 4
- NHL: 5
- All Stars: 4
- *Inter County team apps and scores correct as of 16:00, 6 July 2025.

Eoin Murphy (born 6 August 1990) is an Irish hurler who plays for Kilkenny Senior Championship club Glenmore, and previously at inter-county level with the Kilkenny senior hurling team. He usually lines out as a goalkeeper.

== Playing career ==
=== New Ross Vocational College ===
Murphy first came to prominence as a Gaelic footballer at New Ross Vocational College. It was during his time here that he was selected for the Wexford vocational schools' team. Murphy won back-to-back All-Ireland B Championship medals in 2008 and 2009.

=== Waterford Institute of Technology ===
Murphy studied at the Waterford Institute of Technology and joined the senior hurling team in his second year at the institute. On 1 March 2014, he captained the team from centre-back when Waterford IT defeated the Cork Institute of Technology by 0–17 to 0–12 to win the Fitzgibbon Cup.

=== Glenmore ===
Murphy joined the Glenmore club at a young age and played in all grades at juvenile and underage levels as a dual player before eventually joining the club's top adult teams in both hurling and Gaelic football.

On 10 October 2009, Murphy lined out at left wing-back when Glenmore faced Muckalee in the Kilkenny Football Championship final. He ended the game with a winners' medal following the 2–7 to 0–10 victory.

On 25 October 2015, Murphy won a Kilkenny Junior Championship medal as part of the Glenmore hurling team that defeated Kilmacow by 1–12 to 2–06 in the final. He was one of the club's top scorers throughout the championship after amassing 6-28. On 16 January 2016, Murphy lined out at right wing-forward when Glenmore faced Lusmagh in the Leinster final. He top scored with 0-08, including four frees, and ended the game with a winners' medal following the 0–23 to 0–13 defeat of Lusmagh. Murphy was switched to centre-forward for the All-Ireland final against Eoghan Rua on 7 February 2016. He scored a point from play and collected an All-Ireland medal following the 2–08 to 0–12 victory.

Murphy lined out at centre-back with Glenmore team, won the 2021 Kilkenny Intermediate Hurling Championship. Gaining promotion back to the Kilkenny Senior Hurling Championship.

=== Kilkenny ===
==== Minor and under-21 ====
Murphy first played for Kilkenny as a member of the minor team during the 2008 Leinster Championship. He made his first appearance for the team on 6 April 2008 when he lined out in goal in Kilkenny's 3–12 to 0–15 defeat of Wexford. On 6 July 2008, Murphy was again in goal when he collected a Leinster Championship medal following a 1–19 to 0–12 defeat of Wexford in the final. On 7 September 2008, Kilkenny faced Galway in the All-Ireland final. Although held scoreless for much of the second half, Murphy collected a winners' medal following the 3–06 to 0–13 victory.

Murphy was drafted onto the Kilkenny under-21 team as sub-goalkeeper in advance of the Leinster Championship. He won a Leinster Under-21 Hurling Championship medal as an unused substitute on 15 July 2009 following Kilkenny's 2–20 to 1–09 defeat of Dublin in the final. Murphy was again an unused substitute on 13 September 2009 when Kilkenny suffered a 0–15 to 0–14 defeat by Clare in the All-Ireland final.

On 9 June 2010, Murphy made his first appearance for the Kilkenny under-21 team. He scored three points from right corner-forward following Kilkenny's 2–31 to 0–08 defeat of Offaly.

Murphy was eligible for the under-21 grade for a third and final season in 2011. He made his final appearance in the grade on 7 June 2011 and top scored with 0–05 in the 1–16 to 2–12 defeat by Wexford.

==== Intermediate ====
Murphy was added to the Kilkenny intermediate hurling team in advance of the 2010 Leinster Championship. He won a Leinster Championship medal as an unused substitute on 7 July 2010 following a 1–21 to 0–11 defeat of Dublin in the final. On 28 August 2010, Murphy was again an unused substitute when Kilkenny defeated Cork by 2–17 to 1–13 in the All-Ireland final.

On 6 July 2011, Murphy made his Kilkenny intermediate team debut. He won a second successive Leinster Championship medal on that occasion after top scoring with 1–07 in a 2–15 to 2–13 defeat of Wexford in the final.

==== Senior ====
Murphy was added to the Kilkenny senior team as third-choice goalkeeper for the 2011 season. On 3 July 2011, he won a Leinster Championship medal as a member of the extended panel following Kilkenny's 4–17 to 1–15 defeat of Dublin in the final. Murphy again failed to make the match-day panel but was on the extended panel when Kilkenny faced Tipperary in the All-Ireland final on 4 September 2011. He ended the game with an All-Ireland medal following the 2–17 to 1–16 victory.

Murphy was promoted to second-choice goalkeeper behind David Herity during the 2012 National League. He made his first appearance on 11 March 2012 when he lined out in goal in a 2–21 to 1–15 defeat of Waterford. On 6 May 2012, Murphy won a National League medal as an unused substitute following Kilkenny's 3–21 to 0–16 defeat of Cork in the final. He was retained as second-choice goalkeeper for the Leinster Championship and was an unused substitute on 8 July 2012 when Kilkenny suffered a 2–21 to 2–11 defeat by Galway in the final. On 9 September 2012, Murphy was amongst the substitutes when Kilkenny drew 2–13 to 0–19 with Galway in the All-Ireland final. On 30 September 2012, he won his second All-Ireland medal as an unused substitute following Kilkenny's 3–22 to 3–11 defeat of Galway in the All-Ireland final replay.

On 5 May 2013, Murphy lined out in goal when Kilkenny faced Tipperary in the National League final. He ended the game with a second successive winners' medal - his first on the field of play - following the 2–17 to 0–20 victory. Murphy made his Leinster Championship debut on 9 June 2013 when he lined out in goal in Kilkenny's 0–26 to 4–09 defeat of Offaly.

On 4 May 2014, Murphy was selected in goal when Kilkenny faced Tipperary in a second successive National League final. He ended the game with a third successive winners' medal following the 2–25 to 1–27 victory. Murphy lined out in Kilkenny's opening three games in the subsequent Leinster Championship but returned to the substitutes' bench for the Leinster final against Dublin on 6 July 2014. He ended the game with a second winners' medal as an unused substitute following the 0–24 to 1–09 victory. On 7 September 2014, Murphy was restored to the goalkeeping position when Kilkenny drew 3–22 to 1–28 with Tipperary in the All-Ireland final. He was again in goal for the replay on 27 September 2014 and ended the game with a third All-Ireland medal - his first on the field of play - following the 2–17 to 2–14 victory. Murphy ended the season by receiving an All-Star nomination.

Murphy won his third Leinster Championship medal - his first on the field of play - on 5 July 2015 following Kilkenny's 1–25 to 2–15 defeat of Galway in the Leinster final. On 6 September 2015, he was again in goal for the All-Ireland final against Galway. Murphy ended the game with a fourth All-Ireland medal following the 1–22 to 1–18 victory. He ended the season by being nominated for a second All-Star award.

Murphy won a fourth Leinster Championship medal on 3 July 2016 following a 1–26 to 0–22 defeat of Galway in the final. He was again in goal for the All-Ireland final against Tipperary on 4 September 2016. Murphy ended the game on the losing side following a 2–29 to 2–20 defeat. He ended the season by being named in the goalkeeping position on the All-Star team.

On 8 April 2018, Murphy was in goal when Kilkenny faced Tipperary in the National League final. He scored a point from a free and collected a fourth winners' medal following the 2–23 to 2–17 victory. Murphy was again selected in goal when Kilkenny faced Galway in the Leinster final on 1 July 2018. He scored a point from a free in the 0-18 apiece draw. He retained his position for the replay a week later, however, Kilkenny suffered a 1–28 to 3–15 defeat. Murphy was later named in the goalkeeping position on the All-Star team.

Murphy missed the opening rounds of the Leinster Championship in 2019 but was back in goal for the final on 30 June 2019. He scored a point from a long-range free in the 1–23 to 0–23 defeat by Wexford. Murphy again lined out in goal when Kilkenny suffered a 3–25 to 0–20 defeat by Tipperary in the 2019 All-Ireland final. He ended the season by being nominated for an All-Star award.

On 14 November 2020, Murphy won his fifth Leinster Championship medal after keeping a clean sheet in goal in the 2–20 to 0–24 defeat of Galway in the final.

In October 2026, Murphy announced his retirement from inter-county hurling after 16 years.

=== Leinster ===
Murphy was added to the Leinster inter-provincial team during the 2016 Inter-provincial Championship. He made his only appearance for the team on 15 December 2016 when he came on as a half-time substitute for Gerry Keegan in a 2–20 to 2–16 defeat by Munster in the final.

== Career statistics ==
As of match played 6 July 2025.

Team	Year	National League			Leinster		All-Ireland		Total	
Team	Year	Division	Apps	Score	Apps	Score	Apps	Score	Apps	Score
Kilkenny	2011	Division 1A	0	0-00	0	0-00	0	0-00	0	0-00
Kilkenny	2012	Division 1A	2	0-00	0	0-00	0	0-00	2	0-00
Kilkenny	2013	Division 1A	6	0-00	3	0-00	3	0-00	12	0-00
Kilkenny	2014	Division 1A	5	0-00	3	0-00	2	0-00	10	0-00
Kilkenny	2015	Division 1A	6	0-00	2	0-00	2	0-00	10	0-00
Kilkenny	2016	Division 1A	4	0-00	2	0-00	3	0-00	9	0-00
Kilkenny	2017	Division 1A	6	0-04	1	0-00	2	0-01	9	0-05
Kilkenny	2018	Division 1A	5	0-06	6	0-07	1	0-00	12	0-13
Kilkenny	2019	Division 1A	6	0-05	2	0-01	3	0-01	11	0-07
Kilkenny	2020	Division 1B	2	0-01	2	0-00	1	0-00	5	0-01
Kilkenny	2021	Division 1B	4	0-00	2	0-01	1	0-00	7	0-01
Kilkenny	2022	Division 1B	5	0-01	6	0-00	2	0-00	0-01	
Kilkenny	2023	Division 1B	4	0-01	6	0-01	2	0-01	12	0-03
Kilkenny	2024	Division 1B	6	0-00	5	0-00	1	0-00	12	0-00
Kilkenny	2025	Division 1B	2	0-00	6	0-00	1	0-00	9	0-00
Total			63	0-18	46	0-10	24	0-03	133	0-28

== Honours ==
=== Player ===
Wexford Vocational Schools Team

- All-Ireland Senior B Vocational Schools Football Championship: 2008, 2009

Waterford Institute of Technology

- Fitzgibbon Cup: 2014 (c)

Glenmore

- Kilkenny Senior Football Championship: 2009
- Kilkenny Intermediate Hurling Championship: 2021
- All-Ireland Junior Club Hurling Championship: 2016
- Leinster Junior Club Hurling Championship: 2016
- Kilkenny Junior Hurling Championship: 2015

Kilkenny

- All-Ireland Senior Hurling Championship: 2011, 2012, 2014, 2015
- Leinster Senior Hurling Championship: 2011, 2014, 2015, 2016, 2020, 2021, 2022, 2023, 2024, 2025
- National Hurling League: 2012, 2013, 2014, 2018, 2021
- Walsh Cup: 2012, 2014, 2017
- All-Ireland Intermediate Hurling Championship: 2010
- Leinster Intermediate Hurling Championship: 2010, 2011
- Leinster Under-21 Hurling Championship: 2009
- All-Ireland Minor Hurling Championship: 2008
- Leinster Minor Hurling Championship: 2008

=== Individual ===
- All-Stars: 2016, 2018, 2021, 2023

Achievements
Preceded by Darren McCarthy (University College Cork)	Fitzgibbon Cup Final winning captain 2014	Succeeded by David McInerney (University of Limerick)
