= 2024–25 All-Ireland Junior Club Hurling Championship =

Gaelic sports event in Ireland

Championship Details
- Dates: 26 October 2024 - 12 January 2025
- Teams: 31

All Ireland Champions
- Winners: St Lachtain's (1st win)
- Captain: Criomhthann Bergin
- Manager: Steven Farrell

All Ireland Runners-up
- Runners-up: Russell Rovers
- Captain: Ciarán Sheehan
- Manager: Dave Dorgan

Provincial Champions
- Munster: Russell Rovers
- Leinster: St Lachtain's
- Ulster: Ballinascreen
- Connacht: Easkey

Championship Statistics
- Matches Played: 31
- Total Goals: 99 (3.19 per game)
- Total Points: 935 (30.16 per game)
- Top Scorer: Eamon Conway

The 2024–25 All-Ireland Junior Club Hurling Championship was the 21st staging of the All-Ireland Junior Club Hurling Championship, the Gaelic Athletic Association's junior inter-county club hurling tournament. The championship ran from 26 October 2024 to 12 January 2025.

The All-Ireland final was played on 12 January 2025 at Croke Park in Dublin, between St Lachtain's from Kilkenny and Russell Rovers from Cork, in what was their first ever meeting in the final. St Lachtain's won the match by 1–18 to 0–16 to claim their first All-Ireland Junior title.

Ballinascreen's Eamon Conway was the championship's top scorer.

== Format ==
Several Irish counties play a county hurling championship, with one club progressing to the All-Ireland Senior Club Junior Championship. This includes:

- the top-tier competition (Senior County Championship) in several high-ranked hurling counties.
- the second-tier competition (called the Intermediate or Junior Championship) in some mid-ranked hurling counties
- the third-tier competition (called the Junior, Premier Junior, Junior 1 or Junior A Championship) in the low-ranked hurling counties

Each province plays their own championship (all being straight knockout) with the four provincial champions qualifying for the All-Ireland Junior semi-finals. In Ulster, the nine teams play off, with the winner of the 'home' final playing the winners of the All-Britain Club Hurling Championship in the Ulster final.

The senior champions of the top hurling counties play in the 2024–25 All-Ireland Senior Club Hurling Championship. Other county winners play in the 2024–25 All-Ireland Intermediate Club Hurling Championship.

== Team summaries ==
Team	Championship	Most recent success		
Team	Championship	All-Ireland	Provincial	County
Amsterdam	Europe SHC			2024
Avondale	Wicklow IHC			2018
Ballela	Down JHC			2021
Ballinasloe	Galway J1HC			
Ballinascreen	Derry JHC			
Banner	Clare JAHC			
Brownstown	Westmeath IHC			2015
Buncrana	Donegal IHC			
Burren Rangers	Carlow JAHC			
Carrick	Leitrim SHC		2018	2022
Crumlin	Dublin JAHC			
Drumcullen	Offaly IHC			2010
Easkey	Sligo SHC		2023	2023
East Cavan Gaels	Cavan SHC			
Erne Gaels	Fermanagh SHC			
Feenagh–Kilmeedy	Limerick PJAHC			2013
Fr. Murphy's	All-Britain CHC			
Inniskeen Grattans	Monaghan SHC		2010	
Kilgarvan	Kerry IHC			2022
Kilrossanty	Waterford JAHC			
Liam Mellows	Wexford IHC			1967
Moorefield	Kildare IHC			2010
Mountmellick	Laois IHC			1967
Moyle Rovers	Tipperary JAHC		2007	2007
Navan O'Mahonys	Meath IHC			2017
Omagh St Enda's	Tyrone JHC			2023
Rasharkin	Antrim JAHC			2015
Russell Rovers	Cork PJHC		2019	2019
Seán Treacys	Armagh JHC			2022
St Fechin's	Louth SHC			2023
St Lachtain's	Kilkenny PJHC			1993
Wolfe Tones	Longford SHC			2020

== Connacht Junior Club Hurling Championship ==
=== Semi-final ===
2 November 2024 Semi-final	Easkey (Sligo)	2-22 - 2-06	Carrick (Leitrim)	Markievicz Park
	A Kilcullen 1-10 (0-55f, 0-1 65’), A Rolston 1-1, J McHugh 0-4, F Connolly 0-2, M Gordon, C Vereker, P Walsh, D Hanley, D Rolston and 0-1 each.	Report	J McNabola and C Beirne 1-1 each, C Flanagan 0-3f, C McLoughlin 0-1.

=== Final ===
17 November 2024 Final	Ballinasloe (Galway)	1-11 - 0-18	Easkey (Sligo)	Connacht GAA Centre of Excellence
13:30 IWT (UTC±0)	C O'Hanlon 0-6 (0-5f), J Dillon 1-2, E Hayes, A Caulfield and M Fogarty, 0-1 each.	Report	A Kilcullen 0-13 (0-8f, 0-1 65’), J McHugh, R Molloy, 0-2 each, M Gordon 0-1.

== Leinster Junior Club Hurling Championship ==
The draw for the Leinster Club Championship took place in June 2024.

=== Leinster round 1 ===
9 November 2024 Round 1	St Fechin's (Louth)	6-23 - 2-13	Amsterdam (Europe)	Gaelic Grounds
13:00 IWT (UTC±0)	R Walsh 2-3, P Matthews 2-1, S Kerrisk 1-2, P Lynch 0-5, D Stone 1-1, R Morrissey 0-4, R Berkery 0-4, S Conneely 0-2, S Hodgins 0-1.	Report	G McDermott 0-7, L Ryan 1-2, D Murphy 1-1, D O'Farrell 0-1, E Gaffey 0-1, S Brogan 0-1.

9 November 2024 Round 1	Avondale (Wicklow)	1-21 - 0-18 (aet)	Navan O'Mahonys (Meath)	Echelon Park
13:30 IWT (UTC±0)	Z Cullen 1-14, G Murphy 0-3, T Mulconry 0-1, K Phelan 0-1, P Gahan 0-1, S Brown 0-1.	Report	C Keyes 0-9, T Condon 0-4, C O'Toole 0-3, S Formosa 0-1, S McDermott 0-1.

9 November 2024 Round 1	Burren Rangers (Carlow)	1-12 - 0-19	Brownstown (Westmeath)	Netwatch Cullen Park
13:30 IWT (UTC±0)	D Townsend 0-5 (4fs, 1’65), T Donald 1-0, C Bolger 0-2, B Nolan 0-2, D Bolger 0-1, C Healy 0-1, J Nolan 0-1.	Report	J Fitzsimons 0-8 (7fs, 1’65), E Cunneen 0-3, N Leonard 0-2, B Guerin 0-2, R Dugdale 0-2, T Flynn 0-1, P O’Reilly 0-1.

9 November 2024 Round 1	Moorefield (Kildare)	0-05 - 6-19	Liam Mellows (Wexford)	Manguard Park
13:30 IWT (UTC±0)	R Gavin 0-5 (5f).	Report	R Brooks 2-1, E Cullen 0-7 (4 frees), J Gardiner 1-2, D O'Toole 1-1, S Og Stafford 1-0, C Carty 1-0, R Cody 0-3, A Merrigan 0-1, B Halpin 0-1, G Stamp 0-1 (1 free), J Higgins 0-1, R Kinsella 0-1.

10 November 2024 Round 1	St Lachtain's (Kilkenny)	2-23 - 1-17	Drumcullen (Offaly)	UPMC Nowlan Park
13:30 IWT (UTC±0)	D Maher (1-4); S Donnelly (1-3); C O’Leary (0-4, 0-3 frees and 0-1 ‘65); L Hickey (0-3, 0-2 frees); M Donnelly (0-3); J Maher, P Killeen (0-2 each); B Kennedy, A Rafter (0-1 each)	Report	E Gath (0-10, 0-9 frees); Colm Gath (1-1); S Hanrahan (0-3); J Murray, M Kennedy, Conor Gath (0-1 each)

=== Leinster quarter-finals ===
16 November 2024 Quarter-final	St Fechin's (Louth)	1-16 - 1-14	Brownstown (Westmeath)	Gaelic Grounds
13:30 IWT (UTC±0)	P Lynch (0-8, frees), R Berkery (1-1), P Mathews (0-3), S Conneely (0-1), R Walsh (0-1), D Stephenson (0-1), S Kerrisk (0-1), R Morrissey (0-1).	Report	J Fitzsimons (0-7, frees), R Dugdale (1-1), D Lane (0-2), E Cunneen (0-2), N Leonard (0-1), C Shaw (0-1), B Guerin (0-1).

16 November 2024 Quarter-final	Avondale (Wicklow)	1-18 - 1-14	Mountmellick (Laois)	Pearse Park
13:30 IWT (UTC±0)	Z Cullen (0-5); K Phelan (1-1), T Mulconry (0-4), E Owens (0-3), C Baker (0-3), S Byrne (0-2).	Report	M Bermingham (0-7); J Connolly (1-1), F Culleton (0-3), C Browne (0-1), J Connolly (0-1), C McEvoy (0-1).

16 November 2024 Quarter-final	Crumlin (Dublin)	1-07 - 5-20	St Lachtain's (Kilkenny)	Parnell Park
13:30 IWT (UTC±0)	K Elliott (0-4, fees); S Caswell (1-0); C Murphy, R Smith; A McGreall (0-1, each).	Report	C O’Leary (0-9, 0-4 frees & 0-1 ’65); D Maher (2-0); P Killeen (1-1); L Hickey (0-4); A Rafter (1-1); C Dawson (1-0); James Maher (0-2); Brian Kennedy, Cathal Hicke; Alexander Rafter (0-1, each).

23 November 2024 Quarter-final	Liam Mellows (Wexford)	6-28 - 0-06	Wolfe Tones (Longford)	Glennon Bros Pearse Park
13:30 IWT (UTC±0)	D Daly O’Toole (1-4), J Gardiner (1-3), E Cullen (0-6, 4f, 1 ‘65), J Higgins (1-1), C Kennedy (1-1), A Murphy (0-4), R Cody (0-4); S Óg Stafford (1-0), M Halpin (1-0); R Farrell (0-1); R Heffernan (0-1), B Halpin (0-1), C Carty (0-1), D Goland (0-1).	Report	C Mullane (0-5), M Coyle (0-1).	Referee: Sean Maher (Offaly)

=== Leinster semi-finals ===
24 November 2024 Semi-final	Avondale (Wicklow)	0-11 - 4-18	St Lachtain's (Kilkenny)	Old Connaught Avenue
13:30 IWT (UTC±0)	Z Cullen (0-9, 8f), G Murphy (0-1), K Byrne (0-1)	Report	S Donnelly (1-3) D Maher (1-3), C O’Leary (0-5, 1f, 2,’45’), J Maher (0-4), D Brennan (1-0), Alexander Rafter (1-0), Alan Rafter (0-1), L Hickey (0-1), Brian Kennedy (0-1)

30 November 2024 Semi-final	St Fechin's (Louth)	1-13 - 1-15	Liam Mellows (Wexford)	Integral GAA Grounds
13:30 IWT (UTC±0)	P Lynch (0-9, 7f, one s/l, one ’65), S Conneely (1-0), R Berkery (0-3), D Stephenson (0-1).	Report	E Cullen (0-8, 7f), J Higgins (1-1), D Daly O’Toole (0-2), R Cody (0-1); B Halpin (0-1); S Og Stafford (0-1), M Halpin (0-1).

=== Leinster final ===
7 December 2024 Final	St Lachtain's (Kilkenny)	3-08 - 2-10	Liam Mellows (Wexford)	UPMC Nowlan Park
	J Maher 1-1, S Donnelly 1-1, C Dawson 1-0, L Hickey 0-3, C O’Leary 0–2 (1f), Alexander Rafter 0-1.	Report	E Cullen 0-7 (6f), J Higgins 1-1, R Brooks 1-0, R Cody 0–2.

== Munster Junior Club Hurling Championship ==
The draw for the Munster Club Championship took place on 25 July 2024.

=== Munster quarter-final ===
2 November 2024 Quarter-final	Kilrossanty (Waterford)	0-19 - 0-17	Feenagh–Kilmeedy (Limerick)	Páirc Naomh Bríd
	P Fitzgerald 0-13 (4fs, 1 65), J Power 0-3, D Walsh, A Dunwoody, E Power 0-1 each.	Report	D Coleman 0-14 (9fs), M Fitzgibbon 0-2, P O'Doherty 0-1.

2 November 2024 Quarter-final	Moyle Rovers (Tipperary)	0-25 - 1-10	Kilgarvan (Kerry)	Ardfinnan Grounds
	D Ryan (0-14, 0-8f, 0-1 65), S English 0-3, A Phelan, K Butler 0-2 each, D Luttrell, B Owens, R Quigley, R Collins all 0-1 each.	Report	D Casey 1-1, G Egan 0-3, S Godfrey (0-3, 0-2f), G Fennessy (0-2, 0-1f, 0-1 sl-cut), R Foley 0-1.

=== Munster semi-finals ===
16 November 2024 Semi-final	Banner (Clare)	0-20 - 3-15	Kilrossanty (Waterford)	Páirc an Dálaigh
13:15 IWT (UTC±0)	S Meehan 0-12, R Kilroy 0-3, F Hayes 0-2, T Keenaghan 0-2, J Martin 0-1.	Report	P Fitzgerald 2-8, A Dunwoody 1-3, J Kay 0-2, F de Paor 0-1, J Power 0-1.	Referee: Ciaran O’Donovan (Tipperary)

16 November 2024 Semi-final	Russell Rovers (Cork)	3-13 - 0-13	Moyle Rovers (Tipperary)	Clonmult Memorial Park
13:15 IWT (UTC±0)	B Hartnett 2-3, J Beausang 1-5, K Moynihan 0-2, D Moynihan, L Duggan Murray, R Cummins 0-1 each.	Report	D Ryan 0-9 (8f), L Delahunty 0-2, A Phelan, K Butler 0-1 each.	Referee: Seaghan Walsh (Waterford)

=== Munster final ===
30 November 2024 Final	Russell Rovers (Cork)	3-12 - 1-07	Kilrossanty (Waterford)	Páirc Uí Rinn
13:00 IWT (UTC±0)	B Hartnett 2-2, J Beausang 0-7 (0-3 f), L Duggan-Murray 1-2, D Moynihan 0-1.	Report	P Fitzgerald 0-5 (0-3 f), E Power 1-0, S Fitzgerald (f), P Whyte 0-1.	Referee: A Tierney (Tipperary)

== Ulster Junior Club Hurling Championship ==
=== Ulster preliminary round ===
26 October 2024 Preliminary round	Erne Gaels (Fermanagh)	1-05 - 1-13	Seán Treacys (Armagh)	Brewster Park
	C Daly 0-4, T Burns 1-0, S McElroy 0-1.	Report	C Carbine 1-4, T McKavanagh 0-3, K Laverty 0-2, P Kane 0-2, R Magee 0-2.

=== Ulster quarter-finals ===
2 November 2024 Quarter-final	Ballinascreen (Derry)	3-33 - 1-07	Inniskeen Grattans (Monaghan)	Celtic Park
	E Conway 0-14 (5f, 1 65"), R McSorley (2-3), P Cleary (1-3), E McCallion (0-3), B Kealey (0-2), R McWilliams (0-2), A Kelly (0-2), N Rafferty (0-2), M Bradley (0-1), C Gough (0-1)	Report

2 November 2024 Quarter-final	Buncrana (Donegal)	0-10 - 2-13	Ballela (Down)	O'Donnell Park
	C O’Neill 0-4 (0-3f); D Duffy & P Tourish (1f) 0-2 each; D Carey & C Grant 0-1 each	Report	M Magee 0-6 (0-4f); J McCusker 0-5 (0-4f); K Magee 1-1; N Fegan 1-0; J Haughey 0-1

2 November 2024 Quarter-final	East Cavan Gaels (Cavan)	6-10 - 1-14	Omagh St Enda's (Tyrone)	Kingspan Breffni
	N Kenny 1-5, L O'Brien 1-1, R Farrell 1-1, D Leddy 1-0, J Tully 1-0, C McEntee 1-0, J McGuinness 0-1, C Maher 0-1, K McGuinness 0-1.	Report	F Corry 1-1, C Lagan 0-4, E Campbell 0-3, M Corry 0-2, P McKernaghan 0-1, O McGuigan 0-1, D Woodhead 0-1, T McClements 0-1.

2 November 2024 Quarter-final	Seán Treacys (Armagh)	0-13 - 4-23	Rasharkin (Antrim)	BOX-IT Athletic Grounds
	C Carabine 0-6 (4fs); A Carville 0-3; R Magee 0-2; N Corey 0-1; D Maher 0-1	Report	C McKeever 1-9 (5fs 2’65s); D Quigg 2-3; C McKillop 1-4; S Hasson 0-2; C McFerran 0-2; T O’Boyle 0-1; C Henderson 0-1; B Og O’Neill 0-1

=== Ulster semi-finals ===
10 November 2024 Semi-final	Ballinascreen (Derry)	0-23 - 1-12	Ballela (Down)	Donaghmore Road
		Report

10 November 2024 Semi-final	East Cavan Gaels (Cavan)	4-16 - 1-15	Rasharkin (Antrim)	Páirc Colmcille
	L O'Brien 0-10, N Kenny 1-4, R Farrell 2-0, C McEntee 1-0, D Leddy 0-1, J Barry 0-1.	Report

=== Ulster home final ===
17 November 2024 Home final	Ballinascreen (Derry)	1-25 - 3-09	East Cavan Gaels (Cavan)	Eoghan Ruadh, Dungannon
15:30 GMT (UTC±0)	E Conway 1-7 (1-1f); P Cleary 0-5; N Rafferty 0-4; E McCallion 0-3; C McBride & M Bradley 0-2 each; R McSorley & C Gough (f) 0-1 each	Report	N Kenny 1-3; L O’Brien 0-4 (0-3f); R Farrell 1-0; C Maher & J McGuinness 0-1 each

=== Ulster twinning final ===
1 December 2024 Final	Ballinascreen (Derry)	1-19 - 0-06	Fr. Murphy's (London)	Owenbeg Centre of Excellence
	E Conway 0-9 (6f); P Cleary 1-3; E McCallion, M Bradley 0-2; R McWilliams, Noel Rafferty, James McDaid 0-1 each	Report	M Burke 0-2fs; T Foley, E O’Leary, E Power, S Griffith 0-1 each	Referee: M Connolly (Sligo)

== All-Ireland Junior Club Hurling Championship ==
=== All-Ireland semi-finals ===
14 December 2024 Semi-final	Russell Rovers (Cork)	2-22 - 1-09	Ballinascreen (Derry)	The Downs Grounds
13:00 IWT (UTC±0)	J Beausang 1-5 (1-3 f), L Duggan-Murray 1-3, B Hartnett 0-5 (0-2 f), D Ruddy 0-3, J Kennefick, P Lane, F Murray, R Cummins, M O’Dwyer, C Sheehan 0-1 each.	Report	E Conway 0-6 (0-5 f), E McCallion 1-1, C Gough (sideline), P Cleary (f) 0-1 each.

15 December 2024 Semi-final	Easkey (Sligo)	0-13 - 3-15	St Lachtain's (Kilkenny)	Duggan Park
13:00 IWT (UTC±0)	A Kilcullen 0-9 (6fs), T Cawley 0-2, R McHugh 0-1, R Molloy 0-1.	Report	D Maher 1-1, C O'Leary 1-1, S Donnelly 1-2, L Hickey 0-9 (5fs), D Brennan 0-1f, M Donnelly 0-1

=== All-Ireland final ===
12 January 2025 Final	Russell Rovers (Cork)	0-16 - 1-18	St Lachtain's (Kilkenny)	Croke Park
	J Beausang 0-8 (0-6 f, 0-1 65), L Duggan Murray 0-2, K Moynihan, C Sheehan, J Kennefick, F Murray, J McGrath, M O’Dwyer 0-1 each.	Report	S Donnelly 1-1, A Rafter, L Hickey (0-1 f, 0-1 sdl) 0-3 each, J Maher, C Hickey 0-2 each, C O’Leary, P Killeen, B Quinn, M Donnelly, B Kennedy, D Brennan (f), D Maher 0-1 each.	Referee: P Owens (Down)

== Championship statistics ==
=== Miscellaneous ===
- Easkey became the first team to win three successive Connacht Club JHC titles.
