= Brian Hartnett =

Irish hurler (born 1992)

Personal information
- Native name: Brian Ó hAirtneada (Irish)
- Nickname: Bud
- Born: 1992 (age 33–34) Shanagarry, County Cork, Ireland
- Occupation: Sales advisor

Sport
- Sport: Hurling
- Position: Right corner-forward
Clubs
- Years: Club
- Russell Rovers; Midleton
Club titles
- Cork titles: 1
College
- Years: College
- 2010-2015: University College Cork
College titles
- Fitzgibbon titles: 2
Inter-county*
Years	County	Apps (scores)
2011-2014	Cork	0 (0-00)
Inter-county titles
- Munster titles: 0
- All-Irelands: 0
- NHL: 0
- All Stars: 0
- *Inter County team apps and scores correct as of 15:52, 12 December 2021.

Brian Hartnett (born 1992) is an Irish hurler who plays for Cork Championship club Russell Rovers. He previously lined out with Midleton and the Cork senior hurling team.

== Career ==
Hartnett first played hurling as a schoolboy with Midleton CBS Secondary School with whom he lined out in the Harty Cup. He subsequently lined out with University College Cork and won consecutive Fitzgibbon Cup titles. Hartnett began his club career with Russell Rovers before winning a Cork SHC title with Midleton in 2013. After returning to Russell Rovers he lined out in the 2020 All-Ireland junior final defeat by Conahy Shamrocks. Hartnett first appeared on the inter-county scene during a two-year stint with the Cork minor hurling team before later playing with the under-21 and intermediate teams. He first played with the Cork senior hurling team during the pre-season Waterford Crystal Cup in 2011 and remained on the panel for a number of seasons. His brother, Kevin Hartnett, has also lined out with Cork at various levels.

== Career statistics ==
Team	Year	National League			Munster		All-Ireland		Total	
Team	Year	Division	Apps	Score	Apps	Score	Apps	Score	Apps	Score
Cork	2013	Division 1A	1	0-00	0	0-00	0	0-00	1	0-00
Cork	2014	Division 1B	3	0-02	0	0-00	0	0-00	3	0-02
Career total			4	0-02	0	0-00	0	0-00	4	0-02

== Honours ==
University College Cork

- Fitzgibbon Cup: 2012, 2013

Russell Rovers

- Munster Junior Club Hurling Championship: 2019
- Cork Junior A Hurling Championship: 2019
- East Cork Junior A Hurling Championship: 2018, 2019

Midleton

- Cork Senior Hurling Championship: 2013
