= Ger Aylward =

Irish hurler (born 1992)

Personal information
- Native name: Gearóid Aighleart (Irish)
- Born: 12 March 1992 (age 34) Glenmore, County Kilkenny, Ireland
- Occupation: Plumber
- Height: 5 ft 11 in (180 cm)

Sport
- Sport: Hurling
- Position: Right corner forward
Club
- Years: Club
- 2008–: Glenmore
Club titles
	Football	Hurling
Kilkenny titles	1	0
Inter-county*
Years	County	Apps (scores)
2013–2020	Kilkenny	18 (5-21)
Inter-county titles
- Leinster titles: 3
- All-Irelands: 2
- NHL: 0
- All Stars: 1
- *Inter County team apps and scores correct as of 23:50, 17 January 2021.

Ger Aylward (born 30 March 1992) is an Irish hurler who plays club hurling for Glenmore and played inter-county level with the Kilkenny senior hurling team until his retirement after the 2020 season. He usually lines out as a left corner-forward.

== Playing career ==
=== Good Counsel College ===
Aylward first came to prominence as a hurler with Good Counsel College in New Ross. He played in every grade of hurling before eventually joining the college's senior hurling team. On 14 March 2009, Aylward was at right corner-forward when Good Counsel College faced Castlecomer Community School in the Leinster final. He was held scoreless throughout the game but collected a winners' medal following the 1–13 to 2–08 victory. On 28 March 2009, Aylward was switched to full-forward when Good Counsel College faced Gort Community School in the All-Ireland final. He scored four points, including two from placed balls, and collected a winners' medal following the 1–12 to 0–11 victory.

=== Glenmore ===
Aylward joined the Glenmore club at a young age and played in all grades at juvenile and underage levels as a dual player before eventually joining the club's top adult teams in both hurling and Gaelic football.

On 10 October 2009, Aylward lined out at left corner-forward when Glenmore faced Muckalee in the Kilkenny Football Championship final. He ended the game with a winners' medal following the 2–7 to 0–10 victory.

On 25 October 2015, Aylward won a Kilkenny Junior Championship medal as part of the Glenmore hurling team that defeated Kilmacow by 1–12 to 2–06 in the final. On 16 January 2016, he lined out at right corner-forward when Glenmore faced Lusmagh in the Leinster final. Aylward scored five points and ended the game with a winners' medal following the 0–23 to 0–13 defeat of Lusmagh. A knee injury sustained in the All-Ireland semi-final against Dungourney ruled him out of the final against Eoghan Rua on 7 February 2016. In spite of this, Aylward collected an All-Ireland medal as a non-playing substitute following the 2–08 to 0–12 victory.

=== Kilkenny ===
==== Minor and under-21 ====
Aylward first played for Kilkenny as a member of the minor team during the 2009 Leinster Championship. On 5 July 2009, he lined out at full-forward when Kilkenny faced Wexford in a second successive Leinster final. Aylward scored 1-01 from play and collected a Leinster Championship medal following the 1–19 to 0–11 victory. On 6 September 2009, he started the All-Ireland final against Galway on the bench but was introduced as a 51st-minute substitute for Walter Walsh at full-forward. Aylward was held scoreless as Kilkenny suffered a 2–15 to 2–11 defeat.

Aylward was eligible for the minor grade again in 2010. On 4 July 2010, he won a second successive Leinster Championship medal following a 1–20 to 0–10 defeat of Dublin in the final. On 5 September, Aylward was at full-forward when Kilkenny faced Clare in the All-Ireland final. He scored a point from play and collected a winners' medal following the 2–10 to 0–14 victory.

Aylward was drafted onto the Kilkenny under-21 for the 2011 Leinster Championship. He made his first appearance for the team on 7 June 2011 when he scored a goal in a 1–16 to 2–12 defeat by Wexford.

On 11 July 2012, Aylward won a Leinster Championship medal after top scoring with 2-05 from left corner-forward in a 4–24 to 1–13 defeat of Laois in the final. He retained his position for the All-Ireland final against Clare on 15 September 2012, in spite of tearing his hamstring in the All-Ireland semi-final. Aylward scored 1-01 from play in the 2–17 to 2–11 defeat by Clare.

==== Intermediate ====
Aylward was added to the Kilkenny intermediate team for the 2012 Leinster Championship. He made his first appearance for the team on 28 June 2012 and collected a Leinster Championship medal after scoring two points in a 3–20 to 2–14 defeat of Wexford. Awylard was at left corner-forward for the All-Ireland final against Tipperary on 1 September 2012. He was held scoreless in the 3–13 to 1–17 defeat.

==== Senior ====
Aylward was added to the Kilkenny senior panel in advance of the 2013 National League. He made his senior debut on 10 March 2013 when he came on as a substitute in a 2–17 to 1–19 defeat by Tipperary. Aylward's progress was hampered after injuring his knee against Cork in April and then tearing ligaments in his ankle in a club game. On 29 June 2013, he made his Leinster Championship debut when he came on as a 64th-minute substitute for T. J. Reid at full-forward in a 1–16 to 0–16 defeat by Dublin.

Aylward was a member of the extended training panel for much of the 2014 season, however, he failed to make a single competitive appearance that year. He ended the season by collecting an All-Ireland medal following Kilkenny's 2–17 to 2–14 defeat of Tipperary in the All-Ireland final replay.

On 5 July 2015, Aylward was at right corner-forward when Kilkenny faced Galway in the Leinster final. He scored three points and collected a winners' medal following the 1–25 to 2–15 victory. On 6 September 2015, Aylward was again named at right wing-forward for the All-Ireland final against Galway. He scored two points from play and collected his first All-Ireland medal on the field of play following the 1–22 to 1–18 victory. Aylward ended the season by receiving an All-Star award.

On 24 January 2016, Aylward suffered a torn cruciate in a club match. He later said: "It was a freak accident, I was going in for a tackle and the Dungourney player hit me accidentally on the outside of my knee. Whatever way I went down, I could feel a dunt inside of the knee and I knew it wasn’t good from there." The injury ruled Aylward out of the 2016 season with Kilkenny.

On 8 April 2018, Aylward was an unused substitute when Kilkenny defeated Tipperary by 2–23 to 2–17 to win the National League title. He was selected at left corner-forward when Kilkenny faced Galway in the Leinster final on 1 July 2018. Aylward scored a point from play in the 0-18 apiece draw. He retained his position for the replay a week later and scored one of three goals for Kilkenny in the 1–28 to 3–15 defeat.

On 30 June 2019, Aylward was named amongst the substitutes when Kilkenny faced Wexford in the Leinster final. He scored a point from play after being introduced as a substitute for Alan Murphy but ended on the losing side following a 1–23 to 0–23 defeat. On 18 August 2019, Aylward was an unused substitute when Kilkenny suffered a 3–25 to 0–20 defeat by Tipperary in the All-Ireland final.

== Career statistics ==
As of match played 28 November 2020.

Team	Year	National League			Leinster		All-Ireland		Total	
Team	Year	Division	Apps	Score	Apps	Score	Apps	Score	Apps	Score
Kilkenny	2013	Division 1A	4	2-02	1	0-00	1	0-00	6	2-02
Kilkenny	2014	Division 1A	0	0-00	0	0-00	0	0-00	0	0-00
Kilkenny	2015	Division 1A	2	0-01	2	3-08	2	0-07	6	3-16
Kilkenny	2016	Division 1A	—		—		—		—	
Kilkenny	2017	Division 1A	0	0-00	1	0-00	2	0-01	3	0-01
Kilkenny	2018	Division 1A	3	0-04	4	1-01	1	0-00	8	1-05
Kilkenny	2019	Division 1A	2	0-05	4	1-04	0	0-00	6	1-09
Kilkenny	2020	Division 1A	4	3-03	0	0-00	0	0-00	4	3-03
Total			15	5-15	12	5-13	6	0-08	33	10-36

== Honours ==
=== Player ===
Good Counsel College

- Leinster Colleges Senior Hurling Championship: 2009

Glenmore

- Kilkenny Senior Football Championship: 2009
- Kilkenny Intermediate Hurling Championship: 2021 (c)
- All-Ireland Junior Club Hurling Championship: 2016
- Leinster Junior Club Hurling Championship: 2016
- Kilkenny Junior Hurling Championship: 2015

Kilkenny

- All-Ireland Senior Hurling Championship: 2014, 2015
- Leinster Senior Hurling Championship: 2014, 2015, 2020
- Leinster Under-21 Hurling Championship: 2012
- All-Ireland Minor Hurling Championship: 2010
- Leinster Minor Hurling Championship: 2009, 2010

=== Individual ===
- All-Stars (1): 2015
