= Tom Phelan (hurler) =

Irish hurler (born 1995)

Personal information
- Born: 25 December 1995 (age 30) Jenkinstown, County Kilkenny, Ireland
- Occupation: Milk supply manager
- Height: 6 ft 1 in (185 cm)

Sport
- Sport: Hurling
- Position: Right wing-forward
Club
- Years: Club
- Conahy Shamrocks
Club titles
- Kilkenny titles: 0
College
- Years: College
- 2014-2018: University College Dublin
College titles
- Fitzgibbon titles: 0
Inter-county*
Years	County	Apps (scores)
2022-present	Kilkenny	8 (2-10)
Inter-county titles
- Leinster titles: 2
- All-Irelands: 0
- NHL: 0
- All Stars: 0
- *Inter County team apps and scores correct as of 13:19, 10 July 2023.

Thomas Phelan (born 25 December 1995) is an Irish hurler. At club level he plays with Conahy Shamrocks, while at inter-county level he plays with the Kilkenny senior hurling team.

== Career ==
Phelan first played hurling at juvenile and underage levels with the Conahy Shamrocks club. He later played with University College Dublin in the Fitzgibbon Cup. After progressing to adult club level, Phelan was at right wing-forward when Conahy Shamrocks beat Russell Rovers to win the All-Ireland Club JHC title in 2020. He added a Kilkenny JHC medal to his collection later that year.

Having never played minor hurling at inter-county level, Phelan first appeared for Kilkenny as a member of the under-21 panel in 2015. He later progressed to the intermediate team and won an All-Ireland IHC medal after a defeat of Cork in 2017. After a number of years out of the inter-county scene, Phelan was drafted onto the senior team in 2022. He has since won back-to-back Leinster SHC medals.

== Career statistics ==
As of 9 July 2023.

Team	Year	National League			Leinster		All-Ireland		Total	
Team	Year	Division	Apps	Score	Apps	Score	Apps	Score	Apps	Score
Kilkenny	2022	Division 1B	4	2-03	3	1-01	0	0-00	7	3-04
Kilkenny	2023	Division 1B	1	0-00	4	1-08	1	0-01	6	1-09
Career total			5	2-03	7	2-09	1	0-01	13	4-13

== Honours ==
Conahy Shamrocks

- All-Ireland Junior Club Hurling Championship: 2020
- Leinster Junior Club Hurling Championship: 2019
- Kilkenny Junior Hurling Championship: 2019

Kilkenny

- Leinster Senior Hurling Championship: 2022, 2023
- All-Ireland Intermediate Hurling Championship: 2017
- Leinster Intermediate Hurling Championship: 2017
