= 2021 Kilkenny Intermediate Hurling Championship =

- Dates: 9 October – 14 November 2021
- Teams: 12
- Sponsor: Michael Lyng Motors Hyundai
- Champions: Glenmore (2nd title); Ger Aylward (captain); Declan Wall (manager)
- Runners-up: St. Lachtain's; Steven Farrell (manager)
- Relegated: John Locke's

Tournament statistics
- Matches played: 14
- Goals scored: 34 (2.43 per match)
- Points scored: 416 (29.71 per match)
- Top scorer(s): Paul Holden (3-21); Liam Hickey (2-24)

The 2021 Kilkenny Intermediate Hurling Championship was the 57th staging of the Kilkenny Intermediate Hurling Championship since its establishment by the Kilkenny County Board in 1929. The championship began on 9 October 2021 and ended on 14 November 2021.

The final was played on 14 November 2021 at UPMC Nowlan Park in Kilkenny, between Glenmore and St. Lachtain's, in what was their first ever meeting in a final. Glenmore won the match by 3–19 to 2–09 to claim their second championship title overall and a first title in 40 years.

Paul Holden and Liam Hickey were the championship's top scorers.

== Team changes ==
=== To Championship ===
Promoted from the Kilkenny Junior Hurling Championship

- Conahy Shamroks

Relegated from the Kilkenny Senior Hurling Championship

- Danesfort

=== From Championship ===
Promoted to the Kilkenny Senior Hurling Championship

- Lisdowney

Relegated to the Kilkenny Junior Hurling Championship

- St. Patrick's, Ballyragget

== Results ==
=== First round ===
9 October 2021 First round	Fenians	2-13 - 0-17	Dunnamaggin	Bennettsbridge GAA Grounds
	C Tobin 2-2, M Webster 0-5, W Brennan 0-3, K Grehan 0-1, D Tobin 0-1.		D Walsh 0-5, J Fitzpatrick 0-5, A Hickey 0-3, E Kearney 0-1, D Fitzpatrick 0-1, D O'Keeffe 0-1, M Cody 0-1.	Referee: O Kenny

10 October 2021 First round	St. Lachtain's	2-14 - 0-16	John Locke's	Tom Ryall Park
	L Hickey 0-8, S Donnelly 2-0, A Rafter 0-2, J Maher 0-2, D Maher 0-2.		M Prendergast 0-10, R Bergin 0-2, S Bergin 0-1, M Houlihan 0-1, E Scriven 0-1, C Phelan 0-1.	Referee: M Flynn

10 October 2021 First round	Conahy Shamrocks	1-16 - 1-23	Danesfort	Thomastown GAA Grounds
	J Bergin 0-8, K Mooney 1-1, E Delaney 0-3, T Phelan 0-2, E Cahill 0-1, M Gunner 0-1.		J Mullally 0-7, J Bruton 1-1, P Murphy 0-3, P Hogan 0-3, G Tynan 0-3, R Walsh 0-3, P Hickey 0-2, P Cooney 0-1.	Referee: P Burke

10 October 2021 First round	Young Irelands	1-14 - 1-19	O'Loughlin Gaels	Canon Kearns Park
	P Holden 1-10, S Kehoe 0-2, JP Treacy 0-1, T Drea 0-1.		B Leydon 0-11, D Burke 1-1, S Johnston 0-3, D O'Connor 0-2, M Russell 0-1, C Bergin 0-1.	Referee: G Quilty

=== Relegation playoffs ===
23 October 2021 Semi-final	Dunnamaggin	0-17 - 2-09	Young Irelands	Thomastown GAA Grounds
	D Walsh 0-10, E Dunne 0-2, R Lodge 0-2, D O'Keeffe 0-1, R Cody 0-1, D Fitzpatrick 0-1.		P Holden 1-5, S Carey 0-3, G Brennan 1-0, D Carey 0-1.

23 October 2021 Semi-final	John Locke's	1-10 - 0-17	Conahy Shamrocks	Tullaroan GAA Grounds
	R Bergin 0-5, M Prendergast 1-1, R Kerwick 0-1, B McDowell 0-1, S Bergin 0-1, E Scriven 0-1.		J Bergin 0-8, D Brennan 0-2, E Delaney 0-2, T Phelan 0-2, T Rice 0-1, K Mooney 0-1, J Mullan 0-1.

6 November 2021 Final	Young Irelands	3-13 - 1-07	John Locke's	Páirc na Seamróg
	P Holden (1-6, 1-5 frees, 0-1 65); S Kehoe (1-1); T Drea (1-0); S Carey (0-3); P Kinsella, C Nolan, M Carey (0-1 each).	Report	E Scriven (1-0); M Prendergast (0-3, frees); O McGrath (0-2); C Phelan, R Kerwick (0-1 each).

=== Quarter-finals ===
16 October 2021 Quarter-final	St. Martin's	2-16 - 1-20	Fenians	St. Patrick's Park
	L Maher (1-4), S Kinsella (0-6, 0-6f), C McGrath (1-2, 0-1f), B Cody (0-2), J Manning, J Mulhall (0-1 each)	Report	M Webster (0-10, 0-9f), JJ Delaney (1-2), K Grehan (0-3), M Carroll (0-2), C Tobin (0-1, 0-1f), D Tobin, W Brennan (0-1 each).

17 October 2021 Quarter-final	Thomastown	2-24 - 2-13	O'Loughlin Gaels	Bennettsbridge GAA Grounds
	R Donnelly 0-8, T O'Hanrahan 0-6, J Donnelly 1-2, D Barron 1-0, S Donnelly 0-2, D Waugh 0-2, JJ Farrell 0-2, E Donnelly 0-1, P McDonald 0-1.		B Leydon 0-6, D Loughnane 1-0, F Brennan 0-2, S Johnston 0-2, D O'Connor 0-1, D Burke 0-1, E Walsh 0-1.

17 October 2021 Quarter-final	Carrickshock	1-14 - 1-17	St. Lachtain's	UPMC Nowlan Park
	E O'Neill 0-8, J O'Dwyer 1-3, K Farrell 0-2, D Brennan 0-1.		L Hickey 0-8, S Donnelly 1-1, J Maher 0-3, N McGee 0-2, C Dawson 0-1, A Rafter 0-1, J Fitzpatrick 0-1.

17 October 2021 Quarter-final	Glenmore	2-15 - 0-13	Danesfort	UPMC Nowlan Park
	I Byrne 1-8, M Aylward 1-2, G Aylward 0-3, E Murphy 0-1, A Murphy 0-1.		R Hogan 0-4, R Walsh 0-2, P Murphy 0-2, J Mullally 0-1, P Hogan 0-1, C Phelan 0-1, G Tynan 0-1, P Mullen 0-1.

=== Semi-finals ===
31 October 2021 Semi-final	Fenians	0-10 - 2-12	St. Lachtain's	UPMC Nowlan Park
	M Webster (0-6, 0-4 frees); W Brennan (0-2); C Tobin, D Tobin (0-1 each).	Report	L Hickey (2-5, 0-5 frees); C Dawson (0-2); N McGree, S Donnelly, D Maher, J Maher (0-1 each).

31 October 2021 Semi-final	Thomastown	1-13 - 0-19	Glenmore	UPMC Nowlan Park
	R Donnelly (0-6, 0-6 frees); T O’Hanrahan (1-3); S Donnelly (0-2); P McDonald, N Dempsey (0-1 each).	Report	A Murphy (0-10, 0-8 frees); I Byrne, G Aylward, L Hennessy, S Murphy (0-2 each); E Murphy (0-1).

=== Final ===
14 November 2021 Final	St. Lachtain's	2-09 - 3-19	Glenmore	UPMC Nowlan Park
	J Maher (0-4), C Dawson, S Donnelly (1-0 each), L Hickey (0-3, 0-2f), A Rafter (0-2)	Report	A Murphy (1-5, 0-4f), G Aylward (1-4), M Aylward (1-1), I Byrne (0-4, 0-1f), L Hennessey (0-3), R Fitzgerald, E Murphy (0-1 each)	Referee: C Everard (Graigue-Ballycallan)

== Championship statistics ==
=== Top scorers ===
Top scorers overall

Rank	Player	Club	Tally	Total	Matches	Average
1	Paul Holden	Young Irelands	3-21	30	3	10.00
1	Liam Hickey	St. Lachtain's	2-24	30	4	7.50
3	Mark Webster	Fenians	0-21	21	3	7.00
4	Alan Murphy	Glenmore	1-16	19	3	6.33
5	Ian Byrne	Glenmore	1-14	17	3	5.66
5	Mikey Prendergast	John Locke's	1-14	17	3	5.66
5	Billy Leydon	O'Loughlin Gaels	0-17	17	2	8.50
8	James Bergin	Conahy Shamrocks	0-16	16	2	8.00
9	Shane Donnelly	St. Lachtain's	4-02	14	4	3.50
9	Robbie Donnelly	Thomastown	0-14	14	2	7.00

In a single game

Rank	Player	Club	Tally	Total	Opposition
1	Paul Holden	Young Irelands	1-10	13	O'Loughlin Gaels
2	Liam Hickey	St. Lachtain's	2-05	11	Fenians
2	Ian Byrne	Glenmore	1-08	11	Danesfort
2	Billy Leydon	O'Loughlin Gaels	0-11	11	Young Irelands
5	Mikey Prendergast	John Locke's	0-10	10	St. Lachtain's
5	Mark Webster	Fenians	0-10	10	St. Martin's
5	Alan Murphy	Glenmore	0-10	10	Thomastown
5	Denis Walsh	Dunnamaggin	0-10	10	Young Irelands
9	Paul Holden	Young Irelands	1-06	9	John Locke's
10	Conor Tobin	Fenians	2-02	8	Dunnamaggin
10	Alan Murphy	Glenmore	1-05	8	St. Lachtain's
10	Paul Holden	Young Irelands	1-05	8	Dunnamaggin
10	Liam Hickey	St. Lachtain's	0-08	8	John Locke's
10	James Bergin	Conahy Shamrocks	0-08	8	Danesfort
10	Robbie Donnelly	Thomastown	0-08	8	O'Loughlin Gaels
10	Liam Hickey	St. Lachtain's	0-08	8	Carrickshock
10	Eoghan O'Neill	Carrickshock	0-08	8	St. Lachtain's
10	James Bergin	Conahy Shamrocks	0-08	8	John Locke's
