= 2019–20 All-Ireland Junior Club Hurling Championship =

Championship Details
- Dates: 12 October 2019 - 18 January 2020
- Teams: 28

All Ireland Champions
- Winners: Conahy Shamrocks (2nd win)
- Captain: James Bergin
- Manager: Paul Buggy

All Ireland Runners-up
- Runners-up: Russell Rovers
- Captain: Daniel Moynihan
- Manager: Michael Mannion

Provincial Champions
- Munster: Russell Rovers
- Leinster: Conahy Shamrocks
- Ulster: Eoghan Rua
- Connacht: Mícheál Breathnach

Championship Statistics
- Matches Played: 27
- Total Goals: 71 (2.62 per game)
- Total Points: 744 (27.55 per game)
- Top Scorer: Seán Leo McGoldrick (1-42)

The 2019–20 All-Ireland Junior Club Hurling Championship was the 17th staging of the All-Ireland Junior Club Hurling Championship, the Gaelic Athletic Association's junior inter-county club hurling tournament. The championship began on 12 October 2019 and ended on 18 January 2020.

The All-Ireland final was played on 18 January 2020 at Croke Park in Dublin, between Conahy Shamrocks from Kilkenny and Russell Rovers from Cork, in what was their first ever meeting in the final. Conahy Shamrocks won the match by 0-22 to 0-15 to claim their second championship title overall and a first title in 12 years.

Eoghan Rua's Seán Leo McGoldrick was the championship's top scorer with 1-42.

== Connacht Junior Club Hurling Championship ==
=== Connacht semi-final ===
28 October 2019 Semi-final	Carrick Hurling Club	1-11 - 0-17	Naomh Eoin	Markievicz Park
	J McNabola 1-2, J Glancy 0-3, L Moreton 0-2, S O'Riordan 0-2, S Goldrick 0-1, C Ffrench 0-1.		T O'Kelly-Lynch 0-12, G O'Kelly-Lynch 0-4, N Feehily 0-1.	Referee: B Keon (Galway)

=== Connacht final ===
10 November 2019 Final	Mícheál Breathnach	1-12 - 0-08	Naomh Eoin	Connacht GAA Centre
	B Connolly 1-4, M Connolly 0-4, S Denvir 0-1, E Connolly 0-1, C Grealish 0-1, R Boland 0-1.		G O'Kelly-Lynch 0-5, T O'Kelly-Lynch 0-1, P Kilcoyne 0-1, M Davey 0-1.	Referee: J Judge (Mayo)

== Leinster Junior Club Hurling Championship ==
=== Leinster first round ===
19 October 2019 First round	Clann na nGael	4-17 - 1-10	Maynooth	St. Loman's Park
	C O'Sullivan 1-5, É Ó Donnchadha 1-4, G O'Sullivan 1-4, G Cole 1-1, C Garry 0-2, J O'Sullivan 0-1.	Report	C Forde 0-7, K Dunne 1-0, M Melia 0-2, J Millet 0-1.

19 October 2019 First round	Naomh Bríd	3-14 - 1-11	Naomh Moninne	McGrath Park
	A Amond 2-1, P Coughlan 1-0, E Holland 0-3, M Brennan 0-3, M Bambrick 0-3, N Roche 0-1, J Cahill 0-1, J Kehoe 0-1, M Cowman 0-1.		D Geoghegan 0-6, G Harrington 1-2, P Fallon 0-2, F Joyce 0-1.	Referee: C Daly (Kildare)

19 October 2019 First round	Fingallians	w/o - scr.	Clara

19 October 2019 First round	Clonguish Gaels	5-11 - 2-06	Barndarrig	Glennon Brothers Pearse Park
	J O'Brien 4-5, S Gregg 1-0, B Hanley 0-3, S O'Brien 0-2, F Molloy 0-1.		J McCaul 0-5, MO Byrne 1-0, M Murphy 1-0, M Cullen 0-1.	Referee: C Flynn (Westmeath)

=== Leinster quarter-finals ===
2 November 2019 Quarter-final	Naomh Bríd	1-12 - 3-09	Ballygarrett-Réalt na Mara	Fenagh Netwatch Training Centre
	A Amond 1-9 (1-0 pen, 0-6 frees), A Dunne 0-1, N Roche 0-1, M Cowman 0-1.	Report	J Hobbs 0-8 (0-7 frees, sl), E Corcoran 1-0, J Doyle 1-0, J Murphy 1-0, B Corcoran 0-1.	Referee: T Gleeson (Dublin)

2 November 2019 Quarter-final	Fingallians	1-09 - 2-17	Conahy Shamrocks	Lawless Memorial Park
	S Hickey (0-7, 0-6 Frees), D Power (1-2).	Report	K Mooney (1-7, 0-7 frees & 1-0 Penalty); T Phelan (1-3); T Rice (0-3, 0-1 free); E Delaney (0-2, 0-1 free); B Murphy (0-2).	Referee: C Flynn (Westmeath)

2 November 2019 Quarter-final	Clann na nGael	1-10 - 4-09	Cullion	Páirc Tailteann
	C O'Sullivan 0-6, G O'Sullivan 1-0, É Ó Donnchada 0-3, O Cassidy 0-1.		J Galvin 3-1, K Regan 0-5, B Stones 1-0, P Shaw 0-1, C Regan 0-1, M Tubridy 0-1.	Referee: A Kinahan (Offaly)

2 November 2019 Quarter-final	Clonguish Gaels	2-15 - 1-12	Mountmellick	Glennon Brothers Pearse Park
	J O’Brien (2-8, 0-1pen, 0-7fs), B Hanley (0-6, 4fs), K Burke (0-1).	Report	J Hillard (1-8, 8fs), D Hartnett (0-1), N Murphy (0-1), K Donoher (0-1); M Birmingham (0-1).	Referee: M Ryan (Dublin)

=== Leinster semi-finals ===
16 November 2019 Semi-final	Cullion	1-13 - 4-20	Ballygarrett-Réalt na Mara	TEG Cusack Park
	K Regan 1-6, J Galvin 0-4, B O'Reilly 0-1, C Regan 0-1, R Gillen 0-1.		J Hobbs 0-11, K Doyle 1-2, E Corcoran 1-1, P Naughter 1-0, S Quinn 1-0, J Doyle 0-2, T Sinnott 0-2, C Moore-Kavanagh 0-1, B Corcoran 0-1.

16 November 2019 Semi-final	Conahy Shamrocks	1-22 - 0-07	Clonguish Gaels	Polo Grounds
	K Mooney (0-9, 0-7 frees); T Phelan (0-5); E Cahill (1-0); J Mullan (0-2); E Delaney (0-2, free); E Carroll (0-1); D Brennan (0-1); B Murphy (0-1), K Downey (0-1).	Report	J O'Brien (0-6, 0-5 frees); B Hanley (0-1, free).	Referee: R Fitzsimons (Offaly)

=== Leinster final ===
30 November 2019 Final	Ballygarrett-Réalt na Mara	3-12 - 4-13	Conahy Shamrocks	Bellefield Park
	J Hobbs (1-9); S Quinn (1-0); E Corcoran (1-1); P Naughter (0-1); C Moore-Kavanagh (0-1).	Report	J Bergin (2-5); J Mullan (1-1); T Phelan (1-1); K Mooney (0-2); E Delaney (0-3); B Murphy (0-1).	Referee: R Fitzsimons (Offaly)

== Munster Junior Club Hurling Championship ==
=== Munster quarter-finals ===
16 November 2019 Quarter-final	Kilgarvan	1-11 - 2-21	Russell Rovers	FitzGerald Stadium
	D O’Sullivan 1-5, S Godfrey 0-4, D Casey 0-2.	Report	J Beausang 0-11 (0-6 f), L Duggan Murray 2-3, K Walsh and D Moynihan 0-2 each, B Hartnett, J Kennifick and J McGrath 0-1 each.	Referee: R McGann (Clare)

16 November 2019 Quarter-final	St. Mary's	3-10 - 0-14	Castletown/Ballyagran	Fraher Field
	E Kearns 1-6 (1-0 pen, 3fs, 1 s-l, 1 65), M Kearns 1-1, J Sheehan 1-0, K Sheehan 0-2, C Geary 0-1.	Report	H Dore 0-7 (4fs), D Riordan (2fs), J Dillon 0-3 each, John Walsh 0-1.	Referee: S Stokes (Cork)

=== Munster semi-final ===
23 November 2019 Semi-final	Carrick Davins	0-14 - 1-13	St. Mary's	Clonmel Sportsfield
	P Harris (0-3, 0-2f), M Whelan (0-3), C Whelan (0-2), L Mackey (0-2 65s), A Foran (0-1), B Roche (0-1), W O’Dwyer (0-1), N Butler (0-1).	Report	E Kearns (0-8, 0-4f), S Coffey (1-0), K Sheehan (0-3), S Fitzpatrick (0-1), J Sheehan (0-1).	Referee: M Maher (Cork)

- Russell Rovers received a bye in this round as there were no Clare representatives.

=== Munster final ===
8 December 2019 Final	St. Mary's	0-11 - 2-13	Russell Rovers	Fraher Field
	E Kearns (0-7, 0-6 frees), D Tobin, S Fitzpatrick, K Sheehan and JJ Coffey (0-1 each).	Report	J Beausang (1-8, 0-6 frees, 0-1 sl), B Hartnett (1-1), J McGrath (0-2), K Moynihan and K Walsh (0-1 each).	Referee: J O'Halloran (Limerick)

== Ulster Junior Club Hurling Championship ==
=== Ulster quarter-finals ===
12 October 2019 Quarter-final	Inniskeen	1-14 - 0-13	Naomh Colum Cille	St. Mary's Park
	P Dowdall 1-3, P McGahon 0-5, B McCabe 0-2, T Hilliard 0-2, K Crawley 0-1, G Dooley 0-1.		C Devlin 0-6, C Kearns 0-3, S Kelly 0-3, G Mulgrew 0-1.

13 October 2019 Quarter-final	Eoghan Rua	1-27 - 0-06	Mullahoran St. Joseph's	Owenbeg Complex
	R Mooney 0-9, C McGoldrick 1-2, L McGoldrick 0-5, SL McGoldrick 0-4, D McGoldrick 0-2, T Magee 0-2, A Rafferty 0-2, N Holly 0-1.		A Sheridan 0-1, H Briody 0-1, M Sexton 0-1, R Smith 0-1, E Dalton 0-1, D Dalton 0-1.

13 October 2019 Quarter-final	St. Eunan's	1-13 - 1-14	Gort na Móna	O'Donnell Park
	C O'Grady 0-9, J Hartnett 1-0, C O'Donnell 0-1, S McVeigh 0-1, T Hartnett 0-1, K Kealy 0-1.		D McClean 0-8, M Ward 1-0, P McCaffrey 0-3, D Boyd 0-2, S Kelly 0-1.

19 October 2019 Quarter-final	Seán Treacy's	0-13 - 1-13	Newry Shamrocks	Oliver Plunkett Park
	D Magee 0-4, J McKeever 0-3, N Corry 0-2, S McStravick 0-2, M Doran 0-1, R Shine 0-1.		A McGuinness 0-4, E McGuinness 0-3, R Campbell 0-2, C McPolin 0-1, R Courtney 0-1, N Lennon 0-1, S Campbell 0-1.

=== Ulster semi-finals ===
26 October 2019 Semi-final	Eoghan Rua	0-23 - 0-08	Inniskeen	Keady Grounds
	SL McGoldrick 0-9, A Rafferty 0-3, D Mooney 0-3, C McGoldrick 0-2, L McGoldrick 0-2, N Holly 0-2, R Mooney 0-1, T Magee 0-1,		P McGahon 0-3, P Dowdall 0-2, D McGahon 0-1, T Hilliard 0-1, M Murphy 0-1.

26 October 2019 Semi-final	Gort na Móna	1-09 - 0-16	Newry Shamrocks	Ballela
	D Boyd 1-2, D McClean 0-4, M Rae 0-1, P McCaffrey 0-1, M Ward 0-1.	Report	A McGuiness 0-4, E McGuinness 0-3, J Murphy 1-0, R Campbell 0-2, R Courtney 0-1, N Lennon 0-1, S Campbell 0-1, C McPolin 0-1.

=== Ulster final ===
16 November 2019 Final	Eoghan Rua	1-16 - 0-11	Newry Shamrocks	Eoghan Rua Park
	SL McGoldrick 0-11, D Mooney 1-0, R Mooney 0-2, T Magee 0-1, N Holly 0-1, D McGolrick 0-1.		A McGuinness 0-5, C McPolin 0-3, S Campbell 0-1, N Lennon 0-1, E McGuinness 0-1.

== All-Ireland Junior Club Hurling Championship ==
=== All-Ireland quarter-final ===
24 November 2019 Quarter-final	Eoghan Rua	3-19 - 0-07	John Mitchels	Celtic Park
	SL McGoldrick 1-9.	Report

=== All-Ireland semi-finals ===
4 January 2020 Semi-final	Eoghan Rua	1-12 - 3-18	Conahy Shamrocks	Grattan Park
	SL McGoldrick (0-9, 6f, 1 '65'), R Mooney (1-0), N Holly (0-1), D Mooney (0-1), A Rafferty (0-1).	Report	J Bergin (2-10, 5f), K Mooney (1-1), E Delaney (0-3, 2f), T Rice (0-2), E Cahill (0-1), T Phelan (0-1).	Referee: N Wall (Cork)

5 January 2020 Semi-final	Mícheál Breathnach	1-15 - 1-26 (aet)	Russell Rovers	FitzGerald Park
	R Ó Beoláin (1-2), B Ó Conghaile (0-4), M Ó Conghaile (0-7, 0-5 frees, 0-1 65), R Mac Donnacha and E Ó Conghaile (0-1 each).	Report	B Hartnett (0-12, 0-6 frees), J Kennefick (1-1), K Walsh and K Moynihan (0-4 each), L Duggan Murray (0-3), C Ruddy and K Tattan (0-1 each).	Referee: K Brady (Louth)

=== All-Ireland final ===
18 January 2020 Final	Conahy Shamrocks	0-22 - 0-15	Russell Rovers	Croke Park
	J Bergin 0-12 (8fs), K Mooney 0-4, D Brennan 0-2, B Murphy 0-1, E Cahill 0-1, T Phelan 0-1, E Delaney 0-1.	Report	J Beausang 0-5 (4fs, 165), B Hartnett 0-4 (2fs), L Duggan-Murray 0-2, D O'Brien 0-1, R Walsh 0-1 (f), D Moynihan 0-1 (f), K Walsh 0-1.	Referee: S Stack (Dublin)

== Championship statistics ==
=== Top scorers ===
Overall

Rank	Player	Club	Tally	Total	Matches	Average
1	Seán Leo McGoldrick	Eoghan Rua	1-42	45	5	9.00
2	James Bergin	Conahy Shamrocks	4-27	39	3	13.00
3	Joe O'Brien	Clonguish Gaels	6-19	37	3	12.33
4	Jack Hobbs	Ballygarrett-Réalt na Mara	1-28	31	3	10.33
5	Kieran Mooney	Conahy Shamrocks	2-23	29	5	5.80
6	Josh Beausang	Russell Rovers	1-24	27	3	9.00
7	Brian Hartnett	Russell Rovers	1-18	21	4	5.25
8	Aaron Amond	Naomh Bríd	3-10	19	2	9.50
9	Tom Phelan	Conahy Shamrocks	2-11	17	5	3.40
10	Luke Duggan-Murray	Russell Rovers	2-08	14	4	3.50
10	Calum O'Sullivan	Clann na nGael	1-11	14	2	7.00
10	Kevin Regan	Cullion	1-11	14	2	7.00

In a single game

Rank	Player	Club	Tally	Total	Opposition
1	Joe O'Brien	Clonguish Gaels	4-05	17	Barndarrig
2	James Bergin	Conahy Shamrocks	2-10	16	Eoghan Rua
3	Joe O'Brien	Clonguish Gaels	2-08	14	Mountmellick
4	Aaron Amond	Naomh Bríd	1-09	12	Naomh Moninne
4	Jack Hobbs	Ballygarrett-Réalt na Mara	1-09	12	Conahy Shamrocks
4	Seán Leo McGoldrick	Eoghan Rua	1-09	12	John Mitchels
4	Tony O'Kelly-Lynch	Naomh Eoin	0-12	12	Carrick
4	Brian Hartnett	Russell Rovers	0-12	12	Mícheál Breathnach
4	James Bergin	Conahy Shamrocks	0-12	12	Russell Rovers
10	James Bergin	Conahy Shamrocks	2-05	11	Ballygarrett-Réalt na Mara
10	James Hilliard	Mountmellick	1-08	11	Clonguish Gaels
10	Josh Beausang	Russell Rovers	0-11	11	Kilgarvan
10	Seán Leo McGoldrick	Eoghan Rua	0-11	11	Newry Shamrocks
