= 2015 All-Ireland Senior Hurling Championship =

Championship details
- Dates: 3 May — 6 September 2015
- Teams: 14

All-Ireland champions
- Winning team: Kilkenny (36th win)
- Captain: Joey Holden
- Manager: Brian Cody

All-Ireland Finalists
- Losing team: Galway
- Captain: Andy Smith; David Collins
- Manager: Anthony Cunningham

Provincial champions
- Munster: Tipperary
- Leinster: Kilkenny
- Ulster: Antrim
- Connacht: Not Played

Championship statistics
- No. matches played: 28
- Top Scorer: Joe Canning (5–55)
- Player of the Year: T.J. Reid
- All-Star Team: See here

The 2015 All-Ireland Senior Hurling Championship was the 129th staging of the All-Ireland championship since its establishment by the Gaelic Athletic Association in 1887. The draw for the 2015 fixtures took place on 9 October 2014 live on RTÉ2. The championship began on 3 May 2015 and ended on 6 September 2015.

Kilkenny were the defending champions and successfully retained the title following a 1–22 to 1–18 defeat of Galway.

== Team changes ==
=== To Championship ===
Promoted from the Christy Ring Cup

- None

=== From Championship ===
Relegated to the Christy Ring Cup

- London

== Teams ==
=== General information ===
Fourteen counties will compete in the All-Ireland Senior Hurling Championship: nine teams in the Leinster Senior Hurling Championship and five teams in the Munster Senior Hurling Championship.

County	Last provincial title	Last championship title	Position in 2014 Championship	Appearance
Antrim	2014	—	Round 1	
Carlow	—	—	Group Stage (Leinster SHC)	
Clare	1998	2013	Round 1	
Cork	2014	2005	Semi-finals	
Dublin	2013	1938	Quarter-finals	
Galway	2012	1988	Round 1	
Kilkenny	2014	2014	Champions	
Laois	1949	1915	Round 1	
Limerick	2013	1973	Semi-finals	
Offaly	1995	1998	Round 2	
Tipperary	2012	2010	Runners-up	
Waterford	2007	1959	Round 2	
Westmeath	—	—	Group Stage (Leinster SHC)	
Wexford	2004	1996	Quarter-finals	

=== Personal and kits ===
Team	Colours	Sponsor	Captain(s)	Vice-captain(s)	Manager(s)
Team	Colours	Sponsor	Captain(s)	Vice-captain(s)	Manager(s)	Antrim	Creagh Concrete Northern Property	Neil McManus	Kevin Ryan
Carlow		Dan Morrissey Ltd.	Séamus Murphy; Alan Corcoran		Pat English
Clare		Pat O'Donnell	Patrick Donnellan; Cian Dillon	Conor McGrath; Patrick O'Connor	Davy Fitzgerald
Cork		Chill Insurance	Anthony Nash		Jimmy Barry-Murphy
Dublin		AIG	Liam Rushe; Peter Kelly		Ger Cunningham
Galway		Supermac's	David Collins		Anthony Cunningham
Kilkenny		Glanbia	Joey Holden		Brian Cody
Laois		MW Hire Services	Joe Fitzpatrick		Séamus Plunkett; Ger Cunningham
Limerick		Sporting Limerick	Donal O'Grady	Paudie O'Brien	T. J. Ryan
Offaly		Carroll Cuisine	Dan Currams		Brian Whelahan
Tipperary		Intersport/Elverys	Brendan Maher	Pádraic Maher	Eamon O'Shea
Waterford		3	Kevin Moran	Pauric Mahony; Darragh Fives	Derek McGrath
Westmeath		Renault	Aonghus Clarke		Michael Ryan
Wexford		Gain	Matthew O'Hanlon		Liam Dunne

== Summary ==
=== Championships ===
Level on Pyramid	Competition	Champions	Runners up
Tier 1	2015 All-Ireland Senior Hurling Championship	Kilkenny	Galway
Tier 1 (Leinster)	2015 Leinster Senior Hurling Championship	Kilkenny	Galway
Tier 1 (Munster)	2015 Munster Senior Hurling Championship	Tipperary	Waterford
Tier 1 (Ulster)	2015 Ulster Senior Hurling Championship	Antrim	Down
Tier 2	2015 Christy Ring Cup	Kerry	Derry
Tier 3	2015 Nicky Rackard Cup	Roscommon	Armagh
Tier 4	2015 Lory Meagher Cup	Fermanagh	Sligo

== Changes from 2014 Championship ==
Penalties must now be struck on or behind the 20 metre line and only the goalkeeper is allowed on the goal line. Previously 3 defenders were allowed.

If a foul has been committed the referee can allow play to continue for up to 5 seconds if he considers it to be to the advantage of the offended team. Previously there was no advantage rule in hurling.

== Leinster Senior Hurling Championship ==
=== Group Stage ===
Pos	Team	Pld	W	D	L	SF	SA	SD	Pts	Qualification
1	Laois	3	2	0	1	5–59	7–48	+5	4	Advance to quarter-finals
2	Westmeath	3	2	0	1	4–57	3–44	+16	4	Advance to quarter-finals
3	Carlow	3	1	0	2	5–49	4–47	+5	2	
4	Antrim	3	1	0	2	6–35	6–61	−26	2	Relegated to Christy Ring Cup

The winners of this year's Christy Ring Cup are promoted in their place to the qualifier group of next year's Leinster Championship.

Matches

3 May 2015; 15:30; Round 1	Westmeath	2–19 – 2–17	Carlow	Cusack Park; Referee: J Keenan (Wicklow)
3 May 2015; 15:30; Round 1	N O'Brien 0–7 (2fs), A Devine 1–3, B Murtagh 1–2, D McNicholas 0–3, E Price, D Clinton 0–2 each.	Report	M Kavanagh 1–7 (4fs, 2 '65s'), Seamus Murphy 1–2, Sean Murphy 0–3, C Wall 0–2, E Coady, P Coady, J M Nolan 0–1 each.	Cusack Park; Referee: J Keenan (Wicklow)

3 May 2015; 15:30; Round 1	Antrim	5–17 – 3–22	Laois	Páirc Mac Uílín; Referee: P O'Dwyer (Carlow)
3 May 2015; 15:30; Round 1	C Clarke (2–7, 1–0 pen, 0-5f, 0–1 ’65), C Johnson (2–1), N McManus (1–2), P Shiels (0–3, 1f), N McAuley (0–1), M Bradley (0–1), E Campbell (0–1), D Murphy (0–1).	Report	Z Keenan (1–9, 1–0 pen, 0-7f), T Fitzgerald (1–1), B Conroy (1–0), PJ Scully (0–3), R King (0–3), W Hyland (0–3), P Purcell (0–1), J Campion (0–1), C Dwyer (0–1).	Páirc Mac Uílín; Referee: P O'Dwyer (Carlow)

10 May 2015; 15:30; Round 2	Westmeath	1–21 – 0–7	Antrim	Cusack Park; Attendance: 1,300; Referee: F Horgan
10 May 2015; 15:30; Round 2	N O’Brien (0–8, 5f), A Devine (1–3), R Greville (0–4), D McNicholas (0–3, 1sl), C Boyle (0–2), B Murtagh (0–1).	Report	C Clarke (0-2f), Ciaran Johnson (0–2), P Shiels (0–2, 1f), E Campbell (0–1).	Cusack Park; Attendance: 1,300; Referee: F Horgan

10 May 2015; 15:30; Round 2	Carlow	1–14 – 1–17	Laois	Netwatch Cullen park Attendance: 2,000; Referee: D Kirwan
10 May 2015; 15:30; Round 2	M Kavanagh (0-7f), E Byrne (1–1), D Byrne (0–2), D English (0–2, 1f), J Kavanagh (0–1), J M Nolan (0–1).	Report	Z Keenan (0–10, 9f), B Conroy (1–3), C Dwyer (0–2), PJ Scully (0–1), S Maher (0–1).	Netwatch Cullen park Attendance: 2,000; Referee: D Kirwan

24 May 2015; Round 3	Carlow	2–18 – 1–11	Antrim	Netwatch Cullen Park; Attendance: 1,000; Referee: C McAllister (Cork)
24 May 2015; Round 3	P Coady (1–7, 0-5f), Sean Murphy (1–1), J M Nolan (0–3), M Kavanagh (0-2f), J Kavanagh (0–2); E Byrne (0–2), M Brennan (0–1).	Report	Ciaran Johnston (1–4, 0-3f), C Clarke (0–3, 2f), O McFadden (0–1), P Shiels (0–1,'65), M Bradley (0–1), C McCann (0–1).	Netwatch Cullen Park; Attendance: 1,000; Referee: C McAllister (Cork)

24 May 2015; Round 3	Laois	1–20 – 1–17	Westmeath	O'Moore Park; Referee: A Kelly
24 May 2015; Round 3	Z Keenan (0–10, 7f, 1sl), C Dwyer (1–3), R King (0–3), P Purcell (0–1), W Hyland (0–1), S Maher (0–1), D Peacock (0–1).	Report	B Murtagh (1–2, 0-2f), R Greville (0–3), D McNicholas (0–3), N O’Brien (0–3, 2f), A Devine (0–2), C Boyle (0–2), N Dowdall (0–1), J Boyle (0–1).	O'Moore Park; Referee: A Kelly

=== Knockout stage ===
Quarter-finals
Galway	0–20 R: 5–19
Dublin	1–17 R: 1–18
Offaly	0–21
Laois	0–29
Westmeath	1–16
Wexford	1–24

Semi-final
Galway	3–28
Laois	1–14
Kilkenny	5–25
Wexford	0–16

Leinster Final
Kilkenny	1–25
Galway	2–15

== Munster Senior Hurling Championship ==
Quarter-finals
Clare	2–15
Limerick	1–19

Semi-finals
Limerick	1–16
Tipperary	4–23
Cork	1–20
Waterford	3–19

Munster Final
Tipperary	0–21
Waterford	0–16

=== Matches ===
24 May 2015; 16:00; Quarter-final	Clare	2–15 – 1–19	Limerick	Semple Stadium; Attendance: 21,493; Referee: C Lyons (Cork)
24 May 2015; 16:00; Quarter-final	C Ryan (0–7, 5 frees); A Cunningham (2–1); J Conlon, T Kelly (0–2 each); S Golden, D Reidy, S O'Donnell (0–1 each).	Report	S Dowling (0–11, 10 frees, 1 65); G Mulcahy (1–1); C Lynch (0–3); P O'Brien, S O'Brien, T Condon, J Fitzgibbon (0–1 each).	Semple Stadium; Attendance: 21,493; Referee: C Lyons (Cork)

7 June 2015; 16:00; Semi-final	Cork	1–21 – 3–19	Waterford	Semple Stadium; Attendance: 21,047; Referee: B Kelly (Westmeath)
7 June 2015; 16:00; Semi-final	P Horgan (1–7, goal and six points frees), P Cronin (0–5), A Cadogan (0–2), D McCarthy (0–1, one 65), A Walsh (0–1), L O’Farrell (0–1), D Kearney (0–1), M Ellis (0–1), C Lehane (0–1), B Cooper (0–1).	Report	M Shanahan (1–9, seven frees, one 65), T Devine (1–0), J Dillon (1–0), K Moran (0–2), Stephen Bennett (0–2), Shane Bennett (0–2), A Gleeson (0–1, free), T de Búrca (0–1), C Dunford (0–1), P Curran (0–1).	Semple Stadium; Attendance: 21,047; Referee: B Kelly (Westmeath)

21 June 2015; 16:00; Semi-final	Limerick	1–16 – 4–23	Tipperary	Gaelic Grounds; Attendance: 31,488; Referee: B Gavin (Offaly)
21 June 2015; 16:00; Semi-final	S Dowling (1–7), D Hannon (0–3), D Breen (0–1), G O'Mahony (0–1), G Mulcahy (0–2), S O'Brien (0–1), D O'Grady (0–1).	Report	S Callanan (2–5), J O'Dwyer (0–7), J Forde (1–3), M Breen (1–0), P Maher (0–3), S McGrath (0–2), N O'Meara (0–1), J Woodlock (0–1), S Bourke (0–1).	Gaelic Grounds; Attendance: 31,488; Referee: B Gavin (Offaly)

=== Final ===
12 July 2015; 16:00; Final	Waterford	0–16 – 0–21	Tipperary	Semple Stadium; Attendance: 43,084; Referee: James Owens (Wexford)
12 July 2015; 16:00; Final	M Shanahan (0–8), S Fives (0–2), K Moran (0–2), A Gleeson (0–2), C Dunford (0–1), P Curran (0–1).	Report	S Callanan (0–6), J O'Dwyer (0–5), N O'Meara (0–3), J Forde (0–2), Patrick Maher (0–2), M Breen (0–1), L Corbett (0–1), S Bourke (0–1).	Semple Stadium; Attendance: 43,084; Referee: James Owens (Wexford)

== All-Ireland Qualifiers ==
=== Round 1 ===
The teams beaten in the Leinster and Munster quarter-finals and semi-finals of the provincial championships play each other. The draw was held on 22 June.

4 July 2015; 19:00; Round 1	Clare	3–26 – 0–15	Offaly	Cusack Park (Ennis); Attendance: 14,268; Referee: J Keenan (Wicklow)
4 July 2015; 19:00; Round 1	T Kelly 0–8 (2f), C McGrath 1–4, J Conlon 1–2, Colin Ryan (2f) Conor Ryan, D Honan 0–3, S O'Donnell 1–0, S Golden 0–2, P O'Connor 0–1.	Report	S Dooley 0–6 (6f), S Kinsella 0–4, S Cleary 0–2, P Murphy, J Mulrooney, J Bergin 0–1.	Cusack Park (Ennis); Attendance: 14,268; Referee: J Keenan (Wicklow)

4 July 2015; 19:00; Round 1	Laois	0–19 – 4–17	Dublin	O'Moore Park; Attendance: 5,000 est. Referee: J Ryan (Tipperary)
4 July 2015; 19:00; Round 1	Z Keenan (0-06, 5f), W Hyland (0-04), C Dwyer (0-03), J Fitzpatrick (0-01), M Whelan (0-01), T Delaney (0-01), S Maher (0-01), J Campion (0-01), N Foyle (0-01).	Report	M Schutte (2-01), C Keaney (1-03), P Ryan (0-05, 4f), E Dillon (0-04), D O’Callaghan (1-00), S Barrett (0-01), J McCaffrey (0-01), R O’Dwyer (0-01), D Plunkett (0-01).	O'Moore Park; Attendance: 5,000 est. Referee: J Ryan (Tipperary)

4 July 2015; 19:00; Round 1	Wexford	0–20 – 2–22	Cork	Innovate Wexford Park; Attendance: 11,800; Referee: A Kelly (Galway)
4 July 2015; 19:00; Round 1	I. Byrne 0–12 (0–10 fs); D. Redmond, 0–3; H. Kehoe, 0–2; K. Foley, P. Morris, C. McDonald 0–1 each.	Report	P. Horgan 0–9 (0–6 fs), C. Lehane 1–6; S. Harnedy 1–1; B. Lawton, B. Cooper 0–2 each; D. Cahalane, P. Cronin 0–1 each.	Innovate Wexford Park; Attendance: 11,800; Referee: A Kelly (Galway)

5 July 2015; 14:00; Round 1	Westmeath	1–12 – 4–15	Limerick	Cusack Park (Mullingar); Attendance: 2,700; Referee: P O’Dwyer (Carlow)
5 July 2015; 14:00; Round 1	B Murtagh 0–6 (2f), C Boyle 1–2, D McNicholas 0–2, E Corrigan 0–1, A Devine 0–1.	Report	S Dowling 1–3 (0-1f), K Downes 1–2, P Brown 1–1, S Tobin 0–3, D Hannon 0–3 (1f, 1’65), A Breen 1–0, G Mulcahy 0–2, T O’Brien 0–1.	Cusack Park (Mullingar); Attendance: 2,700; Referee: P O’Dwyer (Carlow)

=== Round 2 ===
The four winners of Round 1 play in two games. The draw was held on 6 July.

11 July 2015; 17:00; Round 2	Limerick	1–16 – 1–17	Dublin	Semple Stadium; Attendance: 25,245; Referee: C McAllister (Dublin)
11 July 2015; 17:00; Round 2	S Tobin (0–6, 4f), D Breen (1–1), S Dowling (0–4, 2f, 2'65), D Hannon (0–2, 1sl), G Mulcahy (0–2), P O’Brien (0–1), K Downes (0–1).	Report	P Ryan (0–12, 6f), D O’Callaghan (1–0), D Plunkett (0–2), R O’Dwyer (0–1), M Schutte (0–1), C Boland (0–1).	Semple Stadium; Attendance: 25,245; Referee: C McAllister (Dublin)

11 July 2015; 19:00; Round 2	Clare	0–17 – 0–20	Cork	Semple Stadium; Attendance: 25,245; Referee: B Kelly (Westmeath)
11 July 2015; 19:00; Round 2	T Kelly (0–5, 1f), C McGrath (0–3), Colin Ryan (0-2f), S O’Donnell (0–2), D McInerney (0–1), Conor Ryan (0–1), S Golden (0–1), D Honan (0–1), C Galvin (0–1).	Report	P Horgan (0–8, 5f), S Harnedy (0–2), P Cronin (0–2), C Lehane (0–2), A Walsh (0–1), C Murphy (0–1), B Cooper (0–1), A Cadogan (0–1), J Coughlan (0–1), P O’Sullivan (0–1).	Semple Stadium; Attendance: 25,245; Referee: B Kelly (Westmeath)

== All-Ireland Senior Hurling Championship ==
=== Bracket ===
Quarter-finals
Waterford	2–21
Dublin	1–19
Galway	2–28
Cork	0–22

Semi-finals
Kilkenny	1–21
Waterford	0–18
Tipperary	3–16
Galway	0–26

Final
Kilkenny	1–22
Galway	1–18

=== All-Ireland quarter-finals ===
The beaten finalists in the Leinster and Munster championships play the winners of Round 2 in two "quarter-finals".

26 July 2015; 14:00; Quarter-final	Waterford	2–21 – 1–19	Dublin	Semple Stadium; Attendance: 33,150; Referee: J Ryan (Tipperary)
26 July 2015; 14:00; Quarter-final	M Shanahan (1–12, 0–8 frees, 0–2 ’65); A Gleeson (0–4, 0–1 sc); S Bennett (1–0); C Dunford, K Moran (0–2 each), J Dillon (0–1).	Report	P Schutte (1–2), P Ryan (0–5, 0–5 frees); D O’Callaghan, D Sutcliffe (0–3); D Treacy (0–2, 0–1 ’65), R O’Dwyer (0–2 each); C Crummey, N McMorrow (0–1 each).	Semple Stadium; Attendance: 33,150; Referee: J Ryan (Tipperary)

26 July 2015; 16:00; Quarter-final	Galway	2–28 – 0–22	Cork	Semple Stadium; Attendance: 33,150; Referee: J Ownes (Wexford)
26 July 2015; 16:00; Quarter-final	C Mannion (0–7); J Glynn, C Whelan (1–2 each); J Canning (0–5, 2 frees, 1 sideline, 1 65); J Flynn (0–3); A Harte (0–2); David Burke, C Donnellan (0–2 each); A Smith, J Cooney, N Healy (0–1 each).	Report	P Horgan (0–9, 6 frees, 1 65); C Lehane, S Harnedy (0–3 each); D Kearney (0–2); C Murphy, B Lawton, P O'Sullivan, A Cadogan, A Walsh (0–1 each).	Semple Stadium; Attendance: 33,150; Referee: J Ownes (Wexford)

=== All-Ireland semi-finals ===
The Leinster and Munster provincial champions play the winners of the two quarter-finals.

9 August 2015; 15:45; Semi-final	Kilkenny	1–21 – 0–18	Waterford	Croke Park; Attendance: 41,112; Referee: B Gavin (Offaly)
9 August 2015; 15:45; Semi-final	T. J. Reid (1–9, 0–6 frees), R Hogan (0–5), G Aylward (0–4), C Buckley, E Larkin, M Fennelly (0–1 each).	Report	M Shanahan (0–9, 6 frees, 1 65), C Dunford (0–4), A Gleeson (1 sideline) (0–3), S Bennett, K Moran (0–1 each).	Croke Park; Attendance: 41,112; Referee: B Gavin (Offaly)

16 August 2015; 16:00; Semi-final	Tipperary	3–16 – 0–26	Galway	Croke Park; Attendance: 58,495; Referee: B Kelly (Westmeath)
16 August 2015; 16:00; Semi-final	Seamus Callanan (3–9, 0–3 frees, 0–1 penalty, 0–1 '65); John O'Dwyer (0–2, 0–1 free); Jason Forde, Brendan Maher, Patrick Maher, Conor O'Mahony, Noel McGrath (0–1)	Report	Joe Canning (0–10, 0–6 frees, 0–1 '65, 0–1 sideline); Cathal Mannion (0–5); Jason Flynn (0–5, 0–1 free); David Burke, Conor Whelan (0–2); Shane Moloney, Andy Smith (0–1)	Croke Park; Attendance: 58,495; Referee: B Kelly (Westmeath)

=== All-Ireland Final ===
6 September 2015; 15:30; Final	Kilkenny	1–22 – 1–18	Galway	Croke Park; Attendance: 82,300; Referee: James Owens (Wexford)
6 September 2015; 15:30; Final	TJ Reid (1–7, 5f, 2 65s), G Aylward (0–3), W Walsh (0–2), E Larkin (0–2), M Fennelly (0–2), C Fennelly (0–2), R Hogan (0–2), P Walsh (0–1), C Fogarty (0–1).	Report	J Canning (1–8, 1-5f), J Flynn (0-04, 3f), D Collins (0–2), C Whelan (0–2), C Donnellan (0–1), D Burke (0–1).	Croke Park; Attendance: 82,300; Referee: James Owens (Wexford)

== Statistics ==
- All scores correct as of September 9, 2015

=== Scoring ===
- First goal of the championship:
  - Neil McManus for Antrim against Laois (3 May 2015)
- Widest winning margin: 24 points
  - Kilkenny 5–25 – 0–16 Wexford (Leinster semi-final)
- Most goals in a match: 8
  - Antrim 5–17 – 3–22 Laois (Leinster group stage)
- Most points in a match: 50
  - Laois 0-29 – 0-21 Offaly (Leinster quarter-final)
  - Galway 2–28 – 0–22 Cork (All-Ireland quarter-final)
- Most goals by one team in a match: 5
  - Antrim 5–17 – 3–22 Laois (Leinster group stage)
  - Galway 5–19 – 1–18 Dublin (Leinster quarter-final replay)
  - Kilkenny 5–25 – 0–16 Wexford (Leinster semi-final)
- Highest aggregate score: 63
  - Antrim 5–17 – 3–22 Laois (Leinster group stage)
- Lowest aggregate score: 31
  - Westmeath 1–21 – 1–7 Antrim (Leinster group stage)
- Most goals scored by a losing team: 3
  - Antrim 5–17 – 3–22 Laois (Leinster group stage)
  - Galway 0–26 – 3–16 Tipperary (All-Ireland semi-final)

=== Top scorers ===
Overall

Rank	Player	County	Tally	Total	Matches	Average
1	Joe Canning	Galway	5–55	70	7	10.00
2	Zane Keenan	Laois	1–51	54	6	9.00
3	Maurice Shanahan	Waterford	2–38	44	4	11.00
3	T. J. Reid	Kilkenny	4–32	44	4	11.00
5	Patrick Horgan	Cork	1–33	36	4	9.00
6	Séamus Callanan	Tipperary	5–20	35	3	11.67
7	Ian Byrne	Wexford	1–30	33	3	11.00
8	Shane Dowling	Limerick	2–25	31	4	7.75
9	Paul Ryan	Dublin	0–29	29	4	7.25
9	Cathal Mannion	Galway	3–20	29	7	4.14
11	Jason Flynn	Galway	1–22	25	6	4.17
12	Brendan Murtagh	Westmeath	3–15	24	5	4.80
12	Ger Aylward	Kilkenny	3–15	24	4	6.00
14	Marty Kavanagh	Carlow	1–16	19	3	6.33
14	Richie Hogan	Kilkenny	1–16	19	4	4.75
15	Niall O'Brien	Westmeath	0–18	18	4	4.50
15	Charles Dwyer	Laois	1–15	18	6	3.00
15	Ciarán Clarke	Antrim	2–12	18	3	6.00

Single game

Rank	Player	County	Tally	Total	Opposition
1	Joe Canning	Galway	1–15	18	Laois
1	Séamus Callanan	Tipperary	3-09	18	Galway
3	Maurice Shanahan	Waterford	1–12	15	Dublin
4	Ger Aylward	Kilkenny	3–5	14	Wexford
5	Ciarán Clarke	Antrim	2–7	13	Laois
6	Ian Byrne	Wexford	0–12	12	Cork
6	Paul Ryan	Dublin	0–12	12	Limerick
6	Zane Keenan	Laois	1–9	12	Antrim
6	T.J. Reid	Kilkenny	1–9	12	Waterford
6	T.J. Reid	Kilkenny	1–9	12	Galway
6	Maurice Shanahan	Waterford	1–9	12	Cork
6	Cathal Mannion	Galway	3–3	12	Dublin
13	Shane Dowling	Limerick	0–11	11	Clare
13	Zane Keenan	Laois	0–11	11	Offaly
13	Shane Dooley	Offaly	0–11	11	Laois
13	Ian Byrne	Wexford	0–11	11	Kilkenny
13	David Treacy	Dublin	0–11	11	Galway
13	Joe Canning	Galway	1-08	11	Kilkenny
13	Séamus Callanan	Tipperary	2–5	11	Limerick

=== Clean sheets ===
Rank	Goalkeeper	County	Clean sheets
1	Colm Callanan	Galway	2
1	Darren Gleeson	Tipperary	2
1	Patrick Kelly	Clare	2
1	Anthony Nash	Cork	2
1	Eoin Murphy	Kilkenny	2

== Miscellaneous ==
- Galway record their first ever championship defeat of Dublin.
- Laois secure their first championship victory over Offaly since 1972.

=== Updated Roll of Honour ===
- Kilkenny – 36 (2015)
- Cork – 30 (2005)
- Tipperary – 26 (2010)
- Limerick – 7 (1973)
- Dublin – 6 (1938)
- Wexford – 6 (1996)
- Galway – 4 (1988)
- Offaly – 4 (1998)
- Clare – 4 (2013)
- Waterford – 2 (1959)
- Laois – 1 (1915)
- London – 1 (1901)
- Kerry – 1 (1891)

== Attendances ==
Highest attendances:

- Kilkenny 1–22 – 1–18 Galway (Croke Park) – 82,300
- Tipperary 3–16 – 0–26 Galway (Croke Park) – 58,495
- Waterford 0–16 – 0–21 Tipperary (Semple Stadium) – 43,084
- Kilkenny 1–21 – 0–18 Waterford (Croke Park) – 41,112
- Galway 2–28 – 0–22 Cork (Semple Stadium) – 33,150

Total attendance: 567,622

Average attendance: 25,801

== Broadcasting ==
These matches were broadcast live on television in Ireland

Round	RTÉ	Sky Sports
Munster Championship	Clare vs Limerick; Cork vs Waterford; Limerick vs Tipperary; Waterford vs Tipperary	
Leinster Championship	Galway vs Dublin; Galway vs Dublin (replay); Kilkenny vs Wexford; Kilkenny vs Galway	Galway vs Laois
Qualifiers	Limerick vs Dublin	Wexford vs Cork; Clare vs Cork
Quarter-finals	Galway vs Cork; Waterford vs Dublin	
Semi-finals	Kilkenny vs Waterford; Tipperary vs Galway	Kilkenny vs Waterford; Tipperary vs Galway
Final	Kilkenny vs Galway	Kilkenny vs Galway

== Awards ==
Sunday Game Team of the Year

The Sunday Game team of the year was picked on 6 September, which was the night of the final. The panel consisting of Donal Óg Cusack, Henry Shefflin, Anthony Daly, Michael Duignan, Ger Loughnane, Liam Sheedy and Cyril Farrell unanimously selected Kilkenny's TJ Reid as the Sunday game player of the year.

- Colm Callanan (Galway)
- Paul Murphy (Kilkenny)
- Joey Holden (Kilkenny)
- Cathal Barrett (Tipperary)
- Daithí Burke (Galway)
- Tadhg de Búrca (Waterford)
- Cillian Buckley (Kilkenny)
- Michael Fennelly (Kilkenny)
- David Burke (Galway)
- Jonathan Glynn (Galway)
- Richie Hogan (Kilkenny)
- TJ Reid (Kilkenny)
- Ger Aylward (Kilkenny)
- Seamus Callanan (Tipperary)
- Maurice Shanahan (Waterford)

All Star Team of the Year

On 5 November, the 2015 All Star Award winners were announced with the awards ceremony being held on 6 November in the National Convention Centre in Dublin. All Ireland champions Kilkenny have seven award winners with runners-up Galway receiving four awards. Winning an award for the first time were Colm Callanan, Joey Holden, Daithi Burke, Tadhg de Burca, Cathal Mannion, Ger Aylward and Maurice Shanahan. T. J. Reid of Kilkenny was named as the All Stars Hurler of the Year with Tadhg de Búrca of Waterford being named as the All Stars Young Hurler of the Year.

Pos.	Player	Team	Appearances
GK	Colm Callanan	Galway	1
RCB	Paul Murphy	Kilkenny	4
FB	Joey Holden	Kilkenny	1
LCB	Noel Connors	Waterford	2
RWB	Daithí Burke	Galway	1
CB	Tadhg de Búrca^{YHOTY}	Waterford	1
LWB	Cillian Buckley	Kilkenny	2
MD	Michael Fennelly	Kilkenny	3
MD	David Burke	Galway	2
RWF	Cathal Mannion	Galway	1
CF	Richie Hogan	Kilkenny	3
LWF	T. J. Reid^{HOTY}	Kilkenny	3
RCF	Ger Aylward	Kilkenny	1
FF	Séamus Callanan	Tipperary	2
LCF	Maurice Shanahan	Waterford	1

== See also ==
- 2015 Ulster Senior Hurling Championship
- 2015 Christy Ring Cup (Tier 2)
- 2015 Nicky Rackard Cup (Tier 3)
- 2015 Lory Meagher Cup (Tier 4)
