= 2015 Leinster Senior Hurling Championship final =

2015 Leinster Senior Hurling final
- Event: 2015 Leinster Senior Hurling Championship
Galway	Kilkenny
2-15	1-25
- Date: 5 July 2015
- Venue: Croke Park, Dublin
- Man of the Match: TJ Reid
- Referee: James Mcgrath (Westmeath)
- Attendance: 32,954
- Weather: Mostly cloudy with some sunny spells

The 2015 Leinster Senior Hurling Championship final, the deciding game of the 2015 Leinster Senior Hurling Championship, was a hurling match played on 5 July 2015 at Croke Park, Dublin, contested by Galway and Kilkenny. Kilkenny claimed their 70th Leinster crown by defeating The Tribesmen on a scoreline of 1-25 to 2-15.

== Match details ==
Kilkenny were on top for the majority of the game. The first half was a very tough battle as both teams showed intensity that the 2015 All-Ireland Senior Hurling Championship was missing up to that point. The Cats got the first goal of the game on 28 minutes, through an on fire TJ Reid after a Ger Aylward pass was deflected into his hands. Galway seemed to be letting the game slipping away from them when 2 minutes later Joe Canning scored one of the best goals ever at Croke Park after he caught a high ball, tuned instantly on the run before firing the ball into the net. The score at half time read Kilkenny 1-11 to Galways 1-08.

A minute into the second half Galway found the net once again, this time through forward Jason Flynn. It seemed like from here it would be game on but Kilkenny kept cool heads and kept stretching their lead through some excellent point taking, particularly from Ger Aylward and Eoin Larkin. Kilkenny ran out comfortable seven point winners in the end. Captain Joey Holden lifted the Bob O'Keeffe Trophy on another successful day for The Cats.

5 July 2015
16:00
Final

Galway	2-15 - 1-25	Kilkenny
E Murphy; P Murphy, J Holden, J Tyrrell; P Walsh, K Joyce, C Buckley; C Fogarty (0-01), W Walsh (0-02); R Hogan (0-04), J Power, C Fennelly (0-02); G Aylward (0-03), TJ Reid (1-09, 0-05f, 0-01'65), E Larkin (0-04) Subs: S Prendergast for Tyrrell (50 mins), M Kelly for Power (58), M Ruth for Fennelly (71).	Report	Galway: C Callanan; J Hanbury, P Mannion, J Coen; F Moore (0-01), I Tannian, Daithí Burke; A Smith, A Harte; David Burke (0-01), C Donnellan (0-03), J Glynn (0-01); C Mannion (0-01), J Canning (1-08, 0-07f), D Glennon. Subs: J Flynn (1-00) for Glennon (27 mins), J Cooney for Harte (39), P Brehony for David Burke (59), N Healy for C Mannion (62), P Killeen for Hanbury (64).

Croke Park
Attendance: 32,954
Referee: James Mcgrath (Westmeath)

Galway	Kilkenny
