= Kevin Hartnett =

Irish hurler

Personal information
- Native name: Caoimhghin Ó hAirtneada (Irish)
- Nickname: Screech
- Born: 4 June 1984 (age 42) Shanagarry, County Cork, Ireland
- Occupation: Research engineer
- Height: 5 ft 11 in (180 cm)

Sport
- Sport: Hurling
- Position: Left wing-back
Clubs
- Years: Club
- Russell Rovers; Imokilly; UCC
Club titles
- Cork titles: 0
Inter-county*
Years	County	Apps (scores)
2005-2008	Cork	8 (0-5)
Inter-county titles
- Munster titles: 0
- All-Irelands: 0
- NHL: 0
- All Stars: 0
- *Inter County team apps and scores correct as of 17:08, 6 May 2013.

Kevin Hartnett (born 4 June 1984) is an Irish hurler who played as a left wing-back for the Cork senior team.

Hartnett joined the team during the 2005 National Hurling League and was a regular member of the team until he left the panel after the 2008 championship. During that time he won one All-Ireland medal and two Munster medals as a non-playing substitute.

At club level Hartnett has played with Russell Rovers, divisional side Imokilly and University College Cork.

== Playing career ==
=== Club ===
Hartnett plays hurling with his local club Russell Rovers, who play in the Cork Junior Hurling Championship. He also plays with the University College Cork team in the Cork Senior Hurling Championship. He usually plays on the half-back line or in midfield.

=== Inter-county ===
Hartnett first came to prominence on the inter-county scene as a member of the Cork minor hurling team in 2001. He made his debut when he came on as a substitute in a Munster quarter-final defeat of Waterford before later starting at midfield in the provincial decider. Tipperary were the winners by 1–12 to 1–6, however, Cork remained in the championship and reached the All-Ireland final via the back-door. Galway provided the opposition on that occasion, however, a 2–10 to 1–8 score line secured a victory for Cork and an All-Ireland medal for Hartnett.

By 2005 Hartnett was a regular member of the Cork under-21 team. After back-to-back defeats by Tipperary in the provincial decider over the previous two years, Cork finally triumphed. A 4–9 to 0–13 victory gave Hartnett a Munster medal in that grade.

Hartnett was also called up to the Cork intermediate hurling team. He won a Munster medal in this grade in 2003 following a 2–12 to 0–11 defeat of Waterford. He later lined out in the All-Ireland final with Kilkenny providing the opposition. In a classic game of hurling both sides were still level at the full-time whistle. There was little to separate the sides in a period of extra-time, however, Cork narrowly emerged victorious by 1–21 to 0-23.

After being deemed ineligible for the team the following year, Hartnett was back with the intermediate side in 2005. A 2–17 to 2–11 defeat of Tipperary gave him a second Munster medal in that grade.

In 2006 Hartnett collected a third Munster medal following a 2–18 to 2–13 defeat of Tipperary. The subsequent All-Ireland decider saw Cork face Kilkenny. A narrow 3–15 to 1–18 victory gave Hartnett a second All-Ireland medal.

By this stage Hartnett had already joined the Cork senior team. He made his competitive debut when he came on as a substitute in a National Hurling League game against Waterford in 2005. He was also included on the Cork panel for the subsequent championship campaign and collected a set of Munster and All-Ireland medals as a non-playing substitute.

In 2006 Hartnett was also an unused substitute as Cork retained the Munster crown but were later defeated by Kilkenny in the All-Ireland decider.

Hartnett made his championship debut when he came on as a substitute in an ill-tempered Munster quarter-final defeat of Clare in 2007. Due to the suspensions of Donal Óg Cusack, Diarmuid O'Sullivan and Seán Óg Ó hAilpín following that game, Hartnett was handed his first championship start for the subsequent Munster semi-final. Cork lost to Waterford on that occasion but Hartnett became a regular member of the team before leaving the panel after the 2008 championship.
