= James Bergin (hurler) =

Irish hurler

Personal information
- Native name: Séamus Ó Beirgin (Irish)
- Born: 26 November 1998 (age 27) Jenkinstown, County Kilkenny, Ireland
- Occupation: Secondary school teacher
- Height: 69 ft 0 in (2,103 cm)

Sport
- Sport: Hurling
- Position: Right corner-forward
Club
- Years: Club
- Conahy Shamrocks
Club titles
- Kilkenny titles: 0
College
- Years: College
- 2017-2021: University College Dublin
College titles
- Fitzgibbon titles: 0
Inter-county
- Years: County
- 2021-: Kilkenny
Inter-county titles
- Leinster titles: 2
- All-Irelands: 0
- NHL: 1
- All Stars: 0

James Bergin (born 26 November 1998) is an Irish hurler who plays for Kilkenny Intermediate Championship club Conahy Shamrocks and at inter-county level with the Kilkenny senior hurling team. He usually lines out as a right corner-forward.

== Career ==
Bergin first came to prominence with the Conahy Shamrocks club when he captained the team to the All-Ireland Junior Club Championship title in 2020. He first appeared at inter-county level as a member of the Kilkenny under-20 team that claimed the Leinster Under-20 Championship title in 2019. Bergin made his senior debut during the 2021 National League.

== Career statistics ==
As of 12 June 2021

Team	Year	National League			Leinster		All-Ireland		Total	
Team	Year	Division	Apps	Score	Apps	Score	Apps	Score	Apps	Score
Kilkenny	2021	Division 1B	5	0-11	0	0-00	0	0-00	5	0-11
Career total			5	0-11	0	0-00	0	0-00	5	0-11

== Honours ==
Conahy Shamrocks

- All-Ireland Junior Club Hurling Championship: 2020 (c)
- Leinster Junior Club Hurling Championship: 2020 (c)
- Kilkenny Junior Hurling Championship: 2020 (c)

Kilkenny

- Leinster Under-20 Hurling Championship: 2019

Achievements
Preceded by William Phelan	All-Ireland Junior Club Hurling Final winning captain 2020	Succeeded by Incumbent
