= 2015–16 All-Ireland Junior Club Hurling Championship =

Championship Details
- Dates: 27 September 2015 – 7 February 2016
- Teams: 28

All Ireland Champions
- Winners: Glenmore (1st win)
- Captain: Philip Roche
- Manager: Tom Mullally

All Ireland Runners-up
- Runners-up: Eoghan Rua
- Captain: Anton Rafferty
- Manager: Padraig Ó Mianáin

Provincial Champions
- Munster: Dungourney
- Leinster: Glenmore
- Ulster: Eoghan Rua
- Connacht: Sylane

Championship Statistics
- Matches Played: 28

The 2015–16 All-Ireland Junior Club Hurling Championship was the 13th staging of the All-Ireland Junior Club Hurling Championship, the Gaelic Athletic Association's third inter-county club hurling tournament. The championship began on 27 September 2015 and ended on 7 February 2016.

Bennettsbridge were the defending champions but availed of their right to promotion to the intermediate grade.

On 7 February 2016, Glenmore won the championship following a 2–9 to 0–12 defeat of Eoghan Rua. This was their first All-Ireland title in this grade.

== Connacht Junior Club Hurling Championship ==
=== Connacht semi-final ===
26 October 2015 Final	Calry/St. Joseph's	2–11 – 1–03	Ballinamore	Markievicz Park
	K Raymond 0-7, D Cox 1-0, K Gilmartin 1-0, F Keown 0-2, R Cox 0-1, D Collery 0-1.

=== Connacht final ===
7 November 2015 Final	Sylane	1–18 – 2–07	Calry/St. Joseph's	Connacht GAA Centre
	S Glynn 0-9, R Keane 1-1, C Burke 0-2, C Canty 0-2, G O'Neill 0-2, R Monaghan 0-1, S Burke 0-1.		K Raymond 1-3, K Gilmartin 1-1, T Kelly 0-1, D Cox 0-1, D Collery 0-1.

== Leinster Junior Club Hurling Championship ==
=== Leinster first round ===
25 October 2015 First round	Clanna Gael	1–06 – 1–17	Lusmagh	St. Loman's Park

25 October 2015 First round	Scoil Uí Chonaill	1–18 – 2–08	Moorefield	Páirc Barróg

=== Leinster quarter-finals ===
8 November 2015 Quarter-final	Lusmagh	5–26 – 0–03	Arklow Rock Parnells	Lusmagh Grounds

8 November 2015 Quarter-final	Brownstown	0–14 – 0–17 (aet)	Trumera	Fr O'Reilly Memorial Park
	J McGuinness 0-9, R Dugdale 0-3, C Rice 0-1, P Gilsenan 0-1.		N Sinnott 0-9, S Holland 0-4, E O'Connor 0-2, J O'Connor 0-1, D Lalor 0-1.

8 November 2015 Quarter-final	Scoil Uí Chonaill	0–01 – 3–20	Glenmore	Clontarf Road

8 November 2015 Quarter-final	St Fechin's	0–11 – 0–04	Carlow Town	Darver COE

=== Leinster semi-finals ===
22 November 2015 Semi-final	Glenmore	5–19 – 1–09	St Fechin's	Nowlan Park

22 November 2015 Semi-final	Lusmagh	3–15 – 2–08	Trumera	Lusmagh Grounds
	P Kinsella 1-9, G Lynch 2-1, L Ryan 0-2, S Gardiner 0-1, E Kelly 0-1, P Corcoran 0-1.		N Sinnott 0-6, R Kavanagh 1-1, D Dowling 1-0, J Coogan 0-1.	Referee: P Burke (Kilkenny)

=== Leinster final ===
16 January 2016 Final	Lusmagh	0–13 – 0–23	Glenmore	O'Connor Park
	P Kinsella 0–12 (10f ); S Gardiner 0–1.	Report	E Murphy 0–8 (4f); G Aylward 0–5; S Murphy, M Aylward (2f) 0–3 each; C Doherty 0–2; A Murphy, J Cody 0–1 each.	Referee: M Murtagh (Westmeath)

== Munster Junior Club Hurling Championship ==
=== Munster quarter-finals ===
1 November 2015 Quarter-final	Dromcollogher/Broadford	4–15 – 0–05	Dr. Croke's	Dromcollogher Grounds
	D McCarthy 1-8, M O'Sullivan 3-1, D Lacey 0-3, T McLoughlin 0-2, P Madigan 0-1.		J Lenihan 0-2, K Curtin 0-1, S Burchill 0-1, M McCarthy 0-1.	Referee: J McCormack (Tipperary)

1 November 2015 Quarter-final	Ennistymon	2–08 – 1–09	Ballylooby-Castlegrace	Ennistymon GAA Park
	L Tierney 2-7, T Malone 0-1.		B Cooney 0-7, J Whelan 1-0, P Kenneally 0-2.	Referee: J Mullins (Limerick)

=== Munster semi-finals ===
14 November 2015 Semi-final	Dungourney	2–11 – 0–05	Dromcollogher/Broadford	Ballyagran Grounds
	R Denny 1–2 (1 sideline 2f), S Casey 1–1, J Griffin 0–4, S Hegarty 0–3, B Ahern 0–1.		D McCarthy 0-2, M Brosnan 0-1, R Lynch 0-1, K Lacey 0-1.	Referee: R McGann (Clare)

14 November 2015 Semi-final	Fenor	2–11 – 0–08	Ennistymon	Walsh Park
	B Gallagher (0-8 0-4f, 0-1 Sl), S Cheasty (2-0), C Rockett, M Nicholls and O St John (0-1 each).	Report	L Tierney (0-5; 0-3f), M McDonagh (0-2; 0-1 65) and P Brennan (0-1).	Referee: P Kelly (Tipperary)

=== Munster final ===
6 December 2015 Final	Dungourney	1–17 – 0–08	Fenor	Mallow GAA Complex
	R Denny 0–11 (6fs, 2 65s); J Griffin 1–2; P Harney 0–2; S Hegarty (f), S Casey 0–1 each.	Report	B Gallagher 0–5 (3fs); C Kirwan 0–2; S Cheasty 0–1.	Referee: R McGann

== Ulster Junior Club Hurling Championship ==
=== Ulster preliminary round ===
27 September 2015 Preliminary round	Cootehill Celtic	w/o – scr.	Fermanagh representatives

=== Ulster quarter-finals ===
4 October 2015 Quarter-final	Truagh Gaels	3–20 – 2–23	Seán Mac Cumhaill's	St. Mary's Park
				Referee: A Ferguson

4 October 2015 Quarter-final	Ballela	3–20 – 2–23	St. Mary's Rasharkin	Ballela Grounds
				Referee: A Nash

4 October 2015 Quarter-final	Cootehill Celtic	1–07 – 2–18	Seán Treacy's	Hugh O'Reilly Park
				Referee: P Branniff

11 October 2015 Quarter-final replay	St. Mary's Rasharkin	0–13 – 1–11	Ballela	St. Patrick's Park
				Referee: J O'Connor

11 October 2015 Quarter-final	Naomh Colum Cille	0–08 – 1–17	Eoghan Rua	O'Neill Park
				Referee: J O'Connor

=== Ulster semi-finals ===
18 October 2015 Semi-final	Ballela	1–14 – 2–09	Seán Treacy's	Athletic Grounds
				Referee: A Ferguson

18 October 2015 Semi-final	Seán Mac Cumhaill's	0–08 – 0–16	Eoghan Rua	Killyclogher Grounds
				Referee: L McCauley

=== Ulster final ===
25 October 2015 Final	Ballela	0–07 – 3–15	Eoghan Rua	Owenbeg COE
	J McCusker 0–5 (4f), M Magee, C Magee 0–1 each.	Report	Ciarán Gaile 1–7 (1–0 pen, 7f), C McGoldrick 1–5, T Magee 1–0, R Leonard 0–2, N Holly 0–1.	Referee: C Cunning

== All-Ireland Junior Club Hurling Championship ==
=== All-Ireland quarter-final ===
7 November 2015 Quarter-final	Fullen Gaels	0–06 – 1–11	Eoghan Rua	Páirc na hÉireann
	D O'Brien (0–2), P Ó Dugáin (0–2 frees), N Unwin, D O'Grady (0–1 each).	Report	C Gaile (0–7, 0–4 frees), T Magee (1–1), N Holly, R Mooney and B McGoldrick (0–1 each).

=== All-Ireland semi-finals ===
24 January 2016 Semi-final	Glenmore	3–10 – 1–11	Dungourney	Carriganore Sports Complex
	M Aylward 1–5 (5fs); A Murphy 2–0; S Murphy 0–3; E Vereker 0–2.	Report	R Denny 0–6 (6fs); S Casey 1–2 (1-1fs); N Motherway, J Griffin, S Hegarty 0–1 each.	Referee: J Heffernan (Wexford)

24 January 2016 Semi-final	Sylane	0–04 – 0–10	Eoghan Rua	Fr. Tierney Park
	S Glynn (0–3, 0–2 frees), S Burke (0–1 free).	Report	C Gaile (0–6, 0–3 frees), R Leonard (0–1), T Magee (0–1), SL McGoldrick (0–1), Colm McGoldrick (0–1).

=== All-Ireland final ===
7 February 2016 Final	Glenmore	2–08 – 0–12	Eoghan Rua	Croke Park
	A Murphy (2–2), M Aylward (0–4, 0-4f), E Murphy (0–1), S Murphy (0–1).	Report	C Gaile (0–7, 0-7f), SL McGoldrick (0–2), L McGoldrick (0–1), Colm McGoldrick (0–1), T Magee (0–1).	Referee: J Clarke (Cavan)
