= Sean Leo McGoldrick =

Irish hurler and Gaelic footballer

Johnathan
Personal information
- Native name: Seán Leon Mac Gualraic (Irish)
- Nickname: Sleo
- Born: 1987 (age 38–39) Coleraine, Northern Ireland
- Height: 1.78 m (5 ft 10 in)

Sport
- Sport: Gaelic football
- Football Position: Left half back
- Hurling Position: Left half forward
Club
- Years: Club
- 2004–: Eoghan Rua
Club titles
	Football	Hurling
Derry titles	18	0
Inter-county
- Years: County
- 2007–2008 2008–2018: Derry (H); Derry (F)
Inter-county titles
- Ulster titles: 0
- All-Irelands: 0
- NFL: 1
- All Stars: 0

Sean Leo McGoldrick is a dual player of Gaelic games who played Gaelic football for the Derry county team, with whom he won a National League title. As a dual player, he played hurling for Derry.

McGoldrick plays club football and hurling for Eoghan Rua. In football, he could play as a forward or in the half-back line. He played as a forward in hurling.

== Personal life ==
McGoldrick went to school at Loreto College in Coleraine. His father Sean played for Antrim. His brother Barry has also played football and hurling for Derry. His sisters play camogie for Derry. His sister Grainne was nominated for Camogie All Stars in both 2006 and 2008.

== Football career ==
=== Club ===
McGoldrick was instrumental in the Eoghan Rua side that won both the 2006 Derry Intermediate and Ulster Intermediate Championships, before losing out in the 2007 All-Ireland Intermediate Club Championship final to Ardfert of Kerry.

=== Inter-county ===
McGoldrick was part of the Derry Under-21 team that finished runners-up in both the 2006 and 2008 Ulster Under-21 Football Championship finals to Tyrone and Down respectively.

He was part of the Derry Senior panel that won the 2008 National League where Derry beat Kerry in the final.

McGoldrick and Derry also reached the National League final in 2009, but were defeated by Kerry. In that campaign he mostly played at left half back, as opposed to his usual role in the forward line.

McGoldrick retired from inter-county football in 2016 but manager Damian McErlain convinced him to return for the 2018 Ulster Senior Football Championship encounter with Donegal; McGoldrick retired again in October 2018.

=== School/college ===
McGoldrick also plays for Queen's University Belfast since 200x. The university finished runners-up to Donegal in the 2009 Dr. McKenna Cup.

== Hurling career ==
=== Club ===
McGoldrick won both the Derry Intermediate Hurling Championship and Derry Junior Hurling Championship with Eoghan Rua in 2006.

=== Inter-county ===
McGoldrick won back-to-back Ulster Under-21 Hurling Championship medals with the Derry Under 21 team in 2007 and 2008.

He played for Derry Senior hurlers between 2007 and 2008. He was named Derry Senior Hurler of the Year for 2007.

=== School/college ===
McGoldrick won an Ulster Colleges Hurling All Star in 2005–06.

== Honours ==
=== County ===
- Ulster Under-21 Hurling Championship (2): 2007, 2008
- National Football League (1): 2008
- Dr McKenna Cup (1): 2011

=== Club ===
- Derry Junior Hurling Championship (1): 2006
- Derry Intermediate Hurling Championship (1): 2006
- Derry Intermediate Football Championship (1): 2006
- Ulster Intermediate Club Football Championship (1): 2006
