= 2019 Cork Junior A Hurling Championship =

2019 Cork Junior Hurling Championship
- Dates: 14 September 2019 – 3 November 2019
- Teams: 14
- Sponsor: Evening Echo
- Champions: Russell Rovers (1st title); Daniel Moynihan (captain); Michael Mannion (manager)
- Runners-up: Carrignavar

Tournament statistics
- Matches played: 13
- Goals scored: 29 (2.23 per match)
- Points scored: 360 (27.69 per match)

The 2019 Cork Junior Hurling Championship was the 122nd staging of the Cork Junior Hurling Championship since its establishment by the Cork County Board in 1895. The championship draw took place on 2 September 2019. The championship began on 14 September 2019 and ended on 3 November 2019.

On 3 November 2019, Russell Rovers won the championship after a 1-17 to 0-09 defeat of Carrignavar in the final at Páirc Uí Rinn. This was their first ever championship title.

== Qualification ==
The Cork Junior Hurling Championship features fourteen teams in the final tournament. Over 70 teams contested the seven divisional championships with the seven respective champions and runners-up automatically qualifying for the county series.

Division	Championship	Champions	Runners-up
Avondhu	North Cork Junior A Hurling Championship	Clyda Rovers	Harbour Rovers
Carbery	South West Junior A Hurling Championship	Ballinascarthy	Kilbree
Carrigdhoun	South East Junior A Hurling Championship	Courcey Rovers	Tracton
Duhallow	Duhallow Junior A Hurling Championship	Newmarket	Kilbrin
Imokilly	East Cork Junior A Hurling Championship	Russell Rovers	Carrignavar
Muskerry	Mid Cork Junior A Hurling Championship	Cloughduv	Éire Óg
Seandún	City Junior A Hurling Championship	Brian Dillons	Whitechurch

== Results ==
=== Round 1 ===
14 September 2019 Round 1	Brian Dillons	2-18 - 2-12	Kilbrin	Mourneabbey Grounds
	J Horgan 0-10, D Rodgers 1-2, K McCormick 1-1, P O'Brien 0-2, R Murphy 0-1, J Murphy 0-1, C McCarthy 0-1.		N O'Callaghan 2-1, S O'Reilly 0-7, S Crowley 0-1, N Field 0-1, D O'Sullivan 0-1, W Heffernan 0-1.	Referee: T O'Brien (Ballygarvan)

15 September 2019 Round 1	Newmarket	4-15 - 1-13	Tracton	Páirc Eoin Mhic Charthaigh
	D Hannon 1-6, R O'Keeffe 2-2, B O'Connor 1-3, C Browne 0-2, J Guiney 0-1, N Collins 0-1.		A Lyons 1-2, D Griffin 0-5, K Lynch 0-3, B Lynch 0-1, D O'Callaghan 0-1, S Kiely 0-1.	Referee: M Myers (Blarney)

21 September 2019 Round 1	Clyda Rovers	1-10 - 1-18	Kilbree	Cloughduv Grounds
	C Buckley 1-5, S Ronayne 0-1, C O'Sullivan 0-1, B O'Connor 0-1, D Walsh 0-1, D Buckley 0-1.		D Coakley 0-8, S Reale 1-1, D McCarthy 0-4, K Keohane 0-1, O Scannell 0-1, D Coffey 0-1, J Deasy 0-1, M O'Donovan 0-1.	Referee: B Barry-Murphy (Aghabullogue)

22 September 2019 Round 1	Russell Rovers	2-22 - 1-09	Éire Óg	Páirc Lios gCúl

22 September 2019 Round 1	Cloughduv	1-11 - 1-16	Carrignavar	Ballinora Grounds

28 September 2019 Round 1	Courcey Rovers	3-06 - 0-12	Harbour Rovers	Páirc Shéamuis de Barra
	V Hurley 1-2, L Collins 1-0, B Ryan 1-0, C Maguire 0-2, G Moloney 0-2.		S Condon 0-10, D Gallagher 0-1, P Hannon 0-1.	Referee: J Hennessy (Dungourney)

28 September 2019 Round 1	Ballinascarthy	0-17 - 0-08	Whitechurch	Brinny Sportsfield
	J Ryan 0-15, B O'Donovan 0-1, D McCarthy 0-1.		J O'Riordan 0-3, H Woulfe 0-2, P Dennehy 0-2, D Burke 0-1.	Referee: T O'Brien (Ballygarvan)

=== Quarter-finals ===
5 October 2019 Quarter-final	Russell Rovers	4-18 - 1-10	Kilbree	Páirc Liam Mhic Crthaigh
	J Beausang 1-4, J McGrath 1-3, B Hartnett 1-2, K Moynihan 0-4, E McGrath 1-0, D Moynihan 0-3, J Kennefick 0-2.		D Coakley 1-3, D Coffey 0-2, K Keohane 0-1, M O'Donovan 0-1, D O'Gorman 0-1, J Deasy 0-1, O Scannell 0-1.	Referee: T Lyons (Douglas)

5 October 2019 Quarter-final	Newmarket	0-15 - 0-12	Brian Dillons	O'Connell Park
	D Hannon 0-6, C O'Keeffe 0-3, B O'Connor 0-2, R O'Keeffe 0-2, M Cottrell 0-1, C Crowley 0-1.		T Lawrence 0-6, C McCarthy 0-3, K McCormack 0-1, K Brosnan 0-1, D Rodgers 0-1.	Referee: A Hyland (Kilworth)

5 October 2019 Quarter-final	Courcey Rovers	1-13 - 2-13	Carrignavar	Cloughduv Grounds
	G Moloney 0-6, J O'Reilly 1-1, C Maguire 0-2, B Ryan 0-1, D Coughlan 0-1, T Collins 0-1, V Hurley 0-1.		D Sweeney 2-1, J Forde 0-6, P Sheehan 0-3, P Murphy 0-1, A Hegarty 0-1, C Hayes 0-1.	Referee: P Lyons (Bishopstown)

=== Semi-finals ===
19 October 2019 Semi-final	Ballinascarthy	0-17 - 1-18	Carrignavar	Éire Óg Grounds
	J Ryan 0-7, B Murray 0-4, S Ryan 0-3, B O'Donovan 0-1, C Cullinane 0-1, D Nyhan 0-1.		B Murphy 1-3, P Sheehan 0-6, J Forde 0-4, A Dorgan 0-2, A Hegarty 0-1, M Hickey 0-1, P Murphy 0-1.	Referee: C Walsh

19 October 2019 Semi-final	Russell Rovers	0-19 - 0-12	Newmarket	Mourneabbey Grounds
	J Beausang 0-9, L Duggan-Murray 0-4, K Walsh 0-2, D Moynihan 0-1, R Walsh 0-1, K Moynihan 0-1, B Hartnett 0-1.		D Hannon 0-9, J Guiney 0-1, R O'Keeffe 0-1, C Browne 0-1.	Referee: C Egan (Glen Rovers)

=== Final ===
3 November 2019 Final	Russell Rovers	1-17 - 0-09	Carrignavar	Páirc Uí Rinn
	B Hartnett 1-4; J Beausang 0-7 (two frees, one sixty five); L Duggan-Murray; D Moynihan, 0-2 each, J McGrath, K Walsh 0-1 each.	Report	P Murphy 0-4 (all frees); T Geaney 0-2 (one free), J Forde 0-2 each; C Hayes 0-1.	Referee: M Maher (St. Finbarr's)
