= Russell Rovers GAA =

Gaelic games club in County Cork, Ireland

Russell Rovers
- Fánaithe an Ruiséalaigh
- Founded: 1930
- County: Cork
- Colours: Black and Amber
- Grounds: Shanagarry
- Coordinates: 51°51′11″N 8°02′10″W

Playing kits
Standard colours

Russell Rovers is a Gaelic football and hurling club based in the village of Shanagarry, County Cork, Ireland. The club draws its support from Churchtown South, Ballycotton, Garryvoe and Shanagarry itself. It competes in competitions organised by Cork county board and the Imokilly divisional board.

== History ==
The club was founded in 1930. It was popularly believed that the club acquired its name from the neighbouring townland of Ballyrussell, while other research suggests that it was possibly named after a Fr John Russell who was Catholic parish priest of Cloyne in the 1840s. Fr Russell was a prominent and sometimes controversial figure, and a prolific letter-writer - as can be seen from correspondence with the Cork Examiner and Cork Constitution newspapers in October 1848 when he took issue with the local Protestant curate of Ballycotton, whom he accused of proselytism; i.e., of bribing hungry children with food to attend Protestant schools. Fr Russell is also credited with assisting in setting up National Schools in the area.

After winning the club's first Cork Junior A and Munster Junior Club Hurling Championship finals in 2019, the club progressed to the 2019–20 All-Ireland Junior Club Hurling Championship final, after beating Mícheál Breathnach CLG of Galway in the semi-final. The club ended their run as runners-up to Conahy Shamrocks in the final.

The club also reached the finals of the 2024–25 All-Ireland Junior Club Hurling Championship, having won the Cork Premier Junior and Munster Junior Club Hurling Championship finals in 2024. Having beaten Ballinascreen of Derry in the semi-final, Russell Rovers finished as runners-up to St Lachtain's of Kilkenny in the final.

== Honours ==
- All-Ireland Junior Club Hurling Championship (0): (runners-up 2020 and 2025)
- Munster Junior Club Hurling Championship (2): 2019, 2024
- Cork Junior A Hurling Championship (1): 2019
- Cork Premier Junior Hurling Championship (1): 2024
- Cork Junior B Inter-Divisional Football Championship (1): 2018
- East Cork Junior A Hurling Championship (2): 2018, 2019
- East Cork Junior A Hurling League (2): 2017, 2018
- East Cork Junior B Hurling Championship (5): 1945, 1958, 1963, 1978, 2002
- East Cork Junior C Hurling Championship (1): 2014
- East Cork Junior A Football Championship (1): 1931
- East Cork Junior B Football Championship (2): 1986, 2018

== Notable players ==
- Brian Hartnett
- Kevin Hartnett
- Ciarán Sheehan
