= St Mary's GAC Rasharkin =

Gaelic games club in County Antrim

- Naomh Mhuire Ros Earcáin
- Founded: 1943
- County: Antrim
- Colours: Blue, Saffron, White
- Grounds: Dreen
- Coordinates: 54°56′29″N 6°29′07″W

Playing kits
Standard colours

Senior Club Championships
	All Ireland	Ulster champions	Antrim champions
Ladies' football:	–	–	1

St Mary's Gaelic Athletic Club Rasharkin is a Gaelic football, hurling and camogie club based in Rasharkin, County Antrim, Northern Ireland.

== History ==
Gaelic games were played in the parish from 1909 by a team called St. Olcan's, but St. Mary's GAC was founded on St Patrick's Day 1943. Initially focusing on hurling, Gaelic football later became the main sport.

Their current grounds at Dreen (in the countryside to the south of Rasharkin village) were built in 1980–83; a second pitch, the Jamesie McLernon Memorial Pitch, was added in 2000.

A Rasharkin player, coach and club official, Gerry (Gearóid) Dalrymple, was murdered by the Ulster Defence Association (UDA) in the 1993 Castlerock killings.

The ladies' football team was founded in 1995, and in 1998 won the club's only county senior title. Rasharkin Camogie Club were integrated into the club in 2010.

== Honours ==
=== Gaelic football ===
- Antrim Intermediate Football Championship (2): 1976, 2010
- Antrim Junior Football Championship (2): 1958, 2003
- Antrim Minor Football Championship (3): 1948, 1994, 1999
- Cahan Cup (1): 1982

=== Ladies' Gaelic football ===
- Antrim Senior Ladies' Football Championship (1): 1998

=== Hurling ===
- Antrim Junior Hurling Championship (4): 1991, 2009, 2015, 2024
