= Padova Gaelic Football =

Gaelic sports club in northern Italy

Padova GFC
- Padua Cumann Peil Ghaelach
- Founded: 2012
- County: Europe
- Nickname: "The Paddies"
- Colours: Red and white
- Grounds: Padua, Italy
- Coordinates: 45.25°N 11.52°E

Playing kits
Standard colours

Padova Gaelic Football (Padova GFC), was a Gaelic Athletic Association (GAA) club based in Padua, north-eastern Italy. The club, founded in June 2012, was the second oldest Gaelic football club in Italy, after Ascaro Rovigo GFC, from the neighbouring town of Rovigo, against which "The Paddies" (as they are called by their fans), contest twice a year the "Adige Cup", once in Padua and once in Rovigo: the first "Adige Cup" was the first Gaelic Football match ever played in Italy. It played in the East/Central Championship along with Rovigo and the third Italian Gaelic Football team, SS Lazio, and it took part in the European Finals played in Athlone, Ireland, in 2013, playing them again in Maastricht the following years.

The club's colours were red and white. The club disbanded around 2020.
