= Deutscher Bund Gälischer Sportarten =

Association of German Gaelic games clubs

DBGS logo

The Deutscher Bund Gälischer Sportarten (DBGS), also known as the German GAA, is a union of German Gaelic games clubs. As of 2021, the union consisted of 11 German Gaelic Athletic Association clubs. Founded in 2015, the DBGS organises the Gaelic football, hurling and camogie cups held in Germany and is also responsible for the Germany national team selection for international cups.

== History ==
The union was founded in 2015 in Berlin. Its goals are the coordination of combined project and funding proposals and the organisation of the German cups in hurling, camogie and Gaelic football. The DBGS also coordinates coaching and referee courses for Gaelic games. It is currently not a federation of the GAA, but mostly a union of the German clubs which are part of the Gaelic Athletic Association and Gaelic Games Europe.

The long-term goal of the DBGS is the establishment of the Gaelic games as an official sport in Germany.

== Clubs ==
As of 2021, there were eleven clubs in Germany:

Name	City	Gaelic Football	Hurling/Camogie	Foundation year
Rómhánaigh Augsburg Óg GAA e.V.	Augsburg	yes (Central East-Region)	no	2015
Berlin GAA	Berlin	yes (Central East-Region)	yes	2014
Setanta Berlin GAA e.V.	Berlin	yes	yes	2015
Darmstadt GAA e.V.	Darmstadt	yes (Benelux-Region)	yes	2015
Dresden Hurling e.V.	Dresden	no	yes	2012
Düsseldorf GFC e.V.	Düsseldorf	yes (Benelux-Region)	no	2013
Frankfurt Sarsfields	Frankfurt am Main	yes (Benelux-Region)	no	2009
Hamburg GAA e.V	Hamburg	yes (Benelux-Region)	yes	2015
Cologne Celtics GAA	Cologne	yes	yes	2012
Munich Colmcilles e.V.	Munich	yes (Central East-Region)	yes	2001
Stuttgart GAA	Stuttgart	no	yes	2016
