= 2010 European Gaelic Football Championship =

European Gaelic Football Championship 2010
Tournament details
- Year: 2010

Winners
- Champions: Den Haag (3rd win)

European Gaelic Football Shield 2010
Tournament details
- Year: 2010

Winners
- Champions: Copenhagen (2nd win)

The 2010 Gaelic Football Championship is the 2010 season of the tournament, which includes European teams other than those from Ireland and Britain. The Championship follows two phases. During the first part of the year teams compete within their own regions in a series of four to five tournaments to determine the regional champions and runners-up. During the second part of the year the champion and runner-up of each region compete in a series of three pan-European tournaments to determine the European Champion. All teams who did not reach the top two spots of their regional championship compete in a second-tier championship called the Shield. In each tournament teams gain points depending on their respective performances (winner gains 25 points, runner-up 20 points, etc.). The matches are played 11 a side and 10 to 15 minutes a half (depending on the number of matches to be played on the day).

== Regional Phase ==
During the Regional Phase, only the points gained in each team's best three tournaments count.

=== Benelux ===
==== Table ====
| Rank | Team | Points |
|---|---|---|
| 1 | | |

==== Round 2 – Den Haag Tournament – 10 April ====
This tournament saw 4 teams participating. It has been played in round robin format leading to 3rd place Final and Grand Final.

===== Group stage =====
| Rank | Team | Goal Average | Points |
|---|---|---|---|
| 1 | Brussels Belgium A | +31 | 5 |
| 2 | Den Haag | +28 | 5 |
| 3 | Amsterdam | −2 | 2 |
| 4 | Brussels Belgium B | −57 | 0 |

Den Haag 2–9 (15) Amsterdam 0–4 (4)
Belgium A 5–12 (27) Belgium B 0–1 (1)
Amsterdam 3–10 (19) Belgium B 1–2 (5)
Den Haag 1–6 (9) Belgium A 1–6 (9)
Den Haag 4–11 (23) Belgium B 1–3 (6)
Belgium A 2–9 (15) Amsterdam 3–1 (10)

===== Finals =====
3rd place Final:
Amsterdam 1–6 (9) Belgium B 0–2 (2)

Final:
Belgium A 1–11 (14) Den Haag 1–10 (13) (after extra time)

===== Points allowance for the tournament =====
| Rank | Team | Points |
|---|---|---|
| 1 | Belgium A | 25 |
| 2 | Den Haag | 20 |
| 3 | Amsterdam | 16 |
| 4 | Belgium B | 13 |

=== East and Central ===
==== Table ====
| Rank | Team | Points |
|---|---|---|
| 1 | | |

=== Iberia ===
==== Table ====
| Rank | Team | Points |
|---|---|---|
| 1 | | |

==== Round 4 – Iruna-Pamplona Tournament – 5 June ====
This tournament saw 4 teams participating. It has been played in round robin format leading to a Final between the top two teams.

===== Group stage =====
| Rank | Team | Goal Average | Points |
|---|---|---|---|
| 1 | Madrid | +21 | 6 |
| 2 | Valencia | +3 | 4 |
| 3 | Barcelona | +5 | 2 |
| 4 | Pamplona | −29 | 0 |

Valencia 1–10 (13) Pamplona 0–3 (3)
Madrid 1–7 (10) Barcelona 2–2 (8)
Pamplona 0–4 (4) Madrid 2–9 (15)
Valencia 1–9 (12) Barcelona 1–8 (11)
Pamplona 0–2 (2) Barcelona 1–7 (10)
Valencia 0–2 (2) Madrid 2–4 (10)

===== Final =====
Madrid 1–5 (8) Valencia 0–5 (5)

===== Points allowance for the tournament =====
| Rank | Team | Points |
|---|---|---|
| 1 | Madrid | 25 |
| 2 | Valencia | 20 |
| 3 | Barcelona | 16 |
| 4 | Pamplona | 13 |

=== North West ===
==== Table ====
After Round 4
If a team participates in all four tournaments, only its three best results count. If two teams have the equal number of points, the fourth result is the decider.
The top two teams qualify for the European Championship. All other teams go on to play the European Shield.

| Rank | Team | Round 1 | Round 2 | Round 3 | Round 4 | Total |
|---|---|---|---|---|---|---|
| 1 | Guernsey Gaels | 20 | 25 | 25 | – | 70 |
| 2 | Paris Gaels | 25 | 16 | – | 25 | 66 |
| 3 | Dogues Gaelic FC (Saint-Malo) | 16 | 5 | 11 | 16 | 43 |
| 4 | Jersey Irish | – | 6.5 | 16 | 20 | 42.5 |
| 5 | Ar Gwazi Gouez (Rennes) | 13 | 6.5 | 20 | – | 39.5 |
| 6 | US Liffré | 11 | 20 | – | – | 31 |
| 7 | Gwened (Vannes) | 6 | 5 | – | 13 | 24 |
| 8 | Gwenrann (Guérande) | 10 | 10 | – | – | 20 |
| 9 | GF Bro Leon (Brest) | 8 | 11 | – | – | 19 |
| 10 | Paris Gaels Lutetia | – | 9 | – | 10 | 19 |
| 11 | AFI Lyon | – | 6 | – | 11 | 17 |
| 12 | Entente costarmoricaine (Saint-Brieuc/Saint-Quay-Perros) | 7 | 8 | – | – | 15 |
| 13 | Guernsey Gaels B | – | – | 13 | – | 13 |
| 14 | Naoned (Nantes) | 9 | 3 | – | – | 12 |
| 15 | Tolosa Gaels (Toulouse) | – | 7 | – | – | 7 |

Brest is placed above Paris Gaels Lutetia thanks to a better overall score difference.

==== Round 1 – Brest Tournament – 10 April ====
This tournament saw 10 teams participating. For the first part of the tournament, teams were drawn into 3 pools where each team played the other two (2 points for a win, 1 point for a draw, 0 for a loss). After all pool matches were played, the teams were reshuffled into three groups depending on their performance in the pool stage.

===== Phase 1 =====
====== Pool A ======
| Rank | Team | Goal Average | Points |
|---|---|---|---|
| 1 | Paris Gaels | +54 | 4 |
| 2 | Nantes | −26 | 2 |
| 3 | Vannes | −28 | 0 |

Paris Gaels 7–5 (26) Vannes 1–1 (4)
Vannes 1–2 (5) Nantes 2–5 (11)
Paris Gaels 8–8 (32) Nantes 0–0 (0)

====== Pool B ======
| Rank | Team | Goal Average | Points |
|---|---|---|---|
| 1 | Guernsey Gaels | +43 | 4 |
| 2 | Guérande | −18 | 2 |
| 3 | Brest | −25 | 0 |

Guernsey Gaels 7–4 (25) Brest 1–0 (3)
Guérande 1–5 (8) Brest 1–2 (5)
Guernsey Gaels 5–7 (22) Guérande 0–1 (1)

====== Pool C ======
| Rank | Team | Goal Average | Points |
|---|---|---|---|
| 1 | Rennes | +22 | 5 |
| 2 | Saint-Malo | −4 | 4 |
| 3 | Liffré | +13 | 3 |
| 4 | Entente costarmoricaine | −31 | 0 |

Rennes 2–7 (13) Saint-Malo 1–0 (3)
Liffré 0–2 (2) Rennes 0–2 (2)
Entente 0–4 (4) Rennes 3–4 (16)
Saint-Malo 0–4 (4) Liffré 0–2 (2)
Saint-Malo 1–4 (7) Entente 0–3 (3)
Liffré 5–2 (17) Entente 0–2 (2)

Pool C table without taking into account each of the top three teams' matches against the bottom team so that the reshuffling is equal.

| Rank | Team | Goal Average | Points |
|---|---|---|---|
| 1 | Rennes | +10 | 3 |
| 2 | Saint-Malo | −8 | 2 |
| 3 | Liffré | −2 | 1 |

===== Phase 2 =====
====== Championship ======
(1st to 4th place – knock-out format)

Semi-Final 1: Best of first-placed teams vs. best of second-placed teams
Paris Gaels 3–6 (15) Saint-Malo 0–5 (5)
Semi-Final 2: 2nd best of first-placed teams vs. 3rd best of first-placed teams
Guernsey Gaels 0–7 (7) Rennes 0–3 (3)

3rd place Final
Saint-Malo 0–3 (3) Rennes 0–3 (3) (Saint-Malo won in penalty shootouts 3 to 1)
Final
Paris Gaels 4–9 (21) Guernsey Gaels 0–2 (2)

====== Shield ======
(5th to 7th place – round robin format)

2nd best of second-placed teams: Guérande
3rd best of second-placed teams: Nantes
Best of third-placed teams: Liffré

| Rank | Team | Goal Average | Points |
|---|---|---|---|
| 5 | Liffré | +2 | 2 |
| 6 | Guérande | −1 | 2 |
| 7 | Nantes | −1 | 2 |

As they have the same goal-average, Guérande and Nantes are ranked according to their head-to-head encounter which turned in favour of Guérande.

Guérande 1–0 (3) Liffré 1–3 (6)
Nantes 1–3 (6) Liffré 0–5 (5)
Guérande 2–0 (6) Nantes 1–1 (4)

====== Challenge ======
(8th to 10th place – round robin format)

2nd best of third-placed teams: Brest
3rd best of third-placed teams: Vannes
4th of pool C: Entente costarmoricaine

| Rank | Team | Goal Average | Points |
|---|---|---|---|
| 8 | Brest | +12 | 3 |
| 9 | Entente costarmoricaine | +5 | 2 |
| 10 | Vannes | −17 | 1 |

Brest 1–3 (6) Vannes 1–3 (6)
Vannes 0–2 (2) Entente 4–7 (19)
Brest 2–4 (16) Entente 1–1 (4)

===== Points allowance for the tournament =====
| Rank | Team | Points |
|---|---|---|
| 1 | Paris Gaels | 25 |
| 2 | Guernsey Gaels | 20 |
| 3 | Saint-Malo | 16 |
| 4 | Rennes | 13 |
| 5 | Liffré | 11 |
| 6 | Guérande | 10 |
| 7 | Nantes | 9 |
| 8 | Brest | 8 |
| 9 | Entente costarmoricaine (Saint-Brieuc/Saint-Quay-Perros) | 7 |
| 10 | Vannes | 6 |

==== Round 2 – Liffré Tournament – 22 May ====
This tournament saw 12 teams participating. For the first part of the tournament, teams were drawn into 4 pools where each team played the other two (2 points for a win, 1 point for a draw, 0 for a loss). After all pool matches were played, the teams were reshuffled into three groups depending on their performance in the pool stage.

===== Phase 1 =====
====== Pool A ======
| Rank | Team | Goal Average | Points |
|---|---|---|---|
| 1 | Paris Gaels | +18 | 4 |
| 2 | Guérande | 0 | 2 |
| 3 | Saint-Malo | −18 | 0 |

Saint-Malo 3–3 (12) Guérande 3–5 (14)
Guérande 0–3 (3) Paris Gaels 0–5 (5)
Saint-Malo 0–0 (0) Paris Gaels 3–7 (16)

====== Pool B ======
| Rank | Team | Goal Average | Points |
|---|---|---|---|
| 1 | Jersey/Rennes | +28 | 4 |
| 2 | Brest | −7 | 2 |
| 3 | Vannes | −21 | 0 |

Jersey/Rennes 3–6 (15) Vannes 0–2 (2)
Vannes 0–0 (0) Brest 2–2 (8)
Jersey/Rennes 4–6 (18) Brest 1–0 (3)

====== Pool C ======
| Rank | Team | Goal Average | Points |
|---|---|---|---|
| 1 | Liffré | +18 | 4 |
| 2 | Entente costarmoricaine | −14 | 2 |
| 3 | Toulouse | −4 | 0 |

Liffré 0–6 (6) Toulouse 0–3 (3)
Liffré 4–6 (18) Entente costarmoricaine 1–0 (3)
Entente costarmoricaine 1–3 (6) Toulouse 0–5 (5)

====== Pool D ======
| Rank | Team | Goal Average | Points |
|---|---|---|---|
| 1 | Guernsey Gaels | +28 | 4 |
| 2 | Paris Gaels Lutetia | −12 | 2 |
| 3 | Lyon | −14 | 0 |

Lyon 0–0 (0) Guernsey Gaels 2–6 (12)
Paris Gaels Lutetia 1–5 (8) Lyon 1–3 (6)
Paris Gaels Lutetia 0–0 (0) Guernsey Gaels 2–8 (14)

===== Phase 2 =====
====== Championship ======
(1st to 4th place – knock-out format)
Top team of each pool
Semi-Final 1:
Liffré 0–8 (8) Jersey/Rennes 0–7 (7)
Semi-Final 2:
Guernsey Gaels 1–6 (9) Paris Gaels 0–0 (0)

3rd place Final:
Paris Gaels won over Jersey/Rennes by forfeit.
Final:
Guernsey Gaels 2–8 (14) Liffré 1–3 (6)

====== Shield ======
(5th to 8th place – knock-out format)
Second best team of each pool
Semi-final 1:
Guérande 1–3 (6) Paris Gaels Lutetia 0–2 (2)
Semi-final 2:
Entente costarmoricaine 1–4 (7) Brest 5–2 (17)
7th place final:
Entente costarmoricaine 1–3 (6) Paris Gaels Lutetia 2–3 (9)
5th place final:
Brest won over Guérande by forfeit.

====== Challenge ======
(9th to 12th place – knock-out format)
Bottom team of each pool
Semi-final 1:
Vannes 1–0 (3) Toulouse 2–5 (11)
Semi-final 2:
Lyon 2–2 (8) Saint-Malo 0–3 (3)
11th place final:
Saint-Malo 0–3 (3) Vannes 0–4 (4)
9th place final:
Lyon 0–2 (2) Toulouse 1–3 (6)

===== Points allowance for the tournament =====
As Jersey and Rennes competed as a single team, the points earned in the tournament are split equally between the two.
Nantes earned 3 points for providing two players or more to Lyon.

| Rank | Team | Points |
|---|---|---|
| 1 | Guernsey Gaels | 25 |
| 2 | Liffré | 20 |
| 3 | Paris Gaels | 16 |
| 4 | Jersey/Rennes | 13 (6.5 points each) |
| 5 | Brest | 11 |
| 6 | Guérande | 10 |
| 7 | Paris Gaels Lutetia | 9 |
| 8 | Entente costarmoricaine | 8 |
| 9 | Toulouse | 7 |
| 10 | Lyon | 6 |
| 11 | Vannes | 5 |
| 12 | Saint-Malo | 5 |
| - | Nantes | 3 |

==== Round 3 – Guernsey Tournament – 5 June ====
This tournament saw 5 teams participating. It has been played in round robin format.

| Rank | Team | Goal Average | Points |
|---|---|---|---|
| 1 | Guernsey A | +41 | 8 |
| 2 | Rennes | +15 | 6 |
| 3 | Jersey | +32 | 4 |
| 4 | Guernsey B | −40 | 2 |
| 5 | Saint-Malo | −48 | 0 |

Guernsey A 3–9 (18) Rennes 2–2 (8)
Jersey 5–1 (16) Guernsey B 1–0 (3)
Guernsey A 0–8 (8) Jersey 1–2 (5)
Guernsey B 3–2 (11) Rennes 5–6 (21)
Saint-Malo 1–0 (3) Jersey 8–3 (27)
Rennes 5–2 (17) Jersey 5–0 (15)
Guernsey B 3–4 (13) Saint-Malo 2–2 (8)
Guernsey A 8–5 (29) Guernsey B 1–4 (7)
Saint-Malo 3–3 (12) Guernsey A 3–9 (18)
Rennes 5–8 (23) Saint-Malo 3–1 (10)

===== Points allowance for the tournament =====
| Rank | Team | Points |
|---|---|---|
| 1 | Guernsey A | 25 |
| 2 | Rennes | 20 |
| 3 | Jersey | 16 |
| 4 | Guernsey B | 13 |
| 5 | Saint-Malo | 11 |

==== Round 4 – Paris Tournament – 12 June ====
This tournament saw 6 teams participating. For the first part of the tournament, teams were drawn into 2 pools where each team played the other two (2 points for a win, 1 point for a draw, 0 for a loss). The top two teams of each group went on to play the semi-finals whereas the bottom team of each group played the 5th/6th ranking match.

===== Phase 1 =====
====== Pool A ======
| Rank | Team | Goal Average | Points |
|---|---|---|---|
| 1 | Paris Gaels | +32 | 4 |
| 2 | Vannes | −3 | 2 |
| 3 | Paris Gaels Lutetia | −29 | 0 |

Paris Gaels 4–7 (19) Paris Gaels Lutetia 2–1 (7)
Paris Gaels 3–12 (21) Vannes 0–1 (1)
Paris Gaels Lutetia 1–1 (4) Vannes 5–5 (21)

====== Pool B ======
| Rank | Team | Goal Average | Points |
|---|---|---|---|
| 1 | Jersey | +26 | 4 |
| 2 | Saint-Malo | −12 | 2 |
| 3 | Lyon | −14 | 0 |

Lyon 1–3 (6) Saint-Malo 2–5 (11)
Saint-Malo 0–4 (4) Jersey 4–9 (21)
Jersey 1–9 (12) Lyon 0–3 (3)

===== Phase 2 =====
Semi-final 1: 1st of pool A vs. 2nd of pool B
Paris Gaels 4–12 (24) Saint-Malo 1–2 (5)

Semi-final 2: 1st of pool B vs. 2nd of pool A
Jersey 3–12 (21) Vannes 0–3 (3)

5th place final: 3rd of pool A vs. 3rd of pool B
Paris Gaels Lutetia 1–5 (8) Lyon 2–3 (9)

3rd place final: loser of semi-final 1 vs. loser of semi-final 2
Saint-Malo 1–5 (8) Vannes 1–3 (6)

Final: winner of semi-final 1 vs. winner of semi-final 2
Paris Gaels 1–11 (14) Jersey 3–1 (10)

===== Points allowance for the tournament =====
| Rank | Team | Points |
|---|---|---|
| 1 | Paris Gaels | 25 |
| 2 | Jersey | 20 |
| 3 | Saint-Malo | 16 |
| 4 | Vannes | 13 |
| 5 | Lyon | 11 |
| 6 | Paris Gaels Lutetia | 10 |

=== Scandinavia ===
==== Table ====
After Round 1
If a team participates in all four tournaments, only its three best results count.
The top two teams qualify for the European Championship. All other teams go on to play the European Shield.

| Rank | Team | Round 1 | Round 2 | Round 3 | Round 4 | Total |
|---|---|---|---|---|---|---|
| 1 | Malmö | 25 | 20 | 3rd | 3rd | 45 |
| 2 | Stockholm Gaels | 20 | 25 | 1st | 1st | 45 |
| 3 | Copenhagen | 16 | 13 | – | 4th | 29 |
| 4 | Gothenburg | 13 | 16 | – | 2nd | 29 |
| 5 | Oslo | 11 | 11 | 2nd | – | 22 |

==== Round 1 – Copenhagen Tournament – 22 May ====
This tournament saw 5 teams participating. It has been played in round robin format leading to a Final between the top two teams.

===== Group stage =====
| Rank | Team | Goal Average | Points |
|---|---|---|---|
| 1 | Stockholm | +23 | 8 |
| 2 | Malmö | +5 | 6 |
| 3 | Copenhagen | +24 | 4 |
| 4 | Gothenburg | −15 | 2 |
| 5 | Oslo | −37 | 0 |

Malmö 0–5 (5) Copenhagen 0–4 (4)
Gothenburg 1–6 (9) Oslo 0–0 (0)
Stockholm 1–6 (9) Malmö 1–3 (6)
Copenhangen 3–7 (16) Gothenburg 0–1 (1)
Oslo 0–1 (1) Stockholm 1–7 (10)
Malmö 0–5 (5) Gothenburg 0–4 (4)
Copenhagen 3–4 (13) Oslo 0–0
Gothenburg 1–1 (4) Stockholm 1–9 (12)
Oslo 0–1 (1) Malmö 0–7 (7)
Stockholm 0–6 (6) Copenhagen 0–3 (3)

===== Final =====
Stockholm 0–2 (2) Malmö 0–6 (6)

===== Points allowance for the tournament =====
| Rank | Team | Points |
|---|---|---|
| 1 | Malmö | 25 |
| 2 | Stockholm | 20 |
| 3 | Copenhagen | 16 |
| 4 | Gothenburg | 13 |
| 5 | Oslo | 11 |

==== Round 4 – Gothenburg Tournament – 14 August ====
This tournament saw 4 teams participating.
It was played in round robin format leading to a Final between the top two teams.

Group stage

| Rank | Team | Points Difference | Points |
|---|---|---|---|
| 1 | Stockholm | +20 | 6 |
| 2 | Gothenburg | +4 | 3 |
| 3 | Malmö | −1 | 3 |
| 4 | Copenhagen | −23 | 0 |

Malmö 0–1 (1) Stockholm 1–4 (7)
Gothenburg 1–5 (8) Copenhangen 0–3 (3)
Malmö 1–9 (12) Gothenburg 2–6 (12)
Stockholm 3–6 (15) Copenhagen 0–2 (2)
Malmö 1–5 (8) Copenhagen 0–3 (3)
Gothenburg 0–3 (3) Stockholm 0–4 (4)

Final
Gothenburg 2–2 (8) Stockholm 3–13 (21)

===== Points allowance for the tournament =====
| Rank | Team | Points |
|---|---|---|
| 1 | Stockholm | ? |
| 2 | Gothenburg | ? |
| 3 | Malmö | ? |
| 4 | Copenhagen | ? |

== Pan-European Phase ==
=== Championship ===
==== Table ====
After round 2

| Rank | Team | Round 1 | Round 2 | Round 3 | Total |
|---|---|---|---|---|---|
| 1 | Den Haag | 25 | 25 | | 50 |
| 2 | Paris Gaels | 20 | 16 | | 36 |
| 3 | Brussels Belgium | 13 | 20 | | 33 |
| 4 | Luxembourg | 16 | 9 | | 25 |
| 5 | Guernsey Gaels | 11 | 10 | | 21 |
| 6 | Stockholm Gaels | – | 13 | | 13 |
| 7 | Budapest Rangers | – | 11 | | 11 |

==== Round 1 – Munich Tournament – 11 September ====
This tournament saw 5 teams participating. It has been played in round robin format followed by a 3rd/4th final and a Grand Final.

| Rank | Team | Score difference | Points |
|---|---|---|---|
| 1 | Den Haag | +13 | 6 |
| 2 | Paris Gaels | +18 | 6 |
| 3 | Brussels Belgium | +11 | 5 |
| 4 | Luxembourg | −13 | 2 |
| 5 | Guernsey Gaels | −29 | 1 |

Guernsey 1–3 (6) Luxembourg 2–8 (14)
Belgium 2–2 (8) Paris 2–4 (10)
Luxembourg 0–6 (6) Den Haag 1–7 (10)
Belgium 2–4 (10) Guernsey 1–7 (10)
Den Haag 0–9 (9) Paris 0–7 (7)
Luxembourg 1–1 (4) Belgium 4–4 (16)
Paris 4–4 (16) Guernsey 0–3 (3)
Belgium 0–6 (6) Den Haag 0–5 (5)
Paris 2–7 (13) Luxembourg 2–2 (8)
Guernsey 0–1 (1) Den Haag 1–6 (9)

===== Finals =====
Third place final
Belgium 1–3 (6) Luxembourg 1–4 (7)

Final
Den Haag 2–7 (13) Paris 2–3 (9)

===== Points allowance for the tournament =====
| Rank | Team | Points |
|---|---|---|
| 1 | Den Haag | 25 |
| 2 | Paris Gaels | 20 |
| 3 | Luxembourg | 16 |
| 4 | Brussels Belgium | 13 |
| 5 | Guernsey Gaels | 11 |

==== Round 2 – Budapest Tournament – 9 October ====
This tournament saw 7 teams participating. For the first part of the tournament, teams were drawn into 2 pools where each team played the other two or three (2 points for a win, 1 point for a draw, 0 for a loss). The top two teams of each group went on to play the semi-finals whereas the 3rd-placed team of each group played the 5th/6th ranking match.

===== Phase 1 =====
====== Pool A ======
| Rank | Team | Score Difference | Points |
|---|---|---|---|
| 1 | Den Haag | +18 | 4 |
| 2 | Belgium | +3 | 2 |
| 3 | Guernsey | −18 | 0 |

Guernsey 0–6 (6) Belgium 0–10 (10)
Belgium 1–3 (6) Den Haag 0–7 (7)
Guernsey 1–4 (7) Den Haag 3–9 (18)

====== Pool B ======
| Rank | Team | Score Difference | Points |
|---|---|---|---|
| 1 | Paris | +20 | 5 |
| 2 | Stockholm | +6 | 4 |
| 3 | Budapest | +24 | 3 |
| 4 | Luxembourg | −40 | 0 |

Budapest 1–5 (8) Stockholm 3–3 (12)
Luxembourg 1–1 (4) Paris 4–2 (14)
Stockholm 0–8 (8) Luxembourg 1–3 (6)
Budapest 2–4 (10) Paris 2–4 (10)
Stockholm 0–3 (3) Paris 0–13 (13)
Budapest 8–5 (29) Luxembourg 0–1 (1)

===== Phase 2 =====
Semi-final 1: 1st of pool A vs. 2nd of pool B
Den Haag 3–9 (18) Stockholm 2–2 (8)

Semi-final 2: 1st of pool B vs. 2nd of pool A
Paris 2–3 (9) Belgium 2–10 (16)

5th place final: 3rd of pool A vs. 3rd of pool B
Guernsey 2–4 (10) Budapest 5–3 (18)

3rd place final: loser of semi-final 1 vs. loser of semi-final 2
Paris won over Stockholm by forfeit

Final: winner of semi-final 1 vs. winner of semi-final 2
Den Haag 0–6 (6) Belgium 0–4 (4)

===== Points allowance for the tournament =====
| Rank | Team | Points |
|---|---|---|
| 1 | Den Haag | 25 |
| 2 | Belgium | 20 |
| 3 | Paris | 16 |
| 4 | Stockholm | 13 |
| 5 | Budapest | 11 |
| 6 | Guernsey | 10 |
| 7 | Luxembourg | 9 |

=== Shield ===
==== Table ====
After round 2

| Rank | Team | Round 1 | Round 2 | Round 3 | Total |
|---|---|---|---|---|---|
| 1 | Frankfurt Sarsfields | 20 | 11 | | 31 |
| 2 | Copenhagen | 11 | 16 | | 27 |
| 3 | Brussels Belgium B | 13 | 13 | | 26 |
| 4 | Jersey Irish | 25 | – | | 25 |
| - | Cumann Warszawa (Warsaw) | – | 25 | | 25 |
| 6 | Prague Hibernians | – | 20 | | 20 |
| 7 | Dogues Celtic FC (Saint-Malo) | 16 | – | | 16 |
| 8 | Amsterdam | – | 10 | | 10 |
| 9 | Vienna Gaels | – | 9 | | 9 |

==== Round 1 – Munich Tournament – 11 September ====
This tournament saw 5 teams participating. It has been played in round robin format followed by a 3rd/4th final and a Grand Final.

| Rank | Team | Score difference | Points |
|---|---|---|---|
| 1 | Jersey | +22 | 8 |
| 2 | Frankfurt | +9 | 4 |
| 3 | Saint-Malo | −15 | 4 |
| 4 | Belgium B | −4 | 2 |
| 5 | Copenhagen | −12 | 2 |

Belgium B forfeited their match against Jersey
Frankfurt 2–7 (13) Saint-Malo 1–0 (3)
Jersey 1–6 (9) Copenhagen 0–3 (3)
Frankfurt 1–6 (9) Belgium B 0–0 (0)
Copenhagen 0–3 (3) Saint-Malo 1–3 (6)
Jersey 1–8 (11) Frankfurt 0–4 (4)
Saint-Malo 1–4 (7) Belgium B 0–4 (4)
Frankfurt 1–3 (6) Copenhagen 2–5 (11)
Saint-Malo 0–1 (1) Jersey 2–6 (12)
Belgium B 3–3 (12) Copenhagen 3–1 (4)

===== Finals =====
Third place final
Saint-Malo 2–5 (11) Belgium B 0–4 (4)

Final
Jersey 4–10 (22) Frankfurt 0–2 (2)

===== Points allowance for the tournament =====
| Rank | Team | Points |
|---|---|---|
| 1 | Jersey Irish | 25 |
| 2 | Frankfurt Sarsfields | 20 |
| 3 | Dogues Celtic FC (Saint-Malo) | 16 |
| 4 | Brussels Belgium B | 13 |
| 5 | Copenhagen | 11 |

==== Round 2 – Budapest Tournament – 9 October ====
This tournament saw 7 teams participating. For the first part of the tournament, teams were drawn into 2 pools where each team played the other two or three (2 points for a win, 1 point for a draw, 0 for a loss). The top two teams of each group went on to play the semi-finals whereas the 3rd-placed team of each group played the 5th/6th ranking match.

===== Phase 1 =====
====== Pool A ======
| Rank | Team | Score Difference | Points |
|---|---|---|---|
| 1 | Prague | +23 | 4 |
| 2 | Warsaw | +1 | 2 |
| 3 | Frankfurt | −24 | 0 |

Frankfurt 2–5 (11) Prague 5–8 (23)
Prague 6–7 (25) Warsaw 3–5 (14)
Frankfurt 2–4 (10) Warsaw 5–7 (22)

====== Pool B ======
| Rank | Team | Score Difference | Points |
|---|---|---|---|
| 1 | Belgium B | +3 | 5 |
| 2 | Copenhagen | +10 | 3 |
| 3 | Amsterdam | −11 | 2 |
| 4 | Vienna | −2 | 2 |

Amsterdam 1–6 (9) Copenhagen 3–3 (12)
Belgium B 2–2 (8) Vienna 1–3 (6)
Copenhagen 2–2 (8) Belgium B 0–8 (8)
Amsterdam 0–5 (5) Vienna 0–4 (4)
Copenhagen 2–5 (11) Vienna 3–3 (12)
Amsterdam 1–5 (8) Belgium B 2–3 (9)

===== Phase 2 =====
Semi-final 1: 1st of pool A vs. 2nd of pool B
Prague 5–8 (23) Copenhagen 2–5 (11)

Semi-final 2: 1st of pool B vs. 2nd of pool A
Belgium B 3–2 (11) Warsaw 0–13 (13)

5th place final: 3rd of pool A vs. 3rd of pool B
Frankfurt won over Amsterdam by forfeit

3rd place final: loser of semi-final 1 vs. loser of semi-final 2
Copenhagen 1–5 (8) Belgium B 0–3 (3)

Final: winner of semi-final 1 vs. winner of semi-final 2
Prague 2–5 (11) Warsaw 0–11 (11) Warsaw won in the penalties shootout 5–4

===== Points allowance for the tournament =====
| Rank | Team | Points |
|---|---|---|
| 1 | Cumann Warszawa | 25 |
| 2 | Prague | 20 |
| 3 | Copenhagen | 16 |
| 4 | Belgium B | 13 |
| 5 | Frankfurt | 11 |
| 6 | Amsterdam | 10 |
| 7 | Vienna | 9 |

== See also ==
- Europe GAA
