= Paris Gaels GAA =

French Gaelic Athletic Association club

- Gaeil Páras CLG
- Founded: 1995
- County: Europe
- Nickname: Les Bleus
- Colours
- Grounds: Stade Louis Lumière

Playing kits
Standard colours

Paris Gaels GAA is a Gaelic Athletic Association (GAA) club based in Paris, France. It was the first Gaelic games club in continental Europe to be affiliated with the GAA.

== History ==
=== Origins ===
Gaelic games have a long, anecdotal history in Paris. The first recorded mention of Gaelic games was during the French revolution in 1789, when Irish priests from a seminary in central Paris were arrested while playing hurling on the outskirts of Paris. They were released soon afterwards after a translator had correctly explained that they were playing a game and not carrying out any military training or parades.

The club, which was founded officially in 1994, joined the Gaelic Athletic Association in 1995 becoming the first club to do so in continental Europe. However, Irish expats in Paris had been playing hurling and Gaelic football on a regular basis since the early 1980s. The mid-1990s in Europe saw Gaelic clubs being set up in nearly every capital city in Europe and the creation of the European County Board. Paris Gaels members were involved in the creation of the European County Board and in assisting several newer clubs to get up and running.

=== Early days ===
The mix of people involved in the club's early days included students, publicans, teachers, embassy staff and other professionals working for companies such the Irish Trade Board, Aer Lingus and some other non-governmental organisations. Much of the club's early activity was coordinated around the former Irish College in Paris, site of the current Centre Culturel Irlandais. In the summer of 1993, in the Champagne region of France, a Sports day was organised between Irish residents in Paris and the Luxembourg Irish association. A Gaelic football match was also organised by the Aer lingus GAA team and some of the Irish residents of Paris participated in that match. Some of the Irish residents from Paris involved that day decided that a sports society of some sort would benefit the Irish community in Paris.

The first official match of the club was a hurling fixture against Den Haag GAA, in May 1994 in La Courneuve, won by Paris. Buoyed by the success of the match against Den Haag, the Paris Gaels decided to go on the road. A club in Brussels had started, taking advantage of the growing number of Irish émigrés working in the EU institutions. In October 1994, at the British School of Paris, the Paris Gaels played Brussels GAA. It was also the first time that Paris played in their own jerseys. The match was a tight affair, the half time the scores were level, but Brussels pulled away in the second half.

The trip to Brussels was also the first time that the club's Ladies Football team played in a friendly match.

=== 2010 onwards ===
At the start of the 2010s, the club went through several changes. Up until 2009, most of the members and players had been Irish émigrés and students. However as Gaelic games, in particular Gaelic football, became more popular in France, new clubs started to appear in towns and cities like Lyon, Clermont, Niort, Rennes, Bordeaux and Toulouse. The sport started to attract new French players and, in 2009, approximately 15 new French players enrolled in both the Paris Gaels men's and ladies teams. At present, the majority of Paris Gaels players and members are from France or outside Ireland, while maintaining a sizeable contingent of players born in Ireland or with Irish backgrounds.

The club maintains a training schedule throughout the year, running weekly or biweekly training sessions in Gaelic football, hurling, camogie and handball at various locations around the city and suburbs of Paris.

== Honours ==
- French Men's Senior Football Championship: 6
  - 2006, 2007, 2008, 2009, 2014, 2018
- European Men's Senior Football Championship: 4
  - 2001, 2003, 2005, 2015
- French Ladies' Federal Football Championship: 1
  - 2022
- European Ladies' Senior Football Championship: 1
  - 2007
