= Gaelic Sports Club Luxembourg =

Athletic association in Luxembourg

- Keltish Spiller Lëtzebuerg
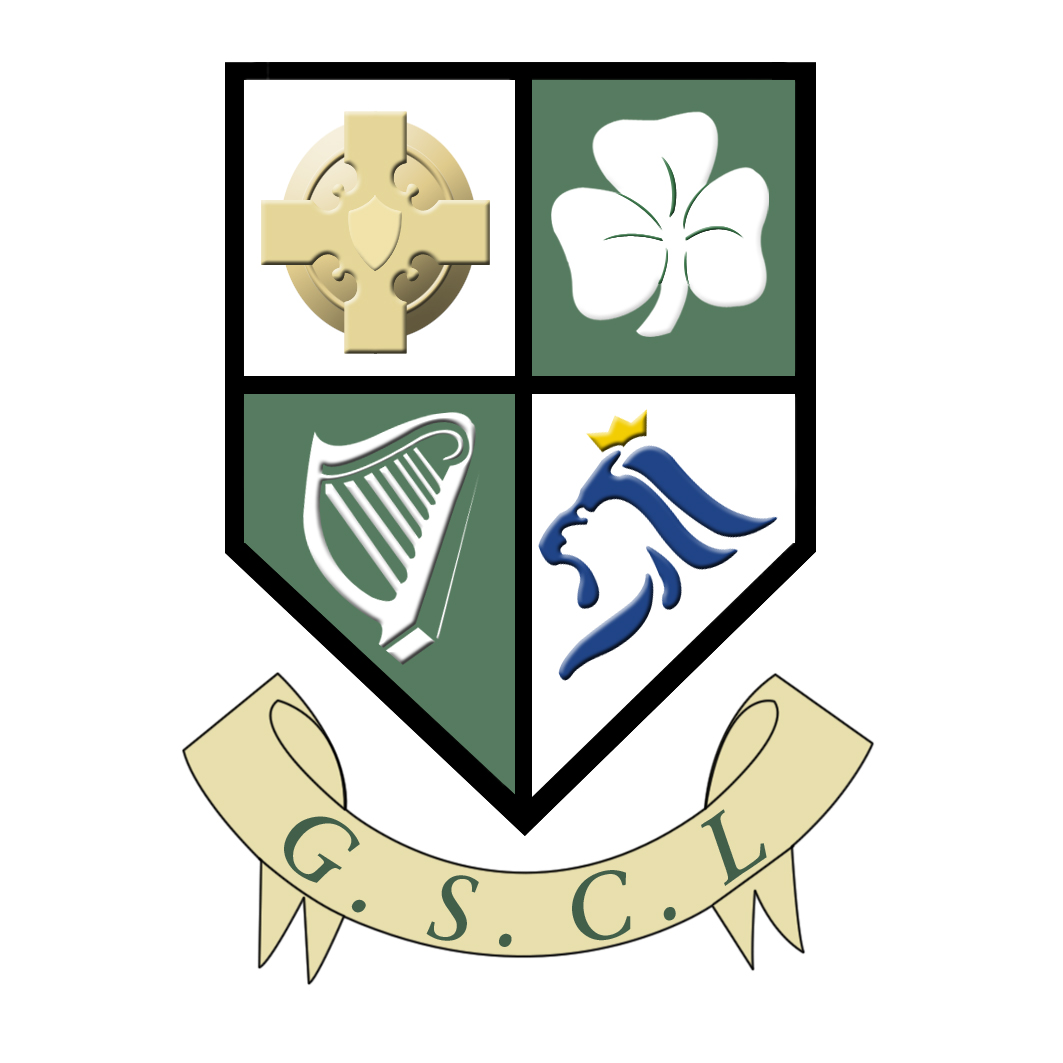
- Founded: 1978
- County: Europe
- Division: Benelux
- Colours: Bright Blue, White and Red
{{{kit1}}}

Gaelic Sports Club Luxembourg is a GAA club in Luxembourg. The club caters for Gaelic football, hurling and camogie.

== History ==
Hurling, football and camogie have been played by the Irish community in Luxembourg since the accession of Ireland to the European Economic Community in the early 1970s. The club was formally established in 1978. It is registered as an Association sans but lucratif with the Luxembourbourgish authorities.

The club became a founding member of the European County Board of the Gaelic Athletic Association (GAA) in 1999 and has participated in European competitions ever since.

The club has won four Ladies' Gaelic football championships, two camogie championships, two Gaelic football championship and five hurling championships.

== Honours ==
- 4 European Ladies Football Championships (2002, 2003, 2004, 2006)
- 2 European Football Championship (2007, 2016)
- 2 European Camogie Championships (2008, 2009)
- 5 European Hurling Championship (2008, 2017, 2022, 2023, 2024)

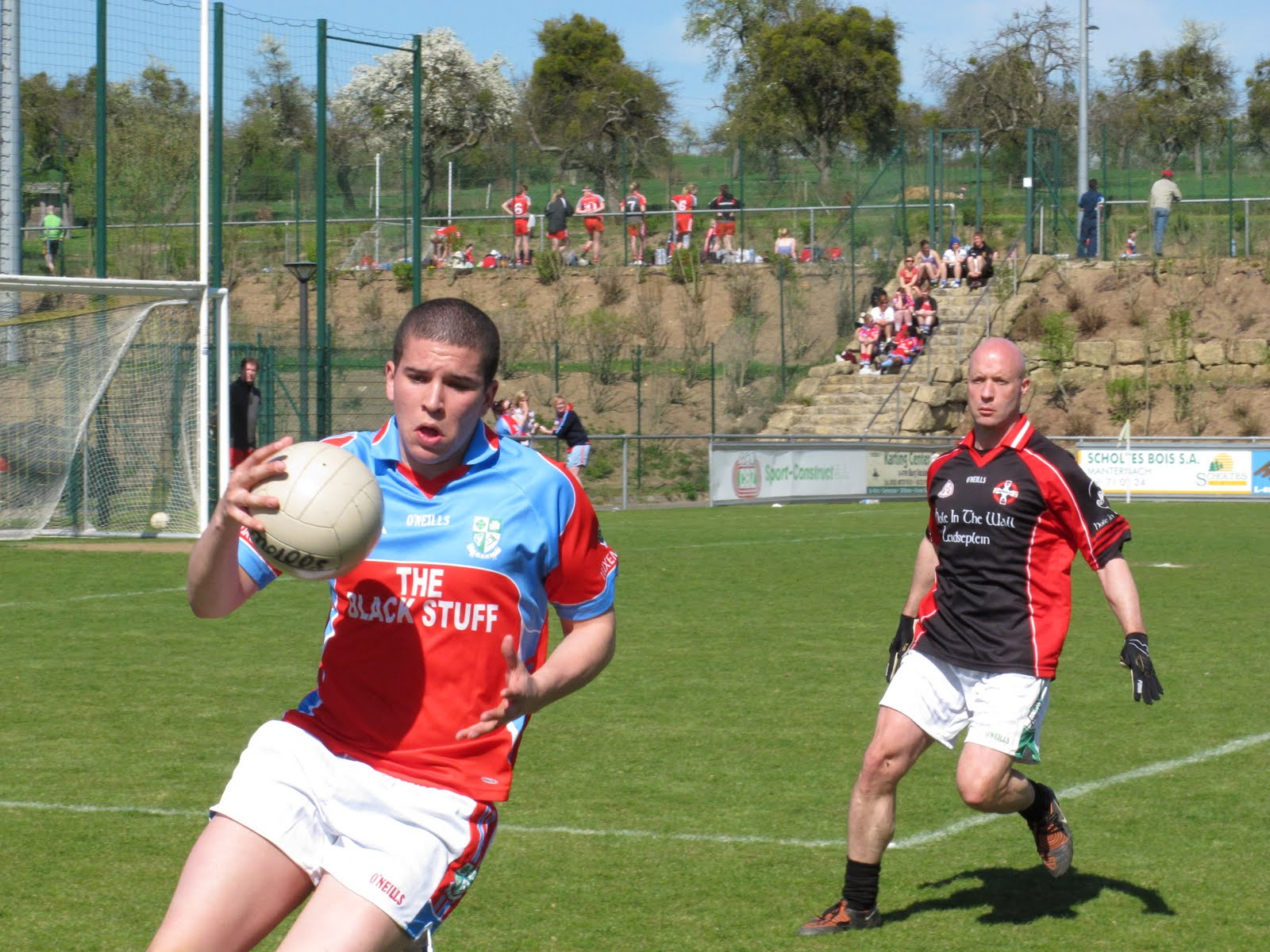
Men's Gaelic football team v Amsterdam GAC, Berbourg, April 2011

== See also ==
- List of Gaelic football clubs
- Sport in Luxembourg
