= Home School Hub =

Educational television programme in Ireland

- Also known as: RTÉ's Home School Hub
- Genre: Children's television series; Educational
- Presented by: Ray Cuddihy; Clíona Ní Chiosáin; John Sharpson; Emer O'Neill; Will Sliney
- Country of origin: Ireland
- Original languages: English, Irish
- No. of seasons: 1
- No. of episodes: 59

Production
- Running time: 60 minutes (Main show) (ISL-signed version); 15 minutes (Home School Extra)
- Production companies: RTÉ Television; Macalla Teoranta; (supported by) Mary I College

Original release
- Network: RTÉ2; RTÉ Junior; RTÉ Player
- Release: 30 March 2020 – 19 March 2021

RTÉ's Home School Hub, or simply Home School Hub, and its companion show Home School Extra, was an educational television programme which was created in response to the closure of all schools during the COVID-19 pandemic in Ireland in 2020. Announced on 21 March, it began broadcasting on RTÉ2 on 30 March, aimed at children attending 1st–6th class of primary school (i.e. roughly 6/7–12/13 years of age). The first series ended on 19 June. A new series After School Hub began on 11 October, broadcasting in the afternoon to cater for children whose parents are working from home. The series finished on 19 March 2021.

== Format ==
The hour-long main show, broadcast Monday-Friday at 11am, typically consisted of three lessons, one from each of the main presenters, (qualified teachers Múinteoirs (Note: "Múinteoir" is the Irish-language word for "Teacher", and a standard honorific for primary school teachers in Ireland) Clíona, Ray and John). As is standard for primary school education in Ireland, the teachers gave their lessons bilingually through English and Irish. In place of commercial breaks, the programme has smaller inserts from RTÉ-produced/commissioned educational programmes such as The Body Brothers, I'm an Animal, Pink Kong Studios' Urban Tails and Colm Tobin's Brain Freeze. Comic book artist Will Sliney also presents short drawing lessons in the "We Will Draw" segment.

A 15-minute-long compilation of material submitted by viewers relating to the content of recent shows, Home School Extra, narrated by Múinteoir Ray, was shown after the main show, and repeated at 4.15pm.

Irish Sign Language signed version of a previous main show has broadcast at 1pm from April to July.

== Presenters ==
- Ray Cuddihy – a puppeteer, actor and voice-artist, who had previously worked with RTÉ Junior
- Clíona Ní Chíosáin – an actress and television presenter known for TG4's Aifric
- John Sharpson – an actor, YouTuber and teacher
- Emer O'Neill – a physical education teacher, activist, and a former basketball player
- Séamus the dog – a puppet who has worked with RTÉjr

Cuddihy and Sharpson had previously worked together for their YouTube channel "Sharuf!", which features sketches, interviews and puppetry.

Smaller segments were presented by:

- Will Sliney, "We Will Draw" teaches drawing techniques
- Phil "Scientist Phil" Smyth, "Hub Lab" teaches science experiments to do at home
- Niamh Shaw, 'Space Hub' teaches space topics about planets, science and human missions past and present
- Dale McKay, beat boxing

== Guests ==
Guests on the show included:

- Lenny Abrahamson, director
- Dermot Bannon, architect and presenter of RTÉ's Room To Improve
- Thomas Barr, Olympic hurdler
- Sinéad Burke, teacher, fashion-designer and disability campaigner
- Eoin Colfer, author of Artemis Fowl
- Marita Conlon-McKenna, author of Under The Hawthorn Tree
- Gordon D'Arcy, former Irish rugby player
- Kenneth Egan, Olympic silver-medalist boxer
- Maeve Flynn, Dogs Trust Ireland
- Kellie Harrington, Amateur world-champion boxer
- Claire Lambe, Irish rower
- Rae Moore, award-winning architect
- Sene Naoupu, rugby player
- Shane O'Donoghue, Irish national team hockey player, olympian
- Dave Rudden, writer of young adult fiction
- Niamh Shaw, scientist and space expert for RTE with an aim to go to space as communicator and writer
- Allie Sherlock, YouTuber and busker, discussed busking, and played with the RTÉ Concert Orchestra as part of the final episode
- Greta Streimikyte, Paralympic middle-distance runner
- Ryan Tubridy, RTÉ Radio 1 presenter and host of The Late Late Show and The Late Late Toy Show
- Iseult Ward, co-founder and CEO of Food Cloud
- Sarah Webb, award-winning children's writer
- Bus Éireann
- Children's Health Foundation, Crumlin
- The Dublin Fire Brigade
- Dublin Zoo
- Garda Síochána
- Irish Naval Service

== Production ==
The show was produced by Dublin-Based Television and Film production company, Macalla Teoranta and shot in Scoil Lorcáin, a national school in Monkstown, Dublin.

== Cúla4 Ar Scoil ==
TG4, Ireland's Irish language television service launched its equivalent show Cúla4 Ar Scoil ("Cúla 4 at School") in April 2020. It was recorded in Connemara, with teachers Caitriona Ní Chualain and Fiachra O Dubhghaill. The service continued in September for the new school year, with Ní Chualáin, Orla Ní Fhinneadha, Micheál Ó Dubhghaill, Síle Ní Chonghaile, Caitríona McAtee and Joe Ó hEachtairn, though most schools had returned to operation.
