= Basel GAA =

- Founded: 2015
- County: Europe

Playing kits
Standard colours

Basel GAA is a Gaelic games club based in Basel, Switzerland.

The club was founded in 2015, and is affiliated to the Gaelic Athletic Association through Gaelic Games Europe. A youth section was launched in 2019.

The club plays hurling and camogie in the Pan-European championship and Gaelic football in the Central/East championship.
