= Clíona Ní Chiosáin =

Irish actress, teacher and television presenter

Clíona Ní Chiosain
- Born: 12 April 1990 (age 34); Ireland
- Occupation(s): Actor, radio host
- Years active: 2006–present

Clíona Ní Chiosáin (born 12 April 1990) is an Irish actress, television presenter, and teacher, known as the star of TG4's Aifric 2006–2008, and as a presenter of RTÉ's Home School Hub from March 2020 to March 2021. Aifric has been shown on BBC Alba where it was dubbed in Scottish Gaelic. Ní Chiosáin has starred, or appeared in, a number of other Irish-language productions and hosted a radio show.

== Roles ==
In Aifric, Ní Chiosáin starred as the 13- to 14-year-old title character. The series revolves around Aifric's family of urban Irish speakers (Gaeilgeoirí) who have recently moved to a Gaeltacht area in the west of Ireland. Her family is quite eccentric and unorthodox. Aifric however is a sensible yet self-conscious character and who, in spite of her family, wishes to be normal. She is very conscious about doing anything that may be embarrassing. Given the nature of her family, avoiding embarrassment becomes an uphill struggle, with an entertaining outcome. The show also focuses on her first kiss and the associated difficulties. In 2008, Ní Chiosáin was nominated for an Irish Film and Television Academy award for her role in Aifric.

Other minor TV roles include the show Scúp, another TG4 production. This was shown on TG4 and BBC Northern Ireland. She was also interviewed on the RTÉ2 show Two Tube.

Ní Chiosáin and her sister hosted Speig Neanta, a radio show on Dublin's Irish-language station Raidio na Life, which runs every Saturday. A notable event from the show was a prank call made by RTÉ 2fm's Cormac Battle purporting to be the famous Irish musician Hozier. During the interview "Hozier" uncharacteristically bragged about his achievements and attempted to ask Ní Chiosain out on a date. She eventually realised that it was a hoax but took it in good part.

In theatre, Ní Chiosáin appeared in the play Réiltín in the Abbey Theatre. This was another Irish language play and is a modern production. It focuses on a young girl's attempt to win fame as a singer entirely through Irish language rock songs in both Ireland and Britain. The production itself was subject to criticism, with an Irish Independent review commenting that the play had "No clear plot and little direction as Cliona Ní Chiosain spins about to a backing track of aped Britpop, keening over her failed love affairs with music and with her man. Occasionally falling over and singing from behind a mop of hair it's 50 minutes of extreme karaoke." The review notes, however, that Cliona Ní Chiosain "tries admirably" with most criticism directed against the plot. This play premiered in America and was part of the Dublin Theatre Festival.

Ní Chiosán also starred in Fíbín's production of the Irish play An Triail, a well-known drama by Máiréad Ní Ghráda. Ní Chiosain played the character of Máire, the young mother who is abandoned by 1960s Irish society. This production received some acclaim, being described as a "creative and vibrant interpretation of Máiréad Ní Ghráda's play" by the Irish Theatre Magazine.

== Presenter ==
Ní Chiosán has presented shows for RTÉ Two. Tír na nÓg is a bi-lingual woodland-based nature program. She was chosen as one of the presenters of RTÉ's Home School Hub, an educational programme produced to aid primary school students during the COVID-19 lockdown in March 2020.

== Personal life ==
Ní Chiosáin was raised in an Irish-speaking family. She attended an Irish-medium primary school in Leixlip, County Kildare, named Scoil Chearbhaill Uí Dhálaigh. She has been an ambassador for TG4 and the Irish language.

She has spoken passionately about peer pressure on young people and has launched a website (B4UDecide.ie) about under-age sex and teen pregnancy. She commented on the matter, "This will be a lifeline for so many people. With more websites like this peer pressure can be eliminated."
