= Aifric =

Irish-language TV series

- Genre: Drama; Comedy-drama; Teen drama
- Created by: Tadhg Mac Dhonnagáin; Paul Mercier; Micheal ó Domhnaill
- Developed by: Tadhg Mac Dhonnagáin; Paul Mercier
- Starring: Clíona Ní Chiosáin; Kevin O'Dwyer; Mairéad Coneely; Barry Barnes; Gráinne Bleasdale; Sláine Hutchinson
- Country of origin: Ireland
- Original language: Irish

Production
- Camera setup: Single-Camera
- Running time: 25 minutes

Original release
- Network: TG4
- Release: November 2, 2006 – November 25, 2008

Aifric (Irish pronunciation: [ˈafʲɾʲɪc]) is an Irish-language TV series aimed at young adults, co-created and written by Tadhg Mac Dhonnagáin and co-created and directed by Paul Mercier. The show has won multiple IFTA awards for "Best Children's/Youth Program".

The first of the weekly thirteen-part series began broadcasting on 31 October 2006, the date of TG4's tenth anniversary.

== Premise ==
The series followed the life of Aifric whose wacky family have just moved to a new town in the West of Ireland. The 14-year-old wants nothing more than to fit in but feels her family will not make it easy for her. Her mother is a new-age hippie who has banned television, while her father is a wannabe rock star, and her little brother is just annoying.

== Cast and characters ==
- Clíona Ní Chiosáin as Aifric de Spáinn, a shy and quirky teenage girl.
- Kevin O'Dwyer as Traolach de Spáinn, Aifric's younger brother. He is an intelligent and quirky child with a keen interest in Eastern philosophy.
- Mairéad Coneely as Janis de Spáinn, Aifric and Traolach's mother.
- Barry Barnes as Tom de Spáinn, Aifric and Traolach's father. He is an accountant by profession but rock musician by aspiration.
- Gráinne Bleasdale as Sophie, Aifric's best friend.
- Sláine Hutchinson as Claudia, Aifric's blonde rival. She is wealthy, arrogant, and selfish.
- Josef Hrehorow as Maidhc, Aifric's classmate who has a crush on her.
- Cárthach Bán Breathnach as Jimín, Maidhc's right-hand man and the chief messer.
- Eoin O'Dubhghaill as Bertie, a strange boy with an odd fondness for jellyfish.
- Colin Murray as Beartla, Aifric's classmate. He is the seemingly attainable "Hottie" of the group.
- Dónall Ó Héalai as Jeaic, a boy whom Aifric had a crush on in season 1.
- Christy Leech as Leo, the "surfer dude" of the series, whom Aifric had a crush on at the start of season 2.
- Gráinne Pollack as Bróna, an eccentric classmate of Aifric's. She has few (if any) friends and plays the cymbals.

== Episodes ==
=== Season 1 (2006) ===
No. overall	No. in season	Title	Written by	Original release date
1	1	"Codlach na hOiche"	Róise Goan & Tadhg Mac Dhonnagáin	October 31, 2006

== Broadcast ==
As well as on TG4, Aifric has also been shown on BBC Alba, where it was dubbed into Scottish Gaelic. It was also shown on HBO Latin America where it was dubbed into Portuguese and Spanish, and on Brezhoweb where it was dubbed into Breton.

== Trivia ==
- Over 95% of the production budget was spent in the Galway region.
- The production employed over 170 crew and a cast of almost 150 actors.
- In August 2004, there was a national talent search which auditioned hopeful teenagers for the many young roles in the show, including that of Aifric.

== Awards and nominations ==
Aifric won best Children's/Youth programme at the 2007, 2008 and 2009 Irish Film and Television Awards, and was nominated for Best Irish Language show. In 2009, it won best Youth programme at the Celtic Film and Media Festival.
