= Setanta Berlin GAA =

GAA club in Berlin

Berlin
- Setanta Berlin GAA
- Founded: 2015
- County: Europe
- Colours
- Grounds: Berlin, Germany
- Coordinates: 52.4900°N 13.3989°E

Playing kits
Standard colours

Setanta Berlin GAA is a GAA club in Berlin, Germany which caters for both youths and adults. The club plays hurling and camogie at BSC Eintracht / Südring, Clubheim Willi Boos in Kreuzberg. The club, which was founded in 2015, competes in Gaelic games in the European Championship.

== Honours ==
In 2019, four German-born Setanta players represented Europe Rovers / Germany in camogie and hurling in the 2019 World Championships in Waterford.

== See also ==
- Gaelic Games Europe
- Deutscher Bund Gälischer Sportarten
- List of Gaelic games clubs outside Ireland
