= Éire Óg Sevilla =

- Éire Óg Sevilla
- Founded: 2009
- County: Europe
- Nickname: Los verdirojos
- Colours: Red and green
- Grounds: San Jerónimo club

Playing kits
Standard colours

Éire Óg Sevilla is a GAA club based in Seville (Andalusia). Established on St Patrick's Day of 2009, they play in green and red jerseys, black shorts and black socks.

== History ==
Founded in 2009, the club's founders are from Ardmore in County Waterford and Raheeny in Dublin.

In February 2010, the club played its first friendly match, an away game against Marbella Costa Gaels. Then in March it fielded a team in the first round of the Iberian championship in Marbella. On 8 May 2010, they competed in the 3rd round of the Iberian Championships in Madrid, they lost to St Vincent Valencia at the semi-final stage.

In 2011, Éire Óg hosted their first ever round of Iberian Championship, on 19 February. They came through the group stages and lost to Barcelona Gaels at the semi-final stage. They were beaten after extra-time in a 3rd/4th place play-off with Madrid Harps. In April 2011, the team travelled to Madrid and came through the group stages once again only to be beaten into 3rd yet again by Madrid. On 28 May 2011, the team travelled to Valencia to play the 4th round and started with a win against A Coruña but were beaten by teams representing Barcelona, Madrid and Valencia in the group stages.

2012 saw the formation of the Ladies team. The club started the year by hosting the first round with the Men's team losing by a point to Madrid Harps in the final and the Ladies won their final against Valencia. The team travelled to Madrid in April 2012 to compete in a tournament. The men's team reached the final after defeating Barcelona in the semi-final. The ladies team also came through their group and semi-final, so both teams were in the final. The ladies were narrowly beaten by Madrid. The men played next and beat Madrid to win their first ever final.

In January 2013, the club received international attention after exhibiting Gaelic football to a crowd watching a La Liga soccer match between Sevilla and Granada.

As of 2013, Éire Óg Sevilla were competing in the newly formed Andalusian league, competing against Costa Gaels Marbella and Gibraltar Gaels. Gibraltar Gaels were the first winners of the event. Sevilla and Costa Gaels amalgamated to form the Andalucía Rebels to compete in the Madrid round of the Iberian championship in June where they were beaten by Barcelona in the semi-final.

Nearby clubs include Costa Gaels and Gibraltar Gaels.

In 2016, the men's team played in an international championship in Madrid against teams from Valencia, Madrid, Galicia and Barcelona.

In early 2017, the women's team hosted their first international invitational tournament against teams from Spain, Belgium and Ireland, ultimately taking second place in the competition.

== See also ==
- List of Gaelic games clubs outside Ireland
