= Dave Rudden =

Irish writer

- Born: 13 February 1988 (age 38); County Cavan, Ireland
- Education: University College Dublin (M.A. 2013), St Patrick's College, Dublin (B.A.)
- Occupation: Writer
- Writing career
- Language: English
- Genres: Young adult fiction; juvenile fantasy; science fiction
- Notable work: Knights of the Borrowed Dark trilogy (2016–2018)
- Notable awards: 2016 Irish Book Award for Best Senior Children's Book: Knights of the Borrowed Dark
- Website: daverudden.com

Dave Rudden (born 13 February 1988) is an Irish writer of young adult fiction, juvenile fantasy and science fiction, best known for his Knights of the Borrowed Dark trilogy and stories from the Doctor Who universe. He is based in Dublin.

== Early life and education ==
Born on 13 February 1988 in County Cavan, Rudden is from Bawnboy, where he attended St Aidan's National School and St Mogue's College. He studied a Bachelor of Arts degree in English in St Patrick's College, Dublin, and graduated from University College Dublin, obtaining Master of Arts degree in creative writing in 2013. As a young author he won the Fantasy Book Review short story competition (2011) and one of Literary Death Matches in Dublin (2014).

== Knights of the Borrowed Dark trilogy ==
Rudden debuted as a novelist in 2016 with Knights of the Borrowed Dark, described by the Internet Speculative Fiction Database as juvenile fantasy. The book was reviewed by The Bulletin of the Center for Children's Books, School Library Journal, The Irish Times and The Guardian, in which S. F. Said called it "a magical debut". It won the 2016 Irish Book Award for Best Senior Children's Book and the 2016 Great Reads Award for "Most Read" title. It was selected by the city of Dublin for its UNESCO-affiliated 2017 Citywide Reading Campaign for Children. According to figures compiled by Public Lending Remuneration the novel was one of top 20 books borrowed from public libraries in Ireland in 2017.

The Irish National Council for Curriculum and Assessment chose Knights of the Borrowed Dark for the Junior Cycle English Indicative First Year Text List (2021–2023). It is the first part of the series continued with The Forever Court (2017), shortlisted for the 2017 Irish Book Award for Best Senior Children's Book, and The Endless King (2018). The trilogy is currently being developed into a film by Arvind Ethan David.

== Doctor Who books and stories ==
Since 2018, Rudden has been writing science fiction books set in the Doctor Who universe, at the invitation of the franchise's custodians at Puffin Books and the BBC. Combining various elements of the Doctor Who universe, they were initially two collections of short stories. Doctor Who: Twelve Angels Weeping, released in October 2018, was the first Doctor Who book to feature the Thirteenth Doctor from the television series. It was shortlisted for the 2018 Irish Book Award for Best Teen & Young Adult Book. Rudden's third Doctor Who book, Doctor Who: Wannabes: A 1990s Story (2023), featuring the Tenth Doctor and Donna Noble, is a novel in the six-book Decades Collection celebrating the 60th anniversary of the series.

== Other literary activities ==
Rudden was Writer-In-Residence at Marino Institute of Education in Dublin in 2018–2019 and was appointed Writer-In-Residence at Dublin City University for 2022. During the COVID-19 pandemic, he regularly collaborated with the educational television programme RTÉ's Home School Hub, bringing writing tips and motivation to a national audience. He mentors emerging writers through Irish Writers Centre's National Mentoring Programme and serves as one of "Ireland Reads" campaign ambassadors. In 2023, he was nominated for the 2024 Astrid Lindgren Memorial Award as one of four nominees from Ireland.

Sister Wake, the first book of Rudden's new fantasy trilogy, intended for an adult audience, was released by Hodderscape in January 2026.

== Bibliography ==
=== Knights of the Borrowed Dark trilogy ===
- Knights of the Borrowed Dark. London: Puffin Books. 2016. ISBN 978-0-1413-5660-0. – First American edition New York: Random House. 2016. ISBN 978-0-5535-2297-6.
- The Forever Court. London: Puffin Books. 2017. ISBN 978-0-1413-5661-7. – First American edition New York: Random House. 2017. ISBN 978-0-5535-2301-0.
- The Endless King. London: Puffin Books. 2018. ISBN 978-0-1413-5662-4. – First American edition New York: Random House. 2018. ISBN 978-0-5535-2305-8.

=== Stories from the Doctor Who universe ===
- Doctor Who: Twelve Angels Weeping. London: BBC Children's Books. 2018. ISBN 978-1-4059-3827-3.
- The Wintertime Paradox: Festive Stories from the World of Doctor Who. London: Puffin Books. 2020. ISBN 978-1-4059-4610-0.
- Doctor Who: Wannabes. A 1990s Story. London: BBC Children's Books. 2023. ISBN 978-1-4059-5702-1.

=== Tales of Darkisle series ===
- Conn of the Dead. Tales of Darkisle. Book 1. Dublin: Gill Books. 2025. ISBN 978-1-8045-8208-4.
- Nell on Earth. Book 2. Dublin: Gill Books. 2026 ISBN 978-1-80458-210-7
