= Ascaro Rovigo Gaelic Football =

Italian athletic club

Ascaro Rovigo GF
- Founded: 2012
- County: Europe
- Colours: Red and blue
- Grounds: Rovigo, Italy

Playing kits
Standard colours

Ascaro Rovigo Gaelic Football is a Gaelic Athletic Association (GAA) club based in Rovigo, Italy. The club plays mainly Gaelic Football. Founded on 1 June 2012, it is the first and oldest Gaelic Football club in Italy and one of only three Italian football clubs recognized by Europe GAA, the European branch of Gaelic Athletic Association. Ascaro Rovigo plays against Padova Rovigo twice a year in the "Adige Cup." The first "Adige Cup" was the first Gaelic Football match ever played in Italy in 2012.

Ascaro Rovigo plays in the Swiss/Italy Championship along with Padova and Lazio. In 2013 they reached third place. The club's colours are red and blue and the kits are supplied by O'Neills.
