= Tadhg Mac Dhonnagáin =

TV personality

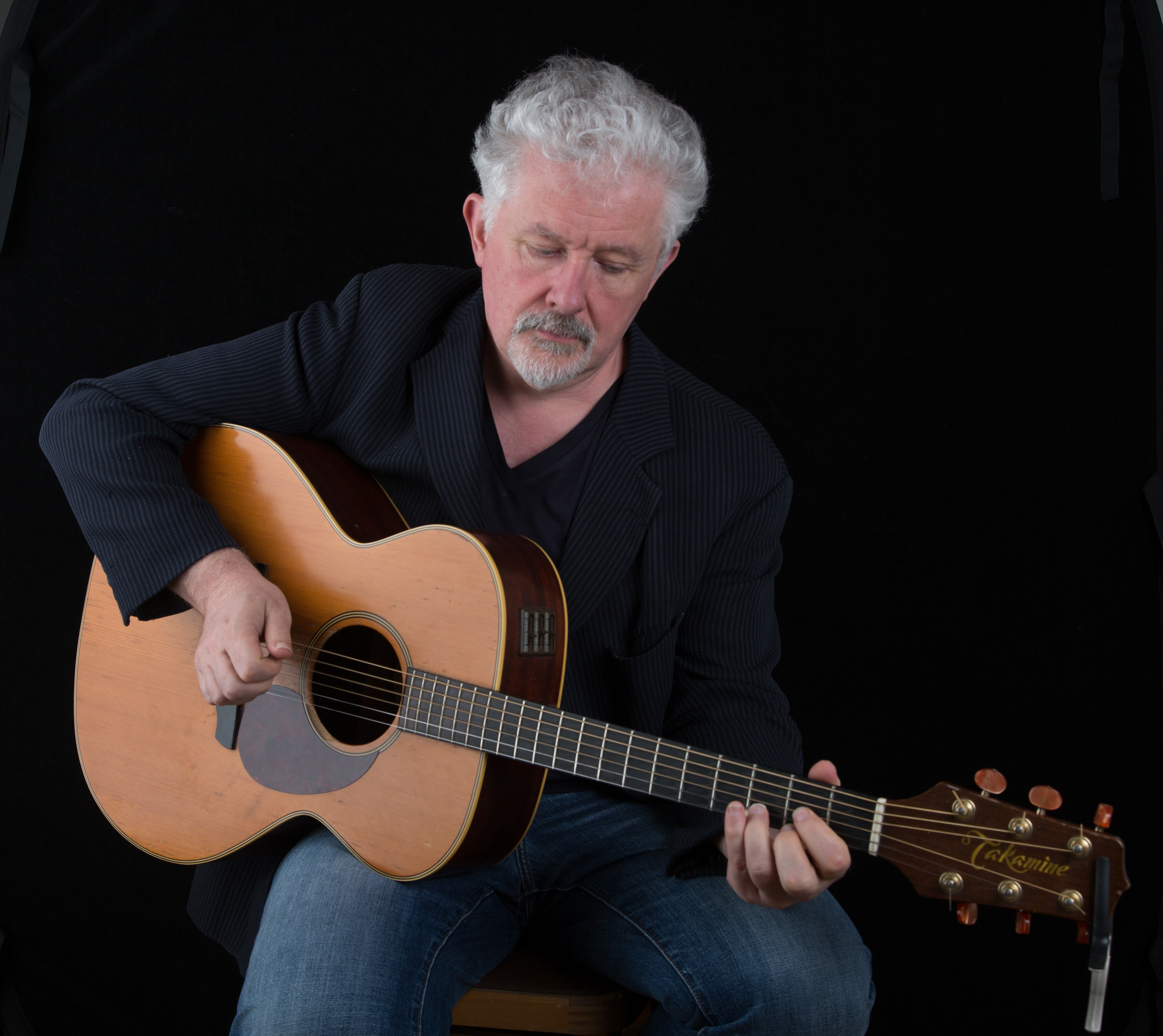
Tadhg Mac Dhonnagáin Grianghraf: Seán Ó Mainnín

Tadhg Mac Dhonnagáin is a writer, musician and publisher, originally from Aghamore, County Mayo in Ireland.

== Biography ==
Born in 1961 and educated in St Louis Community School, Kiltimagh, he graduated from St Patrick's College, Dublin, in 1982. He taught in County Kildare for five years in Gaelscoil Uí Dhálaigh, an Irish-medium primary school in Leixlip. In 1984, Mac Dhonnagáin was invited to present children's programme Dilín ó Deamhas on RTÉ Television and in 1987 he left teaching to become a presenter/reporter on the Irish language features programme, Cúrsaí. In 1995, a weekly arts edition of the show Cúrsaí Ealaíne began to air, with Mac Dhonnagáin co-presenting. Cúrsaí Ealaíne won an Irish Film and Television Awards award in 2000 for best TV Features series.

Mac Dhonnagáin, a guitarist and singer, also recorded two albums while living in Dublin: Solas Gorm, a tongue-in-cheek blues collection, and Raiftéirí san Underground, a collection in Irish and English.

With the creation of TG4 in 1996 and the concomitant rise of an Irish-language television industry in the West of Ireland, Mac Dhonnagáin resettled in the Conamara Gaeltacht in 2000, where he continues to work freelance as a screenwriter, most notably the Irish Film and Television Awards and Celtic Media Festival, award-winning teenage drama show Aifric. The show has been dubbed and broadcast in seven languages worldwide.

== Author and publisher ==
Mac Dhonnagáin is the author of a number of award-winning books, including Gugalaí Gug! a CD/book collection of traditional children's rhymes from the Conamara tradition, awarded a Gold Disc in 2013. His book, Madame Lazare, won 'Irish Language Book of the Year' at the 2021 Irish Book Awards.

His literary biography for adults of Antoine Ó Raifteirí, Mise Raiftearaí an Fíodóir Focal, was awarded Gradam Uí Shúilleabháin, Irish-language book of the year award, 2015. The project began life as a drama-documentary script, for TG4 television, which Mac Dhonnagáin also presented. The film, Mise Raiftearaí an Fíodóir Focal, produced by Léirithe Sónta, was broadcast on TG4 in December 2010.

'Bliain na nAmhrán', a song collection for children, published in book/CD form, won the Children's Books Ireland Judges' Honour Award at the Children's Book of the Year Awards, 2017.

Mac Dhonnagáin is also the owner/director of a book publishing house, Futa Fata, which publishes in the main material for children. The company has over 100 books in print, a mix of work originated by Irish writers and illustrators as well as inward translations from French, German and English. Futa Fata also sells rights of its original publications internationally; its book have been published in eleven languages across the world.

In 2007 Mac Dhonnagáin was named Uachtarán an Oireachtais, an honorary title given by the Irish language festival Oireachtas na Gaeilge, which was being held in Westport that year.

Tadhg Mac Dhonnagáin lives in An Spidéal, Conamara.
