= C.L.G. Den Haag =

- Founded: 1979
- County: Europe
- Division: Benelux
- Nickname: Hags
- Colours: Yellow and black
- Grounds: Westlandse Rugby Club Haaglanden; The Hague
{{{kit1}}}

Gaelic football
- European: 4

C.L.G. Den Haag is the most successful GAA club in the Netherlands. They are also continental Europe's most successful Gaelic football club, having won the European Gaelic Football Championship four times (including 2010) and having finished runner-up in 2011.

Each year the club hosts an 11 a-side European Invitational Gaelic Football Tournament.

They also do hurling. Declan Bonner from Donegal was awarded the 2009 Den Haag Hurler of the Year.

== See also ==
- List of Gaelic games clubs outside Ireland
