= Hamburg GAA =

Hamburg
- Hamburg GAA
- Founded: 2015
- Colours
- Grounds: Hamburg, Germany
- Coordinates: 53.335°N 10.000°E

Playing kits
Standard colours

Hamburg GAA is a GAA club in Hamburg, Germany. The club runs Gaelic football sessions at Stadtpark and hurling/camogie at Hochschulsport Hamburg facilities. The club competes in Gaelic Games Europe competitions.

== History ==
The club was founded in summer 2015. The club crest is made up of Hamburg’s colours (red and blue) and shows a castle with three towers and two Marian stars, which are said to symbolise the fact that Hamburg used to be an archbishopric.

== Honours ==
- On Saturday 11 March 2017 the chairman of Hamburg GAA Stephen O'Rourke presented a signed Hamburg GAA jersey to the EPIC The Irish Emigration Museum. The jersey is intended to be displayed in the museum's Gaelic Games Gallery, which acknowledges the work done by GAA clubs around the globe.
- Hosted the 2nd round of the European Hurling Championship 2017 in Hamburg
- German Camogie and Hurling champions 2018 and 2019

== See also ==
- Gaelic Games Europe
- List of Gaelic games clubs outside Ireland
- Hurling
- Camogie
- Gaelic football
