= Berlin GAA =

- Cumann Lúthchleas Gael Beirlín
- Founded: 2014
- County: Europe
- Colours
- Grounds: Schillerpark Wedding, Sportanlage Jungfernheide
- Coordinates: 52°33′16″N 13°21′11″E

Playing kits
Standard colours

Berlin GAA is a Gaelic Athletic Association club based in Berlin, Germany. Founded in 2014, the club fields adult teams in men's and ladies' Gaelic football, hurling, and camogie.

== History ==
Berlin GAA is the longest-established GAA club in Berlin. Founded in 2014 by Kerry native Christopher Hennessy, the club began as a casual kick-around between Christopher and his son on the grounds of Tempelhofer Feld. Since its founding over a decade ago, the club has grown rapidly, fielding competitive adult teams in men's and ladies' Gaelic football, hurling, and camogie.

Christopher did not get to see how impressively the club blossomed since its founding, passing away less than one year after the club's establishment. The German National Hurling Cup is named in his honour.

Since its foundation in 2014, Berlin GAA has developed in a multicultural community that is welcoming to players of all levels seeking to play Gaelic games in the German capital.

== Honours list ==
Men's European Senior Football Championship (15 a side)

- 2019

Ladies Central East European Football Championship

- 2019, 2026

Men's Central East European Football Championship

- 2018, 2019, 2022, 2024, 2025, 2026

German Hurling Cup (Chris Hennessy Cup)

- 2015, 2017

German Camogie Cup (Sebastian Rießbeck Cup)

- 2017, 2026
