= Gaelic Games Europe =

Unit of the Gaelic Athletic Association

- Nickname(s): GGE
- Founded: 22 November 1999; 26 years ago
- Dominant sport: Dual county
- Ground(s): Sportspark West, Negenputruwe 1-5, 6218 RA, Maastricht, Netherlands
- County colours: Blue Yellow
- Website: gaelicgameseurope.com

Clubs
- Total: 114
- SFC champions: Barcelona Gaels
- SHC champions: Amsterdam GAC

Regular kit

The European Board of the Gaelic Athletic Association or Gaelic Games Europe is one of the international units (outside of Ireland) of the Gaelic Athletic Association (GAA), and is responsible for organising Gaelic games in continental Europe. Gaelic Games Europe is also responsible for the European Gaelic football, hurling, camogie and ladies' Gaelic football teams which compete every three years at the GAA World Gaelic Games.

While sporadic attempts were made to form clubs and organise competitions, the first five clubs (Brussels, C.L.G. Den Haag, Luxembourg, Paris Gaels, and Guernsey Gaels) were organised into a 'County' Board at a meeting on 22 November 1999 organised by Joe McDonagh, the then president of the GAA. Since then, growth has resulted in over 100 clubs spread across 24 countries, catering for over 5,000 players who play camogie, hurling, men's and ladies football and handball competitions.

The European County Board (ECB) changed its name to Gaelic Games Europe at the Annual Convention in Leuven (Belgium) in November 2016.

== Structure ==
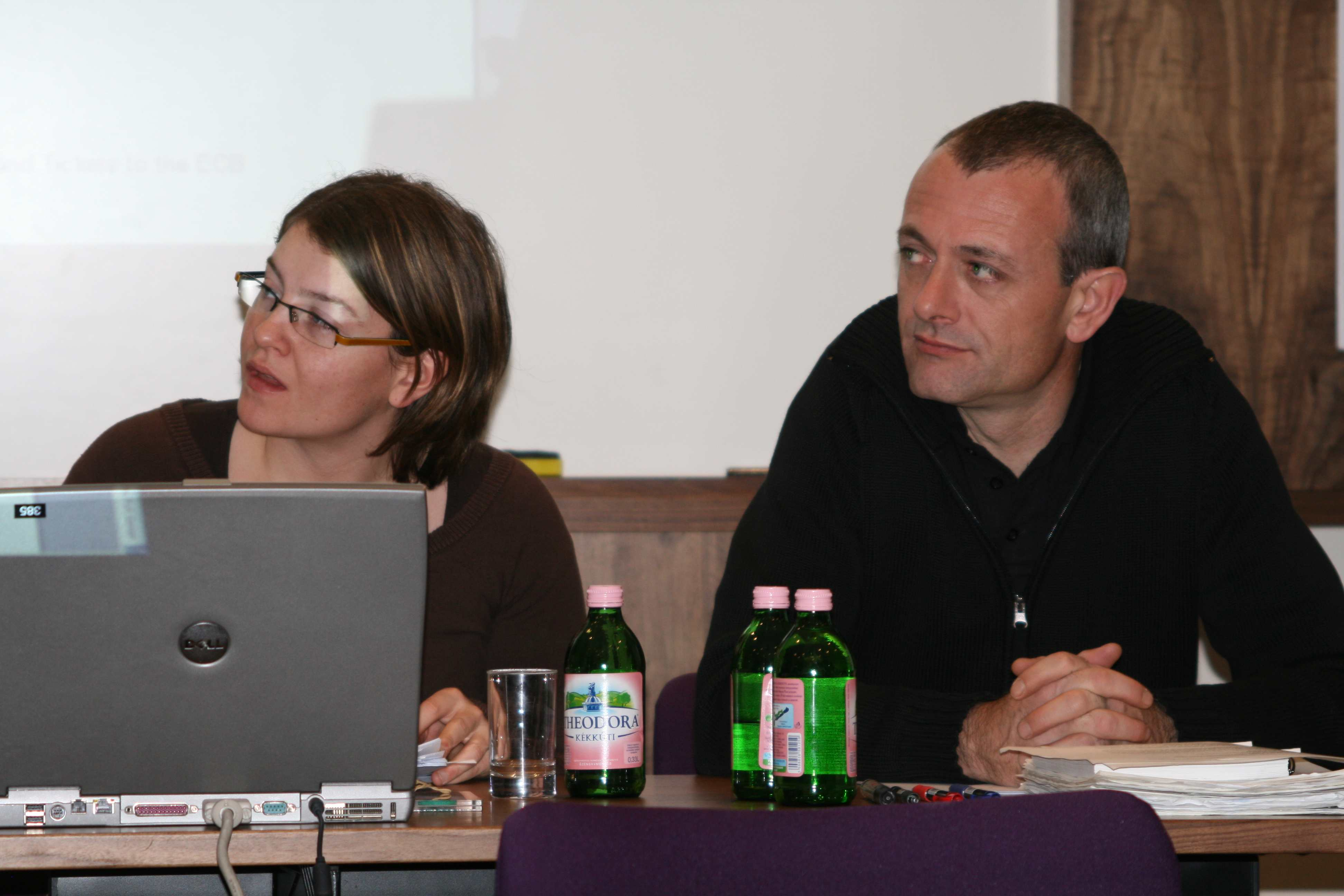
Eileen Jennings (Chp) & Tony Bass (Sec) at 2007 European GAA Convention in Budapest

Gaelic Games Europe governance structures are based on a volunteer culture. Any member can submit a motion to their club's annual general meeting suggesting new policies, amendments to an existing policy or propose changes to the playing rules. If approved, the motion is discussed at the Gaelic Games Europe Annual Convention.

Each club can send delegates to the annual convention which is the main decision making body for Gaelic games in Europe. At the convention, delegates discuss issues, decide on motions and elect people to serve on committees.

Two members of European clubs have been recognised for their long service and dedication to developing Gaelic games. Mary Gavin, who founded Den Haag GAA club in 1979 and was involved in the establishment of the European Board in 1999, received a GAA Presidents Award in 2013. The Camogie Association also named their World Gaelic Games trophy in her honour in 2019. Tony Bass, a GAA administrator and referee, was secretary of Cuala GAA club and served on various Dublin GAA county and Leinster Council committees before moving to the Netherlands and establishing the Maastricht Gaels club in 2004 was recognised with a GAA President's Award in 2021. Bass has been GGE chairperson, secretary, development officer and represented Europe on the GAA Central Council and at multiple GAA, LGFA and Camogie congresses.

== Regions ==
Clubs across Europe are assigned to a "region". Each region elects a "Regional Committee" which is responsible for organising competitions and developing Gaelic games in their area. The GGE Management (MC) or European (EC) Committees may delegate other tasks. Regions elect one EC representative each and are also represented on many sub-committees. There are five regions, Benelux, East and Central, Iberia, North West and Nordics, two of which are divided into "sub-regions".

In the wake of Russia's invasion of Ukraine, the Minister for Sport in Ireland Jack Chambers signed a statement that Russian based athletes and administrators should be banned from participation and representation internationally. Almost all sporting organisations within Europe have adhered to this policy. Support for this policy was reaffirmed in February 2023 by the new Irish Minister for Sport Thomas Byrne, who stated "Pending an improved situation in Ukraine, I urge the sports movement to stay the course and continue to exclude those that are not respecting such important instruments in the international sporting landscape as the Olympic Truce.” Despite this, Russian based teams and administrators enjoy full membership of Gaelic Games Europe. In the aftermath of controversial comments regarding war crimes in Ukraine by a Russian based administrator of Gaelic Games Europe, the GAA issued a statement that the comments were made “in a personal capacity and do not reflect the views of the GAA”. The administrator however remained a member of management committee of Gaelic Games Europe.

As of 2023, the regions were:

Regions	Sub-regions	Counties in region
Benelux	—	Belgium, Netherlands, Luxembourg, Germany (western lander)
Central-East	—	Austria, Bulgaria, Croatia, Czech Republic, Germany (eastern & southern lander), Hungary, Italy, Poland, Romania, Russia, Slovakia, Slovenia, Switzerland, Ukraine
Iberia	Andalucía	Gibraltar, Andalusia, Portugal
Iberia	Galicia	Galicia
Iberia	Central	rest of Spain
Nordic	—	Denmark, Estonia, Finland, Iceland, Latvia, Lithuania, Norway, Sweden
North-West	Bretagne	Brittany
North-West	Federal	Channel Islands, rest of France

== Competitions ==
=== Competitions formats ===
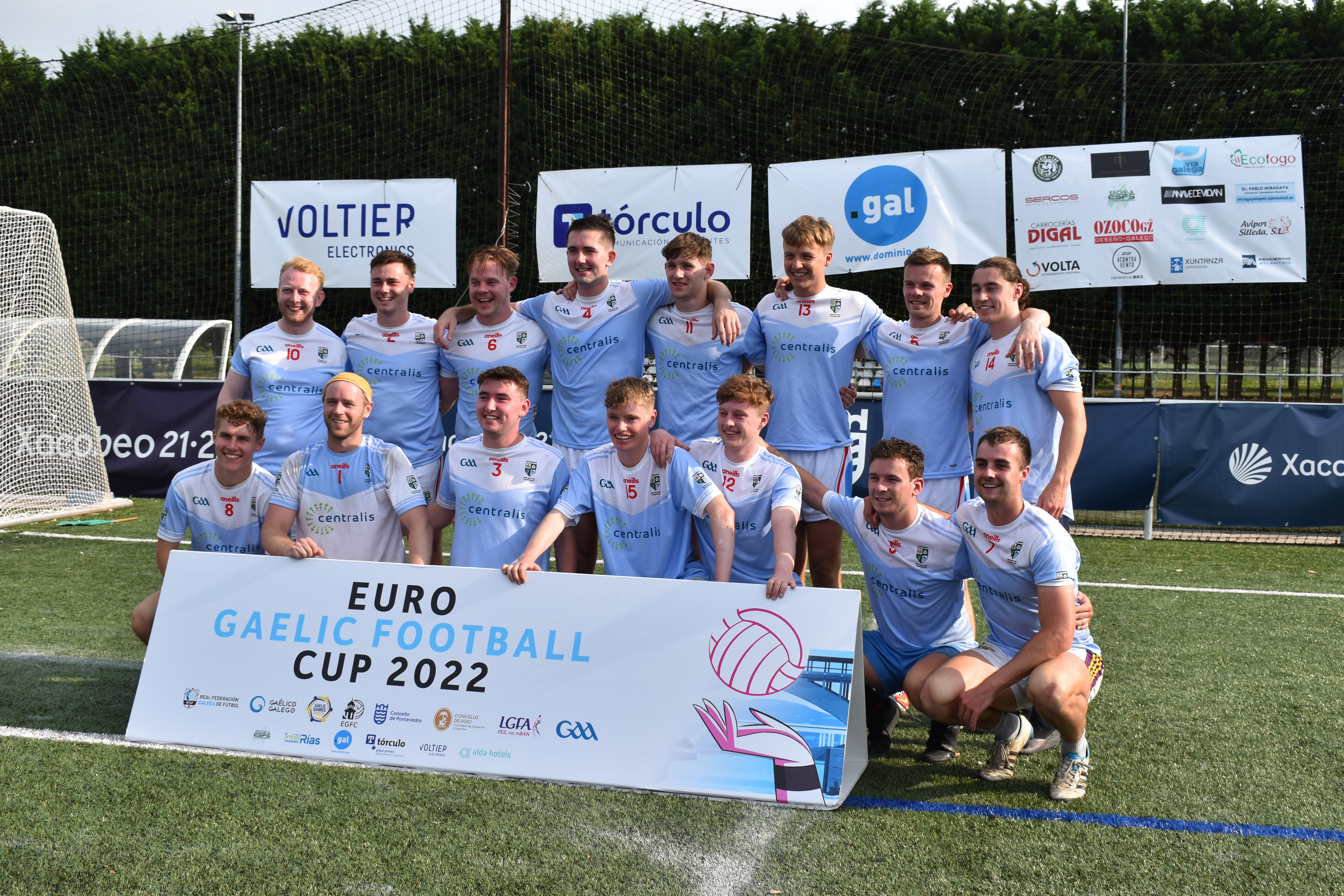
Luxembourg in Euro Gaelic Football Cup 2022

In GAA terms, 'Europe' comprises all of continental Europe (excluding Ireland & Great Britain) with great distances between each team – so Gaelic Games Europe has various competition formats.

Since 2006, men's and ladies football competitions have been played on a regional basis. Teams play in regional competitions and may also enter European Football Championships. Some regions also have their own competitions (e.g. Brittany, Galicia).

A number of the regional competitions use a system of 'rounds' (also called 'tournaments') spread over a number of months. Each round is completed in a single day with teams playing a single round-robin group or multiple groups followed by knock-out style play-offs (e.g. quarter & semi-finals) and a final to determine the ranking of every team present on the day. Teams are awarded points (25 points for the winner, 20 points for the runner-up, etc.) which are added to those accrued in other rounds to determine the competition winners for that season.

All men's (11-a-side) and ladies (9-a-side) teams may enter the European Football Championships which is a one-day event, usually in October. Teams are seeded into different grades (Senior, Intermediate and Junior). Each team plays 3-4 group games before progressing to the play-off stages of a Championship, Shield & Plate competition depending on their results.

The 'Premier' championships are for 15-a-side teams in men's and ladies' football and are organised on a 'knock-out' basis - as is usual in GAA championships with 60 minute games - played over a number of weekends or a tournament format at a suitable 15-a-side GAA pitch. Winners then represent Europe in the All Ireland Club Championships.

The European camogie and hurling championships are played by teams (9-a-side) from across Europe who compete together over five 'rounds' in various cities between May and October annually.

Other matches such as internationals (which have featured France, Italy, Germany, Galicia and Brittany) are also played, along with national 'cup' competitions confined to teams in a single country (e.g. Finland, Germany).

=== Gaelic football (men) ===
==== European Football Championships (11s) aka "Pan Euros" ====
Senior Football Championship (11s)
- Founded: 2001
- Title holders: GSC Luxembourg (4th title)
- First winner: Paris Gaels
- Most titles: Den Haag, GSC Luxembourg (4 titles)
- Sponsors: KINGSPAN

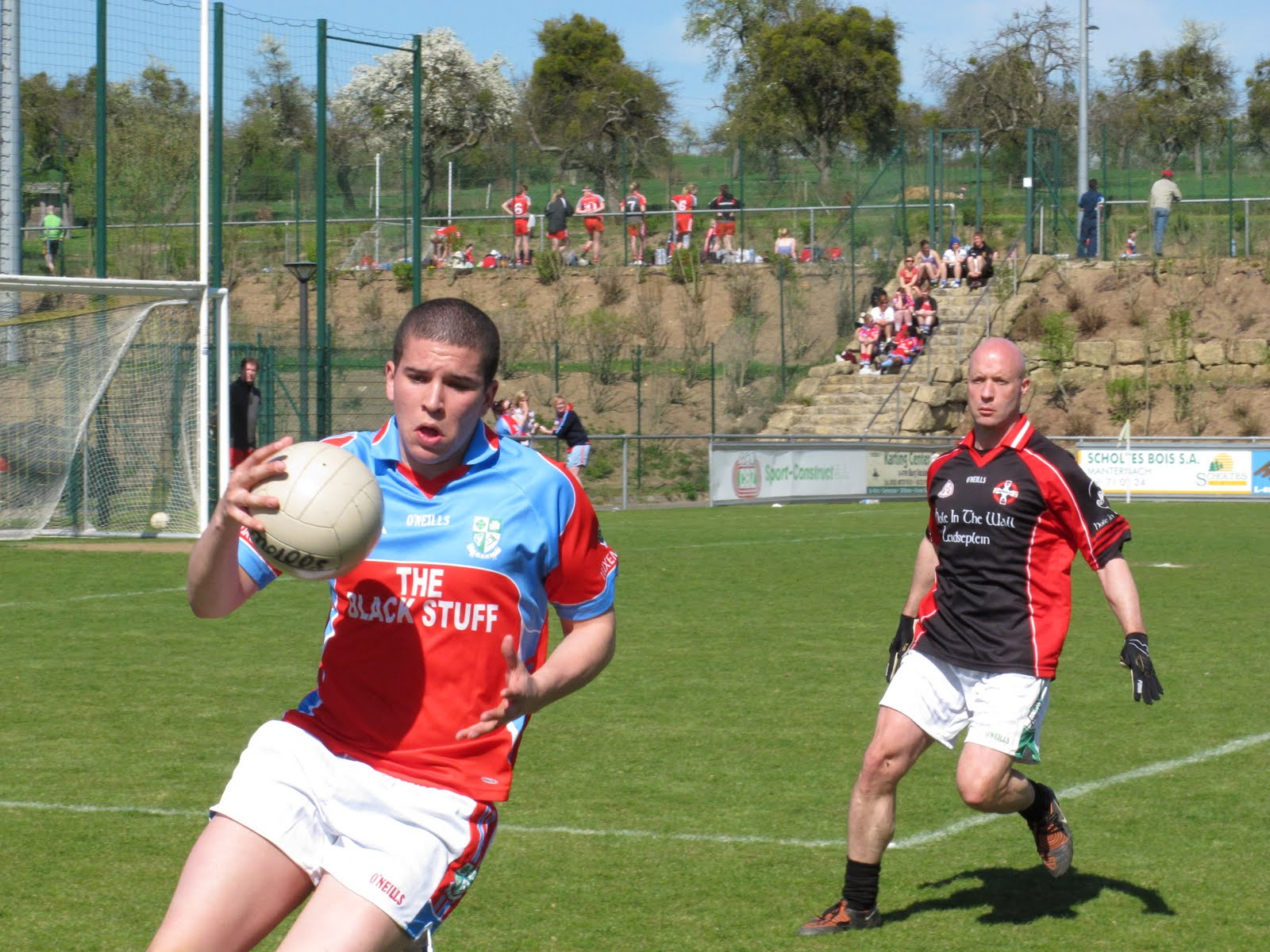
GSC Luxembourg team v Amsterdam GAC, Berbourg, April 2011

European Intermediate Football Championship (formerly 'European Shield')
- Founded: 2006
- Title holders: Hillerod (1st title)
- First winner: Maastricht Gaels
- Most titles: Copenhagen (3 titles)

Year	Winner	Runner-up
2001	Paris Gaels	
2002	Den Haag	
2003	Paris Gaels	
2004	München Colmcilles	
2005	Paris Gaels	
2006	Den Haag	
2007	GSC Luxembourg	
2008	Belgium GAA	Paris Gaels
2009	Den Haag	Paris Gaels
2010	Den Haag	Paris Gaels
2011	Guernsey Gaels	Den Haag
2012	Belgium GAA	
2013	Guernsey Gaels	Belgium GAA "A"
2014	Belgium GAA	
2015	Paris Gaels	
2016	GSC Luxembourg	Jersey Irish
2017	Cumann Warsaw	GSC Luxembourg
2018	Amsterdam GAC	Cumann Warsaw
2019	Madrid Harps	Cumann Warsaw
2020	not played due to pandemic	
2021	not played due to pandemic	
2022	Madrid Harps	Cumann Warsaw
2023	Cumann Warsaw	Nantes Don Bosco
2024	Cumann Warsaw	Hillerød Wolfe Tones
2025	GSC Luxembourg	Nantes Don Bosco
2026	Madrid Harps	Copenhagen

==== European Premier Football Championship (15-a-side) ====
The European Premier Football Championships offer the opportunity for clubs with sufficient capacity and ambition to play the games in the same format in which they are organised in Ireland, i.e. 15-a-side, full rules and on full size GAA pitches. The winners of the Men's and Ladies' competitions advance to represent Europe in the first round of the GAA's Leinster Junior Club Football Championship and the preliminary round of the LGFA's All-Ireland Junior Club Championship respectively. In November 2024, Barcelona Gaels became the first GGE affiliated club to win a championship match in Ireland when they beat Conahy Shamrocks of Kilkenny by 3-11 to 1-05 in the first round of the Leinster Junior Club Football Championship, before losing by a point to Kilcavan of Laois in the quarter-final the following week.

European Premier Football Championship
- Irish: Príomh-Chraobh Peile na hEorpa
- Code: Gaelic football (men)
- Founded: 2013
- Trophy: Croke Park Hotel Cup
- Title holders: Barcelona Gaels (3rd title)
- First winner: Guernsey Gaels
- Most titles: Amsterdam (7 titles)
- Sponsors: Kingspan

Premier (Men) Football Championship
Year	Winner	Runner-up	Venue
2013	Guernsey Gaels	Zürich Inneoin	Maastricht
2014	Amsterdam GAC		Maastricht
2015	Amsterdam GAC		Maastricht
2016	Amsterdam GAC		Maastricht
2017	GSC Luxembourg	Amsterdam GAC	Maastricht
2018	Amsterdam GAC	Eindhoven Shamrocks	Maastricht
2019	Berlin GAA	Belgium GAA	Maastricht
2020	not played due to pandemic		
2021	Amsterdam GAC	Madrid Harps	Maastricht
2022	Amsterdam GAC	Barcelona Gaels	Rennes
2023	Amsterdam GAC	Barcelona Gaels	Rennes
2024	Barcelona Gaels	Berlin GAA	Maastricht
2025	Barcelona Gaels	Amsterdam GAC	Rennes
2026	Barcelona Gaels	Amsterdam GAC	Rennes

==== Euro Gaelic Football Cup ====
Year	Host city	Winner	Runner-up	Third place	Fourth place	Ref
2017	Düsseldorf	Brittany	Germany	Netherlands		
2018	Lorient	France	Galicia	Brittany	Gascony	
2022	Pontevedra	Luxembourg	France			

=== Ladies' Football ===
European Ladies Gaelic Football Championship (9s/11s)
- Founded: 2001
- Title holders: Cumann Warszawa
- First winner: Belgium GAA
- Most titles: Belgium GAA (14 titles)

==== European Ladies Football Championship ====
Year	Winner	Runner-up
2001	Belgium GAA	
2002	GSC Luxembourg	
2003	GSC Luxembourg	
2004	GSC Luxembourg	
2005	Holland Ladies	
2006	GSC Luxembourg	
2007	Paris Gaels	
2008	Belgium GAA	
2009	Belgium GAA	Paris Gaels
2010	Belgium GAA	
2011	Belgium GAA	Munich
2012	Belgium GAA	
2013	Belgium GAA	Holland Ladies
2014	Belgium GAA	
2015	Belgium GAA	
2016	Belgium GAA	Holland Ladies
2017	Belgium GAA	A Coruna
2018	Cumann Warsaw	Belgium GAA
2019	Belgium GAA	Cumann Warsaw
2020	not played due to pandemic	
2021	not played due to pandemic	
2022	Belgium GAA	Cumann Warsaw
2023	Belgium GAA	Cumann Warsaw
2024	Cumann Warsaw	Belgium GAA
2025	Belgium GAA	Cumann Warsaw
2026	Bordeaux A	Rennes GAA

==== European Premier Ladies Football Championship (15-a-side) ====
European Premier (15s) Ladies Football Championship
- Founded: 2014
- Title holders: Rennes Ar Gwazi Gouez (1st title)
- First winner: Belgium
- Most titles: Belgium (4 titles)

Year	Winner	Runner-up	Venue
2014	Belgium GAA	Holland Ladies	
2015	Belgium GAA	Holland Ladies	
2016	Belgium GAA / Munich Collmcilles (combined team)	Holland Ladies / Luxembourg (combined team)	
2017	Belgium GAA / Munich Collmcilles (combined team)	Holland Ladies	
2018	Belgium GAA/Holland Ladies (combined team)		
2019	Belgium GAA/Holland Ladies (combined team)		
2020	not played due to pandemic		
2021	not played due to pandemic		
2022	Belgium GAA	Ar Gwazi Gouez (Rennes)	Rennes
2023	Belgium GAA	Ar Gwazi Gouez (Rennes)	Rennes
2024	Paris/Bordeaux	Belgium GAA/Groningen	Maastricht
2025	Rennes Ar Gwazi Gouez	Paris/Bordeaux	Rennes
2026	Craobh Rua, Brussels	Barcelona Gaels	Rennes

=== Hurling ===
European Hurling Championship (9s)
- Founded: 2002
- Title holders: Brussels Craobh Rua (10th title)
- First winner: C.L.G. Den Haag
- Most titles: Brussels Craobh Rua (10 titles)

==== European Hurling (9s) Championship ====
Year	Winner	Runner-up	Shield	Plate
2002	C.L.G. Den Haag	Zürich Inneoin		
2003	C.L.G. Den Haag	Zürich Inneoin		
2004	Zürich Inneoin	Munich Colmcilles		
2005	Zürich Inneoin	Munich Colmcilles		
2006	Zürich Inneoin	Belgium GAA		
2007	C.L.G. Den Haag	GSC Luxembourg		
2008	GSC Luxembourg	Belgium GAA		
2009	Belgium GAA	GSC Luxembourg		
2010	Belgium GAA	GSC Luxembourg		
2011	Zürich Inneoin	C.L.G. Den Haag		
2012	C.L.G. Den Haag			
2013	Belgium GAA	C.L.G. Den Haag		
2014	Belgium GAA	C.L.G. Den Haag		
2015	Belgium GAA	Viking Gaels		
2016	Belgium GAA	GSC Luxembourg		
2017	GSC Luxembourg	Belgium GAA		
2018	Belgium GAA		Dresden GAA Club	Darmstadt GAA
2019	Belgium GAA	GSC Luxembourg	Hamburg GAA	Darmstadt GAA
2020	not played due to pandemic			
2021	not played due to pandemic			
2022	GSC Luxembourg	Belgium GAA	Hamburg GAA	Belgium GAA
2023	GSC Luxembourg	Belgium GAA	Hamburg GAA	Darmstadt GAA
2024	GSC Luxembourg	Viking Gaels	C.L.G. Den Haag	Hamburg GAA
2025	Brussels Craobh Rua	Viking Gaels	Hamburg GAA	Darmstadt GAA
2026	GSC Luxembourg	Viking Gaels	Hamburg GAA	Darmstadt GAA

=== European Premier Hurling Championship (15s) ===
European Premier Hurling Championship
- Founded: 2022
- Title holders: Amsterdam GAC (5th title)
- First winner: Amsterdam GAC
- Most titles: Amsterdam GAC (5 titles)
- Sponsors: Kingspan

Year	Winner	Runner-up
2022	Amsterdam GAC	GSC Luxembourg
2023	Amsterdam GAC	GSC Luxembourg
2024	Amsterdam GAC	GSC Luxembourg
2025	Amsterdam GAC	Viking Gaels
2026	Amsterdam GAC	GSC Luxembourg

=== Camogie ===
European Camogie Championship
- Founded: 2008
- Title holders: Brussels Craobh Rua (12th title)
- First winner: Luxembourg
- Most titles: Brussels Craobh Rua (former Belgium GAA) (12 titles)

==== European Camogie Championship ====
Year	Winner	Runner-up
2008	GSC Luxembourg	
2009	GSC Luxembourg	
2010	Belgium GAA	GSC Luxembourg
2011	Belgium GAA	Zurich Inneoin
2012	Paris Gaels	Belgium GAA
2013	Belgium GAA	Paris Gaels
2014	Belgium GAA	
2015	Belgium GAA	
2016	Belgium GAA	GSC Luxembourg
2017	Belgium GAA	GSC Luxembourg
2018	Belgium GAA	
2019	Belgium GAA	Hamburg GAA
2020	not played due to pandemic	
2021	not played due to pandemic	
2022	Belgium GAA ('A')	Belgium GAA ('B')
2023	Belgium GAA	Hamburg GAA
2024	Viking Gaels	
2025	GSC Luxembourg	
2026	Brussels Craobh Rua	Viking Gaels

== Affiliated clubs ==
These are the 114 affiliated clubs (as of January 2025) located across 24 countries and organised into five "regions" (Benelux, Central-East, Iberia, Nordics and North-West) for competition purposes. Various "sub-regions" such as Brittany (France), Galicia and Andalucia (Spain) have their own competitions as well as playing in regional championships.

GAA Clubs in Europe
Club	Colours	Location	Country
Benelux
Belgium GAA		Brussels	Belgium
EC Brussels Youth		Brussels	Belgium
Earls of Leuven		Leuven	Belgium
Aachen GAA		Aachen	Germany
Cologne Celtics		Cologne	Germany
Darmstadt GAA		Darmstadt	Germany
Düsseldorf GFC		Düsseldorf	Germany
Eintracht Frankfurt GAA		Frankfurt	Germany
Hamburg GAA		Hamburg	Germany
Gaelic Sports Club Luxembourg		Luxembourg	Luxembourg
Amsterdam GAC		Amsterdam	Netherlands
Eindhoven Shamrocks GFC		Eindhoven	Netherlands
Groningen Gaels		Groningen	Netherlands
C.L.G. Den Haag		The Hague	Netherlands
Maastricht Gaels		Maastricht	Netherlands
Nijmegen GAA		Nijmegen	Netherlands
Central-East
Salzburg GAA		Salzburg	Austria
Vienna Gaels		Vienna	Austria
Croatian Celts		Zagreb	Croatia
Prague Hibernians GFC		Prague	Czech Republic
Píobairí Strakonice GAC		Strakonice	Czech Republic
Rómhánaigh Augsburg Óg		Augsburg	Germany
Berlin GAA		Berlin	Germany
Setanta Berlin GAA		Berlin	Germany
Dresden GAA Club		Dresden	Germany
München Colmcilles		München	Germany
Stuttgart GAA		Stuttgart	Germany
Budapest Gaels		Budapest	Hungary
Sant'Ambrogio Milano GAA		Milan	Italy
S.S. Lazio Calcio Gaelico		Rome	Italy
Bydgoszcz CLG		Bydgoszcz	Poland
Cumann Warsaw		Warsaw	Poland
Éire Óg Wroclaw		Wrocław	Poland
Seamus Heaneys GAC		Moscow	Russia
Moscow Shamrocks		Moscow	Russia
Simbirisk Celts		Ulyanovsk	Russia
Slovak Shamrocks		Bratislava	Slovakia
Basel		Basel	Switzerland
Geneva Gaels		Geneva	Switzerland
Midland GAC		Solothurn	Switzerland
Zürich Inneoin		Zürich	Switzerland
Iberia
Gibraltar Gaels		Gibraltar	Gibraltar
LX Celtiberos GAA Club		Lisbon	Portugal
Porto Gaels		Porto	Portugal
A Coruña Fillos de Breogán		A Coruña	Spain ( Galicia)
Irmamdinhos da Estrada		A Estrada	Spain ( Galicia)
Barcelona Gaels		Barcelona	Spain ( Catalonia)
Gaelicos do Gran Sol		Barcelona	Spain ( Catalonia)
Bilbao GAA		Bilbao	Spain
Turonia Gondomar Fútbol Gaélico		Gondomar	Spain ( Galicia)
Dorna GAA		Illa de Arousa	Spain ( Galicia)
Herdeiros de Dhais		Lalin	Spain ( Galicia)
Madrid Harps		Madrid	Spain ( Madrid)
Madrid Youths (only youths)		Madrid	Spain ( Madrid)
Malaga		Malaga	Spain ( Andalusia)
Costa Gaels		Marbella	Spain ( Andalusia)
Ártabros de Oleiros		Oleiros	Spain ( Galicia)
Auriense Gaelic Football		Ourense	Spain ( Galicia)
Lune de Beltane		Poia, Pontevedra	Spain ( Galicia)
Estrela Vermelha		Santiago de Compostela	Spain ( Galicia)
Éire Óg Sevilla		Sevilla	Spain ( Andalusia)
Sitges Eagles		Sitges	Spain ( Catalonia)
Sant Vicent GAA		Valencia	Spain ( Valencia)
St. Patrcks		Vitoria-Gasteiz	Spain
Keltoi Vigo		Vigo	Spain ( Galicia)
Independiente FC		Vigo	Spain ( Galicia)
Zaragoza GAA		Zaragoza	Spain
Nordic
Aarhus GAA		Aarhus	Denmark
Copenhagen GAA		Copenhagen	Denmark
Viking Gaels (camogie/hurling)		Copenhagen	Denmark
Hillerod Wolfe Tones		Hillerød	Denmark
Helsinki Harps GAA		Helsinki	Finland
Tampere Hammers		Tampere	Finland
Gavle GAA		Gavle	Sweden
Gothenburg GAA		Gothenburg	Sweden
Malmö GAA		Malmö	Sweden
Sandviken Gaels		Sandviken	Sweden
Stockholm Gaels		Stockholm	Sweden
North-West
Ecureuils d’Agen GFC		Agen	France
Anjou Gaels		Angers	France
Azur Gaels		Antibes	France
Gaelic Football Club d'Arthon		Arthon	France
Burdigaela Gaelic Football		Bordeaux	France
Gaelic Football Bro Leon		Brest	France / Bretagne
Clermont GFC		Clermont-Ferrand	France
Grenoble Alpes Gaels		Grenoble	France
Gwenrann Football Gaélique		Guérande	France / Bretagne
Pas-en-Artois (Killiennes)		Pas-en-Artois	France
EGHB Liffré		Liffré	France / Bretagne
Lille Football Gaélique		Lille	France
Le Mans Gaels		Le Mans	France
Football Gaélique Le Havre		Le Havre	France
Lorient GAC		Lorient	France / Bretagne
Lugdunum CLG		Lyon	France
Football Gaélique Mondeville		Mondeville	France
Montpellier GAA		Montpellier	France
Nantes Football Gaélique		Nantes	France / Bretagne
Niort Gaels		Niort	France
Paris Gaels		Paris	France
Pau Bearn Sports Gaeliques		Pau Béarn	France
Provence GF		La Fare-les-Oliviers	France
Kerne Football Gaélique		Quimper	France / Bretagne
Rennes Ar Gwazi Gouez		Rennes	France / Bretagne
Football Gaélique Rostrenen		Rostrenen	France / Bretagne
GF Bro Sant-Brieg		Saint-Brieuc	France / Bretagne
Goélands Gaëlics St. Coulomb		St. Coulomb	France / Bretagne
Strasbourg		Strasbourg	France
Tolosa Gaels		Toulouse	France
Gwened Vannes		Vannes	France / Bretagne
Guernsey Gaels		Saint Peter Port	Guernsey
Jersey Irish		Saint Helier	Jersey
