= Rome Hibernia GAA =

- Founded: 2012
- County: Europe
- Colours: Red and White
- Grounds: Stadio Tre Fontane; Rome, Italy

Playing kits
Standard colours

Rome Hibernia GAA formerly known as S.S. Lazio Calcio Gaelico and Lazio GAA, is a Gaelic Athletic Association (GAA) club based in Rome, Italy.

The club caters for men and ladies' Gaelic football hurling and camogie. The teams play in the Central-East region of Europe GAA. It is one of the two Italian teams, along with Sant'Ambrogio Milano GAC, who are recognized by GAA.

Originally the club was founded and known as Rome Gaelic Football by an owner of one of the most famous Irish pubs in Rome. Their kits were green and black.

In 2024, the club underwent a major rebranding, changing its name to Rome Hibernia GAA, updating its kit to new red and white colours, and introducing a new crest that symbolizes its dual heritage. The crest combines Roman and Irish symbolism, featuring the goddess of Rome—a protector and counsellor of the state—referencing the strength of the Roman army and the wisdom of the Roman Senate. The crest incorporates the luck of the Irish and is a contemporary nod to County Londonderry, blending traditional GAA characteristics with symbols of both hurling and football with the goddess’s brooch containing a harp as a reference to Ireland and the Tara Brooch, while the colour white, representing Jupiter, symbolises strength of mind.

The club also hosts an annual Cormac Mac Lochlainn Cup in honour of their former captain, Cormac Mac Lochlainn, who played an important role in building the team and tragically died of cancer in 2022.

The club has known worldwide fame, most in the Irish media, for a meeting with Pope Francis, to whom they gave an O'Neills ball. The curious picture became viral in Ireland.

In recent years, the club has participated in various exhibitions and community events, including collaborations with the Irish Embassy to the Holy See and Gaelic Games Europe to showcase Gaelic games during the "Jubilee of Sport" in Rome. In 2025, these efforts included gifting a special Rome Hibernia GAA jersey to Pope Leo XIV.

They are twinned with Azur Gaels team from Nice, France.

== Honours ==
Lazio GAA men's team won the Pan-European Junior B title in Maastricht in 2017, as well with minor trophies in Italy and France.

The ladies' team won an Italian Cup in 2016 and won the first round of Central-East European Tournament held in their city in 2018.

In 2023, 21 players from the club travelled to Derry to participate in the GAA World Games. The men’s team performed strongly, reaching the semi-finals. Meanwhile, female players from the club joined forces with athletes from other regions to compete as part of the “Central East Europe” team. The team narrowly missed winning the Ladies Open Shield, finishing as runners-up. In 2024, Rome Hibernia GAA hosted the second round of the Central East European Championship, with both the men’s and women’s teams finishing in first place.
