= Frankfurt Sarsfields GAA =

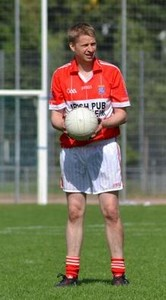
A Frankfurt Sarsfields player

Frankfurt Sarsfields is a Frankfurt-based Gaelic football team. The team competes in European wide tournaments and have been Shield runners-up in their first two seasons.

The aim of the club is to give Gaelic football players in Germany a chance to show their talents while also giving people in Hessen, Rhineland-Palatinate and the surrounding regions a chance to play.

The club is an amateur organisation that welcomes all those who wish to play or get involved with the team.
