= Amsterdam GAC =

Gaelic games club in Amsterdam

- Amstardam
- Founded: 2003
- Colours: Red and Black
- Grounds: Stichting Sportpark de Eendracht
- Coordinates: 52°22′48″N 4°47′13″E

Playing kits
Standard colours

Amsterdam Gaelic Athletic Club is a Gaelic football, hurling and camogie club based in Amsterdam, Netherlands.

== History ==
The club was founded in 2003. They were the first team to represent Europe in the All-Ireland Junior Club Hurling Championship in 2022. In November 2025 they became the first club representing Europe to win the Leinster Club Special Junior Hurling Championship.

It is based at the Stichting Sportpark de Eendracht in De Eendracht, Amsterdam, a multisport facility to the west of the city centre. It hosts Cúl Camps for youths.

== Honours ==
=== Football ===
- Europe Senior Football Championship (7): 2014, 2015, 2016, 2018, 2021, 2022, 2023,

=== Hurling ===
- Europe Premier Hurling Championship (5): 2022, 2023, 2024, 2025, 2026
- Leinster Club Special Junior Hurling Championship (1): 2025
