= Clermont Gaelic Football Club =

Gaelic football club in France

Clermont Gaels Gaelic Football Club
- Nickname: Les Bougnats
- Colours: Yellow and blue
- Grounds: Stade Leclanché, Clermont Ferrand

Playing kits
Standard colours

The Clermont Gaelic Football Club is a Gaelic football club situated in Clermont-Ferrand, France.

== History ==
With the help of the organisation "La Ballade Irlandaise", the club held its first training session in May 2008. Fifteen players were present. The club's first ever match took place in November 2008 against Nantes. The team organised a tournament in Clermont-Ferrand in March 2009 with teams from Paris, Rennes, Nantes and Lyon participating.

While the club was "dormant" during the 2010-2011 season, by the 2011–2012 season the club's membership had grown to around 30 players. The team finished runners-up at the Toulouse tournament, and finished third at the Clermont tournament.

In March 2012, the club purchased its first set of jerseys, and would now be playing in yellow and blue, the traditional colours of the Auvergne region. The 2012 season also saw the club win their first trophy, when they finished the season by winning the French & Anglo-Norman Islands Championship Shield.

The team started the 2012–2013 season by finishing runners-up in a charity tournament in Niort. During the first round of the Federal 2012-2013 Championship in Toulouse in February 2013, Clermont beat Lyon for the first time in official competition by a scoreline of 18 points to 3. The team ultimately finished the tournament in third place.

Victories over Lorient, Coutances and Niort meant that Clermont contested their second consecutive Shield/Intermediate final in June 2013. Clermont defeated the home side Saint Brieux in the final to win their second French Shield/Intermediate Championship in a row.

In the 2013-2014 season, Clermont won their first ever Federal Championship tournament in Lyon. They finished joint-winners with Toulouse as the final had to be cancelled due to a storm. This was followed up with a fourth-place finish in the second round in Toulouse. In June 2014, and for the third year in a row, Clermont were crowned Shield (later named Honneur)/Intermediate Champions of France.

In 2014, the club took part in the 2014 European Championship finals in Maastricht. Clermont were drawn in Group B of the Intermediate/Junior qualifying groups alongside Amsterdam B, Rennes, Düsseldorf and Rovigo. The team earned a third-place finish in the event.

== Honours ==
- French Gaelic Football Championship (Shield/Intermediate) (4): 2012, 2013, 2014, 2015
