= Cúl Camps =

Irish summer camp

Cúl Camps (officially Kelloggs Cúl Camps) is a summer camp for children aged between 6 and 13 that teaches the skills of Gaelic games. The games are held all across Ireland and are run by the Gaelic Athletic Association and the various county boards. The camps teach Gaelic football and hurling and are normally taught by local volunteers from clubs around the county or county footballers. The camps work on different aspects of Gaelic games such as kick passing, shooting and hand passing etc.

== GAA Cúl Camps television series ==
Cúl Camps
- Also known as: GAA Cúl Camps
- Genre: Children's television series; Educational; Sport
- Presented by: Gráinne Bleasdale; Rena Buckley; Liam Rushe; Kevin Cassidy
- Country of origin: Ireland
- Original language: Irish
- No. of seasons: 1

Production
- Running time: 30 minutes
- Production companies: Nemeton productions; (supported by) Cúl Camps

Original release
- Network: TG4; TG4 Player
- Release: 29 June 2020

GAA Cúl Camps, is an Irish language sports educational television programme which was created in response to the cancellation, postponement or curtailment of many of the Cúl Camps during the COVID-19 pandemic in the Republic of Ireland in the summer of 2020. Announced on 17 June, it began broadcasting on TG4 on 29 June. Actress Gráinne Bleasdale presents skills lessons from GAA stars Rena Buckley, Liam Rushe and Kevin Cassidy.
