= Cumann Warsaw =

Gaelic Athletic Association club in Poland

- Cumann Warszawa
- Founded: 2009
- Colours: White and Red
- Grounds: Warszawa, Poland
- Coordinates: 52.211°N 20.994°E

Playing kits
Standard colours

Cumann Warsaw (Cumann Warszawa) is a GAA club in Warsaw, Poland. The club has joint hurling and Gaelic football sessions once a week at Pole Mokotowskie, with winter training taking place indoors at the nearby Stadion Skra.

== History ==
The club was founded in October 2009. The first AGM of the club took place in March 2010 where the first committee was elected.

The first competitive match for the club was in Vienna on 24 April 2010. This was the first ever championship appearance by a Gaelic football team from Poland where they succeeded in winning the 3rd/4th place playoff with a score line of Cumann Warszawa 5:5 Vienna Gaels 1:2. In October 2010, the team won in Budapest the All-Europe Shield Final.
