= 1969 All-Ireland Senior Football Championship final =

- Event: 1969 All-Ireland Senior Football Championship
| Kerry | Offaly |
| 0–10 | 0–7 |
- Date: 28 September 1969
- Venue: Croke Park, Dublin
- Referee: John Moloney
- Attendance: 67,828

The 1969 All-Ireland Senior Football Championship final was the 82nd All-Ireland Final and the deciding match of the 1969 All-Ireland Senior Football Championship, an inter-county Gaelic football tournament for the top teams in Ireland.

== Match ==
=== Summary ===
Kerry claimed a three-point win, thanks mostly to three great saves by goalkeeper Johnny Culloty.

This was also the first Championship meeting of Kerry and Offaly.

Half-time entertainment was provided by way of an Irish dancing routine from the "Hurling Boys from Omagh", County Tyrone.

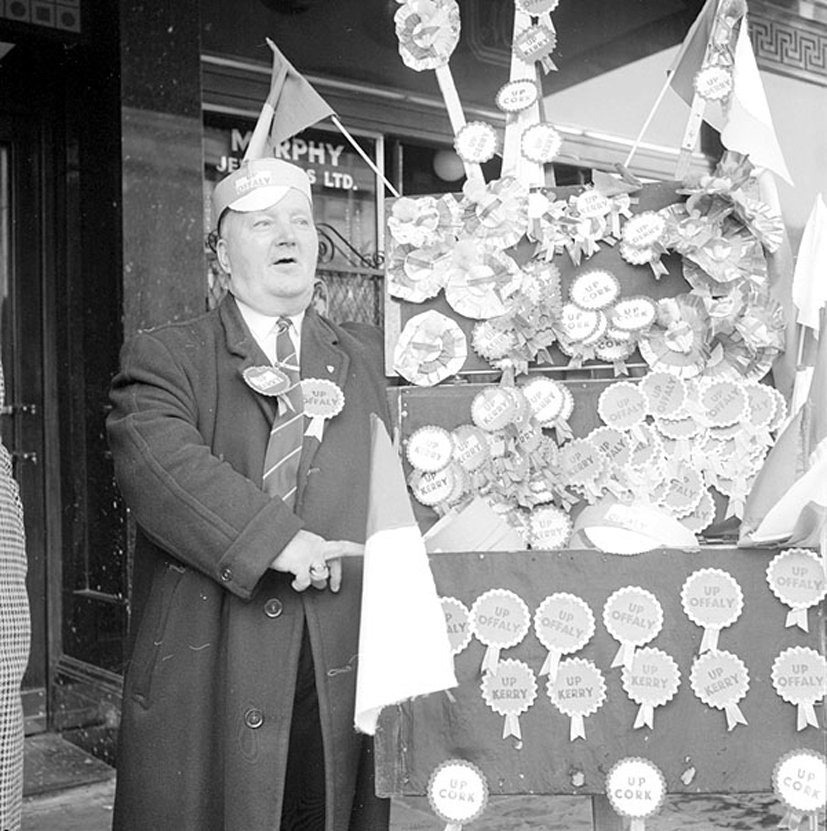
Vendor at Heuston Station in 1969, selling rosettes for Kerry, Offaly, Derry and Cork (the latter meeting in the minor final)

=== Details ===
28 September 1969

| Kerry | 0–10 – 0–7 | Offaly |
|---|---|---|
| M. O'Connell (0–02); M. O'Dwyer (0–02); D. J. Crowley (0–02); M. Gleeson (0–02); L. Higgins (0–01); B. Lynch (0–01) | | T. McTague (0–03); S. Evans (0–02); W. Bryan (0–01); P. Keenan (0–01) |

Croke Park, Dublin
Referee: John Moloney (Tipperary)

Kerry
Offaly

| 1 | Johnny Culloty (c) |
| 2 | Séamus Murphy |
| 3 | Paudie O'Donoghue |
| 4 | Séamus MacGearailt |
| 5 | Tom Prendergast |
| 6 | Mick Morris |
| 7 | Mícheál Ó Sé |
| 8 | Mick O'Connell |
| 9 | Din Joe Crowley |
| 10 | Brendan Lynch |
| 11 | Pat Griffin |
| 12 | Éamonn O'Donoghue |
| 13 | Michael Gleeson |
| 14 | Liam Higgins |
| 15 | Mick O'Dwyer |
Substitutes:
| 16 | Donie O'Sullivan |
| 17 | Mick Fleming |
| 18 | John O'Keeffe |
| 19 | Derry Crowley |
| 20 | Dom O'Donnell |
| 21 | Weeshie Fogarty |
Manager:
Jackie Lyne

| 1 | Martin Furlong |
| 2 | Paddy McCormack |
| 3 | Greg Hughes |
| 4 | Johnny Egan (c) |
| 5 | Eugene Mulligan |
| 6 | Nick Clavin |
| 7 | Mick Ryan |
| 8 | Larry Coughlan |
| 9 | Willie Bryan |
| 10 | Pat Keenan | (substituted off) #18' |
| 11 | Ambrose Hickey | (substituted off) #17' |
| 12 | Tony McTague |
| 13 | Sean Kilroy | (substituted off) #16' |
| 14 | Seán Evans |
| 15 | Seán Cooney |
Substitutes:
| 16 | Pat Monaghan | (substituted in) #13' |
| 17 | Frank Costello | (substituted in) #11' |
| 18 | Kevin Kilmurray | (substituted in) #10' |
| 19 | Mick O'Rourke |
| 20 | Joe Flynn |
| 21 | Brian Guinan |
| 22 | Leo Grogan |
| 23 | Har McEvoy |
Manager:
Fr. Tom Scully

Linesmen:

Sideline Official
