= 1972 All-Ireland Senior Football Championship final =

- Event: 1972 All-Ireland Senior Football Championship
Offaly	Kerry
1–13 (16)	1–13 (16)
- Date: 24 September 1972
- Venue: Croke Park, Dublin
- Referee: Fintan Tierney (Cavan)
- Attendance: 72,032

1972 All-Ireland Senior Football Championship final replay
Offaly	Kerry
1–19 (22)	0–13 (13)
- Date: 15 October 1972
- Venue: Croke Park, Dublin
- Referee: Paddy Devlin (Tyrone)
- Attendance: 66,136

The 1972 All-Ireland Senior Football Championship final was the 85th All-Ireland Final and the deciding match of the 1972 All-Ireland Senior Football Championship, an inter-county Gaelic football tournament for the top teams in Ireland.

== Match 1 ==
=== Summary ===
Mick O'Dwyer brought the sides level to force a replay.

=== Details ===
24 September 1972
Final

Offaly	1–13 – 1–13	Kerry
T McTague 0–6, J Cooney 1–2, P Fenning 0–2, J Smith 0–2, K Kilmurray 0–1		B Lynch 1–7, M O'Dwyer 0–5, M O'Connell 0–1

Croke Park, Dublin
Attendance: 72,032
Referee: Fintan Tierney (Cavan)

== Match 2 ==
=== Summary ===
Paddy Devlin from Tyrone, who later took charge of the 1974 final, oversaw the replay.

Offaly won the replay.

Tony McTague scored sixteen points in the two games.

Paddy Fenning scored Offaly's goal.

This was Kerry's biggest ever defeat in an All-Ireland final.

It was also the last time Micks O'Connell and O'Dwyer played at Croke Park.

=== Details ===
15 October 1972
Final replay

Offaly	1–19 – 0–13	Kerry
T McTague 0–10, P Fenning 1–1, M Connor 0–2, S Darby, 0–2, W Bryan 0–3, K Kilmurray 0–1		M O'Connell 0–7, B Lynch 0–2, L Higgins 0–2, M O'Dwyer 0–2

Croke Park, Dublin
Attendance: 66,136
Referee: Paddy Devlin (Tyrone)

Offaly
Kerry

==== Offaly (is this the replay or the drawn game?) ====
- 1 M. Furlong
- 2 M. Ryan
- 3 P. McCormack
- 4 L. Coughlan
- 5 E. Mulligan
- 6 S. Lowry
- 7 M. Heavey
- 8 W. Bryan
- 9 S. Evans
- 10 S. Cooney
- 11 K. Kilmurray
- 12 T. McTague (c)
- 13 S. Darby
- 14 J. Smith
- 15 P. Fenning

Subs used
17 M. Connor for S. Cooney
22 N. Clavin for E. Mulligan
18 M. Wright for L. Coughlan

Subs not used
16 N. Kinnarney
19 L. Hanlon
20 J. Gunning
21 S. Kilroy

==== Kerry ====
- 1 É. Fitzgerald
- 2 D. O'Sullivan
- 3 P. O'Donoghue
- 4 S. Mac Gearailt
- 5 T. Prendergast (c)
- 6 M. Ó Sé
- 7 P. Lynch
- 8 M. O'Connell
- 9 J. O'Keeffe
- 10 B. Lynch
- 11 D. Kavanagh
- 12 É. O'Donoghue
- 13 M. Gleeson
- 14 L. Higgins
- 15 M. O'Dwyer

Subs used in drawn game and replay
17 D. Crowley for S. Mac Gearailt
16 P. Griffin for M. Gleeson
18 J. Walsh for B. Lynch

Subs not used
19 J. Saunders
20 M. O'Sullivan
21 G. Power
22 J. Coffey

Trainer
J. Culloty
