= 1968 All-Ireland Senior Football Championship final =

- Event: 1968 All-Ireland Senior Football Championship
Down	Kerry
2–12 (18)	1–13 (16)
- Date: 22 September 1968
- Venue: Croke Park, Dublin
- Referee: Mick Loftus (Mayo)
- Attendance: 71,294

The 1968 All-Ireland Senior Football Championship final was the 81st All-Ireland Final and the deciding match of the 1968 All-Ireland Senior Football Championship, an inter-county Gaelic football tournament for the top teams in Ireland.

This was Down's third appearance in an All-Ireland SFC final, and they won all three. It was the third of three All-Ireland SFC titles won by Down in the 1960s, which made them joint "team of the decade" with Galway who also won three.

In 2018, Martin Breheny listed this as the eleventh greatest All-Ireland Senior Football Championship Final.

== Match ==
=== Summary ===
Seán O'Neill and John Murphy each scored a goal which contributed to Down being in the lead by eight points following eight minutes of play. Kerry never recovered.

Seán O'Neill and John Murphy scored scrappy goals for Down, while Brendan Lynch's goal for Kerry was too late to make a difference.

=== Details ===
22 September 1968
Final

Down	2–12 – 1–13	Kerry
S O'Neill 1–2, P Doherty 0–5, J Murphy 1–0, T O'Hare 0–2, P Rooney 0–2, J Milligan 0–1		B Lynch 1–2, M O'Dwyer 0–5, P Griffin 0–3, M O'Connell 0–2, DJ Crowley 0–1

Croke Park, Dublin
Attendance: 71,294
Referee: Mick Loftus (Mayo)

Down
Kerry

==== Down ====
- 1 D. Kelly
- 2 B. Sloan
- 3 D. McCartan
- 4 T. O'Hare
- 5 R. McConville
- 6 W. Doyle
- 7 J. Lennon (c)
- 8 J. Milligan
- 9 C. McAlarney
- 10 M.Cole
- 11 P. Doherty
- 12 J. Murphy
- 13 P. Rooney
- 14 S. O'Neill
- 15 J. Purdy

Subs used
L. Powell for J. Lennon
G. Glynn for L. Powell

Subs not used
H. McGrath
R. Murphy
V. Kane

Manager
G. Brown

==== Kerry ====
- 1 J. Culloty
- 2 S. Murphy
- 3 P. O'Donoghue
- 4 S. Burrows
- 5 Denis O'Sullivan
- 6 M. Morris
- 7 Donie O'Sullivan
- 8 M. O'Connell
- 9 M. Fleming
- 10 B. Lynch
- 11 P. Griffin (c)
- 12 É. O'Donoghue
- 13 T. Prendergast
- 14 D. J. Crowley
- 15 M. O'Dwyer

Subs used
17 P. Moynihan for T. Prendergast
23 S. Mac Gearailt for S. Burrows

Subs not used
16 Dom O'Donnell
18 M. Ó Sé
19 M. Sheehan
20 P. J. McIntyre
21 M. O'Sullivan
22 T. Bowler
24 D. Lovett
25 J. O'Brien
26 D. Crowley
