= Séamus Mac Gearailt =

Retired Gaelic football trainer, coach, selector and former player

Personal information
- Native name: Séamus Mac Gearailt (Irish)
- Born: 1945 (age 80–81) Corca Dhuibhne, County Kerry, Ireland
- Height: 5 ft 9 in (175 cm)

Sport
- Sport: Gaelic football
- Position: Left corner-back
Clubs
- Years: Club
- An Ghaeltacht; West Kerry
Club titles
- Kerry titles: 0
Inter-county
Years	County	Apps (scores)
1963–1974	Kerry	18 (2-07)
Inter-county titles
- Munster titles: 5
- All-Irelands: 2
- NFL: 6
- All Stars: 0

Séamus Mac Gearailt (born 1945), sometimes referred to as Séamus Fitzgerald, is an Irish retired Gaelic football trainer, coach, selector and former player. His league and championship career with the Kerry senior team spanned twelve seasons from 1963 to 1974.

== Biography ==
Mac Gearailt made his debut on the inter-county scene at the age of sixteen when he was selected as the goalkeeper for the Kerry minor team. He enjoyed two championship seasons with the minor team, winning back-to-back All0Ireland medals in 1962 and 1963. Mac Gearailt subsequently joined the Kerry under-21 team, winning an All-Ireland medal in this grade in 1965. By this stage he had also joined the Kerry senior team, making his debut during the 1962-63 league. Over the course of the next twelve seasons, Mac Gearailt won back-to-back All-Ireland medals in 1969 and 1970. He also won five Munster medals and six National Football League medals. He played his last game for Kerry in July 1974.

After being chosen on the Munster inter-provincial team for the first time in 1964, Mac Gearailt remained off the team until the twilight of his career. As a member of the starting fifteen in 1971 and 1972 he won one Railway Cup medal.

In retirement from playing, Mac Gearailt became involved in team management and coaching. In 1975 he trained the Kerry minor team to the All-Ireland title. He later served as coach and selector with the Kerry under-21 team, helping the team to an All-Ireland title in 1994. As part of Páidí Ó Sé's management team with the Kerry senior footballers, Mac Gearilt helped the team to the All-Ireland title in 1997.

== Honours ==
=== Player ===
Kerry

- All-Ireland Senior Football Championship (2): 1969, 1970
- Munster Senior Football Championship (5): 1964, 1968, 1969, 1970, 1972
- National Football League (6): 1962-63, 1968-69, 1970-71, 1971-72, 1972-73, 1973-74

Munster

- Railway Cup (1): 1972

=== Coach ===
Kerry

- All-Ireland Senior Football Championship (1): 1997
- Munster Senior Football Championship (5): 1996, 1997, 1998
- National Football League (1): 1996-97
