= Pat Griffin =

Irish sportsperson (1944–2019)

Personal information
- Native name: Pádraig Ó Gríofa (Irish)
- Born: 1944 Glenbeigh, County Kerry, Ireland
- Died: 29 October 2019 (aged 75) Clonakilty, County Cork, Ireland
- Occupation: Garda Síochána
- Height: 5 ft 11 in (180 cm)

Sport
- Sport: Gaelic football
- Position: Centre-forward
Clubs
- Years: Club
- Clane; Glenbeigh-Glencar; Clonakilty; Mid Kerry
Club titles
- Kerry titles: 2
Inter-county
Years	County	Apps (scores)
1963–1974	Kerry	29 (2–42)
Inter-county titles
- Munster titles: 6
- All-Irelands: 3
- NFL: 1
- All Stars: 0

Patrick Griffin (1944 – 29 October 2019) was an Irish sportsperson. He played Gaelic football with his local club Glenbeigh-Glencar and Clonakilty in County Cork and was a member of the Kerry senior inter-county team from 1963 until 1974.

== Playing career ==
=== Kerry ===
==== Senior ====
Griffin was added to the Kerry senior team in advance of the 1963 Munster Championship. He made his first appearance for the team on 14 July 1963 when he came on as a substitute for Vincent Lucey at right corner-forward in the Munster final. Griffin ended the game with a winners' medal following the 1–18 to 3–07 defeat of Cork.

On 19 July 1964, Griffin was selected at left wing-forward for the Munster final against Cork. He ended the game with a second Munster Championship medal following the 2–11 to 1–08 victory. On 27 September 1964, Griffin was switched to right wing-forward for the All-Ireland final against Galway. He scored two points from play in the 0–15 to 0–10 defeat.

Griffin was confined to the substitutes' bench for the 1965 Munster Championship, however, he collected a third successive winners' medal as a non-playing substitute on 18 July 1965 after a 2–16 to 2–07 defeat of Limerick in the final. He was reinstated to the starting fifteen at centre-forward for the All-Ireland final against Galway on 26 September 1965. Griffin was once again held scoreless and, for the second successive year, ended on the losing side after a 0–12 to 0–09 defeat.

On 17 July 1966, Griffin was selected at full-forward when Kerry qualified to play Cork in the Munster final. He scored a point from play but ended on the losing side after a 2–07 to 1–07 defeat.

Griffin was switched to midfield for the 1967 Munster final against Cork on 16 July 1967. He scored two points from play but ended on the losing side for a second successive year after an 0–08 to 0–07 defeat.

Griffin was appointed captain of the Kerry senior team for the 1968 season. He collected a fourth Munster Championship medal on 14 July 1968 after captaining the team to a 1–21 to 3–08 defeat of Cork in the final. On 22 September 1968, Griffin captained Kerry to an All-Ireland final appearance against Down. He scored two points from centre-forward but, for the third time in his career, ended on the losing side in an All-Ireland final following a 2–12 to 1–13 defeat.

On 18 May 1969, Griffin was at centre-forward when Kerry defeated Offaly by 3–11 to 0–08 in the National League Home Final. He later missed the two-legged final against New York but was entitled to a winners' medal following the 2–33 to 2–24 aggregate victory. Griffin won a fifth Munster Championship medal on 20 July 1969 after scoring two points from centre-forward in the 0–16 to 1–04 defeat of Cork. He retained his position at centre-forward for the All-Ireland final against Offaly on 28 September 1969. Griffin was held scoreless from play but collected his first All-Ireland medal after the 0–10 to 0–07 victory.

Griffin played in an eighth Munster final on 26 July 1970. Lining out at centre-forward he scored 1–01 from play and claimed a sixth winners' medal after the 2–22 to 2–09 defeat of Cork. On 27 September 1970, Griffin again lined out at centre-forward when Kerry faced Meath in the All-Ireland final. He scored two points from play and claimed a second consecutive All-Ireland medal after the 2–19 to 0–18 victory.

On 20 June 1971, Griffin won a second National League medal after lining out at centre-forward in Kerry's 0–11 to 0–08 defeat of Mayo in the final. He later lined out in a ninth successive Munster final on 18 July 1971, however, he ended the game on the losing side following a 0–25 to 0–14 defeat by Cork.

Griffin won a third National League medal as a non-playing substitute on 14 May 1972 following Kerry's 2–11 to 2–09 defeat of Mayo in the final. He later failed to command a place on the starting fifteen for the Munster Championship but claimed a seventh winners' medal on 16 July 1972 after coming on as a substitute for Éamonn O'Donoghue in the 2–21 to 2–15 defeat of Cork. Griffin again failed to make the starting fifteen for the All-Ireland final against Offaly on 24 September 1972 but came on as a substitute for Liam Higgins in the 1–13 apiece draw. He came on as a substitute for Mick Gleeson in the replay on 15 October 1972 but ended the game on the losing side following a 1–19 to 0–13 defeat.

On 6 May 1973, Griffin won a fourth National League medal as a member of the extended panel following Kerry's 2–12 to 0–14 defeat of Offaly in the final. He was later an unused substitute for Kerry's unsuccessful Munster Championship campaign.

Griffin made his last appearance for Kerry on 16 June 1974 when he came on as a substitute for Mickey Ned O'Sullivan in a 7–16 to 0–08 defeat of Waterford in the Munster semi-final.

Sporting positions
Preceded by Mick Morris	Kerry Senior Football Captain; 1968	Succeeded by Johnny Culloty
