= Mick O'Connell =

Irish Gaelic footballer

Personal information
- Native name: Mícheál Ó Conaill (Irish)
- Nickname: Micko
- Born: 4 January 1937 (age 89) Valentia Island, County Kerry, Ireland
- Occupations: Farmer and fisherman
- Height: 6 ft 0 in (183 cm)

Sport
- Sport: Gaelic football
- Position: Midfield
Clubs
- Years: Club
- Waterville; Young Islanders; South Kerry
Club titles
- Kerry titles: 3
Inter-county
Years	County	Apps (scores)
1956–1974	Kerry	56 (1–121)
Inter-county titles
- Munster titles: 12
- All-Irelands: 4
- NFL: 4
- All Stars: 1

Michael O'Connell (born 4 January 1937) is an Irish former Gaelic footballer. Throughout his 25-year club career, he played for Young Islanders, winning seven South Kerry Championship titles during a golden age for the club; he also played for divisional side South Kerry, and experienced success in the County Championship. At inter-county level, he captained Kerry to win the 1959 All-Ireland Championship; he later claimed a further three All-Ireland medals, as well as Munster Championship and National League successes. A native Irish speaker, O'Connell was named on the GAA Teams of the Century and the Millennium.

== Early life ==
Mick O'Connell was born on Valentia Island, County Kerry in 1937. His father was a fisherman who also worked on the family's small farm on the island. From an early age, O’Connell showed his footballing talent and "inimitable signs of excellence".

== Playing career ==
=== Club ===
O’Connell began his club football career with neighbouring Waterville. When a football club, Young Islanders, was founded on Valentia Island, as per GAA rules O'Connell switched allegiance to his local parish team. He won three Kerry County Championship medals with the South Kerry divisional side.

=== Inter-county ===
==== Underage ====
O'Connell's career with Kerry began in 1955 when he lined out in the Munster Minor Championship. Kerry lost the replayed Munster final to Tipperary.

==== Senior ====
He quickly joined the Kerry senior football team, making his debut in 1956 against Tipperary in the Munster Championship. He later lined out in the Munster final against Cork, but lost out in a replay. Two years later, in 1958, O'Connell won the first of eight Munster titles in a row; however, Kerry suffered a shock defeat by Derry in the All-Ireland semi-final. In 1959 O’Connell was captain when Kerry won the National Football League. He later guided his native county to another Munster title; however, he had to retire injured in Kerry's All-Ireland victory over Galway.

Following a second National League victory in 1961 O'Connell captured his second All-Ireland medal in 1962 when Kerry defeated Roscommon in the final. A third National League victory quickly followed at the start of 1963. After two All-Ireland defeats by Galway in 1964 and 1965 Kerry surrendered their provincial crown to Cork in 1966 and 1967. O'Connell won a ninth Munster title in 1968; however, Kerry lost out to Down in the All-Ireland final. This defeat was followed by a great year of success in 1969 as O'Connell added a fourth National League medal to his collection before winning a tenth Munster title. He later won a third All-Ireland medal following a victory over Offaly.

In 1970 O'Connell entered the third decade of his inter-county football career, winning an eleventh Munster title in the process. A fourth All-Ireland medal quickly followed after a victory over Meath in the first 80-minute All-Ireland final. O'Connell claimed two more National League medals in 1971 and 1972, before winning his twelfth and final provincial medal in 1972. That year Offaly later defeated Kerry in O'Connell's last All-Ireland final appearance. In spite of this loss, he was still presented with an All-Star award. O'Connell retired from inter-county football in 1973.

=== Retirement ===
In retirement from playing O'Connell published his autobiography, A Kerry Footballer, in 1974. Ten years later in 1984, the GAA's centenary year, his reputation as one of the all-time greats was recognised when he was named in the midfield position on the GAA's Football Team of the Century. In 2000 O'Connell was also named on the associations 'Football Team of the Millennium'.

== Personal life ==
In 1972 O'Connell married his wife Rosaleen. They have three children, Máire, Mícheál and Diarmuid. Mícheál married Emma, daughter of then-President Mary McAleese in December 2009 and was appointed as a judge to the High Court in January 2026.

== Career statistics ==
Team	Season	National League			Munster		All-Ireland		Total	
Team	Season	Division	Apps	Score	Apps	Score	Apps	Score	Apps	Score
Kerry	1955-56	Division 1	0	0-00	3	0-01	—		3	0-01
Kerry	1956-57	Division 1	5	0-02	1	0-01	—		6	0-03
Kerry	1957-58	Division 1	4	0-06	2	0-00	1	0-00	7	0-06
Kerry	1958-59	Division 1	7	1-08	2	0-04	2	0-02	11	1-14
Kerry	1959-60	Division 1	7	1-04	2	0-04	2	0-02	11	1-10
Kerry	1960-61	Division 1	8	0-09	3	0-03	1	0-00	12	0-12
Kerry	1961-62	Division 1	4	0-13	2	1-04	2	0-12	8	1-29
Kerry	1962-63	Division 1	2	0-03	2	0-08	1	0-04	5	0-15
Kerry	1963-64	Division 1	6	1-19	2	0-03	2	0-07	10	1-29
Kerry	1964-65	Division 1	4	1-09	2	0-06	2	0-03	8	1-18
Kerry	1965-66	Division 1	3	0-07	2	0-05	—		5	0-12
Kerry	1966-67	Division 1	0	0-00	0	0-00	—		0	0-00
Kerry	1967-68	Division 1	2	0-02	2	0-06	2	0-03	6	0-11
Kerry	1968-69	Division 1	10	3-32	2	0-10	2	0-05	14	3-47
Kerry	1969-70	Division 1	1	0-01	2	0-06	2	0-03	5	0-10
Kerry	1970-71	Division 1	1	0-00	2	0-02	—		3	0-02
Kerry	1971-72	Division 1	8	0-13	2	0-05	3	0-12	13	0-30
Kerry	1972-73	Division 1	1	0-03	0	0-00	—		1	0-03
Kerry	1973-74	Division 1	0	0-00	1	0-00	—		1	0-00
Career total			73	7-131	34	1-68	22	0-53	129	8-252

== Honours ==
Valentia Young Islanders

- South Kerry Senior Football Championship: 1957, 1958, 1959, 1961, 1962, 1964, 1979
- Kerry Novice Football Championship 1975

South Kerry

- Kerry Senior Football Championship: 1955, 1956, 1958

Kerry

- All-Ireland Senior Football Championship: 1959 (c), 1962, 1969, 1970
- Munster Senior Football Championship: 1958, 1959 (c), 1960, 1961, 1962, 1963, 1964, 1965, 1968, 1969, 1970, 1972
- National Football League: 1958–59 (c), 1960–61, 1962–63, 1968–69, 1970–71, 1971–72, 1972–73

Munster

- Railway Cup: 1972

== See also ==
- List of people on the postage stamps of Ireland

Sporting positions
Preceded by Mick Murphy	Kerry Senior Football Captain; 1959	Succeeded by Paudie Sheehy
Achievements
Preceded by Kevin Heffernan	All-Ireland SFC winning captain 1959	Succeeded by Kevin Mussen
