= Paudie O'Donoghue =

Irish Gaelic footballer (1944–2008)

Personal information
- Native name: Páidí Ó Donnchú (Irish)
- Born: Asdee, County Kerry
- Occupation: Secondary teacher

Sport
- Sport: Gaelic football
- Position: Full-back
Club
- Years: Club
- 1960s–1970s: Ballylongford
Club titles
- Kerry titles: 3
- Munster titles: 1
Inter-county
Years	County	Apps (scores)
1964–1974	Kerry	34 (0–00)
Inter-county titles
- Munster titles: 5
- All-Irelands: 2
- NFL: 5
- All Stars: 0

Paudie O'Donoghue (1944–2008) was an Irish sportsperson. He played Gaelic football with his local club Ballylongford and was a member of the Kerry senior inter-county team from 1964 until 1974.

== Club ==
O'Donoghue played his club football with both Ballylongford and Shannon Rangers. It was a very successful time for both sides during his career.

He won his first Kerry Senior Football Championship title in 1964 when the North Kerry side overcame East Kerry in the final. They would later go on to win the first ever Munster Senior Club Football Championship by beating Clare champions Cooraclare.

He lined out in a second final in 1971 where Rangers lost out to Mid Kerry. The following season O'Donoghue and co qualified for another final where they again faced Mid Kerry, the result went the way of the North Kerry side as O'Donoghue picked up his second county title as was also the side captain.

He was again on the losing side in 1974 to Kenmare. In 1977 O'Donoghue was now a veteran of the team and lined out in an all North Kerry final against Feale Rangers. In the end O'Donoghue won his third title.

He also had much success with Ballylongford . He won North Kerry Senior Football Championship titles in 1968, 1970, 1971, 1974 and 1975. He also won three Kerry Intermediate Football Championship in 1971 as captain,1976 and 1977.

== College ==
During his student days he played with UCD. He won two Dublin Senior Football Championship with the college in 1963 and 1965, as well as two Dublin Co Leagues.

== Underage ==
He first played with Kerry at minor level. In 1962 he won a Munster Minor Football Championship after a win over Cork in the final. Kerry later qualified for the All-Ireland Minor Football Championship where they faced Mayo. A 6-05 to 0-07 win see O'Donoghue pick up a winner's medal.

He then moved on the Under 21 side. He 1962 while till a minor he won his first Munster Under-21 Football Championship after a win over Cork in the final. There was no All-Ireland championship that season.

He was still underage when he picked up a second Munster title in 1964 after a win over Tipperary in the final. Kerry later qualified for the inaugural All-Ireland Under-21 Football Championship where they faced Laois. In the end the title went to the Kerrymen and O'Donoghue added an U21 medal to his collection.

== Junior ==
he made one appearance for the Kerry Junior side. Playing in a Munster quarter-final win over Clare in 1963.

== Senior ==
On the back of his displays at underage level he joined the Kerry senior team during the 1962–63 National Football League playing in three games but missing out on the final win over New York.

During the 1963–64 National Football League he played three games including the semi-final loss to Dublin.

He made his championship debut in the Munster semi-final against Tipperary. He later lined out in his first Munster final against Cork. In the end a 2-11 to 1-08 win saw young O'Donoghue add a Munster senior medal to his collocation. On his first Croke Park appearance he lined out against Cavan in the All-Ireland semi-final. In the end a 2-12 to 0-06 win saw O'Donoghue and co qualify for the All-Ireland final. In the final Kerry faced Galway. It was a repeat of the previous years semi-final, a game O'Donoghue didn't play in, and like then it was the same result as the men from the West took the title on a 0-15 to 0-10 scoreline.

O'Donoghe and Kerry qualified for the final of 1964–65 National Football League in what was a repeat of the previous year's All-Ireland final. In the end the title went to Galway on a 1-07 to 0-08 win.

Come championship he missed the Munster semi-final win over Clare but was back in the starting lineup for the final. In the final Kerry took on Limerick. The Kingdom proved too strong as O'Donoghue picked up his second Munster medal after a 2-16 to 2-07 win. Kerry accounted for Dublin in the All-Ireland semi-final with little fuss on a 4-08 to 2-06 scoreline. This set up an All-Ireland final with Galway for the second year in a row and a repeat of that spring's League final. The result was the same on both counts as Galway took the title on a 0-12 to 0-09.

There would be no success for the next few seasons as back-to-back Munster final losses to Cork in 1966 and 1967.

After losing out the previous two season O' Donoghue picked up his third Munster medal after a 1-21 to 3-08 win over Cork in the final. In a novel All-Ireland semi-final Kerry faced Longford. In a close clash the Munster men did enough to end on the right side of a 2-13 to 2-11 scoreline. This saw O'Donoghue line out in his third All-Ireland final with Kerry's foes from the early part of the decade Down. The title sent North once more after a 2-12 to 1-13 win and O'Donoghue was an All-Ireland Runner-up for the third time.

During the 1968–69 National Football League O'Donoghue lined out in his first final as Kerry faced New York. A replay was needed where O'Donoghue picked up his first winners medal after a 2-21 to 2-12 win.

In the championship straightforward wins over Waterford and Cork seen O'Donoghue pick up his fourth Munster title in six seasons. In the All-Ireland semi-final Kerry faced Mayo. They got over the line by the bar minimum on a 0-14 to 1-10 scoreline. This seen Kerry back in another All-Ireland final this time against Offaly. After being on the losing side three times 0-10 to 0-07 win saw O'Donoghue finally get his hands on an All-Ireland senior medal to add to his Minor and Under 21 titles.

O'Donoghue picked up his fifth Munster title with little fuss after wins over Limerick and Cork. In the All-Ireland semi-final Paudie and co faced Ulster champions Derry. While Kerry had struggled with Ulster teams in the 60s they made light work of the Derry men winning on a 0-23 to 0-10. For the second season in a row, it was a Munster v Leinster final as the Kingdom faced Meath. Kerry won convincingly on a 2-19 to 0-18 scoreline with late goals by Din Joe Crowley and Mick Gleeson. It was O'Donoghue's second and final All-Ireland medal.

Kerry were back in the final of the 1970-71 National Football League. In the final Kerry faced Mayo. In a close game O'Donoghue picked up his second League medal.

Despite being on course for three All-Ireland titles in a row Kerry's season came to a crashing end when they lost to Cork in the Munster final on a 0-25 to 0-14 scoreline.

Kerry were back in a final of the 1971-72 National Football League. In the final Kerry again faced Mayo. In yet another close game O'Donoghue picked up his third League medal.

After the disappointment of 1971 O'Donoghue picked up his sixth Munster title after a win over holders Cork in the final. In the All-Ireland semi-final Kerry powered past Roscommon on a 1-22 to 1-12 scoreline to make a return to the All-Ireland final. In the final it was a repeat of the 1970 clash with Offaly. The sides couldn't be separated and a 1-13 each scoreline was the result. In the replay Kerry would suffer their biggest All-Ireland final loss as they sent down on a 1-19 to 0-13 scoreline.

In 1973 O'Donoghue was captained of a Kerry side in transition. He led his side to a third National Football League title in a row as Kerry got revenge on Offaly in the final. Come championship Kerry suffered a heavy loss to Cork in the Munster final.

Kerry won the 1973-74 National Football League after a win over Roscommon in a re-play to give O'Donoghue his fourth in a row and fifth overall medal. For the second season in a row Kerry lost to Cork in the Munster final in O'Donoghue's final game in the Green and Gold.

== Interprovincal ==
O'Donoghue also lined out with Munster in the Railway Cup. However he had little success in the Interprovincal championship during the 1960s and 70s.

Sporting positions
Preceded by Tom Prendergast	Kerry Senior Football Captain; 1973	Succeeded by John O'Keeffe
