= Johnny Culloty =

Irish hurler and Gaelic footballer (1936–2025)

Personal information
- Native name: Seánaí Ó Collata (Irish)
- Born: 1936 Killarney, County Kerry, Ireland
- Died: 24 February 2025 (aged 88) Killarney, County Kerry, Ireland
- Occupation: Psychiatric nurse
- Height: 5 ft 10 in (178 cm)

Sport
- Football Position: Forward, goalkeeper
- Hurling Position: Forward
Club
- Years: Club
- 1950s-1970s 1950s-1970s 1980s: Killarney Legion
Club titles
- Munster titles: 2
- All-Ireland Titles: 1
	Football	Hurling
Kerry titles	4	1
Inter-county
Years	County	Apps (scores)
1955-1971	Kerry (F); Kerry (H)	44 (1-01)
Inter-county titles
	Football	Hurling
Munster Titles	12	0
All-Ireland Titles	5	0
League titles	5	4 Div 2
All-Stars	0	0

Johnny Culloty (1936 – 24 February 2025) was a Gaelic football and hurling sportsman from Killarney, County Kerry. He played both football and hurling with Kerry from the 1950s till the 1970s, winning All Ireland and National League titles in both. As a dual player at club level, he won county championships in both codes.

== Club career ==
Culloty played his club football with the Killarney Legion club as well as the East Kerry team. With East Kerry he won four County Championship and two Munster Championship titles.

He played hurling with the Killarney and St Patrick's (East Kerry) teams. Over the course of his career, he won one County Hurling Championship, three Minor Championships, and four Intermediate Championships.

== Inter-county career ==
Culloty first played with Kerry when he lined out in goal for the county minor hurlers when he was just 14 in a Munster Championship game with Limerick. He later joined the county minor football panel where he won a Munster Championship in 1954. That same year he was part of the Kerry junior side that won both Munster and All Ireland titles. The following year he joined the senior team. Although more known as a goalkeeper, his first game was as a forward when he came on as a sub in that year's Munster final win over Cork. He kept his place for the rest of the year finishing off with a win over Dublin in the final.

He would play as an outfield player for the league campaigns in 1956, 1958 and beginning of 1959. It was in the second game of the 1959 league in a game with Galway that he first lined out in goal, a position he would keep until his retirement after the 1971 championship.

He played his first championship game in 4 seasons when he lined out in the first round of the 1959 championship, where Kerry overcame Tipperary and went on to win the Munster championship after defeating Cork in the final. The semifinal was a repeat of the 1955 final as Kerry took on Dublin, the result also repeating with Kerry winning in the end. It then set up an All Ireland final with Galway, who had been All Ireland champions only three years before. Kerry ran out 3-07 to 1-04 winners, giving Culloty his second All Ireland medal.

Kerry retained their Munster title in 1960 with wins over Tipperary and surprise finalists Waterford. It then set up a repeat of the previous years final with Galway in the semifinal. In this game, Kerry won on a 1-08 to 0-08 scoreline. This set up an All Ireland final with first-time finalists Down. Despite being favorites to retain their title, Down picked up a surprise victory, and their first title. Kerry started off the year by winning the National League for the second time in three years and gave Culloty his second league title. They once again retained their Munster title with wins over Clare and Cork in the Munster final, but only after a replay. This set up a repeat of the previous year's final but, once again, Down came out on top, en route to a second All Ireland in a row. While Culloty did not win an All Ireland in football, he did so in hurling, scoring 2 goals in the All Ireland Junior Hurling Championship 'home final' in Croke Park against Meath, Kerry went on to defeat London in the final proper.

In 1962, Kerry and Culloty picked up a fourth Munster title in a row following wins over Waterford and Cork. This set up an All Ireland semifinal with Dublin, a team Kerry hadn't played in Championship since 1959. In the end, it was a repeat of that fixture, with Kerry the 2-12 to 0-10 winners in the end. This set up a novel pairing in the final, as Roscommon qualified. It was to be the third time the sides met in the final and the first since 1946. Going into the game, each team had won one each but, in the end, Kerry came out 1-12 to 0-06 winners, to leap-frog the Connacht team in the head-to-head and, in the process, give Culloty his third All Ireland title.

1963 started off with Culloty picking up his 3rd National League title. Wins over Tipperary and Cork meant a fifth Munster title in a row. This set up an All Ireland semifinal with Galway, a team Kerry and Culloty had dominated in the past. However, much like three years before against Down, Kerry were shocked as Galway picked up a 1-07 to 0-08 win, on the way to an All Ireland title.

In 1964, his sixth Munster title in a row was picked up after wins over Tipperary and Cork. This set up a first championship meeting since 1955 with Cavan in the semifinal, with Kerry winning by 2-12 to 0-06. This set up an All Ireland final with defending champions Galway. However, for the second year in a row, victory went to the Connacht men, on a 0-15 to 0-10 scoreline.

1965 saw a seventh Munster title for Kerry, after wins over Clare and, for the first time since 1960, Cork weren't Kerry's opponents in the Munster final as they overcame Limerick. This was the first of only two meetings of the two sides during Culloty's playing career. Culloty missed out on Kerry's semifinal win over Dublin. He was back for the All Ireland final where, for the third year in a row, Kerry faced Galway and, for the third year, they were beaten, this time by 0-12 to 0-09.

In 1966, Kerry were going for an eighth Munster title in a row. They started off with a win over Tipperary but lost to Cork in the final. This was Culloty's final year and was the only year not to make it outside of Munster.

Culloty played no part in the league of Munster championship campaign of 1967 when Kerry lost once more to Cork in the Munster final.

He played no part in the 1968 league or Munster championship. Kerry won the title, to set up a first championship meeting with first-time Leinster Champions Longford. Culloty returned to the team and they won 2-13 to 2-11. This set up an All Ireland final with Down. It was the first championship meeting between the sides since the 1961 semifinal. In the end, Down kept their 100% record against Kerry, a record that still stands today.

Culloty was made Kerry captain in 1969. He led his side to their first league title since 1963, giving Culloty a fourth title. Wins over Waterford and Cork give him his 11th Munster title. The All Ireland semi set up a meeting with Mayo, the result being a one-point win, on a 0-14 to 1-10 score line for Kerry. Another novel pairing awaited in the final, as Kerry faced Offaly for the final time. In the end, Kerry were 0-10 to 0-07 winners, giving Culloty the honor of accepting the cup as captain, and a fourth All Ireland title.

1970 saw Culloty pick up his 12th and final Munster championship title, following wins over Limerick and Cork. Kerry had 13 points to spare in the semifinal against Derry, setting up an All Ireland final meeting with Meath. In a high-scoring game, Kerry were 2-19 to 0-18 winners, giving Culloty his fifth and final All Ireland medal. He also won a Munster Intermediate Hurling Championship title after overcoming Cork in the final.

In what was to be his last season as a player, Culloty won a fifth National League title. Kerry began their Munster campaign with a win over Tipperary to set up a Munster final with Cork. However, Kerry and Culloty ended up on the wrong side of a 0-15 to 0-14 scoreline.

During his career he played in a number of Railway Cup campaigns with Munster but did not win any titles with them. He also won two National Hurling League titles during his hurling career.

== Management career ==
In 1972, a year after retiring from playing, he became manager of the Kerry team. He had mixed fortunes as a manager. In his first year in charge he won both National League and Munster titles, while again leading his side to an All Ireland final against then-champions Offaly. A 1-13 apiece draw meant that the sides would have to meet again. In the replay, Kerry were totally outclassed and lost, on what is still a record All-Ireland-final loss for a Kerry team, on a 1-19 to 0-13 scoreline. Despite National League titles in 1973-74, Culloty's side failed to make the breakthrough in Munster, losing to Cork in both years. Culloty stepped down as manager after the 1974 season, being succeeded by former teammate Mick O'Dwyer.

== Death ==
Culloty died on 24 February 2025, at the age of 88.

== Honours ==
=== Player ===
Killarney Legion

- East Kerry Senior Football Championship: 1953, 1954, 1955, 1967

Killarney

- Kerry Senior Hurling Championship: 1969
- Kerry Minor Hurling Championship: 1950, 1951, 1952

East Kerry

- Kerry Senior Football Championship: 1965, 1968, 1969, 1970

Kerry

- All-Ireland Senior Football Championship: 1955, 1959, 1962, 1969 (c), 1970
- Munster Senior Football Championship: 1955, 1958, 1959, 1960, 1961, 1962, 1963, 1964, 1965, 1968, 1969 (c), 1970
- National Football League Division 1: 1958–59, 1960–61, 1962–63, 1968–69, 1970–71
- National Hurling League Division 2: 1956–57, 1961–62, 1966–67, 1967–68
- All-Ireland Junior Hurling Championship: 1961
- All-Ireland Junior Football Championship: 1954
- Munster Junior Football Championship: 1954
- Munster Minor Football Championship: 1954

=== Management ===
Kerry

- All-Ireland Senior Football Championship: 2004, 2006
- Munster Senior Football Championship: 1972, 2004, 2005
- National Football League Division 1: 1971–72, 1972–73, 1973–74, 2004, 2006
- All-Ireland Under-21 Football Championship: 1998
- Munster Under-21 Football Championship: 1998, 1999

== Sources ==
- East Kerry profiles

Sporting positions
Preceded by Pat Griffin	Kerry senior football team captain 1969	Succeeded by Donie O'Sullivan
Achievements
Preceded by Joe Lennon	All-Ireland Senior Football winning captain 1969	Succeeded by Donie O'Sullivan
