= 1972 All-Ireland Senior Football Championship =

Football championship

Championship details
- Dates: 7 May – 15 October 1972
- Teams: 31

All-Ireland Champions
- Winning team: Offaly (2nd win)
- Captain: Tony McTague
- Manager: Fr. Tom Scully

All-Ireland Finalists
- Losing team: Kerry
- Captain: Tom Prendergast
- Manager: Johnny Culloty

Provincial Champions
- Munster: Kerry
- Leinster: Offaly
- Ulster: Donegal
- Connacht: Roscommon

Championship statistics
- No. matches played: 34
- Top Scorer: Tony McTague (0–36)
- Player of the Year: Willie Bryan

The 1972 All-Ireland Senior Football Championship was the 86th staging of the All-Ireland Senior Football Championship, the Gaelic Athletic Association's premier inter-county Gaelic football tournament. The championship began on 7 May 1972 and ended on 15 October 1972.

Offaly entered the championship as the defending champions.

On 15 October 1972, Offaly won the championship following a 1–19 to 0–13 defeat of Kerry in the All-Ireland final replay. This was their second All-Ireland title.

Offaly's Tony McTague was the championship's top scorer with 0–36. Offaly's Willie Bryan was the choice for Texaco Footballer of the Year.

== Results ==
=== Connacht Senior Football Championship ===
Quarter-final

11 June 1972 Quarter-final	Roscommon	1–11 – 0–5	Leitrim	Dr. Hyde Park, Roscommon
	M Freyne 0–6, D Earley 0–4, J Kelly 1–0, M Fallon 0–1.		P McGarty 0–2, S Flanaghan 0–1, D Keegan 0–1, B Galligan 0–1.	Attendance: 4,500; Referee: R Lane (Sligo)

Semi-finals

18 June 1972 Semi-final	Sligo	2–7 – 1–10	Mayo	Markievicz Park, Sligo
	M Kearins 0–6, J Colleary 1–0, G Mitchell 1–0, P Kearins 0–1.		T O'Malley 0–6, W McGee 1–1, D Griffith 0–1, S O'Grady 0–1, F Burns 0–1.	Referee: P Kelly (Dublin)

25 June 1972 Semi-final	Roscommon	3–9 – 2–12	Galway	Dr. Hyde Park, Roscommon
	M Freyne 1–2, J Hunt 1–0, M Flanagan 1–0, J Kelly 0–3, J Mannion 0–2, J Finnegan 0–2.		J Tobin 1–9, T Naughton 1–0, J Duggan 0–2, W Joyce 0–1.	Referee: M Connaughton (Mayo)

2 July 1972 Semi-final replay	Mayo	1–18 – 0–17	Sligo	MacHale Park, Castlebar
	T O'Malley 1–3, J Corcoran 0–5, S Kilbride 0–3, S O'Grady 0–2, T Fitzgerald 0–2, G Feeney 0–1, J. J. Cribbin 0–1, D Griffith 0–1.		M Kearins 0–14, D Pugh 0–2, J Colleary 0–1.	Attendance: 16,872; Referee: S Martin (Roscommon)

9 July 1972 Semi-final replay	Galway	0–7 – 1–8	Roscommon	Tuam Stadium, Tuam
	J Keenan 0–2, J Tobin 0–2, S Leydon 0–1, T Naughton 0–1, M Burke 0–1.		J Kelly 1–0, D Earley 0–3, M Flanagan 0–2, M Freyne 0–1, J Finnegan 0–1, J Mannion 0–1.	Referee: F Tierney (Cavan)

Final

16 July 1972 Final	Mayo	3–10 – 5–8	Roscommon	MacHale Park, Castlebar
	J. J. Cribbin 2–0, W McGee 1–0, J Corcoran 0–3, S O'Grady 0–2, D Griffith 0–2, T O'Malley 0–2, B O'Reilly 0–1.		J Kelly 2–2, D Earley 1–2, M Freyne 1–2, M Flanagan 1–0, T Hunt 0–1, J Mannion 0–1.	Referee: T Moran (Leitrim)

=== Leinster Senior Football Championship ===
First round

7 May 1972 First round	Carlow	0–16 – 0–9	Wexford	Nowlan Park, Kilkenny
	T King 0–8, W Cullen 0–3, T Geoghegan 0–3, P McNally 0–1, C Hughes 0–1.		M Carty 0–3, A Merrigan 0–2, L Byrne 0–2, N Sheridan 0–1, Jim Berry 0–1.

7 May 1972 First round	Longford	4–9 – 0–5	Wicklow	O'Moore Park, Portlaoise
	S Donnelly 2–0, J Halpin 1–1, J Hanniffy 0–4, P Burke 1–0, T Mulvihill 0–2, T Farrell 0–2.		M Kennedy 0–2, L Loughlin 0–1, M McNamee 0–1, S Murray 0–1.	Referee: M Spain (Offaly)

Second round

28 May 1972 Second round	Longford	5–5 – 3–7	Louth	Croke Park, Dublin
	S Donnelly 2–1, J Hanniffy 1–2, S Lee 1–1, T Mulvihill 1–0, F Farrell 0–1.		J Byrne 3–0, R Barry 0–3, E Sheelin 0–3, G Sheridan 0–1.	Referee: P Kelly (Dublin)

28 May 1972 Second round	Laois	1–7 – 1–5	Carlow	Geraldine Park, Athy
	B Lalor 1–0, D Byrne 0–2, J Lalor 0–2, R Miller 0–1, A Purcell 0–1, S Allen 0–1.		B McNally 1–2, S King 0–2, C Hughes 0–1.	Referee: L Foley (Kilkenny)

Quarter-finals

11 June 1972 Quarter-final	Longford	1–9 – 0–16	Meath	Croke Park, Dublin
	S Donnelly 1–2, S Lee 0–2, K Canavan 0–1, F Farrell 0–1, J Halpin 0–1, B Smith 0–1, J Hanniffy 0–1.		M Fay 0–8, T Brennan 0–2, J Daly 0–2, D Connolly 0–2, J Fay 0–1, M Kerrigan 0–1.

11 June 1972 Quarter-final	Dublin	2–8 – 0–8	Westmeath	Croke Park, Dublin
	M Whelan 2–4, L Foley 0–2, P Wilson 0–1, F Murray 0–1.		M Carley 0–3, P Buckley 0–2, V Murray 0–2, M Fagan 0–1.	Referee: R Barry (Meath)

11 June 1972 Quarter-final	Kildare	1–11 – 0–7	Laois	Páirc Tailteann, Navan
	P Dunny 1–2, M Mullins 0–5, K Kelly 0–3, R Flanagan 0–1.		A O'Brien 0–4, M Buggy 0–2, H Mulhaire 0–1.	Attendance: 15,000; Referee: B Hayden (Carlow)

Semi-finals

25 June 1972 Semi-final	Offaly	2–17 – 3–5	Meath	Croke Park, Dublin
	T McTague 0–8, N Clavin 0–4, W Bryan 1–0, S Evans 1–0, S Cooney 0–2, S Darby 0–1, P Fenning 0–1, K Kilmurray 0–1.		T Brennan 1–2, K Rennicks 1–0, J Fay 1–0, M Kerrigan 0–3.	Referee: B Hayden (Carlow)

2 July 1972 Semi-final	Kildare	0–16 – 3–5	Dublin	Páirc Tailteann, Navan
	J Donnelly 0–6, K Kelly 0–3, T Carew 0–3, P Dunny 0–2, T O'Brien 0–1, M Mullins 0–1.		B Casey 1–1, L Foley 1–1, J Keaveney 1–0, M Whelan 0–2, J Reilly 0–1.	Referee: G Hoey (Louth)

Final

23 July 1972 Final	Offaly	1–18 – 2–8	Kildare	Croke Park, Dublin
	Tony McTague 0–6 (0-4f), Sean Cooney 1–2, Willie Bryan 0–3, Nick Clavin 0–2, Eugene Mulligan, Kevin Kilmurray, Sean Evans, Seamus Darby, Murt Connor 0–1 each		Mick Mullins 1–1, Kevin Kelly 1–0, Jack Donnelly (0-3f) and Pat Dunny (0-3f) 0–3 each, Hugh Hyland 0–1.	Attendance: 30,074; Referee: George Hoey (Louth)

=== Munster Senior Football Championship ===
Quarter-finals

14 May 1972 Quarter-final	Limerick	0–8 – 0–10	Waterford	FitzGerald Park, Kilmallock
	M Tynan 0–3, K Rennison 0–1, J Burke 0–1, M Graham 0–1, D Cullinane 0–1, C Cregan 0–1.		T Power 0–3, P Walsh 0–2, T Casey 0–2, P Walsh 0–2, M Cronin 0–1.	Referee: J Moloney (Tipperary)

14 May 1972 Quarter-final	Clare	1–6 – 2–10	Tipperary	Gaelic Grounds, Limerick
	G McAlness 1–1, P Cotter 0–3, S Moloney 0–1, M Chambers 0–1.		L Moyles 2–1, J Cummins 0–5, M Keating 0–2, J Kehoe 0–1, V O'Donnell 0–1.	Referee: S O'Connor (Limerick)

Semi-finals

11 June 1972 Semi-final	Tipperary	0–9 – 1–12	Kerry	Ned Hall Park, Clonmel
	M Keating 0–4, V O'Donnell 0–1, M Ryan 0–1, C McElwee 0–1, P O'Connor 0–1, S Kearney 0–1.		L Higgins 1–2, M O'Dwyer 0–3, M O'Connell 0–3, E O'Donoghue 0–2, B Lynch 0–1, M Gleeson 0–1.	Referee: S Dalton (Waterford)

11 June 1972 Semi-final	Cork	2–8 – 0–9	Waterford	Páirc MacGearailt, Fermoy
	D McCarthy 1–2, D Coughlan 0–5, D Allen 1–0, KJ O'Sullivan 0–1.		T Power 0–4, T Casey 0–2, P McMahon 0–2, B Fleming 0–1.	Referee: J Moloney (Tipperary)

Final

16 July 1972 Final	Kerry	2–21 – 2–15	Cork	Fitzgerald Stadium, Killarney
	M O'Dwyer 0–10, M Gleeson 1–1, L Higgins 0–4, D Kavanagh 1–0, M O'Connell 0–2, J O'Keeffe 0–2, B Lynch 0–2.		R Cummins 0–9, D Coughlan 1–1, D Barron 0–2, D Hunt 0–1, D McCarthy 0–1, KJ O'Sullivan 0–1.	Attendance: 29,827; Referee: J Moloney (Tipperary)

=== Ulster Senior Football Championship ===
Preliminary round

4 June 1972 Preliminary round	Fermanagh	0–7 – 5–7	Derry	St. Molaise Park, Irvinestown
	P McGinnitty 0–2, S Quinn 0–2, G Magee 0–1, A Henderson 0–1, E McPartlan 0–1.		H Niblock 2–1, F O'Loane 0–4, M McGuckian 1–0, L Diamond 1–0, A McGurk 1–0, A McGuckian 0–1, S O'Connell 0–1.	Referee: P Devlin (Tyrone)

Quarter-finals

4 June 1972 Quarter-final	Tyrone	0–13 – 1–7	Armagh	O'Neill Park, Dungannon
	P Harte 0–3, P Hetherington 0–3, B Dolan 0–2, F McGuigan 0–2, H Crawford 0–1, J Foley 0–1, P Mulgrew 0–1.		J Smith 1–1, P Loughran 0–3, J O'LOan 0–2, L McCabe 0–1.	Referee: T Johnson (Fermanagh)

11 June 1972 Quarter-final	Cavan	3–9 – 0–6	Monaghan	Casement Park, Belfast
	P Brady 1–3, M Reilly 1–2, H McInerney 1–1, D Fitzpatrick 0–2, R Carolan 0–1.		E Tavey 0–3, D McCabe 0–1, G Fitzpatrick 0–1, P Donnelly 0–1.	Referee: P Greene (Antrim)

18 June 1972 Quarter-final	Donegal	1–8 – 0–8	Down	MacCumhaill Park, Ballybofey
	S Granaghan 1–1, D O'Carroll 0–4, J Winston 0–2, M Carney 0–1.		S O'Neill 0–4, J Burns 0–3, A King 0–1.	Referee: F Tierney (Cavan)

25 June 1972 Quarter-final	Derry	2–9 – 2–5	Antrim	Dean McGlinchey Park, Ballinascreen
	A McGuckin 1–2, H Niblock 1–1, F O'Loane 0–2, T McGuinness 0–1, S O'Connell 0–1, C Mullan 0–1, L Diamond 0–1.		PI O'Hare 1–1, A Hamill 1–0, A McCallin 0–2, G McCann 0–1, A Scullion 0–1.	Referee: F Tierney (Cavan)

Semi-finals

2 July 1972 Semi-final	Donegal	0–12 – 2–6	Cavan	St. Molaise Park, Irvinestown
	J Winston 0–10, M McMenamin 0–1, J Granaghan 0–1.		J Duggan 1–1, M O'Reilly 1–0, JJ O'Reilly 0–1, P Brady 0–1, J McGuigan 0–1, H Newman 0–1, D Fitzpatrick 0–1.	Referee: M Loftus (Mayo)

9 July 1972 Semi-final	Tyrone	1–8 – 0–9	Derry	O'Neill Park, Dungannon
	P Hetherington 0–5, F Quinn 1–0, B Dolan 0–2, H Crawford 0–1.		S Lagan 0–5, T McGuinness 0–2, A McGuirk 0–1, G O'Loughlin 0–1.	Referee: P Greene (Antrim)

16 July 1972 Semi-final replay	Donegal	2–11 – 1–9	Cavan	St. Tiernach's Park, Clones
	J Winston 0–9, M Carney 1–1, S Granaghan 0–1.		S Duggan 0–6, H McInerney 1–1, B O'Donohue (1–0, own goal), J Cusack 0–1, S McGuigan 0–1.	Referee: M Loftus (Mayo)

Final

30 July 1972 Final	Donegal	2–13 – 1–11	Tyrone	St. Tiernach's Park, Clones
	S Bonner 1–0, M Sweeney 1–0, J Winston 0–5, B McEniff 0–2, D Carroll 0–2, S Granaghan 0–2, M McMenamin 0–1, F McFeely 0–1.		B Dolan 1–4, P Hetherington 0–6, H Crawford 0–1.	Referee: F Tierney (Cavan)

=== All-Ireland Senior Football Championship ===
Semi-finals

13 August 1972 Semi-final	Kerry	1–22 – 1–12	Roscommon	Croke Park, Dublin
	M O'Dwyer 0–8, M O'Connell 0–4, B Lynch 0–4, D Kavanagh 1–0, L Higgins 0–3, M Gleeson 0–2, T Prendergast 0–1.		D Earley 1–3, M Freyne 0–6, J Finnegan 0–1, J Kelly 0–1.	Attendance: 31,455; Referee: F Tierney (Cavan)

20 August 1972 Semi-final	Offaly	1–17 – 2–10	Donegal	Croke Park, Dublin
	T McTague 0–6, K Kilmurray 1–2, W Bryan 0–4, J Cooney 0–3, L Coughlan 0–2.		M Carney 1–1, S Granaghan 1–1, J Winston 0–3, D O'Carroll 0–3, J Hannigan 0–1, F McFeely 0–1.	Attendance: 26,606; Referee: J Martin (Roscommon)

Finals

24 September 1972 Final	Offaly	1–13 – 1–13	Kerry	Croke Park, Dublin
	T McTague 0–6, J Cooney 1–2, P Fenning 0–2, J Smith 0–2, K Kilmurray 0–1.		B Lynch 1–7, M O'Dwyer 0–5, M O'Connell 0–1.	Attendance: 72,032; Referee: F Tierney (Cavan)

15 October 1972 Final replay	Offaly	1–19 – 0–13	Kerry	Croke Park, Dublin
	T McTague 0–10, P Fenning 1–1, M Connor 0–2, S Darby, 0–2, W Bryan 0–3, K Kilmurray 0–1.		M O'Connell 0–7, B Lynch 0–2, L Higgins 0–2, M O'Dwyer 0–2.	Attendance: 66,136; Referee: P Devlin (Tyrone)

== Championship statistics ==
=== Miscellaneous ===
- Omagh's pitch is named as Healy Park after Michael Healy.
- On 14 May 1972, FitzGerald Park, Killmallock hosted its first game for 20 years the Munster Quarter-Final meeting of Limerick vs Waterford.
- Tyrone qualify for the Ulster final for the first time since 1957.
- Donegal become the 8th team to win the Ulster title when they claim their first provincial championship with a 2–13 to 1–11 defeat of Tyrone.
- The All-Ireland semi-final meeting between Donegal and Offaly is the very first championship clash between the two teams. It is also Donegal's first championship match to be played at Croke Park, Dublin.
- The All-Ireland final ends in a draw and goes to a replay for the first time since 1952.
- Offaly win back-to-back All-Ireland titles for the first and only time in their history. Their 1–19 to 0–13 All-Ireland final replay victory remains Kerry's biggest ever defeat in a championship decider.

=== Scoring ===
Overall

Rank	Player	County	Tally	Total	Matches	Average
1	Tony McTague	Offaly	0–36	36	5	7.20
2	Joe Winston	Donegal	0–29	29	5	5.80
3	Mick O'Dwyer	Kerry	0–28	28	5	6.60
4	Mickey Freyne	Roscommon	2–17	23	5	4.60
5	Brendan Lynch	Kerry	1–16	19	5	3.80
6	Dermot Earley	Roscommon	2–12	18	5	3.60
7	Mick O'Connell	Kerry	0–17	17	5	3.40
8	Seán Cooney	Offaly	2–9	15	5	3.00
9	John Tobin	Galway	1–11	14	2	7.00
9	Liam Higgins	Kerry	1–11	14	5	2.80

Single game

Rank	Player	County	Tally	Total	Opposition
1	John Tobin	Galway	1–9	12	Roscommon
2	Mickey Whelan	Dublin	2–4	10	Westmeath
2	Brendan Lynch	Kerry	1–7	10	Offaly
2	Tony McTague	Offaly	0–10	10	Kerry
2	Mick O'Dwyer	Kerry	0–10	10	Cork
2	Joe Winston	Donegal	0–10	10	Cavan
7	Johnny Byrne	Louth	3–0	9	Longford
7	Ray Cummins	Cork	0–9	9	Kerry
7	Joe Winston	Donegal	0–9	9	Cavan
10	Johnny Kelly	Roscommon	2–2	8	Mayo
10	Tom King	Carlow	0–8	8	Wexford
10	Mick Fay	Meath	0–8	8	Longford
10	Tony McTague	Offaly	0–8	8	Meath
10	Mick O'Dwyer	Kerry	0–8	8	Roscommon
