= Jackie Lyne =

Irish Gaelic football player (1923–1993)

Personal information
- Native name: Seánín Ó Laighin (Irish)
- Born: 1923 Killarney, County Kerry, Ireland
- Died: 15 December 1993 (aged 70) Killarney, County Kerry, Ireland

Sport
- Sport: Gaelic football
- Position: Centre-back
Club
- Years: Club
- Killarney Legion
Club titles
- Kerry titles: 1
Inter-county*
Years	County	Apps (scores)
1943-1954	Kerry	34 (5-12)
Inter-county titles
- Munster titles: 8
- All-Irelands: 2
- NFL: 0
- *Inter County team apps and scores correct as of 23:57, 11 December 2016.

Jackie Lyne (1923 - 15 December 1993) was an Irish Gaelic football trainer, selector and player. His league and championship career at senior level with the Kerry county team spanned twelve seasons from 1943 to 1954.

Born in Killarney, County Kerry, Lyne was raised in a family that had a strong association with the game of Gaelic football. His brothers, Dinny and Mikey, both enjoyed All-Ireland success with Kerry. Lyne's nephew, Pat Spillane, was an eight-time All-Ireland medal winner with Kerry between 1975 and 1986.

Lyne played competitive Gaelic football during his schooling at St. Brendan's College. Here he claimed a Dunloe Cup medal before later winning county senior championship medals as a dual player. Lyne subsequently joined the Killarney Legion club and enjoyed an eighteen-year senior championship career, winning one county senior championship medal in 1946.

Lyne made his debut on the inter-county scene at the age of seventeen when he was selected for the Kerry minor team in 1941. He enjoyed one championship season with the minor team, however, he ended the year as All-Ireland runner-up. He made his senior debut in a tournament game in 1943. Over the course of the next twelve seasons, he won two All-Ireland medals in 1946 and 1953. He also won eight Munster medals. After being dropped from the Kerry team prior to the 1954 All-Ireland final, he played his last game for Kerry later that year in a tournament.

After being chosen on the Munster inter-provincial team for the first time in 1945, Lyne was an automatic choice on the starting fifteen for much of the next decade. During that time he won three Railway Cup medals.

In retirement from playing, Lyne continued his association with Kerry by becoming involved in team management and coaching. He was a selector with the Kerry senior team that claimed All-Ireland honours in 1955. Over a decade later Lyne returned to the senior team as trainer. In his four seasons in charge he guided the team to two successive All-Ireland Championships, three successive Munster Championships and two National Leagues.

== Honours ==
=== Player ===
University College Cork

- Sigerson Cup (1): 1944

Killarney Legion

- Kerry Senior Football Championship (1): 1946

Kerry

- All-Ireland Senior Football Championship (2): 1946, 1953
- Munster Senior Football Championship (8): 1944, 1946, 1947, 1948, 1950, 1951, 1953, 1954
- Munster Minor Football Championship (1): 1941

Munster

- Railway Cup (3): 1946, 1948, 1949

=== Selector ===
Kerry

- All-Ireland Senior Football Championship (1): 1955
- Munster Senior Football Championship (1): 1955

=== Trainer ===
Kerry

- All-Ireland Senior Football Championship (2): 1969, 1970
- Munster Senior Football Championship (3): 1968, 1969, 1970
- National Football League (2): 1968-69, 1970-71

Sporting positions
Preceded by Jim Brosnan	Kerry Senior Football Trainer; 1968-1971	Succeeded by Joe Keohane
