= Mick Fleming (Gaelic footballer) =

Irish Gaelic football player (born 1943)

Personal information
- Native name: Mícheál Pléimeann (Irish)
- Born: 1943 (age 82–83) Currow, County Kerry, Ireland
- Height: 6 ft 1 in (185 cm)

Sport
- Sport: Gaelic football
- Position: Midfield
Clubs
- Years: Club
- Currow; University College Cork; Castleisland; St Finbarr's; Bishopstown
Club titles
- Cork titles: 2
Inter-county
Years	County	Apps (scores)
1963-1970	Kerry	20 (1-06)
Inter-county titles
- Munster titles: 5
- All-Irelands: 1
- NFL: 2

Michael Fleming (born 1943) is an Irish former Gaelic footballer. He played at club level with a number of clubs in Kerry and Cork and at senior level with the Kerry county team.

== Honours ==
University College Cork

- Cork Senior Football Championship: 1963, 1964

St Finbarr's

- Cork Intermediate Football Championship: 1970

Kerry

- All-Ireland Senior Football Championship: 1969
- Munster Senior Football Championship: 1964, 1965, 1968, 1969, 1970
- National Football League: 1962-63, 1968-69
- Munster Under-21 Football Championship: 1962
