= Mick Morris (Gaelic footballer) =

Irish Gaelic footballer (born 1943)

Personal information
- Native name: Mícheál Mac Muiris (Irish)
- Born: 1943 (age 82–83) Tralee, County Kerry
- Occupation: Sportsperson
- Height: 5 ft 11 in (180 cm)

Sport
- Sport: Gaelic football
- Position: Centre-back
Club
- Years: Club
- 1960s-1970s: John Mitchels
Club titles
- Kerry titles: 6
Inter-county
Years	County	Apps (scores)
1964-1969	Kerry	16
Inter-county titles
- Munster titles: 3
- All-Irelands: 1
- NFL: 1
- All Stars: 0

Mick Morris (born 1943) is an Irish former Gaelic footballer and golfer. He played for his local club John Mitchels and was a member of the Kerry senior inter-county team from 1964 until 1969. He went on to represent Ireland in golf, winning the Irish Close Championship in 1978 and the South of Ireland Championship in 1982. He also won the Irish Seniors Amateur Open Championship in 2004.

== Club ==
Morris played with John Mitchels club during a golden era for the Tralee side. He was part of the side that won five Kerry Senior Football Championship titles in a row between 1959-63. He won another title in 1966. He was also part of the side that won the 1961 Kerry Minor Football Championship.

== Third Level ==
During his college days Morris lined out with University College Cork. He had much success in the Sigerson Cup. He won titles with the Cork college in 1965, 1966 and 1969. He was later shortlisted for the Sigerson Team of the Century in 2010.

He also had success in the Cork Senior Football Championship. He won titles in 1964 and 1969.

== Under 21 ==
Morris first played with Kerry at Under 21 level.

His first appearance was during the 1962 Munster championship. His only appearance was a semi-final win over Clare.

He was underage again in 1963 and lined out in the Munster final. However he was on the losing side to Cork.

In 1964 he was again underage. After little success in the previous two seasons this season would be different. He picked up a Munster title after a 0-15 to 1-02 win over Tipperary in the final. An All-Ireland semi-final win over Galway seen Kerry into an All-Ireland final. In the final Kerry faced Laois. At full time a 1-10 to 1-03 win seen Morris pick up an All-Ireland Under 21 title.

== Junior ==
On the back of his Under 21 displays Morris joined the Kerry Junior team. He sole season was in 1963 but it was to be a successful one.

Wins over Clare, Cork and Limerick seen him pick up a Munster Junior Football Championship title. An All-Ireland semi-final win over Antrim seen Kerry into the Home All-Ireland final. In the final Morris and co faced Wexford. A 1-13 to 2-07 win seen Kerry into the All-Ireland final. They faced Lancashire in the final in Manchester. A 3-05 to 2-05 win seen Morris pick up an All-Ireland Junior Football Championship title. He won the title alongside five of his John Mitchels teammates.

== Senior ==
On the back of his Under 21 and Junior displays Morris soon joined the Kerry Senior team.

He first joined the team during the 1964 All-Ireland Senior Football Championship. Wins over Tipperary and Cork seen him pick up his first Munster Senior Football Championship title. A 2-12 to 0-06 win over Cavan in the All-Ireland semi-final seen Kerry into the final. Morris lined out in his first senior final with Galway being the opponents. At full time Morris and co were on the wrong end of a 0-15 to 0-10 scoreline.

In 1965 wins over Limerick and Clare seen Morris pick up his second Munster title. An All-Ireland semi-final win over Dublin seen Kerry into the All-Ireland final for the second season in a row. Morris was again at Corner Back as Kerry again faced Galway. He was again on the losing side however this time on a 0-12 to 0-09.

The next few seasons proved to be unsuccessful as Kerry lost to Cork in Munster finals in 1966 and 1967 Morris was the captain for the latter loss.

He missed out on Kerry's Munster win in 1968. He was a surprise starter from the subsequent All-Ireland final. In his third appearance in a final he was on the losing side once more. this time to Down.

Having little success in the League Morris had a very successful 1968–69 National Football League. Kerry made it to the Home final where they overcame Offaly. In the final Kerry faced New York. The sides ended level 0-12 each. In the replay Morris picked up his first, and only, League medal after a 2-21 to 2-12 win in New York.

Come championship time wins over Waterford and Cork seen Morris pick up his third Munster title. He missed out on the All-Ireland semi-final win over Mayo. He was back in the team for the All-Ireland final with Offaly. Lining out in his fourth All-Ireland final, and having been on the losing side in the previous three, he finally got his hands on an All-Ireland medal after a 0-10 to 0-07 win.

Coming into 1970 Morris was 26 years old and coming into his prime. He played in seven games during the 1969–70 National Football League.

Having won the 1969 All-Ireland Kerry went on a tour of Australia. However after returning Morris had a despite relating to unpaid expenses and as a result Morris walked away and never again played with Kerry.

== Golf ==
Having finished GAA career at a young age, Morris became an amateur golfer and is considered by some to be amongst Ireland's all-time top 100 amateur golfers.

Having moved to Dublin to work with the ESB he joined Portmarnock Golf Club. He would go on to win the Irish Close in 1978 and the South of Ireland Amateur Open Championship in 1982. He appeared in 4 South of Ireland Finals (1977,80,82 & 84). He finished runner up in the East of Ireland Championship in 1975. He played 51 times for Ireland between 1978 and 1984.

Morris also won the Irish Seniors in 2004, a testament to his sporting talent over five decades.

Sporting positions
Preceded by Donie O'Sullivan	Kerry Senior Football Captain; 1967	Succeeded by Pat Griffin
