= Tom Scully (football manager) =

Gaelic football manager (1930–2020)

Personal information
- Nickname: Fr Tom
- Born: May 1930
- Died: 7 April 2020 (aged 89) St James's Hospital, Dublin, Ireland
- Occupations: Priest, schoolteacher

Sport
- Sport: Gaelic football
Inter-county management
- Years: Team
- 1969: Offaly

Thomas Scully OMI (c. May 1930 – 7 April 2020) was a Gaelic football manager, priest and schoolteacher. He managed the Offaly county team, where he was pivotal in establishing them as a rising side in the sport.

== Biography ==
Scully was a native of Aharney in Tullamore. He had two brothers and six sisters: Ned, Michael, Nance (Hanlon), Mary (Garry), Rose (Cleary), Margaret (Henry), Lily (Elizabeth McDonnell) and Emily (Hanlon). All bar Emily predeceased him. He studied philosophy at UCD and theology at the Oblates Scholasticate in Piltown County Kilkenny.

During the 1960s, Scully trained the Belcamp College boarding school team in Dublin to three Leinster Schools' Football Championships. He led Offaly to the final of the 1968–69 National Football League (their first), the Leinster Senior Football Championship title (their third) and then to the 1969 All-Ireland Senior Football Championship Final (their first since 1961), having only taken over that year (though he would have trained any Offaly players living in Dublin).

Scully departed for South Africa in 1970 to teach mathematics in Johannesburg. However, apartheid did not suit him and he moved to England instead. While in England he lived in both London and Manchester. He there became involved in the Lancashire GAA. By 1988, Scully had become Director of the Irish Centre in London. He established a day centre for the elderly and encouraged the older Irish to mix with the older English and the older Europeans living there. In May that year, RTÉ's reporter Leo Enright was in Camden Town and Scully spoke to him on camera. He was selected as Offaly Person of the Year in 1989.

=== Later life ===
By 2018, Scully's eyesight had deteriorated. Based in later life in the House of Retreat in the Dublin suburb of Inchicore, Scully heard confessions and ministered to the sick. He died in Dublin of COVID-19 on the morning of 7 April. He was one month short of his 90th birthday. His death occurred at St James's Hospital. He had been in hospital for less than a week and had spoken over the phone during those final days.
