= Donal Kavanagh =

Irish Gaelic footballer

Personal information
- Native name: Dónall Caomhánach (Irish)
- Born: 1950 (age 75–76) Killarney, County Kerry
- Height: 5 ft 11 in (180 cm)

Sport
- Sport: Gaelic football
- Position: Centre-forward
Club
- Years: Club
- 1960s-1980s: Dr. Crokes
Inter-county
Years	County	Apps (scores)
1972-1973	Kerry	8 (3-01)
Inter-county titles
- Munster titles: 1
- All-Irelands: 0
- NFL: 2
- All Stars: 0

Donal Kavanagh (born 1950 in Killarney, County Kerry) is an Irish former sportsperson. He played Gaelic football with his local club Dr. Crokes and was a member of the Kerry senior inter-county team from 1972 until 1973.
