= 1970 All-Ireland Senior Football Championship =

Football championship

Championship details
- Dates: 10 May – 27 September 1970
- Teams: 31

All-Ireland Champions
- Winning team: Kerry (22nd win)
- Captain: Donie O'Sullivan
- Manager: Jackie Lyne

All-Ireland Finalists
- Losing team: Meath
- Captain: Jack Quinn

Provincial Champions
- Munster: Kerry
- Leinster: Meath
- Ulster: Derry
- Connacht: Galway

Championship statistics
- No. matches played: 31
- Goals total: 91 (2.9 per game)
- Points total: 654 (21.0 per game)
- Top Scorer: Tony Brennan (0–33)
- Player of the Year: Tom Prendergast

The 1970 All-Ireland Senior Football Championship was the 84th staging of the All-Ireland Senior Football Championship, the Gaelic Athletic Association's premier inter-county Gaelic football tournament. The championship began on 10 May 1970 and ended on 27 September 1970.

Kerry entered the championship as the defending champions.

On 27 September 1970, Kerry won the championship following a 2–19 to 0–18 defeat of Meath in the All-Ireland final. This was their 22nd All-Ireland title, their second in succession.

Meath's Tony Brennan was the championship's top scorer with 0–33. Kerry's Tom Prendergast was the choice for Texaco Footballer of the Year.

== Rule change ==
As a result of a decision taken at the Gaelic Athletic Association's (GAA) annual congress the previous year, as of 1970 all provincial finals, All-Ireland semi-finals and the All-Ireland final itself were extended to 80 minutes playing time. Prior to this all championship matches were sixty minutes in duration. Lasted until 1974.

== Leinster Championship format change ==
The Second Round dropped from the Leinster football championship this year.

== Results ==
=== Connacht Senior Football Championship ===
Quarter-final

7 June 1970 Quarter-final	Leitrim	1–7 – 4–14	Roscommon	Páirc Seán Mac Diarmada, Carrick-on-Shannon
	P Dolan 1–1, D Gannon 0–1, F O'Carroll 0–1.		M Frayne 2–4, D Earley 2–0, M Flanagan 1–2, M Farron 0–3, J Cox 0–2, W O'Hara 0–1, MJ Keane 0–1.	Referee: M Loftus (Mayo)

Semi-finals

21 June 1970 Semi-final	Roscommon	2–10 – 1–9	Mayo	Tuam Stadium, Tuam
	M Freyne 0–5, W O'Hara 1–1, M Flanagan 1–0, D Earley 0–2, J Cox 0–1, M Fallon 0–1.		J Corcoran 0–6, J Gibbons 1–0, D Griffith 0–1, W McGee 0–1, S O'Dowd 0–1.	Referee: S McLoughlin (Galway)

28 June 1970 Semi-final	Galway	1–8 – 0–7	Sligo	Fr. O'Hara Park, Charlestown
	J Keenan 0–7, C Dunne 1–1.		M Kearins 0–5, M Marron 0–1, D Connolly 0–1.	Referee: M Connaughton (Mayo)

Final

12 July 1970 Final	Galway	2–15 – 1–8	Roscommon	Pearse Stadium, Galway
	J Keenan 0–7, J McLoughlin 2–0, L Sammon 0–4, C Dunne 0–3, P Donnellan 0–1.		M Flanagan 1–2, D Earley 0–2, M Fallon 0–1, G Kelly 0–1, B O'Hara 0–1, A O'Sullivan 0–1.	Attendance: 11,500; Referee: M Loftus (Mayo)

=== Leinster Senior Football Championship ===
First round

10 May 1970 First round	Westmeath	1–12 – 1–9	Laois	O'Connor Park, Tullamore
	F Connaughton 1–2, T Dolan 0–3, P Buckley 0–3, D Murtagh 0–2, M Carley 0–1, N Daly 0–1.		TJ Bradley 1–7, K Brennan 0–1, D Millar 0–1.	Referee: P Kelly (Dublin)

17 May 1970 First round	Longford	2–14 – 3–8	Dublin	Cusack Park, Mullingar
	J Hanniffy 0–8, M Hopkins 1–2, M Kenny 1–1, T Mulvihill 0–2, S Lee 0–1.		D Hickey 2–1, T O'Hanlon 1–0, J Keaveney 0–3, T Hanahoe 0–1, S O'Connor 0–1, F Murray 0–1, J Reilly 0–1.	Referee: R Barry (Meath)

17 May 1970 First round	Kildare	5–8 – 1–8	Wicklow	Dr. Cullen Park, Carlow
	P Dunny 2–0, J Donnelly 0–5, T Fitzgerald 1–1, M Mullins 1–0, P Mangan 1–0, B Geraghty 0–1, E Donoghue 0–1.		M O'Toole 0–4, N Carty 1–0, P Clarke 0–2, M Coffey 0–1, J McDonald 0–1.	Referee: J Lennon (Louth)

Quarter-finals

7 June 1970 Quarter-final	Longford	1–12 – 1–9	Louth	Croke Park, Dublin
	J Hanniffy 0–5, S Lee 1–0, M Hopkins 0–2, H Mulvihill 0–2, Pat Burke 0–1, M Kenny 0–1, S Mulvihill 0–1.		E Sheelin 1–0, B Gaughran 0–6, J Judge 0–1, M McKeown 0–1, H McCarthy 0–1.

7 June 1970 Quarter-final	Kildare	3–10 – 1–11	Wexford	Croke Park, Dublin
	P Dunny 1–4, Mullins 1–3, T Fitzgerald 1–1, J Boyne 0–1, E O'Donoghue 0–1.		Jack Berry 0–5, S Sheridan 1–1, J Shaughnessy 0–2, A Merrigan 0–1, M Quigley 0–1, D Asple 0–1.

14 June 1970 Quarter-final	Offaly	2–12 – 1–10	Westmeath	Páirc Tailteann, Navan
	T McTague 1–6, W Bryan 1–2, J Cooney 0–2, P Fanning 0–1, S Kilroy 0–1.		F Connaughton 1–1, P Buckley 0–3, M Carley 0–2, P Bradley 0–2, M Murphy 0–1, AN Other 0–1.	Referee: P Roberts

21 June 1970 Quarter-final	Meath	1–17 – 1–4	Carlow	St. Conleth's Park, Newbridge
	T Brennan 0–6, K Rennicks 1–2, M Kerrigan 0–3, O Shanley 0–2, J Murphy 0–2, M Fay 0–1, V Lynch 0–1.		B French 1–0, W O'Brien 0–3, S King 0–1.	Referee: P Kelly (Dublin)

Semi-finals

28 June 1970 Semi-final	Longford	1–9 – 0–12	Offaly	Croke Park, Dublin
	J Hanniffy 1–5, M Hopkins 0–3, S Lee 0–1.		T McTague 0–8, J Cooney 0–2, S Evans 0–1, J Gunning 0–1.	Attendance: 22217; Referee: B Louth (Dublin)

5 July 1970 Semi-final replay	Offaly	1–13 – 1–8	Longford	Croke Park, Dublin
	T McTague 0–9, E Evans 1–0, S Kilroy 0–1, P Fenning 0–1, J Cooney 0–1, W Bryan 0–1.		J Devine 1–6, S Lee 0–1, M Hopkins 0–1.	Referee: M Meally (Kilkenny)

5 July 1970 Semi-final	Kildare	1–8 – 0–13	Meath	Croke Park, Dublin
	J Donnelly 1–4, P Deasy 0–2, T Carew 0–1, M Mullins 0–1.		T Brennan 0–5, M Kerrigan 0–3, K Rennicks 0–2, J Murphy 0–1, V Lynch 0–1, M Mellett 0–1.

Final

19 July 1970 Final	Meath	2–22 – 5–12	Offaly	Croke Park, Dublin
	T Brennan 0–10, M Fay 2–0, M Kerrigan 0–3, M Mellet 0–2, K Rennicks 0–2, J Murphy 0–2, O Shanley 0–2, V Lynch 0–1.		M O'Connor 2–3, K Claffey 1–2, W Bryan 1–1, T McTague 0–4, J Cooney 1–0, P Keenan 0–1, P Fenning 0–1.	Attendance: 32085; Referee: B Hayden (Carlow)

=== Munster Senior Football Championship ===
Quarter-finals

10 May 1970 Quarter-final	Waterford	0–5 – 1–3	Limerick	Fraher Field, Dungarvan
	B Kirwan 0–2, P Walsh 0–1, T Walsh 0–1, M Coffey 0–1.		M Graham 1–0, M Tynan 0–3,	Referee: P Verdon (Tipperary)

10 May 1970 Quarter-final	Tipperary	2–12 – 1–7	Clare	Gaelic Grounds, Limerick
				Referee: N. Dalton (Waterford)

Semi-finals

5 July 1970 Semi-final	Limerick	2–5 – 2–19	Kerry	Páirc na nGael, Askeaton
	S Burke 1–1, P Murphy 1–0, É Cregan 0–3, K Renninson 0–1.		M Gleeson 2–0, B Lynch 0–6, M O'Dwyer 0–4, P Griffin 0–3, E O'Donoghue 0–3, L Higgins 0–2, M O'Connell 0–1.	Referee: J Dennigan (Cork)

5 July 1970 Semi-final	Tipperary	3–9 – 2–15	Cork	Ned Hall Park, Clonmel
	M Keating 3–1, P Blythe 0–4, C Flaherty 0–1, P Dawson 0–1, S Kearney 0–1, P O'Connor 0–1.		D Coughlan 1–10, T Holland 1–0, N Kirby 0–3, R Cummins 0–2.	Referee: N Dalton (Waterford)

Final

26 July 1970 Final	Kerry	2–22 – 2–9	Cork	Fitzgerald Stadium, Killarney
	M O'Dwyer 0–8, M O'Connell 0–5, P Griffin 1–1, L Higgins 1–1, B Lynch 0–4, DJ Crowley 0–3.		D Coughlan 2–4, B O'Neill 0–2, D Long 0–1, D Hunt 0–1, R Cummins 0–1.	Referee: J Moloney (Tipperary)

=== Ulster Senior Football Championship ===
Preliminary round

7 June 1970 Preliminary round	Donegal	2–6 – 3–8	Antrim	MacCumhaill Park, Ballybofey
	H McClafferty 1–2, M Griffin 1–1, S Ferriter 0–2, B McEniff 0–1.		A McCallin 2–2, T Dunlop 1–0, L Boyle 0–2, A Hamill 0–2, G Dillon 0–1, J Ward 0–1.

Quarter-finals

7 June 1970 Quarter-final	Cavan	3–13 – 1–3	Fermanagh	Breffni Park, Cavan
	G Cusack 1–5, T O'Reilly 1–2, H McInerney 1–1, O Leddy 0–2, M Galligan 0–1, S Duggan 0–1, R Carolan 0–1.		E McPartland 1–1, S Gunn 0–1, G Magee 0–1.	Referee: G Griffin (Donegal)

7 June 1970 Quarter-final	Derry	3–12 – 0–7	Tyrone	Dean McGlinchey Park, Ballinascreen
	S O'Connell 1–3, S Lagan 1–2, H Niblock 1–0, K Teague 0–3, E Coleman 0–1, A McGurk 0–1, B Devlin 0–1, A McGuckan 0–1.		PJ Hughes 0–4, P Parke 0–1, S Donaghy 0–1, K Teague 0–1.	Referee: L Maguire (Monaghan)

14 June 1970 Quarter-final	Monaghan	3–7 – 1–7	Armagh	St. Mary's Park, Castleblayney
	E Tavey 2–0, T Mahon 1–2, S Woods 0–2, F Ward 0–1, D McCabe 0–1, B McDonnell 0–1.		M Murphy 1–0, P Loughran 0–3, S Lavelle 0–1, P McCann 0–1, J Smith 0–1, J Daly 0–1.	Referee: P Greene (Antrim)

21 June 1970 Quarter-final	Antrim	2–9 – 1–6	Down	Casement Park, Belfast
	A McCallin 1–4, T Dunlop 1–0, A Hamill 0–2, G McCann 0–2, L Boyle 0–1.		J Morgan 0–4, M Cole 1–0, D Davey 0–1, J Lennon 0–1.

Semi-finals

28 June 1970 Semi-final	Cavan	1–5 – 1–8	Derry	St. Molaise Park, Irvinestown
	H McInenrey 1–1, J Duggan 0–2, D Coyle 0–1, G Cosack 0–1.		B Devlin 1–2, S O'Connell 0–3, M Niblock 0–1, E Coleman 0–1, A McGuckan 0–1.

5 July 1970 Semi-final	Antrim	2–10 – 1–8	Monaghan	Páirc Esler, Newry
	A Hamill 2–0, O Ruddy 0–4, G McCann 0–2, A McCallin 0–2, D McNeill 0–1, B Millar 0–1.		S Woods 0–6, B McDonald 1–0, G Fitzpatrick 0–1.

Final

26 July 1970 Final	Derry	2–13 – 1–12	Antrim	St. Tiernach's Park, Clones
	S O'Connell 1–4, B Devlin 0–5, S Lagan 1–0, M Niblock 0–2, J Gribben 0–1, E Coleman 0–1.		A McCallin 0–7, F Fitzsimmons 1–0, G McCrory 0–3, O Ruddy 0–1, A Hamill 0–1.	Referee: L Maguire (Monaghan)

=== All-Ireland Senior Football Championship ===
Semi-finals

9 August 1970 Semi-final	Galway	0–11 – 0–15	Meath	Croke Park, Dublin
	J Keenan 0–5, T Keenan 0–3, C Dunne 0–2, F Canavan 0–1.		T Brennan 0–7, M Kerrigan 0–3, M Fay 0–3, K Rennicks 0–2.	Referee: J Moloney (Tipperary)

23 August 1970 Semi-final	Kerry	0–23 – 0–10	Derry	Croke Park, Dublin
	M O'Dwyer 0–9, P Griffin 0–5, B Lynch 0–4, L Higgins 0–2, J O'Keeffe 0–1, M O'Connell 0–1, DJ Crowley 0–1.		S O'Connell 0–5, S Lagan 0–2, T Quinn 0–1, H Niblock 0–1, T McGuinness 0–1.	Referee: P Kelly (Dublin)

Final

27 September 1970 Final	Kerry	2–19 – 0–18	Meath	Croke Park, Dublin
	B Lynch 0–5, M O'Dwyer 0–5, M Gleeson 1–1, DJ Crowley 1–0, P Griffin 0–2, E O'Donoghue 0–2, M O'Connell 0–2, L Higgins 0–2.		M Fay 0–10, T Brennan 0–5, K Rennicks 0–2, V Lynch 0–1.	Attendance: 71,775; Referee: P Kelly (Dublin)

== Championship statistics ==
=== Miscellaneous ===
- On 12 July 1970, the Connacht final between Galway and Roscommon becomes the first championship game to be played over the course of 80 minutes.
- Kerry win their 5th 2 in a row as All Ireland Champions.

=== Top scorers ===
Overall

Rank	Player	County	Tally	Total	Matches	Average
1	Tony Brennan	Meath	0–33	33	5	6.60
2	Tony McTague	Offaly	1–27	30	4	7.50
3	Mick O'Dwyer	Kerry	0–26	26	4	6.50
4	Andy McCallin	Antrim	3–15	24	4	6.00
5	Denis Coughlan	Cork	3–14	23	2	11.50
6	Jim Hanniffy	Longford	1–18	21	3	7.0
6	Seán O'Connell	Derry	2–15	21	4	5.25
8	Mickey Fay	Meath	2–14	20	5	4.0
9	John Keenan	Galway	0–19	19	3	6.33
9	Brendan Lynch	Kerry	0–19	19	4	4.75

Single game

Rank	Player	County	Tally	Total	Opposition
1	Denis Coughlan	Cork	1–10	13	Tipperary
2	Michael "Babs" Keating	Tipperary	3–1	10	Cork
2	Mickey Freyne	Roscommon	2–4	10	Leitrim
2	Denis Coughlan	Cork	2–4	10	Kerry
2	Tom Joe Bradley	Laois	1–7	10	Westmeath
2	Tony Brennan	Meath	0–10	10	Offaly
2	Mickey Fay	Meath	0–10	10	Kerry
8	Murt Connor	Offaly	2–3	9	Meath
8	Tony McTague	Offaly	1–6	9	Westmeath
8	Jackie Devine	Longford	1–6	9	Offaly
8	Tony McTague	Offaly	0–9	9	Longford
8	Mick O'Dwyer	Kerry	0–9	9	Derry
