= 1973–74 National Football League (Ireland) =

Gaelic football competition

League details
- Dates: October 1973 – 12 May 1974

League champions
- Winners: Kerry (12th win)
- Captain: Paudie O'Donoghue
- Manager: Johnny Culloty

League runners-up
- Runners-up: Roscommon

The 1973–74 National Football League was the 43rd staging of the National Football League (NFL), an annual Gaelic football tournament for the Gaelic Athletic Association county teams of Ireland.

Kerry beat Roscommon in the final to complete a four-in-a-row.

== Format ==
Round-robin format.

== Division One ==
=== Tables ===
==== Group A ====
Team	Pld	W	D	L	F	A	Aver	Pts	Status
Kerry	7	5	1	1	131	75	1.747	11	Qualify for Knockout stage
Roscommon	7	4	2	1	95	70	1.357	10	Qualify for Knockout stage
Offaly	7	4	1	2	101	62	1.629	9
Galway	7	4	1	2	103	73	1.411	9
Cork	7	4	1	2	98	82	1.195	9
Wicklow	6	2	1	4	72	116	0.621	5
Longford	6	1	1	5	61	120	0.508	3	Relegated to Division Two of the 1974–75 NFL
Tipperary	7	0	0	7	55	118	0.466	0	Relegated to Division Three of the 1974–75 NFL

==== Group B ====
Team	Pld	W	D	L	F	A	Aver	Pts	Status
Sligo	7	6	1	0	95	60	1.583	13	Qualify for Knockout stage
Tyrone	7	4	2	1	87	65	1.338	10	Qualify for Knockout stage
Derry	7	4	0	3	81	63	1.286	8
Mayo	7	3	1	3	87	88	0.989	7
Down	7	3	0	4	69	71	0.972	6	Relegated to Division Two of the 1974–75 NFL
Fermanagh	7	3	0	4	64	75	0.853	6	Relegated to Division Two of the 1974–75 NFL
Cavan	7	2	0	5	64	83	0.771	4	Relegated to Division Two of the 1974–75 NFL
Westmeath	7	1	0	6	60	102	0.588	2	Relegated to Division Three of the 1974–75 NFL

== Division two ==
=== Tables ===
==== Group A ====
Team	Pld	W	D	L	F	A	Aver	Pts	Status
Dublin	7	6	0	1	121	63	1.747	12	Qualify for Knockout Stage; Promoted to Division One of the 1975–75 NFL
Kildare	7	5	1	1	125	65	1.923	11	Qualify for Knockout Stage; Promoted to Division One of the 1975–75 NFL
Waterford	7	5	0	2	121	77	1.571	10	Move to Division Three of the 1974–75 NFL
Clare	7	4	1	2	97	82	1.183	9	Move to Division Three of the 1974–75 NFL
Wexford	7	3	0	4	78	94	0.830	6	Move to Division Three of the 1974–75 NFL
Limerick	6	2	0	5	79	106	0.745	4	Move to Division Three of the 1974–75 NFL
Carlow	6	2	0	5	94	116	0.810	4	Move to Division Three of the 1974–75 NFL
Kilkenny	7	0	0	7	44	156	0.282	0	Move to Division Three of the 1974–75 NFL

==== Group B ====
Team	Pld	W	D	L	F	A	Aver	Pts	Status
Antrim	7	6	0	1	98	63	1.556	12	Qualify for Knockout Stage; Promoted to Division One of the 1975–75 NFL
Meath	7	5	1	1	117	63	1.857	11	Qualify for Knockout Stage; Promoted to Division One of the 1975–75 NFL
Donegal	7	4	2	1	105	76	1.382	10	Move to Division Three of the 1974–75 NFL
Laois	7	4	2	1	98	85	1.153	10	Move to Division Three of the 1974–75 NFL
Louth	7	2	2	3	98	91	1.077	6	Move to Division Three of the 1974–75 NFL
Monaghan	7	1	1	5	66	123	0.537	3	Move to Division Three of the 1974–75 NFL
Leitrim	7	1	1	5	50	96	0.521	3	Move to Division Three of the 1974–75 NFL
Armagh	7	0	1	6	66	101	0.653	1	Move to Division Three of the 1974–75 NFL

== Knockout stages ==
=== Division One ===
7 April 1974 Semi-final	Kerry	2-14 — 0-12	Tyrone	Croke Park, Dublin

28 April 1974 Semi-final	Roscommon	0-12 — 0-12	Sligo	Croke Park, Dublin

5 May 1974 Semi-final Replay	Roscommon	0-16 — 0-10	Sligo	McHale Park, Castlebar

12 May 1974 Final	Kerry	1-6 — 0-9	Roscommon	Croke Park, Dublin

26 May 1974 Final replay	Kerry	0-14 — 0-8	Roscommon	Croke Park, Dublin

=== Division two ===
21 April 1974 Semi-final	Kildare	3-15 — 3-8	Meath	Croke Park, Dublin

21 April 1974 Semi-final	Dublin	1-13 — 1-8	Antrim	Croke Park, Dublin

5 May 1974 Final	Kildare	3-13 — 2-9	Dublin	Croke Park, Dublin
