= Seán Evans =

Offaly Gaelic footballer

Personal information
- Native name: Seán Ó hÉimhín (Irish)
- Born: 1948 (age 77–78) Edenderry, County Offaly
- Height: 5 ft 11 in (180 cm)

Sport
- Sport: Gaelic football
- Position: Full-forward
Club
- Years: Club
- 1960s–1980s: Ballyfore
Inter-county
Years	County	Apps (scores)
1966–1975	Offaly	33
Inter-county titles
- Leinster titles: 4
- All-Irelands: 2
- NFL: 0
- All Stars: 0

Seán Evans (born 1948) is an Irish former sportsman. He played Gaelic football with his local club Ballyfore and was a member of the Offaly senior county team from 1966 until 1975.

Born in Edenderry, County Offaly, Evans won All-Ireland SFC titles in 1971 and 1972. In 2022, he was inducted to the Offaly hall of fame.

His son Mark is a present-day player for Seán's club Ballyfore.
