= John O'Keeffe (Gaelic footballer) =

Irish hurler and Gaelic footballer

Personal information
- Native name: Seán Ó Caoimh (Irish)
- Born: 15 April 1951 (age 75) Tralee, County Kerry
- Occupation: Secondary school teacher
- Height: 6 ft 0 in (183 cm)

Sport
- Sport: Gaelic football
- Position: Full-back
Club
- Years: Club
- 1960s–1980s: Austin Stack's
Club titles
- Kerry titles: 5
- Munster titles: 1
- All-Ireland Titles: 3
Inter-county
| Years | County | Apps (scores) |
| 1969–1984 | Kerry | 49 (0–07) |
Inter-county titles
- Munster titles: 12
- All-Irelands: 7
- NFL: 7
- All Stars: 5

John O'Keeffe (born 15 April 1951 in Tralee, County Kerry) is a former Irish Gaelic footballer who played for the Austin Stacks club and at senior level for the Kerry county team between 1969 and 1984. He was a highly talented midfielder, and one of the most stylish and accomplished full-backs in Gaelic football history. He later became the Irish international rules team manager.

== Personal life ==
O'Keeffe's father Frank also played for Kerry during the 1940s, playing in the famous 1947 All-Ireland Senior Football Championship final in the Polo Grounds in New York.

He taught history, S.P.H.E., and P.E. at Tralee Christian Brothers School before retiring after 40 years in 2011.

== Schools ==
He was part of the St Brendan's Killarney side that won the school's first Hogan Cup title in 1969.

== Third Level ==
O'Keeffe had much success in the Sigerson Cup with UCD in the 1970s. In all he won three titles between 1972/73 to 1974/75. In 2011 he was picked a Full Back on the Sigerson Cup Team of the Century.

== Club ==
O'Keeffe had much success at club level with Austin Stacks and UCD.

He won five Kerry Senior Football Championship titles in 1973, 1975, 1976 as captain 1979 and 1986. He would also captain the side to win the 1976 Munster Senior Club Football Championship and 1977 All-Ireland Senior Club Football Championship.

He won a Kerry Minor Hurling Championship with the club in 1967.He was captain of the side that won the Kerry Minor Football Championship in 1969.

He also had success with UCD in the Dublin Senior Football Championship. He won titles in 1973 and 1974. He also won Leinster Senior Club Football Championship titles in 1973–74 and 1974–75. He would go on to win All-Ireland Senior Club Football Championship titles with the college in 1974 and 1975.

== Minor ==
O'Keeffe lined out with Kerry at minor level for three season between 1967 and 1969. However it was an unsuccessful time at the Under 18 grade. He lined out in three Munster Minor Football Championship finals but was on the losing side to Cork in all three.

== Under 21 ==
He moved on to the Under 21 side for four seasons.

His first three between 1969 and 1971 like at minor level seen him on the losing side to Cork.

He finally got a win over Cork in 1972 when he picked up a Munster Under 21 Football Championship title. He would go on to line out in the All-Ireland Under 21 Football Championship but was on the losing side to Galway.

== Junior ==
While still a minor he joined the county Junior side in 1969. He played part in the Munster championship winning campaign, instead joining for the All-Ireland semi-final win over Derry. He lined out in the All-Ireland Junior Football Championship Home final where Kerry faced Wicklow. Despite being favorites O'Keeffe and co fell to a surprise 0-12 to 1-08 loss.

He was part of the team again in 1970 but another Munster final loss to a Cork side was his lot.

== Senior ==
He first joined the Kerry senior panel in 1969. He was a non playing member of the that years All-Ireland win.

His O'Keeffe won seven All-Ireland Senior Football Championship medals and 12 Munster Championship medals. Other honours he won include seven National Football League medals and eight Railway Cup medals between Munster and the Combined Universities.

He is among the leading recipients of GAA All Stars Awards, with five awards from 1973, 1975, 1976, 1978, and 1979. He was also named the Texaco Footballer of the Year in 1975.

O'Keeffe retired reluctantly on medical advice after the 1984 Munster Final with a serious hip complaint, having played relatively few games in the previous 18 months. He had hip replacement surgery some 20 years later. His last game for Kerry was in the full back position against Tipperary in the 1984 Munster SFC semi-final. O'Keeffe has always maintained that probably his most dangerous opponent was Dublin's Jimmy Keaveney, with whom he enjoyed several battles. His performance against Offaly's Matt Connor in the 1982 All-Ireland final was all the more remarkable considering he had little or no training preparation owing to injury. O'Keeffe is consistently named as full back in various GAA players/managers best ever team selections, particularly in the years leading up to the GAA's Centenary and beyond.

With the UCD GAA team, he won a Dublin County Championship in 1974, and the Leinster Club Championships and All-Ireland Club Championships in 1973-74 and 1974-75. He also won Sigerson Cup medals in 1973, 1974, and 1975.

In May 2020, the Irish Independent named O'Keeffe at number ten in its "Top 20 footballers in Ireland over the past 50 years".

Sporting positions
| Preceded by Paudie O'Donoghue | Kerry Senior Football Captain; 1974 | Succeeded by Mickey 'Ned' O'Sullivan |
| Preceded by Mickey 'Ned' O'Sullivan | Kerry Senior Football Captain; 1976 | Succeeded by Ger O'Keeffe |
| Preceded by | Limerick Senior Football Manager; 1990-1994 | Succeeded by Dave Quirke |
| Preceded by John Maughan | Clare Senior Football Manager; 1994-1998 | Succeeded by Tommy Curtin |
| Preceded by Brian McEniff | Ireland International Rules Team Manager; 2001-2003 | Succeeded by Pete McGrath |

Awards and achievements
| Preceded by Tony Hanahoe (St Vincent's) | All-Ireland Senior Club Football Final winning captain 1977 | Succeeded by Richie Bell (Thomond College) |
| Preceded by Jimmy Keaveney (Dublin) | Texaco Footballer of the Year; 1975 | Succeeded by Kevin Heffernan (Dublin) |
