= Brendan Lynch (Kerry Gaelic footballer) =

Irish Gaelic footballer and hurler

Personal information
- Native name: Breandán Ó Loingsigh (Irish)
- Born: 1949 (age 76–77) Beaufort, County Kerry
- Height: 5 ft 10 in (178 cm)

Sport
- Sport: Gaelic football
- Position: Right wing-forward
Club
- Years: Club
- 1960s-1980s: Beaufort
Club titles
- Kerry titles: 1
Inter-county
Years	County	Apps (scores)
1968-1976	Kerry	32 (3-87)
Inter-county titles
- Munster titles: 6
- All-Irelands: 3
- NFL: 4
- All Stars: 0

Brendan Lynch (born 1949 in Beaufort, County Kerry) is an Irish former sportsperson. He played Gaelic football with his local club Beaufort and was a member of the Kerry senior inter-county team from 1968 until 1976.

== Underage ==
He first played with Kerry at minor level as a 16 year old lining out in goal. He won a Munster Minor Football Championship medal after a 3-11 to 1-05 win over Cork in the final. Kerry later qualified for the All-Ireland final where they faced Derry. The title went North as Lynch and co lost out on a 2-08 to 2-04 scoreline. For the following two years Brendan had moved outfield to his customary half-forward berth, but the Kingdom were beaten narrowly by the Rebels in both Munster finals of 1966 and 1967.

He joined the county Under-21 team while still a minor in 1967. He won a Munster Under-21 Football Championship after a win over Clare in the final. Kerry qualified for the All-Ireland final where they faced Mayo. Kerry were beaten in the All-Ireland final after replay. He picked up a second Munster Under-21 Football Championship after another win over Clare in the final.

== Junior ==
In 1967 Lynch was also part of the Kerry Junior team. He won a Munster Junior Football Championship after a win over Cork. He later won a All-Ireland Junior Football Championship after a win over London in the final.

== Senior ==
Lynch joined the Kerry senior during the 1967–68 National Football League playing in final game against Mayo.

He later joined the senior making his Munster championship debut against Tipperary scoring two points in a 0-17 to 2-07 win. This set up a Munster final in Killarney. Despite being his first senior final the big day didn't get to him as he hit four points in a 1-21 to 3-08 win. His free scoring continued with another four points in a 2-13 to 2-11 All-Ireland semi-final win over Longford. This set up an All-Ireland final with Down. Despite 1-02 from Lynch The Kingdom fell short on a 2-12 to 1-13 scoreline.

He played in all of Kerry's 1968–69 National Football League including the final win, where he scored 1-03, after a replay against New York.

Come championship he scored three points in a 1-18 to 2-07 win over Waterford. In the Munster final Kerry powered to another title on a 0-16 to 1-04 scoreline, with two points from Lynch. After two big wins in Munster the All-Ireland semi-final with Mayo was much closer. Lunch helped himself to two point in a 0-14 to 1-10 win. Lynch lined out in his second All-Ireland final in a row where they faced Offaly. It was another close game and a point from Lynch helped his side to a 0-10 to 0-07 win and an All-Ireland medal of Lynch.

Lynch was in good form during the 1970 Munster championship. He scored six points in a 2-19 to 2-05 semi-final win over Limerick. Another Munster final with Cork was up next. He scored four points in a big 2-22 to 2-09 win and a third Munster title. Kerry powered past Derry, with four points from Lynch, in the All-Ireland semi-final. In the All-Ireland final Kerry faced Meath and Lynch was again in top form. He scored six points in a 2-19 to 0-18 win in the first final to be played over the course of 80 minutes.

Kerry were back in the final of 1970–71 National Football League. They faced Mayo in the final where three points from Lynch seen him pick up his second League medal in three seasons.

Things looked good as four points from Lynch see Kerry overcome Waterford in the Munster semi-final. Kerry faced Cork in the final once more and looked set for another title. It wasn't to be as The Kingdom crash out of the championship on a 0-25 to 0-14.

For the second season in a row Kerry faced Mayo in the National Football League. A 2-11 to 2-09 win seen Lynch win his third League medal in four seasons.

In the drawn All-Ireland final of 1972 he gave possibly his best ever performance scoring 1-7 as Kerry drew with Offaly, before losing out in the replay.

At the age of 25, he was the oldest player on the famous 1975 All-Ireland winning team.
