= 1969 All-Ireland Senior Football Championship =

Football championship

Championship details
- Dates: 4 May – 28 September 1969
- Teams: 31

All-Ireland Champions
- Winning team: Kerry (21st win)
- Captain: Johnny Culloty
- Manager: Jackie Lyne

All-Ireland Finalists
- Losing team: Offaly
- Captain: Johnny Egan
- Manager: Fr. Tom Scully

Provincial Champions
- Munster: Kerry
- Leinster: Offaly
- Ulster: Cavan
- Connacht: Mayo

Championship statistics
- No. matches played: 35
- Player of the Year: Mick O'Dwyer

The 1969 All-Ireland Senior Football Championship was the 83rd staging of the All-Ireland Senior Football Championship, the Gaelic Athletic Association's premier inter-county Gaelic football tournament. The championship began on 4 May 1969 and ended on 28 September 1969.

Down entered the championship as the defending champions, however, they were defeated by Cavan in the Ulster final.

On 28 September 1969, Kerry won the championship following a 0–10 to 0–7 defeat of Offaly in the All-Ireland final. This was their 21st All-Ireland title, their first in seven championship seasons.

Kerry's Mick O'Dwyer was the choice for Texaco Footballer of the Year.

== Results ==
=== Connacht Senior Football Championship ===
Quarter-final

| 15 June 1969 Quarter-final | Sligo | 1–6 – 2–12 | Roscommon | Markievicz Park, Sligo |
| | R Hayden 1–0, M Kearins 0–3, S Davey 0–1, D Kearins 0–1, D McHugh 0–1. | | M Fallon 0–8, M O'Gara 1–1, R Creaven 1–0, D Earley 0–1, J Kelly 0–1, A O'Sullivan 0–1. |

Semi-finals

| 22 June 1969 Semi-final | Leitrim | 1–8 – 6–13 | Mayo | Páirc Seán Mac Diarmada, Carrick-on-Shannon |
| | B Wrynne 0–6, H O'Carroll 1–0, D Gannon 0–1, D O'Grady 0–1. | | J Nealon 3–0, W Magee 2–1, J Corcoran 1–2, S O'Dowd 0–4, J Langan 0–2, M McIntyre 0–2, J Morely 0–1, PJ Loftus 0–1. | Referee: P O'Connor (Roscommon) |

| 6 July 1969 Semi-final | Galway | 0–8 – 0–1 | Roscommon | Dunlo GAA Grounds, Ballinasloe |
| | J Keenan 0–5, C Dunne 0–2, M Meade 0–1. | | J Kelly 0–1. | Referee: M Loftus (Mayo) |

Finals

| 20 July 1969 Final | Galway | 1–8 – 0–11 | Mayo | Pearse Stadium, Galway |
| | J Keenan 1–3, C Dunne 0–2, L Sammon 0–2, P Donnellan 0–1. | | J Corcoran 0–6, S O'Dowd 0–2, W McGee 0–1, D Griffith 0–1, J Langan 0–1. | Attendance: 25,000; Referee: L Maguire (Cavan) |

| 3 August 1969 Final replay | Mayo | 1–11 – 1–8 | Galway | MacHale Park, Castlebar |
| | J Corcoran 0–5, J Nealon 1–1, D Griffith 0–4, S O'Dowd 0–1. | | J Keenan 0–4, L Sammon 1–0, J Duggan 0–2, T Keenan 0–2, C Dunne 0–1. | Referee: J Maloney (Tipperary) |

=== Leinster Senior Football Championship ===
First round

| 27 April 1969 First round | Carlow | 1–13 – 2–7 | Wicklow | Páirc Éanna, Gorey |
| | B Hayden 0–4, E O'Gorman 1–0, B O'Brien 0–3, B Rice 0–2, P McNally 0–2, E Walker 0–1, T Moran 0–1. | | M mcNamee 0–6, F O'Neill 1–0, G Farrell 1–0, K Melia 0–1. | Referee: S Aldridge (Kildare) |

Second round

| 11 May 1969 Second round | Wexford | 2–7 – 1–10 | Carlow | Nowlan Park, Kilkenny |
| | | | | Referee: L Shannon (Dublin) |

| 1 June 1969 Second round | Westmeath | 1–7 – 1–6 | Louth | Croke Park, Dublin |
| | P Buckley 0–5, T Dolan 1–1, P Bradley 0–1. | | J Judge 1–3, M McKeown 0–2, L Leech 0–1. | Attendance: 10,292; Referee: L McCormack |

| 1 June 1969 Second round replay | Wexford | 2–9 – 2–7 | Carlow | Croke Park, Dublin |
| | S Sheridan 2–2, J Berry 0–6, D Asple 0–1. | | B Hayden 1–2, E Walker 1–1, J King 0–4. | Referee: P Ó hAodha (Louth) |

Quarter-finals

| 4 May 1969 Quarter-final | Dublin | 3–7 – 1–5 | Laois | Dr Cullen Park, Carlow |
| | D Foley 1–2, S Foley 1–1, P Delaney 0–4, L Deegan 1–0. | | H Mulhare 1–3, J Lawlor 0–1, B Lawlor 0–1. | Attendance: 10,000; Referee: B Hayden (Carlow) |

| 25 May 1969 Quarter-final | Kildare | 2–16 – 1–11 | Meath | Croke Park, Dublin |
| | J Donnelly 0–8, M Mullins 2–0, P Dunny 0–4, K Kelly 0–1, J Doyle 0–1, P Connolly 0–1, J Dalton 0–1. | | T Brennan 1–6, B Cunningham 0–2, T O'Dowd 0–1, M Mellitt 0–1, T Kearns 0–1. | Attendance: 18,033; Referee: P Kelly (Dublin) |

| 8 June 1969 Quarter-final | Wexford | 3–5 – 1–8 | Longford | Croke Park, Dublin |
| | J Berry 2–1, J Sheridan 1–2, W Howlin 0–1, P Cleere 0–1. | | L Devine 1–0, J Hanniffy 0–5, M Hopkins 0–1, P Burke 0–1, T Mulvihill 0–1. |

| 29 June 1969 Quarter-final | Offaly | 3–14 – 1–8 | Westmeath | Croke Park, Dublin |
| | T McTague 0–10, S Evans 1–1, S Kilroy 1–1, S Cooney 1–1, W Bryan 0–1. | | Tommy Dolan 1–1, P Buckley 0–4, G Kane 0–1, D Murtagh 0–1, D Dolan 0–1. | Referee: P Hughes (Louth) |

Semi-finals

| 15 June 1969 Semi-final | Kildare | 0–18 – 0–7 | Dublin | Dr. Cullen Park, Carlow |
| | J Donnelly 0–7, P Dunny 0–3, M Mullins 0–2, J Doylke 0–2, P Connolly 0–2, J Dalton 0–1, J Balfe 0–1. | | S O'Connor 0–2, F Delaney 0–2, M Whelan 0–1, D Foley 0–1, W Casey 0–1. | Referee: B Hayden (Carlow) |

| 13 July 1969 Semi-final | Offaly | 3–9 – 1–10 | Wexford | Croke Park, Dublin |
| | T McTague 1–4, S Kilroy 1–1, P Monaghan 1–1, W Bryan 0–1, M O'Rourke 0–1, A Hickey 0–1. | | Jack Berry 0–7, P Cleere 1–0, S Sheridan 0–2. | Referee: P Hughes (Louth) |

Final

| 27 July 1969 Final | Offaly | 3–7 – 1–8 | Kildare | Croke Park, Dublin |
| | Pat Monaghan and Pat Keenan 1–1, Mick O'Rourke 1–0, Tony McTague 0–3 (0-2f), Sean Kilroy and Kevin Kilmurray 0–1. | | Jack Donnelly 0-5f, Tommy Carew 1–1, Kevin Kelly 0–2 | Attendance: 37,567; Referee: Brendan Hayden (Carlow) |

=== Munster Senior Football Championship ===
Quarter-finals

| 4 May 1969 Quarter-final | Limerick | 1–6 – 1–10 | Clare | Gaelic Grounds, Limerick |
| | É Cregan 1–0, M Tynan 0–2, M Graham 0–2, P Doherty 0–1, M Callopy 0–1. | | M Chambers 1–1, M McInerney 0–4, W O'Donoghue 0–3, M Maloney 0–1, P McMahon 0–1. | Referee: P Halbert (Cork) |

| 18 May 1969 Quarter-final | Tipperary | 0–10 – 1–7 | Waterford | Ned Hall Park, Clonmel |
| | J Cummins 0–5, M Keating 0–3, B O'Callaghan 0–2. | | G Mooney 1–0, V Kirwan 0–3, T O'Riordan 0–2, T Walsh 0–2. | Referee: S O'Connor (Limerick) |

| 8 June 1969 Quarter-final replay | Waterford | 0–15 – 0–10 | Tipperary | Fraher Field, Dungarvan |
| | V Kirwan 0–5, T Riordan 0–3, T Walsh 0–3, T Cunningham 0–2, P Walsh 0–2, M Power 0–1. | | J Cummins 0–7, P O'Connell 0–1, P Blythe 0–1, M Egan 0–1. | Referee: S O'Connor (Limerick) |

Semi-finals

| 25 May 1969 Semi-final | Cork | 2–4 – 0–5 | Clare | Cork Athletic Grounds, Cork |
| | D Coughlan 1–1, E Philpott 1–1, B O'Neill 0–1, TF Hayes 0–1. | | M O'Donoghue 0–2, S Griffin 0–1, M Garry 0–1, M Maloney 0–1. |

| 15 June 1969 Semi-final | Waterford | 2–7 – 1–18 | Kerry | Fraher Field, Dungarvan |
| | T Walsh 1–2, P Walsh 1–1, V Kirwan 0–4. | | P Moynihan 0–5, M Fleming 1–1, M O'Connell 0–4, M O'Dwyer 0–3, B Lynch 0–2, DJ Crowley 0–2, T Prendergast 0–1. |

Final

| 20 July 1969 Final | Cork | 1–4 – 0–16 | Kerry | Cork Athletic Grounds, Cork |
| | TF Hayes 1–1, R Cummins 0–1, D Long 0–1, B O'Neill 0–1. | | M O'Connell 0–6, M O'Dwyer 0–3, B Lynch 0–2, P Griffin 0–1, É O'Donoghue 0–1, M Gleeson 0–1, L Higgins 0–1, DJ Crowley 0–1. | Attendance: 29,985; Referee: J Maloney (Tipperary) |

=== Ulster Senior Football Championship ===
Preliminary round

| 1 June 1969 Preliminary round | Tyrone | 0–8 – 2–8 | Derry | O'Neill Park, Dungannon |
| | B Dolan 0–2, S Donaghy 0–2, I Donnelly 0–1, S Graham 0–1, S McElhaddon 0–1, K Teague 0–1. | | C McGuigan 2–0, P O'Loane 0–6, S O'Connell 0–2. | Referee: L Maguire (Monaghan) |

Quarter-finals

| 8 June 1969 Quarter-final | Derry | 2–10 – 0–14 | Donegal | Casement Park, Belfast |
| | P Lynn 2–1, M Greene 0–6, G McCann 1–1, L Boyle 0–1, A Scullion 0–1. | | M McLoone 0–3, N Granaghan 0–3, D O'Carroll 0–3, S Ferriter 0–2, P McShea 0–1, J Quigley 0–1, A Gallagher 0–1. | Referee: L Maguire (Monaghan) |

| 15 June 1969 Quarter-final | Armagh | 0–8 – 1–9 | Monaghan | Athletic Grounds, Armagh |
| | J Smith 0–4, K France 0–2, T McCreesh 0–1, P Duffy 0–1. | | S Woods 1–6, E Tavey 0–1, B Dowling 0–1, G Fitzpatrick 0–1. | Referee: F Green (Antrim) |

| 15 June 1969 Quarter-final | Fermanagh | 2–4 – 1–9 | Cavan | St. Molaise Park, Irvinestown |
| | McPartlan 1–2, V Greene 1–0, PT Treacy 0–1, G Magee 0–1. | | G Cusack 1–2, S Duggan 0–2, O Brady 0–2, H Newman 0–2, JJ O'Reilly 0–1. | Referee: G Griffin (Donegal) |

| 22 June 1969 Quarter-final | Down | 0–8 – 0–4 | Antrim | Páirc Esler, Newry |
| | P Doherty 0–3, C McAlarney 0–2, J Murphy 0–2, M Cole 0–1. | | L Boyle 0–2, M Green 0–1, S McQuillan 0–1. | Referee: F Tierney (Cavan) |

Semi-finals

| 29 June 1969 Semi-final | Cavan | 2–3 – 0–9 | Derry | St. Tiernach's Park, Clones |
| | G Cusack 1–0, P Murray 1–0, D Coyle 0–1, C Gallagher 0–1, S Duggan 0–1. | | S Lagan 0–2, T McGuinness 0–2, S O'Connell 0–2, C McGuigan 0–1, F O'Loane 0–1, L Diamond 0–1. | Referee: P Hughes (Louth) |

| 6 July 1969 Semi-final | Down | 2–15 – 1–7 | Monaghan | Athletic Grounds, Armagh |
| | S O'Neill 0–7, J Murphy 1–1, J Purdy 1–0, S Morgan 0–3, P Rooney 0–1, C McAlarney 0–1, H McGrath 0–1, M Cole 0–1. | | S Woods 1–5, B Dowling 0–1, T McCrudden 0–1. | Referee: F Tierney (Cavan) |

| 13 July 1969 Semi-final replay | Cavan | 1–8 – 0–6 | Derry | St. Tiernach's Park, Clones |
| | G Cusack 1–2, C Gallagher 0–3, S Duggan 0–2, JJ O'Reilly 0–1. | | S O'Connell 0–3, T McGuinness 0–1, M Niblock 0–1, F O'Loan 0–1. | Referee: G Griffin (Donegal) |

Final

| 27 July 1969 Final | Cavan | 2–13 – 2–6 | Down | Casement Park, Belfast |
| | G Cusack 1–3, H McInerney 1–1, D Coyle 0–2, C Gallagher 0–2, S Duggan 0–2, JJ O'Reilly 0–2, H Newman 0–1. | | P Doherty 1–2, M Cole 1–0, S O'Neill 0–3, J Murphy 0–1. | Attendance: 40,000; Referee: T Johnston (Fermanagh) |

=== All-Ireland Senior Football Championship ===
Semi-finals

| 10 August 1969 Semi-final | Kerry | 0–14 – 1–10 | Mayo | Croke Park, Dublin |
| | M O'Dwyer 0–5, M O'Connell 0–3, B Lynch 0–2, P Griffin 0–2, E O'Donoghue 0–1, M Gleeson 0–1. | | J Corcoran 0–7, D Griffith 1–0, W McGee 0–2, S O'Dowd 0–1. | Attendance: 35,258; Referee: P Kelly (Dublin) |

| 24 August 1969 Semi-final | Offaly | 0–12 – 1–9 | Cavan | Croke Park, Dublin |
| | T McTague 0–10, S Evans 0–1, S Cooney 0–1. | | H McInerney 1–0, C Gallagher 0–3, E Cusack 0–2, O Brady 0–1, R Carolan 0–1, H Newman 0–1, S Duggan 0–1. | Attendance: 35,195; Referee: J Moloney (Tipperary) |

| 14 September 1969 Semi-final replay | Offaly | 3–8 – 1–10 | Cavan | Croke Park, Dublin |
| | P Keenan 1–1, S Evans 1–1, S Kilroy 1–0, T McTague 0–3, K Kilmurray 0–1, S Cooney 0–1, A Hickey 0–1. | | E Cusack 1–2, C Gallagher 0–3, S Duggan 0–3, H McInerney 0–2. | Attendance: 51,334; Referee: J Moloney (Tipperary) |

Final

| 28 September 1969 Final | Kerry | 0–10 – 0–7 | Offaly | Croke Park, Dublin |
| | M O'Connell 0–2, DJ Crowley 0–2, M Gleeson 0–2, M O'Dwyer 0–2, L Higgins 0–1, B Lynch 0–1. | | T McTague 0–3, S Evans 0–2, W Bryan 0–1, P Keennan 0–1. | Attendance: 67,828; Referee: J Moloney (Tipperary) |

== Championship statistics ==
=== Miscellaneous ===
- St. Coman's Park, Roscommon changed its name to Dr. Hyde Park after Ireland's first President, Douglas Hyde.
- The throw-in for the Munster quarter-final between Clare and Limerick was delayed by 25 minutes.
- At the Ulster semi-final between Cavan and Derry an 80-year-old retired farmer collapses and dies.
- The All-Ireland semi-final between Cavan and Offaly ends level and goes to a replay. It is the first time since 1960 that a semi-final ended in a draw which was the Down vs Offaly game.

=== Scorers ===
Overall

| Rank | Player | County | Tally | Total | Matches | Average |
|---|---|---|---|---|---|---|
| 1 | Tony McTague | Offaly | 1–33 | 36 | 6 | 6.00 |
| 2 | Jack Berry | Wexford | 2–18 | 24 | 4 | 6.00 |
| 3 | Joe Corcoran | Mayo | 1–20 | 23 | 4 | 5.75 |
| 4 | Jack Donnelly | Kildare | 0–20 | 20 | 3 | 6.66 |
| 5 | Seán Woods | Monaghan | 2–11 | 17 | 2 | 8.50 |

Single game

| Rank | Player | County | Tally | Total | Opposition |
|---|---|---|---|---|---|
| 1 | Tony McTague | Offaly | 0–10 | 10 | Cavan |
| 1 | Tony McTague | Offaly | 0–10 | 10 | Westmeath |
| 3 | John Nealon | Mayo | 3–0 | 9 | Leitrim |
| 3 | Tony Brennan | Meath | 1–6 | 9 | Kildare |
| 3 | Seán Woods | Monaghan | 1–6 | 9 | Armagh |
| 6 | Seán Sheridan | Wexford | 2–2 | 8 | Carlow |
| 6 | Seán Woods | Monaghan | 1–5 | 8 | Down |
| 6 | Jack Donnelly | Kildare | 0–8 | 8 | Meath |
| 6 | Mick Fallon | Roscommon | 0–8 | 8 | Sligo |
| 10 | Pat Lynn | Antrim | 2–1 | 7 | Donegal |
| 10 | Willie Magee | Mayo | 2–1 | 7 | Leitrim |
| 10 | Jack Berry | Wexford | 2–1 | 7 | Longford |
| 10 | Tony McTague | Offaly | 1–4 | 7 | Wexford |
| 10 | Joe Corcoran | Mayo | 0–7 | 7 | Kerry |
| 10 | Jack Donnelly | Kildare | 0–7 | 7 | Dublin |
| 10 | Jack Berry | Wexford | 0–7 | 7 | Offaly |
| 10 | John Cummins | Tipperary | 0–7 | 7 | Waterford |
| 10 | Seán O'Neill | Down | 0–7 | 7 | Monaghan |
