= Donie O'Sullivan (Gaelic footballer) =

Kerry Gaelic footballer

Personal information
- Native name: Dónal Ó Súilleabháin (Irish)
- Born: 1940 (age 85–86) Killarney, County Kerry, Ireland
- Occupation: Teacher
- Height: 5 ft 10 in (178 cm)

Sport
- Sport: Gaelic football
- Position: Corner-back
Clubs
- Years: Club
- 1950s–1970s: Dr Crokes, Spa, Clan na Gael, UCD, Kerry (New York)
Inter-county
Years	County	Apps (scores)
1962–1975	Kerry	35 (0-02)
Inter-county titles
- Munster titles: 9
- All-Irelands: 4
- NFL: 7
- All Stars: 2

Donie O'Sullivan (Irish: Dónal Ó Súilleabháin; born 1940) is an Irish former Gaelic footballer who played for the Spa club and at senior level for the Kerry county team between 1962 and 1975. He was the recipient of Kerry's first All Star Award in 1971, a feat he repeated in 1972. In 2019, he was inducted into Munster GAA's "hall of fame".

According to a 2019 interview, while studying educational psychology at St. John's University in New York during the 1960s, O'Sullivan was offered a contract by New York Jets coach Weeb Ewbank.

== See also ==
- List of Kerry senior Gaelic football team captains

Sporting positions
Preceded by Jer D. O'Connor	Kerry Senior Football Captain; 1966	Succeeded by Mick Morris (Gaelic footballer)
Preceded by Johnny Culloty	Kerry Senior Football Captain; 1970	Succeeded by Michael Gleeson (politician)
Achievements
Preceded by Johnny Culloty (Kerry)	All-Ireland SFC winning captain 1970	Succeeded by Willie Bryan (Offaly)
