= 1972–73 National Football League (Ireland) =

Gaelic football competition

League details
- Dates: October 1972 – 6 May 1973

League champions
- Winners: Kerry (11th win)
- Captain: Brendan Lynch

League runners-up
- Runners-up: Offaly
- Captain: Tony McTague

Other division winners
- Division 2: Tyrone

The 1972–73 National Football League was the 42nd staging of the National Football League (NFL), an annual Gaelic football tournament for the Gaelic Athletic Association county teams of Ireland.

Kerry beat Offaly in the final to complete a three-in-a-row, captain Brendan Lynch scoring 2-3.

== Format ==
=== Divisions ===
- Division One: 16 teams. Split into two groups of 8.
- Division Two: 16 teams. Split into two groups of 8.

=== Round-robin format ===
Each team played every other team in its division (or group where the division is split) once, either home or away.

=== Points awarded ===
2 points were awarded for a win and 1 for a draw.

=== Titles ===
- Teams in Division One competed for the National Football League title.
- Teams in Division Two competed for the National Football League Division Two title.

=== Knockout phase structure ===
In the Semi-Finals, the match-ups were as follows:

- Quarter-final 1: First-placed team in Division One (A) v Second-placed team in Division One (B)
- Quarter-final 2: Second-placed team in Division One (A) v First-placed team in Division One (B)

The final match-up is: Winner Semi-final 1 v Winner Semi-final 2.

== Division One ==
=== Tables ===
==== Group A ====
Team	Pld	W	D	L	Pts	Status
Offaly	7	6	0	1	12	Qualify for Knockout Stage
Kerry	7	5	0	2	10	Qualify for Knockout Stage
Galway	7	5	0	2	10
Longford	7	4	0	3	7
Cork	7	3	0	4	7
Roscommon	6	2	0	4	4
Dublin	6	1	0	5	4	Relegated to Division Two of the 1973–74 NFL
Kildare	7	1	0	6	2	Relegated to Division Two of the 1973–74 NFL

==== Group B ====
Team	Pld	W	D	L	Pts	Status
Derry	7	6	0	1	12	Qualify for Knockout Stage
Sligo	7	5	0	2	10	Qualify for Knockout Stage
Fermanagh	7	4	1	2	9
Cavan	7	3	1	3	7
Mayo	7	3	1	3	7
Westmeath	7	2	1	4	5
Meath	7	2	0	5	4	Relegated to Division Two of the 1973–74 NFL
Laois	7	1	0	6	2	Relegated to Division Two of the 1973–74 NFL

== Knockout stage ==
=== Division One ===
8 April 1973 Semi-Final	Kerry	0-11 — 2-5	Derry	Croke Park, Dublin

29 April 1973 Semi-Final Replay	Kerry	w/o — scr.	Derry	Croke Park, Dublin

15 April 1973 Semi-Final	Offaly	0-11 — 0-6	Sligo	Croke Park, Dublin

6 May 1973 Final	Kerry	2-12 — 0-14	Offaly	Croke Park, Dublin
	Brendan Lynch 2-3; Mick O'Dwyer 0-5; Mickey O'Sullivan 0-2; Eamonn O'Donoghue, Donie O'Sullivan 0-1 each			Attendance: 25,303; Referee: John Moloney (Tipperary)

=== Division Two ===
8 April 1973 Semi-Final	Tyrone	1-10 — 3-3	Wicklow	Croke Park, Dublin

15 April 1973 Semi-Final	Down	0-9 — 0-8	Tipperary	Croke Park, Dublin

6 May 1973 Final	Tyrone	1-13 — 0-15	Down	Croke Park, Dublin
