= 1971–72 National Football League (Ireland) =

Gaelic football competition

League details
- Dates: October 1971 – 14 May 1972

League champions
- Winners: Kerry (10th win)
- Captain: Mick Gleeson

League runners-up
- Runners-up: Mayo
- Captain: Ray Prendergast

Other division winners
- Division 2: Longford

The 1971–72 National Football League was the 41st staging of the National Football League (NFL), an annual Gaelic football tournament for the Gaelic Athletic Association county teams of Ireland.

Kerry successfully defended the Mayo title in the final for the second consecutive season.

== Format ==
=== Divisions ===
- Division One: 16 teams. Split into two groups of 8.
- Division Two: 16 teams. Split into two groups of 8.

=== Round-robin format ===
Each team played every other team in its division (or group where the division is split) once, either home or away.

=== Points awarded ===
2 points were awarded for a win and 1 for a draw.

=== Titles ===
- Teams in Division One competed for the National Football League title.
- Teams in Division Two competed for the National Football League Division Two title.

=== Knockout stage structure ===
In the Semi-Finals, the match-ups were as follows:

- Quarter-final 1: First-placed team in Division One (A) v Second-placed team in Division One (B)
- Quarter-final 2: Second-placed team in Division One (A) v First-placed team in Division One (B)

The final match-up is: Winner Semi-final 1 v Winner Semi-final 2.

=== Separation of teams on equal points ===
In the event that teams finish on equal points, then teams were separated according to points average(goals scored divided by goals conceded).

== Division One ==
=== Tables ===
==== Group A ====
Team	Pld	W	D	L	F	A	Aver	Pts	Notes
Offaly	7	7	0	0	116	65	1.785	14	Qualify for Knockout Stage
Kerry	7	5	0	2	114	80	1.425	10	Qualify for Knockout Stage
Dublin	7	3	2	2	82	73	1.123	8
Cork	7	3	1	3	73	74	0.986	7
Galway	7	2	2	3	91	80	1.138	6
Kildare	7	2	1	4	85	107	0.794	5
Waterford	7	1	2	4	51	95	0.537	4	Relegated to Division Two of the 1972–73 NFL
Tipperary	7	1	0	6	59	97	0.608	2	Relegated to Division Two of the 1972–73 NFL

==== Group B ====
Team	Pld	W	D	L	F	A	Aver	Pts	Notes
Derry	7	7	0	0	108	53	2.038	14	Qualify for Knockout Stage
Mayo	7	5	0	2	87	83	1.048	10	Qualify for Knockout Stage
Sligo	7	4	0	3	75	79	0.949	8
Laois	7	3	1	3	78	83	0.940	7
Meath	7	3	0	4	80	83	0.964	6
Fermanagh	7	2	1	4	88	96	0.917	5
Antrim	7	2	0	5	74	93	0.796	4	Relegated to Division Two of the 1972–73 NFL
Down	7	1	0	6	71	91	0.780	2	Relegated to Division Two of the 1972–73 NFL

== Division two ==
=== Tables ===
==== Group A ====
Team	Pld	W	D	L	F	A	Aver	Pts	Notes
Longford	7	7	0	0	106	58	1.828	14	Qualify for Knockout Stage; promoted to Division One of the 1972–73 NFL
Roscommon	7	6	0	1	123	52	2.365	12	Qualify for Knockout Stage; promoted to Division One of the 1972–73 NFL
Carlow	7	4	0	3	99	84	1.179	8
Clare	7	3	1	3	70	81	0.864	7
Limerick	7	3	0	4	84	96	0.875	6
Wexford	7	2	1	4	83	93	0.892	5
Wicklow	7	1	0	6	65	104	0.625	2
Kilkenny	7	1	0	6	68	130	0.523	2

==== Group B Table ====
Team	Pld	W	D	L	F	A	Aver	Pts	Notes
Cavan	7	6	0	1	97	47	2.064	12	Qualify for Knockout Stage; promoted to Division One of the 1972–73 NFL
Westmeath	7	5	0	2	109	81	1.346	10	Qualify for Knockout Stage; promoted to Division One of the 1972–73 NFL
Monaghan	7	4	2	1	76	60	1.267	10
Tyrone	7	4	0	3	60	61	0.984	8
Louth	7	3	1	3	76	75	1.013	7
Armagh	7	2	0	5	72	89	0.809	4
Donegal	7	1	1	5	64	99	0.646	3
Leitrim	7	1	0	6	73	115	0.635	2

== Knockout stage ==
=== Division One ===
9 April 1972 Semi-Final	Kerry	0-17 — 0-13	Derry	Croke Park, Dublin

16 April 1972 Semi-Final	Mayo	2-10 — 0-16	Offaly	Croke Park, Dublin

30 April 1972 Semi-Final Replay	Mayo	1-11 — 0-8	Offaly	Croke Park, Dublin

14 May 1972 Final	Kerry	2-11 — 1-9	Mayo	Croke Park, Dublin
	Liam Higgins 1-4; Mick Gleeson 1-0; Mick O'Connell 0-3; Donal Kavanagh 0-2; Mick O'Dwyer, Jackie Walsh 0-1 each		W McGee 1-1; T O’Malley, J Corcoran 0-3 each, S Kilbride, J Higgins 0-1 each	Attendance: 32,883; Referee: P O'Tiarnain (Cavan)

=== Division two ===
9 April 1972 Semi-Final	Roscommon	3-5 — 0-8	Cavan	Croke Park, Dublin

16 April 1972 Semi-Final	Longford	0-16 — 3-5	Westmeath	Pearse Park, Longford

30 April 1972 Final	Longford	0-9 — 0-6	Roscommon	Páirc Seán Mac Diarmada, Carrick-on-Shannon
