= Liam Higgins (Irish footballer) =

Irish Gaelic footballer

Personal information
- Native name: Liam Ó hUiginn (Irish)
- Born: Lispole, County Kerry, Ireland
- Occupation: Secondary teacher

Sport
- Sport: Gaelic football
- Position: Full-forward
Club
- Years: Club
- 1950s-1980s: Lispole
Inter-county
Years	County	Apps (scores)
1969-1973	Kerry	16 (2-20)
Inter-county titles
- Munster titles: 3
- All-Irelands: 2
- NFL: 4
- All Stars: 0

Liam Higgins (1945–2006) was an Irish sportsperson. He played Gaelic football with his local club Lispole and was a member of the Kerry senior inter-county team from 1969 until 1973.

== Management ==
After retiring he managed Lispole, West Kerry, he managed the Kerry junior team to Munster and All Ireland Championships in 1983. He also trained Dingle CBS to Two All Ireland Championships in 1996 and 2001. During his school days he trained some of the biggest names in Gaelic football including Darragh, Tomás & Marc Ó Sé, Dara Ó Cinnéide, Tommy Griffin & Diarmuid Murphy to name just a few.

== Personal life ==
He is a brother of former Socialist Party TD and former MEP for the Dublin constituency Joe Higgins. He taught Business Studies and Accounting in Dingle CBS.

Higgins died in November 2006 from oesophageal cancer.
