= Michael Gleeson (politician) =

Irish former Gaelic footballer and politician (born 1946)

Kerry County Councillor
- In office June 1999 – May 2021
- Constituency: Killarney

Personal details
- Born: 1946 (age 79–80) Killarney, County Kerry, Ireland
- Party: Kerry Independent Alliance
- Other political affiliations: Labour Party (until 1992)

Michael Gleeson
Personal information
- Height: 5 ft 11 in (180 cm)

Sport
- Sport: Gaelic football
- Position: Right corner-forward
Club
- Years: Club
- 1960s–1980s: Spa
Club titles
- Kerry titles: 3
- Munster titles: 1
- All-Ireland Titles: 1
Inter-county
Years	County	Apps (scores)
1969–1972	Kerry	15 (4-12)
Inter-county titles
- Munster titles: 3
- All-Irelands: 2
- NFL: 2
- All Stars: 0

Michael Gleeson (born 1946 in Killarney, County Kerry) is an Irish former politician and sportsperson.

== Sporting career ==
He played Gaelic football with his local club Spa and was a member of the Kerry senior inter-county team from 1969 until 1972. He was also a member of the Kerry junior team and won an All-Ireland Junior Football Championship medal in 1967.

He won three Kerry Senior Football Championships, a Munster Senior Club Football Championship and an All-Ireland Senior Club Football Championship with East Kerry. With Spa he won seven East Kerry Senior Football Championship titles and a County Intermediate Football Championship. During his college days in Dublin he won a Dublin Under 21 Football Championship with Erins Hope in 1966. He later played with UCD and won a Sigerson Cup with them.

== Political career ==
He was a Killarney town councillor from 1991 to 2014; and a Kerry County Councillor from 1983 to 1991 representing the Labour Party; and from 1999 to 2021 as part of the Kerry Independent Alliance. He was an unsuccessful candidate at the 2011 general election. He has also been Mayor of Killarney. He retired from politics in May 2021 and was replaced on the council by his nephew John O'Donoghue.

Sporting positions
Preceded by Donie O'Sullivan	Kerry Senior Football Captain; 1971	Succeeded by Tom Prendergast
