= 1970–71 National Football League (Ireland) =

Gaelic Football League

League details
- Dates: October 1970 – 20 June 1971

League champions
- Winners: Kerry (9th win)
- Captain: Donie O'Sullivan

League runners-up
- Runners-up: Mayo

The 1970–71 National Football League was the 40th staging of the National Football League (NFL), an annual Gaelic football tournament for the Gaelic Athletic Association county teams of Ireland.

Kerry beat Mayo in the final.

== Format ==
1970-71 saw the introduction of a new format.

=== Divisions ===
- Division One: 16 teams. Split into two groups of 8.
- Division Two: 16 teams. Split into two groups of 8.

=== Round-robin format ===
Each team played every other team in its division (or group where the division is split) once, either home or away.

=== Points awarded ===
2 points were awarded for a win and 1 for a draw.

=== Titles ===
- Teams in Division One competed for the National Football League title.
- Teams in Division Two competed for the National Football League Division Two title.

=== Knockout stage structure ===
In the semi-Finals, the match-ups were as follows:

- Quarter-final 1: First-placed team in Division One (A) v Second-placed team in Division One (B)
- Quarter-final 2: Second-placed team in Division One (A) v First-placed team in Division One (B)

The final match-up is: Winner Semi-final 1 v Winner Semi-final 2.

=== Separation of teams on equal points ===
In the event that teams finish on equal points, then a play-off will be used to determine group placings if necessary, i.e. where to decide relegation places or quarter-finalists.

== Group stage ==
=== Division One ===
==== Results ====
===== Division One (A) play-offs =====
2 May 1971 For 1st Place	Kerry	0-15 — 1-8	Dublin	Croke Park, Dublin

===== Division One (B) play-offs =====
25 April 1971 For 2nd Place	Derry	1-7 — 1-6	Antrim	Dungannon

==== Tables ====
===== Group A =====
Team	Pld	W	D	L	Pts	Status
Kerry	7	5	1	1	11	Qualified for Knockout Stage
Dublin	7	5	1	1	11	Qualified for Knockout Stage
Offaly	7	4	2	1	10
Cork	7	4	0	3	8
Kildare	7	3	1	3	7
Galway	7	3	1	3	7
Longford	7	1	0	6	2	Relegated to Division Two of the 1971–72 NFL
Roscommon	7	0	0	7	0	Relegated to Division Two of the 1971–72 NFL

=== Division two ===
==== Tables ====
===== Group A =====
Team	Pld	W	D	L	Pts	Status
Tipperary	7	7	0	0	14	Qualified for Knockout Stage; promoted to Division One of the 1971–72 NFL
Waterford	7	5	1	1	13	Qualified for Knockout Stage; promoted to Division One of the 1971–72 NFL
Limerick	7	5	0	2	10
Kilkenny	7	4	0	3	8
Wexford	7	2	1	4	5
Clare	7	2	1	4	5
Wicklow	7	1	1	5	3
Carlow	7	0	0	7	0

===== Group B =====
Team	Pld	W	D	L	Pts	Status
Laois	7	6	1	0	13	Qualified for Knockout Stage; promoted to Division One of the 1971–72 NFL
Fermanagh	7	6	0	1	12	Qualified for Knockout Stage; promoted to Division One of the 1971–72 NFL
Armagh	7	5	0	2	10
Westmeath	7	4	0	3	8
Monaghan	7	3	1	3	7
Tyrone	7	2	0	5	4
Donegal	7	1	0	6	2
Leitrim	7	0	0	7	0

== Knockout stage ==
=== Division One ===
16 May 1971 Semi-Final	Kerry	1-11 — 1-10	Derry	Croke Park, Dublin

24 May 1971 Semi-Final	Dublin	0-8 — 1-9	Mayo	Croke Park, Dublin

20 June 1971 Final	Kerry	0-11 — 0-8	Mayo	Croke Park, Dublin
	Mick O'Dwyer 0-6; Brendan Lynch 0-3; Donie O'Sullivan, Mick Gleeson 0-1 each		J Corcoran 0-7 (7f); T Fitzgerald 0-1	Attendance: 25,000; Referee: Paul Kelly (Dublin)

=== Division two ===
25 April 1971 Semi-Final	Tipperary	2-9 — 0-13	Fermanagh	Croke Park, Dublin

25 April 1971 Semi-Final	Waterford	1-9 — 0-6	Laois	Nowlan Park, Kilkenny

16 May 1971 Final	Tipperary	0-10 — 1-6	Waterford	Clonmel
