= Tom Prendergast (Kerry footballer) =

Irish hurler and Gaelic footballer

Personal information
- Native name: Tomás de Priondragás (Irish)
- Born: 1943 (age 82–83) Castlemaine, County Kerry
- Height: 5 ft 8 in (173 cm)

Sport
- Sport: Gaelic football
- Position: Right wing-back
Club
- Years: Club
- 1950s-1970s: Keel
Club titles
- Kerry titles: 1 Football 1 Hurling
Inter-county
Years	County	Apps (scores)
1966-1973	Kerry; Wicklow; Donegal; Cork	23 (1-06)
Inter-county titles
- Munster titles: 4
- All-Irelands: 2
- NFL: 3
- All Stars: 0

Tom Prendergast (born 1943 in Castlemaine, County Kerry) is an Irish former sportsperson. He played Gaelic football with his local club Keel and was a member of the Kerry county team at senior level in the 1960s and 1970s. He won the Texaco Footballer of the Year in 1970. During the 1960s he also played with Wicklow, Donegal and Cork.

At club level with Keel he won a Kerry Intermediate Football Championship, Kerry Junior Football Championship and a number of Mid Kerry Senior Football Championship, he also won a Kerry Senior Football Championship with Mid Kerry. He also played hurling with the Killarney club and won a County Hurling Championship medal in 1969.

Sporting positions
Preceded by Michael Gleeson (politician)	Kerry Senior Football Captain; 1972	Succeeded by Paudie O'Donoghue
