= 1968–69 National Football League (Ireland) =

Gaelic football competition

League details
- Dates: October 1968 – 29 June 1969

League champions
- Winners: Kerry (8th win)
- Captain: Johnny Culloty

League runners-up
- Runners-up: New York
- Captain: Mickey Moynihan

The 1968–69 National Football League was the 38th staging of the National Football League (NFL), an annual Gaelic football tournament for the Gaelic Athletic Association county teams of Ireland.

Kerry beat Offaly in the home final, and then New York in the two-legged final.

== Format ==
=== Divisions ===
- Division One: 8 teams. Split into two groups of 4.
- Division Two: 8 teams. Split into two groups of 4.
- Division Three: 8 teams. Split into two groups of 4.
- Division Four: 8 teams. Split into two groups of 4.

The top 2 in each group progressed to the Division Semi-finals. The winners of the Division Finals played off in the NFL semi-finals.

=== Round-robin format ===
- Division Three (A): Played as a double round-robin.
- All other groups: Single Round-Robin. Each team played every other team in its division (or group where the division is split) once, either home or away.

=== Points awarded ===
2 points were awarded for a win and 1 for a draw.

=== Titles ===
Teams in all four divisions competed for the National Football League title.

=== Promotion and relegation ===
None. All divisions had equal status.

== Knockout-phase results and tables ==
=== Division One ===
==== Division One (A) regulation games ====
| 16 February 1969 Round 2 | Down | 1-7 — 0-7 | Meath | Navan |

| 9 March 1969 Round 3 | Down | 1-7 — 0-6 | Antrim | Newcastle |

==== Division One (B) play-offs ====
| 9 March 1969 For 1st Place | Dublin | 0-7 — 0-3 | Westmeath | Raheny |

==== Division One inter-group play-offs ====
| 16 March 1969 Semi-final | Westmeath | 0-13 — 1-8 | Down | Carrickmacross |

| 16 March 1969 Semi-final | Dublin | 1-10 — 0-9 | Meath | Drogheda |

| 30 March 1969 Final | Westmeath | 1-8 — 1-6 | Dublin | Navan |

==== Division One (A) table ====
| Team | Pld | W | D | L | Pts | Status |
|---|---|---|---|---|---|---|
| Down | 3 | 2 | 1 | 0 | 5 |
| Meath | 3 | 2 | 1 | 1 | 4 |
| Antrim | 3 | 1 | 0 | 2 | 2 |
| Louth | 3 | 0 | 1 | 2 | 1 |

==== Division One (B) table ====
| Team | Pld | W | D | L | Pts | Status |
|---|---|---|---|---|---|---|
| Dublin | 3 | 2 | 0 | 1 | 4 |
| Westmeath | 3 | 2 | 0 | 1 | 4 | Qualified for knockout phase |
| Monaghan | 3 | 1 | 1 | 1 | 3 |
| Armagh | 3 | 0 | 1 | 2 | 1 |

=== Division Two ===
==== Division Two (A) play-offs ====
| 2 March 1969 For 1st Place | Sligo | 0-12 — 0-7 | Donegal | Sligo |

==== Division Two inter-group play-offs ====
| 9 March 1969 Semi-final | Donegal | 2-10 — 1-7 | Derry | Dungannon |

| 23 March 1969 Semi-final | Cavan | 2-10 — 1-3 | Sligo | Carrick-on-Shannon |

| 30 March 1969 Final | Donegal | 0-10 — 1-6 | Cavan | Dungannon |

==== Division Two (A) table ====
| Team | Pld | W | D | L | Pts | Status |
|---|---|---|---|---|---|---|
| Sligo | 3 | 2 | 0 | 1 | 4 |
| Donegal | 3 | 2 | 0 | 1 | 4 | Qualified for knockout phase |
| Leitrim | 3 | 1 | 0 | 2 | 2 |
| Fermanagh | 3 | 1 | 0 | 2 | 2 |

==== Division Two (B) table ====
| Team | Pld | W | D | L | Pts | Status |
|---|---|---|---|---|---|---|
| Derry | 3 | 2 | 1 | 0 | 5 |
| Cavan | 3 | 1 | 1 | 1 | 3 |
| Tyrone | 3 | 1 | 0 | 2 | 2 |
| Longford | 3 | 1 | 0 | 2 | 2 |

=== Division Three ===
==== Division Three (A) regulation games ====
| 9 March 1969 Round 5 | Clare | 1-7 — 0-4 | Mayo | Kilrush |

| 9 March 1969 Round 5 | Galway | 1-5 — 0-7 | Roscommon | Ballinasloe |

| 23 March 1969 Round 6 | Mayo | 0-6 — 2-9 | Roscommon | Crossmolina |

| 23 March 1969 Round 6 | Clare | 0-4 — 0-13 | Galway | Milltown Malbay |

==== Division Three (A) play-offs ====
| 30 March 1969 For 2nd Place | Mayo | 2-7 — 0-8 | Roscommon | Ballinasloe |

==== Division Three inter-group play-offs ====
| 30 March 1969 Semi-final | Cork | 3-8 — 1-8 | Galway | Gaelic Grounds, Limerick |

| 13 April 1969 Semi-final | Kerry | 0-11 — 0-11 | Mayo | Gaelic Grounds, Limerick |
| | | | | Attendance: 4,000 |

| 20 April 1969 Semi-final Replay | Kerry | 2-9 — 1-5 | Mayo | Galway |

| 27 April 1969 Final | Kerry | 2-5 — 0-9 | Cork | Cork Athletic Grounds |

==== Division Three (A) table ====
| Team | Pld | W | D | L | Pts | Status |
|---|---|---|---|---|---|---|
| Galway | 6 | 5 | 0 | 1 | 10 |
| Mayo | 6 | 3 | 0 | 3 | 6 |
| Roscommon | 6 | 3 | 0 | 3 | 6 |
| Clare | 6 | 1 | 0 | 5 | 2 |

==== Division Three (B) table ====
| Team | Pld | W | D | L | Pts | Status |
|---|---|---|---|---|---|---|
| Kerry | 3 | 3 | 0 | 0 | 6 | Qualified for knockout phase |
| Cork | 3 | 2 | 0 | 1 | 4 |
| Tipperary | 3 | 1 | 0 | 2 | 2 |
| Limerick | 3 | 0 | 0 | 3 | 0 |

=== Division Four ===
==== Division Four (B) play-offs ====
| 9 March 1969 For 1st Place | Kildare | 6-11 — 0-3 | Waterford | Newbridge |

==== Division Four inter-group play-offs ====
| 16 March 1969 Semi-final | Offaly | 2-12 — 2-3 | Waterford | Tullamore |

| 16 March 1969 Semi-final | Kildare | 2-7 — 0-13 | Laois | Tullamore |

| 23 March 1969 Semi-final Replay | Kildare | 1-17 — 1-6 | Laois | Carlow |

| 30 March 1969 Final | Offaly | 1-8 — 1-8 | Kildare | O'Moore Park, Portlaoise |

| 13 April 1969 Final replay | Offaly | 0-8 — 1-2 | Kildare | O'Moore Park, Portlaoise |

==== Division Four (A) table ====
| Team | Pld | W | D | L | Pts | Status |
|---|---|---|---|---|---|---|
| Offaly | 3 | 2 | 1 | 0 | 5 | Qualified for knockout phase |
| Laois | 3 | 1 | 1 | 1 | 3 |
| Wicklow | 3 | 1 | 0 | 2 | 2 |
| Carlow | 3 | 1 | 0 | 2 | 2 |

==== Division Four (B) table ====
| Team | Pld | W | D | L | Pts | Status |
|---|---|---|---|---|---|---|
| Kildare | 3 | 2 | 1 | 0 | 5 |
| Waterford | 3 | 2 | 1 | 0 | 5 |
| Wexford | 3 | 1 | 0 | 2 | 2 |
| Kilkenny | 3 | 0 | 0 | 3 | 0 |

== Knockout-phase results ==
=== Semi-finals ===
20 April 1969

| Offaly | 2-13 – 1-3 | Donegal |

Croke Park, Dublin

11 May 1969

| Kerry | 2-12 – 2-8 | Westmeath |

Croke Park, Dublin

=== Finals ===
18 May 1969
Home Final

| Kerry | 3-11 – 0-8 | Offaly |
|---|---|---|
| Mick O'Dwyer 2-2; Dom O'Donnell 1-0; Brendan Lynch 0-3; Mick O'Connell, DJ Crowley, Eamonn O'Donoghue 0-2 each |

Croke Park, Dublin
Attendance: 35,936
Referee: Mick Loftus, Mayo

22 June 1969
Final, first leg

| Kerry | 0-12 – 0-12 | New York |
|---|---|---|
| Mick O'Dwyer 0-6; Brendan Lynch 0-4; Eamonn O'Donoghue, Pat Moynihan 0-1 each |

Gaelic Park, New York City
Attendance: 10,000
Referee: Paul Kelly (Dublin)

29 June 1969
Final, second leg

| Kerry | 2-21 – 2-12 | New York |
|---|---|---|
| Mick O'Connell 0-9; Brendan Lynch 1-3; Mick O'Dwyer 0-5; Tom Prendergast 1-1; Eamonn O'Donoghue 0-2; DJ Crowley 0-1 |

Gaelic Park, New York City
Referee: Paul Kelly (Dublin)

Kerry win 39–30 on aggregate.
