= 1960 All-Ireland Senior Football Championship final =

- Event: 1960 All-Ireland Senior Football Championship
Down	Kerry
2–10 (16)	0–8 (8)
- Date: 25 September 1960
- Venue: Croke Park, Dublin
- Referee: John Dowling (Offaly)
- Attendance: 87,768

The 1960 All-Ireland Senior Football Championship final was the 73rd All-Ireland Final and the deciding match of the 1960 All-Ireland Senior Football Championship, an inter-county Gaelic football tournament for the top teams in Ireland.

== Match ==
=== Summary ===
The game turned in Down's favour 11 minutes into the second half with James McCartan scoring a goal directly from a line ball; two minutes later Paddy Doherty scored a penalty.

This was Down's first ever appearance in an All-Ireland final, and it brought with it their first win. It was the first of three All-Ireland football titles won by Down in the 1960s, which made them joint "team of the decade" with Galway who also won three. Down won their next four All-Ireland football finals, with this run only broken in their sixth appearance, by a one-point defeat to Cork in 2010.

This was also the first championship meeting of Down and Kerry.

Down returned to that stage of the competition for the fiftieth anniversary, the 2010 All-Ireland Senior Football Championship final.

=== Details ===
25 September 1960
Final

Down	2–10 – 0–8	Kerry
P Doherty 1–5, J McCartan 1–1, T Hadden 0–2, J Lennon & S O'Neill 0–1		T Lyne 0–4, M O'Connell 0–2, JD O'Connor & S Murphy 0–1

Croke Park, Dublin
Attendance: 87,768
Referee: John Dowling (Offaly)

==== Down ====
- 1 E. McKay
- 2 G. Lavery
- 3 L. Murphy
- 4 P. Rice
- 5 K. Mussen (c)
- 6 D. McCartan
- 7 K.O'Neill
- 8 J. Lennon
- 9 J. Carey
- 10 S. O'Neill
- 11 J. McCartan
- 12 P. Doherty
- 13 T. Hadden
- 14 P. O'Hagan
- 15 B. Morgan

Sub used
17 K. Denvir for J. Lennon

Subs not used
16 E. Clements
18 P. J. McElroy
19 J. Kaughlain
20 P. Fitzsimons

Manager
B. Carr

==== Kerry ====
- 1 J. Culloty
- 2 J. O'Shea
- 3 N. Sheehy
- 4 T. Lyons
- 5 Seán Murphy
- 6 K. Coffey
- 7 M. O'Dwyer
- 8 M. O'Connell
- 9 J. D. O'Connor
- 10 Séamus Murphy
- 11 T. Long
- 12 P. Sheehy (c)
- 13 G. McMahon
- 14 John Dowling
- 15 T. Lyne

Subs used
Jack Dowling for John Dowling
J. Brosnan for G. McMahon
D. McAuliffe for T. Lyne
