= Dan McCartan =

Northern Irish Gaelic footballer (1939–2024

Personal information
- Native name: Dónall Mac Artáin (Irish)
- Nickname: Big Dan
- Born: May 1939 Newry, County Down, Northern Ireland
- Died: 3 March 2024 (aged 84) Downpatrick, County Down, Northern Ireland
- Occupation: Dentist
- Height: 6 ft 0 in (183 cm)

Sport
- Sport: Gaelic football
- Position: Centre-back
Clubs
- Years: Club
- Glenn; Tullylish; Carryduff
Club titles
- Down titles: 3
Inter-county
- Years: County
- 1958–1976: Down
Inter-county titles
- Ulster titles: 8
- All-Irelands: 3
- NFL: 3
- All Stars: 0

Daniel McCartan (May 1939 – 3 March 2024) was a Northern Irish Gaelic footballer, selector and manager. He played at club level with Glenn, Tullylish and Carryduff and at inter-county level with the Down senior football team.

== Playing career ==
McCartan had his first Gaelic football successes as a student at St Colman's College in Newry. He won consecutive MacRory Cups in his last two years as a student, as well as being a Hogan Cup runner-up in 1957. McCartan began his adult club career with Glenna round this time, and won Down SFC titles in 1959, 1962 and 1963. He later transferred to the Tullylish club before ending his career with Carryduff.

McCartan was just 19-years-old when he was drafted onto the Down senior football team. His career coincided with Down's most successful era ever, and he won All-Ireland SFC medals in 1960, 1961 and 1968. McCartan was also part of eight Ulster SFC-winning teams and collected three National League titles. He also won four Railway Cup medals with Ulster. McCartan's inter-county career was brought to an end when he was dropped from the Down team in January 1976.

== Management career ==
When his playing career ended, McCartan became involved in team management and coaching. He was a selector when the Down senior team won the Ulster SFC title in 1978 . McCartan was also a selector when the Down minor team beat Cork to win the All-Ireland MFC title in 1987.

== Personal life and death ==
His brother, James McCartan, was a teammate on Down's All-Ireland SFC-winning teams in 1960 and 1961. His nephews, James McCartan Jnr and Daniel McCartan, also played with Down. McCartan qualified as a dentist and practiced for many years on the Andersonstown Road in west Belfast.

McCartan died in the Downe Hospital on 3 March 2024, at the age of 84.

== Honours ==
=== Player ===
St Colman's college

- MacRory Cup: 1957, 1958

Glenn

- Down Senior Football Championship: 1959, 1962, 1963

Down

- All-Ireland Senior Football Championship: 1960, 1961, 1968
- Ulster Senior Football Championship: 1959, 1960, 1961, 1963, 1965, 1966, 1968, 1971
- National Football League: 1959–60, 1961–62, 1967–68

=== Management ===
Down

- Ulster Senior Football Championship: 1978
- National Football League: 1982–83
- All-Ireland Minor Football Championship: 1987
- Ulster Minor Football Championship: 1987
