= Kevin O'Neill (Down Gaelic footballer) =

Northern Irish Gaelic footballer (1937–2026)

Personal information
- Native name: Caoimhín Ó Néill (Irish)
- Born: 1937 Newry, Northern Ireland
- Died: 21 October 2026 (aged 89) Newry, Northern Ireland
- Occupation: Vet
- Height: 5 ft 9 in (175 cm)

Sport
- Sport: Gaelic football
- Position: Left wing-back
Club
- Years: Club
- Newry Mitchels
Club titles
- Down titles: 4
College
- Years: College
- University College Dublin
College titles
- Sigerson titles: 1
Inter-county
- Years: County
- 1958–1963: Down
Inter-county titles
- Ulster titles: 4
- All-Irelands: 2
- NFL: 2

Kevin O'Neill (1937 – 21 October 2026) was a Northern Irish Gaelic footballer. At club level, he played with John Mitchel and at inter-county level with the Down senior football team.

== Career ==
Born and raised in Newry, County Down, O'Neill attended the Abbey CBS. He lined out in all grades of Gaelic football during his time there and won a MacRory Cup medal in 1954. He later studied veterinary medicine at University College Dublin and won a Sigerson Cup medal in 1962. At club level, O'Neill played with Newry Mitchels and won four Down SFC titles between 1960 and 1968.

At inter-county level, O'Neill first played for Down as a member of the minor team before winnng an Ulster JFC medal with the junior team in 1958. He also made his senior team that year in a Dr Lagan Cup game against Derry. O'Neill won the first of three Ulster SFC medals in 1959. He was at wing-back, with his brother Seán lining out in the forwards, when Down beat Kerry by 2–10 to 0–08 in the 1960 All-Ireland SFC final.

O'Neill won a second consecutive All-Ireland SFC medal in 1961, after coming on as a substitute in the 3–06 to 2–08 win over Offaly. He also claimed two National League titles. O'Neill won a fourth Ulster SFC mdal in 1963, before bringing his inter-county career to an end.

== Death ==
O'Neill died on 21 October 2026, aged 89.

== Honours ==
Abbey CBS

- MacRory Cup (1): 1954

University College Dublin

- Sigerson Cup (1): 1962

Newry Mitchels

- Down Senior Football Championship (4): 1960, 1964, 1967, 1968

Down

- All-Ireland Senior Football Championship (2): 1960, 1961
- Ulster Senior Football Championship (4): 1959, 1960, 1961, 1963
- National Football League (2): 1959–60, 1961–62
