= George Lavery =

Northern Irish Gaelic footballer (1931–2024)

Personal information
- Native name: Seoirse Ó Labhraí (Irish)
- Born: April 1931 Moira, Northern Ireland
- Died: 8 May 2024 (aged 93) Belfast, Northern Ireland
- Height: 5 ft 10 in (178 cm)

Sport
- Sport: Gaelic football
- Position: Left corner-back
Club
- Years: Club
- Kilwarlin
Club titles
- Down titles: 0
Inter-county
- Years: County
- 1952 1953–1965: Antrim; Down
Inter-county titles
- Ulster titles: 5
- All-Irelands: 2
- NFL: 2

James George Lavery (April 1931 – 8 May 2024) was a Northern Irish Gaelic footballer and selector. He played at club level with Kilwarlin and at inter-county level with the Down senior football team.

== Playing career ==
Lavery first played Gaelic football at inter-county level with the Antrim senior football team. He made his debut in the Dr Lagan Cup in 1952, but declared for Down the following year. After missing the 1958 Ulster final due to confusion in his travel arrangements, Lavery won his first provincial medal in 1959. It was the first of three successive Ulster SFC titles, while he also claimed consecutive All-Ireland SFC medals in 1960 and 1961. Lavery won five Ulster SFC titles in all, as well as two National League titles. He was also a substitute on the Ulster team that claimed Railway Cup honours in 1956.

== Management career ==
After bringing his inter-county career to an end in 1965, Lavery moved to management and immediately became a selector with the Down senior team. During his tenure with the team, Down won two Ulster SFC titles, a National League title and a third All-Ireland SFC title after beating Kerry in the 1968 All-Ireland final.

== Death ==
Lavery died at a Belfast nursing home on 8 May 2024, at the age of 93.

== Honours ==
=== Player ===
Down

- All-Ireland Senior Football Championship: 1960, 1961
- Ulster Senior Football Championship: 1959, 1960, 1961, 1963, 1965
- National Football League: 1959–60, 1961–62

Ulster

- Railway Cup: 1956

=== Management ===
Down

- All-Ireland Senior Football Championship: 1968
- Ulster Senior Football Championship: 1966, 1968
- National Football League: 1967–68
