= Tony Hadden =

Northern Irish Gaelic footballer (1936–2025

Personal information
- Native name: Antóin Ó hAidín (Irish)
- Born: 1936 Newry, Northern Ireland
- Died: 7 August 2025 (aged 89) Portadown, Northern Ireland
- Height: 5 ft 11 in (180 cm)

Sport
- Sport: Gaelic football
- Position: Right corner-forward
Club
- Years: Club
- Newry Shamrocks
Club titles
- Down titles: 2
Inter-county
- Years: County
- 1954–1964: Down
Inter-county titles
- Ulster titles: 4
- All-Irelands: 2
- NFL: 2

Anthony Hadden (1936 – 7 August 2025) was a Northern Irish Gaelic footballer and selector. At club level, he played with Newry Shamrocks and at inter-county level with the Down senior football team.

== Playing career ==
Hadden played Gaelic football at all levels during his time as a student at Abbey CBS in Newry. He later played with the Shamrocks club and won Down SFC medals in 1956 and 1961.

At inter-county level, he first played for Down as part of the Minor team in 1954. He made his senior team debut in a Dr Lagan Cup game in September 1954. Hadden lined out with the junior team in 1955, while he was on and off the senior team over the course of the following few years. He won an Ulster JFC medal in 1958.

Hadden won his first Ulster SFC medal in 1959. It was the first of three successive Ulster SFC titles, while he also claimed consecutive All-Ireland SFC medals in 1960 and 1961. Hadden won four Ulster SFC titles in all, as well as two National League titles. He was also part of the Ulster team that claimed Railway Cup honours in 1960.

== Management career ==
After bringing his inter-county career to an end in 1964, Hadden later moved to team management and coaching. In 1977, he was part of the team management that guided Down to a first All-Ireland MFC success with victory over Meath. In 1981, Hadden was a senior team selector when Down won the Ulster SFC title.

== Death ==
Hadden died on 7 August 2025, at the age of 89.

== Honours ==
=== Player ===
Newry Shamrocks

- Down Senior Football Championship: 1956, 1961
- Down Junior Football Championship: 1973
- Down Minor Football Championship: 1953, 1954

Down

- All-Ireland Senior Football Championship: 1960, 1961
- Ulster Senior Football Championship: 1959, 1960, 1961, 1963,
- National Football League: 1959–60, 1961–62
- Ulster Junior Football Championship: 1958

Ulster

- Railway Cup: 1960

=== Management ===
Down

- Ulster Senior Football Championship: 1981
- All-Ireland Minor Football Championship: 1977
- Ulster Minor Football Championship: 1977
