= P. J. McElroy =

Northern Irish Gaelic footballer (1932–2022)

Personal information
- Native name: P. S. Mac Giolla Rua (Irish)
- Born: 1932 Leitrim, County Down, Northern Ireland
- Died: 28 October 2022 (aged 90) Dundonald, County Down, Northern Ireland
- Occupation: Forester
- Height: 5 ft 10 in (178 cm)

Sport
- Sport: Gaelic football
- Position: Full-forward
Clubs
- Years: Club
- Liatroim Fontenoys; Glenn
Club titles
- Down titles: 2
College
- Years: College
- University College Dublin
College titles
- Sigerson titles: 1
Inter-county
- Years: County
- 1953-1962: Down
Inter-county titles
- Ulster titles: 3
- All-Irelands: 2
- NFL: 2

Patrick Joseph McElroy (1932 – 28 October 2022) was a Gaelic footballer from Northern Ireland. He played with club sides Liatroim Fontenoys and Glenn, and at inter-county level with the Down senior football team.

== Career ==
McElroy first played Gaelic football as a schoolboy at St. Colman's College in Newry. He was at midfield on the college's first MacRory Cup-winning team in 1949, before retaining the title in 1950. McElroy's performances for St. Colman's resulted in him being selected for the Ulster colleges team. He later lined out with University College Dublin and won a Sigerson Cup medal in 1953. At club level, McElroy began his career with Liatroim Fontenoys before later winning consecutive Down SFC medals with Glenn in 1962 and 1963.

McElroy made his first championship appearance for the Down senior football team against Derry in 1953. He was a regular on the team for the next few years and also lined out for Ulster in the Railway Cup, however, his inter-county career was temporarily halted when he undertook a forestry course in Wales from 1955 to 1957. McElroy re-joined the team upon his return and won the first of three successive Ulster SFC medals in 1959. He added a National League title to his collection in 1960 before also winning the first of two consecutive All-Ireland SFC titles that season, as the Sam Maguire Cup crossed the border for the first time. McElroy won a second league title in 1962 before bringing an end to his career after Down's defeat in the 1962 Ulster final.

== Personal life and death ==
McElroy worked as a forester and spent a number of years working in Tollymore Forest in County Down alongside the head forester Alfred A. Rogers, helping to create and run Northern Ireland's first state forest park. He also worked as a consultant with Ballycassidy Sawmills. His wife Bridie, whom he married in 1962, was a sister of John and Felix McKnight who played Gaelic football with Armagh. Another brother-in-law, Kevin O'Neill, was a contemporary of McElroy's on the Down team.

McElroy died at the Ulster Hospital 8 October 2022, at the age of 90.

== Honours ==
St. Colman's College

- MacRory Cup: 1949, 1950

University College Dublin

- Sigerson Cup: 1953

Glenn

- Down Senior Football Championship: 1962, 1963

Down

- All-Ireland Senior Football Championship: 1960, 1961
- Ulster Senior Football Championship: 1959, 1960, 1961
- National Football League: 1959–60, 1961–62
