= Eddie McKay (Gaelic footballer) =

Northern Irish Gaelic footballer (1937–2024)

Personal information
- Native name: Éamon Mac Aodha (Irish)
- Born: October 1937 Dundrum, County Down, Northern Ireland
- Died: 21 August 2024 (aged 86) Dundonald, County Down, Northern Ireland
- Height: 5 ft 9 in (175 cm)

Sport
- Sport: Gaelic football
- Position: Goalkeeper
Club
- Years: Club
- Dundrum
Club titles
- Down titles: 0
Inter-county
- Years: County
- 1957–1962: Down
Inter-county titles
- Ulster titles: 3
- All-Irelands: 2
- NFL: 2

Edward (Éamon) McKay (October 1937 – 21 August 2024) was a Northern Irish Gaelic footballer and coach. He played at club level with Dundrum and at inter-county level with the Down senior football team.

== Playing career ==
McKay made his Down senior football team debut in an Ulster SFC defeat of Donegal in 1957. He won his first provincial medal two years later in 1959. It was the first of three successive Ulster SFC titles, while he also claimed consecutive All-Ireland SFC medals in 1960 and 1961. McKay was part of two National Football League title-winning teams.

== Coaching career ==
McKay subsequently went on to manage a number of Down clubs, including Downpatrick and Longstone. He guided the Dundrum club from Division 4 to Division 2 in one calendar year.

== Death ==
McKay died at Ulster Hospital on 21 August 2024, at the age of 86.

== Honours ==
Down

- All-Ireland Senior Football Championship: 1960, 1961
- Ulster Senior Football Championship: 1959, 1960, 1961
- National Football League: 1959–60, 1961–62
