= Barney Carr (Gaelic footballer) =

Gaelic footballer and manager from Northern Ireland (1923–2021)

Personal information
- Native name: Brian Ó Cearra (Irish)
- Nickname: Barney
- Born: 1923 Warrenpoint, County Down, Northern Ireland
- Died: 30 November 2021 (aged 98) Warrenpoint, County Down, Northern Ireland
- Occupations: Education and welfare officer

Sport
- Sport: Gaelic football
Club
- Years: Club
- 1940-1957: St Peter's, Warrenpoint
Club titles
- Down titles: 3
Inter-county
- Years: County
- 1943–1952: Down
Inter-county titles
- Ulster titles: 0
- All-Irelands: 0
- NFL: 0

Bernard Ross Carr (1923 – 30 November 2021), known as Barney Carr, was an Irish Gaelic football player and manager. At club level he played with St Peter's, Warrenpoint and was also a member of the Down senior football team whom he managed to All-Ireland Championships in 1960 and 1961. He died in Warrenpoint on 30 November 2021, at the age of 98.

== Playing career ==
Carr first came to Gaelic football prominence as a member of the St Peter's, Warrenpoint team. He made his senior debut at the age of 17 and won three County Championship titles before his retirement in 1957. Carr made his first appearance on the inter-county scene as a member of the Down minor football team in 1941, before being selected for the Down senior football team two years later. Carr spent ten seasons with the team, during which time he won a Dr McKenna Cup title in 1944.

== Administrative and managerial career ==
Carr began his administrative career as a member of the Down East Divisional Board. He served as the Down representative to the Ulster Council from 1955 before beginning a long-standing association with the Down County Board in 1958. Carr began a four-year tenure as manager of the Down senior team in 1959. During that time the team enjoyed unprecedented success, including four Ulster Championships in five seasons and back-to-back All-Ireland Championships.

== Honours ==
=== Player ===
St Peter's, Warrenpoint

- Down Senior Football Championship: 1943, 1948, 1953

Down

- Dr McKenna Cup: 1944

=== Manager ===
Down

- All-Ireland Senior Football Championship: 1960, 1961
- Ulster Senior Football Championship: 1959, 1960, 1961, 1963
- National Football League: 1959–60, 1961–62
