= Down–Kerry Gaelic football rivalry =

Sports rivalry in Ireland

Down-Kerry
- Location: County Down; County Kerry
- Teams: Down; Kerry
- First meeting: Down 2-10 - 0-8 Kerry; 1960 All-Ireland final (25 September 1960)
- Latest meeting: Down 1-16 - 1-10 Kerry; 2010 All-Ireland quarter-final (31 July 2010)

Statistics
- Total meetings: 5
- Most wins: Down (5)
- Top scorer: Paddy Doherty (1-14)
- All-time series: Down 5-0 Kerry

The Down-Kerry rivalry is a Gaelic football rivalry between Irish county teams Down and Kerry, who first played each other in 1960. While Down's home ground is Páirc Esler and Kerry's home ground is Fitzgerald Stadium, all of their championship meetings have been held at neutral venues, usually Croke Park. Down won all five championship games, played by the sides, in 1960, 1961, 1968, 1991 and 2010.

== All-time results ==
=== Legend ===
Down win

=== Senior ===
No.	Date	Winners	Score	Runners-up	Venue	Stage
1.	25 September 1960	Down	2-10 - 0-8	Kerry	Croke Park	All-Ireland final
2.	6 August 1961	Down	1-12 - 0-9	Kerry	Croke Park	All-Ireland semi-final
3.	22 September 1968	Down	2-12 - 1-13	Kerry	Croke Park	All-Ireland final
4.	11 August 1991	Down	2-9 - 0-8	Kerry	Croke Park	All-Ireland semi-final
5.	31 July 2010	Down	1-16 - 1-10	Kerry	Croke Park	All-Ireland quarter-final
