= Brendan Sloan =

Personal information
- Native name: Breandán Ó Sluáin (Irish)
- Born: 1948 Atticall, County Down, Northern Ireland
- Died: 24 March 2016 (aged 67) Atticall, County Down, Northern Ireland

Sport
- Sport: Gaelic football
- Position: Right corner-back
Club
- Years: Club
- Atticall
Club titles
- Down titles: 0
Inter-county
Years	County	Apps (scores)
1967–1978	Down	32 (0–00)
Inter-county titles
- Ulster titles: 3
- All-Irelands: 1
- NFL: 1

Brendan Sloan (1948 – 24 March 2016) was a Northern Irish Gaelic footballer who played as a right corner-back for the Down senior team.

Born in Atticall, County Down, Sloan first played competitive Gaelic football in his youth. He became involved with the Atticall club at juvenile levels before eventually enjoying a lengthy career at senior level.

Sloan made his debut on the inter-county scene at the age of seventeen when he first linked up with the Down minor team in 1966. An All-Ireland runner-up in this grade, he subsequently joined the Down under-21 team. Sloan made his senior début during the 1967 championship. He went on to play a key role during a successful era, and won one All-Ireland medal, three Ulster medals and one National League medal.

Throughout his inter-county career Sloan made 32 championship appearances. He retired from inter-county football following the conclusion of the 1978 championship.

== Playing career ==
=== Inter-county ===
Sloan first played for Down as a member of the minor team in 1966. He won an Ulster medal that year following a 1–12 to 1–9 defeat of reigning All-Ireland champions Derry. On 25 September 1966, Down faced Mayo in the All-Ireland final. A goal by J. J. Timoney after 21 minutes gave Mayo a boost and they eventually secured a 1–12 to 1–8 defeat of Down.

On 11 June 1967, Sloan made his senior championship début in a 3–9 to 1-10 Ulster quarter-final defeat of Derry.

Sloan enjoyed his first senior success in 1968. A 2–14 to 2–11 defeat of Kildare gave him a National Football League medal. Later that year, he won his first Ulster medal as Down defeated reigning champions Cavan by 0–16 to 1–8. On 22 September 1968, Down faced Kerry in the All-Ireland final. Seán O'Neill got the inside of his boot to a rebounding ball for a Down goal after just 6 minutes. John Murphy struck for another following confusion in the Kerry goalmouth. Brendan Lynch's goal from a close-in free in the 59th minute came too late as Down secured a 2–12 to 1–13 victory and an All-Ireland medal for Sloan.

In 1971 Sloan won a second Ulster medal following a 4–15 to 4–11 defeat of Derry.

Sloan added a Dr McKenna Cup medal to his collection in 1972 following a 2–13 to 1–6 defeat of Derry.

After losing three successive Ulster finals between 1973 and 1975, Down experienced a resurgence in 1978 as Sloan was in the twilight of his career. A 2–19 to 2–12 defeat of Cavan gave him a third and final Ulster medal. He retired from inter-county football shortly after this victory.

== Honours ==
Down

- All-Ireland Senior Football Championship (1): 1968
- Ulster Senior Football Championship (3): 1968, 1971, 1978
- National Football League (1): 1967-68
- Dr McKenna Cup (1): 1972
- Ulster Minor Football Championship (1): 1966
