= Joe Lennon =

Personal information
- Born: 1934 Poyntzpass, County Down, Northern Ireland
- Died: 23 November 2016 (aged 81) Gormanston, County Meath, Ireland
- Occupation: Secondary school teacher
- Height: 5 ft 11 in (180 cm)

Sport
- Sport: Gaelic football
- Position: Left wing-back
Clubs
- Years: Club
- Aghaderg; St Patrick's Stamullen
Inter-county
- Years: County
- 1954–1970: Down
Inter-county titles
- Ulster titles: 7
- All-Irelands: 3
- NFL: 3

Joseph Finbarr Lennon (1934 – 23 November 2016) was a Gaelic football manager, player and sports broadcaster from Northern Ireland, who featured on The Sunday Game.

== Playing career ==
His league and championship career with the Down senior team spanned seventeen seasons from 1954 to 1970. Lennon captained Down to the All-Ireland title in 1968.

== Honours ==
=== Player ===
Down

- All-Ireland Senior Football Championship (3): 1960, 1961, 1968 (c)
- Ulster Senior Football Championship (7): 1959, 1960, 1961, 1963, 1965, 1966, 1968 (c)
- National Football League (3): 1959–60, 1961–62, 1967–68 (c)

Ulster

- Railway Cup (4): 1960, 1964, 1966, 1968 (c)

Sporting positions
Preceded by	Down Senior Football Captain; 1968	Succeeded by
Achievements
Preceded by Enda Colleran	Railway Cup Football Final winning captain 1968	Succeeded by Noel Tierney
Preceded by Peter Darby	All-Ireland Senior Football Final winning captain 1968	Succeeded by Johnny Culloty
