= John Murphy (Down Gaelic footballer) =

Irish Gaelic footballer, manager, coach, and selector (1948–2020)

Personal information
- Native name: Seán Ó Murchú (Irish)
- Born: 1948 Newry, County Down, Northern Ireland
- Died: 21 May 2020 (aged 72) Newry, County Down, Northern Ireland
- Height: 5 ft 10 in (178 cm)

Sport
- Sport: Gaelic football
- Position: Left wing-forward
Club
- Years: Club
- Newrys Shamrocks
Club titles
- Down titles: 0
Inter-county
- Years: County
- 1966–1975: Down
Inter-county titles
- Ulster titles: 2
- All-Irelands: 1
- NHL: 1
- All Stars: 0

John Murphy (1948 – 21 May 2020) was an Irish Gaelic footballer, manager, coach and selector. His career included All-Ireland Championship victories as a player and later as a coach and selector with the Down senior football team.

== Playing career ==
From the Newry Shamrocks club, Murphy won a MacRory Cup medal with Abbey CBS in 1964, before featuring for the Down minor team at midfield in their All-Ireland final loss to Mayo in 1966. Two years later, as a forward on the Down senior team, Murphy scored a goal in the team's 1968 All-Ireland final victory over Kerry. The team had claimed the 1967-68 National League title earlier in the season. As a player, Murphy also won two Railway Cup medals with Ulster and two Ulster Championship titles.

== Coaching career ==
Alongside Pete McGrath, Murphy was part of the management team that saw Down win All-Ireland Championships in 1991 and 1994. Later he helped guide Mayobridge to three consecutive county senior championships from 2004 to 2006.

== Death ==
Murphy died on 21 May 2020.

== Honours ==
=== Player ===
Abbey CBS

- MacRory Cup (1): 1964

Down

- All-Ireland Senior Football Championship (1): 1968
- Ulster Senior Football Championship (1): 1968, 1971
- National Football League (1): 1967-68
- Ulster Minor Football Championship (1): 1966

Ulster

- Railway Cup (2): 1970, 1971

=== Coach ===
Mayobridge

- Down Senior Football Championship (3): 2004, 2005, 2006

Down

- All-Ireland Senior Football Championship (2): 1991, 1994
- Ulster Senior Football Championship (1): 1991, 1994
