= Kieran Denvir =

Northern Irish Gaelic footballer (1932–2022)

Personal information
- Native name: Ciarán O Doinbhir (Irish)
- Born: January 1932 Kilclief, County Down, Northern Ireland
- Died: 9 August 2022 (aged 90) Kilkeel, County Down, Northern Ireland
- Occupation: Veterinarian

Sport
- Sport: Gaelic football
- Position: Forward, midfield
Clubs
- Years: Club
- Kilclief; Russell Gaelic Union, Downpatrick; Ballina Stephenites; Baltinglass; Greencastle & Kilkeel
Club titles
- Down titles: 2
College
- Years: College
- 1952-1957: University College Dublin
College titles
- Sigerson titles: 4
Inter-county
- Years: County
- 1949–1960: Down
Inter-county titles
- Ulster titles: 2
- All-Irelands: 1
- NFL: 1

Kieran Denvir (Irish: Ciarán O Doinbhir; January 1932 – 9 August 2022) was a Gaelic footballer and hurler from Northern Ireland. He was a member of the Down senior football team from 1952 until 1960. At club level he played with numerous teams, including Kilclief, University College Dublin, Ballina Stephenites, and Greencastle.

== Career ==
Kieran Denvir came from a family steeped in GAA history. His father James was the first county chairman of Down in 1903. His three older sisters Una, Roseleen, and Angela, represented Down in the 1948 All-Ireland Camogie Final against Dublin. His older brother Brian played Gaelic football and hurling for both Down and Ulster before going on to manage the senior football team from 1965-66.

Kieran played Gaelic football at St. Malachy's College in Belfast as a schoolboy. He represented the college in the 1949 McRory Cup final and performances for St Malachy's earned him the honour of being select for the Ulster College team which won a provincial title in 1950. In the same year he was selcted for his county's football and hurling minor teams..

Once he completed his studies at St Malachy's he enrolled as a veterinary student at University College Dublin in 1952. Over the next eight years, he gained prominence in top-class football beyond the county scene, while making his early appearances for Down back home. While playing club football in Dublin, Mayo, and Wicklow his fame became well-established with superb displays as a midfielder or forward.

As a fresher, his selection at right half-forward on the Sigerson team heralded the start of a brilliant six-year Sigerson Cup campaign at UCD. His first success came in 1953 and he went on to play in 6 Sigerson Cup finals (including the 1954 final replay) winning four Sigerson Cup titles, including one as team captain in 1955. In 1956 he won a Dublin senior football Division 1 League title with UCD who competed in the league at that time. In 1955 his brilliant performances for UCD could not be ignored, and he was honoured with selection on the Combined Universities team of 1955 vs Rest of Ireland which also featured Sean Murphy (Kerry), Kevin Heffernan (Dublin), and Sean Purcell (Galway). Further honours followed when he was selected for Ulster in 1955, 1956 and 1958 winning a Railway Cup in 1956.

During his third-level studies he was eligible to play for his home club and in 1955 he won a County Senior Hurling Championship medal for Kilclief playing alongside his older brother Brian. In 1956, Kilclief were unable to field a football team, so he played his club football for Russell Gaelic Union, Downpatrick lining out alongside Derry's Jim McKeever who was living in Downpatrick at the time.

After he finished his studies, his profession took him to Ballina, County Mayo, where he transferred to the Ballina Stephenites club. He competed in both the league and championship, winning a Mayo senior football league title in 1958 and a runners-up medal in the Championship. As a veterinary locum, he subsequently moved on to Baltinglass for a brief spell, helping them win their first football County Championship (although he missed the final), before moving to Kilkeel to set up his own veterinary practice. Here he finished his club career playing football for Greencastle and hurling for Kilkeel, playing until the late 1960s. In 1963 he won a Down Junior Hurling Championship medal with the Kilkeel team.

At inter-county level, Kieran Denvir played football and hurling for the Down minors from 1949-1950. He made his first Senior Football Championship appearance for Down in 1953 alongside Kevin Mussen, Jarlath Carey, PJ McElroy, and George Lavery and was a stalwart of the team for much of the following decade. He was a versatile and very talented player who could play in the wing or corner forward positions as well as midfield J.D. Hickey, Irish Independent, wrote the following in his 1956 article 'GAA Stars in the Making - No.3 Kieran Denvir':..'He is now looked upon as an automatic choice. A determined runner with a fair turn of pace, it is however his splendid ball control and his flair for the unexpected move that sets him apart. His opportunism too is first rate'.

While he played much of his club football outside of Down due to work commitments, he always remained loyal to his native county regularly traveling long distances to represent Down. In addition to representing the county in football, he also played Senior hurling for Down, captaining the hurlers in the 1957 final of the Ulster Hurling Championship.

Following defeat to Derry in the 1958 Ulster final, he won his first Senior football silverware in 1959 when Down claimed the McKenna Cup title, and was a key member in winning their very first Ulster Senior Football Championship title, defeating Cavan 2-16 to 0-7 in Clones. Kieran lined out at corner forward. Further success followed when he won a Lagan Cup and Down's first National League title in 1960, before winning a second successive Ulster medal. His performance in the National League final against Cavan was describe by Mick Dunne, in the Irish Press, 'as more than partially responsible for Down's first League title'. He won a Senior Football All-Ireland medal in 1960, when Down beat Kerry in the 1960 All-Ireland final to claim their first All-Ireland title. Kieran replaced Joe Lennon at midfield in the second half The final was played in front of nearly 88,000 spectators, a record attendance at the time which has only been surpassed by the final of 1961. Two weeks later he drew the curtain on his intercounty career winning the St Brendan's Cup when Down defeated New York in Croke Park. In early 1961 he stepped away from the county panel due to work commitments.

Kieran Denvir worked as a Veterinary Surgeon until his retirement in 1995. He set up a private practice in Kilkeel County Down, from 1959 until 1973, before joining and working for the Department of Agriculture as a vet until his retirement. He married Monica McManamon from Belmullet County Mayo, whom he met when playing football in Ballina.

== Death ==
Kieran Denvir died on 9 August 2022, at the age of 90.

== Honours ==
Club

- Down Senior Hurling Championship: 1955
- Down Junior Hurling Championship: 1963

University College Dublin

- Sigerson Cup: 1953, 1955 (c), 1956, 1957
- Combined Universities GAA 1955

Down

- All-Ireland Senior Football Championship: 1960
- Ulster Senior Football Championship: 1959, 1960
- National Football League: 1959–60
- McKenna Cup: 1959
- Dr Lagan Cup: 1960
- Wembley Tournament 1959, 1960
- St Brendan's Cup 1960

Ulster

- Railway Cup: 1956
