= Tim Lyons =

Irish Gaelic football player

Personal information
- Native name: Tadhg Ó Liatháin (Irish)
- Nickname: Tiger
- Born: 1935 Cordal, County Kerry, Ireland
- Died: 10 July 1984 (aged 49) Tralee, County Kerry, Ireland
- Occupation: Company executive
- Height: 5 ft 11 in (180 cm)

Sport
- Sport: Gaelic football
- Position: Right corner-back
Clubs
- Years: Club
- Cordal; Castleislands Desmonds
College
- Years: College
- 1953-1957: University College Dublin
College titles
- Sigerson titles: 3
Inter-county
Years	County	Apps (scores)
1956–1963	Kerry	24 (0-00)
Inter-county titles
- Munster titles: 6
- All-Irelands: 3
- NFL: 2

Timothy Lyons (1935 – 10 July 1984) was an Irish Gaelic footballer. He played at club level with Cordal and Castleislands Desmonds and at inter-county level with the Kerry senior football team.

== Career ==
Born near Castleisland, County Kerry, Lyons first came to Gaelic football prominence as a schoolboy with St Brendan's College in Killarney when his prowess saw him selected for the Munster Colleges' team in 1952-53. His subsequent studies at University College Dublin resulted in him winning three Sigerson Cup titles, while he also earned inclusion on the Combined Universities team. Lyons first appeared on the inter-county scene with the Kerry minor team in 1953, before making his senior debut in 1956. He was a regular on the team for much of the following decade and won his first All-Ireland Championship title in 1959 before claiming a second winners' medal in 1962. Lyons also won six Munster Championship titles and was involved in two National League title-winning teams.

== Personal life and death ==
Lyons qualified from University College Dublin with a B.Sc.(Ag.) and began his professional career as permanent instructor at Pallaskenry Agricultural College. He later worked with Kerry county committee of agriculture as an adviser for 15 years before taking up the position of Head of Agriculture with Kerry Co-Op in 1973. Lyons died aged 49 at the Bon Secours Hospital in Tralee on 10 July 1984.

== Career statistics ==
Team	Season	National League			Munster		All-Ireland		Total	
Team	Season	Division	Apps	Score	Apps	Score	Apps	Score	Apps	Score
Kerry	1955–56	Division 1	0	0-00	2	0-00	—		2	0-00
Kerry	1956–57	Division 1	5	0-00	1	0-00	—		6	0-00
Kerry	1957–58	Division 1	3	0-00	2	0-00	0	0-00	5	0-00
Kerry	1958–59	Division 1	7	0-00	2	0-00	2	0-00	11	0-00
Kerry	1959–60	Division 1	6	0-00	2	0-00	2	0-00	10	0-00
Kerry	1960–61	Division 1	6	0-00	2	0-00	2	0-00	10	0-00
Kerry	1961–62	Division 1	1	0-00	2	0-00	2	0-00	5	0-00
Kerry	1962–63	Division 1	4	0-00	2	0-00	1	0-00	7	0-00
Kerry	1963-64	Division 1	2	0-00	0	0-00	0	0-00	2	0-00
Career total			34	0-00	15	0-00	9	0-00	58	0-00

== Honours ==
University College Dublin

- Sigerson Cup: 1954, 1956, 1957

Castleisland Desmonds

- Kerry Minor Football Championship: 1952

Kerry

- All-Ireland Senior Football Championship: 1959, 1962
- Munster Senior Football Championship: 1958, 1959, 1960, 1961, 1962, 1963
- National Football League: 1958–59, 1960–61
