= Jarlath =

Jarlath is an Irish given name. Notable persons with this name include:

- Iarlaithe mac Loga or Saint Jarlath (fl. 6th century), Irish priest and scholar, founder of School of Tuam and patron saint of Archdiocese of Tuam
  - St. Jarlath's College, Roman Catholic secondary school for boys in Tuam, County Galway, Ireland
  - St Jarlath's Park, Gaelic Athletic Association stadium in Tuam, County Galway, Ireland
- Jarlath Carey (1932–2006), Northern Ireland Gaelic footballer
- Jarlath Conroy (born 1944), Irish-born actor
- Jarlath McDonagh (born 1945), Irish politician (Fine Gael)
- Jarlath Cloonan (born 1953), former County Galway Senior Hurling Manager
- Jarlath Fallon (born 1973) is a Gaelic footballer
- Jarlath Regan (born 1980), Irish stand-up comedian
- Jarlath Henderson (born 1985), Northern Irish folk musician
- Jarlath Mackey (born 2010), Northern Irish Gaelic footballer
