= 1968 All-Ireland Senior Football Championship =

Football championship

Championship details
- Dates: 21 April – 22 September 1968
- Teams: 31

All-Ireland Champions
- Winning team: Down (3rd win)
- Captain: Joe Lennon
- Manager: Gerry Browne

All-Ireland Finalists
- Losing team: Kerry
- Captain: Pat Griffin
- Manager: Jim Brosnan

Provincial Champions
- Munster: Kerry
- Leinster: Longford
- Ulster: Down
- Connacht: Galway

Championship statistics
- No. matches played: 32
- Top Scorer: Paddy Doherty (1–25)
- Player of the Year: Seán O'Neill

The 1968 All-Ireland Senior Football Championship was the 82nd staging of the All-Ireland Senior Football Championship, the Gaelic Athletic Association's premier inter-county Gaelic football tournament. The championship began on 21 April 1968 and ended on 22 September 1968.

Meath entered the championship as the defending champions, however, they were defeated by Longford in the Leinster semi-final.

On 22 September 1968, Down won the championship following a 2–12 to 1–13 defeat of Kerry in the All-Ireland final. This was their third All-Ireland title and their first in seven championship seasons.

Down's Paddy Doherty was the championship's top scorer with 1–25. His teammate Seán O'Neill was the choice for Texaco Footballer of the Year.

== Results ==
=== Connacht Senior Football Championship ===
Quarter-final

2 June 1968 Quarter-final	Sligo	2–17 – 0–12	Leitrim	Markievicz Park, Sligo
	M Kearins 0–12, B McAuley 2–0, D McHugh 0–2, J Colleary 0–2, M Keane 0–1.		P Dolan 0–4, H O'Carroll 0–4, T Hayes 0–3, M Keane 0–1.	Referee: P Kelly (Dublin)

Semi-finals

16 June 1968 Semi-final	Galway	2–10 – 3–7	Roscommon	MacHale Park, Castlebar
	L Sammon 1–2, S CLeary 1–1, C Dunne 0–4, F Canavan 0–1, J Keenan 0–1, J Duggan 0–1.		J Kane 2–2, J Kelly 1–2, T Whyte 0–1, MJ Keane 0–1, G Geraghty 0–1.	Referee: P Kelly (Dublin)

23 June 1968 Semi-final	Mayo	1–9 – 0–7	Sligo	MacHale Park, Castlebar
	J Corcoran 0–4, M Ruane 1–0, S O'Dowd 0–2, W McGee 0–2, J Nealon 0–1.		M Kearins 0–5, S Davey 0–1, J Henry 0–1.	Referee: P Kelly (Dublin)

14 July 1968 Semi-final replay	Roscommon	1–9 – 2–8	Galway	St. Coman's Park, Roscommon
	J Kelly 1–0, J Keane 0–3, A White 0–3, M Martin 0–2, D Earley 0–1.		S Leydon 1–2, J Kennan 0–5, F Canavan 1–0, C Dunne 0–1.	Referee: J Martin (Tyrone)

Final

21 July 1968 Final	Mayo	2–9 – 2–10	Galway	MacHale Park, Castlebar
	M Ruane 1–1, J Langan 1–0, J Corcoran 0–3, S O'Dowd 0–2, J Farragher 0–1, W McGhee 0–1, J Nealon 0–1.		J Keenan 1–7, M McDonagh 1–0, S Leydon 0–1, C Dunne 0–1, L Sammon 0–1.	Attendance: 30,000; Referee: P Kelly (Dublin)

=== Leinster Senior Football Championship ===
First round

21 April 1968 First round	Carlow	2–9 – 0–10	Wicklow	Geraldine Park, Athy
	B Doyle 2–2, E Walker 0–4, B Hayden 0–2, J Byrne 0–1.		M McNamee 0–3, A Naughton 0–2, G Farrell 0–1, S Doyle 0–1, J Sullivan 0–1, N Scott 0–1, R O'Shea 0–1.	Referee: J Shannon (Dublin)

28 April 1968 First round	Laois	2–12 – 1–9	Wexford	Dr. Cullen Park, Carlow
	J Lalor 0–7, R Miller 1–2, T Dunne 1–0, M Fennell 0–1, S Fleming 0–1, JJ Conwya 0–1.		J Bradley 1–1, Jack Berry 0–4, H Byrne 0–2, A Merrigan 0–1, J Shaughnessy 0–1.	Referee: T McCarthy (Kildare)

Second round

12 May 1968 Second round	Laois	1–12 – 0–7	Carlow	Geraldine Park, Athy
	J Lawlor 0–5, B Lawlor 1–0, JJ Conway 0–3, R Delaney 0–2, P Doyle 0–1, T Walsh 0–1.		E Walker 0–3, B Hayden 0–2, P McNally 0–1, J Byrne 0–1.	Referee: J Dowling (Offaly)

Quarter-finals

2 June 1968 Quarter-final	Longford	1–12 – 0–12	Dublin	O'Connor Park, Tullamore
	M Hopkins 0–5, J Devine 1–1, J Hannify 0–4, V Daly 0–1, S Murray 0–1.		M Whelan 0–4, 0–4, S O'Connor 0–2, P Delaney 0–2, B McDonald 0–2, G Davey 0–1, L Donnelly 0–1.	Referee: M Campbell

9 June 1968 Quarter-final	Offaly	0–11 – 0–6	Louth	Croke Park, Dublin
	P McCormack 0–6, N Clavin 0–2, T McTeague 0–1, A Hickey 0–1, S Grogan 0–1.		B Gaughan 0–3, T Breen 0–1, L Toal 0–1, S Mohan 0–1.	Referee: P Kelly (Dublin)

9 June 1968 Quarter-final	Laois	3–9 – 0–9	Kildare	Dr. Cullen Park, Carlow
	J Lawlor 1–5, M Fennell 1–2, T Dunne 1–0, B Delaney 0–1, JJ Conway 0–1.		J Donnelly 0–6, P Connolly 0–2, T Walsh 0–1.	Referee: J Hatton (Wicklow)

23 June 1968 Quarter-final	Meath	1–11 – 1–7	Westmeath	Croke Park, Dublin
	T Brennan 0–5, O Shanley 1–1, M Kerrigan 0–3, M Mellett 0–1, P Mulvaney 0–1.		D Dolan 1–0, M Carley 0–2, P Buckley 0–2, W Jackson 0–2, P Moran 0–1.	Referee: J Hatton (Wicklow)

Semi-finals

30 June 1968 Semi-final	Offaly	0–6 – 0–11	Laois	O'Connor Park, Tullamore
	S Evans 0–1, T McTeague 0–1, W Bryan 0–1, P McCormack 0–1, J Gunning 0–1, S Grogan 0–1.		T Dunne 0–3, John Lawlor 0–3, JJ Conway 0–2, M Fennell 0–2, B Delaney 0–1.	Attendance: 30,000; Referee: P Hughes (Louth)

7 July 1968 Semi-final	Longford	0–12 – 0–7	Meath	Cusack Park, Mullingar
	M Hopkins 0–4, J Devine 0–3, V Daly 0–2, J Hannify 0–2, T Mulvihill 0–1,		T Brennan 0–4, P Mulvaney 0–2, E Maguire 0–1.	Attendance: 20,000; Referee: J Dowling (Offaly)

Final

21 July 1968 Final	Longford	3–9 – 1–4	Laois	Croke Park, Dublin
	Sean Donnelly 2–1, Jimmy Hannify 1–1, Tom Mulvihill and Jackie Devine (0-2f) 0–2 each, Sean Murray, Mick Hopkins, Pat Burke 0–1 each		Mick Fennell 1–0, John Lawlor 0-2f, Tom Dunne and Brian Delaney 0–1 each	Attendance: 30,000; Referee: John Dowling (Offaly)

=== Munster Senior Football Championship ===
Quarter-finals

12 May 1968 Quarter-final	Waterford	3–5 – 1–15	Clare	Fraher Field, Dungarvan
	T Harty 2–0, M Guiry 1–3, P Walsh 0–1, T O'Riordan 0–1.		M McInerney 0–6, M Moloney 1–2, J Tubridy 0–3, P O'Grady 0–1, P McMahon 0–1, M Begley 0–1, M O'Donoghue 0–1.

19 May 1968 Quarter-final	Tipperary	0–9 – 0–7	Limerick	Seán Treacy Park, Tipperary
	M Keating 0–3, R Strang 0–2, P Blythe 0–2, L Myles 0–1, M Egan 0–1.		M Tynan 0–3, P Murphy 0–1, M Graham 0–1, P O'Dwyer 0–1, B Hartigan 0–1.	Referee: M. Ryan (Kerry)

Semi-finals

16 June 1968 Semi-final	Clare	1–7 – 1–8	Cork	Cusack Park, Ennis
	P McMahon 1–3, M McInerney 0–3, M Chambers 0–1.		C O'Sullivan 0–5, JJ Murphy 1–1, J Carroll 0–1, D Hunt 0–1.	Referee: M. Ryan (Kerry)

23 June 1968 Semi-final	Tipperary	2–7 – 0–17	Kerry	Ned Hall Park, Clonmel
	R Strang 2–2, J Ryan 0–3, M Keating 0–1, P Blythe 0–1.		M O'Dwyer 0–5, P Griffin 0–4, M O'Connell 0–3, B Lynch 0–2, M Fleming 0–2, Donie O'Sullivan 0–1.	Referee: F. Halbert (Cork)

Final

14 July 1968 Final	Kerry	1–21 – 3–8	Cork	Fitzgerald Stadium, Killarney
	M O'Dwyer 0–7, É O'Donoghue 1–1, P Griffin 0–4, B Lynch 0–4, M O'Connell 0–4, T Prendergast 0–1.		C O'Sullivan 1–3, D Hunt 1–0, R Cummins 1–0, JJ Murphy 0–2, J Carroll 0–1, É Ryan 0–1, B O'Neill 0–1.	Referee: J. Dowling (Offaly)

=== Ulster Senior Football Championship ===
Preliminary round

2 June 1968 Preliminary round	Fermanagh	2–8 – 0–8	Tyrone	St. Molise Park, Irvinestown
	G Magee 1–2, E McPartlan 0–4, S McGarritty 1–0, M O'Rourke 0–1, S McGrath 0–1.		C McElduff 0–6, D O'Neill 0–1, J O'Neill 0–1.

Quarter-finals

9 June 1968 Quarter-final	Derry	1–6 – 1–8	Down	Dean McGlinchey Park, Ballinascreen
	S Lagan 1–1, S O'Connell 0–3, B Devlin 0–1, M Niblock 0–1.		S O'Neill 1–3, J Lennon 0–1, M Cole 0–1, J Purdy 0–1, P Rooney 0–1, P Doherty 0–1.	Referee: M Higgins (Cavan)

16 June 1968 Quarter-Final	Cavan	5–9 – 1–11	Antrim	Breffni Park, Cavan
	F McAuley 2–1, C Gallagher 1–4, J O'Donnell 1–2, S Duggan 1–1, P Murray 0–1.		S Burns 1–2, M Green 0–3, H McGill 0–2, R Griffin 0–1, P Lynn 0–1, S McQuillan 0–1, A Scullion 0–1.	Referee: P Devlin (Tyrone)

16 June 1968 Quarter-final	Donegal	2–10 – 1–3	Armagh	MacCumhaill Park, Ballybofey
	D O'Carroll 1–2, M McLoone 1–0, S Granaghan 0–3, PJ Flood 0–1, N Gallagher 0–1, P McShea 0–1, J Quigley 0–1, S Ferriter 0–1.		S Harty 1–0, K McGeough 0–1, J McEntee 0–1, L Kerins 0–1.	Referee: J Martin (Tyrone)

23 June 1968 Quarter-final	Monaghan	1–12 – 2–9	Fermanagh	St. Tiernach's Park, Clones

30 June 1968 Quarter-final replay	Fermanagh	2–5 – 2–12	Monaghan	St. Molise Park, Irvinestown
	J Connolly 1–0, M O'Rourke 1–0, T Treacy 0–2, E McPartland 0–1, S McGrath 0–1, S McGarritty 0–1.		E Tavey 2–1, T McCudden 0–5, S Woods 0–4, B McDonnell 0–1, B Moss 0–1.	Referee: F Tierney (Cavan)

Semi-finals

30 June 1968 Semi-final	Down	2–14 – 0–8	Donegal	Breffni Park, Cavan
	P Doherty 1–6, M Cole 1–2, S O'Neill 0–3, R Murphy 0–2, P Rooney 0–1.		N Gallagher 0–2, J Quigley 0–2, M McLoone 0–2, S Graughan 0–1, J Hannigan 0–1.	Referee: L Maguire (Monaghan)

7 July 1968 Semi-final	Cavan	1–11 – 0–5	Monaghan	St. Tiernach's Park, Clones
	C Gallagher 0–5, J O'Donnell 1–0, P Murray 0–3, M Greenan 0–2, S Duggan 0–1.		T McCudden 0–2, T Loughnan 0–1, J McCabe 0–1, B McDonald 0–1.	Referee: P Devlin (Tyrone)

Final

28 July 1968 Final	Down	0–16 – 1–8	Cavan	Casement Park, Belfast
	P Doherty 0–9, J Murphy 0–2, S O'Neill 0–2, C McAlarney 0–1, J Purdy 0–1, M Cole 0–1.		C Gallagher 1–4, P Murray 0–2, S Duggan 0–1, M Greenan 0–1.	Attendance: 35,000; Referee: M Loftus (Mayo)

=== All-Ireland Senior Football Championship ===
Semi-finals

4 August 1968 Semi-final	Kerry	2–13 – 2–11	Longford	Croke Park, Dublin
	P Griffin 1–4, B Lynch 0–4, D O'Donnell 1–0, DJ Crowley 0–2, M O'Dwyer 0–1, É O'Donoghue 0–1, M O'Connell 0–1.		J Devine 1–4, T Mulvihill 1–2, M Hopkins 0–3, J Hannify 0–2.	Attendance: 34,052; Referee: M Loftus (Mayo)

18 August 1968 Semi-final	Down	2–10 – 2–8	Galway	Croke Park, Dublin
	S O'Neill 1–3, M Cole 1–1, P Doherty 0–4, J Purdy 0–2.		J Keenan 0–6, J Duggan 1–1, C Dunne 1–0, M McDonagh 0–1.	Attendance: 50,965; Referee: P Kelly (Dublin)

Final

22 September 1968 Final	Down	2–12 – 1–13	Kerry	Croke Park, Dublin
	S O'Neill 1–2, P Doherty 0–5, J Murphy 1–0, T O'Hare 0–2, P Rooney 0–2, J Milligan 0–1.		B Lynch 1–2, M O'Dwyer 0–5, P Griffin 0–3, M O'Connell 0–2, DJ Crowley 0–1.	Attendance: 71,294; Referee: M Loftus (Mayo)

== Championship statistics ==
=== Top scorers ===
Overall

Rank	Player	County	Tally	Total	Matches	Average
1	Paddy Doherty	Down	1–25	28	5	5.60
2	John Lalor	Laois	1–22	25	5	5.00
3	Seán O'Neill	Down	3–13	22	5	4.40
4	Charlie Gallagher	Cavan	2–13	19	3	6.33
5	Pat Griffin	Kerry	1–15	18	4	4.50
5	Mick O'Dwyer	Kerry	0–18	18	4	4.50
7	John Keenan	Galway	1–14	17	3	5.66
7	Mickey Kearns	Sligo	0–17	17	2	8.50
9	Jackie Devine	Longford	2–10	16	4	4.00
10	Brendan Lynch	Kerry	1–12	15	4	3.75

Single game

Rank	Player	County	Tally	Total	Opposition
1	Mickey Kearns	Sligo	0–12	12	Leitrim
2	John Keenan	Galway	1–7	10	Mayo
3	Paddy Doherty	Down	1–6	9	Donegal
3	Paddy Doherty	Down	0–9	9	Cavan
5	Dick Strang	Tipperary	2–2	8	Kerry
5	Jim Kane	Roscommon	2–2	8	Galway
5	Brendan Doyle	Carlow	2–2	8	Wicklow
5	John Lalor	Laois	1–5	8	Kildare
9	Seán Donnelly	Longford	2–1	7	Laois
9	Fergus McAuley	Cavan	2–1	7	Antrim
9	Éamon Tavey	Monaghan	2–1	7	Fermanagh
9	Charlie Gallagher	Cavan	1–4	7	Antrim
9	Pat Griffin	Kerry	1–4	7	Longford
9	Jackie Devine	Longford	1–4	7	Kerry
9	Charlie Gallagher	Cavan	1–4	7	Down
9	Mick O'Dwyer	Kerry	0–7	7	Cork
9	John Lalor	Laois	0–7	7	Wexford

=== Miscellaneous ===
- Longford win their first ever Leinster football title.
- The All-Ireland semi-final between Kerry and Longford is the first ever championship meeting between the two teams.

== Roll of Honour ==
- Kerry – 20 (1962)
- Dublin – 17 (1963)
- Galway – 7 (1966)
- Wexford – 5 (1918)
- Cavan – 5 (1952)
- Kildare – 4 (1928)
- Tipperary – 4 (1920)
- Down – 3 (1968)
- Meath – 3 (1967)
- Louth – 3 (1957)
- Mayo – 3 (1951)
- Cork – 3 (1945)
- Roscommon – 2 (1944)
- Limerick – 2 (1896)
