= Necarne =

Castellated gothic house in County Fermanagh, Ireland

Necarne Castle
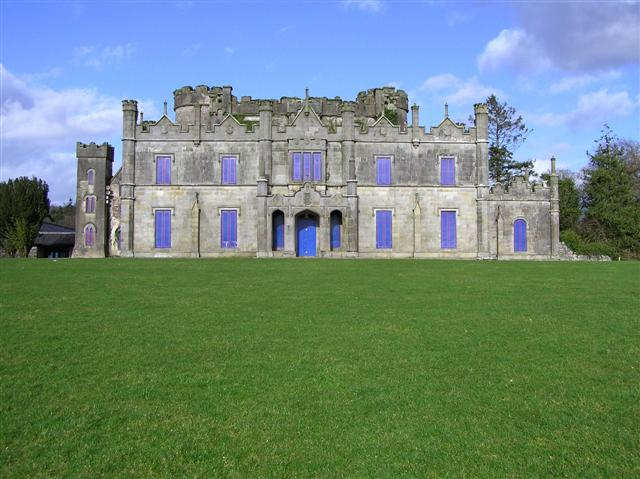
- Interactive map of the Necarne Castle area
- Alternative names: Castle Irvine

General information
- Architectural style: Victorian, Gothic
- Classification: Listed
- Location: Irvinestown, County Fermanagh, Northern Ireland
- Coordinates: 54.464°N 7.635°W
- Groundbreaking: c1619
- Construction started: 1831
- Completed: 1835

Design and construction
- Architect: John Benjamin Keane

Necarne Castle, also known as Castle Irvine, is a Victorian gothic house near Irvinestown in County Fermanagh, Northern Ireland.

The two-storey façade was designed by John Benjamin Keane and was completed in 1835. A castle was originally built on the site around 1619 by a Scottish planter called Gerard Lowther.

In the 1990s the Department of Agriculture, Environment and Rural Affairs signed a 25 year lease on the property to use it as an equine training centre which ran until 2023.

== See also ==
- Castles in Northern Ireland
