= 1987 All-Ireland Minor Football Championship =

Gaelic football competition

Championship details

All-Ireland Champions
- Winning team: Down (2nd win)

All-Ireland Finalists
- Losing team: Cork

Provincial Champions
- Munster: Cork
- Leinster: Kildare
- Ulster: Down
- Connacht: Galway

The 1987 All-Ireland Minor Football Championship was the 56th staging of the All-Ireland Minor Football Championship, the Gaelic Athletic Association's premier inter-county Gaelic football tournament for boys under the age of 18.

Galway entered the championship as defending champions, however, they were defeated by Cork in the All-Ireland semi-final.

On 20 September 1987, Down won the championship following a 1-12 to 1-5 defeat of Cork in the All-Ireland final. This was their second All-Ireland title overall and their first in ten championship seasons.

Future Comedian Patrick Kielty was on the Down team.

== Results ==
=== Connacht Minor Football Championship ===
Semi-Finals

1987 Semi-Final	Galway	1-07 - 0-05	Roscommon	Markievicz Park, Sligo

1987 Semi-Final	Sligo	0-06 - 2-11	Mayo	Dr Hyde Park, Roscommon

Final

12 July 1987 Final	Galway	2-08 - 2-04	Mayo	McHale Park, Castlebar

=== Leinster Minor Football Championship ===
Quarter-Finals

June 1987 Quarter-Final	Kildare	1-08 - 0-10	Offaly	O'Connor Park, Tullamore

June 1987 Quarter-Final	Dublin	2-08 - 2-06	Westmeath	Parnell Park, Dublin

June 1987 Quarter-Final	Laois	1-09 - 1-06	Meath	O'Moore Park, Portlaoise

June 1987 Quarter-Final	Wicklow	1-08 - 1-05	Louth	Aughrim Park, Aughrim

Semi-Finals

June 1987 Semi-Final	Kildare	2-08 - 1-07	Laois	O'Connor Park, Tullamore

June 1987 Semi-Final	Wicklow	1-07 - 0-13	Dublin	St Conleth's Park, Newbridge

Final

26 July 1987 Final	Kildare	0-13 - 2-05	Dublin	Croke Park, Dublin

=== Munster Minor Football Championship ===
Quarter-Finals

May 1987 Quarter-Final	Kerry	2-16 - 0-05	Tipperary	Cappoquin

May 1987 Quarter-Final	Clare	0-07 - 3-09	Tipperary	Páirc na nGael, Askeaton

Semi-Finals

June 1987 Semi-Final	Cork	0-11 - 0-07	Tipperary	Ned Hall Park, Clonmel

June 1987 Semi-Final	Limerick	0-05 - 1-14	Kerry	Moyvane

Finals

26 July 1987 Final	Cork	0-12 - 0-08	Kerry	Páirc Uí Chaoimh, Cork

2 August 1987 Final Replay	Cork	0-12 - 1-08	Kerry	Fitzgerald Stadium, Killarney

=== Ulster Minor Football Championship ===
Preliminary Round

May 1987 Preliminary Round	Cavan	2-06 - 3-01	Armagh

Quarter-Finals

June 1987 Quarter-Final	Down	4-09 - 0-06	Derry	Pairc Esler, Newry

June 1987 Quarter-Final	Tyrone	0-04 - 0-06	Antrim	Casement Park, Belfast

June 1987 Quarter-Final	Donegal	2-05 - 1-08	Armagh	MacCumhaill Park, Ballybofey

June 1987 Quarter-Final Replay	Donegal	3-05 - 2-10	Armagh	Athletic Grounds, Armagh

Semi-Finals

June 1987 Semi-Final	Down	3-05 - 0-03	Cavan	Healy Park, Omagh

June 1987 Semi-Final	Antrim	2-03 - 1-09	Armagh	St. Molaise Park, Irvinestown

Final

19 July 1987 Final	Down	1-07 - 0-04	Armagh	St. Tiernach's Park, Clones

=== All-Ireland Minor Football Championship ===
Semi-Finals

16 August 1987 Semi-Final	Cork	0-10 - 0-07	Galway	Croke Park, Dublin

23 August 1987 Semi-Final	Down	2-11 - 1-09	Kildare	Croke Park, Dublin

Final

20 September 1987 Final	Down	1-12 - 1-05	Cork	Croke Park, Dublin

== Championship statistics ==
=== Miscellaneous ===
- Cork set a new record by becoming the first team to be defeated in three successive All-Ireland finals.
