= Jarlath Carey =

Gaelic football player from Northern Ireland

Personal information
- Native name: Iarlaith Ó Ciardha (Irish)
- Born: 2 June 1932 Ballymartin, County Down
- Died: 4 October 2006 (aged 74) Dundrum, County Down

Sport
- Sport: Gaelic football
- Position: Midfield
Clubs
- Years: Club
- 1950s-1960s: Ballymartin (until 1960) and Dundrum
Club titles
- Down titles: 1
Inter-county
- Years: County
- 1950s-1960s: Down
Inter-county titles
- Ulster titles: 5
- All-Irelands: 2
- NFL: 2

Daniel Jarlath Carey (2 June 1932 – 4 October 2006) was a Northern Irish sportsperson. He played Gaelic football with his local club Dundrum and was a member of the Down senior inter-county team from the 1950s until the 1960s. Carey won back-to-back All-Ireland titles with Down in 1960 and 1961. He later served as a Social Democratic and Labour Party councillor on Down District Council from 1977 to 1981.

== Honours ==
Down

- Ulster Senior Football Championship (5): 1959 1960 1961 1963 1965
- All-Ireland Senior Football Championship (2): 1960 1961
- National Football League (2): 1960 1963
- Dr Lagan Cup (5): 1960 1961 1962 1963 1964
- Dr McKenna Cup (3): 1959 1961 1964

Ballymartin

- Down Senior Football Championship (1): 1955
