= Charlie Gallagher (Gaelic footballer) =

Cavan Gaelic footballer

Personal information
- Native name: Cathal Ó Gallchóir (Irish)
- Born: 25 December 1937 Cootehill, County Cavan, Ireland
- Died: 24 July 1989 (aged 51)
- Occupation: Dental surgeon

Sport
- Sport: Gaelic football
- Position: Full Forward
Club
- Years: Club
- 1953–?: Cootehill Celtic
Club titles
- Cavan titles: 2
Inter-county
Years	County	Apps (scores)
1955–1969	Cavan	47 (10–142)
Inter-county titles
- Ulster titles: 4
- All-Irelands: 0

Charlie Gallagher (25 December 1937 – 24 July 1989) was a Gaelic footballer who played for the Cootehill Celtic club and the Cavan county team.

== Playing career ==
Gallagher regularly topped the nation’s scoring charts in the 1960s. He debut for Cavan in 1955 at the age of 17 years, against Sligo in the National Football League. He won Ulster Senior Football Championship medals in 1962, 1964, 1967 and 1969. He also won an Ulster Junior Football Championship medal in 1962. He was captain of Cavan in 1967 and 1969. He won Railway Cup medals with Ulster in 1964, 1965, 1966 and 1968. He won a Cú Chulainn Award in 1964. His older brother Brian won an All-Ireland medal in 1952.

== Honours ==
Cavan

- Ulster Junior Football Championship (1): 1962
- Ulster Senior Football Championship (4): 1962, 1964, 1967 (c), 1969 (c)

Cootehill Celtic

- Cavan Senior Football Championship (2): 1954, 1955
- Cavan Intermediate Football Championship (1): 1971
- Cavan Junior Football Championship (1): 1969

Ulster

- Railway Cup (4): 1964, 1965, 1966, 1968 (c)

UCD

- Sigerson Cup (1): 1960

St Patrick's College

- MacRory Cup (1): 1955

Individual

- Cú Chulainn Award (1): 1964

== Other honours ==
- Number 94 in The 125 greatest stars of the GAA
- He is seventh in the all-time top Ulster scorers chart with 10–142 (172 points).

== Death ==
He died from drowning near his home in Cootehill, County Cavan, in July 1989.
