= 1982–83 National Football League (Ireland) =

Gaelic football tournament

League details
- Dates: October 1982 – 24 April 1983

League champions
- Winners: Down (4th win)
- Captain: Mark Turley
- Manager: James McCartan

League runners-up
- Runners-up: Armagh
- Captain: Jim McKerr

The 1982–83 National Football League was the 52nd staging of the National Football League (NFL), an annual Gaelic football tournament for the Gaelic Athletic Association county teams of Ireland.

Down defeated Armagh in the final.

== Group stage ==
=== Division One ===
==== Table ====
| Team | Pld | W | D | L | Pts | Notes |
|---|---|---|---|---|---|---|
| Armagh | 7 | 5 | 2 | 0 | 12 | Qualified for Knockout Stages |
| Down | 7 | 4 | 3 | 0 | 11 | Qualified for Knockout Stages |
| Cork | 7 | 4 | 1 | 2 | 9 |
| Dublin | 7 | 3 | 1 | 3 | 7 |
| Kerry | 7 | 3 | 1 | 3 | 7 |
| Offaly | 7 | 3 | 0 | 4 | 6 |
| Derry | 7 | 2 | 0 | 5 | 4 | Relegated to Division Two of the 1983–84 NFL |
| Mayo | 7 | 0 | 0 | 7 | 0 | Relegated to Division Two of the 1983–84 NFL |

=== Division Two ===
==== Play-Off ====
| 30 April 1983 For 6th Place | Cavan | 1-9 — 1-8 | Wicklow | Pairc Tailteann, Navan |
| | | | | Referee: P Kavanagh Meath |

==== Table ====
| Team | Pld | W | D | L | Pts | Notes |
|---|---|---|---|---|---|---|
| Kildare | 7 | 6 | 0 | 1 | 12 | Qualified for Knockout Stages and promoted to Division One of the 1983–84 NFL |
| Meath | 7 | 5 | 1 | 1 | 11 | Qualified for Knockout Stages and promoted to Division One of the 1983–84 NFL |
| Galway | 7 | 4 | 2 | 1 | 10 |
| Roscommon | 7 | 4 | 1 | 2 | 9 |
| Tyrone | 7 | 3 | 0 | 4 | 6 |
| Cavan | 7 | 2 | 0 | 5 | 4 |
| Wicklow | 7 | 2 | 0 | 5 | 4 | Relegated to Division Three of the 1983–84 NFL |
| Antrim | 7 | 0 | 0 | 7 | 0 | Relegated to Division Three of the 1983–84 NFL |

=== Division Three ===
==== Table ====
| Team | Pld | W | D | L | Pts | Notes |
|---|---|---|---|---|---|---|
| Louth | 7 | 6 | 0 | 1 | 12 | Qualified for National League Cup and promoted to Division Two of the 1983–84 NFL |
| Wexford | 7 | 5 | 0 | 2 | 10 | Qualified for National League Cup and promoted to Division Two of the 1983–84 NFL |
| Laois | 7 | 4 | 1 | 2 | 9 |
| Clare | 7 | 4 | 0 | 3 | 8 |
| Donegal | 7 | 3 | 1 | 3 | 7 |
| Monaghan | 7 | 3 | 0 | 4 | 6 |
| Fermanagh | 7 | 2 | 0 | 5 | 4 | Relegated to Division Four of the 1983–84 NFL |
| Longford | 7 | 0 | 0 | 7 | 0 | Relegated to Division Four of the 1983–84 NFL |

=== Division Four ===
==== Table ====
| Team | Pld | W | D | L | Pts | Notes |
|---|---|---|---|---|---|---|
| Westmeath | 7 | 7 | 0 | 0 | 14 | Qualified for National League Cup and promoted to Division Three of the 1983–84 NFL |
| Carlow | 7 | 6 | 0 | 1 | 12 | Qualified for National League Cup and promoted to Division Three of the 1983–84 NFL |
| Leitrim | 7 | 4 | 1 | 2 | 9 |
| Limerick | 7 | 2 | 2 | 3 | 6 |
| Sligo | 7 | 3 | 0 | 4 | 6 |
| Tipperary | 7 | 2 | 1 | 4 | 5 |
| Waterford | 7 | 2 | 0 | 5 | 4 |
| Kilkenny | 7 | 0 | 0 | 7 | 0 |

== Knockout stage ==
=== Semi-finals ===
10 April 1983

| Down | 1-9 – 0-4 | Kildare |

Croke Park, Dublin
Attendance: 15,123

10 April 1983

| Armagh | 2-8 – 1-7 | Meath |

Croke Park, Dublin
Attendance: 15,123

=== Finals ===
24 April 1983
Final

| Down | 1-8 – 0-8 | Armagh |

Croke Park, Dublin
Attendance: 24,500
Referee: Weeshie Fogarty (Kerry)

== National League Cup ==
=== Semi-finals ===
10 April 1983

| Westmeath | 1-8 – 0-5 | Wexford |

Portarlington

10 April 1983

| Louth | 2-10 – 1-5 | Carlow |

Portarlington

=== Final ===
24 April 1983

| Westmeath | 1-08 - 1-07 | Louth |
|---|---|---|
| Tone (0-4), Coyne (1-0), Fahy (0-2f), W. Lowry (0-1), Tynan (0-1) | | O'Kane (1-0), Dawe (0-3f), McDonnell (0-2), McCarragher (0-1), Quinn (0-1) |

Páirc Tailteann, Navan
Referee: P. Kavanagh (Meath)

| GK | 1 | Matt Scally (Athlone) (c) |
| RCB | 2 | Michael McEnroe (Athlone) |
| FB | 3 | Padraic McGowan (Athlone) |
| LCB | 4 | Pat Murray (Moate All-Whites) |
| RHB | 5 | Eddie Tynan (Shandonagh) |
| CHB | 6 | Michael Lowry (St Malachy's) |
| LHB | 7 | Michael Fagan (Mullingar Shamrocks) |
| MF | 8 | Tommy McCormack (Maryland) |
| MF | 9 | Christy Flanagan (Tang) |
| RHF | 10 | Séamus Coyne (Milltownpass) |
| CHF | 11 | Willie Lowry (St Malachy's) |
| LHF | 12 | Rory Fahy (Athlone) |
| RCF | 13 | Pat Brady (St Mary's Rochfortbridge) |
| FF | 14 | Frank Tone (Rosemount) |
| LCF | 15 | Michael Greene (Mullingar Shamrocks) |
Substitutes:
| | 16 | Michael Clarke (Mullingar Shamrocks) for Brady |
| | 17 | Séamus Conroy (The Downs) for Flanagan |

| GK | 1 | Gerry Farrell (Cooley Kickhams) |
| RCB | 2 | Séamus Haughey (Dundalk Young Irelands) |
| FB | 3 | Matt McDermott (St Fechin's) |
| LCB | 4 | Frank Taaffe (Oliver Plunketts) |
| RHB | 5 | Dessie Callaghan (Newtown Blues) |
| CHB | 6 | Aidan Wiseman (Clan na Gael) |
| LHB | 7 | Michael McCabe (Dundalk Young Irelands) |
| MF | 8 | Pat Matthews (Oliver Plunketts) |
| MF | 9 | Paul Reneghan (Geraldines) |
| RHF | 10 | Tony McCarragher (Cooley Kickhams) |
| CHF | 11 | Jimmy McDonnell (Geraldines) (c) |
| LHF | 12 | Benny McKeever (Clan na Gael) |
| RCF | 13 | Ray Quinn (Kilkerley Emmets) |
| FF | 14 | J.P. O'Kane (St Joseph's) |
| LCF | 15 | Kevin Dawe (Dreadnots) |
Substitutes:
| | 16 | Pat McConnon (Dundalk Young Irelands) for Matthews |
