= Ulster GAA =

Provincial council of the Gaelic Athletic Association

- Irish: Ulaidh
- Number of counties: 9
- Province colours: Gold Black
- Major grounds: Casement Park, Belfast; St Tiernach's Park, Clones

Most All-Ireland titles
- Hurling: None
- Football: Down and Cavan (5 each)

Most provincial titles
- Hurling: Antrim (57)
- Football: Cavan (40)

Interprovincial Championship wins
- Hurling: 0
- Football: 28

Standard kit
- Regular kit

Ulster GAA (Irish: Comhairle Uladh) is the administrative body for the Gaelic Athletic Association the traditional Irish province of Ulster, consisting of the six counties of Northern Ireland plus Cavan, Donegal and Monaghan in the Republic of Ireland.

Ulster GAA oversees a range of administrative tasks including the organisation of provincial level competitions such as the annual Ulster Senior Football Championship as well as the Ulster teams which compete in provincial competitions. Headquartered in Armagh City, the current President is Armagh’s Michael Geoghan and the Secretary is Down’s Brian McAvoy.

Ulster GAA is responsible for Gaelic football, hurling and handball in the province, whilst Ladies Gaelic football, camogie and rounders (despite being a GAA sport) are administered by separate bodies.

== Early history ==
The Gaelic Athletic Association was founded in Hayes Hotel in Thurles County Tipperary on 1 November 1884 by Michael Cussack. With the support of patrons such as Land League leaders Charles Stewart Parnell and Michael Davitt, as well as Archbishop Thomas Croke, the association quickly grew, with clubs being established in parishes across Ireland. The first Ulster club to affiliate to the national organisation was Ballyconnell in County Cavan in 1885 and over the next few years clubs and county boards were formed in Cavan, Monaghan, Armagh, Fermanagh and Derry.

The first Ulster Football Championship was held in 1888, which consisted of two games between Red Hand of Monaghan and Moch Finn’s of Cavan. The first game resulted in a draw on 19 August and Red Hand won the subsequent replay on 9 September. No championship was held the following year, but in 1890 Armagh defeated Antrim and then Tyrone to lift their first title. Neither Cavan nor Monaghan entered the competition. In 1891, Cavan regained their title, defeating Armagh after a replay, but this was the last Ulster Championship to be held until 1901.

The early association was beset with problems, owing to a litany of issues including rapid growth, the disapproval of Sunday games in Protestant areas and the distance between Ulster and the GAA’s headquarters in Munster. The association effectively failed to operate with only a handful of clubs operating in the middle of the 1890s.

By 1901, the association saw a revival, coupled with the growth of Conradh na Gaeilge in areas like Belfast. The first Ulster Council was established at a meeting in Armagh in 1903 with Belfast solicitor George Martin elected as the first President and MV O’Nolan (father of writer Flann O’Brien) as Vice-President and 20-year-old Derry draper Louis O’Kane as secretary.

== County boards ==
- Antrim
- Armagh
- Cavan
- Derry
- Donegal
- Down
- Fermanagh
- Monaghan
- Tyrone

== Football ==
=== Provincial team ===
The Ulster provincial football team represents the province of Ulster in Gaelic football. The team competes in the Railway Cup.

==== Players ====
Players from the following county teams represent Ulster: Antrim, Armagh, Derry, Donegal, Down, Fermanagh, Monaghan, Cavan and Tyrone.

=== Competitions ===
==== Inter-county ====
Competition	Year	Champions	Title	Runners-up	Next edition
Ulster Senior Football Championship	2026	Armagh	15th	Monaghan	2027
Dr McKenna Cup	2026	Donegal	12th	Monaghan	2027
Ulster Junior Football Championship	1986	Tyrone	3rd	Monaghan	TBD
Ulster Under-20 Football Championship	2026	Tyrone	18th	Monaghan	2027
Ulster Minor Football Championship	2026	Tyrone	27th	Derry	2027
Dr Lagan Cup	1967	Donegal	4th		TBD

==== Club ====
Competition	Year	Champions	Title	Runners-up	Next edition
Ulster Senior Club Football Championship	2022	Glen	1st	Kilcoo	2023
Ulster Intermediate Club Football Championship	2021	Steelstown	1st	Moortown	2022
Ulster Junior Club Football Championship	2022	Stewartstown Harps	2nd	Drumlane	2023
Ulster Under-21 Club Football Championship					
Ulster Minor Club Football Championship	2019	Lavey	1st	Termon	TBD
Ulster Senior Club Football League	2016	Glenullin	3rd	Coalisland	TBD

==== All-time top scorers from Ulster county teams ====
As of 3 June 2008 according to the BBC.

Rank	Player	County team	Tally	Total score	Championship years
1	Oisín McConville	Armagh	11–197	230	1997–
2	Peter Canavan	Tyrone	9–192	218	1989–2005
3	Paddy Bradley	Derry	13–170	209	2000–2012
4	Paddy Doherty	Down	15–159	204	1954–1971
5	Peter Donohoe	Cavan	17–133	184	1945–1955
6	Seán O'Neill	Down	17–125	176	1959–1975
7	Charlie Gallagher	Cavan	10–142	172	?–?
8	Steven McDonnell	Armagh	15–111	156	2000–
9	Seán O'Connell	Derry	11–118	151	1957–1975
10	Ronan Carolan	Cavan	2–138	144	?–?

Notes

- Includes Ulster Championship, All-Ireland Championship and Qualifiers.

==== All-time top goalscorers from Ulster county teams ====
As of 15 June 2008, according to the Sunday Tribune.

Rank	Player	County team	Number of goals	Championship years
1	Steven McDonnell	Armagh	17	2000–2012
1	Peter Donohoe	Cavan	17	1945–1955
1	Seán O'Neill	Down	17	1959–1975
4	Paddy Doherty	Down	15	1954–1971
5	Paddy Bradley	Derry	13	2000–
5	Ger Houlahan	Armagh	13	1984–2000
5	James McCartan Snr	Down	13	1958–1967
5	Brendan Coulter	Down	13	2000–2015
9	Joe Stafford	Cavan	12	1943–1949
9	Enda Muldoon	Derry	12	1997–
9	Jason Reilly	Cavan	12	1997–
12	Seán O'Connell	Derry	11	1957–1975
12	P. T. Treacy	Fermanagh	11	1960–1973
12	Oisín McConville	Armagh	11	1997–2008

Notes:

- Includes Ulster Championship, All-Ireland Championship and Qualifiers.

== Hurling ==
=== Provincial team ===
The Ulster provincial hurling team represents the province of Ulster in hurling. The team competes in the Railway Cup.

=== Competitions ===
==== Inter-county ====
Competition	Year	Champions	Title	Runners-up	Next edition
Ulster Senior Hurling Championship	2017	Antrim	57th	Down	TBD
Ulster Senior Hurling Shield	2017	Derry	1st	Tyrone	TBD
Conor McGurk Cup	2026	Derry	1st	Donegal	2027
Ulster Intermediate Hurling Championship	1998	Down	4th	London	TBD
Ulster Junior Hurling Championship	2004	Down	8th	Fermanagh	TBD
Ulster Under-21 Hurling Championship	2026	Antrim	39th	Down	2027
Ulster Minor Hurling Championship	2026	Antrim	62nd	Wicklow	2027

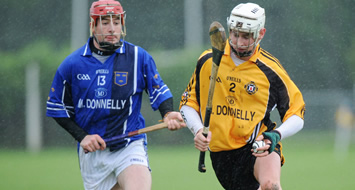
Antrim's Arron Graffin (right) representing Ulster in the 2008 Railway Cup hurling semi-final against Munster

Ulster has always been the weakest of the provinces in hurling terms, possibly due to the difference between the hurling promulgated by the early Gaelic Athletic Association and the "commons" game played in Ulster. The Ulster hurling team have only won four Railway Cup semi-final games in their history (1945, 1992, 1993 and 1995), it, however, lost in each of those Railway Cup deciders.

There have been some successes over the years, mostly by Antrim teams:

- 1943: Antrim defeated Galway and Kilkenny, but lost to Cork in the All-Ireland Senior Hurling Championship final
- 1982: Gerry Goodwin (Tyrone) won the All-Ireland Poc Fada Championship
- 1983: Loughgiel Shamrocks (Antrim) won the All-Ireland Senior Club Hurling Championship
- 1989: Antrim defeated Offaly, and subsequently lost to Tipperary in the All-Ireland final
- 2010: Graham Clarke (Down) won the All-Ireland Poc Fada Championship

==== Club ====
- Ulster Senior Club Hurling Championship
- Ulster Intermediate Club Hurling Championship
- Ulster Junior Club Hurling Championship
- Ulster Under-21 Club Hurling Championship

=== "Team Ulster" in the Liam MacCarthy Cup ===
In 2020, a concept was discussed among players and managers, with a proposal that a combined "Team Ulster" would compete in the Liam MacCarthy Cup.

=== Grades ===
Championship	County team
Senior
Leinster SHC	Antrim
Joe McDonagh Cup	Down
Christy Ring Cup	Derry
Christy Ring Cup	Tyrone
Nicky Rackard Cup	Armagh
Nicky Rackard Cup	Donegal
Nicky Rackard Cup	Fermanagh
Lory Meagher Cup	Cavan
Lory Meagher Cup	Monaghan

== Camogie ==
=== Gael Linn Cup ===
The Ulster camogie team has twice won the premier representative competition in the women's team field sport of camogie, the Gael Linn Cup, in 1967 and 2007.

=== Gael Linn Trophy ===
The Ulster provincial junior camogie team won the Gael Linn Trophy on eight occasions: 1979, 1989, 1990, 1991, 1993, 1998, 2000 and 2002.

== Honours ==
- Disability Sport NI's Inclusive Sport Award: 2021
