= James McCartan Snr =

Down Gaelic footballer (1938–2021)

James McCartan Snr.
Personal information
- Native name: Séamas Mac Artáin Mór (Irish)
- Born: County Down
- Height: 6 ft 0 in (183 cm)

Sport
- Sport: Gaelic football
- Position: Full-forward
Club
- Years: Club
- Glenn
Inter-county
- Years: County
- 1950s–1960s: Down
Inter-county titles
- Ulster titles: 6
- All-Irelands: 2
- NFL: 2

James McCartan (1938 – 14 August 2021) was an Irish Gaelic footballer who played for his local Tullylish club and at senior level for the Down county team from the 1950s until the 1960s.

McCartan played primarily as a forward, and was a major figure in Down's All-Ireland SFC victories of 1960 and 1961. He also won Ulster SFC medals and two National League medals, in 1960 and 1962, while playing for his county team. He was Texaco Footballer of the Year for two consecutive years, in 1960 and 1961.

He won Railway Cup medals while representing Ulster.

Once his playing days came to an end he served as manager of Down during the 1980s when the team won the 1982–83 National Football League.

His son, also called James, won All-Ireland SFC medals while playing for Down in 1991 and 1994; Daniel the Second later managed Down, leading the team to the 2010 All-Ireland Senior Football Championship Final, before returning for a second, shorter, spell as manager in 2021. James the First's younger son Daniel also played for Down, including in the 2010 All-Ireland Senior Football Championship Final.

McCartan later became a greyhound trainer and won the 1978 Irish Cesarewitch with a greyhound called Gullion Lad. He died in August 2021.
