= Kevin Mussen =

Irish Gaelic footballer

Personal information
- Born: Hilltown, County Down

Sport
- Sport: Gaelic football
- Position: Right half-back
Club
- Years: Club
- 1950s-1960s: Clonduff
Club titles
- Down titles: 2
Inter-county
- Years: County
- 1951-1962: Down
Inter-county titles
- Ulster titles: 3
- All-Irelands: 2
- NFL: 2

Kevin Mussen (born 8 October 1933 in Hilltown, County Down) is an Irish retired Gaelic footballer. He played for his local club Clonduff and was a member of the Down senior intercounty team from 1951 until 1962. Mussen played at half-back and captained Down to their first All-Ireland title in 1960, the first time that the Sam Maguire Cup had crossed the border to the North. He was a substitute when Down retained the title in 1961.

Mussen has three Ulster Championship medals. He is twice a winner of: the All-Ireland, National League, the Railway Cup, inter-provincial colleges, the MacRory Cup, the Down Senior Football Championship and Down Senior League. Mussen also won an Antrim Senior Football Championship medal for Rossa while teacher-training in Belfast.

As of June 2025, Mussen confirmed that only five of the Down team that started the 1960 final against Kerry were still alive; even at the age of 92 he was able to name the fifteen players. Mussen recalled that when the Sam Maguire Cup was being carried across the border, after being temporarily brought off the team bus, a Northern Ireland customs officer "messed us around for a little while" before weight of numbers prevailed.

Mussen stated that he had never played against anyone better than Jim McKeever of Derry, whom he knew from St Mary's Training College (the Ranch), and Mick O'Connell of Kerry.

He was married in August 1960, lived in Newcastle where his wife Josie was from and was a teacher in his native Hilltown. His wife died in 2004. They had five children, Grainne, Marcella, Fionnuala, Damien and Adrian.

Sporting positions
Preceded by	Down Senior Football Captain; 1960	Succeeded by Paddy Doherty
Achievements
Preceded by Mick O'Connell (Kerry)	All-Ireland Senior Football winning captain 1960	Succeeded by Paddy Doherty (Down)
