= 1967–68 National Football League (Ireland) =

Gaelic football competition

League details
- Dates: October 1967 – May 1968

League champions
- Winners: Down (3rd win)
- Captain: Joe Lennon

League runners-up
- Runners-up: Kildare
- Captain: Pa Connolly

The 1967–68 National Football League was the 37th staging of the National Football League (NFL), an annual Gaelic football tournament for the Gaelic Athletic Association county teams of Ireland.

Down defeated Kildare in the final.

== Format ==
=== Divisions ===
- Division One: 8 teams. Split into two groups of 4.
- Division Two: 8 teams. Split into two groups of 4.
- Division Three: 8 teams. Split into two groups of 4.
- Division Four: 8 teams. Split into two groups of 4.

The top 2 in each group progressed to the Division Semi-finals and the winners of the Division Finals played off in the NFL semi-finals.

=== Round-robin format ===
Single Round-Robin. Each team played every other team in its division (or group where the division is split) once, either home or away.

Division One (A) was to be played as a double round-robin, but this was abandoned.

=== Points awarded ===
2 points were awarded for a win and 1 for a draw.

=== Titles ===
Teams in all four divisions competed for the National Football League title.

== League Phase Results and Tables ==
=== Division One ===
==== Division One (A) regulation games ====
19 November 1967 Round 2	Antrim	0-7 — 1-15	Meath	Casement Park,

19 November 1967 Round 2	Down	3-10 — 1-5	Louth	Newcastle,

28 January 1968 Round 3	Down	1-10 — 0-13	Meath	Newry,

==== Division One (A) play-offs ====
4 February 1968 For 1st Place	Down	2-10 — 1-8	Meath	Navan

==== Division One (B) regulation games ====
12 November 1967 Round 3	Dublin	1-9 — 0-6	Armagh	Croke Park,

==== Division One inter-group play-offs ====
11 February 1968 Semi-final	Westmeath	3-5 — 4-11	Meath	Croke Park, Dublin

11 February 1968 Semi-final	Down	3-7 — 2-4	Dublin	Croke Park, Dublin

7 April 1968 Final	Down	1-11 — 2-7	Meath	Croke Park, Dublin

==== Division One (A) table ====
Team	Pld	W	D	L	Pts	Status
Down	3	2	1	0	5	Qualified for Knockout Phase
Meath	3	2	1	0	5
Louth	3	1	0	2	2
Antrim	3	0	0	3	0

==== Division One (B) table ====
Team	Pld	W	D	L	Pts	Status
Westmeath	3	3	0	0	6
Dublin	3	2	0	1	4
Armagh	3	1	0	2	2
Monaghan	3	0	0	3	0

=== Division Two ===
==== Division Two (A) play-offs ====
25 February 1968 For 1st Place	Donegal	3-9 — 2-6	Sligo	Irvinestown

==== Division Two (B) play-offs ====
18 February 1968 For 1st Place	Derry	2-11 — 0-12	Cavan	Irvinestown

==== Division Two inter-group play-offs ====
10 March 1968 Semi-final	Sligo	1-13 — 1-12	Derry	Irvinestown

10 March 1968 Semi-final	Cavan	2-7 — 1-9	Donegal	Carrick-on-Shannon

31 March 1968 Final	Sligo	2-8 — 1-7	Cavan	Carrick-on-Shannon

==== Division Two (A) table ====
Team	Pld	W	D	L	Pts	Status
Donegal	3	2	0	1	4
Sligo	3	2	0	1	4	Qualified for Knockout Phase
Fermanagh	3	1	0	2	2
Leitrim	3	1	0	2	2

==== Division Two (B) table ====
Team	Pld	W	D	L	Pts	Status
Derry	3	2	0	1	4
Cavan	3	2	0	1	4
Tyrone	3	1	0	2	2
Longford	3	1	0	2	2

=== Division Three ===
==== Division Three (B) regulation games ====
4 February 1968 Round	Limerick	2-6 — 0-6	Cork	Gaelic Grounds, Limerick

11 February 1968 Round	Cork	3-8 — 2-4	Tipperary	Cork Athletic Grounds

3 March 1968 Round 3	Limerick	2-9 — 0-5	Tipperary	Gaelic Grounds, Limerick

==== Division Three (B) play-offs ====
10 March 1968 For 1st Place	Kerry	3-9 — 1-9	Limerick	Austin Stack Park, Tralee

18 March 1968 For 2nd Place	Cork	3-14 — 2-3	Limerick	Cork Athletic Grounds, Cork

==== Division Three inter-group play-offs ====
24 March 1968 Semi-final	Galway	2-13 — 2-8	Cork	Semple Stadium, Thurles

24 March 1968 Semi-final	Mayo	2-11 — 0-10	Kerry	Semple Stadium, Thurles

7 April 1968 Final	Galway	2-11 — 2-5	Mayo	Tuam
				Attendance: 25,000

==== Division Three (A) table ====
Team	Pld	W	D	L	Pts	Status
Galway	3	3	0	0	6	Qualified for Knockout Phase
Mayo	3	2	0	1	4
Roscommon	3	1	0	2	2
Clare	3	0	0	3	0

==== Division Three (B) table ====
Team	Pld	W	D	L	Pts	Status
Kerry	3	2	0	1	4
Cork	3	2	0	1	4
Limerick	3	2	0	1	4
Tipperary	3	0	0	3	0

=== Division Four ===
==== Division Four (A) regulation games ====
4 February 1968 Round	Offaly	2-18 — 0-4	Carlow	Tullamore,

==== Division Four (B) regulation games ====
19 November 1967 Round	Kildare	1-11 — 2-2	Waterford	Naas,

26 November 1967 Round	Wexford	1-6 — 0-4	Waterford	,

11 February 1968 Round	Wexford	3-5 — 1-3	Kilkenny	Enniscorthy,

==== Division Four inter-group play-offs ====
10 March 1968 Semi-final	Kildare	0-7 — 0-4	Laois	Carlow

10 March 1968 Semi-final	Offaly	1-15 — 0-3	Wexford	Carlow

31 March 1968 Final	Kildare	2-8 — 1-8	Offaly	Croke Park, Dublin

==== Division Four (A) table ====
Team	Pld	W	D	L	Pts	Status
Offaly	3	3	0	0	6
Laois	3	2	0	1	4
Carlow	3	1	0	2	2
Wicklow	3	0	0	3	0

==== Division Four (B) table ====
Team	Pld	W	D	L	Pts	Status
Kildare	3	3	0	0	6	Qualified for Knockout Phase
Wexford	3	2	0	1	4
Waterford	3	1	0	2	2
Kilkenny	3	0	0	3	0

== Knockout Phase Results ==
=== Semi-final ===
28 April 1968

Down	2-10 – 1-8	Galway

Croke Park, Dublin

21 April 1968

Kildare	1-12 – 2-9	Sligo

Croke Park, Dublin

5 May 1968
Replay

Kildare	3-13 – 1-10	Sligo

Croke Park, Dublin

=== Final ===
27 May 1968
Final

Down	2-14 – 2-11	Kildare

Croke Park, Dublin
Attendance: 47,661
Referee: Mick Loftus, Mayo
