= Irvinestown =

Village in County Fermanagh, Northern Ireland

Coordinates: 54.471°N 7.634°W

Irvinestown: Irish: Na Cairn / Baile an Irbhinigh; Scots: Irvinestoun
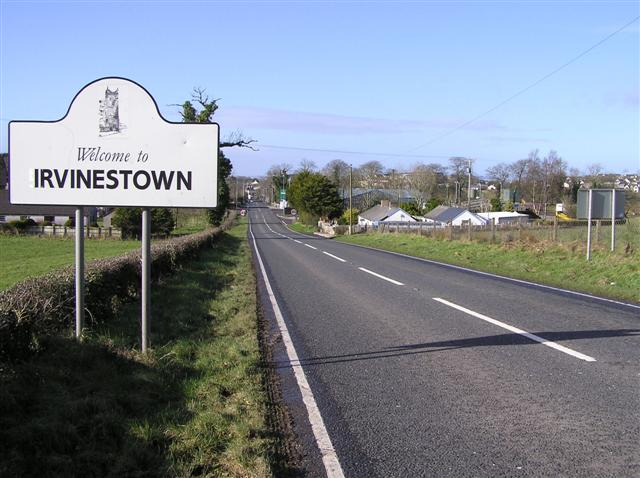
- Entering Irvinestown on the A32 from Dromore

- Location within Northern Ireland
- Population: 2,325 (2021 census)
- Irish grid reference: H235582
- District: Fermanagh and Omagh
- County: County Fermanagh
- Country: Northern Ireland
- Sovereign state: United Kingdom
- Post town: Enniskillen
- Postcode district: BT94
- Dialling code: 02868
- UK Parliament: Fermanagh and South Tyrone
- NI Assembly: Fermanagh and South Tyrone

Irvinestown is a village in counties Fermanagh and Tyrone in Northern Ireland. At the 2021 census, it had a population of 2,325 people. The most notable buildings are Necarne Castle, formerly known as Castle Irvine, and Castle Archdale. Irvinestown is situated within Fermanagh and Omagh district.

== History ==
Before the Plantation of Ulster, the area was known as Necarne or Nakerny; in Irish Na Caorthann (the rowans). The village was founded during the Plantation in 1618 by Sir Gerald Lowther and named Lowtherstown. Ownership later passed to the Irvines of Dumfries and the name changed accordingly.

== Places of interest ==
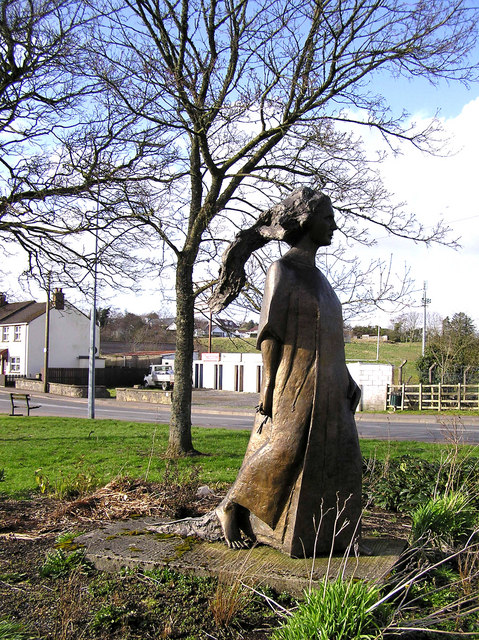
Lady of the Lake monument

- The village boasts the annual Lady of The Lake Festival, a large 10-day summer festival and carnival which begins on the first Friday following 12 July.
- Nearby is Necarne Castle, formerly known as Castle Irvine, which is now an equestrian school – Necarne Castle Equestrian School.
- The nearby Castle Archdale Country Park on the shores of Lower Lough Erne was used as an RAF base for Sunderland flying boats in WWII, with Catalina flying boats at RAF Killadeas, and today provides lakeshore & woodland walking/cycling paths, gardens, caravan park, campsite, tea rooms and boating marina. Other features within the park include a red deer enclosure, wildfowl ponds, nature trail, butterfly garden and wildflower meadow.

== Transport ==
Irvinestown railway station on the Enniskillen and Bundoran Railway was opened on 13 June 1866 and closed on 1 October 1957. Ulsterbus routes 194 (Enniskillen to Pettigo), 83 (Irvinestown to Omagh) and 94A (Enniskillen to Omagh) stop in Irvinestown.

=== Annual truck festival ===
The Irvinestown Truck Festival was launched in 2000 and celebrated 10 years in 2010. This is a 60-mile (100 km) drive around the Fermanagh lakes where the spectacle of trucks raises funds for Marie Curie Cancer Care. The 2010 event took place on the weekend of 23–25 July; the convoy taking place on the 25th. As many as 700 lorries have taken part in this event in the past (unofficially breaking the world record by quite a margin).

== People ==
- Sinéad Quinn, a singer/songwriter who came second in the first series of the BBC's Fame Academy, and has since recorded an album entitled "Ready To Run".

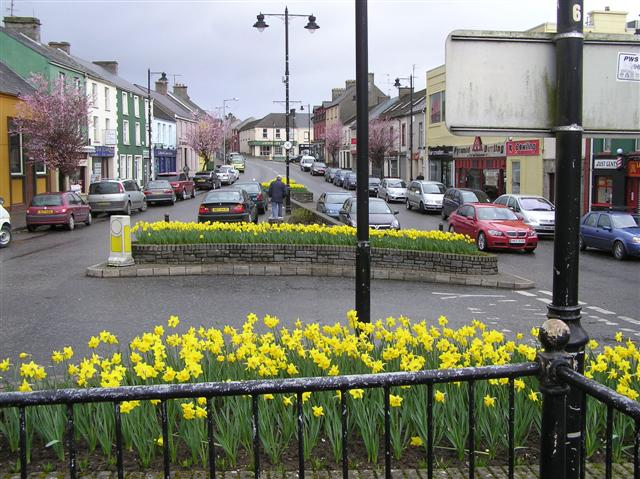
Main Street.

- Andrew Graham, Northern Irish astronomer, orbit computer, and discoverer of the asteroid 9 Metis.

== Sport ==
The village also has a number of sporting organisations such as Irvinestown Wanderers Football Club, St. Molaise's GAA, Irvinestown Tennis Club and more. The Bawnacre leisure centre provides many sporting facilities including squash courts, tennis courts, indoor & outdoor football, indoor gymnasium and sauna / steam room. The area is a rich haven of sport and recreation, a fact recognised when the long-serving manager George Beacom was appointed an O.B.E. for services to sport in the local community.

=== GAA football ===
St. Molaise's GAA Gaelic football team can trace its roots to 1918 when the team was represented at the county convention of that year by C. Browne, P. Rafferty and J. Maguire. Previously hurling was played with teams fielded by Tummery and Glassmullagh.

As the national spirit of the time penetrated local areas, Irvinestown gaels wanted to express their nationality by playing Gaelic Football. The first recorded match was played at a sports day on 15 August against Fintona Pearses at Loughterash, Kilskeery and Fintona won by a 0–5 to 0–3 scoreline. The game was played in Kilskeery because of a ban on G.A.A. activities at the time meant that St. Molaise's home pitch, a field belonging to John Maguire at Drumharvey, was under the watchful eye of three hundred soldiers and R.I.C. who had cycled into the village from early morning suitably equipped for any ensuing trouble.

The troubles of the 1920s disrupted the playing of league games and it was not until 1924 that Tommy Maguire, Jimmy Thompson and Father Lappin made efforts to get the game going again. A hall committee was set up to organise building a hall as a focal point for meetings, fund raising, etc. and St.Molaise Hall was officially opened on 13 September 1925.

In 1924 the old football field at Drumharvey was no longer available so the club moved to a field on the Dromore Road for which they paid £10 a year rent. The cost of admission was 6d but nobody wanted to pay and spectators were content to stand on the road to view the game. Not to be out done the club made a large screen of meal bags sewn together forcing the spectators to come inside. St Molaise Park was officially opened on 11 May 1947. Eighteen months previously a group of men had travelled to see a game in Clones and were impressed with their new field and decided that Irvinestown should have one similar. They selected a site in Bridge Street costing £500 and after tender awarded the contract of preparing the field and surround to J.J. Scallon and Sons. Special trains and buses from all over the North ran into Irvinestown, for the opening which was performed by Mr Daniel O'Rourke T.D., President of the G.A.A. Tummery and Coa pipe bands were there to entertain the 10,000 crowd. The opening match was Lisnaskea vs. West Ulster selection, refereed by Johnny Monaghan, Ederney, followed by Roscommon (All-Ireland finalists 1946) and Antrim (All-Ireland semi finalists 1946) refereed by Jim Vallely, Armagh.

== Demography ==
=== 2021 census ===
The village of Irvinestown encompasses the Erne_North_D Super Data Zone according to the Northern Ireland Statistics and Research Agency. On census day (21 March 2021) there were 2,325 living in Irvinestown. Of these:

- 72.5% were from a Catholic background and 21.1% were from a Protestant or other Christian background.
- 25.4% identified as British, 39.7% identified as Irish and 35.1% identified as Northern Irish (more than one national identity could be chosen).

=== 2011 census ===
On census day (27 March 2011) there were 2,267 living in Irvinestown. Of these,

- 98.72% were from the White Irish (including Irish Traveller) ethnic group.
- 76.49% were from a Catholic background and 20.95% were from a Protestant or other Christian background.
- 29.60% identified as British, 34.72% identified as Irish and 37.49% identified as Northern Irish (more than one national identity could be chosen).

Language breakdown:

- 11.87% knew some Irish
- 3.06% knew some Ulster-Scots
- 3.57% had a language other than English as their first language

=== 2001 census ===
Irvinestown is classified as a village by the NI Statistics and Research Agency (NISRA) (i.e. with population between 1,000 and 2,250 people). On census day (29 April 2001) there were 1,801 people living in Irvinestown. Of these:

- 23.0% were aged under 16 years and 20.7% were aged 60 and over
- 45.5% of the population were male and 54.5% were female
- 75.0% were from a Catholic background and 23.9% were from a Protestant background
- 7.1% of people aged 16–74 were unemployed.

== See also ==
- Market houses in Northern Ireland
