= 1961–62 National Football League (Ireland) =

National Football League(Ireland)_1961--62

League details
- Dates: October 1961 – 13 May 1962

League champions
- Winners: Down (2nd win)
- Captain: Paddy Doherty

League runners-up
- Runners-up: Dublin
- Captain: Kevin Heffernan

The 1961–62 National Football League was the 31st staging of the National Football League (NFL), an annual Gaelic football tournament for the Gaelic Athletic Association county teams of Ireland.

The final featured on the Amharc Éireann newsreel. Seán O'Neill scored a late penalty to win the game.

== Results ==
=== Finals ===
13 May 1962
Final

Down	2-5 – 1-7	Dublin

Croke Park, Dublin
Attendance: 56,515
Referee: M McArdle (Louth)
