= Seán O'Neill =

Irish Gaelic footballer

Personal information
- Native name: Seán Ó Néill (Irish)
- Born: Newry, County Down, Northern Ireland
- Occupation: Solicitor
- Height: 5 ft 9 in (175 cm)

Sport
- Sport: Gaelic football
- Position: Left wing-forward
Club
- Years: Club
- 1950s-1970s: John Mitchel
Club titles
- Down titles: 4
- Ulster titles: 0
- All-Ireland Titles: 0
College titles
- Sigerson titles: 2
Inter-county
Years	County	Apps (scores)
1959-1975	Down	17–125
Inter-county titles
- Ulster titles: 8
- All-Irelands: 3
- NFL: 3
- All Stars: 6

Seán O'Neill (born 1938, Newry) is an Irish retired Gaelic footballer. He played with his local club John Mitchel and was a member of the Down senior inter-county team from the 1950s until the 1960s. O'Neill is one of only four Down players to win three All-Ireland titles.

== Career ==
O'Neill scored 85 goals and over 500 points for Down senior football team in his career, and was a key figure in the county’s All-Ireland victories of 1960, 1961 and 1968. O'Neill's credits include eight Ulster senior football medals and eight Railway Cup medals in 1960, 1963 to 1966, 1968, 1970 and 1971. He won three National League medals, in 1960, 1962 and 1968, as well as six All Star awards. Other honours include a Sigerson Cup medal with the Queen's University of Belfast in 1958, whom he later coached to further wins. He played club football with John Mitchel GFC Newry, winning the Down Senior Football Championship in 1960, 1964, 1967 and 1968. He also won the Down Minor Championship with Newry Mitchels in 1956 - the year the club was formed. His brother Kevin won an all Ireland with down in the 1960s.

Along with Joe Lennon, Dan McCartan and Paddy Doherty, he was one of four Down men who won all three All-Ireland medals in the 1960s.

== Later life ==
O'Neill was the Down minor team coach, winning the 1977 All-Ireland Minor Football Championship.

Sean coached the Queen's University Belfast senior team in the early 1980s. As coach, he won the Sigerson Cup in 1982 and the Ryan Cup in 1984 and 1985.

In 1984, the Gaelic Athletic Association centenary year, he was honoured by being named on their Football Team of the Century. In 2000 he was again honoured by the GAA by being named on their Gaelic Football Team of the Millennium.

O'Neill is a solicitor by profession.

== Honours ==
- Railway Cup (8) 1960 1963 1964 1965 1966 1968 1970 1971
- Ulster Senior Football Championship (8) 1959 1960 1961 1963 1965 1966 1968 1971
- Dr Lagan Cup (5) 1960 1961 1962 1963 1964
- Dr McKenna Cup (4) 1959 1961 1964 1972
- Cú Chulainn Awards (4) 1963 1964 1965 1967
- Down Senior Football Championship (4) 1960 1964 1967 1968
- All-Ireland Senior Football Championship (3) 1960 1961 1968
- National Football League Division 1 (3) 1960 1962 1968
- GAA GPA All Stars Awards (2) 1971 1972
- Sigerson Cup (2) 1958 1964
- Down Division 1 Football League (2) 1965 1968
- Texaco Footballer of the Year (1) 1968

Manager

- Ulster Minor Football Championship (2) 1977 1979
- All-Ireland Minor Football Championship (1) 1977
