= Paddy Doherty (Gaelic footballer) =

Irish Gaelic footballer (1934–2026)

Personal information
- Native name: Páidí Ó Dochartaigh (Irish)
- Nickname: Mo
- Born: 1934 Ballykinlar, County Down, Northern Ireland
- Died: 9 September 2026 (aged 92) Northern Ireland
- Occupation: Bricklayer

Sport
- Sport: Gaelic football
- Position: Left wing-forward
Clubs
- Years: Club
- 1950s-1960s: Ballykinlar and Loughinisland
Club titles
- Down titles: 0
- Ulster titles: Ulster
Inter-county
- Years: County
- 1954-1971: Down
Inter-county titles
- Ulster titles: 7
- All-Irelands: 3
- NFL: 3

Patrick Doherty (1934 – 9 September 2026) was an Irish sportsman. Born in Ballykinlar, County Down, he played Gaelic football with his local club Ballykinlar and was a member of the Down senior inter-county team from the 1950s until the 1960s. Doherty captained Down to the All-Ireland title in 1961.

== Sexual assault allegations and trial of the facts ==
On 10 May 2024, Doherty was found to have committed the act of sexual assault on eight counts at Downpatrick Crown Court after a trial of the facts. The assaults on four young women took place between 1981 and 1986.

== Death ==
Doherty died on 9 September 2026, at the age of 92.

== Honours ==
- 7 Ulster Senior Football Championships (1959 1960 1961 1963 1965 1966 1968)
- 3 All-Ireland Senior Football Championships (1960 1961 1968)
- 3 National Football League Division 1s (1960 1962 1968)
- 3 Down Junior Football Championships (1936 1941 1945)
- 2 Down Division 1 Football Leagues (1961 1962)

Sporting positions
Preceded by Kevin Mussen	Down Senior Football Captain; 1961	Succeeded by
Achievements
Preceded by Kevin Mussen (Down)	All-Ireland Senior Football winning captain 1961	Succeeded by Seán Óg Sheehy (Kerry)
