= Down county football team =

Gaelic football team

Down
- Sport: Football
- Irish: An Dún
- Nickname(s): The Mournemen
- County board: Down GAA
- Manager: Conor Laverty
- Captain: Pierce Laverty
- Home venue(s): Páirc Esler, Newry

Recent competitive record
- Current All-Ireland status: Ulster (SF) in 2026
- Last championship title: 1994
- Current NFL Division: 2 (1st in 2026 Division 3)
- Last league title: 2026
First colours	Second colours

The Down county football team represents Down GAA, the county board of the Gaelic Athletic Association, in the Gaelic sport of football. The team competes in three major annual inter-county competitions; the All-Ireland Senior Football Championship, the Ulster Senior Football Championship and the National Football League.

Down's home ground is Páirc Esler, Newry. The team's manager is Conor Laverty.

The team last won the Ulster Senior Championship in 1994, the All-Ireland Senior Championship in 1994 and the National League in 2026.

With just one loss in six appearances in All-Ireland SFC finals, Down has a reputation for rising to the big occasion. Kitted out in distinctive red and black, the team's massive fan base has been responsible for some of the largest match attendances in GAA history. Although, since the last decade of the twentieth century, the team has had a barren patch at senior level, despite various successes at underage level, in 2010 Down showed signs of improving by gaining promotion to the National Football League Division One and reaching the All-Ireland Senior Football final — narrowly losing by one point to Cork.

== History ==
=== 1950s–1960s ===
Down was not regarded as a football stronghold when Queen's University won the 1958 Sigerson Cup, and some of its leading players turned their thoughts to Down's county team dilemma.

Down won the 1959 Ulster Senior Football Championship (SFC) title with six inter-changeable forwards who introduced off-the-ball running and oddities such as track-suits.

In 1960, two goals in a three-minute period from James McCartan and Paddy Doherty helped Down to defeat Kerry, who were almost completely unbeaten at the time, and which brought to an end the Kerry football regime for a few years.

In 1961, Down defeated Offaly by one point in a game that featured five first half goals. In that three-year period their supporters surpassed every attendance record in the book. When Down played Offaly in 1961 they set a record attendance of 90,556 for a GAA game, one that due to stadium redevelopments and fire code regulations is not likely to be broken. Against Dublin in the 1964 National League final a record crowd of 70,125 attended. The 71,573 who watched Down play Kerry in 1961 was at the time a record for an All-Ireland SFC semi-final. In 1968, Down defeated Kerry with Sean O'Neill and John Murphy goals, again in a two-minute spell. Despite a famous prediction that Down would go on to win three-in-a-row, the county took twenty years to regain its status.

=== 1990s ===
In 1991, Down surprised favourites Meath, Barry Breen scoring the goal that sent his team into a lead of eleven points with twenty minutes to go, a lead that Meath could not match. In 1994, Mickey Linden sent James McCartan in for a goal directly under Hill 16, a goal which silenced Dublin and helped Down claim its fifth All-Ireland SFC title.

No other team from Ulster won an All-Ireland SFC until Armagh won the 2002 All-Ireland Senior Football Championship Final.

=== 2000s–present ===
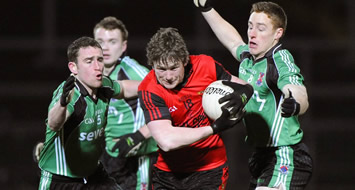
Down (red) in action against Queen's University Belfast in the 2009 Dr McKenna Cup

In 2008, Down defeated Tyrone after a replay in the Ulster SFC but lost to Armagh in the Ulster SFC semi-final. Down advanced to play Offaly in the All-Ireland SFC qualifiers. After a convincing 5–19 to 2–10 victory over Offaly, Down faced Laois in a Round 2 qualifier. Defeating Laois by a single point, and with Dan Gordon being sent off, Down progressed to the last round of the qualifiers, in which the team was paired with Wexford, a game held at Croke Park. Down had Dan Gordon's suspension removed, but awful conditions and a poor Down performance resulted in a defeat to Wexford by a scoreline of 2–13 to 0–12.

Down reached the 2010 All-Ireland SFC Final after a narrow win over Kildare in the semi-final. However, Down lost to Cork in that game, the first time Down experienced defeat in an All-Ireland SFC final. Cork trailed by three points at half-time but improved in the second half and won by a scoreline of 0–16 to 0–15. Down captain Benny Coulter's effort on 70 minutes and a fisted Daniel Hughes effort one minute into added time left one point between the teams. That was the way it stayed, as Cork collected its seventh All-Ireland SFC crown in front of a crowd of 81,604.

In 2019, Down won the U20 Leo Murphy Cup Football Development League, defeating Cavan in the final by a scoreline of 1–14 to 0–11.

Under new manager Conor Laverty Down have experienced a rebirth in the 2020s. The county won the 2024 Tailteann Cup, a national competition for lower-level teams, which comes with the prize of an automatic berth in the next season's All-Ireland series; that same year saw them win Division 3 of the National League. 2025 would see Down relegated back to Division 3 of the League on score difference, advance to the semi-final of the Ulster Championship only to lose to eventual Ulster champions and All-Ireland finalists Donegal, and earn a home preliminary quarter-final in the All-Ireland series where they would drop a tight game to Galway, the previous year's All-Ireland runners-up. 2026 was another season of peaks and valleys; despite again winning Division 3 of the National League and beating Donegal away in the provincials, a 28-point drubbing by Armagh in the Ulster semi-final meant that Down would have to rely on other results to make the All-Ireland series based on their league position. Upsets elsewhere meant that they would enter the 2026 Tailteann Cup; eventually making the final, Down surged to a 12-point halftime lead over Wicklow but collapsed in the second half to lose by two.

== Style of play ==
Down teams through the years have played with great emphasis on attack, often leading to the neglect of the defence. This system has cost Down teams of the twenty-first century, with the introduction of more negative tactics to quell forward lines, with a massive emphasis on blanket defence.

== Panel ==
Team as per Down vs Galway in the 2025 All-Ireland Senior Football Championship#Preliminary quarter-finals, 22 July 2025

No.	Player	Position	Club
1	Ronan Burns	Goalkeeper	Drumgath
2	Patrick McCarthy	Right corner-back	Burren
3	Peter Fegan	Full-back	Burren
4	Ceilum Doherty	Left corner-back	Kilcoo
5	Ryan Magill	Right half-back	Burren
6	Pierce Laverty (c)	Centre-back	Saul
7	Miceal Rooney	Left half-back	Kilcoo
8	Daniel Guinness	Midfield	Carryduff
9	Ryan McEvoy	Midfield	Kilcoo
10	Danny Magill	Right half-forward	Burren
11	Odhran Murdock	Centre-forward	Burren
21	Adam Crimmins	Left half-forward	Mayobridge
13	James Guinness	Right corner-forward	Carryduff
14	Pat Havern	Full-forward	Saval
15	John McGeough	Left corner-forward	Carryduff

No.	Player	Position	Club
16	John O'Hare	Substitute	Glenn
12	Eugene Branagan	Substitute	Kilcoo
17	Ruairí McCormack	Substitute	Warrenpoint
18	Aaron McClements	Substitute	Loughinisland
19	Donal Scullion	Substitute	Clann na Banna
20	Eoin McCrickard	Substitute	Liatroim Fontenoys
22	Oisín Savage	Substitute	Loughinisland
23	Caolan Mooney	Substitute	Downpatrick
24	Finn Murdock	Substitute	Rostrevor
25	Patrick Brooks	Substitute	Glenn
26	Conor McCrickard	Substitute	Liatroim Fontenoys

== Management team ==
- Manager: Conor Laverty, appointed 8 August 2022
- Backroom team: Martin Clarke, Declan Morgan, Micky Donnelly and Ciaran Meenagh.

== Managerial history ==
As late as 2012, Down had a history of not appointing "foreign" managers, though Martin Breheny suggested Down might be the most likely from the cohort of football teams that traditionally appointed a manager from inside to ask for "outside help". Since then, the county has recruited Jim McCorry and Paddy Tally from outside.

Dates	Name	Origin
1989–2002	Pete McGrath	Rostrevor
2002–2006	Paddy O'Rourke	Burren
2006–2009	Ross Carr	Clonduff
2009–2014	James McCartan Jnr	Burren
2014–2015	Jim McCorry	
2015–2018	Éamonn Burns	Bryansford
2018–2021	Paddy Tally	
2021–2022	James McCartan Jnr (2)	Burren
2022–	Conor Laverty	Kilcoo

== Players ==
=== Records ===
- Seán O'Neill – Down's only representative on the Gaelic Football Team of the Millennium
- Kevin Mussen – from the Clonduff club, the first Down man to lift the Sam Maguire Cup in 1960
- Paddy Doherty – All-Ireland SFC winning captain 1961
- Joe Lennon – All-Ireland SFC winning captain 1968
- Patsy O'Hagan – All-Ireland SFC winner (1960 and 1961) and selector for 1968 All-Ireland SFC winning team
- Paddy O'Rourke – All-Ireland SFC winning captain 1991 and former Down senior football manager
- James McCartan Jnr – All-Ireland SFC winner in 1991 and 1994, All Star (1990 and 1994), managed Queen's University to the 2007 Sigerson Cup.
- D. J. Kane – All-Ireland SFC winning captain 1994 and former assistant county manager with Down.
- Ambrose Rogers – from the Longstone club, was captain in 2010 but was injured before the All-Ireland SFC Final
- Benny Coulter – half-forward and Ireland international, All Star (2010)
- Dan Gordon – midfielder from the Loughinisland Club, captain of the Down senior team in 2007–08. In 2010, Gordon played in defence.
- Brendan McVeigh – An Ríocht, All-Ireland SFC winner and All Star in 2010. Down GAA First Division winner 2007. Only Down goalkeeper to have won an All Star.
- Martin Clarke – An Ríocht, won an All-Ireland MFC medal in 2005 and an All Star in 2010, in between which played for AFL club Collingwood Magpies.
- Patrick Kielty – comedian, All-Ireland MFC winning team 1987
- Kevin McKernan – All-Ireland Minor Championship 2005, Ulster Under-21 winner 2008
- Kieran Denvir - Only Down player to win 4 Sigerson Cups. All-Ireland SFC winner 1960

== Honours ==
Official honours, with additions noted.

=== National ===
Down (in red jerseys) take on Laois during the 2024 Tailteann Cup final

- All-Ireland Senior Football Championship
  - (gold) Winners (5): 1960, 1961, 1968, 1991, 1994
  - (silver) Runners-up (1): 2010
- Tailteann Cup
  - (gold) Winners (1): 2024
  - (silver) Runners-up (2): 2023, 2026
- National Football League
  - (gold) Winners (4): 1959–60, 1961–62, 1967–68, 1982–83
  - (silver) Runners-up (4): 1962–63, 1963–64, 1969–70, 1989–90
- National Football League Division 3
  - (gold) Winners (1): 2026
- All-Ireland Junior Football Championship
  - (gold) Winners (1): 1946
- All-Ireland Under-21 Football Championship
  - (gold) Winners (1): 1979
- Leo Murphy Cup - U20 Football Development League
  - (gold) Winners (1): 2019
- All-Ireland Minor Football Championship
  - (gold) Winners (4): 1977, 1987, 1999, 2005

=== Provincial ===
- Ulster Senior Football Championship
  - (gold) Winners (12): 1959, 1960, 1961, 1963, 1965, 1966, 1968, 1971, 1978, 1981, 1991, 1994
  - (silver) Runners-up (15): 1940, 1942, 1958, 1962, 1967, 1969, 1973, 1974, 1975, 1986, 1996, 1999, 2003, 2012, 2017
- Ulster Junior Football Championship
  - (gold) Winners (9): 1931, 1934, 1946, 1947, 1949, 1958, 1965, 1966, 1971
- Dr McKenna Cup:
  - (gold) Winners (11): 1944, 1959, 1961, 1964, 1972, 1987, 1989, 1992, 1996, 1998, 2008
- Dr Lagan Cup
  - (gold) Winners (6): 1949, 1960, 1961, 1962, 1963, 1964
- Ulster Under-21 Football Championship
  - (gold) Winners (9): 1965, 1977, 1978, 1979, 1984, 1985, 2005, 2008, 2009
- Ulster Under-20 Football Championship
  - (gold) Winners (2): 2021, 2023
- Ulster Minor Football Championship
  - (gold) Winners (10): 1958, 1960, 1962, 1963, 1966, 1977, 1979, 1986, 1987, 1999
