= 1959–60 National Football League (Ireland) =

Gaelic football competition

League details
- Dates: October 1959 – 8 May 1960

League champions
- Winners: Down (1st win)
- Captain: Kevin Mussen

League runners-up
- Runners-up: Cavan
- Captain: Tom Maguire

The 1959–60 National Football League was the 29th staging of the National Football League (NFL), an annual Gaelic football tournament for the Gaelic Athletic Association county teams of Ireland.

The first all-Ulster final attracted a record crowd for a League final and was won by Down.

== Group stage ==
=== Division I (Dr Lagan Cup) ===
==== Play-offs ====
28 February 1960 Semi-final	Down	1-9 — 0-9	Armagh	Casement Park, Belfast
				Referee: M. McArdle Louth

6 March 1960 Semi-final	Derry	2-9 — 0-3	Monaghan	O'Neill Park, Dungannon
				Attendance: 5,000; Referee: M. McArdle Louth

13 March 1960 Final	Down	2-10 — 0-3	Derry	Casement Park, Belfast

==== Group A ====
Team	Pld	W	D	L	Pts	Status
Derry	3	3	0	0	6
Armagh	3	2	0	1	4
Fermanagh	3	1	0	2	2
Donegal	3	0	0	3	0

==== Group B ====
Team	Pld	W	D	L	Pts	Status
Down	3	3	0	0	6	Advance to knockout phase
Monaghan	3	2	0	1	4
Tyrone	3	1	0	2	2
Antrim	3	0	0	3	0

=== Division II ===
==== Table ====
Team	Pld	W	D	L	Pts	Status
Cavan	6	6	0	0	12	Advance to knockout phase
Westmeath	6	5	0	1	10
Leitrim	3	3	0	3	6
Mayo	6	3	0	3	6
Longford	6	2	0	4	4
Meath	6	2	0	4	4
Sligo	6	0	0	6	0

=== Division III ===
==== Table ====
Team	Pld	W	D	L	Pts	Status
Dublin	6	6	0	0	12	Advance to knockout phase
Offaly	6	5	0	1	10
Galway	6	4	0	2	8
Roscommon	6	2	1	3	5
Louth	6	2	1	3	5
Laois	6	1	0	5	2
Wicklow	6	0	0	6	0

=== Division IV ===
==== Group A play-off ====
13 March 1960 For 1st Place	Kerry	1-12 — 0-6	Cork	Fitzgerald Stadium, Killarney

==== Final ====
26 March 1960 Final	Kerry	2-6 — 0-5	Clare	Gaelic Grounds, Limerick

==== Group A ====
Team	Pld	W	D	L	Pts	Status
Kerry	4	3	1	0	7	Advance to knockout phase
Cork	4	3	1	0	7
Kildare	4	2	0	2	4
Carlow	4	1	0	3	2
Wexford	4	0	0	4	0

==== Group B ====
Team	Pld	W	D	L	Pts	Status
Clare	4	4	0	0	8
Tipperary	4	2	0	2	4
Limerick	4	2	0	2	4
Waterford	4	1	1	2	3
Kilkenny	4	0	1	3	1

== Knockout stage ==
=== Semi-final ===
9 April 1960

Down	2-10 – 2-8	Kerry

Croke Park, Dublin

23 April 1960

Cavan	2-8 – 1-8	Dublin

Croke Park, Dublin

=== Final ===
8 May 1960
Final

Down	0-12 – 0-9	Cavan

Croke Park, Dublin
Attendance: 49,451
Referee: John Mulvey (Mayo)
