= Dr Lagan Cup =

- Irish: Corn an Dochtúra Uí Lagáin
- Code: Football
- Founded: 1937
- Abolished: 1967
- Region: Ulster (GAA)
- No. of teams: 5–7
- Last Title holders: Donegal (6th title)
- First winner: Tyrone
- Most titles: Down; Donegal (6 titles)

The Dr Lagan Cup (also called the Ulster Football League or the Four Counties League, Five Counties League), was an inter-county Gaelic football competition in the province of Ulster. The competition was discontinued in 1967. The Lagan Cup was the trophy for a Senior Football League, which at the time was limited to seven Ulster counties, unlike the Dr McKenna Cup, which is a knockout competition that includes all nine of Ulster's counties; Cavan and Fermanagh did not usually take part.

It was first held in 1937, and the trophy was donated by Dr. Felix Lagan of Omagh, a nationalist and promoter of Gaelic games. The competition functioned in several years as the Northern Division of the National Football League. It was typically played as a round-robin with either a single game or two games between each team, and no final. It was last played in 1967; the original trophy is kept at the Cardinal Tomás Ó Fiaich Memorial Library and Archive in Armagh.

Frankie Donnelly holds the record for the highest individual scoring tally in an inter-county match, with 4-11 for Tyrone against Fermanagh in the 1957 Dr Lagan Cup.

== Top winners ==
| # | Team | Wins | Years won |
|---|---|---|---|
| 1 | Down | 6 | 1949, 1960, 1961, 1962, 1963, 1964 |
| 1 | Donegal | 6 | 1936–37, 1937, 1952, 1965, 1966, 1967 |
| 3 | Derry | 5 | 1945, 1947, 1950, 1953, 1959 |
| 4 | Antrim | 4 | 1941, 1944, 1946, 1948 |
| 5 | Tyrone | 3 | 1943, 1957, 1958 |
| 5 | Armagh | 3 | 1954, 1955, 1956 |
| 7 | Monaghan | 1 | 1951 |

== See also ==
- Dr McKenna Cup
