= 1960 All-Ireland Senior Football Championship =

Football championship

Championship details
- Dates: 1 May – 25 September 1960
- Teams: 30

All-Ireland Champions
- Winning team: Down (1st win)
- Captain: Kevin Mussen
- Manager: B. Carr

All-Ireland Finalists
- Losing team: Kerry
- Captain: Paudie Sheehy

Provincial Champions
- Munster: Kerry
- Leinster: Offaly
- Ulster: Down
- Connacht: Galway

Championship statistics
- No. matches played: 31
- Player of the Year: James McCartan Sr.

The 1960 All-Ireland Football Championship was the 74th staging of the All-Ireland Senior Football Championship, the Gaelic Athletic Association's premier inter-county Gaelic football tournament. The championship began on 1 May 1960 and ended on 25 September 1960.

Fermanagh back in the Ulster championship for the first time since 1948.

Kerry entered the championship as the defending champions.

On 25 September 1960, Down won the championship following a 2–10 to 0–8 defeat of Kerry in the All-Ireland final. This was their first All-Ireland title.

Down's James McCartan Sr. was the choice for Texaco Footballer of the Year.

== Results ==
=== Connacht Senior Football Championship ===
Quarter-final

12 June 1960 Quarter-final	Mayo	1–6 – 2–5	Galway	McHale Park, Castlebar
	B McLoughlin (0–2); T Treacy (1–1), M Ruane (0–1), T O’Boyle (0–2).			Attendance: 11,370

Semi-finals

19 June 1960 Semi-final	Leitrim	2–8 – 1–6	Roscommon	Markievicz Park, Sligo
				Attendance: 4,000

26 June 1960 Semi-final	Galway	1–8 – 1–3	Sligo	Tuam Stadium, Tuam
				Attendance: 5,000

Final

10 July 1960 Final	Galway	2–5 – 0–5	Leitrim	Markievicz Park, Sligo
				Attendance: 7,500

=== Leinster Senior Football Championship ===
First round

1 May 1960 First round	Kildare	1–9 – 2–3	Wexford	Dr. Cullen Park, Carlow
	E.Treacy 2–0, K.O'Malley 0–4, P.Maguire 0–2, F.Gibbons, M.Geraghty 0–1

1 May 1960 First round	Longford	2–12 – 2–9	Meath	Cusack Park, Mullingar

8 May 1960 First round	Westmeath	2–10 – 1–11	Laois	O'Connor Park, Tullamore

Quarter-finals

15 May 1960 Quarter-final	Offaly	2–12 – 2–09	Carlow	St. Conleth's Park, Newbridge
				Attendance: 11,000; Referee: B Kavanagh

22 May 1960 Quarter-final	Louth	1–10 – 1–05	Wicklow	Croke Park, Dublin
				Attendance: 10,590

29 May 1960 Quarter-final	Dublin	10–13 – 3–08	Longford	Cusack Park, Mullingar
	Johnny Joyce 5–3, Kevin Heffernan 2–1, Des Ferguson 1–2, Paddy Farnan 1–1, John Timmons 0–4, Maurice Whelan and Simon Behan 0–1 each, Billy Morgan 1–0 o.g.		Noel Dodd and Roger Martin 1–2 each, Larry Gillen 1–0, Bobby Burns 0–2, J Harold and M Molloy 0–1 each	Attendance: 11,199; Referee: J. Dowling (Offaly)

5 June 1960 Quarter-final	Kildare	2–08 – 2–09	Westmeath	O'Connor Park, Tullamore
	J.Hayden 1–1, B.Keogh, E.Treacy 0–3, P.Grainger, P.Tyrell 0–1			Attendance: 12,000

Semi-finals

26 June 1960 Semi-final	Offaly	3–09 – 0–09	Dublin	O'Moore Park, Portlaoise
				Attendance: 18,000; Referee: J Kavanagh (Kildare)

3 July 1960 Semi-final	Louth	1–08 – 1–01	Westmeath	Páirc Tailteann, Navan
				Attendance: 17,238

==== Final ====
(Croke Park, Dublin)

31 July 1960

Offaly	0–10 – 1–06	Louth
(HT: 0–03 – 1–04)
Pts: Harry Donnelly (0-6f), Donie Hanlon (0–2), Seán Brereton (0–1), Mick Casey (0–1)		Gls: Kevin Beahan (pen); Pts: Kevin Beahan (0-3, 1f), Tony O'Rourke (0-1), Jackie Reynolds (0-1, Jimmy McDonnell 0-1)

Referee: Brian Smyth (Meath)
Attendance: 35,264

GK	1	Willie Nolan (Clara)
RCB	2	Paddy McCormack (Rhode)
FB	3	Greg Hughes (Cloghan)
LCB	4	John Egan (Doon)
RHB	5	Phil O'Reilly (Tullamore)
CHB	6	Mick Brady (Edenderry)
LHB	7	Seán Ryan (St Monica's, London)
MF	8	Seán Foran (Edenderry)
MF	9	Charlie Wrenn (Air Corps, Dublin)
RHF	10	Donie Hanlon (Gracefield) (c)
CHF	11	Seán Brereton (Bracknagh)
LHF	12	Tommy Greene (Daingean)
RCF	13	Mick Casey (Rhode)
FF	14	Peter Carey (Daingean)
LCF	15	Harry Donnelly (Air Corps, Dublin)
Substitutes:

GK	1	Seán Óg Flood (Dundalk Young Irelands)
RCB	2	Ollie Reilly (Hunterstown Rovers)
FB	3	George Carroll (Oliver Plunketts)
LCB	4	Jim Meehan (Naomh Mhuire)
RHB	5	Patsy Coleman (St Mary's)
CHB	6	Jim McArdle (Roche Emmets)
LHB	7	Stephen White (Dundalk Young Irelands)
MF	8	John McArdle (Clan na Gael) (c)
MF	9	Frank Lynch (Geraldines)
RHF	10	John Woods (Cooley Kickhams)
CHF	11	Kevin Beahan (St Mary's)
LHF	12	Tony O'Rourke (St Mary's)
RCF	13	Paddy Geraghty (Mattock Rangers)
FF	14	Jackie Reynolds (Oliver Plunketts)
LCF	15	Jimmy McDonnell (Darver Volunteers)
Substitutes:
	16	Jim Duffy (Dundalk Gaels) for Geraghty
	17	Mickey Gartlan (Roche Emmets) for John McArdle

=== Munster Senior Football Championship ===
Quarter-final

29 May 1960 Quarter-final	Clare	1–6 – 1–8	Tipperary	Gaelic Grounds, Limerick
				Referee: P Silke (Limerick)

Semi-finals

10 July 1960 Semi-final	Tipperary	0–3 – 0–11	Kerry	Ned Hall Park, Clonmel
			K. Coffey 0–2, M. O'Connell 0–1, D. McAuliffe 0–1, T. Long. 0–1, P. Sheehy 0–4, J. Dowling, 0–2.	Referee: A. Carroll (CIare)

10 July 1960 Semi-final	Waterford	1–9 – 0–11	Cork	Castle Grounds, Lismore
			C. O’Sullivan (0–1), N. Fitzgerald (0–1), E. McCarthy (0–8) & J. O’Sullivan (0–1).	Referee: D O Connell (Tipperary)

Final

24 July 1960 Final	Kerry	3–15 – 0–8	Waterford	Cork Athletic Grounds, Cork
	Paudie Sheehy 1–4 (1–0 pen, 0-4f), Tom Long 1–2, Seamus Murphy 0–4, Mick O'Connell 0–3 (0-1f), John Dowling 1–0, Jer D. O'Connor and Dave Geaney 0–1 each		Tom McGrath 0–4 (0-2f), Justin Spratt 0–2, Monty Guiry and Albie Richards 0–1	Attendance: 8,100; Referee: A Carroll (Clare)

=== Ulster Senior Football Championship ===
Preliminary round

5 June 1960 Preliminary round	Cavan	1–10 – 1–0	Donegal	Breffni Park, Cavan
				Attendance: 4,000

Quarter-finals

5 June 1960 Quarter-final	Derry	3–10 – 1–9	Armagh	Rossa Park, Magherafelt
				Attendance: 6,000

12 June 1960 Quarter-final	Antrim	1–4 – 0–14	Down	Casement Park, Belfast
				Attendance: 5,000

19 June 1960 Quarter-final	Fermanagh	2–7 – 3–4	Cavan	St. Molaise Park, Irvinestown

26 June 1960 Quarter-final replay	Cavan	3–9 – 2–2	Fermanagh	Breffni Park, Cavan
				Attendance: 6,000

26 June 1960 Quarter-final	Tyrone	3–6 – 3–11	Monaghan	O'Neill Park, Dungannon

Semi-finals

10 July 1960 Semi-final	Down	2–11 – 0–7	Monaghan	O'Neill Park, Dungannon

17 July 1960 Semi-final	Cavan	3–6 – 0–5	Derry	Casement Park, Belfast
				Attendance: 8,000

Final

31 July 1960 Final	Down	3–7 – 1–8	Cavan	St. Tiernach's Park, Clones
				Attendance: 33,000

=== All-Ireland Senior Football Championship ===
Semi-finals

7 August 1960 Semi-final	Kerry	1–8 – 0–8	Galway	Croke Park, Dublin
	T. Long 0–1, P. Sheehy 0–1, G. McMahon 1–0, J. Dowling 0–1, T. Lyne 0–5.			Attendance: 37,128

14 August 1960 Semi-final	Down	1–10 – 2–7	Offaly	Croke Park, Dublin
				Attendance: 64,232; Referee: T Cunningham (Waterford)

11 September 1960 Semi-final replay	Down	1–7 – 1–5	Offaly	Croke Park, Dublin
				Attendance: 68,023; Referee: M McArdle (Louth)

Final

25 September 1960 Final	Down	2–10 – 0–8	Kerry	Croke Park, Dublin
	P. Doherty 1–5, J. McCartan 1–1, T. Hadden 0–2, J. Lennon & S. O'Neill 0–1.		M. O'Connell 0–2, J.D. O'Connor 0–1, S. Murphy 0–1, T. Lyne 0–4.	Attendance: 87,768; Referee: John Dowling (0ffaly)

== Championship statistics ==
=== Miscellaneous ===
- Kildare played Westmeath in the Leinster football championship for the first time since 1931.
- Fermanagh back in the Ulster football championship for the first time since 1948.
- The Dublin vs Longford game set a new record for highest score in senior football championship history (60pts). It has been equalled in 1979 (Kerry v Clare) & 2015 (Mayo v Sligo).
- Waterford beat Cork for the first time since 1919.
- Offaly win their first Leinster title.
- Down win their first All Ireland title and become the second team from Ulster after Cavan back in 1933 to win the All Ireland and the first from Northern Ireland.
- The attendance of 87,768 at the All-Ireland final between Down and Kerry sets a new official record.

=== Scorers ===
Overall

Rank	Player	County	Tally	Total	Matches	Average

Single game

Rank	Player	County	Tally	Total	Opposition
