= 1961 All-Ireland Senior Football Championship =

Football championship

Championship details
- Dates: April 30 – September 24, 1961
- Teams: 31

All-Ireland Champions
- Winning team: Down (2nd win)
- Captain: Paddy Doherty
- Manager: B. Carr

All-Ireland Finalists
- Losing team: Offaly
- Captain: Willie Nolan
- Manager: Peter O'Reilly

Provincial Champions
- Munster: Kerry
- Leinster: Offaly
- Ulster: Down
- Connacht: Roscommon

Championship statistics
- No. matches played: 32

The 1961 All-Ireland Senior Football Championship was the 75th staging of All-Ireland Senior Football Championship, the Gaelic Athletic Association's premier inter-county Gaelic football tournament. The championship began on 30 April 1961 and ended on 24 September 1961.

Kilkenny return to the Leinster championship for the first time since 1944. The Leinster final in Portlaoise was the last to date not played at Croke Park.

Down won their second All-Ireland in a row.

== Results ==
=== Connacht Senior Football Championship ===
11 June 1961
Quarter-final

Galway	0–10 – 0–6	Mayo
		F O’Leary (0–1), M Ruane (0–2); T Treacy (0–1), T O’Boyle (0–1). Sub: J Langan (0–1).

Tuam Stadium, Tuam
Attendance: 10,000
Referee: J. Martin (Roscommon)

18 June 1961
Semi-final

Roscommon	2–9 – 2–6	Sligo

Fr. O'Hara Park, Charlestown
Attendance: 6,000
Referee: Patsy Geraghty (Galway)

25 June 1961
Semi-final

Leitrim	2–9 – 4–11	Galway

Seán O'Heslin Memorial Park, Ballinamore
Attendance: 4,000

9 July 1961
Final

Roscommon	1–11 – 2–7	Galway

McHale Park, Castlebar
Attendance: 19,876
Referee: A. Carroll (Clare)

=== Leinster Senior Football Championship ===
30 April 1961
Preliminary round

Wexford	2–11 – 0–11	Wicklow

Dr. Cullen Park, Carlow
Referee: F. Long (Carlow)

7 May 1961
Preliminary round

Kildare	3–8 – 3–4	Kilkenny
P.Tyrell 2–4, Paddy Moore 1–0, P.Cummins 0–2, P.Connolly, F.Gibbons 0–1

St. Conleth's Park, Newbridge

7 May 1961
Preliminary round

Longford	3–10 – 0–8	Westmeath

O'Connor Park, Tullamore

14 May 1961
Preliminary round

Carlow	3-11– 3–9	Laois

Geraldine Park, Athy

21 May 1961
Quarter-final

Longford	0–8 – 1–6	Meath

Croke Park, Dublin

28 May 1961
Quarter-final

Kildare	4–7 – 2–5	Louth
F.Gibbons 3–2, P.Tyrell 1–1, P.Cummins 0–2, J.Redpath, J.Cummins 0–1

Croke Park, Dublin

4 June 1961
Quarter-final

Dublin	4–7 – 0–7	Wexford

Dr. Cullen Park, Carlow

11 June 1961
Quarter-final

Offaly	0–17 – 2–6	Carlow

St. Conleth's Park, Newbridge
Attendance: 20,000
Referee: J Kavanagh (Kildare)

2 July 1961
Semi-final

Offaly	3–9 – 0–6	Kildare
		P.Tyrell, J.J.Walsh 0–2, J.Redpath, P.Cummins 0–1

O'Moore Park, Portlaoise
Referee: E Moules (Wicklow)

9 July 1961
Semi-final

Dublin	4–14 – 1–7	Meath

Páirc Tailteann, Navan
Attendance: 23,271

23 July 1961
Final

Offaly	1–13 – 1–8	Dublin
Har Donnelly 0–6 (0-4f), Mick Casey 1–2, Donie O'Hanlon 0–5 (0-1f)		John Timmons 0–5 (0-4f), Mickey Whelan 1–1, Paddy Farnan and Kevin Heffernan 0–1 each

O'Moore Park, Portlaoise
Attendance: 26,836
Referee: J Kavanagh (Kildare)

=== Munster Senior Football Championship ===
14 May 1961
Quarter-final

Waterford	1–7 – 3–13	Tipperary

Fraher Field, Dungarvan
Referee: D. O'Donovan (C)

18 June 1961
Semi-final

Cork	2–9 – 2–4	Tipperary
C. O'Sullivan (0–1), S .O'Sullivan (0–1), E. McCarthy (0–4), J. O'Sullivan (1–1), V, Barrett (0–2) & M. Burke (1–0).

Páirc MacGearailt, Fermoy
Attendance: 5,000
Referee: L. Crotty (W)

25 June 1961
Semi-final

Kerry	1–13 – 1–0	Clare
T Long (0–2), D Geaney (0–4), G McMahon (1–1), J Burke(0–1) T, Burke (0–5)

Newcastlewest

16 July 1961
Final

Kerry	0–10 – 1–7	Cork
Mick O'Connell 0–3 (0-1f), Dan McAuliffe 0-2f, Mick O'Dwyer, Seamus Murphy, Tom Long, Dave Geaney, Gary Clifford 0–1 each		Joe O'Sullivan 1–2, Gene McCarthy (0-1f) and Vincent Barrett (0-1f) 0–2 eachm Con Sullivan 0–1

Cork Athletic Grounds, Cork
Attendance: 17,500
Referee: A Carroll (Clare)

23 July 1961
Final replay

Kerry	2–13 – 1–4	Cork
Dan McAuliffe 0–7 (0-5f), Gary Clifford 1–1, Brian Sheehy 1–0, John Dowling 0–3, Mick O'Dwyer and Tim O'Sullivan 0–1 each		Gene McCarthy 1–2 (0-1f) and George White 0–2

Fitzgerald Stadium, Killarney
Attendance: 27,852
Referee: A Carroll (Clare)

=== Ulster Senior Football Championship ===
28 May 1961
Preliminary round

Derry	2–10 – 0–4	Donegal

MacCumhaill Park, Ballybofey

4 June 1961
Quarter-final

Armagh	2–7 – 0–8	Cavan

The Playing Fields, Lurgan

4 June 1961
Quarter-final

Monaghan	1–10 – 0–6	Antrim

St. Mary's Park, Castleblayney
Attendance: 4,000

11 June 1961
Quarter-final

Down	0–12 – 0–7	Fermanagh

Pairc Esler, Newry

11 June 1961
Quarter-final

Derry	1–9 – 0–10	Tyrone

Dean McGlinchey Park, Ballinascreen
Attendance: 4,000

25 June 1961
Semi-final

Armagh	5–9 – 0–5	Monaghan

O'Neill Park, Dungannon
Attendance: 6,000

2 July 1961
Semi-final

Down	2–12 – 1–10	Derry

Casement Park, Belfast
Attendance: 18,000

23 July 1961
Final

Down	2–10 – 1–10	Armagh

Casement Park, Belfast
Attendance: 38,500

=== All-Ireland Senior Football Championship ===
6 August 1961
Semi-final

Down	1–12 – 0–9	Kerry
		M O'Dwyer (0–2), D McAuliffe (0–1), T O'Sullivan (0–3), T Dowd (0–1).

Croke Park, Dublin
Attendance: 64,112

20 August 1961
Semi-final

Offaly	3–6 – 0–6	Roscommon

Croke Park, Dublin
Attendance: 71,573
Referee: L Maguire (Cavan)

24 September 1961
Final

Down	3–6 – 2–8	Offaly
J. McCartan, S. O'Neill 1–1, B. Morgan 1–0, P. Doherty & T. Hadden 0–2.		M. Casey, P. Daly 1–0, H. Donnelly 0–6, Ti Cullen & S. Brereton 0–1.

Croke Park, Dublin
Attendance: 90,556
Referee: L Maguire (Cavan)

== Championship statistics ==
=== Scorers ===
Overall

Rank	Player	County	Tally	Total	Matches	Average

Single game

Rank	Player	County	Tally	Total	Opposition

=== Miscellaneous ===
- Seán O'Heslin Memorial Park, Ballinamore played host to Connacht semi-final between Galway vs Leitrim.
- The Kildare-Kilkenny game was the first Leinster championship game Kilkenny played since 1944 as they decided to rejoin it.
- Navan hosted Dublin vs Meath meeting for the last time until 1980 all in between fixtures were played at Croke Park, Dublin.
- The first ever Ulster final between Armagh vs Down.
- The Leinster final between Offaly vs Dublin was the last Leinster final to date not played at Croke Park, Dublin when it was held at O'Moore Park, Portlaoise with the attendance of 26,826.
- The All Ireland semi-final Offaly vs Roscommon was their first championship meeting.
- Offaly reach their first All Ireland final but were beaten narrowly by Down won it for the second year in a row also were the last team to win a triple of Ulster titles until Armagh (2004–2006) with the attendance of 90,556.
