= 1959 All-Ireland Senior Football Championship =

Football championship

Championship details
- Dates: April 26 – September 27, 1959
- Teams: 29

All-Ireland Champions
- Winning team: Kerry (19th win)
- Captain: Mick O'Connell

All-Ireland Finalists
- Losing team: Galway
- Captain: Seán Purcell
- Manager: John "Tull" Dunne

Provincial Champions
- Munster: Kerry
- Leinster: Dublin
- Ulster: Down
- Connacht: Galway

Championship statistics
- No. matches played: 33

The 1959 All-Ireland Senior Football Championship was the 73rd staging of Ireland's premier Gaelic football knock-out competition.

In the All Ireland semi-final Kerry ended Dublin period as All Ireland champions that won in 1958.

Kerry were the winners.

== Results ==
=== Connacht Senior Football Championship ===
21 June 1959
Quarter-Final

Mayo	3–8 – 1–8	Sligo
J McAndrew (0–1), J Fleming (1–2), M Ruane (0–2), M Stewart (0–2, one free); J Corcoran (0–1), J O’Connell (1–0), T Rochford (1–0).

Markievicz Park, Sligo

21 June 1959
Semi-Final

Galway	0–12 – 0–4	Roscommon

Pearse Stadium, Galway
Attendance: 12,000

28 June 1959
Semi-Final

Mayo	2–4 – 0–10	Leitrim
B McLoughlin (0–1), F O’Leary; J Fleming (0–1), M Ruane (1–0), M Stewart (0–1); J Corcoran (0–1), J O’Connell (1–0).

McHale Park, Castlebar
Attendance: 8,000

12 July 1959
Semi-Final Replay

Mayo	2–5 – 2–7	Leitrim
J McAndrew (0–2, a free and a ’50’), I McCaffrey (1–0), E Moriarty (0–2, one free), M Stewart and Sub: P Solan (1–1).

St. Coman's Park, Roscommon
Attendance: 10,000

9 August 1959
Final

Galway	5–8 – 0–12	Leitrim

Markievicz Park, Sligo
Attendance: 18,000

=== Leinster Senior Football Championship ===
26 April 1959
Preliminary round

Laois	0–11 – 0–5	Wicklow

Geraldine Park, Athy

3 May 1959
Preliminary round

Longford	4–3 – 0–10	Westmeath

Cusack Park, Mullingar

10 May 1959
Preliminary round

Carlow	1–12 – 1–3	Wexford

St. Patrick's Park, Enniscorthy

17 May 1959
Quarter-Final

Offaly	1–9 – 2–6	Laois

O'Moore Park, Portlaoise
Attendance: 8000
Referee: M Mangan (Dublin)

24 May 1959
Quarter-Final

Dublin	1–11 – 2–4	Carlow

O'Moore Park, Portlaoise
Attendance: 10,818

31 May 1959
Quarter-Final

Longford	2–7 – 1–5	Meath

Cusack Park, Mullingar

7 June 1959
Quarter-Final Replay

Offaly	0–10 – 3–8	Laois

O'Connor Park, Tullamore
Referee: T Million

21 June 1959
Quarter-Final

Louth	1–13 – 3–6	Kildare
		K.O'Malley 1–4, P.Loughlin 1–1, E.Treacy 1–0, P.Wright 0–1

Croke Park, Dublin

28 June 1959
Semi-Final

Longford	0–8 – 2–9	Laois

O'Connor Park, Tullamore
Attendance: 15,058
Referee: B. Smith (Meath)

5 July 1959
Semi-Final

Dublin	1–8 – 0–11	Louth

Páirc Tailteann, Navan
Attendance: 24,567
Referee: J. Dowling (Offaly)

26 July 1959
Semi-Final Replay

Dublin	3–14 – 1–9	Louth

Páirc Tailteann, Navan
Attendance: 37,11
Referee: J. Fitzgearld (Limerick)

2 August 1959
Final

Dublin	1–18 – 2–8	Laois
Ollie Freaney 1–7 (0-6f), Micky Whelan 0–3, Des Foley and Kevin Heffernan (0-1f) 0–2 each Cathal O'Leary, Johnny Joyce, Padraig Haughey, Paddy Farnan 0–1 each		Mick Phelan 2–0, Jack Kenna 0–5 (0-3f), Sean Brennan, Noel Delaney, Sean Price 0–1 each

O'Connor Park, Tullamore
Attendance: 24,006
Referee: John Dowling (Offaly)

=== Munster Senior Football Championship ===
31 May 1959
Quarter-Final

Tipperary	2–6 – 1–7	Waterford

Ned Hall Park, Clonmel
Referee: A. Scannell ( C )

17 May 1959
Semi-Final

Cork	4–9 – 1–7	Clare
G. White (1–2), E. McCarthy (0–2), F. McCarthy (0–1), T. Furlong (1–0), J. O’Sullivan & V. Barrett (1–2).

Cusack Park, Ennis

5 July 1959
Semi-Final

Kerry	1–15 – 1–2	Tipperary
M. O'Connell (0–3), S. Murphy Camp (0–2), D. McAuliffe (1–4), T. Long (0–1), P. Sheehy (0–1), J. Dowling (0–2), J Brosnan (0–2).

Fitzgerald Stadium, Killarney
Referee: T. Crowley ( C )

2 August 1959
Final

Kerry	2–15 – 2–8	Cork
Dan McAuliffe 0-7f, Paudie Sheehy and David Geaney 1–1 each, Jim Brosnan 0–2, Mick O'Connell (1 '50), Seamus Murphy, Tom Long, John Dowling 0–1 each		Joe O'Sullivan 1–2, Tom Furlong 1–1, Eric Ryan (0-1f) and E McCarthy (1 '50) 0–2 each, Hugo Casey 0–1

Fitzgerald Stadium, Killarney
Attendance: 26,184
Referee: Tom Cunningham (Waterford)

=== Ulster Senior Football Championship ===
31 May 1959
Quarter-Final

Derry	0–5 – 1–6	Armagh

The Playing Fields, Lurgan
Attendance: 5,000

7 June 1959
Quarter-Final

Cavan	2–9 – 0–4	Donegal

MacCumhaill Park, Ballybofey
Attendance: 4,000

14 June 1959
Quarter-Final

Down	4–9 – 1–3	Antrim

St. Patrick's Park, Newcastle
Attendance: 4,500

21 June 1959
Quarter-Final

Tyrone	1–9 – 0–7	Monaghan

St. Mary's Park, Castleblayney
Attendance: 6,000

5 July 1959
Semi-Final

Cavan	0–13 – 2–7	Armagh

St. Mary's Park, Castleblayney
Attendance: 8,000

12 July 1959
Semi-Final

Down	1–6 – 1–6	Tyrone

Casement Park, Belfast
Attendance: 12,000

21 July 1959
Semi-Final Replay

Cavan	1–9 – 1–7	Armagh

St Tiernach's Park, Clones
Attendance: 15,000

28 July 1959
Semi-Final Replay

Down	1–12 – 0–4	Tyrone

Casement Park, Belfast
Attendance: 16,000

9 August 1959
Final

Down	2–16 – 0–7	Cavan

St Tiernach's Park, Clones
Attendance: 30,000

=== All-Ireland Senior Football Championship ===
16 August 1959
Semi-Final

Kerry	1–10 – 2–5	Dublin
M. O'Connell (0–2), D. McAuliffe (1–4), T. Long (0–1), P. Sheehy (0–3).

Croke Park, Dublin
Attendance: 70,148

23 August 1959
Semi-Final

Galway	1–11 – 1–4	Down

Croke Park, Dublin
Attendance: 62,688

27 September 1959
Final

Kerry	3–7 – 1–4	Galway
Mick O'Dwyer (0–1), Dan McAuliffe (2–2), John Dowling (0–2), Tadhgie Lyne (0–2).		Sean Purcell (0–3), Frank Evers (1–0) & Joe Young (0–1).

Croke Park, Dublin
Attendance: 85,897
Referee: J. Dowling (Offaly)

== Championship statistics ==
=== Miscellaneous ===
- Leitrim record their first ever win over Mayo after a replay.
- Both Ulster semi-finals ended in a draw and went to a replay.
- Down win the Ulster title for the first time.
- The All Ireland semi-final between Galway and Down was their first championship meeting between them.
