= 2010 Down county football team season =

Down county football team
2010 season
- Manager: James McCartan Jnr
- Stadium: Pairc Esler, Newry
- NFL D2: 1st (runner-up)
- All-Ireland SFC: Runner-up
- Ulster Championship: Semi-finalist
- Dr McKenna Cup: Semi-finalist

The following is a summary of Down county football team's 2010 season.

== Kits ==
Home	Away

== Squad ==
Ambrose Rogers	Danny Hughes	Ronan Murtagh
Aidan Carr	Darren O'Hagan	Kalum King
Benny Coulter	Declan Rooney	Kevin Duffin
Brendan McArdle	Gerard McCartan	Kevin McKernan
Brendan McVeigh	James Colgan	Mark Doran
Conor Garvey	John Clarke	Declan Alder
Conor Maginn	Mark Poland	
Damien Rafferty	Martin Clarke	
Dan Gordon	Paul McComiskey	
Daniel McCartan	Peter Fitzpatrick	

== Competitions ==
Win Draw Loss

=== Dr McKenna Cup ===
==== Results ====
Date	Opponents	H / A	Result F – A
16 January 2010	Queen's University Belfast	H	1-17 – 0-8
20 January 2010	Antrim	H	0-19 – 1-10
24 January 2010	Derry	A	1-13 – 1-15

==== Table ====
Qualified for next round

Team	Pld	W	D	L	F	A	Diff	Pts
Down	3	3	0	0	2-51	2-31	+20	6
Antrim	3	2	0	1	4-32	0-48	-4	4
Derry	3	1	0	2	5-44	5-29	+15	2
Queen's University Belfast	3	0	0	3	1-29	5-48	-31	0

==== Rounds ====
Round	Home	Score	Away
Semi Final	Donegal	1-13 v 1-12	Down

==== Matches and reports ====
16 January 2010

Down	1-17 – 0-08	Queen's University Belfast

Páirc Esler, Newry

20 January 2010

Down	0-19 – 1-10	Antrim

Páirc Esler, Newry

24 January 2010

Derry	1-13 – 1-15	Down

Celtic Park, Derry

=== National Football League Division 2 ===
==== Results ====
Round	1	2	3	4	5	6	7
Result	0-8 – 1-16	0-12 - 0-8	0-14 - 1-11	0-11 - 0-13	1-13 - 1-6	0-8 - 2-15	2-11 - 1-13

==== Table ====
Compete in Division 2 final and automatic promotion to Division 1 Automatic relegation to Division 3

Team	Pld	W	D	L	F	A	Diff	Pts
Down	7	6	1	0	6–94	3–65	+38	13
Armagh	7	5	0	2	6–94	5–60	+37	10
Donegal	7	4	0	3	7–71	5–75	+2	8
Meath	7	4	0	3	4–76	5–76	−3	8
Laois	7	3	0	4	3–89	9–76	−5	6
Kildare	7	3	0	4	3–80	5–80	−6	6
Tipperary	7	2	1	4	9–65	5–88	−11	5
Westmeath	7	0	0	7	8–58	9–107	−52	0

- Donegal were placed ahead of Meath as they won the head-to-head match between the teams (27 March at Ballybofey: 1–12 to 0–10).
- Laois were placed ahead of Kildare as they won the head-to-head match between the teams (27 March at O'Moore Park: 0–13 to 0–9).

==== Matches and reports ====
7 February 2010

Kildare	0-8 – 1-16	Down
R Kelly 0-3, K Ennis 0-2, G White, P O'Neill, J Kavanagh 0-1 each		P McComiskey 1-4 (0-2f), A Rodgers, M Clarke (0-3f) 0-3 each, J Clarke 0-2, C Garvey, D Hughes, S Kearney, C Laverty 0-1 each

St Conleth's Park, Newbridge, County Kildare, Ireland
Referee: D Fahy (Longford)

12 February 2010; 19:30	Down	0-12 - 0-8	Meath	Páirc Esler
12 February 2010; 19:30	J Clarke 0-4, P McComiskey 0-3 (3f), M Clarke 0-2 (1f), A Rodgers 0-2, C Maginn 0-1	Report	C Ward 0-4 (2f), D Bray 0-2 (2f), N Crawford, M Ward 0-1 each	Páirc Esler

6 March 2010; 19:30	Down	0-14 - 1-11	Tipperary	Páirc Esler; Referee: J Curley (Meath)
6 March 2010; 19:30	M Clarke 0-5 (0-4 f), C Laverty, J Clarke 0-3 each, P McComiskey 0-2 (0-2f), C Maginn 0-1	Report	B Coen 1-1 (0-1f), C Sweeney 0-5 (0-4f), B Brogan 0-2f, C Aylward 0-2, P Austin 0-1	Páirc Esler; Referee: J Curley (Meath)

13 March 2010; 7:30 p.m.	Donegal	0-11 - 0-13	Down	Ballybofey; Referee: Pat McEnaney (Monaghan)
13 March 2010; 7:30 p.m.	B Coulter, M Clarke 0-3 (0-2f) each, J Clarke 0-2, K McKernan, A Rodgers, D Hughes, P McComiskey, P Fitzpatrick 0-1 each	Report	C McFadden 0-4 (0-1f), M Murphy 0-3 (0-2f), N Gallagher 0-2, A Thompson, M Maguire 0-1 each	Ballybofey; Referee: Pat McEnaney (Monaghan)

20 March 2010; 19:30	Down	1-13 - 1-6	Armagh	Páirc Esler; Referee: M Sludden (Tyrone)
20 March 2010; 19:30	B Coulter 1-1, M Poland 0-3 (2f), A Rodgers 0-3 (1f), J Clarke 0-2 (1f), M Clarke 0-2 (1f), C Maginn 0-1, D Hughes 0-1	Report	S McDonnell 1-3 (1f, 1pen), G Swift 0-2, F Moriarity 0-1	Páirc Esler; Referee: M Sludden (Tyrone)

27 March 2010; 7:30 p.m.	Westmeath	0-8 - 2-15	Down	Cusack Park; Referee: G Ó Conamha (Galway)
27 March 2010; 7:30 p.m.	M Flanagan 0-3 (0-2f, 0-1 sideline), J Smyth 0-2, P Greville (0-1f), G Hoey, G Flanagan 0-1 each	Report	M Poland 1-4, (0-3 f), A Rodgers 1-3 (0-1 '45), R Murtagh, J Clarke 0-3 each, D Hughes, C Maginn 0-1 each	Cusack Park; Referee: G Ó Conamha (Galway)

11 April 2010	Down	2-11 - 1-13	Laois	Páirc Esler; Referee: J White (Donegal)
11 April 2010	M Clarke 1-5 (4f), J Clarke 1-3 (1f), K Duffin, R Murtagh, A Carr 0-1 each	Report	D Kingston 1-7 (5f), C Healy, C Bogle, K Meaney, P Callaghan, R Munnelly, C Bergin 0-1 each	Páirc Esler; Referee: J White (Donegal)

===== Final =====
25 April 2010; 4:00 p.m. Division 2 Final	Down	1–12 – 0–17	Armagh	Croke Park, Dublin; Referee: Gearóid Ó Conamha (Galway)
25 April 2010; 4:00 p.m. Division 2 Final	Conor Garvey (0-1); Peter Fitzpatrick (0-1), Kalum King (0-1), Martin Clarke (0-5), Daniel Hughes (0-1); Paul McComiskey (0-1), Benny Coulter (1-2)	Report	Paul Duffy (0-1), Finian Moriarty (0-1); Aaron Kernan (0-4), Gareth Swift (0-2); Steven McDonnell (0-6), Stephen Forker (0-1), Malachy Mackin (0-2)	Croke Park, Dublin; Referee: Gearóid Ó Conamha (Galway)

=== Ulster Senior Football Championship ===
==== Rounds ====
Preliminary Round
Derry	1-7
Armagh	1-10

Quarter-finals
Antrim	1-13
Tyrone	2-14
Donegal	2-10
Down	1-15
Cavan	0-13
Fermanagh	1-13
Monaghan	1-18
Armagh	0-9

Semi-finals
Tyrone	0-14
Down	0-10
Fermanagh	2-8
Monaghan	0-21

Ulster final
Tyrone	1-14
Monaghan	0-7

==== Matches and reports ====
30 May 2010
Quarter Final

Donegal	2-10 – 1-15 AET	Down
D Molloy 1-3, C Dunne 1-0, R Kavanagh, D Walsh, M Murphy, A Hanlon, M McHugh, C McFadden, E Wade 0-1 each.	Report	B Coulter 1-4, D Hughes 0-4, M Poland, M Clarke 0-3 each, J Clarke 0-1.

MacCumhaill Park, Ballybofey
Referee: Joe McQuillan (Cavan)

19 June 2010
Semi Final

Tyrone	0-14 - 0-10	Down
M Penrose 0-5, S Cavanagh 0-3, B Dooher 0-2, Joe McMahon, D Carlin, C Cavanagh, O Mulligan 0-1 each.	Report	M Clarke 0-3, M Poland, A Rogers 0-2 each, D Gordon, D Hughes, P McComiskey 0-1 each.

Casement Park, Belfast
Referee: G. Kinneavy (Galway)

=== All-Ireland Senior Football Championship ===
==== Qualifiers ====
Round	1	2	3	4
Result	N/A	1-14 - 1-10	1-10 - 1-12	0-10 - 3-20

==== Rounds ====
Quarter-finals
Roscommon	0-10
Cork	1-16
Tyrone	0-13
Dublin	1-15
Meath	1-12
Kildare	2-17
Kerry	1-10
Down	1-16

Semi-finals
Cork	1-15
Dublin	1-14
Kildare	1-14
Down	1-16

All-Ireland final
Cork	0-16
Down	0-15

==== Matches and reports ====
10 July 2010
Round 2

Down	1-14 - 1-10	Longford
M Clarke 1-5, D Hughes, M Poland 0-3 each, B Coulter, J Clarke, D Rooney 0-1 each	Report	F McGee 1-7, P Barden 0-2, N Farrell 0-1

Pairc Esler, Newry
Referee: M. Higgins (Fermanagh)

17 July 2010
Round 3

Offaly	1-10 - 1-12	Down
K Casey 1-1, R Brady, B Connor, C McManus 0-2 each, A Sullivan, J Reynolds, N McNamee 0-1 each	Report	M Clarke 0-5, A Carr 1-0, M Poland 0-3, J Clarke 0-2, B Coulter, D Hughes 0-1 each

O'Connor Park, Tullamore
Referee: M. Duffy (Sligo)

24 July 2010
Round 4

Sligo	0-10 - 3-20	Down
A Marren 0-4, S Coen, D Kelly, C McGee 0-2 each	Report	R Murtagh 1-5, J Clarke, A Rogers 1-1 each, M Clarke 0-4, D Hughes 0-3, M Poland 0-2, K McKernan, P Fitzpatrick, P McComiskey, C Garvey 0-1 each

Breffni Park, Cavan
Referee: Maurice Deegan (Laois)
31 July 2010
Quarter-final

Kerry	1-10 - 1-16	Down
C Cooper 0-7, B Sheehan 0-3, D Moran 1-0	Report	M Poland 1-2, M Clarke 0-4, B Coulter 0-3, P McComiskey, A Rodgers 0-2 each, C Maginn, R Murtagh, P Fitzpatrick 0-1 each

Croke Park, Dublin
Attendance: 62,749
Referee: Joe McQuillan (Cavan)

29 August 2010
Semi-final

Kildare	1-14 - 1-16	Down
J Doyle 0-6, E Callaghan 1-1, H Lynch 0-2, M O'Flaherty, E Bolton, J Kavanagh, K Ennis, D Lyons 0-1 each	Report	B Coulter 1-2, M Clarke, M Poland 0-3 each, K McKernan, D Hughes 0-2 each, P Fitzpatrick, P McComiskey, C Maginn, R Murtagh 0-1 each

Croke Park, Dublin
Attendance: 62,182
Referee: Pat McEnaney (Monaghan)

19 September 2010
Final

Cork	0-16 - 0-15	Down
D Goulding 0-9, D O'Connor 0-5, P Kerrigan, C Sheehan 0-1 each	Report	D Hughes, P McComiskey, M Clarke 0-3 each, K McKernan, P Fitzpatrick, M Poland, B Coulter, J Clarke, R Murtagh 0-1 each

Croke Park, Dublin
Attendance: 81,604
Referee: David Coldrick (Meath)
