= List of footballers with an All-Ireland Senior Football Championship runners-up medal =

This is a list of Gaelic footballers who have played on a losing team in the final of the All-Ireland Senior Football Championship. Losing teams receive runners-up medals.

This list only includes (1) footballers whose medal(s) resulted from being on the field of play in a final; and (2) footballers who did not or have not won a winners' medal in a prior or later final. Players are organised by year of first medal, then number of medals, then surname.

| Player | Team | Total number of final appearances | Years | Notes |
|---|---|---|---|---|
| Chris Barrett | Mayo | 1 | 2013 | |
| Cathal Carolan | Mayo | 1 | 2013 | |
| Tom Cunniffe | Mayo | 1 | 2013 | |
| Rob Hennelly | Mayo | 1 | 2013 | |
| Colm Boyle | Mayo | 2 | 2012, 2013 | |
| Ger Cafferkey | Mayo | 2 | 2012, 2013 | |
| Jason Doherty | Mayo | 2 | 2012, 2013 | |
| Alan Freeman | Mayo | 2 | 2012, 2013 | |
| Lee Keegan | Mayo | 2 | 2012, 2013 | |
| Kevin McLoughlin | Mayo | 2 | 2012, 2013 | |
| Cillian O'Connor | Mayo | 2 | 2012, 2013 | |
| Aidan O'Shea | Mayo | 2 | 2012, 2013 | |
| Séamus O'Shea | Mayo | 2 | 2012, 2013 | |
| Enda Varley | Mayo | 2 | 2012, 2013 | |
| Donal Vaughan | Mayo | 2 | 2012, 2013 | |
| Richie Feeney | Mayo | 1 | 2012 | |
| Kevin Keane | Mayo | 1 | 2012 | |
| John Clarke | Down | 1 | 2010 | |
| Martin Clarke | Down | 1 | 2010 | |
| Benny Coulter | Down | 1 | 2010 | |
| Dan Gordon | Down | 1 | 2010 | |
| Daniel Hughes | Down | 1 | 2010 | |
| Kalum King | Down | 1 | 2010 | |
| Daniel McCartan | Down | 1 | 2010 | |
| Paul McComiskey | Down | 1 | 2010 | |
| Kevin McKernan | Down | 1 | 2010 | |
| Brendan McVeigh | Down | 1 | 2010 | |
| Keith Higgins | Mayo | 3 | 2006, 2012, 2013 | |
| Barry Moran | Mayo | 3 | 2006, 2012, 2013 | |
| David Clarke | Mayo | 2 | 2006, 2012 | |
| Ger Brady | Mayo | 1 | 2006 | |
| Pat Harte | Mayo | 1 | 2006 | |
| Billy Joe Padden | Mayo | 1 | 2006 | |
| Michael Conroy | Mayo | 4 | 2004, 2006, 2012, 2013 | |
| Alan Dillon | Mayo | 4 | 2004, 2006, 2012, 2013 | |
| Andy Moran | Mayo | 3 | 2004, 2006, 2013 | |
| Conor Mortimer | Mayo | 2 | 2004, 2006 | |
| Pat Kelly | Mayo | 1 | 2004 | |
| Brian Maloney | Mayo | 1 | 2004 | |
| Christy Byrne | Kildare | 1 | 1998 | |
| Dermot Earley Jnr | Kildare | 1 | 1998 | |
| Karl O'Dwyer | Kildare | 1 | 1998 | |
| Anthony Rainbow | Kildare | 1 | 1998 | |
| Glenn Ryan | Kildare | 1 | 1998 | |
| Ciarán McDonald | Mayo | 3 | 1997, 2004, 2006 | |
| David Nestor | Mayo | 1 | 1997 | |
