= Match for Michaela =

Donegal	Ulster
1–12	2–12
- Date: 3 November 2012
- Venue: Casement Park, Belfast
- Referee: Maurice Deegan (Laois)
- Attendance: 18,662

Match for Michaela was a Gaelic football match played under floodlights at Casement Park in Belfast on Saturday 3 November 2012. The match was held in memory of Michaela McAreavey.

== Background ==
All-Ireland Senior Champions Donegal played a team comprising players from the rest of Ulster in an event intended to raise funds for The Michaela Foundation. Match for Michaela was launched on 25 October 2012.

Match for Michaela marked the first occasion that the Donegal senior football team played since winning the 2012 All-Ireland Senior Football Championship Final on 23 September. The game took place ahead of a planned redevelopment of Casement Park.

== Team selection ==
=== Donegal ===
Donegal manager Jim McGuinness named a squad featuring six All Stars—Paul Durcan, Frank McGlynn, Karl Lacey, Neil Gallagher, Mark McHugh and Michael Murphy. The position of Lacey, the 2012 All Stars Footballer of the Year, was in some doubt ahead of the game after he picked up a hamstring injury playing for his club Four Masters. As the final of the 2012 Donegal Senior Football Championship was the following day, players from the St Eunan's and Naomh Conaill clubs were excused. Among these were Rory Kavanagh, Leo McLoone and Anthony Thompson.

No.	Player	Position	Club
1	Paul Durcan	Goalkeeper	The Four Masters
2	Paddy McGrath	Right corner back	Ardara
3	Eamon McGee	Full back	Gaoth Dobhair
4	Tommy McKinley	Left corner back	Naomh Colmcille
5	Frank McGlynn	Right half back	Glenfin
6	Karl Lacey	Centre back	The Four Masters
7	Declan Walsh	Left half back	Malin
8	Christy Toye	Midfield	St Michael's
9	Neil Gallagher	Midfield	Glenswilly
10	Daniel McLaughlin	Centre forward	St Michael's
11	Adrian Hanlon	Left half forward	An Clochán Liath
12	Ryan Bradley	Right half forward	Buncrana
13	Patrick McBrearty	Right corner forward	Cill Chartha
14	Michael Murphy (c)	Full forward	Glenswilly
15	David Walsh	Left corner forward	Naomh Bríd

No.	Player	Position	Club
16	Michael Boyle	Substitute	Termon
17	Antoin McFadden	Substitute	St Michael's
18	Mark McHugh	Substitute	Cill Chartha
19	Peter Witherow	Substitute	St Michael's
20	Martin McElhinney	Substitute	St Michael's
21	Stephen Griffin	Substitute	St Naul's
22	Barry Dunnion	Substitute	The Four Masters
23	Martin O'Reilly	Substitute	Seán MacCumhaill's
24	Gary McFadden	Substitute	Glenswilly
25	Peter McGee	Substitute	Gaoth Dobhair

- Manager: Jim McGuinness
- Selectors: Rory Gallagher, Maxi Curran, Pat Shovelin
  - Surgical consultant: Kevin Moran
  - Team doctor: Charlie McManus
  - Team physio: Dermot Simpson
- Backroom team: Physical Therapists: Charlie Molloy, Paul Coyle, Donal Reid, JD.

=== Ulster ===
Ulster manager Joe Kernan named a squad containing at least one player from every county in Ulster, apart from their opponents Donegal. Four players from Tyrone were named in the squad.

No.	Player	Position	Club
1	Brendan McVeigh	Goalkeeper	An Ríocht/Down
2	Ryan McCluskey	Right corner back	Dungannon Swifts/Fermanagh
3	Dan Gordon	Full back	Loughinisland/Down
4	Chrissy McKaigue	Left corner back	Slaughtneil/Derry
5	Ciarán McKeever	Right half back	Cullyhanna/Armagh
6	Darren Hughes (c)	Centre back	Scotstown/Monaghan
7	James Loughrey	Left half back	St Brigid's/Antrim
8	Seán Cavanagh	Midfield	Moy Tír Na nÓg/Tyrone
9	David Gibney	Midfield	Mountnugent/Cavan
10	Colm Cavanagh	Centre forward	Moy Tír Na nÓg/Tyrone
11	Mark Poland	Left half forward	Longstone/Down
12	Joe McMahon	Right half forward	Omagh St Enda's/Tyrone
13	Martin Penrose	Right corner forward	Carrickmore St Colmcille's/Tyrone
14	Michael McCann	Full forward	Cargin/Antrim
15	Conor McManus	Left corner forward	Clontibret O'Neills/Monaghan

No.	Player	Position	Club
16	Niall Morgan	Substitute	Edendork St Malachy's/Tyrone
17	Conor Gormley	Substitute	Carrickmore St Colmcille's/Tyrone
18	Vinny Corey	Substitute	Clontibret O'Neills/Monaghan
19	Brendan Donaghy	Substitute	Clonmore Robert Emmet's/Armagh
20	Ambrose Rogers	Substitute	Longstone/Down
21	Gearóid McKiernan	Substitute	Swanlinbar St Mary's/Cavan
22	Brendan Coulter	Substitute	Mayobridge/Down

- Manager: Joe Kernan

== Match details ==
3 November 2012
7.15 p.m. GMT

Donegal	1–12 — 2–12	Ulster
	Report

Casement Park, Belfast
Attendance: 18,662
Referee: Maurice Deegan (Laois)

Donegal
