= 2009 Down county football team season =

Down county football team
2009 season
- Manager: Ross Carr
- Stadium: Páirc Esler, Newry
- NFL D3: 1st (runner-up)
- All-Ireland SFC: Round 3 qualifier
- Ulster SFC: First round
- Dr McKenna Cup: Semi-finalist

The following is a summary of Down county football team's 2009 season.

== Kits ==
Home	Away

== Competitions ==
Win Draw Loss

=== Dr McKenna Cup ===
==== Results ====
Date	Opponents	H / A	Result F – A
4 January 2009	St Mary's	A	0-10 – 3-16
11 January 2009	Tyrone	H	0-16 – 0-09
14 January 2009	Monaghan	A	1-12 – 1-09

==== Table ====
Qualified for next round

Team	Pld	W	D	L	F	A	Diff	Pts
Down	3	2	0	1	4-41	1-31	+19	4
Tyrone	3	2	0	1	4-36	2-44	-2	4
Monaghan	3	1	0	2	2-39	3-40	-4	2
St Mary's	3	1	0	2	3-34	7-25	-13	2

==== Rounds ====
Round	Home	Score	Away
Semi-final	Queen's University	1-17 v 1-11	Down

==== Matches and reports ====
16 January 2010

Down	1-17 – 0-08	Queen's University Belfast

Páirc Esler, Newry

20 January 2010

Down	0-19 – 1-10	Antrim

Páirc Esler, Newry

24 January 2010

Derry	1-13 – 1-15	Down

Celtic Park, Derry

=== National Football League Division 3 ===
Compete in Division 3 final and automatic promotion to Division 2 Automatic relegation to Division 4

Team	Pld	W	D	L	F	A	Diff	Pts
Down	7	5	0	2	4-96	5-72	21	10
Tipperary	7	5	0	2	5-89	4-78	14	10
Offaly	7	3	1	3	7-68	6-89	-18	7
Louth	7	3	0	4	6-91	5-83	11	6
Cavan	7	3	0	4	2-85	6-76	-3	6
Roscommon	7	3	0	4	3-82	2-88	-3	6
Limerick	7	3	0	4	6-66	6-74	-8	6
Longford	7	2	1	4	3-67	2-84	-14	5

==== Final ====
2009
Final

Down	1-14 – 0-18	Tipperary
A Carr 0-5 (0-4f), R Murtagh 1-1, D Gordon, D Hughes 0-2 each, B McArdle, C Magee, J Boyle, C Garvey 0-1 each		B Grogan 0-5 (0-4f, 0-1 pen), B Coen 0-4, J Tierney 0-3 (0-2f), B Mulvihill 0-2, D O’Brien, C Aylward, J Cagney, S Carey 0-1 each

Pearse Stadium
Referee: Cormac Reilly (Meath)

=== Ulster Senior Football Championship ===
==== Rounds ====
Round 1
Fermanagh	0-13
Down	0-10

Quarter-finals
Tyrone	2-10
Armagh	1-10
Derry	1-10
Monaghan	0-10
Cavan	0-13
Fermanagh	1-09
Antrim	1-10
Donegal	0-12

Semi-finals
Tyrone	0-15
Derry	0-07
Cavan	1-07
Antrim	0-13

Final
Tyrone	1-18
Antrim	0-15

==== Results ====
17 May 2009
First round

Fermanagh	0-13 - 0-10	Down
R Carson 0-6, J Sherry 0-2, T McElroy, M Little, M McGrath, D Keenan, C McElroy 0-1 each	Report	A Carr, B Coulter, P McComiskey, D Hughes 0-2 each, S Kearney, P Fitzpatrick 0-1 each, A Carr SO

Brewster Park, Enniskillen

=== All-Ireland Senior Football Championship ===
==== Qualifiers ====
4 July 2009 Round 1	Down	1-16 - 1-07	London	Páirc Esler, Newry
	Daniel Hughes, P McComiskey, J Boyle 0-3 each, B.Coulter 1-0, B McArdle, C Garvey, D Gordan 0-2 each, R Sexton 0-1	Report	C Donnellan 1-0, P Duffy, K Downes, K McMenamin 0-2 each, P Geraghty 0-1

11 July 2009 Round 2	Down	2-09 - 0-07	Laois	Páirc Esler, Newry
	B Coulter 1-1, P McComiskey 1-0, D Hughes, A Carr, T Hanna 0-2 each, C Garvey, B McArdle 0-1 each	Report	MJ Tierney 0-4, B McDonald, B Quigley, N Donoher 0-1 each

18 July 2009 Round 3	Wicklow	1-15 - 0-17	Down	Aughrim Park, Wicklow
	T Hannon 0-6, L Glynn 1-3, S Furlong 0-4, JP Dalton, D Odlum 0-1 each	Report	P McComiskey 0-4, D Hughes 0-3, A Rodgers 0-2, C McGovern, T Hanna, C Garvey, D Gordon, B McArdle, B Coulter, R Sexton, R Murtagh 0-1 each
