= Clerkin =

Clerkin is a surname. Notable people with the surname include:

- Cavan Clerkin (born 1973), British television actor and writer
- Dennis Clerkin (born 1950), American bridge player
- Dick Clerkin, Irish Gaelic footballer
- John Clerkin (born 1949), American politician
- Michael Clerkin (1952–1976), killed by an IRA bomb
