= 2014 Down county football team season =

Down county football team
2014 season
- Manager: James McCartan Jnr
- Stadium: Pairc Esler, Newry
- NFL D2: 4th
- All-Ireland SFC: Round 2B qualifier
- Ulster SFC: Preliminary round
- Dr McKenna Cup: Group stage (3rd)

The following is a summary of Down county football team's 2014 season. This season marked the 20th anniversary of Down's last All-Ireland SFC win in 1994, which is also the year they last won the Ulster SFC.

== Kits ==
McKenna Cup and National League Kits

Home	Away

== Competitions ==
Win Draw Loss Postponed/Cancelled

=== Dr McKenna Cup ===
The draw for the 2014 Dr McKenna Cup took place on 12 November 2013.

The final McKenna Cup tie for UUJ vs Cavan was cancelled due to UUJ withdrawing from the competition.

==== Fixtures ====
Date	Round	Home	Score	Away	Ground
5 Jan	Group	Down	1-15 v 0-07	UUJ	Páirc Esler, Newry
12 Jan	Group	Cavan	1-09 v 0-05	Down	O'Raghallaigh Park, Kingscourt
15 Jan	Group	Down	0-10 v 1-12	Antrim	Páirc Esler, Newry

==== Table ====
Qualified for next round

Team	Pld	W	D	L	F	A	Diff	Pts
Cavan	3	3	0	0	4-21	0-17	16	6
Antrim	3	2	0	1	2-41	5-30	2	4
Down	3	1	0	2	1-30	2-28	-1	2
UUJ	3	0	0	3	2-15	2-32	-17	0

- 15/01/14 Cavan vs UUJ – UUJ concede fixture due to inability to field team.

==== Results ====
5 January 2014
14:00
Group

Down	1-15 — 0-07	UUJ
M Poland (0-5), C O Hare (0-3), P Fitzpatrick (1-0), E Mc Cartan (0-1), D Mc Cartan (0-1), Liam Devlin (0-1), K King (0-1), C Harrison (0-1), N Madine (0-1), G Mc Ardle (0-1)	Report	D Savage (0-3), D Mc Kay(0-1), C O Boyle (0-1), P Mc Polin (0-1), N Mc Keever (0-1)

Páirc Esler, Newry
Referee: Joe McQuillan (Cavan)
12 January 2014
14:00
Group

Cavan	1-09 — 0-05	Down
E Keating (0-3), K Tierney (1-0), T Mooney (0-2), D Givney (0-2), P Tinnelly (0-1), N Murray (0-1)	Report	N Madine (0-2), D O'Hanlon (0-1), R Boyle (0-1), B Coulter (0-1)

O'Raghallaigh Park, Kingscourt
Referee: Sean Hurson (Tyrone)
15 January 2014
19:00
Group

Down	0-10 — 1-12	Antrim
N Madine (0-4), D O'Hanlon (0-3), L Doyle (0-2), A Carr (0-1)	Report	P Cunningham (1-3), P Maguire (0-2), M Sweeney (0-1), M McCann (0-1), P Kelly (0-1), C Duffin (0-1), M Pollock (0-1, B Neeson (0-1), CJ McGourty (0-1)

Páirc Esler, Newry
Referee: S McNamee

=== National Football League Division 2 ===
==== Fixtures ====
Date	Round	Home	Score	Away	Ground
1 Feb	Group	Down		Monaghan	Páirc Esler, Newry
2 Feb	Group	Down	1-11 v 0-14	Monaghan	Páirc Esler, Newry
7 Feb	Group	Armagh	2-05 v 2-07	Down	Athletic Grounds, Armagh
1 Mar	Group	Down	4-16 v 0-09	Louth	Páirc Esler, Newry
9 Mar	Group	Galway	1-12 v 0-08	Down	St Jarlath's Park, Tuam
16 Mar	Group	Down	1-09 v 0-10	Donegal	Páirc Esler, Newry
29 Mar	Group	Meath	1-14 v 1-11	Down	Páirc Tailteann, Navan
6 Apr	Group	Laois	1-16 v 2-10	Down	O'Moore Park, Portlaoise

- 01/02/14 Down vs Monaghan – Postponed due to waterlogged pitch

==== Table ====
Compete in Division 2 final
Automatic relegation to Division 3

Team	Pld	W	D	L	F	A	Diff	Pts
Donegal	7	5	1	1	9-97	7-67	36	11
Monaghan	7	5	1	1	3-107	3-78	29	11
Meath	7	4	1	2	9-87	8-95	-5	9
Down	7	3	1	3	11-72	5-80	10	7
Laois	7	3	0	4	7-89	6-100	-8	6
Galway	7	2	1	4	7-84	8-97	-16	5
Armagh	7	2	1	4	7-86	10-86	-9	5
Louth	7	0	2	5	6-76	12-95	-37	2

^{1}Donegal are placed ahead of Monaghan because they won the head-to-head game between the teams (2-11 to 0-10).

^{2}Galway are placed ahead of Armagh because they won the head-to-head game between the teams (2-14 to 1-13).

==== Results ====
2 February 2014 Round 1	Down	1-11 — 0-14	Monaghan	Páirc Esler, Newry
14:00	D O'Hare (0-4), J Johnston (0-2), R Boyle (0-1), C Garvey (0-1), D O'Hanlon (0-1), C Maginn (1-0), R Johnston (0-1), E McCartan (0-1)	Report	J McCarron (0-7), T Kerr (0-2), C McManus (0-2), C McGuinness (0-1), R Beggan (0-1), P Finlay (0-1)	Referee: C Reilly

7 February 2014 Round 2	Armagh	2-05 — 2-07	Down	Athletic Grounds, Armagh
19:00	K Dyas (1-0), S Harold (1-0), C Rafferty (0-1), S Campbell (0-1), J Clarke (0-1), T Kernan (0-1), R Tasker (0-1)	Report	M Poland (2-0), K McKernan (0-2), D O'Hare (0-2), N Madine (0-1), C Maginn (0-1), E McCartan (0-1)	Attendance: 5,557; Referee: David Coldrick (Meath)

1 March 2014 Round 3	Down	4-16 — 0-09	Louth	Páirc Esler, Newry
19:00	D O Hare (1-10), B Coulter (2-00), C Maginn (1-00), N Madine (0-02), K McKernan (0-01), J Johnston (0-01), M Poland (0-01), P Fitzpatrick (0-01)	Report	D Byrne (0-03), C Judge (0-02), D Clarke (0-02), B White (0-01), K Rodgers (0-01)	Referee: M Higgins

9 March 2014 Round 4	Galway	1-12 — 0-08	Down	St Jarlath's Park, Tuam
14:00	M Martin (0-3), E Hoare (0-3), J Kavanagh (0-2), P Varley (0-1), T Flynn (0-1), S Armstrong (0-1), G Sice (0-1), D Cummins (1-0)	Report	D O'Hare (0-6), K McKernan (0-2)	Referee: D O Mahoney

16 March 2014 Round 5	Down	1-09 — 0-10	Donegal	Páirc Esler, Newry
14:00	N Madine (1-1), M Poland (0-2), D O'Hare (0-2), C Garvey (0-2), K McKernan (0-1), C Laverty (0-1)	Report	M Murphy (0-3), C McFadden (0-2), D Molloy (0-2), L McLoone (0-1), M McElhinney (0-1), N Gallagher (0-1)	Referee: C O'Hagan

29 March 2014 Round 6	Meath	1-14 — 1-11	Down	Páirc Tailteann, Navan
19:00	Graham Reilly 1-2; Stephen Bray 0-3; Shane O'Rourke 0-2, Andrew Tormey 0-2, Damien Carroll 0-2; Michael Newman 0-1, Seamus Kenny 0-1, Bryan Menton 0-1.	Report	Donal O'Hare 0-6; Ambrose Rodgers 1-0; Daniel McCartan 0-1, Mark Polan 0-1, Niall Madine 0-1, Jerome Johnston 0-1, Paul Devlin 0-1	Referee: C O'Sullivan

6 April 2014 Round 7	Laois	1-16 — 2-10	Down	O'Moore Park, Portlaoise
15:00	R Munnelly (0-6), J O'Loughlin (1-2), D Kingston (0-3), D Conway (0-3) D Strong (0-1), C Meredith (0-1)	Report	O'Hare (0-4), Carr (1-0), Maginn (1-0), J Johnston (0-2), C Garvey (0-1), M Poland (0-1), N Madine (0-1), C Laverty (0-1)	Referee: Conor Lane (Cork)

=== Ulster Senior Football Championship ===
==== Fixtures ====
The draw for the 2014 Ulster Senior Football Championship took place on 3 October 2013.

Date	Round	Team 1	Score	Team 2	Ground
18 May 2014	Preliminary Round	Tyrone	2-11 v 3-08	Down	Healy Park, Omagh,
24 May 2014	Preliminary Round Replay	Down	0-12 v 3-11	Tyrone	Pairc Esler, Newry,

==== Bracket ====
Preliminary round
Tyrone (R)	2-11; 3-11
Down (R)	3-08; 0-12

Quarter-finals
Tyrone	0-14
Monaghan	1-12
Armagh	1-12
Cavan	0-09
Fermanagh	3-13
Antrim	2-18
Derry	0-11
Donegal	1-11

Semi-finals
Monaghan (R)	0-14; 1-18
Armagh (R)	0-14; 1-13
Antrim	0-12
Donegal	3-16

Final
Monaghan	1-09
Donegal	0-15

==== Results ====
Sunday 18 May 2014
16:00
Preliminary Round

Tyrone	2-11 v 3-08	Down
D McCurry (1-2), Cavanagh (0-5), P Harte (1-0), K Coney (0-3). N Morgan (0-1)	Report	D O'Hare (1-2), A Carr (1-0), C Maginn (1-0), C Garvey (0-1), A Rogers (0-1), M Poland (0-1), N Madine (0-1), C Laverty (0-1), B Coulter (0-1)

Healy Park, Omagh
Attendance: 13,266
Referee: David Coldrick (Meath)
Saturday 24 May 2014
18:30
Preliminary Round Replay

Down	0-12 v 3-11	Tyrone
D O'Hare (0-6), C Laverty (0-2), C Garvey (0-1), D Gordon (0-1), C Maginn (0-1), B Coulter (0-1)	Report	C McGinley (2-1), P Harte (1-1), N Morgan (0-3), D McCurry (0-2), M Donnelly (0-1), R O'Neill (0-1), N McKenna (0-1), C McAliskey (0-1)

Páirc Esler, Newry
Referee: C Reilly

=== All-Ireland Senior Football Championship ===
2014 saw the introduction of a new qualifiers set up with the fixtures being split into two sections A and B.

Down entered the All-Ireland series in Round 1B of the qualifiers. The draw for Round 1B took place on Monday 9 June and paired Down with Leitrim in Pairc Esler on Sunday 29 June at 2pm. Down were favourites to win and they hammered Leitrim 4–18 to 0–09 on the day to progress to Round 2B. The draw for Round 2B took place at 8:30am on Monday 30 June live on Morning Ireland, with Down being paired with Leinster side Kildare.

Down exited the 2014 All-Ireland series with a poor performance against Kildare, scoring only 3 points in the first half, only one of which was from open play. In the second half Down staged a comeback but eventually lost when Kildare hit 1-06 without reply.

==== Fixtures ====
Date	Round	Team 1	Score	Team 2	Ground
29 June 2014	Round 1B	Down	4-18 v 0-09	Leitrim	Pairc Esler, Newry
13 July 2014	Round 2B	Down	0-11 v 1-18	Kildare	Pairc Esler, Newry

==== Results ====
29 June 2014
14:00
Round 1B

Down	4-18 v 0-09	Leitrim
C Laverty (2-4), D O'Hare (0-4), L Doyle (0-2), B Coulter (0-2), M Poland (0-2), D Turley (1-0), K McKernan (0-1), D Gordon (0-1), C Maginn (0-1), N Madine (1-0)	Report	E Mulligan (0-5), G Reynolds (0-1), S McWeeney (0-1), R Lowe (0-1), N Moore (0-1)

Páirc Esler, Newry
Referee: A Nolan
13 July 2014
14:00
Round 2B

Down	0-11 v 1-18	Kildare
B Coulter (0-4), D O'Hare (0-3), D Rooney (0-1), D O'Hagan (0-1), C Maginn (0-1), C Laverty (0-1)	Report	P Fogarty (0-4), T Moolick (1-0), A Smith (0-3), P O'Neill (0-3), C McNally (0-2), N Kelly (0-2), E Bolton (0-1), G White (0-1), E Callaghan (0-1), E O'Flaherty (0-1)

Páirc Esler, Newry
Attendance: 6,375
Referee: David Coldrick (Meath)

=== Notable events ===
- On Saturday 26 July, James McCartan Jnr stepped down as Down manager after five full seasons in charge.
- On Wednesday 8 August, former All Star goalkeeper Brendan McVeigh announced his retirement from inter-county football.
- On Saturday 19 September, Kilcoo manager Jim McCorry was named as the new Down boss on a three-year deal.
