= Paddy McGrath =

Donegal Gaelic footballer

Personal information
- Native name: Pádraig Mac Craith (Irish)
- Born: 2 February 1989 (age 37) Ardara, County Donegal
- Occupation: Construction manager
- Height: 5 ft 10 in (178 cm)

Sport
- Sport: Gaelic football
- Position: Left Corner Back
Club
- Years: Club
- ?–: Ard an Rátha
Inter-county
Years	County	Apps (scores)
2010–2021	Donegal	100+
Inter-county titles
- Ulster titles: 5
- All-Irelands: 1

Paddy McGrath (born 2 February 1989) is an Irish Gaelic footballer who plays for Ard an Rátha and also, formerly, for the Donegal county team.

Though not from a footballing family, McGrath would equal his club's most successful player Anthony Molloy in winning the Sam Maguire Cup (though Molloy was captain) and surpass his haul of Ulster Senior Football Championships.

== Playing career ==
McGrath is not from a footballing family. He lived at Loughros Point in Ardara. His local club's under-10 manager Eamon McNelis spent much time convincing a reluctant McGrath that he had potential to be more than a spectator. He went on to captain the under-10 team to the Parish League title. He played for Donegal at under-16 and minor level but went largely unnoticed. He played Sigerson Cup football for GMIT.

=== Under-21 ===
McGrath, along with clubmates Conor Classon and Peter McNelis, was part of the Donegal under-21 squad which qualified for the 2010 All-Ireland Under-21 Football Championship final, losing out to Dublin. McGrath played in that game with a broken jaw — manager Jim McGuinness, after taking over as Donegal senior manager, recalled:

"I saw the x-ray myself. Paddy said to the surgeon, 'if I go out and get it broken again, what's the worst that can happen'. The surgeon told him, 'I'll fix it'. Paddy said, 'that's OK then. I'm going to play in the game'. That's the type of person that predominantly wins you football matches and I'm glad to have him in the senior squad".

McGrath had earlier played for Donegal throughout the Ulster Under-21 Football Championship, which they had won to progress to the All-Ireland final.

The players were unaware that McGrath's jaw was, as James Carroll, later described it, "wired". McGrath described the campaign as "a platform that set us up to be senior players". "Once Jim McGuinness got him, he got the best out of him", Eamon McNelis later said.

=== Senior ===
Having attracted notice during the under-21 campaign, McGrath made his senior Donegal debut under the management of John Joe Doherty in 2010. It was a substitute appearance against Down, who had Brendan Coulter score a vital goal to win the 2010 Ulster Senior Football Championship match in spite of the efforts of McGrath and others. Shortly afterwards, McGrath made his first start against Armagh in the All-Ireland Senior Football Championship qualifier defeat in Crossmaglen, lasting hardly a quarter of an hour before being substituted when Donegal conceded two early goals.

McGuinness took over as senior manager later that year. Around the same time, McGrath turned down an opportunity to become a full-time assistant site manager in the English city of Liverpool so that he could continue to play football. McGrath won his first senior inter-county medal in 2011 — the National Football League Division 2 title. "It's just a league medal and I want to push on now and achieve bigger things", he said afterwards, upsetting Damian Diver who said he had never won a single medal in all his years with Donegal.

McGrath soon added an Ulster Senior Football Championship to leave Diver languishing further behind in the shade.

McGrath added another Ulster Senior Football Championship the following year.

McGrath then went one better and got his hands on an All-Ireland senior medal. His defensive performance in the 2012 All-Ireland Senior Football Championship quarter-final defeat of Kerry, en route to the final, immortality and championship glory, was described in the national media as "exceptional".

He scored his first point for his county against Galway in a challenge game in 2013.

McGrath won his third Ulster Senior Football Championship in 2014, three more than Diver ever did.

McGrath scored a point against Tyrone in the 2017 National Football League. It marked the first occasion on which he had scored for Donegal, in league or in championship. McGrath then scored a goal in Donegal's 2017 Ulster Senior Football Championship defeat of Antrim. He tore a posterior cruciate ligament and sustained cartilage damage in 2017 while on club duty. However, he did not require surgery. He did though require a brace on his injured leg, was able to build up muscle around the knee to provide stability to the ligament and returned to the game after six months.

McGrath won his fourth Ulster Senior Football Championship in 2018, four more than Diver ever did. McGrath scored a point in the final against Fermanagh.

That first senior inter-county medal was repeated in 2019 when McGrath won the National Football League Division 2 title with Donegal for a second time, twice more than Diver ever did.

McGrath won his fifth Ulster Senior Football Championship in 2019, five more than Diver ever did.

However, McGrath's 2019 season ended at the All-Ireland quarter-final stage against Mayo in Castlebar when he sustained an anterior cruciate ligament injury, necessitating a prolonged spell out of the game. He had only returned to playing for Donegal in the same game, having sustained an earlier injury to his ankle following the final of the 2019 Ulster Senior Football Championship. An MRI conducted a few days later revealed a recurrence of his previous posterior cruciate ligament injury, but this time with a necessity for surgery. He spent time on crutches and was unable to walk. In January 2020, local media reported that McGrath was intending to make his return for the 2020 Ulster Senior Football Championship match against Tyrone.

McGrath announced his retirement from inter-county football ahead of the 2022 season.

== Personal life ==
McGrath has a wife, Stephanie, with whom he has several daughters. He became father to his first daughter in 2018.

=== Advocacy ===
McGrath appeared in a video advocating a vote for "No" in the 2018 referendum on the availability of abortion.

== Honours ==
Player

- All-Ireland Senior Football Championship: 2012
- Ulster Senior Football Championship: 2011, 2012, 2014, 2018, 2019
- National Football League Division 2: 2011, 2019
- All-Ireland Under-21 Football Championship runner-up: 2010
- Ulster Under-21 Football Championship: 2010

Individual

- All Star nomination: 2012, 2016
- Irish News Ulster All Star: 2019

A 2015 survey — conducted among U.S. women with little or no knowledge of Gaelic games — ranked McGrath in the top fifteen sexiest GAA players, third in Ulster and second in Donegal (after Patrick McBrearty).
