= Vinny Corey =

Monaghan Gaelic footballer

Vincent "Vinny" Corey is a Gaelic football manager and player. He plays for Clontibret O'Neills and was manager of the Monaghan county team between 2022 and 2024. Before that he spent 18 years as a Monaghan player.

== Playing career ==
Corey played at senior level for his county for 17 years, winning two Ulster Senior Football Championship (SFC) medals. Corey made his Ulster SFC debut for Monaghan against Armagh in 2003. He outlasted everyone who played in that game, except for an Armagh minor called Charlie Vernon, and is married to Joanne and they have children. He was captain in 2009. But he was not involved in the 2010 Ulster SFC final and he sat out 2011. He was part of the Match for Michaela.

Corey started the 2018 All-Ireland Senior Football Championship semi-final for Monaghan. In 2020, he stated that he had not ruled out a return to Monaghan.

== Managerial career ==
First, Corey became a selector with Monaghan. He then became manager of the team, replacing Séamus McEnaney in 2022.

He led his team to the 2023 All-Ireland SFC semi-final in his first season as manager. His second season as manager saw his team relegated after a lengthy period in Division 1 of the National Football League. Then Cavan knocked Monaghan out in the preliminary round of the 2024 Ulster SFC. Interest in the 2024 All-Ireland SFC was ended by Galway at the quarter-final stage.

Corey stepped down as Farney manager in August 2024. His own selector, Gabriel Bannigan, succeeded him.

Sporting positions
Preceded by Séamus McEnaney	Monaghan Senior Football manager 2022–2024	Succeeded by Gabriel Bannigan
