= John Clerkin =

American politician

Member of the Vermont House of Representatives from the Windsor-6-2 district
- In office 2007–2011

Personal details
- Born: March 19, 1949 (age 77) Woodsville, New Hampshire, U.S.
- Party: Republican
- Education: University of Vermont (BA)

John J. Clerkin (born March 19, 1949) is an American politician who served as a member of the Vermont House of Representatives for the Windsor-6-2 Representative District from 2007 to 2011.

== Early life and education ==
Clerkin was born in Woodsville, New Hampshire, in 1949. He earned a Bachelor of Arts degree from the University of Vermont in 1971 and a paralegal certificate from Woodbury College.

== Career ==
Outside of politics, Clerkin worked as a real estate broker. He served as a member of the Hartford Select Board and as town manager of Hartland, Vermont, and Castleton, Vermont. He was elected to the Vermont House of Representatives in 2006 and served until 2007.
