= Jack Treanor =

Australian cricketer (1922–1993

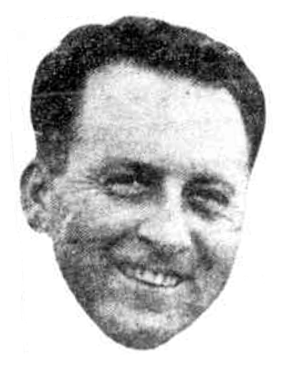

Personal information
- Full name: John Cassimar Treanor
- Born: 17 August 1922; Darlinghurst, Sydney, New South Wales, Australia
- Died: 7 November 1993 (aged 71); Ballina, New South Wales
- Batting: Left-handed
- Bowling: Right-arm leg-spin

Domestic team information
- Years: Team
- 1954–55 to 1956–57: New South Wales

Career statistics
| Competition | First-class |
|---|---|
| Matches | 17 |
| Runs scored | 197 |
| Batting average | 11.58 |
| 100s/50s | 0/0 |
| Top score | 33* |
| Balls bowled | 3,661 |
| Wickets | 63 |
| Bowling average | 27.71 |
| 5 wickets in innings | 4 |
| 10 wickets in match | 0 |
| Best bowling | 5/36 |
| Catches/stumpings | 3/– |
- Source: CricketArchive, 24 January 2017

John Cassimar Treanor (17 August 1922 – 7 November 1993) was a first-class cricketer who played for New South Wales between 1954 and 1957.

== Cricket career ==
A leg-spin bowler, Treanor made his first-class debut in the Sheffield Shield against Queensland in 1954–55, taking 5 for 146 and 3 for 69 (including a hat-trick) in the drawn match. In his next match he took 3 for 64 and 4 for 96 against the touring MCC, and in his third match he took 5 for 97 and 3 for 41 against Victoria. The English journalist Alan Ross thought Treanor was the best spin bowler in Australia at the time, and should have been chosen for the tour to England in 1956, but Treanor played only two matches in the 1955–56 season.

He took 28 wickets at an average of 30.25 in 1956–57, and took his best figures of 5 for 36 in the tied match against Victoria, but that was his last season of first-class cricket.

Treanor was a highly successful bowler in Sydney grade cricket. In the 1970s he coached the cricket team at the University of Wollongong.

== Personal life ==
In the Second World War Treanor served as a sapper with 2/4 Field Company. He married Norma Durrington in Lismore, New South Wales, in June 1947.
