= Conor Garvey =

Irish Gaelic footballer

Conor Gravey is an Irish Gaelic footballer who played in the 2010 All-Ireland Final. He operates at full-back. He currently plays as a centre forward for Mayobridge FC, scoring on his debut.

== Career ==
He was not allowed to play in the 2012 Ulster Senior Final because of a suspension. DB DB He was thought to have put a stamp on to Karl O'Connell in the Ulster Semi Final game with Monaghan. Down manager James McCartan Jnr confirmed it was not the stamp, but an instant of 'endangering an opposition player' that was noticed in video evidence. Garevy had an ankle injury so he could only get one substitute appearance in the 2013 League. He then worked as a mechanic after an injury that left him missing all of the 2013 All Ireland Championship. His club is Mayobridge.
