= Conor Counihan =

Irish Gaelic footballer

Personal information
- Native name: Conchur Ó Cuanacháin (Irish)
- Nickname: Miley
- Born: 28 September 1959 (age 67) Aghada, County Cork, Ireland
- Occupation: CEO of St. Joseph's Foundation
- Height: 5 ft 11 in (180 cm)

Sport
- Sport: Gaelic football
- Position: Centre-back
Clubs
- Years: Club
- Aghada; Imokilly
Club titles
- Cork titles: 2
Inter-county*
Years	County	Apps (scores)
1980–1993	Cork	26 (0-00)
Inter-county titles
- Munster titles: 4
- All-Irelands: 2
- NFL: 1
- All Stars: 2
- *Inter County team apps and scores correct as of 16:48, 6 August 2013.

Conor Counihan (born 28 September 1959) is an Irish former Gaelic footballer who played as a centre-back for the Cork senior team.

Born in Aghada, County Cork, Counihan first played competitive football during his youth. He arrived on the inter-county scene at the age of twenty when he first linked up with the Cork under-21 team, before later lining out with the junior side. He made his senior debut in the 1980–81 National Football League. Counihan went on to win two All-Ireland medals, four Munster medals and three National Football League medals. He was an All-Ireland runner-up on three occasions.

Counihan was a member of the Munster inter-provincial team for six consecutive years. At club level he won two Cork Senior Football Championship medals with divisional side Imokilly, while he also won intermediate and junior championship medals with Aghada.

Throughout his career Counihan made 26 championship appearances for Cork. His retirement came following Cork's defeat by Derry in the 1993 All-Ireland final.

In retirement from playing, Counihan became involved in team management and coaching. He served as a selector and as a backs' coach on the Cork senior football team under both Billy Morgan and Larry Tompkins, while he also led the Aghada senior team. As manager of the Cork senior team for six seasons, he guided the team to the All-Ireland title in 2010.

During his playing days, Counihan won two All-Star awards. In 2009, he was chosen at centre-back on a special Munster football team of the quarter century.

== Playing career ==
=== Club ===
Counihan played club football with Aghada GAA club.

In 1984, Counihan was captain of divisional side Imolkilly as the team reached the final of the county senior championship for the first time ever. Dual kingpins St. Finbarr's provided the opposition, with Imokilly claiming their first ever title with a 2–14 to 2–7 score line.

After surrendering their title the following year, Imokilly were back in the championship decider again in 1986. Once again it was St. Finbarr's who provided the opposition, however, on this occasion the Barr's were the reigning county champions. Imokilly triumphed by 2–4 to 0–9 and Counihan picked up a second championship medal.

In 1989 Counihan won a fourth divisional junior medal of the decade with Aghada. The club later reached the final of the county championship. Knocknagree were the opponents and, after a draw and a replay, Counihan's side won by 0–8 to 0–4, giving him a Cork Junior Football Championship medal.

After just two years at intermediate level, Aghada reached the championship final with Ballincollig providing the opposition. A narrow 0–9 to 0–8 victory gave Counihan an Cork Intermediate Football Championship medal.

=== Under-21 and junior ===
Counihan first came to prominence on the inter-county scene as a member of the Cork under-21 football team in 1980. He won a Munster Under-21 Football Championship medal that year following a 3–15 to 0–4 win over Clare. Cork later qualified for the All-Ireland final. Dublin were beaten by Cork on a 2–8 to 1–5 scoreline, giving Counihan an All-Ireland medal.

In 1984 Counihan was a member of the Cork junior football team. That he won a Munster medal following a 1–12 to 0–9 defeat of Kerry. The subsequent All-Ireland final pitted Cork against English side Warwickshire. Cork won easily by 3–20 to 0–7, giving Counihan an All-Ireland medal.

=== Senior ===
Counihan made his senior debut for Cork during the autumn games of the 1980–81 National Football League. He made his championship debut against Waterford in 1981, but was back on the substitutes' bench for the subsequent Munster final defeat by Kerry.

Over the next few years Counihan was on and off the senior panel. He returned to the starting fifteen as captain for Cork's championship campaign in 1985.

Two years later in 1987, Counihan was captain of Cork for a second time. After a 1–10 to 2–7 Munster final draw with four-in-a-row contenders Kerry, Cork won the replay by 0–13 to 1–5, giving him a first Munster medal. Counihan lined out in his first All-Ireland final on 20 September 1987, with Meath providing the opposition. Meath led by 1–6 to 0–8 at half-time, courtesy of a Colm O'Rourke goal. At the full-time whistle Meath were the winners by 1–14 to 0–11.

Cork retained the provincial title for the first time in fourteen years in 1988, following a narrow 1–14 to 0–16 defeat of Kerry. The game was noted for an incident in which Counihan grabbed Jack O'Shea by the testicles. It was his second consecutive Munster medal. Counihan later lined out in a second All-Ireland final against Meath on 18 September 1988. After a 0–12 to 1–9 draw, the subsequent replay on 9 October 1988 saw Meath's Gerry McEntee being sent-off after just seven minutes. In spite of being reduced to fourteen men, Meath hung on for a narrow 0–13 to 0–12 victory.

In 1989, Cork faced New York in the final of the National League at Gaelic Park. An aggregate score of 3–21 to 2–14 in favour of Cork gave Counihan a National League medal. Cork later made history by securing a third successive Munster title following a 1–12 to 1–9 defeat of Kerry. Mayo faced Cork in the subsequent All-Ireland final on 16 September 1989, as Counihan's side aimed to put an end to their losing streak in All-Ireland finals. The game was a close affair for much of the opening half. An Anthony Finnerty goal after thirty-eight minutes gave Mayo a brief lead, however, the Connacht champions failed to score for the last nineteen minutes. Teddy McCarthy took control and Cork secured victory by 0–17 to 1–11. It was Counihan's first All-Ireland medal and Cork's first championship title since 1973. At the end of the year Counihan was presented with his first All-Star award.

Cork dominated the provincial championship again in 1990. A 2–23 to 1–11 defeat of old rivals Kerry gave Counihan a fourth successive Munster medal. On 16 September 1990 Cork had the chance to retain their All-Ireland title when they faced Meath in the All-Ireland decider. Cork suffered a blow in the first-half when Colm O'Neill was sent off; however, Shay Fahy was playing a blinder at midfield. In spite of only having fourteen men Cork won the game by 0–11 to 0–9. It was a second consecutive All-Ireland medal for Counihan and it was the first time that Cork had achieved back-to-back championships. This victory was all the more special as the Cork hurling team had already won their respective All-Ireland title a fortnight earlier. It was the first time in the modern era that a county had won the hurling and football double. A second consecutive All-Star award quickly followed for Counihan.

Three All-Ireland titles in-a-row proved beyond Cork and Counihan was later confined to the substitutes' bench.

In 1993 Cork regained the Munster title, however, Counihan was an unused sub in the 1–16 to 1–8 defeat of Tipperary. He was later named in the substitutes for the All-Ireland final showdown with Derry on 19 September 1993. Things did not go to plan as "the Rebels" were reduced to fourteen men when Tony Davis was harshly red-carded. Counihan was introduced as a substitute, however, Séamus Downey scored the winning goal as Derry secured their first All-Ireland with a 1–14 to 2–8 victory. Counihan retired from inter-county activity following this defeat.

=== Inter-provincial ===
Counihan also lined out with Munster in the inter-provincial football competition. He played with Munster for six seasons between 1986 and 1992, however, he ended up on the losing side on each occasion and finished his career without a Railway Cup title.

== Coaching career ==
=== Cork selector ===
After retiring from playing, in 1994 Counihan became a selector with Cork manager Billy Morgan. That year Cork retained their Munster title following victory over Tipperary. Cork, however, were subsequently defeated by eventual champions Down in the All-Ireland semi-final.

Five years later, in 1999, Counihan played a role alongside Larry Tompkins as a specialist backs coach and as a selector. The year began with the capture of the National League title following a two-point defeat of Dublin. Cork later reclaimed the Munster title after an absence of four years. An All-Ireland final appearance beckoned, with Meath providing the opposition, in which Cork were beaten by 1–11 to 1–8.

Counihan returned as a backs coach again in 2003, however, Cork were defeated in the championship. Following the resignation of manager Larry Tompkins, Counihan was, at one point, installed as the favourite to succeed him in the position. On that occasion the job went to former manager Billy Morgan.

=== Aghada manager ===
Counihan also had a stint as coach of the senior football team with his own Aghada club. Counihan's side won the All-Ireland Sevens title in 2003 and reached the semi-final of the county championship in 2005. Following that defeat Counihan resigned as coach and became involved in the underage sections of the Aghada club.

=== Cork manager ===
In 2007, when Billy Morgan left as Cork senior football manager, Counihan was one of the favourites to take the post. The post, however, went to Teddy Holland. Following a lengthy strike by the players, Holland was removed as manager without overseeing a single game and Counihan was installed as manager in February 2008.

Counihan was appointed manager at a time when Cork were facing a relegation battle in the National Football League. This occurred as a result of the team forfeiting their first few games because of the strike. Cork fought back immediately under Counihan and their performance in their remaining games ensured their position in Division 2 for the following year. Cork's first outing in the Munster Championship was a semi-final appearance in which Cork scored two late goals to narrowly defeat Limerick. The subsequent provincial decider saw Cork take on reigning All-Ireland champions Kerry for the fourth successive year. Few pundits and commentators gave Counihan's side any chance and at half-time Kerry were cruising by eight points. Cork, however, stormed back in the second half as Kerry could only muster three points and Cork secured a 1–16 to 1–11 victory. Due to the format of the championship both sides met again in the All-Ireland semi-final. After a draw and a replay, Kerry were the team that advanced to the championship decider.

A strike by the Cork hurling team in late 2008 and early 2009 posed a headache for Counihan. In the end, the difficulties were resolved with the resignation of hurling manager Gerald McCarthy, and Counihan's plans for his team were back on track. In the National League campaign, Cork reached the final of Division 2. Monaghan provided the opposition on that occasion, with Cork securing a 1–14 to 0–12 victory and promotion to the top flight of the football league. Cork later qualified for the Munster final against Limerick. Cork won the game by a solitary point on a score line of 2–6 to 0–11. Defeats of Donegal and Tyrone saw Cork reach a second All-Ireland final in three years. Cork played Kerry in the final, and the full-time whistle Kerry were the champions again by 0–16 to 1–9.

Cork recovered from the previous year's All-Ireland defeat by having a successful National League campaign in early 2010. A defeat of Mayo gave Cork their first Division 1 title since 1999. It was another milestone on Counihan's managerial curriculum vitae; however, he still faced criticism over his team selection and relaxed managerial style. A defeat by Kerry in a replay of the provincial semi-final resulted in Cork being exiled to the All-Ireland qualifiers. After negotiating their way through a difficult series of games, Cork defeated Dublin to qualify for their third All-Ireland final in four years. Down provided the opposition on that occasion in the first meeting between these two teams since 1994. At the full-time whistle Cork were the champions by 0–16 to 0–15 and Counihan had finally guided his native county to the All-Ireland, a first in twenty years. This was the end of his first term as manager of the team; however, it was confirmed on 27 October 2010 that he would remain in charge for another two-year term. 2011 started well for Cork as they captured a second consecutive League title following a battle hard performance against Dublin. The defending champions were installed as favourites to retain their title. Those plans were disrupted by a Munster Final defeat to Kerry in Killarney and for the second year in a row Cork had to go through the qualifiers. They met Down again and won comfortably before facing Mayo in the All Ireland quarter final. Despite being favourites yet again, Mayo beat Cork to strip them of their title and knock them out of the championship.

Cork were back on form in 2012, when they retained the league title to make it three out of three National League title. Another Munster title followed following victories over Kerry and Clare. After beating Kildare in the quarter finals, they went out to eventual champions Donegal.

2013 proved to be a tough year for Counihan's team. They failed to retain their league title and later suffered defeat to Kerry in the Munster Final. Their championship ended with defeat to Dublin in the All Ireland quarter final. Counihan stepped down as manager after six years in charge.

== Honours ==
=== Team ===
==== Player ====
Aghada

- Cork Intermediate Football Championship (1): 1991
- Cork Junior Football Championship (1): 1989
- East Cork Junior A Football Championship (4): 1980, 1981, 1983, 1989

Imokilly

- Cork Senior Football Championship (2): 1984, 1986

Cork

- All-Ireland Senior Football Championship (2): 1989, 1990
- Munster Senior Football Championship (4): 1987 (c), 1988, 1989, 1990
- National Football League (1): 1988–89
- All-Ireland Junior Football Championship (1): 1984
- Munster Junior Football Championship (1): 1984
- Munster Under-21 Football Championship (1): 1980
- All-Ireland Under-21 Football Championship (1): 1980

==== Manager ====
Cork

- All-Ireland Senior Football Championship (1): 2010
- Munster Senior Football Championship (3): 2008, 2009, 2012
- National Football League (Division 1) (3): 2010, 2011, 2012
- National Football League (Division 2) (1): 2009

Honours

- Munster Football Team of the Last 25 Years (1984–2009): Centre-back
- All-Star Awards (2): 1989, 1990

Achievements
Preceded by Jack O'Connor (Kerry)	All-Ireland Senior Football Final; 2010	Succeeded by Pat Gilroy (Dublin)
Sporting positions
Preceded by Jimmy Kerrigan	Cork Senior Football Captain; 1985	Succeeded by John Kerins
Preceded by John Kerins	Cork Senior Football Captain; 1987	Succeeded by Tony Nation
Preceded by Teddy Holland	Cork Senior Football Manager; 2008–2013	Succeeded by Brian Cuthbert
