= 2010 All-Ireland Senior Football Championship =

Football championship

Championship details
- Dates: 2 May – 19 September 2010
- Teams: 33

All-Ireland Champions
- Winning team: Cork (7th win)
- Captain: Graham Canty
- Manager: Conor Counihan

All-Ireland Finalists
- Losing team: Down
- Captain: Brendan Coulter and Ambrose Rogers
- Manager: James McCartan Jnr

Provincial Champions
- Munster: Kerry
- Leinster: Meath
- Ulster: Tyrone
- Connacht: Roscommon

Championship statistics
- No. matches played: 64
- Goals total: 107 (1.67 per game)
- Points total: 1638 (25.59 per game)
- Top Scorer: Johnny Doyle (1–49)
- Player of the Year: Bernard Brogan

The 2010 All-Ireland Senior Football Championship was the 124th edition of the GAA's premier inter-county Gaelic football tournament, played between 31 of the 32 counties of Ireland plus London and New York.

The draw for the championship took place on 22 October 2009. The championship began on 2 May 2010 and concluded with the All-Ireland final at Croke Park on 19 September 2010. Cork defeated Down by 0–16 to 0–15 to win their seventh All-Ireland senior title, and their first since 1990.

The 2010 championship was unusual in that all four provincial champions (Kerry, Meath, Roscommon and Tyrone) were knocked out in the All-Ireland quarter-finals, and all four provincial runners-up (Limerick, Louth, Sligo and Monaghan) were eliminated in the fourth and final round of the All-Ireland qualifiers. Kerry and Sligo were defeated by Down, Meath and Monaghan by Kildare, Roscommon and Limerick by Cork, and Tyrone and Louth by Dublin. Cork then defeated Dublin in the first All-Ireland semi-final, before Down defeated Kildare in the second.

== Format ==
Four knockout (single elimination format) provincial championships were played. London and New York competed in Connacht. The four provincial champions advanced to the All-Ireland quarter-finals.

- The 16 teams eliminated before reaching a provincial semi-final competed in Round One of the Qualifiers (New York did not compete). The eight winners of Round One advanced to Round Two.
  - Qualifiers, Round Two: The eight teams eliminated in provincial semi-finals each played one of the eight winners of Round One.
  - Qualifiers, Round Three: The eight winners of Round Two played off to reduce the number to four.
  - Qualifiers, Round Four: The four teams eliminated in provincial finals each played one of the four winners of Round Three.
- All-Ireland Quarter-Finals: The four provincial champions each played one of the four winners of Round Four.
- The winners of the All-Ireland Quarter-Finals then advanced to the semi-finals, and the winners of the semi-finals went on to the 2010 All-Ireland Senior Football Championship Final.

== Provincial championships ==
=== Munster Senior Football Championship ===
Quarter-finals
Waterford | 1–10
Clare | 0–9
Tipperary | 2–6
Kerry | 2–18

Semi-finals
Limerick | 1–17
Waterford | 1–9
Cork | 1–14
Kerry | 1–15

Munster final
Limerick | 1–14
Kerry | 1–17

4 July 2010
Final

| Limerick | 1–14 – 1–17 | Kerry |
|---|---|---|
| G Collins 0–5, J Galvin 1–2, B Scanlon, J Ryan 0–2 each, J O'Donovan, S Kelly, S Buckley 0–1 each | Report | C Cooper 1–5, Declan O'Sullivan 0–3, B Sheehan, M McCarthy, T O Se 0–2 each, Darran O'Sullivan, M Quirke, D Moran 0-01 each |

FitzGerald Stadium, Killarney
Referee: P. Fox (Westmeath)

=== Leinster Senior Football Championship ===
Preliminary round
Louth | 1–11
Longford | 1–7
Wicklow | 3–13
Carlow | 0–12
Meath | 1–20
Offaly | 2–7

Quarter-finals
Louth | 1–22
Kildare | 1–16
Wicklow | 1–11
Westmeath | 0–15
Meath | 2–14
Laois | 0–10
Wexford | 0–15
Dublin | 2–16

Semi-finals
Louth | 1–15
Westmeath | 2–10
Meath | 5–9
Dublin | 0–13

Leinster final
Louth | 1–10
Meath | 1–12

11 July 2010
Final

| Louth | 1–10 – 1–12 | Meath |
|---|---|---|
| B White 0–4, JP Rooney 1–1, C Judge 0–2, P Keenan, A Reed, A McDonnell 0–1 each | Report | G Reilly, C Ward 0–4 each, J Sheridan 1–0, S Bray 0–2, A Moyles 0–1 |

Croke Park, Dublin
Attendance: 48,875
Referee: M. Sludden (Tyrone)

=== Connacht Senior Football Championship ===
Quarter-finals
New York | 0–12
Galway | 2–13
Sligo | 0–15
Mayo | 1–8
London | 0–6
Roscommon | 0–14

Semi-finals
Galway | 0–16
Sligo | 1–14
Leitrim | 0–11
Roscommon | 1–13

Connacht final
Sligo | 0–13
Roscommon | 0–14

18 July 2010
Final

| Sligo | 0–13 – 0–14 | Roscommon |
|---|---|---|
| A Costello 0–5, A Marren 0–3, M Breheny 0–2, C McGee, C Harrison, S Davey 0–1 each | Report | D Shine 0–10, D Casey, C Cregg, D Keenan, D O'Gara 0–1 each |

McHale Park, Castlebar
Referee: J. White (Donegal)

=== Ulster Senior Football Championship ===
Preliminary round
Derry | 1–7
Armagh | 1–10

Quarter-finals
Antrim | 1–13
Tyrone | 2–14
Donegal | 2–10
Down | 1–15
Cavan | 0–13
Fermanagh | 1–13
Monaghan | 1–18
Armagh | 0–9

Semi-finals
Tyrone | 0–14
Down | 0–10
Fermanagh | 2–8
Monaghan | 0–21

Ulster final
Tyrone | 1–14
Monaghan | 0–7

18 July 2010
Final

| Tyrone | 1–14 – 0–7 | Monaghan |
|---|---|---|
| C Cavanagh 1–0, S Cavanagh 0–3, K Hughes, D Harte, M Penrose 0–2 each, T McGuigan, C Gormley, B Dooher, P Jordan, Joe McMahon 0–1 each | Report | C McManus 0–2, T Freeman, P Finlay, R Woods, D Clerkin, D Mone 0–1 each |

St. Tiernach's Park, Clones
Attendance: 34,000
Referee: D. Coldrick (Meath)

== All-Ireland Qualifiers ==
=== Round 1 ===
The 16 teams which failed to reach a provincial semi-final took part in Round 1 of the qualifiers (New York do not compete). A draw was held on 13 June 2010 to decide which of these teams would face each other.

| 26 June 2010 Round 1 | Carlow | 2-9 - 1-18 | Derry | Dr Cullen Park, Carlow |
| | D St Ledger 1-4, M Carpenter 1-1, S Rea 0-2, S Gannon, P Broderick 0–1 each | Report | E Bradley 1–6, M Lynch 0–4, J Kielt 0–3, M Craig, C McKeever, E McGuckian, E Muldoon, D Mullan 0–1 each | Referee: M. Condon (Waterford) |

| 26 June 2010 Round 1 | Kildare | 0–15 – 0–15; AET | Antrim | St. Conleth's Park, Newbridge |
| | J Doyle 0–7, P O'Neill, R Sweeney 0–2 each, E Bolton, J Kavanagh, G White, E O'Flaherty 0–1 each | Report | P Cunningham 0–10, K McGourty 0–3, K O'Boyle, T McCann 0–1 each | Referee: M. Deegan (Laois) |

| 26 June 2010 Round 1 | Offaly | 2–18 – 1–18; AET | Clare | O'Connor Park, Tullamore |
| | K Casey 1–4, N McNamee 0–5, D Egan 1–1, C McManus 0–3, K Slattery, B Geraghty, J Reynolds, A Sullivan, G Guilfoyle 0–1 each | Report | D Tubridy 0–12, K Cahill 1–1, G Brennan, A Clohessy, D Molohan, G Kelly 0–1 each | Referee: M. Higgins (Fermanagh) |

| 26 June 2010 Round 1 | Mayo | 0–14 – 1–12 | Longford | Pearse Park, Longford |
| | A Freeman 0–5, A Dillon 0–4, A Moran 0–2, S O'Shea, C Mortimer, B Moran 0–1 each | Report | F McGee 0–5, B Kavanagh 0–4, P Kelly 1–0, S Mulligan, K Mulligan, P Dowd 0–1 each | Referee: G. Kinneavy (Galway) |

| 26 June 2010 Round 1 | Armagh | 2–14 – 0–11 | Donegal | Crossmaglen |
| | J Clarke 2–2, A Kernan, G Swift, S McDonnell 0–3 each, J Feeney 0–2, C Vernon 0–1 | Report | M Murphy 0–7, N Gallagher, M McHugh, C McFadden, A Hanlon 0–1 each | Referee: M. Duffy (Sligo) |

| 26 June 2010 Round 1 | Cavan | 0–15 – 2–8 | Wicklow | Breffni Park, Cavan |
| | S Johnston 0–6, G Smith 0–4, R Flanagan 0–2, E McGuigan, M McKeever, A Clarke 0–1 each | Report | T Hannon 0–5, L Glynn, S Furlong 1–0 each, N Mernagh, P Cunningham, P Earls 0–1 each | Referee: C. Reilly (Meath) |

| 27 June 2010 Round 1 | Wexford | 4–22 – 0–9 | London | Ruislip |
| | PJ Banville 2–4, M Forde 0–7, S Roche 1–2, C Lyng 0–4, A Doyle 1–0, D Murphy, B Malone, D Waters, B Doyle, R Barry 0–1 each | Report | D Horan 0–2, S Conroy, C Eastwood, B Smyth, D Hayden, K Phair, N Egan, S McVeigh 0–1 each | Referee: D. Fahy (Longford) |

| 27 June 2010 Round 1 | Tipperary | 0–13 – 0–12 | Laois | Semple Stadium, Thurles |
| | B Grogan 0–7, P Acheson, B Mulvihill 0–2 each, G Hannigan, S Hahessy 0–1 each | Report | J O'Loughlin, P Clancy, D Kingston 0–2 each, P McMahon, B Sheehan, N Donoher, MJ Tierney, R Munnelly, C Rogers 0–1 each | Attendance: 1,367; Referee: M. Collins (Cork) |

| 3 July 2010 Round 1 Replay | Antrim | 0–9 – 1–15 | Kildare | Casement Park, Belfast |
| | P Cunningham 0–7, K Brady, B Herron 0–1 each | Report | J Doyle 1–6, E Callaghan 0–2, M O'Flaherty, R Sweeney, E O'Flaherty, D Earley, P O'Neill, K Cribben, D Flynn 0–1 each | Referee: J. McQuillan (Cavan) |

=== Round 2 ===
The draw for Round 2 was held on 28 June 2010. The eight Round 1 winners were each drawn against one of the losing provincial semi-finalists.

| 10 July 2010 Round 2 | Kildare | 1-12 - 0-6 | Leitrim | St. Conleth's Park, Newbridge |
| | J Kavanagh 1-4, J Doyle 0-3, H Lynch, E Callaghan, M O'Flaherty, P O'Neill, R Sweeney 0–1 each | Report | M Foley 0–3, R Mulvey, S Canning, D Sweeney 0–1 each | Referee: C. Reilly (Meath) |

| 10 July 2010 Round 2 | Dublin | 1–21 – 1–13 | Tipperary | Croke Park, Dublin |
| | B Brogan 0–7, A Brogan 0–4, M MacAuley 1–1, C Keaney 0–3, R McConnell 0–2, S Cluxton, E Fennell, E O'Gara, K McManamon 0–1 each | Report | B Grogan 1–5, P Austin, C Sweeney 0–3 each, S Hahessy, B Coen 0–1 each | Referee: P. McEnaney (Monaghan) |

| 10 July 2010 Round 2 | Cork | 1–19 – 0–4 | Cavan | Páirc Uí Chaoimh, Cork |
| | D Goulding 0–8, C O'Neill 0–4, P Kelly 0–3, P O'Neill 1–0, C Sheehan 0–2, F Goold, D Kavanagh 0–1 each | Report | R Flanagan 0–2, C Mackey, S Johnston 0–1 each | Referee: S. Doyle (Wexford) |

| 10 July 2010 Round 2 | Offaly | 0–15 – 0–10 | Waterford | O'Connor Park, Tullamore |
| | N McNamee 0–5, C McManus 0–3, G Guilfoyle, A Sullivan 0–2 each, K Casey, B Connor, R Brady 0–1 each | Report | G Hurney 0–5, C McGrath 0–2, S Briggs, M Donnelly, P Hurney 0–1 each | Referee: A. Mangan (Kerry) |

| 10 July 2010 Round 2 | Galway | 0–13 – 1–11 | Wexford | Pearse Stadium, Salthill |
| | P Joyce 0–6, C Bane 0–4, G O'Donnell, M Clancy, S Armstrong 0–1 each | Report | C Lyng 1–6, A Flynn, E Bradley, C Morris, R Barry, M Forde 0–1 each | Referee: J. White (Donegal) |

| 10 July 2010 Round 2 | Down | 1–14 – 1–10 | Longford | Páirc Esler, Newry |
| | M Clarke 1–5, D Hughes, M Poland 0–3 each, B Coulter, J Clarke, D Rooney 0–1 each | Report | F McGee 1–7, P Barden 0–2, N Farrell 0–1 | Referee: M. Higgins (Fermanagh) |

| 10 July 2010 Round 2 | Westmeath | 1–7 – 0–13 | Derry | Cusack Park, Mullingar |
| | D Dolan 0–4, M Flanagan 1–0, M Ennis, D Duffy, P Bannon 0–1 each | Report | J Kielt, M Lynch 0–5 each, E Bradley 0–2, R Wilkinson 0–1 | Referee: M. Duffy (Sligo) |

| 11 July 2010 Round 2 | Fermanagh | 0–7 – 0–11 | Armagh | Brewster Park, Enniskillen |
| | S Quigley 0–5, B Cox, T McElroy 0–1 each | Report | S McDonnell 0–6, J Clarke, C Vernon 0–2 each, G Swift 0–1 | Referee: D. Fahy (Longford) |

=== Round 3 ===
The draw for Round 3 was held on 11 July 2010. The eight Round 2 winners play-off to reduce the number of teams to four.

| 17 July 2010 Round 3 | Dublin | 0-14 - 0-11 | Armagh | Croke Park, Dublin |
| | B Brogan 0-9, S Cluxton, K McManamon, P McMahon, P Flynn, E Fennell 0–1 each | Report | S McDonnell 0–5, C McKeever, A Kernan, J Clarke, B Mallon, M Mackin, J Feeney 0–1 each | Referee: J. McQuillan (Cavan) |

| 18 July 2010 Round 3 | Wexford | 0–5 – 0–12 | Cork | Wexford Park, Wexford |
| | A Flynn, E Bradley, C Lyng, M Forde, B Brosnan 0–1 each | Report | P Kelly 0–4, D Goulding 0–3, C Sheehan 0–2, G Canty, A Walsh, J Miskella 0–1 each | Referee: G. Kinneavy (Galway) |

| 17 July 2010 Round 3 | Derry | 1–9 – 2–17 | Kildare | Celtic Park, Derry |
| | E Bradley 0–3, R Wilkinson 1–0, J Kielt, M Lynch 0–2 each, E Muldoon, D Mullan 0–1 each | Report | J Doyle 0–8, E Callaghan 1–4, A Smith 1–0, P O'Neill 0–2, H McGrillen, E Bolton, E O'Flaherty 0–1 each | Referee: M. Duffy (Sligo) |

| 17 July 2010 Round 3 | Offaly | 1–10 – 1–12 | Down | O'Connor Park, Tullamore |
| | K Casey 1–1, R Brady, B Connor, C McManus 0–2 each, A Sullivan, J Reynolds, N McNamee 0–1 each | Report | M Clarke 0–5, A Carr 1–0, M Poland 0–3, J Clarke 0–2, B Coulter, D Hughes 0–1 each | Referee: M. Duffy (Sligo) |

=== Round 4 ===
The draw for Round 4 was held on 18 July 2010. The four Round 3 winners were each drawn against one of the losing provincial finalists.

| 24 July 2010 Round 4 | Louth | 0-13 - 2-14 | Dublin | Croke Park, Dublin |
| | B White, D Clarke 0-3 each, D Byrne, P Keenan 0-2 each, A McDonnell, S Lennon, D Maguire 0–1 each | Report | E O'Gara 2–1, B Cullen, B Brogan 0–3 each, S Cluxton 0–2, G Brennan, R McConnell, A Brogan, P Flynn, T Quinn 0–1 each | Referee: P. McEnaney (Monaghan) |

| 24 July 2010 Round 4 | Limerick | 1–11 – 0–16; AET | Cork | Gaelic Grounds, Limerick |
| | G Collins 1–4, S Lavin 0–2, J Ryan, C Fitzgerald, B Scanlon, S Kelly, I Ryan 0–1 each | Report | D Goulding 0–7, D O'Connor, C O'Neill 0–2 each, D Kavanagh, A Walsh, C Sheehan, A O'Connor, P Kelly 0–1 each | Referee: P. Hughes (Armagh) |

| 24 July 2010 Round 4 | Monaghan | 1–11 – 1–15 | Kildare | Croke Park, Dublin |
| | H McElroy 1–0, P Finlay 0–3, D Freeman, D Hughes, O Lennon, K Hughes, C Hanratty, C McManus, T Freeman, S Gollogly 0–1 each | Report | J Kavanagh 0–5, R Sweeney 1–1, J Doyle, E Callaghan, E O'Flaherty 0–2 each, E Bolton, D Flynn, A Smith 0–1 each | Referee: J. White (Donegal) |

| 24 July 2010 Round 4 | Sligo | 0–10 – 3–20 | Down | Breffni Park, Cavan |
| | A Marren 0–4, S Coen, D Kelly, C McGee 0–2 each | Report | R Murtagh 1–5, J Clarke, A Rogers 1–1 each, M Clarke 0–4, D Hughes 0–3, M Poland 0–2, K McKernan, P Fitzpatrick, P McComiskey, C Garvey 0–1 each | Referee: M. Deegan (Laois) |

== All-Ireland Senior Football Championship ==
Quarter-Finals
Roscommon | 0–10
Cork | 1–16
Tyrone | 0–13
Dublin | 1–15
Meath | 1–12
Kildare | 2–17
Kerry | 1–10
Down | 1–16

Semi-Finals
Cork | 1–15
Dublin | 1–14
Kildare | 1–14
Down | 1–16

All-Ireland Final
Cork | 0–16
Down | 0–15

=== Quarter-finals ===
31 July 2010
Quarter-final

| Kerry | 1–10 – 1–16 | Down |
|---|---|---|
| C Cooper 0–7, B Sheehan 0–3, D Moran 1–0 | Report | M Poland 1–2, M Clarke 0–4, B Coulter 0–3, P McComiskey, A Rodgers 0–3 each, C Maginn, R Murtagh, P Fitzpatrick 0–1 each |

Croke Park, Dublin
Attendance: 62,749
Referee: J. McQuillan (Cavan)

31 July 2010
Quarter-final

| Tyrone | 0–13 – 1–15 | Dublin |
|---|---|---|
| M Penrose, O Mulligan 0–5 each, P Jordan 0–2, B McGuigan 0–1 | Report | B Brogan 0–9, E O'Gara 1–0, B Cullen, S Cluxton, P McMahon, A Brogan, C Keaney, M MacAuley 0–1 each |

Croke Park, Dublin
Attendance: 62,749
Referee: D. Coldrick (Meath)

1 August 2010
Quarter-final

| Roscommon | 0–10 – 1–16 | Cork |
|---|---|---|
| D Shine 0–5, M Finneran, K Mannion, D O'Gara, J Rogers, G Heneghan 0–1 each | Report | D Goulding 0–6, P O'Neill 1–2, D O'Connor 0–3, P Kerrigan, C Sheehan 0–2 each, G Canty 0–1 |

Croke Park, Dublin
Attendance: 47,016
Referee: C. Reilly (Meath)

1 August 2010
Quarter-final

| Meath | 1–12 – 2–17 | Kildare |
|---|---|---|
| C Ward 1–2, J Sheridan 0–3, G Reilly, S O'Rourke 0–2 each, C O'Connor, B Meade, J Queeney 0–1 each | Report | J Doyle 0–8, E O'Flaherty 0–5, J Kavanagh 1–1, A Smith 1–0, P O'Neill 0–2, E Bolton 0–1 |

Croke Park, Dublin
Attendance: 47,016
Referee: M. Duffy (Sligo)

=== Semi-finals ===
22 August 2010
Semi-final

| Cork | 1–15 – 1–14 | Dublin |
|---|---|---|
| D O'Connor 1–5, D Goulding 0–4, P Kelly 0–2, A Walsh, P Kerrigan, C O'Neill, D Kavanagh 0–1 each | Report | B Brogan 1–7, A Brogan 0–2, P McMahon, R McConnell, M MacAuley, B Cullen, C Keaney 0–1 each |

Croke Park, Dublin
Attendance: 82,225
Referee: M. Deegan (Laois)

29 August 2010
Semi-final

| Kildare | 1–14 – 1–16 | Down |
|---|---|---|
| J Doyle 0–6, E Callaghan 1–1, H Lynch 0–2, M O'Flaherty, E Bolton, J Kavanagh, K Ennis, D Lyons 0–1 each | Report | B Coulter 1–2, M Clarke, M Poland 0–3 each, K McKernan, D Hughes 0–2 each, P Fitzpatrick, P McComiskey, C Maginn, R Murtagh 0–1 each |

Croke Park, Dublin
Attendance: 62,182
Referee: P. McEnaney (Monaghan)

=== Final ===
19 September 2010
Final

| Cork | 0–16 – 0–15 | Down |
|---|---|---|
| D Goulding 0–9, D O'Connor 0–5, P Kerrigan, C Sheehan 0–1 each | Report | D Hughes, P McComiskey, M Clarke 0–3 each, K McKernan, P Fitzpatrick, M Poland, B Coulter, J Clarke, R Murtagh 0–1 each |

Croke Park, Dublin
Attendance: 81,604
Referee: D. Coldrick (Meath)

== Championship statistics ==
=== Miscellaneous ===
- Louth reach their first Leinster final since 1960.
- For the first time since 1947 neither Mayo or Galway contested the Connacht final.
- Kerry lost their first All-Ireland Quarter-final against Down.
- All of the provincial champions were defeated in the quarter-finals, and thus all the semi-finalists were from the qualifiers. This is the only time this has happened since the qualifier system was introduced in 2001.
- Down reach their first All-Ireland final since 1994.

=== Scoring ===
- First goal of the championship: Pádraic Joyce for Galway against New York (Connacht Quarter Final)
- Last goal of the championship: Eamon Callaghan for Kildare against Down (All Ireland Semi Final)
- Widest winning margin: 25 points
  - Wexford 4–22 – 0–9 London (Qualifiers Round 1)
- Most goals in a match: 5
  - Dublin 0–13 – 5–9 Meath (Leinster Semi Final)
- Most points in a match: 38
  - Louth 1–22 – 1–16 Kildare (Leinster Quarter Final)
- Most goals by one team in a match: 5
  - Dublin 0–13 – 5–9 Meath (Leinster Semi Final)
- Most goals scored by a losing team: 2
  - Offaly 2–7 – 1–20 Meath (Leinster Preliminary Round)
  - Tipperary 2–6 – 2–18 Kerry (Munster Quarter Final)
  - Donegal 2–10 – 1–15 Down (Ulster Quarter Final)
  - Carlow 2–9 – 1–18 Derry (Qualifiers Round 1)
  - Cavan 0–15 – 2–8 Wicklow (Qualifiers Round 1)
  - Fermanagh 2–8 – 0–21 Monaghan (Ulster Semi Final)
- Most points scored by a losing team: 18
  - Clare 1–18 – 2–18 Offaly (Qualifiers Round 1)

=== Top scorers ===
Season

| | Name | Team | Tally | Total | Games | Average |
|---|---|---|---|---|---|---|
| 1 | John Doyle | Kildare | 1–49 | 52 | 8 | 6.5 |
| 2 | Bernard Brogan | Dublin | 3–42 | 51 | 6 | 8.5 |
| 3 | Daniel Goulding | Cork | 1–39 | 42 | 7 | 6 |
| 4 | Donal Shine | Roscommon | 1–32 | 35 | 4 | 8.75 |
| 5 | Martin Clarke | Down | 1–30 | 33 | 8 | 4.13 |
| 6 | Colm Cooper | Kerry | 1–27 | 30 | 5 | 6 |
| 7 | Cian Ward | Meath | 2–23 | 29 | 6 | 4.83 |
| 8 | Pádraic Joyce | Galway | 1–23 | 26 | 4 | 6.5 |
| 9 | Bryan Sheehan | Kerry | 2–19 | 25 | 5 | 5 |
| 10 | Joe Sheridan | Meath | 5–11 | 26 | 6 | 3.83 |

Single game

| | Name | Tally | Total | County | | Opposition |
|---|---|---|---|---|---|---|
| 1 | David Tubridy | 0–12 | 12 | Clare | v | Offaly |
| 2 | Donal Shine | 1–8 | 11 | Roscommon | v | Leitrim |
| 2 | Bryan Sheehan | 2–5 | 11 | Kerry | v | Tipperary |
| 4 | Paddy Cunningham | 0–10 | 10 | Antrim | v | Kildare |
| 4 | Francis McGee | 1–7 | 10 | Longford | v | Down |
| 4 | Bernard Brogan | 2–4 | 10 | Dublin | v | Wexford |
| 4 | PJ Banville | 2–4 | 10 | Wexford | v | London |
| 4 | Donal Shine | 0–10 | 10 | Roscommon | v | Sligo |

== Awards ==
Monthly

| Month | Vodafone Player of the Month | | Opel GPA Player of the Month | |
| Month | Player | County | Player | County |
|---|---|---|---|---|
| May | Benny Coulter | Down | Benny Coulter | Down |
| June | Paddy Keenan | Louth | David Kelly | Sligo |
| July | Eamonn Callaghan | Kildare | James Kavanagh | Kildare |
| August | Martin Clarke | Down | Bernard Brogan | Dublin |
| September | Aidan Walsh | Cork | Daniel Goulding | Cork |
