= John Clarke (Gaelic footballer) =

Irish Gaelic footballer

Personal information
- Born: County Down, Northern Ireland
- Height: 6 ft 0 in (183 cm)

Sport
- Sport: Gaelic football
- Position: Full forward/half back
Club
- Years: Club
- 1999 – present: An Riocht
Club titles
- Down titles: 2
Inter-county
- Years: County
- 2001-2011: Down
Inter-county titles
- Ulster titles: 1
- All-Irelands: 1
- NFL: 0

John Clarke is a Gaelic footballer from County Down, Northern Ireland. He plays for the Down senior inter-county football team and with his local club St Johns GAA.

Clarke made 108 appearances for Down between League and Championship. He started at full forward and scored a point in the 2010 All-Ireland Football Final where Down were defeated 0–15 to 0-16 by Cork. A versatile player, He played corner back in 2003 Ulster final draw and subsequent replay defeat to Tyrone. He is the older brother of Martin Clarke .

== Club ==
Clarke back to back Down Minor Football Championships 2000 2001. In 2006 he helped An Riocht to a Division 2 title in the 2007 he helped them to the club's first ever Division 1 title beating Kilcoo. However, in 2008 the club lost there title and went back to Division 2. 2009 he collected his second Division 2 title beating Ballyholland Harps 1–14 to 2-08. Currently plying his trade with Down Division 2 Side St Johns Drumnaquoile after moving from An Riocht in 2015.

== Honours ==
- 2 Down Minor Championship 2000 2001
- 1 Down Division 1 Football League 2007
- 2 Down Division 2 Football League 2006 2009
- 1 Ulster Minor Football Championship 1999
- 1 All-Ireland Minor Football Championship 1999
- 1 Dr McKenna Cup 2008
