= Mark Poland =

Irish Gaelic footballer

Mark Poland is an Irish Gaelic footballer who played in the 2010 All-Ireland Final.

Poland was part of the team that lost an All-Ireland Under-21 Football Championship final in 2005. The following year he made his first senior championship appearance, as a substitute, in a game against Sligo. He made 33 further championship appearances to give him a total of 34 championship appearances by the time he had finished in 2017 and contributed a total score of 3–46 before retiring, along the way losing heavy in two provincial finals in 2012 and 2017. He was included in the squad for Match for Michaela in 2012. Poland took Warrenpoint's reins, according to an announcement in November 2022.
