= Dick Clerkin =

Monaghan Gaelic footballer

Sport
- Sport: Hurling, Gaelic football
- Position: Midfield
Club
- Years: Club
- Currin
Inter-county
Years	County	Apps (scores)
1999–2016	Monaghan	179 or 180
Inter-county titles
- Ulster titles: 2
- NFL: 2 (Division 2)
- All Stars: 1 (Ulster, 2010)

Dick Clerkin is a Gaelic footballer who plays for Currin and, previously, at senior level for the Monaghan county team.

He ended 17 years with Monaghan in 2016 as the longest-serving inter-county footballer, with his debut in 1999, with two Ulster Championship medals in his back pocket and two National League Division 2 crowns in his other pocket. All in all he played 179 or 180 appearances for Monaghan (all the reports give different numbers), most of it in midfield, and also played his club football for Currin. He gave his retirement speech to the Irish Examiner, confirming the end of the last player left from the 1990s. His last day out was a qualifier defeat to Longford in 2016.

Clerkin was Monaghan's only winner of an Ulster All-Star in 2010, where he was paired with Ambrose Rogers in midfield.
