= PJ Banville =

Irish hurler and Gaelic footballer

Personal information
- Born: Wexford, Ireland

Sport
- Sport: Gaelic Football
- Position: Full Forward
Club
- Years: Club
- Horeswood
Club titles
- Wexford titles: 4
Inter-county
- Years: County
- 2005–2014 2015–: Wexford; New York
Inter-county titles
- NFL: 1

PJ Banville is a Gaelic footballer from County Wexford, Ireland. He plays with the Wexford inter-county team and his club side Horeswood.

He was part of the Wexford side in 2008 that proved to be a very successful year for the county. Wexford won Division 3 of the National League, beating Fermanagh in the final. Having beaten Meath and Laois, they reached that year's Leinster Championship final, but were comprehensively beaten by Dublin.

However subsequent victories over Down and Armagh, meant Wexford reached the All-Ireland semi-final. In the semi-final they lost to eventual All-Ireland champions Tyrone.

He also played soccer with Waterford United F.C.
