= 2010 All-Ireland Senior Football Championship final =

2010 All-Ireland Football Championship final
- Event: 2010 All-Ireland Senior Football Championship
Cork	Down
0–16	0–15
- Date: 19 September 2010
- Venue: Croke Park, Dublin
- Man of the Match: Daniel Goulding
- Referee: David Coldrick (Meath)
- Attendance: 81,604
- Weather: Mostly Cloudy; 17 °C (63 °F)

The 2010 All-Ireland Football Championship final was the 123rd event of its kind. The last Gaelic football match of the 2010 All-Ireland Senior Football Championship, it was played between Cork and Down on 19 September 2010 in Croke Park, Dublin.

Cork won the game, to secure a first All-Ireland SFC title since 1990. It was their seventh title in total. This made them the sixth team in two decades to win both the league and championship in the same season. It was the first time since the 2002 final – when Armagh won their first title – that a team other than Kerry or Tyrone were champions.

This was the last occasion on which iconic broadcaster Mícheál Ó Muircheartaigh commentated on a final to a global audience, having announced his retirement days earlier after a six-decade career.

The game was watched by the highest television audience for an All-Ireland SFC final in five years.

== History ==
This was the first meeting between the sides in an All-Ireland SFC final. The one previous All-Ireland SFC match between the two sides was a semi-final in 1994 which Down won. They had not met in the National Football League for more than a decade.

2010 was Cork's fifth appearance in the All-Ireland SFC final since 1993, the most recent of these being 2007 and 2009. They last won the title in 1990.

Down had less experience approaching the match, having not featured in a final of any description since the 2003 Ulster Senior Football Championship. They last appeared in the All-Ireland SFC final in 1994. Down had however beaten Kerry, the reigning All-Ireland Senior Football Champions, in their 2010 quarter-final. Ahead of the 2010 final, Down had also won all five All-Ireland SFC finals in which they had featured throughout their history. Were they to have defeated Cork they would have had the same number of All-Ireland Senior Football Championship titles as Cork at this point. Cork defeated Dublin in their semi-final, while Down defeated Kildare in theirs.

The game "truly divided" families who took opposing sides.

Prior to the senior final, Tyrone defeated Cork in the minor final by one point.

== Pre-match ==
=== Kit ===
On Monday 30 August 2010, the GAA's Central Competitions Control Committee announced that both teams would play in their away kits due to both home kits being red. This meant that Cork would play in a predominantly white kit with a red trim, while Down would play in a predominantly yellow kit with a red and black trim. This is a similar arrangement to what occurred when Cork and Down played in a semi-final of the 1994 All-Ireland Senior Football Championship. 2010 represented the first occasion since Kerry and Offaly played in the 1982 final that both teams playing in the All-Ireland SFC final donned alternative strips, whilst the 2004 final was the last time one team (Mayo) wore an alternative strip (versus Kerry).

=== Tickets ===
Tickets were reported to be selling for €400 on eBay during the weekend of the final. Planes, trains and buses from Cork were said to have been fully booked, with Iarnród Éireann commissioning five additional trains to Dublin due to "phenomenal demand".

=== Retirement of Mícheál Ó Muircheartaigh ===
Legendary commentator Mícheál Ó Muircheartaigh, who had covered Gaelic games for seven decades, announced his impending retirement on the Thursday before the 2010 All-Ireland SFC final, but not before performing on his final final of the All-Ireland SFC. He appeared as a guest on both The Late Late Show (television) and Miriam Meets... (radio) ahead of the final.

=== Rocky the Chicken ===
Ahead of the game, Rocky the Chicken, who achieved national recognition for successfully predicting 2010 All-Ireland Championship results, opted for Cork as the winner of the 2010 All-Ireland SFC final.

=== Convoy protests ===
The Croke Park Streets Committee (CPSC) intended to protest what they perceived to be the Gaelic Athletic Association's ignorance of the wishes of local residents by staging a vehicular demonstration outside Croke Park on All-Ireland Final day. They cancelled ahead of the event however, after Cork fans objected to possible disruption, instead protesting at the stadium the day before.

=== Team selection ===
Down named the same team that defeated Kildare in the semi-final. Cork named Eoin Cadogan and Graham Canty to start in the final, with Canty serving as team captain. Cadogan had not started the semi-final but came on in Canty's place when Canty wounded his knee. John Miskella was not to play instead. On final day itself Canty was ruled out of the starting team. Miskella started in his place.

== Match ==
=== Summary ===
==== First half ====
Ciarán Sheehan of Cork's goal-bound effort was saved by Brendan McVeigh, Down's goalkeeper, in the first minute. Down were leading by 0–7 to 0–2 after 27 minutes. Cork's two points in this period included a free taken by Daniel Goulding. In the 32nd minute, Goulding was also the player to score Cork's first point from open play. Cork's Donncha O'Connor also contributed to reducing the gap between the sides as half-time approached. At half-time Cork were behind by three points, having scored 0–5 to Down's 0–8.

As of December 2024, it remains the last time that a winning team has been 5+ points behind at any stage in a football final. It was the 14th football final ever where this happened.

==== Second half ====
In the second half Cork were the dominant team. This was helped by the addition of two of Cork's more experienced players to the game: Nicholas Murphy was brought on as a substitute at half-time by Cork manager Conor Counihan, while Graham Canty was brought on as a substitute soon afterwards. In the 56th minute, Paul Kerrigan gave Cork back the lead which they relinquished after five minutes, with Goulding boosting this lead by scoring three '45s. Down's Benny Coulter and Daniel Hughes scored in the dying minutes, but it was too late, even though there was just a single point between the sides. Cork were victorious.

For Cork, Daniel Goulding scored a total of nine points and Donncha O'Connor scored a total of five points. Cork won by a scoreline of 0–16 to 0–15. Goulding was declared "Man of the Match" by The Sunday Game panel.

=== Broadcast ===
The game was broadcast on television via The Sunday Game on RTÉ2 as well as worldwide on RTÉ Radio 1 and RTÉ Raidió na Gaeltachta and on RTÉ.ie. It was also broadcast by the BBC on radio, television and online.

=== Details ===
19 September 2010
15:30 UTC+1

Cork	0–16 – 0–15	Down
D Goulding 0–9; D O'Connor 0–5; P Kerrigan 0–1; C Sheehan 0–1	Report	D Hughes 0–3; P McComiskey 0–3; M Clarke 0–3; K McKernan 0–1; P Fitzpatrick 0–1; M Poland 0–1; B Coulter 0–1; J Clarke 0–1; R Murtagh 0–1

Croke Park, Dublin
Attendance: 81,604
Referee: David Coldrick (Meath)

Cork	Down

CORK:
1	Alan Quirke
2	Eoin Cadogan
3	Michael Shields (c)
4	Ray Carey
5	Noel O'Leary
17	John Miskella
7	Paudie Kissane		(substituted off) 41'
8	Alan O'Connor		(substituted off) 35'
9	Aidan Walsh
10	Ciarán Sheehan
11	Pearse O'Neill		(substituted off) 56'
12	Paddy Kelly
13	Daniel Goulding
14	Donncha O'Connor
15	Paul Kerrigan	(yellow card) 24'	(substituted off) 69'
Substitutes:
25	Nicholas Murphy		(substituted in) 35' (substituted off) 65'
6	Graham Canty		(substituted in) 41'
29	Colm O'Neill		(substituted in) 56'
24	Derek Kavanagh		(substituted in) 65'
30	John Hayes		(substituted in) 69'
Manager:
Conor Counihan

DOWN:
1	Brendan McVeigh
2	Daniel McCartan
3	Dan Gordon	(yellow card) 44'
4	Damien Rafferty		(substituted off) 58'
5	Declan Rooney
6	Kevin McKernan
7	Conor Garvey
8	Peter Fitzpatrick	(yellow card) 43'
9	Kalum King		(substituted off) 65'
10	Daniel Hughes
11	Mark Poland		(substituted off) 66'
12	Benny Coulter (c)	(yellow card) 64'
13	Paul McComiskey		(substituted off) 56'
14	John Clarke		(substituted off) 45'
15	Martin Clarke
Substitutes:
25	Conor Maginn		(substituted in) 45'
20	Brendan MacArdle		(substituted in) 58'
29	Aidan Branagan		(substituted in) 65'
30	Conor Laverty		(substituted in) 66'
27	Ronan Murtagh		(substituted in) 56'
Manager:
James McCartan Jnr

Man of the Match:
Daniel Goulding

Linesmen:
Gearoid O Comhana (Galway)
Maurice Deegan (Laois)

Sideline Official
Syl Doyle (Wexford)

Umpires
Tony Kearney
John Coldrick
James Matthews
Stephen O'Hare

== Post-match ==
=== Reaction ===
Lord Mayor of Cork Mick O'Connell described it as "an incredible match ... so tense ... Everyone was delirious when they won".

Cork manager Conor Counihan expressed his feelings in the press room: "Relief, at the end of the day. It's fantastic for the lads, each and every one of them. I spoke to them and we have 30 good guys here, but there are a lot of guys down the years who for one reason or another we had to move on from and those guys are part of this. And the last 20 years, we were landed with a fantastic group of players. They made it hard for themselves, but that makes it all the sweeter". Cork captain Graham Canty also expressed his feelings at a press conference: "Ah. It feels all right now. It is humbling being captain of this bunch of players. I don't understand why I am in here, just because I am captain". Canty offered his sympathies to Down captain Benny Coulter for the loss he had suffered.

Down manager James McCartan Jnr paid tribute to Cork "Because I do feel Cork were deserving winners on the day. We've no qualms about that at all". He also expressed pride in his own players. Down forward Danny Hughes said: "Well, none of us want to be one-hit wonders. There are a lot of young lads that came in this year, and there is a great development squad coming through. But we know these days don't happen every year, making All-Ireland finals. Hopefully this will make them hungrier, going forward into next year".

=== Homecoming ===
Tens of thousands of people were expected to line Cork city centre for a street party to coincide with the arrival of the winning team on 20 September 2010. The event was scheduled to be broadcast live to a global audience on the website of the Cork-based Irish Examiner national newspaper at 18:45.

=== Awards ===
The nominations for the 2010 GAA All Stars Awards were announced on the night of 22 September 2010. Eleven Cork players and seven Down players featured.
