= Damien Rafferty =

Irish Gaelic footballer

Damien Rafferty is an Irish Gaelic footballer. He played in the 2010 All-Ireland Final as a left-full-back and was Club Down Player of the Year after that. A Newry Shamrocks clubman, he was a corner-back and he had to retire in 2012 due to injury. Damien Rafferty played in the club's 2010 run. He was a "relevant newcomer". Though he was experienced he was not able to play in the early part of 2011. As of 2021, he was the most recent player from Newry to play inter-county championship football.
