= Daniel Hughes (Gaelic footballer) =

Irish Gaelic footballer

Personal information
- Native name: Dónall Ó hAodha (Irish)
- Nickname: Danny
- Born: County Down, Northern Ireland
- Height: 5 ft 11 in (180 cm)

Sport
- Sport: Gaelic football
- Position: Right Half Forward
Club
- Years: Club
- Saval
Club titles
- Down titles: 0
- Ulster titles: 0
- All-Ireland Titles: 0
Inter-county
Years	County	Apps (scores)
2001-2014	Down	35 (2-56)
Inter-county titles
- All Stars: 1

Daniel Hughes is a Gaelic football player from County Down, Northern Ireland. He plays for the Down senior inter county football team and for his club Saval.

He scored three points in the 2010 All-Ireland Football Final where Down were defeated 0-15 to 0-16 by Cork.

In October 2010, Hughes was named in the 2010 All-Star football team for his performances for Down during the 2010 season, it was his first All Star award. In November 2010, Hughes was also named in the 2010 GPA Gaelic Football team of the year. Daniel brother Johnny played for London in 2009 where Down played London. Hughes supports Liverpool F.C.

== Honours ==
- 1 Railway Cup 2009
- 1 Dr McKenna Cup 2008
- 1 Ulster Player of The January 2008
- 1 All Star 2010
- 1 Irish News Ulster All-Stars 2010
- 1 Top Scorer In The Down Senior Football Championship 2005
- 3 Down Senior Football League Division 2 2003 2007 2010
