= Declan Rooney =

Irish Gaelic footballer

Declan Rooney (born 1983/1984) is an Irish Gaelic footballer who played in the 2010 All-Ireland Final. He is a defender.

A Burren stalwart, he won a Down Senior Football Championship medal in 2010 when his club won that competition for the first since 1997. He won another in 2018, after turning 34 (he missed the 2011 county championship because of going over on his ankle). His carpentry work brought him to Dublin, and in 2013 he joined the St Sylvester's club; while there he was nursing a shoulder injury but held Dublin senior player Diarmuid Connolly scoreless when he made a substitute appearance at half-time against St Vincents in a Dublin Senior Football Championship quarter-final, Vincents winning the game by a point and later lifting the 2013–14 All-Ireland (Andy Merrigan Cup) title.
