= Ambrose Rogers =

Gaelic footballer

Ambrose Rogers is a Gaelic footballer for Down. He was captain in 2010 when Down played in the 2010 All-Ireland Senior Football Championship Final. Ambrose did not play in this match because he had a cruciate ligament injury. This injury occurred in the quarter-final victory over Kerry. He became captain again in 2012. The door was kept open for him and he even tried a cryotherapy bath, going all the way to Tyrone for it, before they opened one in Newry for him. His efforts fell short.

An Ulster All-Star in 2010, he was paired with Dick Clerkin in midfield. He was part of the Match for Michaela.
