= Paul McComiskey =

Irish Gaelic footballer

Personal information
- Native name: Pól Mac Comascaigh (Irish)
- Nickname: McComiskey
- Born: County Down, Northern Ireland
- Height: 5 ft 9 in (175 cm)

Sport
- Sport: Gaelic football
- Position: Right corner forward
Club
- Years: Club
- 2004–present: Dundrum
Club titles
- Down titles: 0
- Ulster titles: 0
College
- Years: College
- Queens
College titles
- Sigerson titles: 1
Inter-county
Years	County	Apps (scores)
2005-2006 2007-2009 2007-present	Down (M); Down (U-21); Down (S)	23 (1-31)
Inter-county titles
- Ulster titles: 2
- All-Irelands: 1
- All Stars: 1

Paul McComiskey is a Gaelic footballer from County Down, Northern Ireland. He plays for the Down senior inter-county football team and with his local club Dundrum GAA.

He started at corner forward and scored three points in the 2010 All-Ireland Football Final where Down were defeated 0–15 to 0–16 by Cork. McComiskey turned down a contract with Brisbane Lions in Australian rules football. McComiskey is 1 of six Down players offered contracts in Aussie rules teams James Colgan, Martin Clarke Jamie O'Reilly Caolan Mooney and Connor Gough.

== Minor & Under 21 ==
McComiskey first was a member of the Down Minor team in 2005. Down made it the Ulster Minor Football Championship final in 2005 and they played a good Armagh team it was a close game but at the end Armagh won 0–11 to 0–10. Down were not out and made it to the All-Ireland Minor Football Championship Final Down player Mayo it was close early on but in the end Down won easily 1–15 to 0–08 McComiskey scoring 1–3 giving McComiskey a first All-Ireland medal. Down were beat in 2006 by Cavan in the first round of Ulster. He joined the Under-21 team in 2007. Down were beat by Fermanagh. In 2008, Down won the Ulster Under-21 Football Championship, beating Derry in the final 3–11 to 1–14. McComiskey scoring 1–4 and getting the man of the match and a first Ulster medal Down lost the All-Ireland semi-final to Kildare. Down won back to back Ulster Under-21 Championship this time beating Armagh it was a close game but Peter Fitzpatrick and Michael Magee on top in midfield Down won thanks to a late goal scored by Mark Poland's younger brother Conor Paul scoring 4 points giving him a second Ulster medal. Down player Mayo 3 days after in the semi-final winning 1–15 to 2–09. Saw play Cork in the All-Ireland Final but lost a Cork goal in the last minutes of the game. Paul was named in the best Under-21 from 2005 to 2010.

== Senior ==
McComiskey joined the Down senior team in 2007 under Ross Carr he came on in the first round of the Ulster Senior Football Championship versus Cavan that was a draw 3–8 to 2–11 scoring a point Down won the replay 0–15 to 0–11 McComiskey came on and scored 2 points Down were beat by Monaghan 2–15 to 1–15 McComiskey came on and scored a point Down were beat by Meath in the back door 1–10 to 0–08. In 2008 he played in 5 League games starting in 1 scoring a point he scored 4 points in the league Down Played Tyrone first round of the championship was a draw 2.8 to 2.8 McComiskey scoring the last score point Down won the replay 1.19 to 0–21 Down lost to Armagh in the semi-final 1.12 to 11 points. In 2009 McComiskey made his first championship start verus Fermanagh Down were beaten 0–13 to 0–10 Paul scoring 2 points Down played London in Newry Down won 1–16 to 1–07 McComiskey hit 3 points Down then played Laois Down won 2–9 to 0–7 points McComiskey scored 1 of the goals Down then played Wicklow Down lost 1–15 to 0–17 points McComiskey scoring 4. In 2010 it was different for Down beat Donegal 1–15 to 2–10 then played Tyrone Down lost 0–14 to 0–10 points. Down had a good back door with 3 wins from 3 over Longford, Offaly and Sligo. Then Down played Kerry in the All-Ireland quarter-final. Down surprised Kerry 1–16 to 1–10, McComiskey chipping 2 points. Then Down played Kildare in the semi-final, with Down coming out on the right side with a two-point win 1–16 to 1–14, McComiskey scoring a point. Down played Cork in the 2010 All-Ireland Senior Football Championship Final. Cork won 0–16 to 0-15 points McComiskey scoring 3 points. McComiskey has scored 1 goal and 31 points for Down. A back injury ruled McComiskey out of Down's championship campaign.

He has won some silverware with club winning the Down Junior Football Championship in 2005 as well as doing the double that year by winning Division 4 and in 2007 he won the Division 3 League. In 2011, he made it to the Down Intermediate semi-final where they played Ballymartin it was a close game early on Ballymartin won 0–15 to 0–10 McComiskey scoring 0-07. McComiskey won his second Division 4 title in 2012 he was the captain of the team and also won the Junior Championship.

== Honours ==
County

- Ulster Under-21 Football Championship (2): 2008 2009
- All-Ireland Minor Football Championship (1): 2005
- All-Ireland Senior Football Championship (1): Runner-Up 2010
- Peadar Martin Memorial Cup (1): 2003

Collages

- Sigerson Cup (1): 2007
- Ryan Cup (1): 2007
- Ulster Fresher's Sevens (1): 2007

Club

- Down Junior Football Championship (2): 2005 2012 (c)
- Down Division 4 League (3): 2005 2012 (c) 2016
- Down Division 3 League (1): 2007
- Ulster Fresher's Sevens (1): 2007

Ulster

- Railway Cup (1): 2013

Awards

- Ulster College All Star (1) 2006
- Ulster Under 21 Man of the Match 2008
