= Daniel McCartan =

Irish Gaelic footballer

Daniel 'Dan' McCartan
Personal information
- Native name: Dónal Mac Artáin (Irish)
- Nickname: Dan
- Born: County Down, Northern Ireland
- Height: 5 ft 8 in (173 cm)

Sport
- Sport: Gaelic football
- Position: Right corner back
Club
- Years: Club
- Burren
Club titles
- Down titles: 3
- Ulster titles: 0
College titles
- Sigerson titles: 1
Inter-county
Years	County	Apps (scores)
2003–present	Down	16 (0–01)
Inter-county titles
- All Stars: 2

Daniel McCartan is a Gaelic footballer who plays for his local club Burren GAA and at senior level for the Down county team. He is the younger brother of former Down manager James McCartan Jr.

He started at right corner back in the 2010 All-Ireland Football Final where Down were defeated 0–15 to 0-16 by Cork. Dan has won 3 down championships in 2010, 2011 & 2018.

== Honours ==
- 2 Down Senior Football Oak grange sevens tournament Championship 2010 2011
- 2 Ryan Cup 2006 2007
- 2 Sigerson Cup All-Star 2004 2007
- 1 Sigerson Cup 2007 Caption
- 1 Freshers All Ireland 2000
- 2 Down Senior Football League Division 1 2006, 2012
- 1 Ulster Freshers Seven's 2007 C
