= 2010 Ulster Senior Football Championship =

Championship venues

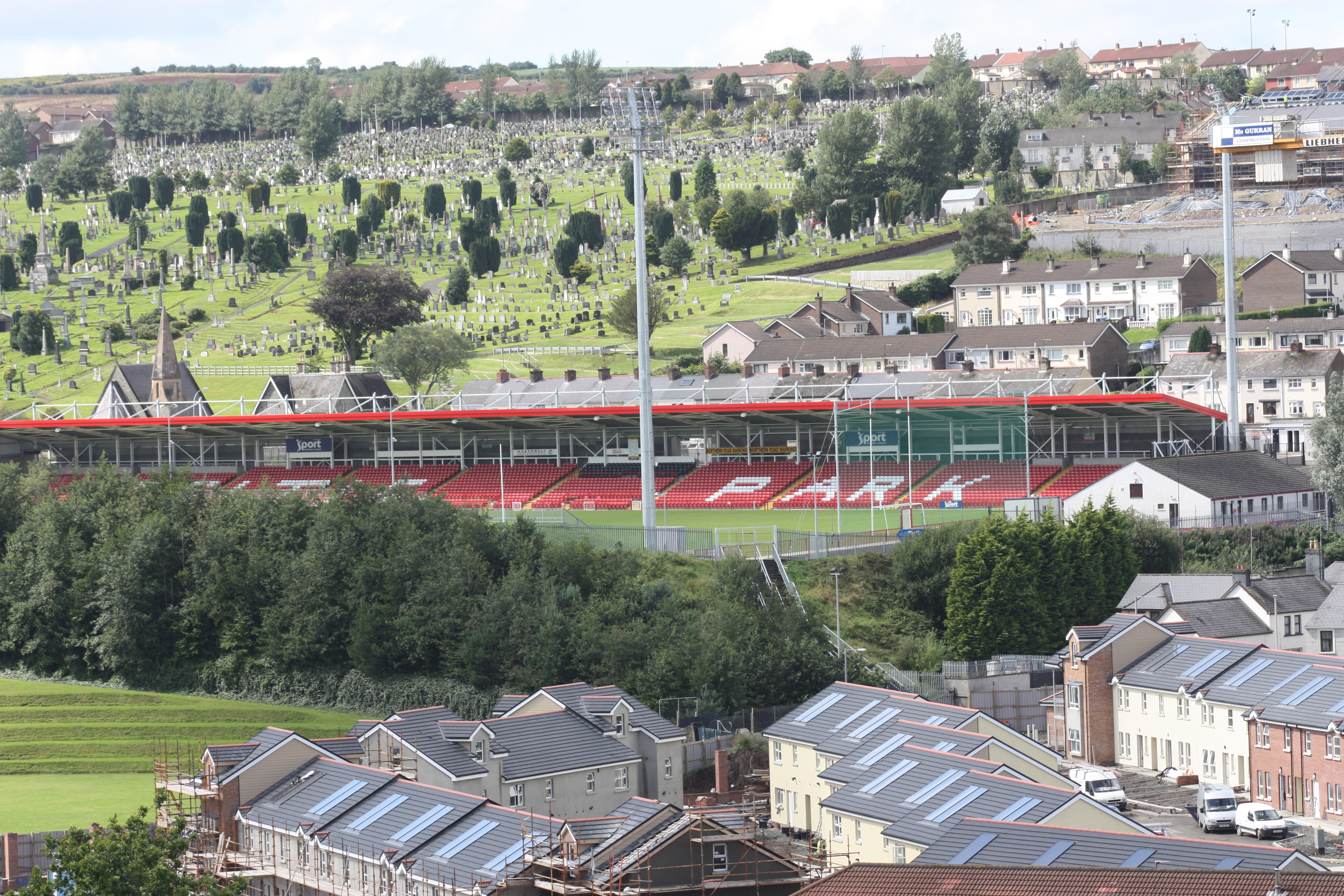
Celtic Park in the City of Derry

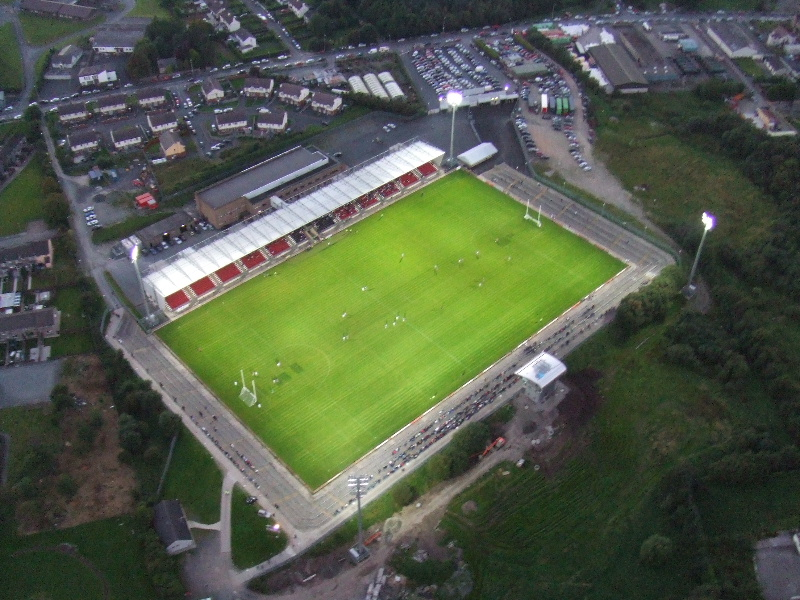
Healy Park in Omagh

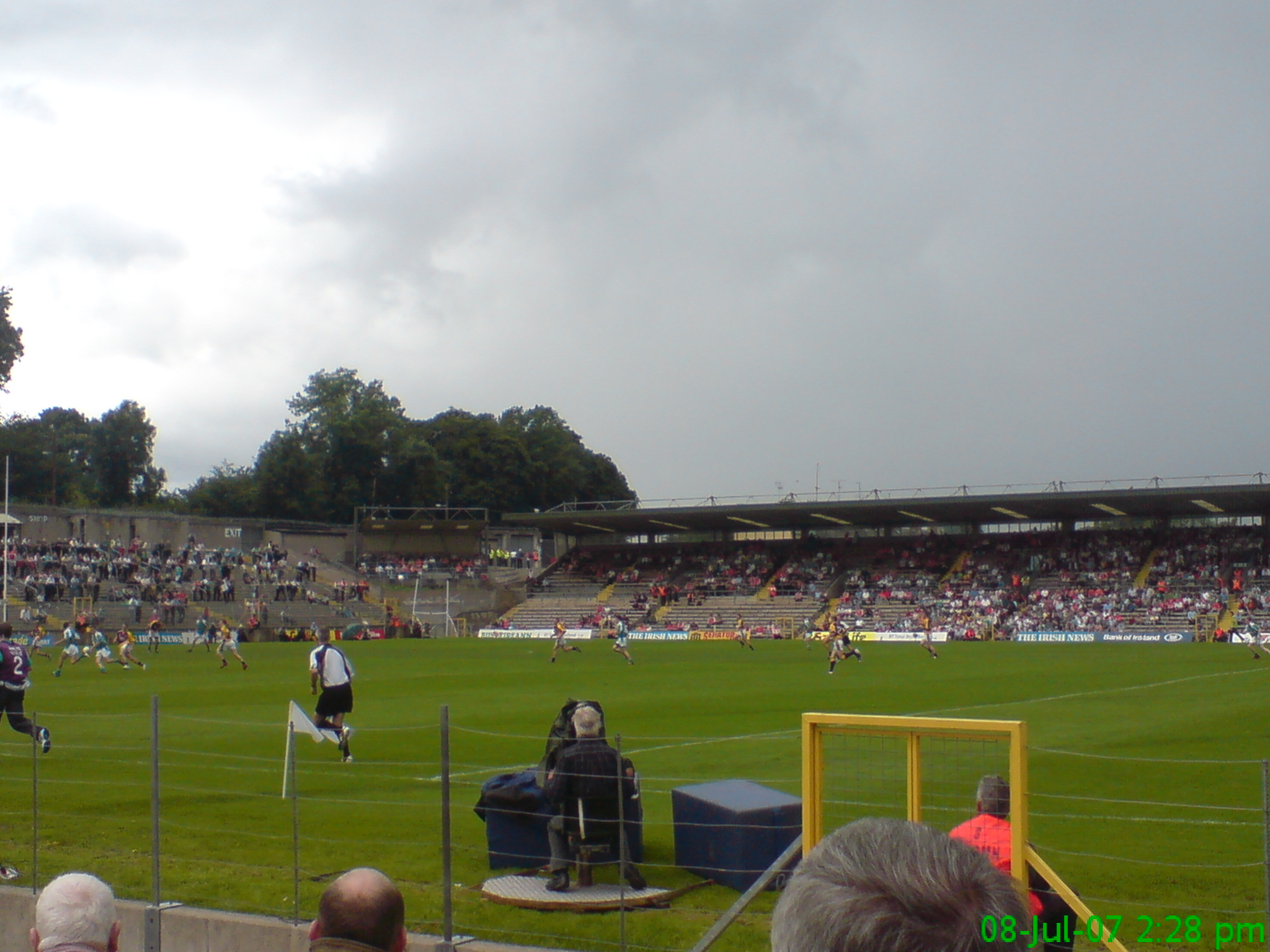
St Tiernach's Park in Clones

and others elsewhere...

The 2010 Ulster Senior Football Championship was the 122nd installment of the annual Ulster Senior Football Championship held under the auspices of the Ulster GAA. It was won by Tyrone who defeated Monaghan in the final to retain the title they won the previous year. The winning team received the Anglo-Celt Cup, and automatically advanced to the quarter-final stage of the 2010 All-Ireland Senior Football Championship.

2010 was the final year of Armagh and Tyrone's eleven-year sharing of Ulster senior titles. The following year brought the rise of an exciting young Donegal team which consigned the decade-long dominance of those two counties to history.

== Bracket ==
Preliminary Round
Derry	1-7
Armagh	1-10

Quarter-finals
Antrim	1-13
Tyrone	2-14
Donegal	2-10
Down	1-15
Cavan	0-13
Fermanagh	1-13
Monaghan	1-18
Armagh	0-9

Semi-finals
Tyrone	0-14
Down	0-10
Fermanagh	2-8
Monaghan	0-21

Ulster final
Tyrone	1-14
Monaghan	0-7

== Preliminary round ==
16 May 2010
Preliminary Round

Derry	1-7 – 1-10	Armagh
Paddy Bradley 1-2, M Lynch 0-4, E Bradley 0-1. E Bradley SO	Report	S McDonnell 0-5, A Kernan 0-3, J Clarke 1-0, C Vernon, R Henderson 0-1 each.

Celtic Park, Derry
Attendance: 10,242
Referee: Maurice Deegan (Laois)

== Quarter-finals ==
23 May 2010
Quarter Final

Antrim	1-13 – 2-14	Tyrone
P Cunningham 0-5, CJ McGourty 0-4, K Niblock 1-1, T McCann, M McCann, T Scullion 0-1 each.	Report	K Hughes 1-1, S O'Neill, S Cavanagh 0-3 each, O Mulligan 1-0, M Penrose 0-2, C Cavanagh, Justin McMahon, B Dooher, P Jordan, T McGuigan 0-1 each.

Casement Park, Belfast
Attendance: 18,159
Referee: Pat McEnaney (Monaghan)
30 May 2010
Quarter Final

Donegal	2-10 – 1-15 AET	Down
D Molloy 1-3, C Dunne 1-0, R Kavanagh, D Walsh, M Murphy, A Hanlon, M McHugh, C McFadden, E Wade 0-1 each.	Report	B Coulter 1-4, D Hughes 0-4, M Poland, M Clarke 0-3 each, J Clarke 0-1.

MacCumhaill Park, Ballybofey
Attendance: 12,000
Referee: Joe McQuillan (Cavan)
6 June 2010
Quarter Final

Monaghan	1-18 - 0-9	Armagh
P Finlay 0-7, T Freeman 1-4, D Clerkin 0-2, C McManus, C Hanratty, V Corey, H McElroy, D Freeman 0-1 each	Report	S McDonnell 0-4, J Clarke 0-2, A Kernan, P Duffy, G Swift 0-1 each. B Mallon SO

Casement Park, Belfast
Attendance: 11,675
Referee: M. Sludden (Tyrone)
12 June 2010
Quarter Final

Cavan	0-13 - 1-13	Fermanagh
G Smith 0-4, S Johnston 0-3, D Givney, M Brennan 0-2 each, P Brady, C Mackey 0-1 each.	Report	R Carson 1-3, P Ward 0-3, Rory Gallagher, C O'Brien, S Quigley 0-2 each, D Keenan 0-1.

Breffni Park, Cavan
Attendance: 9,677
Referee: P. Fox (Westmeath)

== Semi-finals ==
19 June 2010
Semi Final

Tyrone	0-14 - 0-10	Down
M Penrose 0-5, S Cavanagh 0-3, B Dooher 0-2, Joe McMahon, D Carlin, C Cavanagh, O Mulligan 0-1 each.	Report	M Clarke 0-3, M Poland, A Rogers 0-2 each, D Gordon, D Hughes, P McComiskey 0-1 each.

Casement Park, Belfast
Attendance: 15,419
Referee: G. Kinneavy (Galway)
27 June 2010
Semi Final

Fermanagh	2-8 - 0-21	Monaghan
R Gallagher 1-2, D Keenan 1-1, D Ward, R Carson, P Ward, R Keenan, S Quigley 0-1 each	Report	P Finlay 0-6, C McManus, T Freeman 0-3 each, D Clerkin, D Freeman, H McElroy 0-2 each, O Lennon, S Gollogly, M McElroy 0-1 each

Breffni Park, Cavan
Attendance: 17,000
Referee: M. Duffy (Sligo)

== Final ==
18 July 2010
Final

Tyrone	1-14 - 0-7	Monaghan
C Cavanagh 1-0, S Cavanagh 0-3, K Hughes, D Harte, M Penrose 0-2 each, T McGuigan, C Gormley, B Dooher, P Jordan, Joe McMahon 0-1 each	Report	C McManus 0-2, T Freeman, P Finlay, R Woods, D Clerkin, D Mone 0-1 each

St Tiernach's Park, Clones
Attendance: 34,000
Referee: David Coldrick (Meath)
