= Brendan McVeigh =

Irish Gaelic footballer

Personal information
- Born: 1981 (age 44–45) Kilkeel, County Down, Northern Ireland
- Height: 6 ft 1 in (185 cm)

Sport
- Sport: Gaelic Football
- Position: Goalkeeper
Club
- Years: Club
- 2000-: An Ríocht
Inter-county
- Years: County
- 2003-: Down
Inter-county titles
- All Stars: 1

Brendan McVeigh is a Gaelic football player from County Down, Northern Ireland. He plays for the Down senior inter county football team and for his club An Ríocht as a goalkeeper. McVeigh made his first start in 2005 against Tyrone he also played Midfield in the 2005 Championship, scoring a point.

He played in the 2010 All-Ireland Football Final in which Down were defeated 0-15 to 0-16 by Cork.

In October 2010, McVeigh was named as the goalkeeper in the 2010 All Star football team for his performances for Down during the 2010 season; it was his first All Star Award. In November 2010, McVeigh was also named in the 2010 GPA Gaelic Football Team of the Year.

== Honours ==
Winner

- 1 All Stars Award (2010)
- 1 Irish News Ulster All Star (2010)
- 1 Dr. McKenna Cup (2008)
- 1 Railway Cup (2012)
- 1 Down ACFL League Division 1 (2007)
- 2 Down ACFL Division 2s (2006, 2009)

Runner-up

- 1 All-Ireland Senior Football Championship (2010)
- 2 Ulster Senior Football Championships (2003, 2010)
- 2 National Football League Division 2s (2004, 2010)
- 1 National Football League Division 3 (2009)
