= James McCartan Jnr =

Irish Gaelic footballer and manager

James McCartan
Personal information
- Native name: Séamas Óg Mac Artáin (Irish)
- Nickname: Wee James
- Born: County Down, Northern Ireland
- Height: 5 ft 8 in (173 cm)

Sport
- Sport: Gaelic football
- Position: Corner forward
Clubs
- Years: Club
- Tullylish; Tír Chonaill Gaels; Burren
Club titles
- Down titles: 1
- Ulster titles: 0
College titles
- Sigerson titles: 2
Inter-county
- Years: County
- 1990–2003: Down
Inter-county titles
- Ulster titles: 2
- All-Irelands: 2
- NFL: 1 (Div 3)
- All Stars: 2

James McCartan is an Irish Gaelic football manager and former player who played at senior level for the Down county team between 1990 and 2000. McCartan was part of the Down team that won the All-Ireland Senior Football Championship in 1991 and 1994. McCartan also won two Ulster Senior Football Championships with the county. At underage level McCartan won Ulster Minor and All-Ireland Minor Football Championship medals. He also won two All Star awards during his career.

McCartan usually played as a corner forward. He was renowned for his speed, swerving runs at the defence and scoring ability.

McCartan is regarded as one of the Down's best ever footballers. In 2009 to mark the 125th anniversary of the Gaelic Athletic Association he was named by The Irish News as one of the all-time best 125 footballers from Ulster.

In 2009, he took charge of the Down senior team, leading them to the 2010 All-Ireland Senior Football Championship Final in his first season in charge. He stepped down in 2014.

== Early life and family ==
McCartan is from Tullylish, County Down. His father, also called James, is regarded as one of the game's all-time greats and won three All-Ireland medals with Down in the 1960s. James's brothers Daniel and Eoin are former members of the Down team, while Charlie Pat also played for Down and Brian was midfield on the 1987 Down minor team that won the All-Ireland Minor Championship..

== Playing career ==
=== Inter-county ===
In 1986 at just 15 years old McCartan helped the Down Minor team win the Ulster Minor title.

In 1987 McCartan helped the Down Minor team win both the Ulster Minor and All-Ireland Minor Football Championships.

McCartan made his Down Senior debut in 1990. For his performances in the 1990 Championship he received an All Star award. He was the star player during the NFL in which Down was defeated by Meath in the final.

In 1991 he won his first Ulster Championship medal, with Down beating Donegal in the decider. Down defeated Kerry in the All-Ireland semi-final, before beating Meath in the All-Ireland final. McCartan was named man of the match for his display in the final. The success was Down's first All-Ireland Senior Football Championship title since 1968.

McCartan won a second Ulster Championship medal with Down in 1994 - overcoming Tyrone comfortably in the decider. Victories over Cork in the All-Ireland semi-final and Dublin in the final gave McCartan another All-Ireland Senior medal. For his performances that year he received another All Star.

McCartan reached further Ulster finals with Down in 1996, 1999 and 2003, but the county were beaten on each occasion. He retired from inter-county football in 2003.

=== Province ===
McCartan also represented Ulster on many occasions, and won the Railway Cup four times with the province.

=== International rules ===
McCartan played two games for the Ireland international rules football team in the victorious 1990 International Rules series. In 2001, he helped the Ireland national Australian rules football team claim the Atlantic Alliance Cup.

=== School/college ===
McCartan won Sigerson Cup medals with Queen's University Belfast in 1990 and 1993.

== Managerial career ==
=== Queen's University ===
Since retiring McCartan has managed a number of teams. The first team he took charge of was Queen's University who he led to a Sigerson Cup title in 2007.

=== Down ===
On 11 September 2009, he was named manager of the Down senior football team. He led his team to the 2010 All-Ireland Senior Football Championship Final in his first season in charge but they lost to Cork. Down had a poor 2011 season only winning 3 Championship games. In 2012 James led Down to their first League Semi-final in 22 years where they played Cork. It was a close game but Cork won 2–17 to 1-12. McCartan led Down to their first Ulster final since 2003 coming back from 0–11 to 0–02 to win by 1–14 to 1-13. In July 2014 McCartan stepped down as boss after 5 years in charge.

== Playing honours ==
=== Inter-county ===
- All-Ireland Senior Football Championship (2) 1991 1994
- Ulster Senior Football Championship (2) 1991 1994
- National Football League Division 3 (1) 1997
- All-Ireland Minor Football Championship (1) 1987
- Ulster Minor Football Championship (2) 1986 1987

=== Province ===
- 4 Railway Cups 1991 1993 1994 1995

=== School/college ===
- 2 Sigerson Cups 1990 1993
- 2 MacRory Cups 1986 1988
- 2 Hogan Cups 1986 1988

=== Club ===
- 1 London Senior Football Championship 1990

=== Individual ===
- 2 All Stars 1990 1994
- 1 All-Ireland Senior Football Championship Final Man of the Match 1991

=== Manager ===
- 1 Inter-County All-Ireland Senior Football Championship Runner-Up 2010
- 1 Inter-County Ulster Senior Football Championship Runner-Up 2012
- 2 Ryan Cups 2006 2007
- 1 Sigerson Cup 2007
- 1 Down Senior Football League 2006

Sporting positions
Preceded by	Down Senior Football Captain; 1999	Succeeded by
Preceded by Ross Carr	Down Senior Football Manager; 2009–2014	Succeeded by Jim McCorry
Preceded by Paddy Tally	Down Senior Football Manager; 2021–2022	Succeeded by Conor Laverty
