= Dan Gordon (Gaelic footballer) =

Irish Gaelic footballer

Personal information
- Nickname: Big Dan
- Born: County Down, Northern Ireland
- Occupation: P.E Teacher
- Height: 6 ft 3 in (191 cm)

Sport
- Sport: Gaelic football
- Position: Midfield
Club
- Years: Club
- Loughinisland
Club titles
- Down titles: 2
- Ulster titles: 0
Inter-county
Years	County	Apps (scores)
2002 – present	Down	41 (2-20)
Inter-county titles
- Ulster titles: 0
- All Stars: 0

Dan Gordon is a Gaelic footballer from County Down. He plays for the Down senior inter-county football team and with his local club Loughinisland. He briefly retired from the Down team in 2010 but returned at the start of the 2010 season. Gordon made his first championship start in 2002 where Down played Donegal.

He started at full back in the 2010 All-Ireland Football Final where Down were defeated 0–15 to 0–16 by Cork.

== Honours ==
Winner

- Railway Cup (4) 2004 2007 2009 2012
- Dr. McKenna Cup (1) 2008 (c)
- Irish News All Star (1) 2012

Runner Up

- Down Senior Football Championship (2) 2008 2009
- National Football League Division 2 (2) 2004 2010
- Ulster Senior Football Championship (2) 2003 2012
- All-Ireland Senior Football Championship (1) 2010
- National Football League Division 3 (1) 2009 (c)
- Railway Cup (1) 2005
