= Martin Clarke (footballer) =

Personal information
- Born: 13 November 1987 (age 38); Newry, Northern Ireland
- Original teams: An Ríocht GAA Club, Kilkeel, County Down
- Draft: 40th overall, 2006 Rookie Draft
- Height: 181 cm (5 ft 11 in)
- Weight: 84 kg (185 lb)
- Position: Half back

Playing career^{1}
| Years | Club | Games (Goals) |
| 2007–09; 2012–14 | Collingwood | 73 (19) |
- ^{1} Playing statistics correct to the end of 2014.

Career highlights
- AFL Rising Star nominee: 2007

Martin "Marty" Clarke (Irish: Máirtín Ó Cléirigh; born 13 November 1987) is a Gaelic and former Australian rules footballer from Cranfield Point who played for the Collingwood Football Club in the Australian Football League (AFL) from 2007 to 2009 and again from 2012 to 2014.

== Underage ==
Clarke was an outstanding underage Gaelic football talent. He starred for Down GAA Minors, helping them to the 2005 All-Ireland Minor Football Championship and also played a large part in bringing his school (St Louis, Kilkeel), to 2 MacRory Cup finals in 2005 and 2006, and also to a MacLarnon Cup and an All Ireland Colleges 'B' title in as many years. He was part of the Down under-21 team that won an Ulster Championship in 2005. Clarke scored 3 goals and 20 points in an under 14 club game and 18 points in a schools game. He played senior football at local club level with An Ríocht as a centre half forward.

== AFL career ==
He was first alerted to AFL scouts in the 2005 MacRory Cup final, at which the Australian U17 international rules football team was present. He was invited to an AFL training camp in July 2006. He impressed scouts even more and on 22 August 2006 signed a contract with Collingwood Football Club, becoming the first ever truly international rookie for the club. In October 2007, when Clarke returned home from Australia for a three-week holiday and during that time helped his local club An Ríocht GAC lift its first ever Down Division One league title, defeating Kilcoo in the final. Clarke scored 2–1 in the final, which was played under lights in Pairc Esler, Newry on 26 October 2007. In 2008 Clarke lined out for An Ríocht. Clarke was dubbed by Collingwood assistant coach Guy McKenna as "the Irish equivalent of Nathan Buckley".

Clarke was developed through Collingwood's VFL affiliate the Williamstown Football Club, where he played a number of games semi-professionally as a rookie before debuting at AFL level. It was there that he made a name for himself as a quick midfielder with an ability to accumulate a high number of possessions. He was not only able to adapt extremely well to the oval ball, but brought across some Gaelic football skills which made publicity, particularly his ability to toe poke the oval ball off the ground into his hands.

On one such occasion, he was able to do so at full speed in wet conditions while being closely pursued by an opponent which was featured on Before the Game. On 16 February 2007 he made his AFL debut in a preseason game against Sydney Swans at the North Sydney Oval. He had an outstanding game which led Pies assistant coach Gavin Brown to say

"He was probably the stand-out player from the point of view that he had never played a game of Aussie Rules before ... It just showed that he has an enormous amount of will and want, and he had put in a lot of hard work. It was fantastic for him today – a good step.

Clarke made his debut in a premiership season game on 23 June 2007, also against the Swans. Again, his game was outstanding, with 20 possessions in front of a crowd of 64,222 at Sydney's Stadium Australia. His second game came in Round 13 against Hawthorn on 1 July 2007. In another promising display, Clarke picked up nineteen possessions and three goals, playing on former brownlow medallist Shane Crawford in a sell out crowd in front of 50,248 at Melbourne's Docklands Stadium. His three-goal onground performance earned him a nomination in the AFL Rising Star award in just his second game. Clarke started 2008 in a run of poor form which saw him dropped from the Collingwood side to play the Brisbane Lions. He didn't return for several weeks later and combined with a run of injuries did not recapture his 2007 form. Clarke was ruled out of representing Ireland in the 2008 International Rules Series due to an ankle injury.

== Return to Ireland ==
Martin Clarke
Personal information
- Nickname: Marty
- Born: 13 November 1987 (age 38) County Down, Northern Ireland
- Height: 6 ft 0 in (183 cm)

Sport
- Sport: Gaelic football
- Position: Centre forward
Club
- Years: Club
- 2004-: An Ríocht
Inter-county titles
- All Stars: 1

Clarke announced his retirement from AFL on 24 September 2009, citing his desire to return home and to play Gaelic football, which he said had prompted him to decline the offer of another three-year contract in Australia and that "I could easily have stayed. But I think this is what I want to do more. I am more passionate about playing for Down than playing for Collingwood."

In the 2010 season, Clarke succeeded in establishing himself in the Down senior team. Down made it to the National League Div 2 final but were beaten by Armagh in Croke Park. His poor form in the early stages improved as Down reached the Ulster championship semi-final and recovered from defeat in this game to successfully make their way through the qualifiers. In the All-Ireland Senior Football Championship quarter-finals they recorded a surprise win over Kerry before narrowly overcoming Kildare in the semi-finals setting up and All Ireland final meeting with Cork Downs first since 1994. In the end however Down ended up on the losing end of a 0–16 to 0–15 scoreline, Clarke ended the game scoring 0–03.

== Honours ==
County

- Ulster Under-21 Football Championship (1): 2005
- All-Ireland Minor Football Championship (1): 2005
- 2010 All-Ireland Senior Football Championship Runner-Up

Awards

- All Star (1): 2010
- Irish News All Star (1): 2010
- Irish News All Star Football of The Year (1): 2010
- Vodafone Player of The Month August (1): 2010
- Ulster Colleges All Stars (2): 2005, 2006

Club

- Down Football League Division 2 (1): 2009
- Down Football League Division 1 (1): 2007
- Down Minor B Football Championship (1): (2004)

School

- All-Ireland B Colleges Football Championship (1): 2004
- MacLarnon Cup (1): 2004

== Return to AFL ==
On 10 October 2011, Clarke was traded from Greater Western Sydney to Collingwood in the 2011 AFL Draft, marking his return to the AFL. Clarke opted not to play in the International Rules Series between Ireland and Australia, instead completing the start of preseason training with his new team.

At the end of the 2014 season, Clarke was delisted by Collingwood and might return to play Gaelic Football with County Down.

== Media work ==
Clarke has appeared on the BBC's championship coverage.

== See also ==
- List of players who have converted from one football code to another
- Irish experiment
- An Riocht
