= Brendan Coulter =

Irish Gaelic footballer

Brendan "Benny" Coulter is an Irish Gaelic football manager and player who plays for his local club Mayobridge and, previously, for the Down senior football team until his retirement in 2014; he also teaches kids about Gaelic in different schools around Northern Ireland.

== Playing career ==
During his prime, Coulter was regarded as one of the best attackers in Gaelic football. He is Ulster's leading Championship goal scorer of all-time.

He won an Ulster Minor Championship Medal in 1999, and later that year won the All-Ireland Minor Football Championship with Down he scored 1-02 in the All Ireland Final. Down manager Pete McGrath selected Coulter to make his debut for the senior team that year, despite his youth. He has since become one of Down's key players. He has captained Down, and has been described as the team's 'talisman'.

Coulter was selected to represent Ireland in the International Rules Series five times, in 2003, 2004, 2005, 2006, 2008 and 2010. He has also won 4 Railway Cups he has also won U-12, U-14, U-16, Minor and Reserve League and Championship, and also won an All-Ireland Under-16 Football Championship with St Marks Warrenpoint.

Benny has won 8 county championship with his club Mayobridge and is regarded as one of the most iconic players from the Mourne county.

Coulter has admitted to being targeted by sledging while on the field of play. Coulter supports Liverpool F.C. Benny was player/manager of Mayobridge GAA in the 2017 and 2018 campaign alongside Francie Poland. He now managed Longstone GAA. One of his controversial goals was against Kildare as Kildare players thought it was a square ball denying them a place in the All - Ireland Final

== Managerial career ==
Coulter was appointed Down minor football team manager ahead of the 2023 season.

== Honours ==
Club

- 8 Down Senior Football Championships (1999, 2001, 2002, 2004, 2005, 2006, 2007, 2008)
- 6 Down Senior Football League Division 1s (1999, 2001, 2002, 2004, 2009, 2010)

Inter-county

- 2 Down Minor Football Championships (1997, 1999)
- 1 Ulster Minor Football Championship (1999)
- 1 All-Ireland Minor Football Championship (1999)
- 1 All Ireland Under 16 Vocational School's (1997)
- 1 Ulster Under 16 Vocational School's (1997)
- 1 Down Vocational School's (1996)

Provincial

- 4 Railway Cups (2003, 2007, 2009, 2012)

International

- 3 International Rules (2004, 2008, 2009)

Individual

- 2 Down County Final Man of the Matches (2002, 2004)
- 1 Ulster final Man of the Match award (2002)
- 8 Down club Player of the Year awards (1999, 2000, 2002, 2003, 2004, 2005, 2006, 2007, 2008)
- 2 Irish News Ulster All Stars (2003, 2010)
- 1 All Star (2010)

Sporting positions
Preceded by Seán Ward	Down Senior Football Captain; 2004	Succeeded by Liam Doyle
Preceded by Liam Doyle	Down Senior Football Captain; 2006	Succeeded by Declan Rooney
Preceded by Ambrose Rogers	Down Senior Football Captain; 2011	Succeeded by Ambrose Rogers
