= Seánie Burrows =

Irish Gaelic footballer

Personal information
- Native name: Seánie de Brú (Irish)
- Born: 1946 (age 79–80) Tralee, County Kerry, Ireland
- Height: 5 ft 11 in (180 cm)

Sport
- Sport: Gaelic football
- Position: Left corner-back
Club
- Years: Club
- John Mitchels
Club titles
- Kerry titles: 3
Inter-county
Years	County	Apps (scores)
1964–1968	Kerry	12 (0-00)
Inter-county titles
- Munster titles: 2
- All-Irelands: 0
- NFL: 0

Seánie Burrows (born in 1946) is an Irish former Gaelic footballer and basketball player. At club level he played with John Mitchels and also lined out at inter-county level with various Kerry teams during the 1960s.

Seanie coached both football and basketball up to national league and international levels.

He is father to Henry Burrows, a former Irish international basketball player. His daughter, Elaine Burrows Dillane is a sea swimmer.

== Schools ==
Burrows first played Gaelic football as a student at Tralee CBS.

== Club ==
He won a Kerry MFC medal with the John Mitchels club in 1961, before joining the senior team while still a minor. Burrows won three Kerry SFC medals between 1962 and 1966.

== Minor ==
Burrows had a long and successful spell with the Kerry minor team.

He first joined the team as a 16-year-old in 1962. Wins over Limerick, Waterford and Cork seen him pick up a Munster title. An All-Ireland semi-final win over Offaly seen Kerry into the All-Ireland final. In the final goals were the difference as Kerry overcame Mayo in the final.

He won a second Munster title in 1963 after a replay win over Cork. Kerry were back in the All-Ireland final this time against Westmeath. Another big win on a 1-10 to 0-02 scoreline seen Burrows win his second All-Ireland medal.

His brother, Henry "Bruddy" Burrows, was also a member of the team in 1962-63, making them the only two brothers to have won back to back winners' medals in the minor grade.

In his final year as a minor Kerry had a surprise loss to Clare in the Munster semi-final.

In his three seasons at minor level, Burrows played 12 times, all at Right Corner Back

== Under 21 ==
Burrows spent an unprecedented five years with the Kerry under-21 team.

He first played when he was still minor and just 17 years old in 1963.

In 1964 while still a minor he won his first Munster title after a win over Tipperary in the final. Despite being known as a back he was at left corner-forward when the team beat Laois in the 1964 All-Ireland under-21 final.

After an unsuccessful 1965 he won his second Munster title after a win over Cork. Kerry faced Kildare in the All-Ireland semi-final. However they fell to a heavy loss on a 2-14 to 0-09 scoreline in Cork Park.

In his fifth and final year at U21, he won his third Munster title after a win over Clare. For the second season in a row Kerry faced Kildare in the All-Ireland semi-final. This time it was Burrows and co who got the win on a 3-09 to 1-07 scoreline. In the All-Ireland final Kerry faced Mayo. The side ended level on a 2-10 each scoreline. In the replay Mayo proved to have too much and won out on a 4-09 to 1-07 scoreline.

== Junior ==
On the back of his underage displays, he joined the Kerry Junior team. Despite his success at minor and Under 21 he had little success at Junior level. Failing to win either a Munster Junior Football Championship or All-Ireland Junior Football Championship.

== Senior ==
After his success at underage level Burrows joined the senior team during the 1964–65 National League.

He later won a Munster SFC medal after a final win over Limerick.

The next few seasons proved to be unsuccessful as Kerry lost to Cork in Munster finals in 1966 and 1967

He won his second Munster title in 1968 after a win over Cork. An All-Ireland semi-final win over Longford. In the final, they faced Down, a side Kerry had lost out to in the early part of the decade. The title would go North once more as Burrows and co lost out on a 2-12 to 1-13 scoreline.

Despite being only 22 years old, it would be his last game with Kerry. Despite his underage success, he would only 10 Championship and 12 National League games.

== Basketball ==
Along with his brother, he enjoyed much success in Basketball.

He won many counties and All-Ireland titles in his playing days, many alongside his brother Bruddy.

In 2020, he was the first to be inducted into Kerry Basketball Hall of Fame.

== Honours ==
John Mitchels

- Kerry Senior Football Championship: 1962, 1963, 1966
- Kerry Minor Football Championship: 1961

Kerry

- Munster Senior Football Championship: 1965, 1968
- All-Ireland Under-21 Football Championship: 1964
- Munster Under-21 Football Championship: 1964, 1966, 1967
- All-Ireland Minor Football Championship: 1962, 1963
- Munster Minor Football Championship: 1962, 1963

Seanie (9 All-Ireland medals and 3 Runner-Up medals)

Football 1962 - Minor All-Ireland Winner 1963 - Minor All-Ireland Winner 1964 - U21 All-Ireland Winner 1967 - U21 All-Ireland Runner Up 1965 - Senior All-Ireland Runner-Up 1968 - Senior All-Ireland Runner-Up

Basketball 1962 - Minor All-Ireland Winner 1963 - Minor All-Ireland Winner 1964 - Minor All-Ireland Winner 1970 - Senior All-Ireland Winner Year not known - Senior FCA Basketball All-Ireland Championship Winner Year not known – Senior Grand Finale FCA v Army All-Ireland Championship Winner
