= Nicky Behan =

Irish Gaelic footballer and hurler

Personal information
- Native name: Nioclás Ó Beacháin (Irish)
- Born: 1946 Allenwood, County Kildare, Ireland
- Height: 5 ft 4 in (163 cm)

Sport
- Sport: Hurling
- Position: Full-back
Clubs
- Years: Club
- Allenwood; Éire Óg-Corrachoill
Club titles
	Football	Hurling
Kildare titles	0	6
Inter-county
- Years: County
- Kildare
Inter-county titles
- Leinster titles: 0
- All-Irelands: 0
- NFL: 0
- All Stars: 0

Nicholas Behan (born 1946) was an Irish Gaelic footballer and hurler. At club level, he played with Allenwood and he also lined out as a dual player with various Kildare teams.

== Career ==
McTeague had his first success at club level in 1964 when he won a Kildare MFC title with St Mary's. He later progressed to adult level Gaelic football with Allenwood. Behan played his club hurling with Éire Óg-Corrachoill and won six Kildare SHC medals between 1964 and 1971.

At inter-county level, Behan was part of the Kildare team that won consecutive Leinster U21FC titles as well as the All-Ireland U21FC title in 1965. Behan added an All-Ireland JHC medal to his collection after beating Warwickshire in the 1966 All-Ireland junior final. An All-Ireland IHC medal followed in 1969, having earlier claimed the Division 2 league title.

== Honours ==
St Mary's

- Kildare Minor Football Championship: 1964

Éire Óg-Corrachoill

- Kildare Senior Hurling Championship: 1964, 1965, 1966, 1967, 1970, 1971

Kildare

- All-Ireland Intermediate Hurling Championship: 1969
- Leinster Intermediate Hurling Championship: 1969
- All-Ireland Junior Hurling Championship: 1966
- Leinster Junior Hurling Championship: 1966
- National Hurling League Division 2: 1968–69
- All-Ireland Under-21 Football Championship: 1965
- Leinster Under-21 Football Championship: 1965, 1966
