= Ollie Crinnigan =

Kildare Gaelic footballer

Personal information
- Native name: Oilibhéar Ó Crionagáin (Irish)
- Born: 1947 (age 78–79) Carbury, County Kildare, Ireland
- Occupation: Maintenance fitter
- Height: 5 ft 10 in (178 cm)

Sport
- Sport: Gaelic football
- Position: Goalkeeper
Club
- Years: Club
- 1965–1988: Carbury
Club titles
- Kildare titles: 7
Inter-county
- Years: County
- 1965–1980: Kildare
Inter-county titles
- Leinster titles: 0
- NFL: 0
- All Stars: 1

Oliver T. Crinnigan (born 1947) is an Irish former Gaelic footballer who played for the Carbury club and at inter-county level with the Kildare senior football team.

== Playing career ==
Crinnigan first played Gaelic football at juvenile and underage levels with the Carbury club before eventually joining the club's senior team while still a minor. He won a total of seven Kildare SFC titles between 1965 and 1985. Crinnigan also won a New York SFC title with the Sligo team.

Crinnigan first appeared on the inter-county scene with Kildare during a two-year tenure with the minor team. As a member of the under-21 team for four years, he won three successive Leinster U21FC titles and was in goal when Kildare beat Cork in the 1965 All-Ireland under-21 final. Crinnigan was still eligible for the minor grade when he joined the senior team in 1965 and never missed a championship game until his retirement in 1980. During that time, he lined out in six Leinster finals without success, however, he became Kildare's first ever All-Star recipient in 1978. Crinnigan also won a Railway Cup medal with Leinster.

== Coaching career ==
Crinningan was in the twilight of his club career with Carbury when he became player-manager. He was denied an eighth Kildare SFC medal when Carbury were beaten by Johnstownbridge in 1988 final.

== Honours ==
Carbury

- Kildare Senior Football Championship: 1965, 1966, 1969, 1971 (c), 1972, 1974, 1985

Kildare

- All-Ireland Under-21 Football Championship: 1965
- Leinster Under-21 Football Championship: 1965, 1966, 1967

Leinster

- Railway Cup: 1974

Sporting positions
Preceded by	Kildare senior football team captain 1975	Succeeded by
