= Tommy Carew =

Irish Gaelic football player and hurler

Personal information
- Native name: Tomás Carrún (Irish)
- Born: 1946 Clane, County Kildare, Ireland

Sport
- Football Position: Full-forward
- Hurling Position: Full-forward
Clubs
- Years: Club
- Clane; Coill Dubh
Club titles
	Football	Hurling
Kildare titles	4	3
Inter-county
- Years: County
- 1965–1980: Kildare
Inter-county titles
	Football	Hurling
Leinster Titles	0	0
All-Ireland Titles	0	0
League titles	0	0
All-Stars	0	0

Thomas Carew (born 1946) is an Irish former hurler, Gaelic footballer and coach. At club level, he played with Clane and Coill Dubh and at inter-county level he lined out as a dual player with various Kildare teams.

== Playing career ==
Carew first played Gaelic football to a high standard as a student at Belcamp College. He was part of the college team that won the Leinster Colleges SFC title in 1965, before losing to St Columb's College in the Hogan Cup.

At club level, Carew played Gaelic football with Clane. He won four Kildare SFC titles, including one as team captain in 1984. As a hurler with Coill Dubh, Carew was part of the team that won the Kildare U15HC title in 1961, with the majority of that team going on to claim the Kildare JHC title in 1968. Almost 20 years later and in the twilight of his career, he won his first Kildare SHC title in 1987. Carew added two more SHC medals in 1990 and 1993, before ending his career with a Kildare IHC victory in 1995.

At inter-county level with Kildare, Carew won consecutive Leinster U21FC titles, as well as being part of their inaugural All-Ireland U21FC success in 1965. He won an All-Ireland JHC medal after beating Warwickshire in the 1966 All-Ireland junior final. An All-Ireland IHC medal followed for Carew in 1969, having earlier claimed the Division 2 league title.

Carew's career with the Kildare senior football team saw him lose six leinster SFC finals between 1966 and 1978. He was also part of the Kildare senior hurling team that won the inaugural All-Ireland SBHC title in 1974. Carew made his 83rd and final competitive appearance for the team when he won a second All-Ireland SBHC medal in 1980.

== Post-playing career ==
In retirement from playing, Carew became involved in team management and coaching. He was a selector and assistant manager under Mick O'Dwyer during his first tenure as Kildare senior team manager, while he also trained the Kildare under-21 team to the Leinster U21FC title in 1992. He was named on both of Kildare's Millennium Teams in 2000.

== Honours ==
=== Player ===
Belcamp College

- Leinster Colleges Senior Football Championship: 1965

Clane

- Kildare Senior Football Championship: 1967, 1975, 1980, 1984 (c)

Coill Dubh

- Kildare Senior Hurling Championship: 1987, 1990, 1993
- Kildare Intermediate Hurling Championship: 1995
- Kildare Junior Hurling Championship: 1968

Kildare

- All-Ireland Senior B Hurling Championship: 1974, 1980
- All-Ireland Intermediate Hurling Championship: 1969
- Leinster Intermediate Hurling Championship: 1969
- All-Ireland Junior Hurling Championship: 1966
- Leinster Junior Hurling Championship: 1966
- National Hurling League Division 2: 1968–69
- All-Ireland Under-21 Football Championship: 1965 (c)
- Leinster Under-21 Football Championship: 1965 (c), 1966 (c)

=== Management ===
Kildare

- Leinster Under-21 Football Championship: 1992
