= 1971–72 National Hurling League =

41st season of the National Hurling League

League details
- Dates: 10 October 1971 – 7 May 1972

League champions
- Winners: Cork (9th win)
- Captain: Frank Norberg

League runners-up
- Runners-up: Limerick
- Captain: Jim Hogan

The 1971–72 National Hurling League was the 41st season of the National Hurling League (NHL), an annual hurling competition for the GAA county teams.

== Overview ==
=== Structure ===
The National Hurling League's top division featured sixteen teams divided into two groups - 1A and 1B. Each group consisted of eight teams. The top two teams in Division 1A advance to the semi-finals. The third- and fourth-placed teams in 1A, as well as the top two from 1B, play in the quarter-finals.

=== Overview ===
In spite of a poor standing in the group stages, having won just three of their seven games, Cork won their third league title in four seasons.  Limerick, who were league runners-up, actually finished above Cork in the group stage, however, they fell to 'the Rebels' in the final.[3]

Down at the other end of the tables, Dublin won just one of their group stage games and were relegated to Division 1B. They swapped places with Galway who, having enjoyed an unbeaten run in the group stage, topped Division 1B and gained promotion to the top eight in Division 1A for the following season. Westmeath lost all seven of their group stage games and finished bottom of Division 1B, however, they were not relegated to Division 2 as there was no promotion or relegation between these two separate divisions.

== Tables ==
=== Division 1A ===
Pos	Team	Pld	W	D	L	Diff	Pts	Notes
1	Tipperary	7	5	1	1	+15	11	
2	Kilkenny	7	5	0	2	+33	10	
3	Limerick	7	5	0	2	+32	10	Division 1 runners-up
4	Cork	7	3	1	3	+13	7	Division 1 champions
5	Wexford	7	3	1	3	+3	7	
6	Clare	7	2	1	4	-14	5	
7	Offaly	7	2	0	3	-38	4	
8	Dublin	7	1	0	6	-44	2	Relegated to Division 1B

=== Division 1B ===
Pos	Team	Pld	W	D	L	Diff	Pts	Notes
1	Galway	7	6	1	0	+43	13	Promoted to Division 1A
2	Waterford	7	5	0	2	+44	10	
3	Laois	7	5	0	2	+29	10	
4	Antrim	7	3	0	4	+0	6	
5	Kildare	7	3	0	4	-9	6	
6	Kerry	7	3	0	4	-28	6	
7	Wicklow	7	2	1	4	+1	5	
8	Westmeath	7	0	0	7	-80	0	

== Results ==
=== Group stage ===
10 October 1971	Kilkenny	2-16 - 2-10	Tipperary	Nowlan Park, Kilkenny
3.30pm	M. Brennan (1-3), E. Keher (0-7), N. Byrne (1-0), P. Moran (0-2), M. Murphy (0-1), K. Purcell (0-1), P. Delaney (0-1), M. Coogan (0-1).		R. Ryan (2-0), J. Flanagan (0-4), M. Roche (0-3), J. Ryan (0-1), P. Byrne (0-1), D. Ryan (0-1).	Attendance: 9,000; Referee: F. Murphy (Cork)

10 October 1971	Wexford	3-8 - 6-7	Cork	O'Kennedy Park, New Ross
3.30pm	P. Flynn (2-3), S. Kinsella (1-0), L. Griffin (0-3), J. Doran (0-1), C. Dowdall (0-1).		B. Cummins (3-1), C. McCarthy (2-2), S. O'Leary (1-1), T. Ryan (0-1), J. Barrett (0-1), P. Moylan (0-1).	Referee: P. Buggy (Kilkenny)

10 October 1971	Clare	1-4 - 2-8	Limerick	Cusack Park, Ennis
3.30pm	M. Kilmartin (1-0), J. Rochford (0-2), G. Lohan (0-1), P. Russell (0-1).		W. Moore (1-1), M. Graham (1-0), A. Dunworth (0-3), R. Bennis (0-2), É. Grimes (0-2).	Referee: J. Duggan (Galway)

10 October 1971	Dublin	1-9 - 2-11	Offaly	Croke Park, Dublin
3.30pm	S. McShane (1-0), J. Kenny (0-3), M. Bermingham (0-3), G. Pierre (0-2), H. Dalton (0-1).		J. J. Healion (1-1), J. Kirwan (0-4), G. Burke (1-0), B. Lyons (0-1), P. Mulhaire (0-1), A. Barry (0-1), D. Hanniffy (0-1), D. Hennessy (0-1), ? (0-1).	Referee: J. Rankins (Laois)

10 October 1971	Waterford	9-13 - 4-7	Laois	Portlaw
3.30pm	P. Enright (1-8), P. McGrath (2-1), P. Coady (2-0), M. Regan (2-0), J. Flynn (1-0), P. Connors (1-0), B. Power (0-2), M. Hickey (0-1), M. Kirwan (0-1).		S. Cuddy (2-2), G. Lanham (1-2), C. Harrington (1-0), D. Sheahan (0-1), P. Dowling (0-1), F. Keenan (0-1).	Referee: D. O'Brien (Cork)

10 October 1971	Galway	4-15 - 1-7	Kildare	Pearse Stadium, Galway
3.30pm	P. Fahy (2-7), P. J. Molloy (1-3), P. J. Qualter (1-1), P. Ryan (0-2), P. Niland (0-1), T. Murphy (0-1).		J. Walsh (1-6), B. Burke (0-1).	Referee: M. Slattery (Clare)

10 October 1971	Westmeath	2-6 - 5-6	Kerry	Cusack Park, Mullingar
3.30pm	T. Ring (1-4), J. Walsh (1-0), K. Gavin (0-1), J. Keary (0-1).		J. McGrath (2-0), T. Nolan (1-2), T. Cronin (1-1), B. Healy (1-0), D. Lovett (0-1), F. Thornton (0-1), T. McEnery (0-1).	Referee: M. Spain (Offaly)

24 October 1971	Laois	6-8 - 3-9	Wicklow	O'Moore Park, Portlaoise
3.30pm	G. Cuddy (3-2), S. Ciddy (2-2), F. Keenan (1-1), P. Dowling (0-2), P. Dillon (0-1).		T. Morrissey (2-7), L. Kearns (1-0), S. Brennan (0-1), T. Kennedy (0-1).	Referee: M. Spain (Offaly)

24 October 1971	Tipperary	4-9 - 3-12	Wexford	Semple Stadium, Thurles
3.30pm	M. Keating (2-4), P. Byrne (1-0), R. Ryan (1-0), N. O'Dwyer (0-3), J. Lyons (0-1), J. Flanagan (0-1).		C. Dowdall (1-5), P. Flynn (1-1), D. Fortune (1-0), M. Quigley (0-2), J. Galway (0-2), D. Quigley (0-1), M. Browne (0-1).	Referee: G. Kirwan (Offaly)

24 October 1971	Limerick	4-8 - 3-7	Kilkenny	Gaelic Grounds, Limerick
3.30pm	A. Dunworth (2-0), R. Bennis (1-3), É. Grimes (1-2), W. Moore (0-1), É. Cregan (0-1), B. Hartigan (0-1).		E. Keher (2-3), K. Purcell (1-0), P. Delaney (0-2), M. Brennan (0-1), P. Moran (0-1).	Attendance: 7,000; Referee: M. Slattery (Clare)

24 October 1971	Offaly	3-10 - 3-9	Clare	St. Brendan's Park, Birr
3.30pm	G. Burke (2-1), G. Kirwan (0-4), J. McKenna (1-0), P. J. Whelahan (0-3), A. Harry (0-1), W. Gorman (0-1).		M. Moroney (0-8), T. O'Leary (2-0), M. McKeogh (1-0), J. Rochfort (0-1).	Referee: J. Rankins (Laois)

24 October 1971	Antrim	4-16 - 3-6	Westmeath	Fr. Healy Park, Loughguile
3.30pm	S. Richmond (2-4), B. McGarry (1-4), W. Richmond (1-1), T. Kane (0-2), A. McCallin (0-2), B. Campbell (0-2).		T. Ring (1-1), F. McManus (1-0), J. Keary (1-0), L. Maher (0-3), L. Jackson (0-1), J. Gavin (0-1).

24 October 1971	Kerry	3-11 - 4-16	Galway	Austin Stack Park, Tralee
3.30pm	D. Lovett (1-9), T. Nolan (1-1), F. Thornton (1-0), J. O'Sullivan (0-1).		P. J. Molloy (3-1), P. Fahy (0-10), M. O'Connell (1-0), J. Connolly (0-3), B. O'Connor (0-1), S. Murphy (0-1).	Referee: J. Quaid (Limerick)

24 October 1971	Kildare	3-12 - 0-14	Waterford	Naas
3.30pm	J. Walsh (0-11), N. Behan (2-0), R. Burke (1-0), T. Christian (0-1).		P. Enright (0-9), V. Connors (0-1), M. Reagan (0-1), J. Flynn (0-1), M. Hickey (0-1), M. Kirwan (0-1).

7 November 1971	Kilkenny	2-18 - 2-8	Cork	Nowlan Park, Kilkenny
3.30pm	P. Delaney (0-5), E. Keher (0-5), L. O'Brien (1-1), N. Byrne (1-1), P. Moran (0-3), M. Brennan (0-2), K. Purcell (0-1).		C. McCarthy (1-7), J. McCarthy (1-0), W. Walsh (0-1).	Referee: N. Dalton (Waterford)

7 November 1971	Dublin	2-5 - 5-8	Limerick	Croke Park
3.30pm	M. Bermingham (1-2), S. McShane (1-0), H. Dalton (0-2), D. Rheinisch (0-1).		É. Cregan (2-2), W. Moore (1-1), D. Flynn (1-0), M. Graham (1-0), A. Dunworth (0-2), J. Foley (0-2), B. Hartigan (0-1).	Referee: J. Hatton (Wicklow)

7 November 1971	Clare	3-5 - 4-6	Tipperary	Cusack Park, Ennis
3.30pm	M. Morney (2-2), M. Kilmartin (1-0), J. Rochford (0-3).		P. Byrne (2-0), R. Ryan (2-0), F. Loughnane (0-3), J. Ryan (0-1), M. Roche (0-1), M. Hogan (0-1).	Referee: T. English (Tipperary)

7 November 1971	Wexford	3-8 - 2-3	Offaly	Gorey
3.30pm	P. Flynn (3-0), C. Dowdall (0-3), D. Bernie (0-1), M. Browne (0-1), J. Keheo (0-1), M. Quigley (0-1), L. Griffin (0-1).			Referee: J. O'Regan (Waterford)

7 November 1971	Galway	3-9 - 3-8	Antrim	Ballinasloe
3.30pm	P. Fahy (1-4), D. Coen (1-0), B. O'Connor (1-0), P. J. Molloy (0-2), P. J. Qualter (0-2), M. O'Connell (0-1).		S. Richmond (1-2), B. McGarry (1-1), P. McAlhatton (1-0), W. Richmond (0-2), S. Burns (0-2), A. McCamphill (0-1).	Referee: E. Doherty (Westmeath)

7 November 1971	Waterford	4-14 - 2-8	Kerry	Fraher Field, Dungarvan
3.30pm	P. Enright (2-5), J. Wall (1-0), D. Ormonde (1-0), T. Doyle (0-3), M. Hickey (0-2), J. Kirwan (0-2), V. Connors (0-2).		D. Lovett (2-4), J. O'Sullivan (0-1), T. Kirby (0-1), B. Healy (0-1), T. Molan (0-1).	Referee: F. Murphy (Cork)

7 November 1971	Laois	2-11 - 1-6	Kildare	O'Moore Park, Portlaoise
3.30pm	P. Dillon (1-3), F. Keenan (1-2), T. Keenan (0-2), S. Cuddy (0-1), B. Delaney (0-1), P. Dowling (0-1), D. Sheeran (0-1).		J. Walsh (0-6), R. Burke (1-0).	Referee: )

7 November 1971	Wicklow	4-10 - 1-2	Westmeath	Aughrim County Ground, Aughrim
3.30pm	T. Morrissey (2-1), M. Delaney (1-2), A. Doyle (1-1), P. Sheehan (0-3), S. Doyle (0-1), T. McCarthy (0-1), M. O'Brien (0-1).		L. Jackson (1-0), F. McManus (0-1), C. Gavin (0-1).	Referee: C. Foley (Dublin)

21 November 1971	Offaly	1-6 - 0-16	Kilkenny	St. Brendan's Park, Birr
3.00pm	J. Kirwan (1-0), B. Moylan (0-3), P. J. Conroy (0-2), P. Mulcaire (0-1).		E. Keher (0-7), J. Kinsella (0-3), P. Moran (0-2), M. Brennan (0-2), L. O'Brien (0-1), P. Delaney (0-1).	Referee: J. Moloney (Tipperary)

21 November 1971	Tipperary	3-9 - 1-8	Dublin	St. Cronan's Park, Nenagh
2.30pm	M. Keating (2-4), W. O'Grady (1-0), D. Ryan (0-2), R. Ryan (0-1), F. Loughnane (0-1), P. Byrne (0-1).		M. Bermingham (1-5), H. Dalton (0-2), V. Holden (0-1).	Referee: G. Kirwan (Offaly)

21 November 1971	Cork	5-7 - 5-7	Clare	Cork Athletic Grounds, Cork
2.30pm	M. Sheehan (2-2), B. Cummins (1-0), S. O'Leary (1-0), T. Ryan (1-0), C. Kelly (0-3), R. O'Sullivan (0-1), P. Hegarty (0-1).		N. Casey (3-0), M. Moroney (1-4), M. Keogh (1-1), M. Kilmartin (0-1), J. McNamara (0-1).	Referee: S. O'Connor (Limerick)

21 November 1971	Limerick	3-6 - 0-8	Wexford	Gaelic Grounds, Limerick
2.30pm	W. Moore (2-0), É. Grimes (1-2), A. Dunworth (0-2), B. Hartigan (0-1), M. Cregan (0-1).		P. Flynn (0-3), C. Dowdall (0-3), J. Quigley (0-1), D. Bernie (0-1).	Referee: M. Slattery (Clare)

21 November 1971	Westmeath	0-11 - 3-11	Galway	Cusack Park, Mullingar
2.30pm	C. Connaughton (0-3), J. Keary (0-3), C. Gavin (0-2), O. Egan (0-2), F. McManus (0-1).		D. Coen (1-5), S. Murphy (1-1), B. O'Connor (1-1), J. Connolly (0-2), P. J. Qualter (0-1), P. Murphy (0-1).	Referee: J. Rankins (Laois)

21 November 1971	Antrim	Postponed	Waterford	Casement Park, Belfast
2.30pm				Referee: T. Devlin (Tyrone)

21 November 1971	Kerry	0-9 - 5-7	Laois	Austin Stack Park, Tralee
2.30pm	D. Lovett (0-6), T. Nolan (0-2), J. Brick (0-1).		P. Dillon (1-2), S. Cuddy (1-2), G. Lanham (1-1), G. Cuddy (1-0), M. Dawson (1-0), F. Keenan (0-2).	Referee: J. FitzGerald (Limerick)

21 November 1971	Kildare	1-6 - 2-7	Wicklow	Naas
2.30pm	R. Burke (1-1), J. Walsh (0-3), P. Dunny (0-2).		M. O'Brien (0-4), P. Berkerry (1-0), J. Brennan (1-0), M. Delaney (0-2), T. Kennedy (0-1).	Referee: J. Shepherd (Carlow)

5 December 1971	Offaly	1-7 - 2-11	Limerick	St. Brendan's Park, Birr
2.30pm	M. Cleere (1-4), K. Kirwan (0-1), P. Mulhare (0-1), D. Hanniffy (0-1).		R. Bennis (0-7), M. Graham (1-2), A. Dunworth (1-0), W. Moore (0-1), É. Cregan (0-1).	Referee: J. Moloney (Tipperary)

5 December 1971	Cork	1-9 - 1-11	Tipperary	Cork Athletic Grounds, Cork
2.30pm	T. Ryan (0-6), B. Cummins (1-0), C. Kelly (0-1), R. Cummins (0-1), S. Looney (0-1).		M. Keating (1-2), M. Roche (0-3), D. Ryan (0-2), J. Flanagan (0-2), N. O'Dwyer (0-1), F. Loughnane (0-1).	Referee: S. O'Regan (Waterford)

5 December 1971	Clare	4-10 - 2-13	Dublin	Ruan
2.30pm	M. Moroney (2-6), N. Casey (1-1), M. Keane (1-0), M. Kilmartin (0-2), J. Rochford (0-1).		M. Bermingham (0-7), V. Holden (0-5), J. Towhill (1-0), D. Rheinlisch (1-0), B. Cooney (0-1).	Referee: S. O'Connor (Limerick)

5 December 1971	Kilkenny	1-14 - 1-9	Wexford	Nowlan Park, Kilkenny
2.30pm	E. Keher (0-11), N. Byrne (1-0), L. O'Brien (0-1), M. Brennan (0-1), J. Kinsella (0-1).		E. Buggy (1-5), J. Higgins (0-2), C. Dowdall (0-1), M. Jacob (0-1).	Referee: N. Dalton (Waterford)

5 December 1971	Galway	1-6 - 2-3	Wicklow	Portumna
2.30pm	B. O'Connor (1-1), J. Connolly (0-3), D. Coen (0-2).		M. Delaney (1-1), T. McCarthy (1-0), C. Keddy (0-1), P. Berkery (0-1).	Referee: E. O'Brien (Westmeath)

5 December 1971	Waterford	3-11 - 1-8	Westmeath	Walsh Park, Waterford
2.30pm	P. Enright (0-7), V. Connors (2-0), T. Doyle (1-0), J. Kirwan (0-2), M. Hickey (0-1), S. Power (0-1).		O. Egan (0-5), C. Gavin (1-0), P. Monaghan (0-2), J. Moore (0-1).	Referee: M. Bowe (New Ross)

5 December 1971	Laois	4-5 - 2-7	Antrim	O'Moore Park, Portlaoise
2.30pm	S. Cuddy (2-0), B. Delaney (2-0), D. Sheeran (0-3), M. Ryan (0-1), P. Dillon (0-1).		A. McCallion (1-2), W. Richmond (1-0), P. McSheran (0-3), S. Burns (0-1), A. Hamill (0-1).	Referee: M. Spain (Offaly)

5 December 1971	Kildare	5-10 - 2-8	Kerry	St. Conleth's Park, Newbridge
2.30pm	N. Behan (3-1), J. Walsh (0-9), P. Dunny (1-0), M. O'Brien (1-0).		D. Lovett (1-2), T. Lyons (1-1), B. Twomey (0-2), T. Nolan (0-1), P. Sheehan (0-1), P. Moriarty (0-1).	Referee: J. Hatton (Wicklow)

19 December 1971	Cork	3-8 - 4-7	Dublin	Cork Athletic Grounds, Cork
2.30pm	T. Ryan (1-3), R. Cummins (1-1), B. Cummins (1-0), P. Hegarty (0-2), W. Walsh (0-1), S. Murphy (0-1).		M. Bermingham (1-5), H. Dalton (1-0), V. Holden (1-0), F. Murphy (0-1), F. Cooney (0-1), P. J. Holden (0-1).	Referee: S. O'Connor (Limerick)

19 December 1971	Wicklow	1-5 - 3-6	Antrim	Aughrim County Ground, Aughrim
2.30pm	M. O'Brien (1-0), M. Delaney (0-2), C. Keddy (0-2), T. McCarthy (0-1).		S. Richmond (2-2), E. Donnelly (1-2), B. McGarry (0-1), A. Hamill (0-1).	Referee: B. O'Dowd (Wexford)

13 February 1972	Limerick	5-8 - 7-3	Cork	Gaelic Grounds, Limerick
3.00pm	W. Moore (3-0), M. Graham (2-0), R. Bennis (0-6), D. Flynn (0-1), B. Hartigan (0-1).		S. O'Leary (3-1), C. McCarthy (1-1), D. Collins (1-0), M. Malone (1-0), P. Hegarty (1-0), S. Murphy (0-1).	Referee: J. Moloney (Tipperary)

13 February 1972	Dublin	0-10 - 5-10	Kilkenny	Croke Park, Dublin
3.00pm	V. Holden (0-3), M. Bermingham (0-3), H. Dalton (0-2), E. Flynn (0-2).		E. Keher (2-4), N. Byrne (2-0), K. Purcell (1-1), F. Cummins (0-2), P. Delaney (0-2), W. Murphy (0-1).	Referee: J. Hatton (Wicklow)

13 February 1972	Wexford	4-6 - 1-4	Clare	O'Kennedy Park, New Ross
3.00pm	T. Doran (2-1), J. Quirke (1-0), M. Jacob (1-0), C. Dowdall (0-3), P. Flynn (0-2).		M. Kilmartin (1-0), N. Casey (0-2), W. Moroney (0-2).	Referee: J. Dunphy (Waterford)

13 February 1972	Tipperary	3-8 - 1-10	Offaly	Semple Stadium, Thurles
3.00pm	F. Loughnane (2-2), M. Keating (1-4), J. Flanagan (0-1), S. Hogan (0-1).		B. Moylan (0-8), J. Kirwan (1-2).

13 February 1972	Galway	2-12 - 2-5	Waterford	Pearse Stadium, Galway
3.00pm	D. Coen (1-4), P. J. Qualter (1-0), J. Connolly (0-3), B. O'Connor (0-2), M. Donoghue (0-1), A. Fenton (0-1), J. Rabbit (0-1).		P. Enright (1-3), V. Connors (1-0), S. Power (0-1), P. McGrath (0-1).	Referee: E. O'Brien (Westmeath)

13 February 1972	Westmeath	1-3 - 5-9	Laois	Cusack Park, Mullingar
3.00pm	C. Gavin (1-0), M. Jackson (0-1), T. Ring (0-1), F. McManus (0-1).		G. Cuddy (3-0), P. Dillon (1-2), G. Lanham (1-1), D. Sheeran (0-3), J. Dooley (0-1), G. Conroy (0-1), S. Cuddy (0-1).	Referee: J. Kirwan (Offaly)

13 February 1972	Antrim	3-9 - 2-10	Kildare	Ballycastle
3.00pm	W. Richmond (1-3), S. Richmond (1-2), B. McGarry (1-1), N. Wheeler (0-1), E. Donnelly (0-1). P. Cunning (0-1).		M. Dwan (2-4), J. Walsh (0-6).	Referee: E. Devlin (Tyrone)

13 February 1972	Wicklow	2-7 - 2-11	Kerry	Pearse Park, Arklow
3.00pm	M. Delaney (1-5), L. Collins (1-0), T. Morrissey (0-1), T. McCarthy (0-1).		P. Moriarty (1-3), T. McEnery (0-4), J. Sullivan (1-0), F. Thornton (0-2), J. Grady (0-1), M. FitzGerald (0-1).	Referee: R. Shepherd (Carlow)

5 March 1972	Dublin	5-6 - 4-13	Wexford	Croke Park, Dublin
3.30pm	E. Flynn (3-5), M. Bermingham (2-0), F. Murphy (0-1).		C. Dowdall (1-5), C. Kehoe (1-2), P. Flynn (1-1), J. Murphy (1-0), P. Wilson (0-3), M. Jacob (0-1), T. Doran (0-1).	Referee: J. Hatton (Wicklow)

5 March 1972	Clare	3-16 - 4-7	Kilkenny	Daly Park, Tulla
3.00pm	M. Moroney (1-4), N. Casey (0-7), M. Kilmartin (1-0), T. Crowe (1-0), J. Callinan (0-3), M. McKeogh (0-2).		E. Keher (1-5), M. Brennan (1-1), K. Purcell (1-0), L. O'Brien (1-0), P. Delaney (0-1).	Referee: S. O'Connor (Limerick)

5 March 1972	Tipperary	Postponed	Limerick	Semple Stadium, Thurles
3.00pm

5 March 1972	Kerry	3-12 - 3-9	Antrim	Croke Park, Dublin
3.30pm	P. Moriarty (2-1), J. Sullivan (1-1), D. Lovett (0-4), N. Power (0-3), T. McEnery (0-1), P. J. McIntyre (0-1), T. Nolan (0-1).		R. McGarry (2-2), E. Donnelly (0-4), A. McCallin (1-0), S. Richmond (0-3).	Referee: G. Foley (Dublin)

5 March 1972	Kildare	1-13 - 3-3	Westmeath	Geraldine Park, Athy
3.00pm	J. Walsh (0-10), N. Behan (1-0), B. Burke (0-1), M. O'Brien (0-1), J. O'Leary (0-1).		K. Gavin (1-0), P Monaghan (1-0), J. Carey (1-0), T. Ring (0-3).	Referee: M. Maher (Dublin)

5 March 1972	Laois	4-8 - 7-0	Galway	O'Moore Park, Portlaoise
3.15pm	S. Cuddy (2-1), G. Lanham (1-1), G. Conroy (1-0), P. Dillon (0-3), D. Sheeran (0-2), P. Dowling (0-1).		T. Ryan (3-0), M. Donoghue (1-0), P. Fahy (1-0), B. O'Connor (1-0), P. J. Molloy (1-0).

5 March 1972	Waterford	3-4 - 1-8	Wicklow	Walsh Park, Waterford
3.00pm	M. Ormond (1-1), M. Kirwan (1-0), P. Coady (1-0), J. Kirwan (0-1), M. Hickey (0-1), P. McGrath (0-1).		T. Kennedy (1-0), T. Morrissey (0-2), M. O'Brien (0-2), S. Brennan (0-2), P. Berkery (0-1), M. Delaney (0-1).

19 March 1972	Tipperary	4-7 - 2-11	Limerick	Semple Stadium, Thurles
	F. Loughnane (1-5), R. Ryan (2-0), P. Byrne (1-1), J. Flanagan (0-1).		R. Bennis (0-5), É. Grimes (1-1), M. Graham (1-1), A. Dunworth (0-2), D. Flynn (0-1), É. Cregan (0-1).	Referee: N. Dalton (Waterford)

19 March 1972	Offaly	1-3 - 6-6	Cork	St. Brendan's Park, Birr
	J. Kirwan (1-0), D. Hanniffy (0-1), J. McKenna (0-1), P. J. Whelahan (0-1).		C. McCarthy (3-3), S. O'Leary (3-0), R. Cummins (0-1), M. Malone (0-1), T. Ryan (0-1).	Referee: S. O'Connor (Limerick)

19 March 1972	Waterford	2-15 - 0-7	Antrim	Walsh Park, Waterford
	M. Ormond (0-6), M. Hickey (0-5), S. Greene (1-1), V. Connors (1-0), J. Whelan (0-2), J. Kirwan (0-1).		A. McCamphill (0-2), C. McDonnell (0-2), R. McGarry (0-2), P. McShane (0-1).	Referee: J. Bowe (Wexford)

=== Knock-out stage ===
9 April 1972 Quarter-final	Cork	4-12 - 1-5	Galway	Gaelic Grounds, Limerick
	C. McCarthy (2-8), S. O'Leary (1-1), R. Cummins (1-0), D. Collins (0-2), P. Hegarty (0-1).		P. J. Qualter (1-0), P. Fahy (0-3), D. Coen (0-1), J. Connolly (0-1).	Referee: G. FitzGerald (Limerick)

9 April 1972 Quarter-final	Waterford	3-10 - 4-10	Kilkenny	Walsh Park, Waterford
	S. Greene (2-0), P. Coady (1-2), M. Hickey (0-4), M. Ormonde (0-4).		E. Keher (0-6), J. Kinsella (1-2), P. Delaney (1-1), M. Brennan (1-0), K. Purcell (1-0), F. Cummins (0-1).	Referee: F. Murphy (Cork)

16 April 1972 Semi-final	Cork	5-12 - 4-8	Tipperary	Gaelic Grounds, Limerick
3.30pm	C. McCarthy (1-9), R. Cummins (2-1), S. O'Leary (2-0), D. Collins (0-1), M. Malone (0-1).		F. Loughnane (1-6), R. Ryan (2-0), J. Flanagan (1-0), M. Roche (0-1), N. O'Dwyer (0-1).	Attendance: 15,890; Referee: S. O'Connor (Limerick)

23 April 1972 Semi-final	Limerick	3-13 - 2-13	Kilkenny	Semple Stadium, Thurles
3.30pm	R. Bennis (2-7), W. Moore (1-1), É. Cregan (0-2), É. Grimes (0-2), J. Foley (0-1).		E. Keher (0-8), P. Delaney (1-2), K. Purcell (1-0), J. Kinsella (0-2), M. Coogan (0-1).	Attendance: 20,000; Referee: F. Murphy (Cork)

7 May 1972 Final	Cork	3-14 - 2-14	Limerick	Semple Stadium, Thurles
3:30 p.m.	D. Collins (1-2), S. O'Leary (1-2), C. McCarthy (0-5), C. Roche (1-0), M. Malone (0-2), J. McCarthy (0-2), R. Cummins (0-1).		R. Bennis (1-6), É. Cregan (1-2), É. Grimes (0-3), W. Moore (0-1), B. Hartigan (0-1), F. Nolan (0-1).	Attendance: 30,000; Referee: J. Moloney (Tipperary)

== League statistics ==
=== Scoring ===
- Widest winning margin: 21 points
  - Waterford 9-13 : 4-7 Laois
- Most goals in a match: 13
  - Waterford 9-13 : 4-7 Laois
- Most points in a match: 28
  - Cork 3-14 : 2-14 Limerick
- Most goals by one team in a match: 9
  - Waterford 9-13 : 4-7 Laois
- Most goals scored by a losing team: 5
  - Dublin 5-6 : 4-13 Wexford
- Most points scored by a losing team: 14
  - Waterford 0-14 : 3-12 Kildare
  - Limerick 2-14 : 3-14 Cork

== Top scorers ==
=== Season ===
Rank	Player	County	Tally	Total	Matches	Average
1	Eddie Keher	Kilkenny	5-56	71		
2	Charlie McCarthy	Cork	10-35	65		
3	Johnny Walsh	Kildare	2-51	57		
4	Richie Bennis	Limerick	4-36	48		
5	Pat Enright	Waterford	4-32	44		
6	Seánie O'Leary	Cork	12-5	41		

=== Single game ===
Rank	Player	County	Tally	Total	Opposition
1	Éamonn Flynn	Dublin	3-5	14	Wexford
1	Charlie McCarthy	Cork	2-8	14	Galway
3	Paddy Fahy	Galway	2-7	13	Kildare
3	T. Morrissey	Wicklow	2-7	13	Laois
5	Charlie McCarthy	Cork	3-3	12	Offaly
5	Michael Moroney	Clare	2-6	12	Dublin
5	Declan Lovett	Kerry	1-9	12	Galway
5	Charlie McCarthy	Cork	1-9	12	Tipperary
9	Ger Cuddy	Laois	3-2	11	Wicklow
9	Pat Enright	Waterford	2-5	11	Kerry
9	Pat Enright	Waterford	1-8	11	Laois
9	Johnny Walsh	Kildare	0-11	11	Waterford
9	Eddie Keher	Kilkenny	0-11	11	Wexford
14	Brendan Cummins	Cork	3-1	10	Wexford
14	P. J. Molloy	Galway	3-1	10	Kerry
14	Nick Behan	Kildare	3-1	10	Kerry
14	Seánie O'Leary	Cork	3-1	10	Limerick
14	Michael Keating	Tipperary	2-4	10	Wexford
14	Séamus Richmond	Antrim	2-4	10	Westmeath
14	Declan Lovett	Kerry	2-4	10	Waterford
14	Michael Keating	Tipperary	2-4	10	Dublin
14	Eddie Keher	Kilkenny	2-4	10	Dublin
14	Mick Dwan	Kildare	2-4	10	Antrim
14	Charlie McCarthy	Cork	1-7	10	Kilkenny
14	Paddy Fahy	Galway	0-10	10	Kerry
14	Johnny Walsh	Kildare	0-10	10	Westmeath
27	P Flynn	Wexford	3-0	9	Offaly
27	N Casey	Clare	3-0	9	Cork
27	Willie Moore	Limerick	3-0	9	Cork
27	Ger Cuddy	Laois	3-0	9	Westmeath
27	Tom Ryan	Galway	3-0	9	Laois
27	Seánie O'Leary	Cork	3-0	9	Offaly
27	P Flynn	Wexford	2-3	9	Cork
27	Eddie Keher	Kilkenny	2-3	9	Limerick
27	Johnny Walsh	Kildare	1-6	9	Galway
27	Francis Loughnane	Tipperary	1-6	9	Cork
27	Richie Bennis	Limerick	1-6	9	Cork
27	Pat Enright	Waterford	0-9	9	Kildare
27	Johnny Walsh	Kildare	0-9	9	Kerry
