= Shay Cash =

Irish Gaelic footballer

Séamus Cash
Personal information
- Native name: Séamus Ó Cais (Irish)
- Nickname: Shay
- Born: 1945 Newbridge, County Kildare, Ireland
- Occupation: Painter
- Height: 5 ft 10 in (178 cm)

Sport
- Sport: Gaelic football
- Position: Full-back
Club
- Years: Club
- Sarsfields
Club titles
- Kildare titles: 0
Inter-county
- Years: County
- Kildare
Inter-county titles
- Leinster titles: 0
- All-Irelands: 0
- NFL: 0
- All Stars: 0

Séamus "Shay" Cash (born 1945) is an Irish former Gaelic footballer. At club level, he played with Sarsfields and he was also a member of the Kildare senior football team.

== Career ==
Cash played his club Gaelic football with Sarsfields, however, his senior team career coincided with a barren spell in terms of success for the club.

At inter-county level, Cash was part of the Kildare team that won consecutive Leinster U21FC titles as well as the All-Ireland U21FC title in 1965. He later made several appearances for the senior team.

== Honours ==
Kildare

- All-Ireland Under-21 Football Championship: 1965
- Leinster Under-21 Football Championship: 1965, 1966
