= Pauge Harmon =

Irish Gaelic footballer (1945–2024)

Patrick Harmon
Personal information
- Native name: Pádraig Ó hArgadáin (Irish)
- Nickname: Pauge
- Born: 1945 Castledermot, County Kildare, Ireland
- Died: 12 March 2024 (aged 78) Celbridge, County Kildare, Ireland
- Height: 5 ft 10 in (178 cm)

Sport
- Sport: Gaelic football
- Position: Centre-back
Club
- Years: Club
- Castledermot
Club titles
- Kildare titles: 0
Inter-county
- Years: County
- Kildare
Inter-county titles
- Leinster titles: 0
- All-Irelands: 0
- NFL: 0
- All Stars: 0

Patrick "Pauge" Harmon (1945 – 12 March 2024) was an Irish Gaelic footballer. At club level, he played with Castledermot and he was also a member of the Kildare senior football team.

== Career ==
Harmon first played Gaelic football at club level with Castledermot. He was part of the club team that won the Kildare IFC title in 1963. At inter-county level, Harmon was part of the Kildare team that won consecutive Leinster U21FC titles as well as the All-Ireland U21FC title in 1965. He later made several appearances with the senior team.

== Death ==
Harmon died on 12 March 2024, at the age of 78.

== Honours ==
Castledermot

- Kildare Intermediate Football Championship: 1963

Kildare

- All-Ireland Under-21 Football Championship: 1965
- Leinster Under-21 Football Championship: 1965, 1966
