= Seán O'Reilly (Gaelic footballer) =

Irish Gaelic footballer

Personal information
- Native name: Seán Ó Raghallaigh (Irish)
- Born: 1946 Caragh, County Kildare, Ireland
- Occupation: Electrician
- Height: 5 ft 7 in (170 cm)

Sport
- Sport: Gaelic football
- Position: Right wing-back
Club
- Years: Club
- Raheens
Inter-county
- Years: County
- Kildare
Inter-county titles
- Leinster titles: 0
- All-Irelands: 0
- NFL: 0
- All Stars: 0

Seán O'Reilly (born 1946) is an Irish former Gaelic footballer. At club level, he played with Raheens and he was also a member of the Kildare senior football team.

== Career ==
O'Reilly first played Gaelic football at club level with Raheens. He was part of the club's senior team that won Kildare SFC titles in 1964 and 1968. At inter-county level, O'Reilly was part of the Kildare team that won consecutive Leinster U21FC titles as well as the All-Ireland U21FC title in 1965. He later made several appearances with the senior team.

== Honours ==
Raheens

- Kildare Senior Football Championship: 1964, 1968

Kildare

- All-Ireland Under-21 Football Championship: 1965
- Leinster Under-21 Football Championship: 1965, 1966
