= 1847 in sports =

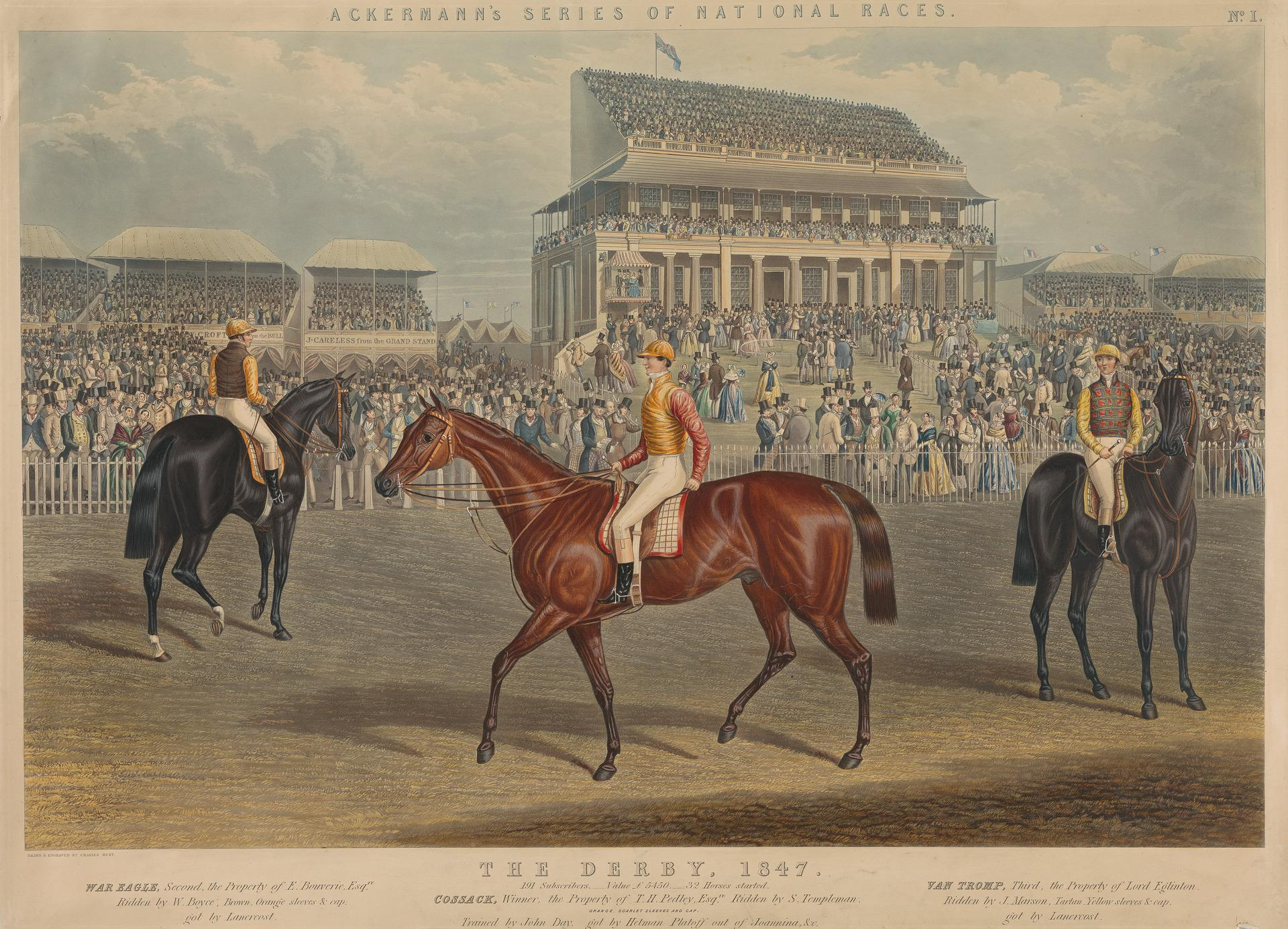
Depiction of the derby from 1847

1847 in sports describes the year's events in world sport.

== Baseball ==
Events

- Army of occupation plays baseball in Santa Barbara, California, alienating the local people.

== Boxing ==
Events

- William Thompson retains the Championship of England but there is no record of any fights involving him in 1847.

== Cricket ==
Events

- William Clarke's All-England Eleven (AEE), formed in 1846, becomes a major attraction and plays numerous matches throughout England

England

- Most runs – Nicholas Felix 591 @ 28.14 (HS 113)
- Most wickets – William Hillyer 134 @ 16.15 (BB 8–?)

== Football ==
Events

- Another set of public school rules is created at Harrow which, like Eton, plays the "dribbling game".

== Horse racing ==
England

- Grand National – Mathew
- 1,000 Guineas Stakes – Clementina
- 2,000 Guineas Stakes – Conyngham
- The Derby – Cossack
- The Oaks – Miami
- St. Leger Stakes – Van Tromp

== Rowing ==
The Boat Race

- The Oxford and Cambridge Boat Race is not held this year
