= Pat Mangan =

Irish Gaelic footballer

Personal information
- Native name: Pádraig Ó Mongáin (Irish)
- Born: 1946 Carbury, County Kildare, Ireland
- Height: 5 ft 11 in (180 cm)

Sport
- Sport: Gaelic football
- Position: Midfield
Club
- Years: Club
- Carbury
Club titles
- Kildare titles: 7
Inter-county
- Years: County
- Kildare
Inter-county titles
- Leinster titles: 0
- All-Irelands: 0
- NFL: 0
- All Stars: 0

Patrick Mangan (born 1946) is an Irish former Gaelic footballer. At club level, he played with Carbury and he was also a member of the Kildare senior football team.

== Career ==
Mangan played his club Gaelic football with Carbury at a time when the club's senior team had a number of successes. He won seven Kildare SFC titles in a 20-year club career.

At inter-county level, Mangan was part of the Kildare team that won consecutive Leinster U21FC titles as well as the All-Ireland U21FC title in 1965. He later spent several years with the senior team but lost six leinster SFC finals between 1966 and 1978. Mangan also won a Railway Cup medal with Leinster in 1974.

== Post-playing career ==
Mangan was named as midfield partner to Larry Stanley on the Kildare Football Team of the Millennium in 2000.

== Honours ==
Carbury

- Kildare Senior Football Championship: 1965, 1966, 1969, 1971, 1972, 1974, 1985

Kildare

- All-Ireland Under-21 Football Championship: 1965
- Leinster Under-21 Football Championship: 1965, 1966

Leinster

- Railway Cup: 1974
