= Pat Nally (Gaelic footballer) =

Irish Gaelic footballer

Personal information
- Native name: Pádraig Mac an Fhailí (Irish)
- Born: 1945 Balla, County Mayo, Ireland
- Height: 5 ft 10 in (178 cm)

Sport
- Sport: Gaelic football
- Position: Centre-back
Club
- Years: Club
- Carbury
Club titles
- Kildare titles: 6
Inter-county
- Years: County
- Kildare
Inter-county titles
- Leinster titles: 0
- All-Irelands: 0
- NFL: 0
- All Stars: 0

Patrick Nally (born 1945) is an Irish former Gaelic footballer. At club level, he played with Carbury and he was also a member of the Kildare senior football team.

== Career ==
Nally was born in Balla, County Mayo, but moved to Carbury, County Kildare at a young age. He played his club football with Carbury and won six Kildare SFC titles between 1965 and 1974.

At inter-county level, Nally was part of the Kildare team that won consecutive Leinster U21FC titles as well as the All-Ireland U21FC title in 1965. He later spent several years with the senior team but lost two leinster SFC finals in 1966 and 1969.

== Honours ==
Carbury

- Kildare Senior Football Championship: 1965, 1966, 1969, 1971, 1972, 1974

Kildare

- All-Ireland Under-21 Football Championship: 1965
- Leinster Under-21 Football Championship: 1965, 1966
