= J. J. Cribbin =

Gaelic footballer (1946–2020)

Personal information
- Born: June 1946
- Died: 8 May 2020 (aged 73)
- Occupation: Priest

Sport
- Position: Full-forward
Club
- Years: Club
- Ballyhaunis
Inter-county
Years	County	Apps (scores)
c. 1969–1972	Mayo	24 (12–31)
Inter-county titles
	Football	Hurling
League titles	1	0

J. J. Cribbin (Note: Some sources use the spelling "Cribben". However, most sources — including the subject's own death notice — use the spelling "Cribbin".) (June 1946 – 8 May 2020) was a Gaelic footballer who played as full-forward for Ballyhaunis, St Jarlath's College and the Mayo county team (minor, under-21 and senior).

He won the 1969–70 National Football League with Mayo — the county's first trophy at that level since 1954 — and scored two goals and a point against Down in the NFL final. His funeral occurred 50 years to the day of this match.

== Biography ==
Cribbin was born in June 1946 in Ballyhaunis in County Mayo, to Anthony and Mariah. He studied at St Jarlath's College in Tuam. He then trained to be a priest at St Patrick's College, Maynooth. While there, he became one of the earliest seminarians to receive permission to play football and played for Mayo in the final of the 1967 All-Ireland Under-21 Football Championship. He had previously played at Croke Park in three minor campaigns for the county, in 1962 (finalist, aged 16), 1963 (semi-finalist), and 1964 (semi-finalist again).

Cribbin won the 1969–70 National Football League with Mayo — the county's first trophy at that level since 1954 — and scored two goals and a point against Down in the NFL final. Mayo then finished as league runner-up to Kerry in 1971 and 1972. He had less than four years of playing at the elite level due to injuries. His final match as a Mayo player was against Roscommon in the 1972 Connacht Senior Football Championship. With his club Ballyhaunis, Cribbin played in the same team as his brothers Tom Short and Tony (Toto). In retirement from playing, Cribbin coached underage teams including Breaffy National School.

Cribbin was ordained in 1970. He began working as Prefect of Studies at St Jarlath's College. He was later curate in Taugheen, Breaffy, Castlebar and Athenry, before being made parish priest of Milltown, County Galway, in 1998. He was both The Very Reverend and Canon.

He died of an illness at Mayo University Hospital on the morning of 8 May 2020. His funeral occurred exactly 50 years after the NFL final in which he scored two goals.
