= 1998 All-Ireland Under-21 Football Championship =

Gaelic football competition

Championship details

All-Ireland Champions
- Winning team: Kerry (9th win)
- Captain: Brian Scanlon
- Managers: Jack O'Connor

All-Ireland Finalists
- Losing team: Laois

Provincial Champions
- Munster: Kerry
- Leinster: Laois
- Ulster: Armagh
- Connacht: Galway

The 1998 All-Ireland Under-21 Football Championship was the 35th staging of the All-Ireland Under-21 Football Championship since its establishment by the Gaelic Athletic Association in 1964.

Derry entered the championship as defending champions, however, they were defeated by Armagh in the Ulster final.

On 9 May 1998, Kerry won the championship following a 2-8 to 0-11 defeat of Laois in the All-Ireland final. This was their ninth All-Ireland title overall and their first in two championship seasons.

== Results ==
=== All-Ireland Under-21 Football Championship ===
Semi-finals

25 April 1998 Semi-final	Laois	0-13 - 1-09	Galway	Pearse Park, Longford

2 May 1998 Semi-final	Kerry	1-11 - 1-09	Armagh	Parnell Park, Dublin

Finals

9 May 1998 Final	Kerry	2-08 - 0-11	Laois	Gaelic Grounds, Limerick

== Statistics ==
=== Miscellaneous ===
- Armagh win the Ulster title for the first time in their history.
