= 1997 All-Ireland Under-21 Football Championship =

Gaelic football competition

1997 All-Ireland Senior Football Championship
Championship details
- Teams: 31

All-Ireland Champions
- Winning team: Derry (2nd win)
- Captain: Johnny McBride

All-Ireland Finalists
- Losing team: Meath

Provincial Champions
- Munster: Kerry
- Leinster: Meath
- Ulster: Derry
- Connacht: Mayo

Championship statistics

The 1997 All-Ireland Under-20 Football Championship was the 34th staging of the All-Ireland Under-21 Championship since its establishment by the Gaelic Athletic Association in 1964.

Kerry entered the championship as the defending champions, however, they were beaten by Meath in the All-Ireland semi-final.

The All-Ireland final was played on 10 May 1997 at St. Tiernach's Park in Clones, between Derry and Meath, in what was their first meeting in a final. Derry won the match by 1–12 to 0–05 to claim their second championship title overall and a first title since 1968.
