= Declan Lovett =

Irish hurler and Gaelic footballer

Personal information
- Native name: Déaglán Mac Lomhaid (Irish)
- Born: 1944 (age 81–82) Kilmoyley, County Kerry, Ireland
- Occupation: Primary school principal

Sport
- Football Position: Right corner-forward
- Hurling Position: Full-forward
Clubs
- Years: Club
- Kilmoyley; Ardfert
Club titles
	Football	Hurling
Kerry titles	0	5
Inter-county
- Years: County
- 1964-1968 1962-1973: Kerry (SF); Kerry (SH)
Inter-county titles
	Football	Hurling
Munster Titles	1	0
All-Ireland Titles	0	0
League titles	0	0

Brian Declan Lovett (born 1944) is an Irish former hurler and Gaelic footballer. At club level he played with Kilmoyley and Ardfert and was also a member of the Kerry senior teams as a dual player.

== Career ==
Born in Kilmoyley, County Kerry, Lovett first played Gaelic football as a boarder at St. Brendan's College in Killarney. As a member of Kilmoyley GAA club, he joined the senior team while still a minor and won three successive Kerry SHC titles from 1962 to 1964. Lovett claimed further county honours in 1970 and 1971.

Lovett first appeared on the inter-county scene as a member of the Kerry minor football team that beat Mayo in the 1962 All-Ireland minor final. He also made his first appearances with the Kerry junior hurling team that year. Lovett also spent four years in the under-21 grade as a Gaelic footballer and won an All-Ireland U21FC medal in 1964.

Lovett first played for the senior team during the 1964–65 NFL. He later won consecutive Division 2 titles as a hurler in 1967 and 1968. As a member of the Kerry junior football team, Lovett won an All-Ireland JFC medal after a defeat of London in 1967. This victory resulted in him once again joining the senior team and he was an unused substitute when Down beat Kerry in the 1968 All-Ireland final.

== Personal life ==
Lovett spent 41 years as a teacher at Kilmoyley NS. He became principal of the school in 1971 and retired in 2004.

== Honours ==
Kilmoyley

- Kerry Senior Hurling Championship: 1962, 1963, 1964, 1970, 1971

Kerry

- Munster Senior Football Championship: 1968
- National Hurling League Division 2: 1966–67, 1967–68
- All-Ireland Junior Football Championship: 1967
- Munster Junior Football Championship: 1967
- All-Ireland Under-21 Football Championship: 1964
- Munster Under-21 Football Championship: 1962, 1964
- All-Ireland Minor Football Championship: 1962
- Munster Minor Football Championship: 1962
