= Walter Enright =

Walter Enright may refer to:

- Walter J. Enright, American cartoonist
- Walter John Enright, Australian solicitor and amateur anthropologist
