= Jack Russell (Cork hurler) =

Irish hurler and coach

Personal information
- Native name: Seán Ruiséil (Irish)
- Born: 1945 (age 80–81) Ballyhea, County Cork, Ireland

Sport
- Sport: Hurling
- Position: Centre-back
Clubs
- Years: Club
- Ballyhea; Blackrock; Avondhu
Club titles
- Cork titles: 2
- Munster titles: 1
- All-Ireland Titles: 1
Inter-county*
Years	County	Apps (scores)
1966-1973	Cork	1 (0-00)
Inter-county titles
- Munster titles: 0
- All-Irelands: 0
- NHL: 0
- All Stars: 0
- *Inter County team apps and scores correct as of 21:50, 21 March 2019.

Jack Russell (born 1945) is an Irish former hurler and coach who played for club sides Ballyhea and Blackrock. He played for the Cork senior hurling team at various times over a seven-year period, during which time he usually lined out as a centre-back.

Russell began his hurling career at club level with Ballyhea. He broke onto the club's top adult team in the early 1960s before joining the Blackrock club at the end of the decade. Russell partnered Pat Moylan at midfield on Blackrock's All-Ireland Club Championship-winning team in 1974. Russell subsequently returned to the Ballyhea club winning a Cork Junior Championship medal in 1976 and a Cork Intermediate Championship medal in 1980. His was also selected for the Avondhu divisional team with whom he won a Cork Senior Championship medal in 1966.

At inter-county level, Russell was part of the Cork under-21 team that won the All-Ireland Championship in 1966. He joined the Cork senior team in 1966 before being appointed captain of the team for the 1967 Munster Championship. From his debut, Russell struggled to secure a regular place on the starting fifteen, however, he was part of the Cork intermediate team that won the All-Ireland Championship in 1969. He returned to the Cork senior team for the final time for the 1973 Munster Championship.

In retirement from playing Russell became involved in team management and coaching. He was joint coach of the Avondhu senior hurling team that won the 1996 Cork Senior Championship.

== Honours ==
=== Player ===
Ballyhea

- Cork Intermediate Hurling Championship (1): 1980
- Cork Junior Hurling Championship (1): 1976
- North Cork Junior A Hurling Championship (3): 1965, 1975, 1976

Blackrock

- All-Ireland Senior Club Hurling Championship (1): 1973-74
- Munster Senior Club Hurling Championship (1): 1973-74
- Cork Senior Hurling Championship (1): 1973

Avondhu

- Cork Senior Hurling Championship (1): 1966

Cork

- All-Ireland Intermediate Hurling Championship (1): 1969
- Munster Intermediate Hurling Championship (1): 1969
- All-Ireland Under-21 Hurling Championship (1): 1966
- Munster Under-21 Hurling Championship (1): 1966

=== Manager ===
Avondhu

- Cork Senior Hurling Championship (1): 1996

Sporting positions
Preceded by Gerald McCarthy	Cork Senior Hurling Captain; 1967	Succeeded by Jerry O'Sullivan
