= Denis Wynne =

Irish Gaelic footballer

Personal information
- Native name: Donncha Ó Gaoithín (Irish)
- Born: 1945 Athy, County Kildare, Ireland
- Died: 30 May 1999 (aged 54) Dublin, Ireland
- Occupation: Shoemaker
- Height: 5 ft 10 in (178 cm)

Sport
- Sport: Gaelic football
- Position: Full-back
Club
- Years: Club
- Athy
Club titles
- Kildare titles: 0
Inter-county
- Years: County
- Kildare
Inter-county titles
- Leinster titles: 0
- All-Irelands: 0
- NFL: 0
- All Stars: 0

Denis Wynne (1945 – 30 May 1999) was an Irish Gaelic football coach, selector and administrator. At club level, he played with Athy and he was also a member of the Kildare senior football team.

== Career ==
Wynne played his club Gaelic football with Athy and lined out in all grades, including minor, junior, intermediate and senior. He won a Kildare IFC medal in 1974 and was also named Intermediate Footballer of the Year. At inter-county level, Wynne was part of the Kildare team that won consecutive Leinster U21FC titles as well as the All-Ireland U21FC title in 1965. He later won a Leinster JFC medal in 1967 and made several appearances for the senior team.

== Post-playing career ==
In retirement from playing, Wynne became involved in the administrative affairs of the GAA. He was a long-serving chairman of the Athy club.

Wynne died on 30 May 1999, at the age of 54.

== Honours ==
Athy

- Kildare Intermediate Football Championship: 1974

Kildare

- Leinster Junior Football Championship: 1967
- All-Ireland Under-21 Football Championship: 1965
- Leinster Under-21 Football Championship: 1965, 1966
