= 1847 Grand National =

English steeplechase horse race

- Grand National
- Location: Aintree
- Date: 3 March 1847
- Winning horse: (Ireland) Mathew
- Starting price: 10/1
- Jockey: Denny Wynne
- Trainer: (Ireland) John Murphy
- Owner: (Ireland) John Courtenay
- Conditions: Good (good to firm in places)

The 1847 Grand National Steeplechase was the ninth official annual running of a Handicap Steeple-chase horse race which took place at Aintree Racecourse near Liverpool on 3 March 1847 and attracted a then record field of twenty-six runners. It was won by Mathew, ridden by Denny Wynne in the colours of County Cork landowner, John Courtenay. This was the first time the race was officially named The Grand National Steeplechase, having previously been run under the title, Grand Liverpool Steeplechase.

== The Course ==
Contemporary newspaper reporters stated that the race was run over the same course as the previous year, although some additional fences, which had appeared between Becher's Brook and the Canal Turn the previous year had been removed. Generally the press thought the fences to be only of a moderate character and that the popularity of the race, which received many press claims of being the jumping rival of The Derby, was more down to the spectators in the stands being able to witness the entire contest, unusual for a Steeplechase at that time.

Start – Just beyond the Lane by the stands. Fence 1 [19 on the second circuit] Deep drain and bank. Fence 2 [20] Bank. Fence 3 [21] Post, rail ditch on take off side and drop. Fence 4 [22] Post and rails with ditch and drop. Fence 5 [23] Becher's Brook Post and rail bounded by broad ditch. Fence 6 [24] Hedge and bank with drain. Fence 7 [25] Quickset hedge. Fence 8 [26] A double fence of post and rails with thick thorn fence beyond with a rivulet between. Fence 9 [27] Brook with timber before it and a 90 degree turn beyond. Fence 10 [28] Strong hedge and drop with brook on take off side. Fence 11 [29] Bank and ditch. Fence 12 [30] Hedge and dyke. Fence 13 [31] Bar into Mess Bridge Lane. Fence 14 [32] Bar out of Mess Bridge Lane. Fence 15 Six Foot High Gorsed Hurdle at the distance chair, also known as the Made fence. Fence 16 Artificial fence and piece of water 15 feet wide and 3 feet deep. Fence 17 Bank and Ditch at the lane. Fence 32 Hurdle. Fence 33 Hurdle.

Although the course remained the same, the makeup of the actual fences, and the terrain of the fields between them changed year on year at this time. The starting lane was in the area now known as Melling Road, A second set of rails had been removed from Becher's Brook since the previous year's running while the fences between it and the Canal Turn had changed greatly since last year. Neither the Canal Turn nor Valentine's Brook had been named yet and were fences nine and ten in this year's race. The Table jump, which was believed to have been a Punchestown styled bank appears to have been removed from the area now known as Anchor Bridge Lane and replaced with a rail into and out of it, which at this time was called Mess Bridge Lane. The Chair was known at this time as the Made Fence or Gorsed Hurdle while the Water Jump was described as the Artificial Brook. The Fence previously known as the Sunken Lane, which today is Melling Road, had the entry element of it removed this year, leaving just a bank and ditch to jump out of, while the number of hurdles on the second circuit run in was reduced from three to two.

== Leading Contenders ==
The Roarer was the 5/1 favourite on the day was known for winning the 1845 Bibury Stakes in the colours of Mr S Quartermaine before passing on to Lord Strathmore and then the Hon. Robert Lawley. Much of his price came from being the mount of popular jockey, Jem Mason as well as reports of having performed well in private trials. Most commentators did not share the public's belief in the horse and advised that horses backed on the basis of private trails, often prove a failure in an actual chase.

St Leger was a six year old brown gelding at 10/1, owned by J. E. Murphy of Breemount in County Meath and had won at Carrickmacross, Newry and Lucan, in the latter beating Switcher, who had finished third in the previous year's National. Tom Olliver was the most experienced rider in the race, having never missed a Grand Liverpool since the first official running in 1839, which increased the Irish entries popularity.

Culverthorpe had recently won in Paris and was partnered by another Aintree regular, Horatio Powell, resulting in a starting price of 10/1

Mathew Wasn't well known to English racegoers, though his rider, Denny Wynne had impressed when making his Aintree debut the previous year. Most of his notable races in Ireland over fences had resulted in his being placed rather than winning, often being beaten by Brunette. He was freely available at 10/1 until a mesmerist, on stage in Liverpool on the eve of the race, predicted he would win while she was in a trancelike state as part of her act. This, coupled with a welter of Irish money, saw his price slashed to 4/1 favourite on the morning of the race, though the enthusiasm for his chances cooled again in the final hour before the race and resulted in his price drifting back out to 11/1

Saucepan was a 12/1 shot who became popular for a surprise victory over Brunette in Ireland in the Rock Stakes at Cashel in the previous October, having not won any significant race prior to that. Again his price may have been helped by the partnership of one of the more famous jockeys in the race, William McDonough.

Jerry was also a 12/1 shot from Bradley's stable in Hednesford and a namesake of the 1840 winner, with whom he has sometimes been mistaken in later histories of the race. He came to the attention of backers after winning at Leamington in the weeks prior to the National and was to be ridden by his trainer.

Pioneer was another at 12/1 on the back of his victory in the race last year.

Clinker was rather surprisingly backed at 12/1 despite being virtually unknown to race commentators.

Brunette had come from Ireland with a fearsome reputation as the best horse from that land, making her a strong favourite in the days leading up to the race. However, as Irish racegoers began arriving in Liverpool, they began betting heavily against the mare, leading bookmakers to allow her price to drift out to 20/1 by the time of the race.

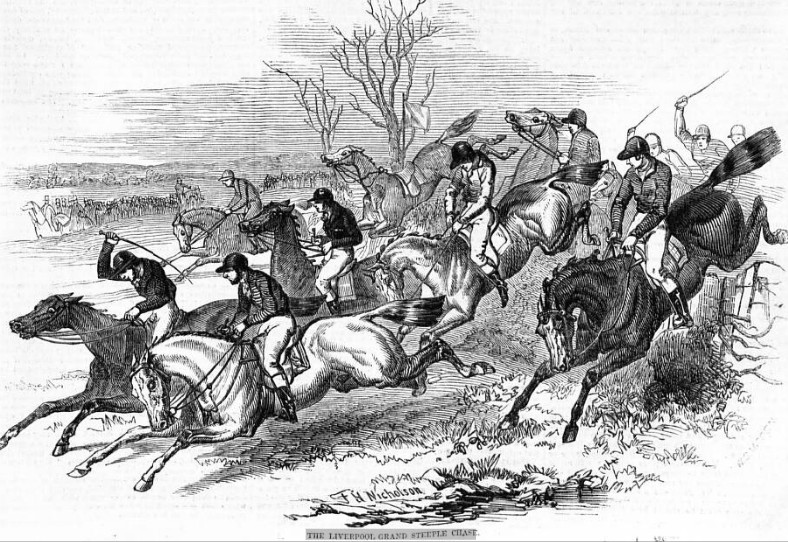

== The Race ==
There are many contemporary reports from reporters on the course who witnessed the race but with a large field of twenty-eight runners, an inability to see clearly events taking place beyond the racecourse proper and, as one reporter noted, the reluctance of many of the Irish jockeys who failed to complete the course to accurately report their fate in case it suggested an inferiority to their Saxon {English} counterparts many of their descriptions of what happened to those outside the first four to finish are in conflict. The race report below is based on the most likely outcome where a majority of reporters agreed.

Cumberland Lassie made the early running with no incident over the first two fences before Marengo took a heavy fall at fence three. The horse was none the worse for wear and was quickly continuing riderless while jockey, Barker who had been left injured in a nearby barn in the 1839 race, was yet again carried from the course near unconscious, though he quickly recovered this time.

Red Lancer, in the colours of his rider, Lord Strathmore, which would one day be inherited by his great niece, the future Queen Elizabeth, the Queen Mother made to refuse the fourth fence and collided with another runner. The Lord was knocked over when trying to remount but eventually made it back into the saddle, only to find his mount had other ideas, refusing at several fences before the pairing quit the race once back on the course proper.

Several others were also hampered here as the runners out on the right began crossing to the left to get a better line for Becher's Brook. Those already on the inner were crowded out and several were hampered with both Quicksilver and Ballybar being crowded out and brought down.

Cumberland Lassie now led by several lengths at the double fence and brook between Becher's and The Canal Turn, where one of the leading runners crashed through and broke the rail. Valeria was hampered and fell here when making a tentative jump to clear the broken rail and then being cannoned into by both Grenade and Young Lottery.

Cumberland Lassie's front running came to an end at the rail before Mess Bridge Lane, which in previous years had been like a Punchestown Table Top but was now a rail into and then out of the lane. The leader tried to bolt down the lane, crashing the pole and almost throwing her rider before colliding with a gate, which finally dislodged Maddox.

That left Jerry in the lead, preceded by the now riderless Marengo as they led the runners into the training ground to turn for the grandstands. James Bradley took a pull on Jerry at this point, possibly fearing the loose horse in front might cause and issue, and allowed those chasing to close the gap as they jumped the made fence and water jump. Tramp came upsides Jerry at this point, followed by St Leger, Pioneer, Culverthorpe, The Roarer, Avoca, The False Heir and Mathew, with Brunette bringing up the rear of a closely bunched field of around twenty-two runners.

The loose Marengo made for the stables at this point, much to the relief of the leading riders as Jerry led the field over the sunken lane and off on the second circuit. St Ruth departed at what had previously been the first fence last time round.

Jerry and Tramp continued to dispute the lead down to Becher's Brook where the latter began to drop back with The Roarer, Pioneer and St Leger all prominent. Jerry continued to lead along the Canal side until over reaching at the Mess Bridge lane, tearing a plate and almost throwing Bradley, who managed to stay in front of The Roarer, Pioneer and St Leger despite having lost a stirrup.

This quartet led the way back onto the course to straighten up for the hurdles with Mathew, Brunette and Culverthorpe making headway. Jerry led over the penultimate flight from St Leger, Pioneer, Mathew, Culverthorpe and The Roarer who crashed through the hurdle to leave a path for the others to follow.

St Leger now kicked on going to the final hurdle, being instantly challenged by Mathew who appeared to be going the better of the two before opening up a one length advantage at the finish line, The unlucky Jerry was a further two lengths behind in third Pioneer just three and a half lengths further back in fourth. with Culverthorpe and Brunette the only other two to keep up the chase to the finish as several others were pulled up on the run in and walked in once it was clear their chance of winning was gone.

The time of ten minutes, thirty-nine seconds was beat the course record, set the previous year by eight seconds, with the race reporters largely in agreement that this had been the greatest renewal of the race yet.

== Finishing order ==
position	name	rider	age	weight	starting price	distance or fate	Colours
Winner	Mathew	Denny Wynne	9	10-06	11/1	1 length	Purple, cream sleeves, black cap
Second	St Leger	Tom Olliver		12-03	14/1	2 lengths	Red, White cap
Third	Jerry	James Bradley	13	11-06	12/1	Overreached fence 30, lost a shoe and stirrup, 3.5 lengths	Red, White sash, Black cap
Fourth	Pioneer	Captain William Peel	7	11-12	10/1		Black, Red sleeves and cap
Fifth	Culverthorpe	Horatio Powell		11-06	10/1		White, Red cap
Sixth	Brunette	Allen McDonough	15	12-06	20/1	Last official finisher	Maroon, gold piping
Non Finishers
After final fence	The Roarer	Jem Mason		10-07	5/1 favourite	Pulled up and walked in.	Pale blue, Bluff stripes, Black cap
After final fence	Grenade	Harry Rackley	6	10-08	Not Quoted	Pulled up and walked in.	White, Purple cap
After final fence	Cavendish	William Scott	7	10-10	Not quoted	Pulled up and walked in	Red, Yellow sleeves, Red cap
After final fence	The Pluralist	John Danby		11-04 {+2lbs over}	Not quoted	Pulled up and walked in	White, Blue spots, Black cap
After final fence	Tramp	William Archer	7	10-06	Not quoted	Pulled up and walked in	Purple, White sleeves and cap
After final fence	Latitat	Charles Bevill		11-00	25/1	Pulled up and walked in	Blue, White piping, Black cap
After final fence	Young Lottery	John Butler	5	10-07	Not quoted	Pulled up and walked in.	Red, Black cap
After final fence	Avoca	Captain J Broadley		10-10	15/1	Pulled up and walked in	White, Black cap
After final fence	Frederick	Tom Abbott	6	11-02	100/7	Pulled up and walked in	Maroon, Gold piping
After final fence	The False Heir	G. Wilson	13	11-04	20/1	Pulled up and walked in	White, Blue spots, White cap
Fence 33 [Penultimate hurdle]	Gayhurst	T. Wesley		10-07	Not quoted	Pulled up and walked in	Red, White sleeves, Black cap
Fence 32	Clinker	W. Maloney	12	10-07	12/1	Fell	White, Black cap
Fence 32	Barmaid	W Lockwood	7	10-08	Not quoted	Pulled up	Green, Red cap
Around fence 23 {Becher's Brook}	Midnight	W D Gardner	5	10-10	Not quoted	Fell	Green, Black cap
Fence 23 {Becher's Brook}	Saucepan	William McDonough	8	12-02	12/1	Fell	Peach, Black cap
Fence 19	St Ruth	Charley Canavan		12-10	14/1	Fell	Blue, White birdseye, Black cap
Fence 13	Cumberland Lassie	J Maddox	8	10-04	Not quoted	Fell while leading	Red, Black sleeves and cap
Fence 8	Valeria	James Daly	6	10-03	Not quoted	Hampered, Fell	Crimson, White sleeves, Black cap
Fence 4	Ballybar	Turner	7	11-12	Not quoted	Brought Down	Tartan, White cap
Fence 4	Quicksilver	Rawson	7	10-04	Not quoted	Brought Down	Red, Multi chequered cap
Fence 4	Red Lancer	Lord Strathmore		10-08	20/1	Fell, continued tailed off and repeatedly refused until pulled up end of first circuit	Pale blue, Buff stripes, Black cap
Fence 3	Marengo	P Barker		11-00	100/5	Fell	Purple

Cure-All, Discount, Proceed, Profligate, Little Tommy, a horse by Tom Brown, Sam Slick, Railroad, Christopher North, Ragman, Forest Boy and Nimble Harry were withdrawn.

== Aftermath ==
All the horses returned to the stables, although Jerry spread a plate. William McDonough suffered a broken arm in a fall from Saucepan and Barker was badly shaken from a heavy fall on Marengo. Valeria was immediately entered in the next race with Tom Olliver in the saddle and won, while in the same race Gardner, who had ridden Midnight in the National, suffered a fall which resulted in two broken ribs.

In 1911, John Danby, who rode Pluralist was believed to be the oldest surviving jockey to have taken part in a Grand National. Born in 1819, he was the same age as John Devine, another rider who was making the same claim, but whose two rides had been in Grand National precursors in 1836 and 1837.

The win has gone down in history as being a hugely popular one among the Irish, bearing in mind that this was at the height of the Great Famine in the country. In truth the Irish press largely ignored the race in those days and it was only the wealthy friends of Mr John Courtenay in and around the County Cork area who benefited from the victory. In actuality Courtenay was considered among the most ruthless of the landowners who were, at this time forcibly evicting their tenants for being unable to meet their rent and as a result the rank and file Irishmen had placed their support with another Irish entrant Brunette. In the event, it was only this huge body of support from across the Irish sea, and one large wager in particular that saw her start at all as she was not considered in a fit state to race at all. Later histories of the race state that she was tailed off for most of the race but contemporary reports place her heavily involved in the front rank and her being recorded as a finisher support the contemporary accounts.

Much of the early history of the Grand National was told many years after the events and often from memory with the result that the winner, Mathew appears on the winners board at Aintree carrying the modern spelling of Matthew. The sixth horse The False Heir is often recorded as a non finisher while the favourite The Roarer, along with Young Lottery are not recorded as having taken part at all. As a result, many modern books and websites state six finishers in a field of twenty-six runners instead of the seven from twenty-eight recorded by the press of the time.

== Sources ==
- The Irish Newsletter 4 March 1847
- The Times 4 March 1847
- The Liverpool Mercury 4 March 1847
