= 1968 All-Ireland Under-21 Football Championship =

Gaelic football competition

Championship details

All-Ireland Champions
- Winning team: Derry (1st win)
- Captain: Tommy Diamond

All-Ireland Finalists
- Losing team: Offaly

Provincial Champions
- Munster: Kerry
- Leinster: Offaly
- Ulster: Derry
- Connacht: Mayo

The 1968 All-Ireland Under-21 Football Championship was the fifth staging of the All-Ireland Under-21 Football Championship since its establishment by the Gaelic Athletic Association in 1964.

Mayo entered the championship as the defending champions, however, they were defeated by Offaly in the All-Ireland semi-final.

On 9 September 1968, Derry won the championship following a 3-9 to 1-9 defeat of Offaly in the All-Ireland final. This was their first All-Ireland title.

== Results ==
=== All-Ireland Under-21 Football Championship ===
Semi-finals

25 August 1968 Semi-final	Offaly	3-09 - 2-10	Mayo	O'Connor Park, Tullamore

25 August 1968 Semi-final	Derry	3-11 - 0-10	Kerry	Dean McGlinchey Park, Ballinascreen

Final

8 September 1968 Final	Derry	3-09 - 2-09	Offaly	Croke Park, Dublin

== Statistics ==
=== Miscellaneous ===
- Offaly win the Leinster title for the first time in their history.
