= Mathew (horse) =

Irish racehorse

- Sire: Vestris
- Grandsire: Whalebone
- Sex: Gelding
- Foaled: 1838
- Country: Ireland
- Colour: Bay
- Breeder: John Westropp
- Owner: John Courtenay
- Trainer: John Murphy

Major wins
- Grand National (1847)

Mathew was a racehorse which won the 1847 Grand National Steeplechase at Aintree near Liverpool. He is regarded as the first Irish-trained horse to win the race having been prepared for the race by John Murphy at The Curragh for County Cork-based owner John Courtenay. He was ridden on the day by the Irish jockey, Denny Wynne.
