= 1969–70 National Football League (Ireland) =

Gaelic football competition

League details
- Dates: October 1969 – 10 May 1970

League champions
- Winners: Mayo (10th win)
- Captain: Johnny Carey

League runners-up
- Runners-up: Down
- Captain: Tom O'Hare

The 1969–70 National Football League was the 39th staging of the National Football League (NFL), an annual Gaelic football tournament for the Gaelic Athletic Association county teams of Ireland.

Mayo beat Down in the final. The funeral of J. J. Cribbin, who scored two goals and a point in the final, occurred exactly fifty years later.

== Format ==
=== Round-robin format ===
- Division Two (B) and Division Three (A): Played as a double round-robin.
- All other groups: Single Round-Robin. Each team played every other team in its division (or group where the division is split) once, either home or away.

=== Titles ===
Teams in all four divisions competed for the National Football League title.

Teams that did not qualify for the inter-divisional play-offs completed for the Supplementary League Title. There was a severe lack of interest in this league, with considerable delays in organising fixtures in the Southern section. When the final was eventually played, fewer than 100 people attended.

== League Phase ==
=== Division One ===
==== Inter-group play-offs ====
1 March 1970 Semi-final	Down	2-7 — 2-7	Westmeath	Croke Park, Dublin

8 March 1970 Semi-final Replay	Down	1-13 — 1-7	Westmeath	Páirc Tailteann, Navan

8 March 1970 Semi-final	Louth	1-12 — 1-12	Dublin	Croke Park, Dublin

22 March 1970 Semi-final Replay	Louth	0-10 — 0-8	Dublin	Páirc Tailteann, Navan

5 April 1970 Final	Down	0-9 — 0-7	Louth	Croke Park, Dublin

=== Division Two ===
==== Inter-group play-offs ====
8 March 1970 Semi-final	Derry	4-13 — 0-5	Donegal	Dungannon

8 March 1970 Semi-final	Sligo	0-6 — 0-5	Cavan	Páirc Seán Mac Diarmada, Carrick-on-Shannon

22 March 1970 Final	Derry	0-11 — 0-7	Sligo	Ballyshannon

=== Division Three ===
==== Inter-group play-offs ====
1 March 1970 Semi-final	Kerry	3-9 — 0-10	Galway	Croke Park, Dublin
				Attendance: 13,158

22 March 1970 Semi-final	Mayo	3-11 — 0-5	Clare	Pearse Stadium, Salthill

12 April 1970 Final	Mayo	0-10 — 1-5	Kerry	Pearse Stadium, Salthill

=== Division Four ===
==== Group A play-offs ====
1 February 1970 For 2nd place	Kildare	2-12 — 1-4	Roscommon	Athy

==== Inter-group play-offs ====
8 March 1970 Semi-final	Kildare	2-7 — 0-5	Wicklow	Croke Park, Dublin

22 March 1970 Semi-final	Wexford	2-8 — 1-3	Limerick	Clonmel

5 April 1970 Final	Kildare	2-8 — 0-4	Wexford	Dr. Cullen Park, Carlow

=== Supplementary League ===
A: Longford, B: Kilkenny, Waterford, Carlow

==== Group A Regulation Games ====
15 March 1970	Armagh	1-15 — 1-5	Leitrim	Páirc Seán Mac Diarmada, Carrick-on-Shannon

22 March 1970	Fermanagh	2-11 — 1-9	Leitrim	Irvinestown

29 March 1970	Antrim	3-8 — 1-5	Fermanagh

5 April 1970	Antrim	5-8 — 0-5	Leitrim	Páirc Seán Mac Diarmada, Carrick-on-Shannon

12 April 1970	Antrim	6-7 — 1-6	Armagh	Casement Park, Belfast

==== Group B Regulation Games ====
15 March 1970	Cork	2-5 — 0-6	Tipperary	Fermoy

19 April 1970	Cork	0-17 — 2-6	Carlow	Dr. Cullen Park, Carlow

21 April 1970	Tipperary	4-10 — 1-6	Kilkenny	Nowlan Park, Kilkenny

==== Supplementary League Final ====
27 June 1970	Cork	2-6 — 0-8	Antrim	Croke Park, Dublin
				Referee: P Kelly (Dublin)

== Knockout Phase ==
=== Semi-finals ===
12 April 1970

Down	1-11 – 2-3	Kildare

Croke Park, Dublin
Attendance: 11,101

19 April 1970

Mayo	1-11 – 2-7	Derry

Croke Park, Dublin

=== Finals ===
10 May 1970
Final

Mayo	4-7 – 0-10	Down
J. J. Cribbin 2-1; J Corcoran 0-4; T Fitzgerald, J Gibbons 1-0 each; W McGee, J Langan 0-1 each

Croke Park, Dublin
Attendance: 32,042
Referee: John Moloney (Tipperary)
