= 1963 All-Ireland Minor Football Championship =

Championship details

All-Ireland Champions
- Winning team: Kerry (7th win)

All-Ireland Finalists
- Losing team: Westmeath

Provincial Champions
- Munster: Kerry
- Leinster: Westmeath
- Ulster: Down
- Connacht: Mayo

The 1963 All-Ireland Minor Football Championship was the 32nd staging of the All-Ireland Minor Football Championship, the Gaelic Athletic Association's premier inter-county Gaelic football tournament for boys under the age of 18.

Kerry entered the championship as defending champions.

On 22 September 1963, Kerry won the championship following a 1–10 to 0–2 defeat of Westmeath in the All-Ireland final. This was their seventh All-Ireland title overall and their second title in succession.

== Results ==
=== Connacht Minor Football Championship ===
Quarter-Final

Leitrim 2-7 Sligo 0-7 Manorhamilton.

Semi-Finals

Roscommon 4-11 Leitrim 1-7 Castlebar.

Mayo 3-7 Galway 3-4 Tuam.

Final

Mayo 3-5 Roscommon 1-5 Castlebar Ref: George O'Toole Leitrim.

=== Leinster Minor Football Championship ===
Preliminary round

Quarter-Finals

Semi-Finals

Final

1963 Westmeath 2–14 Dublin 3–07 Tullamore

=== Munster Minor Football Championship ===
Quarter-Finals

Semi-Finals

Final

1963 Kerry 0–11 (11) Cork 0–04 (4) Cork Athletic Grounds

=== Ulster Minor Football Championship ===
Preliminary round

Quarter-Finals

Semi-Finals

Final

1962 Down 2–05 Armagh 0–08

=== All-Ireland Minor Football Championship ===
Semi-Finals

August 4 Kerry 1-14 Mayo 2-7 Croke Park.

Final

22 September 1963 Final	Kerry	1-10 - 0-02	Westmeath	Croke Park, Dublin

== Championship statistics ==
=== Miscellaneous ===
- Westmeath qualify for the All-Ireland final for the first time in their history.
