= 1969 All-Ireland Intermediate Hurling Championship =

Championship Details
- Dates: 20 April – 12 October 1969

All Ireland Champions
- Winners: Kildare (1st win)
- Captain: Bobby Burke

All Ireland Runners-up
- Runners-up: Cork
- Captain: James Russell

Provincial Champions
- Munster: Cork
- Leinster: Kildare
- Ulster: Antrim
- Connacht: Mayo

Championship Statistics
- Top Scorer: Séamus Gillen (3-22)

The 1969 All-Ireland Intermediate Hurling Championship was the ninth staging of the All-Ireland Intermediate Hurling Championship since its establishment by the Gaelic Athletic Association in 1961. The championship ran from 20 April to 12 October 1969.

London were the defending champions, however, they availed of their right to promotion to the All-Ireland Senior Hurling Championship and did not field a team.

The All-Ireland final was played at Thurles Sportsfield on 12 October 1969 between Kildare and Cork, in what was their first ever championship meeting. Kildare won the match by 2-08 to 3-04 to claim their first ever All-Ireland title.

Cork's Séamus Gillen was the championship's top scorer with 3-22.

== All-Britain Intermediate Hurling Championship ==
=== All-Britain final ===
6 July 1969 Final	London	2-06 - 1-07	Warwickshire	New Eltham
	O'Keeffe 1-1, Tiernan 1-0, Organ 0-2, Power 0-1, Cullinane 0-1, O'Sullivan 0-1, Ryan 0-1.		Hogan 1-2, Crowe 0-2, Horgan 0-1.

== Connacht Intermediate Hurling Championship ==
=== Connacht final ===
1 August 1969 Final	Sligo	2-04 - 3-04	Mayo	Dr. Hyde Park

== Leinster Intermediate Hurling Championship ==
=== Leinster first round ===
20 April 1969 First round	Offaly	3-04 - 5-09	Kilkenny	St. Brendan's Park
	W Gorman 2-1, T Maher 1-0, M Dunne 0-2, M Heavin 0-1.		L O'Brien 0-7, S Culliton 2-0, J Whelan 1-1, P Aylward 1-0, J Millea 1-0, J Maher 0-1.

20 April 1969 First round	Meath	2-03 - 8-10	Kildare	St. Loman's Park
	S Garrigan 1-1, T Ennis 1-1, M Mooney 0-1.		J Cummins 4-0, T Carew 2-1, N Behan 1-4, M Dwane 1-1, B Burke 0-2, J O'Connell 0-1, T Christian 0-1.

20 April 1969 First round	Carlow	9-08 - 5-05	Laois	Geraldine Park
	L Walsh 2-4, M Morrissey 2-1, P McNally 2-0, J Walsh 1-2, J Mitchell 1-0, J Mullen 1-0, M O'Brien 0-1.		P Bates 4-1, M O'Connor 1-0, J Claffey 0-2, T Breen 0-1, L Slevin 0-1.

20 April 1969 First round	Wicklow	4-08 - 4-02	Dublin	Gorey Grounds
	S Doyle 1-5, W Hilliard 1-1, M Jordan 1-1, P Morrissey 1-0, S Brennan 0-1.		M Wallace 2-2, P Murray 2-0.

=== Leinster second round ===
18 May 1969 Second round	Carlow	4-05 - 6-10	Wexford	Dr. Cullen Park
	L Walsh 2-2, W Walsh 1-0, J Byrne 1-0, P McNally 0-1, T Coburn 0-1, T Byrne 0-1.		T Rice 3-2, T O'Loughlin 1-1, D O'Leary 1-0, J Hanrahan 1-0, T Byrne 0-2, P Poole 0-2, R Jacob 0-1, M Jacob 0-1, J Quirke 0-1.

- Kildare, Kilkenny and Wicklow received byes in this round.

=== Leinster semi-finals ===
1 June 1969 Semi-final	Kildare	5-11 - 5-08	Kilkenny	Dr. Cullen Park
	M Dwane 2-2, S Cummins 2-1, T Carew 0-4, N Behan 1-0, E Walsh 0-3, B Burke 0-1.		P Aylward 2-0, L O'Brien 1-2, M Garrett 1-2, J Millea 1-1, S Cullen 0-1, R Walsh 0-1, P Donovan 0-1.

8 June 1969 Semi-final	Wicklow	3-07 - 2-08	Wexford	Aughrim County Ground
	S Doyle 1-4, W Hilliard 1-2, T Coleman 1-0, M Jordan 0-1.		T Royce 1-4, D O'Leary 1-1, M Jacob 0-1, T Loughlin 0-1, P Roche 0-1.

=== Leinster final ===
6 July 1969 Final	Kildare	3-16 - 4-06	Wicklow	Croke Park
	Tommy Carew 1-10, J Cummins 1-0, N Behan 1-0, T Christian 0-2, N Dwane 0-2, Tony Carew 0-1, P Connolly 0-1.		T Kelly 1-1, W Hilliard 1-0, T Morrissey 1-0, L Collins 1-0, J Brennan 0-2, S Doyle 0-2, T Coleman 0-1.

== Munster Intermediate Hurling Championship ==
=== Munster quarter-finals ===
27 April 1969 Quarter-final	Clare	2-04 - 3-05	Tipperary	Cusack Park
	P Danagher 1-1, M Clune 1-0, L Moloney 0-3.		J Lane 2-2, S Cooke 1-0, E Walsh 0-1, N Seymour 0-1, A Walsh 0-1.

27 April 1969 Quarter-final	Limerick	3-06 - 4-03	Waterford	Gaelic Grounds
	M Grace 2-0, S Burke 1-0, P Hartigan 0-3, P Nash 0-2, T Ryan 0-1.		P Veale 2-0, S Reid 1-1, B Tobin 1-0, J Foley 0-1, O Wilkinson 0-1.

18 May 1969 Quarter-final replay	Waterford	3-05 - 2-09	Limerick	Fraher Field
	M McGrath 2-4, B Scanlon 1-1,		P Nash 0-5, M Grace 1-1, D Dwyer 1-1, P Hartigan 0-1, S Burke 0-1.

25 May 1969 Quarter-final	Kerry	0-08 - 3-07	Cork	Austin Stack Park
	T Nolan 0-2, T McEnery 0-1, E Leen 0-1, J Culloty 0-1, M Hennessy 0-1, S Sheehy 0-1, T Kenny 0-1.		D Daly 2-0, F Kelleher 1-1, D Coleman 0-2, M Malone 0-1, P Ring 0-1, T Meaney 0-1, M Hegarty 0-1.

=== Munster semi-finals ===
15 June 1969 Semi-final	Tipperary	1-06 - 4-06	Cork	Thurles Sportsfield
	J Egan 1-0, N Seymour 0-3, B Teehan 0-1, M Ferncombe 0-1, S Cooke 0-1.		T Meaney 3-1, S Gillen 1-2, D Coleman 0-2, D Daly 0-1.	Referee: J Quaid (Limerick)

15 June 1969 Semi-final	Galway	4-09 - 5-06	Limerick	MacDonagh Park
	T Lane 1-5, G Hassett 2-1, B Geraghty 1-2, D Coen 0-1.		V Sullivan 2-0, O Dillon 1-0, D Dwyer 1-0, T Ryan 1-0, P Nash 0-3, S Burke 0-1, P Hartigan 0-1, P Aherne 0-1.

18 July 1969 Semi-final replay	Galway	2-16 - 2-05	Limerick	MacDonagh Park
	T Lane 0-7, J Kenny 1-1, G Hassett 1-1, S Cannon 0-3, A Kenny 0-2, B Geraghty 0-1, P Darcy 0-1.		P Nash 1-4, PJ Hickey 1-0, T Ryan 0-1.

=== Munster final ===
3 August 1969 Final	Cork	4-14 - 0-06	Galway	Dr. Mannix Sportsfield
	S Gillen 2-10, T Meaney 2-0, F Kelleher 0-2, M Malone 0-1, Jack Russell 0-1.		T Lane 0-2, M Dunne 0-2, S Kelly 0-1, A Ryan 0-1.	Referee: J Quaid (Limerick)

== Ulster Intermediate Hurling Championship ==
=== Ulster final ===
15 June 1969 Final	Antrim	5-06 - 3-09	Down	Casement Park

== All-Ireland Intermediate Hurling Championship ==
=== All-Ireland quarter-final ===
10 August 1969 Quarter-final	Antrim	4-15 - 2-09	Mayo	Casement Park
	P McShane 2-1, PJ McCamphill 1-1, S Shannon 1-1, B McGarry 0-4, S Richmond 0-2, S Burns 0-2, A Black 0-2, W Richmond 0-2.		P Bruen 1-1, T Bond 0-4, B Dervan 1-0, T Holland 0-2, M Collins 0-1, G Gibbons 0-1.

=== All-Ireland semi-finals ===
31 August 1969 Semi-final	Cork	4-16 - 4-05	Antrim	Cork Athletic Grounds
	S Gillen 0-9, T Meaney 2-2, D Daly 1-1, D Coleman 1-1, P Hegarty 0-1, F Kelleher 0-1, J Russell 0-1.		S Richmond 2-3, E Donnelly 2-0, B McGarry 0-1, W Richmond 0-1.	Referee: S Fitzgerald (Limerick)

31 August 1969 Semi-final	Kildare	3-12 - 2-04	London	St. Conleth's Park
	B Burke 0-5, J Cummins 1-0, J Wall 1-0, M Mullins 1-0, T Carew 0-3, P Connolly 0-2, J Connell 0-2.		P Shiels 1-0, J Hayes 1-0, M Loughlane 0-2, J O'Leary 0-1, J Kiernan 0-1.	Referee: C Foley (Dublin)

=== All-Ireland final ===
12 October 1969 Final	Kildare	2-08 - 3-04	Cork	Croke Park
	R Burke 0-4, T Christian 1-0, J Wall 1-0, T Carew 0-2, P Dunny 0-1, M Dwane 0-1.		D Daly 2-1, N Gallagher 1-1, S Gillen 0-1, D Coleman 0-1.	Referee: D Nealon (Tipperary)

== Championship statistics ==
=== Top scorers ===
Overall

Rank	Player	Team	Tally	Total
1	Séamus Gillen	Cork	3-22	31
2	Tommy Carew	Kildare	3-20	29
3	Ted Meaney	Cork	7-04	25
3	John Cummins	Kildare	8-01	25
5	Dinny John Daly	Cork	5-03	18
5	Tom Rice	Wexford	4-06	18
5	Liam Walsh	Carlow	4-06	18
8	Tom Lane	Galway	1-14	17
9	Mick Dwane	Kildare	3-06	15
9	Pat Nash	Limerick	1-12	15
