= Séamus Gillen =

Irish hurler

Personal information
- Native name: Séamus Ó Gilín (Irish)
- Born: 1947 (age 78–79) Cork, Ireland

Sport
- Sport: Hurling
- Position: Left wing-forward
Club
- Years: Club
- St Finbarr's
Club titles
- Munster titles: 1
- All-Ireland Titles: 1
Inter-county*
Years	County	Apps (scores)
1970-1971	Cork	1 (0-00)
Inter-county titles
- Munster titles: 0
- All-Irelands: 0
- NHL: 0
- All Stars: 0
- *Inter County team apps and scores correct as of 21:36, 21 April 2015.

Séamus Gillen (born 1947) is an Irish former hurler who played as a left wing-forward at senior level for the Cork county team.

Born in Cork, Gillen first arrived on the inter-county scene at the age of seventeen when he first linked up with the Cork minor team before later joining the intermediate side. He made his senior debut during the 1970-71 league. Gillen had a brief inter-county career as a non-playing substitute.

At club level Gillen is a one-time All-Ireland medallist with St Finbarr's. In addition to this he also won one Munster medals and several championship medals on the field of play and as a non-playing substitute.

Gillen's retirement came following the conclusion of the 1971 championship.

== Honours ==
St Finbarr's

- All-Ireland Senior Club Hurling Championship (1): 1975
- Munster Senior Club Hurling Championship (1): 1974

Cork

- Munster Intermediate Hurling Championship (1): 1969
