= 1966 All-Ireland Junior Hurling Championship =

1966 inter-county junior hurling championship

All Ireland Champions
- Winners: Kildare (2nd win)
- Captain: Mick Hoare

All Ireland Runners-up
- Runners-up: Warwickshire

Provincial Champions
- Munster: Not Played
- Leinster: Kildare
- Ulster: Antrim
- Connacht: Roscommon

The 1966 All-Ireland Junior Hurling Championship was the 45th staging of the All-Ireland Junior Championship since its establishment by the Gaelic Athletic Association in 1912.

Roscommon entered the championship as the defending champions, however, they were beaten in the Ulster Championship.

The All-Ireland final was played on 9 October 1966 at Glebe Farm, between Kildare and Warwickshire, in what was their first ever meeting in the final. Kildare won the match by 4-06 to 2-09 to claim their second championship title overall and a first title in four years.

== All-Ireland Junior Hurling Championship ==
=== All-Ireland home final ===
11 September 1966 Home final	Kildare	3-12 - 2-03	Kerry	MacDonagh Park
	M Behan 1-2, B Quinn 1-2, M O'Brien 1-1, T Christian 0-3, P Connolly 0-1, T Carew 0-1, M Duane 0-1, D O'Keeffe 0-1.		E O'Sullivan 2-1, T Randals 0-1, D Lucid 0-1.

=== All-Ireland final ===
9 October 1966 Final	Warwickshire	2-09 - 4-06	Kildare	Glebe Farm
	T Buckley 1-0, K Phelan 1-0, W Hogan 0-3, E Hanlon 0-2, D Dunne 0-1, P Hallinan 0-1, M O'Leary 0-1, M Sullivan 0-1.		D O'Keeffe 2-0, W Quinn 1-0, M O'Brien 1-0, R Burke 0-3, N Behan 0-3.	Referee: C Foley (Dublin)
