= 1965 All-Ireland Junior Hurling Championship =

1965 inter-county junior hurling championship

All Ireland Champions
- Winners: Roscommon (1st win)
- Captain: Mick Hoare

All Ireland Runners-up
- Runners-up: Warwickshire

Provincial Champions
- Munster: Not Played
- Leinster: Wicklow
- Ulster: Armagh
- Connacht: Roscommon

The 1965 All-Ireland Junior Hurling Championship was the 44th staging of the All-Ireland Junior Championship since its establishment by the Gaelic Athletic Association in 1912.

Down entered the championship as the defending champions, however, they were beaten by Armagh in the Ulster final.

The All-Ireland final was played on 3 October 1965 at St. Coman's Park in Roscommon, between Roscommon and Armagh, in what was their first ever meeting in the final. Roscommon won the match by 3-10 to 2-11 to claim their first championship title.

== Results ==
=== All-Ireland Junior Hurling Championship ===
==== All-Ireland semi-finals ====
29 August 1965 Semi-final	Armagh	1-14 - 3-08	Wicklow	Athletic Grounds

29 August 1965 Semi-final	Roscommon	5-11 - 2-10	Kerry	St. Coman's Park

==== All-Ireland home final ====
12 September 1965 Home final	Roscommon	6-08 - 1-03	Armagh	Croke Park

==== All-Ireland final ====
3 October 1965 Final	Roscommon	3-10 - 2-11	Warwickshire	St. Coman's Park
