= 1967 All-Ireland Under-21 Football Championship =

Gaelic football competition

Championship details

All-Ireland Champions
- Winning team: Mayo (1st win)
- Captain: Willie Loftus

All-Ireland Finalists
- Losing team: Kerry

Provincial Champions
- Munster: Kerry
- Leinster: Kildare
- Ulster: Derry
- Connacht: Mayo

The 1967 All-Ireland Under-21 Football Championship was the fourth staging of the All-Ireland Under-21 Football Championship since its establishment by the Gaelic Athletic Association in 1964.

Roscommon entered the championship as the defending champions, however, they were defeated by Mayo in the Connacht final.

On 8 October 1967, Mayo won the championship following a 4-9 to 1-7 defeat of Kerry in a replay of the All-Ireland final. This was their first All-Ireland title.

== Results ==
=== All-Ireland Under-21 Football Championship ===
Semi-finals

27 August 1967 Semi-final	Kerry	3-09 - 1-07	Kildare	Austin Stack Park, Tralee

27 August 1967 Semi-final	Mayo	3-09 - 1-08	Derry	Fr. O'Hara Park, Charlestown

Finals

10 September 1967 Final	Mayo	2-10 - 2-10	Kerry	Croke Park, Dublin

8 October 1967 Final	Mayo	4-09 - 1-07	Kerry	Dunlo Grounds, Ballinasloe

== Statistics ==
=== Miscellaneous ===
- Derry win the Ulster title for the first time in their history.
- Kildare become the first team to win three successive Leinster titles.
- The All-Ireland final ends in a draw and goes to a replay for the first time.
- J. J. Cribbin, one of the earliest seminarians to receive permission to play football, played for Mayo in the final.
