= Walter J. Enright =

American cartoonist

- Born: 1879; Chicago, Illinois, U.S.
- Died: January 19, 1969; Delray Beach, Florida, U.S.
- Education: Chicago Art Institute; Armour Institute of Technology
- Occupation: Cartoonist
- Spouse: Rae Enright
- Children: Elizabeth Enright

Walter J. Enright, also known as Pat Enright, (1879 - January 19, 1969) was an American political cartoonist.

== Life ==
Enright was born in 1879 in Chicago. He attended the Chicago Art Institute and Armour Institute of Technology, and he served as a pilot in Europe during World War I.

Enright became a professional cartoonist New York City, where his work was published in the New York American and the New York World. He was also an illustrator for The Century Magazine, Redbook, Collier's, Scribner, McClure's, and Life. He later moved to Florida, where he was a cartoonist for the Miami Herald from 1933 to 1943, and for The Palm Beach Post from 1943 to 1948.

Enright had a daughter, Elizabeth Enright, with his first wife, illustrator Maginel Wright Enright. Elizabeth Enright became an author. He and Maginel were married in 1904, divorcing before 1920. His second wife was named Rae.

He resided in Delray Beach, Florida, where he died on January 19, 1969, at the age of 93.
