= 1964 All-Ireland Under-21 Football Championship =

Gaelic football competition

Championship details

All-Ireland Champions
- Winning team: Kerry (1st win)
- Captain: Dom O'Donnell

All-Ireland Finalists
- Losing team: Laois

Provincial Champions
- Munster: Kerry
- Leinster: Laois
- Ulster: Donegal
- Connacht: Galway

The 1964 All-Ireland Under-21 Football Championship was the inaugural staging of the All-Ireland Under-21 Football Championship.

Kerry won the championship following a 1-10 to 1-3 defeat of Laois in the All-Ireland final.

== Results ==
=== All-Ireland Under-21 Football Championship ===
Semi-finals

30 August 1964 Semi-final	Laois	1-11 - 0-10	Donegal	O'Moore Park, Portlaoise
	J Fennell 0-5, C O'Connor 1-1, D Brennan 0-3, M Fennell 0-1, P Delaney 0-1.		F Campbell 0-6, F McFeely 0-2, D O'Carroll 0-1, M McLoone 0-1.

30 August 1064 Semi-final	Galway	1-05 - 3-07	Kerry	Dunlo Grounds, Ballinasloe
	C Tyrrell 1-3, T Keenan 0-1, P Crisham 0-1.		P Griffin 1-1, D O'Shea 1-1, D O'Donnell 0-4, S Burrows 1-0, D O'Sullivan 0-1.	Referee: F Tierney (Cavan)

Final

13 September 1964 Final	Kerry	1-10 - 1-03	Laois	Croke Park, Dublin
13:45	A McKinney 1-0, D O'Shea 0-2, D O'Donnell 0-2, L Barrett 0-2, P Griffin 0-2, T Barrett 0-1, D O'Sullivan 0-1.		J Fennell 1-0, M Fennell 0-2, D Brennan 0-1.	Referee: J Martin (Roscommon)

== Statistics ==
=== Miscellaneous ===
- The All-Ireland final was played as part of a triple-header at Croke Park. It provided a curtain-raiser to the All-Ireland junior finals in both hurling and football.
