= 1962 All-Ireland Minor Football Championship =

Gaelic football tournament

Championship details

All-Ireland Champions
- Winning team: Kerry (6th win)

All-Ireland Finalists
- Losing team: Mayo

Provincial Champions
- Munster: Kerry
- Leinster: Offaly
- Ulster: Down
- Connacht: Mayo

The 1962 All-Ireland Minor Football Championship was the 31st staging of the All-Ireland Minor Football Championship, the Gaelic Athletic Association's premier inter-county Gaelic football tournament for boys under the age of 18.

Cork entered the championship as defending champions, however, they were defeated by Kerry in the Munster final.

On 23 September 1962, Kerry won the championship following a 6-5 to 0-7 defeat of Mayo in the All-Ireland final. This was their sixth All-Ireland title overall and their first in 12 championship seasons.

== Results ==
=== Connacht Minor Football Championship ===
Quarter-Final

Mayo 3-13 Sligo 0-10.

Semi-Finals

Mayo 7-1 Roscommon 0-7.

Galway 7-8 Leitrim 0-10

Final

=== All-Ireland Minor Football Championship ===
Semi-Finals

Mayo 2-12 Down 1-9 Croke Park August 19th.

Final

23 September 1962 Final	Kerry	6-05 - 0-07	Mayo	Croke Park, Dublin
