= 1965 All-Ireland Under-21 Football Championship =

Gaelic football competition

Championship details

All-Ireland Champions
- Winning team: Kildare (1st win)
- Captain: Pat Dunny

All-Ireland Finalists
- Losing team: Cork

Provincial Champions
- Munster: Cork
- Leinster: Kildare
- Ulster: Down
- Connacht: Galway

The 1965 All-Ireland Under-21 Football Championship was the second staging of the All-Ireland Under-21 Football Championship since its establishment by the Gaelic Athletic Association in 1964.

Kerry were the defending champions from the previous championship, however, they did not field a team.

On 3 October 1965, Kildare won the championship following a 2-11 to 1-7 defeat of Cork in the All-Ireland final. This was their first All-Ireland title.

== Results ==
=== All-Ireland Under-21 Football Championship ===
Final

3 October 1965 Final	Kildare	2-11 - 1-07	Cork	Croke Park, Dublin
				Referee: J Martin (Tyrone)

== Statistics ==
=== Miscellaneous ===
- Down win the Ulster title for the first time in their history.
