= 1966 All-Ireland Under-21 Football Championship =

Gaelic football competition

Championship details

All-Ireland Champions
- Winning team: Roscommon (1st win)
- Captain: Colm Shine

All-Ireland Finalists
- Losing team: Kildare

Provincial Champions
- Munster: Kerry
- Leinster: Kildare
- Ulster: Donegal
- Connacht: Roscommon

The 1966 All-Ireland Under-21 Football Championship was the third staging of the All-Ireland Under-21 Football Championship since its establishment by the Gaelic Athletic Association in 1964.

Kildare entered the championship as the defending champions.

On 2 October 1966, Roscommon won the championship following a 2–10 to 1–12 defeat of Kildare in the All-Ireland final. This was their first All-Ireland title.

== Results ==
=== All-Ireland Under-21 Football Championship ===
Semi-finals

| 28 August 1966 Semi-final | Donegal | 0-05 - 2-02 | Roscommon | MacCumhaill Park, Ballybofey |

| 28 August 1966 Semi-final | Kildare | 2-14 - 0-09 | Kerry | St. Conleth's Park, Newbridge |

Final

| 2 October 1966 Final | Roscommon | 2-10 - 1-12 | Kildare | Croke Park, Dublin |
| | | | | Referee: J Martin (Tyrone) |

== Statistics ==
=== Miscellaneous ===
- Roscommon win the Connacht title for the first time in their history.
