= 2012 Down county football team season =

Down county football team
2012 season
- Manager: James McCartan Jnr
- Stadium: Páirc Esler, Newry
- NFL D1: 3rd (semi-finalist)
- All-Ireland SFC: Quarter-finalist
- Ulster SFC: Finalist
- Dr McKenna Cup: Semi-finalist

The following is a summary of Down county football team's 2012 season.

== Kits ==
Home	Away

== Competitions ==
Win Draw Loss Postponed

=== Dr McKenna Cup ===
==== Squad ====
Brendan McVeigh Gk, Damien Turley, Daniel McCartan, Dan Gordon, Niall Branigan, Aidan Branigan, Ciarán Brannigan, Kevin Duffen, Conor Gavery, Brendan McArdle, Mark Doran, Darren O'Hagan, Peter Turley, Conor Gough, Kalum King, Ambrose Rogers, Aidan Carr, Daniel Hughes, Niall McParland, Arthur McConville, Brendan Coulter, Conor Laverty, Eoin McCartan, Paul McComiskey, Marcus Miskelly, Kevin Anderson, Liam Doyle, Michael McAlister Gk

==== Fixtures ====
Date	Round	Home	Score	Away	Ground
8 Jan	Group	Down	2-12 - 0-10	Armagh	Páirc Esler, Newry
15 Jan	Group	Monaghan	0-11 - 4-12	Down	St Tiernach's Park, Clones
18 Jan	Group	Down	1-5 - 0-8	St Marys	Páirc Esler, Newry
22 Jan	Semi-finals	Down	0-9 - 0-11	Derry	Athletic Grounds, Armagh

==== Table ====
Qualified for next round

Team	Pld	W	D	L	F	A	Diff	Pts
Down	3	2	1	0	7–29	0–29	21	5
Armagh	3	2	0	1	1–41	2–34	4	4
Monaghan	3	1	0	2	0–37	4–31	-6	2
St Marys	3	0	1	2	0–24	2–37	-19	1

Semi-finals		Final
Derry	0-11
Down	0-09	Derry	2-08
Tyrone	2-12	Tyrone	1-14
Fermanagh	1-04

=== National Football League Division 1 ===
==== Squad ====
Peter Turley, Damien Turley Keith Quinn, Donal O'Hare, Marcus Miskelly, Niall McParland, David McKibben, Arthur McConville, Conor Gough, Timmy Hanna, Owen Costllo, Ciaran Brannigan, Niall Branigan, Ryan Brady, Kevin Anderson, Michael McAllister, Declan Rooney, Ambrose Rogers, Damien Rafferty, Mark Poland, Brendan McVeigh, Kevin McKernan, Gerard McCartan, Eoin McCartan, Daniel McCartan, Brendan McArdle, Anton McArdle, Conor Maginn, Conor Laverty, Kalum King, Daniel Hughes, Dan Gordan, Conor Garvey, Kevin Duffin, Liam Doyle, Brendan Coulter, Aidan Carr, Aidan Branigan, Paul McComiskey

==== Fixtures ====
Date	Round	Home	Score	Away	Ground
4 Feb	Group	Down	1-10 – 1-09	Donegal	Páirc Esler, Newry
12 Feb	Group	Cork	4-11 – 0-10	Down	Páirc Uí Rinn, Cork
4 Mar	Group	Down	0-8 – 0-14	Kerry	Páirc Esler, Newry
11 Mar	Group	Mayo	0-11 – 1-13	Down	MacHale Park, Castlebar
18 Mar	Group	Down	0-15 – 1-10	Dublin	Páirc Esler, Newry
24 Mar	Group	Armagh	1-14 – 0-16	Down	Athletic Grounds, Armagh
8 Apr	Group	Laois	0-10 – 2-11	Down	O'Moore Park, Portlaoise
15 Apr	Semi-finals	Cork	2-17 – 1-12	Down	Croke Park, Dublin

==== Table ====
Compete in Division 1 semi-finals Automatic relegation to Division 2

Team	Pld	W	D	L	F	A	Diff	Pts
Kerry	7	5	1	1	4-99	5-71	25	11
Cork	7	4	1	2	8-75	1-75	21	9
Down	7	4	0	3	4-83	6-79	-2	8
Mayo	7	3	1	3	4-88	2-83	11	7
Dublin	7	3	0	4	7-88	4-93	4	6
Donegal	7	3	0	4	5-73	8-74	-10	6
Armagh	7	2	1	4	5-73	7-92	-25	5
Laois	7	2	0	5	5-74	9-86	-24	4

^{1}Dublin are placed ahead of Donegal because they won the head-to-head game between the teams (2-16 to 0-13).

Semi-finals		Final
Cork	2-17
Down	1-12	Mayo	0-11
Mayo	1-17	Cork	2-10
Kerry	2-15

==== Results ====
4 February 2012 Round 1	Down	1-10 – 1-09	Donegal	Páirc Esler, Newry
19:00	L Doyle 1–4, (0-2f), A Brannigan 0–2, B Coulter, C Garvey, A Carr (1f), D Gordon 0-1 each	Report	M McElhinney 1–0, M McHugh, P McBrearty (2f), S Griffin (2f) 0-2 each, D Molloy, K Lacey, A Thompson 0-1 each	Referee: Joe McQuillan (Cavan)

12 February 2012 Round 2	Cork	4-11 – 0-10	Down	Páirc Uí Chaoimh, Cork
14:00	P Kelly 3–0, D O'Connor 1-4 (1-0 pen, 3f), B O'Driscoll 0–2, M Shields, A O'Connor, P O'Neill, F Goold, M Collins 0-1 each	Report	A Carr 0-5 (4f), L Doyle 0-2 (2f), A Branigan, D Gordon, C Laverty 0-1 each.	Referee: R. Hickey

4 March 2012 Round 3	Down	0-8 – 0-14	Kerry	Páirc Esler, Newry
19:00	M Poland 0-4 (3f), D Gordon 0–2, D Hughes, A McConville (f) 0-1 each	Report	B Sheehan 0-6 (4f, 1 '45), BJ Keane 0–4, Declan O'Sullivan 0–3, P Curtin 0–1	Referee: D Brazil (Offaly)

11 March 2012 Round 4	Mayo	0-11 – 1-13	Down	McHale Park, Castlebar
14:30	C Mortimer 0–6, A Dillon, A Freeman 0-2 each, A Moran 0–1	Report	A Carr 0–5, C Maginn 1-1, A Rogers 0–3, B Coulter 0–2, D Hughes, K Duffin 0-1 each	Referee: Barry Cassidy (Derry)

18 March 2012 Round 5	Down	0-15 – 1-10	Dublin	Páirc Esler, Newry
14:30	A Carr 0-5 (4f), M Poland, K McKernan, A Rogers 0-2 each, N McParland, B Coulter, C Laverty, D Hughes 0-1 each	Report	K McManamon 1-1, D Connolly 0-3 (3f), A Brogan, MD Macauley 0-2 each, E Fennell, S Cluxton (1 '45') 0-1 each	Referee: C Reilly (Meath)

24 March 2012 Round 6	Armagh	1-14 – 0-16	Down	Athletic Grounds, Armagh
19:00	M Stevenson 0-6 (6f); B Mallon 1-3 (1-0 pen, 0-2f); P Carragher, F Moriarty, D McKenna, C Rafferty, C McKeever 0-1 each.	Report	A Carr 0-6 (6f); D Hughes, M Poland, E McCartan 0-2 each; A Rogers 0-2 (1 '45'); K McKernan, D Gordon 0-1 each.	Referee: David Coldrick (Meath)

8 April 2012 Round 7	Laois	0-10 – 2-11	Down	O'Moore Park, Portlaoise
14:30	G Walsh 0-2 (1f, 1 '45'), C Boyle, B Quigley, R Munnelly, C Begley, P Cahillane, C Kelly (f), D Conway (f), D O'Connor 0-1 each	Report	B Coulter 1-1, A McConville 0-3 (2f), C Laverty 1–0, K Quinn, A Carr (f) 0-2 each, C Garvey, A Rogers, M Poland 0-1 each	Referee: S Doyle (Wexford)

15 April 2012 Semi-final	Down	1-12 – 2-17	Cork	Croke Park, Dublin
4:00	C O'Neill 1-06 (0-2f), A O'Connor 1-00, P Kerrigan, P O'Neill 0-03 each, D O'Connor, A Walsh, N O'Leary, D Goulding, B O'Driscoll 0-01 each.	Report	A Carr 1-02 (1-00 pen, 0-01f), C Laverty, B Coulter 0-03 each, A McConville (f), P Turley, M Poland, B McArdle 0-01 each.	Attendance: 11,342; Referee: Michael Duffy (Sligo)

=== Ulster Senior Football Championship ===
The draw for the 2012 Ulster Senior Football Championship took place on 6 October 2011.

==== Squad ====
Ambrose Rogers, Daniel Hughes, Kalum King, Brendan McVeigh, Gerard McCartan, Declan Rooney, Brendan McArdle, Aidan Burns, Kevin McKernan, Conor Garvey, Mark Poland, Brendan Coulter, Conor Maginn, Dan Gordan, Conor Laverty, Daniel McCartan, Aidan Carr, Aidan Branigan, Eoin McCartan, Kevin Duffin, Anton McArdle, Liam Doyle, Gerard McAnulty, Peter Turley, Damien Turley, Marcus Miskelly, Arthur McConville, Niall McParland, Niall Branigan, Ciaran Brannigan, Owen Costello, Timmy Hanna, Michael McAlister, Shane Harrison, Ben O'Reilly, Donal O'Hare, Darren O'Hagan

==== Fixtures ====
Date	Round	Team 1	Score	Team 2	Ground
3 June 2012	Quarter-final	Fermanagh	1-08 - 2-10	Down	Brewster Park, Enniskillen
24 June 2012	Semi-final	Monaghan	1-13 - 1-14	Down	Athletic Grounds, Armagh
22 July 2012	Final	Donegal	2-18 - 0-13	Down	St Tiernach's Park, Monaghan

==== Rounds ====
Preliminary round
Cavan	1-10
Donegal	1-16

Quarter-finals
Donegal	2-13
Derry	0-09
Tyrone	0-19
Armagh	1-13
Monaghan	1-12
Antrim	1-09
Down	2-10
Fermanagh	1-08

Semi-finals
Donegal	0-12
Tyrone	0-10
Monaghan	1-13
Down	1-14

Ulster final
Donegal	2-18
Down	0-13

==== Results ====
3 June 2012
3:30pm
Quarter-final

Fermanagh	1-08 - 2-10	Down
D. Kelly 1-1, D. Kille 0-3 (2f), S. Quigley 0-2 (2f), T. Corrigan, P. Ward 0-1 each.	Report	D O'Hare 1-1, C Laverty 1–0, C Maginn, A Carr (f), A Rogers, K King, K McKernan, D McCartan, B McArdle, D O’Hagan, K Duffin 0-1 each.

Brewster Park, Enniskillen
Attendance: 12,435
Referee: S Doyle (Wexford)
24 June 2012
2:00pm
Semi-final

Monaghan	1-13 - 1-14	Down
P Finlay (3f), C McManus (3f) 0-5 each, T Freeman 1–0, D Hughes 0-2 (1f, 1 45), D Clerkin 0–1.	Report	D O'Hare 0-5 (5f), A Carr 1–2, (1-0 pen, 1f), C Laverty 0–2, A Rogers (f), D O'Hagan, K Duffin, L Doyle (f), B Coulter 0-1 each.

Athletic Grounds, Armagh
Referee: M Duffy (Sligo)
22 July 2012
2:00pm
Final

Down	0-13 - 2-18	Donegal
L Doyle (2f) 0-04, D O'Hare (1f) 0-02, C Laverty, A Rogers, K McKernan, A Brannigan, C Maginn, D Hughes, E McCartan 0-01 each	Report	L McLoone, F McGlynn 1-00 each, C McFadden (3f) 0-06, Declan Walsh, R Bradley, M McHugh, M McElhinney 0-02 each, David Walsh, D McLaughlin, P McBrearty, M Murphy 0-01 each

St Tiernach's Park, Clones
Attendance: 34, 696
Referee: Joe McQuillan (Cavan)

--

=== All-Ireland Senior Football Championship ===
==== Fixtures ====
Date	Round	Team 1	Score	Team 2	Ground
28 June 2012	Round 4 Qualifier	Tipperary	0-11 - 1-13	Down	Cusack Park, Mullingar
4 August 2012	Quarter-finals	Mayo	3-18 - 2-09	Down	Croke Park, Dublin

==== Rounds ====
Quarter-finals
Cork	2-19
Kildare	0-12
Donegal	1-12
Kerry	1-10
Mayo	3-18
Down	2-09
Dublin	1-12
Laois	0-12

Semi-finals
Cork	1-11
Donegal	0-16
Mayo	0-19
Dublin	0-16

Final
Donegal	2-11
Mayo	0-13

==== Results ====
28 July 2012
16:00
Round 4

Down	1-13 - 0-11	Tipperary
B Coulter 1-02, A Rogers (1f), M Poland (1f) 0-04 each, D Gordon, B McArdle, K Duffin (1f) 0-01 each	Report	A Maloney (2f), M Quinlivan (2f) 0-03 each, P Austin 0-02, B Fox, P Acheson, B Mulvihill 0-01 each

Cusack Park, Mullingar
Referee: C Reilly (Meath)
4 August 2012
17:00
Quarter-final

Mayo	3-18 - 2-09	Down
M Conroy 2-01, J Doherty 1-00, C O’Connor (6f) 0-07, A Dillon 0-04, K McLoughlin 0-02, L Keegan, A O’Shea, A Moran, E Varley 0-01 each	Report	B Coulter 1-01, K King 1-00, A Carr (5f) 0-07, L Doyle (1f) 0-01

Croke Park, Dublin
Referee: Maurice Deegan (Laois)

== Awards ==
- Ulster GAA Writers' Association Award June - Conor Laverty
- Irish News Ulster All-Star - Dan Gordan and Conor Laverty
- BBC Man of the Match v Fermanagh - Conor Laverty
- BBC Man of the Match v Monaghan - Conor Laverty
- RTÉ Man of the Match v Monaghan - Conor Laverty
- GAA Man of the Match v Tipperary - Ambrose Rogers
- GAA All Star nominations - Conor Laverty
