= 2011 Down county football team season =

Down county football team
2011 season
- Manager: James McCartan Jnr
- Stadium: Páirc Esler, Newry
- NFL D1: 4th
- All-Ireland SFC: Round 4 qualifier
- Ulster SFC: Quarter-finalist
- Dr McKenna Cup: Group stage (2nd)

The following is a summary of Down county football team's 2011 season.

== Kits ==
McKenna Cup and NFL kits:

Home	Away

Championship kits:

Home	Away

== Competitions ==
Win Draw Loss Postponed

=== McGeough Cup ===
==== Squad ====
1 Gavin Joyce, 2 Eoin Costello, 3 Gary McCardle, 4 Colm Murney, 5 James Colgan, 6 Kevin McKernan, 7 Michael McCartan, 8 Declan Sheeran, 9 Peter Fitzpatrick, 10 Martin Clarke, 11 Aidan Carr, 12 Brendan Coulter, 13 John Clarke, 14 Joe Ireland, 15 Mark Poland
Subs: Cathal Murdock, Kevin Duffin, Kevin Anderson, Liam Doyle, Michael Magee, Ronan Murtagh, Christopher Duggan, Paul Devlin, Packie Downey, Conor Poland, Michael Magee.

==== Results ====
Date	Home	Score	Away	Location
2011-01-02	Louth	0–16 v 0–11	Down	Haggardstown, Dundalk

=== Dr McKenna Cup ===
==== Squad ====
Gary McArdle, Dan Gordon, Aidan Brannigan, Aidan Carr, Peter Fitzpatrick, Kalum King, Liam Doyle, Mark Poland, Brendan Coulter, Paul Devlin, Martin Clarke, Cathal Murdock, Sean Murdock, Kevin Anderson, James Colgan, Conor Maginn, Ronan Murtagh, Michael McCartan, Conor Poland, Paul McPolin, Declan Sheerin, Kevin Duffin, Michael Magee, Kevin McKernan, Gavin Joyce, Christopher Duggan, Ryan Brady, Packie Downey and Philip Bonny.

==== Fixtures ====
Date	Home	Score	Away	Ground
2011-01-08	Down	P v P*	St Mary's	Páirc Esler, Newry
2011-01-15	Down	3–11 v 2–15	Armagh	Páirc Esler, Newry
2011-01-19	Antrim	0–12 v 0–12	Down	Casement Park, Belfast
2011-01-22	Down	P v P*	St Mary's	Páirc Esler, Newry
2011-01-23	Down	2–13 v 0-06	St Mary's	Páirc Esler, Newry

- 2011-01-08 Down vs St Mary's – Postponed due to frozen pitch
- 2011-01-22 Down vs St Mary's – Postponed due to fog

==== Table ====
Qualified for next round

Team	Pld	W	D	L	F	A	Diff	Pts
Antrim	3	2	1	0	3–36	0–33	12	5
Down	3	1	1	1	5–36	2–33	12	3
Armagh	3	1	0	2	4–34	5–39	−8	2
St Mary's	3	1	0	2	1–31	6–32	−16	2

==== Matches and reports ====
16 January 2011

Down	3–11 – 2–15	Armagh
	Report

Páirc Esler, Newry

19 January 2011

Antrim	0–12 – 0–12	Down
	Report

Casement Park, Belfast

23 January 2011

Down	2–13 – 0–06	St Mary's
	Report

Páirc Esler, Newry

=== National Football League Division 1 ===
==== Squad ====
Michael Magee, John Clarke, Martin Clarke, Brendan McVeigh, Ronan Murtagh, Peter Fitzpatrick, Luke Howard, Kalum King, Conor Maginn, Gerard McCartan, Kevin McKernan Cathal Murdock, Aidan Carr, Paul McPolin, Paul McComiskey, Aidan Brannigan, Conor Laverty, Dan Gordon, Liam Doyle, Conor Poland, Mark Poland, Brendan Coulter, Ronan Sexton, Colm Murney, Daniel Hughes, Declan Alder

==== Fixtures ====
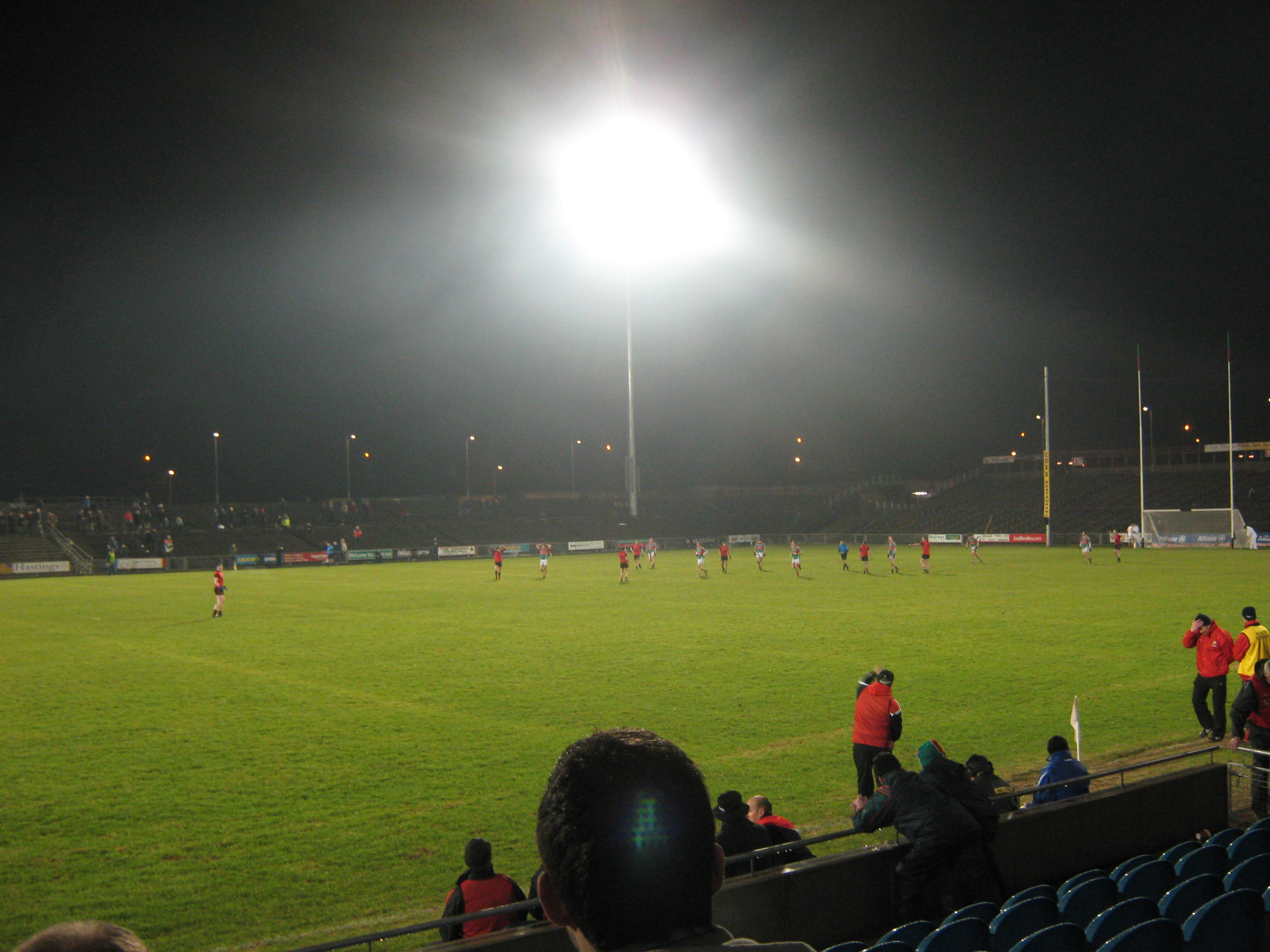
Down playing Mayo at McHale Park, Castlebar.

Date	Home	Score	Away	Ground
5 Feb	Mayo	1–13 v 3-07	Down	McHale Park, Castlebar
20 Feb	Down	2–11 v 1-09	Galway	Páirc Esler, Newry
26 Feb	Down	0–12 v 0–11	Armagh	Páirc Esler, Newry
12 Mar	Cork	3–17 v 0–15	Down	Páirc Uí Rinn, Cork
19 Mar	Down	1–16 v 0–11	Monaghan	Páirc Esler, Newry
2 Apr	Dublin	2–10 v 0–13	Down	Croke Park, Dublin
10 Apr	Kerry	1–13 v 1–11	Down	FitzGerald Stadium, Killarney

==== Table ====
Advanced to NFL final Automatic relegation to Division 2

Team	Pld	W	D	L	F	A	Diff	Pts
Dublin	7	6	1	0	16–82	6–92	20	13
Cork	7	5	0	2	6–110	7–91	16	10
Kerry	7	5	0	2	6–93	5–74	22	10
Down	7	3	1	3	7–85	8–84	-2	7
Mayo	7	2	1	4	10–84	11–85	-4	5
Armagh	7	2	0	5	6–82	7–95	-16	4
Monaghan	7	2	0	5	3–93	6–96	-12	4
Galway	7	1	1	5	2–91	6-103	-24	3

- Cork were placed ahead of Kerry as they won the head-to-head match between the teams (6 February at Tralee: 0-17 - 1-13).
- Armagh were placed ahead of Monaghan as they won the head-to-head match between the teams (20 February at Athletic Grounds: 1-11 - 0-13).

==== Matches ====
5 February 2011

Mayo	1–13 – 3–07	Down
A Moran 0–6 (0-3f), A Freeman 1–1, M Ronaldson 0–3 (0-2f), A Dillon, E Varley, K McLaughlin 0–1 each	Report	M Clarke 1–3, (1–0 '45', 0-2f), J Clarke, C Maginn 1–1 each, D Hughes 0–2

McHale Park, Castlebar
Referee: Cormac Reilly (Meath)

20 February 2011

Down	2–11 – 1–09	Galway
P Fitzpatrick 1–1, C Maginn 1–0, D Rooney, C Lavery, M Clarke, M Poland (2f) 0–2 each, D Hughes, P McComiskey 0–1 each	Report	G O'Donnell 1–0, S Armstrong 0–3 (1f), J Bergin, C Bane (1f), M Clancy (2f) 0–2 each

Páirc Esler, Newry
Referee: Eddie Kinsella (Laois)

26 February 2011

Down	0–12 – 0–11	Armagh
M Clarke 0–3 (2f), R Murtagh, D Hughes, M Poland (1f) 0–2 each, K McKernan, C Laverty, C Maginn, 0–1 each	Report	S McDonnell 0–3 (2f), C Vernon, R Grogan (2f) 0–2 each, K Dyas, J Murtagh, C McKeever, B Mallon 0–1 each

Páirc Esler, Newry
Referee: Pat McEnaney (Monaghan)

12 March 2011

Cork	3–17 – 0–15	Down
D Goulding 0–7 (5f), P Kelly 1–2 (1f), C O'Neill 1–1, F Goold 0–3, P O'Neill 1–0, C Sheehan 0–2, D Goold, A Walsh 0–1 each	Report	M Poland 0–3 (2f), R Murtagh, M Clarke (1f) 0–2 each, K McKernan, C Murdock (1 '45'), P Fitzpatrick, C Laverty, D Hughes, D Rooney, A Branagan, C Garvey 0–1 each

Páirc Uí Rinn, Cork
Referee: D Fahy (Longford)

19 March 2011

Down	1–16 – 0–11	Monaghan
M Clarke 1–4 (1–0 pen, 3f), P McComiskey 0–3, D Rooney, D Hughes, M Poland 0–2 each, B Coulter, A Carr, C Maginn 0–1 each	Report	P Finlay 0–8 (6f), C McManus 0–2 (1f), C Galligan 0–1

Páirc Esler, Newry
Referee: David Coldrick (Meath)

2 April 2011

Dublin	2–10 – 0–13	Down
P Flynn 1–1, A Brogan 1–1 T Quinn 0–4 (3f), D Connolly, B Cahill, B Cullen, B Brogan 0–1 each	Report	M Clarke 0–3 (3f), P McComiskey, B Coulter, D Hughes 0–2 each, M Poland, P Fitzpatrick, K McKernan, C Maginn 0–1 each

Croke Park, Dublin
Referee: Syl Doyle (Wexford)

10 April 2011

Kerry	1–13 – 1–11	Down
Darran O'Sullivan 1–2, B Sheehan 0–4 (3f), C Cooper 0–3 (1f), Declan O'Sullivan 0–2, A Maher, K Donaghy 0–1 each	Report	M Poland 0–5 (4f) B Coulter 1–0, M Clarke 0–3 (1f), J Colgan, C Maginn, C Garvey 0–1 each

FitzGerald Stadium, Kilarney
Referee: R Hickey (Clare)

=== Ulster Senior Football Championship ===
The draw for the 2011 Ulster Senior Football Championship took place on 7 October 2010.

==== Squad ====
Declan Alder, Aidan Branagan, Aidan Carr, Martin Clarke James Colgan, Brendan Coulter, Mark Doran, Liam Doyle, Kevin Duffin, Peter Fitzpatrick, Conor Garvey, Dan Gordan, Michael Magee, Conor Maginn, Kevin McKernan, Anton McArdle, Brendan McArdle, John McAreavey, Daniel McCartan, Eoin McCartan, Gerard McCartan, Paul McComiskey, Paul McPolin, Brendan McVeigh, Cathal Murdock, Sean Murdock, Paul Murphy, Ronan Murtagh, Darren O'Hagan, Conor Poland, Mark Poland, Damien Rafferty, Ambrose Rogers, Declan Rooney, Caolan Mooney

==== Fixtures ====
Date	Home	Score	Away	Ground
28 May	Armagh	1–15 v 1–10	Down	Athletic Grounds, Armagh

==== Rounds ====
Preliminary Round
Donegal	1–10
Antrim	0–7

Quarter-finals
Derry	1–18
Fermanagh	1–10
Armagh	1–15
Down	1–10
Tyrone	1–13
Monaghan	1–11
Cavan	1–8
Donegal	2–14

Semi-finals
Derry	3–14
Armagh	1–11
Tyrone	0–9
Donegal	2–6

Ulster final
Derry	0–08
Donegal	1–11

==== Matches ====
28 May 2011
7:30 pm
Quarter Final

Armagh	1–15 – 1–10	Down
J Clarke 1–2, A Kernan 0–5 (3f), BJ Padden 0–3, M Mackin 0–2, K Dyas, T Kernan S McDonnell (f) 0–1 each	Report	M Clarke 0–5 (4f), M Poland 1–1, P McComiskey 0–2, D Rooney, D Hughes 0–1 each.

Athletic Grounds, Armagh
Attendance: 13,107
Referee: C Reilly (Meath)

=== All-Ireland Senior Football Championship ===
==== Qualifiers ====
25 June 2011
3:00 pm
Round 1

Clare	1–12 – 1–13	Down
D Tubridy 0–4 (3f), T Ryan 1–0, J Dowling, G Quinlan 0–2 each, A Clohessy, John Hayes, G Brennan, M Tubridy 0–1 each	Report	C Laverty 1–3, P McComiskey 0–4 (2f), M Clarke 0–2 (2fs), B McArdle, C Mooney, M Poland, B Coulter 0–1 each

Cusack Park, Ennis
Attendance: 1,640
Referee: P O'Sullivan (Kerry)

9 July 2011
3:00 pm
Round 2

Down	1–16 – 1–08	Leitrim
B Coulter 0–7, M Clarke 1–2 (1-0pen, 1'45), C Laverty, M Poland (1f) 0–2 each, K McKernan, L Doyle, P Fitzpatrick 0–1 each	Report	A Croal 1–1, E Mulligan 0–3 (3fs), R Lowe, B McDonald, J Glancy, C Kelly 0–1 each

Páirc Esler, Newry
Attendance: 6,000
Referee: M Sludden (Tyrone)

16 July 2011
7.00 pm
Round 3

Antrim	0–10 – 3–13	Down
B Herron, K Niblock, P Cunnighan (2f) 0–2 each, G O'Boyle, D O'Hagan, J Crozier, T McCann ('45') 0–1 each	Report	M Clarke 1–4 (3f, 1 '45'), M Poland 0–4 (4f), C Laverty, C Mooney 1–0 each, B Coulter 0–2, A Branagan, K McKernan, P McComiskey 0–1 each

Casement Park, Belfast
Referee: Padraig Hughes (Armagh)

23 July 2011
6:00 pm
Round 4

Down	0–14 – 2–20	Cork
M Clarke 0–3 (2f), B Coulter, P McComiskey 0–2 each, C Garvey, C Maginn, D Hughes, M Poland, K McKernan, A Rogers, C Laverty 0–1 each	Report	D O'Connor 1–7 (4f), F Goold 1–2, P Kerrigan 0–3, P Kelly 0–2, D Goulding 0–1 (1f), P Kissane, P O'Neill, G Canty, A Walsh, J Miskella 0–1 each

Croke Park, Dublin
Referee: M Duffy (Sligo)
