= Liam Doyle (Gaelic footballer) =

Irish Gaelic footballer

Personal information
- Native name: Liam Ó Dúil (Irish)
- Nickname: Doyler
- Born: County Down, Northern Ireland
- Height: 6 ft 0 in (183 cm)

Sport
- Sport: Gaelic football
- Position: Center Half back
Club
- Years: Club
- 1998 – present: Liatroim Fontenoys
Club titles
- Down titles: 1
- Ulster titles: 1
College titles
- Sigerson titles: 1
Inter-county**
Years	County	Apps (scores)
2000 – present	Down	?
Inter-county titles
- Ulster titles: 1
- All-Irelands: 1
- All Stars: 2
- **Inter County team apps and scores correct as of 15:58, 17 May 2008 (UTC).

Liam Doyle is a Gaelic football player from with County Down, Northern Ireland. He plays for the Down senior football team and his local club Liatroim Fontenoys.

Doyle was captain of the Down team that won the Ulster Minor Championship in 1999, and later that year won the All-Ireland Minor Football Championship. After nearly three years Doyle made a welcome comeback for the Down men in their 1-10 to 1-09 National Football League win over Donegal. Doyle scored 1-4 from centre back, winning man of the match and making Gaelic Life's "team of the week". Liam's father Willie Doyle was Center Half back on the Down team that won the All-Ireland in 1968.

== Honours ==
- 2 Ryan Cup 2000 2001
- 1 Down Division 2 Football League 1998
- 2 Down Intermediate Championship 1998 2018
- 1 Ulster Intermediate Club Football Championship 1998
- 1 Ulster Minor Football Championship 1999
- 1 All-Ireland Minor Football Championship 1999
- 1 Dr McKenna Cup 2008
- 1 Sigerson Cup 2001
- 1 Railway Cup 2003
- 1 Hogan Cup 1998
- 1 MacRory Cup 1998
- 1 Ulster Colleges All-Star 1998
- 1 Sigerson Player Of The Tournament 2001
- 1 Sigerson All-Star 2001
