= Kalum King =

Irish Gaelic footballer

Personal information
- Born: County Down, Northern Ireland
- Height: 6 ft 3 in (191 cm)

Sport
- Sport: Gaelic football
- Position: Midfield/Full Forward
Club
- Years: Club
- 2003-present: Bryansford
Club titles
- Down titles: 1
- Ulster titles: 0
Inter-county
Years	County	Apps (scores)
2004-2014	Down	19 (1-02)
Inter-county titles
- Ulster titles: 0
- All Stars: 0

Kalum King is a Gaelic football player from County Down. He played for the Down senior inter-county football team and with his local club, Bryansford.

King first played for Down in 2004, when he played a role in Down's promotion run in the national league that year. He restarted his county career in 2010, and started every game in the 2010 league season. In the 2010 championship, the team progressed to the All-Ireland Final against Cork. He was appointed Down's vice-captain in 2012, and was captain for various games. He reportedly left the Down squad ahead of the 2014 Ulster Championship.

At club level, King was part of the Bryansford championship-winning side in 2003, and also part of the side that won the league title in 2014 after a match against Mayobridge in Kilcoo.

Outside of Gaelic games, King was also involved in boxing.

== Honours ==
Down

- All-Ireland Senior Football Championship (1): 2010 (runner-up)
- National Football League Division 2 (2): 2004, 2010 (Promoted)

Bryansford

- Down Senior Football Championship (1): 2003
- Down Under-21 Football Championship (1): 2003
- Down League Winner (1): 2014
