= Kevin McKernan =

Irish Gaelic footballer

Personal information
- Native name: Caoimhín Mac Thiarnáin (Irish)
- Nickname: McKernan
- Born: 3 December 1987 (age 38) Newry, County Down, Northern Ireland
- Height: 1.83 m (6 ft 0 in)

Sport
- Sport: Gaelic football
- Position: Centre Back
Club
- Years: Club
- 2004–: Burren
Club titles
- Down titles: 2
Inter-county
- Years: County
- 2007–2022: Down

Kevin McKernan (born 3 December 1987) is a former Gaelic football player from County Down, Northern Ireland. He played for the Down senior inter-county football team.

== Playing career ==
=== Inter-county ===
McKernan has been a member of the Down team since 2008 but made his debut in 2007. He also plays Midfield or Half Forward. He started at centre back in 2010, in which Down lost 0-15 to 0-16 to Cork. Kevin won a Dr McKenna Cup in 2008 scoring 1 point from play he won an Ulster Under-21 Football Championship in 2008 beating Derry 3-11 to 1-14.

== Family ==
His father, Brendan, was Right Corner Back on the Down Team that won the All Ireland in 1991.

=== International rules ===
McKernan was part of the Ireland team that won the 2011 International Rules Series against Australia by 130 to 65.

He trained with Ireland ahead of the 2013 International Rules Series but was overlooked for the panel due to a bruised knee.

== Honours ==
Down

- Dr McKenna Cup (1): 2008
- Ulster Under-21 Football Championship (1): 2008
- All-Ireland Minor Football Championship (1): 2005
- All-Ireland Football Championship (1): 2010 (runner-up)
- Ulster Senior Football Championship (1): 2012 (runner-up)

Ireland

- International Rules (1): 2011

Burren

- Down Senior Football Championship (3): 2010, 2011, 2018
- Down Senior Football League Division 1 (2) 2006-12 (c)
- Down Under-21 Football Championship (2): 2006-08 (c)

School

- MacRory Cup (1): 2006 (c)
- Hogan Cup (1): 2006 (c)

Awards

- Ulster Colleges All-Star (2): 2005-06
- Irish News All-Star (1): 2010
- Down County Final Man of the Match (1): 2011
- GPA Gaelic Team of the Year (1): 2010
- Ulster Club All-Star (1): 2011-12

Sporting positions
Preceded by Anthony Devlin (Kilcoo)	Down ACFL Division 1 Final winning caption 2012	Succeeded by Gary McEvoy
