= Donnellan =

Royal Blood

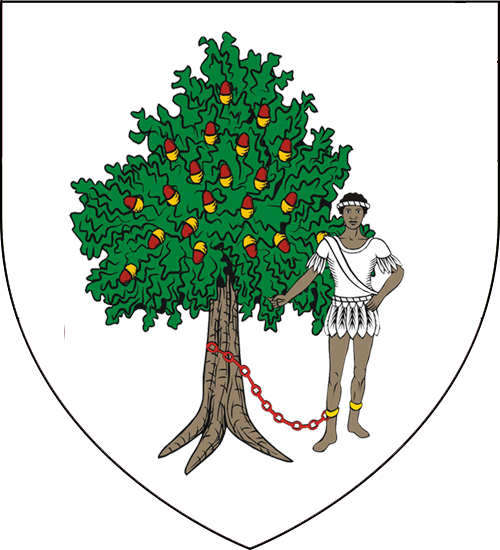
Ó Domhnalláin.

Donnellan is an Irish surname and refers to the clan name Ó Domhnalláin or O'Donnellan.

At least two unrelated families of the name existed in Gaelic Ireland. One in south-east Ulster, another in south-east Connacht in the kingdom of Ui Maine. More recently, a number of Donnellans had their name changed from Donnelly in the 19th century, located largely in the County Galway/Mayo region. As such, their descendancy can be traced to the Uí Néill, including the High King Niall of the Nine Hostages.

The patron of the Donnellan's of Ui Maine is Saint Grellan. The family derive their name from Domnallan mac Maelbrigdi. A species of Carpenter ant, Camponotus donnellani, and an Antarctic glacier, the Donnellan Glacier, are both named for the Donnellan family.

According to historian C. Thomas Cairney, the O'Donnellans were a chiefly family of the Uí Mháine tribe who in turn were from the Dumnonii or Laigin who were the third wave of Celts to settle in Ireland during the first century BC.

First found in Galway, the family has held a seat from ancient times, dating back from at least the 1300s. One of the twelve ancient seats of Connacht, they resided over large areas of Galway, Roscommon and eventually West Meath. Ballydonnellan Castle was the seat of the Donnellans of Ui Maine. The heads of this family were the chiefs of Clann Bhreasail, the district lying between Loughrea and Ballinasloe. The original castle is said to have been erected as early as 936 but this, more likely than not, was probably a ring fort. Another castle built on the same site was destroyed by fire some time before 1412 when it was rebuilt by the Donnellans. During the 17th century the family added a long two-storey house to the side of the castle. During the following century the castle was renovated and extended to form an end pavillon wing, and a matching wing was added to the other end of the seventeenth-century structure. The wings were redesigned after 1787 when the façade of the central range was altered with a four-bay pedimented breakfront. One of the wings was destroyed by fire before 1913 but the entire house was in ruin by 1978. This is located about two miles north of Kilreekill.

== Notable Donnellans ==
- Ainglioch Ó Dónalláin, poet, fl. mid-14th or mid-15th century
- Andrea Donnellan, principal investigator at the Jet Propulsion Laboratory and namesake of the Donnellan Glacier
- Anne Donnellan, critic, writer, and namesake of the Donnellan Lectures at Trinity College Dublin, c. 1700–1762
- Declan Donnellan, theater director
- Domnallan mac Maelbrigdi of Ui Maine, ancestor of the Donnellans of Galway, fl. c. 9th/10th century
- Flann Óc mac Séoan Ó Domhnalláin, Ollamh Síol Muireadaigh, 1404
- Flann Óge Ó Domhnalláin, Chief Poet of Connacht, died 1342
- James Donnellan, lawyer and politician, c. 1588–1665.
- John Donnellan, Irish politician
- John W. Donnellan, first treasurer of the Wyoming Territory
- Kara Antonio (née Donnellan), Australian footballer
- Keith Donnellan, philosopher
- Leigh Donnellan, Australian former rugby union player, born 1957
- Luke Donnellan, Australian politician
- Martin Donnellan, recipient of the Scott Medal, born 1948.
- Mael Sechlainn Ó Domhnalláin, Irish poet, died 1375
- Michael Donnellan, Irish Clann na Talmhan politician
- Michael Donnellan, GAA footballer
- Michael Donnellan, fashon designer and head of Lachasse
- Mick Donnellan, Irish playwright
- Nanci Donnellan, sports radio broadcaster
- Nehemiah Donnellan, Archbishop of Tuam, fl. c. 1560–1609
- Pádhraic Ó Domhnalláin, Irish duelist, fl. 1830.
- Padraig Ó Domhnallain, short-story writer, born 1884.
- Pat Donnellan, GAA footballer
- Philip Donnellan, English documentary film-maker
- Steve Donnellan, Australian evolutionary biologist
- Thomas Donnellan, Roman Catholic Archbishop of Atlanta, 1968–1987

== See also ==
- Irish clans
