= Ó Domhnalláin =

Gaelic family name

Ó Domhnalláin is the surname of a Brehon family from Máenmag in Uí Maine, now west County Galway.

== Overview ==
They held the post of Cathmhaol or Battle Champion of Uí Maine, but by the early 14th century had become poets and brehons.

The family took their name from Domnallan mac Maelbrigdi, fl. c. 9th/10th century.

Their principal home was at Ballydonnellan, County Galway.

An unrelated family of the same name was located in east Ulster.

== Annalistic references ==
The Irish annals record the following:

- Flann Óge Ó Domhnalláin, died 1342
- Mael Sechlainn Ó Domhnalláin, died 1375
- Flann Óc mac Séoan Ó Domhnalláin, died 1404
- Cormac Ó Domhnalláin, died 1436
- Ainglioch Ó Dónalláin, fl. mid-14th or mid-15th century

== Later bearers of the name ==
- Nehemiah Donnellan, fl. c. 1560–1609.
- Sir James Donnellan, Lord Chief Justice of the Common Pleas, c. 1588-1665
- Nehemiah Donellan, 1649–1705, lawyer and Chief Baron of the Exchequer
- Pádhraic Ó Domhnalláin, fl. 1830, duelist
- Padraig Ó Domhnallain, born 1884, short-story writer
- Michael Donnellan, 1900–1964, Clann na Talmhan politician
- Pat Donnellan, born 1941, footballer
- Martin Donnellan, born 1948, Garda Síochána recipient of the Scott Medal
- Michael Donnellan (Gaelic footballer), sportsperson
- Declan Donnellan, English theatre director, co-founder of Cheek by Jowl Theatre Company.
