= Amlaid Ua Domhnalláin =

Amlaid Ua Domhnalláin (died 1177), Chief poet of Connacht.

Amlaid Ua Domhnalláin was a member of a bardic family, Ó Domhnalláin of Clan Breasil, Máenmag in Uí Maine (now Ballydonnellan, County Galway).

Other such members of his family would include Flann Óc mac Séoan Ó Domhnalláin, Flann Óge Ó Domhnalláin, Mael Sechlainn Ó Domhnalláin, Pádhraic Ó Domhnalláin, Padraig Ó Domhnallain, Ainglioch Ó Dónalláin and Seosamh Ó Dónalláin.

The surname Donnellan remains fairly common in Galway.

Preceded by Aindileas Ua Chlúmháin	Chief Poet of Connacht; 1170–1177	Succeeded by Flann Óge Ó Domhnalláin
