= Mael Sechlainn Ó Domhnalláin =

Irish poet

- Writing career
- Genre: Poetry

Mael Sechlainn Ó Domhnalláin (died 1375) was an Irish poet.

Ó Domhnalláin was a member of the Ó Domhnalláin bardic family of Ui Maine (now south-west).

It is unknown if any examples of his work survive.

== See also ==
- Domnallan mac Maelbrigdi
- Nehemiah Donnellan, Archbishop of Tuam, died 1609.
- Ainglioch Ó Dónalláin, poet, fl. mid-14th or mid-15th century.
- Sir James Donnellan, fl. 1607–1665.
- Nehemiah Donnellan, lawyer.
- Captain John Donnellan, fl. 1777–1781.
- Michael Donnellan (1900–1964), Clann na Talmhan politician.
