= Domnallan mac Maelbrigdi =

Domnallan mac Maelbrigdi was an Irish dynast (fl. c. 9th/10th century).

== Biography ==
Domnallan was the son of Maelbrigdi, a member of the Ui Maine dynasty, located in south-east Connacht. His pedigree is given as Domnallan mac Maelbrigdi mic Grenain mic Loingsich mic Domnallain mic Bresail mic Dluthaig mic Fithchellaig mic Dicholla mic Eogain Find.

== Descendants ==
The bardic family of Ó Domhnalláin derived their surname from him. Originally located in Ballydonnellan, County Galway, they were of a sept of the Uí Maine called Clann Breasail, who held the position of Cathmhaol or Battle Champion.

Descendants of the Uí Domhnalláin are still found in Galway and Roscommon under the surname Donnellan.

== See also ==
- Flann Óge Ó Domhnalláin, Chief Poet of Connacht, died 1342.
- Ainglioch Ó Dónalláin, poet, fl. mid-14th or mid-15th century.
- Nehemiah Donnellan, Archbishop of Tuam, fl. c. 1560–1609.
- James Donnellan, lawyer and politician, c. 1588 – 1665.
- Pádhraic Ó Domhnalláin, Irish duelist, fl. 1830.
- Padraig Ó Domhnallain, short-story writer, born 1884.
- Michael Donnellan, Clann na Talmhan politician, 1900–1964.
- John Donnellan, former Irish politician and sportsperson, born 1937.
- Pat Donnellan, retired sportsperson, born 1941.
- Martin Donnellan, recipient of the Scott Medal, born 1948.
- Michael Donnellan (Gaelic footballer), sportsperson.
