= Nehemiah Donnellan (disambiguation) =

Nehemiah Donnellan was Archbishop of Tuam from 1595 until his resignation in 1609.

Nehemiah Donnellan or Donellan may also refer to

- Nehemiah Donnellan (1649–1705), Irish lawyer
- Nehemiah Donnellan (1698–1770), Irish MP for County Tipperary (Parliament of Ireland constituency)
- Nehemiah Nixon Donnellan (1722–1784), Irish MP for Clogher (Parliament of Ireland constituency)
