= 1964 Galway East by-election =

By-election to the 17th Dáil

- 3 December 1964
- Turnout: 42,029 (78.1%)
	Donnellan	Hussey	Ó Ceallaigh
Nominee	John Donnellan	Thomas Hussey	Pádraig Ó Ceallaigh
Party	Fine Gael	Fianna Fáil	Sinn Féin
First preferences	20,920	19,612	1,497
Percentage	49.8%	46.6%	3.6%
Final count	21,706	19,977	–
TD before election
Michael Donnellan
Clann na Talmhan
TD after election
John Donnellan
Fine Gael

A Dáil by-election was held in the constituency of Galway East in Ireland on Thursday, 3 December 1964, to fill a vacancy in the 17th Dáil. It followed the death of Clann na Talmhan Teachta Dála (TD) Michael Donnellan on 27 September 1964.

The writ of election to fill the vacancy was agreed by the Dáil on 5 November 1964.

The by-election was won by the Fine Gael candidate John Donnellan, son of the deceased TD, Michael Donnellan.

== Result ==
1964 Galway East by-election
Party	Candidate	FPv%	Count	
Party	Candidate	FPv%	1	2
Fine Gael	John Donnellan	49.8	20,920	21,706
Fianna Fáil	Thomas Hussey	46.6	19,612	19,977
Sinn Féin	Pádraig Ó Ceallaigh	3.6	1,497	
Electorate: 53,823 Valid: 42,029 Quota: 21,015 Turnout: 78.1%
