= Anne Donnellan =

Irish literary critic

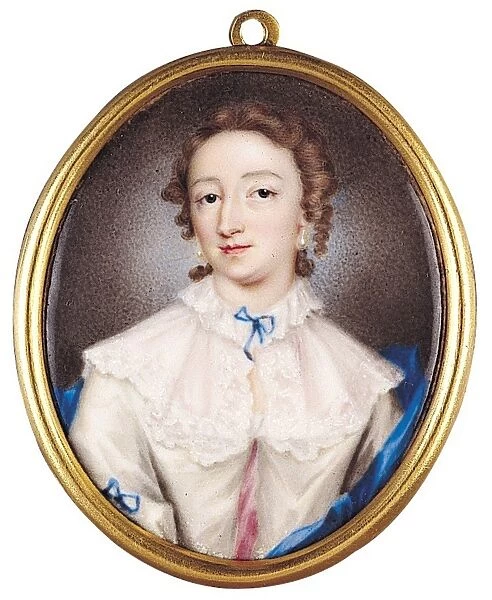
- 1752 painting of Anne Donnellan by Rupert Barber
- Born: c. 1700; Ireland
- Died: 21 May 1762 (aged 61–62); Hanover Square, Middlesex
- Parent: Nehemiah Donnellan (father)

Anne Donnellan (c.1700 – 21 May 1762) was an Irish promoter of literature, learning, and the arts, and literary critic. She has been referred to as an Irish "proto Bluestocking."

== Early life and family ==
Anne Donnellan was born around 1700, the daughter of Nehemiah Donnellan and his estranged second wife, Martha Donnellan (née Ussher) (1677–1751). There is no record of Donnellan's birth or baptism, but later records state that she was in her late twenties in 1729. Her mother remarried in 1712 or 1713, Philip Perceval, and from 1727 Donnellan lived with them in Middlesex. She would occasionally return to Ireland, sometimes for years at a time. When her sister, Catherine, married Robert Clayton in 1728, he gave Catherine's dowry to Donnellan which gave her financial independence. Her brother Christopher, also supported her. Donnellan never married, but her friend Elizabeth Montagu wrote in a letter that Donnellan had refused a proposal from George Berkeley.

== Promoter of the arts ==
Donnellan was friends with a number of the most prominent figures in music, art and literature. Mary Barber included some of Donnellan's verse in her volume Poems on several occasions (1734). Jonathan Swift nicknamed her "the siren", and in a letter to him she described herself as "an asserter of the rights and privileges of women." Donnellan was a talented musician, renowned for her singing which earned her the pet name "Phill" or "Philomel". She was friend of George Frideric Handel, most likely meeting him at a social gathering hosted by her close companion, Mary Delany. Donnellan and Delany were in the small audience hearing the first rehearsals of Handel's Alcina (1735) and Imeneo (1740) operas. Donnellan's four Hanover Square properties were all located very close to Handel's residence, as seen in a 1747 map of Southwark and London. Handel left Donnellan £50 in his will. She was associated with the nascent Bluestockings group through her friendship with Montagu. She encouraged Montagu to continue with her education.

It does not appear that Donnellan aspired to be a published writer, she often was engaged in the criticism of the unpublished works of others. After meeting Samuel Richardson in 1750, they became frequent correspondents and close friends, with both of them leaving a bequest of mourning rings in their respective wills. When she visited Dublin in 1751, Richardson sought her advice on his History of Sir Charles Grandison (1754).

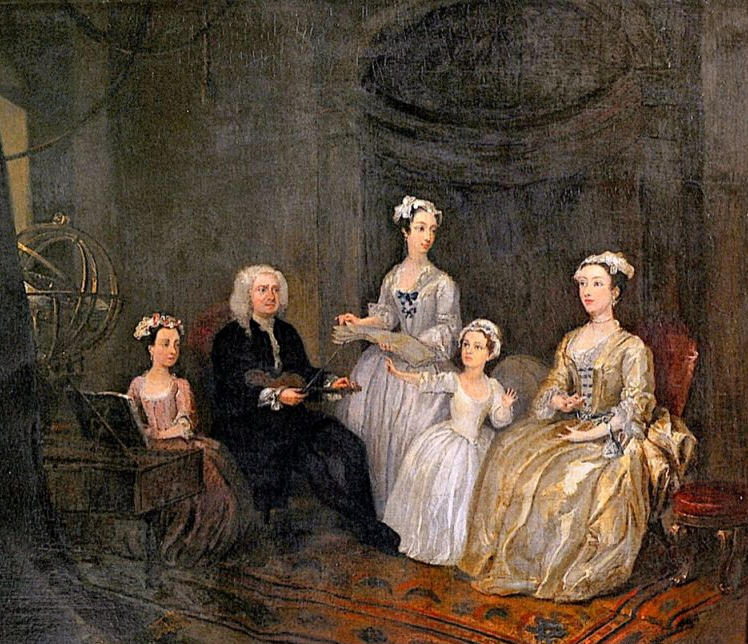
Anne Donnellan (center), c. 1731

== Death and legacy ==
She suffered an unnamed illness in 1733 to 1734 which caused her pains in her arms and legs. Donnellan's siblings died in quick succession in 1751 and 1752, which resulted in trauma due to disputes over their wills. Following this her health declined and she died on 21 May 1762 at Hanover Square, Middlesex.

She left a bequest of a quarter of her assets, £1,243, to Trinity College Dublin, which was to be used to promote "religious learning and good manners." The money was used to begin an annual divinity lecture series, the Donnellan Lectures, which were the college's first public lecture series. A list of these lectures from 1795 to 1945 was published in the Trinity College record in 1951 (pages 396–369). In 1731, she was painted in a family groups of the Wesleys by William Hogarth. A miniature of Donnellan from 1751 painted by Rupert Barber is held in the collections of the Ulster Museum.
