= Thomas Hussey (Irish politician) =

Irish politician (1936–2024)

Senator
- In office 8 October 1981 – 17 February 1993
- Constituency: Agricultural Panel

Minister of State
- 1980–1981: Health
- 1980–1981: Social Welfare
- 1978–1980: Agriculture

Parliamentary Secretary
- 1977–1978: Agriculture

Teachta Dála
- In office June 1977 – June 1981
- Constituency: Galway East
- In office June 1969 – June 1977
- Constituency: Galway North-East

Personal details
- Born: 25 January 1936 County Galway, Ireland
- Died: 21 January 2024 (aged 87) Galway, Ireland
- Party: Fianna Fáil
- Spouse: Bridie Hussey
- Children: 6

Thomas Hussey (25 January 1936 – 21 January 2024) was an Irish Fianna Fáil politician. He was a Teachta Dála (TD) from 1969 to 1981, and then a Senator from 1981 to 1993.

From County Galway, he was a farmer, auctioneer and insurance representative before entering politics. He stood unsuccessfully as a Fianna Fáil candidate for Dáil Éireann in the Galway East constituency at the 1964 by-election and in the 1965 general election. Hussey won a seat in the new Galway North-East constituency at the 1969 general election, and held it until the constituency was abolished in 1977. He then secured election in the re-created Galway East at the 1977 general election, but lost there in 1981. He stood again at the next three general elections, but never returned to the Dáil. He served as Minister of State at the Department of Agriculture from 1977 to 1980; and Minister of State at the Department of Social Welfare and Minister of State at the Department of Health from 1980 to 1981.

However, after his 1981 defeat he was elected to the 15th Seanad by the Agricultural Panel, and held that seat until his defeat in the 1993 Seanad election to the 20th Seanad, when he retired from politics.

Thomas Hussey died at University Hospital Galway on 21 January 2024, at the age of 87.

Political offices
| Preceded by Michael Pat Murphy | Parliamentary Secretary to the Minister for Agriculture; 1977–1978 | Succeeded by Office of Minister of State at the Department of Agriculture |
| Preceded by Office of Parliamentary Secretary to the Minister for Agriculture | Minister of State at the Department of Agriculture; 1978–1980 | Succeeded by Michael Smith |
| Preceded by Tom Nolan | Minister of State at the Department of Social Welfare; 1980–1981 | Succeeded by Mary Flaherty |
| Preceded by Tom Nolan | Minister of State at the Department of Health; 1980–1981 | Succeeded by Donal Creed |

| Dáil | Election | Deputy (Party) | Deputy (Party) | Deputy (Party) |
|---|---|---|---|---|
| 19th | 1969 | Thomas Hussey (FF) | Michael F. Kitt (FF) | John Donnellan (FG) |
| 20th | 1973 | Thomas Hussey (FF) | Michael F. Kitt (FF) | John Donnellan (FG) |
| 20th | 1975 by-election | Thomas Hussey (FF) | Michael P. Kitt (FF) | John Donnellan (FG) |
| 21st | 1977 | Constituency abolished. See Galway East | | |

| Dáil | Election | Deputy (Party) | Deputy (Party) | Deputy (Party) | Deputy (Party) |
|---|---|---|---|---|---|
| 9th | 1937 | Frank Fahy (FF) | Mark Killilea Snr (FF) | Patrick Beegan (FF) | Seán Broderick (FG) |
| 10th | 1938 | Frank Fahy (FF) | Mark Killilea Snr (FF) | Patrick Beegan (FF) | Seán Broderick (FG) |
| 11th | 1943 | Frank Fahy (FF) | Mark Killilea Snr (FF) | Patrick Beegan (FF) | Michael Donnellan (CnaT) |
| 12th | 1944 | Frank Fahy (FF) | Mark Killilea Snr (FF) | Patrick Beegan (FF) | Michael Donnellan (CnaT) |
| 13th | 1948 | Constituency abolished. See Galway North and Galway South | | | |

| Dáil | Election | Deputy (Party) | Deputy (Party) | Deputy (Party) | Deputy (Party) | Deputy (Party) |
|---|---|---|---|---|---|---|
| 17th | 1961 | Michael F. Kitt (FF) | Anthony Millar (FF) | Michael Carty (FF) | Michael Donnellan (CnaT) | Brigid Hogan-O'Higgins (FG) |
| 17th | 1964 by-election | Michael F. Kitt (FF) | Anthony Millar (FF) | Michael Carty (FF) | John Donnellan (FG) | Brigid Hogan-O'Higgins (FG) |
| 18th | 1965 | Michael F. Kitt (FF) | Anthony Millar (FF) | Michael Carty (FF) | John Donnellan (FG) | Brigid Hogan-O'Higgins (FG) |
| 19th | 1969 | Constituency abolished. See Galway North-East and Clare–South Galway | | | | |

| Dáil | Election | Deputy (Party) | Deputy (Party) | Deputy (Party) | Deputy (Party) |
|---|---|---|---|---|---|
| 21st | 1977 | Johnny Callanan (FF) | Thomas Hussey (FF) | Mark Killilea Jnr (FF) | John Donnellan (FG) |
| 22nd | 1981 | Johnny Callanan (FF) | Michael P. Kitt (FF) | Paul Connaughton Snr (FG) | 3 seats 1981–1997 |
| 23rd | 1982 (Feb) | Johnny Callanan (FF) | Michael P. Kitt (FF) | Paul Connaughton Snr (FG) | 3 seats 1981–1997 |
| 23rd | 1982 by-election | Noel Treacy (FF) | Michael P. Kitt (FF) | Paul Connaughton Snr (FG) | 3 seats 1981–1997 |
| 24th | 1982 (Nov) | Noel Treacy (FF) | Michael P. Kitt (FF) | Paul Connaughton Snr (FG) | 3 seats 1981–1997 |
| 25th | 1987 | Noel Treacy (FF) | Michael P. Kitt (FF) | Paul Connaughton Snr (FG) | 3 seats 1981–1997 |
| 26th | 1989 | Noel Treacy (FF) | Michael P. Kitt (FF) | Paul Connaughton Snr (FG) | 3 seats 1981–1997 |
| 27th | 1992 | Noel Treacy (FF) | Michael P. Kitt (FF) | Paul Connaughton Snr (FG) | 3 seats 1981–1997 |
| 28th | 1997 | Noel Treacy (FF) | Michael P. Kitt (FF) | Paul Connaughton Snr (FG) | Ulick Burke (FG) |
| 29th | 2002 | Noel Treacy (FF) | Joe Callanan (FF) | Paul Connaughton Snr (FG) | Paddy McHugh (Ind.) |
| 30th | 2007 | Noel Treacy (FF) | Michael P. Kitt (FF) | Paul Connaughton Snr (FG) | Ulick Burke (FG) |
| 31st | 2011 | Colm Keaveney (Lab) | Michael P. Kitt (FF) | Ciarán Cannon (FG) | Paul Connaughton Jnr (FG) |
| 32nd | 2016 | Seán Canney (Ind.) | Anne Rabbitte (FF) | Ciarán Cannon (FG) | 3 seats 2016–2024 |
| 33rd | 2020 | Seán Canney (Ind.) | Anne Rabbitte (FF) | Ciarán Cannon (FG) | 3 seats 2016–2024 |
| 34th | 2024 | Seán Canney (Ind.) | Albert Dolan (FF) | Peter Roche (FG) | Louis O'Hara (SF) |
