= Patrick Giles (politician) =

Irish politician (1899–1965)

Teachta Dála
- In office February 1948 – October 1961
- Constituency: Meath
- In office July 1937 – February 1948
- Constituency: Meath–Westmeath

Personal details
- Born: 1899 Longwood, County Meath, Ireland
- Died: 13 March 1965 (aged 65–66) County Meath, Ireland
- Party: Fine Gael
- Military career
- Allegiance: Irish Republic; Irish Free State
- Service: Irish Republican Army; National Army
- Rank: Captain
- Conflicts: Irish War of Independence; Irish Civil War

Patrick Giles (1899 – 13 March 1965) was an Irish Fine Gael politician. He was born in 1899 on a family farm outside Longwood village in County Meath.

During the Irish War of Independence he was a member of the Irish Republican Brotherhood (IRB), and was captain of the local Longwood Company. In 1920 he and some of his brothers took part in a raid on the Royal Irish Constabulary (RIC) Barracks in Trim, which was burnt to the ground. The aim of the raid was to supply arms to local volunteers. After the raid the arms were dispersed to different sites, one of which was the Giles family farm. During a raid by the Crown forces, his name was found on a note linking him to the storing of these arms and he was sent to prison in Perth, Scotland for three years, but he got out after one year shortly before the Anglo-Irish Truce. In the split that followed after the Anglo-Irish Treaty, he, like most of the IRA in County Meath took the Pro-treaty side. Later he served in the National Army and achieved the rank of captain.

In 1934 he was elected to Meath County Council. In 1935, Giles was elected to the Executive Committee of Eoin O'Duffy's splinter faction of the League of Youth.

At the 1937 general election he was elected as a Teachta Dála (TD) for Fine Gael representing the Meath–Westmeath. By this time he had acquired a farm in Drumlargan near Summerhill, County Meath. He held his seat in subsequent elections until the constituency was abolished prior to the 1948 general election. At the 1948 general election he was elected for the re-established Meath constituency. He held his seat up to the 1961 general election in which he was unable to run due to deteriorating health. He died on 13 March 1965.

== Antisemitic quotes ==
"Who owns the wealth of Dublin? Is it the Irish volunteers or the Irish people? No, it is not, but the rotten old Jews." – Dáil Éireann, 1 December 1937.

" I think it is a terrible thing that we, who call ourselves a Christian people, should stand idly by and allow the Jews, the Gentiles, the Freemasons and Communists to dictate the policy of the world. We stand for Christianity. We stand for it against the Jews, the Gentiles, the Reds and the Freemasons of the world." – Dáil Éireann, 13 July 1938.

"To-day Minister for Defence Frank Aiken is nothing more than Britain's tool for the coming European war, engineered by the financiers and Jews of the world." – Dáil Éireann, 16 February 1939.

"... the finance of the country is in the hands of Jews and foreigners" – Dáil Éireann, 10 May 1940.

== Sources ==
- Politics and War in Meath 1913–1923, Oliver Coogan.

Dáil	Election	Deputy (Party)	Deputy (Party)	Deputy (Party)	Deputy (Party)	Deputy (Party)
9th	1937	Matthew O'Reilly (FF)	Michael Kennedy (FF)	James Kelly (FF)	Charles Fagan (FG)	Patrick Giles (FG)
10th	1938	Matthew O'Reilly (FF)	Michael Kennedy (FF)	James Kelly (FF)	Charles Fagan (FG)	Patrick Giles (FG)
11th	1943	Matthew O'Reilly (FF)	Michael Kennedy (FF)	Michael Hilliard (FF)	Charles Fagan (FG)	Patrick Giles (FG)
12th	1944	Matthew O'Reilly (FF)	Michael Kennedy (FF)	Michael Hilliard (FF)	Charles Fagan (FG)	Patrick Giles (FG)
13th	1948	Constituency abolished. See Meath and Longford–Westmeath				

Dáil	Election	Deputy (Party)	Deputy (Party)	Deputy (Party)
4th	1923	Patrick Mulvany (FP)	David Hall (Lab)	Eamonn Duggan (CnaG)
5th	1927 (Jun)	Matthew O'Reilly (FF)	David Hall (Lab)	Eamonn Duggan (CnaG)
6th	1927 (Sep)	Matthew O'Reilly (FF)	Arthur Matthews (CnaG)	Eamonn Duggan (CnaG)
7th	1932	James Kelly (FF)	Arthur Matthews (CnaG)	Eamonn Duggan (CnaG)
8th	1933	James Kelly (FF)	Robert Davitt (CnaG)	Matthew O'Reilly (FF)
9th	1937	Constituency abolished. See Meath–Westmeath		

Dáil	Election	Deputy (Party)	Deputy (Party)	Deputy (Party)	Deputy (Party)	Deputy (Party)
13th	1948	Matthew O'Reilly (FF)	Michael Hilliard (FF)	3 seats until 1977	Patrick Giles (FG)	3 seats until 1977
14th	1951	Matthew O'Reilly (FF)	Michael Hilliard (FF)	3 seats until 1977	Patrick Giles (FG)	3 seats until 1977
15th	1954	James Tully (Lab)	Michael Hilliard (FF)	3 seats until 1977	Patrick Giles (FG)	3 seats until 1977
16th	1957	James Griffin (FF)	Michael Hilliard (FF)	3 seats until 1977	Patrick Giles (FG)	3 seats until 1977
16th	1959 by-election	Henry Johnston (FF)	Michael Hilliard (FF)	3 seats until 1977	Patrick Giles (FG)	3 seats until 1977
17th	1961	James Tully (Lab)	Michael Hilliard (FF)	3 seats until 1977	Denis Farrelly (FG)	3 seats until 1977
18th	1965	James Tully (Lab)	Michael Hilliard (FF)	3 seats until 1977	Denis Farrelly (FG)	3 seats until 1977
19th	1969	James Tully (Lab)	Michael Hilliard (FF)	3 seats until 1977	John Bruton (FG)	3 seats until 1977
20th	1973	James Tully (Lab)	Brendan Crinion (FF)	3 seats until 1977	John Bruton (FG)	3 seats until 1977
21st	1977	James Tully (Lab)	Brendan Crinion (FF)	Jim Fitzsimons (FF)	John Bruton (FG)	4 seats 1977–1981
22nd	1981	James Tully (Lab)	Brendan Crinion (FF)	Jim Fitzsimons (FF)	John Bruton (FG)	John V. Farrelly (FG)
23rd	1982 (Feb)	Michael Lynch (FF)	Colm Hilliard (FF)	Jim Fitzsimons (FF)	John Bruton (FG)	John V. Farrelly (FG)
24th	1982 (Nov)	Frank McLoughlin (Lab)	Colm Hilliard (FF)	Jim Fitzsimons (FF)	John Bruton (FG)	John V. Farrelly (FG)
25th	1987	Michael Lynch (FF)	Colm Hilliard (FF)	Noel Dempsey (FF)	John Bruton (FG)	John V. Farrelly (FG)
26th	1989	Mary Wallace (FF)	Colm Hilliard (FF)	Noel Dempsey (FF)	John Bruton (FG)	John V. Farrelly (FG)
27th	1992	Mary Wallace (FF)	Colm Hilliard (FF)	Noel Dempsey (FF)	John Bruton (FG)	Brian Fitzgerald (Lab)
28th	1997	Mary Wallace (FF)	Johnny Brady (FF)	Noel Dempsey (FF)	John Bruton (FG)	John V. Farrelly (FG)
29th	2002	Mary Wallace (FF)	Johnny Brady (FF)	Noel Dempsey (FF)	John Bruton (FG)	Damien English (FG)
29th	2005 by-election	Mary Wallace (FF)	Johnny Brady (FF)	Noel Dempsey (FF)	Shane McEntee (FG)	Damien English (FG)
30th	2007	Constituency abolished. See Meath East and Meath West				
