= Matthew O'Reilly =

Irish politician (1880–1962)

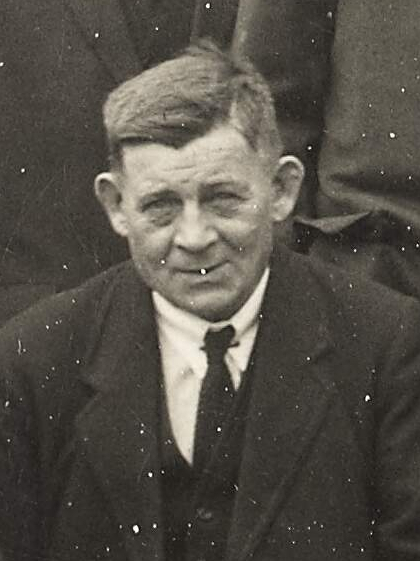
- O'Reilly in 1927

Teachta Dála
- In office February 1948 – May 1954
- In office June 1927 – July 1937
- Constituency: Meath
- In office July 1937 – February 1948
- Constituency: Meath–Westmeath

Personal details
- Born: 1 March 1880 County Meath, Ireland
- Died: 13 November 1962 (aged 82) County Meath, Ireland
- Party: Fianna Fáil
- Education: Castleknock College

Matthew O'Reilly (1 March 1880 – 13 November 1962) was an Irish politician. A farmer, he was first elected to Dáil Éireann as a Fianna Fáil Teachta Dála (TD) for the Meath constituency at the June 1927 general election. He was re-elected at each subsequent general election until he lost his seat at the 1954 general election. From 1937 to 1948, he was elected for the Meath–Westmeath constituency.

He was educated at Castleknock College.

| Dáil | Election | Deputy (Party) | Deputy (Party) | Deputy (Party) |
|---|---|---|---|---|
| 4th | 1923 | Patrick Mulvany (FP) | David Hall (Lab) | Eamonn Duggan (CnaG) |
| 5th | 1927 (Jun) | Matthew O'Reilly (FF) | David Hall (Lab) | Eamonn Duggan (CnaG) |
| 6th | 1927 (Sep) | Matthew O'Reilly (FF) | Arthur Matthews (CnaG) | Eamonn Duggan (CnaG) |
| 7th | 1932 | James Kelly (FF) | Arthur Matthews (CnaG) | Eamonn Duggan (CnaG) |
| 8th | 1933 | James Kelly (FF) | Robert Davitt (CnaG) | Matthew O'Reilly (FF) |
| 9th | 1937 | Constituency abolished. See Meath–Westmeath | | |

| Dáil | Election | Deputy (Party) | Deputy (Party) | Deputy (Party) | Deputy (Party) | Deputy (Party) |
|---|---|---|---|---|---|---|
| 13th | 1948 | Matthew O'Reilly (FF) | Michael Hilliard (FF) | 3 seats until 1977 | Patrick Giles (FG) | 3 seats until 1977 |
| 14th | 1951 | Matthew O'Reilly (FF) | Michael Hilliard (FF) | 3 seats until 1977 | Patrick Giles (FG) | 3 seats until 1977 |
| 15th | 1954 | James Tully (Lab) | Michael Hilliard (FF) | 3 seats until 1977 | Patrick Giles (FG) | 3 seats until 1977 |
| 16th | 1957 | James Griffin (FF) | Michael Hilliard (FF) | 3 seats until 1977 | Patrick Giles (FG) | 3 seats until 1977 |
| 16th | 1959 by-election | Henry Johnston (FF) | Michael Hilliard (FF) | 3 seats until 1977 | Patrick Giles (FG) | 3 seats until 1977 |
| 17th | 1961 | James Tully (Lab) | Michael Hilliard (FF) | 3 seats until 1977 | Denis Farrelly (FG) | 3 seats until 1977 |
| 18th | 1965 | James Tully (Lab) | Michael Hilliard (FF) | 3 seats until 1977 | Denis Farrelly (FG) | 3 seats until 1977 |
| 19th | 1969 | James Tully (Lab) | Michael Hilliard (FF) | 3 seats until 1977 | John Bruton (FG) | 3 seats until 1977 |
| 20th | 1973 | James Tully (Lab) | Brendan Crinion (FF) | 3 seats until 1977 | John Bruton (FG) | 3 seats until 1977 |
| 21st | 1977 | James Tully (Lab) | Brendan Crinion (FF) | Jim Fitzsimons (FF) | John Bruton (FG) | 4 seats 1977–1981 |
| 22nd | 1981 | James Tully (Lab) | Brendan Crinion (FF) | Jim Fitzsimons (FF) | John Bruton (FG) | John V. Farrelly (FG) |
| 23rd | 1982 (Feb) | Michael Lynch (FF) | Colm Hilliard (FF) | Jim Fitzsimons (FF) | John Bruton (FG) | John V. Farrelly (FG) |
| 24th | 1982 (Nov) | Frank McLoughlin (Lab) | Colm Hilliard (FF) | Jim Fitzsimons (FF) | John Bruton (FG) | John V. Farrelly (FG) |
| 25th | 1987 | Michael Lynch (FF) | Colm Hilliard (FF) | Noel Dempsey (FF) | John Bruton (FG) | John V. Farrelly (FG) |
| 26th | 1989 | Mary Wallace (FF) | Colm Hilliard (FF) | Noel Dempsey (FF) | John Bruton (FG) | John V. Farrelly (FG) |
| 27th | 1992 | Mary Wallace (FF) | Colm Hilliard (FF) | Noel Dempsey (FF) | John Bruton (FG) | Brian Fitzgerald (Lab) |
| 28th | 1997 | Mary Wallace (FF) | Johnny Brady (FF) | Noel Dempsey (FF) | John Bruton (FG) | John V. Farrelly (FG) |
| 29th | 2002 | Mary Wallace (FF) | Johnny Brady (FF) | Noel Dempsey (FF) | John Bruton (FG) | Damien English (FG) |
| 29th | 2005 by-election | Mary Wallace (FF) | Johnny Brady (FF) | Noel Dempsey (FF) | Shane McEntee (FG) | Damien English (FG) |
| 30th | 2007 | Constituency abolished. See Meath East and Meath West | | | | |

| Dáil | Election | Deputy (Party) | Deputy (Party) | Deputy (Party) | Deputy (Party) | Deputy (Party) |
|---|---|---|---|---|---|---|
| 9th | 1937 | Matthew O'Reilly (FF) | Michael Kennedy (FF) | James Kelly (FF) | Charles Fagan (FG) | Patrick Giles (FG) |
| 10th | 1938 | Matthew O'Reilly (FF) | Michael Kennedy (FF) | James Kelly (FF) | Charles Fagan (FG) | Patrick Giles (FG) |
| 11th | 1943 | Matthew O'Reilly (FF) | Michael Kennedy (FF) | Michael Hilliard (FF) | Charles Fagan (FG) | Patrick Giles (FG) |
| 12th | 1944 | Matthew O'Reilly (FF) | Michael Kennedy (FF) | Michael Hilliard (FF) | Charles Fagan (FG) | Patrick Giles (FG) |
| 13th | 1948 | Constituency abolished. See Meath and Longford–Westmeath | | | | |
