= Meath–Westmeath =

Dáil constituency (1937–1948)

- Former Dáil constituency

Former constituency
- Created: 1937
- Abolished: 1948
- Seats: 5
- Local government areas: County Meath; County Westmeath
- Created from: Meath; Longford–Westmeath
- Replaced by: Meath; Longford–Westmeath

Meath–Westmeath was a parliamentary constituency represented in Dáil Éireann, the lower house of the Irish parliament or Oireachtas from 1937 to 1948. The constituency elected 5 deputies (Teachtaí Dála, commonly known as TDs) to the Dáil, on the system of proportional representation by means of the single transferable vote (PR-STV).

== History ==
The constituency was created under the Electoral (Revision of Constituencies) Act 1935 for the 1937 general election to the 9th Dáil. It was last used for the 1944 general election to the 12th Dáil.

Meath–Westmeath was abolished under the Electoral (Amendment) Act 1947, and replaced by the two new constituencies of Meath and Longford–Westmeath.

== Boundaries ==
The 1935 Act defined its area as: "The administrative County of Meath and the administrative County of Westmeath except the portion thereof which is comprised in the County Constituency of Athlone–Longford."

== TDs ==
Teachtaí Dála (TDs) for Meath–Westmeath 1937–1948
Key to parties: FF = Fianna Fáil; FG = Fine Gael
Dáil	Election	Deputy (Party)	Deputy (Party)	Deputy (Party)	Deputy (Party)	Deputy (Party)
9th	1937	Matthew O'Reilly (FF)	Michael Kennedy (FF)	James Kelly (FF)	Charles Fagan (FG)	Patrick Giles (FG)
10th	1938	Matthew O'Reilly (FF)	Michael Kennedy (FF)	James Kelly (FF)	Charles Fagan (FG)	Patrick Giles (FG)
11th	1943	Matthew O'Reilly (FF)	Michael Kennedy (FF)	Michael Hilliard (FF)	Charles Fagan (FG)	Patrick Giles (FG)
12th	1944	Matthew O'Reilly (FF)	Michael Kennedy (FF)	Michael Hilliard (FF)	Charles Fagan (FG)	Patrick Giles (FG)
13th	1948	Constituency abolished. See Meath and Longford–Westmeath				

Note: The columns in this table are used only for presentational purposes, and no significance should be attached to the order of columns. For details of the order in which seats were won at each election, see the detailed results of that election.

== Elections ==
*: Outgoing TD

=== 1944 general election ===
1944 general election: Meath–Westmeath
Party	Candidate	FPv%	Count								
Party	Candidate	FPv%	1	2	3	4	5	6	7	8	9
Fianna Fáil	Michael Hilliard	19.5	8,648								
Fine Gael	Charles Fagan	14.9	6,606	6,617	6,705	6,845	6,960	7,967			
Fianna Fáil	Michael Kennedy	12.6	5,560	5,677	5,717	5,730	7,113	7,244	7,274	8,750	
Fine Gael	Patrick Giles	12.4	5,497	5,548	5,564	5,783	5,791	6,393	6,846	7,007	7,085
Fianna Fáil	Matthew O'Reilly	10.9	4,828	5,143	5,152	5,188	5,416	5,536	5,565	8,114	
Labour	Peadar Cowan	8.9	3,961	3,986	4,622	4,795	4,857	4,977	5,051	5,153	5,208
Fianna Fáil	James Kelly	8.0	3,522	4,233	4,256	4,286	4,404	4,445	4,449		
Fianna Fáil	Patrick McKenna	4.5	1,970	1,991	2,001	2,007					
Clann na Talmhan	Gerry L'Estrange	3.6	1,613	1,622	1,642	2,169	2,230				
Clann na Talmhan	Michael Bracken	2.7	1,189	1,195	1,205						
Labour	Owen Comiskey	1.9	863	868							
Electorate: 64,104 Valid: 44,257 Quota: 7,377 Turnout: 69.0%

=== 1943 general election ===
1943 general election: Meath–Westmeath
Party	Candidate	FPv%	Count										
Party	Candidate	FPv%	1	2	3	4	5	6	7	8	9	10	11
Fine Gael	Charles Fagan	14.9	7,163	7,227	7,332	7,372	7,470	7,947	8,017	8,045			
Fianna Fáil	Michael Hilliard	14.8	7,160	7,166	7,456	7,491	7,627	7,770	8,027	9,126			
Fianna Fáil	Michael Kennedy	10.7	5,161	5,226	5,255	5,269	6,362	6,377	6,418	6,995	7,287	7,599	7,663
Fine Gael	Patrick Giles	8.7	4,202	4,206	4,383	4,544	4,560	5,861	6,134	6,245	8,465		
Labour	Peadar Cowan	8.3	3,983	4,305	4,484	4,502	4,553	4,629	6,276	6,337	6,937	6,956	7,113
Fianna Fáil	Matthew O'Reilly	7.8	3,786	3,796	3,882	3,942	4,107	4,207	4,261	6,241	6,561	7,210	7,415
Fianna Fáil	James Kelly	7.7	3,736	3,750	3,840	3,852	3,924	3,958	4,034				
Clann na Talmhan	Joseph Cooney	6.8	3,284	3,304	3,345	4,278	4,366	4,603	4,668	4,691			
Fine Gael	Michael Sweeney	5.1	2,439	2,444	2,479	2,529	2,536						
Labour	John Fitzgerald	4.3	2,081	2,312	2,571	2,582	2,596	2,660					
Fianna Fáil	Patrick McKenna	3.6	1,719	1,772	1,778	1,800							
Clann na Talmhan	Patrick McMahon	2.8	1,351	1,358	1,378								
Independent	Seán Doyle	2.8	1,349	1,356									
Labour	Charles McGurk	1.7	818										
Electorate: 64,104 Valid: 48,232 Quota: 8,039 Turnout: 75.2%

=== 1938 general election ===
1938 general election: Meath–Westmeath
Party	Candidate	FPv%	Count			
Party	Candidate	FPv%	1	2	3	4
Fianna Fáil	James Kelly	19.9	9,690			
Fianna Fáil	Michael Kennedy	18.8	9,139			
Fine Gael	Charles Fagan	15.8	7,665	7,673	7,915	8,413
Fianna Fáil	Matthew O'Reilly	15.5	7,552	9,066		
Fine Gael	Patrick Giles	14.3	6,959	6,986	7,085	9,309
Labour	Peadar Cowan	9.5	4,621	4,656	5,160	5,305
Fine Gael	Michael Sweeney	6.1	2,962	2,969	3,164	
Electorate: 61,877 Valid: 48,588 Quota: 8,099 Turnout: 78.5%

=== 1937 general election ===
1937 general election: Meath–Westmeath
Party	Candidate	FPv%	Count						
Party	Candidate	FPv%	1	2	3	4	5	6	7
Fianna Fáil	James Kelly	19.4	9,328						
Fine Gael	Charles Fagan	15.6	7,514	7,515	7,671	7,883	8,124		
Fianna Fáil	Matthew O'Reilly	14.8	7,111	7,950	7,992	8,056			
Fianna Fáil	Michael Kennedy	13.8	6,641	7,058	7,069	7,435	7,463	7,489	7,535
Fine Gael	Patrick Giles	13.2	6,354	6,366	6,519	6,546	7,428	9,849	
Fianna Fáil	Eugene Robbins	5.9	2,815	2,830	2,836	3,032	3,049	3,117	3,162
Fine Gael	Gerald Williamson	4.8	2,292	2,294	2,313	2,320	2,788		
Labour	Peadar Cowan	4.5	2,160	2,173	2,202	2,934	2,971	3,031	3,253
Fine Gael	Michael Sweeney	3.6	1,750	1,753	1,780	1,793			
Labour	John Hayden	3.5	1,667	1,671	1,684				
Independent	James Daly	1.0	486	488					
Electorate: 61,654 Valid: 48,118 Quota: 8,020 Turnout: 78.1%

== See also ==
- Dáil constituencies
- Politics of the Republic of Ireland
- Historic Dáil constituencies
- Elections in the Republic of Ireland
