= Dluthach mac Fithcheallach =

Dluthach mac Fithcheallach (died 738) was the 18th King of Uí Maine.

== Lifetime ==
There appears to be no details of his reign. During his reign, the following events occurred in Connacht and Ireland

- 717 – "A battle was fought between the Connaughtmen and the Corcu Baiscinn, wherein the son of Talamhnaigh was slain."
- 718 – "Inrachtach, son of Dunchadh Muirisce, King of Connaught, died in that battle of Almhain, if true."
- 723 – "Fachtna mac Folachtan, Abbot of Cluain Fearta Brenainn (Clonfert), died."
- 727 – "There was a cow seen at Deilginis Cualann, having one head and one body as far as her shoulders, two bodies from her shoulders hindwards, and two tails; she had six legs, was milked three times each day, and her milk was greater each time. Her milk, and some of the butter made of it, were tasted by many persons."
- 736 – "Flann Aighle, Bishop of Eachdhruim Aughrim, County Galway, died."

== Descendants ==
His son, Flaitheamhaill, gave his name to a family known as Clann Flaitheamhail Mic Dluthaigh. A short section on the clann gives a pedigree ending in one Maelbrighdi mac Innrachtach a great-great grandson of Dluthach. As the pedigree was not updated beyond Maelbrighdi's generation (c. 800) it would appear that many of Dluthach's descendants died out or faded into obscurity.

One sept that did survive was the Clann Breasil. A branch of the clan, descended from Domnallan mac Maelbrigdi, were surnamed Ó Domhnalláin. Based at Ballydonnellan, Loughrea, they became notable bards of Connacht and Munster. Their descent is given as:

Domhnallan, son of Maelbrighdi, son of Grenan, son of Loingsech, son of Domhnallan, son of Bresal, son of Dluthach, son of Fithchellach.

== Mac Aodhagáin ==
Dluthach is listed as the brother of Cosgrach, an ancestor of the Mac Aodhagáin family of professional poets and lawyers.

Maelisa, the Red, son of Saerbrethach, son of Flann, son of Gilla Suasanaigh, son of Saerbrethach, son of Muirchertach, son of Flann, son of Aedhagan, son of Goistin, son of Flaithemh, son of Flaithghil, son of Cosgrach, son of Fidhchellach.

Preceded by Seachnasach	King of Uí Maine; 711–738	Succeeded by Cathal Maenmaighe
