= Minister of State at the Department of Social Protection =

List of Irish ministers of state

The minister of state at the Department of Social Protection is a junior ministerial post in the Department of Social Protection of the Government of Ireland who may perform functions delegated by the minister of social protection. A minister of state does not hold cabinet rank.

== List of parliamentary secretaries ==
=== Department of Social Welfare 1951–1977 ===
Name	Term of office		Party	Government
Michael Kennedy	19 June 1951	2 June 1954	Fianna Fáil	6th
Michael Kennedy	21 March 1957	11 November 1961	Fianna Fáil	8th • 9th
Johnny Geoghegan	9 July 1969	14 March 1973	Fianna Fáil	13th
Frank Cluskey	14 March 1973	5 July 1977	Labour	14th

== List of ministers of state ==
=== Department of Social Welfare 1980–1997 ===
Name	Term of office		Party	Responsibilities	Government
Tom Nolan	25 March 1980	17 December 1980	Fianna Fáil		16th
Thomas Hussey	17 December 1980	30 June 1981	Fianna Fáil		16th
Mary Flaherty	30 June 1981	9 March 1982	Fine Gael	Poverty and the Family	17th
Denis Gallagher	23 March 1982	27 October 1982	Fianna Fáil	Social Welfare Claims	18th
Rory O'Hanlon	28 October 1982	14 December 1982	Fianna Fáil	Social Welfare Claims	18th
Fergus O'Brien	16 December 1982	15 December 1983	Fine Gael	Social Welfare Information	19th
John Donnellan	15 December 1983	10 March 1987	Fine Gael	Social Welfare Information	19th
Séamus Pattison	15 December 1983	20 January 1987	Labour	Social Welfare Administration	19th
Joan Burton	14 January 1993	15 December 1994	Labour	EC Poverty Plans and Tax and Social Welfare Codes	23rd
Bernard Durkan	20 December 1994	26 June 1997	Fine Gael		24th
=== Department of Social and Family Affairs 2007–2010 ===
Name	Term of office		Party	Responsibilities	Government
Máire Hoctor	9 July 2007	7 May 2008	Fianna Fáil	Older People	27th
Máire Hoctor	13 May 2008	22 April 2009	Fianna Fáil	Older People	28th
Áine Brady	22 April 2009	9 March 2011	Fianna Fáil	Older People and Health Promotion	28th
=== Department of Social Protection 2010–2017 ===
Name	Term of office		Party	Responsibilities	Government
Kevin Humphreys	15 July 2014	6 May 2016	Labour	Employment, Community and Social Support	29th
Finian McGrath	6 May 2016	14 June 2017	Independent	Disability Issues	30th
=== Department of Employment Affairs and Social Protection 2017–2020 ===
Name	Term of office		Party	Responsibilities	Government
Finian McGrath	20 June 2017	27 June 2020	Independent	Disability Issues	31st
Pat Breen	20 June 2017	27 June 2020	Fine Gael	Trade, Employment, Business, EU Digital Single Market and Data Protection	31st
=== Department of Social Protection 2020–present ===
Name	Term of office		Party	Responsibilities	Government
Damien English	19 July 2020	12 January 2023	Fine Gael	Employment Affairs and Retail Business	32nd • 33rd
Neale Richmond	13 January 2023	10 April 2024	Fine Gael	Employment Affairs and Retail Business	32nd • 33rd
Joe O'Brien	19 July 2020	23 January 2025	Green	Community Development and Charities	32nd • 33rd • 34th
Emer Higgins	10 April 2024	23 January 2025	Fine Gael	Business, Employment and Retail	34th
