= Tomás Ó Raghallaigh =

Irish language academic and writer (1881–1966)

Tomás Ó Raghallaigh (1881-1966) was an Irish language academic and writer.

O Raghallaigh was born in Leitir Fhraoigh (Loughwell), near Maigh Cuilinn Moycullen, Co. Galway in May 1883 to Máire Ní Loideáin from Spiddal and Seán Ó Raghallaigh. His large family spoke Irish at home. He attended primary school in Leitir Fhraoigh went to St. Joseph's in Galway and then to St Patrick's College, Dublin where he trained to become a teacher. He taught in Dublin initially, Carlow and then Achill, in national schools of Achill Sound, Saula, Dooagh and Dookinella. He encountered resistance to teaching Irish. He helped establish Scoil Acla in Dooagh, a traditional Irish music summer school, which he also named. He met his wife there - Máire Sineád Ní Challanáin, a teacher; they had five children. In 1911 he got a job as a muinteoir taistil (a travelling teacher for Conradh na Gaeilge (the Gaelic League)) in Mayo.

He travelled across Ireland to gain support for Irish language revival. A colleague of Douglas Hyde, he became an organiser for the Galway Gaelic League and spread its influence in the west of Ireland in the early 20th century. He was appointed a lecturer in Irish at University College Galway (UCG) and helped develop Irish in the college curriculum. He authored many pamphlets and articles in Irish and was a regular contributor to An Stoc, the Irish monthly paper, which he edited with Tomas Ó Maille. With Pádraig Ó Domhnalláin, he wrote a series of short stories which were published under the title Bruth-Fa-Thiar. He later became Professor of Irish at UCG, retiring in 1952. He was the father of Padraic O Raghallaigh, first Ceannaire of RTÉ Raidió na Gaeltachta, the Irish-language radio station.

He died aged 84 in Castleblakeney, Co. Galway.

== Select bibliography ==
- An Saoil Gaedhilge, Gallimh, O’Gorman, 1927.
- Eachdhoun an Air
- Maigin Aisti
- Guth na Gaodhltachta, no comrade do chach, with Muiris Ó Cathain, Baile Átha Cliath, Comhlucht Oideachais na hEireann, 1923
