= Pádhraic Ó Domhnalláin =

Irish duellist

Pádhraic Ó Domhnalláin (fl. 1830) was an Irish duellist.

== Outline ==
Ó Domhnalláin was the eponymous subject of a poem by Antoine Ó Raifteirí, concerning a duel he fought, which is believed to have been one of the last, if not the last, ever fought in County Galway, once notorious for such events.

== Circumstances ==
Ó Domhnalláin was from Balleighter or Ballydonnellan. He was a good friend with Patrick Callanan of Skycur but a dispute arose one night during a party at Callanan's house. Ó Domhnalláin initially did not wish to attend as he did not have suitable clothes, but Callanan loaned him something suitable.

== Causes of the duel ==
During the party, Ó Domhnalláin made advances towards a good-looking young blonde woman, who was Callanan's lover. Words were exchanged between the two men, and a challenge for a duel was issued. They agreed to meet in Madden's field at Belview. Both arrived at the appointed time with two large crowds of followers. Callanan was recorded as being in a good mood because he had a well-earned reputation as a marksman.

== The duel ==
Just before the duel was to start, a nervous Ó Domhnalláin attempted to make up with Callanan, who very bluntly refused. The men were placed some twenty to thirty yards apart and the ring of the signal bell, both fired. It was Ó Domhnalláin, however, who proved to have the greater speed and agility and fired first. Callanan dropped to the ground and died immediately.

== Afterwards ==
Raifteiri composed a ballad on the event congratulating Ó Domhnalláin, in a tone that suggests the poem was seeking favour from him.

The identity and fate of Callanan's lover is unknown.

== Ancestry ==
He was a descendant of King Dluthach mac Fithcheallach of Ui Maine.

== See also ==
- Flann Óge Ó Domhnalláin, chief poet of Connacht, died 1342.
- Padraig Ó Domhnallain, short story writer, born 1884.
- John Donnellan, former Irish politician and sportsperson, born 1937.
