= James Kelly (Fianna Fáil politician) =

Irish politician

Teachta Dála
- In office July 1937 – June 1943
- Constituency: Meath–Westmeath
- In office February 1932 – July 1937
- Constituency: Meath

Personal details
- Born: County Meath, Ireland
- Party: Fianna Fáil

James Patrick Kelly was an Irish Fianna Fáil politician who served for eleven years as a Teachta Dála (TD) from 1932 to 1943.

An accountant by profession, Kelly first stood as a candidate for Dáil Éireann at the June 1927 general election for the Meath constituency, but was not successful. He was defeated again at the September 1927 general election, but was elected at the 1932 general election, taking his seat in the 7th Dáil. He was re-elected for the same constituency at the 1933 general election, and for the new Meath–Westmeath constituency at the 1937 general election.

He was returned again at the 1938 general election, but lost his seat at the 1943 general election. He stood again the following year at the 1944 general election, but was not successful.

Dáil	Election	Deputy (Party)	Deputy (Party)	Deputy (Party)
4th	1923	Patrick Mulvany (FP)	David Hall (Lab)	Eamonn Duggan (CnaG)
5th	1927 (Jun)	Matthew O'Reilly (FF)	David Hall (Lab)	Eamonn Duggan (CnaG)
6th	1927 (Sep)	Matthew O'Reilly (FF)	Arthur Matthews (CnaG)	Eamonn Duggan (CnaG)
7th	1932	James Kelly (FF)	Arthur Matthews (CnaG)	Eamonn Duggan (CnaG)
8th	1933	James Kelly (FF)	Robert Davitt (CnaG)	Matthew O'Reilly (FF)
9th	1937	Constituency abolished. See Meath–Westmeath		

Dáil	Election	Deputy (Party)	Deputy (Party)	Deputy (Party)	Deputy (Party)	Deputy (Party)
13th	1948	Matthew O'Reilly (FF)	Michael Hilliard (FF)	3 seats until 1977	Patrick Giles (FG)	3 seats until 1977
14th	1951	Matthew O'Reilly (FF)	Michael Hilliard (FF)	3 seats until 1977	Patrick Giles (FG)	3 seats until 1977
15th	1954	James Tully (Lab)	Michael Hilliard (FF)	3 seats until 1977	Patrick Giles (FG)	3 seats until 1977
16th	1957	James Griffin (FF)	Michael Hilliard (FF)	3 seats until 1977	Patrick Giles (FG)	3 seats until 1977
16th	1959 by-election	Henry Johnston (FF)	Michael Hilliard (FF)	3 seats until 1977	Patrick Giles (FG)	3 seats until 1977
17th	1961	James Tully (Lab)	Michael Hilliard (FF)	3 seats until 1977	Denis Farrelly (FG)	3 seats until 1977
18th	1965	James Tully (Lab)	Michael Hilliard (FF)	3 seats until 1977	Denis Farrelly (FG)	3 seats until 1977
19th	1969	James Tully (Lab)	Michael Hilliard (FF)	3 seats until 1977	John Bruton (FG)	3 seats until 1977
20th	1973	James Tully (Lab)	Brendan Crinion (FF)	3 seats until 1977	John Bruton (FG)	3 seats until 1977
21st	1977	James Tully (Lab)	Brendan Crinion (FF)	Jim Fitzsimons (FF)	John Bruton (FG)	4 seats 1977–1981
22nd	1981	James Tully (Lab)	Brendan Crinion (FF)	Jim Fitzsimons (FF)	John Bruton (FG)	John V. Farrelly (FG)
23rd	1982 (Feb)	Michael Lynch (FF)	Colm Hilliard (FF)	Jim Fitzsimons (FF)	John Bruton (FG)	John V. Farrelly (FG)
24th	1982 (Nov)	Frank McLoughlin (Lab)	Colm Hilliard (FF)	Jim Fitzsimons (FF)	John Bruton (FG)	John V. Farrelly (FG)
25th	1987	Michael Lynch (FF)	Colm Hilliard (FF)	Noel Dempsey (FF)	John Bruton (FG)	John V. Farrelly (FG)
26th	1989	Mary Wallace (FF)	Colm Hilliard (FF)	Noel Dempsey (FF)	John Bruton (FG)	John V. Farrelly (FG)
27th	1992	Mary Wallace (FF)	Colm Hilliard (FF)	Noel Dempsey (FF)	John Bruton (FG)	Brian Fitzgerald (Lab)
28th	1997	Mary Wallace (FF)	Johnny Brady (FF)	Noel Dempsey (FF)	John Bruton (FG)	John V. Farrelly (FG)
29th	2002	Mary Wallace (FF)	Johnny Brady (FF)	Noel Dempsey (FF)	John Bruton (FG)	Damien English (FG)
29th	2005 by-election	Mary Wallace (FF)	Johnny Brady (FF)	Noel Dempsey (FF)	Shane McEntee (FG)	Damien English (FG)
30th	2007	Constituency abolished. See Meath East and Meath West				

Dáil	Election	Deputy (Party)	Deputy (Party)	Deputy (Party)	Deputy (Party)	Deputy (Party)
9th	1937	Matthew O'Reilly (FF)	Michael Kennedy (FF)	James Kelly (FF)	Charles Fagan (FG)	Patrick Giles (FG)
10th	1938	Matthew O'Reilly (FF)	Michael Kennedy (FF)	James Kelly (FF)	Charles Fagan (FG)	Patrick Giles (FG)
11th	1943	Matthew O'Reilly (FF)	Michael Kennedy (FF)	Michael Hilliard (FF)	Charles Fagan (FG)	Patrick Giles (FG)
12th	1944	Matthew O'Reilly (FF)	Michael Kennedy (FF)	Michael Hilliard (FF)	Charles Fagan (FG)	Patrick Giles (FG)
13th	1948	Constituency abolished. See Meath and Longford–Westmeath				
