= Ainglioch Ó Dónalláin =

Irish poet

Ainglioch Ó Dónalláin, Irish poet, fl. mid-14th or mid-15th century.

== Origins ==
Ó Dónalláin was a member of a minor family of bards based at Ballydonnellan, Loughrea, County Galway, in what was then the kingdom of Uí Maine. Their pedigree is given in Leabhar Uí Maine:

gave their descent as

Domnallan mac Maelbrigdi, mic Grenain, mic Loingsich, mic Domnallain, mic Bresail, mic Dluthaig, mic Fithchellaig, mic Dicholla, mic Eogain Find.

Domnallain mac Maelbrigdi was alive about the reign of King Muirgus mac Domnaill (973-986).

An alternative term for them and their associated families was Clan Breasail, indicating their joint descent from Breasail mac Dluthaig.

The original castle was said to have been built in 936, and was rebuilt after a fire in 1412.

== Cuige Connacht ==
Ó Dónalláin is known from a single extant poem of 192 verses, Cuige Connacht, in praise of Aedh Mac Diarmata (MacDermot) of Moylurg. This is either Aedh Mac Diarmata (reigned 1368–1393) or Aedh mac Diarmata, (1458–1465).

O'Reilly specifically states that he was a poet to the MacDermots.

== See also ==
- Nehemiah Donnellan (1560–1610), Archbishop of Tuam.
- Sir James Donnellan (fl. 1607–1665.
- Michael Donnellan (1900–1964), Clann na Talmhan politician.
