= Pat Donnellan =

Irish Gaelic footballer (born 1941)

Personal information
- Native name: Pádraig Ó Dónalláin (Irish)
- Born: 1941 (age 84–85) Dunmore, County Galway
- Height: 5 ft 8 in (173 cm)

Sport
- Sport: Gaelic football
- Position: Midfield
Club
- Years: Club
- 1950s-1970s: Dunmore McHales
Club titles
- Galway titles: 6
Inter-county
- Years: County
- 1960-1967: Galway
Inter-county titles
- Connacht titles: 4
- All-Irelands: 2
- NFL: 1

Pat Donnellan (born 1941 in Dunmore, County Galway) is an Irish former sportsperson. He played Gaelic football with his local club Dunmore McHales and was a member of the Galway senior inter-county team from 1960 until 1967.

Donnellan is a member of a famous football dynasty from Galway. His father, Michael Donnellan, won an All-Ireland medal with Galway in 1925. Donnellan's brother, John, captained Galway to the All-Ireland title in 1964. His nephew, Michael Donnellan, won All-Ireland medals with Galway in 1998 and 2001.

== See also ==
- Domnallan mac Maelbrigdi, from whom the surname Donnellan derives.
