= Andrea Donnellan =

American scientist

- Education: California Institute of Technology, Ohio State University, University of Southern California
- Employers: California State Polytechnic University, Pomona (2018–2019); Jet Propulsion Laboratory (1993–)
- Awards: Presidential Early Career Award for Scientists and Engineers (1996); Fellow of the American Association for the Advancement of Science (2020); Fellow of the American Geophysical Union (2021)

Andrea Donnellan is a principal investigator at the Jet Propulsion Laboratory. She studies earthquakes using geodetic imaging.

== Biography ==
She studied at Ohio State University, University of Southern California, and California Institute of Technology. Graduated in Geology with honours and distinction in geology and minor in math.

In 1996, she was a recipient of a Presidential Early Career Award for Scientists and Engineers From 1998 to 2015, she taught at the University of Southern California. She teaches at California State Polytechnic University, Pomona.

She is a member of the editorial board of the Earth and Space Science journal.

As of January 2025, Donnellan has left JPL, and has taken over as the Department Head of Earth, Atmospheric, and Planetary Sciences at Purdue University.

== Most cited publications ==
- Tralli, D.M., Blom, R.G., Zlotnicki, V., Donnellan, A. and Evans, D.L., 2005. Satellite remote sensing of earthquake, volcano, flood, landslide and coastal inundation hazards. ISPRS Journal of Photogrammetry and Remote Sensing, 59(4), pp.185-198. According to Google Scholar, this article has been cited 473 times.
- Feigl, K.L., Agnew, D.C., Bock, Y., Dong, D., Donnellan, A., Hager, B.H., Herring, T.A., Jackson, D.D., Jordan, T.H., King, R.W. and Larsen, S., 1993. Space geodetic measurement of crustal deformation in central and southern California, 1984–1992. Journal of Geophysical Research: Solid Earth, 98(B12), pp.21677-21712. According to Google Scholar, this article has been cited 342 times.
- Wei S, Avouac JP, Hudnut KW, Donnellan A, Parker JW, Graves RW, Helmberger D, Fielding E, Liu Z, Cappa F, Eneva M. The 2012 Brawley swarm triggered by injection-induced aseismic slip. Earth and Planetary Science Letters. 2015 Jul 15;422:115-25. According to Google Scholar, this article has been cited 94 times.
- Holliday JR, Chen CC, Tiampo KF, Rundle JB, Turcotte DL, Donnellan A. A RELM earthquake forecast based on pattern informatics. Seismological Research Letters. 2007 Jan 1;78(1):87-93. According to Google Scholar, this article has been cited 93 times.
