= Leigh Donnellan =

Australia international rugby union player

- Full name: Leigh Gerard Donnellan
- Born: 3 November 1957 (age 69) Canberra, ACT, Australia
- School: Daramalan College

Rugby union career
- Position: Prop
International career
Years	Team	Apps	(Points)
1989	Australia		

Leigh Gerard Donnellan (born 3 November 1957) is an Australian former rugby union player.

A Canberra native, Donnellan was educated at Daramalan College and spent his entire career with the local Daramalan Rugby Club, while earning regular ACT representative honours. He appeared for the ACT against the touring 1979 All Blacks and in 1982 captained the territory against Scotland. In 1984, Donnellan had the distinction of captaining Daramalan to their maiden first-grade premiership.

Donnellan won Wallabies selection in 1989, to back up props Dan Crowley and Mark Hartill for the second Test match against the British & Irish Lions at Ballymore Stadium, but didn't get to take the field. He was again restricted to the bench for the series finale in Sydney and lost his place to Tony Daly thereafter.
