= Flann Óge Ó Domhnalláin =

14th century Irish poet

Flann Óge Ó Domhnalláin (died 1342) was Chief Poet of Connacht.

Ó Domhnalláin was a member of an Irish family of Bards, originally located in Ballydonnellan, County Galway. A sept of the Uí Maine called Clann Breasail, they held the position of "Cathmhaol" or Battle Champion.

His ancestry is given as "Domnallan mac Maelbrigdi mic Grenain mic Loingsich mic Domnallain mic Bresail mic Dluthaig mic Fithchellaig mic Dicholla mic Eogain Find", with Domnallan mac Maelbrigdi been the ancestor from whom the surname Ó Domhnalláin is derived.

Ó Domhnalláin is recorded as "ollamh Connacht i n-dán", or chief poet of Connacht, in his obituary in the Annals of the Four Masters. This indicates that his work was considered to be the very highest standard among his generation of poets in the province, yet none of his work is known to have survived.

Descendants of the Uí Domhnalláin are still found in Galway and Roscommon under the surname Donnellan.

He was a descendant of King Dluthach mac Fithcheallach of Ui Maine.

== See also ==
- Ó Dálaigh
- Mac Con Midhe

Preceded by Amlaid Ua Domhnalláin	Ollamh of Connacht ?–1342	Succeeded by ?
