= Nehemiah Donnellan (1649–1705) =

Irish judge

Nehemiah Donnellan (1649 – 25 December 1705) was an Irish lawyer and judge.

== Early life ==
He was the son of Sir James Donnellan, Chief Justice of the Irish Common Pleas, and grandson of Nehemiah Donnellan, Archbishop of Tuam and Elizabeth O'Donnell. His mother was Sarah Wheeler, daughter of Jonas Wheeler, Bishop of Ossory and his wife Martha Tucker; Sarah was the widow of Mathew Tyrrell, Mayor of Dublin.

He graduated from Trinity College Dublin in 1666. Although he had originally intended to become a soldier, he resolved on a legal career instead, and entered Middle Temple in 1669. He seems to have been an exceptionally unruly student: he was fined for breaking down the doors of the Temple and for gambling at Christmas.

He was called to the Irish Bar about 1672 and became Commissioner of Revenue Appeals in 1677. After the Revolution of 1688 he and his mother and his children lived for a time in England.

He was appointed Prime Serjeant on 29 December 1692 and represented the borough of Galway Town in the Irish House of Commons from 1692 to 1693. In 1693 he was made Recorder of Dublin.

== Judge ==
He was raised to the High Court bench as a Puisne Baron of the Irish Court of Exchequer in 1695, and on 31 December 1696 was made one of the Commissioners of the Great Seal of Ireland, pending the appointment of John Methuen as Lord Chancellor of Ireland in 1697. He became Chief Baron of the Exchequer on 27 December 1703, holding the office until his death. His elevation to the Bench was said to be part of an effort to remove judges who were suspected of Tory or pro-Catholic views; but it is surprising that Donnellan, who was a descendant of an Old Irish, Gaelic-speaking family which had several Roman Catholic members, was not suspected of Catholic sympathies himself. As regards his political beliefs, Ball suggests rather cynically that he had found it expedient to change them, and that he was no more convinced a Whig than he had been a Tory.

In 1698 the Irish-born writer and publisher John Dunton, on a visit to Dublin, gave a favourable verdict on the Irish judiciary, including Donnellan: "men whose reputation is such that no one complains of them".

== Family ==
He married twice; little is known of his first wife, who died before 1688, leaving one surviving son, James, and a daughter. He remarried Martha Ussher, daughter of Christopher Ussher, who outlived him by many years (they are said to have become estranged), and married secondly Phillip Perceval, brother of the 1st Earl of Egmont. Nehemiah and Martha had two sons, Nehemiah, MP for County Tipperary, and Christopher, and two daughters, Katherine and Anne (died 1762).

His daughter Anne is remembered today as the friend of the leading Irish writers of her time, and for founding the Donnellan Lectures at Trinity College Dublin.

Her sister Katherine married Robert Clayton, Bishop of Cork and Ross. The artist and letter-writer Mary Delaney wrote an unflattering sketch of Katherine as "giving herself the airs of a Queen" after her husband was made a bishop. She may well have come to regret his promotion, as his religious opinions were so unorthodox as to raise doubts as to whether he was a Christian at all. Horace Walpole said unkindly that Clayton's writings seemed calculated to destroy anyone's Christian faith, and it seems that only his sudden death in 1758 averted an inquiry by his fellow bishops into charges of heresy against him.

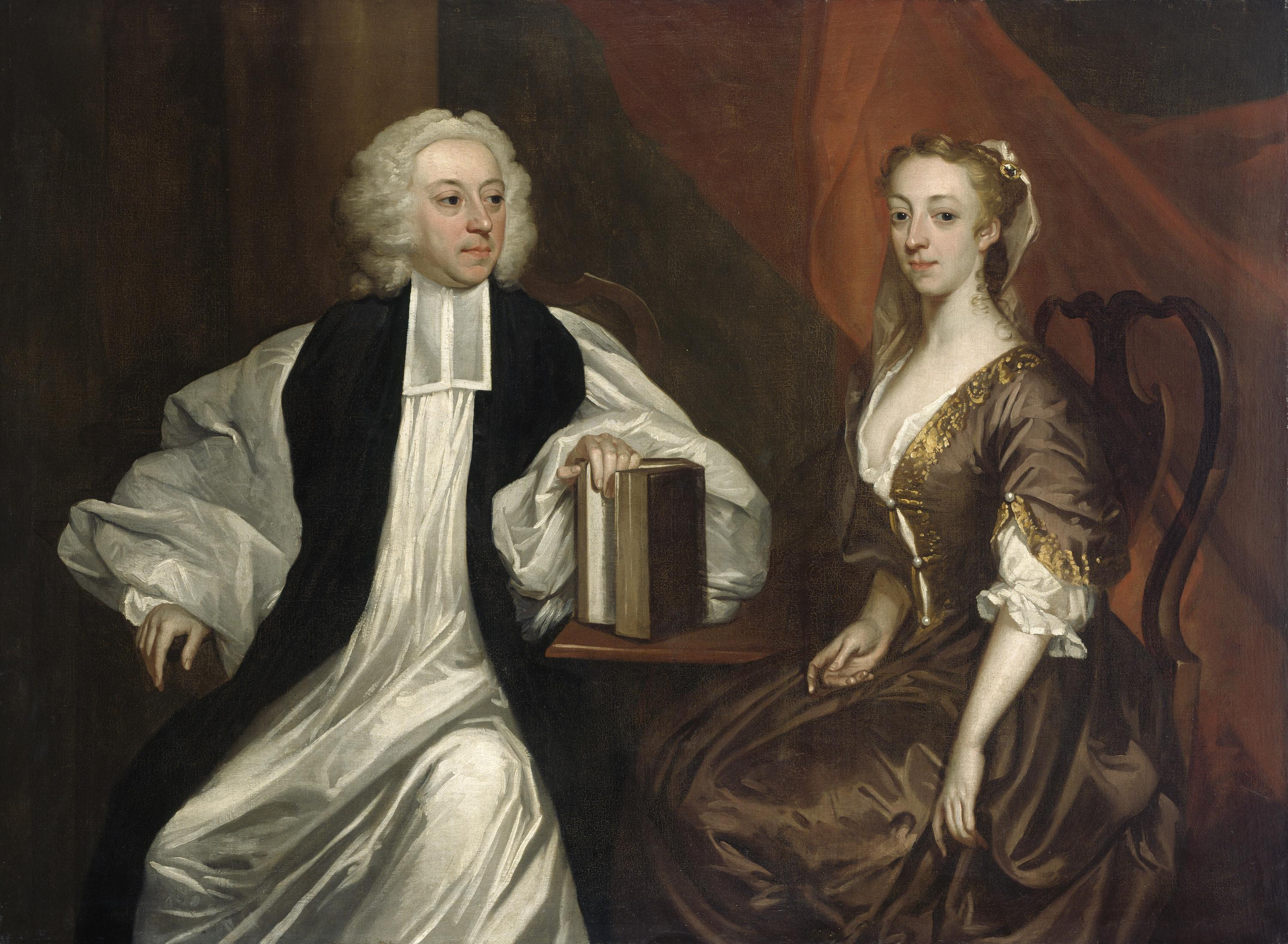
Portrait of Robert Clayton, Bishop of Cork and Ross, and his wife Katherine, daughter of Nehemiah Donnellan
