= Martin Donnellan =

Recipient of the Scott Medal

Martin Donnellan, Garda Síochána Detective Sergeant 17179D and recipient of the Scott Medal, born 1948.

Donnellan was born at Ballymoe, County Galway, on 7 June 1948. He had been a cabinet maker prior to joining the force.

== Stillorgan bank raid ==
Donnellan was one of six Gardaí awarded the Scott Medal in recognition of their actions on 30 December 1980.

Four heavily armed men robbed a bank at Stillorgan Shopping Centre, Dublin, escaping to a van, driven by a fifth man, with £102,000. Off-duty Gardaí Keeley made an effort to note the van's registration but was fired upon. He returned fire. With most of south Dublin's mobile units in pursuit, the high-speed chase "ended dramatically at Carrickmines Cross."

"The raiders, realizing that their aged van was never going to outdistance the powerful Garda patrol car, stopped out of sight of the pursuing detectives [Daly and Curran] and set up a hastily-prepared ambush. Their car was savagely raked with bullets and both men severely injured. The robbers then continued in their flight."

Abandoning the van and hi-jacking a car, they made their way into the Dublin Mountains where they crashed the car. As they hijacked another car, they were discovered by Detective Doyle, who was joined by Donnellan and Brennan.

"Realizing that the raiders could scarcely head back towards Dublin, the three detectives used their cars to block the narrow road. The robbers in their stolen Datsun appeared within seconds and stopped a few yards from the improvised roadblock. The three detectives took cover, Doyle pointing his pistol while Donnellan and Brennan pointed cupped hands to give the impression that they were also armed. Panic now seized the raiders. In a frenzied attempt to reverse out of the situation they slid into a drain and overturned. They then tried to escape on foot as the intrepid detectives closed in, Doyle firing first a warning shot over the raiders' heads and firing again when it seemed that fire might be returned. One raider was wounded and two others then gave up the struggle. The remaining two made good their escape."

Donnellan and his colleague, Kieran Brennan, were awarded the Scott Medal at Templemore in 1982, sharing the ceremony with the widows of three Gardaí killed in action - John Morley, Henry Burns, and Seamus Quaid (see Deaths of Garda officers (1980). On his retirement he described the event as " .. chilling. It was stressful looking at those families. I remember in particular Henry Burns' kids were so small. It really brought it home to me. It was lovely to be honoured, but it was even better to be in the good health to receive it. It is a very thin line between life and death, and that's the one thing about the gardai, there is no group in the country that has paid as big a price."

== Later career ==
While later working as a detective superintendent, Donnellan led the investigation into the murder of 17-year-old Raonaid Murray in Glenageary (her killer has never been found) and worked on case of Annie McCarrick, who disappeared without trace in 1993. He aided the investigation into the murder of former prime minister Rafik Hariri in 2005 in Beirut.

He retired in summer 2008.

== See also ==
- Yvonne Burke (Garda)
- Brian Connaughton
- Michael J. Reynolds
- Joseph Scott
- Deaths of Henry Byrne and John Morley (1980)
- Death of Jerry McCabe (1996)
