= James Donnellan =

Irish lawyer and politician

Sir James Donnellan (c. 1588 – 1665) was an Irish lawyer and politician, who became Chief Justice of the Irish Common Pleas in 1660. He was unusual among the Irish judges of the time in being of Gaelic descent, and more remarkable in that his service as a judge under Oliver Cromwell did not disqualify him from service after the Restoration of Charles II.

== Personal life ==
He was the third son of Nehemiah Donnellan, Archbishop of Tuam, and his wife Elizabeth O'Donnell. He married firstly Anne Barry, sister of James Barry, 1st Baron Barry of Santry and secondly Sarah Wheeler, daughter of Jonas Wheeler, Bishop of Ossory and Martha Tucker, and widow of Matthew Tyrrell. By Sarah, he was the father of Nehemiah Donnellan, Chief Baron of the Irish Exchequer and also of several daughters.

Nemehiah Donnellan was the father of Anne Donnellan, who founded the Donnellan lectures in Trinity College Dublin, and Katherine Donnellan, who married Robert Clayton, Bishop of Cork and Ross. James's principal residence was Rathswire, County Westmeath. He is buried in Christchurch Cathedral, Dublin.

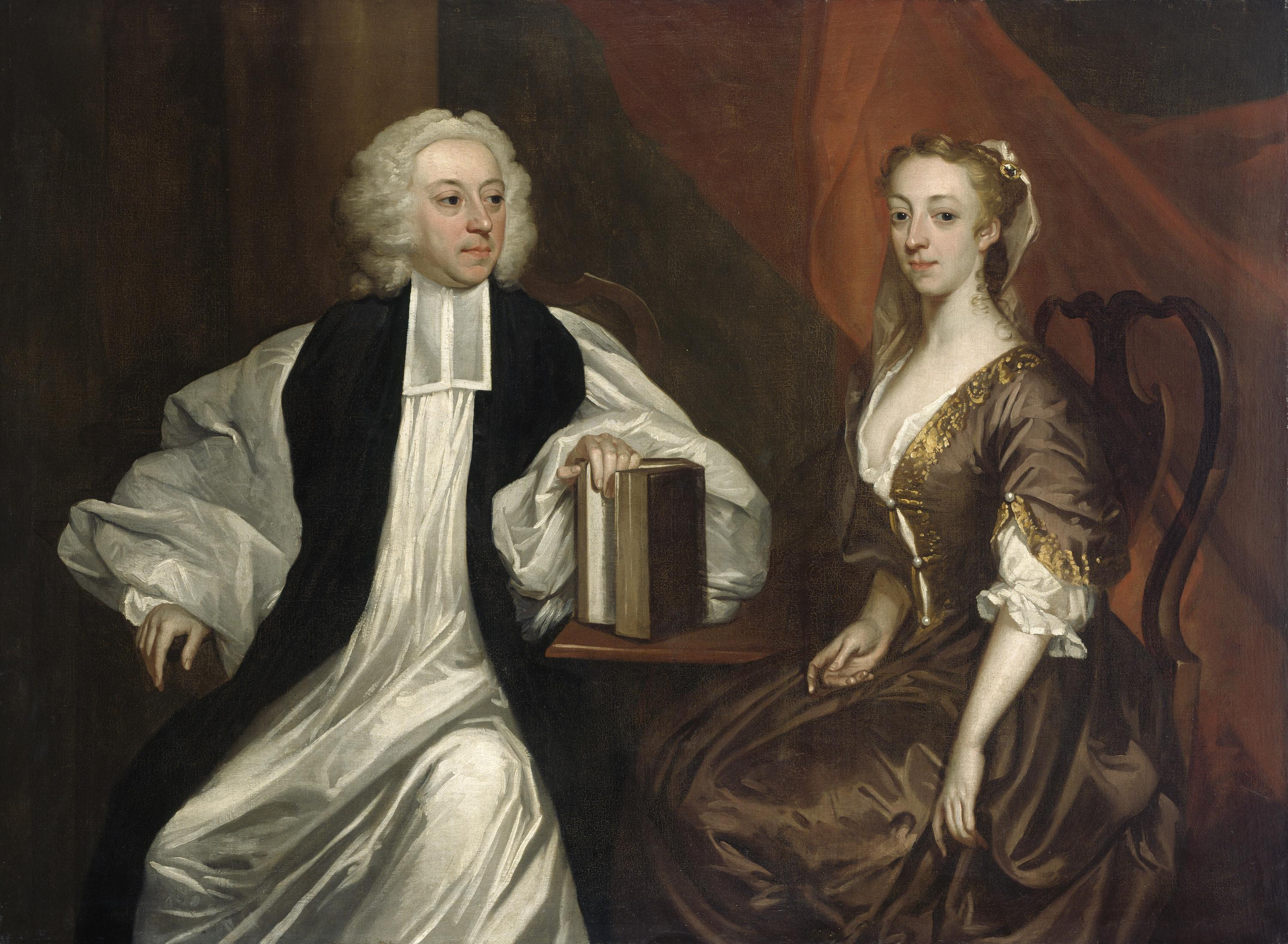
Portrait c.1740 of Robert and Katherine Clayton by James Latham: Katherine Clayton (née Donnellan) was James Donnellan's granddaughter

== Education ==
He had a distinguished career at Trinity College Dublin which he was later to represent in the Irish House of Commons. He was a scholar in 1607, Bachelor of Arts in 1610, Fellow in 1612 and Master of Arts in 1613.

He entered Lincoln's Inn in 1616 and was called to the Bar in 1623. He entered the King's Inn the same year and was Treasurer in 1639.

== Career ==
He was elected to the House of Commons in 1634. In 1627 he became third justice of Connacht and was promoted to the office of Chief Justice of Connacht in 1634. He owed the promotion to the goodwill of the Lord Deputy of Ireland, the Earl of Strafford, who hoped, rather cynically, to appease the Old Irish faction by appointing a few "token" judges of Gaelic origin. He became a judge of the High Court in 1637, being made third justice of the Court of Common Pleas (Ireland).

== Civil War ==
When the English Civil War broke out Donnellan was initially a Royalist; he had long been close to Ulick Burke, 5th Earl of Clanricarde in whom Charles I placed great trust. The King summoned Donnellan to Oxford to treat with the Irish Confederacy.

After the defeat of the Royalist cause, according to Henry Cromwell, Donnellan became a faithful supporter of the new regime, diligently persecuting his former allies. He was one of four commissioners appointed to administrate justice in Leinster in 1651. He served on the High Court of Justice in 1653, and returned to the Court of Common Pleas as its second Justice in 1655.

== Chief Justice ==
On the face of it Donnellan's loyal service to Cromwell, combined with his Gaelic origins, should have debarred him from judicial office, especially one of the four highest offices, at the Restoration of Charles II. James Butler, 1st Duke of Ormonde, the Lord Lieutenant of Ireland, who personally chose the new judges, had no strong objection to men of Gaelic background, but did normally require a record of loyalty to the Crown.

Ball suggests that while Donnellan's first wife Anne had been dead for many years he was still on friendly terms with her brother Lord Santry, now to be appointed Lord Chief Justice of Ireland, who used his influence on Donnellan's behalf. Donnellan was restored to Royal favour, made Chief Justice of the Common Pleas, knighted and made a member of the Privy Council of Ireland in 1660.

He was, for the time, a very old man, and his health quickly failed: well before his death the English Government was thinking of replacing him, but Ormonde requested that they wait till he was actually dead. In the event he was still in office when he died in 1665.
