= Pádraig Ó Domhnalláin =

Pádraig Ó Domhnalláin, Irish short story writer, born 1884.

Born at Oughterard in 1884, he became a member of the Gaelic League in the early 1900s, and was a local organiser. He and Colm de Bhailís assisted Patrick Pearse during his time at Rosmuck, in collecting poems and songs of the region. His own short-stories were written in collaboration with Tomás Ó Raghallaigh and called Bruth-Fa-Thiar. He also translated Chekhov and Merimee into Irish.

== Select bibliography ==
- Conamara, Baile Ath Cliath, Mac Ghuill, 1925
- Oidhre an Leighinn agus aisti eile, Baile Ath Cliath, Mac Ghuil, 1925
- Tacar Amhrain, P.Do Domhnallain do dhioghluim agus do chuir le cheile, Dublin, Gill, 1925.
- Sgealta Eorpacha, Dublin, Gill, 1927.
- Ar Lorg an Ri agus scealta eile, Baile Ath Claith, Mac Ghuill, 1934
- Bruth-Fa-Thiar, Baile Ath Cliath, Mac Ghuill, 1935.
- Drecachta, Baile Ath Claith, Foilseachain an Rialtais, 1935.
