= John Donnellan =

Irish politician and sportsman (born 1937)

Minister of State
- 1983–1987: Health
- 1983–1987: Social Welfare
- 1982–1983: Posts and Telegraphs
- 1982–1983: Transport

Teachta Dála
- In office June 1981 – June 1989
- Constituency: Galway West
- In office June 1969 – June 1977
- Constituency: Galway North-East
- In office June 1977 – June 1981
- In office December 1964 – June 1969
- Constituency: Galway East

Personal details
- Born: 27 March 1937 (age 89) County Galway, Ireland
- Party: Fine Gael
- Parent: Michael Donnellan (father)

John F. Donnellan (born 27 March 1937) is an Irish former politician and sportsman. He served as a Fine Gael Teachta Dála (TD) for twenty-five years and as a Minister of State from 1982 to 1987. He played Gaelic football for his local club Dunmore McHales and at senior level for the Galway county team in the 1960s.

== Early and private life ==
John Donnellan was born in Dunmore, County Galway in 1937. He was born into a family that had strong interests in both Gaelic games and Irish politics. His father, Michael Donnellan, had won an All-Ireland Senior Football Championship (SFC) medal with Galway in 1925, later becoming a TD for Clann na Talmhan. John Donnellan would go on to follow in his father's footsteps in both of these pursuits, although for a different party. John's son, Michael, would also go on to play football for Galway, winning All-Ireland SFC medals in 1998 and 2001.

== Playing career ==
John Donnellan
Sport
- Sport: Gaelic Football
- Position: Right half back
Club
- Years: Club
- Dunmore McHales
Club titles
- Galway titles: 4
- Connacht titles: 2
Inter-county
- Years: County
- 1960s: Galway
Inter-county titles
- Connacht titles: 6
- All-Irelands: 3

=== Club ===
Donnellan played his club football with the Dunmore McHales club in the north of County Galway. He enjoyed much success with the club, beginning in 1961 when he won a senior county championship for the first time. In 1962 Donnellan won a county league medal before claiming a second county championship title in 1963. This last win was later converted into a Connacht club football championship. In 1966 Donnellan's club completed the double of county league and county championship victories. He completed a great run of success by capturing back-to-back county championship and Connacht club titles in 1968 and 1969.

=== Inter-county ===
Donnellan's career as an inter-county footballer began in the late 1950s. He won an All-Ireland Junior Football Championship title with the Galway junior team in 1958 and he quickly joined the senior side. Two years later in 1960 Donnellan won his first Connacht title; however, Galway were later defeated in the All-Ireland SFC semi-final. Three years later in 1963 he captured a second provincial title; however on that occasion Dublin defeated the men from the west in the All-Ireland SFC final. In 1964 Donnellan was appointed captain of the Galway team. That year he won a third Connacht title before leading his team out in the All-Ireland final against Kerry. Galway were victorious on that day by five points and Donnellan captured his first All-Ireland SFC medal. His moment of triumph was short-lived as, shortly after hoisting the Sam Maguire Cup, he learned that his father Michael had died in the Hogan Stand shortly before the start of the second-half.

In 1965 Donnellan added a fourth provincial medal to his collection. In the subsequent All-Ireland final against Kerry he was sent off but Galway were still victorious, giving Donnellan a second consecutive All-Ireland medal. The following year he won a fifth Connacht Championship title before qualifying for a fourth consecutive All-Ireland final appearance. Galway had a six-point win over Meath, thus giving Donnellan a third consecutive All-Ireland SFC medal and establishing that Galway team as one of the greatest of all time. In 1967 he won a Railway Cup medal with Connacht before winning a sixth and final provincial medal in 1968. Donnellan retired from inter-county football shortly after.

== Political career ==
Donnellan's father Michael died suddenly in September 1964, and at the resulting by-election in December John was elected to Dáil Éireann as a Fine Gael TD for the Galway East constituency. He was successful at the next eight general elections, with changes of constituency; to Galway North-East in 1969, back to Galway East in 1977, and from 1981 to 1989 for Galway West.

In December 1982, he was appointed by Garret FitzGerald as Minister of State at the Department of Posts and Telegraphs and Minister of State at the Department of Transport. In 1983, he was reassigned as Minister of State at the Department of Health and Minister of State at the Department of Social Welfare with special responsibility for public health and social welfare information. He served until Fine Gael left office after the 1987 general election.

In April 1988, following criticism of party leader Alan Dukes, Donnellan was expelled from the parliamentary party. Donnellan retired from politics at the 1989 general election.

== See also ==
- Families in the Oireachtas

Gaelic games
Preceded by Des Foley (Dublin)	All-Ireland SFC winning captain 1964	Succeeded by Enda Colleran (Galway)
Political offices
Preceded by Terry Leyden	Minister of State at the Department of Posts and Telegraphs; 1982–1983; With: Ted Nealon (from Feb. 1983)	Succeeded by Ted Nealon as Minister of State at the Department of Communications (from Jan. 1984)
Preceded by Terry Leyden	Minister of State at the Department of Transport; 1982–1983	Succeeded by Ted Nealon as Minister of State at the Department of Communications (from Jan. 1984)
Preceded by Fergus O'Brien	Minister of State at the Department of Health; 1983–1987	Succeeded by Terry Leyden
Preceded by Fergus O'Brien	Minister of State at the Department of Social Welfare; 1983–1987; With: Séamus Pattison	Position vacant

Dáil	Election	Deputy (Party)	Deputy (Party)	Deputy (Party)	Deputy (Party)
9th	1937	Frank Fahy (FF)	Mark Killilea Snr (FF)	Patrick Beegan (FF)	Seán Broderick (FG)
10th	1938	Frank Fahy (FF)	Mark Killilea Snr (FF)	Patrick Beegan (FF)	Seán Broderick (FG)
11th	1943	Frank Fahy (FF)	Mark Killilea Snr (FF)	Patrick Beegan (FF)	Michael Donnellan (CnaT)
12th	1944	Frank Fahy (FF)	Mark Killilea Snr (FF)	Patrick Beegan (FF)	Michael Donnellan (CnaT)
13th	1948	Constituency abolished. See Galway North and Galway South			

Dáil	Election	Deputy (Party)	Deputy (Party)	Deputy (Party)	Deputy (Party)	Deputy (Party)
17th	1961	Michael F. Kitt (FF)	Anthony Millar (FF)	Michael Carty (FF)	Michael Donnellan (CnaT)	Brigid Hogan-O'Higgins (FG)
17th	1964 by-election	Michael F. Kitt (FF)	Anthony Millar (FF)	Michael Carty (FF)	John Donnellan (FG)	Brigid Hogan-O'Higgins (FG)
18th	1965	Michael F. Kitt (FF)	Anthony Millar (FF)	Michael Carty (FF)	John Donnellan (FG)	Brigid Hogan-O'Higgins (FG)
19th	1969	Constituency abolished. See Galway North-East and Clare–South Galway				

Dáil	Election	Deputy (Party)	Deputy (Party)	Deputy (Party)	Deputy (Party)
21st	1977	Johnny Callanan (FF)	Thomas Hussey (FF)	Mark Killilea Jnr (FF)	John Donnellan (FG)
22nd	1981	Johnny Callanan (FF)	Michael P. Kitt (FF)	Paul Connaughton Snr (FG)	3 seats 1981–1997
23rd	1982 (Feb)	Johnny Callanan (FF)	Michael P. Kitt (FF)	Paul Connaughton Snr (FG)	3 seats 1981–1997
23rd	1982 by-election	Noel Treacy (FF)	Michael P. Kitt (FF)	Paul Connaughton Snr (FG)	3 seats 1981–1997
24th	1982 (Nov)	Noel Treacy (FF)	Michael P. Kitt (FF)	Paul Connaughton Snr (FG)	3 seats 1981–1997
25th	1987	Noel Treacy (FF)	Michael P. Kitt (FF)	Paul Connaughton Snr (FG)	3 seats 1981–1997
26th	1989	Noel Treacy (FF)	Michael P. Kitt (FF)	Paul Connaughton Snr (FG)	3 seats 1981–1997
27th	1992	Noel Treacy (FF)	Michael P. Kitt (FF)	Paul Connaughton Snr (FG)	3 seats 1981–1997
28th	1997	Noel Treacy (FF)	Michael P. Kitt (FF)	Paul Connaughton Snr (FG)	Ulick Burke (FG)
29th	2002	Noel Treacy (FF)	Joe Callanan (FF)	Paul Connaughton Snr (FG)	Paddy McHugh (Ind.)
30th	2007	Noel Treacy (FF)	Michael P. Kitt (FF)	Paul Connaughton Snr (FG)	Ulick Burke (FG)
31st	2011	Colm Keaveney (Lab)	Michael P. Kitt (FF)	Ciarán Cannon (FG)	Paul Connaughton Jnr (FG)
32nd	2016	Seán Canney (Ind.)	Anne Rabbitte (FF)	Ciarán Cannon (FG)	3 seats 2016–2024
33rd	2020	Seán Canney (Ind.)	Anne Rabbitte (FF)	Ciarán Cannon (FG)	3 seats 2016–2024
34th	2024	Seán Canney (Ind.)	Albert Dolan (FF)	Peter Roche (FG)	Louis O'Hara (SF)

Dáil	Election	Deputy (Party)	Deputy (Party)	Deputy (Party)
19th	1969	Thomas Hussey (FF)	Michael F. Kitt (FF)	John Donnellan (FG)
20th	1973	Thomas Hussey (FF)	Michael F. Kitt (FF)	John Donnellan (FG)
20th	1975 by-election	Thomas Hussey (FF)	Michael P. Kitt (FF)	John Donnellan (FG)
21st	1977	Constituency abolished. See Galway East		

Dáil	Election	Deputy (Party)	Deputy (Party)	Deputy (Party)	Deputy (Party)	Deputy (Party)
9th	1937	Gerald Bartley (FF)	Joseph Mongan (FG)	Seán Tubridy (FF)	3 seats 1937–1977	
10th	1938	Gerald Bartley (FF)	Joseph Mongan (FG)	Seán Tubridy (FF)	3 seats 1937–1977	
10th	1940 by-election	Gerald Bartley (FF)	Joseph Mongan (FG)	John J. Keane (FF)	3 seats 1937–1977	
11th	1943	Gerald Bartley (FF)	Joseph Mongan (FG)	Eamon Corbett (FF)	3 seats 1937–1977	
12th	1944	Gerald Bartley (FF)	Joseph Mongan (FG)	Michael Lydon (FF)	3 seats 1937–1977	
13th	1948	Gerald Bartley (FF)	Joseph Mongan (FG)	Michael Lydon (FF)	3 seats 1937–1977	
14th	1951	Gerald Bartley (FF)	John Mannion Snr (FG)	Peadar Duignan (FF)	3 seats 1937–1977	
15th	1954	Gerald Bartley (FF)	Fintan Coogan Snr (FG)	Johnny Geoghegan (FF)	3 seats 1937–1977	
16th	1957	Gerald Bartley (FF)	Fintan Coogan Snr (FG)	Johnny Geoghegan (FF)	3 seats 1937–1977	
17th	1961	Gerald Bartley (FF)	Fintan Coogan Snr (FG)	Johnny Geoghegan (FF)	3 seats 1937–1977	
18th	1965	Bobby Molloy (FF)	Fintan Coogan Snr (FG)	Johnny Geoghegan (FF)	3 seats 1937–1977	
19th	1969	Bobby Molloy (FF)	Fintan Coogan Snr (FG)	Johnny Geoghegan (FF)	3 seats 1937–1977	
20th	1973	Bobby Molloy (FF)	Fintan Coogan Snr (FG)	Johnny Geoghegan (FF)	3 seats 1937–1977	
20th	1975 by-election	Bobby Molloy (FF)	Fintan Coogan Snr (FG)	Máire Geoghegan-Quinn (FF)	3 seats 1937–1977	
21st	1977	Bobby Molloy (FF)	John Mannion Jnr (FG)	Máire Geoghegan-Quinn (FF)	Bill Loughnane (FF)	4 seats 1977–1981
22nd	1981	Bobby Molloy (FF)	John Donnellan (FG)	Máire Geoghegan-Quinn (FF)	Mark Killilea Jnr (FF)	Michael D. Higgins (Lab)
23rd	1982 (Feb)	Bobby Molloy (FF)	John Donnellan (FG)	Máire Geoghegan-Quinn (FF)	Frank Fahey (FF)	Michael D. Higgins (Lab)
24th	1982 (Nov)	Bobby Molloy (FF)	John Donnellan (FG)	Máire Geoghegan-Quinn (FF)	Frank Fahey (FF)	Fintan Coogan Jnr (FG)
25th	1987	Bobby Molloy (PDs)	John Donnellan (FG)	Máire Geoghegan-Quinn (FF)	Frank Fahey (FF)	Michael D. Higgins (Lab)
26th	1989	Bobby Molloy (PDs)	Pádraic McCormack (FG)	Máire Geoghegan-Quinn (FF)	Frank Fahey (FF)	Michael D. Higgins (Lab)
27th	1992	Bobby Molloy (PDs)	Pádraic McCormack (FG)	Máire Geoghegan-Quinn (FF)	Éamon Ó Cuív (FF)	Michael D. Higgins (Lab)
28th	1997	Bobby Molloy (PDs)	Pádraic McCormack (FG)	Frank Fahey (FF)	Éamon Ó Cuív (FF)	Michael D. Higgins (Lab)
29th	2002	Noel Grealish (PDs)	Pádraic McCormack (FG)	Frank Fahey (FF)	Éamon Ó Cuív (FF)	Michael D. Higgins (Lab)
30th	2007	Noel Grealish (PDs)	Pádraic McCormack (FG)	Frank Fahey (FF)	Éamon Ó Cuív (FF)	Michael D. Higgins (Lab)
31st	2011	Noel Grealish (Ind.)	Brian Walsh (FG)	Seán Kyne (FG)	Éamon Ó Cuív (FF)	Derek Nolan (Lab)
32nd	2016	Noel Grealish (Ind.)	Hildegarde Naughton (FG)	Seán Kyne (FG)	Éamon Ó Cuív (FF)	Catherine Connolly (Ind.)
33rd	2020	Noel Grealish (Ind.)	Hildegarde Naughton (FG)	Mairéad Farrell (SF)	Éamon Ó Cuív (FF)	Catherine Connolly (Ind.)
34th	2024	Noel Grealish (Ind.)	Hildegarde Naughton (FG)	Mairéad Farrell (SF)	John Connolly (FF)	Catherine Connolly (Ind.)
34th	2026 by-election	Noel Grealish (Ind.)	Hildegarde Naughton (FG)	Mairéad Farrell (SF)	John Connolly (FF)	Seán Kyne (FG)
