= Nehemiah Donnellan =

Archbishop

Nehemiah Donnellan (a.k.a. Fearganainm Ó Domhnalláin) (fl. c. 1560–1609) was Archbishop of Tuam.

== Background ==
Donellan was born in the county of Galway, a son of Mael Sechlainn Ó Dónalláin, by his wife Sisly, daughter of William Ó Cellaigh of Calla. He was a descendant of Domnallan mac Maelbrigdi.

He was entered as Nehemiah Daniel on 13 January 1579–80 at King's College, Cambridge, and shortly afterwards matriculated in the same name. Subsequently, he migrated to Catharine Hall, where he took the degree of B.A. in 1581–2.

== Career ==
On his return to his native country he acted for some time as coadjutor to William Ó Maolalaidh, archbishop of Tuam, and afterwards, on the recommendation of Thomas, earl of Ormonde, he was appointed the successor of that prelate, by letters patent dated 17 August 1595.

Two days later he received restitution of the temporalities. In the writ of privy seal directing his appointment, it was alleged that he was very fit to communicate with the people in their mother tongue, and a very meet instrument to retain and instruct them in duty and religion; and that he had also taken pains in translating and putting to the press the Communion Book and New Testament in the Irish language, which Her Majesty greatly approved of.

It is asserted by Teige Ó Dubhagáin (see Dugan), who drew up a pedigree of the Donellan family, that he was never in holy orders, but probably the genealogist may have been led to make this startling assertion simply by an unwillingness to acknowledge the orders of the reformed church. In addition to his see the archbishop held by dispensation the rectory of Kilmore in the county of Kilkenny, the vicarages of Castle-doagh in the diocese of Ossory, and of Donard in the diocese of Dublin. He voluntarily resigned his see in 1609, and dying shortly afterwards at Tuam, was buried in the cathedral there.

== Tiomna Nuadh ==
Donellan was a master of the Irish language, and continued the version of the New Testament which had been commenced by John Kearney and Nicholas Walsh, bishop of Ossory, and which was completed by William O'Donnell or Daniell, who was afterwards raised to the archepiscopal see of Tuam. It was published in 1602 at Dublin, under the title of Tiomna Nuadh ar dtighearna agus ar slanaightheora Iosa Criosd, ar na tarruing gu firinneach as Gréigis gu gaoidheilg. Re Huilliam O Domhnuill. It was brought out at the expense of the province of Connaught and of Sir William Usher, the clerk of the council in Ireland. Great expectations were formed of this undertaking, and it was confidently believed that it would be the means of destroying the Roman church in Ireland. It is a noteworthy fact that of the four scholars engaged in translating the New Testament into the Irish vernacular, three – Kearney, Walsh, and Donellan – received their education at the University of Cambridge.

== Family ==
By his wife Elizabeth, daughter of Nicolas O'Donnell, he had issue:

- – John
- – James, who was knighted, and became Chief Justice of the Irish Common Pleas
- – Edmund, of Killucan in the county of Westmeath
- – Teigue, of Ballyheague in the county of Kildare
- – Murtough, who received holy orders in the Roman Catholic Church.

== See also ==
Bible translations into Irish
