= Michael Donnellan (politician) =

Irish politician and sportsman (1900–1964)

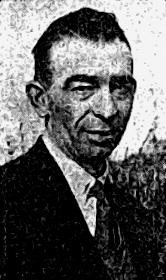
- Donnellan, c. 1944

Parliamentary Secretary
- 1954–1957: Finance
- 1948–1951: Finance

Teachta Dála
- In office February 1948 – October 1961
- Constituency: Galway North
- In office October 1961 – 27 September 1964
- In office June 1943 – February 1948
- Constituency: Galway East

Leader of Clann na Talmhan
- In office June 1939 – September 1944
- Preceded by: New office
- Succeeded by: Joseph Blowick

Personal details
- Born: 1900 Dunmore, County Galway
- Died: 27 September 1964 (aged 63–64)
- Party: Sinn Féin (1920s); Fianna Fáil (1930s); Clann na Talmhan (1940s)
- Spouse: Teresa Griffth (m. 1933)
- Children: 10, including John and Pat
- Occupation: Farmer

Michael Donnellan (1900 – 27 September 1964) was an Irish Clann na Talmhan politician.

Donnellan was born in Dunmore, County Galway in 1900. He joined Sinn Féin after the Easter Rising in 1916. Donnellan served as a member of Galway County Council from 1927 until 1945, originally as a member of Fianna Fáil.

Donnellan became disenchanted with the party in the mid-1930s, as did many supporters in the province of Connacht. He became involved in talks with a number of farmers in order to create a new Farmers' Party. The original group was known as the Irish Farmers Federation, however, it split shortly afterwards between the larger more conservative farmers and poorer more radical farmers from the West over the issue of de-rating. Donnellan led the radical faction, which founded Clann na Talmhan in 1939. In 1940 a by-election was called in the Galway West constituency and his supporters persuaded him to stand. Fine Gael stood aside hoping to inflict damage on Fianna Fáil, which won, though Donnellan secured almost 30% of the votes cast.

At the first Ard chomhairle of Clann na Talmhan in March 1943, he stated that the party's reason for existing was to "break the stranglehold of the money-grubbers and Jews". According to historian RM Douglas, this was not the only act of anti-Semitism Donnellan committed as party leader.

He was elected to Dáil Éireann as a TD for Galway East at the 1943 general election and re-elected in 1944. Following constituency revision, he represented Galway North between 1948 and 1961 before being elected again for Galway East in the 1961 general election.

Donnellan, however, proved too radical for the party members from the province of Leinster, due to his more left-wing leanings: He supported land redistribution in cases where large farmer holders were being inefficient as well as free access to education and healthcare. He was soon replaced as party leader by conservative Mayoman Joseph Blowick. Donnellan's decision to abstain on Éamon de Valera's nomination for Taoiseach in 1943 led some to suspect he had done so out of loyalty to his old party leader. Donnellan served as a Parliamentary Secretary to the Minister for Finance on two occasions with responsibility for the Office of Public Works.

In his youth Donnellan was a talented footballer who won an All-Ireland SFC medal with the Galway county team in 1925, captaining them in their 1933 defeat to Cavan. He died at Croke Park during the 1964 All-Ireland Senior Football Championship Final, shortly before his sons John Donnellan, as victorious Galway captain and Pat Donnellan, received the Sam Maguire Cup. The subsequent by-election was won by John, standing as a Fine Gael candidate.

In 1933, he married Teresa Griffth of Balla, County Mayo; they had two sons and eight daughters.

His grandson, also named Michael, won All-Ireland SFC medals with Galway in 1998 and 2001.

== See also ==
- Families in the Oireachtas

Party political offices
New political party	Leader of Clann na Talmhan; 1939–1944	Succeeded by Joseph Blowick
Political offices
Preceded by Seán O'Grady	Parliamentary Secretary to the Minister for Finance; 1948–1951	Succeeded by Patrick Beegan
Preceded by Patrick Beegan	Parliamentary Secretary to the Minister for Finance; 1954–1957	Succeeded by Patrick Beegan

Dáil	Election	Deputy (Party)	Deputy (Party)	Deputy (Party)	Deputy (Party)
9th	1937	Frank Fahy (FF)	Mark Killilea Snr (FF)	Patrick Beegan (FF)	Seán Broderick (FG)
10th	1938	Frank Fahy (FF)	Mark Killilea Snr (FF)	Patrick Beegan (FF)	Seán Broderick (FG)
11th	1943	Frank Fahy (FF)	Mark Killilea Snr (FF)	Patrick Beegan (FF)	Michael Donnellan (CnaT)
12th	1944	Frank Fahy (FF)	Mark Killilea Snr (FF)	Patrick Beegan (FF)	Michael Donnellan (CnaT)
13th	1948	Constituency abolished. See Galway North and Galway South			

Dáil	Election	Deputy (Party)	Deputy (Party)	Deputy (Party)	Deputy (Party)	Deputy (Party)
17th	1961	Michael F. Kitt (FF)	Anthony Millar (FF)	Michael Carty (FF)	Michael Donnellan (CnaT)	Brigid Hogan-O'Higgins (FG)
17th	1964 by-election	Michael F. Kitt (FF)	Anthony Millar (FF)	Michael Carty (FF)	John Donnellan (FG)	Brigid Hogan-O'Higgins (FG)
18th	1965	Michael F. Kitt (FF)	Anthony Millar (FF)	Michael Carty (FF)	John Donnellan (FG)	Brigid Hogan-O'Higgins (FG)
19th	1969	Constituency abolished. See Galway North-East and Clare–South Galway				

Dáil	Election	Deputy (Party)	Deputy (Party)	Deputy (Party)	Deputy (Party)
21st	1977	Johnny Callanan (FF)	Thomas Hussey (FF)	Mark Killilea Jnr (FF)	John Donnellan (FG)
22nd	1981	Johnny Callanan (FF)	Michael P. Kitt (FF)	Paul Connaughton Snr (FG)	3 seats 1981–1997
23rd	1982 (Feb)	Johnny Callanan (FF)	Michael P. Kitt (FF)	Paul Connaughton Snr (FG)	3 seats 1981–1997
23rd	1982 by-election	Noel Treacy (FF)	Michael P. Kitt (FF)	Paul Connaughton Snr (FG)	3 seats 1981–1997
24th	1982 (Nov)	Noel Treacy (FF)	Michael P. Kitt (FF)	Paul Connaughton Snr (FG)	3 seats 1981–1997
25th	1987	Noel Treacy (FF)	Michael P. Kitt (FF)	Paul Connaughton Snr (FG)	3 seats 1981–1997
26th	1989	Noel Treacy (FF)	Michael P. Kitt (FF)	Paul Connaughton Snr (FG)	3 seats 1981–1997
27th	1992	Noel Treacy (FF)	Michael P. Kitt (FF)	Paul Connaughton Snr (FG)	3 seats 1981–1997
28th	1997	Noel Treacy (FF)	Michael P. Kitt (FF)	Paul Connaughton Snr (FG)	Ulick Burke (FG)
29th	2002	Noel Treacy (FF)	Joe Callanan (FF)	Paul Connaughton Snr (FG)	Paddy McHugh (Ind.)
30th	2007	Noel Treacy (FF)	Michael P. Kitt (FF)	Paul Connaughton Snr (FG)	Ulick Burke (FG)
31st	2011	Colm Keaveney (Lab)	Michael P. Kitt (FF)	Ciarán Cannon (FG)	Paul Connaughton Jnr (FG)
32nd	2016	Seán Canney (Ind.)	Anne Rabbitte (FF)	Ciarán Cannon (FG)	3 seats 2016–2024
33rd	2020	Seán Canney (Ind.)	Anne Rabbitte (FF)	Ciarán Cannon (FG)	3 seats 2016–2024
34th	2024	Seán Canney (Ind.)	Albert Dolan (FF)	Peter Roche (FG)	Louis O'Hara (SF)

Dáil	Election	Deputy (Party)	Deputy (Party)	Deputy (Party)
13th	1948	Mark Killilea Snr (FF)	Michael F. Kitt (FF)	Michael Donnellan (CnaT)
14th	1951	Mark Killilea Snr (FF)	James Hession (FG)	Michael Donnellan (CnaT)
15th	1954	Mark Killilea Snr (FF)	James Hession (FG)	Michael Donnellan (CnaT)
16th	1957	Mark Killilea Snr (FF)	Michael F. Kitt (FF)	Michael Donnellan (CnaT)
17th	1961	Constituency abolished. See Galway East and Galway West		
