= 1965 All-Ireland Senior Football Championship final =

- Event: 1965 All-Ireland Senior Football Championship
Galway	Kerry
0–12	0–9
- Date: 26 September 1965
- Venue: Croke Park, Dublin
- Referee: Mick Loftus (Mayo)
- Attendance: 77,735

The 1965 All-Ireland Senior Football Championship final was the 78th All-Ireland Final and the deciding match of the 1965 All-Ireland Senior Football Championship, an inter-county Gaelic football tournament for the top teams in Ireland.

== Match ==
This year's final was played on 26 September.

=== Summary ===
For the first time since the 1941 final, the same two counties contested the decider in successive years. However, it was far from the magical spectacle that fans expected, given the high-scoring performance that both sides gave in the 1964 final. Destructive football and indiscriminate jersey-pulling, leading to three players being sent-off, marred a game that never delivered as much as it had promised. 13 of the 21 scores came from frees, both Bernie O'Callaghan and Cyril Dunne called upon many times to edge their county ahead. It was essentially "Survival of the Fittest", but even in this unpromising setting, there were some performances of real merit. Pat Donnellan, who had outplayed Denis O'Sullivan early on, stepped into the breach at a stage when O'Callaghan had reduced Kerry's arrears to a minimum. The Kerry resurgence had been fueled by a vintage period for Mick O'Connell, but when the Galway mentors switched Donnellan onto the Valentia man, midfield control - slight though it was - swung back to the reigning champions. With 15 minutes remaining, Séamus Leydon had Galway's twelfth point but Kerry had not the ability to profit from this period of stagnation, and their only return for some enthusiastic, but poorly organised attacks, was the pointed frees from O'Connell and O'Callaghan. The margin of three points hardly flattered Galway, but the Tribesmen had too much on the day for Kerry and duly collected their second consecutive All-Ireland SFC title.

It was the second of three in a row All-Ireland SFC titles won by Galway in the 1960s, which made them joint "team of the decade" with Down who also won three.

Galway's three 1960s titles came consecutively.

=== Details ===
Galway
Kerry

Galway; Maroon & White Shirts/White Shorts/Maroon Socks	0–12 – 0–9 (final score after 60 minutes)	Kerry; Green & Gold Shirts/White shorts/Green Socks
Manager: John "Tull" Dunne Team: 1 Johnny Geraghty (GK); 2 Enda Colleran (c); 3 Noel Tierney; 4 Bosco McDermott; 5 John Donnellan; 6 Seán Meade; 7 Martin L. Newell; 9 Mick Garrett; 8 Pat Donnellan; 10 Cyril Dunne; 11 Mattie McDonagh; 12 Seamus Leydon; 13 Christy Tyrrell; 14 Seán Cleary; 15 John Keenan (substituted off) ?' Substitutes used: 16 Mick Reynolds (substituted on) ?' for Keenan; Substitutes not used: 17 Tom Sands; 18 Tommy Keenan; 19 B. Geraghty; 20 Michael Moore	Half-time: 0–7 – 0–5 Competition: All-Ireland Senior Football Championship (Final) Date: 15.30 BST; Sunday, September 26, 1965 Venue: Croke Park, Dublin Attendance: 77,735 Referee: Mick Loftus (Mayo) Match rules: 60 minutes. Replay if scores still level. Maximum of 3 substitutions.	Manager: Jim Brosnan Team: 1 Johnny Culloty (GK); 2 Donie O'Sullivan; 3 Niall Sheehy; 4 Mick Morris; 5 Sean Murphy?/Séamus Murphy; 6 Paud O'Donoghue; 7 Jerdie O'Connor (c); 8 Denis O'Sullivan; 9 Mick O'Connell; 10 Vincent Lucey (substituted off) ?'; 11 Pat Griffin; 12 Derry O'Shea; 13 Bernie O'Callaghan; 14 Mick O'Dwyer; 15 J. J. Barrett (substituted off) ?' Substitutes used: 21 Jimmy O'Shea?Jerome O'Shea (substituted on) ?' for Barrett; 18 D. Geaney (substituted on) ?' for Lucey; Substitutes not used: 16 M. Kelly; 17 J. Lucey; 19 S. Burrows; 20 P. Bowler; 22 J. Burke; 23 T. Sheehan; 24 S. Mac Gearailt
