= 1964 All-Ireland Senior Football Championship final =

- Event: 1964 All-Ireland Senior Football Championship
Galway	Kerry
0–15	0–10
- Date: 27 September 1964
- Venue: Croke Park, Dublin
- Referee: Jimmy Hatton (Wicklow)
- Attendance: 76,498

The 1964 All-Ireland Senior Football Championship final was the 77th All-Ireland Final and the deciding match of the 1964 All-Ireland Senior Football Championship, an inter-county Gaelic football tournament for the top teams in Ireland.

== Match ==
This year's final was played on 27 September.

=== Summary ===
Galway took a four-point lead in the first ten minutes, and won with the help of Cyril Dunne's nine points. It was the first of three All-Ireland SFC titles won by Galway in the 1960s, which made them joint "team of the decade" with Down, who also won three.

Galway's three 1960s titles came consecutively.

To say that Kerry were favourites for this final would be an understatement, and given the contrast of both counties' semi-final victories, few people saw past Kerry for the All-Ireland SFC title. Galway's hard-fought two-point victory over Meath could hardly compare to Kerry's 12-point demolition of Cavan, or could it. If there was a prepared script, Galway didn't read it, as they proceeded to run the favourites ragged with a wonderful display of constructive, intelligent football. Their opening salvo yielded 4 points as Kerry sought to impose their own pattern on the game. They did manage to save face and at half-time, the four-point gap remained, 0-7 to 0-3 in favour of Galway. Early second-half uncertainty on Galway's part almost allowed Kerry back into the decider, and if they had taken one of two early goal chances, they might just have done that. It was the wake-up call Galway needed as the flow of the game steered irresistibly into Galway's hands. Cyril punished every Kerry indiscretion with the signal of a white flag. Mick O'Connell responded with equal aplomb but when Galway's lead extended to six points, it was all over. Galway had won a first title since 1956 and a fifth overall. It was to be the first part of a memorable "Three In A Row".

Michael Donnellan died at this game, shortly before his son John lifted the Sam Maguire Cup.

=== Details ===
27 September 1964; Final	Galway	0–15 – 0–10	Kerry	Croke Park, Dublin; Attendance: 76,498; Referee: Jimmy Hatton (Wicklow)
27 September 1964; Final	C Dunne 0–9, S Leydon 0–2, C Tyrrell 0–1, J Keenan 0–1, S Cleary 0–1, M McDonagh 0–1		M O'Connell 0–7, P Griffin 0–2, M O'Dwyer 0–1	Croke Park, Dublin; Attendance: 76,498; Referee: Jimmy Hatton (Wicklow)

Galway
Kerry

Galway; Maroon & White Shirts/White Shorts/Maroon Socks	0–15 – 0–10 (final score after 60 minutes)	Kerry; Green & Gold Shirts/White shorts/Green Socks
Manager:John "Tull" Dunne Team: 1 Johnny Geraghty (GK); 2 Enda Colleran; 3 Noel Tierney; 4 Bosco McDermott; 5 John Donnellan (c); 6 Seán Meade; 7 Martin L. Newell; 8 Mick Garrett; 9 Mick Reynolds; 10 Cyril Dunne; 11 Mattie McDonagh; 12 Séamus Leydon; 13 Christy Tyrrell; 14 Seán Cleary; 15 John Keenan Substitutes: 16 Michael Moore; 17 Kieran O'Connor; 18 Tom Sands; 19 Pat Donnellan; 20 Brian Geraghty; 21 Michael Coen; 22 Tommy Keenan	Half-time: 0–7 – 0–3 Competition: All-Ireland Senior Football Championship (Final) Date: 15.30 BST; Sunday, September 27, 1964 Venue: Croke Park, Dublin Attendance: 76,498 Referee: Jimmy Hatton (Wicklow) Match rules: 60 minutes. Replay if scores still level. Maximum of 3 substitutions.	Manager: ??? Team: 1 Johnny Culloty (GK); 2 Mick Morris; 3 Niall Sheehy (c); 4 Paud O'Donoghue; 5 Denis O'Sullivan; 6 Séamus Murphy; 7 Jerdie O'Connor (substituted off) ?'; 8 Mick Fleming; 9 Donie O'Sullivan; 10 Pat Griffin; 11 Mick O'Dwyer; 12 Mick O'Connell; 13 Frank O'Leary (substituted off) ?'; 14 Tom Long; 15 J. J. Barrett Substitutes used: 18 John McCarthy (substituted on) ?' for J. D. O'Connor; 24 Bernie O'Callaghan (substituted on) ?' for F. O'Leary; 16 Kevin Coffey (substituted on) ?' for F. Leary; Substitutes not used: 17 Dom O'Donnell; 19 Derry O'Shea; 20 J. Burke; 21 Brian Sheehy; 22 Peter Hanley; 23 Timmy O'Sullivan
