= 1963 All-Ireland Senior Football Championship final =

- Event: 1963 All-Ireland Senior Football Championship
Dublin	Galway
1–9 (12)	0–10 (10)
- Date: 22 September 1963
- Venue: Croke Park, Dublin
- Referee: Eamonn Moules (Wicklow)
- Attendance: 87,106

The 1963 All-Ireland Senior Football Championship final was the 76th All-Ireland Final and the deciding match of the 1963 All-Ireland Senior Football Championship, an inter-county Gaelic football tournament for the top teams in Ireland.

== Match ==
This year's final was played on 22 September.

=== Summary ===
Brian McDonald took the line ball that led to Dublin's goal, which was finished by Simon Behan after a small-rectangle scuffle involving six defenders and four attackers. Galway narrowed the gap to one point near the end, but John Timmons put Dublin two ahead. Referee Eamonn Moules (Wicklow) denied Galway a last-minute penalty.

Galway were beaten by a Simon Behan goal.

Man of the match was Leo Hickey.

=== Details ===
Dublin
Galway

Dublin: Pascal Flynn; Leo Hickey, Lar Foley, Bill Casey; Des McKane, Paddy Holden, Mick Kissane; Des Foley, John Timmons; Brian McDonald, Mickey Whelan, Gerry Davey; Simon Behan, Des Ferguson, Noel Fox.

Galway: Michael Moore; Seán Meade, Noel Tierney, Bosco McDermott; John Donnellan, Enda Colleran, Martin L. Newell; Mick Garrett, Mick Reynolds; Cyril Dunne, Mattie McDonagh, Pat Donnellan; John Keenan, Seán Cleary, Séamus Leydon. Sub: Brian Geraghty for Seán Cleary.

==== Dublin ====
- 1 P. Flynn
- 2 L. Hickey
- 3 L. Foley
- 4 B. Casey
- 5 D. McKane
- 6 P. Holden
- 7 M. Kissane
- 8 D. Foley (c)
- 9 J. Timmons
- 10 B. McDonald
- 11 M. Whelan
- 12 G. Davey
- 13 S. Behan
- 14 D. Ferguson
- 15 N. Fox

Subs
16 F. McPhillips
17 C. Kane
18 P. Downey
19 A. Donnelly
20 É. Breslin
21 P. Synnott
22 S. Lee
23 S. Coen
24 K. Heffernan

==== Galway ====
- 1 M. Moore
- 2 E. Colleran
- 3 N. Tierney
- 4 S. Meade
- 5 B. McDermott
- 6 J. Donnellan
- 7 M. L. Newell
- 8 M. Garrett (c)
- 9 M. Reynolds
- 10 C. Dunne
- 11 M. McDonagh
- 12 P. Donnellan
- 13 J. Keenan
- 14 S. Cleary
- 15 S. Leydon

Sub used
B. Geraghty for S. Cleary
