= 1960 O'Byrne Cup =

Gaelic football competition, Leinster, Ireland

Tournament details
- Province: Leinster
- Year: 1960
- Trophy: O'Byrne Cup
- Date: 20 March 1960 — 1 October 1961
- Teams: 12

Winners
- Champions: Dublin (3rd win)
- Captain: Cathal O'Leary

Runners-up
- Runners-up: Louth
- Captain: Kevin Beahan

The 1960 O'Byrne Cup was a Gaelic football tournament contested by the county teams of Leinster GAA. It was the seventh staging of the O'Byrne Cup competition.

Dublin won the delayed tournament after defeating Louth in the final replay, at Croke Park on 1 October 1961.

== Format ==
The tournament was contested on a knockout basis.

== Results ==
=== First Round ===
| 20 March 1960 | Longford | 3-05 - 2-02 | Westmeath | Pearse Park, Longford |

| 20 March 1960 | Wicklow | 1-07 - 2-07 | Dublin | Aughrim, Wicklow |

| 20 March 1960 | Offaly | 1-07 - 1-09 | Kildare | O'Connor Park, Tullamore |

| 20 March 1960 | Laois | 3-10 - 0-05 | Kilkenny | O'Moore Park, Portlaoise |

| 20 March 1960 | Carlow | 4-09 - 0-04 | Wexford | Dr Cullen Park, Carlow |

| 20 March 1960 | Meath | 2-07 - 3-07 | Louth | Páirc Tailteann, Navan |

=== Second Round ===
| 12 June 1960 | Louth | 0-08 - 0-05 | Carlow | Gaelic Grounds, Drogheda |

| 12 June 1960 | Kildare | 2-06 - 1-06 | Carlow | St Conleth's Park, Newbridge |

| 12 June 1960 | Dublin | 1-16 - 2-09 | Laois | Croke Park |

=== Semi-Final ===
| 14 August 1960 | Kildare | 1-06 - 1-10 | Dublin | St Conleth's Park, Newbridge |

Louth received a bye into the Final.

=== Final ===
| 30 April 1961 | Louth | 1-09 - 2-06 | Dublin | Croke Park |

| 1 October 1961 Replay | Dublin | 1-11 - 0-07 | Louth | Croke Park |
| | John Timmons 0-7, B. McCrea 1-0, M. Whelan 0-2, P. Farnan, J. Joyce 0-1 each | | F. Clarke 0-4, K. Beahan 0-3 | Referee: P. Mooney (Meath) |

| GK | 1 | Pascal Flynn (St Mary's) |
| RCB | 2 | Christy Kane (Clanna Gael) |
| FB | 3 | Leo Hickey (Ballyboughal) |
| LCB | 4 | Joe Timmons (Seán McDermotts) |
| RHB | 5 | Des McKane (St Vincent's) |
| CHB | 6 | Paddy Holden (Clanna Gael) |
| LHB | 7 | Cathal O'Leary (St Vincent's) |
| MF | 8 | Mickey Whelan (Clanna Gael) |
| MF | 9 | Des Foley (St Vincent's) |
| RHF | 10 | Tom Howard (Fingallians) |
| CHF | 11 | Bob McCrea (Clanna Gael) |
| LHF | 12 | Simon Behan (St Vincent's) |
| RCF | 13 | Paddy Farnan (St Vincent's) |
| FF | 14 | Johnny Joyce (St Vincent's) |
| LCF | 15 | John Timmons (Seán McDermotts) |
Substitutes:
| | 16 | Paddy Delaney (O'Toole's) for Behan |

| GK | 1 | Matt Murphy (Newtown Blues) |
| RCB | 2 | Oliver Judge (Newtown Blues) |
| FB | 3 | George Carroll (Oliver Plunketts) |
| LCB | 4 | Stephen White (Dundalk Young Irelands) |
| RHB | 5 | Patsy Coleman (St Mary's) |
| CHB | 6 | Jim McArdle (Roche Emmets) |
| LHB | 7 | Jim Duffy (Dundalk Gaels) |
| MF | 8 | Jimmy Mulroy (Newtown Blues) |
| MF | 9 | John Woods (Cooley Kickhams) |
| RHF | 10 | Kevin Beahan (St Mary's) |
| CHF | 11 | Frank Lynch (Geraldines) |
| LHF | 12 | Liam Leech (Newtown Blues) |
| RCF | 13 | Peter Shevlin (Naomh Fionnbarra) |
| FF | 14 | Jackie Reynolds (Naomh Mhuire) |
| LCF | 15 | Frank Clarke (Naomh Mhuire) |
Substitutes:
| | 16 | Andy Kieran (Naomh Mhuire) for Murphy |
| | 17 | John McArdle (Clan na Gael) for Duffy |
