= Séamus Leydon =

Irish Gaelic footballer (1942–2023)

Personal information
- Native name: Séamus Ó Liodáin (Irish)
- Nickname: The Dunmore Dynamo
- Born: 1942 Dunmore, County Galway, Ireland
- Died: 31 October 2023 (aged 81) The Curragh, County Kildare, Ireland
- Occupation: Sales director
- Height: 5 ft 9 in (175 cm)

Sport
- Sport: Gaelic football
- Position: Left wing-forward
Clubs
- Years: Club
- 1960–1972 1972–1975: Dunmore McHales; Nemo Rangers
Club titles
- Galway titles: 5
- Connacht titles: 1
Inter-county
Years	County	Apps (scores)
1961–1972	Galway	33 (9-41)
Inter-county titles
- Connacht titles: 7
- All-Irelands: 3
- NFL: 1
- All Stars: 1

Séamus Leydon (1942 – 31 October 2023) was an Irish Gaelic footballer who played for club sides Dunmore McHales and Nemo Rangers, and at inter-county level with the Galway senior football team.

== Career ==
Leydon first played Gaelic football to a high standard as a student at St Jarlath's College in Tuam. He won two Connacht Colleges JFC titles and was part of the college's senior team that beat St Finian's College to win the Hogan Cup in 1960. Leydon's club career with Dunmore McHales also began around this time and he won his first Galway SFC medal in 1961. It was the first of five winners' medals, as Dunmore also claimed the title in 1963, 1966, 1968 and 1969. Leydon was also part of the Dunmore team that won the inaugural Connacht Club SFC title in 1966.

Leydon first played for Galway as a member of the minor team in 1959. He won the first of two consecutive Connacht MFC medals that year before winning an All-Ireland MFC medal after a defeat of Cork in 1960. A season with the Galway junior team yielded a Connacht JFC medal in 1961.

After sustaining an injury which required a lengthy absence playing for the junior team, Leydon made his senior team debut in late 1961. He won the first of four consecutive Connacht SFC medals in 1963, while he also made the first of four consecutive All-Ireland final appearances that year but lost out to Dublin. Three successive All-Ireland SFC titles followed for Leydon, beating Kerry in the finals of 1964 and 1965 and Meath in the 1966 decider. He also claimed a National League title in 1965.

Leydon won three more Connacht SFC medals in 1968, 1970 and 1971, while he served as team captain in 1968. He was also a regular on the Connacht inter-provincial team for almost a decade and won Railway Cup medals in 1967 and 1969. Leydon's last big occasion for Galway was when he lined out at left corner-forward in the 1971 All-Ireland final defeat by Offaly. His performances that season earned him his only All Star.

Leydon retired from inter-county football in 1972 when his job as regional sales director with Cantrell and Cochrane required him to move to Cork. He joined the Nemo Rangers club in the city and won consecutive Cork SFC and Munster Club SFC titles in 1974 and 1975. Leydon also lined out when Nemo were beaten by University College Dublin in the 1975 All-Ireland club final.

== Death ==
Leydon died at St Bridget's Hospice, The Curragh on 31 October 2023, at the age of 81.

== Honours ==
=== Team ===
St Jarlath's College

- Hogan Cup: 1960
- Connacht Colleges Senior Football Championship: 1960

Dunmore

- Connacht Senior Club Football Championship: 1966
- Galway Senior Football Championship: 1961, 1963, 1966, 1968 (c), 1969

Nemo Rangers

- Munster Senior Club Football Championship: 1974, 1975
- Cork Senior Football Championship: 1974, 1975

Galway

- All-Ireland Senior Football Championship: 1964, 1965, 1966
- Connacht Senior Football Championship: 1963, 1964, 1965, 1966, 1968, 1970, 1971
- National Football League: 1964–65
- Connacht Junior Football Championship: 1961
- All-Ireland Minor Football Championship: 1960
- Connacht Minor Football Championship: 1959, 1960

Conancht

- Railway Cup: 1967, 1969

=== Individual ===
- Galway Team of the Millennium: Left wing-forward
- All Star Award: 1971
- Cú Chulainn Award: 1965, 1966

Sporting positions
Preceded by Colie McDonagh	Galway senior football team captain 1969	Succeeded by Tommy Keenan
