= Tommy Keenan (Gaelic footballer) =

Galway Gaelic footballer (1944–2025)

Personal information
- Native name: Tomás Ó Cianáin (Irish)
- Born: 1944 Dunmore, County Galway, Ireland
- Died: 29 April 2025 (aged 81) Dunmore, County Galway, Ireland

Sport
- Sport: Gaelic football
- Position: Right wing-back
Club
- Years: Club
- Dunmore MacHales
Club titles
- Galway titles: 5
- Connacht titles: 1
Inter-county
- Years: County
- 1964–1970: Galway
Inter-county titles
- Connacht titles: 3
- All-Irelands: 2
- NFL: 1

Thomas Keenan (1944 – 29 April 2025) was an Irish Gaelic football coach and player. At club level, he played with Dunmore MacHales, and at inter-county level with the Galway senior football team.

== Playing career ==
Keenan played Gaelic football at all grades as a student at St Jarlath's College in Tuam. He was part of the college's senior team that won the Connacht Colleges SFC title in 1961, before later claiming the Hogan Cup title after a 2-08 to 1-08 win over St Mel's College.

At club level, Keenan first played for the Dunmore MacHales at juvenile and underage levels, before progressing to the club's senior team. He won five Galway SFC medals between 1963 and 1973. Keenan also won a Connacht Club SFC medal when Dunmore claimed the inaugural title in 1966.

Keenan first played for Galway at inter-county level as a member of the under-21 team that won back-to-back Connacht U21FC titles in 1964 and 1965. He progressed to the senior team and was a substitute on the All-Ireland SFC-winning teams in 1964 and 1965, alongside his brother John. Keenan captained Galway to the Connacht SFC title in 1970.

== Management career ==
In retirement from playing, Keenan became involved in team management and coaching. He was a selector with the Galway minor team that beat Coark by 2-08 to 1-07 to win the All-Ireland MFC title in 1986.

== Death ==
Keenan died on 29 April 2025, at the age of 81.

== Honours ==
St Jarlath's College

- Hogan Cup: 1961
- Connacht Colleges Senior Football Championship: 1961

Dunmore MacHales

- Connacht Senior Club Football Championship: 1966
- Galway Senior Football Championship: 1963, 1966, 1968, 1969, 1973

Galway

- All-Ireland Senior Football Championship: 1964, 1965
- Connacht Senior Football Championship: 1964, 1965, 1970 (c)
- National Football League: 1964–65
- All-Ireland Junior Football Championship: 1965
- Connacht Junior Football Championship: 1965
- Connacht Under-21 Football Championship: 1964, 1965

Sporting positions
Preceded by Séamus Leydon	Galway senior football team captain 1970	Succeeded by Liam Sammon
