= Cyril Dunne =

Irish Gaelic footballer (1941–2024)

Personal information
- Native name: Cyril Ó Dúinn (Irish)
- Born: 1941 Ballinasloe, County Galway, Ireland
- Died: 5 December 2024 (aged 83) Kilkerrin, County Galway, Ireland
- Occupation: Born na Móna employee
- Height: 5 ft 9 in (175 cm)

Sport
- Sport: Gaelic football
- Position: Right wing-forward
Club
- Years: Club
- St Grellan's
Club titles
- Galway titles: 0
Inter-county
- Years: County
- 1960–1971: Galway
Inter-county titles
- Connacht titles: 6
- All-Irelands: 3
- NFL: 1

Cyril Dunne (1941 – 5 December 2024) was an Irish hurler, Gaelic football player and manager. At club level he played with St Grellan's and Milltown, while he was also a member of the Galway senior teams as a dual player.

== Playing career ==
Son of John "Tull" Dunne who won All-Ireland SFC medals with Galway in 1934 and 1938. Dunne had his first sporting success as a schoolboy when he won the Connacht Colleges SHC title in 1959. His club career saw him play with St Grellan's in Ballinasloe.

On the inter-county scene, Dunne first play for Galway as a member of the minor team that won the Connacht MFC title in 1959. He was immediately drafted onto the junior team and also claimed provincial honours in this grade in 1960, before making his senior team debut.

Dunne won the first of four successive Connacht SFC medals in 1963. He also made four successive All-Ireland final appearances at this time, on a team managed by his father, with victories in 1964, 1965 and 1966. Dunne also claimed a National League medal in 1965. He won further Connacht SFC medals in 1968 and 1970, while he also lined out with the Galway senior hurling team in the Munster SHC.

Dunne's performances at inter-county level earned his selection to the Connacht team in both codes. He won a Railway Cup medal with the provincial footballers in 1969. Dunne retired from inter-county activity in March 1971.

== Coaching career ==
Dunne began his coaching career at club level when St Grellan's won back-to-back Galway SFC titles in 1979 and 1980. He moved to the inter-county scene as manager of Galway's under-21 team in 1983. Dunne served as Galway's senior team manager between 1984 and 1986 and won a Connacht SFC title in 1985.

== Death ==
Dunne died on 5 December 2024, at the age of 83.

== Honours ==
=== Player ===
St Joseph's College

- Connacht Colleges Senior Hurling Championship: 1959

Galway

- All-Ireland Senior Football Championship: 1964, 1965, 1966
- Connacht Senior Football Championship: 1963, 1964, 1965, 1966, 1968, 1970
- National Football League: 1964–65
- Connacht Junior Football Championship: 1960
- Connacht Minor Football Championship: 1959

Connacht

- Railway Cup: 1967

=== Management ===
St Grellan's

- Galway Senior Football Championship: 1979, 1980

Galway

- Connacht Senior Football Championship: 1986

Sporting positions
Preceded by Tony Regan	Galway senior football team manager 1984–1986	Succeeded by Willie Joyce
