= Brian McDonald (Dublin Gaelic footballer) =

Irish Gaelic footballer

Personal information
- Native name: Brian Mac Dónaill (Irish)
- Born: 1941 (age 84–85) Dublin, Ireland
- Height: 5 ft 8 in (173 cm)

Sport
- Sport: Gaelic football
- Position: Right wing-forward
Club
- Years: Club
- Synge Street P.P.
Club titles
- Dublin titles: 0
Inter-county
- Years: County
- 1963-1965: Dublin
Inter-county titles
- Leinster titles: 2
- All-Irelands: 1
- NFL: 0

Brian McDonald (born 1941) is an Irish retired Gaelic footballer who played for club side Synge Street P.P. ( since 1999 now called Templeogue Synge Street ) and at inter-county level with the Dublin senior football team.

== Career ==
Born in Dublin, McDonald first enjoyed success as a schoolboy with CBS Roscommon, with whom he won Connacht Colleges Championship medal. His performances earned inclusion on the Roscommon minor teams as a dual player, however, he subsequently lined out with the Dublin minor team that won the All-Ireland Championship in 1958 when Mayo were beaten in the final. McDonald won a second successive title from centre-forward the following year before winning an All-Ireland Junior Championship title in 1960. After joining the Dublin senior team, he won Leinster Championship medals in 1963 and 1965. He was a member of the Dublin squad that defeated Galway to win the 1963 All-Ireland final.

== Honours ==
Dublin

- All-Ireland Senior Football Championship: 1963
- Leinster Senior Football Championship: 1963, 1965
- All-Ireland Junior Football Championship: 1960
- Leinster Junior Football Championship: 1960
- All-Ireland Minor Football Championship: 1958, 1959
- Leinster Minor Football Championship: 1958, 1959
