= Mick Kissane =

Irish Gaelic footballer

Personal information
- Native name: Mícheál Ó Cíosáin (Irish)
- Born: 1941 (age 84–85) Dublin, Ireland
- Height: 6 ft 1 in (185 cm)

Sport
- Sport: Gaelic football
- Position: Left wing-back
Club
- Years: Club
- St. Vincent's
Club titles
- Dublin titles: 5
Inter-county
- Years: County
- 1962-1965: Dublin
Inter-county titles
- Leinster titles: 2
- All-Irelands: 1
- NFL: 0

Michael Kissane (born 1941) is an Irish retired Gaelic footballer who played for club side St. Vincent's and at inter-county level with the Dublin senior football team.

== Career ==
Kissane first enjoyed success as a schoolboy with St Joseph's, with whom he won a Leinster Colleges Junior Championship title. His performances quickly brought him to the notice of the county selectors and he was left wing-back on the Dublin minor team that won the All-Ireland Championship in 1958 when Mayo were beaten in the final. Kissane captained the team to a second successive title the following year before lining out with the Dublin junior team in 1960. He dropped out of Gaelic football the following year but was coaxed out of his premature retirement and made his Dublin senior team debut in the National League against Louth in November 1962. Kissane won Leinster Championship medals in 1963 and 1965. He was part of the Dublin squad that defeated Galway in the 1963 All-Ireland final.

== Honours ==
St. Vincent's

- Dublin Senior Football Championship: 1962, 1964, 1966, 1967, 1970

Dublin

- All-Ireland Senior Football Championship: 1963
- Leinster Senior Football Championship: 1963, 1965
- All-Ireland Minor Football Championship: 1958, 1959
- Leinster Minor Football Championship: 1958, 1959

Achievements
Preceded by Des Foley	All-Ireland Minor Football Final winning captain 1959	Succeeded by Seán Cleary
