= Gerry Davey (Gaelic footballer) =

Irish Gaelic footballer (born 1943)

Personal information
- Native name: Gearóid Mac Dáibhí (Irish)
- Born: 1943 (age 82–83) Dublin, Ireland
- Height: 5 ft 9 in (175 cm)

Sport
- Sport: Gaelic football
- Position: Left wing-forward
Club
- Years: Club
- Clanna Gael
Club titles
- Dublin titles: 1
Inter-county
- Years: County
- 1962-1969: Dublin
Inter-county titles
- Leinster titles: 2
- All-Irelands: 1
- NFL: 0

Gerard F. Davey (born 1943) is an Irish retired Gaelic footballer who played for club side Clanna Gael and at inter-county level with the Dublin senior football team.

== Career ==
After being overlooked by the Dublin minor and junior selectors, Davey first came to senior inter-county notice when he played a challenge game against Roscommon in October 1962. He went on to win Leinster Championship medals in 1963 and 1965, however, the highlight of his inter-county career was the 1963 All-Ireland final defeat of Galway. Davey also won a County Championship title with the Clanna Gael club.

== Honours ==
Clanna Gael

- Dublin Senior Football Championship: 1968

Dublin

- All-Ireland Senior Football Championship: 1963
- Leinster Senior Football Championship: 1963, 1965
