= Paddy Holden =

Irish Gaelic footballer (1940–2023)

Patrick Holden
Personal information
- Native name: Pádraig Ó hÚldáin (Irish)
- Born: 1940 Cabra, Dublin, Ireland
- Died: 19 October 2023 (aged 82–83)
- Height: 5 ft 11 in (180 cm)

Sport
- Sport: Gaelic football
- Position: Centre-back
Club
- Years: Club
- Clanna Gael
Club titles
- Dublin titles: 1
Inter-county
- Years: County
- 1958-1965: Dublin
Inter-county titles
- Leinster titles: 3
- All-Irelands: 1
- NFL: 0

Patrick A. Holden (1940 – 19 October 2023) was an Irish Gaelic footballer who played for club side Clanna Gael and at inter-county level with the Dublin senior football team.

== Career ==
Holden's performances at club level for Clanna Gael quickly brought him to the notice of the county selectors and he was full-back on the Dublin minor team that won the All-Ireland Championship in 1958 when Mayo were beaten in the final. Promotion to the Dublin junior team followed, however, he was deprived of a winners' medal in that grade by Fermanagh in 1959. Holden had been training with the Dublin senior team since October 1958 and made his debut in the National League against Roscommon in the autumn of 1959. He won back-to-back Leinster Championship medals in 1962 and 1963, and he was part of the team that won the 1963 All-Ireland final by defeating Galway. Holden ended his career with a third provincial winners' medal in 1965, while he also won back-to-back Railway Cup medals with Leinster. He continued to line out with his club until 1973, by which time he had also secured a County Championship title.

Holden died on 19 October 2023, at the age of 82–83.

== Honours ==
Clanna Gael

- Dublin Senior Football Championship: 1968

Dublin

- All-Ireland Senior Football Championship: 1963
- Leinster Senior Football Championship: 1962, 1963, 1965
- Leinster Junior Football Championship: 1959
- All-Ireland Minor Football Championship: 1958
- Leinster Minor Football Championship: 1958

Leinster

- Railway Cup: 1961, 1962
