= Seán Coen =

Irish Gaelic footballer

Personal information
- Native name: Seán Ó Cadhain (Irish)
- Nickname: Blackie
- Born: 1941 (age 84–85) Dublin, Ireland
- Occupation: Sculptor

Sport
- Sport: Gaelic football
- Position: Left wing-forward
Club
- Years: Club
- St. Vincent's
Inter-county
- Years: County
- 1961-1964: Dublin
Inter-county titles
- Leinster titles: 2
- All-Irelands: 1
- NFL: 0

Seán Coen (born 1941) is an Irish retired Gaelic footballer who played for club side St. Vincent's and at inter-county level with the Dublin senior football team.

== Career ==
A member of the St. Vincent's club, Coen first came to prominence on the inter-county scene with the Dublin minor team that won the All-Ireland Championship in 19589 hen Cavan were beaten in the final. He immediately progressed onto the county junior team that won the All-Ireland Junior Championship title in 1960. After joining the Dublin senior team, Coen won Leinster Championship medals in 1962 and 1963, however, the highlight of his inter-county career was being selected as a substitute for the 1963 All-Ireland final defeat of Galway.

== Honours ==
Dublin

- All-Ireland Senior Football Championship: 1963
- Leinster Senior Football Championship: 1962, 1963
- All-Ireland Junior Football Championship: 1960
- Leinster Junior Football Championship: 1960
- All-Ireland Minor Football Championship: 1959
- Leinster Minor Football Championship: 1959
