= Enda Colleran =

Galway Gaelic footballer and manager

Personal information
- Native name: Éinde Ó Callaráin (Irish)
- Born: May 1942 Moylough, County Galway, Ireland
- Died: 8 April 2004 (aged 61) Barna, County Galway, Ireland
- Occupation: Secondary school teacher
- Height: 5 ft 11 in (180 cm)

Sport
- Sport: Gaelic football
- Position: Right Corner Back
Club
- Years: Club
- Mountbellew–Moylough
Club titles
- Galway titles: 2
College
- Years: College
- 1961-1966: University College Galway
College titles
- Sigerson titles: 2
Inter-county
- Years: County
- 1961–1971: Galway
Inter-county titles
- Connacht titles: 6
- All-Irelands: 3
- NFL: 1

Enda Colleran (May 1942 – 8 April 2004) was an Irish Gaelic footballer and manager who played for the Mountbellew–Moylough club and at senior level for the Galway county team.

== Career ==
A native of Moylough, Colleran's Gaelic football prowess was first noticed on the national stage in 1960 when he won an All-Ireland Minor Championship medal with Galway and a Hogan Cup medal with St Jarlath's College. Having made his Galway senior debut in 1961, he went on to play in four successive All-Ireland senior finals between 1963 and 1966, winning the latter three against Kerry (twice) and Meath. Colleran also picked up two Sigerson Cup medals with University College Galway and became only the fourth Connacht man to captain his province to Railway Cup success when they beat Ulster in the 1967 final.

A brief spell as a rugby union player with Corinthians was followed by Colleran taking over as manager of the Galway senior team, winning a Connacht Championship title in 1976. His next high-profile engagement was as an analyst on The Sunday Game. Colleran was also named on the Team of the Century and Team of the Millennium.

== Personal life and death ==
Colleran worked as a secondary school teacher at St Enda's College in Salthill. He died suddenly at his home in Barna, County Galway on 8 April 2004.

== Honours ==
St Jarlath's College

- All-Ireland Colleges Senior Football Championship: 1960
- Connacht Colleges Senior Football Championship: 1960

University College Galway

- Sigerson Cup: 1963, 1964

Mountbellew–Moylough

- Galway Senior Football Championship: 1964, 1965

Galway Corinthians

- Connacht Senior Cup: 1971–72

Galway

- All-Ireland Senior Football Championship: 1964, 1965, 1966
- Connacht Senior Football Championship: 1963, 1964, 1965, 1966, 1968, 1970
- National Football League: 1964–65
- All-Ireland Minor Football Championship: 1960
- Connacht Minor Football Championship: 1960

Connacht

- Railway Cup: 1967

Sporting positions
Preceded by	Galway Senior Football Captain; 1965–1966	Succeeded by John Keenan
Preceded by John Donnellan	Galway Senior Football Manager; 1975–1977	Succeeded by Tom Sands
Achievements
Preceded by John Donnellan	All-Ireland SFC winning captain 1965–1966	Succeeded by Peter Darby
Preceded by Jim McCartan	Railway Cup Football Final winning captain 1967	Succeeded by Joe Lennon
