= Éamonn Breslin =

Irish Gaelic footballer (1940–2021)

Personal information
- Native name: Éamonn Ó Breasláin (Irish)
- Born: 1940 Ballyfermot, Dublin, Ireland
- Died: 9 February 2021 (aged 80) Castleknock, Dublin, Ireland
- Occupation: Car salesman

Sport
- Sport: Gaelic football
- Position: Right wing-forward
Clubs
- Years: Club
- Ballyfermot Gaels; Inchicore Hibernians
Club titles
- Dublin titles: 0
Inter-county
- Years: County
- 1963-1968: Dublin
Inter-county titles
- Leinster titles: 2
- All-Irelands: 1
- NFL: 0

Edward J. Breslin (1940 – 9 February 2021), known as Éamonn Breslin, was an Irish Gaelic footballer who played as a forward for club sides Inchicore Hibernians and Ballyfermot Gaels and was a member of the Dublin senior football team from 1963 until 1968.

== Career ==
Breslin played his Gaelic football for Inchicore Hibernians and Ballyfermot Gaels, with both teams participating in the Dublin Junior Championship. He earned a call-up to the Dublin senior football team and was an unused substitute on the team that beat Galway in the 1963 All-Ireland final. He also claimed two Leinster Championship titles. Breslin is probably best remembered for becoming the first player to score a headed goal in Gaelic football, a feat he achieved in a National League game against Laois in November 1964. His inter-county career was short-lived and he switched to rugby not long after scoring his famous goal, joining the Monkstown club in south Dublin.

== Personal life and death ==
Having served his time as a bricklayer, Breslin subsequently worked as a car salesman and finished his career with Fort Motors in Cromwellsfort Road in South Dublin in 2006. He died on 9 February 2021.

== Honours ==
Dublin

- All-Ireland Senior Football Championship: 1963
- Leinster Senior Football Championship: 1963, 1965
