= Simon Behan =

Irish Gaelic footballer

Personal information
- Native name: Síomón Ó Beacháin (Irish)
- Born: 1941 Marino, Dublin, Ireland
- Died: 26 January 2009 (aged 67) Baldoyle, Dublin, Ireland
- Occupations: Advertising and PR executive
- Height: 5 ft 10 in (178 cm)

Sport
- Sport: Gaelic football
- Position: Right wing-back
Club
- Years: Club
- St. Vincent's
Club titles
- Dublin titles: 3
Inter-county
- Years: County
- 1961-1968: Dublin
Inter-county titles
- Leinster titles: 1
- All-Irelands: 1
- NFL: 0

Simon P. Behan (1941 – 26 January 2009) was an Irish Gaelic footballer who played for club side St. Vincent's and at inter-county level with the Dublin senior football team.

== Career ==
A product of the first-ever Hogan Cup-winning St. Joseph's CBS team, Behan's performances quickly brought him to the notice of the county selectors and he was a substitute on the Dublin minor team that won the All-Ireland Championship in 1958 when Mayo were beaten in the final. Behan broke onto the minor starting fifteen and claimed a second successive title the following year before lining out with the Dublin junior team in 1960. Around this time he also win the first of three County Championship titles with St. Vincent's before being included on the Dublin senior team. Behan won a Leinster Championship medals in 1963, and he was part of the team that won the 1963 All-Ireland final by defeating Galway.

== Personal life and death ==
Born in Marino, Behan spent nearly 40 years as an Advertising and Public Relations Executive with Texaco. He died at his home in Baldoyle on 26 January 2009.

== Honours ==
St. Joseph's CBS

- All-Ireland Colleges Senior Football Championship: 1959
- Leinster Colleges Senior Football Championship: 1959

St. Vincent's

- Dublin Senior Football Championship: 1962, 1964, 1967

Dublin

- All-Ireland Senior Football Championship: 1963
- Leinster Senior Football Championship: 1963
- All-Ireland Minor Football Championship: 1958, 1959
- Leinster Minor Football Championship: 1958, 1959
