= Bill Casey (Dublin Gaelic footballer) =

Irish Gaelic footballer (born 1939)

Personal information
- Native name: Liam Ó Cathasaigh (Irish)
- Born: 1939 (age 86–87) Dublin, Ireland
- Height: 5 ft 11 in (180 cm)

Sport
- Sport: Gaelic football
- Position: Left corner-back
Club
- Years: Club
- Na Fianna
Club titles
- Dublin titles: 1
Inter-county
- Years: County
- 1963-1965: Dublin
Inter-county titles
- Leinster titles: 2
- All-Irelands: 1
- NFL: 0

Bill Casey (born 1939) is an Irish retired Gaelic footballer who played for club side Na Fianna and at inter-county level with the Dublin senior football team.

== Career ==
Casey first came to prominence as a member of the Dublin minor team that won back-to-back Leinster Championship titles in 1960 and 1961. While still eligible for the minor grade he was drafted onto the Dublin junior team before making his senior debut against Laois in the National League. Casey won Leinster Senior Football Championship medals in 1963 and 1965. He was part of the team that beat Galway to win the 1963 All-Ireland final. He also claimed a County Championship title with Na Fianna in 1969.

== Honours ==
Na Fianna

- Dublin Senior Football Championship: 1969

Dublin

- All-Ireland Senior Football Championship: 1963
- Leinster Senior Football Championship: 1963, 1965
