= 1958 All-Ireland Minor Football Championship =

Gaelic football competition

Championship details

All-Ireland Champions
- Winning team: Dublin (6th win)
- Captain: Des Foley

All-Ireland Finalists
- Losing team: Mayo
- Captain: Tom Rochford

Provincial Champions
- Munster: Kerry
- Leinster: Dublin
- Ulster: Down
- Connacht: Mayo

The 1958 All-Ireland Minor Football Championship was the 27th staging of the All-Ireland Minor Football Championship, the Gaelic Athletic Association's premier inter-county Gaelic football tournament for boys under the age of 18.

Meath entered the championship as defending champions, however, they were defeated in the Leinster Championship.

On 28 September 1958, Dublin won the championship following a 2-10 to 0-8 defeat of Mayo in the All-Ireland final. This was their sixth All-Ireland title overall and their first in two championship seasons.

== Results ==
=== Connacht Minor Football Championship ===
22 June 1958 Preliminary Round	Mayo	5-07 – 1-04	Sligo	James Stephens Park, Ballina

22 June 1958 Semi-Final	Roscommon	1-06 – 0-08	Leitrim	St Coman's Park, Roscommon

29 June 1958 Semi-Final	Mayo	4-13 – 1-04	Galway	Tuam Stadium, Galway

13 July 1958 Final	Mayo	1-08 – 1-04	Roscommon	St Coman's Park, Roscommon

=== Munster Minor Football Championship ===
13 July 1958 Final	Kerry	3-11 – 0-04	Waterford	Cork Athletic Grounds

=== Ulster Minor Football Championship ===
27 July 1958 Final	Down	3-09 – 3-01	Cavan	St Tiernach's Park, Clones

=== Leinster Minor Football Championship ===
20 July 1958 Final	Dublin	2-10 – 1-06	Louth	Páirc Tailteann, Navan
	L. Purcell, J. Sweeney 1-0 each, N. Fox 0-3, B. Beggs, P. Taylor 0-2 each, D. Foley, S. King (sub), B. McDonald 0-1 each		P. McKenna 1-0, J. Malone 0-3, P. McDonnell, B. O'Hare, J. Woods 0-1 each	Referee: J. Farrell (Kildare)

GK	1	Kieran Donnelly (Synge Street)
RCB	2	Noel Joyce (O'Connell Boys)
FB	3	Paddy Holden (Clanna Gael)
LCB	4	Donal Mulligan (O'Toole's)
RHB	5	Derek Jones (St Brendan's, Loughshinny)
CHB	6	Tony Whelan (Synge Street)
LHB	7	Mick Kissane (St Vincent's)
MF	8	Des Foley (St Vincent's) (c)
MF	9	Tom O'Reilly (Na Fianna)
RHF	10	Paddy Taylor (St Agnes)
CHF	11	Brian McDonald (Synge Street)
LHF	12	Noel Fox (St Vincent's)
RCF	13	Jimmy Sweeney (Clanna Gael)
FF	14	Liam Purcell (Na Fianna)
LCF	15	Brian Beggs (Skerries Harps)

GK	1	Paddy Gallagher (Roche Emmets)
RCB	2	Tony Stafford (Naomh Mhuire)
FB	3	Anthony Kirwan (Dreadnots)
LCB	4	Ollie Kemp (Dundalk Gaels)
RHB	5	Séamus Hallinan (Newtown Blues)
CHB	6	Brian Mitchell (Clann Mhuire)
LHB	7	Tom Coleman (Baile Philib)
MF	8	Peter McKenna (Newtown Blues)
MF	9	Brian O'Hare (Dundalk Gaels)
RHF	10	Jim Malone (Hunterstown Rovers)
CHF	11	Kieran Judge (Newtown Blues)
LHF	12	Barney Carroll (Cooley Kickhams)
RCF	13	John Woods (Clann Mhuire)
FF	14	Davy Byrne (St Fursey's)
LCF	15	Paddy McDonnell (Newtown Blues)

=== All-Ireland Minor Football Championship ===
24 August 1958 Semi-Final	Mayo	4-05 - 3-05	Kerry	Croke Park, Dublin

31 August 1958 Semi-Final	Dublin	3-05 - 0-09	Down	Páirc Tailteann, Navan

28 September 1958 Final	Dublin	2-10 - 0-08	Mayo	Croke Park, Dublin
				Referee: P. Silke (Galway)

== Championship statistics ==
=== Miscellaneous ===
- Down win the Ulster Championship for the first time in their history.
