= 1960 All-Ireland Minor Football Championship =

Gaelic football competition

Championship details

All-Ireland Champions
- Winning team: Galway (2nd win)
- Captain: Seán Cleary

All-Ireland Finalists
- Losing team: Cork
- Captain: James (Jim) Travers

Provincial Champions
- Munster: Cork
- Leinster: Offaly
- Ulster: Down
- Connacht: Galway

The 1960 All-Ireland Minor Football Championship was the 29th staging of the All-Ireland Minor Football Championship, the Gaelic Athletic Association's premier inter-county Gaelic football tournament for boys under the age of 18.

Dublin entered the championship as defending champions, however, they were defeated in the Leinster Championship.

On 25 September 1960, Galway won the championship following a 4-9 to 1-5 defeat of Cork in the All-Ireland final. This was their second All-Ireland title overall and their first title in eight championship season.

== Results ==
=== Connacht Minor Football Championship ===
quarter-final	Galway	2-06 - 0-04	Mayo	Tuam Stadium, Galway

semi-final	Roscommon	5-09 - 2-05	Leitrim

semi-final	Galway	3-05 - 0-07	Sligo

Final	Galway	4-11 - 0-03	Roscommon

=== Leinster Minor Football Championship ===
31 July 1960 Final	Offaly	1-12 - 1-05	Louth	Croke Park, Dublin
	Shaughnessy 0-07 (3f), Furlong 1-01, Scully 0-02, O'Brien, Donoghue 0-01 each		Dolan 1-0, Ryan 0-03 (1f), Campbell 0-01, Mohan 0-01 (f)	Referee: J. Kavanagh (Kildare)

GK	1	Paddy Merrigan (St Conleth's)
RCB	2	Jimmy Kelly (Walsh Island)
FB	3	Charlie Daly (Cappincur)
LCB	4	Mick Bracken (Tullamore)
RHB	5	Christy McGrath (St Conleth's)
CHB	6	Pat Heffernan (Tullamore) (c)
LHB	7	Gabriel Hayden (Tullamore)
MF	8	Martin Turley (Gracefield)
MF	9	Brendan Donoghue (St Mary's)
RHF	10	Dick Shaughnessy (Walsh Island)
CHF	11	Mick Ennis (Tullamore)
LHF	12	Eamon Scully (Clara)
RCF	13	Noel O'Brien (Clara)
FF	14	Tom Furlong (Tullamore)
LCF	15	Joe Wrafter (Tullamore)
Substitutes:
	16	Michael Rouse (Tullamore) for Donoghue

GK	1	Mick Sherlock (Baile Philib)
RCB	2	Benny Grogan (Baile Philib)
FB	3	Pat Hanlon (Clann Mhuire)
LCB	4	Frank McArdle (Baile Philib)
RHB	5	Mick Foster (Clann Mhuire)
CHB	6	Willie Daly (Clan na Gael)
LHB	7	Val Murphy (Newtown Blues)
MF	8	Mick Briscoe (Newtown Blues)
MF	9	Muckle McKeown (O'Raghallaighs)
RHF	10	Seán Ryan (Clan na Gael)
CHF	11	Anthony Campbell (O'Raghallaighs)
LHF	12	Séamus Savage (Clann Mhuire)
RCF	13	Séamus Mohan (Pioneers)
FF	14	Séamus Dolan (O'Raghallaighs)
LCF	15	Seán McVeigh (Clann Mhuire)
Substitutes:
	16	Jack McAuley (Parnells, Drogheda) for McKeown

=== All-Ireland Minor Football Championship ===
Semi-Finals

21 August 1960	Galway	2-12 - 2-03	Offaly	Croke Park, Dublin
				Referee: P. Rooney (Down)

7 August 1960	Cork	1-07 - 2-02	Down	Croke Park, Dublin
				Referee: M. McArdle (Louth)

Final

25 September 1960	Galway	4-09 - 1-05	Cork	Croke Park, Dublin
				Referee: M. McArdle (Louth)
