= Chris Kane =

Chris Kane may refer to:

- Chris Kane (footballer, born 1993), Scottish footballer (Heart of Midlothian, Dunfermline Athletic)
- Chris Kane (footballer, born 1994), Scottish footballer (St. Johnstone, Dumbarton, Queen of the South)
- Chris Kane (The Edge), The Edge character
- Chris Kane (politician), British MP

== See also ==
- Christian Kane (born 1974), American actor and singer
- Christopher Kane, fashion designer
- Christopher J. Kane, Irish Gaelic footballer
- Christopher Cain (disambiguation)
