= Pascal Flynn =

Irish Gaelic footballer (1937–2024)

Personal information
- Native name: Pascal Ó Floinn (Irish)
- Born: 1937 Saggart, Dublin, Ireland
- Died: September 16, 2024 (aged 86–87)
- Height: 5 ft 11 in (180 cm)

Sport
- Sport: Gaelic football
- Position: Goalkeeper
Club
- Years: Club
- St. Mary's
Club titles
- Dublin titles: 0
Inter-county
- Years: County
- 1957-1965: Dublin
Inter-county titles
- Leinster titles: 3
- All-Irelands: 1
- NFL: 0

Pascal Flynn (1937 – 16 September 2024) was an Irish Gaelic footballer who played for club side St. Mary's and at inter-county level with the Dublin senior football team.

== Career ==
Flynn joined the Dublin senior team in 1957. He took over from Paddy O'Flaherty as first-choice goalkeeper following his retirement in September 1959. Flynn won back-to-back Leinster Championship medals in 1962 and 1963, and was on the Dublin team that defeated Galway to win the 1963 All-Ireland Senior Football Championship final. Flynn ended his career with a third provincial winners' medal in 1965.

== Death ==
Flynn died on 16 September 2024.

== Honours ==
Dublin

- All-Ireland Senior Football Championship: 1963
- Leinster Senior Football Championship: 1962, 1963, 1965
