= Noel Fox =

Noel Fox may refer to:

- Noel Peter Fox, United States district judge
- Noel B. Fox, American lawyer and politician
- Noel Fox (Gaelic footballer), Irish Gaelic footballer
