= Noel Fox (Gaelic footballer) =

Irish Gaelic footballer

Personal information
- Native name: Nollaig Ó Sionnaigh (Irish)
- Born: 1940 (age 85–86) Dublin, Ireland
- Occupation: Company executive
- Height: 5 ft 9 in (175 cm)

Sport
- Sport: Gaelic football
- Position: Left corner-forward
Club
- Years: Club
- St. Vincent's
Inter-county
- Years: County
- 1961-1965: Dublin
Inter-county titles
- Leinster titles: 3
- All-Irelands: 1
- NFL: 0

Noel Fox (born 1940) was an Irish Gaelic footballer who played for club side St. Vincent's and at inter-county level with the Dublin senior football team.

== Career ==
Fox first came to prominence on the inter-county scene during a three-year stint with the Dublin minor team. He won an All-Ireland Championship in his final year in 1958 when Mayo were beaten in the final. Promotion to the Dublin senior team followed. Fox won back-to-back Leinster Championship medals in 1962 and 1963, and he was part of the Dublin squad that won the 1963 All-Ireland final by defeating Galway. He ended his career with a third provincial winners' medal in 1965.

== Honours ==
Dublin

- All-Ireland Senior Football Championship: 1963
- Leinster Senior Football Championship: 1962, 1963, 1965
- All-Ireland Minor Football Championship: 1958
- Leinster Minor Football Championship: 1958
