= Noel Tierney =

Galway Gaelic footballer (1942–2024)

Personal information
- Native name: Nollaig Ó Tiarnaigh (Irish)
- Born: 2 February 1942 Milltown, County Galway, Ireland
- Died: 10 November 2024 (aged 82) Galway, Ireland
- Occupation: Dairy farmer
- Height: 1.81 m (5 ft 11 in)

Sport
- Sport: Gaelic football
- Position: Full-back
Clubs
Years	Club	Apps (scores)
1962–1976	Garrymore; Milltown	29 (0–04)
Club titles
- Galway titles: 1
Inter-county
- Years: County
- 1963–1969: Galway
Inter-county titles
- Connacht titles: 5
- All-Irelands: 3
- NFL: 1
- All Stars: 2 (Cú Chulainn Award)

Noel Tierney (2 February 1942 – 10 November 2024) was an Irish Gaelic footballer. At club level he played with Garrymore and Milltown, while he was also a member of the Galway senior football team.

== Career ==
Tierney began playing Gaelic football with the Garrymore club in south Mayo, however, he subsequently transferred to the Milltown club. Success was immediate, with Tierney winning a divisional minor title in 1960 before winning a Galway JFC medal in 1961.

On the inter-county scene, Tierney first play for Galway during a two-year stint with the minor team. He won back-to-back Connacht SFC medals before ending his minor with a 4-09 to 1-05 defeat of Cork in the 1960 All-Ireland minor final. Progression to the senior team soon followed and he won the first of four successive Connacht SFC medals in 1963. Tierney also made four successive All-Ireland final appearances at this time, with victories in 1964, 1965 and 1966. He also claimed a National League medal in 1965 before ending his inter-county career with a fifth Connacht SFC medal in 1968.

Tierney's performances at inter-county level earned his selection to the Connacht team. He won two Railway Cup medals, including one as team captain in 1969. Tierney brought his inter-county career to an end at the age of 27, however, he continued to line out at club level. He won a Galway SFC medal in 1971.

== Recognition ==
Tierney's performances for Galway earned him consecutive Cú Chulainn Awards in 1963 and 1964. He was also named Footballer of the Year in 1964. Tierney was inducted into the Galway Football Hall of Fame in 1993. He received the ultimate accolade in 1999 when he was selected in the full-back position on the Galway Football Team of the Millennium.

His achievements were acknowledged at a special event in 2024 marking 60 years since he won his first of three All Ireland medals. His home club of Milltown made a presentation to him in the company of family, friends and supporters.

== Death ==
Tierney died after a period of ill health on 10 November 2024, at the age of 82.

== Honours ==
Milltown

- Galway Senior Football Championship: 1971
- Galway Junior Football Championship: 1961
- Galway North Board Minor Football Championship: 1960 (c)

Galway

- All-Ireland Senior Football Championship: 1964, 1965, 1966
- Connacht Senior Football Championship: 1963, 1964, 1965, 1966, 1968
- National Football League: 1964–65
- All-Ireland Minor Football Championship: 1960
- Connacht Minor Football Championship: 1959, 1960

Connacht

- Railway Cup: 1967, 1969 (c)

Individual

- Galway Football Team of the Millennium: 1999
- Caltex Footballer of the Year: 1964
- Galway Football Hall of Fame Inductee: 1993
- Cú Chulainn Award: 1963, 1964

Awards
Preceded by Lar Foley	Caltex Footballer of the Year; 1964	Succeeded by Martin L. Newell
