= Leo Hickey =

Irish Gaelic footballer

Personal information
- Native name: Leo Ó hÍcí (Irish)
- Born: 1939 (age 86–87) Ballyboughal, County Dublin, Ireland
- Height: 6 ft 3 in (191 cm)

Sport
- Sport: Gaelic football
- Position: Full-back
Club
- Years: Club
- Ballyboughal
Club titles
- Dublin titles: 0
Inter-county
- Years: County
- 1961-1964: Dublin
Inter-county titles
- Leinster titles: 2
- All-Irelands: 1
- NFL: 0

Leo Hickey (born 1939) is an Irish retired Gaelic footballer who played for club side Ballyboughal and at inter-county level with the Dublin senior football team.

== Career ==
Hickey first came to prominence in 1961 with the Final League selection in the Dublin County Championship and was full-back on that year's Dublin junior team. Shortly after this he was named full-back on the Dublin senior team for an O'Byrne Cup game against Longford. Hickey won back-to-back Leinster Championship medals in 1962 and 1963, and was in the Dublin inter-county side that won the 1963 All-Ireland final against Galway.

== Honours ==
Dublin

- All-Ireland Senior Football Championship: 1963
- Leinster Senior Football Championship: 1962, 1963
