= Christopher Cain (disambiguation) =

Christopher Cain is an American screenwriter and actor.

Christopher or Chris Cain may also refer to:

- Chris Cain, American guitarist
- Chris Cain (We Are Scientists)

== See also ==
- Chris Kane (disambiguation)
