= Des McKane =

Irish Gaelic footballer

Personal information
- Native name: Deasún Mac Catháin (Irish)
- Born: 1939 (age 86–87) Dublin, Ireland
- Height: 6 ft 0 in (183 cm)

Sport
- Sport: Gaelic football
- Position: Right wing-back
Club
- Years: Club
- St. Vincent's
Club titles
- Dublin titles: 5
Inter-county
- Years: County
- 1960-1964: Dublin
Inter-county titles
- Leinster titles: 2
- All-Irelands: 1
- NFL: 0

Desmond P. McKane (born 1939) is an Irish retired Gaelic footballer who played for club side St. Vincent's and at inter-county level with the Dublin senior football team.

== Career ==
McKane first came to prominence after joining the St. Vincent's club from the O'Connell's Boys' Club. He lined out during a golden era for the club and won five County Championship titles in six seasons. McKane first played for the Dublin senior team in 1960 and, after initially lining out at midfield, eventually found his best position at wing-back. He won back-to-back Leinster Championship medals in 1962 and 1963, however, the highlight of his brief inter-county career was the 1963 All-Ireland final defeat of Galway.

== Honours ==
St. Vincent's

- Dublin Senior Football Championship: 1959, 1960, 1961, 1962, 1964

Dublin

- All-Ireland Senior Football Championship: 1963
- Leinster Senior Football Championship: 1962, 1963
