= Christy Tyrrell =

Irish Gaelic footballer

Personal information
- Born: 1943 (age 82–83) Kilkerrin
- Occupations: secondary school teacher, principal
- Height: 5 ft 8 in (173 cm)

Sport
- Sport: Gaelic football, handball & golf
- Position: Right corner-forward
Club
- Years: Club
- 1960s-1970s: Kilkerrin/Clonberne Mountbellew-Moylough
College titles
- Sigerson titles: 2
Inter-county
- Years: County
- 1964-1966: Galway
Inter-county titles
- Connacht titles: 3
- All-Irelands: 3
- NFL: 1

Christy Tyrrell (born December 1943) from Kilkerrin, Co Galway, is a former Irish Gaelic football player. He played with his local club Kilkerrin/Clonberne and at an inter-county level with the "Galway three-in-a-row" All-Ireland Senior Football Championship winning team in 1964-1966.

== Sporting Career ==
Tyrrell played junior football with his local club Kilkerrin/Clonberne in the 1950s, 1960s and 1970s. He also played senior football at the same time with two different area teams, Mountbellew-Moylough and St Paul's (both of which were amalgamations), winning two senior county titles with Mountbellew–Moylough in 1964 and 1965. Tyrrell played with the Galway 1960 All-Ireland winning minor team. He later won two Sigerson medals with University College Galway in 1962 and 1963. Tyrrell captained the Galway U-21 team to win the Connacht title in the first year of the competition in 1964. He was first selected on the Galway senior team in November 1963. He went on to be a member of the Galway senior team in 1964, 1965 and 1966 winning three All-Ireland senior medals, three Connacht senior medals and a national league medal. A wrist injury contributed to his inter-county career ending in the winter of 1966.

Tyrrell also had success in handball winning two inter-varsity titles with University College Galway. He also partnered Bosco McDermott in winning an All-Ireland Pierce Purcell title with Galway Golf Club in 1974.

== Honours ==
Galway

- All-Ireland Senior football Championship: 1964, 1965, 1966
- Connacht Senior Football Championship: 1964, 1965, 1966
- National Football League: 1964/1965
- All-Ireland Minor championship: 1960

University College Galway

- Sigerson Cup: 1962, 1963

Mountbellew-Moylough

- Galway senior football championship: 1964, 1965
