= Lar Foley =

Irish hurler and Gaelic footballer

Personal information
- Native name: Liam Ó Foghlú (Irish)
- Nickname: Lar
- Born: 23 November 1938 Dublin, Ireland
- Died: 4 May 2003 (aged 64)

Sport
- Football Position: Full Back
- Hurling Position: Full Back
Clubs
- Years: Club
- 1956-1976 1956-1976: St Vincents (H); St Vincents (F)
Club titles
	Football	Hurling
Dublin titles	12	4
Leinster titles	2	0
All-Ireland titles	0	0
Inter-county
- Years: County
- c. 1958-1970 c. 1958-1970: Dublin (H); Dublin (F)
Inter-county titles
	Football	Hurling
Leinster Titles	5	1
All-Ireland Titles	2	0

Liam 'Lar' Foley (23 November 1938 – 4 March 2003) was a hurling and Gaelic football player from Dublin, Ireland, who played inter-county for Dublin and for the Dublin-based club St Vincents. He won two All-Ireland medals for Dublin in 1958 and 1963, and was named as Texaco Footballer of the Year in 1963.

== Biography ==
Foley lived in Kinsealy in North County Dublin. He and his Brother Des were cereal farmers and the sons of Patrick Foley of PK Foley Ltd - an early transportation Company well known in Dublin. They attended St. Joseph's Secondary C.B.S. in Fairview.

In the later part of Lar's life he developed a heart condition and died at home in Kinsealy of a heart attack during May 2003.

== Playing career ==
Lar Foley was awarded Texaco Footballer of the Year for performances in 1963.

=== Club ===
==== Football ====
Foley never experienced the glory of All-Ireland club final day success. Having featured on the team beaten by Erin's Hope in the 1956 county final, Lar went on to win a total of twelve Dublin Senior Football Championship, with six wins between 1957 and 1962 and again in 1964, 1966 and 1967 the three in a row between 1970 and 1972. Vincents took on Nemo Rangers in the 1973 final. It went to a replay before the Cork kingpins came out on top, Foley appearing as a substitute in both games. He had retired by the time St Vincent's won their first All-Ireland title three years later.

==== Hurling ====
He also had a successful hurling career with St Vincents, winning four Dublin Senior Hurling Championships, in 1957, 1960, 1962 and 1964.

=== Inter-county ===
==== Football ====
Foley's first taste of inter-county success came when he lined out at midfield for the 1955 and 1956 All-Ireland minor football finals, in which Dublin defeated Tipperary and Leitrim respectively, and came in as a substitute for the 1963 and 1964 Railway Cup final defeats at the hands of Ulster.

He first came to national attention on the senior team in 1958, when he featured at corner back on the Dublin side that pipped Derry in the All-Ireland senior football final. By the time he collected his second senior All-Ireland medal five years later, Foley had made the No.3 shirt his own.

Lar had his fair share of success at national league level. He had entered the fray as a substitute as Kildare were ousted in the 1957/58 decider and played against Down in the 1961/62 National Football league final. He was also on the Dublin team which defeated Down to win the 'home' final of 1963/64.

==== Hurling ====
Like his brother Des and many other St Vincent's players of that era, he was also already widely acclaimed as a dual-coder of exceptional ability. Both brothers featured (Lar at left corner back) in the 1961 All-Ireland Final when Dublin came agonisingly close to toppling a star-studded Tipperary side, losing by a single point, on a scoreline of 0-16 to 1-12.

Lar met with more luck at interprovincial level in the hurling code, however. He wore the No.4 jersey in three successive Railway Cup hurling finals, 1962–64, collecting winners medals in 1962 and 1964 but losing narrowly to Munster after a replay in the intervening year's showpiece.

== Managerial career ==
Foley served as Dublin Senior Hurling manager between 1989 and 1993.

Preceded by Mick O'Connell (Kerry)	Texaco Footballer of the Year; 1963	Succeeded by Noel Tierney (Galway)
