= Martin L. Newell =

Irish mathematician and sportsman

Martin Newell
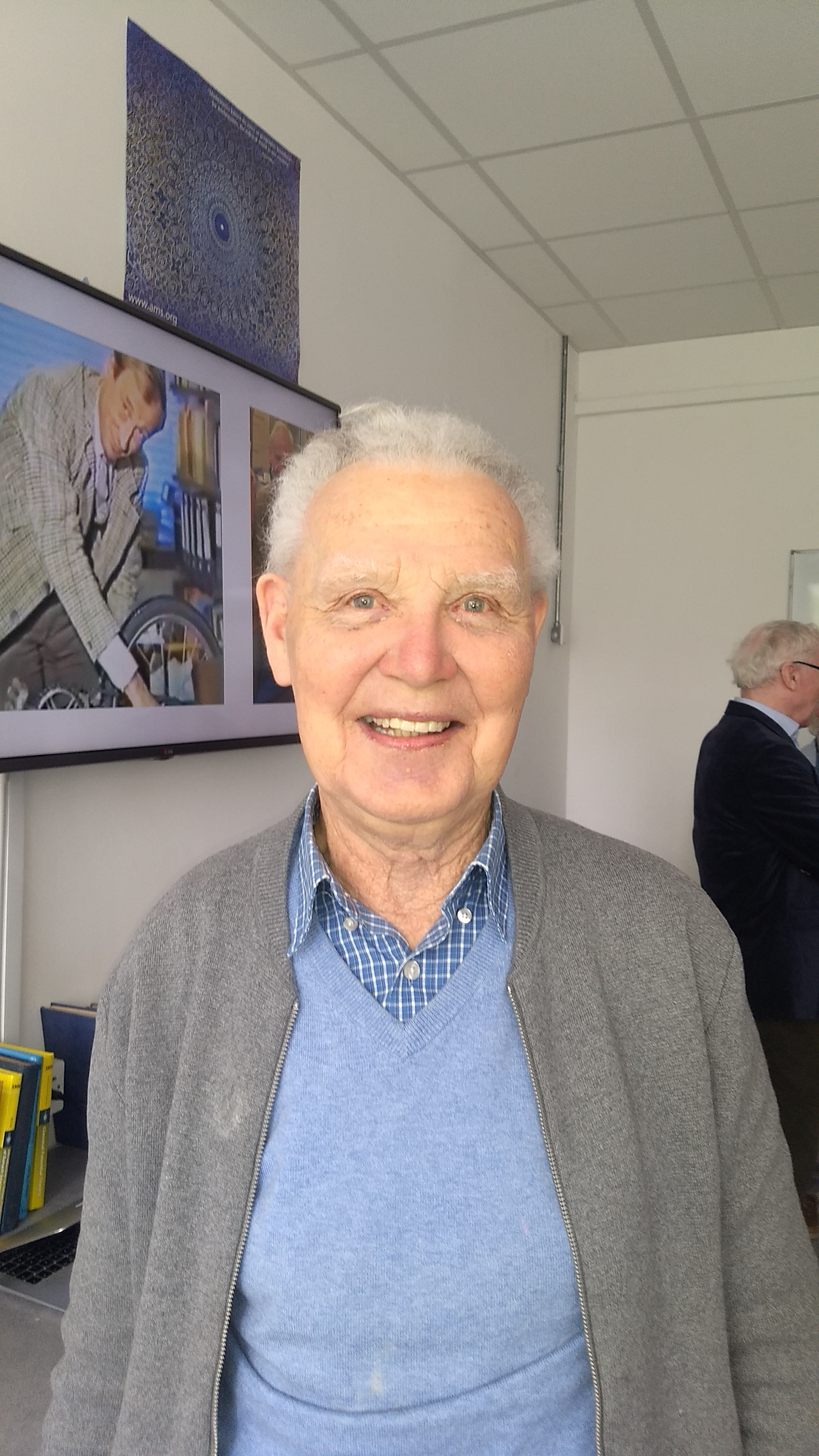
- Newell in May 2023

Personal information
- Native name: Máirtín Ó Tnúthail (Irish)
- Born: 1939 (age 86–87) Galway, Ireland
- Occupation: Lecturer
- Height: 5 ft 11 in (180 cm)

Sport
- Sport: Gaelic football
- Position: Midfield
Club
- Years: Club
- 1950s–1960s: Fr. Griffin's
Inter-county
- Years: County
- 1950s–1960s: Galway
Inter-county titles
- Connacht titles: 5
- All-Irelands: 3
- NFL: 1
- All Stars: 2

Martin Leonard Newell (born 1939 in Galway, Ireland) is an Irish retired mathematician and sportsman.

He earned his BSc and MSc in mathematical science at University College Galway before pursuing his PhD at Goethe University Frankfurt. He taught at Queen Mary College, in London, for three years, before returning to lecture at UCG (1969–2005). He has co-edited two conference proceedings on group theory: Infinite Groups 1994 (Walter de Gruyter, 1994, ISBN 3110143321) and Advances in Group Theory 2002 (Aracne, 2003, ISBN 8879995642).

Martin L. Newell is the son of mathematician Martin J. Newell, and is in turn the father of mathematician John Newell.

== Football career ==
Newell played at left-half-back on the Galway teams that won the All-Ireland Senior Football Championship finals of 1964, 1965 and 1966.

Awards
| Preceded by Noel Tierney (Galway) | Caltex Footballer of the Year; 1965 | Succeeded by Mattie McDonagh (Galway) |
