= Séamus Murphy (Gaelic footballer) =

Irish Gaelic footballer

Personal information
- Native name: Séamus Ó Murchú (Irish)
- Born: 1938 (age 87–88) Lispole, County Kerry
- Height: 5 ft 10 in (178 cm)

Sport
- Sport: Gaelic football
- Position: Right corner-back
Club
- Years: Club
- 1950s-1970s: Lispole
Inter-county
Years	County	Apps (scores)
1958-1971	Kerry	41 (0-10)
Inter-county titles
- Munster titles: 11
- All-Irelands: 4
- NFL: 4
- All Stars: 0

Séamus Murphy (born 1938 in Camp, County Kerry) is an Irish former sportsperson. He played Gaelic football with his local club Lispole and was a member of the Kerry senior inter-county team from 1958 until 1971.
