= 1964 All-Ireland Senior Football Championship =

Football championship

Championship details
- Dates: 3 May – 27 September 1964
- Teams: 30

All-Ireland Champions
- Winning team: Galway (5th win)
- Captain: John Donnellan
- Manager: John "Tull" Dunne (St Grellan's, Ballinasloe)

All-Ireland Finalists
- Losing team: Kerry
- Captain: Niall Sheehy

Provincial Champions
- Munster: Kerry
- Leinster: Meath
- Ulster: Cavan
- Connacht: Galway

Championship statistics
- No. matches played: 31
- Player of the Year: Noel Tierney (Galway)

The 1964 All-Ireland Senior Football Championship was the 78th staging of the All-Ireland Senior Football Championship, the Gaelic Athletic Association's premier inter-county Gaelic football tournament. The championship began on 26 April 1964 and ended on 27 September 1964.

Dublin entered the championship as the defending champions, however, they were defeated by Meath in the Leinster final.

It was Galway's second consecutive final, having lost to Dublin in the previous year's decider. The Tribesmen won their 5th All-Ireland title, beating Kerry by 5 points in the final, 0–15 to 0–10. It was the start of the most successful era in Galway football, their "Three In A Row".

== Leinster Championship format change ==
In 1964 only 2 Quarter-finals instead of the usual 4 were played in the Leinster football championship. The first round which contained just 2 matches and second round containing 3 matches was introduced the system lasted for just 1 year. It was to improve football in weaker counties.

== Results ==
=== Connacht Senior Football Championship ===
Quarter-finals

7 June 1964 Quarter-final	Leitrim	2–5 – 1–8	Roscommon	Páirc Seán Mac Diarmada, Carrick-on-Shannon

21 June 1964 Quarter-final replay	Roscommon	1–10 – 1–10 (aet)	Leitrim	St. Coman's Park, Roscommon

28 June 1964 Quarter-final second replay	Leitrim	1–10 – 5–9	Roscommon	Páirc Seán Mac Diarmada, Carrick-on-Shannon
	P McGarty 0–9, D Gannon 1–0, P Dolan 0–1.		PJ Watson 2–1, C Mahon 2–0, D Feeley 0–6, J Kelly 1–0, G O'Malley 0–1, T White 0–1.	Attendance: 10,000

Semi-finals

21 June 1964 Semi-final	Sligo	1–12 – 2–12	Galway	Markievicz Park, Sligo
				Attendance: 5,000

5 July 1964 Semi-final	Mayo	3–9 – 1–7	Roscommon	MacHale Park, Castlebar
	M Connaughton 1–2, F McDonald 0–4, D Doris 1–0, M Ruane 1–0, J Farragher 0–1, J Morley 0–1.		C Mahon 1–0, D Feeley 0–3, G White 0–1, P Watson 0–1, J Kelly 0–1, B Kyne 0–1.	Attendance: 15,000

Final

19 July 1964 Final	Galway	2–12 – 1–5	Mayo	Tuam Stadium, Tuam
	C Dunne 0–8, S Cleary 1–2, C Tyrrell 1–0, J Keegan 0–1, M McDonagh 0–1,		F McDonnell 1–2, J Farragher 0–1, J Langan 0–1, D Doris 0–1.	Attendance: 35,000; Referee: E Moulds (Wicklow)

=== Leinster Senior Football Championship ===
First round

26 April 1964 First round	Longford	0–8 – 0–12	Westmeath	Pearse Park, Longford
	B Burns 0–4, S Murray 0–2, P Gillen 0–1, S Donnelly 0–1.		P Collins 0–4, J Moran 0–3, T Dolan 0–2, G Kane 0–1, P Buckley 0–1, M Carley 0–1.

3 May 1964 First round	Carlow	3–7 – 2–9	Wicklow	Geraldine Park, Athy

Second round

24 May 1964 Second round	Dublin	1–14 – 1–5	Carlow	St. Conleth's Park, Newbridge
	J Timmons 1–5, S Coen 0–4, D Ferguson 0–2, D Foley 0–1, B McDonald 0–1, J Gilroy 0–1.		M Nolan 1–0, B Hayden 0–3, T Murphy 0–1, E Walker 0–1.

31 May 1964 Second round	Laois	2–8 – 0–13	Westmeath	O'Connor Park, Tullamore

31 May 1964 Second round	Louth	1–10 – 1–6	Wexford	Croke Park, Dublin
	L Leech 0–5, J Mohan 1–0, K Behan 0–2, B Gaughran 0–2, J Mulroy 0–1.		F Morris 1–1, S Keevans 0–4, M Bergin 0–1.	Referee: T Mooney (Meath)

Quarter-finals

7 June 1964 Quarter-final	Meath	2–12 – 0–8	Kildare	Croke Park, Dublin
	T Browne 1–2, G Quinn 1–2, J Walsh 0–4, D Carty 0–2, K McNamee 0–2.		P Dunny 0–3 H Fay 0–3, J O'Donnell 0–2.

14 June 1964 Quarter-final	Louth	1–9 – 1–4	Offaly	Croke Park, Dublin
	G Clifford 1–1, L Leech 0–4, K Behan 0–3, V Murphy 0–1.		J Kelly 1–0, J Mulligan 0–3, T Cullen 0–1.	Referee: P Kelly (Dublin)

Semi-finals

21 June 1964 Semi-final	Dublin	0–8 – 1–2	Laois	Croke Park, Dublin

28 June 1964 Semi-final	Meath	1–12 – 2–7	Louth	Croke Park, Dublin
	J Walsh 0–7, K McNamee 1–0, D Carty 0–3, T Browne 0–1, P Mullvaney 0–1.		K Behan 1–2, L leech 1–2, R Gaughran 0–2, S Ryan 0–1.	Referee: M Mangan (Dublin)

Final

26 July 1964 Final	Meath	2–12 – 1–7	Dublin	Croke Park, Dublin
	Ollie Shanley 1–3, Jimmy Walsh 0-4f, Paddy Mulvaney 1–0, Kevin McNamee 0–3, Dave Carty 0–2		Brian McDonald 1–2, Sean Coen 0-3f, Bill Casey and Des Ferguson 0–1 each	Attendance: 57,133; Referee: John Dowling (Offaly)

=== Munster Senior Football Championship ===
Quarter-final

14 June 1964 Quarter-final	Tipperary	2–5 – 1–7	Clare	Gaelic Grounds, Limerick
	G Danagher 1–2, L Boland 1–0, M Keating 0–2, J O'Donoghue 0–1.		T McGrath 1–0, R Pyne 0–2, T Daly 0–2, P McMahon 0–1, M Queally 0–1, M Canavan 0–1.	Referee: J. Sheehan (Dublin)

Semi-finals

14 June 1964 Semi-final	Waterford	1–2 – 2–8	Cork	Fraher Field, Dungarvan
			J.J. Murphy (1–2), Paul O'Sullivan (0–2) & Willie O'Leary (1–4).

28 June 1964 Semi-final	Tipperary	1–7 – 1–14	Kerry	Semple Stadium, Thurles
	P Conway 1–1, B Keating 0–4, J Donoghue 0–1, L Connolly 0–1.		B O'Callaghan 0–8, D O'Donnell 1–0, M O'Connell 0–2, T Barrett 0–2, M Fleming 0–1, P griffin 0–1.	Referee: D. White (CIare)

Final

19 July 1964 Final	Cork	1–8 – 2–11	Kerry	Cork Athletic Grounds, Cork
	Willie O'Leary 1–4 (0-3f), Mick Bohane, Flor Hayes, Johnny Carroll, JJ Murphy 0–1 each		Dom O'Donnell 2–1, Bernie O'Callaghan 0-6f, Mick O'Connell (0-1f), Mick Fleming, Tony Barrett, Frank O'Leary 0–1 each	Attendance: 26,023; Referee: J Hatton (Wicklow)

=== Ulster Senior Football Championship ===
Preliminary round

31 May 1964 Preliminary round	Tyrone	0–8 – 1–9	Antrim	O'Neill Park, Dungannon
	S McElroy 0–2, S O'Kane 0–2, P Forbes 0–1, M O'Neill 0–1, S O'Brien 0–1, M Donaghy 0–1.		G McRory 1–2, P Lynn 0–2, J O'Neill 0–2, S Rice 0–1, D Dougan 0–1, J Ward 0–1.	Referee: L Maguire (Monaghan)

Quarter-finals

7 June 1964 Quarter-final	Fermanagh	0–7 – 1–10	Donegal	St. Molaise Park, Irvinestown
				Attendance: 3,000

14 June 1964 Quarter-final	Cavan	3–9 – 2–3	Derry	Breffni Park, Cavan
	JJ O'Reilly 2–0, C Gallagher 0–5, M Cahill 1–1, B Sherlock 0–1, J O'Donnell 0–1, P Pritchard 0–1.		B Rafferty 1–0, C McGuigan 1–0, D Mullen 0–2, F Brolly 0–1.	Attendance: 2,000; Referee: M Mahon (Fermanagh)

14 June 1964 Quarter-final	Antrim	2–6 – 1–8	Armagh	Casement Park, Belfast
	S Rice 1–1, P Lynn 1–0, J McRory 0–3, J O'Neill 0–1, E Greeves 0–1.		J Whan 1–1, K Browne 0–4, E Casey 0–2, K Halpenny 0–1.	Referee: J Donaghy (Down)

21 June 1964 Quarter-final	Down	2–9 – 1–6	Monaghan	MacCumhaill Park, Ballybofey

Semi-finals

28 June 1964 Semi-final	Cavan	1–9 – 0–7	Donegal	St. Molaise Park, Irvinestown
	C Gallagher 0–6, Lynch 0–1, J O'Donnell 0–3.		Griffin 0–3, Flood 0–1, Campbell 0–1, McDevitt 0–1, McFeely 0–1.	Attendance: 8,000

5 July 1964 Semi-final	Down	2–8 – 1–9	Antrim	St. Tiernach's Park, Clones
	J McCartan 2–1, P Doherty 0–5, S O'Neill 0–2.		J Ward 1–0, J O'Neill 0–3, P Lynn 0–2, G McRory 0–1, S Rice 0–1, S McQuillan 0–1, D McNeill 0–1.	Referee: L Maguire (Monaghan)

Final

19 July 1964 Final	Cavan	2–10 – 1–10	Down	Casement Park, Belfast
	C Gallagher 0–8, P Pritchard 2–0, J O'Donnell 0–2.		P Doherty 0–5, J Lennon 1–0, B Johnston 0–2, S O'Neill 0–2, V Kane 0–1.	Attendance: 30,000

=== All-Ireland Senior Football Championship ===
Semi-finals

9 August 1964 Semi-final	Galway	1–8 – 0–9	Meath	Croke Park, Dublin
	M McDonagh 1–0, C Dunne 0–3, S Leydon 0–2, M Reynolds 0–1, J Keenan 0–1, S Cleary 0–1.		J Walsh 0–5, O Shanley 0–2, J Quinn 0–1, D Carty 0–1.	Referee: S Garvey (Cork)

23 August 1964 Semi-final	Kerry	2–12 – 0–6	Cavan	Croke Park, Dublin
	T Long 1–2, B O'Callaghan 0–5, M O'Dwyer 0–4, A Barrett 1–0, P Griffin 0–1.		C Gallagher 0–4, B Morris 0–1, P Pritchard 0–1.	Attendance: 45,578; Referee: J Dowling (Offaly)

Final

27 September 1964 Semi-final	Galway	0–15 – 0–10	Kerry	Croke Park, Dublin
	C Dunne 0–9, S Leydon 0–2, C Tyrrell 0–1, J Keenan 0–1, S Cleary 0–1, M McDonagh 0–1.		M O'Connell 0–7, P Griffin 0–2, M O'Dwyer 0–1.	Attendance: 76,498; Referee: J Hatton (Wicklow)

== Championship statistics ==
=== Miscellaneous ===
- The Carrick-on-Shannon ground is named after a 1916 rising leader this year as it is named Páirc Seán Mac Diarmada after Seán Mac Diarmada.
- Meath won the Leinster title for the first time since 1954.

=== Top scorers ===
Overall

Rank	Player	County	Tally	Total	Matches	Average
1	Noel Tierney	Galway			4	

Single game

Rank	Player	County	Tally	Total	Opposition
1					
