= Connacht Junior Football Championship =

Football Championship in Ireland

- Founded: 1906
- Title holders: Galway (22nd title)
- Most titles: Mayo (30 titles)

Flag of Connacht

The Connacht Junior Football Championship is a junior "knockout" competition in the game of Gaelic football played in the province of Connacht in Ireland. The series of games are organised by the Connacht Council. The competition began in 1906, with Mayo winning during the inaugural year. The most successful county to date is Mayo who have won on twenty nine occasions. The 2019 Connacht Junior Football champions are Galway. The winners of the Connacht Junior Football Championship each year progress to play the other provincial champions for a chance to win the All-Ireland Junior Football Championship.

== Teams ==
County	Championship titles	Last championship title
Galway	22	2019
Leitrim	7	2017
Mayo	30	2016
Roscommon	11	2009
Sligo	11	2014

== Roll of honour ==
#	County	Titles	Years won
1	Mayo	30	1907, 1913, 1914, 1924, 1925, 1927, 1930, 1933, 1934, 1936, 1937, 1950, 1951, 1953, 1955, 1957, 1963, 1967, 1978, 1970, 1971, 1993, 1995, 1997, 2001, 2002, 2007, 2012, 2015, 2016
2	Galway	22	1915, 1919, 1931, 1947, 1948, 1949, 1954, 1958, 1960, 1961, 1965, 1966, 1969, 1972, 1983, 1984, 1985, 1994, 1996, 2003, 2018, 2019
3	Roscommon	11	1929, 1932, 1939, 1940, 1959, 1964, 1999, 2000, 2006, 2008, 2009
3	Sligo	11	1926, 1928, 1935, 1956, 1973, 1998, 2005, 2010, 2011, 2013, 2014
5	Leitrim	7	1938, 1941, 1946, 1952, 1962, 2004, 2017

== List of finals ==
Year	Winners		Runners-up	
Year	County	Score	County	Score
2020–	No championship due to COVID-19			
2019	Galway	1-07	Mayo	0–09
2018	Galway	1–11	Mayo	1–10
2017	Leitrim	1–16	Mayo	0–16
2016	Mayo	1–11	Galway	0–12
2015	Mayo	1–12	Galway	0–13
2014	Sligo	0–09	Leitrim	0–06
2013	Sligo	0–15	Mayo	1–11
2012	Mayo	2–12	Galway	0–10
2011	Sligo	1–10	Mayo	1–09
2010	Sligo	0–09	Galway	0–08
2009	Roscommon	2–09	Mayo	0–10
2008	Roscommon	2–10	Leitrim	0–13
2007	Mayo	3–10	Sligo	2–07
2006	Roscommon	1–10	Mayo	0–11
2005	Sligo	0–12	Mayo	0–11
2004	Leitrim	0–12	Roscommon	1–08
2003	Galway	1–07	Roscommon	0–04
2002	Mayo	2–14	Leitrim	1–04
2001	Mayo	1–16	Leitrim	0–09
2000	Roscommon	2–08	Leitrim	0–08
1999	Roscommon	2–07	Galway	0–10
1998	Sligo	3–13	Roscommon	3–05
1997	Mayo	1–15	Roscommon	0–08
1996	Galway	1–10	Mayo	2–05
1995	Mayo	1–15	Galway	1–09
1994	Galway	0–12, 0–11 (R)	Mayo	1–09, 0–08 (R)
1993	Mayo	1–09	Leitrim	0–11
1992	Mayo *		N/A	
1991	Suspended			
1990	Suspended			
1989	Suspended			
1988	Suspended			
1987	Suspended			
1986	Suspended			
1985	Galway	1–09	Leitrim	0–06
1984	Galway	2–07	Mayo	0–07
1983	Galway	2–13	Leitrim	3–09
1982	Suspended			
1981	Suspended			
1980	Suspended			
1979	Suspended			
1978	Suspended			
1977	Suspended			
1976	Suspended			
1975	Suspended			
1974	Suspended			
1973	Sligo	4–08	Leitrim	1–04
1972	Galway	1–09	Mayo	1–04
1971	Mayo	0–06	Leitrim	0–04
1970	Mayo	1–11	Roscommon	1–10
1969	Galway	2–08	Sligo	0–04
1968	Mayo	3–10	Roscommon	1–10
1967	Mayo	1–11	Galway	2–05
1966	Galway	2–05	Roscommon	0–07
1965	Galway	6–17	Leitrim	0–01
1964	Roscommon	2–06, 0–08 (R)	Galway	2–06, 0–07 (R)
1963	Mayo	3–04	Galway	1–05
1962	Leitrim	2–11	Mayo	2–07
1961	Galway	2–12	Mayo	0–09
1960	Galway	3–05	Leitrim	0–10
1959	Roscommon	2–05	Galway	1–06
1958	Galway	3–11	Sligo	0–02
1957	Mayo	2–08	Galway	2–06
1956	Sligo	3–02	Mayo	2–03
1955	Mayo	3–06	Galway	0–02
1954	Galway	2–06	Roscommon	0–08
1953	Mayo	6–07	Galway	1–01
1952	Leitrim	2–07	Mayo	1–03
1951	Mayo	3–04	Leitrim	2–04
1950	Mayo	4–07	Roscommon	1–05
1949	Galway	3–09	Mayo	1–09
1948	Galway	4–11	Sligo	1–04
1947	Galway	4–10	Roscommon	2–06
1946	Leitrim	2–09	Galway	0–04
1945	Suspended			
1944	Suspended			
1943	Suspended			
1942	Suspended			
1941	Leitrim	3–09	Galway	1–07
1940	Roscommon	1–07	Mayo	2–01
1939	Roscommon	2–06	Mayo	1–04
1938	Leitrim	0–09	Galway	1–05
1937	Mayo	3–10	Galway	3–07
1936	Mayo	3–07	Sligo	2–03
1935	Sligo	2–02	Mayo	1–04
1934	Mayo	2–05	Roscommon	1–06
1933	Mayo	3–00	Galway	1–05
1932	Roscommon	4–06	Sligo	0–05
1931	Galway	3–08	Leitrim	0–03
1930	Mayo	2–09	Roscommon	3–02
1929	Roscommon	0–06 #	Galway	1–07
1928	Sligo	1–03	Mayo	0–01
1927	Mayo	3–12	Leitrim	0–04
1928	Sligo	1–03	Roscommon	0–01
1925	Mayo	3–05	Leitrim	1–00
1924	Mayo	1–04	Galway	0–01
1923	Suspended			
1922	Suspended			
1921	Suspended			
1920	Suspended			
1919	Galway	5–00	Leitrim	1–02
1918	Suspended			
1917	Suspended			
1916	Suspended			
1915	Galway	2–05	Mayo	1–04
19140	Mayo	1–03	Galway	1–02
1913	Mayo	2–06	Galway	0–00
1912	Suspended			
1911	Suspended			
1910	Suspended			
1909	Suspended			
1908	Suspended			
1907	Mayo	2–09	Galway	0–04

- 1992, Mayo represented Connacht in the All-Ireland Junior Football Championship semi-finals.
- 1929, Refixture following an objection. Roscommon without Galway scratch.

== See also ==
- Munster Junior Football Championship
- Leinster Junior Football Championship
- Ulster Junior Football Championship

== Sources ==
- Roll of Honour on gaainfo.com
- Complete Roll of Honour on Kilkenny GAA bible
