= Dunmore MacHales GAC =

Gaelic sports club in County Galway, Ireland

Dunmore MacHales
- Dún Mhór Mhic Eil
- Founded: 1887
- County: Galway
- Nickname: The Shafts
- Colours: Green and White
- Grounds: Dunmore (Páirc Mhic Éil) and Glenmore Park

Playing kits
Standard colours

Senior Club Championships
	All Ireland	Connacht champions	Galway champions
Football:	0	0	15

Dunmore MacHales GAA (Irish: CLG Dún Mhór Mhic Eil) is a Gaelic Athletic Association club based in Dunmore, County Galway, Ireland. The club is a member of Galway GAA. Teams at underage and Senior level play in the Galway League and Championships. Though the McHales are the first team to have won the Galway Senior Championship in 1889 the club has not won the Frank Fox cup in almost four decades, last winning the championship in 1983.

== History ==
They were the first team to win the Galway Senior Football Championship in 1889 and have had many victories in the competition ever since although their last senior county title was won in 1983. They last appeared in the final in 1997. They are fourth in the all-time list of most victories.

They had two great decades, the first coming from 1900 to 1912, and the 1960s when they won five of the ten championships. They contributed five players to the Galway team that won "three-in-a-row team" in 1964, 1965 and 1966.

For the first time since 1973, the club secured its first county Galway Minor Championship in September 2012 with a 2-10 to 2-06 victory over St James'.

On the 24th of October 2021 at Tuam Stadium, Dunmore MacHales GAA bridged a 48-Year gap for underage ‘A’ silverware.

The MacHales came through a dramatic penalty shoot-out to win the North Board U-19 ‘A’ Football title against Claregalway, securing a first underage ‘A’ title since 1973.

The game finished 1-06 to 0-09, after extra-time, in Tuam Stadium before Dunmore prevailed 4-2 on penalties.

== Notable players ==
- Michael Donnellan won an All-Ireland Senior Football Championship medal with the Galway Senior football team in 1925. He died in Croke Park at the 1964 All-Ireland final, shortly before his son, John Donnellan, as victorious Galway captain, received the Sam Maguire Cup. He captained the Galway winning team in 1964, the first of a historic "3 In A Row". His brother, Patrick (Pateen) was also on the team.
- Michael Donnellan, son on John Donnellan, won two All-Ireland titles in 1998 and 2001. The Armagh footballer Oisín McConville once said of him: "He was the best athlete I've ever played against". His run of the full length of the pitch to assist Seán Óg de Paor was voted the best moment in the history of GAA. He later moved to Salthill-Knocknacarra in 2003 and won an All-Ireland club medal in 2006.
- Conor Gleeson, who is from Dunmore and plays for both Galway and Dunmore scored the winning point in the 2024 Connnacht Gaa Football Senior Championship Final. As a goalie this is remarkable. It was a free 48 metres from the posts.

== Facilities ==
Páirc Mhic Éil is the home pitch of Dunmore MacHales since 1973, before this it was called "the Demesne" or "The Captain's".

== Honours ==
- Galway Senior Club Football Championship (15)
  - 1889, 1891, 1900, 1902, 1907, 1910, 1912, 1953, 1961, 1963, 1966, 1968, 1969, 1973, 1983
- Galway Intermediate Football Championship (1)
  - 2022
- Connacht Intermediate Club Football Championship (1)
  - 2022
- Galway Minor Football Championship (2)
  - 1973, 2012
- Galway U19 Football Championship (1)
  - 2021
