= Christopher J. Kane =

Irish Gaelic footballer and manager

Christopher J. Kane (born 1940 in Dublin), or Christy Kane, was a Gaelic footballer who played for the Dublin county team for more than a decade as left-full back. He was on the Dublin teams that won the 1960 All-Ireland Junior Football Championship and the 1963 All-Ireland Senior Football Championship. He was then captain of the team. Following his career as a player he was manager of Dublin GAA for many years.

When Kane retired from Gaelic football he went into the tourism industry but has since retired and now lives by the coast.

== Career ==
Kane competed at all three levels of Gaelic football, Minor, Junior and Senior, each time reaching the All-Ireland. He played left-full back for the Dublin at all three levels, for over a decade in total. He was also captain, then coach, then manager. When the Dublin GAA played at the All-Ireland Senior Football Championship in 1963 they faced Galway and won 1-9-0-10.
