= Seán Meade =

Irish Gaelic footballer

Personal information
- Native name: Seán Miach (Irish)
- Born: 1937 (age 88–89) Ballinasloe, County Galway
- Height: 5 ft 11 in (180 cm)

Sport
- Sport: Gaelic football
- Position: Centre-back
Club
- Years: Club
- 1950s-1970s: Ballinasloe
Inter-county
- Years: County
- 1950s-1960s: Galway
Inter-county titles
- Connacht titles: 6
- All-Irelands: 3
- NFL: 1
- All Stars: 0

Seán Meade (born 1937 in Ballinasloe, County Galway) is an Irish former sportsperson. He played Gaelic football with his local club Ballinasloe and was a member of the Galway senior inter-county team in the 1950s and 1960s.
