= John Keenan (Gaelic footballer) =

Irish Gaelic footballer

Personal information
- Native name: Seán Ó Cianáin (Irish)
- Born: 1942 (age 83–84) Dunmore, County Galway
- Height: 5 ft 10 in (178 cm)

Sport
- Sport: Gaelic football
- Position: Left corner-forward
Club
- Years: Club
- 1960s-1970s: Dunmore McHales
Inter-county
- Years: County
- 1961-1970: Galway
Inter-county titles
- Connacht titles: 6
- All-Irelands: 3
- NFL: 1

John Keenan (born 1942 in Dunmore, County Galway) is an Irish former sportsperson. He played Gaelic football with his local club Dunmore McHales and was a member of the Galway senior inter-county team from 1961 until 1970.
