= Bernie O'Callaghan =

Personal information
- Native name: Beircheart Ó Ceallacháin (Irish)
- Born: 1939 Moyvane, County Kerry, Ireland
- Died: 1998 (aged 58–59) Ballybunion, County Kerry, Ireland
- Occupation: Hotelier

Sport
- Sport: Gaelic football
- Position: Left wing-forward
Club
- Years: Club
- Moyvane
Club titles
- Kerry titles: 0
Inter-county
| Years | County | Apps (scores) |
| 1961–1965 | Kerry | 11 (5–39) |
Inter-county titles
- Munster titles: 3
- All-Irelands: 0
- NFL: 6
- All Stars: 0

Bernard O'Callaghan (1939–1998) was an Irish Gaelic football manager, selector and player. His league and championship career with the Kerry senior football team spanned six seasons from 1961 to 1966.

The Bernard O'Callaghan Memorial Senior Football Championship was renamed in his honor in 2000.
