= Seán Cleary =

Irish Gaelic footballer

Personal information
- Native name: Seán Mac Giolla Arraith (Irish)
- Born: 1942 (age 83–84) Ballygar, County Galway
- Height: 5 ft 10 in (178 cm)

Sport
- Sport: Gaelic football
- Position: Full-forward
Club
- Years: Club
- 1950s-1970s: Ballygar
Inter-county
- Years: County
- 1963-1969: Galway
Inter-county titles
- Connacht titles: 5
- All-Irelands: 3
- NFL: 1

Seán Cleary (born 1942 in Ballygar, County Galway) is an Irish former sportsperson. He played Gaelic football with his local club Ballygar and was a member of the Galway senior inter-county team from 1963 until 1969.
