= Clanna Gael Fontenoy GAA =

Gaelic games club in Dublin, Ireland

Clanna Gael Fontenoy
- Founded: 1968
- County: Dublin
- Colours: Blue, green, gold and white
- Grounds: Sean Moore Park, Sean Moore Road, Ringsend, Dublin 4
- Coordinates: 53.337689°N 6.216360°W

Playing kits
Standard colours

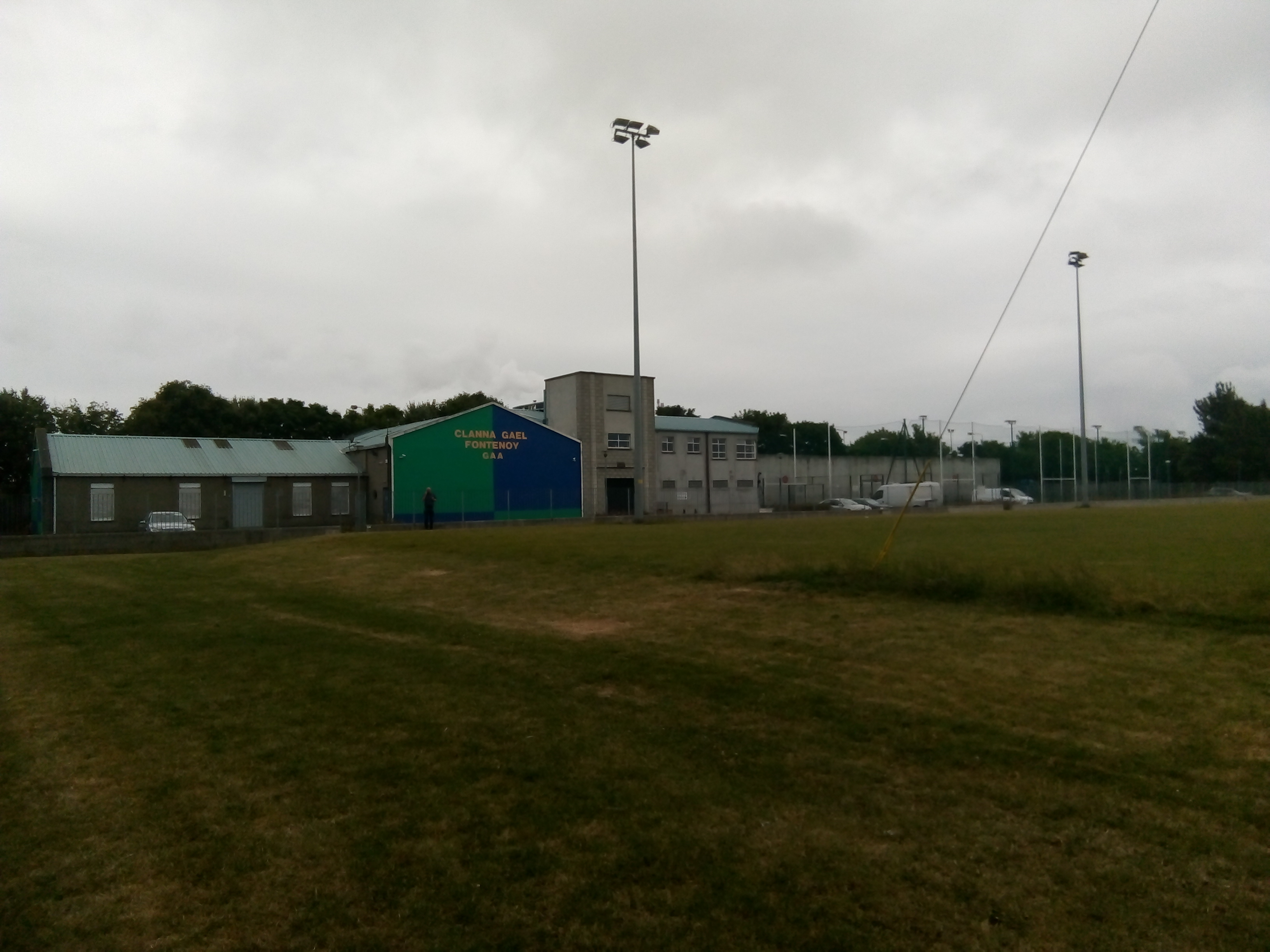
Sean Moore Park, Ringsend

Clanna Gael Fontenoy is a Gaelic Athletic Association club based at Irishtown, Dublin, Ireland, serving Sandymount, Irishtown, Ringsend and its surrounding areas.

== History ==
The club was founded in 1968 through the amalgamation of the Fontenoys (founded in 1892, named for the Battle of Fontenoy, where the Irish Brigade fought) and Clanna Gael (founded in 1929). Clanna Gael has played many matches at St Anne's Park in Raheny and Clontarf, but the main locus of the combined club has long been Ringsend.

== Achievements ==
- Dublin Junior 5 Football Championship: Winners 2025
- Dublin U21 H Football Championship Winners 2024
- Dublin Minor D Hurling Championship Winners 2021
- Dublin Minor D Football Championship Winners 2021
- Dublin Minor C Hurling League Winners 2019
- Dublin U16 C Football Championship Winners 2019
- Leinster Special Junior Hurling Championship Winners (1) 2012

== Catchment ==
The club's catchment area stretches from the inner city out to the inner suburbs and includes areas such as Dublin Docklands, Ringsend, Irishtown, Sandymount, Ballsbridge, Donnybrook and parts of Dublin 6.

== Facilities ==
Clanna Gael Fontenoy operates from Sean Moore Park where it has two full-size Prunty playing pitches with floodlights on both. The club also boasts an enclosed Astro Turf playing surface with a specially-constructed hurling wall. In addition, Clanna Gael Fontenoy has access to playing pitches in nearby Ringsend Park where the club originally operated from.

Clanna Gael Fontenoy is sponsored by Dublin Port.

== Players and wins ==
The club has over 1000 registered members and fields teams that compete in football, hurling and camogie at both juvenile and adult levels.

A number of their members have been and/or are part of the panel for Dublin teams including Rebecca McDonnell, Kim Flood, Serena Hannon, Rachael Byrne (Senior Ladies), Ella Thirroueiz (Ladies Minor) and Maria O'Dea (U16) with Karl Morgan and Colm O'Briain both part of the Dublin development squad.

In 2021, the club's Minor men's team won both the Minor Hurling D championship and the Minor Football D championship. And their U16 Boys won the U16 D Championship. In 2019 their U16 Boys won the U16 C Football championship. In 2016 and 2019 their Ladies Intermediate team were Championship winners and reached the Leinster Finals only to be narrowly beaten, their Junior E team won their Championship final and the U14 Girls won the Football Feile final. In 2015, their Camogie Senior 4 team won both the Shield and League finals while in 2014 their U14 boys won the Division 4 Feile football title.
