= Mick Garrett =

Irish Gaelic footballer

Personal information
- Native name: Mícheál Mac Gearóid (Irish)
- Born: 1 April 1937 (age 89) Scotstown, County Monaghan
- Height: 6 ft 0 in (183 cm)

Sport
- Sport: Gaelic football
- Position: Midfield
Club
- Years: Club
- 1950s-1970s: Tuam Stars
Inter-county
- Years: County
- 1957-1965: Galway
Inter-county titles
- Connacht titles: 7
- All-Irelands: 2
- NFL: 0

Mick Garrett (born 1937 in Scotstown, County Monaghan) is an Irish former sportsperson. He played Gaelic football with his local club Tuam Stars winning 7 county titles with them and was a member of the Galway senior inter-county team from 1959 until 1965. Mick Garrett was born in 1937 in Scotstown, County Monaghan
