= Bosco McDermott =

Irish Gaelic footballer

Personal information
- Native name: Seán Boscó Mac Diarmada (Irish)
- Born: 1936 (age 89–90) Dunmore, County Galway
- Height: 5 ft 10 in (178 cm)

Sport
- Sport: Gaelic football
- Position: Right corner-back
Clubs
- Years: Club
- 1950s-1960s 1960s-1970s: Dunmore; Williamstown
Inter-county
- Years: County
- 1950s-1960s: Galway
Inter-county titles
- Connacht titles: 5
- All-Irelands: 3
- NFL: 1

John Bosco McDermott (born 1936 in Dunmore, County Galway) is an Irish former sportsperson. He played Gaelic football with his local clubs Dunmore and Williamstown and was a member of the Galway senior inter-county team in the 1950s and 1960s. McDermott later served as manager of the Galway team between 1993 and 1996.

Sporting positions
Preceded by John Tobin	Galway Senior Football Manager; 1993-1996	Succeeded by Val Daly
