= 1964–65 National Football League (Ireland) =

Gaelic football competition

League details
- Dates: October 1964 – 4 July 1965

League champions
- Winners: Galway (3rd win)
- Captain: John Donnellan

League runners-up
- Runners-up: New York
- Captain: Kenny Finn

The 1964–65 National Football League was the 34th staging of the National Football League (NFL), an annual Gaelic football tournament for the Gaelic Athletic Association county teams of Ireland.

Galway won the home competition with a win over Kerry in the final. The play-off with New York was now two-legged: the hosts won the first game with a last-minute point, but on Independence Day Galway won in a rout.

== Group Stages ==
=== Division I ===
==== Inter-group play-offs ====
4 April 1965 Final	Donegal	2-9 — 1-7	Derry

=== Division II ===
Team	Pld	W	D	L	Pts	Status
Meath	6	6	0	0	12	Qualified for knockout stage
Mayo	6	5	0	1	10
Cavan	6	4	0	2	8
Sligo	6	3	0	3	6
Westmeath	5	1	0	4	2
Longford	6	1	0	5	2
Leitrim	5	0	0	5	0

=== Division III ===
Team	Pld	W	D	L	Pts	Status
Galway	6	6	0	0	12	Qualified for knockout stage
Dublin	6	5	0	1	10
Louth	6	4	0	2	8
Offaly	6	3	0	3	6
Roscommon	6	2	0	4	2
Wicklow	6	1	0	5	2
Laois	6	0	0	5	0

== Knockout stages ==
=== Semi-finals ===
11 April 1965

Kerry	3-10 – 1-8	Donegal
M. O'Dwyer (1-0); D. Geaney (1-0); J. J. Barrett (1-0); B. O'Callaghan (0-5); V. Lucey (0-3); S. Burrows (0-1); P. Griffin (0-1)		J. Hannigan (1-0); M. McLoone (0-3); P. J. Flood (0-2); A. McDevitt (0-2); F. Campbell (0-1)

Referee: Mick Loftus (Mayo)
25 April 1965

Galway	0-8 – 1-2	Meath

Croke Park, Dublin
Attendance: 42,135
Referee: J Hatton (Wicklow)

=== Finals ===
16 May 1965
Home Final

Galway	1-7 – 0-8	Kerry

Croke Park, Dublin
Attendance: 47,191
Referee: Mick Loftus (Mayo)

27 June 1965
Final, first leg

New York	0-8 – 1-4	Galway

Gaelic Park, New York City
Referee: Liam Maguire (Cavan)

4 July 1965
Final, second leg

New York	0-9 – 3-8	Galway

Gaelic Park, New York City
Attendance: 12,215
Referee: Liam Maguire (Cavan)

Galway win 24–17 on aggregate.
