= John Dunne (Gaelic footballer) =

Gaelic footballer, coach, referee and administrator

Personal information
- Native name: Seán Ó Doinn (Irish)
- Nickname: Tull
- Born: 26 December 1911 Ballinasloe, County Galway, Ireland
- Died: 12 May 1990 (aged 78) Ballinasloe, County Galway, Ireland
- Occupation: Post office official

Sport
- Sport: Gaelic football
- Position: Midfield
Club
- Years: Club
- St Grellan's
Club titles
- Galway titles: 4
Inter-county
- Years: County
- 1932–1941: Galway
Inter-county titles
- Connacht titles: 5
- All-Irelands: 2
- NFL: 1

John "Tull" Dunne (26 December 1911 – 12 May 1990) was an Irish Gaelic football coach, player, referee and Gaelic games administrator. His football championship career at senior level with the Galway county team lasted ten seasons from 1932 until 1941.

Born in Brackernagh, Ballinasloe, County Galway, Dunne was the second child and eldest son born to William and Katie Dunne (née Donelan). The son of a carpenter, he was educated locally before finding employment in the local post office.

Dunne first played competitive Gaelic football with the St Grellan's club. He first played for the senior team at the age of seventeen, winning a county senior championship medal in his debut season in 1929. Dunne won three more county senior championship medals.

Dunne made his debut on the inter-county scene at the age of eighteen when he was selected for the Galway junior team. He enjoyed one championship season with the junior team, culminating with the winning of an All-Ireland medal. He subsequently joined the Galway senior team and made his debut during the 1932 championship. Over the course of the next decade Dunne won All-Ireland medals in 1934 and as captain of the team in 1938. He also won five Connacht medals and one National Football League medal.

After being selected for the Connacht inter-provincial team for the first time in 1934, Dunne was a regular choice on the starting fifteen for the rest of the decade. During that time he won three Railway Cup medals.

Even as a player, Dunne became heavily involved in the administration of the game. He was appointed secretary of the Galway Football Board in 1938, a position he held until 1981. He also served on the Connacht Council and was Galway's Central Council delegate from 1971 until 1988. Dunne also refereed the 1945 All-Ireland Senior Football Championship Final between Cork and Cavan.

Dunne also had a three-decades-long tenure as coach to the Galway minor, under-21, junior and senior teams. During that time he guided the Galway minors to All-Ireland MFC titles in 1952, 1960, and 1970 and the juniors to All-Ireland success in 1958. As coach and selector with the Galway seniors, Dunne guided the team to All-Ireland SFC victories in 1956 and, most notably, the three-in-a-row winning side of 1964–1966, of which his son Cyril was a member. He was still on the sideline when Galway lost three All-Ireland SFCs in four years in the early 1970s.

Sporting positions
Preceded by	Galway Senior Football Captain; 1938	Succeeded by
Preceded by	Galway Senior Football Captain; 1940	Succeeded by Dinny O'Sullivan
Achievements
Preceded by Miko Doyle	All-Ireland SFC winning captain 1938	Succeeded by Tom O'Connor
Preceded by Paddy Mythen	All-Ireland SFC Final referee 1945	Succeeded by Bill Delaney
Awards
Preceded by Jim McCullough	GAA All-Time All Star Award; 1984	Succeeded by John Joe Landers; Tim Landers
