= 1959 All-Ireland Minor Football Championship =

Gaelic football competition

Championship details

All-Ireland Champions
- Winning team: Dublin (7th win)

All-Ireland Finalists
- Losing team: Cavan

Provincial Champions
- Munster: Cork
- Leinster: Dublin
- Ulster: Cavan
- Connacht: Galway

The 1959 All-Ireland Minor Football Championship was the 28th staging of the All-Ireland Minor Football Championship, the Gaelic Athletic Association's premier inter-county Gaelic football tournament for boys under the age of 18.

Dublin entered the championship as defending champions.

On 27 September 1959, Dublin won the championship following an 0-11 to 1-4 defeat of Cavan in the All-Ireland final. This was their seventh All-Ireland title overall and their second in succession. It was also a fifth All-Ireland title in six championship seasons for Dublin.

== Results ==
=== Connacht Minor Football Championship ===
Mayo 4-15 Sligo 1-5 Quarter Final Mayo 3-9 Leitrim 4-4 Semi Final Galway 2-5 Roscommon 1-4 Galway 3-9- Mayo 1-8 Final

=== All-Ireland Minor Football Championship ===
Semi-Finals

Cavan 2-3 Galway 0-8

Final

27 September 1959 Final	Dublin	0-11 - 1-04	Cavan	Croke Park, Dublin
