= Inter-county =

Term used in Gaelic games

Inter-county is Gaelic Athletic Association (GAA) terminology which refers to competitions or matches between counties, as used in Gaelic games (differently from legal counties). The term can also be used to describe the players on the teams.

The first inter-county competitions the All-Ireland Senior Football Championship and the All-Ireland Senior Hurling Championship took place in 1887. County teams select the best players from the clubs within the county, a practice which began in 1892. Before 1892 the winner of each county's club championship would represent the county in the All-Ireland championships.

The inter-county season begins in January with each province's warm-up competition and ends in September with the All-Ireland final. The GAA's inter county competitions are the organisation's most attended competitions and are Ireland's most attended sporting events, while the All-Ireland finals are the most watched. and the All-Ireland Football Final is the most watched event in Ireland's sporting calendar.

Usually each of the 32 GAA counties in Ireland participates in the inter-county leagues and in the All-Ireland Senior Hurling Championship; Kilkenny does not compete in the All-Ireland Senior Football Championship, and Cavan does not currently compete in the National Hurling League, though Fingal (part of Dublin) recently did. London also competes in the hurling and Gaelic football championships and leagues, winning the All-Ireland Senior Hurling Championship once in 1901, Warwickshire competes in the hurling championship only, while New York competes in the Men's Football Championship; in the past they also competed in the Hurling Championship.

The British Provincial Council organises inter-county competitions for the seven counties under its control on the island of Britain. The British Provincial Council is the only area outside Ireland to organise regular inter-county matches.

Changing clubs between counties is known as an inter-county transfer and is regulated by the Provincial council if the clubs are in the same province, or by the central council of the GAA when the transferring between clubs in different provinces. A special transfer is available for students going on a J-1 visa, which allows a temporary transfer to Canada, New York or North America.
