= Connacht Minor Football Championship =

Gaelic football competition

The Connacht Minor Football Championship is an annual Gaelic football competition organised by the Connacht Council of the Gaelic Athletic Association since 1928 for the youngest competitors (under-18 until 2017, now under-17) in the province of Connacht in Ireland. It is currently sponsored by Electric Ireland and therefore officially known as the Electric Ireland Connacht GAA Football Minor Championship.

The series of games are played during the summer months with the Connacht final currently being played in July. The minor final provides the curtain-raiser to the senior final.

The Connacht Championship is an integral part of the wider All-Ireland Minor Football Championship. The winners of the Connacht final, like their counterparts in the other provincial championships, are rewarded by advancing to the quarter-final stage of the All-Ireland series of games. The losers of the Connacht final also enter the All-Ireland series at the quarter-final stage.

== Top winners ==
	Team	Wins	Years won	Runners up	Years runners up
1	Mayo	43	1930, 1931, 1933, 1934, 1935, 1936, 1940, 1946, 1947, 1950, 1953, 1954, 1955, 1957, 1958, 1961, 1962, 1963, 1964, 1966, 1971, 1973, 1974, 1977, 1978, 1979, 1980, 1985, 1991, 1996, 1997, 1999, 2000, 2001, 2008, 2009, 2010, 2013, 2014, 2019, 2022,2023, 2024.	22	1932, 1937, 1939, 1959, 1965, 1967, 1969, 1970, 1981, 1984, 1986, 1987, 1988, 1992, 1993, 1994, 1995, 2003, 2006, 2012, 2016, 2025,
2	Galway	29	1932, 1937, 1938, 1948, 1952, 1959, 1960, 1969, 1970, 1972, 1976, 1982, 1983, 1986, 1987, 1988, 1990, 1993, 1994, 1995, 2002, 2003, 2004, 2005, 2007, 2015, 2016, 2017, 2018	22	1934, 1941, 1946, 1951, 1955, 1962, 1964, 1968, 1973, 1975, 1978, 1979, 1985, 1989, 1999, 2001, 2005, 2010, 2011, 2019, 2022, 2023,
3	Roscommon	16	1939, 1941, 1951, 1965, 1967, 1975, 1981, 1984, 1989, 1992, 2006, 2011, 2012, 2020, 2025,2026	26	1931, 1933, 1949, 1950, 1953, 1956, 1958, 1960, 1963, 1966, 1971, 1972, 1974, 1980, 1983, 1990, 1997, 2000, 2004, 2007, 2008, 2009, 2013, 2014, 2018, 2021,2024.
4	Leitrim	3	1945, 1956, 1998	8	1938, 1940, 1948, 1957, 1977, 1982, 1991, 2002
4	Sligo	3	1949, 1968, 2021	14	1930, 1935, 1936, 1945, 1947, 1952, 1954, 1961, 1976, 1996, 1998, 2015, 2017, 2020

== List of finals ==
All-Ireland champions
All-Ireland runners-up

Year	Winner	Score	Runners-up	Score
2026	Roscommon	3-12	Galway	1-17
2025	Roscommon	2-14	Mayo	1-15
2024	Mayo	0-14	Roscommon	0-10
2023	Mayo	2-13	Galway	1-10
2022	Mayo	0-13	Galway	0-7
2021	Sligo	0-19	Roscommon	0-11
2020	Roscommon	1-05	Sligo	1-02
2019	Mayo	1-18	Galway	1-17
2018	Galway	2–13	Roscommon	2-09
2017	Galway	3–11	Sligo	0–10
2016	Galway	1–09 (12)	Mayo	0–06 (6)
2015	Galway	0–07 (7) 4–12 (24)	Sligo	1–04 (7) 1–08 (11)
2014	Mayo	2–16	Roscommon	0–14
2013	Mayo	3–07	Roscommon	1–10
2012	Roscommon	0–10	Mayo	0–08
2011	Roscommon	1–09	Galway	0–06
2010	Mayo	3–09	Galway	1–10
2009	Mayo	1–05, 1–08 (R)	Roscommon	0–08, 0–05 (R)
2008	Mayo	0–10	Roscommon	0–07
2007	Galway	2–07	Roscommon	0–09
2006	Roscommon	0–12	Mayo	0–09
2005	Mayo	0–09	Galway	0–10
2004	Galway	3–10	Roscommon	2–10
2003	Galway	1–09	Mayo	0–09
2002	Galway	1–12	Leitrim	0–06
2001	Mayo	0–15	Galway	0–11
2000	Mayo	1–12	Roscommon	1–08
1999	Mayo	3–03	Galway	1–06
1998	Leitrim	0–08	Sligo	0–07
1997	Mayo	0–13	Roscommon	0–09
1996	Mayo	0–10, 2–03 (R)	Sligo	0–10, 0–08 (R)
1995	Galway	2–14	Mayo	2–11
1994	Galway	2–11	Mayo	0–09
1993	Galway	0–11 3–08 (R)	Mayo	1–08 1–10 (R)
1992	Roscommon	0–10	Mayo	0–09
1991	Mayo	4–09	Leitrim	0–06
1990	Galway	1–18	Roscommon	2–03
1989	Roscommon	0–13, 2–11 (R)	Galway	2-08, 0–15 (R)
1988	Galway	2–09	Mayo	3–04
1987	Galway	2–08	Mayo	2–04
1986	Galway	1–09	Mayo	2–01
1985	Mayo	0–06	Galway	1–01
1984	Roscommon	1–11, 3–09 (R)	Mayo	2–08, 2–08 (R)
1983	Galway	2–10	Roscommon	2–05
1982	Galway	1–07	Leitrim	0–07
1981	Roscommon	2–08	Mayo	3–04
1980	Mayo	3–08	Roscommon	2–09
1979	Mayo	5–11	Galway	3–07
1978	Mayo	2–06	Galway	0–04
1977	Mayo	2–20	Leitrim	0–07
1976	Galway	6–16	Sligo	3–03
1975	Roscommon	1–15	Galway	0–05
1974	Mayo	4–12	Roscommon	2–03
1973	Mayo	3–07	Galway	0–03
1972	Galway	4–11	Roscommon	1–11
1971	Mayo	2–12	Roscommon	1–08
1970	Galway	2–11	Mayo	1–06
1969	Galway	3–03	Mayo	0–08
1968	Sligo	1–08	Galway	0–07
1967	Roscommon	2–05	Mayo	1–05
1966	Mayo	1–09	Roscommon	0–07
1965	Roscommon	2–10	Mayo	1–10
1964	Mayo	2–07	Galway	1–03
1963	Mayo	3–05	Roscommon	1–05
1962	Mayo	7–08	Galway	0–10
1961	Mayo	5–08	Sligo	0–05
1960	Galway	4–11	Roscommon	0–03
1959	Galway	3–09	Mayo	1–08
1958	Mayo	1–08	Roscommon	1–04
1957	Mayo	4–04	Leitrim	2–05
1956	Leitrim	2–07	Roscommon	1–06
1955	Mayo	2–05	Galway	1–05
1954	Mayo	9–16	Sligo	0–04
1953	Mayo	1–09	Roscommon	1–03
1952	Galway	4–11	Sligo	0–03
1951	Roscommon	2–04	Galway	1–08
1950	Mayo	3–07	Roscommon	1–04
1949	Sligo	1–07, 2–07 (R)	Roscommon	2–04, 3–10 (R)
1948	Galway	3–04	Leitrim	0–05
1947	Mayo	3–06	Sligo	2–05
1946	Mayo	4–09	Galway	1–05
1945	Leitrim	1–05, 2–06 (R)	Sligo	2–02, 1–05 (R)
1944	No competition			
1943	No competition			
1942	No competition			
1941	Roscommon	2–06	Galway	0–06
1940	Mayo	8–05	Leitrim	1–06
1939	Roscommon	1–10	Mayo	1–03
1938	Galway	6–05	Leitrim	1–06
1937	Galway	2–08	Mayo	1–03
1936	Mayo	4–09	Sligo	1–08
1935	Mayo	2–02	Sligo	1–03
1934	Mayo	2–13	Galway	0–05
1933	Mayo	5–07	Roscommon	0–06
1932	Galway	3–05	Mayo	1–04
1931	Mayo	2–10	Roscommon	3–02
1930	Mayo	3–04	Sligo	1–01

- 1989 Provincial council decides to replay: disputed penalty goal
- 1951 Roscommon awarded title on objection
- 1949 Sligo awarded title on objection

== Sources ==
- Roll of Honour on www.gaainfo.com
- Complete Roll of Honour on Kilkenny GAA bible
