= 1965 All-Ireland Senior Football Championship =

Football championship

Championship details
- Dates: May 2 – September 26, 1965
- Teams: 31

All-Ireland Champions
- Winning team: Galway (6th win)
- Captain: Enda Colleran
- Manager: John "Tull" Dunne. (St Grellan's, Ballinasloe)

All-Ireland Finalists
- Losing team: Kerry
- Captain: Jer D. O'Connor
- Manager: Jim Brosnan

Provincial Champions
- Munster: Kerry
- Leinster: Dublin
- Ulster: Down
- Connacht: Galway

Championship statistics
- No. matches played: 30
- Player of the Year: Martin L. Newell (Galway)

The 1965 All-Ireland Senior Football Championship was the 79th staging of the All-Ireland Senior Football Championship, the Gaelic Athletic Association's premier inter-county Gaelic football tournament. The championship began on 2 May 1965 and ended on 26 September 1965.

Limerick rejoin the Munster football championship for the first time since 1952.

The decider was a repeat of the 1964 All-Ireland Senior Football Championship Final, between Galway and Kerry. There was no change in the outcome as Galway defeated Kerry again by 0–12 to 0–09. It was Galway’s second title in succession, on their way to "Three In A Row".

== Provincial Championships format changes ==
=== Connacht Championship format change ===
The Connacht championship, instead of the normal system, has two quarter-finals and one semi-final instead of the usual one quarter-final and two semi-finals for just one year. All-Ireland champions Galway received a bye to the Connacht final meaning that Mayo, Roscommon, Sligo and Leitrim would be in separate quarter-finals. The winners of the two games would play in a lone semi-final while the semi-final winner would play Galway.

The only year in between (1933–1940) & 2020 that it happened.

=== Leinster Championship format change ===
The Leinster championship dropped the second round after one year in 1965. The preliminary round winners went on to the quarter-finals.

== Results ==
=== Connacht Senior Football Championship ===
Quarter-finals

6 June 1965 Quarter-final	Mayo	2–15 – 1–6	Roscommon	St. Coman's Park, Roscommon
	D Doris (0–2), J Farragher (1–0), M Connaughton (0–1); J Langan (0–4), M Ruane (0–4), P Sheridan (0–2), J Corcoran (0–1).

27 June 1965 Quarter-final	Sligo	4–12 – 0–6	Leitrim	Páirc Seán Mac Diarmada, Carrick-on-Shannon

Semi-final

4 July 1965 Semi-final	Sligo	2–11 – 2–8	Mayo	Fr. O'Hara Park, Charlestown
			D Doris (0–1), J Mannion, M Connaughton (0–2); J Langan (1–3), M Ruane (0–1), P Kilbane (1–0), J Corcoran (0–1).

Final

1 August 1965 Final	Galway	1–12 – 2–6	Sligo	Tuam Stadium, Tuam
	C Dunne 0–5, C Tyrrell 1–1, M McDonagh 0–3, S Cleary 0–1, P Donnellan 0–1, J Donnellan 0–1.		D McHugh 1–1, M Durcan 1–1, M Kearns 0–3, B Shannon 0–1.	Attendance: 30,000

=== Leinster Senior Football Championship ===
Preliminary round

2 May 1965 Preliminary round	Kildare	3–14 – 1–4	Wicklow	Dr. Cullen Park, Carlow
	P.Dunny, J.McKenna 1–3, N.Madigan 1–2, J.Donoghue 0–2, M.Coughlan, J.Loughlin, P.Mangan, B.Judge 0–1.

2 May 1965 Preliminary round	Offaly	0–5 – 1–5	Longford	Cusack Park, Mullingar
				Referee: P Hughes (Louth)

9 May 1965 Preliminary round	Westmeath	2–11 – 0–9	Louth	Páirc Tailteann, Navan

Quarter-finals

23 May 1965 Quarter-final	Kildare	4–10 – 2–9	Carlow	Dr. Cullen Park, Carlow
	P.Dunny 1–3, N.Madigan, J.Loughlin 1–2, S.Donoghue 0–2, J.McKenna 0–1

30 May 1965 Quarter-final	Dublin	2–11 – 1–7	Wexford	Dr. Cullen Park, Carlow
	J Keaveney 1–3, M Whelan 0–4, T Donnelly 1–0, B McDonald 0–2 (0-1f), G Davey and D Mulligan 0–1 each		W Foley 0–4 (0-3f), S Sheridan 0–2, P Wilson 0–1

6 June 1965 Quarter-final	Longford	1–9 – 0–8	Laois	Cusack Park, Mullingar

13 June 1965 Quarter-final	Meath	1–12 – 1–9	Westmeath	Croke Park, Dublin

Semi-finals

20 June 1965 Semi-final	Dublin	1–11 – 0–5	Kildare	O'Connor Park, Tullamore
	J Timmons 0–7 (0-1f), Donal Mulligan 1–0, C Leaney 0–2, N Fox and B McDonald 0–1 each		J McKenna, P Dunny, B Judge, N Madigan, K Kelly (0-1f) 0–1 each	Attendance: 18,004

4 July 1965 Semi-final	Longford	2–8 – 1–7	Meath	Croke Park, Dublin

Final

25 July 1965 Final	Dublin	3–6 – 0–9	Longford	Croke Park, Dublin
	Jimmy Keaveney 1–1, Des Foley and Brian McDonald 1–0 each John Timmons (0-1f) and Gerry Davey 0–1 each		Sean Murray 0-4f, Jimmy Hannify 0–2, Jackie Devine, Mick Hopkins, Sean Donnelly 0–1 each	Attendance: 30,120; Referee: Paddy Hughes (Louth)

=== Munster Senior Football Championship ===
Quarter-finals

2 May 1965 Quarter-final	Tipperary	0–4 – 2–7	Clare	Gaelic Grounds, Limerick
	M Keating 0–2, B Keating 0–2.		M Begley 1–1, T Mangain 1–0, P O'Mahony 0–3, T Murphy 0–2, G Cleary 0–1.	Referee: S. Garvey (Kerry)

16 May 1965 Quarter-final	Limerick	4–10 – 0–6	Waterford	Seán Treacy Park, Tipperary
	P Murphy 2–1, P Reidy 1–3, E Cregan 1–1, D Quirke 0–2, J Ahern 0–1, M Tynan 0–1, T Carrig 0–1.		T Kirwan 0–3, J Martin 0–3.

Semi-finals

13 June 1965 Semi-final	Kerry	2–10 – 1–6	Clare	Gaelic Grounds, Limerick
	B O'Callaghan 1–3, M O'Dwyer 0–4, V Lucey 1–0, M Fleming 0–1, M O'Connell 0–1, D Geaney 0–1.		J Cleary 1–0, P McMahon 0–3, T Mangain 0–1, T Mee 0–1, P Tubridy 0–1.

20 June 1965 Semi-final	Limerick	2–5 – 0–6	Cork	Fitzgerald Stadium, Killarney
	E Cregan 1–2, M Tynan 1–0, T Meaney 0–1, P Reidy 0–1, J Mullane 0–1.		D Harnedy 0–4, P O'Sullivan 0–1, J Carroll 0–1.

Final

18 July 1965 Final	Kerry	2–16 – 2–7	Limerick	Gaelic Grounds, Limerick
	V Lucey 0–6, JJ Barrett 1–2, M O'Connell 0–5, B O'Callaghan 1–1, M Fleming 0–1, M O'Dwyer 0–1.		P Murphy 1–2, E Cregan 0–5, M Tynan 1–0.

=== Ulster Senior Football Championship ===
Preliminary round

30 May 1965 Preliminary round	Antrim	2–9 – 2–6	Derry	Dean McGlinchey Park, Ballinascreen

Quarter-finals

6 June 1965 Quarter-final	Monaghan	2–12 – 1–5	Fermanagh	St. Molise Park, Irvinestown

13 June 1965 Quarter-final	Down	3–13 – 1–6	Tyrone	Pairc Esler, Newry

20 June 1965 Quarter-final	Armagh	3–7 – 1–9	Monaghan	The Playing Fields, Lurgan

20 June 1965 Quarter-final	Cavan	1–8 – 1–8	Donegal	MacCumhaill Park, Ballybofey

4 July 1965 Quarter-final, first replay	Cavan	0–14 – 2–8 (aet)	Donegal	Breffni Park, Cavan

11 July 1965 Quarter-final, second replay	Cavan	0–9 – 0–8	Donegal	Breffni Park, Cavan

Semi-finals

7 July 1965 Semi-final	Down	0–10 – 1–4	Antrim	Pairc Esler, Newry

14 July 1965 Semi-final	Cavan	1–10 – 0–4	Armagh	St. Tiernach's Park, Clones

Final

1 August 1965 Final	Down	1–10 – 1–8	Cavan	St. Tiernach's Park, Clones

=== All-Ireland Senior Football Championship ===
Semi-finals

8 August 1965 Semi-final	Kerry	4–8 – 2–6	Dublin	Croke Park, Dublin
	D. O'Sullivan 0–1, M. O'Connell 0–1, Denis O'Sullivan 0–1, D. O'Shea 1–1, J.J. Barrett 0–1, B. O'Callaghan 1–3, M. O'Dwyer 2–0.

22 August 1965 Semi-final	Galway	0–10 – 0–7	Down	Croke Park, Dublin
	C Dunne 0–6, S Keenan 0–2, M McDonagh 0–1, S Cleary 0–1.		S O'Neill 0–3, B Johnston 0–2, P Doherty 0–1, G Glynn 0–1.

Final

26 September 1965 Final	Galway	0–12 – 0–9	Kerry	Croke Park, Dublin
	C Dunne 0–4, S Leydon 0–3, J Keenan 0–2, J Donnellan 0–2, M Garrett 0–1.		B O'Callaghan 0–6, M O'Connell 0–2, M O'Dwyer 0–1.	Attendance: 77,735; Referee: M Loftus (Mayo)

== Championship statistics ==
=== Miscellaneous ===
- On 16 May 1965, Seán Treacy Park, Tipperary hosted its first match for 23 years the Munster quarter-final meeting between Limerick and Waterford, their first meeting in 31 years as Limerick returned to the Munster football championship for the first time since 1952 after recording wins over Waterford and Cork but lost the Munster final to Kerry who made an historic 8th Munster title in a row.
- Longford reach their first Leinster final but are beaten by Dublin.
- Galway win the All Ireland title twice in a row and another three Connacht titles in a row.

=== Top scorers ===
Overall

Rank	Player	County	Tally	Total	Matches	Average
1	Martin L. Newell	Galway	?	?	3	?

Single game

Rank	Player	County	Tally	Total	Opposition
1					
