= 1963 All-Ireland Senior Football Championship =

Football championship

Championship details
- Dates: 5 May – 22 September 1963
- Teams: 31

All-Ireland Champions
- Winning team: Dublin (17th win)
- Captain: Des Foley

All-Ireland Finalists
- Losing team: Galway
- Captain: Mick Garrett
- Manager: John "Tull" Dunne

Provincial Champions
- Munster: Kerry
- Leinster: Dublin
- Ulster: Down
- Connacht: Galway

Championship statistics
- No. matches played: 30
- Top Scorer: Mickey Whelan (1–20)
- Player of the Year: Lar Foley

The 1963 All-Ireland Senior Football Championship was the 77th staging of the All-Ireland Senior Football Championship, the Gaelic Athletic Association's premier inter-county Gaelic football tournament. The championship began on 5 May 1963 and ended on 22 September 1963. As of 2018, it remains the last All Ireland Senior Football Championship season to be completed without any draws.

Kilkenny dropped from the championship until 1975.

Kerry entered the championship as the defending champions, however, they were defeated by Galway in the All-Ireland semi-final.

On 22 September 1963, Dublin won the championship following a 1–9 to 0–10 defeat of Galway in the All-Ireland final. Their first All-Ireland victory in five championship seasons, this was their 17th All-Ireland triumph.

Dublin's Mickey Whelan was the championship's top scorer with 1–20. His teammate Lar Foley was the choice for Texaco Footballer of the Year.

== Results ==
=== Connacht Senior Football Championship ===
Quarter-final

9 June 1963 Quarter-final	Sligo	1–9 – 1–10	Leitrim	Markievicz Park, Sligo
	D McHugh 1–3, M Kearns 0–3, B Shannon 0–2, J Hannon 0–1.		C Flynn 0–7, K McGowan 1–0, P McGarty 0–2, P Guckian 0–1.	Attendance: 4,000; Referee: P O'Connor (Roscommon)

Semi-finals

16 June 1963 Semi-final	Mayo	1–6 – 2–8	Galway	MacHale Park, Castlebar
	J Corcoran 0–4, PJ Loftus 1–0, J Langan 0–1, D Doris 0–1.		S Concannon 1–1, P Donnellan 1–0, C Dunne 0–3, S Letdon 0–2, M McDonagh 0–1, S CLeary 0–1.	Attendance: 12,000; Referee: R Lang (Sligo)

23 June 1963 Semi-final	Leitrim	1–8 – 1–3	Roscommon	Markievicz Park, Sligo
	C Flynn 1–6, J Murray 0–1, Mel Kelly 0–1.		D Feely 1–1, A White 0–2.	Attendance: 7,000; Referee: M Loftus (Mayo)

Final

14 July 1963 Final	Galway	4–11 – 1–6	Leitrim	MacHale Park, Castlebar
	S Leydon 3–1, P Donnellan 1–3, M McDonagh 0–4, S Concannon 0–1, M Reynolds 0–1, S Cleary 0–1.		D Gannon 1–1, C Flynn 0–5.	Attendance: 20,000; Referee: M Loftus (Mayo)

=== Leinster Senior Football Championship ===
First round

5 May 1963 First round	Carlow	4–10 – 1–4	Kilkenny	Dr. Cullen Park, Carlow

5 May 1963 First round	Westmeath	1–6 – 3–8	Longford	Cusack Park, Mullingar
	D Nolan 1–0, G Kane 0–3, J Bradley 0–2, O Costelloe 0–1.		S Murray 0–6, N Dodd 1–0, D O'Brien 1–0, R carter 1–0, A Tynan 0–2.

19 May 1963 First round	Meath	1–10 – 1–3	Wexford	Croke Park, Dublin
	P McCormack 0–5, M Dunican 1–0, D Carty 0–2, J Quinn 0–2, G Cromwell 0–1.		P Crowley 1–0, M O'Neill 0–2, M Byrne 0–1.	Referee: J Shannon (Dublin)

26 May 1963 First round	Louth	2–15 – 1–6	Wicklow	Croke Park, Dublin
	J Mulroy 1–6, M McKeown 1–3, L Leech 0–2, J Woods 0–1, S Thornton 0–1, K Behan 0–1, S Burgess 0–1.		T McGee 1–0, P Clarke 0–4, D Byrne 0–1, W Cuffe 0–1.

Quarter-finals

19 May 1963 Quarter-final	Offaly	2–5 – 1–2	Longford	Cusack Park, Mullingar
	T Greene 1–1, L Boland 1–0, H Donnelly 0–3, S Ryan 0–1.		D O'Brien 1–0, M Hopkins 0–2.	Attendance: J Hatton (Wicklow); Referee: 12,428

26 May 1963 Quarter-final	Laois	3–9 – 0–10	Carlow	Geraldine Park, Athy
	N Delaney 1–3, N Dunne 1–1, S Price 1–0, Fint Walsh 0–2, G Rankins 0–2, T Browne 0–1.		B Hayden 0–8, E Hogan 0–1, M Donovan 0–1.

2 June 1963 Quarter-final	Dublin	2–6 – 2–5	Meath	Croke Park, Dublin
	J Timmons 1–3, M Whelan 1–0, L Foley 0–2, D Foley 0–1.		J Nallen 1–1, J Quinn 1–1, P McCormack 0–2, J Cromwell 0–1.	Attendance: 21,931; Referee: E Moules (Wicklow)

9 June 1963 Quarter-final	Kildare	2–11 – 1–12	Louth	Croke Park, Dublin
	H Fahy 1–5, J McNally 1–1, J Andreson 0–3, N Madigan 0–1, P Moore 0–1.		L Leech 1–2, M Gartlan 0–3, K Behan 0–2, J Mulroy 0–2, M McKeown 0–1, F Clarke 0–1, F Lynch 0–1.	Referee: B Smyth (Meath)

Semi-finals

23 June 1963 Semi-final	Dublin	2–7 – 1–5	Kildare	Croke Park, Dublin
	D Ferguson 1–2, B McDonald 1–0, M Whelan 0–3, J Timmons 0–1, S Behan 0–1.		H Fay 1–2, M Carolan 0–1, M Geraghty 0–1, P Moore 0–1.	Attendance: 38,470

30 June 1963 Semi-final	Laois	2–7 – 0–9	Offaly	O'Moore Park, Portlaoise
	S Price 1–1, D Byrne 0–4, G Rankins 1–0, D Delaney 0–1, N Delaney 0–1.		H Donnelly 0–6, M Brady 0–1, T Furlong 0–1, D Hanlon 0–1.	Attendance: 22,000; Referee: P Kelly (Dublin)

Final

14 July 1963 Final	Dublin	2–11 – 2–9	Laois	Croke Park, Dublin
	Mickey Whelan 0–6 (0-3f), Gerry Davey and Brian McDonald 1–1 each, Lar Foley 0–2 (0-1f, 1 '50), Eamon Breslin 0–1		Noel Delaney 2–1, Dinny Byrne 0-4f, Tom Browne (1 '50), Fintan Walsh, Danny Delaney, Sean Price 0–1 each	Attendance: 50,042; Referee: Brian Smyth (Meath)

=== Munster Senior Football Championship ===
Quarter-final

2 June 1963 Quarter-final	Tipperary	1–12 – 0–6	Clare	Gaelic Grounds, Limerick
				Referee: J Sheehan (Dublin)

Semi-finals

9 June 1963 Semi-final	Cork	2–14 – 2–1	Waterford	Páirc Mac Gearailt, Fermoy
	E Coughlan 1–2, E Ryan 1–1, C O'Sullivan 0–4, JJ Murphy 0–4, N O'Halloran 0–2, C O'Sullivan 0–1.		T Kirwan 1–0, P Walsh 1–0, P Murray 0–1.

23 June 1963 Semi-final	Kerry	5–10 – 1–6	Tipperary	Frank Sheehy Park, Listowel
	B O'Callaghan 2–3, V Lucey 1–2, F O'Leary 1–1, S Sheehy 1–0, M O'Connell 0–4.		S McGovern 1–2, M Keating 0–1, J O'Meara 0–1, G Danagher 0–1, L Boland 0–1.	Referee: J Sheehan (Dublin)

Final

14 July 1963 Final	Kerry	1–18 – 3–7	Cork	Fitzgerald Stadium, Killarney
	Mick O'Dwyer 1–3, Mick O'Connell 0-4f, Bernie O'Callaghan (0-2f), Tom Long, Frank O'Leary 0–3 each, Pat Griffin 0–2		Willie O'Leary 2–3 (0-3f), JJ Murphy 1–0, Mick Burke 0–2, Paul O'Sullivan and Bernie Coughlan 0–1 each	Attendance: 22,847; Referee: J Martin (Roscommon)

=== Ulster Senior Football Championship ===
Preliminary round

2 June 1963 Preliminary round	Antrim	2–9 – 0–3	Tyrone	Casement Park, Belfast
	P Lynn 1–2, G McRory 0–4, S Rice 1–0, S Deveney 0–1, P McGuckian 0–1, L McNeill 0–1.		F Donnelly 0–3.	Attendance: 5,000

Quarter-finals

9 June 1963 Quarter-final	Down	6–11 – 1–3	Monaghan	Pairc Esler, Newry
	V Kane 2–2, D McCartan 1–2, S O'Neill 1–2, J Fitzsimons 1–1, B Johnstone 1–0, K O'Neill 0–1, J Lennon 0–1, A Hedden 0–1, E Lavery 0–1.		J McArdle 1–0, Paddy Duffy 0–2, B Curran 0–1.	Referee: V Mulholland (Armagh)

16 June 1963 Quarter-final	Armagh	1–8 – 2–3	Antrim	The Playing Fields, Lurgan
	J Whan 1–1, D McCrory 0–2, J Murphy 0–2, K Brown 0–2, E Casey 0–1.		L McNeill 2–0, G McCrory 0–2, P Lynn 0–1.	Referee: P Rooney (Down)

16 June 1963 Quarter-final	Donegal	2–12 – 1–6	Fermanagh	MacCumhaill Park, Ballybofey
	H Laverty 0–6, D Breslin 1–0, D Houlihan 1–0, S Ferriter 0–3, J Hannigan 0–2, P Ward 0–1.		J Maguire 0–4, PT Treacy 1–0, T Greene 0–1, H Murphy 0–1.

23 June 1963 Quarter-final	Derry	2–8 – 3–9	Cavan	Dean McGlinchey Park, Ballinascreen
	S O'Connell 1–3, D McKeever 1–0, HF Gribbin 0–2, L O'Neill 0–2, D Mullan 0–1.		C Gallagher 0–7, J Brady 1–2, C Toal 1–0, R Carolan 1–0.	Attendance: 6,000; Referee: J Martin (Tyrone)

Semi-finals

7 July 1963 Semi-final	Down	0–9 – 0–5	Armagh	Casement Park, Belfast
	S O'Neill 0–3, B Morgan 0–1, V Kane 0–1, B Johnstone 0–1, J McCartan 0–1, J Lennon 0–1, A Haddon 0–1.		K Browne 0–3, E Casey 0–1, J Murphy 0–1.	Attendance: 15,000

14 July 1963 Semi-final	Donegal	4–5 – 0–6	Cavan	St. Tiernach's Park, Clones
	H Laverty 2–3, D Houlihan 1–1, D Breslin 1–0, M Griffin 0–1.		J McDonnell 0–2, C Gallagher 0–1, R Carolan 0–1, T Lynch 0–1, P Pritchard 0–1.	Attendance: 20,000

Final

28 July 1963 Final	Down	2–11 – 1–4	Donegal	Breffni Park, Cavan
	B Johnstone 1–2, P Doherty 1–1, S O'Neill 0–4, V Kane 0–2, D McCartan 0–1, J McCartan 0–1.		J Hannigan 1–0, C Breslin 0–2, S Ferriter 0–1, F McFeeley 0–1.	Attendance: 35,000

=== All-Ireland Senior Football Championship ===
Semi-finals

4 August 1963 Semi-final	Galway	1–7 – 0–8	Kerry	Croke Park, Dublin
	P Donnellan 1–1, S Leydon 0–3, C Dunne 0–2, M McDonagh 0–1.		M O'Connell 0–4, F O'Leary 0–2, P Griffin 0–1, T Long 0–1.	Attendance: 37,193; Referee: E Moules (Wicklow)

18 August 1963 Semi-final	Dublin	2–11 – 0–7	Down	Croke Park, Dublin
	B McDonald 2–0, M Whelan 0–6, J Timmons 0–3, D Foley 0–1, D Ferguson 0–1.		S O'Neill 0–3, P Doherty 0–2, J McCartan 0–1, J Lennon 0–1.	Attendance: 70,072; Referee: C Crowley (Waterford)

Final

22 September 1963 Final	Dublin	1–9 – 0–10	Galway	Croke Park, Dublin
	M Whelan 0–5, G Davey 1–0, J Timmons 0–2, B McDonald 0–1, D Ferguson 0–1.		M McDonagh 0–5, J Keenan 0–2, C Dunne 0–2, S Leydon 0–1.	Attendance: 87,106; Referee: E Moules (Wicklow)

== Championship statistics ==
=== Scoring ===
Overall

Rank	Player	County	Tally	Total	Matches	Average
1	Mickey Whelan	Dublin	1–20	23	5	4.60
2	Cathal Flynn	Leitrim	1–18	21	3	7.00
3	Séamus Leydon	Galway	3–7	16	4	4.00
4	Harry Laverty	Donegal	2–9	15	3	5.00
4	Seán O'Neill	Down	1–12	15	4	3.75
6	Brian McDonald	Dublin	4–2	14	5	2.80
6	Noel Delaney	Laois	3–5	14	3	4.66
8	Pat Donnellan	Galway	3–4	13	4	3.25
8	Harry Fay	Kildare	2–7	13	2	6.50
10	John Timmons	Dublin	1–9	12	5	2.40
10	Mick O'Connell	Kerry	0–12	12	3	4.00

Single game

Rank	Player	County	Tally	Total	Opposition
1	Séamus Leydon	Galway	3–1	10	Leitrim
2	Bernie O'Callaghan	Kerry	2–3	9	Tipperary
2	Willie O'Leary	Cork	2–3	9	Kerry
2	Harry Laverty	Donegal	2–3	9	Cavan
2	Cathal Flynn	Leitrim	1–6	9	Roscommon
2	Jimmy Mulroy	Louth	1–6	9	Wicklow
7	Val Kane	Down	2–2	8	Monaghan
7	Harry Fay	Kildare	1–5	8	Louth
7	Brendan Hayden	Carlow	0–8	8	Laois
10	Noel Delaney	Laois	2–1	7	Dublin
10	Mick O'Dwyer	Kerry	1–4	7	Cork
10	Cathal Flynn	Leitrim	0–7	7	Sligo
10	Charlie Gallagher	Cavan	0–7	7	Derry

=== Miscellaneous ===
- Kilkenny dropped from the Leinster football championship until 1975 after a 1 sided defeat to Carlow.
- Cavan hosted the Ulster final for the first time since 1952.
- The All Ireland semi-final between Dublin and Down was their first championship meeting.
- The attendance of 87,106 at the All-Ireland final between Dublin and Galway was the third highest on record.
