= 1967 All-Ireland Senior Football Championship final =

- Event: 1967 All-Ireland Senior Football Championship
Meath	Cork
1–9 (12)	0–9 (9)
- Date: 24 September 1967
- Venue: Croke Park, Dublin
- Referee: John Moloney (Tipperary)
- Attendance: 70,343

The 1967 All-Ireland Senior Football Championship final was a Gaelic football match played at Croke Park on 24 September 1967 to determine the winner of the 1967 All-Ireland Senior Football Championship, the 81st season of the All-Ireland Senior Football Championship, a tournament organised by the Gaelic Athletic Association for the champions of the four provinces of Ireland. The final was contested by Cork of Munster and Meath of Leinster, with Meath winning by 1–9 to 0–9.

== Match ==
=== Summary ===
The All-Ireland SFC final between Cork and Meath was a unique occasion, as it was the first-ever championship meeting between the two teams. Cork were appearing in their first final in over a decade, while Meath were lining out in their second successive All-Ireland SFC decider.

The first half was a dour, tense affair riddled with mistakes. Cork surged ahead into a three-point lead, while Meath only registered one point in the first half after being held scoreless for 27 minutes.

In the second half, Meath were a transformed team. In his column in The Irish Times, Paddy Downey wrote: "Their second half transformation was so unexpected that it seems incredible. Nevertheless, it was a rally which for grit and guts and spirit surpassed anything I have seen in a final." Six minutes after the restart, Terry Kearns slipped unnoticed behind the Cork backline to punch Matt Kerrigan's centre to the net from 5 yards out. Inexperience cost Cork. Their last-minute goal chance was pulled back because Con O'Sullivan's short free to Flor Hayes was deemed too short by the referee.

Meath's All-Ireland SFC victory was their first since 1954. The win gave them their third title over all and put them joint eighth on the all-time roll of honour, along with Mayo, Louth and Cork.

Peter McDermott of Meath, also known as "the man in the cap" and a winner of All-Ireland SFC medals with the team in 1949 and 1954, was coach of the 1967 winning team.

Cork's defeat was their third at this stage since their last All-Ireland SFC victory in 1945. They previously lost All-Ireland SFC finals in 1956 and 1957.

=== Details ===
24 September 1967
15:15 IST
Final

Meath	1-9 (12) – (9) 0-9	Cork
(HT: 0-04 – 0-01)
Gls: Terry Kearns; Pts: Terry Kearns (2), P Mulvanney (2), M Mellett (2), N Curran (2), T Brennan		Pts: C O'Sullivan (3), E Philpott (3), B O'Neill, F Hayes, M O'Loughlin

Croke Park, Dublin
Referee: John Moloney (Tipperary)
Attendance: 70,343

Meath	Cork

1	Seán McCormack
2	Mick White
3	Jack Quinn
4	Peter Darby (c)
5	Pat Collier
6	Bertie Cunningham
7	Patrick Reynolds
8	Peter Moore
9	Terry Kearns
10	Tony Brennan
11	Mattie Kerrigan
12	Mick Mellett
13	Paddy Mulvany
14	Noel Curran
15	Ollie Shanley
Substitutes:
16	Paddy Cromwell
17	Martin Quinn
18	Oliver Geraghty
19	Peter Black
20	Mick O'Brien
21	Austin Lyons
22	Dave Carty
23	Jimmy Walsh
24	Pat Rooney
25	Pat Bruton
26	Murty Sullivan
27	Gerry Quinn
Trainers: Peter McDermott
Fr. Patrick Tully

1	Billy Morgan
2	Brian Murphy
3	Jerry Lucey
4	John O'Mahony
5	Frank Cogan
6	Denis Coughlan (c)
7	Kevin Dillon
8	Mick Burke
9	Mick O'Loughlin
10	Eric Philpott
11	Gene McCarthy
12	Bernie O'Neill
13	Éamonn Ryan
14	Con O'Sullivan
15	Flor Hayes
Substitutes:
16	Jim Downing
17	J.J. Murphy
18	Johnny Carroll
19	John Crowley
20	Jerry O'Sullivan
21	Tom Bermingham
Trainer:
Donie O'Donovan

== Aftermath ==
Meath subsequently toured Australia for some early examples of international rules football. Meath played five Australian state sides and won them all, producing a combined score of 26-43 to 3-29.
