= 1966 All-Ireland Senior Football Championship final =

- Event: 1966 All-Ireland Senior Football Championship
Galway	Meath
1–10 (13)	0–7 (7)
- Date: 25 September 1966
- Venue: Croke Park, Dublin
- Referee: Jimmy Hatton (Wicklow)
- Attendance: 71,569

The 1966 All-Ireland Senior Football Championship final was the 79th All-Ireland Final and the deciding match of the 1966 All-Ireland Senior Football Championship, an inter-county Gaelic football tournament for the top teams in Ireland.

It was the third of three All-Ireland football titles won by Galway in the 1960s, which made them joint "team of the decade" with Down who also won three. However, Galway's three 1960s titles came consecutively.

In 2018, Martin Breheny listed this as the ninth greatest All-Ireland Senior Football Championship Final.

== Paths to the final ==
Galway, though reigning champions, approached the game as underdogs. Their opponents Meath had seen off Down in the semi-final.

== Pre-game ==
The teams kneeled to kiss the bishop's ring before the game got underway.

== Match ==
This year's final was played on 25 September.

=== Summary ===
This was to be, if not the battle of the century, at least the final of the decade. That was the assessment from all the pundits as Galway geared up to secure their third All-Ireland title in a row, against Meath. The credentials of both sides were perfect: Galway unbeaten since the 1963 All-Ireland SFC final with Dublin, against a Meath team that had put in an incredible second-half performance against Down to win by ten points. The champions, with the breeze behind them, made the early running. With 13 minutes gone they had strolled to a three-point lead. Despite the best efforts of the Meath side to keep the score that low against a Galway side who had the momentum, the crucial score came not long after. Cyril picked up possession and played the ball across the Meath goal. As it bounced across the face of Seán McCormack's goal, Mattie McDonagh came steaming in and planted the ball into the back of the net with relative ease. It was Galway's first goal in their "Three In A Row" assault. Thirty seconds later, Liam Sammon pointed, followed quickly by another from Séamus Leydon. This left it at 1–5 to no score in favour of Galway. Murty Sullivan got Meath off the mark but at half-time, they trailed by eight points, 1–6 to 0–1. A reshuffled Meath team re-opened the second half with promise, but the revival they sought, desperately needing a goal, never looked like coming. Meath outscored Galway in the second half but it was merely an irrelevant statistic as the Tribesmen had made it "Three In A Row", with a six-point victory. The ingredients were there for a thrilling contest were there for a thrilling contest, but on the day it all came apart for Meath and remained the same for a Galway side who made GAA history with their performance.

Mattie McDonagh scored a goal after 21 minutes and Galway led 1–6 to 0–1 at half-time, and went on to complete a three-in-a-row. McDonagh's goal came 11th in RTÉ's 2005 series Top 20 GAA Moments.

=== Details ===
Galway
Meath

Galway; Maroon & White Shirts/White Shorts/Maroon Socks	1–10 – 0–7 (final score after 60 minutes)	Meath; Green & Gold Shirts/White shorts/Green Socks
Manager: John 'Tull' Dunne Team: 1 Johnny Geraghty (GK); 2 Enda Colleran (c); 3 Noel Tierney; 4 Bosco McDermott; 5 Colie McDonagh; 6 Seán Meade (substituted off) ?'; 7 Martin L. Newell; 8 Jimmy Duggan; 9 Pat Donnellan; 10 Cyril Dunne; 11 Mattie McDonagh; 12 Séamus Leydon; 13 Liam Sammon; 14 Seán Cleary; 15 John Keenan Substitutes used: 17 John Donnellan for Meade (substituted on) ?'; Substitutes not used: 16 Frank McLoughlin; 18 Tom Sands; 19 Mick Reynolds; 20 Christy Tyrrell	Half-time: 1–6 – 0–1 Competition: All-Ireland Senior Football Championship (Final) Date: 15.30 BST; Sunday, September 25, 1966 Venue: Croke Park, Dublin Attendance: 71,569 Referee: Jimmy Hatton (Wicklow) Match rules: 60 minutes. Replay if scores still level. Maximum of 3 substitutions.	Manager: Fr. Patrick Tully Team: 1 Seán McCormack (GK); 2 Dinny Donnelly (substituted off) ?'; 3 Jack Quinn; 4 Peter Darby; 5 Pat Collier; 6 Bertie Cunningham; 7 Pat Reynolds; 8 Peter Moore; 9 Tom Browne; 10 Tony Brennan; 11 Murty Sullivan; 12 Davy Carty (c) (substituted off) ?'; 13 Gerry Quinn; 14 Noel Curran; 15 Ollie Shanley Substitutes used: 17 Mick White (substituted on) ?' for Donnelly; 18 Jack Fagan (substituted on) ?' (substituted off) ?' for Carty; 21 Martin Quinn (substituted on) ?' for Fagan; Substitutes not used: 16 Paddy Cromwell; 19 John Carolan; 20 Paddy Mulvany; 22 Vincent Foley; 23 L. Kierans; 24 Mick Mellett; 25 J. Walsh; 26 M. Lynch; 27 M. O'Brien

== Beitzel ==
Harry Beitzel, an Australian credited with pioneering the development of the composite rules sport International rules football, is said to have drawn inspiration from watching the 1966 All-Ireland Senior Football Championship Final on television, and in 1967 sent an Australian side – "The Galahs" – to play the game against an Irish side. Beitzel followed this up the next year with The Australian Football World Tour, a six-match series with games played against Irish teams in Ireland, the UK and United States. (The 1968 Galahs also played exhibition matches of Australian Rules throughout the tour, including a game in Bucharest, Romania.)
