= 1970 All-Ireland Senior Football Championship final =

- Event: 1970 All-Ireland Senior Football Championship
Kerry	Meath
2–19 (25)	0–18 (18)
- Date: 27 September 1970
- Venue: Croke Park, Dublin
- Referee: P. Kelly (Dublin)
- Attendance: 71,775

The 1970 All-Ireland Senior Football Championship final was the 83rd All-Ireland Final and the deciding match of the 1970 All-Ireland Senior Football Championship, an inter-county Gaelic football tournament for the top teams in Ireland.

== Match ==
=== Summary ===
Kerry won convincingly, with late goals by Din Joe Crowley and Mick Gleeson.

It was the first of four All-Ireland SFC titles won by Kerry in the 1970s.

=== Details ===
27 September 1970; Final	Kerry	2–19 – 0–18	Meath	Croke Park, Dublin; Attendance: 71,775; Referee: P. Kelly (Dublin)
27 September 1970; Final	B Lynch 0–5, M O'Dwyer 0–5, M Gleeson 1–1, DJ Crowley 1–0, P Griffin 0–2, E O'Donoghue 0–2, M O'Connell 0–2, L Higgins 0–2		M Fay 0–10, T Brennan 0–5, K Rennicks 0–2, V Lynch 0–1	Croke Park, Dublin; Attendance: 71,775; Referee: P. Kelly (Dublin)

Kerry
Meath

==== Kerry ====
- 1 J. Culloty
- 2 S. Murphy
- 3 P. O'Donoghue
- 4 D. O'Sullivan (c)
- 5 T. Prendergast
- 6 J. O'Keeffe
- 7 M. Ó Sé
- 8 M. O'Connell
- 9 D. J. Crowley
- 10 B. Lynch
- 11 P. Griffin
- 12 É. O'Donoghue
- 13 M. Gleeson
- 14 L. Higgins
- 15 M. O'Dwyer

Sub used
16 S. Mac Gearailt

Subs not used
17 D. Crowley
18 P. J. Burns
19 T. O'Donnell
20 P. Finnegan
Seán O'Shea was retrospectively awarded a medal in 2025; in 1970 not all nonplaying subs were entitled to a medal. O'Shea's application relied on the precedent of Mick Loftus, retrospectively awarded a medal as a nonplaying sub in the 1951 final.

Trainer
J. Lyne

==== Meath ====
- 1 S. McCormack
- 2 M. White
- 3 J. Quinn (c)
- 4 B. Cunningham
- 5 O. Shanley
- 6 T. Kearns
- 7 P. Reynolds
- 8 V. Foley
- 9 V. Lynch
- 10 T. Brennan
- 11 M. Kerrigan
- 12 M. Mellett
- 13 K. Rennicks
- 14 J. Murphy
- 15 M. Fay

Subs used
19 P. Moore for M. Mellett
22 B. Bligh for T. Kearns

Subs not used
16 E. McMahon
17 P. Black
18 F. Ward
20 C. Bowens
21 J. Fay
23 M. Costello
24 A. Burns
25 D. Gogarty
26 T. Brannigan
