= St Vincent's GAA (Meath) =

Gaelic sports club in County Meath, Ireland

St Vincent's
- Naomh Uinsionn
- Founded: 1895
- County: Meath
- Colours
- Grounds: St Vincent's GAA Club

Playing kits
Standard colours

Senior Club Championships
	All Ireland	Leinster champions	Meath champions
Football:	0	0	1

St Vincent's GAA is a Gaelic Athletic Association in Ardcath, County Meath, Ireland. The club is affiliated to the Meath County Board and fields teams primarily in Gaelic football.

== History ==
St Vincent's GAA was founded in 1895 and is located in the village of Ardcath, along with taking up players from the Clonalvy parish. St Vincent's have won 1 Meath SFC title which was in 1955, defeating Kells Harps 1–12 to 2-03. They were also runners-up in the competition in 1963, when they were beaten by Navan O'Mahonys 4–06 to 1-02.

St Vincent's won the Meath IFC title once in 1953. They contested another Meath IFC final in 1974, though were defeated by St John's.

St Vincent's have won two Meath JFC titles, one in 1948 and one in 2021. Over a stretch of seven years from 2018 to 2025, they had been runners-up 4 times.

As of 2026, St Vincent's compete in the Meath JFC.

== Honours ==
- Meath Senior Football Championship (1): 1955 (runners-up in 1963)
- Meath Intermediate Football Championship (1): 1953 (runners-up in 1974)
- Meath Junior 'A' Football Championship (2): 1948, 2021 (runners-up in 2018, 2020, 2024, 2025)

== Notable Players ==
- Christo Hand: All-Ireland SFC-winner (1949)
- Terry Kearns: All-Ireland SFC-winner (1967)

Preceded by Skryne	Meath Senior Football Champions; 1955	Succeeded by Syddan
