= Carnmore =

Electoral division in County Galway, Ireland

Carnmore An Carn Mór
- Electoral division
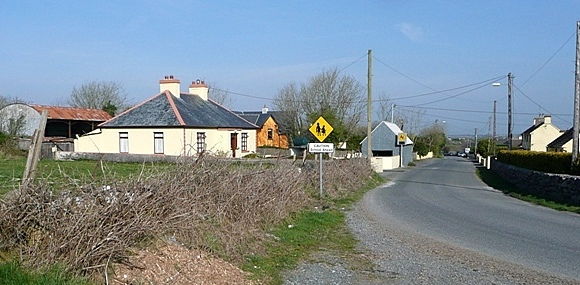
- School Road in Carnmore West townland

- Location in Ireland
- Coordinates: 53°18′25″N 8°54′33″W
- Country: Ireland
- Province: Connacht
- County: County Galway
- Elevation: 12 m (39 ft)
- Time zone: UTC+0 (WET)
  - Summer (DST): UTC-1 (IST (WEST))
- Irish Grid Reference: M395288

Carnmore (Irish: An Carn Mór) is an electoral area located at the southern end of the parish of Claregalway, approximately 8 miles (13 km) east of Galway city in County Galway, Ireland. Carnmore is in a Gaeltacht area, although the majority of residents use English as their first language. Incorporating the townlands of Carnmore, Carnmore West and Carnmore East, the area is represented in hurling competitions by Carnmore GAA. Galway Airport is also nearby.

== History ==
Archaeological sites in the area include a souterrain which had two or three chambers and a creep entrance to each chamber which were approximately 7-foot (2.1 m) high. There is also a lisheen, a small fort, in Carnmore where some local children (and adults) were buried. There are also several Dolmen-style (portal tomb) burial sites in the area. In Claregalway there is the Franciscan Friary, and the sites of five castles are located in the parish area: Claregalway, Cloghmoyle, Lydican, Lissarulla and Kiltrogue.

== Demographics ==
According to the 2016 census there were 2,577 people living in the Carnmore Electoral Division, with only 2.2% of the population indicating that they spoke Irish on a daily basis outside the education system. As of 2015, there were 164 pupils enrolled in the local primary school, Carnmore National School.

== Sport ==
Carnmore's hurling club, Carnmore GAA, was founded in 1944 – although hurling has been played in the parish since before the foundation of the GAA. The club fields teams in the Galway Intermediate Hurling Championship.

== Notable residents ==
- Máirtín Ó Cadhain was a school teacher in Carnmore in the 1930s.
- Colie McDonagh, All-Ireland Senior Football medallist in 1966
- Ryan Manning, Republic of Ireland international soccer player.
