= 1968 Cork Senior Football Championship =

Gaelic football competition

- Dates: 7 April 1968 – 6 October 1968
- Teams: 17
- Champions: Carbery (2nd title); Frank Kehilly (captain)
- Runners-up: Clonakilty; Kevin Dillon (captain)

Tournament statistics
- Matches played: 16
- Goals scored: 35 (2.19 per match)
- Points scored: 260 (16.25 per match)
- Top scorer(s): Tim F. Hayes (0-26)

The 1968 Cork Senior Football Championship was the 80th staging of the Cork Senior Football Championship since its establishment by the Cork County Board in 1887. The draw for the opening round fixtures took place on 28 January 1968. The championship began on 7 April 1968 and ended on 6 October 1968.

Beara entered the championship as the defending champions, however, they were beaten by University College Cork at the quarter-final stage.

On 6 October 1968, Carbery won the championship following a 1-09 to 1-06 defeat of Clonakilty in a final replay. This was their second championship title overall and their first title since 1937.

Clonakilty's Tim F. Hayes was the championship's top scorer with 0-26.

== Team changes ==
=== To Championship ===
Promoted from the Cork Intermediate Football Championship

- Urhan

== Results ==
=== First round ===
19 May 1968 First round	St. Finbarr's	1-07 - 1-12	St. Nicholas'	Cork Athletic Grounds
	D Murphy 1-0, C Roche 0-3, G McCarthy 0-1, N Ahern 0-1, M Horgan 0-1, B Murphy 0-1.		D Coughlan 1-2, J Daly 0-4, P Harte 0-3, D O'Driscoll 0-2, B Carroll 0-1.

=== Second round ===
7 April 1968 Second round	Na Piarsaigh	0-03 - 2-14	Seandún	Cork Athletic Grounds
	T Nott 0-2, D O'Leary 0-1.		F O'Connell 0-7, B Hurley 1-2, L McAuliffe 1-1, E O'Brien 0-3, T McAuliffe 0-1.

7 April 1968 Second round	Avondhu	0-13 - 1-08	Mitchelstown	Páirc Mac Gearailt
	J Horgan 0-8, D Ahern 0-2, W McAuliffe 0-2, T Monaghan 0-1.		J Barrett 0-5, M Smyth 1-0, R Honohan 0-3.

7 April 1968 Second round	Duhallow	0-06 - 0-09	Clonakilty	Castle Grounds
	W O'Leary 0-2, W O'Leary 0-2, D Morley 0-1, D Long 0-1.		TF Hayes 0-9.

7 April 1968 Second round	Beara	1-09 - 0-05	Carrigdhoun	Rossa Park
	M O'Regan 0-7, D Wiseman 1-0, C O'Sullivan 0-1, B O'Neill 0-1.		R Wylie 0-2, C Cooney 0-1, J Enright 0-1, M Begley 0-1.

14 April 1968 Second round	Macroom	1-09 - 0-13	Urhan	Wolfe Tone Park
	M McSweeney 0-5, M Kelleher 1-0, N Fitzgerald 0-3, D Judgle 0-1.		C O'Sullivan 0-7, P Foley 0-2, P O'Sullivan 0-2, JJ Murphy 0-1, S O'Neill 0-1.

5 May 1968 Second round	Carbery	4-05 - 0-04	Muskerry	Charlie Hurley Park
	J Carroll 2-0, M Farr 1-1, N Kehilly 1-1, D Hunt 0-2, T Holland 0-1.		M Buckley 0-4, F Cooper 0-1.

19 May 1968 Second round	Nemo Rangers	2-09 - 1-11	Imokilly	Riverstown Sportsfield
	J McCarthy 1-3, J Cooke 1-2, G Allen 0-1, D Barrett 0-1, B Barrett 0-1, M O'Driscoll 0-1.		A O'Donoghue 1-3, M Cronin 0-2, W Glavin 0-2, P O'Sullivan 0-1, P Fitzgerald 0-1.

30 June 1968 Second round	University College Cork	4-08 - 1-08	St. Nicholas'	Cork Athletic Grounds
	B Lynch 2-3, M Power 1-0, J O'O'Donoghue 1-0, E Philpott 0-1, E Ryan 0-1, C O'Sullivan 0-1, G O'Herlihy 0-1, P O'Doherty 0-1.		J Daly 0-5, D Moore 1-0, P Hurley 0-2, P Harte 0-1.

=== Quarter-finals ===
19 May 1968 Quarter-final	Clonakilty	4-04 - 1-10	Urhan	Wolfe Tone Park
	N Lane 2-0, T Hayes 1-0, TF Hayes 0-3, J O'Shea 0-1.		C O'Sullivan 1-7, J O'Neill 0-1, JJ Murphy 0-1, P Foley 0-1.

9 June 1968 Quarter-final	Seandún	0-10 - 0-05	Avondhu	Clonmult Memorial Park
	N O'Keeffe 0-4, E O'Brien 0-3, B Larkin 0-2, B Meade 0-1.		N Kirby 0-2, J Farrell 0-1, F Sheedy 0-1, T Monaghan 0-1.

7 July 1968 Quarter-final	Carbery	w/o - scr.	Nemo Rangers	Kinsale Grounds

11 August 1968 Quarter-final	University College Cork	1-09 - 1-06	Beara	Sam Maguire Park
	B Lynch 0-5, R Cummins 1-0, B O'Keeffe 0-2, P Doherty 0-1, E Ryan 0-1.		M O'Regan 1-3, B O'Neill 0-2, M O'Sullivan 0-1.

=== Semi-finals ===
28 July 1968 Semi-final	Clonakilty	0-10 - 1-06	Seandún	Charlie Hurley Park
	TF Hayes 0-5, T Hayes 0-2, F Hayes 0-1, N Lane 0-1, P O'Sullivan 0-1.		L McAuliffe 1-0, P Barry 0-2, T O'Neill 0-1, N O'Keeffe 0-1, T Cuthbert 0-1, D McCarthy 0-1.

1 September 1968 Semi-final	Carbery	5-05 - 1-09	University College Cork	Clonakilty Grounds
	B Evans 2-0, J Carroll 1-1, M Farr 1-0, N Kehilly 1-0, B Desmond 0-2, T Holland 0-2.		B Lynch 1-3, E Ryan 0-2, T Murphy 0-1, R Cummins 0-1, M Power 0-1, P O'Donoghue 0-1.

=== Finals ===
29 September 1968 Final	Carbery	0-09 - 0-09	Clonakilty	Cork Athletic Grounds
	T Holland 0-4, D Hunt 0-1, B Evans 0-1, B Desmond 0-1, D Kehilly 0-1, J Carroll 0-1.		TF Hayes 0-5, H de Long 0-2, F Hayes 0-2.	Attendance: 11,222; Referee: J Dennigan (Fermoy)

6 October 1968 Final replay	Carbery	1-09 - 1-06	Clonakilty	Cork Athletic Grounds
	D Hunt 1-3, T Holland 0-3, B Desmond 0-3.		TF Hayes 0-4, H de Long 1-0, P O'Sullivan 0-1, P Hayes 0-1.	Attendance: 11,352; Referee: J Dennigan (Fermoy)

== Championship statistics ==
=== Top scorers ===
Overall

Rank	Player	Club	Tally	Total	Matches	Average
1	Tim F. Hayes	Clonakilty	0-26	26	5	5.20
2	Brendan Lynch	UCC	3-11	20	3	6.66
3	Con O'Sullivan	Urhan	1-14	17	2	8.50
4	Mick O'Regan	Beara	1-10	13	2	6.50
5	Johnny Carroll	Carbery	3-02	11	4	2.75

In a single game

Rank	Player	Club	Tally	Total	Opposition
1	Con O'Sullivan	Urhan	1-07	10	Clonakilty
2	Brendan Lynch	UCC	2-03	9	St. Nicholas'
2	Tim F. Hayes	Clonakilty	0-09	9	Duhallow
4	Jerry Horgan	Avondhu	0-08	8	Mitchelstown
5	Con O'Sullivan	Urhan	0-07	7	Macroom
5	Frank O'Connell	Seandún	0-07	7	Na Piarsaigh
5	Mick O'Regan	Beara	0-07	7	Carrigdhoun

=== Miscellaneous ===
- Carbery win the title for the first time since 1937.
- Seandún qualified for the semi-final stage of the championship for the first time.
- Nemo Rangers withdrew from the championship after the club's request to move their fixture with Carbery.
