= Terry Kearns =

Irish Gaelic footballer (1945–2020)

Personal information
- Native name: Traolach O Ciaráin (Irish)
- Born: 1945 Ardcath, County Meath, Ireland
- Died: 15 October 2020 (aged 75) Bellewstown, County Meath, Ireland
- Height: 5 ft 10 in (178 cm)

Sport
- Sport: Gaelic Football
- Position: Midfield
Club
- Years: Club
- St Vincent's
Club titles
- Meath titles: 0
Inter-county
- Years: County
- Meath
Inter-county titles
- Leinster titles: 2
- All-Irelands: 1
- NFL: 0
- All Stars: 0

Terry Kearns (1945 – 15 October 2020) was an Irish Gaelic footballer. At club level he played with St Vincent's and was an All-Ireland Championship winner with the Meath county team.

== Playing career ==
A member of the St Vincent's club in Ardcath, County Meath, Kearns was full-back with the Meath minor football team for three successive seasons from 1961 until 1963. He was centre-back on the county's junior team that won the Leinster Junior Championship in 1964, before joining the under-21 team the following year. Kearns first played for the Meath senior team in a challenge game in December 1964; however, it would be 1967 before he became a regular member of the team. That year he claimed his first Leinster Senior Championship medal before winning an All-Ireland Championship medal at midfield after a 1-9 to 0-9 defeat of Cork in the final. Kearns won a second Leinster Senior Championship medal in 1970; however, Meath were subsequently beaten by Kerry in the All-Ireland final.

== Honours ==
Meath

- All-Ireland Senior Football Championship (1): 1967
- Leinster Senior Football Championship (2): 1967, 1970
- Leinster Junior Football Championship (1): 1964
