= Kevin Dillon (Gaelic footballer) =

Irish sportsperson (1941–2026)

Personal information
- Native name: Caoimhín Ó Diolún (Irish)
- Born: 1941 Duagh, County Kerry, Ireland
- Died: 12 November 2026 (aged 85) Wilton, Cork, Ireland
- Occupation: Agricultural adviser
- Height: 5 ft 8 in (173 cm)

Sport
- Sport: Gaelic football
- Position: Left wing-back
Club
- Years: Club
- Clonakilty
Club titles
- Cork titles: 0
Inter-county
Years	County	Apps (scores)
1966-1968	Cork	8 (0-00)
Inter-county titles
- Munster titles: 2
- All-Irelands: 0
- NFL: 0

Kevin Dillon (1941 – 12 November 2026) was an Irish Gaelic footballer. At club level he played with Duagh and Clonakilty and at inter-county level with the Cork senior football team.

== Career ==
Born and raised in Duagh, County Kerry, Dillon attended Rockwell College in Tipperary where he played Gaelic football and rugby. His involvement in the latter, as a member of the newly-formed club in Abbeyfeale, resulted in him being suspended from the Gaelic Athletic Association for two years.

Dillon moved to Clonakilty, County Cork in 1961, where he worked in the agricultural field. He immediately joined the local club and captained Clonakilty in their 1–09 to 1–06 defeat by Carbery in the 1968 Cork SFC final replay. Dillon won a South West JAFC medal as part of the club's junior team in 1977.

At inter-county level, Dillon first played for Cork as a member of the junior team in 1965 and 1966. His performances for the team resulted in an immediate call-up the senior team and he won consecutive Munster SFC medals in 1966 and 1967. Dillon lined out at left wing-back for Cork's 1–09 to 0–09 defeat by Meath in the 1967 All-Ireland SFC final.

Dillon also lined out for Bandon R.F.C. and was a founder-member of Clonakilty R.F.C. in 1977. He was the club's first captain and, in that capacity, he won a Minor A League title in 1980. Dillon later served as the club's president.

== Personal life and death ==
Dillon spent his entire professional life working in Clonakilty, initially with the Department of Agriculture. He established two farm enterprises, a pig farm and the Mountcarmel pedigree herd, and worked as a sales adviser for the CBS bovine genetics company. Dillon took on the job of Irish Holstein Friesian Association secretary, and then became IHFA’s first chief executive, until his retirement in 2009.

Dillon died on 12 November 2026, at the age of 85.

== Honours ==
Clonakilty

- South West Junior A Football Championship (1): 1977

Cork

- Munster Senior Football Championship (2): 1966, 1967
