= Noel Curran (Gaelic footballer) =

Irish Gaelic footballer

Personal information
- Native name: Nollaig Ó Corráin (Irish)
- Born: 1943 Moynalty, County Meath, Ireland
- Died: 1 June 2013 (aged 69) Harold's Cross, Dublin, Ireland
- Occupations: Publican, taxi driver
- Height: 5 ft 10 in (178 cm)

Sport
- Sport: Gaelic football
- Position: Full-forward
Clubs
- Years: Club
- Dunshaughlin; Thomas Davis
Club titles
- Meath titles: 0
Inter-county
Years	County	Apps (scores)
1965-1971	Meath	14 (2-22)
Inter-county titles
- Leinster titles: 2
- All-Irelands: 1
- NFL: 0
- All Stars: 0

Noel Curran (1943 – 1 June 2013) was an Irish Gaelic footballer who played for club sides Dunshaughlin and Thomas Davis and at inter-county level with the Meath senior football team. He usually lined out as a full-forward.

== Career ==
Curran played the vast majority of his club football with Dunshaughlin. He lined out with the local parish under-14 team St. Martin's in 1957 before first playing at adult level in 1961. He won a Meath JFC medal in 1967 before winning a Meath IFC title a decade later in 1977. Later in his career he joined the Thomas Davis club in Dublin. Curran first came to inter-county prominence as a member of the Meath junior football team beaten by Cork in the 1964 All-Ireland junior final. He made his senior team debut against Westmeath. Curran was full forward on the Meath team which beat Cork in the 1967 All-Ireland final, having occupied the same position in the final the previous year when Galway completed a three in-a-row. He missed out on Meath's 1970 All-Ireland final defeat to Kerry but returned to the team, for a spell during the early 1970s.

== Personal life and death ==
Curran spent the majority of his life living and working in Dublin. He worked in the bar trade in Phibsboro, Rialto and Ranelagh. Later, he worked in security at Bank of Ireland's headquarters on Baggot Street, and also did some taxi driving. His son, Paul Curran, was part of Dublin's 1995 All-Ireland Championship-winning team.

Curran died at Our Lady's Hospice in Harold's Cross on 1 June 2013.

== Honours ==
Dunshaughlin

- Meath Intermediate Football Championship: 1977
- Meath Junior Football Championship: 1967

Meath

- All-Ireland Senior Football Championship: 1967
- Leinster Senior Football Championship: 1966, 1967
