= Bertie Cunningham =

Irish Gaelic footballer (1939–2023)

Personal information
- Native name: Beircheart Mac Cuinneagáin (Irish)
- Born: 1939 Ballivor, County Meath, Ireland
- Died: 19 January 2023 (aged 83) Ballivor, County Meath, Ireland
- Height: 6 ft 0 in (183 cm)

Sport
- Sport: Gaelic football
- Position: Centre-back
Clubs
- Years: Club
- Ballivor; Killyon
Club titles
- Meath titles: 0
Inter-county
- Years: County
- 1958–1972: Meath
Inter-county titles
- Leinster titles: 4
- All-Irelands: 1
- NFL: 0

Bernard P. Cunningham (1939 – 19 January 2023) was an Irish Gaelic footballer. At club level played with Ballivor and at inter-county level with the Meath senior football team. Cunningham usually lined out as a centre-back.

== Playing career ==
Cunningham first played Gaelic football and hurling at Killyon NS before later attending both Trim CBS and Trim Vocational School. He won an All-Ireland Vocational Schools' medal with a Meath selection in 1956. At club level, Cunningham won county championship medals with the Ballivor juveniles in 1952 and 1954, before winning a Meath IFC title in 1971.

Cunningham first appeared on the inter-county scene with the Meath minor team that won the All-Ireland MFC title in 1957. He immediately progressed to the junior team before making his senior team debut in an O'Byrne Cup game in 1958. Cunningham won the first of four Leinster SFC medals in 1964. After losing the 1966 All-Ireland final to Galway, he was again at centre-back when Meath defeated Cork in the 1967 final. Cunningham ended the All-Ireland-winning season by being named Texaco Footballer of the Year.

== Coaching career ==
In retirement from playing, Cunningham was involved in coaching at all levels with Ballivor. He also spent a period as a selector with the Meath senior team.

== Death ==
Cunningham died on 19 January 2023, at the age of 83.

== Honours ==
Ballivor

- Meath Intermediate Football Championship: 1971

Meath

- All-Ireland Senior Football Championship: 1967
- Leinster Senior Football Championship: 1964, 1966, 1967, 1970
- All-Ireland Minor Football Championship: 1957
- Leinster Minor Football Championship: 1957

Awards
Preceded by Mattie McDonagh	Texaco Footballer of the Year; 1967	Succeeded by Seán O'Neill
