= Flor Hayes =

Irish Gaelic footballer

Personal information
- Native name: Flor Ó hAodha (Irish)
- Born: 1944 Clonakilty, County Cork, Ireland
- Died: 27 June 2014 (aged 70) London, England
- Height: 5 ft 10 in (178 cm)

Sport
- Sport: Gaelic football
- Position: Left corner-forward
Club
- Years: Club
- 1961–1972: Clonakilty
Club titles
- Cork titles: 0
Inter-county*
Years	County	Apps (scores)
1964–1969	Cork	12 (2–5)
Inter-county titles
- Munster titles: 2
- All-Irelands: 0
- NFL: 0
- *Inter County team apps and scores correct as of 17:50, 14 July 2014.

Florence G. Hayes (1944 – 27 June 2014) was an Irish Gaelic footballer who played as a left corner-forward for the Cork senior football team.

Born in Clonakilty, County Cork, Hayes first played competitive football during his schooling at St. Mary's College. He arrived on the inter-county scene at the age of seventeen when he first linked up with the Cork minor team, before later joining the under-21 side. He made his senior debut during the 1964 championship. Hayes went on to play a key role over the next few years and won two Munster medals. He was an All-Ireland runner-up on one occasion.

Hayes was a member of the Munster inter-provincial team on a number of occasions, however, he never won a Railway Cup medal. At club level he enjoyed a decade-long career in both codes with Clonakilty.

His brother, Tim F. Hayes, also played football for Cork.

Throughout his inter-county career, Hayes made 12 championship appearances for Cork. His retirement came following the conclusion of the 1969 championship.

== Honours ==
=== Team ===
Clonakilty

- West Cork Junior A Hurling Championship (2): 1961, 1962

Cork

- Munster Senior Football Championship (2): 1966, 1967
- All-Ireland Minor Football Championship (1): 1961
- Munster Minor Football Championship (1): 1961
