= Adam Elmeley =

Prior of Colpe and canon of Llanthony Prima

- Prior of Colpe
- Other post: Canon of Llanthony Prima

Personal details
- Born: Mid-14th century
- Died: After 1415

Adam Elmeley was prior of Colpe, an Irish cell of Llanthony Prima. He frequently served as Llanthony's attorney and representative in Ireland.

== Early life ==
Little is known about Elmeley's early life. Arlene Hogan speculated that he may have been from Colpe, where a John Elmeley held a cottage in 1408 and where people from Elmley in Worcestershire had settled. Hogan stated that if he were local he would have been sent to England for his education, as Llanthony Priory did not have the facilities to educate him in Ireland.

== Llanthony Priory ==
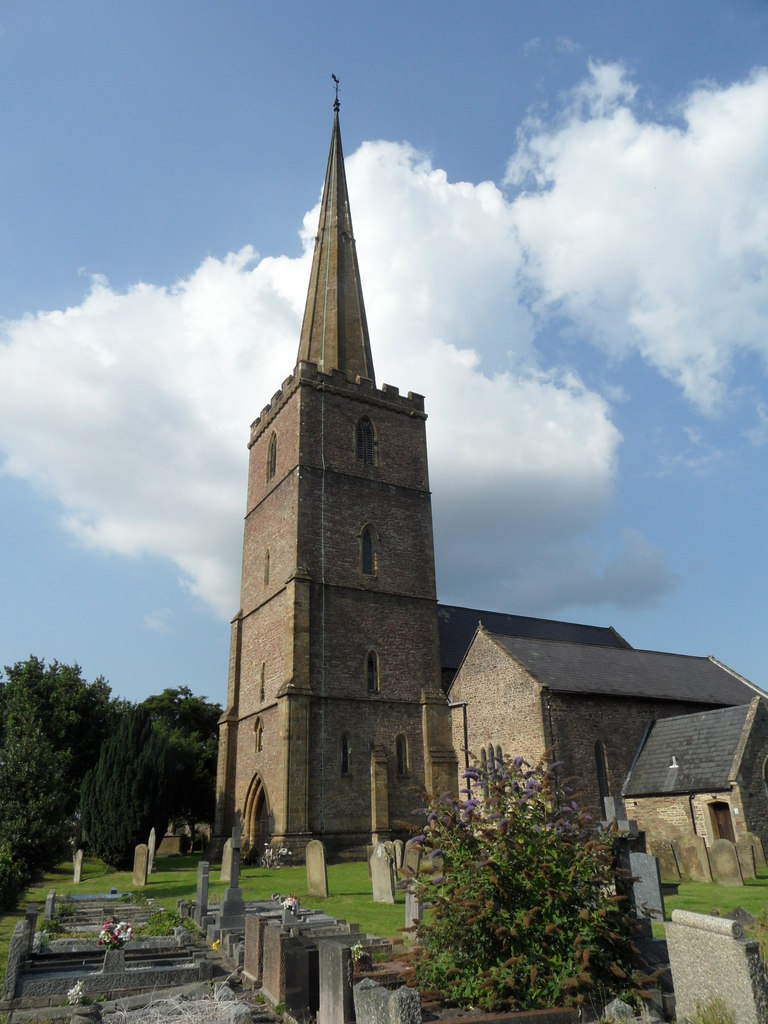
Lydney Church, where Adam Elmeley was ordained

Elmeley was ordained an acolyte with two other canons of Llanthony Prima at Lydney Church in Gloucestershire on 23 September 1363. He was ordained a deacon in 1364 and a priest the following year.

Between 1378 and 1413 he served as Llanthony Prima's procurator in Ireland and as the prior of its dependent cell at Colpe. In 1378 Elmeley was recorded as proctor in a case regarding the restoration of the church of Ardcath in the diocese of Meath. He was subsequently recorded several times as Llanthony's attorney and representative in Ireland, conducting litigation on the priory's behalf.

With William Temset he composed a cartulary of Llanthony Prima's possessions in Ireland in 1408.

In 1410, he was empowered to appoint an attorney for Llanthony rather than act as the priory's attorney himself. In 1415, he presented John Whyte, the rector of Drakestoun, to St Peter's at Drogheda where John took up the post of vicar, having exchanged roles with Nicholas Temset.
