= Mick Mellett =

Irish Gaelic footballer

Personal information
- Native name: Mícheál Ó Méalóid (Irish)
- Born: 1945 (age 80–81) Connemara, County Galway, Ireland
- Height: 5 ft 9 in (175 cm)

Sport
- Sport: Gaelic football
- Position: Left wing-forward
Club
- Years: Club
- Martinstown
Club titles
- Meath titles: 0
Inter-county
- Years: County
- 1966-1972: Meath
Inter-county titles
- Leinster titles: 3
- All-Irelands: 1
- NFL: 0

Michael Mellett (born 1945) is an Irish former Gaelic footballer who played for club side Martinstown and at inter-county level with the Meath senior football team. He usually lined out as a left wing-forward.

== Career ==
Mellett first came to sporting prominence as a schoolboy with Trim CBS. At club level, he lined out with Martinstown and won a Meath JFC in 1969 and a Meath IFC as part of a Martinstown-Athboy selection in 1979. Mellett first appeared on the inter-county scene as a dual player at minor level in 1963. He was selected for the Meath junior football team in 1966, while also lining out in both codes in the under-21 grade. Mellett was promoted to the senior team for a challenge game against Leitrim and was a member of the extended panel for the 1966 All-Ireland final defeat by Galway. He made the starting fifteen the following year and was at left wing-forward for the defeat of Cork in the 1967 All-Ireland final. Mellett's other honours include three Leinster Championship medals.

== Personal life ==
Mellett was born Mícheál Ó Méalóid in Connemara, County Galway. He moved to Ráth Chairn in the Meath Gaeltacht as a 10-year-old boy before settling in Dublin in 1973.

== Honours ==
Martinstown

- Meath Intermediate Football Championship: 1979
- Meath Junior Football Championship: 1969

Meath

- All-Ireland Senior Football Championship: 1967
- Leinster Senior Football Championship: 1964, 1966, 1967, 1970
