= Tim F. Hayes =

Irish Gaelic footballer (1946–2021)

Personal information
- Native name: Tadhg P. Ó hAodha (Irish)
- Born: 1946 Clonakilty, County Cork, Ireland
- Died: 6 April 2021 (aged 74) Clonakilty, County Cork, Ireland
- Height: 6 ft 3 in (191 cm)

Sport
- Sport: Gaelic football
- Position: Centre-back
Clubs
Years	Club	Apps (scores)
1963–1980 1971-1978	Clonakilty; Ballinhassig	40 (10-107)
Club titles
- Cork titles: 0
Inter-county*
Years	County	Apps (scores)
1966–1970	Cork	5 (0–04)
Inter-county titles
- Munster titles: 1
- All-Irelands: 0
- NFL: 0
- *Inter County team apps and scores correct as of 13:08, 30 July 2014.

Timothy F. Hayes (1946 – 6 April 2021) was an Irish Gaelic footballer who played for club side Clonakilty, at inter-county level with the Cork senior football team and with Munster. His Hurling Club was Ballinhassig where he won many honours. He lined out on both attack and defence.

== Career ==
Hayes first played competitive Gaelic football during his schooling at St. Mary's College, something which resulted in him being selected for the Cork minor team as a 16-year-old in 1962. It was the first of three years with the team, culminating with an All-Ireland minor final appearance in 1964. Hayes was still a minor when he was drafted onto the under-21 team, and he won two Munster Under-21 Championship titles. He joined his brother Flor Hayes on the Cork senior team in 1966 and won a Munster Championship title as a panel member in his debut year. Hayes made a number of championship appearances before his last game in 1970. Hayes also earned selection on the Munster team and made a county final appearance with Clonakilty in 1968.

With Ballinhassig he won a Junior titles in 1973 with runners-up on 1 occasion and a 2 intermediate titles in 1975, 1977 (captain).

== Honours ==
Cork

- Munster Senior Football Championship: 1966
- Munster Under-21 Football Championship: 1963, 1965
- Munster Minor Football Championship: 1964
