= Ken Rennicks =

Irish Gaelic footballer

Personal information
- Born: 1950 (age 75–76) Bohermeen, County Meath, Ireland
- Occupation: Tara Mines employee
- Height: 5 ft 11 in (180 cm)

Sport
- Sport: Gaelic football
- Position: Right corner-forward
Clubs
- Years: Club
- Bohermeen; Bohermeen-Martry; St Ultan's
Club titles
- Meath titles: 0
Inter-county
- Years: County
- 1969–1982: Meath
Inter-county titles
- Leinster titles: 1
- All-Irelands: 0
- NFL: 1
- All Stars: 1

Kenneth F. Rennicks (born 1950) is an Irish former Gaelic football player and coach who played for club sides Bohermeen, Bohermeen-Martry and St Ultan's and at inter-county level with the Meath senior football team.

== Career ==
Rennicks first came to prominence at club level with the Bohermeen juvenile team. He first lined out at inter-county level as a member of the Meath minor football team, before later earning selection for the under-21 and junior teams. Rennicks made his senior debut with Meath in October 1969. He won a Leinster Championship medal in his first full season before later lining out in the 1970 All-Ireland final defeat by Kerry. Rennicks claimed a National League title in 1975, while he also ended the season by being selected on the All-Star team. He also won a Railway Cup with Leinster. Rennicks ended his career at club level in 1981. He later became involved in team management and coaching and was a selector with the St Ultan's team that won the County Intermediate Championship title in 2008.

== Honours ==
Meath

- Leinster Senior Football Championship: 1970
- National Football League: 1974-75

Leinster

- Railway Cup: 1974

Awards

- All-Star: 1975
