= Peter Darby =

Irish Gaelic footballer and hurler (1938–2022)

Personal information
- Native name: Peadar Mac Diarmada (Irish)
- Born: 1938 Trim, County Meath, Ireland
- Died: 18 December 2022 (aged 84) Navan, County Meath, Ireland
- Occupation: Sales rep
- Height: 5 ft 10 in (178 cm)

Sport
- Sport: Gaelic football
- Position: Left corner-back
Club
- Years: Club
- Trim
Club titles
	Football	Hurling
Meath titles	1	5
Inter-county
- Years: County
- 1958-1968: Meath
Inter-county titles
- Leinster titles: 3
- All-Irelands: 1
- NFL: 0

Peter J. Darby (1938 – 18 December 2022) was an Irish Gaelic footballer and hurler who played at club level with Trim and at inter-county level with the Meath senior teams. He usually lined out as a defender.

== Playing career ==
Darby enjoyed a hugely successful club career as a dual player with Trim. In 1962 he captained the team from full-back to their only Keegan Cup triumph, while he also won five Meath SHC titles. After a period with the Meath minor team, Darby made his senior team debut as a 19-year-old against Dublin in 1958. He was one of the key figures on the team that made a breakthrough and won the Leinster Championship in 1964. Darby was at left corner-back for the All-Ireland final defeat by Galway. He was named captain of the team the following year and was again at left corner-back when Meath beat Cork in the 1967 All-Ireland final.

== Post-playing career ==
In retirement from playing Darby served as chairman of the Trim club, was a Meath senior selector and an officer of the Meath County Board. He was inducted into the Meath GAA Hall of Fame in December 2017.

Darby died on 18 December 2022, at the age of 84.

== Honours ==
Trim

- Meath Senior Football Championship: 1962 (c)
- Meath Senior Hurling Championship: 1955, 1956, 1957, 1959, 1960

Meath

- All-Ireland Senior Football Championship: 1967
- Leinster Senior Football Championship: 1964, 1966, 1967
- Leinster Junior Hurling Championship: 1961

Sporting positions
Preceded by	Meath senior football team captain 1963	Succeeded by Dinny Donnelly
Preceded by Dave Carty	Meath senior football team captain 1967	Succeeded by Jack Quinn
Achievements
Preceded by Enda Colleran	All-Ireland Senior Football Final winning captain 1967	Succeeded by Joe Lennon
