= Mick O'Loughlin =

Mick O'Loughlin may refer to:

- Mick O'Loughlin (Gaelic footballer)
- Mick O'Loughlin (Australian footballer)

== See also ==
- Michael O'Loughlin, Australian rules footballer
- Michael O'Loughlin (cyclist)
