= Johnny Geraghty =

Galway Gaelic footballer

Personal information
- Native name: Seán Mag Oireachtaigh (Irish)
- Nickname: The cat
- Born: 20 June 1942 (age 84) Kilkerrin, Galway, Ireland
- Occupation: Secondary school teacher
- Height: 5 ft 8 in (173 cm)

Sport
- Sport: Gaelic football
- Position: Goalkeeper
Clubs
- Years: Club
- Kilkerrin; Mountbellew–Moylough; Fr Griffin's
Club titles
- Galway titles: 2
College
- Years: College
- 1961–1965: University College Galway
College titles
- Sigerson titles: 1
Inter-county
- Years: County
- 1964–1969: Galway
Inter-county titles
- Connacht titles: 4
- All-Irelands: 3
- NFL: 1

John Geraghty (born 20 June 1942) is an Irish former Gaelic footballer who played at club level with Kilkerrin, Mountbellew–Moylough and Fr Griffin's and at inter-county level with the Galway senior football team. He usually lined out as a goalkeeper.

== Playing career ==
Geraghty first came to Gaelic football prominence during his student days. He won a Hogan Cup title with St Jarlath's College in 1960 before later winning a Sigerson Cup title with University College Galway. At club level he won consecutive Galway SFC titles with the Mountbellew–Moylough club. Geraghty first appeared on the inter-county scene as a member of the Galway minor football team in 1960. He won a Connacht Minor Championship title in 1960 but missed the All-Ireland final win over Cork. Geraghty was promoted to the Galway senior team for a tournament game against Meath in November 1963. He quickly became the first-choice goalkeeper and won three consecutive All-Ireland Championship titles from 1964 to 1966. Geraghty's other inter-county honours include Conancht Championship medals and a National League title. He also won a Railway Cup medal with Connacht. Geraghty was a three-time Cúchulainn Award-winner and was later named on the Galway Football Team of the Millennium.

== Coaching career ==
Geraghty had two stints in team management after his playing days ended, leading the Galway minor football team to the All-Ireland Championship title in 1976 and later coaching the Connacht Railway Cup team. He was also approached to take over as Galway senior team manager.

== Personal life ==
Geraghty's career as an Irish and Latin teacher took him through the vocational schools in Edenderry and Glenamaddy before taking a position in Coláiste Iognáid in Galway. He later qualified as a physical education teacher. Geraghty was forced out of teaching in 1993, having suffered from arthritis in both hips, which necessitated replacements. He subsequently studied law, qualifying in 1999.

== Honours ==
=== Player ===
St Jarlath's College

- All-Ireland Colleges Senior Football Championship: 1960
- Connacht Colleges Senior Football Championship: 1960

University College Galway

- Sigerson Cup: 1964

Mountbellew–Moylough

- Galway Senior Football Championship: 1964, 1965

Galway

- All-Ireland Senior Football Championship: 1964, 1965, 1966
- Connacht Senior Football Championship: 1964, 1965, 1966, 1968
- National Football League: 1964-65
- Connacht Minor Football Championship: 1960

Connacht

- Railway Cup: 1967

=== Coach ===
Galway

- All-Ireland Minor Football Championship: 1976
- Connacht Minor Football Championship: 1976
