= Dave Carty =

Irish Gaelic footballer

Personal information
- Native name: Daithí Ó Cárthaigh (Irish)
- Born: 1941 (age 84–85) Skryne, County Meath, Ireland
- Occupation: Farmer
- Height: 5 ft 8 in (173 cm)

Sport
- Sport: Gaelic football
- Position: Left wing-forward
Club
- Years: Club
- Skryne
Club titles
- Meath titles: 1
Inter-county
- Years: County
- Meath
Inter-county titles
- Leinster titles: 3
- All-Irelands: 1
- NFL: 0

David Carty (born 1941 ) is an Irish former Gaelic footballer who played for club side Skryne and at inter-county level with the Meath senior football team. He usually lined out as a forward.

== Honours ==
Skryne

- Meath Senior Football Championship: 1965 (c)

Meath

- All-Ireland Senior Football Championship: 1967
- Leinster Senior Football Championship: 1964, 1966 (c), 1967

Sporting positions
Preceded by Martin Quinn	Meath senior football team captain 1966	Succeeded by Peter Darby
