= 1957 All-Ireland Minor Football Championship =

Gaelic football competition

All-Ireland Champions
- Winning team: Meath (1st win)

All-Ireland Finalists
- Losing team: Armagh

Provincial Champions
- Munster: Kerry
- Leinster: Meath
- Ulster: Armagh
- Connacht: Mayo

The 1957 All-Ireland Minor Football Championship was the 26th staging of the All-Ireland Minor Football Championship, the Gaelic Athletic Association's premier inter-county Gaelic football tournament for boys under the age of 18.

Dublin entered the championship as defending champions, however, they were defeated in the Leinster Championship.

On 22 September 1957, Meath won the championship following a 3–9 to 0–4 defeat of Armagh in the All-Ireland final. This was their first All-Ireland title.

== Results ==
=== Connacht Minor Football Championship ===
Quarter-final

Mayo beat Roscommon.

Semi-finals

Mayo 5-4 Galway 1–4.

Leitrim 1-6 Sligo 0–2.

Final

Mayo 4-4 Leitrim 2-5 Pearse Stadium.

=== All-Ireland Minor Football Championship ===
Semi-finals

4 August 1957 Semi-final	Meath	3-08 - 1-07	Mayo	Dr. Hyde Park, Roscommon

11 August 1957 Semi-final	Armagh	3-07 - 3-05	Kerry	Croke Park, Dublin

Final

22 September 1957 Final	Meath	3-09 - 0-04	Armagh	Croke Park, Dublin

== Championship statistics ==
=== Miscellaneous ===
- Meath win the Leinster title for the first time in their history.
