= Paddy Cromwell =

Irish Gaelic footballer

Personal information
- Native name: Pádraig Cromail (Irish)
- Born: 1942 Skryne, County Meath, Ireland
- Died: 9 November 2002 (aged 60) Trim, County Meath, Ireland
- Height: 5 ft 9 in (175 cm)

Sport
- Sport: Gaelic football
- Position: Goalkeeper
Club
- Years: Club
- Skryne
Club titles
- Meath titles: 1
Inter-county
- Years: County
- Meath
Inter-county titles
- Leinster titles: 3
- All-Irelands: 1
- NFL: 0

Patrick P. Cromwell (1942 – 9 November 2002) was an Irish Gaelic footballer who played for club side Skryne and at inter-county level with the Meath senior football team. He usually lined out as a goalkeeper.

== Honours ==
Skryne

- Meath Senior Football Championship: 1965

Meath

- All-Ireland Senior Football Championship: 1967
- Leinster Senior Football Championship: 1964, 1966, 1967
