= Con O'Sullivan =

Irish Gaelic footballer (born 1937)

Personal information
- Native name: Conchur Ó Súilleabháin (Irish)
- Nickname: Paddy
- Born: 1937 (age 88–89) Urhan, County Cork, Ireland
- Height: 5 ft 10 in (178 cm)

Sport
- Sport: Gaelic football
- Position: Full-forward
Clubs
- Years: Club
- Urhan; Beara
Club titles
- Cork titles: 1
- Munster titles: 1
Inter-county
Years	County	Apps (scores)
1956-1968	Cork	23 (2-41)
Inter-county titles
- Munster titles: 2
- All-Irelands: 0
- NFL: 0
- All Stars: 0

Cornelius O'Sullivan (born 1937) is an Irish former Gaelic footballer who played for Cork Championship club Urhan. He was a member of the Cork senior football team for 12 years, during which time he lined out in a variety of positions but mostly at full-forward.

== Honours ==
Urhan

- Cork Intermediate Football Championship (1): 1967
- Cork Junior Football Championship (1): 1960
- Beara Junior Football Championship (5): 1955, 1956, 1957, 1958, 1959

Beara

- Munster Senior Club Football Championship (1): 1967
- Cork Senior Football Championship (1): 1967

Cork

- Munster Senior Football Championship (2): 1966, 1967
- Munster Junior Football Championship (1): 1957
