= Paddy Mulvany =

Irish Gaelic footballer

Personal information
- Native name: Pádraig Ó Maoilmhána (Irish)
- Born: 1940 (age 85–86) Skryne, County Meath, Ireland
- Occupations: Farmer, haulier
- Height: 5 ft 8 in (173 cm)

Sport
- Sport: Gaelic football
- Position: Right corner-forward
Clubs
- Years: Club
- Skryne; Kilmessan
Club titles
- Meath titles: 1
Inter-county
- Years: County
- Meath
Inter-county titles
- Leinster titles: 3
- All-Irelands: 1
- NFL: 0

Patrick F. Mulvany (born 1940) is an Irish former Gaelic footballer who played for club side Skryne and at inter-county level with the Meath senior football team. He usually lined out as a right corner-forward.

== Honours ==
Skryne

- Meath Senior Football Championship: 1965

Meath

- All-Ireland Senior Football Championship: 1967
- Leinster Senior Football Championship: 1964, 1966, 1967
- All-Ireland Junior Football Championship: 1962
- Leinster Junior Football Championship: 1962
