= 1976 All-Ireland Minor Football Championship =

Gaelic football competition

Championship details

All-Ireland Champions
- Winning team: Galway (4th win)

All-Ireland Finalists
- Losing team: Cork

Provincial Champions
- Munster: Cork
- Leinster: Dublin
- Ulster: Tyrone
- Connacht: Galway

The 1976 All-Ireland Minor Football Championship was the 45th staging of the All-Ireland Minor Football Championship, the Gaelic Athletic Association's premier inter-county Gaelic football tournament for boys under 18.

Kerry entered the championship as defending champions; however, they were defeated by Cork in the Munster final.

On 26 September 1976, Galway won the championship following a 1–10 to 0–6 defeat of Cork in the All-Ireland final. This was their fourth All-Ireland title overall and their first in six championship seasons.

== Results ==
=== Connacht Minor Football Championship ===
Quarter-Final

1976 Quarter-Final	Leitrim	0-09 — 1-12	Mayo	Ballyhaunis

Semi-Finals

1976 Semi-Final	Galway	0-18 — 2-07	Mayo	Dr Hyde Park, Roscommon

1976 Semi-Final	Roscommon	3-07 — 4-07	Sligo	Corran Park, Ballymote

Final

4 July 1976 Final	Galway	6-16 — 0-03	Sligo	St Jarlath's Park, Tuam

=== Leinster Minor Football Championship ===
Preliminary Round

1976 Preliminary Round	Meath	1-15 — 0-07	Wicklow	Croke Park, Dublin

1976 Preliminary Round	Westmeath	1-11 — 1-03	Wexford	Geraldine Park, Athy

1976 Preliminary Round	Laois	1-12 — 1-03	Carlow	Geraldine Park, Athy

1976 Preliminary Round	Longford	4-08 — 0-02	Kilkenny	O'Connor Park, Tullamore

Quarter-Finals

1976 Quarter-Final	Louth	1-07 — 0-08	Wexford	Croke Park, Carlow

1976 Quarter-Final	Kildare	0-09 — 0-09	Laois	Dr Cullen Park, Carlow

1976 Quarter-Final	Dublin	2-11 — 2-06	Longford	Cusack Park, Mullingar

1976 Quarter-Final	Offaly	1-09 — 1-06	Meath	Cusack Park, Mullingar

Semi-Finals

1976 Semi-Final	Dublin	0-10 — 0-09	Kildare	O'Connor Park, Tullamore

1976 Semi-Final	Louth	1-07 — 1-19	Offaly	Croke Park, Dublin

Final

25 July 1976 Final	Dublin	2-08 — 0-13	Offaly	Croke Park, Dublin

=== Munster Minor Football Championship ===
Quarter-Finals

May 1976 Quarter-Final	Limerick	1-08 — 0-07	Clare	Gaelic Grounds, Limerick

May 1976 Quarter-Final	Waterford	4-06 — 3-07	Tipperary	Fraher Field, Dungarvan

May 1976 Quarter-Final	Kerry	4-18 — 1-03	New York	Austin Stack Park, Tralee

Semi-Finals

June 1976 Semi-Final	Kerry	3-10 — 3-07	Waterford	Cappoquin

June 1976 Semi-Final	Cork	0-14 — 1-07	Limerick	Gaelic Grounds, Limerick

Final

11 July 1976 Final	Cork	0-10 — 1-05	Kerry	Páirc Uí Chaoimh, Cork

=== Ulster Minor Football Championship ===
Preliminary Round

May 1976 Preliminary Round	Armagh	2-19 — 1-03	Fermanagh	Athletic Grounds, Armagh

Quarter-Finals

June 1976 Quarter-Final	Cavan	4-13 — 1-02	Donegal	Breffni Park, Cavan

June 1976 Quarter-Final	Tyrone	1-11 — 1-07	Monaghan	Dungarvan

June 1976 Quarter-Final	Down	0-14 — 0-09	Antrim	Casement Park, Belfast

June 1976 Quarter-Final	Derry	1-07 — 2-04	Armagh	Healy Park, Omagh

Semi-Finals

June 1976 Semi-Final	Cavan	1-05 — 1-04	Down	St. Mary's Park, Castleblaney

June 1976 Semi-Final	Armagh	1-09 — 2-11	Tyrone	St Tiernach's Park, Clones

Final

18 July 1976 Final	Cavan	1-09 — 5-07	Tyrone	St Tiernach's Park, Clones

=== All-Ireland Minor Football Championship ===
Semi-Finals

8 August 1976 Semi-Final	Cork	3-08 — 1-04	Tyrone	Croke Park, Dublin

29 August 1976 Semi-Final	Galway	2-08 — 2-07	Dublin	Croke Park, Dublin

Final

26 September 1976 Final	Galway	1-10 — 0-06	Cork	Croke Park, Dublin
