= Paddy Reynolds =

Irish Gaelic footballer

Personal information
- Native name: Pádraig Óg Mac Ránaill (Irish)

Sport
- Sport: Gaelic football
- Position: Half back
Club
- Years: Club
- Walterstown
Inter-county
- Years: County
- 1996–2005: Meath
Inter-county titles
- Leinster titles: 3
- All-Irelands: 2
- All Stars: 1

Patrick Reynolds, known as Paddy, is a former Gaelic footballer who played for the Meath county football team from 1996 to 2005.

He was part of the Meath team which won the All-Ireland Senior Football Championship in 1996 and 1999. Reynolds was made team captain by manager Seán Boylan for the 2004 season.

He was awarded an All-Star in 1999.

He is the son of former Meath footballer Pat Reynolds.
