= Seán McCormack =

Irish Gaelic footballer (1940–2023)

Personal information
- Native name: Seán Mac Cormaic (Irish)
- Born: 1943 Kilmainhamwood, County Meath, Ireland
- Died: 19 May 2023 (aged 79) Kilmainhamwood, County Meath, Ireland
- Occupation: Car salesman
- Height: 5 ft 9 in (175 cm)

Sport
- Sport: Gaelic football
- Position: Goalkeeper
Clubs
- Years: Club
- Kilmainhamwood; Gaeil Colmcille; Nobber; Kingscourt Stars
Club titles
- Meath titles: 0
Inter-county
- Years: County
- 1964-1972: Meath
Inter-county titles
- Leinster titles: 4
- All-Irelands: 1
- NFL: 0
- All Stars: 0

Seán McCormack (1943 – 19 May 2023) was an Irish Gaelic football player and manager. At club level he played with a number of clubs, including Gaeil Colmcille, Nobber and Kingscourt Stars. He was also a member of the Meath senior football team.

== Career ==
Born in Kilmainhamwood, County Meath, McCormack first played Gaelic football at minor club level. He was part of the Castletown/Kilmainhamwood team that won the [[Meath Minor Football Championship[|Meath MFC]] title in 1961. McCormack later played at adult level with a number of clubs, including Gaeil Colmcille, Nobber and Kingscourt Stars, before ending his career with Kilmainhamwood.

McCormack first appeared on the inter-county scene at minor level with Meath in 1960. He later progressed to the Meath junior team and was at corner-back when they won the All-Ireland JFC title in 1962. By the time the junior team won a second Leinster JFC in 1964, Mccormack had been moved to the goalkeeping position.

McCormack was the senior team's sub-goalkeeper when they won the Leinster SFC title in 1964. He played his first game with the senior team in tournament against Dublin in 1965, before becoming first-choice goalkeeper a year later. McCormack won an All-Ireland SFC medal after a defeat of Cork in the 1967 All-Ireland final, having earlier claimed consecutive Leinster SFC medals. He won a fourth Leinster SFC medal in 1970.

== Death ==
McCormack died at his home on 19 May 2023, at the age of 79.

== Honours ==
Gaeil Colmcille

- Meath Minor Football Championship: 1959

Meath

- All-Ireland Senior Football Championship: 1967
- Leinster Senior Football Championship: 1964, 1966, 1967, 1970
- All-Ireland Junior Football Championship: 1962
- Leinster Junior Football Championship: 1962, 1964
