= 1956 All-Ireland Minor Football Championship =

Gaelic football competition

All-Ireland Champions
- Winning team: Dublin (5th win)

All-Ireland Finalists
- Losing team: Leitrim

Provincial Champions
- Munster: Limerick
- Leinster: Dublin
- Ulster: Donegal
- Connacht: Leitrim

The 1956 All-Ireland Minor Football Championship was the 25th staging of the All-Ireland Minor Football Championship, the Gaelic Athletic Association's premier inter-county Gaelic football tournament for boys under the age of 18.

Dublin entered the championship as defending champions.

On 7 October 1956, Dublin won the championship following a 5-14 to 2-2 defeat of Leitrim in the All-Ireland final. This was their fifth All-Ireland title overall and their third in succession.

Referee: Gus Cremin, from Kerry.

== Results ==
=== Connacht Minor Football Championship ===
Quarter-Final

Mayo 2-10 Galway 2-6

Semi-Finals

Roscommon 1-9 Mayo 1-5.

Sligo 4-6 Leitrim 1-8 Ballinamore Replay.

Final

Roscommon 2-7 Sligo 1-6 Sligo.

=== All-Ireland Minor Football Championship ===
Semi-Finals

Leitrim 1-9 Donegal 2-1

Final

7 October 1956 Final	Dublin	5-14 - 2-02	Leitrim	Croke Park, Dublin

== Championship statistics ==
=== Miscellaneous ===
- In the provincial championships there are a number of firsts as Donegal and Limerick win the respective Ulster and Munster titles for the first time.
- Dublin become the first team to win three successive All-Ireland titles.
