= 1967 Cork Senior Football Championship =

Staging of championship

- Dates: 23 April 1967 – 29 October 1967
- Teams: 16
- Champions: Beara (5th title); Seán Power (captain)
- Runners-up: University College Cork; Denis Philpott (captain)

Tournament statistics
- Matches played: 17
- Goals scored: 60 (3.53 per match)
- Points scored: 253 (14.88 per match)
- Top scorer(s): Eric Philpott (2-17); Con O'Sullivan (1-20)

The 1967 Cork Senior Football Championship was the 79th staging of the Cork Senior Football Championship since its establishment by the Cork County Board in 1887. The draw for the opening round fixtures took place on 29 January 1967. The championship began on 23 April 1967 and ended on 29 October 1967.

St. Nicholas' entered the championship as the defending champions, however, they were beaten by University College Cork in the first round.

On 29 October 1967, Beara won the championship following a 2-05 to 0-07 defeat of University College Cork in a final replay. It was their fifth championship title overall and their first title since 1940.

Eric Philpott and Con O'Sullivan were the championship's joint top scorers.

== Team changes ==
=== To Championship ===
Promoted from the Cork Intermediate Football Championship

- Na Piarsaigh

=== From Championship ===
Regraded to the Cork Intermediate Football Championship

- Millstreet

== Results ==
=== First round ===
23 April 1967 First round	Carrigdhoun	0-07 - 0-06	Clonakilty	Kinsale
	J Murphy 0-2, T Sheehan 0-2, M Begley 0-2, C Cooney 0-1.		T Connolly 0-2, Flor Hayes 0-2, J O'Donovan 0-1, Finbarr Hayes 0-1.

23 April 1967 First round	Duhallow	2-03 - 2-09	Beara	Sam Maguire Park, Dunmanway
	W O'Leary 1-3, M O'Loughlin 1-0.		P O'Sullivan 2-0, Con O'Sullivan 0-4, J O'Sullivan 0-3, Cormac O'Sullivan 0-1, J Downing 0-1.

23 April 1967 First round	Nemo Rangers	1-05 - 0-08	Seandún	Cork Athletic Grounds, Cork
	B Barrett 1-0, J Barrett 0-2, T Healy 0-2, D Barrett 0-1.		P Barry 0-4, N O'Keeffe 0-1, B O'Neill 0-1, P Goggin 0-1, K O'Sullivan 0-1.

30 April 1967 First round	St. Nicholas'	1-05 - 2-13	University College Cork	Cork Athletic Grounds, Cork
	F O'Neill 1-0, W Carroll 0-3, J O'Sullivan 0-1, D O'Driscoll 0-1.		B Hurley 2-0, P Fitzpatrick 0-4, P O'Connell 0-3, E Philpott 0-3, E Ryan 0-2, B O'Keeffe 0-1.

7 May 1967 First round replay	Seandún	0-05 - 3-08	Nemo Rangers	Cork Athletic Grounds, Cork
	P Barry 0-3, N O'Neill 0-2.		T Healy 1-4, P O'Brien 2-0, J Barrett 0-1, J Cawley 0-1, J McCarthy 0-1, B Barrett 0-1.

7 May 1967 First round	St. Finbarr's	4-06 - 1-09	Mitchelstown	Cork Athletic Grounds, Cork
	G McCarthy 1-2, N Ahern 1-1, D Murphy 1-1, M Archer 1-0, C Roche 0-2.		J Barrett 1-5, M Barrett 0-2, E Fleming 0-2.

7 May 1967 First round	Macroom	1-04 - 3-13	Carbery	Charlie Hurley Park, Bandon
	J Long 1-0, G Healy 0-3, T O'Leary 0-1.		M Bambury 3-0, J Carroll 0-3, D Hunt 0-3, R O'Neill 0-2, T Holland 0-2, P Galvin 0-1.

7 May 1967 First round	Imokilly	3-07 - 3-08	Muskerry	Cork Athletic Grounds, Cork
	S O'Connor 1-2, T Meaney 1-1, C Moroney 1-0, P Fitzgerald 0-3, J Long 0-1.		D McCarthy 2-3, N McCarthy 1-0, S McCarthy 0-3, B Fitton 0-2.

21 May 1967 First round	Avondhu	4-06 - 3-06	Na Piarsaigh	Riverstown
	W Hanrahan 1-4, N Kirby 2-0, T Monaghan 1-2.		J Buckley 2-0, S Gillen 1-3, T Nott 0-2, D Sheehan 0-1.

=== Quarter-finals ===
4 June 1967 Quarter-final	Beara	2-09 - 1-04	Muskerry	Sam Maguire Park, Dunmanway
	D Mullins 1-2, J Sullivan 1-1, Con O'Sullivan 0-3, P O'Sullivan 0-1, M Hanley 0-1.		L Daly 1-1, J Donoghue 0-1, J Galvin 0-1, B Fitton 0-1.

11 June 1967 Quarter-final	Carbery	1-17 - 2-04	Carrigdhoun	Clonakilty
	J Carroll 0-7, M Bambury 1-2, P Galvin 0-3, D Hunt 0-2, N Kiely 0-2, T Holland 0-1.		B Wiley 1-1, J Flynn 1-0, J Enright 0-1, M Begley 0-1, C McGrath 0-1.

25 June 1967 Quarter-final	St. Finbarr's	3-06 - 0-05	Avondhu	Páirc Mac Gearailt, Fermoy
	C Roche 1-4, D Murphy 1-0, G McCarthy 1-0, C Cullinane 0-1, C McCarthy 0-1.		W Hanrahan 0-3, T Monaghan 0-1, W Cronin 0-1.

8 July 1967 Quarter-final	University College Cork	4-15 - 1-05	Nemo Rangers	Cork Athletic Grounds, Cork
	E Philpott 2-5, P O'Connell 2-0, R Cummins 0-3, M Fleming 0-2, B Hurley 0-2, M Power 0-1, D Philpott 0-1, E Ryan 0-1.		T Healy 1-4, B Barrett 0-1.

=== Semi-finals ===
27 August 1967 Semi-final	University College Cork	1-09 - 0-07	Carbery	Kinsale
	D Geaney 1-1, E Philpott 0-3, E Ryan 0-3, R Cummins 0-2.		P Galvin 0-3, J Carroll 0-2, D Hunt 0-1, N Kehilly 0-1.

10 September 1967 Semi-final	Beara	1-12 - 3-04	St. Finbarr's	O'Donovan Rossa, Skibbereen
	Cormac O'Sullivan 1-1, Con O'Sullivan 0-4, B O'Neill 0-2, P Lyne 0-2, D Mullins 0-1, J Downing 0-1, Paul O'Sullivan 0-1.		D Murphy 2-0, M Archer 1-0, C Roche 0-2, G McCarthy 0-2.

=== Final ===
15 October 1967 Finals	Beara	3-08 - 3-08	University College Cork	Cork Athletic Grounds, Cork
	Con O'Sullivan 1-4, Cormac O'Sullivan 1-1, P O'Sullivan 0-1, M O'Sullivan 0-1, P Lynch 0-1.		E Ryan 0-4, P O'Connell 1-0, M Fleming 1-0, D Philpott 1-0, E Philpott 0-3, B Hurley 0-1.	Attendance: 12,380; Referee: D Owens (St. Nicholas')

29 October 1967 Final replay	Beara	2-05 - 0-07	University College Cork	Cork Athletic Grounds, Cork
	Cormac O'Sullivan 2-0, Con O'Sullivan 0-5.		E Philpott 0-3, P O'Connell 0-1, E Ryan 0-1, M Fleming 0-1, D Philpott 0-1.	Attendance: 15,000; Referee: D Owens (St. Nicholas')

== Championship statistics ==
=== Top scorers ===
Top scorers overall

Rank	Player	Club	Tally	Total	Matches	Average
1	Eric Philpott	UCC	2-17	23	5	4.60
1	Con O'Sullivan	Beara	1-20	23	5	4.60
3	Tim Healy	Nemo Rangers	2-10	16	3	5.33
4	Cormac O'Sullivan	Beara	4-03	15	5	3.00
5	Mick Bambury	Carbery	4-02	14	2	7.00
6	Denis Murphy	St. Finbarr's	4-01	13	3	4.33
6	Paddy O'Connell	UCC	3-04	13	5	2.60
8	Johnny Carroll	Carbery	0-12	12	3	4.00
9	Con Roche	St. Finbarr's	1-08	11	3	3.66
9	Eric Ryan	UCC	0-11	11	5	2.20

In a single game

Rank	Player	Club	Tally	Total	Opposition
1	Eric Philpott	UCC	2-05	11	Nemo Rangers
2	Mick Bambury	Carbery	3-00	9	Macroom
2	Denis McCarthy	Muskerry	2-03	9	Imokilly
4	Jim Barrett	Mitchelstown	1-05	8	St. Finbarr's
5	Tim Healy	Nemo Rangers	1-04	7	Seandún
5	Willie Hanrahan	Avondhu	1-04	7	Na Piarsaigh
5	Con Roche	St. Finbarr's	1-04	7	Avondhu
5	Tim Healy	Nemo Rangers	1-04	7	UCC
5	Con O'Sullivan	Beara	1-04	7	UCC
5	Johnny Carroll	Carbery	0-07	7	Carrigdhoun
