= R130 road (Ireland) =

Road in Ireland

R130 road
- Bóthar R130

Location
- Country: Ireland

Highway system
- Roads in Ireland; Motorways; Primary; Secondary; Regional

The R130 road is a regional road in Fingal, Ireland.

The official description of the R130 from the Roads Act 1993 (Classification of Regional Roads) Order 2012 reads:

R130: Coolquoy Common - Grallagh, County Dublin

Between its junction with R135 at Coolquoy Common in the county of Fingal and its junction with R122 at Grallagh in the county of Fingal via Thorntown in the county of Fingal: Greenoge in the county of Meath: Fieldstown, Palmerstown, Nutstown; Fieldstown — Garristown — Ardcath Road and Grallagh Road at Garristown; and Baldwinstown in the county of Fingal.

== See also ==
- Roads in Ireland
- National primary road
- National secondary road
- Regional road
