= Jerry Lucey =

Irish Gaelic footballer

Personal information
- Native name: Diarmuid Ó Luasaigh (Irish)
- Born: Ballyvourney, County Cork, Ireland
- Height: 6 ft 1 in (185 cm)

Sport
- Sport: Gaelic football
- Position: Corner-back
Club
- Years: Club
- 1960s-1970s: Naomh Abán
Inter-county
Years	County	Apps (scores)
1966-1971	Cork	14 (0-00)
Inter-county titles
- Munster titles: 2
- All-Irelands: 0
- NFL: 0
- All Stars: 0

Jerry Lucey (born 1945 in Ballyvourney, County Cork) is an Irish former sportsperson. He played Gaelic football with his local club Naomh Abán and was a member of the Cork senior inter-county team in the 1960s.
