= 1975 All-Ireland Minor Football Championship =

Gaelic football competition

Championship details

All-Ireland Champions
- Winning team: Kerry (8th win)

All-Ireland Finalists
- Losing team: Tyrone

Provincial Champions
- Munster: Kerry
- Leinster: Kildare
- Ulster: Tyrone
- Connacht: Roscommon

The 1975 All-Ireland Minor Football Championship was the 44th staging of the All-Ireland Minor Football Championship, the Gaelic Athletic Association's premier inter-county Gaelic football tournament for boys under the age of 18.

Cork entered the championship as defending champions, however, they were defeated by Kerry in the Munster final.

On 28 September 1975, Kerry won the championship following a 1–10 to 0–4 defeat of Tyrone in the All-Ireland final. This was their eighth All-Ireland title overall and their first in twelve championship seasons.

== Results ==
=== Connacht Minor Football Championship ===
Quarter-Final

1975 Quarter-Final	Galway	1-13 - 0-09	Sligo	St Jarlath's Park, Tuam

Semi-Finals

1975 Semi-Final	Mayo	1-10 - 0-10	Sligo	Markievicz Park, Sligo

1975 Semi-Final	Roscommon	9-13 - 1-07	Leitrim	Páirc Seán Mac Diarmada, Carrick-on-Shannon

Final

13 July 1975 Final	Roscommon	1-13 - 0-05	Galway	St Jarlath's Park, Tuam

=== Leinster Minor Football Championship ===
Preliminary round

1975 Preliminary round	Carlow	1-12 - 5-14	Wexford	Nowlan Park, Kilkenny

1975 Preliminary round	Kilkenny	2-08 - 2-12	Westmeath	O'Moore Park, Portlaoise

1975 Preliminary round	Laois	1-12 - 1-04	Wexford	O'Connor Park, Tullamore

1975 Preliminary round	Wicklow	1-11 - 0-12	Wexford	Croke Park, Dublin

Quarter-Finals

1975 Quarter-Final	Dublin	1-12 - 0-08	Wexford	Dr Cullen Park, Carlow

1975 Quarter-Final	Laois	3-06 - 1-06	Offaly	O'Connor Park, Tullamore

1975 Quarter-Final	Wicklow	1-05 - 2-18	Meath	Croke Park, Dublin

1975 Quarter-Final	Kildare	5-12 - 2-09	Westmeath	Páirc Tailteann, Navan

Semi-Finals

1975 Semi-Final	Meath	2-08 - 0-08	Dublin	Páirc Tailteann, Navan

1975 Semi-Final	Kildare	2-16 - 2-06	Laois	Croke Park, Dublin

Final

27 July 1975 Final	Kildare	2-09 - 3-05	Meath	Croke Park, Dublin

=== Munster Minor Football Championship ===
Quarter-Finals

1975 Quarter-Final	Tipperary	2-05 - 1-04	Limerick	Emly Sportsfield, Emly

1975 Quarter-Final	Clare	0-19 - 0-02	Waterford	Seán Tracey Park, Tipperary

Semi-Finals

1975 Semi-Final	Kerry	6-23 - 0-05	Tipperary	Ned Hall Park, Clonmel

1975 Semi-Final	Cork	3-16 - 0-08	Clare	Gaelic Grounds, Limerick

Final

13 July 1975 Final	Cork	1-11 - 3-07	Kerry	Fitzgerald Stadium, Killarney

=== Ulster Minor Football Championship ===
Preliminary round

1975 Preliminary round	Armagh	3-05 - 2-05	Fermanagh	St. Molaise Park, Irvinestown

Quarter-Finals

1975 Quarter-Final	Tyrone	3-11 - 0-08	Monaghan	St. Mary's Park, Castleblaney

1975 Quarter-Final	Donegal	1-08 - 3-15	Cavan	MacCumhaill Park, Ballybofey

1975 Quarter-Final	Down	0-10 - 0-09	Antrim	St. Patrick's Park, Newcastle

1975 Quarter-Final	Armagh	4-08 - 1-06	Derry	Healy Park, Omagh

Semi-Finals

1975 Semi-Final	Cavan	0-08 - 1-04	Down	St. Mary's Park, Castleblaney

1975 Semi-Final	Tyrone	1-11 - 2-04	Armagh	O'Neill Park, Dungannon

Final

27 July 1975 Final	Tyrone	0-11 - 0-07	Cavan	St. Tiernach's Park, Clones

=== All-Ireland Minor Football Championship ===
Quarter-Final

3 August 1975 Quarter-Final	Kildare	8-17 - 2-02	Warwickshire	St Conleth's Park, Newbridge

Semi-Finals

10 August 1975 Semi-Final	Kerry	3-12 - 0-06	Roscommon	Croke Park, Dublin

24 August 1975 Semi-Final	Kildare	2-06 - 4-08	Tyrone	Croke Park, Dublin

Final

28 September 1975 Final	Kerry	1-10 - 0-04	Tyrone	Croke Park, Dublin
