= Tony Brennan (Gaelic footballer) =

Irish Gaelic footballer and selector

Personal information
- Native name: Antaine Ó Braonáin (Irish)
- Born: 1944 (age 81–82) Enfield, County Meath, Ireland
- Height: 5 ft 9 in (175 cm)

Sport
- Sport: Gaelic football
- Position: Left wing-forward
Club
- Years: Club
- Enfield
Club titles
- Meath titles: 0
Inter-county*
Years	County	Apps (scores)
1965–1973	Meath	26 (8–87)
Inter-county titles
- Leinster titles: 3
- All-Irelands: 1
- NFL: 0
- *Inter County team apps and scores correct as of 18:54, 19 November 2016.

Anthony Brennan (born 1944) is an Irish former Gaelic football selector and former player. His league and championship career with the senior Meath county team spanned nine seasons from 1965 until 1973.

Brennan first came to prominence on the inter-county scene as a member of the Meath junior team. He impressed in a number of challenge games and made his senior championship debut during the 1965 championship. Over the course of the next nine seasons, Brennan won one All-Ireland medal in 1967, as well as three Leinster medals. He played his last game for Meath in July 1973.

In retirement from playing, Brennan became involved in team management. He served as a selector with the Meath senior team under the management of Seán Boylan and helped steer the team to two All-Ireland titles, five Leinster titles and two National Football League titles in a six-year period.

== Career statistics ==
Team	Season	Connacht		All-Ireland		Total	
Team	Season	Apps	Score	Apps	Score	Apps	Score
Meath	1965	2	0-02	0	0-00	2	0-02
Meath	1966	3	3-04	1	0-00	4	3-04
Meath	1967	3	0-10	2	1-03	5	1-13
Meath	1968	2	0-09	0	0-00	2	0-09
Meath	1969	1	1-06	0	0-00	1	1-06
Meath	1970	3	0-21	2	0-12	10	0-33
Meath	1971	2	2-08	0	0-00	2	2-08
Meath	1972	2	1-04	0	0-00	2	1-04
Meath	1973	3	0-08	0	0-00	3	0-08
Total		21	7-72	5	1-15	26	8-87

== Honours ==
=== Player ===
Enfield

- Meath Junior Football Championship (1): 1964

Meath

- All-Ireland Senior Football Championship (1): 1967
- Leinster Senior Football Championship (3): 1966, 1967, 1970

=== Selector ===
Meath

- All-Ireland Senior Football Championship (2): 1987, 1988
- Leinster Senior Football Championship (5): 1986, 1987, 1988, 1990, 1991
- National Football League (2): 1987-88, 1989-90
