= Mick Burke (Gaelic footballer) =

Irish former sportsperson

Personal information
- Native name: Mícheál de Búrca (Irish)
- Born: 1941 (age 84–85) Mitchelstown, County Cork
- Height: 6 ft 0 in (183 cm)

Sport
- Sport: Gaelic football
- Position: Midfield
Club
- Years: Club
- 1950s-1970s: Mitchelstown
Inter-county
Years	County	Apps (scores)
1961-1969	Cork	19 (1-3)
Inter-county titles
- Munster titles: 2
- All-Irelands: 0
- NFL: 0
- All Stars: 0

Mick Burke (born 1941 in Mitchelstown, County Cork) is an Irish former sportsperson. He played Gaelic football with his local club Mitchelstown and was a member of the Cork senior inter-county team from 1961 until 1969.

During the period between 1963 and 1967, the Cu Chulainn awards predated the GAA Football All Stars in that they picked the team of the year for those years. In 1967 Mick Burke was picked at mid-field on that team.

Honours:

Mitchelstown: North Cork minor Football medal 1959; North Cork Junior Football medals 1958, 1960 & 1961; Cork County Junior Football medal 1961; Cork County Senior Football medal 1961 & Cork County Intermediate Football medal 1965.

Cork: Munster Minor Football medal 1959; Munster Senior Football medals 1966 & 1967; All Ireland runners-up medal 1967.
