= Colie McDonagh =

Irish Gaelic footballer

Personal information
- Native name: Cóilín Mac Donncha (Irish)
- Born: 1945 (age 80–81) Carraroe, County Galway
- Occupation: Teacher
- Height: 5 ft 7 in (170 cm)

Sport
- Sport: Gaelic football
- Position: Right wing-back
Club
- Years: Club
- 1960s-1980s: Fr. Griffin's
Inter-county
- Years: County
- 1960s-1970s: Galway
Inter-county titles
- Connacht titles: 6
- All-Irelands: 3
- NFL: 0
- All Stars: 2

Colie McDonagh (born 1945 in Carraroe, County Galway) is an Irish former sportsperson. He played Gaelic football with his local club Fr. Griffin's and was a member of the Galway senior inter-county team in the 1960s and 1970s.
