= St Ultan's GAA =

Gaelic sports club in County Meath, Ireland

St Ultan's
- Naomh Ultain
- Founded: 1991
- County: Meath
- Colours
- Grounds: Thomas Coogan Park

Playing kits
Standard colours

Senior Club Championships
	All Ireland	Leinster champions	Meath champions
Football:	0	0	0

St Ultan's GAA is a Gaelic Athletic Association club in Bohermeen, County Meath, Ireland. The club is affiliated to the Meath County Board and fields teams primarily in Gaelic football.

== History ==
Located in the parish of Bohermeen, around 7 km from Navan, St Ultan's GAA was founded in 1991.

St Ultan's Men's team made it to the Meath JBFC in their first year of establishment, though were beaten by Trim B. St Ultan's would go on to win the Meath JFC on two occasions: in 2000 against St Peter's Dunboyne B, and in 2006 against Kilmainham. St Ultan's won the Meath IFC two years later in 2008, defeating Cortown to gain access to the senior ranks. St Ultan's stayed up in their first season in the Meath SFC, but were relegated in 2010. They then got relegated from the Meath IFC in 2018, and as of 2026, stay within the Meath JFC.

St Ultan's Ladies team have contested the Meath Ladies SFC 15 finals in their history, only winning four of them. They also contested also three Meath Ladies IFC finals, only winning 1 in 1999. They as of 2026 compete in the Meath Ladies IFC.

== Honours ==
=== Mens Gaelic Football ===
- Meath Intermediate Football Championship (1): 2008
- Meath Junior 'A' Football Championship (2): 2000, 2006
- Meath Junior 'B' Football Championship (0): (runners-up in 1991)

=== Ladies Gaelic Football ===
- Meath Ladies Senior Football Championship (4): 2004, 2010, 2015, 2016 (runners-up in 1994, 1995, 2001, 2002, 2003, 2005, 2006, 2008, 2009, 2013, 2014)
- Meath Ladies Intermediate Football Championship (1): 1999 (runners-up in 2025, 2026)
- Meath Ladies Junior Football Championship (1): 2022

Preceded by Donaghmore/Ashbourne	Meath Intermediate Football Champions; 2008	Succeeded by Oldcastle
