= Ollie Shanley =

Irish Gaelic footballer

Personal information
- Native name: Oilibhéar Mac Seanlaoich (Irish)
- Born: 6 July 1943 (age 83) Cootehill, County Cavan, Ireland
- Occupation: Garda Síochána
- Height: 5 ft 10 in (178 cm)

Sport
- Sport: Gaelic football
- Position: Left corner-forward
Clubs
- Years: Club
- Duleek; Trim; Simonstown Gaels
Club titles
- Meath titles: 0
Inter-county
- Years: County
- Meath
Inter-county titles
- Leinster titles: 4
- All-Irelands: 1
- NFL: 0

John Oliver Shanley (born 1943), known as Ollie Shanley is an Irish former Gaelic footballer who played for a number of clubs, including Trim and Simonstown Gaels, and at inter-county level with the Meath senior football team. He usually lined out as a left corner-forward.

== Honours ==
=== Player ===
Duleek

- Meath Intermediate Football Championship: 1966

Meath

- All-Ireland Senior Football Championship: 1967
- Leinster Senior Football Championship: 1964, 1966, 1967, 1970

=== Coach ===
Meath

- Leinster Minor Football Championship: 1977
