= Ardcath =

Village in County Meath, Ireland

Ardcath Ard Cath
- Village
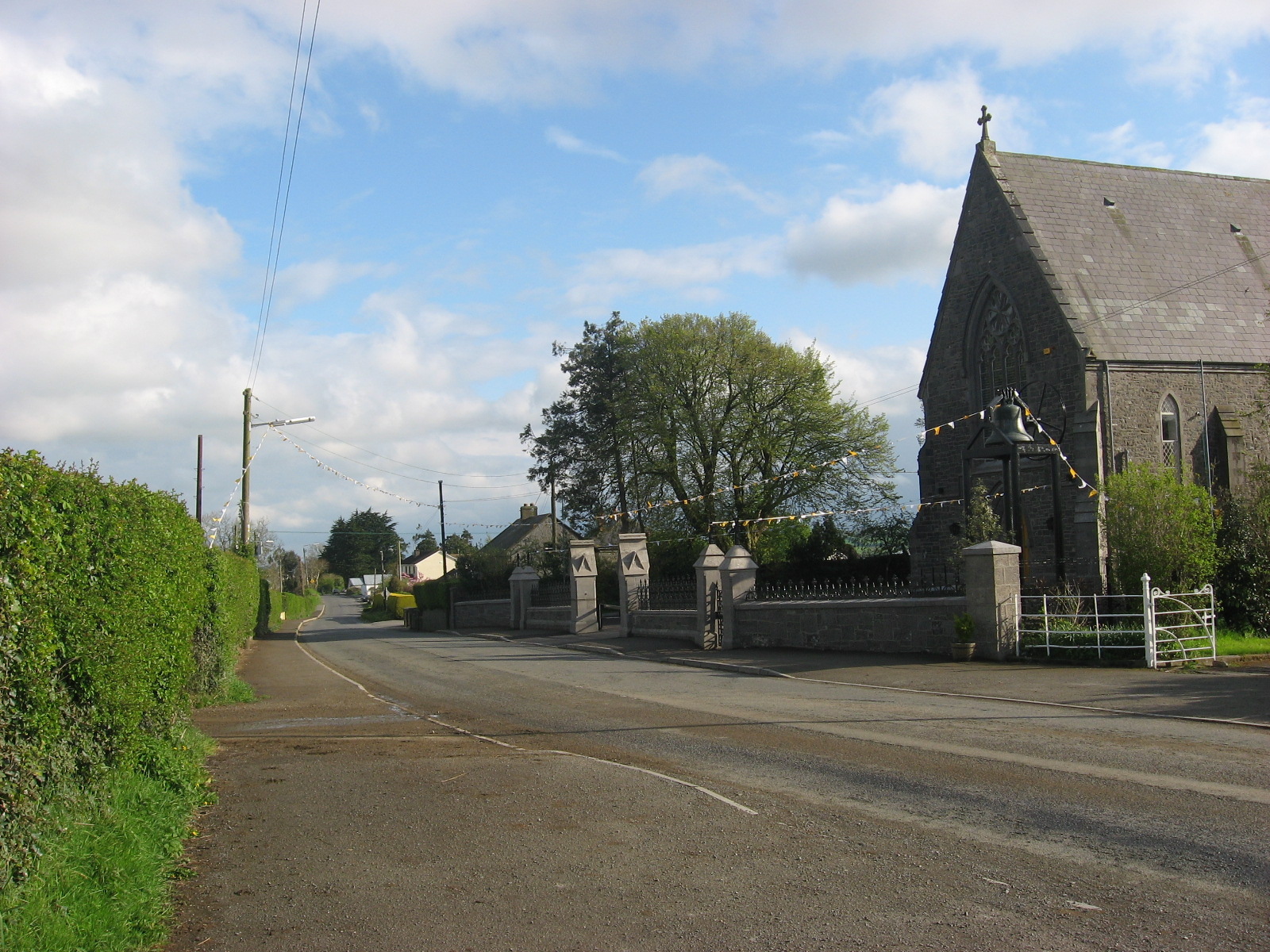
- Church Road, Ardcath, County Meath

- Location in Ireland
- Coordinates: 53°36′29″N 6°23′35″W
- Country: Ireland
- Province: Leinster
- County: County Meath

Area
  - Total: 43.42 km^{2} (16.76 sq mi)
- Elevation: 70 m (230 ft)
- Time zone: UTC+0 (WET)
  - Summer (DST): UTC-1 (IST (WEST))
- Irish Grid Reference: O082608

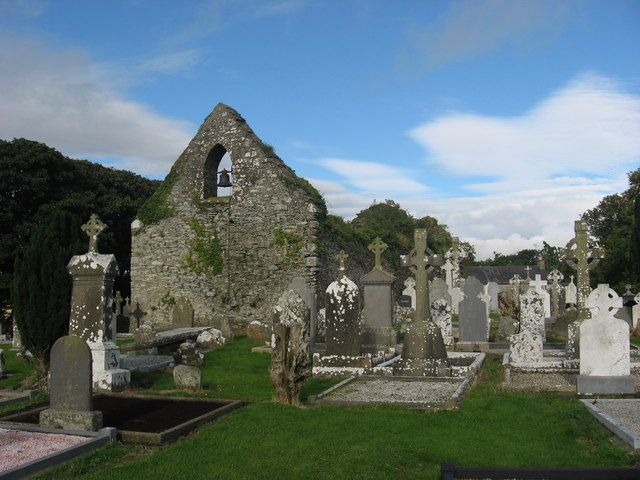
Church and graveyard in Ardcath

Ardcath (Irish: Ard Cath, meaning 'height of the battle') is a small village in County Meath, Ireland. The surrounding villages include Garristown, Clonalvy, Duleek, Battramstown, Bellewstown and Stamullen. Ardcath is 12 km south of Drogheda and 31 km north of Dublin city centre.

== History ==
Ardcath means "height of the battle" in Irish, and refers to a battle (recorded in the Book of Howth) fought in Bardic history between the Kings of Ireland, and Fionn McCool and the Fianna. The Kings gathered on the hill of Garristown and the Fianna on the hill of Ardcath.

Four Knocks (Irish: Na Fuarchnoic, meaning 'Cold Hills') is a passage tomb near Ardcath that was built around 5000 years ago. The graves are decorated and show the first artistic depiction of a human face in Ireland.

Ardcath is historically part of the barony of Upper Duleek. In the early 19th century half of the parish was being cultivated (principally with wheat) while the other half was pasture land. Cotton was weaved in the area for Dublin and Drogheda manufacturers.

There are extensive ruins of a medieval church, surrounded by a cemetery that is still in use.

Ardcath's church was dedicated to St Mary the Blessed Virgin as was a tradition of the Norman settlement with the tithe of the Church and Parish being directed to the Canons of Llananthony (prima and secunda) Wales from 1172 to 1541. The church also had an active 'confraternity' which was a body corporate dedicated to maintaining religious services within the Church. Such organisations were often established by Charter and survived the Reformation. There was a similar organisation at the Church in the then adjoining parish of Piercetown.

== Community ==
There are several community groups in the area such as the Ardcath Macra and a guild of the Irish Countrywomen's Association. These have been around since 1952 and 1948 respectively, and include members from surrounding towns.

Ardcath has a local school that was built in 1950 and is currently attended by around 100 students. Prior to this the school was in the old Ardcath Penal Day Church building when it stopped being used in 1862.

Every year there is a large festival organised by the Ardcath Parish Committee. The festival runs the course of a week in summer and every second year the Rose of Ardcath is contested in a local pub. The building was originally built in 1859. The building is used for religious worship and is a single storey detached building. It was built because of the deteriorating condition of the old church built in 1690. The church cost 2600 pounds. It suffered storm damage on several occasions. In 1903 the sacristy roof was stripped and the nave damaged. The roof was stripped and re-slated in 1992. The building is gothic in style. In 1955, extensive renovation work was carried out on the church. The walls and floors were repaired and a sacred heart altar with marble rails was erected.

== Transport ==
The roads in Ardcath are all local roads - though there are some regional roads close by such as the R130 in Garristown. Safety concerns over the state of some of the roads around Ardcath have been raised at the meeting of the Slane Electoral Area Committee of Meath County Council, including concerns relating to inadequate signage notifying drivers on the approach to the local school.

== See also ==
- List of towns and villages in the Republic of Ireland
