= Mick White (Gaelic footballer) =

Irish Gaelic footballer

Personal information
- Native name: Mícheál de Faoite (Irish)
- Born: 1941 (age 84–85) Rathkenny, County Meath, Ireland
- Occupation: Sales rep
- Height: 5 ft 9 in (175 cm)

Sport
- Sport: Gaelic football
- Position: Right corner-back
Club
- Years: Club
- Rathkenny
Club titles
- Meath titles: 0
Inter-county
- Years: County
- Meath
Inter-county titles
- Leinster titles: 3
- All-Irelands: 1
- NFL: 0

Michael White (born 1941) is an Irish former Gaelic footballer who played for club side Rathkenny and at inter-county level with the Meath senior football team. He usually lined out as a right corner-back.

== Honours ==
Meath

- All-Ireland Senior Football Championship: 1967
- Leinster Senior Football Championship: 1964, 1966, 1967, 1970
- All-Ireland Junior Football Championship: 1962
- Leinster Junior Football Championship: 1962
