= 1955 All-Ireland Minor Football Championship =

Gaelic football competition

All-Ireland Champions
- Winning team: Dublin (4th win)

All-Ireland Finalists
- Losing team: Tipperary

Provincial Champions
- Munster: Tipperary
- Leinster: Dublin
- Ulster: Antrim
- Connacht: Mayo

The 1955 All-Ireland Minor Football Championship was the 24th staging of the All-Ireland Minor Football Championship, the Gaelic Athletic Association's premier inter-county Gaelic football tournament for boys under the age of 18.

Dublin entered the championship as defending champions.

On 25 September 1955, Dublin won the championship following a 4-4 to 2-7 defeat of Tipperary in the All-Ireland final. This was their fourth All-Ireland title overall and their second in succession.

== Results ==
=== Connacht Minor Football Championship ===
Quarter-Final

Galway 3-3 Roscommon 1-3.

Semi-Finals

Mayo 3-4 Sligo 1-4.

Galway 7-11 1-3.

Final

Mayo 2-5 Galway 1-5 Tuam.

=== All-Ireland Minor Football Championship ===
Semi-Finals

Tipperary 1-11 Mayo 1-2 Limerick

Final

25 September 1955 Final	Dublin	4-04 - 2-07	Tipperary	Croke Park, Dublin
