= Father Griffins GAA =

Gaelic football club in County Galway, Ireland

Father Griffins
- An t-Athair Ó Gríofa
- Founded: 1948
- County: Galway
- Colours: White, Maroon and Black
- Grounds: Crestwood, Headford Rd. South Park, The Claddagh
- Coordinates: 53°15′57.80″N 9°03′14.88″W

Playing kits
Standard colours

Senior Club Championships
	All Ireland	Connacht champions	Galway champions
Football:	-	2	7

Father Griffins is a Gaelic football club based in Galway, Ireland. It is a member of the Galway branch of the Gaelic Athletic Association (GAA). The club is solely concerned with football.

From its founding in 1948 until its final county title in 1975, and before amalgamating with Éire Óg, Father Griffins achieved several success in Galway. The club won the Connacht Senior Club Football Championship twice, falling at the semi-final stage of the All-Ireland Senior Club Football Championship on both occasions.

== History ==
=== Early foundations ===
On 14 February 1948 the following item appeared in the (now defunct) Galway Observer:

“A very enthusiastic meeting of Gaels was held recently at the C.Y.M.S. Hall, Galway for the purpose of forming a football club in the city. After a lengthy discussion the plans were made for the formation of the club, which will be known as the Fr Griffin G.F.C. Many meetings have taken place and it has been decided to affiliate a senior and a junior team in the current year’s championship. If there are any interested and wish to become members of the club they should contact any member of the committee or write to the Hon. Secretary. Great strides have been taken to ensure success and so far the seeds of a good senior team have been laid. The following have been appointed –

Chairman: John Daly

Vice-Chairman: Stephen Lally

Secretary: Sean Kindillon “Gracedieu”

Treasurer: Jimmy Ward

Committee: Austin Roache, JJ Walsh, Paddy Fitzmaurice, Tom Brady.

Mick Lynch and Willie Naughton have been appointed board Delegates.

=== Club name ===
The clubs was named after Fr. Michael Griffin. Born in Gurteen, Ballinasloe, he was ordained at Maynooth in 1917 and was transferred from Ennistymon, Co Clare to the parish of Rahoon in Galway City in June 1918.

At the age of 28 he was lured to his death by the British Forces on the night of 14 November 1920. On Saturday 20 November his body was found in a bog near Barna. He had been shot through the head. The following Tuesday morning after solemn requiem mass the start of the funeral journey took place through the streets of Galway. It was one of the largest ever seen with 3 bishops, 150 priests and in excess of 12,000 mourners participating, as the city he loved paid its last farewell to the dead priest.

When a group of enthusiasts gathered together in Galway in the spring of 1948 to form a football club they unanimously agreed to call that club Fr Griffins.

=== Achievements ===
That was the first public announcement of the formation of the Fr Griffins Gaelic Football Club. Nobody at that time, not even the founders of the club, realised that one of the city's greatest ever Gaelic Football Clubs had come into being. Griifins are the only city club to win three senior championships in a row, to have won the senior football title on seven occasions, the only city club to win the Connacht Championship on two occasions. Fr Griffins have also won the Senior League and County Championships at juvenile, minor and under twenty-one levels.

=== Notable players ===
All-Ireland Senior Football Medal Winners

- 1964 - Johnny Geraghty, Martin Newell, Tom Sands, Kieran O’Connor
- 1965 - Johnny Geraghty, Martin Newell, Tom Sands
- 1966 - Johnny Geraghty, Martin Newell, Colie McDonagh, Liam Sammon, Tom Sands

All-Star Awards

- 1971 - Liam Sammon
- 1973 - Liam Sammon

=== Club amalgamation ===
In 2007, two Galway city Gaelic football clubs announced that they were amalgamating for a trial period of two years. Éire Óg and Fr. Griffins announced that they would jointly enter all city and county competitions at all age levels including juvenile and adult football. The move came after weeks of discussions involving both clubs and the Galway County Board.

The Éire Óg club caters for players in the Headford Road, Castlelawn, Tirellan, Ballinfoyle, Menlo and Castlegar areas. Fr. Griffins caters for players in the College Road, Lough Atalia, Forster Street, the City Centre, Bohermore, Woodquay, Claddagh, Riverside, Glenburren and Tuam Road areas. The proposed new/amalgamated club would cater for players from all of these areas.

The amalgamation was brought about because of the declining demographics (including in children under the age of 14) in the city centre area. Over time this would affect the ability of each club to field teams at a number of age levels.

== Honours ==
- Galway Senior Football Championship: 7
  - 1948, 1949, 1950, 1967, 1970, 1972, 1975
- Connacht Senior Club Football Championship: 2
  - 1970, 1972
