= Mick O'Loughlin (Gaelic footballer) =

Irish Gaelic footballer

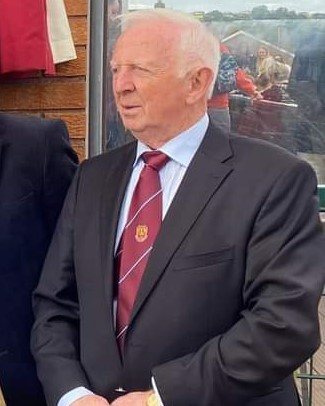
- O'Loughlin at Bishopstown GAA Club in 2022

Personal information
- Native name: Mícheál Ó Lochlainn (Irish)
- Born: 1-1-1945 Kanturk, County Cork
- Height: 5 ft 9 in (175 cm)

Sport
- Sport: Gaelic football
- Position: Centre-forward
Club
- Years: Club
- 1950-60s: Kanturk Bishopstown GAA
Inter-county
Years	County	Apps (scores)
1966-1969	Cork	10 (3-2)
Inter-county titles
- Munster titles: 2
- All-Irelands: 0
- NFL: 0
- All Stars: 0

Mick O'Loughlin (born 1945 in Kanturk, County Cork) is an Irish former sportsperson. He played Gaelic football with his local club Kanturk and later Bishopstown GAA and was a member of the Cork senior inter-county team from 1960 until 1969.

== Early life and club career ==
Mick O’Loughlin began his playing career with Kanturk GAA in the 1950s, lining out in both hurling and football, often alongside his brothers Charlie and Bryan. He was part of the early years of a golden era for Kanturk, contributing to the team that went on to claim a record five Duhallow Junior Hurling Championships in a row from 1965 to 1969.

At club level, he also played football with St. Michael’s, and won a Cork senior hurling county medal with Blackrock. He later joined Bishopstown GAA, where he played in both codes and was part of the intermediate football championship–winning side in 1974, the victory that secured the club senior football status for the first time. He also had a spell with Buttevant GAA, where he served as player-manager in the late 1970s.

Much of O’Loughlin’s movement between clubs reflected his postings with An Garda Síochána, as he served in different parts of Cork and beyond over a 40-year career.

== Inter-county career ==
=== Cork ===
O’Loughlin represented Cork at every level:

- Minor football: first appeared in 1963.
- Under-21 football: between 1964 and 1966 he won a Munster medal and was part of the team that reached an All-Ireland final.
- Junior football: won both Munster and All-Ireland titles in 1964.
- Senior football: played from 1965 to 1969, winning Munster senior titles in 1966 and 1967, and lining out in the 1967 All-Ireland Senior Football Championship Final against Meath, scoring a point.

He was ranked #10 on the shortlist for Footballer of the Year in 1967.

- Intermediate hurling: represented Cork in a competitive era of inter-county hurling.

=== Munster ===
O’Loughlin was selected on the Munster side for the prestigious Railway Cup in 1968.

=== Garda ===
As a member of An Garda Síochána, O’Loughlin played for Cork Garda divisional teams in both hurling and football. He was a regular in the All-Ireland Garda vs Army clashes, winning two football titles and one hurling title. In 1967, he captained the national Garda football team to victory in Croke Park.

== Management career ==
After retiring as a player, O’Loughlin managed and coached at club and county level:

- Buttevant: player-manager (1975–79).
- Bishopstown: underage to senior (1981–94).
- Killeagh: coach in 1984.
- Cork minors: selector in 1989, 1990, in 1993 when Bishopstown’s Brian Cuthbert captained Cork to the All-Ireland title, and winners again in 2020.
- Cork seniors: selector (2001–03) under Larry Tompkins, and re-appointed in 2007 with Teddy McCarthy under manager Teddy Holland.
- Cork under-21s: part of the management team (2005–07) with John Cleary, winning the All-Ireland title in 2007.

== Service ==
O’Loughlin also contributed off the field as Irish Officer of the Cork County Board between 1988 and 1990. Since 2020 he has served as President of Bishopstown GAA, remaining an active member of the club’s management committee. In recognition of his service, Bishopstown hosts the annual Frankie and Micko Over-35s Football Cup, featuring teams from Douglas, Nemo Rangers, and Na Piarsaigh.
