= Clonalvy =

Clonalvy Cluain Ailbhe
- Civil parish
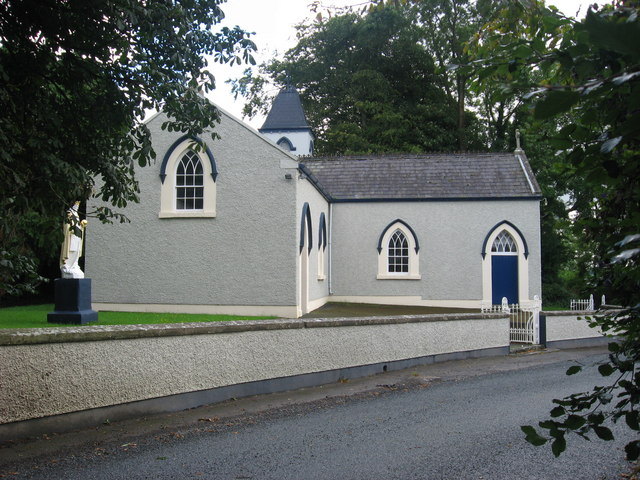
- Clonalvy's Roman Catholic church is dedicated to St John the Baptist

- Location within Ireland
- Coordinates: 53.5874°N 6.3396°W
- Country: Ireland
- Province: Leinster
- County: County Meath

Clonalvy (Irish: Cluain Ailbhe) is a civil parish in County Meath, Ireland. The name Clonalvy is derived from the Irish language cluain (or clon) meaning 'meadow' and Áilbhe (or Áilbhe) referring to a person or place. It is taken to mean Ailbhe's Meadow but could also refer to the Meadow of the Ailbine River (now Delvin River). There are several variations of the spelling of Clonalvy, including Clonolvy, Clonalvey, Cluain Ailbhe.

According to the Placenames Database of Ireland, Clonalvy is "just beside Fourknocks, seems a most likely location for the famous Lia Ailbhe, the standing stone described in AN as 'the chief monument of Brega' (príomh-dindgnai Maighi Bregh) in 999, when it fell and was made into four millstones by Máelaschlainn the high king".

Clonalvy's church was dedicated to St John the Baptist with its feast day falling on 24 June. This followed the practice of the Norman settlement, moving the church from the traditional Celtic system. The tithe of the Church and Parish being directed to the Canons of Llananthony (prima and secunda) Wales from 1172 to 1541. The Norman church now lies in ruins in the townland of Flemingtown.

The area has a small school, a pub and a shop.
