= Pat Collier =

Irish Gaelic footballer

Personal information
- Native name: Pádraig Coiléir (Irish)
- Born: Stamullen, County Meath, Ireland

Sport
- Sport: Gaelic football
- Position: Right half back
Club
- Years: Club
- Stamullen
Inter-county
- Years: County
- ?-?: Meath
Inter-county titles
- Leinster titles: 3
- All-Irelands: 1
- All Stars: N/A

Pat 'Red' Collier played Gaelic football at senior level for the Meath county team in the 1960s. He won 1 All-Ireland title with Meath in 1967. He played club football for Stamullen. He first played for Meath in the Right Full back position but he is best remembered as an attacking and determined Right half back.
