= Peter Moore (Gaelic footballer) =

Irish Gaelic footballer

Personal information
- Native name: Peadar Ó Mordha (Irish)
- Born: Ballinabrackey, County Meath
- Occupation: Bord na Móna employee
- Height: 6 ft 1 in (185 cm)

Sport
- Sport: Gaelic football
- Position: Midfield
Club
- Years: Club
- 1950s–1970s: Ballinabrackey
Inter-county
- Years: County
- 1959–1970: Meath
Inter-county titles
- Leinster titles: 4
- All-Irelands: 1
- NFL: 0
- All Stars: 0

Peter Moore (1940–2010) was an Irish sportsperson. He played Gaelic football for his local club Ballinabrackey and was a senior member of the Meath county team from 1959 until 1970.
