= Patrick Reynolds (Gaelic footballer) =

Irish Gaelic footballer

Pat Reynolds
Personal information
- Native name: Pádraig Mac Ránaill (Irish)
- Born: Walterstown, County Meath, Ireland

Sport
- Sport: Gaelic football
- Position: Half back
Club
- Years: Club
- Walterstown
Inter-county
- Years: County
- ?–?: Meath
Inter-county titles
- Leinster titles: 4
- All-Irelands: 1
- All Stars: 1

Pat Reynolds is an Irish former Gaelic footballer who played for the Meath county team. He had much success playing inter-county football in the 1960s on the Meath team. He usually played as a halfback. He also played club football for Walterstown. During his playing career he won one Senior All-Ireland medal (1967). When Reynolds played for Meath, they were a very strong team, but Galway beat them in 1964 and 1966. Reynolds continued to play for Meath into the 70s. He played in the first eighty-minute All-Ireland final against Kerry in 1970.

He was picked for the left halfback position in 1971, the first year of the All Star Awards, making him Meath's first all star and the only one that season.

Pat was a selector on the Meath team when Seán Boylan was in charge during the 1980s and early 1990s, and during this time Meath won two All-Ireland titles.

His son Paddy won two All-Ireland medals with Meath and one All Star.

Pat is a potato farmer in Garlow Cross in Co Meath supplying among others the Tayto brand. His son Paddy also is involved with the business.
