= Eric Philpott =

Irish Gaelic footballer

Personal information
- Native name: Eiric Mac Philib (Irish)
- Born: 1946 The Lough, Cork, Ireland
- Died: 25 December 2015 (aged 69) Curraheen, Cork, Ireland
- Occupation: Secondary school teacher
- Height: 5 ft 10 in (178 cm)

Sport
- Sport: Gaelic football
- Position: Right wing-forward
Clubs
- Years: Club
- St Finbarr's; Bandon
College
- Years: College
- University College Cork
College titles
- Sigerson titles: 1
Inter-county
Years	County	Apps (scores)
1965-1969	Cork	11 (1-14)
Inter-county titles
- Munster titles: 2
- All-Irelands: 0
- NFL: 0
- All Stars: 0

Eric Philpott (1946 – 25 December 2015) was an Irish Gaelic footballer who played as a right wing-forward at senior level for the Cork county team.

Born in the Lough, Cork, Philpott arrived on the inter-county scene at the age of sixteen when he first linked up with the Cork minor team, before later joining the under-21 side. He made his senior debut during the 1965 championship. Philpott went on to play a key role over the next few years and won two Munster medals. He was an All-Ireland runner-up on one occasion.

At club level Philpott played with both St Finbarr's and Bandon.

Throughout his inter-county career, Philpott made 11 championship appearances for Cork. His retirement came following the conclusion of the 1969 championship.
