= 1967 All-Ireland Senior Football Championship =

Football championship

Championship details
- Dates: 23 April – 24 September 1967
- Teams: 31

All-Ireland Champions
- Winning team: Meath (3rd win)
- Captain: Peter Darby
- Manager: Patrick Tully; Peter McDermott

All-Ireland Finalists
- Losing team: Cork
- Captain: Denis Coughlan
- Manager: Donie O'Donovan

Provincial Champions
- Munster: Cork
- Leinster: Meath
- Ulster: Cavan
- Connacht: Mayo

Championship statistics
- No. matches played: 32
- Top Scorer: Charlie Gallagher (0–27)
- Player of the Year: Bertie Cunningham

The 1967 All-Ireland Senior Football Championship was the 81st staging of the All-Ireland Senior Football Championship, the Gaelic Athletic Association's premier inter-county Gaelic football tournament. The championship began on 23 April 1967 and ended on 24 September 1967.

Galway entered the championship as the defending champions, however, they were defeated by Mayo in the Connacht semi-final.

On 24 September 1967, Meath won the championship following a 1–9 to 0–9 defeat of Cork in the All-Ireland final. This was their third All-Ireland title and their first in thirteen championship seasons.

Cavan's Charlie Gallagher was the championship's top scorer with 1–25. Meath's Bertie Cunningham was the choice for Texaco Footballer of the Year.

== Leinster Championship format change ==
Second round returns to Leinster this year.

== Results ==
=== Connacht Senior Football Championship ===
Quarter-final

28 May 1967 Quarter-final	Sligo	1–7 – 3–6	Mayo	Markievicz Park, Sligo
	D McHugh 1–1, M Kearins 0–4, M Kenny 0–1, M Marren 0–1.		M Connaughton 1–0, J Nallen 1–0, J Farragher 1–0, J Langan 0–2, S O'Dowd 0–1, J Corcoran 0–1, MJ Ruddy 0–1, M Ruane 0–1.

Semi-finals

11 June 1967 Semi-final	Roscommon	2–6 – 2–8	Leitrim	St. Coman's Park, Roscommon
	J Kelly 2–0, T White 0–3, J Keane 0–2, J Keane 0–1.		P Dolan 1–1, C McGowan 1–0, M Keane 0–3, B Rynn 0–2, P McGarty 0–1, K McGowan 0–1.

25 June 1967 Semi-final	Galway	1–8 – 3–13	Mayo	Pearse Stadium, Galway
	M McDonagh 1–0, C Dunne 0–3, J Keenan 0–2, J Glynn 0–1, P Donnellan 0–1, F Canavan 0–1.		S O'Dowd 1–3, J Farragher 1–2, M Ruane 1–1, J Corcoran 0–4, J Morley 0–1, J Langan 0–1, J Nallen 0–1.	Referee: J Hatton (Wicklow)

Final

16 July 1967 Final	Mayo	4–15 – 0–7	Leitrim	Tuam Stadium, Tuam
	M Ruane 2–1, J Corcoran 0–6, W Loftus 1–2, J Langan 0–4, S O'Dowd 1–0, J Farragher 0–1, PJ Loftus 0–1.		M Keane 0–4, P Dolan 0–2, P McGowan 0–1.	Referee: J Hatton (Wicklow)

=== Leinster Senior Football Championship ===
First round

23 April 1967 First round	Wicklow	0–10 – 0–8	Wexford	Aughrim County Ground, Aughrim
	M McNamee 0–3, P Clarke 0–3, T Scott 0–1, A Norton 0–1, J Coates 0–1, T Humphries 0–1.		J Berry 0–6, P Wilson 0–1, T Miller 0–1.

14 May 1967 First round	Laois	3–8 – 3–6	Carlow	Geraldine Park, Athy
	F Walsh 0–6, R Miller 1–1, J Maher 1–0, JJ Conway 1–0, P Delaney 0–1.		B Hayden 1–6, M Nolan 1–0, P McNally 1–0.	Referee: J Hatton (Wicklow)

Second round

28 May 1967 Second round	Wicklow	0–11 – 0–8	Laois	Dr. Cullen Park, Carlow
	T Scott 0–3, L Kelly 0–3, P Clarke 0–2, L Norton 0–1, W Cuffe 0–1, T Norton 0–1.		JJ Conway 0–4, P Delaney 0–2, F Walsh 0–1, D Miller 0–1.

Quarter-finals

21 May 1967 Quarter-final	Longford	1–7 – 0–10	Kildare	Croke Park, Dublin
	J Hanniffy 0–4, S Donnelly 1–0, S Murray 0–2, T Mulvihill 0–1.		P Dunny 0–4, J Donnelly 0–3, T Keogh 0–1, M Mullins 0–1, K Kelly 0–1.	Referee: P Kelly (Dublin)

21 May 1967 Quarter-final	Meath	2–9 – 0–3	Louth	Croke Park, Dublin
	N Curran 2–5, T Brennan 0–2, P Collier 0–1, P Moore 0–1.		B Gaughan 0–3.	Referee: J Hatton (Wicklow)

11 June 1967 Quarter-final	Westmeath	1–6 – 0–8	Dublin	O'Connor Park, Tullamore
	T Dolan 1–0, P Buckley 0–3, V Murray 0–2, J McKenna 0–1.		J Keaveney 0–6, T Donnelly 0–1, S O'Connor 0–1.	Referee: J Hatton (Wicklow)

18 June 1967 Quarter-final	Offaly	0–13 – 0–7	Wicklow	Croke Park, Dublin
	T McTeague 0–8, J Malone 0–2, R Scully 0–2, J Evans 0–1.		T Scott 0–3, P Clarke 0–1, W Norton 0–1, W Kelly 0–1, M McNamee 0–1.	Attendance: 25,183; Referee: C Kenworthy (Dublin)

18 June 1967 Quarter-final replay	Longford	3–12 – 2–10	Kildare	Croke Park, Dublin
	J Devine 1–4, S Donnelly 2–0, J Hanniffy 0–5, T Mulvihill 0–1, M Hopkins 0–1, J Murray 0–1.		P Dunny 1–2, T Carew 1–1, J Donnelly 0–4, Pa Connolly 0–2, M Mullins 0–1.	Attendance: 25,183; Referee: P Kelly (Dublin)

Semi-finals

2 July 1967 Semi-final	Longford	1–7 – 0–13	Offaly	Croke Park, Dublin
	J Hanniffy 0–6, S Donnelly 1–0, T Mulvihill 0–1.		T McTeague 0–5, E Scully 0–3, G Hughes 0–3, J Malone 0–1, T Green 0–1.	Attendance: 18,777; Referee: P Kelly (Dublin)

9 July 1967 Semi-final	Meath	0–12 – 0–6	Westmeath	O'Connor Park, Tullamore
	T Brennan 0–4, M Kerrigan 0–4, M O'Brien 0–1, N Curran 0–1, O Shanley 0–1, P Bruton 0–1.		P Buckley 0–2, J McKenna 0–1, T Dolan 0–1, M Carley 0–1.	Attendance: 25,000; Referee: J Hatton (Wicklow)

Final

23 July 1967 Final	Meath	0–8 – 0–6	Offaly	Croke Park, Dublin
	Tony Brennan 0–4 (0-3f), Mick Mellett 0–2 (0-1f), Noel Curran and Ollie Shanley 0–1 each		Greg Hughes and Tony McTague (0-2f) 0–2 each, Ambrose Hickey and Sean Evans 0–1 each	Attendance: 40,461; Referee: Jim Shannon (Dublin)

=== Munster Senior Football Championship ===
Quarter-finals

21 May 1967 Quarter-final	Clare	0–9 – 0–2	Waterford	Hennessy Memorial Park, Miltown Malbay
	M Haugh 0–2, M Begley 0–2, P McMahon 0–2, J Tubridy 0–1, M Chambers 0–1, P O'Grady 0–1.		T Gough 0–2.	Referee: J O'Connor (Kerry)

21 May 1967 Quarter-final	Limerick	4–10 – 2–5	Tipperary	Gaelic Grounds, Limerick
	M Tynan 2–5, M Ranahan 1–1, P Murpjy 1–0, D Sheehan 0–2, D Quirke 0–1, D Sheehan 0–1.		T Burke 2–4, L Vaughan 0–1.	Referee: F Halbert (Cork)

Semi-finals

18 June 1967 Semi-final	Cork	1–13 – 1–6	Clare	Cork Athletic Grounds, Cork
	JJ Murphy 1–1, C o'Sullivan 0–4, J Carroll 0–3, E Philpott 0–2, D Coughlan 0–2, E McCarthy 0–1.		M McInerney 0–5, M Moloney 1–0, J Tubridy 0–1.	Attendance: 5,000; Referee: J Moloney (Tipperary)

18 June 1967 Semi-final	Kerry	1–17 – 1–8	Limerick	Austin Stack Park, Tralee
	J O'Shea 0–7, T Kelliher 0–5, DJ Crowley 1–0, J Saunders 0–3, J O'Connor 0–2.		M Tynan 1–7, T Sheehan 0–1.	Referee: T Moloney (Tipperary)

Final

16 July 1967 Final	Cork	0–8 – 0–7	Kerry	Cork Athletic Grounds, Cork
	E Philpott 0–2, É Ryan 0–2, B O'Neill 0–2, C O'Sullivan 0–1, J Carroll 0–1.		J O'Shea 0–3, P Griffin 0–2, DJ Crowley 0–1, T Sheehan 0–1.	Attendance: 15,000; Referee: J Martin (Tyrone)

=== Ulster Senior Football Championship ===
Preliminary round

11 June 1967 Preliminary round	Tyrone	0–13 – 3–2	Fermanagh	St. Molaise Park, Irvinestown

Quarter-finals

4 June 1967 Quarter-final	Armagh	1–8 – 2–13	Donegal	Athletic Grounds, Armagh
	L O'Rourke 1–0, A Patterson 0–2, E Casey 0–2, T McCReesh 0–2, D Kelly 0–1, J Whan 0–1.		P McShea 1–5, N Gallagher 1–3, S Granaghan 0–3, PJ Flood 0–2.	Referee: J Lynn (Derry)

11 June 1967 Quarter-final	Down	3–9 – 1–10	Derry	Páirc Esler, Newry

18 June 1967 Quarter-final	Antrim	2–8 – 2–12	Cavan	Casement Park, Belfast
	J Murray 0–7, P Lynn 1–0, A SLoan 1–0, W Carson 0–1.		C Gallagher 0–8, P Murray 1–1, M Greenan 1–0, S Duggan 0–2, J O'Reilly 0–1.	Referee: M Mahon (Fermanagh)

25 June 1967 Quarter-final	Tyrone	1–13 – 1–7	Monaghan	O'Neill Park, Dungannon
	C O'Neill 1–2, P Harte 0–4, P King 0–2, S McIlhatton 0–1, P Mulgrew 0–1, S Taggarty 0–1, P Forbes 0–1, J O'Neill 0–1.		T McCudden 1–3, G Fitzpatrick 0–2, B Connolly 0–2.

Semi-finals

2 July 1967 Semi-final	Down	2–8 – 2–5	Donegal	St. Tiernach's Park, Clones
	S O'Neill 1–2, D McCartan 1–0, G Glynn 0–3, C McAlaraney 0–2, J McCartan 0–1.		S Granaghan 1–1, D O'Carroll 1–0, N Gallagher 0–2, M Griffin 0–1, J Quigley 0–1.	Referee: J Martin (Tyrone)

9 July 1967 Semi-final	Tyrone	3–3 – 1–13	Cavan	St. Molaise Park, Irvinestown
	P Harte 1–1, N Timlin 1–0, C McIlduff 1–0, S O'Brien 0–1, S McElhatton 0–1.		C Gallagher 0–5, JJ O'Reilly 1–0, S Duggan 0–3, P Murray 0–3, J O'Donnell 0–1, T Lynch 0–1.	Referee: M Mahon (Fermanagh)

Final

23 July 1967 Final	Cavan	2–12 – 0–8	Down	St. Tiernach's Park, Clones
	C Gallagher 0–6, JJ O'Reilly 1–1, M Greenan 1–0, S Duggan 0–2, J O'Donnell 0–2, P Murray 0–1.		S O'Neill 0–6, J Murphy 0–1, L Powell 0–1.	Attendance: 30,000; Referee: J Hatton (Wicklow)

=== All-Ireland Senior Football Championship ===
Semi-finals

6 August 1967 Semi-final	Cork	2–7 – 0–12	Cavan	Croke Park, Dublin
	F Hayes 1–1, C O'Sullivan 0–4, D Coughlan 1–0, J Carroll 0–1, B O'Neill 0–1.		C Gallagher 0–8, P Murray 0–2, T Lynch 0–1, J O'Donnell 0–1.	Attendance: 28,370

20 August 1967 Semi-final	Meath	3–14 – 1–14	Mayo	Croke Park, Dublin
	T Brennan 1–2, P Mulvanney 0–4, P Collier 1–0, P Moore 1–0, M Kerrigan 0–3, M Mellett 0–2, N Curran 0–2, O Shanley 0–1.		J Corcoran 0–8, J Nealon 1–1, J Farragher 0–1, W Loftus 0–1, S O'Dowd 0–1, M Ruane 0–1, J Gibbons 0–1.	Attendance: 42,958; Referee: J Moloney (Tipperary)

Final

24 September 1967 Final	Meath	1–9 – 0–9	Cork	Croke Park, Dublin
	T Kearns 1–2, P Mulvanney 0–2, M Mellett 0–2, N Curran 0–2, T Brennan 0–1.		C O'Sullivan 0–3, E Philpott 0–3, B O'Neill 0–1, F Hayes 0–1, M O'Loughlin 0–1.	Attendance: 70,343; Referee: J Moloney (Tipperary)

== Championship statistics ==
=== Miscellaneous ===
- The Limerick vs Tipperary game was the first meeting between the teams since 1952. The match gave Limerick a first win over Tipperary since 1896.
- Mayo won the Connacht championship for the first time since 1955.
- The All Ireland final was the first championship meeting between Meath and Cork.

=== Top scorers ===
Overall

Rank	Player	County	Tally	Total	Matches	Average
1	Charlie Gallagher	Cavan	0–27	27	4	6.75
2	Mick Tynan	Limerick	3–12	21	2	10.50
3	Joe Corcoran	Mayo	0–19	19	4	4.75
4	Noel Curran	Meath	2–11	17	5	3.40
5	Tony Brennan	Meath	1–13	16	5	3.20

Single game

Rank	Player	County	Tally	Total	Opposition
1	Noel Curran	Meath	2–5	11	Louth
1	Mick Tynan	Limerick	2–5	11	Tipperary
3	Tony Burke	Tipperary	2–4	10	Limerick
3	Mick Tynan	Limerick	1–7	10	Kerry
5	Brenan Hayden	Carlow	1–6	9	Laois
6	Pauric McShea	Donegal	1–5	8	Armagh
6	Charlie Gallagher	Cavan	0–8	8	Antrim
6	Charlie Gallagher	Cavan	0–8	8	Cork
6	Joe Corcoran	Mayo	0–8	8	Meath
6	Tony McTague	Offaly	0–8	8	Wicklow
