= 1966 All-Ireland Senior Football Championship =

Football championship

Championship details
- Dates: 1 May – 25 September 1966
- Teams: 31

All-Ireland Champions
- Winning team: Galway (7th win)
- Captain: Enda Colleran
- Manager: John "Tull" Dunne

All-Ireland Finalists
- Losing team: Meath
- Captain: Dave Carty
- Manager: P. Tully; Peter McDermott

Provincial Champions
- Munster: Cork
- Leinster: Meath
- Ulster: Down
- Connacht: Galway

Championship statistics
- No. matches played: 32
- Top Scorer: P. T. Treacy (4–12)
- Player of the Year: Mattie McDonagh

The 1966 All-Ireland Senior Football Championship was the 80th staging of the All-Ireland Senior Football Championship, the Gaelic Athletic Association's premier inter-county Gaelic football tournament. The championship began on 1 May 1966 and ended on 25 September 1966.

Galway entered the championship as the defending champions in search of a third successive championship title.

On 25 September 1966, Galway won the championship following a 1–10 to 0–7 defeat of Meath in the All-Ireland final. This was their seventh All-Ireland title overall and their third championship in succession.

Fermanagh's P. T. Treacy was the championship's top scorer with 4–12. Galway's Mattie McDonagh was the choice for Texaco Footballer of the Year.

== Connacht Championship format change ==
Normal system back with just 1 Quarter-final vs 2 Semi-finals as usual.

== Results ==
=== Connacht Senior Football Championship ===
Quarter-final

12 June 1966 Quarter-final	Leitrim	0–4 – 3–7	Roscommon	Páirc Seán Mac Diarmada, Carrick-on-Shannon
			D Earley 1–2, N Daly 1–1, P Heneghan 1–0, T White 0–3, E Curley 0–1.

Semi-finals

19 June 1966 Semi-final	Sligo	1–12 – 1–12	Mayo	Markievicz Park, Sligo
	M Kearins 0–10, S Durkin 1–0, B Shannon 0–2.		J Corcoran 0–8, M Ruane 1–1, J Flanagan 0–1, M Connaughton 0–1, P Kilbane 0–1.	Referee: L Maguire (Cavan)

26 June 1966 Semi-final	Galway	1–11 – 0–5	Roscommon	MacHale Park, Castlebar
	J Keenan 1–3, P Donnellan 0–3, M Reynolds 0–1, C Dunne 0–1, M McDonagh 0–1, S Leydon 0–1, J Donnellan 0–1.		E Curley 0–2, D Earley 0–1, T Heneghan 0–1, T White 0–1.	Attendance: 10,000; Referee: E Moules (Wicklow)

3 July 1966 Semi-final replay	Mayo	4–7 – 3–7	Sligo	MacHale Park, Castlebar
	M Ruane 3–1, V Jordan 1–0, J Corcoran 0–3, M Connaughton 0–2, J Gibbons 0–1.		M Kearins 1–3, D McHugh 1–2, B Shannon 1–0, G McManus 0–1, S Davy 0–1.	Referee: L Maguire (Cavan)

Final

17 July 1966 Final	Mayo	1–8 – 0–12	Galway	MacHale Park, Castlebar
	MJ Ruddy 1–0, J Langan 0–2, J Corcoran 0–2, M Ruane 0–2, M Connaughton 0–1, T Kilbane 0–1.		C Dunne 0–7, J Keenan 0–1, M McDonagh 0–1, L Sammon 0–1, J Duggan 0–1, M Reynolds 0–1.	Attendance: 28,000; Referee: J Martin (Tyrone)

=== Leinster Senior Football Championship ===
First round

1 May 1966 First round	Wexford	0–12 – 0–6	Wicklow	Páirc Uí Shíocháin, Gorey
	S Keevans 0–6, S Sheridan 0–4, T Nolan 0–1, T O'Leary 0–1.		T Humphries 0–4, B Francis 0–2.	Referee: P Kelly (Dublin)

1 May 1966 First round	Westmeath	2–10 – 2–6	Carlow	St. Conleth's Park, Newbridge
	T Dolan 1–2, P Buckley 1–1, D Murtagh 0–2, P Bradley 0–2, M Carley 0–1, D Gallagher 0–1, J Moran 0–1.		T Keogh 1–4, P McNally 1–1, S King 0–1.	Referee: J Hatton (Wicklow)

8 May 1966 First round	Louth	0–13 – 0–7	Longford	Páirc Tailteann, Navan
	L Leech 0–5, P Judge 0–4, J Mulroy 0–2, S McEntee 0–1, B Gaughran 0–1.		B Burns 0–5, J Hanniffy 0–1, S Murray 0–1.

Quarter-finals

15 May 1966 Quarter-final	Meath	4–15 – 0–3	Wexford	Croke Park, Dublin
	T Brennan 3–2, T Browne 1–1, D Carthy 0–5, M Sullivan 0–3, G Quinn 0–3, O Shanley 0–1.		S Sheridan 0–2, J Foley 0–1.

15 May 1966 Quarter-final	Kildare	1–9 – 2–6	Offaly	Croke Park, Dublin
	J Donnelly 0–6, P Dunny 1–1, P Mangan 0–1, P Connolly 0–1.		O Kilmuarry 1–0, S Mulligan 1–0, T Greene 0–3, L Coughlan 0–1, T McTague 0–1, S Evans 0–1.	Attendance: 13,828; Referee: P Kelly (Dublin)

5 June 1966 Quarter-final	Westmeath	2–12 – 1–5	Laois	O'Connor Park, Tullamore
	T Buckley 0–6, T Dolan 1–2, P Bradley 0–1, D Gallagher 0–1, T Moran 0–1, D Dolan 0–1.		G Rankins 1–0, F Walsh 0–3, B Delaney 0–1, D Delaney 0–1.	Referee: J Dowling (Offaly)

12 June 1966 Quarter-final	Louth	0–8 – 2–10	Dublin	Drogheda Park, Drogheda
	L Leech 0–5, M Leech 0–1, H Donnelly 0–1, P Judge 0–1.		J Timmons 1–5, G Davey 1–1, J Keaveney 0–2, D Bollard 0–1, A Donnelly 0–1.	Attendance: 21,000; Referee: J Dowling (Offaly)

19 June 1966 Quarter-final replay	Offaly	1–7 – 1–12	Kildare	Croke Park, Dublin
	P McCormack 1–0, W Brien 0–2, T McTague 0–2, T Greene 0–1, P Mulhaire 0–1, O Kilmurray 0–1.		J Donnelly 0–7, P Kelly 1–2, P Connolly 0–2, P Mangan 0–1.	Referee: J Shannon (Dublin)

Semi-finals

26 June 1966 Semi-final	Meath	2–14 – 1–8	Westmeath	Croke Park, Dublin
	H Quinn 1–3, D Carty 0–4, T Browne 1–0, M Sullivan 0–2, T Brennan 0–2, O Shanley 0–1, J Fagan 0–1, N Curran 0–1.		P Buckley 0–5, D Dolan 1–0, T Dolan 0–1, J Bradley 0–1, S Moran 0–1.

10 July 1966 Semi-final	Kildare	3–9 – 2–5	Dublin	Páirc Tailteann, Navan
	P Dunny 3–2, P Connolly 0–3, J Donnelly 0–3, L Casey 0–1.		J Timmons 1–4, G Davey 1–0, T Donnelly 0–1.	Attendance: 16,500; Referee: P Hughes (Louth)

Final

24 July 1966 Final	Meath	1–9 – 1–8	Kildare	Croke Park, Dublin
	Murty O'Sullivan 0–5 (0-4f), Tom Browne 0–4 (0-1f), Ollie Shanley 1–0		Jack Donnelly 0-5f, Toss Walsh 1–0, Pat Mangan, Pa Connolly, Pat Dunny (0-1f) 0–1 each	Attendance: 48,486; Referee: John Dowling (Offaly)

=== Munster Senior Football Championship ===
Quarter-finals

15 May 1966 Quarter-final	Clare	0–4 – 3–11	Cork	Cusack Park, Ennis
	P McMahon 02-, M Begley 0–1, J Tubridy 0–1.		G McCarthy 1–3, E Ryan 1–2, E Philpott 0–4, B O'Keeffe 1–0, T Hayes 0–2.

29 May 1966 Quarter-final	Waterford	2–3 – 3–8	Tipperary	Fraher Field, Dungarvan
	TJ Garty 2–0, M Guiry 0–1, T Walsh 0–1, T Kirwan 0–1.		M Keating 1–2, P O'Connell 1–2, B Keating 1–0, P Archibald 0–2, L Connolly 0–2.	Referee: S Quaid (Limerick)

Semi-finals

26 June 1966 Semi-final	Cork	5–10 – 1–8	Limerick	Fitzgerald Stadium, Killarney
	C O'Sullivan 2–4, M O'Loughlin 2–1, G McCarthy 1–2, F Hayes 0–2, J Carroll 0–1.		M Tynan 0–4, T Meaney 1–0, P Reidy 0–2, D Quirke 0–1, D Sheehan 0–1.	Referee: K Barry (Kerry)

26 June 1966 Semi-final	Kerry	3–16 – 2–6	Tipperary	Fitzgerald Stadium, Killarney
	D O'Shea 1–4, S Fitzgerald 1–2, M O'Connell 0–5, T Prendergast 1–1, P Griffin 0–3, D Geaney 0–1.		M Keating 1–3, R Strang 1–1, P Archibald 0–1, J Hewitt 0–1.	Referee: F Halbert (Cork)

Final

17 July 1966 Final	Kerry	1–7 – 2–7	Cork	Fitzgerald Stadium, Killarney
	T Barrett 1–0, T Moynihan 0–2, T Prendergast 0–2, M O'Connell 0–1, PJ Fitzpatrick 0–1, P Griffin 0–1.		G McCarthy 1–1, J Carroll 1–0, A Ryan 0–3, E Philpott 0–1, C O'Sullivan 0–1, M Burke 0–1.	Referee: J Martin (Roscommon)

=== Ulster Senior Football Championship ===
Preliminary round

5 June 1966 Preliminary round	Monaghan	0–12 – 3–8	Fermanagh	St. Tiernach's Park, Clones
			PT Treacy 2–4, J Fitzpatrick 1–1, Greene 0–2, Henderson 0–1,

Quarter-finals

5 June 1966 Quarter-final	Antrim	2–7 – 0–6	Derry	Casement Park, Belfast
	Lynn 1–1, J Murray 1–1, J McDonnell 0–2, H Murphy 0–2, H Brady 0–1.		S O'Connell 0–5, JJ Kearney 0–1.

12 June 1966 Quarter-final	Tyrone	0–4 – 2–9	Down	O'Neill Park, Dungannon
	N Timlin 0–2, P Harte 0–1, M Murphy 0–1.		S O'Neill 1–3, J McCartan 1–1, F Quigley 0–1, D McCartan 0–1, J McAlinden 0–1, E Trainor 0–1, R Murphy 0–1.	Attendance: 8,000; Referee: L Maguire (Cavan)

19 June 1966 Quarter-final	Cavan	1–11 – 5–6	Donegal	Breffni Park, Cavan
	G Gallagher 1–4, T Lynch 0–3, P Murray 0–2, KJ O'Reilly 0–1, P Tinnelly 0–1.		M McLoone 1–4, D Houlihan 2–0, S Ferriter 1–1, P Kelly 1–0, J Hannigan 0–1.	Referee: J Martin (Tyrone)

26 June 1966 Quarter-final	Fermanagh	3–8 – 0–8	Armagh	St. Molaise Park, Irvinestown
	PT Treacy 2–3, M Brewster 1–2, P Fitzpatrick 0–2, S Quinn 0–1.		J Whan 0–4, E Casey 0–2, D Kelly 0–1, M McCreesh 0–1.	Referee: J Martin (Tyrone)

Semi-finals

10 July 1966 Semi-final	Antrim	0–5 – 0–9	Down	Casement Park, Belfast
	S McQuillan 0–2, A McAtamney 0–1, G McEvoy 0–1, J McDonnell 0–1,		J Fitzsimmons 0–3, J McCartan 0–2, S O'Neill 0–2, C McAlarney 0–1, F Quigley 0–1.	Referee: F Tierney (Cavan)

17 July 1966 Semi-final	Fermanagh	1–8 – 4–17	Donegal	O'Neill Park, Dungannon
	PT Treacy 0–5, P Fitzpatrick 1–1, J Maguire 0–1, K Murphy 0–1.		M McCloone 2–4, J Hannigan 2–3, P McShea 0–4, S Ferriter 0–2, D O'Carroll 0–1, M Griffin 0–1, D Hoilihan 0–1, PJ Flood 0–1.	Attendance: 8,000

Final

31 July 1966 Final	Down	1–7 – 0–8	Donegal	Casement Park, Belfast
	S O'Neill 1–2, P Doherty 0–3, R Johnston 0–1, J McCartan 0–1.		M McLoone 0–6, M Griffin 0–1, F McFeely 0–1.	Attendance: 35,000; Referee: J Martin (Tyrone)

=== All-Ireland Senior Football Championship ===
Semi-finals

7 August 1966 Semi-final	Galway	1–11 – 1–9	Cork	Croke Park, Dublin
	C Dunne 1–7, S Cleary 0–2, J Keenan 0–1, M McDonagh 0–1.		C O'SUllivan 0–5, M O'Loughlin 1–0, J Carroll 0–2, E McCarthy 0–1, E Philpott 0–1.	Attendance: 30,966; Referee: E Moules (Wicklow)

21 August 1966 Semi-final	Meath	2–16 – 1–9	Down	Croke Park, Dublin
	G Quinn 2–0, N Curran 0–6, M Sullivan 0–4, T Browne 0–2, O Shanley 0–2, P Collier 0–1, P Moore 0–1.		P Doherty 0–5, B Johnston 1–1, S O'Neill 0–2, J Fitzsimmons 0–1.	Attendance: 44,463; Referee: M Loftus (Mayo)

Final

25 September 1966 Final	Galway	1–10 – 0–7	Meath	Croke Park, Dublin
	M McDonagh 1–1, J Keenan 0–3, C Dunne 0–3, L Sammon 0–1, S Leydon 0–1, S Cleary 0–1.		N Curran 0–2, O Shanley 0–2, M Sullivan 0–2, T Brown 0–1.	Attendance: 71,569; Referee: J Hatton (Wicklow)

== Championship statistics ==
=== Miscellaneous ===
- Cork stop Kerry to 9 Munster titles in a row in the Munster final.
- The All Ireland semi-final between Meath and Down was their first ever championship meeting.
- Galway were All Ireland Champions for the third year in a row and Connacht champions for the fourth year in a row.

=== Top scorers ===
Overall

Rank	Player	County	Tally	Total	Matches	Average
1	P. T. Treacy	Fermanagh	4–12	24	3	8.00
2	Michael McLoone	Donegal	3–14	23	3	7.66
3	Cyril Dunne	Galway	1–18	21	4	5.25
3	Jack Donnelly	Kildare	0–21	21	4	5.25
5	Mick Ruane	Mayo	4–4	16	3	5.33
5	Pat Dunny	Kildare	4–4	16	3	5.33
5	Con O'Sullivan	Cork	2–10	16	4	4.00
5	Mickey Kearns	Sligo	1–13	16	2	8.00
9	John Timmons	Dublin	2–9	15	2	7.50
9	Seán O'Neill	Down	2–9	15	4	3.75

Single game

Rank	Player	County	Tally	Total	Opposition
1	Tony Brennan	Meath	3–2	11	Wexford
1	Pat Dunny	Kildare	3–2	11	Dublin
3	Mick Ruane	Mayo	3–1	10	Sligo
3	Con O'Sullivan	Cork	2–4	10	Limerick
3	P. T. Treacy	Fermanagh	2–4	10	Monaghan
3	Michael McLoone	Donegal	2–4	10	Fermanagh
3	Cyril Dunne	Galway	1–7	10	Cork
3	Mickey Kearns	Sligo	0–10	10	Mayo
9	P. T. Treacy	Fermanagh	2–3	9	Armagh
9	John Hannigan	Donegal	2–3	9	Fermanagh
