= 1962 All-Ireland Senior Football Championship final =

- Event: 1962 All-Ireland Senior Football Championship
Kerry	Roscommon
1–12 (15)	1–6 (9)
- Date: 23 September 1962
- Venue: Croke Park, Dublin
- Referee: Eamonn Moules (Wicklow)
- Attendance: 75,771

The 1962 All-Ireland Senior Football Championship final was the 75th All-Ireland Final and the deciding match of the 1962 All-Ireland Senior Football Championship, an inter-county Gaelic football tournament for the top teams in Ireland.

This marked the first occasion on which the final was televised.

== Pre-match ==
Roscommon played Sligo in the 1962 Connacht SFC final and were behind for much of the match. Sligo were blighted by a sudden string of injuries, missed a '50 while two points ahead in the final minute, and then gifted soon-to-be All-Ireland SFC finalists Roscommon a goal, allowing them to progress at Sligo's expense in what newspaper columnist Eamonn Sweeney described as "one of the great football tragedies in Connacht".

== Match ==
This year's final was played on 23 September.

=== Summary ===
Garry McMahon scored a goal for Kerry after 35 seconds and Kerry hit a point quickly after, and victory was never in doubt. McMahon's goal was the fastest in the history of All-Ireland SFC finals. Until Garristown man Dean Rock scored for Dublin against Mayo in the 2020 final.

=== Details ===
Kerry
Roscommon

==== Kerry ====
- 1 J. Culloty
- 2 S. Murphy
- 3 N. Sheehy
- 4 T. Lyons
- 5 S. Óg Sheehy (c)
- 6 N. Lucey
- 7 M. O'Dwyer
- 8 M. O'Connell
- 9 J. Lucey
- 10 D. McAuliffe
- 11 T. O'Sullivan
- 12 J. O'Riordan
- 13 G. McMahon
- 14 T. Long
- 15 P. Sheehy

Subs used
18 J. J. Barrett for T. Lyons
17 K. Coffey for D. McAuliffe

Subs not used
16 D. Geaney
19 S. Roche
20 D. O'Sullivan
21 P. Aherne

==== Roscommon ====
- 1 A. Brady
- 2 J. J. Breslin
- 3 J. Lynch
- 4 O. Moran
- 5 R. Craven
- 6 G. O'Malley (c)
- 7 G. Reilly
- 8 B. Kyne
- 9 J. Kelly
- 10 G. Geraghty
- 11 É. Curley
- 12 T. Whyte
- 13 Don Feely
- 14 C. Mahon
- 15 Des Feely

Subs used
T. Turley for G. Reilly
T. Kenny for T. Turley

Trainer
D. Keenan
