= Austin Garvin =

Irish Gaelic football manager and sports journalist (1945–2022)

- Born: Austin P. Garvin; 1945; Claremorris, County Mayo, Ireland
- Died: 19 November 2022 (aged 76); Castlebar, County Mayo, Ireland
- Occupations: Sports journalist, broadcaster and Gaelic football manager

Austin P. Garvin (1945 – 16 November 2022) was an Irish Gaelic football manager who had success with the Mayo minor football team. He later worked as a sports journalist and broadcaster.

== Career ==
Garvin played Gaelic football to a high level with Claremorris but was forced to retire in his mid-twenties. He later took on roles as a coach, trainer and manager and guided the Mayo minor football team to the All-Ireland MFC title in 1971. Garvin was again in charge when the Mayo minors won a second title in 1978. His other managerial honours include seven Connacht MFC titles between 1971 and 1980.

After retiring from his career with Eircom, Garvin became a freelance journalist. His largest body of work was as a Gaelic games correspondent with the Western People and the Mayo News; however, he also covered Claremorris Municipal District meetings and other events across south Mayo. Garvin also worked as a Gaelic games broadcaster with MidWest Radio.

== Death ==
Garvin died at the Mayo Hospice in Castlebar on 16 November 2022, at the age of 76.

== Honours ==
Mayo

- All-Ireland Minor Football Championship: 1971, 1978
- Connacht Minor Football Championship: 1971, 1973, 1974, 1977, 1978, 1979, 1980
