= Kevin Coffey =

Irish Gaelic football player (1933–1981)

Personal information
- Native name: Caoimhín Ó Cofaigh (Irish)
- Born: 1933 Beaufort, County Kerry, Ireland
- Died: 6 December 1981 (aged 48) Rathgar, Dublin, Ireland
- Occupation: ESB executive officer
- Height: 6 ft 0 in (183 cm)

Sport
- Sport: Gaelic football
- Position: Centre-back
Club
- Years: Club
- Clanna Gael
Inter-county
Years	County	Apps (scores)
1956–1964	Kerry	19 (0-02)
Inter-county titles
- Munster titles: 7
- All-Irelands: 2
- NFL: 3

Bartholomew Kevin Coffey (1933 – 6 December 1981) was an Irish Gaelic footballer. He played at club level with Clanna Gael in Dublin and at inter-county level with the Kerry senior football team.

== Career ==
Coffey first came to Gaelic football prominence as a student at Goud Counsel College in New Ross when he was part of a Leinster Junior Colleges Championship title-winning team in the early fifties. His first appearance with the Kerry senior football team was in a London tournament game in 1956. Coffey made his competitive debut two years later and won the first of seven successive Munster Championship titles that year. He won his first All-Ireland Championship title at centre-back in 1959, before coming on as a substitute to claim a second winners' medal after a defeat of Roscommon in 1962. Coffey was also a two-time All-Ireland runner-up and was involved in three National League title-winning teams. He spent his entire club career with Clanna Gael in Dublin before later becoming involved with the Kilmacud Crokes club. Coffey was a selector with the Dublin minor team that beat Kerry to win the 1979 All-Ireland Minor Championship title.

== Personal life and death ==
Coffey spent his entire working life with the Electricity Supply Board. After his first posting to Dundalk, he later transferred to Dublin where he reached the position of higher executive officer. Coffey died after a period of ill health aged 48 at St Luke's Hospital in Rathgar on 6 December 1981.

== Honours ==
=== Player ===
Kerry

- All-Ireland Senior Football Championship: 1959, 1962
- Munster Senior Football Championship: 1958, 1959, 1960, 1961, 1962, 1963, 1964
- National Football League: 1958–59, 1960–61, 1962-63

=== Selector ===
Dublin

- All-Ireland Minor Football Championship: 1979
- Munster Minor Football Championship: 1979
