= Noel Lucey =

Irish Gaelic footballer (1939–2021)

Personal information
- Native name: Nollaig Ó Luasaigh (Irish)
- Born: Jeremiah Noel Lucey; 1939 Caragh Lake, County Kerry, Ireland
- Died: 19 July 2021 (aged 82) Glenflesk, County Kerry, Ireland
- Occupation: Air Corps member
- Height: 6 ft 0 in (183 cm)

Sport
- Sport: Gaelic football
- Position: Centre-back
Clubs
- Years: Club
- Glenbeigh-Glencar; Laune Rangers; Mid Kerry
Club titles
- Kerry titles: 1
Inter-county
Years	County	Apps (scores)
1962–1963	Kerry	5 (0–00)
Inter-county titles
- Munster titles: 1
- All-Irelands: 1
- NFL: 1
- All Stars: 0

Jeremiah Noel Lucey (1939 – 19 July 2021) was an Irish Gaelic footballer. He played at club level with Glenbeigh-Glencar, Laune Rangers and Mid Kerry and at inter-county level with the Kerry senior football team.

== Career ==
Born in Caragh Lake, County Kerry, Lucey first played Gaelic football with Glenbeigh-Glencar before transferring to the Laune Rangers club. He won a County Championship title with divisional side Mid Kerry in 1967. Having never played at minor inter-county level, Lucey first was included on the Kerry senior football team during a number of tournament games in early 1962. He ended the season with an All-Ireland Championship title after lining out at centre-back in the final defeat of Roscommon. His brother, Jimmy Lucey, also lined out that day, while a third brother, Vincent Lucey, played in the 1965 All-Ireland final defeat by Galway. Lucey's inter-county career ended after just two seasons, by which stage he had also secured a National League title.

== Death ==
Lucey died in Glenflesk, County Kerry on 19 July 2021.

== Career statistics ==
Team	Season	National League			Munster		All-Ireland		Total	
Team	Season	Division	Apps	Score	Apps	Score	Apps	Score	Apps	Score
Kerry	1961–62	Division 1	0	0–00	2	0–00	1	0–00	3	0–00
Kerry	1962–63	Division 1	3	0–00	2	0–00	—		5	0–00
Career total			3	0–00	4	0–00	1	0–00	8	0–00

== Honours ==
Mid Kerry

- Kerry Senior Football Championship: 1967

Kerry

- All-Ireland Senior Football Championship: 1962
- Munster Senior Football Championship: 1962
- National Football League: 1962-63
