= Jimmy Lucey =

Irish Gaelic football player

Personal information
- Native name: Séamus Ó Luasaigh (Irish)
- Born: 1941 Caragh Lake, County Kerry, Ireland
- Died: 16 February 1969 (aged 27) Rathgar, Dublin, Ireland
- Occupation: Army sergeant
- Height: 5 ft 10 in (178 cm)

Sport
- Sport: Gaelic football
- Position: Midfield
Clubs
- Years: Club
- Glenbeigh-Glencar; Laune Rangers; Mid Kerry
Club titles
- Kerry titles: 1
Inter-county
| Years | County | Apps (scores) |
| 1962–1966 | Kerry | 8 (0-00) |
Inter-county titles
- Munster titles: 3
- All-Irelands: 1
- NFL: 1
- All Stars: 0

James Lucey (1941 – 16 February 1969) was an Irish Gaelic footballer. He played at club level with Glenbeigh-Glencar, Laune Rangers and Mid Kerry and at inter-county level with the Kerry senior football team.

== Career ==
Born in Caragh Lake, County Kerry, Lucey first played Gaelic football with Glenbeigh-Glencar. He won a County Championship title with divisional side Mid Kerry in 1967. After briefly appearing for the Kerry minor football team during the early rounds of the championship in 1958, Lucey was drafted onto the Kerry senior football team during a number of tournament games in early 1962. He ended the season with an All-Ireland Championship title after lining out at midfield in the final defeat of Roscommon. His brother, Noel Lucey, also lined out that day, while a third brother, Vincent Lucey, played in the 1965 All-Ireland final defeat by Galway. Lucey's inter-county career ended in 1966, by which stage he had also secured a National League title and several Munster Championship titles.

== Personal life and death ==
Lucey secured a place in the first Army Apprentice School class at Devoy Barracks in 1956. After a three-year apprenticeship he became a fitter and a mechanic in the Cavalry Corps. He served two terms with the United Nations Peacekeeping Operation in the Congo and was one of 154 soldiers involved in the Siege of Jadotville.

Lucey died from Hodgkins disease at St Luke's Hospital in Rathgar on 16 February 1969. Aged 27, he was the first member of the 1962 All-Ireland-winning team to die.

== Career statistics ==
| Team | Season | National League | | | Munster | | All-Ireland | | Total | |
| Team | Season | Division | Apps | Score | Apps | Score | Apps | Score | Apps | Score |
|---|---|---|---|---|---|---|---|---|---|---|
| Kerry | 1961–62 | Division 1 | 0 | 0-00 | 2 | 0-01 | 2 | 0-00 | 4 | 0-01 |
| Kerry | 1962–63 | Division 1 | 5 | 0-00 | 1 | 0-00 | 1 | 0-00 | 7 | 0-00 |
| Kerry | 1963–64 | Division 1 | 5 | 0-00 | 0 | 0-00 | 0 | 0-00 | 5 | 0-00 |
| Kerry | 1964–65 | Division 1 | 2 | 0-00 | 2 | 0-00 | 0 | 0-00 | 4 | 0-00 |
| Kerry | 1965–66 | Division 1 | 2 | 0-00 | 0 | 0-00 | — | | 4 | 0-00 |
| Career total | | | 14 | 0-00 | 5 | 0-01 | 3 | 0-00 | 24 | 0-01 |

== Honours ==
Mid Kerry

- Kerry Senior Football Championship: 1967

Kerry

- All-Ireland Senior Football Championship: 1962
- Munster Senior Football Championship: 1962, 1963, 1965
- National Football League: 1962–63
