= Tom Long (Gaelic footballer) =

Irish Gaelic footballer (1936–2023)

Personal information
- Native name: Tomás Ó Lúing (Irish)
- Born: 1936 Ventry, County Kerry, Ireland
- Died: 13 February 2023 (aged 86–87) Killarney, County Kerry, Ireland
- Occupation: Primary school principal
- Height: 5 ft 10 in (178 cm)

Sport
- Sport: Gaelic football
- Position: Centre-Forward
Clubs
- Years: Club
- An Ghaeltacht; West Kerry; Fossa; Dr. Crokes
Club titles
- Kerry titles: 0
Inter-county*
Years	County	Apps (scores)
1956-1964	Kerry	26 (5-22)
Inter-county titles
- Munster titles: 7
- All-Irelands: 2
- NFL: 3
- *Inter County team apps and scores correct as of 20:57, 9 December 2016.

Thomas Long (1936 – 13 February 2023) was an Irish Gaelic footballer. His league and championship career with the Kerry senior team spanned nine seasons from 1956 to 1964.

Long made his debut on the inter-county scene at the age of seventeen when he was selected for the Kerry minor team. He enjoyed one championship season with the minor team, however, he ended the season as All-Ireland runner-up. Long made his senior debut during the 1956 championship. Over the course of the next nine seasons, he won two All-Ireland medals in 1959 and 1962. Long also won seven Munster medals and three National Football League medals. He played his last game for Kerry in September 1964.

After being chosen on the Munster inter-provincial team for the first time in 1957, Long was a regular member of the starting fifteen at various times over the course of the following seven years. He ended his career without a Railway Cup medal.

Long's first cousin, Páidí Ó Sé, was an eight-time All-Ireland medal winner with Kerry between 1975 and 1986.

Long died on 13 February 2023, at the age of 86.

== Honours ==
Kerry

- All-Ireland Senior Football Championship (2): 1959, 1962
- Munster Senior Football Championship (7): 1958, 1959, 1960, 1961, 1962, 1963, 1964
- National Football League (3): 1958-59, 1960-61, 1962-63
- Munster Minor Football Championship (1): 1954
