= Jerry O'Riordan (Gaelic footballer) =

Irish Gaelic footballer (1939–2020)

Personal information
- Native name: Diarmuid Ó Ríordáin (Irish)
- Born: 1939 Glenbeigh, County Kerry, Ireland
- Died: 29 December 2020 (aged 81) Kilmallock, County Limerick, Ireland
- Height: 5 ft 10 in (178 cm)

Sport
- Sport: Gaelic football
- Position: Midfield
Clubs
- Years: Club
- Glenbeigh-Glencar; Mid Kerry
Club titles
- Kerry titles: 1
Inter-county
Years	County	Apps (scores)
1961-1965	Kerry	4 (0-00)
Inter-county titles
- Munster titles: 2
- All-Irelands: 1
- NFL: 0

Jerry O'Riordan (1939 – 29 December 2020) was an Irish Gaelic footballer. At club level he played with Glenbeigh-Glencar and divisional side Mid Kerry and was an All-Ireland Championship winner with the Kerry senior football team.

== Playing career ==
Born in Glenbeigh, O'Riordan first enjoyed success at club level in 1956 when he won a Mid Kerry Championship title. He won three more divisional titles in a club career that lasted 20 years, as well as a County Championship title with Mid Kerry in 1967. O'Riordan made his first appearance for the Kerry senior football team in the first round of the 1961-62 league, ending his debut season by winning an All-Ireland Championship medal after lining out at right wing-forward in the final against Roscommon. He also won back-to-back Munster Championship medals before playing his last game in the fourth round of the 1964-65 league.

== Honours ==
Glenbeigh-Glencar

- Mid Kerry Senior Football Championship (4): 1956, 1964, 1974, 1975

Mid Kerry

- Kerry Senior Football Championship (1): 1967

Kerry

- All-Ireland Senior Football Championship (1): 1962
- Munster Senior Football Championship (2): 1962, 1963
