= Timmy O'Sullivan =

Irish Gaelic football player

Personal information
- Native name: Tadhg Ó Súilleabháin (Irish)
- Born: 1939 Castleisland, County Kerry, Ireland
- Died: 2 July 1994 (aged 55) Castleisland, County Kerry, Ireland
- Height: 5 ft 10 in (178 cm)

Sport
- Sport: Gaelic football
- Position: Centre-forward
Clubs
- Years: Club
- Castleislands Desmonds; Kingdom
Club titles
- Kerry titles: 0
Inter-county
Years	County	Apps (scores)
1960-1964	Kerry	7 (0-07)
Inter-county titles
- Munster titles: 4
- All-Irelands: 1
- NFL: 2

Timothy O'Sullivan (1939 – 2 July 1984) was an Irish Gaelic footballer. He played at club level with Castleislands Desmonds and Kingdom and at inter-county level with the Kerry senior football team.

== Career ==
O'Sullivan first came to Gaelic football prominence as captain of the Castleisland District team that won the 1957 County Minor Championship. He first appeared on the inter-county scene with the Kerry junior team that won the Munster Junior Championship title in 1960. O'Sullivan quickly progressed to the senior team and made his debut in the 1960-61 league. He was at centre-forward when Kerry won the 1962 All-Ireland Championship title after a defeat of Roscommon in the final. O'Sullivan also won four consecutive Munster Championship titles and was involved in two National League title-winning teams.

== Honours ==
Castleisland District

- Kerry Minor Football Championship: 1957 (c)

Kerry

- All-Ireland Senior Football Championship: 1962
- Munster Senior Football Championship: 1961, 1962, 1963, 1964
- National Football League: 1960-61, 1962-63
