= Vincent Lucey =

Irish Gaelic football player

Personal information
- Native name: Uinseann Ó Luasaigh (Irish)
- Born: 1943 Caragh Lake, County Kerry, Ireland
- Died: 25 June 1999 (aged 56) Limerick, Ireland
- Occupation: Air Corps member
- Height: 5 ft 10 in (178 cm)

Sport
- Sport: Gaelic football
- Position: Left corner-forward
Clubs
- Years: Club
- Glenbeigh-Glencar; Laune Rangers; Mid Kerry
Club titles
- Kerry titles: 1
Inter-county
Years	County	Apps (scores)
1963-1965	Kerry	6 (2-08)
Inter-county titles
- Munster titles: 1
- All-Irelands: 0
- NFL: 0

John Vincent Lucey (1943 – 25 June 1999) was an Irish Gaelic footballer. He played at club level with Glenbeigh-Glencar, Laune Rangers and Mid Kerry and at inter-county level with the Kerry senior football team.

== Career ==
Born in Caragh Lake, County Kerry, Lucey first played Gaelic football with Glenbeigh-Glencar before later joining the Laune Rangers club. He won a County Championship title with divisional side Mid Kerry in 1967. Lucey was a member of the Kerry team that won the Munster Vocational Schools' Championship in 1959 before later winning a Leinster Championship title with the Dublin minor team in 1961. He subsequently declared for his native county and was part of the Kerry under-21 team that won the inaugural All-Ireland Under-21 Championship title in 1964. Lucey followed his brothers Noel and Jimmy onto the Kerry senior football team and was at right wing-forward for Kerry's 1965 All-Ireland final defeat by Galway., having earlier won a Munster Championship title.

== Personal life and death ==
Lucey, like his brothers, joined the Irish Air Corps and was stationed in Baldonnel Aerodrome.<He died after a long period of illness at Milford Hospice in Limerick on 25 June 1999.

== Career statistics ==
Team	Season	National League			Munster		All-Ireland		Total	
Team	Season	Division	Apps	Score	Apps	Score	Apps	Score	Apps	Score
Kerry	1962-63	Division 1	0	0-00	2	1-02	0	0-00	2	1-02
Kerry	1963-64	Division 1	1	0-00	0	0-00	0	0-00	1	0-00
Kerry	1964-65	Division 1	4	0-05	2	1-06	2	0-00	8	1-11
Career total			5	0-05	4	2-08	2	0-00	11	2-13

== Honours ==
Mid Kerry

- Kerry Senior Football Championship: 1967

Dublin

- Leinster Minor Football Championship: 1961

Kerry

- Munster Senior Football Championship: 1965
- All-Ireland Under-21 Football Championship: 1964
- Munster Under-21 Football Championship: 1964
