= Liam Kearns =

Irish Gaelic footballer and manager (1962–2023)

Personal information
- Native name: Liam Ó Ciaráin (Irish)
- Born: 1962 Tralee, County Kerry, Ireland
- Died: 12 March 2023 (aged 61) Clonlara, County Clare, Ireland
- Occupation: Garda Síochána

Sport
- Sport: Gaelic football
- Position: Centre-forward
Club
- Years: Club
- Austin Stacks
Club titles
- Kerry titles: 1
Inter-county*
Years	County	Apps (scores)
1984–1989	Kerry	0 (0–0)
Inter-county titles
- Munster titles: 0
- All-Irelands: 0
- NFL: 0
- All Stars: 0
- *Inter County team apps and scores correct as of 18:04, 13 March 2023.

Liam Kearns (1962 – 12 March 2023) was an Irish Gaelic football manager and player. He last managed Offaly from 2022, until his death in 2023.

Kearns previously managed the Limerick, Laois and Tipperary county teams, as well as several clubs in different counties. He led Tipperary to a 2016 All-Ireland Senior Football Championship semi-final, the county's first since 1935. After leaving Tipperary and before being appointed Offaly manager, Kearns managed Clann na nGael GAA (Roscommon).

== Early life ==
Kearns's father Ollie captained Kerry to an All-Ireland MFC final in the late 1950s. His father Ollie was then a wing-forward on the Graiguecullen team that won their last Laois Senior Football Championship title in 1965.

== Playing career ==
As a player, Liam Kearns was a member of the Austin Stacks club and played for the Kerry minor team for two years, winning an All-Ireland Minor Football Championship (MFC) with them in 1980.

Kearns graduated to become a member of the Kerry under-21 and senior football panels and won a Kerry Senior Football Championship medal with Austin Stacks in 1986.

== Managerial career ==
=== Limerick ===
Kearns coached the Na Piarsaigh club to the Limerick Under-21 Football Championship in 1997, the club's only under-21 county football title. That team included Declan Lynch (Head of Sports Medicine Bath Rugby), Mike Prendergast (Munster Rugby coach), Ian Costello (former Munster Rugby backs coach) and Comdt Joe Mullins, who captained it.

Kearns turned Limerick into the second team in Munster as they outflanked Cork.

Kearns managed the Limerick under-21 team to successive Munster titles and to an appearance in the All-Ireland Under-21 Football Championship final. In 2003 he led Limerick to a Division 2 National Football League (NFL) final, where they were beaten by Westmeath on the same day that Laois lost to Tyrone in the Division 1 decider.

The following year he led Limerick to a defeat of Laois in a Division 1 NFL tie at the Gaelic Grounds, and, that year, Limerick reached the Munster Senior Football Championship final, which they lost on a replay to Kerry.

Kearns spent six years managing Limerick and helped to raise the county's profile.

Following a heavy defeat to Cork in the 1999 Munster Senior Football Championship, at Pairc Ui Rinn, Limerick Football Manager, Paddy Mulvihill and his selectors Eddie Ryan and Sonny Crowley stepped down. Liam Kearns was the choice to succeed Paddy Mulvihill as manager. He also took the Limerick Under 21 football job. Limerick had reached successive Munster Minor Football Finals in 1997 and 1998 and a crop of promising talent was beginning to emerge at Under 21 level. The creation of a County Football Board in Limerick a few years earlier was taking effect.

In the Spring of 2000, Limerick beat Cork at Pairc Ui Chaoimh, and then Waterford at Dungarvan to win the Munster Under 21 Football Championship, captained by John Galvin. Kearns then led them to the All Ireland Final after defeating Westmeath in the All Ireland Semi Final at Portlaoise. The All Ireland Final against Tyrone, played at Mullingar was to end in defeat. Tyrone would dominate football at Senior Level for the next decade and their manager would become well known, Mickey Harte.

Liam Kearns's Munster Senior Championship began in Kilmallock in 2000 against reigning Munster Champions Cork. He infiltrated the team with the successful Under 21 players and they gave Cork a serious contest, before bowing out in the end. However, there were signs that Limerick were showing promise and building under Kearns.

In 2001, Limerick made a brave bid to defend their Munster Under 21 title. They beat Tipperary at Mitchelstown, but were dethroned in the Munster Final at Kilmallock by a Cork team including Graham Canty. Kearns stood down as Limerick Under 21 manager later in 2001, citing a wish to focus exclusively on the Limerick Senior Football job.

For the 2001 Championship, John Galvin had gone travelling, but a number of the younger players had emerged, and they performed creditably in Killarney in the Munster Senior Football Championship, losing in the end by 1-15 to 0-10. In the first year of the qualifiers, they were drawn at home to Westmeath, and were beaten comprehensively in the end, though not without showing signs of promise throughout the year.

In 2002, with the Under 21 commitments deferred to a new management team of Liam Fahy and Tom Casey, Kearns prioritised the league. Kerry were beaten at the Gaelic Grounds in a group game, but Armagh proved too strong at the Athletic Grounds on a day that Dual Player Stephen Lucey was playing with Limerick hurlers in Thurles. Nevertheless, Limerick footballers remained in the hunt for promotion, but slipped up against Louth and missed out.

Their championship was to prove more fruitful. An early goal from Johnny Murphy (now an intercounty hurling referee) set them on their way against Kerry at the Gaelic Grounds in the Munster Senior Football Championship. However Kerry found some late scores, and advanced in the championship by 0-14 to 1-7. Learnings were taken from defeat and a qualifier odyssey began with home (draw AET) and away (victory) games against Cavan, followed by a home win over Offaly, and finally a defeat to Mayo at Dr Hyde Park. Liam Kearns was making his mark at senior level. Limerick had played 5 top class competitive championship matches in 2002 culminating in a loss to Mayo by a single point, 0-13 to 1-9.

The year 2003 saw Liam Kearns take Limerick to another level, reaching the Division 2 League Final, gaining promotion to Division 1 for 2004 in the process. They lost to Westmeath in that League Final by a single point, but atoned a week later by dumping Cork out of the Munster Championship on a scoreline of 0-16 to 0-6. Clare were beaten before a Munster Final appearance awaited in Killarney. Kerry were victorious by 1-11 to 0-9 after Limerick had missed two penalties. Limerick lost to Armagh in the subsequent All Ireland Qualifier at Dr Hyde Park, Roscommon.

In 2004 Limerick reached a National Football League Division 1 Semi Final after a strong run of form through the group stages. They were beaten by Kerry at the Gaelic Grounds. It was widely seen as a great opportunity to beat Kerry. Having beaten Tipperary (0-16 to 3-5) and Waterford (1-18 to 0-7) in the Munster Championship, they had an even better opportunity to beat Kerry in the Munster Final at the Gaelic Grounds. Three late Eoin Keating frees were caught above the crossbar by Darragh O’Shea with a those inches depriving Limerick of a historic Munster Title. The game finished 1-10 to 1-10. The replay in Killarney was won by Kerry by 3-10 to 2-9 and the show was over. A qualifier defeat to Derry (0-10 to 0-7) finished the season at Dr Hyde Park Roscommon.

Liam Kearns returned for one last act in 2005, but Kerry beat them convincingly in the Gaelic Grounds. The Munster title dream was over and Kearns departed at the end of the season following a qualifier defeat to Derry at McHale Park Castlebar by 0-13 to 0-9 having beaten Carlow in an earlier qualifier by 2-15 to 0-7 at Dr Cullen Park, Carlow.

=== Laois ===
Tralee man Kearns (whose mother is from Laois) was appointed Mick O'Dwyer's successor as senior Laois county football team manager in September 2006. In being appointed he saw off the challenge of former Laois player Pat Roe, who had a successful spell in charge of Wexford. Laois reached the finals of both the O'Byrne Cup and Leinster SFC in his first season as manager: calls for Kearns to be sacked after one season, with former players and club delegates saying "the man has to go", went unheeded. He lasted until August 2008.

=== Tipperary ===
Kearns led Aherlow to the 2010 Tipperary Senior Football Championship title.

In November 2015, Kearns was named as manager of the Tipperary senior football team. In June 2016, Tipperary reached the Munster SFC final after a 3–15 to 2–16 win against Cork. They went on to defeat Derry by a scoreline of 1–21 to 2–17 in round 3A of the qualifiers to reach the All-Ireland SFC quarter-finals for the first time. On 31 July 2016, Tipperary defeated Galway in the All-Ireland SFC quarter-final at Croke Park to reach a first All-Ireland SFC semi-final since 1935. On 21 August 2016, Mayo defeated Tipperary in the semi-final by a scoreline of 2–13 to 0–14.

On 8 April 2017, Tipperary won the Division 3 final of the 2017 National Football League after a 3–19 to 0–19 win against Louth at Croke Park.

On 9 June 2019, Kearns resigned as Tipperary senior football team manager after defeat to Down in the 2019 All-Ireland Senior Football Championship.

After resigning as Tipperary manager, Kearns became manager of Roscommon GAA club Clann na nGael.

=== Offaly ===
On 11 August 2022, Kearns was announced as Offaly manager, succeeding John Maughan. He died suddenly in the middle of the 2023 National League campaign. Ahead of the first league game since his death (against Tipperary, another team that Kearns had managed) a moment of silence took place, with Offaly winning the game.

== Honours ==
=== Player ===
Austin Stacks

- Kerry Senior Football Championship: 1986

Kerry

- All-Ireland Minor Football Championship: 1980
- Munster Minor Football Championship: 1980

=== Management ===
Na Piarsaigh

- Limerick Under-21 Football Championship: 1997

Aherlow

- Tipperary Senior Football Championship: 2010

Limerick

- Munster Under-21 Football Championship: 2000

Tipperary

- National Football League Division 3: 2017

Gaelic games
Preceded by Paddy Mulvihill	Limerick senior football team manager 1999–2005	Succeeded by Mickey O'Sullivan
Preceded by Mick O'Dwyer	Laois senior football team manager 2006–2008	Succeeded by Seán Dempsey
Preceded by Peter Creedon	Tipperary senior football team manager 2015–2019	Succeeded by David Power
Preceded by John Maughan	Offaly senior football team manager 2022–2023	Succeeded by Martin Murphy (interim)
