= Seán Óg Sheehy =

Irish Gaelic footballer and hurler (1939–2024)

Personal information
- Native name: Seán Óg Mac Síthigh (Irish)
- Born: 24 May 1939 Tralee, County Kerry, Ireland
- Died: 31 May 2024 (aged 85) Tralee, County Kerry, Ireland
- Occupation: Teacher
- Height: 5 ft 9 in (175 cm)

Sport
- Sport: Gaelic football
- Position: Left wing-back
Club
- Years: Club
- John Mitchels
Club titles
- Kerry titles: 6
College(s)
- Years: College
- University College Cork; University College Dublin
College titles
- Sigerson titles: 0
Inter-county
Years	County	Apps (scores)
1961–1963	Kerry	7 (1–00)
Inter-county titles
- Munster titles: 2
- All-Irelands: 1
- NHL: 1

Seán Óg Sheehy (24 May 1939 – 31 May 2024) was an Irish Gaelic footballer. At club level he played with John Mitchels and at inter-county level with the Kerry senior football team. Sheehy captained Kerry to the All-Ireland SFC title in 1962.

== Early life ==
Born and raised in Tralee, County Kerry, his father, John Joe Sheehy, was a four-time All-Ireland SFC-winner and two-time winning captain with Kerry. Sheehy first played Gaelic football as a schoolboy with Tralee CBS and was a Munster Colleges runner-up in 1956. He later played with University College Cork and University College Dublin and was a Sigerson Cup runner-up in 1960.

== Club career ==
Sheehy began his club career at juvenile and underage levels with the John Mitchels club in Tralee. He eventually progressed to adult level and won his first Kerry SFC after a 3-09 to 1-10 defeat of Feale Rangers in the 1959 final replay. It was the first of a record-setting five successive Kerry SFC titles for John Mitchels, with Sheehy lining out in all five triumphs.

During those early successes, he also lined out with University College Cork and won a Cork SFC medal after a defeat of Avondhu in the 1960 final. Sheehy claimed a sixth Kerry SFC title in 1966 after beating East Kerry by 2-10 to 1-10 in that year's final.

== Inter-county career ==
Sheehy began his inter-county career with Kerry as a member of the minor hurling team in 1957. He made his debut with the Kerry senior football team in 0-12 to 0-06 defeat of Kildare in the National Football League in November 1961. A brief spell with the junior team was followed by being made captain of the senior team in 1962. Sheehy won his first Munster SFC medal after a defeat of Cork that year before captaining Kerry to the All-Ireland SFC title after a 1-12 to 1-06 defeat of Roscommon in the final. His brothers, Niall and Paudie, were also on the team.

Sheehy captained Kerry to a one-point defeat of Down in the 1963 National League home final. He claimed a second successive Munster SFC medal later that season, however, he subsequently lost his place on the starting fifteen. Sheehy came on a substitute in the 1963 All-Ireland semi-final defeat by Galway in what was his last game for the senior team. He returned to the junior team and ended his inter-county career by claiming a Munster JFC medal in 1965.

== Death ==
Sheehy died in Tralee on 31 May 2024, at the age of 85.

== Honours ==
John Mitchels

- Kerry Senior Football Championship: 1959, 1960, 1961, 1962, 1963, 1966

University College Cork

- Cork Senior Football Championship: 1960

Kerry

- All-Ireland Senior Football Championship: 1962 (c)
- Munster Senior Football Championship: 1962 (c), 1963
- Munster Junior Football Championship: 1965

Sporting positions
Preceded by Niall Sheehy	Kerry Senior Football Captain; 1962	Succeeded by Niall Sheehy
Achievements
Preceded by Paddy Doherty	All-Ireland Senior Football Final winning captain 1962	Succeeded by Des Foley
