= Paudie Sheehy =

Kerry Gaelic footballer

Personal information
- Born: 1932 Tralee, County Kerry
- Died: 5 August 1967 (aged 34–35) Tralee, County Kerry
- Occupation: Business executive

Sport
- Sport: Gaelic football
- Position: Forward
Club
- Years: Club
- 1950s–1960s: John Mitchels
Club titles
- Kerry titles: 6
Inter-county
Years	County	Apps (scores)
1951–1962	Kerry	35 (6–65)
Inter-county titles
- Munster titles: 7
- All-Irelands: 4 (1 as sub)
- NFL: 1
- All Stars: 0

Paudie Sheehy (1932–1967) was an Irish amateur sportsman and business executive. He played Gaelic football with John Mitchels and the Kerry county team from 1953 to 1962. He captained Kerry on two occasions. He was also a senior executive with the state-owned Irish Sugar and its affiliates, Erin Foods and Heinz-Erin Foods.

== Early life ==
Sheehy was the son of footballer John Joe and a brother of Niall, Brian and Seán Óg, all of whom also played senior football with Kerry.

== Sporting career ==
=== Youth ===
Sheehy first lined out for Kerry at a minor level in 1949. He won a Munster MFC medal after a final win over Cork. Sheehy's side later qualified for the All-Ireland MFC, where they faced Armagh. A 1–7 to 1–5 win saw the title go to Armagh.

Sheehy played with the Kerry minors again in 1950. He won a Munster MFC medal after a final win over Limerick. Sheehy's side later qualified for the All-Ireland MFC where they faced Wexford. A 3–06 to 1–4 win saw Sheehy pick up a winners medal.

He also played hurling with Kerry at a minor level.

=== Senior ===
Sheehy went straight into the Kerry squad in 1951 and made his debut in the Munster SFC final win over Cork. He was named at left half-forward for the All-Ireland SFC semi-final replay with Mayo, a game Kerry lost.

He played in all of Kerry's 1951–52 National Football League games scoring 1–15 in six games as Kerry lost the Division 3 final to Cork.

He later made his first Munster SFC start at left half-forward, when he scored four points in a 0–14 to 1–7 win over Waterford. He kept his place for the final against Cork at the Cork Athletic Grounds. However, the holders lost on a 0–11 to 0-2 scoreline. Despite failing to score in the final, he was Kerry's second-highest scorer in the championship.

During the 1952–53 National Football League, he played in all of Kerry's games as they lost in the semi-final to Cavan. He ended the campaign as Kerry's top scorer with 1-21. At just 21 years old, Sheehy was made the side's captain. He hit 3–3 in a 6–10 to 0-2 Munster SFC semi-final win over Clare. He scored one point in the Munster SFC final against Cork, and his side did enough to take the title on a 2–7 to 2-3 scoreline. This gave Sheehy his second Munster SFC medal. In the All-Ireland SFC semi-final Kerry faced Leinster champions Louth. Sheehy scored two points in a 3–6 to 1–6 win. Kerry faced Armagh in the final. However, a dispute arose over whether Sheehy would start in the decider. Things were made more complicated as Sheehy's father John Joe was one of the team's selectors. At the selection meeting before the game, John Joe excused himself when they reached Paudie's position; by the time he returned, his son had been dropped. Jas Murphy led Kerry to a seventeenth title on a 0–13 to 1-6 scoreline. Though he served as the side's captain at the start of the campaign and was the team's top scorer, Sheehy did not appear in the game.

Despite scoring in only two of the five games he played during the 1953–54 National Football League, he still finished as Kerry's third-highest scorer with 1-5.

He began the championship with two points in a 3–10 to 1-2 Munster SFC semi-final with over Waterford. He lined out in his fourth Munster SFC final when Kerry again faced Cork. Three points from Sheehy saw his side take the title on a 4–9 to 2-3 scoreline and a third Munster SFC medal for him. His contribution of 1–1 in the All-Ireland SFC semi-final with Galway contributed to his side's 2–6 to 1–6 win. Sheehy got his chance to line out in a senior final as Kerry squared off with Leinster champion Meath. However, he failed to score and Kerry lost on a 1–13 to 1-7 scoreline.

He played in all of Kerry's 1954–55 National Football League games, but his side failed to make the knockout stages.

For the second season in a row, Kerry beat Waterford in the Munster SFC. They played Cork again in the final. He hit five points in a 0–14 to 2–6 win and received a fourth Munster SFC medal. Kerry faced Cavan in the All-Ireland SFC semi-final. In a game where he failed to score, the sides ended level. In the replay, two points from Sheehy helped his side get the win at 4–7 to 0–5. Kerry qualified for a third consecutive All-Ireland SFC final. In Sheehy's second final Kerry faced the favorites, Dublin. Dublin had drawn attention by defeating the reigning champion Meath in the final of that year's Leinster SFC, in what was a twenty-point win. Sheehy managed only a single point, as Jim Brosnan scored two crucial second-half points. He had flown home from New York for the final, where he was studying medicine. After missing out on the 1953 win, Sheehy had his first All-Ireland SFC medal.

The next few seasons brought no success for Sheehy and Kerry. A final loss after a replay came in 1956. In 1957, Kerry suffered an unexpected loss to Waterford in the Munster SFC semi-final.

In 1958, Kerry returned to the Munster SFC final after a semi-final win over Tipperary. In the Munster SFC final, Kerry again faced Cork, a game in which a point from Sheehy helped his team to a fifth Munster SFC title in a 2–7 to 0-3 win. In the All-Ireland SFC semi-final, Sheehy faced Derry. Derry had won its first Ulster SFC a few weeks before and were underdogs going into the game. Despite two points from Sheehy, Kerry lost by a single point on a 2–6 to 2-5 scoreline.

During the 1958–59 National Football League, Sheehy played in and scored in all seven Kerry games, a total of 2–16, as they overcame Derry in the final to give Sheehy his first league winner's medal.

After overcoming Tipperary for the second year in a row it set up another Munster SFC final with Cork. Sheehy scored 1–1 in Killarney as a 2–15 to 2-8 took him to his sixth Munster SFC title. In the All-Ireland SFC semi-final, his three points helped his side take Dublin by a score of 1–10 to 2-5. Kerry did enough to take the title with 3–7 to 1-4. It was a second title for Sheehy as he was joined by his younger brother Niall.

In 1960, for the second time, Sheehy was named as Kerry captain. For the third year in a row Tipperary were overcome in a game where he scored four points, to set up a Munster SFC final with Waterford. He scored 1-4, a personal best in a Munster SFC final, and helped his side to a 3–15 to 0–8 win. It was Sheehy's seventh Munster SFC title and second as captain. In a repeat of the previous All-Ireland SFC final, Kerry overcame Galway by 1–8 to 0–8. In the All-Ireland SFC final Kerry faced first timers Down. Down secured a 2–10 to 0–8 win and placed Sheehy as an All-Ireland SFC runner-up for the second time.

In the 1960-61 National Football League, he scored 2–6 in six games up to the semi-final replay win over Roscommon. He played no part in that summer's championship.

In the twilight of his career he returned for the 1962 championship. In what was to be his last Munster SFC final at the Cork Athletic Grounds he won his eighth Munster SFC title. He hit two points as Kerry defeated Dublin in the All-Ireland SFC semi-final. In the All-Ireland SFC final against Roscommon, he again lined out with his younger brother Niall and another brother Seán Óg was the side's captain. In what was the first game to be broadcast live on television, Sheehy hit two points as he won a third and final All-Ireland SFC medal by a score of 1–12 to 1–6.

The 1962 All-Ireland SFC final was Sheehy's final game with Kerry. Between 1951 and 1962, he played 35 championship games scoring 6–56. He won eight Munster SFC titles, one National Football League title and three All-Ireland SFC titles.

=== College ===
During his college days, he played with University College Cork. He won two Sigerson Cup titles during his time with the Cork side in 1951–52 and again in 1952–53 as captain.

=== Club ===
Sheehy played with the John Mitchels club. He played in his first Kerry Senior Football Championship final in 1949 but was on the losing side to Killarney.

He was part of the lineup in a second final in 1951 in another Tralee/Killarney match. This time Sheehy faced Dick Fitzgeralds, but again lost.

They returned to the final again in 1952 when they faced the Kenmare divisional side. In the end, a 3–06 to 0–06 win brought the first title to Sheehy.

By the 1959 championship, he was joined by his younger brothers Niall, Seán Óg, and Brian. Mitchels returned to the final for the first time since 1952, where they faced the North Kerry divisional team, Feale Rangers. His brother Niall saved the Tralee side with a late goal and earned a 1–09 to 2–06 draw. The following April, Mitchels won out on a 3–09 to 1-10 scoreline. This gave Paudie Sheehy his second county title.

Mitchels were back in the final in 1960, and they again faced a divisional team, this time West Kerry. The sides ended level and a replay was needed for the second year in a row. Tralee won the replay on a scoreline of 1–11 to 0-03. It was his third medal, and he was team captain.

Sheehy played in the third final in a row and second in 1961, including the delayed 1960 final, in the first all-Tralee clash since 1936 with Kerins O'Rahilly's. A 2–09 to 0-08 score produced Sheehy's third title in a row and fourth overall.

The Mitchels again reached the final in 1962, and for the third time in four seasons, their opponents were a divisional team again facing Feale Rangers. As in 1960, the sides couldn't be separated, despite Mitchels lead going into added time, as a late score by Rangers saw the sides finish level on a 2–08 to 1-11 scoreline. In the replay, Sheehy and his team made history as the title came to Tralee for the fourth year in a row and Sheehy won his fifth medal.

In 1963, the Mitchels qualified for a fifth final in a row. They faced Kerins O'Rahilly's. A fifth title came after a 4–04 to 2–03 win. It was Sheehy's sixth and final medal - a record that stood until 2017.

== Business career ==
Paudie Sheehy was a top student at St Mary's CBS, Tralee and later at University College, Cork (UCC) where he took first-class honours and first place in his final B.Comm. examinations in 1954. After staying on at UCC as demonstrator for a year, he subsequently articled at a Limerick firm of auditors before qualifying as a chartered accountant in 1958. Thereafter he worked as accountant for the Mater Hospital Pools, a sports pools run to provide funds for the Mater Hospital in Dublin, Ford Motor Company of Cork and Liebherr, a German crane manufacturer that established a major plant in Killarney in 1957.

The turning point in Sheehy's career came after joining Irish Sugar in the early 1960s. The managing director of this state enterprise, Lt.-Gen. M.J. Costello, saw in his new hire something more than a mere accountant: Sheehy could extract the underlying business implications from the figures. On Costello's insistence, Sheehy was sent on senior executive courses to Harvard and Berkeley business schools. Economising on travel costs he bought a car to visit and study many businesses of interest across North America.

Such preparation stood Sheehy in good stead with both Irish Sugar and its new subsidiary, Erin Foods, an enterprise dreamed up by Costello to provide summer/fall employment for people in rural Ireland. Its operations and staffing schedule contrasted with that of the fall/winter sugar-beet factory operations in Tuam, Thurles, Mallow and Carlow. Factories were planned for Midleton and Skibbereen, County Cork and Glencolumbkille, County Donegal. After a period in internal audit, Sheehy was appointed secretary to both the Irish Sugar and Erin Foods boards. A secretary attended all board meetings even if not a director and contributed views regarding regulatory aspects of decisions. A number of people, previously appointed as secretary in Irish state organisations, were later appointed to the managing director role. Erin Foods offered small farmers an assured market and price for vegetable produce. Although economic production of vegetables would challenge the marginal farmers of the North and West of Ireland, Erin Foods laboratories' innovation in air-drying and freeze-drying processes was attracting the interest of international food groups. In the mid 1960s, Erin's new Managing Director, Tony O'Reilly, was concerned to stop heavy losses resulting from Erin's purchase of a UK distribution business. He sought a venture partner for marketing Erin produce overseas. To improve their cost base, O'Reilly and his senior management team, including financial controller, Vincent Ferguson, and general manager, Séamus Mac Giolla Ríogh, also pressed the Fianna Fáil government to remove Erin's obligation to buy vegetables uneconomically from Irish farmers. The latter was a necessary though politically controversial decision. This and a decision to sell bulk unbranded vegetables to European market consumers led to an agreement to form a partnership with the H.J. Heinz Company in 1967. Erin gained access to Heinz's distribution channels while Heinz obtained the benefit of Erin's vegetables supply, food research laboratories and technologies.

== Death and legacy ==
As Irish Sugar and Erin secretary, Sheehy collated for submission reports and projections on the Heinz partnership proposal for the government and shareholders. The first financial report since Erin's restructuring showed a turnaround in its performance and was submitted to the new Heinz-Erin board of directors before that year's a.g.m. in June 1967. At the same meeting Sheehy was formally appointed secretary of the new enterprise. Shortly afterwards he took a holiday in Kerry. On the following 5 August, Sheehy died unexpectedly during a stay at his parents' home in Tralee.

Sheehy's sudden death left local people in a state of shock. Earlier that year he played a charity Gaelic football game between the 1967 and 1955 Kerry teams. To one reporter his fitness seemed never in doubt due to years of fitting exercise into a busy work schedule. A heavy local attendance, augmented by numerous acquaintances from the worlds of sport and commerce, made his funeral on 6–7 August 1967 one of the largest seen in Tralee since Independence.

== Honours ==
=== College ===
University College Cork
- Sigerson Cup (2): 1951–52, 1952–53 (c)

=== Club ===
John Mitchels

- Kerry Senior Football Championship (6): 1952, 1959, 1960(c), 1961, 1962, 1963

=== County ===
Kerry

- Munster Senior Football Championship (8): 1951, 1953 (c), 1954, 1955, 1958, 1960 (c), 1961, 1962
- All-Ireland Senior Football Championship (3): 1955, 1959, 1962
- National Football League (1) 1959
- Munster Minor Football Championship (2) 1949, 1950
- All-Ireland Minor Football Championship (1) 1950

Sporting positions
Preceded by Tadhg Lyne	Kerry Senior Football Captain; 1953	Succeeded by Jas Murphy
Preceded by Mick O'Connell	Kerry Senior Football Captain; 1960	Succeeded by Niall Sheehy
