= Timothy O'Sullivan =

Timothy O'Sullivan may refer to:

- Timothy H. O'Sullivan (c. 1840–1882), American photographer known for his work on the American Civil War and the Western United States
- Timothy O'Sullivan (Fianna Fáil politician) (1899–1971), Irish Fianna Fáil politician, TD for Cork West 1937–1954, Senator 1954–1969
- Timothy O'Sullivan (Irish nationalist politician) (1879–1950), Member of Parliament for East Kerry 1910–1918
- Timmy O'Sullivan (1939–1984), Irish Gaelic footballer
