= Denis O'Connell =

Denis O'Connell may refer to:

- Denis J. O'Connell, bishop
- Denis O'Connell (Australian politician), Mayor of Gold Coast
- Denis O'Connell (Gaelic footballer), see John Joe Sheehy
