= John Mitchels GAA (Kerry) =

Gaelic games club in County Kerry, Ireland

- Na Mistéalaigh
- Founded: 1927
- County: Kerry
- Colours: Green then yellow then green
- Grounds: Ballyseedy
- Coordinates: 52°14′55.32″N 9°40′43.80″W

Playing kits
Standard colours

Senior Club Championships
	All Ireland	Munster champions	Kerry champions
Football:	-	-	9

John Mitchels GAA are a Gaelic Athletic Association club based in Tralee, County Kerry, Ireland. They are based in the Camp area just outside of Tralee.

== Club history ==
Before 1927 only one team represented Tralee in the Kerry Senior Football County Championship and they were Tralee John Mitchels. As this team was so successful the Kerry County Board requested that it should be divided into three individual teams representing, Boherbee, Rock St. and Strand St, this is where the John Mitchels, Austin Stacks and Kerins O'Rahilly's clubs came from. The John Mitchels club since 1927 are thought to be one of the most successful clubs in Kerry.

Between 1959 and 1963 they won five Senior Football titles in a row, the only team to do so in the history of the Kerry County Championship. John Mitchels Club are holders of 10 Senior, 1 U-21 and 3 Minor County Championships.

They have also played in 3 Kerry Senior Club Hurling Championship finals in 1927 and 1928 losing both to Austin Stacks and 1936 they lost to St. Brendan's, Ardfert.

Success has been limited of late, although John Mitchels player Brien Costello, captained Tralee CBS to Munster Colleges Senior 'A' Corn Uí Mhuirí Glory and in the All-Ireland Colleges Hogan Cup Final loss to Omagh CBS in 2007. In 2008 for the first time in the club's long history they dropped out of the Senior County Championship to the Kerry Intermediate Football Championship.

In 2014, the club moved to a new ground outside of Tralee, in Ballyseedy.

== Honours ==
Kerry Senior Football Championship: 10

- 1929, 1937, 1947, 1952, 1959, 1960, 1961, 1962, 1963, 1966

Team Captains

1929 – John Joe Sheehy (Captain),

1937 – Bill Kinnerk (Captain),

1947 – Joe Keohane (Captain),

1952 – Michéal "Haulie" Lynch (Captain),

1959 – Niall Sheehy (Captain),

1960 – Paudie Sheehy (Captain),

1961 – Fred Lynch (Captain),

1962 – Teddy O’Dowd (Captain),

1963 – Brian Sheehy (Captain),

1966 – Seamus Roche (Captain)

Finalists (6) – 1931, 1941, 1942, 1946, 1949, 1989

Semi-finals (11) – 1928, 1932, 1933, 1934, 1938, 1940, 1944, 1954, 1955, 1969, 1991

Munster Senior Club Football Championship Finalists (1) 1967

Kerry Under 21 Football Championship: 1

- 1983

Captain

1983 – Jim O’Donnell,

Finalists (2) – 1985, 1995

Kerry Minor Football Championship: 3

- 1954, 1958, 1961

Team Captains

1954 – Fred Lynch (Captain),

1958 – Philo. Healy (Captain),

1961 – Jimmy O’Mahony (Captain)

John Mitchels Kerry Captains to win the All- Ireland

Senior

1909 – Tom Costelloe,

1926 – John Joe Sheehy,

1930 – John Joe Sheehy,

1962 – Sean Og Sheehy,

Junior

2015 – Alan O'Donoghue

Minor

1931 – Jimmy O’Gorman

1962 – Jimmy O’Mahony,

U-21

1962 – Dom O'Donnell

1964 – Dom O'Donnell

48 players wore the Kerry jersey in Championship (1928–2010) and National League (1950–2014)

PAUDIE SHEEHY
87 Senior Appearances
Career: 1949 – 1961
Munster Senior Medals: 8
All-Ireland Senior Medals: 4
National Football League Medals: 2
Munster Minor Medals: 2
All-Ireland Minor Medals: 1
Senior Championship Appearances: 35
Senior League Appearances: 52
Scored: 6–56 in Senior Championship. 9–88 in Senior League.

NIALL SHEEHY (SNR)
67 Senior Appearances 
Career: 1958 – 1965
Munster Senior Medals: 6
All-Ireland Senior Medals: 2
National Football leagues: 3
Munster Junior Medals: 1 (Hurling)
All-Ireland Junior Medals: 1(Hurling)
Championship Appearances: 26
League Appearances: 41
Scored: 1–2 in League.

ANTHONY GLEESON
45 Senior Appearances 
Career: 1989 – 1996
Senior Championship Appearances: 10
Senior League Appearances: 35
Munster U-21 Medals: 1
Scored: 0–2 in League.

JOE KEOHANE 
44 Senior Appearances 
Career: 1936 – 1948 
Munster Senior Medals: 10
All-Ireland Senior Medals: 5
Championship Appearances: 44
Scored:

MICK MORRIS
43 Senior Appearances 
Career: 1963 – 1969 
Munster Senior Medals: 3
All-Ireland Senior Medals: 1
National Football League Medals: 2
Munster Junior Medals: 1
All-Ireland Junior Medals: 1
Munster U-21 Medals: 1
All-Ireland U-21 Medals: 1
Senior Championship Appearances: 16
Senior League Appearances: 27
Scored:

TIMMY DOWD
43 Senior Appearances 
Career: 1980 – 1987 
Munster Senior Medals: 3
All-Ireland Senior Medals: 3
National Football League Medals: 1
Munster Minor Medals: 1
All-Ireland Minor Medals: 1
Senior Championship Appearances: 12
Senior League Appearances: 31
Scored: 1–11 in Championship. 3–22 in League.

JOHN JOE SHEEHY (SNR)
37 Senior Appearances 
Career: 1919 – 1930 
Munster Senior Medals: 6
All-Ireland Senior Medals: 4
Nation Football League Medals: 2
Senior Championship Appearances: 37
Scored: 4–22 in Championship.

JOHN HIGGINS
35 Senior Appearances 
Career: 1983 – 1987
Munster Senior Medals: 3 
All-Ireland Senior Medals: 3
National Football Medals: 1
Munster U-21 Medals: 1
Senior Championship Appearances: 5
Senior League Appearances: 30
Scored:

TADGH HEALY
34 Senior Appearances 
Career: 1937 – 1945 
Munster Senior Medals: 4
All-Ireland Senior Medals: 4
Senior Championship Appearances: 27
Senior League Appearances: 7
Scored: 0–1 in Championship. 0–2 in League.

WILLIAM “Bruddy” O’DONNELL
23 Senior Appearances 
Career: 1941 – 1951 
Munster Senior Medals: 3
All-Ireland Senior Medals: 1
Munster Junior Medals: 1
All-Ireland Junior Medals: 1
Senior Championship Appearances: 18
Senior League Appearances: 5
Scored: 8–23 in Championship. 1–8 in League.

SEANIE BURROWS
22 Senior Appearances 
Career: 1965 – 1968
Munster Senior Medals: 2
Munster U-21 Medals: 3
All-Ireland U-21 Medals: 1
Munster Minor Medals: 2
All-Ireland Minor Medals: 2
Senior Championship Appearances: 10
Senior League Appearances: 12
Scored: 2–1 in League.

GARRY O’MAHONY
21 Senior Appearances 
Career: 1954 – 1956 
Munster Senior Medals:
All-Ireland Senior Medals: 1
Munster Junior Medals: 1
All-Ireland Junior Medals: 1
Senior Championship Appearances: 7
Senior League Appearances: 14
Scored:

PADDY WHITTY
19 Senior Appearances 
Career: 1928 – 1936
Munster Senior Medals: 4
All-Ireland Senior Medals: 2
National Football League Medals: 4
Munster Junior Medals: 1
Senior Championship Appearances: 19
Scored: 0–6 in Championship.

BILL KINNERK
19 Senior Appearances 
Career: 1928 – 1938
Munster Senior Medals: 5
All-Ireland Senior Medals: 2 
National Football League Medals: 4
Munster Junior Medals: 2
All Ireland Junior Medals: 1
Senior Championship Appearances: 19
Scored:

CON GEANEY
15 Senior Appearances 
Career: 1931 – 1938 
Munster Senior Medals: 5
All-Ireland Senior Medals: 3
National Football League Medals: 2
Senior Championship Appearances: 15
Scored: 2–9 in Championship.

SEAN-ÓG SHEEHY
14 Senior Appearances 
Career: 1962 – 1963 
Munster Senior Medals: 2
All-Ireland Senior Medals: 1
National Football League Medals: 1
Munster Junior Medals: 1
Senior Championship Appearances: 7
Senior League Appearances: 7
Scored: 1–0 in Championship. 0–4 in League.

DOM O’DONNELL
12 Senior Appearances 
Career: 1962 – 1969 
Munster Senior Medals: 1
All-Ireland Senior Medals: 1
National Football League Medals: 2
Munster Junior Medals: 2
All-Ireland Junior Medals: 1
Munster U-21 Medals: 2
All-Ireland U-21 Medals: 1
Senior Championship Appearances: 5
Senior League Appearances: 7
Scored: 4–1 in Championship. 2–4 in League.

DERRY O’SHEA
11 Senior Appearances 
Career: 1963 – 1966
Munster Senior Medals: 1
National Football League Medals: 1
Munster Junior Medals: 2
All-Ireland Junior Medals: 1
Munster U-21 Medals: 1
All-Ireland U-21 Medals: 1
Munster Minor Medals: 1
All-Ireland Minor Medals: 1
Senior Championship Appearances: 5
Senior League Appearances: 6
Scored: 3–5 in Championship. 1–3 in League.

BRIAN SHEEHY
11 Senior Appearances 
Career: 1959 – 1961
Munster Senior Medals: 1
National Football League Medals: 2
Munster Junior Medals: 4
All-Ireland Junior Medals: 1
Senior Championship Appearances: 3
Senior League Appearances: 8
Scored: 1–0 in Championship. 3–3 in League.

DONAL MC EVOY
11 Senior Appearances 
Career: 1988 – 1988
Senior Championship Appearances: 1
Senior League Appearances: 10
Scored: 1–1 in Championship. 1–6 in League. 
Munster u-21 medals: 2

JOHNNY RIORDAN
10 Senior Appearances 
Career: 1928 – 1931
Munster Senior Medals: 5
All-Ireland Senior Medals: 4
National Football League Medals: 3
Munster Junior Medals: 1
All-Ireland Junior Medals: 1
Senior Championship Appearances: 10
Scored:

TEDDY DOWD
10 Senior Appearances 
Career: 1961 – 1961
Munster Senior Medals: 1
National Football League Medals: 1
Munster Junior Medals: 3
All-Ireland Junior Medals: 1
Munster Minor Medals: 1
Senior Championship Appearances: 3
Senior League Appearances: 7
Scored: 0–1 in Championship. 3–1 in League.

FRANK O’KEEFFE
9 Senior Appearances 
Career: 1946 – 1950 
Munster Senior Medals: 3
All-Ireland Senior Medals: 1
Munster Junior Medals: 1
Senior Championship Appearances: 7
Senior League Appearances: 2
Scored: 5–1 in Championship. 1–0 in League. 

 ALAN CONWAY
8 Senior Appearances 
Career: 1961 – 1962
National Football League Medals: 1
Munster Junior Medals: 1
Munster Minor Medals: 2
Senior Championship Appearances: 1
Senior League Appearances: 7
Scored:

SEAMUS ROCHE
7 Senior Appearances 
Career: 1962 – 1963 
Munster Senior Medals:
All-Ireland Senior Medals: 1
Senior Championship Appearances: 3
National Football League Medals: 1
Munster U-21 Medals: 1
Senior League Appearances: 4
Scored: 1–0 in Championship. 1–0 in League.

JOHN "Thorney" O’SHEA
7 Senior Appearances 
Career: 1965 – 1967
Munster Junior Medals: 1
Senior Championship Appearances: 3
Senior League Appearances: 4
Scored: 0–10 in Championship. 0–4 in League.

JOHN JOE SHEEHY (JNR)
5 Senior Appearances 
Career: 1988 – 1988
Senior League Appearances: 5
Scored:

Jackie Ryan
4 Senior Appearances
Career: 1924 – 1934
Munster Senior Medals: 2
All-Ireland Medals: 6
National Football League Medals: 4
Championship Appearances: 4
Scored: 0–6 in Championship.

BRENDAN GALVIN
4 Senior Appearances 
Career: 1952 – 1952
Munster Junior Medals: 2
All-Ireland Junior Medals: 1
Munster Minor Medals: 2
All-Ireland Minor Medals: 1
Senior Championship Appearances: 1
Senior League Appearances: 3
Scored: 0–1 in Championship. 1–1 in League.

MICHEAL “Haulie” LYNCH
4 Senior Appearances 
Career: 1953 – 1953
Munster Junior Medals: 1
All-Ireland Junior Medals: 1
Munster Minor Medals: 2
All-Ireland Minor Medals: 1
Senior League Appearances: 4
Scored:

TOMMY DOWLING
3 Senior Appearances 
Career: 1950 – 1950
Senior Championship Appearances: 1
Senior League Appearances: 2
Scored:

HARRY BOURKE
3 Senior Appearances 
Career: 1963 – 1967 
National Football League Medals: 1
Munster Junior Medals: 1
All-Ireland Junior Medals: 1
Senior League Appearances: 3
Scored:

EDDIE DUNNE
3 Senior Appearances 
Career: 1944 – 1945
Munster Junior Medals: 1
Senior Championship Appearances: 3
Scored: 2–2 in Championship.

TED FITZGERALD
3 Senior Appearances 
Senior Career: 1967 – 1967 
Munster Junior Medals: 1
All-Ireland Junior Medals: 1 
Munster U-21 Medals: 1
All-Ireland U-21 Medals: 1
Munster Minor Medals: 1
All-Ireland Minor Medals: 1
Senior League Appearances: 3
Scored:

JOHN “Cinders”s O’CONNOR
2 Senior Appearances 
Career: 1928 – 1933 
Munster Senior Medals: 1
All-Ireland Senior Medals: 1
National Football League Medals: 4
Senior Championship Appearances: 2
Scored: 1–0 in Championship.

MICHEAL Ó’RUAIRC
2 Senior Appearances 
Career: 1929 – 1930 
Munster Senior Medals: 2
All-Ireland Medals: 2 
National Football League Medals: 1
Munster Junior Medals: 2
All-Ireland Junior Medals: 1
Championship Appearances: 2
Scored: 1–1 in Championship.

TOMMY MURPHY
2 Senior Appearances 
Career: 1937 – 1938
Senior Championship Appearances: 2
Scored:

EUGENE POWELL
2 Senior Appearances 
Career: 1938 – 1938
Munster Junior Medals: 1
All-Ireland Junior Medals: 1
Senior Championship Appearances: 2
Scored: 0–3 in Championship.

PADDY O’DONOGHUE
2 Senior Appearances 
Career: 1942 – 1944
senior Championship Appearances: 2
Scored: 2–1 in Championship.

D J MC MAHON
2 Senior Appearances 
Career: 1950 – 1950
Senior Championship Appearances: 2
Scored: 1–0 in Championship.

JOHN DOWD
2 Senior Appearances
Career: 1983 – 1983
Senior League Appearances: 2

RORY KILGALLEN
2 Senior Appearances
Career: 1984 – 1984
Senior League Appearances: 2
National Football League Medals: 1
Munster U-21 Medals; 1
Scored:

BRENDAN O’MAHONY
2 Senior Appearance 
Career: 2004 – 2014
Senior League Appearances: 1
Mc Grath Cup Appearances: 1

MICHAEL O’GORMAN
1 Senior Appearance
Career: 1937 – 1937 
Munster Senior Medals: 1
All-Ireland Medals: 1
Championship Appearances: 1
Scored: 2–1 in Championship.

JOHN MC CARTHY
1 Senior Appearance 
Career: 1939 – 1939
Munster Senior Medals: 1
All-Ireland Senior Medals: 1

JAMES PIERCE
I Senior appearance
Career; 1941
Munster Senior Medals: 1
All-Ireland Senior Medals: 1

CARL O’SULLIVAN
1 Senior Appearance 
Career: 1946 – 1946
Munster Senior Medals: 1
All-Ireland Senior Medals: 1
Championship Appearances: 1

NICHOLAS O’DONOGHUE
1 Senior Appearance 
Career: 1946 – 1946
Munster Senior Medals: 1
All-Ireland Senior Medals: 1
Championship Appearances: 1

== Notable players ==
- Anthony Gleeson Dual player with Kerry.
- Joe Keohane Five time All-Ireland Senior Football Championship winner and Kerry captain. Also full-back position on the Football Team of the Millennium.
- Mick Morris All-Ireland Senior Football Championship winner.
- Dom O'Donnell 1964 All-Ireland Under 21 winning captain.
- Timmy O'Dowd Three time All-Ireland Senior Football Championship winner.
- John Joe Sheehy 1926 All-Ireland Senior Football Championship and 1930 All-Ireland Senior Football Championship winning captain. winning captain.
- Niall Sheehy Two time All-Ireland Senior Football Championship winner and Kerry captain. All-Ireland Junior Hurling Championship winner.
- Paudie Sheehy Three time All-Ireland Senior Football Championship winner and Kerry captain.
- Seán Óg Sheehy 1962 All-Ireland Senior Football Championship winning captain.
- Dom O'Donnell First ever All-Ireland Under-21 Football Championship winning captain 1964.
- Paddy Whitty Four time All-Ireland Senior Football Championship winner.
- Jimmy O’Gorman 1931 All-Ireland Minor Football Championship winning captain.
- Jimmy O’Mahony 1961 All-Ireland Minor Football Championship winning captain.
- Alan O'Donoghue 2015 All-Ireland Junior Football Championship winning captain.
