= Anthony Gleeson =

Irish hurler and Gaelic footballer

Personal information
- Born: Tralee, County Kerry

Sport
- Sport: Gaelic football
- Position: Full Back
Club
- Years: Club
- 1980s–2000s: John Mitchels
Inter-county
Years	County	Apps (scores)
1989–1996	Kerry	10
Inter-county titles
- Munster titles: 0
- All-Irelands: 0
- NFL: 0

Anthony Gleeson was a dual player from Tralee, County Kerry. He played at full back for most of his career. Gleeson was unlucky not to have won any senior honors with Kerry, he missed out on the Munster Championship win in 1991 and despite playing in the first round in 1996 did not play another game and therefore did not receive a Munster medal. He did win a Munster Under 21 Championship in 1988. He also played underage hurling with Kerry in the late 80's, he was captain of the team in 1987 when they won the Leinster Minor B Championship. He gave up hurling at a young age to focus on football. He also played with the Kerry Vocational Schools team in the late 80's winning 2 All-Ireland Vocational Schools Championships in 1986 and 1987.

At club level he played football with John Mitchels. He had little success with the club failing to win a County Championship, he did however played in the 1989 final when John Mitchels were beaten by Laune Rangers. He played hurling with Austin Stacks and won a County Minor Championship with them in 1986. He also played with Dublin club St Vincents.

Sporting positions
Preceded by Darren Aherne	Kerry Senior Football Captain; 1995	Succeeded by Morgan Nix
