= Morgan Nix =

Irish Gaelic footballer

Personal information
- Native name: Morgáin Mac Niocais (Irish)
- Born: 1968 (age 57–58) County Limerick
- Occupation: industrial painter
- Height: 6 ft 0 in (183 cm)

Sport
- Sport: Gaelic football
- Position: Left wing-back
Club
- Years: Club
- 1980s-2000s: Kerins O'Rahilly's
Club titles
- Kerry titles: 1
Inter-county
Years	County	Apps (scores)
1988-1995	Kerry	10
Inter-county titles
- Munster titles: 1
- All-Irelands: 0
- NFL: 0
- All Stars: 0

Morgan Nix (born 1968) is an Irish former sportsperson. He played Gaelic football with his local club Kerins O'Rahilly's and was a member of the Kerry senior inter-county team between 1988 and 1995.

Sporting positions
Preceded by Anthony Gleeson	Kerry Senior Football Captain; 1995	Succeeded by Billy O'Shea
