= Timmy O'Dowd =

Irish Gaelic footballer

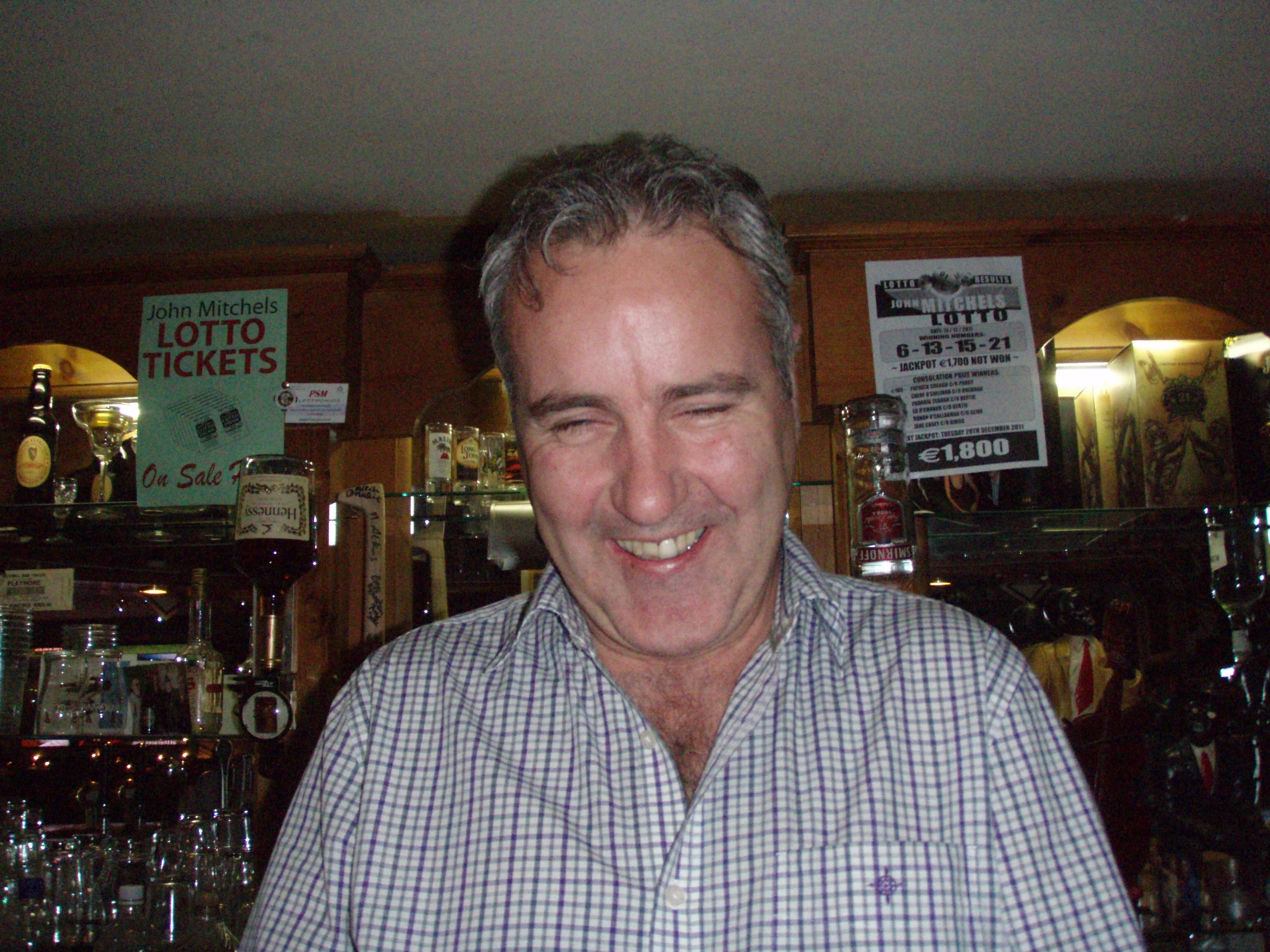

Personal information
- Native name: Tadhg Ó Dúda (Irish)
- Nickname: Dowdie
- Born: 1963 (age 62–63) Tralee, County Kerry, Ireland
- Occupation: Publican
- Height: 5 ft 9 in (175 cm)

Sport
- Sport: Gaelic football
- Position: Right wing-forward
Clubs
- Years: Club
- John Mitchels; Thomas Davis
Club titles
- Kerry titles: 0
Inter-county*
Years	County	Apps (scores)
1983-1988	Kerry	14 (1-11)
Inter-county titles
- Munster titles: 3
- All-Irelands: 3
- NFL: 1
- All Stars: 0
- *Inter County team apps and scores correct as of 13:15, 24 September 2011.

Timothy O'Dowd (born 1963) is an Irish retired Gaelic footballer. His league and championship career with the Kerry senior team spanned six seasons from 1983 to 1988.

Born in Tralee, County Kerry, O'Dowd was born into a strong Gaelic football family. His father, Tom, enjoyed a distinguished career with the John Mitchels club while he also played for Kerry at minor, junior and senior levels.

O'Dowd first appeared for the John Mitchels club at underage levels, winning a county under-21 championship medal in 1983. He had made his senior debut as a fifteen year-old in 1978, however, he enjoyed little success in this grade. O'Dowd also lined out with the Thomas Davis club in Dublin.

O'Dowd made his debut on the inter-county scene at the age of sixteen when he was picked on the Kerry minor team. He enjoyed two championship seasons with the minor team, winning an All-Ireland medal in 1980. O'Dowd made his senior debut during the 1982-83 league. Over the course of the next five seasons, he won three All-Ireland medals in-a-row from 1984 to 1986. O'Dowd also won three Munster medals and one National Football League medal. He played his last game for Kerry in February 1988.

O'Dowd was chosen on the Munster inter-provincial team in 1986, however, he ended his career without a Railway Cup medal.

== Career statistics ==
Team	Season	National League			Munster		All-Ireland		Total	
Team	Season	Division	Apps	Score	Apps	Score	Apps	Score	Apps	Score
Kerry	1982-83	Division 1	1	0-00	0	0-00	0	0-00	1	0-00
Kerry	1983-84	Division 1	8	2-10	1	0-04	1	0-00	10	2-14
Kerry	1984-85	Division 1	6	0-03	2	0-02	3	1-02	11	1-07
Kerry	1985-86	Division 1	4	0-04	2	0-01	2	0-02	8	0-07
Kerry	1986-87	Division 1	10	1-04	3	0-00	0	0-00	13	1-04
Kerry	1987-88	Division 1	2	0-01	0	0-00	0	0-00	2	0-1
Total			31	3-22	8	0-07	6	1-04	45	4-33
