= Dom O'Donnell =

Irish Gaelic footballer

Personal information
- Born: Tralee, County Kerry

Sport
- Sport: Gaelic football
- Position: Corner Forward
Club
- Years: Club
- 1950s-1960s: John Mitchels
Club titles
- Kerry titles: 6
Inter-county
Years	County	Apps (scores)
1964-1970	Kerry	5 (4-01)
Inter-county titles
- Munster titles: 1
- All-Irelands: 0
- NFL: 1

Dom O'Donnell was a Gaelic footballer from Tralee, County Kerry. He played Gaelic football with his local club John Mitchels, and was a member of the Kerry senior inter-county team during the 1960s. He won Munster Championship medals in 1962 and 1964. In 1964, he also won an All Ireland Under 21 medal as captain of the winning team.

At club level, O'Donnell was part of the famed John Mitchels team of the late 1950s and 1960s, winning six Kerry Senior Football Championships (five in a row from 1959 to 1963 and again in 1966).

Achievements
Preceded by New competition	All-Ireland Under-21 Football Final winning captain 1964	Succeeded by Pat Dunney
