= Glenbeigh-Glencar GAA =

Gaelic games club in County Kerry, Ireland

Glenbeigh/Glencar G.A.A Club
- Cumann Lúchtchleas Gael; Gleann Beithe agus Gleann Charthaigh
- County: Kerry
- Colours: Red and Black
- Grounds: Paírc na nGael
- Coordinates: 52°03′55.38″N 9°55′51.79″W

Playing kits
Standard colours

Glenbeigh/Glencar G.A.A Club is a Gaelic Athletic Association club from the small village of Glenbeigh, near Killorglin in County Kerry.

== History ==
There are no records of a GAA club in Glenbeigh or Glencar before a mention in 1940 but it is known that football was played in both areas down through the years, and matches took place regularly between teams in different regions of the parish and also with outside opposition. Before the Mid Kerry Board was founded in 1947, Glenbeigh was attached to the East Kerry Board. Glenbeigh won the East Kerry Junior Championship in 1943. Glenbeigh joined the East Kerry board in 1949. Glenbeigh won the Mid Kerry Senior Football Championship of 1956 when they defeated Keel in the final. That year they also won the Laune Rangers Cup. In 1956 the Glenbeigh Minor team also won the Mid Kerry title. Glenbeigh lost the 1957 Mid Kerry Senior Football Championship final versus Milltown, but defeated the same team in that year's Laune Rangers Cup final. Glenbeigh won the 1964 Mid Kerry Senior Football Championship final versus Laune Rangers. Glenbeigh provided quite a few players to the Mid Kerry team that won the Kerry Senior Football Championship in 1969 and 1971. Glenbeigh won the Mid Kerry Senior Football Championship in 1974 and the Mid Kerry League in 1968, 1969 and 1970. The O'Sullivan Cup was won for the first time in 1971 and in 1974 the Mid Kerry Senior Football Championship. In 1975 they won both the Mid Kerry League and Championship and also the O'Sullivan Cup. In the eighties the Club continued to be successful winning the Mid Kerry League in 1982 and 1983 along with success in the O'Sullivan Cup in 1981, 1982,1984, 1985 and 1986. Glenbeigh lost the County League Division 1 final in 1982. On 3 August 1986 Glenbeigh/Glencar opened Paírc na nGael. Prior to this the club had played its home games on the pitch in Rossbeigh. Kerry beat Cork on the first game on the new pitch. In 1992 Mid Kerry won the Kerry Senior Football Championship for the third time, defeating St. Brendan's by 3-09 to 1-10.

== Achievements ==
- All-Ireland Junior Club Football Championship (1) 2017
- Munster Junior Club Football Championship (1) 2016
- Kerry Novice Football Championship Winner (1) 2004
- Kerry Premier Junior Football Championship Winner (1) 2016 Runner-Up 2015
- Mid Kerry Senior Football Championship Winner (9) 1949, 1956, 1964, 1974, 1975, 1979, 2011, 2013, 2015, 2018

== Notable players ==
- Darran O'Sullivan Four time All-Ireland Senior Football Championship winner, 2009 All-Ireland Senior Football Championship winning captain, All-Star winner.
- Pat Griffin Two time All-Ireland Senior Football Championship winner.
- Aidan O'Shea All-Ireland Senior Football Championship winner. 2017 All-Ireland Junior Club Football Championship winning manager.
- Jimmy Lucey All-Ireland Senior Football Championship winner.
- Noel Lucey All-Ireland Senior Football Championship winner.
- Jerry O'Riordan All-Ireland Senior Football Championship winner.
- Vincent Lucey
