= Tony Whyte =

Roscommon Gaelic footballer (1939–2024

Personal information
- Native name: Antóin de Faoite (Irish)
- Born: 1939 Ballydangan, County Roscommon, Ireland
- Died: 19 April 2024 (aged 84) Ballinasloe, County Galway, Ireland
- Occupation: Hospital Manager
- Height: 5 ft 9 in (175 cm)

Sport
- Sport: Gaelic football
- Position: Left wing-forward
Club
- Years: Club
- 1955–1979: Clann na nGael
Club titles
- Roscommon titles: 6
Inter-county
- Years: County
- 1957–1970: Roscommon
Inter-county titles
- Connacht titles: 2
- All-Irelands: 0
- NFL: 0
- All Stars: 0

Anthony Whyte (1939 – 19 April 2024) was an Irish Gaelic football player, manager and administrator. He played at club level with Clann na nGael and at inter-county level with the Roscommon senior football team.

== Playing career ==
Whyte first played Gaelic football during his schooldays at Ardkeenan National School and St Joseph's College, Garbally. He was 15-years-old when he made his adult club debut with Clann na nGael, winning the McCrann Cup. During a 25-year club career, Whyte won six Roscommon SFC titles, three as captain in 1961, 1966 and 1970 and three as player–trainer in 1976, 1977 and 1979.

At inter-county level, Whyte sent three consecutive years as a minor with Roscommon. He immediately progressed to the senior team, but also won a Connacht JFC medal in 1959. Whyte won consecutive Connacht SFC medals in 1961 and 1962, as well as lining out at left wing-forward in the 1962 All-Ireland SFC final defeat by Kerry. He retired from the inter-county scene in 1970.

== Managerial career ==
Whyte trained Clann na nGael teams from juvenile to senior over a lengthy career. He was player–trainer for the Roscommon SFC titles in 1976, 1977 and 1979. Whyte managed the team to Connacht Club SFC titles in 1982 and 1984, while he was also in charge for the 1983 All-Ireland Club SFC final defeat by Portlaoise.

At inter-county level, Whyte also trained and managed the Roscommon senior team, guiding them to consecutive Connacht SFC titles in 1977 and 1978.

== Death ==
Whyte died at Portiuncula University Hospital in Ballinasloe on 19 April 2024, at the age of 84.

== Honours ==
=== Player ===
St Peter's

- Roscommon Minor Football Championship: 1957

Clann na nGael

- Roscommon Senior Football Championship: 1961 (c), 1966 (c), 1970 (c), 1976, 1977, 1979

Roscommon

- Connacht Senior Football Championship: 1961, 1962
- Connacht Junior Football Championship: 1959

=== Management ===
Clann na nGael

- Connacht Senior Club Football Championship: 1982, 1984
- Roscommon Senior Football Championship: 1976, 1977, 1979, 1982, 1984

Roscommon

- Connacht Senior Football Championship: 1977, 1978
