= Mid Kerry Senior Football Championship =

Annual Gaelic football competition

- Irish: Craobh Sinsear Peile Chiarraí Lár
- Code: Gaelic football
- Founded: 1947
- Region: Mid Kerry (GAA)
- Trophy: Michael O'Connor Memorial Cup
- No. of teams: 6
- Title holders: Laune Rangers (30th title)
- First winner: Milltown/Castlemaine
- Most titles: Laune Rangers (30 titles)
- Sponsors: Bunker's Bar and Restaurant

The Mid Kerry Senior Football Championship is a Gaelic football competition for GAA clubs affiliated to the Mid Kerry Division of Kerry.

The first championship was held in 1947 when the Mid-Kerry Football Board was formed. It was won by Milltown/Castlemaine. Laune Rangers have been the most successful team in the championship, winning 30 titles.

== Finals ==
Year	Winner	Score	Opponent	Score
2026	Laune Rangers	2–18	Beaufort	1–17
2025	Beaufort	0-13	Milltown/Castlemaine	0-12
2024	Beaufort	1-10	Keel	0-12
2023	Laune Rangers	0-12	Keel	1-06
2022	Beaufort	1-11	Milltown/Castlemaine	0-09
2021	Beaufort	1-11	Laune Rangers	0-09
2020	No competition due to COVID-19 Pandemic			
2019	Milltown/Castlemaine	2-11	Laune Rangers	0-16
2018	Glenbeigh-Glencar	0-17	Laune Rangers	1-12
2017	Beaufort	1-14	Glenbeigh-Glencar	0-14
2016	Beaufort	2-08	Milltown/Castlemaine	1-10
2015	Glenbeigh-Glencar	1-10	Milltown/Castlemaine	1-06
2014	Milltown/Castlemaine	1-11	Keel	0-06
2013	Glenbeigh-Glencar	5-12	Laune Rangers	0-09
2012	Milltown/Castlemaine		Laune Rangers	
2011	Glenbeigh-Glencar	1-10	Laune Rangers	0-11
2010	Milltown/Castlemaine		Keel	
2009	Keel		Milltown/Castlemaine	
2008	Milltown/Castlemaine		Laune Rangers	
2007	Milltown/Castlemaine	2-12	Beaufort	0-03
2006	Laune Rangers	2-11	Glenbeigh-Glencar	2-03
2005	Laune Rangers	3-07	Milltown/Castlemaine	1-11
2004	Laune Rangers	1-12	Milltown/Castlemaine	1-11
2003	Laune Rangers	1-10	Beaufort	0-10
2002	Laune Rangers	0-11	Beaufort	0-08
2001	Milltown/Castlemaine	0-09	Laune Rangers	0-08
2000	Laune Rangers	2-09	Beaufort	0-06
1999	Laune Rangers	1-09	Beaufort	1-07
1998	Beaufort	0-09	Milltown/Castlemaine	1-04
1997	Laune Rangers	0-11	Milltown/Castlemaine	0-09
1996	Laune Rangers	3-10	Glenbeigh-Glencar	2-08
1995	Laune Rangers	0-13	Beaufort	1-05
1994	Laune Rangers	0-09	Milltown/Castlemaine	0-04
1993	Laune Rangers	1-11	Milltown/Castlemaine	0-05
1992	Laune Rangers	1-09	Beaufort	1-04
1991	Laune Rangers	1-11	Milltown/Castlemaine	1-09
1990	Laune Rangers	1-10	Milltown/Castlemaine	1-08
1989	Milltown/Castlemaine	0-9	Beaufort	0-05
1988	Laune Rangers	3-18	Glenbeigh-Glencar	0-05
1987	Laune Rangers	0-07, 1-09 (R)	Milltown/Castlemaine	0-07, 1-05 (R)
1986	Laune Rangers	0-14	Milltown/Castlemaine	2-07
1985	Laune Rangers	1-08	Keel	1-06
1984	Laune Rangers	2-04	Beaufort	0-09
1983	Laune Rangers	2-06	Glenbeigh-Glencar	0-01
1982	Beaufort	2-04	Glenbeigh-Glencar	0-06
1981	Keel	1-06	Laune Rangers	1-03
1980	Beaufort		Glenbeigh-Glencar	
1979	Beaufort	1-13	Keel	1-04
1978	Beaufort			
1977	Beaufort	2-10	Glenbeigh-Glencar	1-11
1976	Beaufort	3-06	Laune Rangers	0-09
1975	Glenbeigh-Glencar		Keel	
1974	Glenbeigh-Glencar	2-10	Keel	0-05
1973	Laune Rangers	0-07	Beaufort	0-06
1972	Milltown/Castlemaine		Beaufort	
1971	Keel	2-06, 2-09 (R)	Milltown/Castlemaine	2-06, 1-10 (R)
1970	Laune Rangers	1-07, 1-13 (R)	Keel	1-07, 3-04 (R)
1969	Laune Rangers	1-06	Glenbeigh-Glencar	0-06
1968	Keel	3-06	Laune Rangers	0-07
1967	Laune Rangers		Glenbeigh-Glencar	
1966	Laune Rangers	2-04	Glenbeigh-Glencar	1-06
1965	Milltown/Castlemaine	0-04 (R)	Keel	0-02 (R)
1964	Glenbeigh-Glencar	1-06	Laune Rangers	1-04
1963	Laune Rangers	1-05	Milltown/Castlemaine	1-03
1962	Milltown/Castlemaine	2-04	Laune Rangers	1-04
1961	Milltown/Castlemaine		Glenbeigh-Glencar	
1960	Keel	2-07	Laune Rangers	1-05
1959	Keel		Laune Rangers	
1958	Laune Rangers	2-02	Milltown/Castlemaine	0-04
1957	Keel	0-04, 2-06 (R)	Milltown/Castlemaine	1-01, 1-06 (R)
1956*	Glenbeigh-Glencar		Keel	
1955	Milltown/Castlemaine	3-04	Laune Rangers	0-04
1954	Milltown/Castlemaine	1-04	Glenbeigh-Glencar	0-00
1953	Milltown/Castlemaine	0-03	Glenbeigh-Glencar	0-01
1952	Unfinished			
1951	Unfinished			
1950	Firies			
1949	Glenbeigh-Glencar	3-01	Milltown/Castlemaine	1-02
1948	Keel	2-04	Firies	1-04
1947	Milltown/Castlemaine	1-07	Laune Rangers	1-02

* The 1956 final was abandoned and awarded to Glenbeigh-Glencar.

== See also ==
- East Kerry Senior Football Championship
- North Kerry Senior Football Championship
- West Kerry Senior Football Championship
