= 1980 All-Ireland Minor Football Championship =

Gaelic football competition

Championship details

All-Ireland Champions
- Winning team: Kerry (9th win)

All-Ireland Finalists
- Losing team: Derry

Provincial Champions
- Munster: Kerry
- Leinster: Meath
- Ulster: Derry
- Connacht: Mayo

The 1980 All-Ireland Minor Football Championship was the 49th staging of the All-Ireland Minor Football Championship, the Gaelic Athletic Association's premier inter-county Gaelic football tournament for boys under the age of 18.

Dublin entered the championship as defending champions, however, they were defeated in the Leinster Championship.

On 21 September 1980, Kerry won the championship following a 3–12 to 0–11 defeat of Derry in the All-Ireland final. This was their ninth All-Ireland title and their first title in five championship seasons.

== Results ==
=== Connacht Minor Football Championship ===
Quarter-Finals

1980 Quarter-Final	Mayo	2-08 - 0-09	Sligo	St. Tiernach's Park, Crossmolina

Semi-Finals

1980 Semi-Final	Mayo	5-10 - 2-04	Leitrim	Páirc Seán Mac Diarmada, Carrick-on-Shannon

1980 Semi-Final	Galway	1-08 - 1-09	Roscommon	Dunlo GAA Grounds, Ballinasloe

Final

13 July 1980 Final	Mayo	3-08 - 2-09	Roscommon	Dr Hyde Park, Roscommon

=== Leinster Minor Football Championship ===
Preliminary Round

1980 Preliminary Round	Kildare	5-12 - 2-05	Carlow	Dr Cullen Park, Carlow

1980 Preliminary Round	Westmeath	4-11 - 1-06	Kilkenny	O'Moore Park, Portlaoise

1980 Preliminary Round	Louth	1-15 - 1-05	Wexford	Croke Park, Dublin

1980 Preliminary Round	Longford	3-06 - 2-09	Laois	O'Moore Park, Portlaoise

1980 Preliminary Round Replay	Longford	5-09 - 3-12	Laois	Pearse Park, Longford

Quarter-Finals

1980 Quarter-Final	Kildare	2-14 - 0-09	Wicklow	Dr Cullen Park, Carlow

1980 Quarter-Final	Louth	2-07 - 1-08	Offaly	Croke Park, Dublin

1980 Quarter-Final	Meath	2-13 - 1-04	Westmeath	O'Connor Park, Tullamore

1980 Quarter-Final	Dublin	2-06 - 1-06	Longford	Cusack Park, Mullingar

Semi-Finals

1980 Semi-Final	Kildare	1-11 - 1-08	Louth	Croke Park, Dublin

1980 Semi-Final	Meath	3-07 - 3-05	Dublin	Páirc Tailteann, Navan

Final

27 July 1980 Final	Meath	1-12 - 1-09	Kildare	Croke Park, Dublin

=== Munster Minor Football Championship ===
Quarter-Finals

1980 Quarter-Final	Kerry	5-15 - 0-03	Waterford	Glenflesk

1980 Quarter-Final	Cork	2-18 - 0-04	Clare	Gaelic Grounds, Limerick

Semi-Finals

1980 Semi-Final	Cork	8-20 - 1-02	Limerick	Gaelic Grounds, Limerick

1980 Semi-Final	Kerry	4-08 - 3-09	Tipperary	Ned Hall Park, Clonmel

Final

6 July 1980 Final	Kerry	1-12 - 1-10	Cork	Páirc Uí Chaoimh, Cork

=== Ulster Minor Football Championship ===
Preliminary Round

1980 Preliminary Round	Antrim	2-11 - 2-10	Tyrone	Casement Park, Belfast

Quarter-Finals

1980 Quarter-Final	Down	3-10 - 3-05	Monaghan	Pairc Esler, Newry

1980 Quarter-Final	Armagh	1-09 - 1-04	Fermanagh	St. Molaise Park, Irvinestown

1980 Quarter-Final	Derry	1-09 - 0-05	Cavan	Dean McGlinchey Park, Ballinascreen

1980 Quarter-Final	Donegal	1-09 - 0-06	Antrim	St. Molaise Park, Irvinestown

Semi-Finals

1980 Semi-Final	Armagh	1-13 - 3-04	Down	Breffni Park, Cavan

1980 Semi-Final	Derry	0-11 - 0-06	Donegal	St. Tiernach's Park, Clones

Final

20 July 1980 Final	Derry	3-14 - 1-02	Armagh	St. Tiernach's Park, Clones

=== All-Ireland Minor Football Championship ===
Semi-Finals

10 August 1980 Semi-Final	Derry	1-11 - 0-11	Mayo	Croke Park, Dublin

17 August 1980 Semi-Final	Kerry	3-05 - 0-10	Meath	Croke Park, Dublin

Final

21 September 1980 Final	Kerry	3-12 - 0-11	Derry	Croke Park, Dublin
