= 1978 All-Ireland Minor Football Championship =

Gaelic football competition

Championship details

All-Ireland Champions
- Winning team: Mayo (5th win)

All-Ireland Finalists
- Losing team: Dublin

Provincial Champions
- Munster: Kerry
- Leinster: Dublin
- Ulster: Tyrone
- Connacht: Mayo

The 1978 All-Ireland Minor Football Championship was the 47th staging of the All-Ireland Minor Football Championship, the Gaelic Athletic Association's premier inter-county Gaelic football tournament for boys under the age of 18.

Down entered the championship as defending champions, however, they were defeated in the Ulster Championship.

On 24 September 1978, Mayo won the championship following a 4-9 to 3-8 defeat of Dublin in the All-Ireland final. This was their fourth All-Ireland title overall and their first title in seven championship seasons.

== Results ==
=== Connacht Minor Football Championship ===
Quarter-Finals

May 1978 Quarter-Final	Mayo	10-11 - 2-05	Leitrim	James Stephens Park, Ballina

Semi-Finals

June 1978 Semi-Final	Mayo	2-10 - 1-08	Roscommon	Dr Hyde Park, Roscommon

June 1978 Semi-Final	Sligo	0-08 - 2-13	Galway	Kilcoyne Park, Tubbercurry

Final

9 July 1978 Final	Mayo	2-06 - 2-04	Galway	Pearse Stadium, Galway

=== Leinster Minor Football Championship ===
Preliminary Round

May 1978 Preliminary Round	Louth	2-05 - 2-06	Kildare	Páirc Tailteann, Navan

May 1978 Preliminary Round	Longford	1-10 - 1-08	Offaly	Cusack Park, Mullingar

Quarter-Finals

June 1978 Quarter-Final	Wexford	2-07 - 1-06	Wicklow	Dr Cullen Park, Carlow

June 1978 Quarter-Final	Kildare	0-07 - 1-11	Meath	Croke Park, Dublin

June 1978 Quarter-Final	Dublin	5-13 - 1-05	Westmeath	Páirc Tailteann, Navan

June 1978 Quarter-Final	Longford	2-10 - 0-14	Laois	O'Connor Park, Tullamore

Semi-Finals

July 1978 Semi-Final	Meath	2-07 - 2-07	Wexford	Croke Park, Dublin

July 1978 Semi-Final	Dublin	2-13 - 1-07	Longford	O'Moore Park, Portlaoise

Final

30 July 1978 Final	Dublin	3-12 - 0-11	Wexford	Croke Park, Dublin

=== Ulster Minor Football Championship ===
Preliminary Round

1978 Preliminary Round	Derry	2-10 - 3-04	Donegal	Dean McGlinchey Park, Ballinascreen

Quarter-Finals

1978 Quarter-Final	Monaghan	3-10 - 0-03	Antrim	Casement Park, Belfast

1978 Quarter-Final	Down	3-07 - 0-08	Fermanagh	St. Molaise Park, Irvinestown

1978 Quarter-Final	Armagh	1-07 - 0-08	Cavan	Breffni Park, Cavan

1978 Quarter-Final	Tyrone	1-08 - 1-05	Down	The Playing Fields, Lurgan

Semi-Finals

1978 Semi-Final	Tyrone	2-04 - 0-09	Down	Casement Park, Belfast

1978 Semi-Final	Armagh	0-07 - 2-11	Monaghan	St. Mary's Park, Castleblaney

Final

23 July 1978 Final	Tyrone	3-11 - 2-09	Monaghan	St. Tiernach's Park, Clones

=== Munster Minor Football Championship ===
Quarter-Final

1978 Quarter-Final	Limerick	1-09 - 2-05	Clare	Shannon

Semi-Finals

1978 Semi-Final	Kerry	1-13 - 1-07	Tipperary	Milltown

1978 Semi-Final	Cork	2-11 - 1-04	Limerick	Páirc Uí Chaoimh, Cork

Final

16 July 1978 Final	Cork	0-06 - 1-04	Kerry	Páirc Uí Chaoimh, Cork

=== All-Ireland Minor Football Championship ===
Quarter-Final

6 August 1978 Quarter-Final	Mayo	8-18 - 1-03	New York	McHale Park, Castlebar

Semi-Finals

13 August 1978 Semi-Final	Mayo	1-10 - 0-10	Kerry	Croke Park, Dublin

20 August 1978 Semi-Final	Tyrone	1-09 - 5-07	Dublin	Croke Park, Dublin

Final

24 September 1978 Final	Mayo	4-09 - 3-08	Dublin	Croke Park, Dublin
