= John Joe Sheehy =

Personal information
- Native name: Seán Seosamh Ó Síoda (Irish)
- Born: 16 October 1897 Tralee, County Kerry
- Died: 12 January 1980 (aged 82)
- Height: 5 ft 11 in (180 cm)

Sport
- Sport: Gaelic football
- Position: Left corner-forward
Club
- Years: Club
- 1920s–1930s 1920s–1930s: John Mitchels Tralee Parnells
Club titles
- Kerry titles: 1
Inter-county
Years	County	Apps (scores)
1919–1930	Kerry	35 (4–22)
Inter-county titles
- Munster titles: 7
- All-Irelands: 4
- NFL: 2

John Joseph Sheehy (16 October 1897 – 12 January 1980) was an Irish political/military activist and sportsperson. He participated in the Irish War of Independence and Irish Civil War in the Irish Republican Army (IRA), where he was a senior figure in County Kerry. He also gained fame as a successful Gaelic footballer representing the Kerry county team.

== IRA activities ==
In 1914 Sheehy joined the republican boy scouts the Fianna Éireann and later the Irish Volunteers. Sheehy commanded the Boherbee company of the IRA, and later of the Tralee. His brother Jimmy was killed in the British Army in the Battle of the Somme in 1916.

He sided against the Anglo-Irish Treaty in 1922, like most of the IRA in Kerry. In the Civil War, when Free State troops landed in Kerry as part of a seaborne offensive, he was in command of the Anti-Treaty garrison in Tralee. After the Army took the town, Sheehy retreated, burning the barracks there. As the conflict became a guerrilla affair, he found himself in charge of three 'columns', or around 75 men in total, in the Ballymacthomas area. He and Tom McEllistrim were in charge of an attack on Castlemaine in January 1923.

Just after the Civil War, when Sheehy was still on the run, he managed to play football for Kerry. Kerry captain Con Brosnan, though a member of the Free State army, would guarantee his safe passage. Sheehy would pay his way into Munster and All Ireland finals, slip off his street clothes, play, and then at the final whistle, disappear back into the crowd. In 1936 Sheehy was in New York and was able to smuggle a large number of Thompson sub machine guns back to Ireland.

== Prison ==
In February 1941 Sheehy was arrested and interned in the Curragh Internment Camp for two years. Sheehy was arrested again and charged with making "seditious speeches" on the day that IRA hunger striker Seán McCaughey died (11 May 1946). Sheehy was found guilty and sentenced to four months imprisonment.

== Sporting career ==
He played Gaelic football with his local club John Mitchels and was a member of the senior Kerry county team from 1919 until 1930. He also played hurling with Tralee Parnells. Sheehy captained Kerry to the All-Ireland title in 1930. Three of his sons – Seán Óg, Niall and Paudie – all won All-Ireland titles with Kerry in the 1960s. He played in the Railway Cup Hurling final in 1927 and was captain of the Football team the same year and won other medals in 1931.

== Later life ==
Sheehy remained a staunch supporter of Sinn Féin, and was critical of the moves to end abstention by the party in the late 1960s. He sided with the Provisionals in the split at the 1970 Ard Fheis and remained active in Provisional Sinn Féin until his death, supporting the IRA's guerrilla campaign. John Joe Sheehy died in Tralee, and was given a republican funeral at his own request. Sheehy's funeral oration was given by Dáithí Ó Conaill, vice-president of Sinn Féin.

Sporting positions
Preceded by Tom O'Mahony (gaelic footballer)	Kerry Senior Football Captain; 1926	Succeeded by Joe Barrett
Preceded by Joe Barrett	Kerry Senior Football Captain; 1927–1928	Succeeded by Joe Barrett
Preceded by Joe Barrett	Kerry Senior Football Captain; 1930	Succeeded by Con Brosnan
Achievements
Preceded by - (Galway)	All-Ireland Senior Football winning captain 1926	Succeeded by Mick Buckley (Kildare)
Achievements
Preceded by Joe Barrett (Kerry)	All-Ireland Senior Football winning captain 1930	Succeeded by Con Brosnan (Kerry)
