= 1977 All-Ireland Minor Football Championship =

Gaelic football competition

Championship details

All-Ireland Champions
- Winning team: Down (1st win)

All-Ireland Finalists
- Losing team: Meath

Provincial Champions
- Munster: Cork
- Leinster: Meath
- Ulster: Down
- Connacht: Mayo

The 1977 All-Ireland Minor Football Championship was the 46th staging of the All-Ireland Minor Football Championship, the Gaelic Athletic Association's premier inter-county Gaelic football tournament for boys under the age of 18.

Galway entered the championship as defending champions, however, they were defeated in the Munster Championship.

On 25 September 1977, Down won the championship following a 2–6 to 0–4 defeat of Meath in the All-Ireland final. This was their first All-Ireland title.

== Results ==
=== Connacht Minor Football Championship ===
Quarter-Final

1977 Semi-Final	Letrim	1-15 - 2-06	Sligo	Páirc Seán Mac Diarmada, Carrick-on-Shannon

Semi-Finals

1977 Semi-Final	Letrim	1-10 - 1-09	Galway	Páirc Seán Mac Diarmada, Carrick-on-Shannon

1977 Semi-Final	Mayo	1-09 - 1-06	Roscommon	Castleblaney

Final

10 July 1977 Final	Mayo	2-20 - 0-07	Leitrim	Dr Hyde Park, Roscommon

=== Leinster Minor Football Championship ===
Preliminary Round

May 1977 Preliminary Round	Offaly	5-16 - 1-06	Wicklow	Croke Park, Dublin

May 1977 Preliminary Round	Kildare	6-13 - 0-03	Kilkenny	Geraldine Park, Athy

May 1977 Preliminary Round	Louth	3-22 - 0-02	Westmeath	Páirc Tailteann, Navan

May 1977 Preliminary Round	Longford	1-11 - 2-07	Carlow	O'Connor Park, Tullamore

Quarter-Finals

June 1977 Quarter-Final	Dublin	0-12 - 0-08	Kildare	Páirc Tailteann, Navan

June 1977 Quarter-Final	Offaly	4-12 - 1-09	Wexford	Croke Park, Dublin

June 1977 Quarter-Final	Louth	3-08 - 1-09	Laois	Croke Park, Dublin

June 1977 Quarter-Final	Meath	2-09 - 0-03	Longford	Cusack Park, Mullingar

Semi-Finals

July 1977 Semi-Final	Dublin	1-16 - 1-03	Offaly	Dr Cullen Park, Carlow

July 1977 Semi-Final	Meath	4-07 - 0-06	Louth	Croke Park, Dublin

Final

31 July 1977 Final	Meath	1-07 - 0-09	Dublin	Croke Park, Dublin

=== Munster Minor Football Championship ===
Quarter-Finals

1977 Quarter-Final	Limerick	3-07 - 1-03	Tippearary	Gaelic Grounds, Limerick

1977 Quarter-Final	Clare	1-05 - 0-08	Waterford	Fraher Field, Dungarvan

1977 Quarter-Final Replay	Clare	1-11 - 0-06	Waterford	Seán Treacy Park, Tipperary

Semi-Finals

1977 Semi-Final	Cork	0-15 - 0-10	Clare	Gaelic Grounds, Limerick

1977 Semi-Final	Limerick	2-07 - 2-08	Kerry	Gaelic Grounds, Limerick

Final

24 July 1977 Final	Cork	1-07 - 1-03	Kerry	Páirc Uí Chaoimh, Cork

=== Ulster Minor Football Championship ===
Preliminary Round

1977 Preliminary Round	Donegal	2-10 - 3-08	Derry	MacCumhaill Park, Ballybofey

Quarter-Finals

1977 Quarter-Final	Antrim	1-10 - 2-07	Monaghan	St. Mary's Park, Castleblaney

1977 Quarter-Final	Armagh	2-15 - 0-04	Cavan	Athletic Grounds, Armagh

1977 Quarter-Final	Down	4-15 - 0-02	Fermanagh	Pairc Esler, Newry

1977 Quarter-Final	Derry	2-06 - 1-06	Armagh	The Playing Fields, Lurgan

Semi-Finals

1977 Semi-Final	Antrim	0-00 - 0-0 won	Armagh	Pairc Esler, Newry

1977 Semi-Final	Down	1-09 - 0-05	Derry	St Tiernach's Park, Clones

Final

24 July 1977 Final	Down	0-08 - 1-05	Armagh	St Tiernach's Park, Clones

31 July 1977 Final Replay	Down	0-11 - 1-06	Armagh	St. Mary's Park, Castleblaney

=== All-Ireland Minor Football Championship ===
Semi-Finals

14 August 1977 Semi-Final	Down	2-11 - 1-07	Mayo	Croke Park, Dublin

21 August 1977 Semi-Final	Cork	1-05 - 0-12	Meath	Croke Park, Dublin

Final

25 September 1977 Final	Down	2-06 - 0-04	Meath	Croke Park, Dublin
