= 1979 All-Ireland Minor Football Championship =

Gaelic football competition

Championship details

All-Ireland Champions
- Winning team: Dublin (8th win)

All-Ireland Finalists
- Losing team: Kerry

Provincial Champions
- Munster: Kerry
- Leinster: Dublin
- Ulster: Down
- Connacht: Mayo

The 1979 All-Ireland Minor Football Championship was the 48th staging of the All-Ireland Minor Football Championship, the Gaelic Athletic Association's premier inter-county Gaelic football tournament for boys under the age of 18.

Mayo entered the championship as defending champions, however, they were defeated by Dublin in the All-Ireland semi-final.

On 16 September 1979, Dublin won the championship following a 0-10 to 1-6 defeat of Kerry in the All-Ireland final. This was their eighth All-Ireland title and their first title in twenty championship seasons.

== Results ==
=== Connacht Minor Football Championship ===
Quarter-Final

1979 Semi-Final	Leitrim	1-06 - 2-09	Sligo	Corran Park, Ballymote

Semi-Finals

1979 Semi-Final	Mayo	3-08 - 2-05	Sligo	James Stephens Park, Ballina

1979 Semi-Final	Roscommon	0-06 - 0-07	Galway	Dr Hyde Park, Roscommon

Final

15 July 1979 Final	Mayo	5-11 - 3-07	Galway	McHale Park, Castlebar

=== Leinster Minor Football Championship ===
Preliminary Round

May 1979 Preliminary Round	Wexford	2-07 - 0-07	Carlow	Nowlan Park, Kilkenny

May 1979 Preliminary Round	Kilkenny	0-05 - 6-11	Meath	Páirc Tailteann, Navan

May 1979 Preliminary Round	Laois	1-06 - 2-04	Weastmeath	O'Connor Park, Tullamore

May 1979 Preliminary Round	Longford	0-12 - 1-12	Louth	Croke Park, Dublin

Quarter-Finals

June 1979 Quarter-Final	Wexford	3-06 - 0-06	Wicklow	Nowlan Park, Kilkenny

June 1979 Quarter-Final	Meath	2-10 - 1-07	Kildare	Croke Park, Dublin

June 1979 Quarter-Final	Dublin	4-13 - 0-06	Louth	Páirc Tailteann, Navan

June 1979 Quarter-Final	Offaly	0-15 - 2-04	Westmeath	Cusack Park, Mullingar

Semi-Finals

July 1979 Semi-Final	Dublin	3-11 - 0-08	Wexford	St Conleth's Park, Newbridge

July 1979 Semi-Final	Offaly	2-05 - 3-09	Meath	Croke Park, Dublin

Final

29 July 1979 Final	Dublin	2-13 - 0-08	Meath	Croke Park, Dublin

=== Munster Minor Football Championship ===
Quarter-Finals

1979 Quarter-Final	Clare	0-11 - 0-08	Limerick	Roslevan

1979 Quarter-Final	Cork	1-10 - 1-05	Tipperary	Ned Hall Park, Clonmel

Semi-Finals

1979 Semi-Final	Kerry	1-11 - 0-07	Clare	Hennessy Memorial Park, Miltown Malbay

1979 Semi-Final	Waterford	3-06 - 6-11	Cork	Fraher Field, Dungarvan

Finals

22 July 1979 Final	Kerry	3-06 - 2-09	Cork	Fitzgerald Stadium, Killarney

29 July 1979 Final Replay	Kerry	1-11 - 1-05	Cork	Páirc Uí Chaoimh, Cork

=== Ulster Minor Football Championship ===
Preliminary Round

1979 Preliminary Round	Tyrone	0-06 - 0-06	Antrim	O'Neill Park, Dungannon

Quarter-Finals

1979 Quarter-Final	Down	1-15 - 1-04	Monaghan	St. Mary's Park, Castleblaney

1979 Quarter-Final	Armagh	2-13 - 1-04	Fermanagh	The Playing Fields, Lurgan

1979 Quarter-Final	Cavan	3-10 - 2-12	Derry	Breffni Park, Cavan

1979 Quarter-Final	Tyrone	1-10 - 0-03	Donegal	St. Molaise Park, Irvinestown

Semi-Finals

1979 Semi-Final	Armagh	1-02 - 0-07	Down	Breffni Park, Cavan

1979 Semi-Final	Cavan	0-03 - 2-08	Tyrone	Healy Park, Omagh

Final

22 July 1979 Final	Down	1-07 - 0-06	Tyrone	St. Tiernach's Park, Clones

=== All-Ireland Minor Football Championship ===
Quarter Final Down beat New York Semi-Finals

12 August 1979 Semi-Final	Down	0-07 - 1-15	Kerry	Croke Park, Dublin

19 August 1979 Semi-Final	Dublin	0-08 - 0-07	Mayo	Croke Park, Dublin

Final

16 September 1979 Final	Dublin	0-10 - 1-06	Kerry	Croke Park, Dublin
