= 1960–61 National Football League (Ireland) =

Gaelic football competition

League details
- Dates: November 1960 – 14 May 1961

League champions
- Winners: Kerry (6th win)
- Captain: Niall Sheehy

League runners-up
- Runners-up: Derry
- Captain: Jim McKeever

The 1960–61 National Football League was the 30th staging of the National Football League (NFL), an annual Gaelic football tournament for the Gaelic Athletic Association county teams of Ireland.

Kerry won the final by 20 points.

== Results ==
=== Finals ===
16 April 1961
Semi-Final

Derry	0-11 – 1-7	Mayo

Croke Park, Dublin

23 April 1961
Semi-Final

Kerry	1-8 – 1-8	Roscommon

Croke Park, Dublin

30 April 1961
Semi-Final Replay

Kerry	5-9 – 0-12	Roscommon

Croke Park, Dublin

14 May 1961
Final

Kerry	3-16 – 1-5	Derry
Dan McAuliffe 0-6; John Dowling 1-2; Brian Sheehy, Teddy Dowd 1-1 each; Mick O'Connell 0-4; Dave Geaney, Tom Long 0-1 each

Croke Park, Dublin
