= Niall Sheehy =

Irish hurler and Gaelic footballer

Personal information
- Born: Tralee, County Kerry

Sport
- Sport: Gaelic football
- Position: Full Back
Club
- Years: Club
- 1950's-1970's: John Mitchels
Club titles
- Kerry titles: 7
Inter-county
Years	County	Apps (scores)
1958-1965	Kerry	26
Inter-county titles
- Munster titles: 6
- All-Irelands: 2
- NFL: 2

Niall Sheehy was a Gaelic footballer from Tralee, County Kerry. He played Gaelic football and hurling with his local club John Mitchels, he also played hurling with Austin Stacks. He was also a member of the senior Kerry county football team from the 1958 until 1965, where he was nicknamed "Eusébio" for his kicking ability. He also played for the Kerry county hurling team. His father was John Joe Sheehy. His brothers - Seán Óg and Paudie - both won All-Ireland titles with Kerry in the 1960s. Sheehy captained Kerry to the All-Ireland final in 1964, but lost out to Galway. He also won an All-Ireland Junior Hurling Championship medal in 1961, Kerry's first All Ireland Hurling title since 1891, as well as 3 National Hurling League Div 2 titles.

At club level Sheehy was part of the famed John Mitchels team of the 1950s and 1960s, winning seven Kerry Senior Football Championships (1952, five in a row from 1959 to 1963 and again in 1966).

== Honours ==
=== Club ===
John Mitchels

- Kerry Senior Football Championship (7): 1952, 1959 (c), 1960, 1961, 1962, 1963, 1966

=== County ===
Kerry
Football

- Munster Senior Football Championship (6): 1958, 1960, 1961 (c), 1962, 1963 (c), 1964 (c)
- All-Ireland Senior Football Championship (2): 1959, 1962
- National Football League (2) 1961, 1963

Hurling

- Munster Junior Hurling Championship (1): 1961
- All-Ireland Junior Hurling Championship (1): 1961
- National Hurling League Division 2 (3) 1957. 1963, 1968
