= Caragh Lake =

Lake in County Kerry, Ireland

- Loch Cárthaí (Irish)
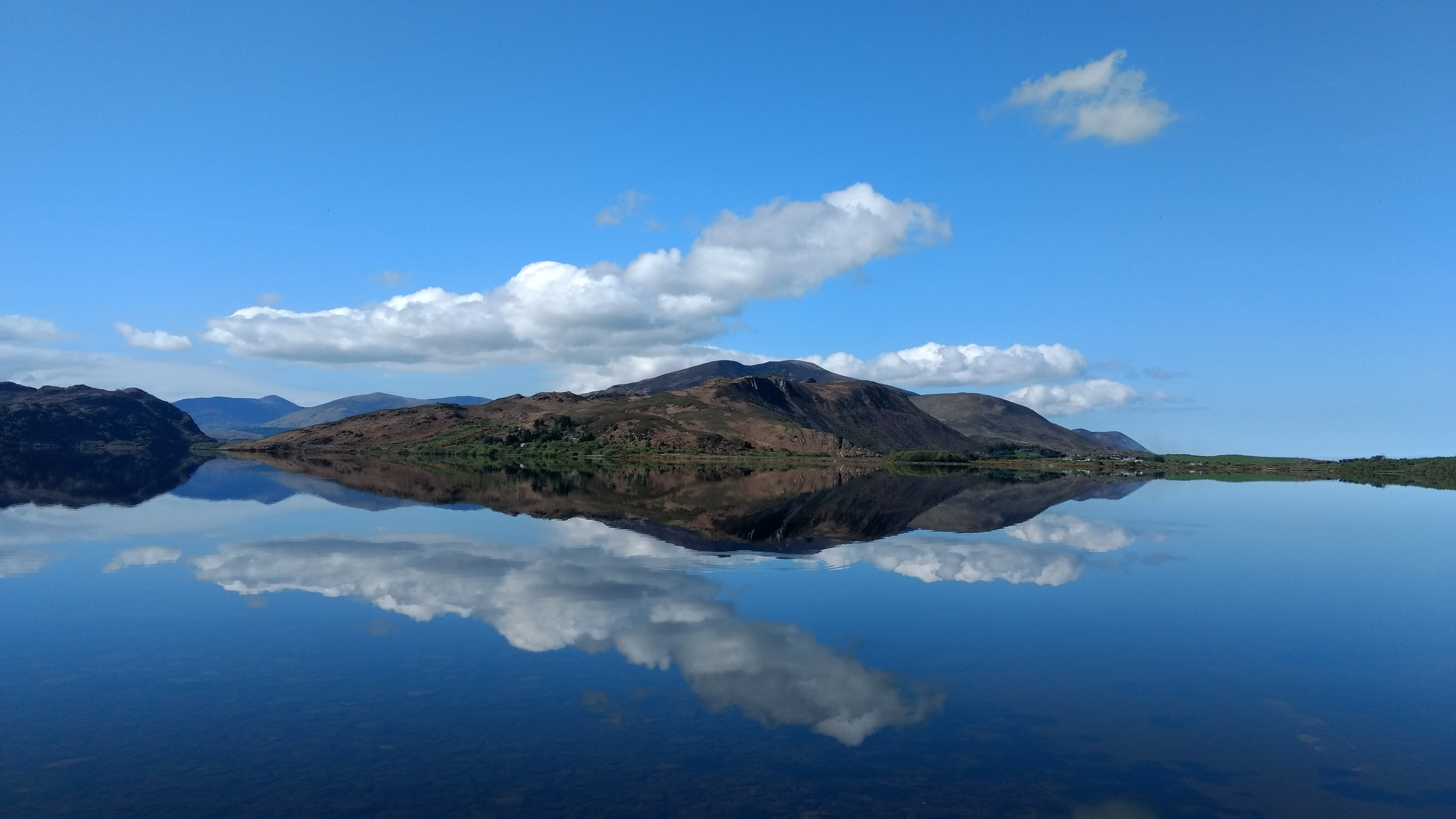

- Location in Ireland
- Location: County Kerry
- Coordinates: 52°3′58″N 9°51′10″W
- Catchment area: 162.54 km^{2} (62.76 sq mi)
- Basin countries: Ireland
- Surface area: 4.91 km^{2} (1.90 sq mi)
- Surface elevation: 15 m (49 ft)

Caragh Lake, officially Lough Caragh (Irish: Loch Cárthaí), is a lake in the Reeks District in County Kerry, Ireland. The lake was formed by the damming of the Caragh River. The lake is between the town of Killorglin and the village of Glenbeigh.

Caragh Lake railway station was on the Great Southern and Western Railway line which ran from Farranfore to Valentia Harbour.

== Ecology ==
The lake is included within a large Special Area of Conservation: Killarney National Park, Macgillycuddy's Reeks and Caragh River Catchment SAC. Most of Caragh Lake falls under this designation as an SAC. The rare Kerry slug was first discovered near this lake in 1842. The lake is glacial in origin.

== Luxury properties ==
The north-eastern corner of the lake, particularly surrounding the townland of Glannagilliagh, is home to a number of holiday properties, built from the 1970s onwards, which have views of the lake and MacGillycuddy's Reeks mountains. In a 2015 article in The Irish Examiner, the view across the lake from Glannagilliagh was described as being possibly "the most beautiful westerly view in Kerry".

Since the discovery of the rare Kerry slug and designation of the area as a Special Area of Conservation, planning permission for the construction of new homes has become difficult. Many of the luxury properties pre-date this ruling however, and extend to the lakeshore itself, including private slipways for the launching of boats. In 2016, real estate agents Savills noted that there was a premium on lakeside houses in the area, and that getting planning permission for a new build at the same scale as some of those existing would "be out of the question".

Although frequently only purchased with the intention of being used as holiday homes, properties in the area often sell for millions of euro.

== Gallery ==
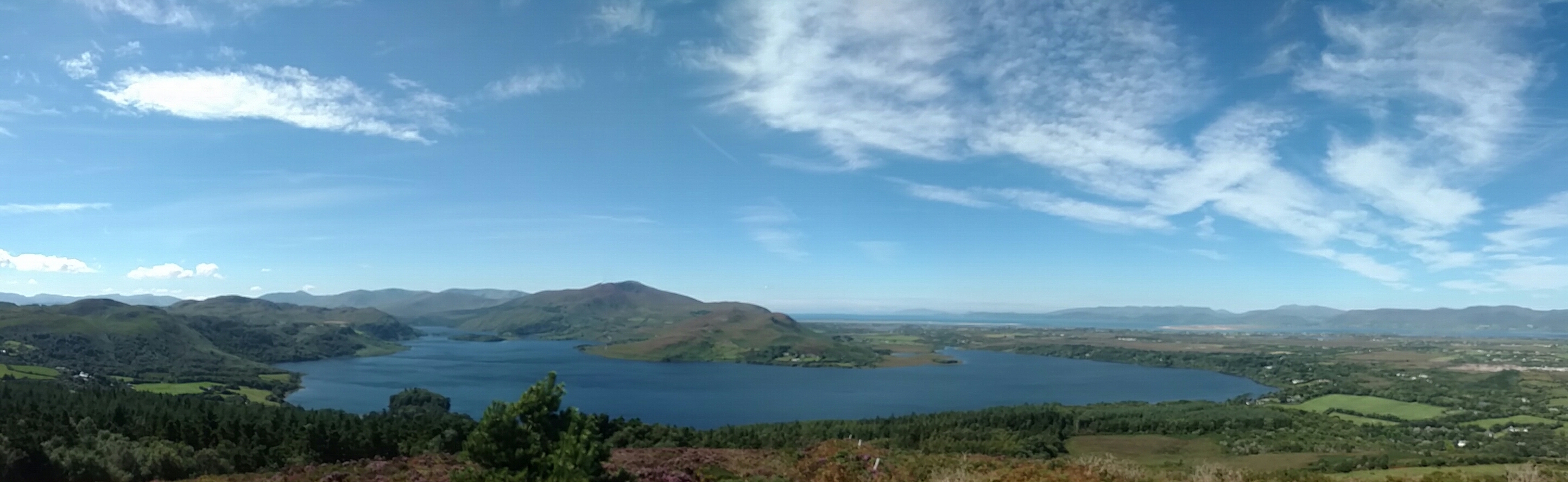
View from Caragh Lake Mountain

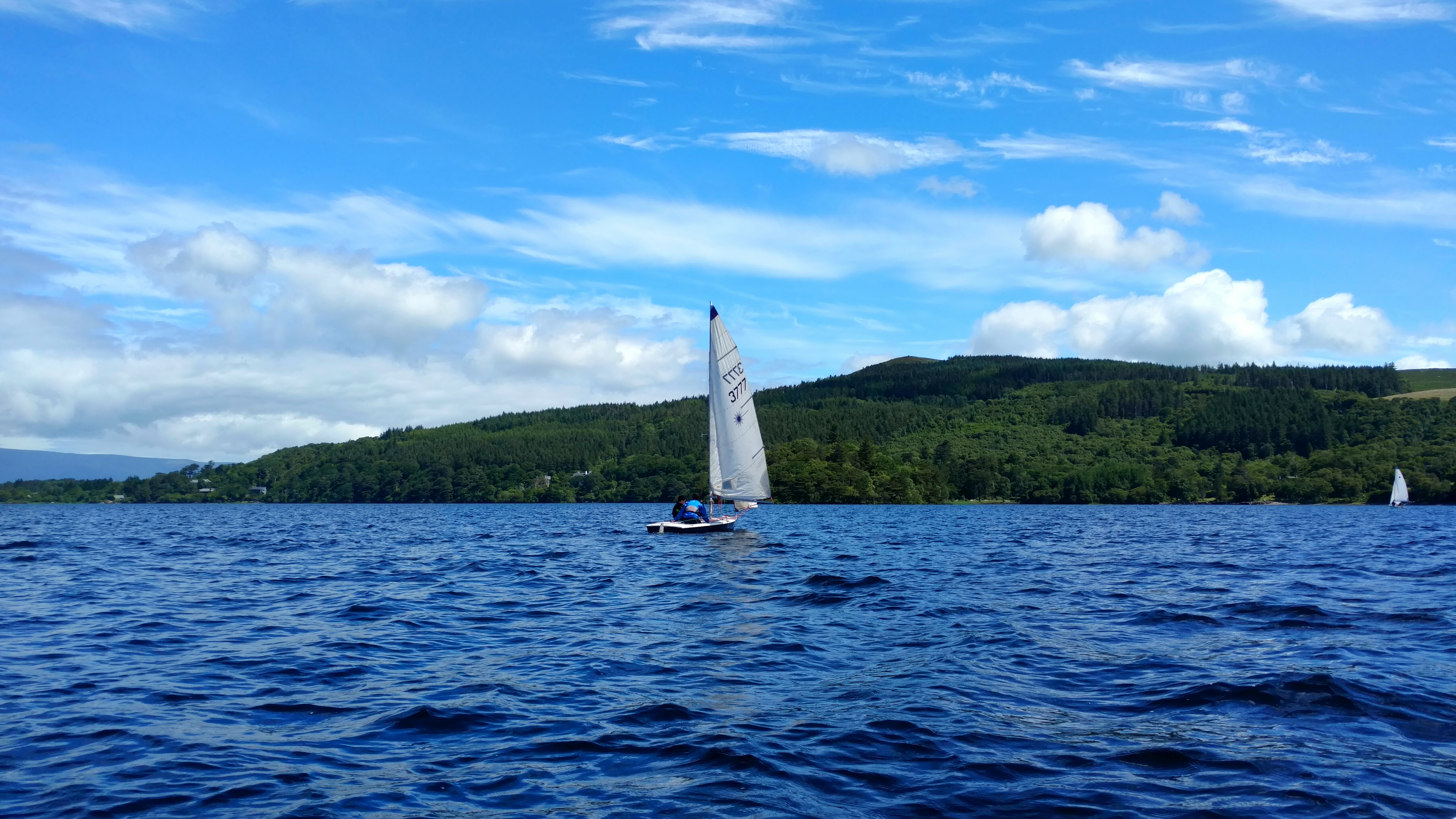
Sailing on Caragh Lake

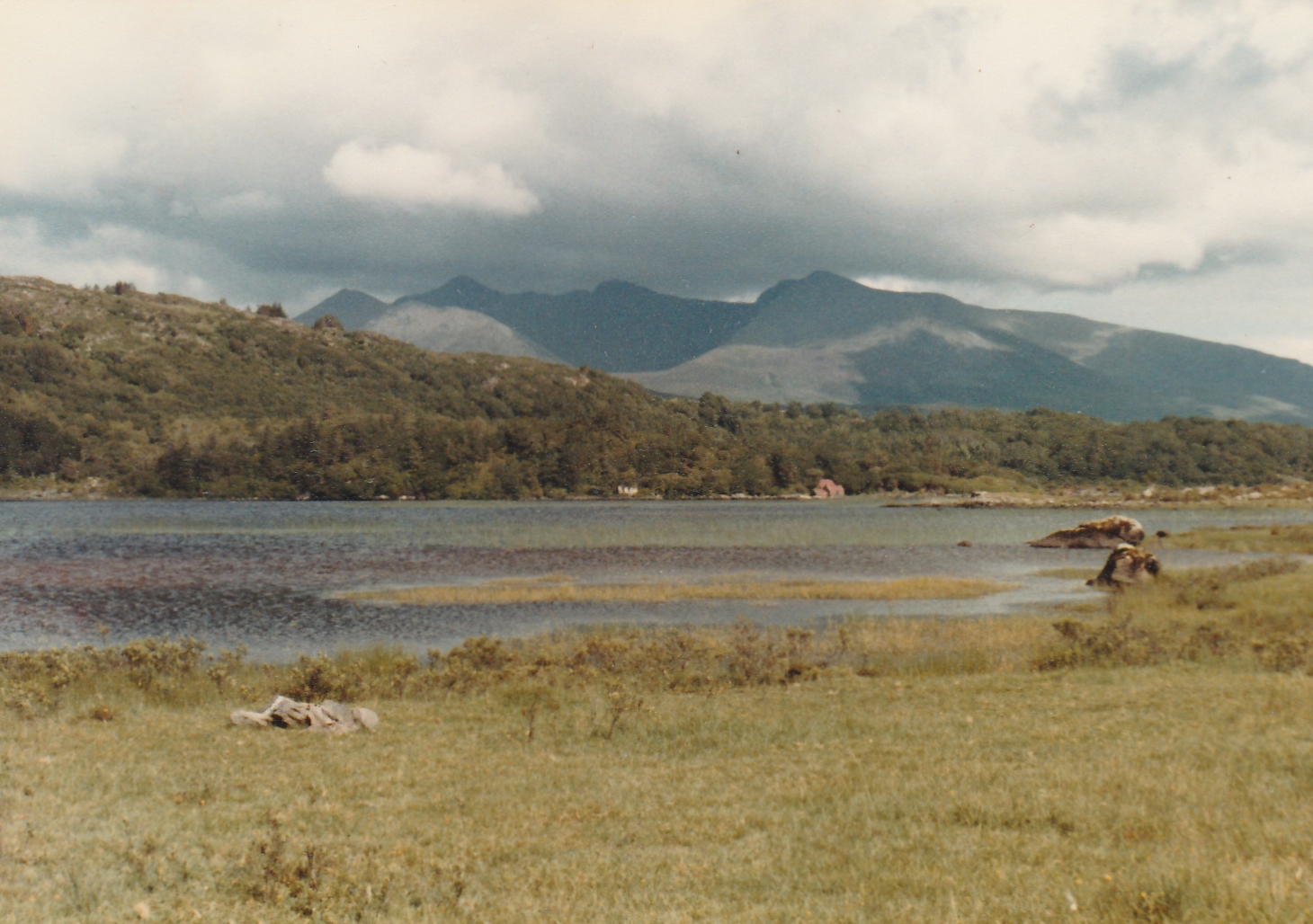
The lake in 1981, looking towards Carrauntoohil

== See also ==
- Caragh River
