= 1962–63 National Football League (Ireland) =

Gaelic football competition

League details
- Dates: October 1962 – 21 October 1963

League champions
- Winners: Kerry (7th win)
- Captain: Niall Sheehy

League runners-up
- Runners-up: New York

The 1962–63 National Football League was the 32nd staging of the National Football League (NFL), an annual Gaelic football tournament for the Gaelic Athletic Association county teams of Ireland.

New York again got a bye to the final. Kerry beat them by 8 points.

== Results ==
=== Division IV ===
==== Final ====
31 March 1963

Kerry	0-11 – 0-3	Clare

Askeaton

==== Group A ====
Team	Pld	W	D	L	Pts	Status
Kerry	4	3	1	0	7	Advance to knockout phase
Kildare	4	2	2	0	6
Carlow	4	2	0	2	4
Cork	4	1	1	2	3
Wexford	4	0	0	4	0

==== Group B ====
Team	Pld	W	D	L	Pts	Status
Clare	4	3	1	0	7
Limerick	4	3	0	1	6
Tipperary	4	1	1	2	3
Kilkenny	4	1	0	3	2
Waterford	4	1	0	3	2

== Knockout stage ==
=== Finals ===
12 May 1963
Home Final

Kerry	0-9 – 1-5	Down
Tom Long, Bernie O'Callaghan 0-3 each; Willie Doran, Mick O'Connell, Mick O'Dwyer 0-1 each

Croke Park, Dublin
Attendance: 57,180
Referee: P McArdle (Louth)

21 October 1963
Final

Kerry	1-18 – 1-10	New York
Mick O'Dwyer 0-7; Tomo Burke 1-1; Bernie O'Callaghan 0-3; Derry O'Shea, Denis O'Sullivan 0-2 each; Pat Aherne, JD O'Connor, Mick Fleming 0-1 each

Croke Park, Dublin
Referee: Tom Frawley (New York)
