= 1962 All-Ireland Senior Football Championship =

Football championship

Championship details
- Dates: 29 April – 23 September 1962
- Teams: 31

All-Ireland Champions
- Winning team: Kerry (20th win)
- Captain: Seán Óg Sheehy

All-Ireland Finalists
- Losing team: Roscommon
- Captain: Gerry O'Malley

Provincial Champions
- Munster: Kerry
- Leinster: Dublin
- Ulster: Cavan
- Connacht: Roscommon

Championship statistics
- No. matches played: 31

The 1962 All-Ireland Senior Football Championship was the 76th staging of All-Ireland Senior Football Championship, the Gaelic Athletic Association's premier inter-county Gaelic football tournament. The championship began on 29 April 1962 and ended on 23 September 1962.

Games were shown on television for the first time ever.

Down entered the championship as the defending champions, however, they were defeated by Cavan in the Ulster final.

Kerry won their twentieth All-Ireland title.

== Results ==
=== Connacht Senior Football Championship ===
Quarter-finals

10 June 1962 Quarter-final	Mayo	1–13 – 3–7	Sligo	Fr. O'Hara Park, Charlestown
	J Langan (0–2), J Corcoran (1–4), J Farragher (0–1), M Ruane (0–1); W Casey (0–2), P Gibbons (0–3).			Attendance: 8,000; Referee: J. Martin (Roscommon)

24 June 1962 Quarter-final replay	Sligo	1–7 – 1–6	Mayo	Markievicz Park, Sligo
	M Kerans 1–1, P Christie 0–4, J Killoran 0–2.		E Maguire 1–0, F Gibbons 0–2, J Corcoran 0–2, W Casey 0–1, J Farragher 0–1.	Referee: J. Martin (Roscommon)

Semi-finals

17 June 1962 Semi-final	Galway	3–7 – 1–10	Leitrim	Dunlo GAA Grounds, Ballinasloe
	S Purcell 2–1, C Dunne 0–5, S Leydon 1–0, P Leo 0–1.		C Flynn 1–5, P Guckian 0–2, P Dolan 0–2, P McGarty 0–1.

10 July 1962 Semi-final	Roscommon	3–6 – 1–11	Sligo	Fr. O'Hara Park, Charlestown
				Referee: M. Loftus (Mayo)

Final

22 July 1962 Final	Roscommon	3–7 – 2–9	Galway	MacHale Park, Castlebar
	Don Feely 1–4, A White 1–1, C Mahon 1–0, Des Feely 0–2.		J Geraghty 1–2, C Dunne 0–4, J Donnellan 1–0, F Lydon 0–2, F Purcell 0–1.	Attendance: 20,000; Referee: M. Higgins (Cavan)

=== Leinster Senior Football Championship ===
First round

29 April 1962 First round	Carlow	3–12 – 2–12	Kilkenny	Nowlan Park, Kilkenny
	B Hayden 3–7, P Walker 0–2, T Keogh 0–1, P Roberts 0–1, E Hogan 0–1.		T Wislon 0–9, J Nash 1–0, S Higgins 1–0, P Butler 0–3.

6 May 1962 First round	Laois	2–11 – 1–9	Longford	O'Connor Park, Tullamore

13 May 1962 First round	Kildare	5–12 – 1–6	Wexford	Dr. Cullen Park, Carlow
	J Hayden 3–0, P Cummins 2–1, K O'Malley 0–6, P LOughlan 0–3, J McNally 0–1, P Moore 0–1.		P Crowley 1–1, P Wilson 0–3, T Flynn 0–1, J Crowley 0–1.

20 May 1962 First round	Louth	1–11 – 0–6	Wicklow	Croke Park, Dublin
	F Clarke 1–2, K Behan 0–4, L Leech 0–2, J Judge 0–1, M McKeown 0–1, M Gartland 0–1.		J Kenny 0–3, J Hatton 0–1, P Roche 0–1, P Marah 0–1.	Referee: M Mangan (Dublin)

Quarter-finals

20 May 1962 Quarter-final	Carlow	2–4 – 2–9	Offaly	O'Moore Park, Portlaoise
	B Hayden 1–3, P Brophy 1–0, F Smith 0–1.		P Daly 1–1, T Cullen 1–0, H Donnelly 0–3, S Brearton 0–2, N Casey 0–1, T Furlong 0–1, M Brady 0–1.	Referee: E Moules (Wicklow)

27 May 1962 Quarter-final	Laois	2–8 – 1–9	Westmeath	O'Connor Park, Tullamore
	J Kenny 1–5, N Delaney 1–1, E Dunne 0–1, M Phelan 0–1.		J Bradley 1–2, G Kane 0–4, L Fagan 0–1, M Carley 0–1, J Dunne 0–1.

3 June 1962 Quarter-final	Dublin	1–8 – 0–10	Louth	Páirc Tailteann, Navan
	K Heffernan 1–1, J Timmons 0–5, C O'Leary 0–1, J Joyce 0–1.		K Behan 0–4, L Leech 0–2, P Cleary 0–1, D O'Neill 0–1, M McKeown 0–1, M Gartland 0–1.

10 June 1962 Quarter-final	Kildare	0–8 – 0–6	Meath	Croke Park, Dublin
	K O'Malley 0–4, P Cummins 0–2, P Moore 0–2.		D Carty 0–2, P McNamee 0–2, J Nallen 0–2.

Semi-finals

17 June 1962 Semi-final	Dublin	0–13 – 1–8	Laois	Dr. Cullen Park, Carlow
	P Delaney 0–4, J Timmons 0–3, K Heffernan 0–2, E Burgess 0–2, N Fox 0–1, P Farnan 0–1.		J Kenna 0–5, E Dunne 1–1, D Delaney 0–1, L Doran 0–1.

1 July 1962 Semi-final	Kildare	2–6 – 3–5	Offaly	Croke Park, Dublin
	P Cummins 1–2, P Moore 1–1, K O'Malley 0–2, M Carolan 0–1.		T Furling 1–3, M Casey 1–0, T Cullen 0–1, P Daly 0–1.	Attendance: 43,059; Referee: E O'Reilly

Final

15 July 1962 Final	Dublin	2–8 – 1–7	Offaly	Croke Park, Dublin
	Paddy Delaney 1–2 (0-1f), Bobby McCrea 1–1, John Timmons 0–3 (0-2f), Eamon Burgess and Johnny Joyce 0–1 each		Tommy Cullen 1–0, Harry Donnelly 0-3f, Sean Brereton 0–2, Larry Coughlan (1 '50) and Tom Furlong 0–1 each	Attendance: 59,643; Referee: Eamon Moulds (Wicklow)

=== Munster Senior Football Championship ===
Quarter-final

27 May 1962 Quarter-final	Tipperary	0–6 – 3–5	Waterford	Ned Hall Park, Clonmel
				Referee: D Gowen (Cork)

Semi-finals

17 June 1962 Semi-final	Cork	2–8 – 0–4	Clare	Buttevant Sportsfield, Buttevant
	J O'Sullivan 1–2, E Ryan 1–1, G Whyte 0–2, E McCarthy 0–2, V Barrett 0–1.

24 June 1962 Semi-final	Kerry	2–18 – 2–6	Waterford	Frank Sheehy Park, Listowel
	T Long 1–2, P Sheehy 0–4, D McAuliffe 0–4, S Roche 1–0, D Geaney 0–3, M O'Connell 0–3, M O'Dwyer 0–1, S Murphy 0–1.

Final

15 July 1962 Final	Cork	0–4 – 4–8	Kerry	Cork Athletic Grounds, Cork
	Gene McCarthy 0–3 and Vincent Barrett 0-1f		Dan McAuliffe 1–2 (0-2f), Mick O'Connell, Gene O'Driscoll, Tom Long 1–1 each, Jimmy Lucey, Dave Geaney, Paudie Sheehy 0–1 each	Attendance: 25,090; Referee: M Colbert (Limerick)

=== Ulster Senior Football Championship ===
Preliminary round

3 June 1962 Preliminary round	Derry	2–10 – 2–7	Donegal	Rossa Park, Magherafelt
				Attendance: 3,000

Quarter-finals

10 June 1962 Quarter-final	Antrim	2–7 – 0–2	Monaghan	Casement Park, Belfast
				Attendance: 3,000

17 June 1962 Quarter-final	Tyrone	1–9 – 2–2	Derry	O'Neill Park, Dungannon

24 June 1962 Quarter-final	Cavan	3–8 – 2–2	Armagh	Breffni Park, Cavan
	S McMahon 1–3, HB O'Donnell 1–0, J McDonnell 1–0, C Gallagher 0–2, J Brady 0–2, T Morris 0–1.		R Dowds 1–1, H Loughran 1–0, D Kelly 0–1.	Attendance: 12,000

1 July 1962 Quarter-final	Fermanagh	1–8 – 4–10	Down	St. Molaise Park, Irvinestown
				Attendance: 10,000

Semi-finals

8 July 1962 Semi-final	Antrim	0–5 – 1–6	Cavan	Casement Park, Belfast
	P McCaugue 0–3, L O'Connor 0–1, H O'Kane 0–1.		C Smith 0–4, S McMahon 1–0, T Lynch 0–1, J Stafford 0–1.	Attendance: 8,000

15 July 1962 Semi-final	Down	1–12 – 1–6	Tyrone	Casement Park, Belfast
	P Doherty 0–4, A Hadden 1–0, J McCartan 0–3, S O'Neill 0–3, J Lennon 0–1, J Carey 0–1.		F Donnelly 0–6, P Harte 1–0.

Final

29 July 1962 Final	Cavan	3–6 – 0–5	Down	Casement Park, Belfast
	J Stafford 2–0, C Gallagher 0–4, J Brady 1–0, S McMahon 0–2.		S O'Neill 0–2, J Lennon 0–1, P Doherty 0–1, A Hadden 0–1.	Attendance: 40,000

=== All-Ireland Senior Football Championship ===
Semi-finals

5 August 1962 Semi-final	Kerry	2–12 – 0–10	Dublin	Croke Park, Dublin
	T Long 1–3, G McMahon 1–1, M O'Connell 0–4, P Sheehy 0–2, D Geaney 0–1, T O'Sullivan 0–1.		C O'Leary 0–3, P Delaney 0–3, J Joyce 0–2, J Timmons 0–1, E Burgess 0–1.	Attendance: 60,396; Referee: L Maguire (Cavan)

19 August 1962 Semi-final	Roscommon	1–8 – 1–6	Cavan	Croke Park, Dublin
	A Kenny 1–0, Don Feely 0–3, C Mahon 0–2, E Curley 0–1, J Kelly 0–1, A Whyte 0–1.		J Bardy 1–0, C Gallagher 0–3, C Smyth 0–1, T Maguire 0–1, S MacMahon 0–1.	Attendance: 46,932

Final

23 September 1962 Final	Kerry	1–12 – 1–6	Roscommon	Croke Park, Dublin
	M O'Connell 0–7, G McMahon 1–0, P Sheehy 0–2, T O'Sullivan 0–2, T Long 0–1.		Don Feely 1–5, J Kelly 0–1.	Attendance: 75,771; Referee: Eamonn Moules (Wicklow)

== Championship statistics ==
=== Miscellaneous ===
- Sligo beat Mayo for the first time since 1928.
- Football matches were shown on Television for the first time ever.
- Garry McMahon of Kerry scored the fastest goal ever in an All-Ireland final when he found the net after just 34 seconds against Roscommon.
- The All-Ireland final between Kerry and Roscommon becomes the first championship game to be broadcast live on Telefís Éireann.

=== Scorers ===
Overall

Rank	Player	County	Tally	Total	Matches	Average

Single game

Rank	Player	County	Tally	Total	Opposition
