= 1946 All-Ireland Senior Football Championship final =

- Event: 1946 All-Ireland Senior Football Championship
Kerry	Roscommon
2–4 (10)	1–7 (10)
- Date: 6 October 1946
- Venue: Croke Park, Dublin
- Referee: Bill Delaney (Laois)
- Attendance: 75,771

1946 All-Ireland Senior Football Championship final replay
Kerry	Roscommon
2–8 (14)	0–10 (10)
- Date: 27 October 1946
- Venue: Croke Park, Dublin
- Referee: Paddy Mythen (Wexford)
- Attendance: 65,661

The 1946 All-Ireland Senior Football Championship final was the 59th All-Ireland Final and the deciding match of the 1946 All-Ireland Senior Football Championship, an inter-county Gaelic football tournament for the top teams in Ireland.

The game was originally set for 22 September, but was delayed for two weeks as part of the "Save the Harvest" campaign. (see: Winter of 1946–47)

== Matches ==
=== Summary ===
Roscommon had a six-point lead with three minutes left, but Kerry made an amazing comeback with goals by Paddy Burke and Tom "Gega" O'Connor. Burke and O'Connor also scored late goals in the replay.

It was the third of three All-Ireland SFC titles won by Kerry in the 1940s.

== Details ==
6 October 1946
Final

Kerry	2–4 – 1–7	Roscommon
Batt Garvey (0–1), Paddy Burke (1–1) & Tom Gega O'Connor (1–2).		D. Keenan (0–4), J.J. Fallon 1–1 & F. Kinlough (0–2).

Croke Park, Dublin
Attendance: 75,771
Referee: Bill Delaney (Laois)

27 October 1946
Final Replay

Kerry	2–8 – 0–10	Roscommon
Paddy Kennedy (0–1), Tom Gega O'Connor (1–4), Batt Garvey (0–2), Paddy Burke (1–0) & Sub Gus Cremin (0–1) for Jackie Falvey.		D. Keenan (0–7), J.J. Fallon (0–2) & J. McQullian (0–1).

Croke Park, Dublin
Attendance: 65,661
Referee: Paddy Mythen (Wexford)

=== Kerry ===
- 1 D. O'Keeffe
- 2 D. Lyne
- 3 J. Keohane
- 4 P. B. Brosnan
- 5 J. Lyne
- 6 B. Casey
- 7 E. Walsh
- 8 Teddy O'Connor
- 9 P. Kennedy (c)
- 10 J. Falvey
- 11 Tom 'Gega' O'Connor
- 12 B. Garvey
- 13 F. O'Keeffe
- 14 P. Burke
- 15 D. Kavanagh

Played in drawn game
G. Cremin
W. O'Donnell

Subs used in drawn game
E. Dowling for P. Kennedy
B. Kelleher for J. Lyne

Subs used in replay
G. Cremin for J. Falvey

=== Roscommon (is this the replay or the drawn game?) ===
- 1 G. Dolan
- 2 B Jackson
- 3 J. Casserly
- 4 O. Hoare
- 5 B. Lynch
- 6 B. Carlos
- 7 T. Collins
- 8 P. Murray
- 9 E. Boland
- 10 F. Kinlough
- 11 J Murray (c)
- 12 D. Keenan
- 13 J. McQuillan
- 14 J. J. Fallon
- 15 J. J. Nerney

Sub used
D. McDermott for B. Lynch
