= 1941 All-Ireland Minor Football Championship =

Gaelic football competition

Championship details

All-Ireland Champions
- Winning team: Roscommon (2nd win)
- Captain: Bill Carlos
- Manager: Tom Molloy

All-Ireland Finalists
- Losing team: Louth

Provincial Champions
- Munster: Kerry
- Leinster: Louth
- Ulster: Antrim
- Connacht: Roscommon

The 1941 All-Ireland Minor Football Championship was the 13th staging of the All-Ireland Minor Football Championship, the Gaelic Athletic Association's premier inter-county Gaelic football tournament for boys under the age of 18. As a result of the Emergency it was the last championship to be staged until 1945.

Louth entered the championship as defending champions.

Roscommon won the championship following a 3-6 to 0-7 defeat of Louth in the All-Ireland final, after leading 1-3 to 0-5 at half-time. This was their second All-Ireland title and their first in two championship seasons. The Tom Markham Cup was presented for the first time to the Roscommon captain after the game.

== Results ==
=== Connacht Minor Football Championship ===
Final	Roscommon	2-06 - 0-06	Galway

This final was played in Tuam on Sunday 3 August 1941.

=== Leinster Minor Football Championship ===
20 July 1941 Final	Louth	4-04 - 1-06	Wexford	Croke Park
	G. Cahill, M. Hardy, G O'Reilly 1-0 each, Wexford OG, P. Corr 0-3, J. MacArtain 0-1			Referee: P. Dunne (Dublin)

GK	1	Jackie Allen (Ardee minors)
RCB	2	P.J. Grist (Cooley Kickhams)
FB	3	Tom Mulligan (Dundalk Young Irelands)
LCB	4	Willie Piggott (Owen Roe's)
RHB	5	Joe Mulvihill (Geraldines)
CHB	6	Mick O'Grady (St. Mary's College) (c)
LHB	7	Joey Clarke (St. Mary's College)
MF	8	Brendan O'Dowda (De La Salle)
MF	9	Phil McCourt (Castlebellingham)
RHF	10	Joe MacArtain (St. Mary's College)
CHF	11	Peter Corr (Seán O'Mahony's)
LHF	12	Gus Cahill (St. Mary's College)
RCF	13	Éamonn Boyle (Cooley Kickhams)
FF	14	Mick Hardy (Cooley Kickhams)
LCF	15	Gerry O'Reilly (St. Mary's College)
Substitutes:
	16	Paddy Kelly (St Magdalene's) for Mulvihill

GK	1	D. Redmond (St John's Volunteers)
RCB	2	L. McCrudden (St John's Volunteers)
FB	3	W. Doyle (St Mary's, Rosslare)
LCB	4	T. O'Leary (St John's Volunteers)
RHB	5	W. Goodison (St John's Volunteers)
CHB	6	C. Dineen (Geraldine O'Hanrahans)
LHB	7	P. Waters (St Aidan's, Ballymitty)
MF	8	J. O'Connor (St John's Volunteers)
MF	9	J. Murphy (Enniscorthy Emmets)
RHF	10	T. Doyle (St John's Volunteers)
CHF	11	M. Corish (Gusserane O'Rahilly's)
LHF	12	K. Roche (St John's Volunteers)
RCF	13	J. O'Connor (St John's Volunteers)
FF	14	P. Jordan (Enniscorthy Emmets)
LCF	15	J. Kinsella (Starlights)
Substitutes:
	16	T. Carthy (Gusserane O'Rahilly's) for Corish

=== Munster Minor Football Championship ===
Final	Kerry	7-05 - 2-01	Waterford

=== Ulster Minor Football Championship ===
Final	Antrim	2-05 - 1-07	Cavan

=== All-Ireland Minor Football Championship ===
Semi-Finals

31 August 1941 Semi-Final	(replay) Roscommon	5-07 - 3-03	Kerry	Roscommon

31 August 1941 Semi-Final	Louth	4-07 - 0-04	Antrim	Athletic Grounds, Dundalk

21 September 1941 Final	Roscommon	3-06 - 0-07	Louth	Pearse Park, Longford
	B. O'Rourke 0-5 (2f), G. Kilduff 1-1, P. Duignan, P. Hanley 1-0 each		P. Corr 0-5 (2f), G. Cahill, P. McCourt 0-1 each	Referee: Seán Kennedy (Donegal)

GK	1	Gerard Dolan
RCB	2	Thomas F. Bannon
FB	3	Tim Lynch
LCB	4	Leo Kelly
RHB	5	Paddy Donnelly
CHB	6	Brendan Lynch
LHB	7	Paddy Hoare
MF	8	Bill Carlos (c)
MF	9	Éamonn Curran
RHF	10	Bartley O'Gara
CHF	11	Paddy Duignan
LHF	12	Brian O'Rourke
RCF	13	Christopher Murray
FF	14	Gerry Kilduff
LCF	15	Patrick Hanley
Substitutes:

GK	1	Jackie Allen (Ardee minors)
RCB	2	P.J. Grist (Cooley Kickhams)
FB	3	Tom Mulligan (Dundalk Young Irelands)
LCB	4	Willie Piggott (Owen Roe's)
RHB	5	Tommy Larkin (De La Salle)
CHB	6	Mick O'Grady (St. Mary's College) (c)
LHB	7	Joey Clarke (St. Mary's College)
MF	8	Brendan O'Dowda (De La Salle)
MF	9	Phil McCourt (Castlebellingham)
RHF	10	Joe MacArtain (St. Mary's College)
CHF	11	Peter Corr (Seán O'Mahony's)
LHF	12	Gus Cahill (St. Mary's College)
RCF	13	Éamonn Boyle (Cooley Kickhams)
FF	14	Mick Hardy (Cooley Kickhams)
LCF	15	Gerry O'Reilly (St. Mary's College)
Substitutes:
	16	Joe Mulvihill (Geraldines) for Piggott
