= 1944 All-Ireland Senior Football Championship final =

- Event: 1944 All-Ireland Senior Football Championship
Roscommon	Kerry
1–9 (12)	2–4 (10)
- Date: 24 September 1944
- Venue: Croke Park, Dublin
- Referee: Paddy Mythen (Wexford)
- Attendance: 79,245

The 1944 All-Ireland Senior Football Championship final was the 57th All-Ireland Final and the deciding match of the 1944 All-Ireland Senior Football Championship, an inter-county Gaelic football tournament for the top teams in Ireland.

== Match ==
=== Summary ===
Roscommon won their second and last title, with late points by Frankie Kinlough and Donal Keenan; Kinlough also scored Roscommon's goal.

=== Details ===
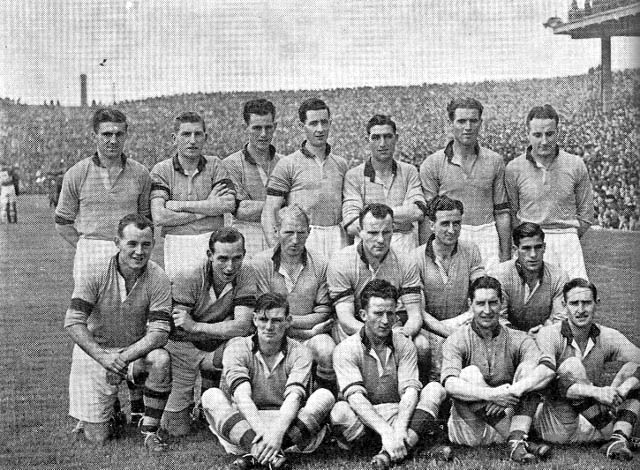
Roscommon team, champions

24 Sep 1944; Final	Roscommon	1–9 – 2–4	Kerry	Croke Park, Dublin; Attendance: 79,245; Referee: Paddy Mythen (Wexford)
24 Sep 1944; Final	D. Keenan (0–6), F. Kinlough (1–1), J. Murray & L. Gilmartin (0–1).		Bill Dillon (0–1), Paddy Kennedy (0–2), Murt Kelly (1–1) & Eddie Dunne (1–0).	Croke Park, Dublin; Attendance: 79,245; Referee: Paddy Mythen (Wexford)

Roscommon
Kerry

==== Roscommon ====
- 1 O. Hoare
- 2 B. Jackson
- 3 J. P. O'Callaghan
- 4 J. Casserly
- 5 B. Lynch
- 6 B. Carlos
- 7 P. Murray
- 8 E. Boland
- 9 L. Gilmartin
- 10 F. Kinlough
- 11 J Murray (c)
- 12 D. Keenan
- 13 H. Gibbons
- 14 J. McQuillan
- 15 J. J. Nerney

Trainer
T. Heneghan
