= 1943 All-Ireland Senior Football Championship final =

- Event: 1943 All-Ireland Senior Football Championship
Roscommon	Cavan
1–6 (9)	1–6 (9)
- Date: 26 September 1943
- Venue: Croke Park, Dublin
- Referee: Patrick McKenna (Limerick)
- Attendance: 68,023

1943 All-Ireland Senior Football Championship final replay
Roscommon	Cavan
2–7 (13)	2–2 (8)
- Date: 10 October 1943
- Venue: Croke Park, Dublin
- Referee: P O Miotain (Wexford)
- Attendance: 47,193

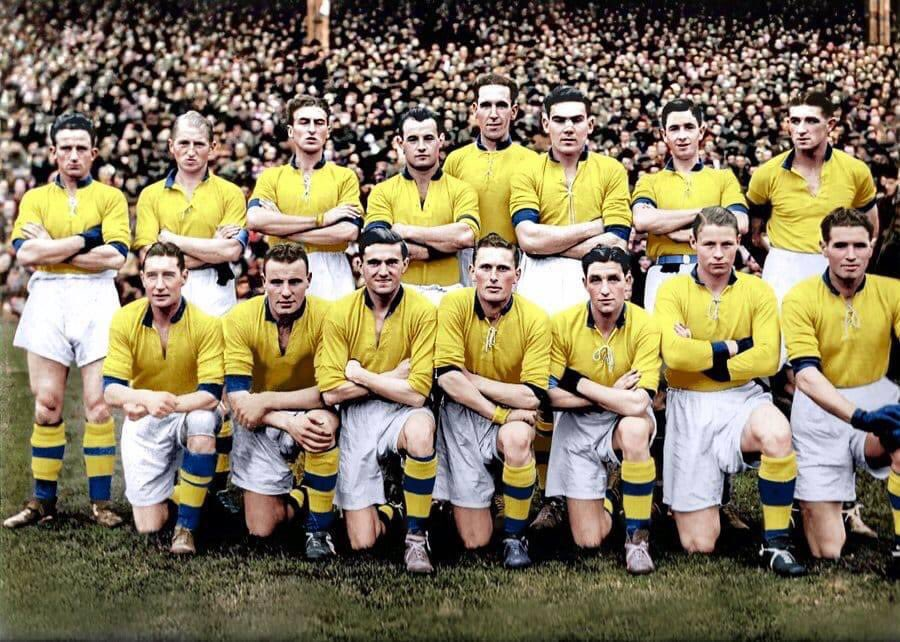
The Roscommon team that won the competition

The 1943 All-Ireland Senior Football Championship final was the 56th All-Ireland Final and the deciding match of the 1943 All-Ireland Senior Football Championship, an inter-county Gaelic football tournament for the top teams in Ireland.

== Matches ==
=== Summary ===
Roscommon defeated Cavan after a replay to win their first title.

Cavan finished the replay with fourteen men after Joe Stafford was dismissed with fifteen minutes remaining.

=== Details ===
==== Roscommon (is the replay or the drawn game?) ====
- 1 F. Glynn
- 2 L. Cummins
- 3 J. P. O'Callaghan
- 4 B. Jackson
- 5 B. Lynch
- 6 B. Carlos
- 7 B. Heavey
- 8 E. Boland
- 9 L. Gilmartin
- 10 P. Murray
- 11 J Murray (c)
- 12 D. Keenan
- 13 D. McDermott
- 14 J. McQuillan
- 15 F. Kinlough

Trainer
T. Heneghan
