= Patrick Burke =

Patrick, Paddy or Pat Burke may refer to:

- Patrick B. Burke (born 1984), Democratic politician from New York
- Patrick Burke (bishop) (1779–1843), bishop of Elphin from 1827 to 1843
- Patrick Burke (Clare politician) (1879–1945), Irish politician from Clare
- Patrick Burke (cricketer) (born 1919), Trinidadian cricketer
- Patrick Burke (Dublin politician) (1904–1985), Irish politician from Dublin
- Patrick Burke (defensive back) (born 1968), Canadian football player
- Patrick Burke (golfer) (born 1962), American golfer
- Patrick F. Burke (1934–2011), American football player, businessman
- Paddy Burke (born 1955), Irish Fine Gael party politician from County Mayo, Senator since 1993
- Paddy Burke (Australian footballer) (1898–1953), Australian rules footballer
- Paddy Burke (Gaelic footballer) (1921–1955), Irish Gaelic footballer
- Paddy Burke (hurler) (born 1995), Irish hurler
- Pat Burke (baseball) (1901–1965), Major League Baseball player
- Pat Burke (born 1973), Irish basketball player
- Pat Burke (association footballer) (1892–?), English footballer
- Pat Burke (Gaelic footballer), Irish Gaelic footballer
- Patrick E. Burke (1830–1864), lawyer, Missouri state legislator, and Civil War officer
