= Paddy Kennedy (Kerry Gaelic footballer) =

Irish Gaelic footballer

Personal information
- Native name: Pádraic Ó Cinnéide (Irish)
- Born: 25 September 1916 Abhainn an Scáil, County Kerry, Ireland
- Died: 18 May 1979 (aged 62) Dublin, Ireland
- Height: 6 ft 0 in (183 cm)

Sport
- Sport: Gaelic football
- Position: Midfield
Clubs
- Years: Club
- 1930s and 1940s: Kerins O'Rahillys; Garda; Geraldines
Club titles
- Kerry titles: Kerry and Dublin
- Munster titles: Munster and Leinster
Inter-county
| Years | County | Apps (scores) |
| 1936–1947 | Kerry | 44 (4–22) |
Inter-county titles
- Munster titles: 10
- All-Irelands: 5

Paddy Kennedy (1916-1979) was a Gaelic footballer from Kerry, active in the 1930s and 1940s. He was a member of the Garda Síochána for a time, but later became a sales representative for a mineral water company and managed the Crystal Ballroom in Dublin.

== Paddy Kennedy Memorial Park ==
The Annascaul GAA club's home ground, opened in 1984, is named Paddy Kennedy Memorial Park after him. Regarded by many as one of the all-time greats of Kerry football, he was captain of the 1946 All-Ireland winning team. The pitch was opened in 1984; the first game played there was between Kerry and Dublin. Since then, there have been many West Kerry League championship games and finals played there by all age groups as well as many County League championships. In 2003, the Munster Ladies Minor Football Championship final between Kerry and Cork was played there. In 2008, a round of the Ladies National League was played here between Kerry and Mayo.

== Playing career ==
=== Inter-county ===
Kennedy was Kerry captain in 1946 when Kerry defeated Roscommon in the final. He also played in the Polo Grounds final in New York in 1947 when Kerry lost to Cavan. During his playing days he won 5 Senior All Irelands, 1 Minor All Ireland, 1 Munster Minor, 10 Munster Senior Championship and 2 Railway Cups.

Kennedy played 45 games for Kerry between 1936 and 1947, 44 as a starter and 1 as a substitute, and scored 5–23 in the Championship matches. He played in 12 Munster Finals, winning 11 and losing 1. He also played in 8 All-Ireland finals, losing 3 and winning 5.

==== 1936 Championship ====
- Munster Quarter Final, 24 May: Kerry 7–7 Limerick 1–4. Kennedy played Left Half Forward, but did not score.
- Munster Semi-final, 12 July: Kerry 1–5 Tipperary 0–5. Kennedy played Left Half Forward, but did not score.
- Munster Final, 26 July: Kerry 1–11 Clare 2–2. Kennedy played Left Half Forward, and scored 0–3.
- All-Ireland Semi-final, 9 August: Mayo 1–5 Kerry 0–6. Kennedy played midfield, but did not score.

==== 1937 Championship ====
- Munster Quarter Final, 13 June: Kerry 6–7 Cork 0–4. Kennedy played midfield, and scored 0–2.
- Munster Semi-final, 11 July: Kerry 2–11 Tipperary 0–4. Kennedy played midfield, and scored 0–2.
- Munster Final, 18 July: Kerry 4–9 Clare 1–1. Kennedy played Midfield, but did not score.
- Kennedy did not play in the All-Ireland Semi-final against Laois, played on 15 August 1937 in Cork and which finished in a 2–3 to 2–3 draw, and also did not play in the Semi-final replay, played 22 August in Mullingar and which finished 2–2 to 1–4.
- All-Ireland Final, 26 September: Kerry 2–5 Cavan 2–5. Kennedy played midfield, but did not score. Kennedy did not play in the replay, which was played in Croke Park on 17 October 1937, and won by Kerry 4–4 to 1–7. The Radio Athlone commentator mistakenly announced Cavan as the winners of the first game; Packie Boylan's late point had actually been disallowed. Kerry won the replay by six points, with goals by Timmy O'Leary (2), Miko Doyle and John Joe Landers. It was the fourth of five All-Ireland football titles won by Kerry in the 1930s.

==== 1938 Championship ====
- Munster Semi-final, 29 May: Kerry 2–6 Clare 0–2. Kennedy played midfield, but did not score.
- Munster Final, 7 August: Kerry 4–14 Cork 0–6. Kennedy played Left Half Forward, and scored 1–1.
- All-Ireland Semi-final, 21 August: Kerry 2–6 Laois 2–4. Kennedy played Right Half Forward, and scored 0–1.
- All-Ireland Final, 25 September: Kerry 2–6 Galway 2–6. Kennedy played Left Half Forward, and scored 0–1.
- All-Ireland Final Replay, 23 October: Kerry 0–7 Galway 2–4. Kennedy played Left Half Forward, but did not score.

==== 1939 Championship ====
- Munster Final, 23 July: Kerry 2–11 Tipperary 0–4. Kennedy played midfield, but did not score.
- All-Ireland Semi-final, 13 August: Kerry 0–4 Mayo 0–4. Kennedy played Right Half Forward, but did not score.
- All-Ireland Semi-final Replay, 10 September: Kerry 3–8 Mayo 1–4. Kennedy played midfield, and scored 0–1.
- All-Ireland Final, 24 September: Kerry 2–5 Meath 2–3. Kennedy played Midfield, but did not score.

The 1939 All-Ireland Senior Football Championship Final was the 52nd All-Ireland Final and the deciding match of the 1939 All-Ireland Senior Football Championship, an inter-county Gaelic football tournament for the top teams in Ireland. Dan Spring (later TD and father of Tánaiste Dick Spring) scored both Kerry goals. Meath rued their missed chances – they shot 11 wides. It was the fifth of five All-Ireland football titles won by Kerry in the 1930s.

==== 1940 Championship ====
- Munster Semi-final, 30 June: Kerry 4–8 Tipperary 1–5. Kennedy played midfield, but did not score.
- Munster Final, 21 July: Kerry 1–10 Waterford 0–6. Kennedy played midfield, but did not score.
- All-Ireland Semi-final, 18 August: Kerry 3–4 Cavan 0–8. Kennedy played midfield, but did not score.
- All-Ireland Final, 22 September: Kerry 0–7 Galway 1–3. Kennedy played Right Half Forward, but did not score.

The 1940 All-Ireland Senior Football Championship Final was the 53rd All-Ireland Final and the deciding match of the 1940 All-Ireland Senior Football Championship, an inter-county Gaelic football tournament for the top teams in Ireland. Jimmy Duggan scored a goal for Galway just before half-time, but Kerry hit four points in the second half to secure a narrow victory. The game was plagued by fouls, sixty-two frees being awarded in all. It was the first of three All-Ireland football titles won by Kerry in the 1940s. It was also the first of three consecutive All-Ireland football finals lost by Galway.

==== 1941 Championship ====
- Munster Final, 20 June: Kerry 2–9 Clare 0–6. Kennedy played midfield, but did not score.
- All-Ireland Semi-final, 10 August: Kerry 0–4 Dublin 0–4. Kennedy played midfield, but did not score.
- All-Ireland Semi-final Replay, 17 August: Kerry 2–9 Dublin 0–3. Kennedy played midfield, but did not score.
- All-Ireland Final, 7 September: Kerry 1–8 Galway 0–7. Kennedy played Right Half Forward, but did not score.

The 1941 All-Ireland Senior Football Championship Final was the 54th All-Ireland Final and the deciding match of the 1941 All-Ireland Senior Football Championship. Kerry completed a three-in-a-row with a goal by Tom "Gega" O'Connor. The attendance was affected by restrictions under "The Emergency", with a thousand fans travelling by peat-fueled train, and two Kerrymen cycling a tandem bicycle from Killarney to Dublin. It was the second of three All-Ireland football titles won by Kerry in the 1940s. It was also the second of three consecutive All-Ireland football finals lost by Galway.

=== Club ===
Kennedy won a Kerry County Championship with Kerins O'Rahillys in 1939 and 4 Dublin County Championships: three with Geraldines and one with the Garda club he joined in the late 1930s.

== Honours ==
Inter-county

- All-Ireland Senior Football Championship 5: 1937, 1939, 1940, 1941, 1946
- All-Ireland Senior Football Championship Winning Captain 1946
- All-Ireland Minor Football Championship 1: 1933
- Munster Senior Football Championship 10: 1936, 1937, 1938, 1939, 1940, 1941, 1942, 1944, 1946, 1947
- Munster Minor Football Championship 1: 1933

Inter-provincial

- Railway Cup 2: 1941, 1946

Club

- Kerry Senior Championship 1: 1939
- Dublin Senior Football Championship 4: 1935 (Garda) 1940,1941,1942 (Geraldines)

Sporting positions
| Preceded by Gus Cremins | Kerry Senior Football Captain; 1946 | Succeeded by Dinny Lyne |
Achievements
| Preceded by Tadhgo Crowley (Cork) | All-Ireland Senior Football winning captain 1946 | Succeeded by J. J. O'Reilly (Cavan) |
