= List of politicians killed in the American Civil War =

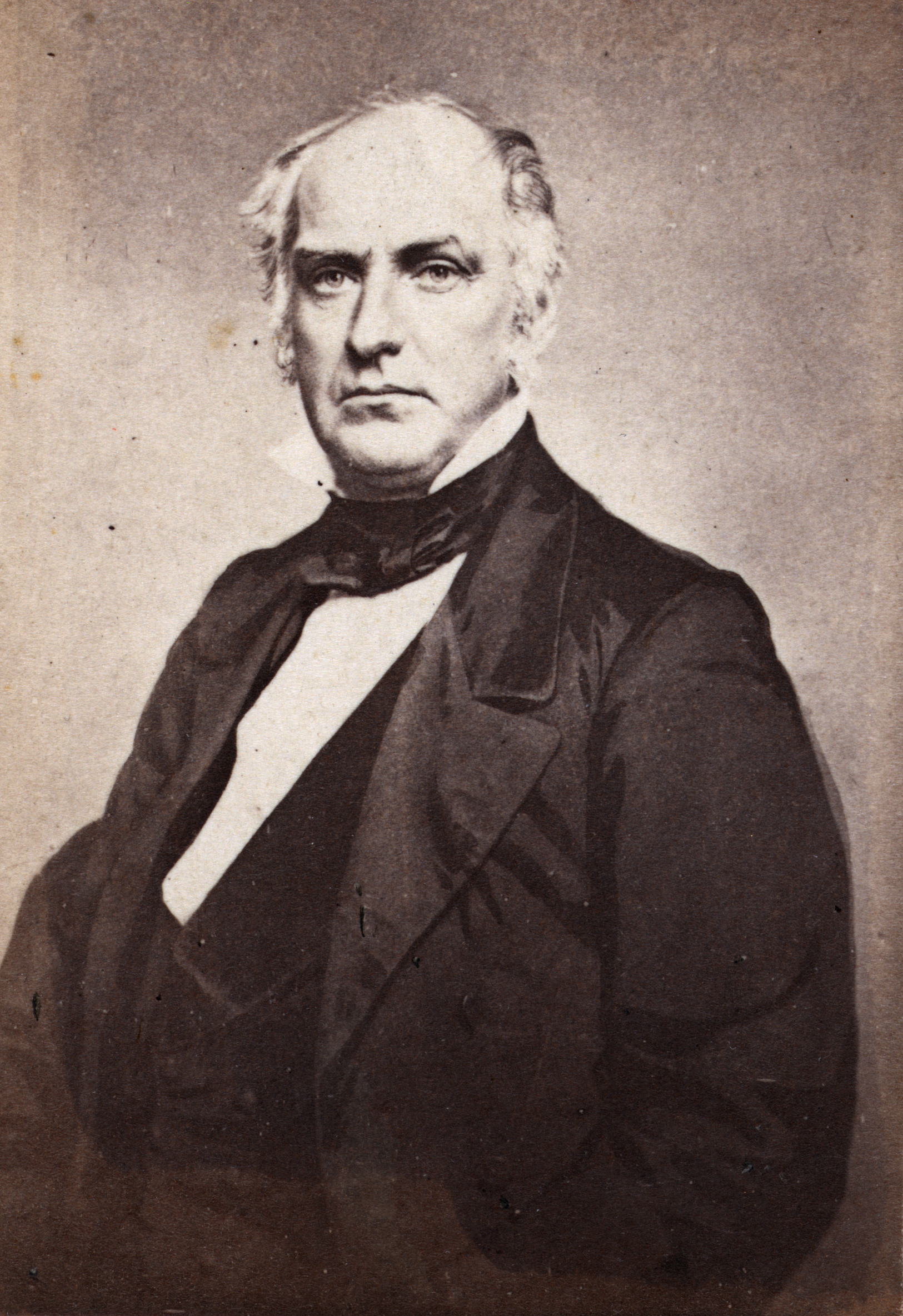
Oregon Senator Edward Dickinson Baker became the only sitting U.S. senator to ever be killed in a military engagement when he was shot and killed at the Battle of Ball's Bluff.

The American Civil War was a civil war in the United States between the Union (states that remained loyal to the federal union, or "the North") and the Confederacy (states that voted to secede, or "the South"). While the total death toll of the war is not fully known, it is generally agreed that it resulted in at least 1,030,000 casualties (3 percent of the population), including about 620,000 soldier deaths—two-thirds by disease—and 50,000 civilians. Some experts, including Binghamton University historian J. David Hacker, estimate the number of soldier deaths was at least 750,000, and possibly as high as 850,000. The Civil War remains the deadliest military conflict in American history.

During the first year of the war, both sides had many more volunteers than they had the time or resources to effectively train. However, this initial enthusiasm began to wane and both sides enacted conscription laws to amass more volunteers. In April 1862, the Confederacy passed a draft law aimed at men aged 18 to 35, with exemptions for overseers of slaves, government officials, and clergymen. Three months later, the United States Congress authorized state militias to draft from local populations when they couldn't met their quotas with volunteers. In total, the Union Army had 2,200,000 soldiers, including 698,000 at their peak. The Confederacy had 750,000 to 1,000,000 soldiers, with a peak of 360,000.

This list contains notable holders of political office who died as a result of their personal involvement in the Civil War, from both the Union and Confederate sides. Many of the politicians listed perished directly in battle, while others died because of the result of injuries sustained on the battlefield or smaller skirmishes, or as a result of the difficult circumstances they experienced as a soldier or prisoner of war. A few others were casualties of personal accidents or violence unrelated to battle. In addition to the offices they held and their allegiance during the war, this list also contains, when known, the politician's political party, profession, and circumstances surrounding their death.

== Deaths ==
Name	Date of death	Age	Political office(s) held	Party	Allegiance	Profession	Circumstances of death	Ref.
Josiah M. Anderson	November 8, 1861	53	Member of U.S. House of Representatives from Tennessee's 3rd district (1849–51); Member of the Tennessee Senate (1843–45); Member of the Tennessee House of Representatives (1833–37)	Whig	Confederacy	Lawyer	Stabbed in Marion County, Tennessee by Union forces just after having made a pro-secession speech	
Zenas Aplington	May 8, 1862	46	Member of Illinois Senate (1858–62)	Republican	Union	Farmer & merchant	Killed in a skirmish during the Siege of Corinth	
William Waightstill Avery	July 3, 1864	48	Member of the North Carolina Senate (1857–59); Member of the North Carolina House of Commons (1843–45; 1851–55)	Democrat	Confederacy	Lawyer	Died from wounds received in a skirmish with a party of Tennessee Unionists after a raid on Camp Vance by the Union's 3rd North Carolina Mounted Infantry	
Edward Dickinson Baker	October 21, 1861	50	United States Senator from Oregon (1860–61); Member of U.S. House of Representatives from Illinois's 6th district (1849–51) and Illinois's 7th district (1845–47); Member of the Illinois Senate (1840–44); Member of the Illinois House of Representatives (1837–40)	Republican	Union	Lawyer	Killed in the Battle of Ball's Bluff while leading a Union Army regiment	
William Barksdale	July 3, 1863	41	Member of U.S. House of Representatives from Mississippi's 3rd district (1855–61) and Mississippi's at-large district (1853–55)	Democrat	Confederacy	Lawyer & newspaper editor	Mortally wounded during the Battle of Gettysburg	
Francis S. Bartow	July 21, 1861	44	Member of the Georgia Senate (1845–47); Member of the Georgia House of Representatives (1841–45)	Whig	Confederacy	Lawyer	Killed at the First Battle of Manassas	
Samuel W. Black	June 27, 1862	45	Governor of Nebraska Territory (1859–61)	Democrat	Union	Lawyer & judge	Killed at the Battle of Gaines' Mill	
Lawrence O'Bryan Branch	September 17, 1862	41	Member of U.S. House of Representatives from North Carolina's 4th district (1855–61)	Democrat	Confederacy	Lawyer	Killed at the Battle of Antietam	
Edward Bullock	December 23, 1861	39	Member of the Alabama Senate	Democrat	Confederacy	Lawyer		
Patrick E. Burke	May 20, 1864	~34	Member of the Missouri House of Representatives (1855–57)	Democrat	Union	Lawyer	Died of gangrene three days after being shot in the leg at the Battle of Rome Cross Roads	
Thomas Drummond	April 2, 1865	~32	Member of the Iowa Senate (1860–62); Member of the Iowa House of Representatives (1858–60)	Republican	Union	Newspaper editor	Died of injuries sustained during the Battle of Five Forks	
Edward F. W. Ellis	April 6, 1862	42	Member of the California State Assembly (1851–52)	Whig	Union	Lawyer & school teacher	Killed at the Battle of Shiloh	
Harvey W. Emery	October 13, 1862	34	Member of the Wisconsin State Assembly (1861)	Republican	Union	Lawyer	Died of disease in second year of the war	
Asa W. Farr	October 6, 1863	42	Member of the Wisconsin State Assembly (1856–57)	Democrat	Union	Lawyer	Killed at the Battle of Baxter Springs	
Daniel E. Frost	July 19, 1864	45	Member of the West Virginia House of Delegates (1861–62); Member of the Virginia House of Delegates (1859–61; 1855–57)	Republican	Union	Journalist	Killed at the Battle of Cool Spring	
John Gregg	October 7, 1864	36	Deputy from Texas to the Provisional Congress of the Confederate States (1861–62)	Democrat	Confederacy	Judge	Killed at the Battle of Darbytown and New Market Roads	
Stephen F. Hale	July 18, 1862	46	Deputy from Alabama to the Provisional Congress of the Confederate States (1861–62); Member of the Alabama Senate (1857–61; 1843–45)	Democrat	Confederacy	Lawyer	Killed at the Battle of Gaines' Mill	
Louis P. Harvey	April 19, 1862	41	Governor of Wisconsin (1862); Secretary of State of Wisconsin (1860–62); Member of the Wisconsin Senate (1854–58)	Republican	Union	Newspaper editor	Drowned while trying to step from a tethered boat to a moving steamboat	
Robert H. Hatton	May 31, 1862	35	Member of U.S. House of Representatives from Tennessee's 5th district (1859–61); Member of the Tennessee House of Representatives (1855–57)	Whig & Opposition	Confederacy	Lawyer	Killed at the Battle of Seven Pines	
Philemon T. Herbert	July 23, 1864	38	Member of U.S. House of Representatives from California's at-large district (1855–57); Member of the California State Assembly (1853–55)	Democrat	Confederacy	Lawyer	Died from injuries sustained at the Battle of Mansfield	
John Edwin Holmes	May 8, 1863	53	Lieutenant Governor of Wisconsin (1848–50); Member of the Wisconsin State Assembly (1853–54)	Democrat (before 1856); Republican (after 1856)	Union	Lawyer & minister	Died from illness acquired while a prisoner at Libby Prison	
James S. Jackson	October 8, 1862	39	Member of U.S. House of Representatives from Kentucky's 2nd district (1861)	Unionist	Union	Lawyer	Killed at the Battle of Perryville	
Albert G. Jenkins	May 21, 1864	33	Member of U.S. House of Representatives from Virginia's 11th district (1857–61)	Democrat	Confederacy	Lawyer & planter	Died from injuries acquired at the Battle of Gettysburg and Battle of Cloyd's Mountain	
George W. Johnson	April 8, 1862	50	Confederate Governor of Kentucky (1861–62); Member of the Kentucky House of Representatives (1838–40)	Democrat	Confederacy	Lawyer & farmer	Killed at the Battle of Shiloh	
Albert Sidney Johnston	April 6, 1862	59	Secretary of War for the Republic of Texas (1838–40)		Confederacy	Military officer	Killed at the Battle of Shiloh	
William High Keim	May 18, 1862	48	Surveyor General of Pennsylvania (1860–61); Member of U.S. House of Representatives from Pennsylvania's 8th district (1858–59); Mayor of Reading, Pennsylvania (1848–49)	Whig	Union	Military officer	Died of typhus while serving as a general in the Union Army	
Laurence M. Keitt	June 2, 1864	39	Member of the Confederate Provisional Congress from South Carolina (1861–62); Member of U.S. House of Representatives from South Carolina's 3rd district (1853–60); Member of the South Carolina House of Representatives (1848–53)	Democrat	Confederacy	Lawyer & planter	Killed at the Battle of Cold Harbor	
John Basil Lamar	September 15, 1862	49	Member of U.S. House of Representatives from Georgia's at-large district (1843); Member of the Georgia House of Representatives (1837–38)	Democrat	Confederacy	Lawyer & planter	Died from injuries acquired at the Battle of Crampton's Gap	
Thomas Marshall	1861	~35	Member of the Maine Senate (1859–60); Member of the Maine House of Representatives (1857–58)	Republican	Union	Merchant	Died from fever acquired while serving in the 7th Maine Infantry Regiment	
Benjamin McCulloch	March 7, 1862	50	Member of the Texas House of Representatives (1846); Member of the Republic of Texas House of Representatives (1839–42)		Confederacy	Military officer	Killed at the Battle of Pea Ridge	
Randal William McGavock	May 12, 1863	36	Mayor of Nashville, Tennessee (1858–59)		Confederacy	Lawyer & planter	Killed at the Battle of Raymond	
David McKee	December 31, 1862	34	Member of the Wisconsin State Assembly (1852–53)	Democrat (before 1855); Republican (after 1855)	Union	Lawyer & pioneer	Killed at the Battle of Stones River	
Burton Millard	April 7, 1862	~34	Member of the Wisconsin State Assembly (1858–59)	Republican	Union	Machinist	Killed while on duty in Lee's Mill Earthworks, Virginia	
Sydenham Moore	August 20, 1862	45	Member of U.S. House of Representatives from Alabama's 4th district (1857–61)	Democrat	Confederacy	Lawyer	Killed at Battle of Seven Pines	
Isaac Parsons	April 24, 1862	48	Member of Virginia House of Delegates (1854–57)	Democrat	Confederacy	Planter	Died during a skirmish with Union Army cavalry near Grassy Lick Run	
Horace Patch	June 22, 1862	47	Member of Wisconsin State Assembly (????–1852)	Democrat	Union	Lawyer	Died from injuries acquired at the Battle of Pittsburg Landing	
George W. Pratt	September 11, 1862	32	Member of New York State Senate (1853–54)	Democrat	Union	Leather manufacturer	Died from injuries acquired at the Second Battle of Bull Run	
Samuel Allen Rice	July 6, 1864	36	Attorney General of Iowa (1856–61)	Republican	Union	Lawyer	Died from injuries acquired at the Battle of Jenkins' Ferry	
Francis M. Rotch	November 28, 1863	41	Member of New York State Senate (1860–61)		Union	Farmer	Died from fever contracted while serving in the Army of the Potomac	
Thomas Hart Ruffin	October 17, 1863	43	Member of U.S. House of Representatives from North Carolina's 2nd district (1853–61)	Democrat	Confederacy	Lawyer	Died from injuries acquired at the Battle of Bristoe Station	
Nicholas J. Rusch	September 22, 1864	42	Lieutenant Governor of Iowa (1860–62); Member of the Iowa Senate (1858–60)	Republican	Union	Tutor & farmer		
Robert Eden Scott	May 3, 1862	54	Member of the Virginia House of Delegates (1839–42; 1845–49; 1850–52)	Whig	Confederacy	Lawyer & planter	Killed by Union deserters when he confronted them for using his land	
Henry Marchmore Shaw	February 1, 1864	44	Member of U.S. House of Representatives from North Carolina's 1st district (1853–55; 1857–59)	Democrat	Confederacy	Doctor	Shot while assembling other Confederate troops for an expedition	
Eliakim Sherrill	July 4, 1863	50	Member of U.S. House of Representatives from New York's 10th district (1847–49); Member of the New York Senate (1854–55)	Whig & Republican	Union	Tanner	Died from injuries acquired at the Battle of Gettysburg	
Isaac Stevens	September 1, 1862	44	Governor of Washington Territory (1853–57); Delegate to the U.S. House of Representatives from Washington Territory's at-large district (1857–61)	Democrat	Union	Military officer	Killed at the Battle of Chantilly	
Richard Hanson Weightman	August 10, 1861	44	Member of U.S. House of Representatives from New Mexico Territory's at-large district (1851–53)	Democrat	Confederacy	Military officer	Killed at the Battle of Wilson's Creek	
William Sydney Wilson	November 3, 1862	45	Member of the Mississippi Legislature (1858–59; 1860–61)	Democrat	Confederacy		Died from injuries acquired at the Battle of Antietam	
John Wimer	January 11, 1863	52	Mayor of St. Louis, Missouri (1843–44; 1857–58)	Democrat	Confederacy	Blacksmith	Killed at the Battle of Hartville	
David E. Wood	June 17, 1862	38	Member of the Wisconsin State Assembly (1850–51)	Whig (before 1854); Republican (after 1854)	Union	Lawyer	Died of unspecified disease	
Felix Zollicoffer	January 19, 1862	49	Member of U.S. House of Representatives from Tennessee's 8th district (1853–59); Member of the Tennessee Senate (1849–52)	Whig & American	Confederacy	Newspaper owner and editor	Killed at the Battle of Mill Springs	
Abraham Lincoln	April 14, 1865	56	16th President of the United States (1861–1865); Member of the U.S. House of Representatives from Illinois's 7th district (1847–1849); Member of the Illinois House of Representatives from Sangamon County (1834–1842)	Whig (before 1856); Republican (after 1856)	Union	Lawyer	Shot in the head by John Wilkes Booth while watching the stage play Our American Cousin at Ford's Theatre in Washington, D.C.	
