= Teddy O'Connor (disambiguation) =

Teddy O'Connor was a hurler.

Teddy O'Connor may also refer to:

- Teddy O'Connor (Gaelic footballer)
- Teddy O'Connor (horse)

== See also ==
- Edward O'Connor (disambiguation)
