= Teddy O'Connor (Gaelic footballer) =

Irish Gaelic footballer

Personal information
- Native name: Éamonn Ó Conchubhair (Irish)
- Born: 1920 Killorglin, County Kerry, Ireland
- Died: 11 December 1995 (aged 75) Killarney, County Kerry, Ireland
- Occupation: Publican
- Height: 5 ft 9 in (175 cm)

Sport
- Sport: Gaelic football
- Position: Midfield
Clubs
- Years: Club
- Laune Rangers; Bantry Blues; 21st Battalion; Dick Fitzgerald; Dr. Crokes; Killarney
Club titles
- Kerry titles: 2
Inter-county
Years	County	Apps (scores)
1946-1952	Kerry	17 (1-04)
Inter-county titles
- Munster titles: 4
- All-Irelands: 1
- NFL: 0

Teddy O'Connor (1920 – 11 December 1995) was an Irish Gaelic footballer who played for a number of clubs sides including Laune Rangers, Bantry Blues, Dr. Crokes and Killarney and at inter-county level with the Kerry senior football team.

== Career ==
O'Connor first came to prominence as a Gaelic footballer as a schoolboy in his hometown of Killorglin. As an 18-year-old in 1938 he was a member of the Kerry minor team that lost the All-Ireland semi-final to Cavan. O'Connor briefly played with club side Laune Rangers, however, after joining the Irish Army he transferred to Bantry Blues and later won a Cork Junior Championship title with the 21st Battalion. He also lined out for Dick Fitzgeralds and Dr. Crokes around this time. O'Connor made his first appearance at inter-county level with Kerry during the 1946 Munster Championship. He won four Munster Championship medals in total, and was a member of the squad which won the 1946 All-Ireland final replay by defeating Roscommon. He also lined out in the 1947 All-Ireland final defeat by Cavan at the Polo Grounds in New York. O'Connor had County Championship successes at the end of his career, firstly with Killarney in 1949 and again with the reformed Dick Fitzgeralds club in 1951. He also won two Railway Cup medals with Munster.

== Personal life and death ==
O'Connor was born in Killorglin, County Kerry. After a period in the Irish Army during the Emergency, he later worked as a publican in Killarney. He died on 11 December 1995.

== Honours ==
21st Battalion

- Cork Junior Football Championship: 1944

Killarney

- Kerry Senior Football Championship: 1949

Dick Fitzgeralds

- Kerry Senior Football Championship: 1951

Kerry

- All-Ireland Senior Football Championship: 1946
- Munster Senior Football Championship: 1946, 1947, 1948, 1950
- Munster Minor Football Championship: 1938

Munster

- Railway Cup: 1948, 1949 (c)
