= Dinny Lyne =

Kerry Gaelic footballer (1920–2001)

Personal information
- Native name: Donncha Ó Laighin (Irish)
- Born: 1920 Killarney, County Kerry, Ireland
- Died: 29 November 2001 (aged 81) Killarney, County Kerry, Ireland
- Occupation: Farmer
- Height: 5 ft 9 in (175 cm)

Sport
- Sport: Gaelic football
- Position: Left corner-back
Club
- Years: Club
- Killarney Legion
Club titles
- Kerry titles: 1
Inter-county
Years	County	Apps (scores)
1944-1948	Kerry	18 (0-00)
Inter-county titles
- Munster titles: 3
- All-Irelands: 1
- NFL: 0

Denis J. Lyne (1920 – 29 November 2001) was an Irish Gaelic footballer who played for club side Killarney Legion and at inter-county level with the Kerry senior football team.

== Career ==
Lyne first came to prominence as a Gaelic footballer as a member of the Kerry junior team that won the All-Ireland Junior Championship in 1941. He made his first appearance with the Kerry senior side during the 1944 Munster Championship. Lyne won three Munster Championship medals in total, however, the highlight of his brief inter-county career was the 1946 All-Ireland final replay defeat of Roscommon. He also lined out as team captain in the 1947 All-Ireland final defeat by Cavan at the Polo Grounds in New York. Lyne also won a County Championship medal with Killarney Legion and a Railway Cup medal with Munster.

== Personal life and death ==
Lyne was born just outside Killarney, County Kerry and spent his entire life working on the family farm. Three of his brothers all enjoyed All-Ireland success in various grades with Kerry. Lyne's nephews, Pat, Tom and Mick Spillane, won a total of 19 All-Ireland medals with Kerry between 1975 and 1986. His grandson, Jonathan Lyne, won an All-Ireland medal with Kerry in 2014. Dinny Lyne died after a brief illness on 29 November 2001.

== Honours ==
Killarney Legion

- Kerry Senior Football Championship: 1946

Kerry

- All-Ireland Senior Football Championship: 1946
- Munster Senior Football Championship: 1944, 1946, 1947, 1948

Munster

- Railway Cup: 1948

Sporting positions
Preceded by Paddy Kennedy	Kerry Senior Football Captain; 1947	Succeeded by Joe Keohane
