= Paddy Burke (Gaelic footballer) =

Irish Gaelic footballer

Personal information
- Native name: Pádraig de Búrca (Irish)
- Born: 1921 Milltown, County Kerry, Ireland
- Died: 14 November 1955 (aged 34) Milltown, County Kerry, Ireland
- Occupation: Health inspector
- Height: 6 ft 0 in (183 cm)

Sport
- Sport: Gaelic football
- Position: Full-forward
Club
- Years: Club
- Milltown/Castlemaine
Club titles
- Kerry titles: 0
Inter-county
Years	County	Apps (scores)
1946	Kerry	6 (3-08)
Inter-county titles
- Munster titles: 1
- All-Irelands: 1
- NFL: 0

Patrick Joseph Burke (1921 – 14 November 1955) was an Irish Gaelic footballer who played for club side Milltown/Castlemaine and at inter-county level with the Kerry senior football team.

== Career ==
Club

At club level he lined out with Milltown/Castlemaine. He helped the club to win the first Mid Kerry Senior Football Championship in 1947.

== Intercounty ==
Minor

Burke lined out with Kerry at minor level in 1938. He won a Munster Minor Football Championship title scoring 1-01 in an 8-09 to 1-02 win over Cork i the final. He would go on to line out in the All-Ireland final but was on the losing side to Cavan.

Junior

He wouldn't line out with Kerry again until 1946 with the county Junior side. His only appearance being against Tipperary.

Senior

His displays withe the Junior side seen him make his first appearance at Senior inter-county level with Kerry during the 1946 Munster Championship. He won a Munster Championship medal that season, however, the highlight of his brief inter-county career was the 1946 All-Ireland final replay defeat of Roscommon.

== Personal life and death ==
Burke was born in Milltown, County Kerry and worked as a health inspector. His sporting career was cut short by illness and he died at the age of 34 on 14 November 1955.

== Honours ==
Kerry

- All-Ireland Senior Football Championship: 1946
- Munster Senior Football Championship: 1946
- Munster Minor Football Championship: 1938
