= Edward Connor =

Edward Connor may refer to:

- Edward Connor (cricketer) (1872–1947), English cricketer
- Ted Connor (1884–1955), English footballer
- Ned Connor (1850–1898), American baseball player

== See also ==
- Edward Connors (disambiguation)
- Edward O'Connor (disambiguation)
