= 1945 All-Ireland Minor Football Championship =

Gaelic football competition

Championship details

All-Ireland Champions
- Winning team: Dublin (2nd win)

All-Ireland Finalists
- Losing team: Mayo

Provincial Champions
- Munster: Kerry
- Leinster: Dublin
- Ulster: Monaghan
- Connacht: Leitrim

The 1945 All-Ireland Minor Football Championship was the 14th staging of the All-Ireland Minor Football Championship, the Gaelic Athletic Association's premier inter-county Gaelic football tournament for boys under the age of 18. As a result of the Emergency this was the first championship to be staged since 1941.

Roscommon entered the championship as defending champions, however, they were defeated in the Connacht Championship.

On 23 September 1945, Dublin won the championship following a 4-7 to 0-4 defeat of Leitrim in the All-Ireland final. This was their second All-Ireland title and their first in twelve championship seasons.

== Results ==
=== All-Ireland Minor Football Championship ===
==== Final ====
23 September 1945 Final	Dublin	4-07 - 0-04	Leitrim	Croke Park, Dublin

== Championship statistics ==
=== Miscellaneous ===
- Leitrim win the Connacht title for the first time in their history.
