= Robert N. Adams =

American general (1835–1914)

Robert Newton Adams
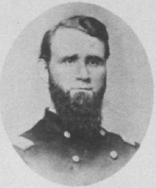
- Born: September 15, 1835; Fayette County, Ohio, U.S.
- Died: March 25, 1914 (aged 78); Saint Paul, Minnesota, U.S.
- Burial place: Lakewood Cemetery; Minneapolis, Minnesota, U.S.
- Spouse(s): Elinor W. Whipple (m. 1866; died 1900) Mary C. Compton (m. 1903)
- Children: 2
- Military career
- Allegiance: United States (Union)
- Branch: United States Army (Union Army)
- Service years: 1861–1865
- Rank: Colonel; Bvt. Brigadier General
- Unit: 20th Ohio Infantry Regiment
- Commands: 81st Ohio Infantry Regiment
- Conflicts: American Civil War; Western Theater; Battle of Shiloh; Siege of Corinth; Battle of Town Creek; Atlanta campaign; Battle of Resaca; Battle of Dallas; Battle of Kennesaw Mountain; Battle of Nickajack Creek; Battle of Atlanta; Battle of Jonesborough; Battle of Hobkirk's Hill

Robert Newton Adams (September 15, 1835 – March 25, 1914) was an American Brevet Brigadier General during the American Civil War. He commanded the 81st Ohio Infantry Regiment throughout the later years of the war and participated in the Federal Penetration up the Cumberland and Tennessee Rivers and the Atlanta campaign.

== Early years ==
Robert was born on September 15, 1835, at a farm in Fayette County, Ohio as the son of Albert Adams and Nancy Verdie Coffey Adams as well as a descendant of the Douglas family. Adams spent his childhood at his parents barn before attending the Greenfield School there.

== American Civil War ==
In 1858, he enrolled in Miami University but during his junior year, the American Civil War broke out. After graduating, Adams enlisted in the 20th Ohio Infantry Regiment on April 18, 1861, as a part of the "University Rifles" (Later known as Company C) which was mustered in Oxford, Ohio for a tenure of 3 months. After his initial tenure expired, August 30, 1861, Adams was made Captain of the new 81st Ohio Infantry Regiment of Company C. Adams was promoted to Lieutenant Colonel on May 7, 1862, and on August 8, 1864, to Colonel. Adams saw active combat at the battles of Shiloh and Corinth, Town Creek, Resaca, Dallas, Kennesaw Mountain, Nickajack Creek, Atlanta, Jonesborough and Hobkirk's Hill. Adams was then brevetted Brigadier General on March 13, 1865, for "meritorious services during the war". Adams was then honorably mustered out with his regiment on July 13, 1865, at Louisville, Kentucky.

== Later career ==
After the war, Adams studied in the Allegheny Theological Seminary and gained his license by 1869. He then became a pastor from 1869 to 1875 in Ohio and Kansas. Adams then moved to Minnesota and worked at Fergus Falls. Adams was then made Superintendent of Home Missions in 1886 and would hold that position for 21 years.

== Personal life ==
Adams married Elinor W. Whipple on December 27, 1866. She died in 1900. He married Mary C. Compton on March 3, 1903. He had two daughters, Mabel and Maude.

Adams died on March 25, 1914, at his home on Marshall Avenue in Merriam Park, Saint Paul. He was buried at Lakewood Cemetery.

== See also ==
- List of American Civil War brevet generals (Union)
