= Patrick E. Burke =

American politician

Patrick Emmet Burke
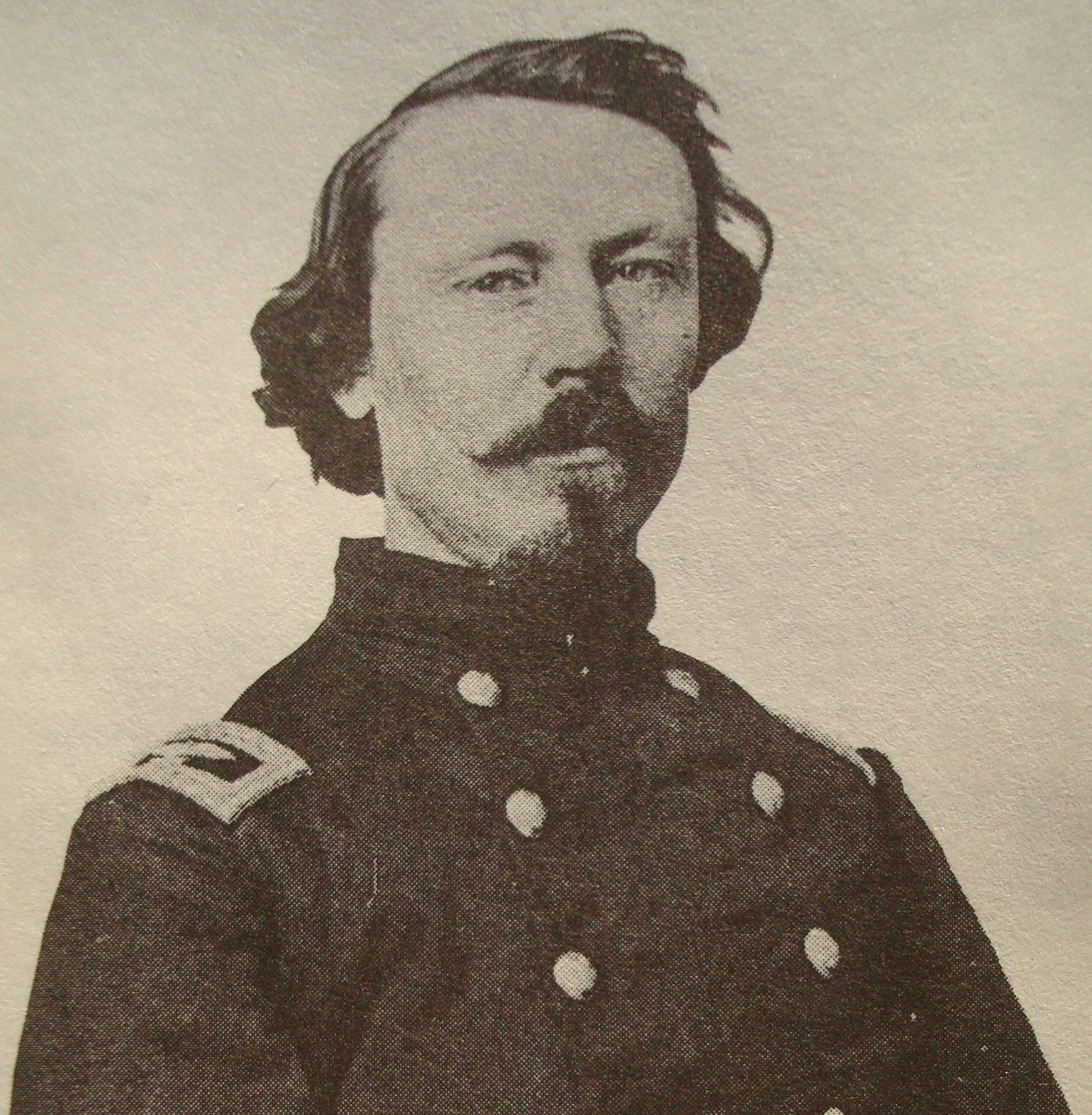
- Colonel Patrick Emmet Burke
- Born: County Tipperary, Ireland
- Died: Resaca, Georgia
- Burial place: Calvary Cemetery; St. Louis, Missouri
- Military career
- Allegiance: United States of America
- Branch: United States Army; Union Army
- Service years: 1861–1864
- Rank: Colonel
- Commands: Western Sharpshooters Regt; Commander: 2nd Brigade, 2nd Division, Left Wing, XVI Corps, Army of the Tennessee
- Conflicts: American Civil War: Camp Jackson Affair; Battle of Boonville; Battle of Dug Springs; Battle of Wilson's Creek; Battle of Iuka; Second Battle of Corinth; Battle of Snake Creek Gap; Battle of Resaca; Battle of Lay's Ferry; Battle of Rome Cross Roads †

Patrick Emmet Burke (c. 1830 – May 20, 1864) was a lawyer, Missouri state legislator, and Civil War officer. He commanded the Western Sharpshooters Regiment and the 2nd Brigade, 2nd Division, XVI Corps, Army of the Tennessee.

== Early life ==
Burke was born in County Tipperary, Ireland, around 1830, the son of Walter Burke. As a child his family moved to St. Louis, Missouri. On April 8, 1846, he entered the Vincentian Seminary at St. Mary of the Barrens in Perryville, Missouri as a secular student. On April 1, 1848, he graduated with honors.

Upon returning to St. Louis, Burke became a clerk at the law firm of Glover and Richardson. He was admitted to the Missouri State Bar in 1849. After John C. Richardson was appointed a Justice of the Supreme Court of Missouri in 1857, Burke went into partnership with Samuel T. Glover (considered the dean of the St. Louis Bar).

== Pre-war activities ==
Burke became politically active as a supporter of the Benton faction of the Missouri Democratic Party, opposed to the repeal of the Missouri Compromise and the possibility of the expansion of slavery to the western territories. In 1855 he was elected to the 19th Missouri General Assembly as a Benton Democrat, a member of the St. Louis contingent.

In addition to his legal and political activities, Burke was an active participant in the St. Louis' pre-war militia organizations. Burke was elected 1st lieutenant of the prestigious Washington Blues militia company, serving until February 1861.

== Early war activities ==
Burke resigned from the Washington Blues in February 1861, apparently due to the secessionist views of most of its members. Shortly thereafter he became associated with underground pro-Unionist volunteers organized by Congressman Francis Preston Blair Jr. When the volunteers were mustered into Federal service in March–April 1861, Burke was appointed captain of Company K, 1st Missouri Volunteer Infantry (3 Months).

On May 10, 1861, Burke participated in the capture of the Missouri Volunteer Militia at Camp Jackson on the western edge of St. Louis, and the subsequent lethal riot in the streets of the city which became known as the Camp Jackson Affair.

In the midst of the violence and tension of the Missouri secession crisis, Burke married 27-year-old Catherine Mackay, daughter of a wealthy surveyor with connections to socially prominent French members of the St. Louis elite. They were married on May 28, 1861, at Assumption Roman Catholic Church, by Father P. J. Ryan.

After the June 11 collapse of the Price–Harney Truce, Burke, leading Company K, 1st Missouri Volunteers, participated in the successful campaign to capture the state capital at Jefferson City and in defeat of a force of secessionist Missouri State Guard at the small, but strategically important Battle of Boonville.

Burke participated in General Lyon's campaign in pursuit of Maj. Gen. Sterling Price's Missouri State Guard, fighting in the Battle of Dug Spring on August 2, 1861. On August 10, Burke fought on Bloody Hill at Battle of Wilson's Creek, and was mentioned in Maj. S. D. Sturgis' official report for his leadership in the Federal counterattack which stabilized the federal line during the final southern assault.

After the Federal forces retreated to Rolla, Burke returned to St. Louis and, on orders from Maj. Gen. John C. Frémont participated in the reorganization of the 1st Missouri Infantry into the 1st Missouri Light Artillery.

In late 1861 Burke (who held a Missouri state captain's commission) was awarded a rare "regular" commission as a 1st lieutenant in the newly formed 13th U.S. Infantry, under Col. William Tecumseh Sherman (retroactively effective on May 14, 1861). Subsequently, he was promoted to captain (regular army) in the 14th U.S. Infantry, effective from October 24, 1861.

== Regimental and brigade command ==
In June 1862 Burke was appointed colonel of the "Western Sharpshooters-Fourteenth Missouri Volunteers" by Provisional Missouri Governor Hamilton Rowen Gamble. In July, he took command of the Western Sharpshooters at Corinth, Mississippi. The regiment had a mixed reputation for hard fighting and indiscipline. Burke worked to reorganize, drill, and professionalize the unique multi-state regiment.

On October 3–4, 1862 Burke personally led the Western Sharpshooters in two days of bitter skirmishes during the Second Battle of Corinth. After the battle Maj. Gen. William S. Rosecrans appointed Burke as Commandant of Corinth, responsible for securing the town, Confederate prisoners, stragglers, and dealing with the large numbers of casualties from both armies.

Over the next eleven months Burke shared command of the Corinth Military District. His regiment built Camp Davies, a stockaded outpost six miles south of Corinth. The Western Sharpshooters, and other troops under Burke's command, scouted and raided into southern Mississippi and western Alabama.

In December 1863, the majority of the regiment (now designated the 66th Illinois Volunteer Infantry [Western Sharpshooters]) reenlisted as veterans. At the same time, members of the regiment began purchasing the new sixteen-shot Henry Repeating Rifle using their own funds. Burke supported this effort, which eventually added 250 of these advanced weapons to the unit, the second largest private purchase of the war.

In April, Burke was appointed to command of 2nd Brigade, Second Division, Left Wing, XVI Corps, Army of the Tennessee. His brigade consisted of the 66th Illinois, 9th Illinois Mounted Infantry, 12th Illinois Infantry, and 81st Ohio Infantry. These units had operated together since the Battle of Fort Donelson.

== Atlanta Campaign ==
Burke led his brigade during opening portions of the Atlanta Campaign, leading from the front. As usual, the 66th Illinois was used as scout-skirmishers, but were employed as shock troops due to the regiment's high morale and the volume of fire they could generate with their newly purchased sixteen-shot Henry Repeating Rifles. On May 9, on Maj. Gen. Sherman's orders, McPherson's XVI Corps attacked through Snake Creek Gap in an attempt to cut Confederate Gen. Joseph E. Johnston's railroad supply line at Resaca, Georgia. The unexpected attack through the Gap succeeded, and the regiment advanced on Col. Burke's orders, single-handedly capturing the lightly held heights above Resaca. Maj. Gen. James B. McPherson, concerned that his exposed troops might be cut off, ordered his forces which included Burke's advanced brigade, back to Snake Creek Gap.

Sherman, learning that Snake Creek Gap was open, pulled the majority of his forces out the fight at Rocky Face Ridge, and swung around to approach Resaca through Snake Creek. Johnston reacted by pulling back to the fortified lines at Resaca.

McPherson ordered Brigadier General Thomas Sweeny's division to move south, and forced a crossing of the Oostanaula River at Lay's Ferry. Sweeny sent Burke forward, and on May 14 he crossed the river using elements of the 66th Illinois and the 81st Ohio. However, Sweeny received erroneous reports that made him think that a Confederate counterattack might cut off his division and he recalled Burke's Brigade. The next day, Sweeny's Division recrossed the Oostanaula, against significantly heavier resistance, but pushed forward and created a fortified bridgehead.

When Johnston learned that Sweeny was across the Oostanaula, and in position to threaten the Confederate line of communication, he ordered his forces to evacuate Rasaca, and retreat south.

== Burke's last battle and death ==
XVI Corps commander Maj. Gen. Grenville M. Dodge ordered Sweeny to push forward in an attempt to strike at Johnston's army as it retreated. Sweeny's Division represented the furthest extension of Sherman's army. Burke was ordered to push forward toward Rome-Calhoun Road and the Sugar Valley-Adairsville Road, near Calhoun, Georgia. Burke's forward-most unit was Company G, 66th Illinois, under the command of Captain George Taylor. Taylor advanced his men beyond the crossroads, triggering a counterattack led by the 24th Georgia Infantry and the 1st Battalion Georgia Sharpshooters, resulting in the Battle of Rome Cross Roads. The Georgians overwhelmed Taylor's men and threatened to punch through the attenuated Federal skirmish line. Burke hurried the rest of the 66th Illinois and 81st Ohio forward to blunt the Confederate attack. As he was organizing the defense, Burke was struck in the left leg by a bullet which shattered the bone. Burke turned over command of the brigade to Lieutenant Colonel Robert N. Adams, commander of the 81st Ohio and withdrew from the battlefield.

Patrick Burke's left leg was amputated below the knee, but gangrene set in and he died four days later on May 20 in an ambulance at Resaca. Burke was buried on June 5, 1864, in his family plot at Calvary Cemetery in St. Louis.
