= Battle of Rome Cross Roads =

Battle of the American Civil War

- Part of the American Civil War
Date	May 16, 1864 – May 17, 1864 (1 day)
Location	Gordon County, Georgia near Calhoun, Georgia 34.533017°N 84.936400°W
Result	Inconclusive; Successful Confederate delaying action

Belligerents
United States (Union)	(Confederate States of America) CSA (Confederacy)

Commanders and leaders
Grenville M. Dodge	William J. Hardee

Units involved
Army of the Tennessee	Army of Tennessee

The Battle of Rome Cross Roads, also known as Battle of Rome Crossroads, Skirmish at Rome Crossroads, or Action at Rome Cross-Roads was part of the Atlanta campaign of the American Civil War. It was fought in Gordon County, Georgia, a short distance west of Calhoun, Georgia, on May 16, 1864. The battle was a limited engagement between Union Army units of the Army of the Tennessee and Confederate States Army units of the Army of Tennessee in the aftermath of the Battle of Resaca, Georgia.

The Battle of Rome Cross Roads ended inconclusively with the Confederate Army units withdrawing. However, the Confederate force achieved the tactical objective of delaying Union Army pursuit. This allowed the Confederate wagon train and separated units of the Confederate force to reach the rendezvous point of Adairsville, Georgia, without being overtaken and attacked by Union forces after the Confederates had withdrawn from their defenses around Resaca, Georgia.

== Battle ==
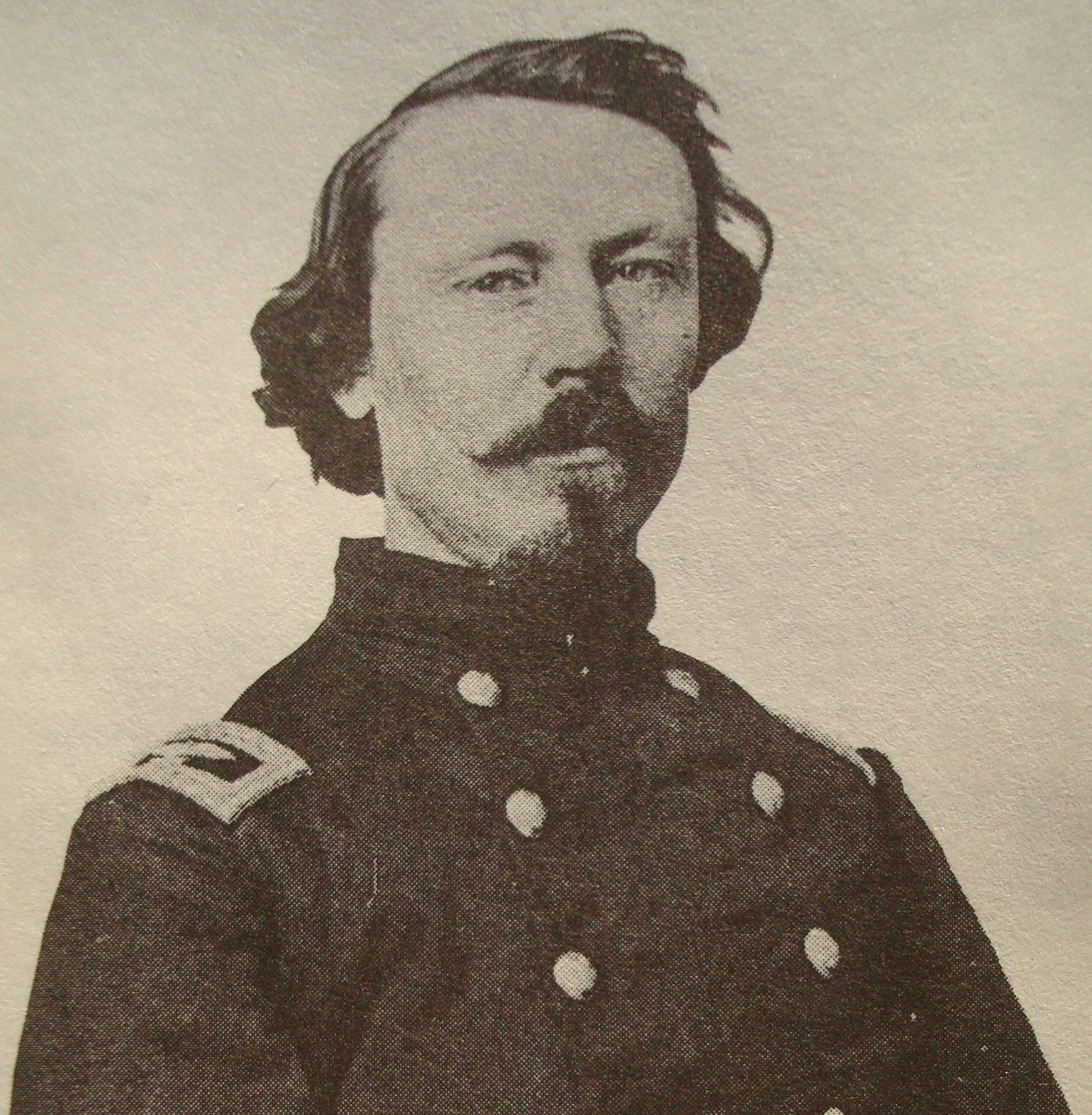
Colonel Patrick Emmet Burke

Union armies of the Military Division of the Mississippi under the command of Major General William T. Sherman engaged the Confederate Army of Tennessee under the command of General Joseph E. Johnston at the Battle of Resaca, Georgia on May 13–15, 1864. After two days of inconclusive but heavy and bloody combat, Union forces outflanked the Confederates by crossing the Oostanaula River, at Lay's Ferry, forcing the Confederates to withdraw from their advanced positions at Resaca. Both the Confederate forces and pursuing Union forces divided into three sections to hasten their movements south.

On May 16, 1864, the Union Army's 2nd Division, commanded by Brigadier General Thomas W. Sweeny, of Major General Grenville M. Dodge's XVI Corps, was the leading unit of the Army of the Tennessee in pursuit of the retreating Confederates of Lieutenant General William J. Hardee's Corp. The 2nd Division of the XVI Corps moved toward the intersection of the Rome-Calhoun Road and the Sugar Valley-Adairsville Road, near Calhoun, Georgia, in an attempt to cut off Hardee's Corps, including Confederate wagon trains. Hardee's Corps and the wagon trains were moving toward a rendezvous at Adairsville, Georgia with the other Confederate units that had withdrawn from Resaca.

General Johnston sent Hardee's Corps to block the Union advance and to protect the Confederate wagon train's withdrawal from Resaca. Hardee's Corps took up positions in the woods south of the Rome-Calhoun Road near the crossroad and anchored their line on Oothkalooga Creek.

As the leading Union skirmishers, Company G from the 66th Illinois Volunteer Infantry Regiment (Western Sharpshooters), formerly Birge's Western Sharpshooters and later the "Western Sharpshooters-14th Missouri Volunteers", under the command of Captain George Taylor, advanced toward the crossroad, the Confederates launched a surprise attack from the woods. The 24th Georgia Volunteer Infantry Regiment and the 1st Battalion Georgia Sharpshooters and the 16th South Carolina Infantry Regiment led the attack.

The Confederates drove Taylor's men back and killed Taylor as he was trying to steady the defense. Colonel Patrick E. Burke, commander of the 2nd Brigade, 2nd Division, XVI Corps, rushed the other companies of the 66th Illinois Infantry Regiment and the 81st Ohio Infantry Regiment forward to support Company G, which had checked the Confederate advance after Company G had fallen back a short distance following the initial Confederate attack. As he organized the Union regiments, Burke was mortally wounded by a bullet which shattered the bone in his left leg. Lieutenant Colonel Robert N. Adams, commander of the 81st Ohio Infantry Regiment, took command of the brigade and the Union force withdrew a short distance from the battlefield. Then the Confederates directed artillery fire on the Union supply train and empty caissons that were following the leading troops.

The Confederates held their position and delayed the Union advance until the Confederate wagon trains made it through Calhoun, Georgia and were on their way south to Adairsville, Georgia.

Although the Union force suffered only about 50 casualties, the loss of 2nd Brigade, 2nd Division commander, Colonel Patrick E. Burke, formerly commander of the 66th Illinois Infantry Regiment, who was mortally wounded and died soon after the battle, was significant.

== Aftermath ==
Hardee's Corps withdrew toward Adairsville during the early hours of May 17, 1864. On May 17, 1864, the two armies met in combat again at the Battle of Adairsville, Georgia and in fighting at Rome, Georgia.
