= Monastery of the Glorious Ascension =

Monastery in Georgia, United States

Coordinates: 34°37′15″N 84°57′8″W

- Monastery of the Glorious Ascension
- Country: United States

History
- Founded: 1966

The Monastery of the Glorious Ascension is a cenobitic women's monastery of the Russian Orthodox Church Outside of Russia.

Popularly known as "Ascension Monastery", the Monastery of the Glorious Ascension is located in Resaca, Georgia, about 60 miles northwest of Atlanta along I-75, near Dalton, Georgia. The monastery was founded in 1966 and was received into the Orthodox Church in America in August 1977. In 1980, the Brotherhood moved from Mississippi to Resaca, Georgia. After 20 years in the OCA (Orthodox Church in America), the Brotherhood entered the Russian Orthodox Church Outside Russia (ROCOR).

In 2003, after receiving a canonical release from Metropolitan Laurus of the Russian Orthodox Church Outside Russia (ROCOR), the Ascension Monastery was received into the Patriarchate of Jerusalem from ROCOR and made part of the Brotherhood of the Holy Sepulchre, which is the Brotherhood from the Monastery of Mar Sabbas in the Judean Desert and is responsible for maintaining and protecting the Church of the Holy Sepulchre and other holy sites and shrines in the Holy Land.

Following the dissolution of the parishes of the Jerusalem Patriarchate in North America and the establishment of the Vicariate for Palestinian-Jordanian Communities in the USA, the monastery was once again received into the ROCOR in October 2010.

The monastery is a convent for female monastics. Liturgical functions and services are administered by Priest Laurence Powell.

Being an intentional Orthodox community, Saturday and Sunday worship services are open to the public and a schedule of these services is available on the monastery webpage. Guided retreats (individual & groups) are available to those who want to delve deeper into their relationship with Christ within a monastic setting.
