= Frank O'Keeffe (Gaelic footballer) =

Irish Gaelic footballer

Personal information
- Native name: Prionsias Ó Caoimh (Irish)
- Born: 1923 Tralee, County Kerry, Ireland
- Died: 25 March 2014 (aged 90–91) Tralee, County Kerry, Ireland
- Occupation: Furniture salesman

Sport
- Sport: Gaelic football
- Position: Left corner-forward
Club
- Years: Club
- John Mitchels
Club titles
- Kerry titles: 2
Inter-county
| Years | County | Apps (scores) |
| 1946-1951 | Kerry | 7 (5-1) |
Inter-county titles
- Munster titles: 2
- All-Irelands: 1
- NFL: 0

Frank O'Keeffe (1923 - 25 March 2014) was an Irish Gaelic footballer who played as a left corner-forward for the Kerry senior team.

Born in Tralee, County Kerry, O'Keeffe first played competitive hurling during his tenure at St. Brendan's College, Killarney. He arrived on the inter-county scene when he first linked up with the Kerry minor team, before later lining out with the junior side. He made his senior debut in the 1946. O'Keeffe subsequently won one All-Ireland medal and two Munster medals. He was an All-Ireland runner-up on one occasion.

O'Keeffe represented the Munster inter-provincial team on just one occasion, winning one Railway Cup medal. At club level he won two championship medals with John Mitchels.

Throughout his inter-county career, O'Keeffe made 7 championship appearances for Kerry. His retirement came following the conclusion of the 1951 championship.

His son, John O'Keeffe, also played with Kerry, winning seven All-Ireland medals in a lengthy career.

== Honours ==
=== Team ===
John Mitchels

- Kerry Senior Football Championship (2): 1947, 1952

Kerry

- All-Ireland Senior Football Championship (1): 1946
- Munster Senior Football Championship (2): 1947, 1951
- Munster Junior Football Championship (1): 1946
- Munster Minor Football Championship (1): 1941

Munster

- Railway Cup (1): 1948
