= Edward O'Connor =

Edward O'Connor may refer to:

- Edward T. O'Connor Jr. (born 1942), American Democratic Party politician
- Eddie O'Connor (hurler) (born 1964), retired Irish sportsperson

== See also ==
- Edward Connor (disambiguation)
- Eddie O'Connor (disambiguation)
- Teddy O'Connor (disambiguation)
