= Edward Connors =

Edward Connors may refer to:

- Eddie Connors, a character on Sunset Beach
- Edward G. Connors, Irish-American associate of the Winter Hill Gang

== See also ==
- Edward Connor (disambiguation)
