= Eddie O'Connor =

Eddie O'Connor may refer to:

- Eddie O'Connor (businessman), co-founder and chief executive of Mainstream Renewable Power
- Eddie O'Connor (hurler) (born 1964), retired Irish hurler

== See also ==
- Edward O'Connor (disambiguation)
