= Resaca Confederate Cemetery =

Burial place in Gordon County, Georgia, United States

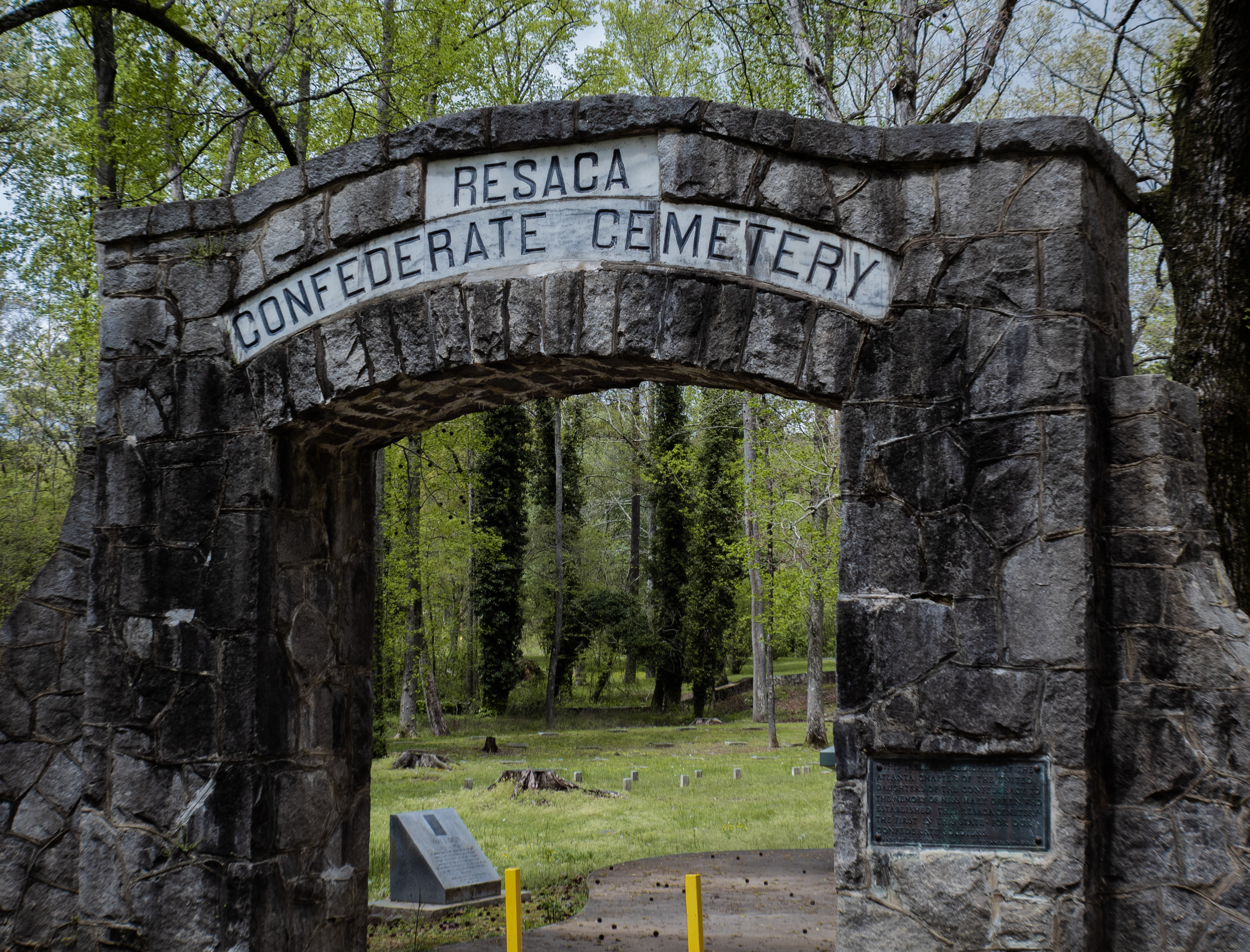
- Interactive map of Resaca Confederate Cemetery

Details
- Established: October 25, 1866
- Location: Resaca, Georgia (Gordon County)
- Country: United States
- Coordinates: 34°36′21″N 84°56′40″W
- Size: 2.5 acres (1.0 ha)
- No. of graves: More than 450
- Find a Grave: Resaca Confederate Cemetery

Resaca Confederate Cemetery in Resaca, Georgia is the burial place of over 450 Confederate soldiers who died during the American Civil War. This particular cemetery is designated for the soldiers that fought in the Battle of Resaca which took place May 14 and 15, 1864. From the two days of battle, there are only three graves where the death date is listed as May 15, 1864. The remaining graves are listed as May 14, 1864. Some of the soldiers were identified but there are still 424 graves marked "unknown".

== History ==
After the battle, John Green's family returned to their plantation and the sight that met them there was almost more than they could bear. The bodies of confederate soldiers were buried in crude makeshift graves all across the yard. Compelled by a sense of respect to those who had fallen in action, Mary J. Green and her sister began collecting the bodies to bury properly. Though poverty was rampant, the Green daughters wrote friends asking for any amount money they could give. Col. John Green, the superintendent of the Georgia Railroad, gave his daughters 2.5 acres (10,000 m^{2}) of land for use as a cemetery for these soldiers. With the money collected and the land provided, the Green daughters and their mother began work on what is now called the Resaca Confederate Cemetery.

The Resaca Confederate Cemetery was founded on October 25, 1866. This cemetery and one in Winchester, Virginia were both dedicated on the same day, with each group thinking that they were the first confederate cemetery.

== Non-military burial ==
Mrs. E. J. Simmons of Calhoun, Georgia was the president of the historical society and made many improvements on the cemetery including an iron fence to replace the previous wooden one. Mrs. Simmons was also the head of a movement to place a memorial stone in the cemetery. The memorial stone reads:

- GEORGIA CONFEDERATE VETERANS

We sleep here in obedience to law;
When duty called, we came;
When country called, we died.

Mrs. Simmons died September 5, 1907. She was buried in the Resaca Confederate Cemetery upon request.

== See also ==
- Battle of Resaca

== Gallery ==
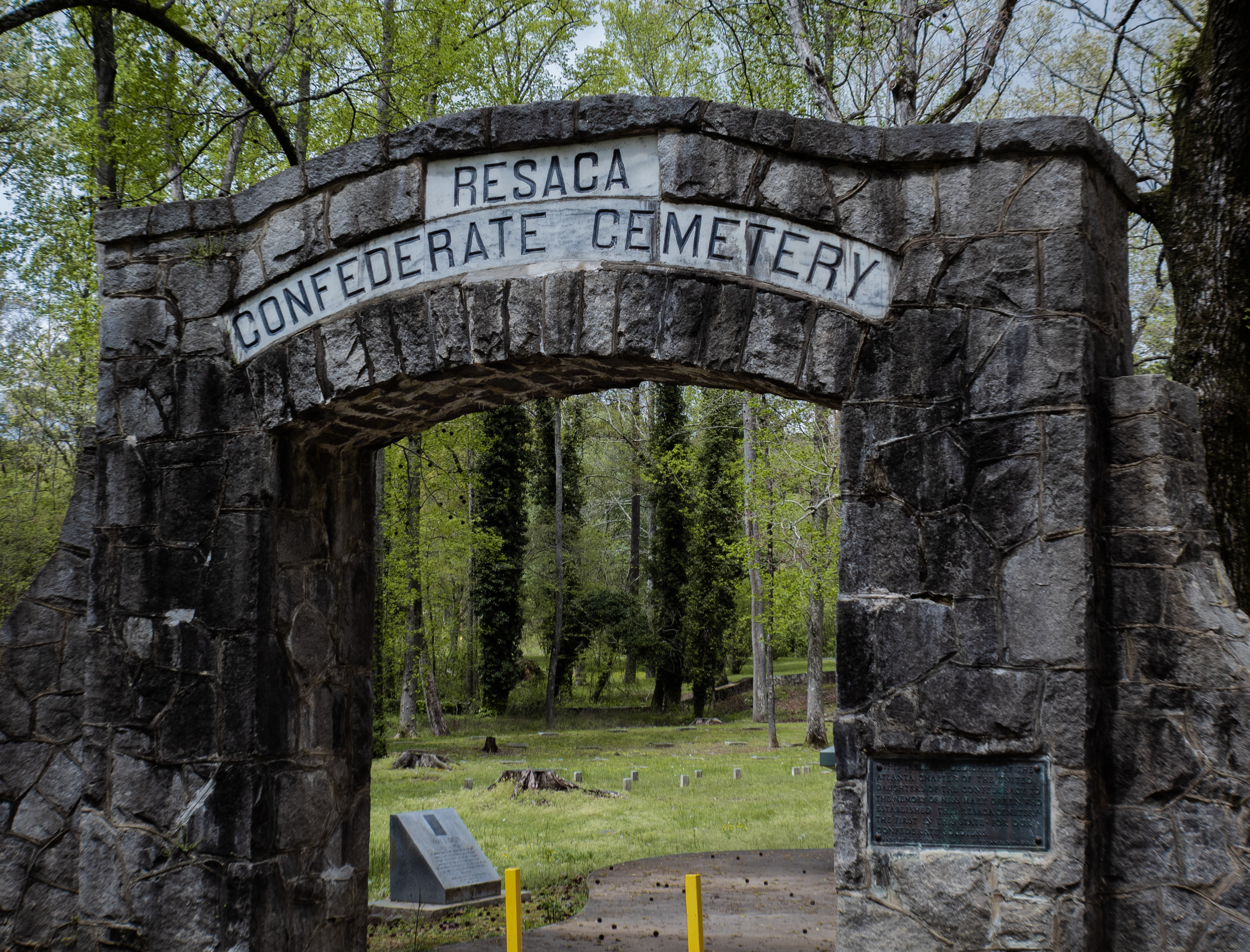
Entrance to the Resaca Confederate Cemetery

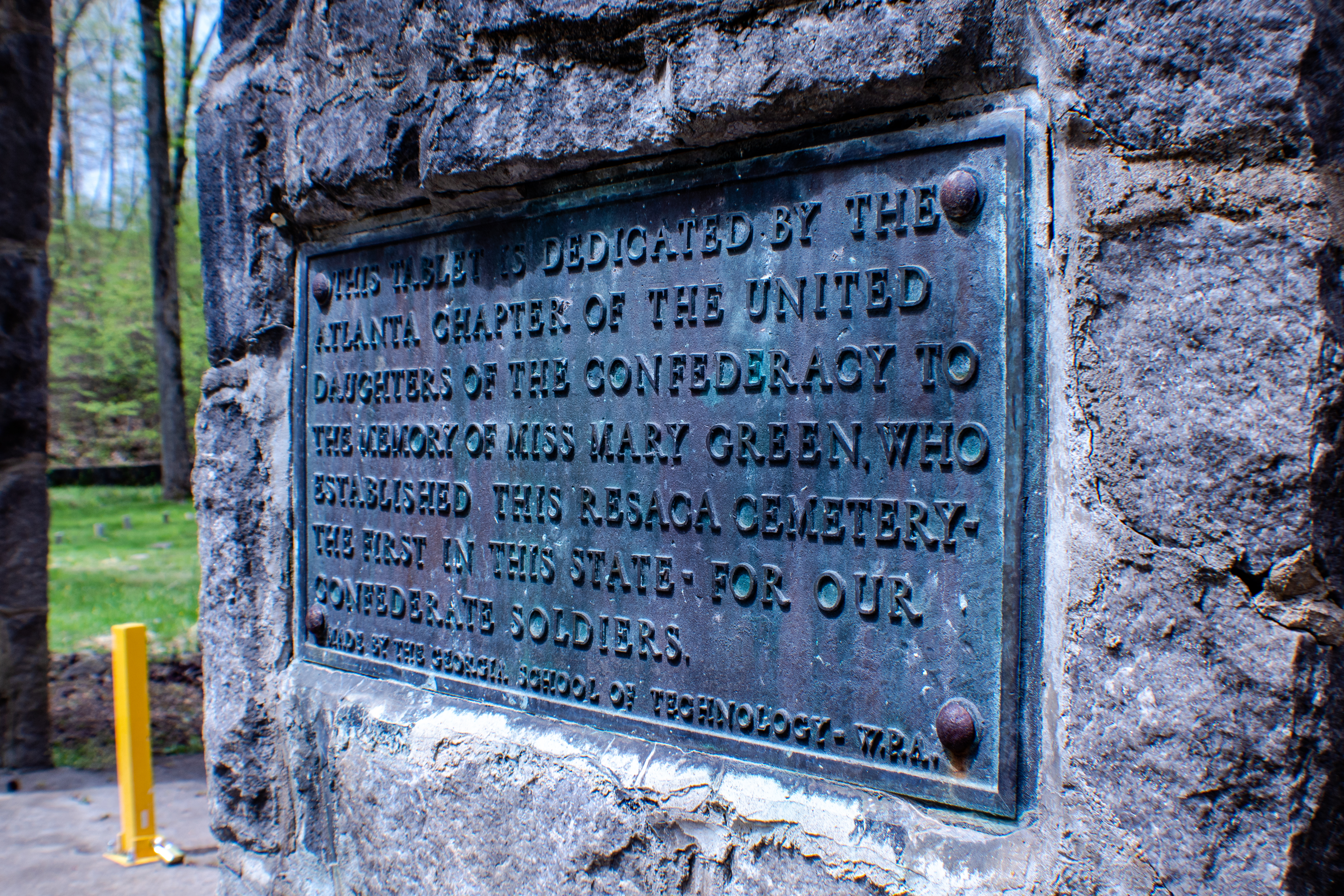
This plaque honors Mary Green who created the cemetery

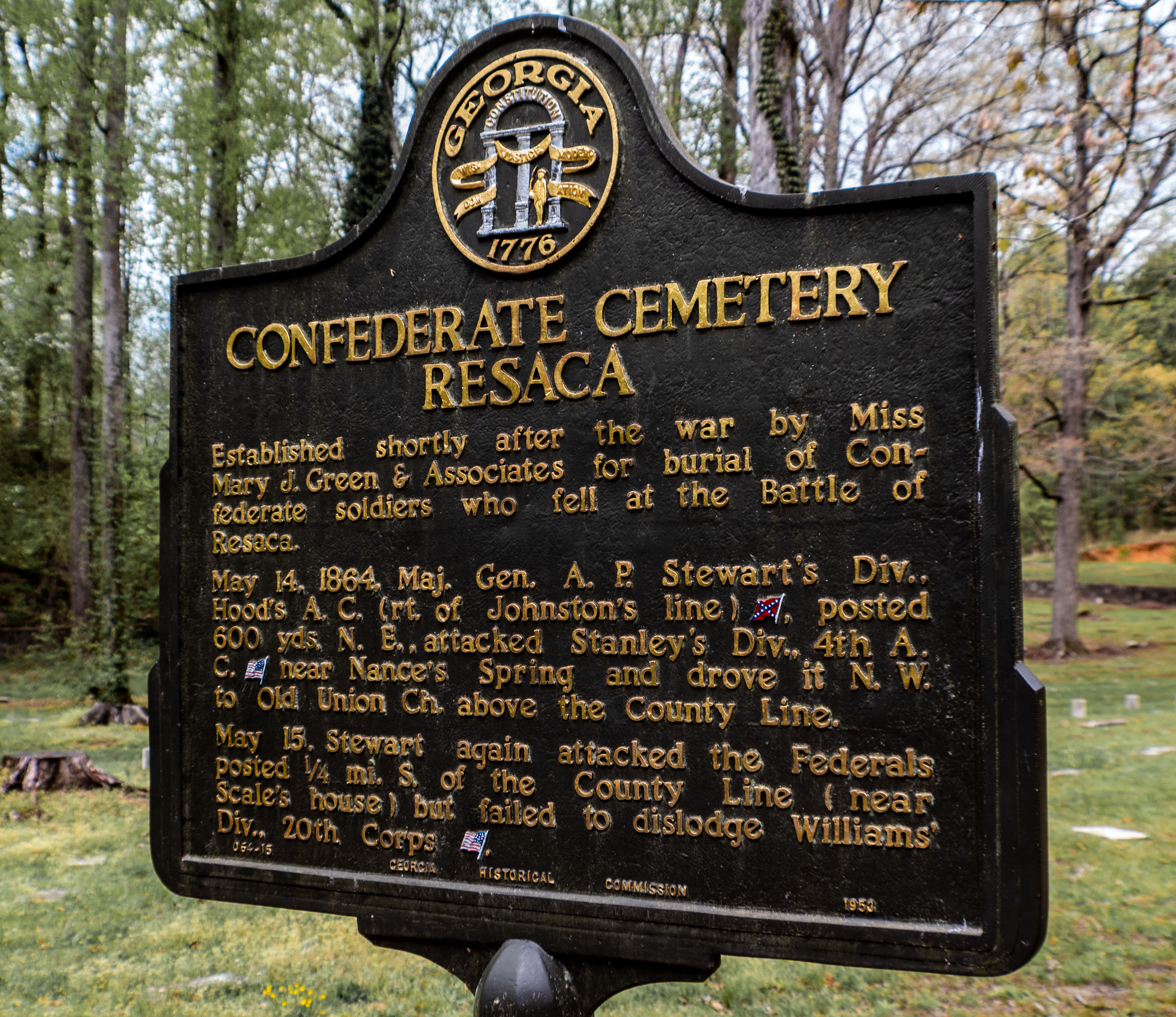
This sign describes the creation of the cemetery

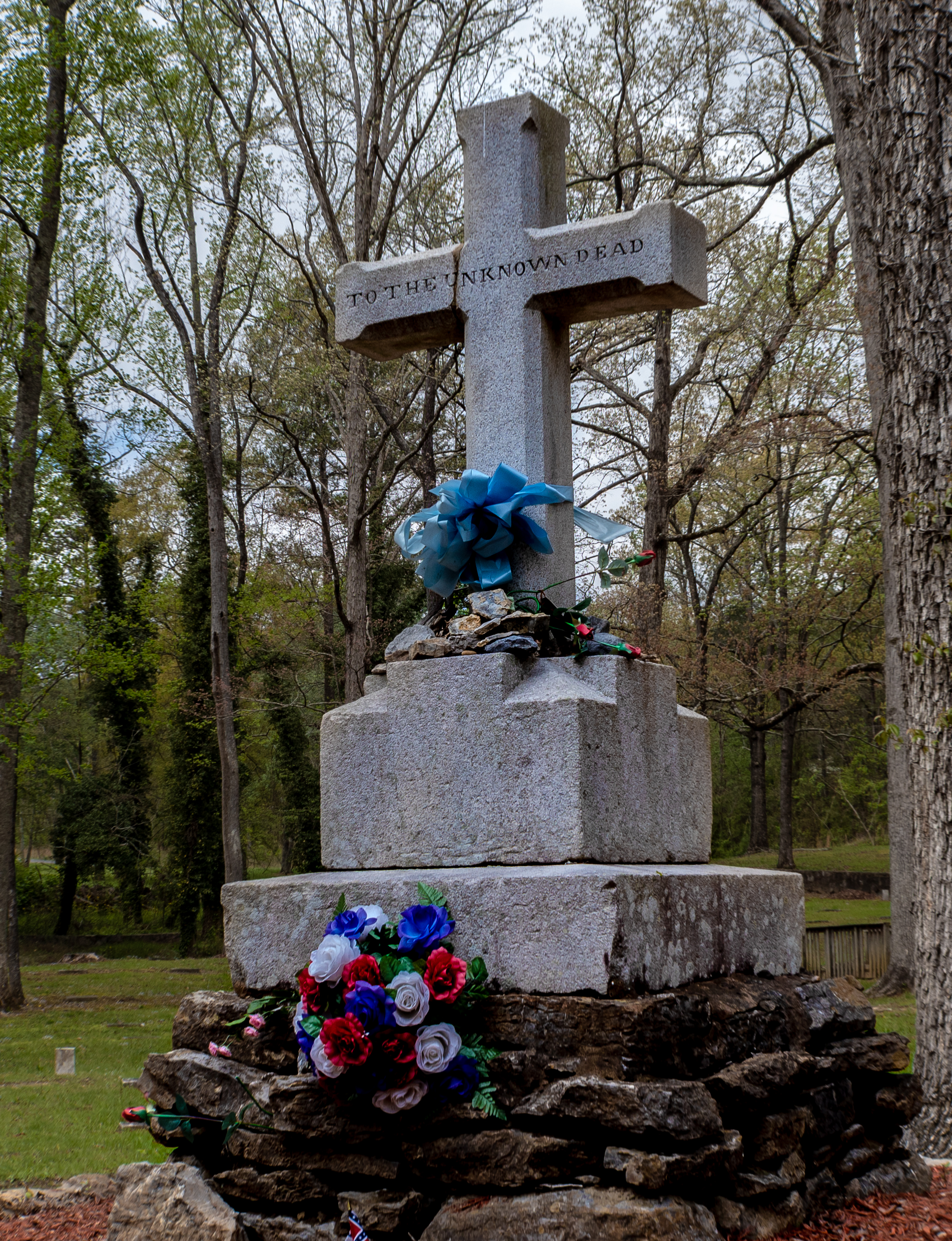
largest grave in the confederate cemetery in Resaca, ga
