= 81st Ohio Infantry Regiment =

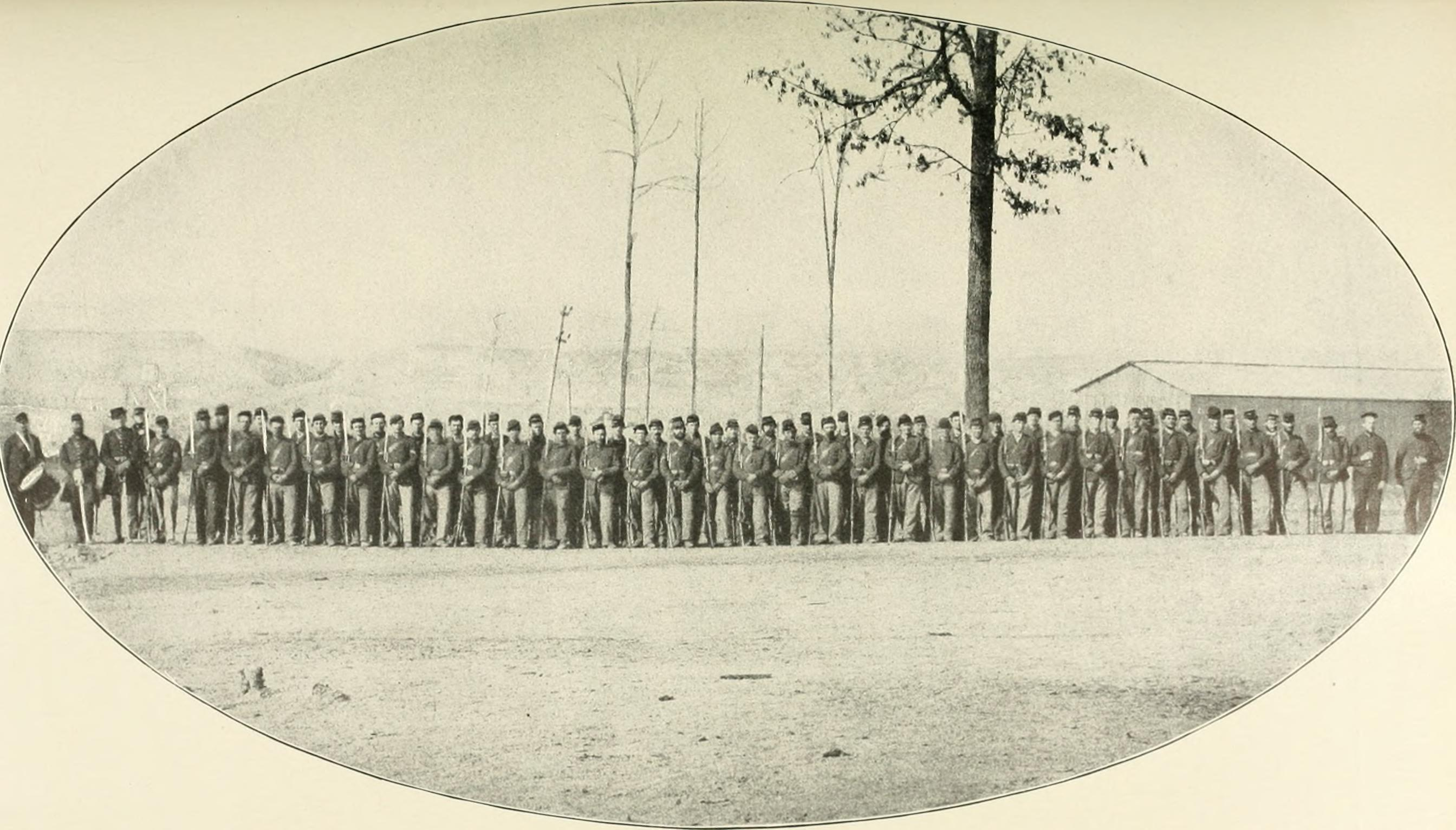
- The 81st Ohio at Corinth, December 1862.
- Active: September 1861 to July 13, 1865
- Country: United States
- Allegiance: Union
- Branch: Infantry
- Engagements: Battle of Shiloh; Siege of Corinth; Battle of Iuka; Second Battle of Corinth; Atlanta campaign; Battle of Resaca; Battle of Lay's Ferry; Battle of Rome Cross Roads; Battle of Dallas; Battle of New Hope Church; Battle of Allatoona; Battle of Kennesaw Mountain; Battle of Atlanta; Siege of Atlanta; Battle of Jonesboro; Battle of Lovejoy's Station; Sherman's March to the Sea; Carolinas campaign; Battle of Bentonville

The 81st Ohio Infantry Regiment, sometimes 81st Ohio Volunteer Infantry (or 81st OVI) was an infantry regiment in the Union Army during the American Civil War.

== Service ==
The 81st Ohio Infantry was originally organized as "Morton's Independent Rifle Regiment" and mustered in for three years service under the command of Colonel Thomas Morton.

The regiment was attached to Department of Missouri, to March 1862. 2nd Brigade, 2nd Division, Army of the Tennessee, to July 1862. 2nd Brigade, 2nd Division, District of Corinth, Mississippi, to September 1862. 1st Brigade, 2nd Division, District of Corinth, Mississippi, to November 1862. 2nd Brigade, District of Corinth, Mississippi, XIII Corps, Department of the Tennessee, to December 1862. 2nd Brigade, District of Corinth, XVII Corps, to January 1863. 2nd Brigade, District of Corinth, XVI Corps, to March 1863. 2nd Brigade, 2nd Division, XVI Corps, to September 1864. 2nd Brigade, 4th Division, XV Corps, to July 1865.

The 81st Ohio Infantry mustered out of service at Louisville, Kentucky, on July 13, 1865.

== Detailed service ==
Duty at Benton Barracks, Mo., until September 24, 1861. Moved to Franklin, Mo., September 24, then to Harman, Mo., September 27, and duty there until December 20. Expedition to Fulton, Calloway County, Mo., November 1861. Expedition after guerrillas in northern Missouri December 20, 1861, to January 4, 1862. Duty along Northern Missouri Railroad at Wellsville, Montgomery City, and Danville (headquarters at Danville) until March 1, 1862. Moved to St. Louis, Mo., then to Pittsburg Landing, Tenn., March 1–15, 1862. Battle of Shiloh, April 6–7. Advance on and siege of Corinth, Miss., April 29-May 30. Pursuit to Booneville June 1–14. Duty at Corinth until August. Guard stores at Hamburg until September 17. Movements on Iuka, Miss., September 17–20. Battle of Corinth October 3–4. Pursuit to Ripley October 5–12. Five companies joined the regiment October 19. Duty at Corinth until April 1863. Raid to Tupelo, Miss., December 13–19, 1862 and January 3–19, 1863. Raid to intercept Forrest January 2–3. Cornersville Pike January 28 (detachment). Dodge's Expedition to northern Alabama April 15-May 8. Great Bear Creek April 17. Rock Cut, near Tuscumbia, April 22. Tuscumbia April 23. Town Creek April 28. Moved to Pocahontas June 3, and duty there until October 29. March to Pulaski October 29-November 10. Duty at Pulaski, Wales, Sam's Mills, and Nancy's Mills (headquarters at Pulaski) until March 1864. Moved to Lynnville March 5, and to Pulaski April 19. March to Chattanooga, Tenn., April 29-May 4. Atlanta Campaign May to September. Demonstrations on Resaca May 8–12. Snake Creek Gap and Sugar Valley, near Resaca, May 9. Near Resaca May 13. Battle of Resaca May 14. Lay's Ferry, Oostenaula River, May 14–15. Rome Cross Roads May 16. Advance on Dallas May 18–25. Operations on line of Pumpkin Vine Creek and battles about Dallas, New Hope Church, and Allatoona Hills May 25-June 5. Operations about Marietta and against Kennesaw Mountain June 10-July 2. Assault on Kennesaw June 27. Nickajack Creek July 2–5. Ruff's Mills July 3–4. Chattahoochie River July 6–17. Battle of Atlanta July 22. Siege of Atlanta July 22-August 25. Ezra Chapel July 28. Flank movement on Jonesboro August 25–30. Battle of Jonesboro August 31-September 1. Lovejoy's Station September 2–6. Non-veterans mustered out September 26, 1864. Garrison duty at Rome until November. Reconnaissance from Rome on Cave Springs Road and skirmishes October 12–13. March to the sea November 15-December 10. Ogeechee Canal December 8. Siege of Savannah December 10–21. Campaign of the Carolinas January to April, 1865. Salkehatchie Swamps, S.C., February 2–5. South Edisto River February 9. North Edisto River February 12–13. Columbia February 16–17. Lynch's Creek February 26. Battle of Bentonville, N.C., March 19–21. Occupation of Goldsboro March 24. Advance on Raleigh April 10–14. Occupation of Raleigh April 14. Bennett's House April 26. Surrender of Johnston and his army. March to Washington, D.C., via Richmond, Va., April 29-May 20. Grand Review of the Armies May 24. Moved to Louisville, Ky., June.

== Casualties ==
The regiment lost a total of 222 men during service; 4 officers and 58 enlisted men killed or mortally wounded, 160 enlisted men died of disease.

== Commanders ==
- Colonel Thomas Morton
- Colonel Robert N. Adams

== Notable members ==
- Major Charles Nelson Lamison - U.S. Representative from Ohio, 1871–1875

== See also ==
- List of Ohio Civil War units
- Ohio in the Civil War
