= Edward Connor (cricketer) =

English cricketer (1872–1947)

Edward James Connor (9 November 1872 – 11 January 1947) was an English cricketer active in 1905 who played for Essex. He was born in Folkestone and died in Enfield, Middlesex. He appeared in two first-class matches as a righthanded batsman who bowled right arm medium pace. He scored 43 runs with a highest score of 26 and took two wickets with a best performance of two for 21.
