= Tom Markham =

Irish patron of Gaelic games (b. 1878, d. 1939)

Thomas Joseph Markham (14 December 1878 – 15 June 1939) founded two Gaelic Athletic Association clubs in Dublin. After his death, funds were collected to provide the Tom Markham Memorial Cup, which was awarded annually to the county which won the All-Ireland Minor Football Championship from 1940 to 2013.

== Life ==
Thomas Markham was born in Cragbrien, Lisheen, Clondagad, County Clare, on 14 December 1878, to John and Bridget (Slattery) Markham.

He was a civil servant residing in Dublin when he married Agnes Daly in Ballycorick Church on 17 July 1907.

By 1911, he was an Assistant Clerk in the Local Government Board, and was using the Irish-language version of his name, Tomás Ua Marcacáin.

He joined the Irish Volunteers in 1912. He was wounded during the Easter Rising. He later was an intelligence officer for Michael Collins after being released from prison by the British Army.

== Death ==
Markham died at his residence, 25 Windsor Avenue, in Fairview, on 15 June 1939.

== Legacy ==
After Markham's death, a committee was established which raised the funds to provide the Tom Markham Memorial Cup in his memory.

The original cup was replaced in 2014.
