= Resaca, Georgia =

- Town
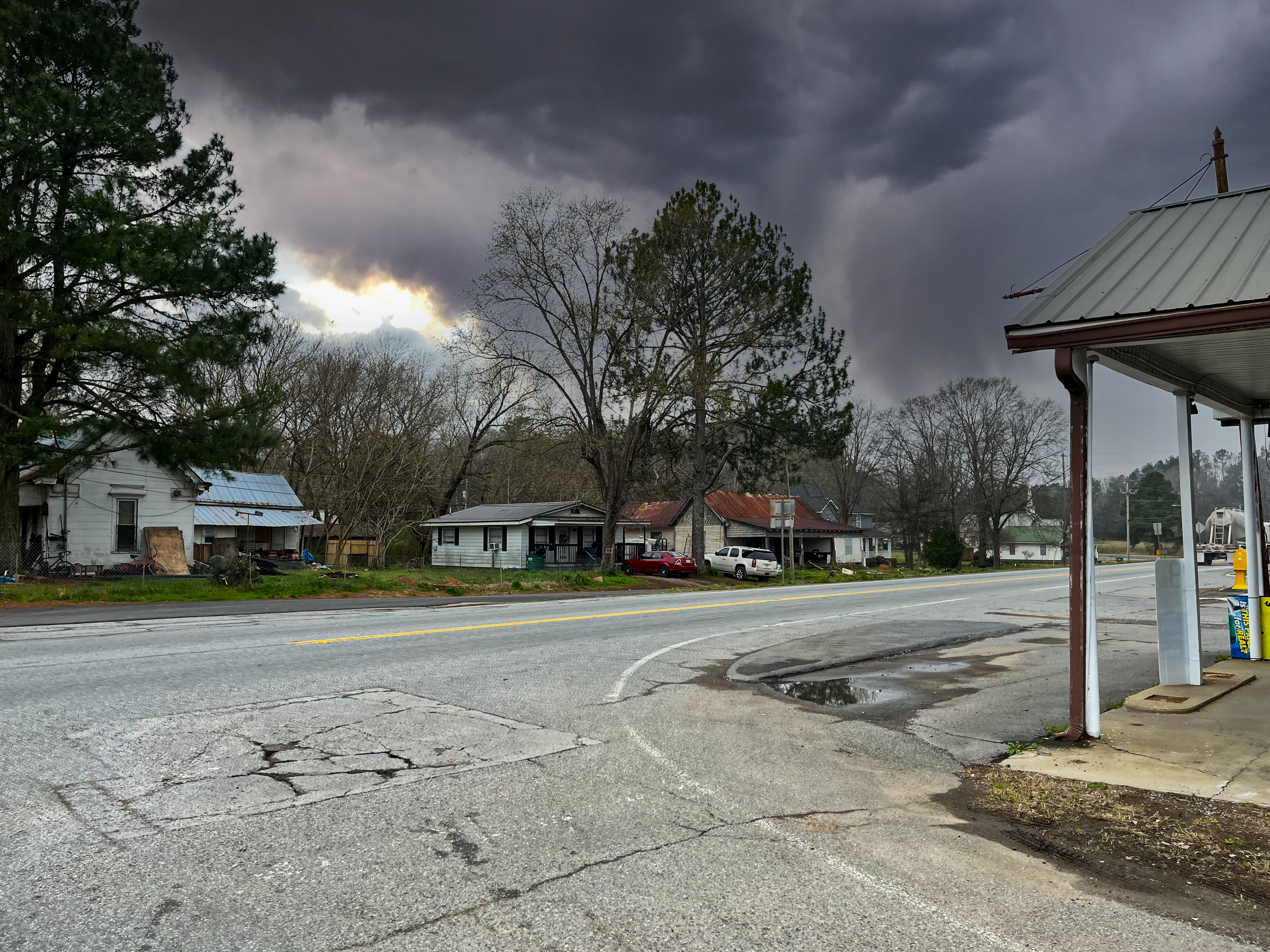
- Resaca in 2022

- Location in Gordon County and the state of Georgia
- Coordinates: 34°34′45″N 84°56′38″W
- Country: United States
- State: Georgia
- County: Gordon
- Incorporated (town): January 1, 1981

Government
  - Mayor: Travis D. Rogers

Area
  - Total: 2.83 sq mi (7.33 km^{2})
  - Land: 2.77 sq mi (7.18 km^{2})
  - Water: 0.058 sq mi (0.15 km^{2})
- Elevation: 643 ft (196 m)

Population (2020)
  - Total: 1,142
  - Density: 411.9/sq mi (159.05/km^{2})
- Time zone: UTC-5 (Eastern (EST))
  - Summer (DST): UTC-4 (EDT)
- ZIP code: 30735, 30701
- Area codes: 706/762
- FIPS code: 13-64736
- GNIS feature ID: 0356494
- Website: https://www.resacaga.org/

Resaca is a town in Gordon County, Georgia, United States, with unincorporated areas extending into Whitfield County. Resaca lies along the Oostanaula River. The town population is 1,142 as of the 2020 Census. It is home to the Resaca Confederate Cemetery (Battle of Resaca) and the only Orthodox Christian monastery in Georgia.

== Geography ==
Resaca is located at 34°34′45″N 84°56′38″W (34.579116, −84.943989).

According to the United States Census Bureau, the town has a total area of 2.9 square miles (7.5 km^{2}), of which 0.1 sq mi (0.26 km^{2}) (2.47%) is covered by water.

== History ==
Resaca, originally known as Dublin when it was founded in 1848 with the arrival of the Western and Atlantic Railroad into the area, was renamed Resacca when it was incorporated as a town in 1854. In 1871, the spelling of the town was shortened to its present form.

The town was named by returning Mexican–American War inductees who fought at the Battle of Resaca de la Palma (translated Dry River Bed of the Palms) in Brownsville, Texas, in 1846.

=== Civil War era ===
The Civil War Battle of Resaca was fought in and around Resaca in May 1864. Each year, a re-enactment of the battle, the largest of the Atlanta campaign, is held on the third weekend of May.

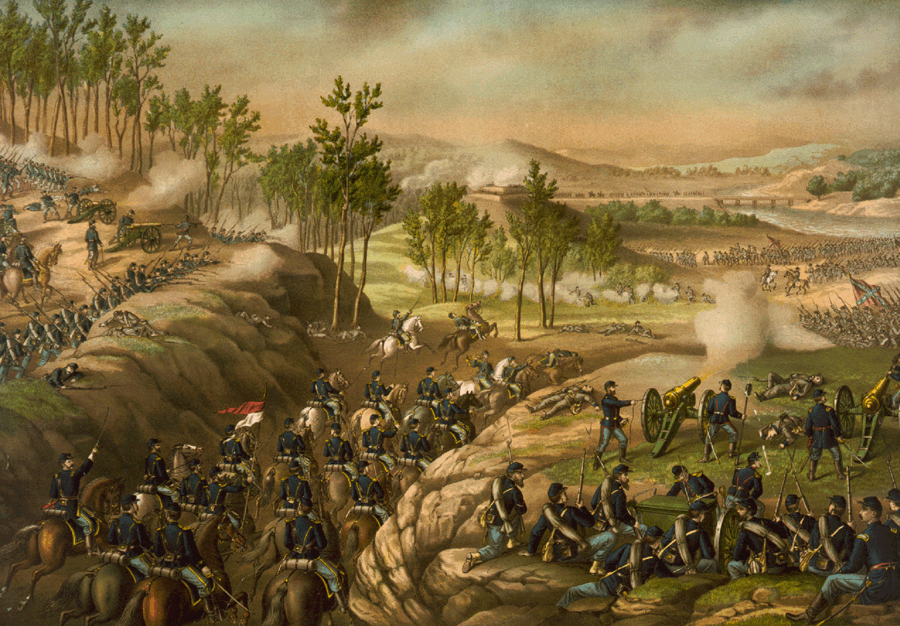
Painting depicting the Battle of Resaca

Resaca is also the location of the first Confederate cemetery in Georgia. The story of the cemetery is:

The memory of a Georgia woman, Mary J. Green, who with her own hands gathered and interred the bones and bodies of the Confederate dead left lying on the Resaca Battlefield, should always be sacred to us. The sight that greeted the Green family when they returned to their plantation after the battle was almost more than they could bear. Around the house on all sides were scattered graves of Confederates who had been buried where they fell. The Green daughters conceived the idea of collecting all the bodies and re-interring them in a plot of land to be known as a Confederate cemetery. The one great drawback, however, was that they had no money. In the summer of 1866, Mary began writing to her friends around the state, begging them to try and raise money for the cemetery. Although poverty was rampant in the South, the citizenry responded by giving what they could, be it a nickel, a dime, a quarter, or a dollar. Col. Green gave his daughters 2.5 acres [1.0 ha] of land with rustic bridges spanning the stream through the grounds of their cemetery.

The account of the first Memorial Day, October 25, 1866, written by Mary Green: "The day selected for the dedication ... was bright and beautiful, one of those charming days of our Indian summers where no sound was heard save the fluttering of falling leaves – a suitable accompaniment to our sad thoughts, as we stood in the 'bivouac of the dead.'" This cemetery and one at Winchester, Virginia, were consecrated and dedicated on the same day, each sponsoring group thinking theirs was the first Confederate Cemetery.

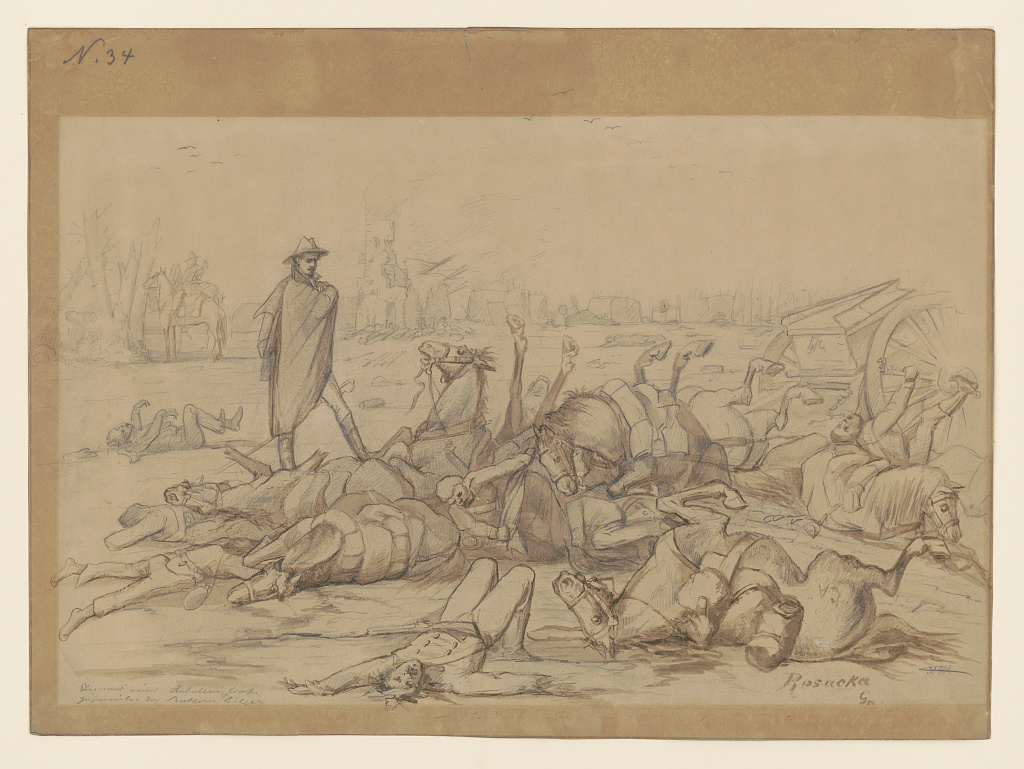
Adolph Metzner's depiction of a view inside a confederate fortification at Resaca

Mathew Brady captured several photographs of the battlefield. Scenes of the conflict and its aftermath were also depicted by various artists including Adolph Metzner.

=== 20th century ===
The Town of Resaca was incorporated and granted a charter by the State of Georgia in 1981.

== Nomenclature ==
Resacas are former channels of the Rio Grande. Two explanations are given for the origin of the word "resaca". The less likely holds that it is a contraction of Spanish rio seco ("dry river"). The other is that the word stems from the Spanish resacar ("to retake"), since the primary geological function of a resaca seems to be diversion and dissipation of floodwater from the river. Resacas are naturally cut off from the river, having no inlet or outlet. Vernacular northern Mexican and other Latin American Spanish dialects translate resaca as "hangover" - undoubtedly referencing the dry cotton-mouth condition the morning after heavy alcohol consumption - as a dry river bed.

Anecdotes abound as to the derivation of the place name, one involving the capture of an Indian maiden by settlers to be offered in marriage to the single man of her choosing. Transported by her captors to the center of the settlement in a gunnysack, she was ceremoniously unveiled to the awaiting public. Upon seeing her in the sunlight, onlookers were aghast at her homeliness, whereupon chants of "Re-sack-'er" arose.

== Monastery ==
Since 1977, the Resaca area has been the home of the Monastery of the Glorious Ascension, housed in the former mid-century modern hilltop residence purchased from the late Thurman Chitwood, local entrepreneur and ordained minister in the Church of Christ. The monastery is the only Orthodox Christian monastery in the state. At one time, it offered hospice to those afflicted with AIDS. Local detractors, with unfounded fears of casual communicability of AIDS, unsuccessfully sought to have its permitting revoked.

The monastery, just across the line in Whitfield County, maintains a cemetery for Orthodox Christians. It has been under the authority of various "national" jurisdictions, which is not uncommon for an Orthodox monastery. It is currently part of the Russian Orthodox Church Outside of Russia. The Abbot is Archimandrite Maximos Weimar.

== Pageant ==
The Resaca Beach Poster Girl Contest, a swimsuit pageant at one time known throughout the South, was founded in the nearby city of Dalton in 1983 as a marketing gimmick of Conquest Carpet Mills, Inc. The name is tongue-in-cheek, since no ocean is located for hundreds of miles, although it draws reference to a once-popular bathing spot on the Oostanaula River bank commonly deemed Resaca Beach. Local boosterism proclaims: "Resaca Beach – North Georgia's Gateway to the Gulf". The pageant, which launched the career of Whitfield County native Marla Maples, former spouse of real estate magnate and President Donald Trump, had been held intermittently since the mid-1980s, most recently in 2008.

== Demographics ==
Historical population
| Census | Pop. | Note | %± |
|---|---|---|---|
| 1880 | 191 | | — |
| 1890 | 197 | | 3.1% |
| 1900 | 128 | | −35.0% |
| 1910 | 112 | | −12.5% |
| 1990 | 410 | | — |
| 2000 | 815 | | 98.8% |
| 2010 | 544 | | −33.3% |
| 2020 | 1,142 | | 109.9% |
U.S. Decennial Census

=== 2020 census ===
As of the 2020 census, Resaca had a population of 1,142. The median age was 33.8 years. 23.7% of residents were under the age of 18 and 10.2% of residents were 65 years of age or older. For every 100 females there were 117.9 males, and for every 100 females age 18 and over there were 123.9 males age 18 and over.

67.5% of residents lived in urban areas, while 32.5% lived in rural areas.

There were 288 households in Resaca, of which 45.8% had children under the age of 18 living in them. Of all households, 53.1% were married-couple households, 11.8% were households with a male householder and no spouse or partner present, and 23.6% were households with a female householder and no spouse or partner present. About 17.7% of all households were made up of individuals and 6.6% had someone living alone who was 65 years of age or older.

There were 314 housing units, of which 8.3% were vacant. The homeowner vacancy rate was 0.0% and the rental vacancy rate was 12.2%.

Racial composition as of the 2020 census
| Race | Number | Percent |
|---|---|---|
| White | 693 | 60.7% |
| Black or African American | 71 | 6.2% |
| American Indian and Alaska Native | 15 | 1.3% |
| Asian | 11 | 1.0% |
| Native Hawaiian and Other Pacific Islander | 2 | 0.2% |
| Some other race | 206 | 18.0% |
| Two or more races | 144 | 12.6% |
| Hispanic or Latino (of any race) | 432 | 37.8% |

=== 2000 census ===
As of the 2000 census, 815 people, 263 households, and 189 families were residing in the city. The population density was 295.4 inhabitants per square mile (114.1/km^{2}). The 280 housing units had an average density of 101.5 units per square mile (39.2 units/km^{2}). The racial makeup of the city was 78.90% White, 2.70% African American, 0.25% Native American, 0.86% Asian, 15.58% from other races, and 1.72% from two or more races. Hispanics or Latinos of any race were 18.77% of the population.

Of the 263 households, 37.3% had children under 18 living with them, 43.7% were married couples living together, 20.2% had a female householder with no husband present, and 28.1% were not families. About 23.2% of all households were made up of individuals, and 8.7% had someone living alone who was 65 or older. The average household size was 2.73 and the average family size was 3.14.

In the city, the age distribution was 26.3% under 18, 10.4% from 18 to 24, 27.9% from 25 to 44, 18.2% from 45 to 64, and 17.3% who were 65 or older. The median age was 34 years. For every 100 females, there were 89.5 males. For every 100 females age 18 and over, there were 86.6 males.

The median income for a household in the city was $30,170, and for a family was $30,938. Males had a median income of $22,321 versus $20,132 for females. The per capita income for the city was $13,052. About 8.6% of families and 11.3% of the population were below the poverty line, including 15.4% of those under 18 and 6.5% of those 65 or over.

== Education ==
- Tolbert Elementary School

== See also ==
- Resaca Confederate Cemetery
