= Gus Cremin =

Irish Gaelic footballer

Gus Cremin (26 January 1921 – 13 November 2014) was an Irish Gaelic footballer who played for Kerry GAA.

== Personal life ==
Cremin was born in Lisselton in north Kerry where he lived with wife Celia and their extended family. He died on 13 November 2014.

== Career highlights ==
With his team mate and fellow midfielder, the great Eddie Dowling, Gus helped the Shannon Rangers win the 1945 Kerry County Championship, thus putting him in line for the Kerry captaincy the following year. He was chosen for the Kerry Juniors in 1946 and then went straight onto the senior side for the All-Ireland semi-final against Antrim.

In the final against Roscommon he captained Kerry and became the youngest ever to lead the side in an All-Ireland final. It was a dramatic match and late goals from Paddy Burke and "Gega" O'Connor helped snatch a draw for the Kingdom. Gus was shouldered high from the field by supporters after an amazing game. However, Kerry caused a sensation by relegating their captain to the subs; Gus was dramatically dropped for the replay.

With fifteen minutes left in the replay Kerry were trailing Roscommon by two points, who showed no sign of losing their lead. Entering that last quarter Kerry made the move that won the match by finally allowing the former captain to come on the field as a sub. He immediately set up Paddy Burke who found the net and the Kingdom were ahead. With a few minutes to go in the match Gus scored a magnificent point from 50 yards. This was the decider and Kerry went on to win. Later it was described as "one of the most perfect and valuable points ever scored in Croke Park."

The following year Gus was most unfortunate when a broken leg sustained in a North Kerry League game prevented him from traveling to America for the historic 1947 Polo Grounds Final in New York. He played his last game for Kerry in the 1948 All-Ireland semi-final loss to Mayo.
