= Bill Jackson (basketball) =

Irish basketball player

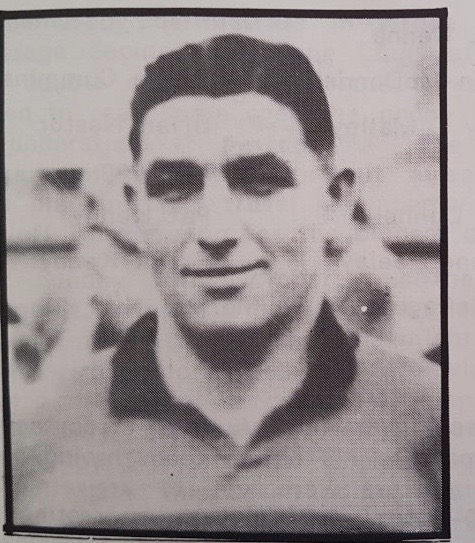

Personal information
- Nationality: Irish
- Born: 8 August 1918; Roscommon, Ireland
- Died: 26 November 1985 (aged 67); Athlone, Ireland

Sport
- Sport: Basketball

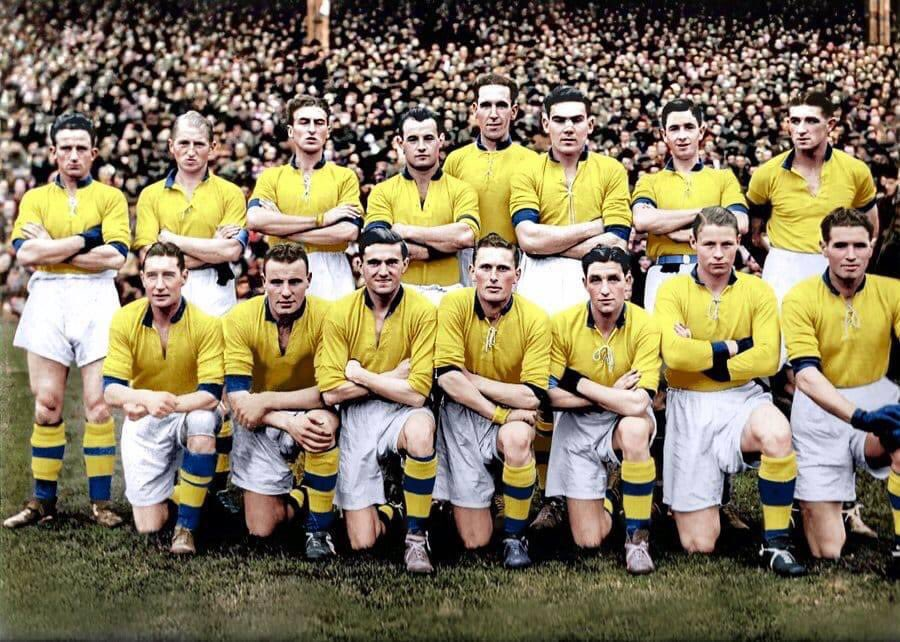
Roscommon, 1943 All-Ireland SFC winning team, in colour

William Jackson (8 August 1918 – 26 November 1985) was an Irish basketball and GAA player. Jackson was a member of the 1943 & 1944 Roscommon All-Ireland winning teams. In 1943 they defeated Cavan with Bill "Stonewall" Jackson at left full back in a replay by a score of 2-7 - 2-2. Jackson was regarded as one of the soundest corner backs of the era. The following year the Connacht side beat Kerry 1-9 to 2-4 with Jackson lining out at right full back. Kerry were to enact revenge in the 1946 All-Ireland final in a replay.

The Castlrea native who played his club football for Tarmon & St. Brigid's, was a member of the Railway Cup winning teams of 1944, 1945 & 1946 as well as having 6 Connacht medals to his name. Jackson also refereed several inter-county clashes including the 1954 All-Ireland minor final between Kerry & Dublin.

In March 2000, the Jackson was named at left corner back in the Roscommon GAA Team of the Millennium.

== Irish Olympian ==
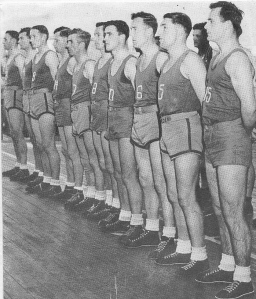

The Sgt. Major also competed for Ireland for Basketball in the men's tournament at the 1948 Summer Olympics. Historian Dr Tom Hunt describes the Irish contingent in his ‘Nuggets of Pure Olympic Gold’ column:

“Ireland had a team in the 1948 Games which were held in London. This side are one of the hidden pieces of Irish Olympic history. They played five matches and lost all five. It was an all Army team with the exception of Harry Boland, whose uncle of the same name operated alongside Michael Collins in the War of Independence.

“The most high profile player on the team was Bill Jackson, a legendary Roscommon footballer who won All-Ireland SFC titles in 1943 and 1944.”

6 Members of the dominant Western Command from Athlone, including Jackson, were on the team. Jackson, who married Maureen McNamara, was joined on the team by brothers Dermot and Paddy Sheriff, who also married McNamara sisters.

From 1941 to 1951, the Western Command won ten of the eleven army championships, losing just once. And in 1947 alone, the Custume Club created a record, winning the All Army championship, the Westmeath championship, the inter-county championship, the All-Ireland championship, the All-Ireland inter provincial championship, and the All Ireland and international blitz championships. And it was that wonderful record which helped secure the strong Athlone representation at the 1948 Olympics.

Ireland competed in a group with Mexico, France, Cuba & Iran and to this day are the only Irish Basketball team to compete at the Olympic Games.

== 6th Infantry Battalion ==
Jackson continued to play on the Western Command basketball team following the Olympics alongside what was termed “The Family”, which included Dermot Sheriff and Paddy Sheriff as well as non-Olympians Ned Sheehan and Turlough O’Connor who were all brothers-in-law of one another. Jackson also served two foreign expeditions with the Army in the Congo and Cyprus. Jackson retired at the rank of Sergeant Major in 1978 after over 40 years of service and lived the rest of his life in Athlone.
