= Bill Carlos =

Irish Gaelic footballer

William J. Carlos (1923 – 11 March 1997) was an Irish Gaelic footballer who played as a centre-back for the Roscommon senior team.

Born in Castlerea, County Roscommon, Carlos was introduced to Gaelic football during his schooling at Roscommon CBS. At club level he enjoyed a distinguished career with Ballintober.

Carlos made his debut on the inter-county scene when he first linked up with the Roscommon minor team. An All-Ireland medallist in this grade, Carlos later made his senior football debut. He went on to play a key role for Roscommon during a hugely successful era, and won two All-Ireland medals and four Connacht medals. He was an All-Ireland runner-up on one occasion.

As a member of the Connacht inter-provincial team on a number of occasions, Carlos never won a Railway Cup medal.

Regarded as one of Roscommon's greatest players of all time, Carlos was named at centre-back on the Roscommon Football Team of the Millennium.
