= Brendan Lynch (Roscommon Gaelic footballer) =

Irish Gaelic footballer

Brendan Lynch (14 February 1923 – 30 March 2014) was an Irish Gaelic footballer who played as a right wing-back for the Roscommon senior team.

Born in Oran, County Roscommon, Lynch was introduced to Gaelic football during his schooling at Roscommon CBS. At club level he enjoyed a distinguished career with Oran.

Lynch made his debut on the inter-county scene when he first linked up with the Roscommon minor team. An All-Ireland medallist in this grade, Lynch later made his senior football debut. He went on to play a key role for Roscommon during a hugely successful era, and won two All-Ireland medals and six Connacht medals. He was an All-Ireland runner-up on one occasion.

As a member of the Connacht inter-provincial team on a number of occasions, Lynch never won a Railway Cup medal.

Regarded as one of Roscommon's greatest players of all time, Lynch was named at right wing-back on the Roscommon Football Team of the Millennium.
