= 1946 All-Ireland Senior Football Championship =

Football championship

All-Ireland Champions
- Winning team: Kerry (16th win)
- Captain: Paddy Kennedy

All-Ireland Finalists
- Losing team: Roscommon
- Captain: Jimmy Murray

Provincial Champions
- Munster: Kerry
- Leinster: Laois
- Ulster: Antrim
- Connacht: Roscommon

Championship statistics

The 1946 All-Ireland Senior Football Championship was the 60th staging of Ireland's premier Gaelic football knock-out competition.

The Munster Quarter-Final Kerry ended Cork's All Ireland title.

Kerry won their sixteenth title, moving ahead of Dublin in the all-time standings, a position which they have never lost since.

== Results ==
=== Connacht Senior Football Championship ===
26 May 1946
Quarter-Final

Sligo	6–10 – 0–6	Leitrim

Carrick-on-Shannon

16 June 1946
Semi-Final

Roscommon	0–7 – 0–4	Galway

St. Coman's Park, Roscommon

23 June 1946
Semi-Final

Mayo	2–9 – 2–6	Sligo
P Carney (0–4), Joe Gilvarry (1–0), S Mellette (0–1), J Kilroy (1–0) & J Mulvey (0–2).

James Stephens Park, Ballina

21 July 1946
Final

Roscommon	1–4 – 0–6	Mayo
		P Carney (0–2, frees), E Mongey (0–1), P Quinn (0–1) & J Munnelly (0–2).

Dunlo GAA Grounds, Ballinasloe
Referee: P. McKenna (Limerick)

Note: Roscommon's goal proved to be a controversial one. The goal was scored by Roscommon's Jimmy Murray and there was some confusion as to whether or not it would be allowed as the umpires failed to signal the score. It was only after Jimmy Murray had raised the green flag himself that the umpires finally signalled the goal. The referee, speaking after the match to the Irish Press match reporter ‘Green Flag’ (an appropriate sobriquet) stated that he had allowed the score because in his opinion the Mayo goalkeeper, Tom Byrne, was behind the line when he saved Murray's initial goal effort. In the week following the final, Mayo entered a formal objection with the Connacht Council, reportedly about the legality of two of the Roscommon team. Roscommon entered a counter-objection. At a meeting of the Connacht Council on 5/8/1946 at Castlerea, both the objection and counter-objection were withdrawn, the referee's report was adopted and a replay ordered. (Source: Irish Press reports July, August 1946).

11 August 1946
Final Replay

Roscommon	1–9 – 1–2	Mayo
		P Carney (0–1, free), Joe Gilvarry (1–0) & T Acton (0–1).

St. Coman's Park, Roscommon
Referee: H. Vallelly or Alf Murray (Armagh)

=== Leinster Senior Football Championship ===
12 May 1946
Preliminary Round

Meath	2–11 – 0–8	Longford

Cusack Park, Mullingar

19 May 1946
Preliminary Round

Louth	2–7 – 0–7	Wicklow

Croke Park, Dublin

19 May 1946
Preliminary Round

Laois	1–3 – 0–5	Dublin
Seamus Hughes 1–1, Chris Delaney (0-1f) and Paddy Peacock 0–1 each		M Killeen 0–2, Matt Fletcher (0-1f), M O'Reilly, N Ryan 0–1 each

Geraldine Park, Athy

19 May 1946
Preliminary Round

Offaly	2–6 – 0–4	Westmeath

Cusack Park, Mullingar
Referee: P Russell

5 May 1946
Quarter-Final

Kildare	2–3 – 2–3	Carlow
P.White, R.Martin 1–0, M.Byrne 0–2, P.O'Brien 0–1.

Geraldine Park, Athy

12 May 1946
Quarter-Final Replay

Kildare	3–5 – 0–7	Carlow
R.Martin 2–1, M.Byrne 1–3, P.White 0–1

Dr. Cullen Park, Carlow

2 June 1946
Quarter-Final

Laois	1–7 – 1–5	Offaly

O'Connor Park, Tullamore
Attendance: 9,000
Referee: Kennedy

9 June 1946
Quarter-Final

Louth	1–6 – 0–6	Meath

Drogheda Park, Drogheda

16 June 1946
Semi-Final

Kildare	3–3 – 0–10	Wexford
M.Byrne 0–3, W.Geraghty, T.Fox, R.Martin 1–0.

Dr. Cullen Park, Carlow

30 June 1946
Semi-Final

Laois	1–9 – 0–10	Louth

Croke Park, Dublin

14 July 1946
Final

Laois	0–11 – 1–6	Kildare
Tommy Murphy 0-8f, Seamus Hughes, Bill Delaney, Morgan Delaney 0–1 each		T. Ryan 1–1, Michael Byrne 0–2 (0-1f), Pat White, John Donnelly, Paddy O'Brien 0–1 each

Croke Park, Dublin
Attendance: 27,353
Referee: Patsy Ratty (Meath)

=== Munster Senior Football Championship ===
26 May 1946
Quarter-Final

Clare	3–6 – 4–3	Limerick

Hennessy Memorial Park, Miltown Malbay

2 June 1946
Quarter-Final Replay

Clare	2–12 – 1–0	Limerick

Gaelic Grounds, Limerick

2 June 1946
Quarter-Final

Kerry	1–8 – 1–4	Cork
Jackie Falvey (0–1), Charlie O'Connor (0–3), Batt Garvey (0–1), Jackie Lyne (0–1) & Paddy Burke (0–2).		D. Murray (0–1), J. Lynch (0–1) & J. Cronin (1–0).

Fitzgerald Stadium, Killarney

9 June 1946
Semi-Final

Waterford	2–4 – 1–5	Tipperary

Fraher Field, Dungarvan
Referee: D. O'Leary ( C )

7 July 1946
Semi-Final

Kerry	1–6 – 0–7	Clare
Jackie Falvey (0–1), Willie O'Donnell (0–1), Jackie Lyne (0–1) & Paddy Burke (1–3).

Cusack Park, Ennis

21 July 1946
Final

Kerry	2–16 – 2–1	Waterford
T. O'Connor (0–1), J. Falvey (1–1), Dan Kavanagh (0–1), Tom Gega O'Connor (0–7), J. Lyne (1–2), P. Burke (0–2) & P. Kennedy (0–1).

Austin Stack Park, Tralee

=== Ulster Senior Football Championship ===
9 June 1946
Preliminary Round

Derry	4–6 – 0–4	Fermanagh

Rossa Park, Magherafelt

23 June 1946
Quarter-Final

Cavan	8–13 – 2–3	Tyrone
T O Reilly (2–6), J Cassidy (1–1), M Higgins (2–5), J Stafford (3–0), P Donohoe (0–1)		I Jones (1–1), M Harte (2–1)

Omagh

23 June 1946
Quarter-Final

Donegal	4–5 – 1–9	Monaghan

St. Tiernach's Park, Clones

23 June 1946
Quarter-Final

Armagh	0–13 – 0–4	Down

St. Patrick's Park, Newcastle

30 June 1946
Quarter-Final

Antrim	1–11 – 0–10	Derry

Corrigan Park, Belfast

7 July 1946
Semi-Final

Cavan	5–8 – 0–3	Donegal
T O Reilly (3–1), J Stafford (0–3), P Donohoe (0–3), M Higgins (0–1), Boylan (1–0), Deneher (1–0)		F White (0–2), M Slevin (0–1)

Omagh

14 July 1946
Semi-Final

Antrim	1–12 – 0–6	Armagh

Omagh

21 July 1946
Final

Antrim	2–8 – 1–7	Cavan
J Mc Callin (2–0), K Armstrong (0–2), F Mc Corry (0–4), Pa O Hara (0–1), H O Neill (0–1)		T O Reilly (1–2), M Higgins (0–2), P Donohoe (0–2), P Cassidy (0–1)

St. Tiernach's Park, Clones
Attendance: 15,000

=== All-Ireland Senior Football Championship ===
18 August 1946
Semi-Final

Kerry	2–7 – 0–10	Antrim
Willie O'Donnell (1–5), Paddy Kennedy (0–1), Batt Garvey (1–0) & Dan Kavanagh (0–1).

Croke Park, Dublin
Attendance: 30,051

25 August 1946
Semi-Final

Roscommon	3–5 – 2–6	Laois

Croke Park, Dublin
Attendance: 51,275

6 October 1946
Final

Kerry	2–4 – 1–7	Roscommon
Batt Garvey (0–1), Paddy Burke (1–1) & Tom Gega O'Connor (1–2).		D. Keenan (0–4), J.J. Fallon 1–1 & F. Kinlough (0–2).

Croke Park, Dublin
Attendance: 75,771
Referee: Bill Delaney (Laois)

27 October 1946
Final Replay

Kerry	2–8 – 0–10	Roscommon
Paddy Kennedy (0–1), Tom Gega O'Connor (1–4), Batt Garvey (0–2), Paddy Burke (1–0) & Sub Gus Cremin (0–1) for Jackie Falvey.		D. Keenan (0–7), J.J. Fallon (0–2) & J. McQullian (0–1).

Croke Park, Dublin
Attendance: 65,661
Referee: Paddy Mythen (Wexford)

== Championship statistics ==
=== Miscellaneous ===
- Antrim won the Ulster title for the first time since 1913.
- A Roscommon goal proved to be a controversial one which caused the Connacht final to go a replay.
- The All-Ireland final was originally scheduled for 22 September 1946, but was delayed for two weeks as part of the "Save the Harvest" campaign.
- The All-Ireland final ends in a draw and goes to a replay for the first time since 1943 as Kerry win their 16th title there are now the county that has now won the most All Ireland finals.
- Kerry goalkeeper Dan O'Keeffe becomes the first Gaelic Football player to win a 7th All-Ireland winners medal on the field of play, a record which stood until 1986.
