= Roscommon GAA =

County board of the Gaelic Athletic Association in Ireland

- Irish: CLG Ros Comáin
- Nickname(s): The Rossies
- Province: Connacht
- Dominant sport: Gaelic football
- Ground(s): Dr Hyde Park, Roscommon
- County colours: Primrose Royal blue (Black and green until 1935)

County teams
- NFL: Division 1
- NHL: Division 3
- Football Championship: Sam Maguire Cup
- Hurling Championship: Christy Ring Cup
- Ladies' Gaelic football: Brendan Martin Cup
- Camogie: Kay Mills Cup

The Roscommon County Board of the Gaelic Athletic Association (GAA) (Irish: Cumann Lúthchleas Gael, Coiste Chontae Ros Comáin) or Roscommon GAA is one of the 32 county boards of the GAA in Ireland, and is responsible for Gaelic games in County Roscommon.

The county board is also responsible for the Roscommon county teams.

The county football team was the third from the province of Connacht to win an All-Ireland Senior Football Championship (SFC), following Galway and Mayo. It competes in the Connacht Senior Football Championship, which it has won 25 times. The team won back-to-back All-Ireland SFC titles in 1943 and 1944.

== Crest ==
From November 2024, the crest was altered to replace the original black-faced sheep with one of the white-faced wooly-necked found in Roscommmon.

== Football ==
=== Clubs ===
Clubs contest the Roscommon Senior Football Championship. That competition's most successful club is Clann na nGael, with 21 titles.

Roscommon GAA postponed all GAA matches that had been due to be played on the first weekend of September 2022 after referees refused to officiate. This was in response to an alleged assault on a referee in a football match at St Aidan's GAA.

=== County team ===
The county team won a first All-Ireland Senior Football Championship (SFC) in 1943, defeating Cavan in the final. The team retained the All-Ireland SFC in 1944, defeating Kerry in the final.

The county team made its third appearance in an All-Ireland SFC final in the 1946 edition. It made its fourth appearance in an All-Ireland SFC final in the 1962 edition. It made its fifth appearance in an All-Ireland SFC final in the 1980 edition. Kerry defeated Roscommon in all three of those games.

== Hurling ==
=== Clubs ===
Clubs contest the Roscommon Senior Hurling Championship. That competition's most successful club is Four Roads, with 35 titles.

=== County team ===
Roscommon's sole appearance in an All-Ireland Senior Hurling Championship (SHC) semi-final occurred in 1910. Tipperary defeated the county by a scoreline of 10 goals to one point. The county defeated Wexford in the 1984 Centenary Cup. Roscommon won an All-Ireland Senior B Hurling Championship in 1994 and an All-Ireland Intermediate Hurling Championship in 1999. The county competed in the newly formed Christy Ring Cup in 2005 and 2006 but was relegated to the Nicky Rackard Cup after poor performances. Roscommon won the 2007 Nicky Rackard Cup Final, defeating Armagh by a scoreline of 1–12 to 0–13. Roscommon won the 2015 Nicky Rackard Cup, again defeating Armagh in the final. Both games occurred at Croke Park.

== Ladies' football ==
Roscommon have the following achievements in ladies' football.

- All-Ireland Senior Ladies' Football Championships: 1
  - 1978
- All-Ireland Intermediate Ladies' Football Championships: 1
  - 2005
- All-Ireland Junior Ladies' Football Championships: 1
  - 2001

== Camogie ==
Roscommon won the Nancy Murray Cup in 2009. At underage level Roscommon U14 won the Mairead Meehan All Ireland Final in 2018 and the Mary Lynch All Ireland Final in 2022. They won the U16 C Championship in 2019 and 2022 and they won the Minor B Shield in 2021.

Four Roads won the All Ireland Junior club final in 2010 beating Corofin of Clare 1-09 to 0-06. They also reached the 2004, 2012, 2014 and 2018 All Ireland Junior club finals. Athleague reached the 2015 All Ireland Junior club.

Oran won the Caithlín Ní Thoimín Shield at Féile na nGael in 1980 and 1982, the Division 3 shield in 1989 and 1992 and the Coiste Chontae an Chláir Shield in 2004. Four Roads won the Division 6 Cup at Féile na nGael in 2019.

Notable players include Lizzie Glennon and Cait Kenny who are the only players from the county to be nominated for an " All-Star " & the following Soaring Star award winners 2009 Niamh Coyle, 2010 Caroline Connaughton, 2014 Annette McGeeney and Kelly Hopkins, 2015 Susan Spillane and Rachel Fitzmaurice and 2016 Kelly Hopkins

Under Camogie's National Development Plan 2010-2015, "Our Game, Our Passion", Carlow, Cavan, Laois, Louth and Roscommon were to get a total of 17 new clubs by 2015.
