= Cavan GAA honours =

This is a list of Gaelic Athletic Association athletes and teams who have won honours for Cavan GAA.

== Men's Football ==
=== International Rules Representatives ===
A number of Cavan players have been selected to play International rules football for the Ireland team against Australia:

Player	Appearances	Years
Jim Reilly	3	1987
Stephen King	1	1987
Dermot McCabe	2	1998, 2001
Larry Reilly	2	2000

=== All-Ireland Senior Football Championships: 5 ===
Year	Squad	Opponent	Final Score
1933	W. Young, M. Denneny, J. Smith, W. Connolly, Tom O'Reilly (Mullahoran), P. Lynch, P. Phair, H. O'Reilly, T. Coyle, L. Blessing, P. Devlin, D. Morgan, J. Smallhorn, V. McGovern, M. Magee. Subs: T. O'Reilly, T. Crowe, P. Connolly	Galway	2-05 - 1-04
1935	W. Young, W. Connolly, J. Smith, M. Denneny, T. Dolan, T. O'Reilly (Mullahoran), P. Phair, H. O'Reilly, T. O'Reilly, D. Morgan, P. Devlin, J. Smallhorn, P. Boylan, L. Blessing, M. Magee	Kildare	3-06 - 2-05
1947	V. Gannon, W. Doonan, B. O'Reilly, P. Smith, J. Wilson, J. J. O'Reilly, S. Deignan, P. J. Duke, P. Brady, A. Tighe, M. Higgins, C. McDyer, J. Stafford, P. Donohoe, T.P. O'Reilly.	Kerry	2-11 – 2-07
1948	J.D. Benson, W. Doonan, B. O'Reilly, P. Smith, P. J. Duke, J.J. O'Reilly, S. Deignan, P. Brady, V. Sherlock, A. Tighe, M. Higgins, J.J. Cassidy, J. Stafford, P. Donohoe, E. Carolan. Sub: O.R. McGovern	Mayo	4-05 – 4-04
1952; Draw	S. Morris, J. McCabe, P. Brady, D. Maguire, P. Carolan, L. Maguire, B. O'Reilly, T. Hardy, V. Sherlock, S. Hetherton, M. Higgins, E. Carolan, J.J. Cassidy, A. Tighe, P. Fitzsimons	Meath	2-04 – 1-07
Replay	S. Morris, J. McCabe, P. Brady, D. Maguire, P. Carolan, L. Maguire, B. O'Reilly, T. Hardy, V. Sherlock, S. Hetherton, M. Higgins, E. Carolan, J.J. Cassidy, A. Tighe, J. Cusack. Sub: P. Fitzsimons	Meath	0-09 – 0-05

=== All-Ireland Minor Football Championships:2 ===
Year	Squad	Opponent	Final Score
1937	J.J. Brady, M. Argue, B. Cully, T. Cully, P. Clarke, M. O'Reilly, T.P. O'Reilly, P. O'Reilly, D. Brady, P. Conaty, H. Bouchier, P. McDonnell, J. McCormack, M. Farrell, P. Fay	Kerry	1-11 - 0-08
1938	J.D. Benson, W. Doonan, B. Cully, P. Galligan, M. Reilly, P. Coyle, S. Deignan, J. Maguire, J. McCormack, K. O'Reilly, P. Conaty, M. Fitzsimons, F. Coyle, J. Johnson, P. Doyle	Wexford	3-03 - 1-05

=== All-Ireland Junior Football Championships:2 ===
- 1927, 2014

Year	Squad	Opponent	Final Score
1927	J. Morgan, J. Martin, T. Crowe, G. Malcolmson, F. Fitzpatrick, L. Flaherty, H. O'Reilly, P. Devlin, T. Corr, F. Reid, P.J. O'Reilly, L. Mallon, A. Conlon, P. Lynch, J.P. Dolan	Kildare	0-07 - 0-03
2014	1. James Farrelly, 2. Damien Barkey, 3. James Morris, 4. Fergal Reilly, 5. Ciaran Brady, 6. Brian Sankey, 7. Paul Smith, 8. Liam Buchanan, 9. Packie Leddy (c), 10. Conor Moynagh, 11. Chris Conroy, 12. Enda Reilly, 13. Tom Hayes, 14. Enda Hession, 15. Paul O’Connor	Kerry	2-14 - 0–14

=== National Football Leagues:2 ===
Year	Squad	Opponent	Final Score
1947/48	J.D. Benson, W. Doonan, B. O'Reilly, P. Smith, P. J. Duke, J.J. O'Reilly, S. Deignan, P. Brady, V. Sherlock, A. Tighe, M. Higgins, J.J. Cassidy, J. Stafford, P. Donohoe, E. Carolan (probable team)	Cork	5-09 - 2-08 (Replay)
1949/50	S. Morris, W. Doonan, B. O'Reilly, P. Smith, O.R. McGovern, J.J. O'Reilly, S. Deignan, P. J. Duke, P. Brady, A. Tighe, M. Higgins, J.J. Cassidy, J. Stafford, P. Donohoe, E. Carolan. Sub: T.P. O'Reilly	Meath	2-09 - 1-06

=== Ulster Senior Football Championships:40 ===
- 1891, 1903, 1904, 1905, 1915, 1918, 1919, 1920, 1922, 1923, 1924, 1925, 1926, 1928, 1931, 1932, 1933, 1934, 1935, 1936, 1937, 1939, 1940, 1941, 1942, 1943, 1944, 1945, 1947, 1948, 1949, 1952, 1954, 1955, 1962, 1964, 1967, 1969, 1997, 2020

Year	Squad	Opponent	Final Score
1997	Paul O’Dowd, Philip Kermath, Ciarán Brady, Terry Farrelly, Gerry Sheridan, Bernard Morris, Patrick Shiels, Stephen King, Dermot McCabe, Peter Reilly, Ronan Carolan (10pts), Ray Cunningham (1pt), Larry Reilly (2pts), Fintan Cahill, Damien O'Reilly. Used Suds: Philip Smith, Jason Reilly (1-1), Mickey Graham, Antony Forde.	Derry	1-14 - 0–16

=== Ulster Under-21 Football Championships: 6 ===
- 1988, 1996, 2011, 2012, 2013, 2014

Year	Squad	Opponent	Final Score
2011	A. O’Mara, M. Leddy, O. Minagh, D. Tighe, K. Meehan, D. Barkey, M. Brady(Capt), G. McKiernan (Capt)(0–2), F. Flanagan, N. Smith, N. Murray (1–0), B. Reilly (0–2), J. Brady (0–4), N. McDermott, P. Leddy. Subs used: T. Mooney, P. King (0–2), C. McClarey, C. Smith, D. Flanagan.	Tyrone	1-10 - 0–10
2012	C. Gilsenan, F. Flanagan, K. Brady, J. McLoughlin, D. Sexton (1–0, pen), C. Moynagh, M. Brady (Capt), P. Leddy, K. Clarke, J. Dillon (0–1), C. Conroy, R Lynch (0–1), J. Brady (0–3, 2f), K. Tierney (0–5, 5f), N. O’Donnell. Subs Used: P. King, B. Reilly, S. Nolan, P.P. O’Hara.	Tyrone	1-10 - 0–10
2013	C. Gilsenan, J. McLoughlin, K. Clarke, C. Brady, D. McVeety, D. Sexton, F. Flanagan, B. Sankey, M. Argue, G. Smith (0–2), C. Conroy (0–3), T. Mooney, E. O’Reilly (0–2, 1f), P. O’Connor (0–1), J. Brady 0–4, 4f). Subs Used: C. Madden, P. Graham (0–1), C. Moynagh	Donegal	0-13 - 1-06
2014	J. Farrelly, B. Fortune (0–1), K. Clarke, P. Faulkner, G. Smith, C. Moynagh (Capt), C. Brady, L. Buchanan (1–0), M. Argue (0–1), P. Graham, E. Flanagan, A. Watson, D. McVeety, K. Bouchier (0–3, 3f), J. Dillon (1-1, 1f). Subs Used: A. O’Hara, T. Hayes, E. Hession.	Donegal	2-06 - 0-08

=== Ulster Minor Football Championships: 6 ===
- 1937, 1938, 1952, 1959, 1974, 2011

Year	Squad	Opponent	Final Score
2011	B O’Mara; B Sankey, K Clarke, C Smith; C Brady, C Moynagh, G Smith (0–1); M Argue (0–1), P Graham (0–1); A Dewart, J Dillon (0–1), K Boucher; A Graham (0–3), C Finnegan (0–2), D McVeety (0–1). Subs: N O’Donnell (0–2, 0-1 free) for Boucher, L Buchanan for Dewart, V Coyle for Dillon.	Armagh	0-12 - 1–06

=== Ulster Junior Football Championships: 14 ===
- 1914, 1915, 1916, 1924, 1927, 1932, 1936, 1938, 1940, 1941, 1944, 1957, 1962, 1984

=== Leinster Junior Football Championships: 2 ===
- 2012, 2014

Year	Squad	Opponent	Final Score
2012	J. Farrelly, F. Slowey, R. Dunne, D. Tighe, J. Hayes, D. Barkey, B. Watters (0–1), K. Brady, D. McKiernan (0–3, 3f), C. Conroy, M. Reilly (0–2, 2 45's), K. Fannin, C. McClarey (1–0), B. McKiernan, M. Dunne (0–5, 2f). Subs used: P. O'Connor (0–2), B. O'Leary, O. O'Connell, J. Morris.	Kildare	1-13 - 0-09
2014	J Farrelly; D Barkey, J Morris, F Relly; P Tinnelly (0–1), B Doyle, P Smith (1–0); L Buchanan (0–1), P Leddy; Enda Reilly (0–6, 5f), C Conroy, D Wright; P O'Connor (0–2), C Moynagh, T Moore. Subs: T Hayes (0–1) for T Moore, B Sankey for P Leddy, C Brady for J Morris, E Hession for P Smith, N Clerkin for C Conroy, F Smith for P Tinnelly.	Longford	1-11 - 1-07

=== Dr McKenna Cup: 11 ===
- 1936, 1940, 1943, 1951, 1953, 1955, 1956, 1962, 1968, 1988, 2000

== Hurling ==
=== Ulster Senior Hurling Championship ===
- Represented Ulster in the 1908 All-Ireland series, but lost the delayed Ulster final for that year when it was played (the following year) to Derry.

=== Ulster Junior Hurling Championship: 2 ===
- 1983, 1985

=== All-Ireland Minor Hurling Championship: None ===
- All-Ireland Minor 'C' Finalists 2012

=== Ulster Minor Hurling Championship: 1 ===
- Division 2 - 2014

=== Ulster Minor Hurling League: 1 ===
- Division 2 - 2014

=== National Hurling League: 2 ===
- Division 4 - 1984
- Division 3b - 2023

== Ladies Football ==
=== All-Ireland Senior Ladies' Football Championship: 1 ===
- 1977

=== All-Ireland Intermediate Ladies' Football Championship: 1 ===
- 2013

=== All-Ireland Under-18 Ladies' Football Championship: 1 ===
- 2024

=== All-Ireland Under-16 Ladies' Football Championship: 3 ===
- 1977, 2023, 2024

=== National Football League: 2 ===
- Division 3 - 2008, 2010, 2025

== Camogie ==
=== National Camogie Leagues: 1 ===
- Division 2 - 1981

=== All-Ireland Junior Camogie Championships: 1 ===
- Junior B - 2009

== Handball ==
=== 40x20 All-Ireland Championship ===
Senior Singles

	Name	Wins	Years won
1	P. Brady	10	2003, 2005, 2006, 2007, 2008, 2009, 2010, 2011, 2012, 2013

Senior Doubles

	Name	Wins	Years won
1	P. Brady and M. Finnegan	9	2003, 2004, 2006, 2007, 2008, 2010, 2011, 2012, 2013

Intermediate Singles

	Name	Wins	Years won
1	M. Finnegan	1	1997
2	P. Brady	1	1999

Intermediate Doubles

	Name	Wins	Years won
1	M. Finnegan and R. Cunningham	1	1997

Minor Singles

	Name	Wins	Years won
1	M. Finnegan	3	1992, 1993, 1994
2	P. Brady	1	1998

Minor Doubles

	Name	Wins	Years won
1	M. Finnegan and D. Bartley	1	1992
1	M. Finnegan and R. Cunningham	1	1993
1	M. Finnegan and C. McDonnell	1	1994

=== 40x20 Nationals ===
Open

	Name	Wins	Years won
1	P. Brady	3	2005, 2009, 2010,

Men's C

	Name	Wins	Years won
1	P. Clerkin	1	2008

=== Hardball All-Ireland Championship ===
Minor Doubles

	Name	Wins	Years won
1	M. Finnegan and R. Cunningham	1	1993
1	M. Finnegan and N. Doyle	1	1994

Junior Doubles

	Name	Wins	Years won
1	G. Sheridan and D. Sheridan	1	1977
1	P. Hyland and P. Donagh	1	1985

=== Irish One Wall Nationals ===
Men's Open

	Name	Wins	Years won
1	P. Brady	1	2008

Men's B

	Name	Wins	Years won
1	P. Fitzpatrick	1	2006

U17

	Name	Wins	Years won
1	P. Brady	1	1997

== See also ==
- Cavan Senior Football Championship
