= 1948 All-Ireland Senior Football Championship final =

- Event: 1948 All-Ireland Senior Football Championship
Cavan	Mayo
4–5 (17)	4–4 (16)
- Date: 26 September 1948
- Venue: Croke Park, Dublin
- Referee: M. J. Flatherty (Offaly)
- Attendance: 74,645
- Weather: Windy

The 1948 All-Ireland Senior Football Championship final was the 61st All-Ireland Final and the deciding match of the 1948 All-Ireland Senior Football Championship, an inter-county Gaelic football tournament for the top teams in Ireland. Contested by a team from the Ulster (Cavan) and a team from Connacht (Mayo), such a meeting in the decider between teams from these provinces would not happen again until 2012.

This was the last time Cavan defeated Mayo in a championship game until 2025.

== Pre-match ==
Cavan were the defending All-Ireland SFC title holders.

== Match ==
=== Summary ===
Cavan retained the title they had won in 1947 at Polo Grounds in Manhattan, New York City.

In a heavy wind, Cavan led 3–2 to 0–0 at half-time, but Mayo came back to lead the game. Cavan eventually made it two-in-a-row with a Peter Donohoe point. This final's eight goals is the most scored in a final, a record shared with the 1977 match.

=== Details ===
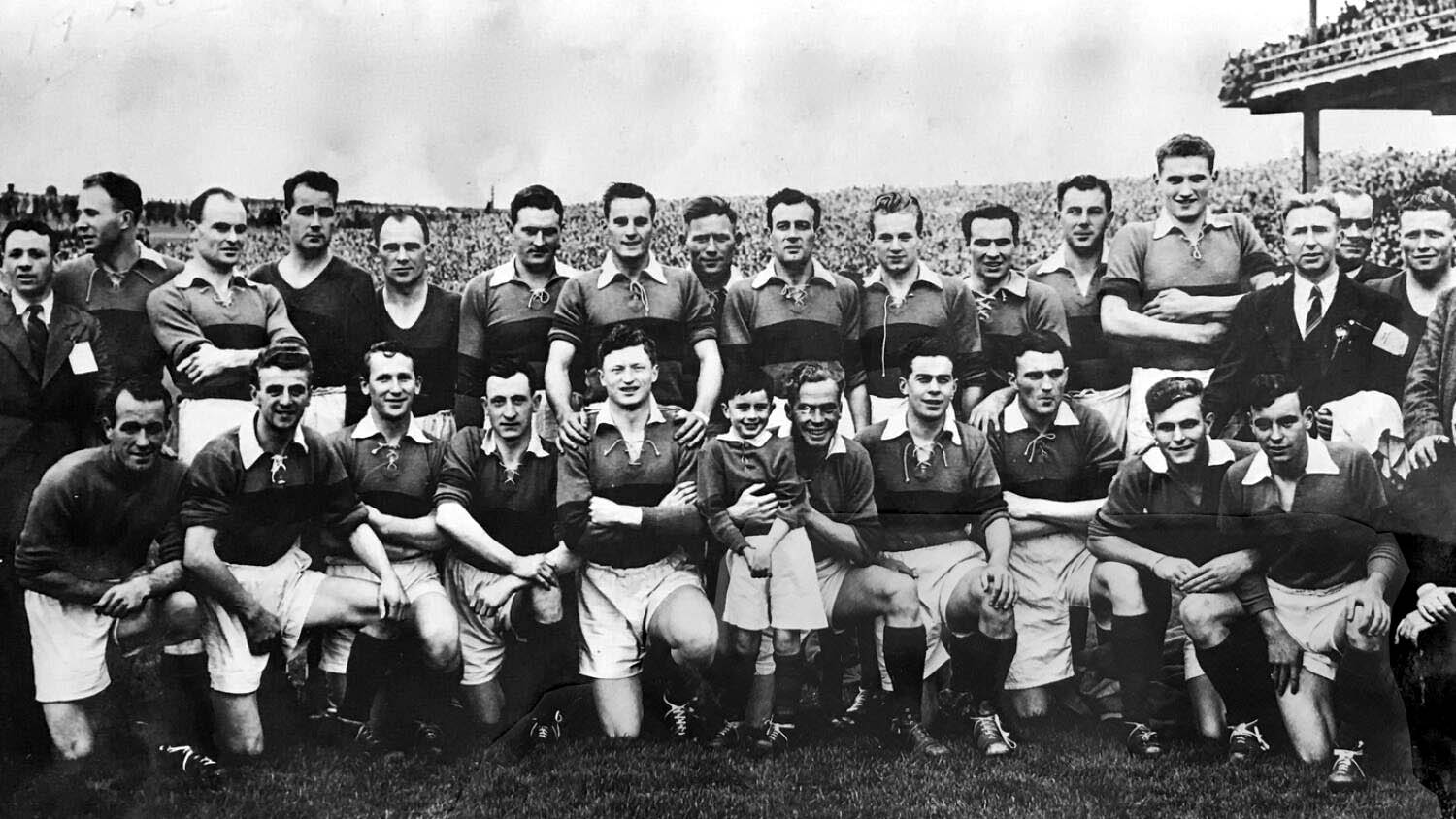
Mayo team, runners-up

26 Sep 1948
Final

Cavan	4–5 – 4–4	Mayo
Gls: Peter Donohoe (0–4), Victor Sherlock (0–1); Pts: Tony Tighe (2–0), Victor Sherlock, Mick Higgins (1–0) each		Gls: P Carney, P Solan (1–0) each, T Acton (2–0); Pts: E Mongey (0–1), P Carney (0–2, penalty goal and a free), S Mulderrig (0–1)

Croke Park, Dublin
Referee: M. J. Flatherty (Offaly)
Attendance: 74,645

Cavan	Mayo

==== Cavan team ====
1 Des Benson 2 Willie Doonan 3 Brian O'Reilly 4 Paddy Smith 5 P. J. Duke 6 John Joe O'Reilly (c) 7 Simon Deignan 8 Phil Brady 9 Victor Sherlock 10 Tony Tighe 11 Mick Higgins 12 John Joe Cassidy 13 Joe Stafford 14 Peter Donohoe 15 Edwin Carolan

Sub used

17 Owen Roe McGovern

Subs not used

16 Barney Cully 18 T. P. O'Reilly 19 John Wilson 20 Val Gannon 21 Seamus Morris

==== Mayo team ====
1 Tommy Byrne 2 Peter Quinn 3 Paddy Prendergast 4 Seán Flanagan 5 John Forde (c) 6 P. McAndrew 7 Johnny Gilvarry 8 Éamonn Mongey 9 Pádraig Carney 10 Billy Kenny 11 Tommy Langan 12 Joe Gilvarry 13 Tom Acton 14 Peter Solan 15 Seán Mulderrig

Subs not used

16 Mick Flanagann 17 Liam Hastings 18 Paddy Gilvarry 19 M. McNamara 20 Henry Dixon 21 J. Munnelly 22 P. Jordan 23 S. Daly
