= 1948 All-Ireland Senior Football Championship =

Football championship

All-Ireland Champions
- Winning team: Cavan (4th win)
- Captain: John Joe O'Reilly

All-Ireland Finalists
- Losing team: Mayo
- Captain: John Forde

Provincial Champions
- Munster: Kerry
- Leinster: Louth
- Ulster: Cavan
- Connacht: Mayo

Championship statistics

The 1948 All-Ireland Senior Football Championship was the 62nd staging of Ireland's premier Gaelic football knock-out competition.

Fermanagh play their last Ulster championship game until 1960.

Limerick take a 2-year break from the Munster championship.

Cavan won their second title in a row.

== Results ==
=== Connacht Senior Football Championship ===
13 June 1948
Quarter-Final

Mayo	4–9 – 1–2	Leitrim
P Carney (0–4, two frees), W Kenny (1–3), T Langan, S Daly (1–1), P Solan (1–0) & S Mulderrig (1–1).

Sligo

20 June 1948
Semi-Final

Galway	3–4 – 1–4	Roscommon

Dunlo GAA Grounds, Ballinasloe

27 June 1948
Semi-Final

Mayo	4–2 – 1–5	Sligo
P Carney (0–1), S Daly (0–1) & P Solan (3–1).

Sligo

==== Finals ====
18 July 1948
Final

Mayo	2–4 – 1–7	Galway
T Langan (1–0), S Daly (0–1), P Solan (1–0), S Mulderrig (0–3, two frees).

St. Coman's Park, Roscommon
Referee: Simon Duignan (Cavan)

25 July 1948
Final Replay

Mayo	2–10 – 2–7 A.E.T.	Galway
P Carney (0–9, six frees), P Solan (1–1) & S Mulderrig (0–1).

St. Coman's Park, Roscommon
Referee: P.J. Sheehy (Longford)

=== Leinster Senior Football Championship ===
2 May 1948
Preliminary Round

Carlow	3–11 – 1–5	Wicklow

Enniscorthy

9 May 1948
Preliminary Round

Louth	2–14 – 1–2	Longford

Páirc Tailteann, Navan

9 May 1948
Preliminary Round

Offaly	5–5 – 1–8	Kildare
		T.O'Hanlon 0–5, J.Farrell 1–0, C.O'Hanlon 0–2, M.Geraghty 0–1.

O'Moore Park, Portlaoise
Referee: W Delaney (Laois)

2 May 1948
Quarter-Final

Meath	0–14 – 1–6	Westmeath

Cusack Park, Mullingar

16 May 1948
Quarter-Final

Carlow	4–4 – 1–7	Laois

Geraldine Park, Athy

6 June 1948
Quarter-Final

Offaly	3–8 – 4–6	Wexford

Dr. Cullen Park, Carlow
Referee: W Delaney (Laois)

13 June 1948
Quarter-Final

Louth	1–8 – 0–6	Dublin

Croke Park, Dublin

4 July 1948
Semi-Final

Wexford	3–9 – 4–5	Carlow

Croke Park, Dublin

11 July 1948
Semi-Final

Meath	2–6 – 2–5	Louth

Croke Park, Dublin

==== Final ====
25 July 1948

Louth	2–10 – 2–05	Wexford
M. Hardy 1–4 (0-3f), K. Connolly 1–0, J. Quigley 0–3, H. O'Rourke 0–2, F. Fagan 0–1		B. Kelly 2–1, D. O'Neill 0–2, W. Goodison ('45), S. Thorpe 0–1 each

Croke Park, Dublin
Referee: Jimmy Flaherty (Offaly)

GK	1	Seán Thornton (Civil Service, Dublin)
RCB	2	Jack Bell (Stabannon Parnells)
FB	3	Eddie Boyle (Seán McDermotts, Dublin)
LCB	4	Johnny Malone (St Mary's)
RHB	5	Seán Boyle (St Mary's)
CHB	6	Paddy Markey (St Mary's)
LHB	7	Jimmy McDonnell (Darver Volunteers)
MF	8	Ray Mooney (St Mary's)
MF	9	Kevin Connolly (Cooley Kickhams)
RHF	10	Mick Hardy (Cooley Kickhams)
CHF	11	Stephen White (Cooley Kickhams)
LHF	12	Frank Fagan (Dundalk Young Irelands)
RCF	13	Larry Carr (Oliver Plunketts)
FF	14	Jim Quigley (Dundalk Young Irelands) (c)
LCF	15	Hugh O'Rourke (Cooley Kickhams)
Substitutes:
	16	Paddy McArdle (St Mary's) for Mooney

GK	1	Joe O'Neill (Clonee)
RCB	2	Jackie Culleton (St John's Volunteers)
FB	3	Jim Cullen (St Anne's)
LCB	4	Jim Coady (Guinness, Dublin)
RHB	5	Jim Rogers (Blackwater)
CHB	6	Willie Goodison (St John's Volunteers)
LHB	7	John Morris (St John's Volunteers)
MF	8	Seán Eustace (St Aidan's, Ballymitty)
MF	9	Dermot Clancy (Ballinglen)
RHF	10	Des O'Neill (Rathnure)
CHF	11	Nicky Rackard (Rathnure)
LHF	12	Paddy Kehoe (Gusserane O'Rahilly's) (c)
RCF	13	John O'Connor (St John's Volunteers)
FF	14	Billy Kelly (St Aidan's, Ballymitty)
LCF	15	Sam Thorpe (Slaney Harriers)
Substitutes:
	16	Mick O'Hanlon (Gusserane O'Rahilly's) for Eustace
	17	Paddy Waters (St Aidan's, Ballymitty) for Cullen

=== Munster Senior Football Championship ===
30 May 1948
Quarter-Final

Clare	4–10 – 0–2	Limerick

Cusack Park, Ennis

20 June 1948
Quarter-Final

Tipperary	3–13 – 1–7	Waterford

Páirc MacGearailt, Fermoy
Referee: S. O'Boyle (Tipperary)

4 July 1948
Semi-Final

Kerry	6–6 – 1–8	Clare
G. O'Sullivan (1–0), W. O'Donnell (3–2), B. Garvey (1–2) & B. Kelliher (1–1).

Ballylongford

4 July 1948
Semi-Final

Cork	0–12 – 1–8	Tipperary
T. Crowley (0–1), C. McGrath (0–1), N. Duggan (0–3), J. Lynam (0–1), J. Cronin (0–5) & J. Aherne (0–1).

Fraher Field, Dungarvan
Referee: P. Ryan (W)

==== Final ====
25 July 1948
Final

Kerry	2–9 – 2–6	Cork
B. Garvey (0–1), D. Kavanagh (0–1), M. McCarthy (1–0) & Tom Gega O'Connor (1–6).		J. Harnett (1–0), C. McGrath (0–4), N. Duggan (0–2) & J. Aherne (0–1).

Fitzgerald Stadium, Killarney

=== Ulster Senior Football Championship ===
13 June 1948
Preliminary Round

Down	5–7 – 2–3	Armagh

St. Patrick's Park, Newcastle

6 June 1948
Quarter-Final

Antrim	1–3 – 0–1 Unfinished	Donegal

Corrigan Park, Belfast

6 June 1948
Quarter-Final

Derry	2–6 – 2–9	Monaghan

St. Tiernach's Park, Clones

13 June 1948
Quarter-Final

Tyrone	5–8 – 0–4	Fermanagh

O'Neill Park, Dungannon

20 June 1948
Quarter-Final

Cavan	2–9 – 2–4	Down
P Donohoe (2–3), M Higgins (0–6)		M Shortt (1–0), Kennedy (1–0), G Brown (0–1), Downey (0–1), Keenan (0–1), B Carr (0–1)

The Playing Fields, Lurgan

20 June 1948
Quarter-Final Replay

Antrim	4–5 – 1–4	Donegal

Corrigan Park, Belfast

4 July 1948
Semi-Final

Antrim	0–12 – 1–3	Tyrone

The Playing Fields, Lurgan

11 July 1948
Semi-Final

Cavan	1–9 – 0–7	Monaghan
P Donohoe (0–6), J J O Reilly (0–1), J Cassidy (0–1) M Higgins (0–1), T Tighe (1–0)		P Mc Donald (0–3), V Duffy (0–1), M Finnegan (0–2), P O Rouke (0–1)

Breffni Park, Cavan
Attendance: 14,000

==== Final ====
25 July 1948
Final

Cavan	2–12 – 2–4	Antrim
P Donohoe (1–4), J Cassidy (0–2), Ed Carolan (1–2), M Higgins (0–2) S Deignan (0–1), T Tighe (0–1)		B Mc Ateer (1–0), J Mc Callin (0–3)

St. Tiernach's Park, Clones

=== All-Ireland Senior Football Championship ===
==== Semi-Final ====
22 August 1948
Semi-Final

Cavan	1–14 – 4–02	Louth
P. Donohoe 0–8 (7f), M. Higgins 0–5 (1f), T. Tighe 1–0, E. Carolan 0–1		M. Hardy 2–0, F. Fagan 1–2, R. Mooney 1–0

Croke Park, Dublin
Attendance: 51,117
Referee: M. Colbert (Limerick)

GK	1	Des Benson (Croghan)
RCB	2	Willie Doonan (Cavan Harps)
FB	3	Brian O'Reilly (Mullahoran)
LCB	4	Paddy Smith (St Mary's, Louth)
RHB	5	P. J. Duke (Stradone)
CHB	6	John Joe O'Reilly (Curragh, Kildare) (c)
LHB	7	Simon Deignan (12th Battalion, Limerick)
MF	8	Phil Brady (Mullahoran)
MF	9	Victor Sherlock (Kingscourt Stars)
RHF	10	Tony Tighe (Mountnugent)
CHF	11	Mick Higgins (Oliver Plunketts, Louth)
LHF	12	John Joe Cassidy (Banba, Dublin)
RCF	13	Joe Stafford (Clanna Gael, Dublin)
FF	14	Peter Donohoe (Banba, Dublin)
LCF	15	Edwin Carolan (UCD, Dublin)
Substitutes:

GK	1	Seán Thornton (Civil Service, Dublin)
RCB	2	Jack Bell (Stabannon Parnells)
FB	3	Eddie Boyle (Seán McDermotts, Dublin)
LCB	4	Johnny Malone (St Mary's)
RHB	5	Seán Boyle (St Mary's)
CHB	6	Paddy Markey (St Mary's)
LHB	7	Jimmy McDonnell (Darver Volunteers)
MF	8	Ray Mooney (St Mary's)
MF	9	Kevin Connolly (Cooley Kickhams)
RHF	10	Mick Hardy (Cooley Kickhams)
CHF	11	Stephen White (Cooley Kickhams)
LHF	12	Frank Fagan (Dundalk Young Irelands)
RCF	13	Larry Carr (Oliver Plunketts)
FF	14	Jim Quigley (Dundalk Young Irelands) (c)
LCF	15	Mickey Reynolds (Stabannon Parnells)
Substitutes:
	16	Jack Regan (Dundalk Gaels) for White

==== Semi-Final ====
29 August 1948
Semi-Final

Mayo	0–13 – 0–3	Kerry
P Carney (0–1, free); W Kenny (0–2), T Langan (0–3), Joe Gilvarry (0–1); T Acton (0–1), P Solan (0–3), S Mulderrig (0–1).		Eddie Dowling (0–1) & Tom Gega O'Connor (0–2).

Croke Park, Dublin
Attendance: 51,305

==== Final ====
26 September 1948
Final

Cavan	4–5 – 4–4	Mayo
P Donohoe (0–4), T Tighe (2–0), V Sherlock (1–1), M Higgins (1–0)		E Mongey (0–1), P Carney (1–2, penalty goal and a free), T Acton (2–0), P Solan (1–0) & S Mulderrig (0–1).

Croke Park, Dublin
Attendance: 74,645
Referee: M.J. Flatherty (Offaly)

== Championship statistics ==
=== Miscellaneous ===
- Fermanagh withdraw from Ulster championship until 1960.
- Limerick withdraw from Munster championship for the next 2 years.
- The All Ireland semi-final between Cavan and Louth was their first championship meeting.
- Cavan becomes the first county from Ulster to be All Ireland Champions for 2 in a row.

== Roll of Honour ==
- Kerry – 16 (1946)
- Dublin – 15 (1942)
- Wexford – 5 (1918)
- Cavan – 4 (1948)
- Kildare – 4 (1928)
- Tipperary – 4 (1920)
- Cork – 3 (1945)
- Galway – 3 (1938)
- Roscommon – 2 (1944)
- Limerick – 2 (1896)
- Louth – 2 (1912)
- Mayo – 1 (1936)
