= 1947 All-Ireland Senior Football Championship final =

- Official programme
- Event: 1947 All-Ireland Senior Football Championship
Cavan	Kerry
2–11 (17)	2–7 (13)
- Date: 14 September 1947
- Venue: Polo Grounds, New York City
- Referee: M O'Neill (Wexford)
- Attendance: 34,491
- Weather: 86 °F (30 °C)

The 1947 All-Ireland Senior Football Championship final was the sixtieth All-Ireland Final and the deciding match of the 1947 All-Ireland Senior Football Championship, an inter-county Gaelic football tournament for the top teams in Ireland. Cavan were captained by John Joe O'Reilly.

== Pre-game ==
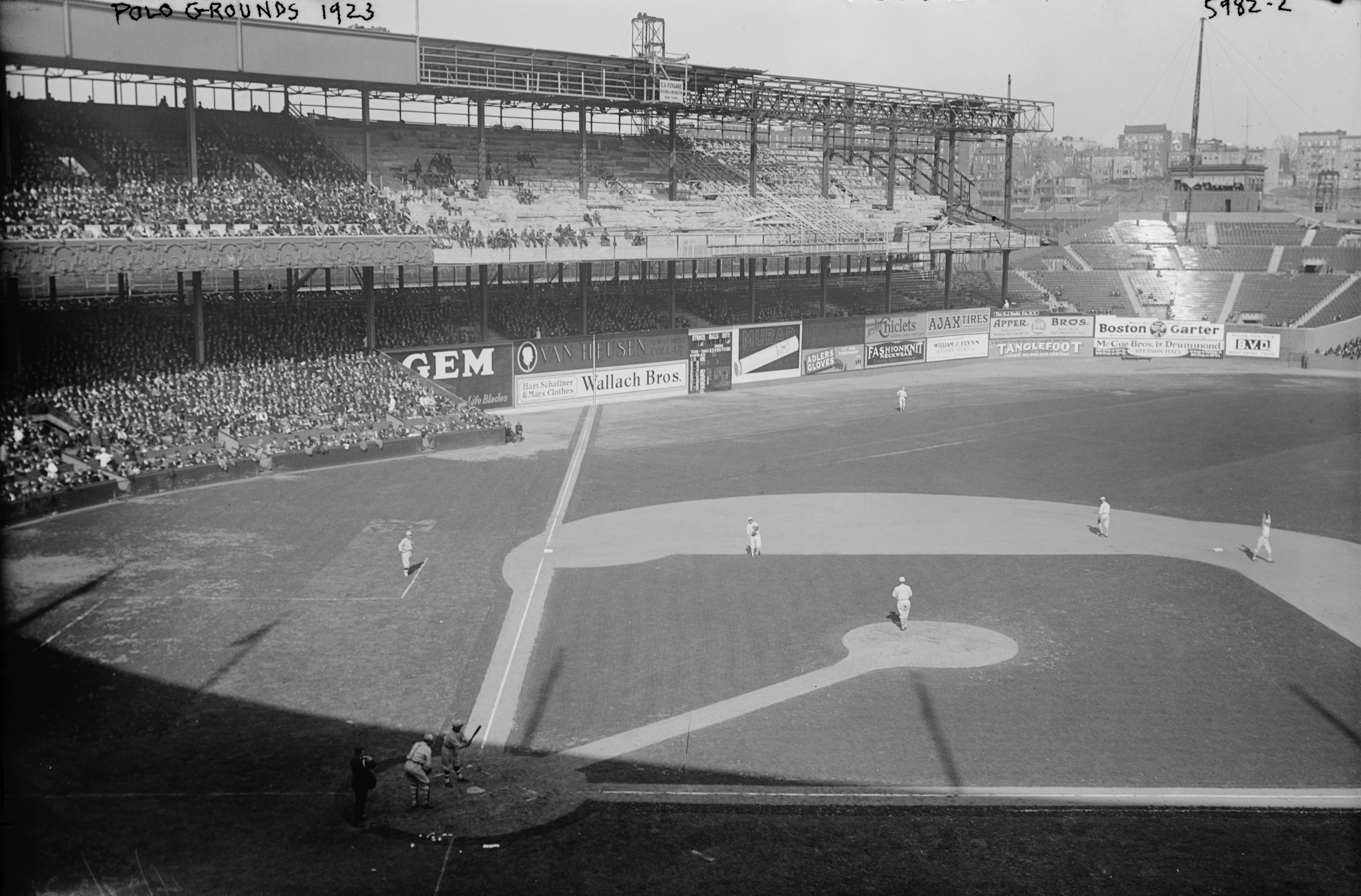
Polo Grounds in New York City, used for American sports, hosted the match.

For the first and only time, the final was played outside Ireland, at Polo Grounds in New York City, to cater for the large Irish-American community there. The New York final was also intended to observe the centenary of the Great Famine, which caused mass Irish emigration to the U.S. and other countries.

It was decided that New York would host this match as a commemoration of the 1847 Great Famine, which forced a large number of Irish people to emigrate to North America. This novel location for the game was chosen for the benefit of New York's large Irish immigrant population. It was the only time for the final to have been played outside Ireland.

Around 30,000 people were in the ground for the final. Cavan travelled by air and Kerry by sea; the Cavan team credited their victory partially to their shorter time spent travelling. The Cavan team flew via the Azores, taking 30 hours. Kerry's trip by Ocean Liner took far longer. The last Gaelic game held at Polo Grounds was on 1 June 1958, when Cavan played New York.

Mick Higgins, a key member of the Cavan team that day, recalled in later life: "There was no huge send-off for us in Cavan, but both teams got a good reception in New York when we arrived. I remember the team stayed in the Commodore Hotel, but I stayed with my relatives." He also remembered there was "oppressive heat" during the game itself.

The Artane Boys' Band travelled to New York to play before the match, as they do traditionally at all All-Ireland finals.

== Match ==
This year's final was played on 14 September.

=== Summary ===
After a slow start, Cavan fought back to lead 2–5 to 2–4 at the break, and went on to win by four points. Peter Donohoe scored eight points from frees, and the New York press called him "the Babe Ruth of Gaelic football" (Babe Ruth was a local baseball player of the time). Michael O'Hehir broadcast radio commentary back across the Atlantic Ocean.

O'Hehir noticed that broadcasting delays would bring the radio link down five minutes before the final had ended. O'Hehir later recalled his plea:'"If there's anybody along the way there listening in, just give us five minutes more, and I kept begging for five minutes more". The link stayed open.

=== Details ===
14 September 1947
Final

Cavan	2–11 – 2–7	Kerry
Peter Donohoe (0–8), Mick Higgins (1–1), T. P. O'Reilly (1–1), Columba McDyer (0–1)		Eddie Dowling (1–0), Batt Garvey (1–0), Tom Gega O'Connor (0–6), Paddy Kennedy (0–1)

Polo Grounds, New York City
Attendance: 34,491
Referee: M O'Neill (Wexford)

Cavan
Kerry

==== Cavan team ====
1 Val Gannon 2 Willie Doonan 3 Brian O'Reilly 4 Paddy Smith 5 John Wilson 6 John Joe O'Reilly (c) 7 Simon Deignan 8 P. J. Duke 9 Phil Brady 10 Tony Tighe 11 Mick Higgins 12 Columba McDyer 13 Joe Stafford 14 Peter Donohoe 15 T. P. O'Reilly

Cavan subs not used

16 Edwin Carolan 17 Terry Sheridan 18 Owen Roe McGovern 19 John Joe Cassidy 20 Tom O'Reilly 21 Eunan Tiernan 22 Brendan Kelly

==== Kerry team ====
1 D. O'Keeffe 2 D. Lyne (c) 3 J. Keohane 4 P. B. Brosnan 5 J. Lyne 6 B. Casey 7 E. Walsh 8 E. Dowling 9 Teddy O'Connor 17 T. O'Sullivan 15 D. Kavanagh 12 B. Garvey 13 F. O'Keeffe 14 Tom O'Connor 22 P. Kennedy

Kerry subs used

11 W. O'Donnell for T. Brosnan 18 M. Finucane for E. Walsh 16 T. Brosnan for W. O'Donnell 21 G. Teahan for P. Kennedy

Kerry subs not used

10 G. O'Sullivan 19 T. Long 20 S. Keane

== Post-match ==
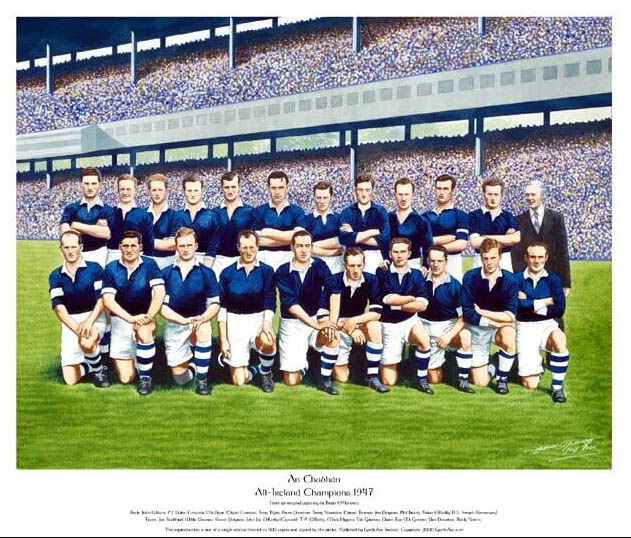
A Cavan team of 1947

The Cavan team returned to Ireland aboard the RMS Queen Mary. Higgins recalled, "It was only after we arrived in Southampton that we realised the joy of it all. Large numbers of Cavan people turned up to see us in London and Birmingham. We were treated like kings in Cavan."

The 1947 All-Ireland SFC final brought about an understanding that a large audience existed for Gaelic games highlights.

Owen Roe McGovern, the last surviving member of the winning team, died on 2 May 2011.

This was the last All-Ireland SFC final to be played on 14 September until the 2019 replay.
