= GAA Football Team of the Century =

Gaelic football team

The Gaelic Football Team of the Century was chosen in 1984 to honour the best Gaelic football players from the first 100 years of the Gaelic Athletic Association (GAA). The team consisted of a fifteen-member side, with one goalkeeper, three half-backs, two midfielders, three half-forwards and three full-forwards.

A team was also selected of players who had never won an All-Ireland.

== History ==
The selection of the team took the form of a competition and was jointly sponsored by the Sunday Independent and Irish Nationwide Building Society. Beginning on 17 June 1984, Sunday Independent readers were asked to submit ballot papers with their own personal selections for a team of the century. Votes were counted and collated and passed on to the official panel of adjudicators or "selectors" who had the final decision.

The panel of adjudicators featured a number of administrative officials from the GAA, as well as GAA historians and journalists from the print and broadcast media. GAA President Paddy Buggy, GAA director-general Liam Mulvihill and Irish Nationwide managing-director Michael Fingleton acted as patrons in a non-voting capacity over the adjudicating panel. Sunday Independent editor Aengus Fanning was chairman. The panel of adjudicators featured Mick Dunne, Mitchel V. Cogley, Raymond Smith, Séamus Ó Ceallaigh, Bertie Donohoe, John Dowling, Gerry Arthurs and John Barry.

== Possible players ==
The Sunday Independent published lists of players for each position so its readers could "refresh their memories and stimulate debate." These lists were published over successive weeks.

- Goalkeepers: Dan O'Keeffe (Kerry), Paddy Cullen (Dublin), Johnny Culloty (Kerry), Johnny Geraghty (Galway), Willie Nolan (Offaly), Paddy O'Flaherty (Dublin), Jack Mangan (Galway), Eddie McKay (Down), Martin Furlong (Offaly) and Charlie Nelligan (Kerry).
- Right corner-backs: Enda Colleran (Galway), John Forde (Mayo), Billy Myers (Kerry), Bobby Beggs (Dublin), Mick O'Brien (Meath), Jerome O'Shea (Kerry), Jimmy Deenihan (Kerry), Gay O'Driscoll (Dublin).
- Full-backs: Paddy Prendergast (Mayo), Joe Barrett (Kerry), Joe Keohane (Kerry), Noel Tierney (Galway), Paddy O'Brien (Meath), Leo Murphy (Down), Jack Quinn (Meath), John O'Keeffe (Kerry).
- Left corner-backs: Seán Flanagan (Mayo), Kevin McConnell (Meath), Mixie Palmer (Kerry), Bosco McDermott (Galway), Robbie Kelleher (Dublin), Paudie Lynch (Kerry), Purty Kelly (Mayo), Donie O'Sullivan (Kerry).
- Right wing-backs: Seán Murphy (Kerry), Brendan Lynch (Roscommon), P. J. Duke (Cavan), Jackie Lyne (Kerry), Eugene Mulligan (Offaly), Cathal O'Leary (Dublin), Seán Boyle (Louth), Páidí Ó Sé (Kerry), Tommy Drumm (Dublin), John Donnellan (Galway), Pat Canavan (Dublin).
- Centre-backs: John Joe O'Reilly (Cavan), Jim Crowley (Dublin), Kevin Moran (Dublin), Bill Dillon (Kerry), Bill Carlos (Roscommon), Pat McAndrew (Mayo), Jack Higgins (Kildare), Jim Smith (Cavan), Tom Molloy (Galway), Tim Kennelly (Kerry), Henry Dixon (Mayo), Tommy Drumm (Dublin).
- Left wing-backs: Martin Newell (Galway), Stephen White (Louth), Michael O'Shea (Kerry), Joe Lennon (Down), Eddie Walsh (Kerry), Simon Deignan (Cavan), John Forde (Mayo), Christo Hand (Meath), Seán Quinn (Armagh), Pat Reynolds (Meath).
- Midfielders: Pat O'Shea (Kerry), Gundy Fitzgerald (Kildare), Owen Markey (Louth), Johnny Doyle (Wexford), Paddy McDonnell (Dublin), Joe Loughlin (Kildare), Paddy Loughlin (Kildare), Con Brosnan (Kerry), Bob Stack (Kerry), Patsy Flannelly (Mayo), Henry Kenny (Mayo, Tommy Murphy (Laois), Paddy Kennedy (Kerry), Seán Brosnan (Kerry), Johnny Walsh (Kerry), Paddy Smith (Cavan), Tom O'Reilly (Cavan), John Dunne (Galway), John Burke (Galway), Jim Morris (Carlow), Luke Kelly (Carlow), Éamonn Boland (Roscommon), Liam Gilmartin (Roscommon), Phil Brady (Cavan), Victor Sherlock (Cavan), Pádraig Carney (Mayo), Éamonn Mongey (Mayo), John Dowling (Kerry), Frank Evers (Galway), Eric Ryan (Cork), Seán Moore (Cork), Jim McKeever (Derry), Mick O'Connell (Kerry), Joe Lennon (Down), Des Foley (Dublin), Jimmy Duggan (Galway), Willie Bryan (Offaly), Brian Mullins (Dublin), Bernard Brogan (Dublin), Jack O'Shea (Kerry), Sam Walsh (Kerry), Dermot Earley (Roscommon), Pádraig Dunne (Offaly), Jim Roynane (Dublin).

== The team ==
The team was published in the Sunday Independent on 19 August 1984.

Position	Player	County team	Club(s)	Team number	All-Ireland SFC, NFL and other honours
Goalkeeper	Dan O'Keeffe	Kerry	Kerins O'Rahilly's	1	All-Ireland SFC - 7 Munster SFC - 13; NFL- 1
Right corner-back	Enda Colleran	Galway	Mountbellew–Moylough	2	All-Ireland SFC - 3 Connacht SFC - 7 NFL- 1
Full-back	Paddy O'Brien	Meath	Skryne; Seán McDermotts (Dublin)	3	All-Ireland SFC - 2 Leinster SFC - 5 NFL- 2
Left corner-back	Seán Flanagan	Mayo	Ballaghaderreen	4	All-Ireland SFC - 2 Connacht SFC - 5 NFL- 2
Right wing-back	Seán Murphy	Kerry	Dingle	5	All-Ireland SFC – 3 Munster SFC - 7 NFL- 1
Centre-back	John Joe O’Reilly	Cavan	Cornafean	6	All-Ireland SFC - 2 Ulster SFC – 11; NFL- 1
Left wing-back	Stephen White	Louth	Cooley Kickhams; Mountbellew (Galway); Dundalk Young Irelands	7	All-Ireland SFC - 1 Leinster SFC - 4
Midfield	Mick O'Connell	Kerry	Valentia Young Islanders	8	All-Ireland SFC - 4 Munster SFC - 12; NFL- 4
Midfield	Jack O'Shea	Kerry	St Mary's (Kerry)	9	All-Ireland SFC – 7 Munster SFC – 10; NFL- 3
Right wing-forward	Seán O'Neill	Down	John Mitchels	10	All-Ireland SFC – 3 Ulster SFC - 8 NFL- 3
Centre-forward	Seán Purcell	Galway	Tuam Stars	11	All-Ireland SFC - 1 Connacht SFC - 7
Left wing-forward	Pat Spillane	Kerry	Templenoe	12	All-Ireland SFC - 8 Munster SFC - 11; NFL- 2
Right corner-forward	Mikey Sheehy	Kerry	Austin Stacks	13	All-Ireland SFC - 8 Munster SFC – 11; NFL- 3
Full-forward	Tom Langan	Mayo	Ballycastle	14	All-Ireland SFC - 2 Connacht SFC – 3
Left corner-forward	Kevin Heffernan	Dublin	St Vincents	15	All-Ireland SFC - 1 Leinster SFC - 4
