= Val Gannon =

Cavan Gaelic footballer

Personal information
- Native name: Vail Mag Fhionnáin (Irish)
- Born: 2 April 1919 Ballina, County Mayo, Ireland
- Died: 6 August 1986 (aged 67) Lisdarn, Cavan, Ireland
- Occupation: Lorry driver
- Height: 5 ft 7 in (170 cm)

Sport
- Sport: Gaelic football
- Position: Goalkeeper
Club
- Years: Club
- Mullahoran
Club titles
- Cavan titles: 6
Inter-county
- Years: County
- 1947–1948: Cavan
Inter-county titles
- Ulster titles: 2
- All-Irelands: 2
- NFL: 1

Martin Valentine Gannon (2 April 1919 – 6 August 1986) was an Irish Gaelic footballer and coach who played for club side Mullahoran and at senior level for the Cavan county team.

== Career ==
Gannon was described in his obituary as a goalkeeper of "exceptional ability". He first played with the Mullahoran club, winning a Cavan JFC title in 1940. He later won six Cavan SFC titles between 1942 and 1950. Gannon made his first appearance for the Cavan senior football team in the 1947 Ulster Championship. He ended the season by winning an All-Ireland Championship title after playing in goal in the 1947 All-Ireland final defeat of Kerry. Gannon won a second All-Ireland medal, albeit as a non-playing substitute, after a defeat of Mayo in the 1948 All-Ireland final. His other honours include two Ulster Championship medals and a National League title.

== Personal life and death ==
Born in Ballina, County Mayo, Gannon was just four-years-old when his family moved to Mullahoran, County Cavan where his father worked as a railway stationmaster. Gannon later worked with CIÉ but left to work as a lorry driver.

Gannon died at St Joseph's Hospital in Cavan on 8 August 1986.

== Honours ==
Mullahoran

- Cavan Senior Football Championship: 1942, 1944, 1945, 1947, 1948, 1950
- Cavan Junior Football Championship: 1940

Cavan

- All-Ireland Senior Football Championship: 1947, 1948
- Ulster Senior Football Championship: 1947, 1945, 1948
- National Football League: 1947–48
