= Seán Murphy (Gaelic footballer) =

Kerry Gaelic footballer (1932–2025)

Personal information
- Native name: Seán Ó Murchú (Irish)
- Born: 3 January 1932 Camp, County Kerry, Ireland
- Died: 14 April 2025 (aged 93) Tralee, County Kerry, Ireland
- Occupation: Doctor
- Height: 5 ft 11 in (180 cm)

Sport
- Sport: Gaelic football
- Position: Right wing-back
Clubs
- Years: Club
- Macroom; Glenflesk; Geraldines; Castlegregory; Dingle → West Kerry
Club titles
- Kerry titles: 0
College
- Years: College
- University College Dublin
College titles
- Sigerson titles: 3
Inter-county
Years	County	Apps (scores)
1949–1961	Kerry	28 (0–00)
Inter-county titles
- Munster titles: 8
- All-Irelands: 3
- NFL: 2

Seán Murphy (3 January 1932 – 14 April 2025) was an Irish Gaelic footballer. At club level, he played with Dingle and West Kerry, and at inter-county level with the Kerry senior football team.

== Career ==
Born in Camp, County Kerry, Murphy played Gaelic football as a student at Tralee CBS and won a Foley Cup title in 1944. He completed his schooling at Coláiste Íosagáin in Ballyvourney and won a Corn Uí Mhuirí medal in 1949, on a team captained by his brother Pádraig. Murphy later lined out with University College Dublin and won three successive Sigerson Cup medals.

Murphy lined out with several clubs in three different counties. He won a Cork MFC medal with Macroom and an East Kerry SFL medal with Glenflesk in 1949. Murphy also played with the Geraldines and Erin's Hope clubs in Dublin. He ended his club career playing with Dingle and divisional side West Kerry.

At inter-county level, Murphy first played for Kerry as a member of the minor team in 1949. His performances in that grade resulted in an immediate call-up to the junior team and he was at midfield when Kerry beat Lancashire to claim the All-Ireland JFC title. Murphy was again eligible for the minor grade in 1950 and won an All-Ireland MFC medal after a 3-06 to 1-04 defeat of Wexford in the final.

Murphy was just 17-years-old when he joined the senior team as a substitute in 1949. He later became a regular member of the team and won eight Munster SFC medals in a 10-year period between 1951 and 1961. Murphy also claimed All-Ireland SFC victories in 1953, 1955 and in 1959 when he was named man of the match. His performances throughout the 1959 season also earned him the Footballer of the Year award.

Other honours for Murphy include two National League titles. He also lined out for the Combined Universitates team and the Munster inter-provincial team, but ended his career without a Railway Cup success.

== Personal life and death ==
Murphy's brothers, Tom and Pádraig, were contemporaries for the All-Ireland JFC and All-Ireland MFC wins in 1949 and 1950. His other brother, Séamus, won four All-Ireland SFC medals. Murphy initially worked as a primary school teacher before qualifying as a doctor in 1964 and basing himself in Tralee. He was named on the GAA's Football Team of the Century (1984) and Football Team of the Millennium (1999).

Murphy died on 14 April 2025, at the age of 93.

== Honours ==
Tralee CBS

- Foley Cup: 1944

Coláiste Íosagáin

- Corn Uí Mhuirí: 1949

University College Dublin

- Sigerson Cup: 1956, 1957, 1958

Macroom

- Cork Minor Football Championship: 1949

Glenflesk

- East Kerry Senior Football League: 1949

Kerry

- All-Ireland Senior Football Championship: 1953, 1955, 1959
- Munster Senior Football Championship: 1951, 1953, 1954, 1955, 1958, 1959, 1960, 1961
- National Football League: 1958–59, 1960–61
- All-Ireland Junior Football Championship: 1949
- Munster Junior Football Championship: 1949
- All-Ireland Minor Football Championship: 1950
- Munster Minor Football Championship: 1949, 1950

== See also ==
- List of people on the postage stamps of Ireland
