= Batt Garvey =

Irish Gaelic footballer

Personal information
- Native name: Parthalán Ó Gairbhith (Irish)
- Nickname: Batt
- Born: 17 July 1921 Ventry, County Kerry, Ireland
- Died: 12 December 2002 Eccles Street, Dublin, Ireland
- Occupation: Primary school principal
- Height: 5 ft 9 in (175 cm)

Sport
- Sport: Gaelic football
- Position: Left wing-forward
Clubs
- Years: Club
- Dingle; Geraldines
Inter-county
Years	County	Apps (scores)
1945-1950	Kerry	29 (6-22)
Inter-county titles
- Munster titles: 4
- All-Irelands: 1
- NFL: 0

Bartholomew Garvey (17 July 1921 – 12 December 2002), known as Batt Garvey, was an Irish Gaelic footballer who played for club sides Dingle and Geraldines and at inter-county level with the Kerry senior football team.

== Career ==
Garvey first played Gaelic football with Dingle before lining out with the Geraldines club in Dublin. He made his first appearance at inter-county level with Kerry during the 1945 Munster Championship. Garvey won four Munster Championship medals in total, however, the highlight of his brief inter-county career was the 1946 All-Ireland final replay defeat of Roscommon. He also lined out in the 1947 All-Ireland final defeat by Cavan at the Polo Grounds in New York. Garvey also won two Railway Cup medals with Munster, the second as team captain.

== Personal life and death ==
Garvey was born in Ventry, County Kerry, but spent his entire adult life in Dublin where he was principal of St Joseph's Boys' National School in Terenure. He died on 12 December 2002 at the Mater Private Hospital.

== Honours ==
Kerry

- All-Ireland Senior Football Championship: 1946
- Munster Senior Football Championship: 1946, 1947, 1948, 1950

Munster

- Railway Cup: 1948, 1949 (c)
