= GAA Football Team of the Millennium =

The GAA Football Team of the Millennium was a team chosen in 1999 by a panel of GAA past presidents and journalists. The goal was to single out the best ever 15 players who had played the game in their respective positions, since the foundation of the GAA in 1884 up to the Millennium year, 2000. Naturally many of the selections were hotly debated by fans around the country. On 11 February 2013, the GAA opened the new Hall of Fame section in the Croke Park museum. All members of the football team of the Millennium were inducted into the hall of fame.

	Goalkeeper
	Dan O'Keeffe (Kerry)
Right corner back	Full back	Left corner back
Enda Colleran (Galway)	Joe Keohane (Kerry)	Seán Flanagan (Mayo)
Right half back	Centre back	Left half back
Seán Murphy (Kerry)	John Joe O'Reilly (Cavan)	Martin O'Connell (Meath)
	Midfield
Mick O'Connell (Kerry)		Tommy Murphy (Laois)
Right half forward	Centre forward	Left half forward
Seán O'Neill (Down)	Seán Purcell (Galway)	Pat Spillane (Kerry)
Right corner forward	Full forward	Left corner forward
Mikey Sheehy (Kerry)	Tommy Langan (Mayo)	Kevin Heffernan (Dublin)
