= Jimmy Stafford (Gaelic footballer) =

Cavan Gaelic footballer (1943–2021)

Personal information
- Native name: Séamus Stafort (Irish)
- Born: 1943 Killinkere, County Cavan, Ireland
- Died: 16 March 2021 (aged 77) Bailieborough, County Cavan, Ireland
- Occupation: Teagasc area manager

Sport
- Sport: Gaelic football
- Position: Right wing-back
Club
- Years: Club
- Killinkere
Club titles
- Cavan titles: 0
College
- Years: College
- University College Dublin
College titles
- Sigerson titles: 1
Inter-county
- Years: County
- 1962–1973: Cavan
Inter-county titles
- Ulster titles: 2
- All-Irelands: 0
- NFL: 0
- All Stars: 0

James J. Stafford (1943 – 16 March 2021) was an Irish Gaelic footballer who played as a full-back for club side Killinkere and was a member of the Cavan senior football team at various times from 1962 until 1973.

== Career ==
Stafford was born in Killinkere, County Cavan and was a nephew of All-Ireland-winner Joe Stafford. He learned a lot of his Gaelic football as a student at St. Patrick's College where he won back-to-back MacRory Cup titles. Stafford first appeared on the inter-county scene with the Cavan minor team in 1961, before winning an Ulster Junior Championship medal the following year. This success earned a call-up to the senior side which also claimed the provincial title. He claimed a second Ulster Senior Championship medal in 1964, however, emigration meant that he missed out on the successes of 1967 and 1969. Stafford enjoyed further successes in the twilight of his career, winning a County Junior Championship medal with Killinkere in 1972, as well as a Sigerson Cup medal with University College Dublin and a Railway Cup medal with the Combined Universities in 1973.

== Honours ==
St Patrick's College

- MacRory Cup: 1961, 1962

University College Dublin

- Sigerson Cup: 1973

Killinkere

- Cavan Junior Football Championship: 1972

Cavan

- Ulster Senior Football Championship: 1962, 1964
- Ulster Junior Football Championship: 1962

Combined Universities

- Railway Cup: 1973
