= McDyer =

McDyer is a surname. Notable people with the surname include:

- Brendan McDyer (born 1986/87), Irish Gaelic footballer
- Columba McDyer (1921–2001), Irish Gaelic footballer
- James McDyer (1910–1987), Irish Roman Catholic priest and activist
