= 1947–48 National Football League (Ireland) =

Gaelic football competition

League details
- Dates: November 1947 – 24 October 1948

League champions
- Winners: Cavan (1st win)
- Captain: John Joe O'Reilly

League runners-up
- Runners-up: Cork

The 1947–48 National Football League was the 17th staging of the National Football League, an annual Gaelic football tournament for the Gaelic Athletic Association county teams of Ireland.

At one game in Tralee on 9 November 1947, Mayo managed to hold Kerry to a draw despite having to draft in the county secretary and a car driver in as substitutes. The players drafted an official letter of complaint to the County Board.

Cavan won their first and, so far, only league title, winning the replay by 10 points.

== Format ==
=== Divisions ===
There were four Sections or Divisions. Division winners played off for the NFL title. Teams were placed in the divisions along geographical lines:

- Division One: Western
- Division Two: Eastern
- Division Three: Southern
- Division Four: Northern. The Northern Division doubled as the Dr Lagan Cup. The winners qualified for the semi-finals.

=== Round-robin format ===
Each team played every other team in its division (or group where the division is split) once, either home or away.

=== Points awarded ===
2 points were awarded for a win and 1 for a draw.

=== Titles ===
Teams in all three divisions competed for the National Football League title.

=== Separation of teams on equal points ===
In the event that teams finish on equal points, then a play-off will be used to determine group placings if necessary.

=== Promotion and relegation ===
None. All four Divisions had equal status.

== Group stage ==
=== Division One ===
==== Group A Results ====
9 November 1947 Round 1	Kerry	1-7 — 1-7	Mayo	Austin Stack Park, Tralee

23 November 1947 Round 2	Mayo	1-4 — 0-3	Galway	McHale Park, Castlebar

7 December 1947 Round 3	Galway	1-5 — 3-6	Kerry	Galway

15 February 1948 Play-Off	Kerry	3-6 — 2-6	Mayo	Croke Park, Dublin

==== Group B Results ====
9 November 1947 Round 1	Sligo	2-7 — 2-6	Roscommon	Sligo

7 December 1947 Round 3	Leitrim	1-4 — 2-5	Sligo	Carrick-on-Shannon

==== Division Final ====
11 April 1948	Sligo	2-4 — 3-7	Kerry	Sligo Show Grounds, Sligo

==== Tables ====
===== Group A =====
Team	Pld	W	D	L	Pts	Status
Kerry	2	1	1	0	3	Qualified for knockout phase
Mayo	2	1	1	0	3
Galway	2	0	0	2	0

===== Group B =====
Team	Pld	W	D	L	Pts	Status
Sligo	2	2	0	0	4
Roscommon	2	0	1	0	1
Leitrim	2	0	1	0	1

=== Division Two ===
==== Group A ====
9 November 1947 Round 1	Westmeath	1-5 — 3-3	Meath	Athlone

23 November 1947 Round 2	Meath	3-5 — 4-6	Cavan	Navan

7 December 1947 Round 1	Cavan	7-5 — 1-1	Westmeath	Breffni Park, Cavan

==== Group B ====
9 November 1947 Round 1	Louth	2-4 — 1-9	Longford	Dundalk

23 November 1947 Round 2	Longford	1-6 — 3-5	Dublin	Pearse Park, Longford

7 December 1947 Round 3	Dublin	2-9 — 4-3	Louth	Croke Park, Dublin

==== Division Final ====
21 March 1948	Cavan	3-17 — 2-4	Dublin	Croke Park, Dublin

==== Tables ====
===== Group A =====
Team	Pld	W	D	L	Pts	Status
Cavan	2	2	0	0	4	Qualified for knockout phase
Meath	2	1	0	0	2
Westmeath	2	0	0	2	0

===== Group B =====
Team	Pld	W	D	L	Pts	Status
Dublin	2	1	1	0	3
Longford	2	1	0	1	2
Louth	2	0	1	0	1

=== Division Three ===
==== Group A Results ====
9 November 1947 Round 1	Tipperary	2-6 — 4-9	Limerick	Clonmel

23 November 1947 Round 2	Limerick	2-1 — 1-8	Clare	Limerick

7 December 1947 Round 3	Clare	1-6 — 1-6	Tipperary	Ennis

==== Group B Results ====
9 November 1947 Round 1	Wicklow	1-6 — 1-9	Wexford	Carnew

23 November 1947 Round 2	Wexford	11-4 — 2-4	Carlow	Gorey

==== Group C Results ====
9 November 1947 Round 1	Kildare	5-7 — 0-2	Offaly	Kildare

23 November 1947 Round 2	Offaly	2-7 — 3-5	Cork	O'Connor Park, Tullamore

7 December 1947 Round 3	Kildare	1-4 — 3-3	Cork	Naas

==== Division play-offs ====
29 February 1948 Semi-final	Clare	1-8 — 1-5	Wexford	Enniscorthy

21 March 1948 Final	Cork	W — L	Clare	Ennis

==== Tables ====
===== Group A =====
Team	Pld	W	D	L	Pts	Status
Clare	2	1	1	0	3
Limerick	2	1	0	0	2
Tipperary	2	0	1	0	1

===== Group B =====
Team	Pld	W	D	L	Pts	Status
Wexford	2	2	0	0	4
Wicklow	2	1	0	0	2
Carlow	2	0	0	1	0

===== Group C =====
Team	Pld	W	D	L	Pts	Status
Cork	3	3	0	0	6
Kildare	3	2	0	1	4
Laois	2	0	2	0	0
Offaly	2	0	2	0	0

- The Laois v Offaly fixture was not fulfilled.

=== Division Four (Dr Lagan Cup) ===
23 November 1947 Final	Antrim	2-4 — 1-3	Donegal	Lurgan

== Knockout phase ==
=== Semi-final ===
9 May 1948

Cavan	2-9 – 2-7	Kerry

Croke Park, Dublin

16 May 1948

Cork	3-5 – 1-10	Antrim

Croke Park, Dublin

=== Final ===
20 June 1948
Final

Cavan	2-11 – 3-8	Cork

Croke Park, Dublin
Attendance: 25,367
Referee: John Dowling (Kildare)

24 October 1948
Final Replay

Cavan	5-9 – 2-8	Cork

Croke Park, Dublin
Attendance: 26,567
Referee: Martin O'Neill (Wexford)
