= John McKnight (Gaelic footballer) =

Armagh Gaelic footballer

Personal information
- Native name: Seán Mac Neachtain (Irish)
- Born: 1932 Killeavy, County Armagh, Northern Ireland
- Died: 9 July 2017 (aged 84) Howth, County Dublin, Republic of Ireland
- Occupation: Solicitor
- Height: 5 ft 10 in (178 cm)

Sport
- Sport: Gaelic football
- Position: Left corner-back
Clubs
- Years: Club
- Killeavy; University College Dublin; Aodh Ruadh; Belturbet Rory O'Moore's
College
- Years: College
- 1949–1956: University College Dublin
College titles
- Sigerson titles: 2
Inter-county
- Years: County
- 1953–1959: Armagh
Inter-county titles
- Ulster titles: 1
- All-Irelands: 0
- NFL: 0

John McKnight (1932 – 9 July 2017) was a Gaelic footballer whose league and championship career at senior level with the Armagh county team lasted seven seasons from 1953 to 1959.

Born in Killeavy, County Armagh, McKnight was raised in a family that had no immediate link with Gaelic games. He first played Gaelic football with Ballybot in the Newry Street League competitions. McKnight and his three brothers would, in time, all line out for Armagh.

McKnight played competitive Gaelic football during his schooldays at Abbey CBS Grammar School. Here he won a Rannafast Cup medal. During his studies at University College Dublin he won Sigerson Cup medals in 1954 and 1956.

After graduating in law in 1956, McKnight moved to Ballyshannon where he played Gaelic football with the Aodh Ruadh club. The following year he transferred his legal and football talents to Belturbet in Cavan, but in 1959 returned to Dublin.

McKnight made his debut on the inter-county scene when he was selected for the Armagh minor team. He enjoyed two championship seasons with the minor team, culminating with the winning of an All-Ireland medal in 1949. McKnight subsequently joined the Armagh junior team, winning an Ulster medal in 1951, before making his senior debut during the 1953 championship. He won an Ulster medal in his debut season, however, he ended the year as an All-Ireland runner-up. McKnight also won three successive Dr Lagan Cup medals before his career ended in 1959.

Throughout his inter-county career, McKnight was a regular member of the Ulster inter-provincial team. He won his sole Railway Cup medal in 1956.

In retirement, McKnight was named in his customary left corner-back position in a Football Team of the Century composed of non-All-Ireland winners in 1984.

McKnight and his business partner, friend and former Fermanagh Gaelic footballer Gerry Charlton, founded the firm of solicitors Reddy Charlton McKnight in 1964. McKnight acted as solicitor to the GAA for decades until his retirement as a solicitor, guiding the Association through a number of legal issues, including the redevelopment of Croke Park.

McKnight died on 9 July 2017.

== Honours ==
University College Dublin

- Sigerson Cup (2): 1954, 1956

Armagh

- Ulster Senior Football Championship (1): 1953
- Dr Lagan Cup (3): 1954, 1955, 1956
- All-Ireland Minor Football Championship (1): 1949
- Ulster Minor Football Championship (1): 1949

Ulster

- Railway Cup (1): 1956
