= 1950 All-Ireland Minor Football Championship =

Gaelic football competition

All-Ireland Champions
- Winning team: Kerry (5th win)

All-Ireland Finalists
- Losing team: Wexford

Provincial Champions
- Munster: Kerry
- Leinster: Wexford
- Ulster: Antrim
- Connacht: Mayo

The 1950 All-Ireland Minor Football Championship was the 19th staging of the All-Ireland Minor Football Championship, the Gaelic Athletic Association's premier inter-county Gaelic football tournament for boys under the age of 18.

Armagh entered the championship as defending champions, however, they were defeated by Antrim in the Ulster final.

On 24 September 1950, Kerry won the championship following a 3-6 to 1-4 defeat of Wexford in the All-Ireland final. This was their fifth All-Ireland title overall and their first in four championship seasons.

== Results ==
=== All-Ireland Minor Football Championship ===
Semi-finals

27 August 1950 Semi-final	Kerry	2-09 - 0-01	Antrim	Austin Stack Park, Tralee

27 August 1950 Semi-final	Wexford	2-07 - 1-08	Mayo	Wexford Park, Wexford

Final

24 September 1950 Final	Kerry	3-06 - 1-04	Wexford	Croke Park, Dublin
