= Séamus O'Malley =

Irish Gaelic footballer and Gaelic games administrator

Personal information
- Native name: Séamus Ó Máille (Irish)
- Born: James Malley; 28 December 1903 Ballinrobe, County Mayo, Ireland
- Died: July 2002 (aged 98) Claremorris, County Mayo, Ireland
- Occupation: National school teacher

Sport
- Sport: Gaelic football
- Position: Centre-back
Clubs
- Years: Club
- Ballinrobe; Castlebar Mitchels; Claremorris
College
- Years: College
- University College Galway
College titles
- Sigerson titles: 1
Inter-county
- Years: County
- 1930–1936: Mayo
Inter-county titles
- Connacht titles: 3
- All-Irelands: 1
- NFL: 3

Séamus O'Malley (28 December 1903 – July 2002) was an Irish Gaelic footballer and Gaelic games administrator. His league and championship career at senior level with the Mayo county team spanned six seasons from 1930 until 1936.

Born in Ballinrobe, County Mayo, O'Malley was the eldest son of Luke and Anne O'Malley (née Cunningham). He was educated locally and later attended University College Galway. During his studies here O'Malley won a Sigerson Cup medal in 1934.

After first playing competitive Gaelic football with the Ballinrobe club, O'Malley later played with Castlebar Mitchels before ending his club career with the Claremorris club.

O'Malley made his senior debut for Mayo during the 1930–31 league and quickly became a regular member of the starting fifteen. Over the course of the following six years he enjoyed much success, the highlight being in 1936 when he won an All-Ireland medal as captain of the team. O'Malley also won three Connacht medals and three National Football League medals.

Even during his playing days, O'Malley became involved in the administrative affairs of the Gaelic Athletic Association. He served as Secretary of the Mayo County Board during the 1930s.

O'Malley died in July 2002 at the age of 97. At the time he was the oldest-living All-Ireland medal winner. His son, Michael O'Malley, and his grandson, Niall Finnegan, also played with Mayo and Galway.

== Honours ==
University College Galway

- Sigerson Cup (1): 1934

Mayo

- All-Ireland Senior Football Championship (1): 1936 (c)
- Connacht Senior Football Championship (3): 1931, 1932, 1936 (c)
- National Football League (3): 1933–34, 1935–36, 1936–37

Sporting positions
Preceded by Gerard Courell	Mayo Senior Football Captain; 1936	Succeeded by Paddy Moclair
Achievements
Preceded by Hughie O'Reilly	All-Ireland Senior Football Final winning captain 1936	Succeeded by Miko Doyle
