= 1933 All-Ireland Senior Football Championship final =

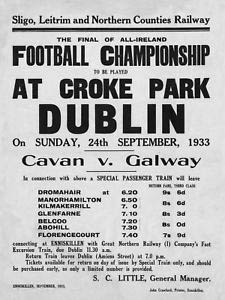
- Event: 1933 All-Ireland Senior Football Championship
| Cavan | Galway |
| 2–5 (11) | 2–4 (10) |
- Date: 24 September 1933
- Venue: Croke Park, Dublin
- Referee: Martin O'Neill (Wexford)
- Attendance: 45,188
- Weather: Rain

The 1933 All-Ireland Senior Football Championship final was the 46th All-Ireland Final and the deciding match of the 1933 All-Ireland Senior Football Championship, an inter-county Gaelic football tournament for the top teams in Ireland.

== Pre-match ==
Kerry were the reigning champions, having completed the second senior four-in-a-row in 1932, following the Wexford team of 1915–1918. However, Kerry did not qualify for the 1933 decider, having been knocked out of the competition at the semi-final stage.

== Match ==
This year's final was played on 24 September.

=== Summary ===
Cavan became the first Ulster county to win an All-Ireland SFC, with first-half goals by Louis Blessing, and "Son" Magee. A record crowd attended the game, with about 5,000 more locked out.

Galway may have lost, but they were regarded as a force for the future; this proved true as the following year they won their second All-Ireland SFC title and took the Sam Maguire Cup back to the west for the first time.

=== Details ===
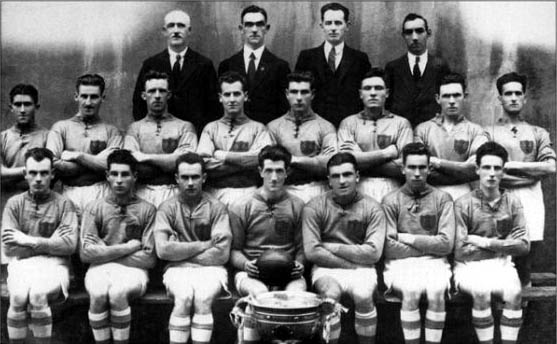
Cavan team, champions

| 24 September 1933; Final | Cavan | 2–5 – 2–4 | Galway | Croke Park, Dublin; Attendance: 45,188; Referee: Martin O'Neill (Wexford) |

Cavan
Galway

==== Cavan ====
- Louis Blessing
- Vincent McGovern
- Willie Connolly
- Willie Young
- Terry Coyle
- M. Denneny
- Tom O'Reilly
- Hughie O'Reilly
- Jack Smallhorn
- Donal Morgan
- Packie Phair
- Jim Smith (c)
- Patsy Lynch
- Patsy Devlin
- M.J. McGee

==== Galway ====
- Michael Donnellan (c)
- Frank Fox
- Brendan Nestor
- Michael Brennan
- Hugo Carey
- Mick Connaire
- John Dunne
- K. Kelleher
- Martin Kelly
- Tadhg McCarthy
- F. Burke
- Mick Higgins
- Dinny O'Sullivan
- Tommy Hughes
- Dermot Mitchell
