= 1947 All-Ireland Senior Football Championship =

Football championship

All-Ireland Champions
- Winning team: Cavan (3rd win)
- Captain: John Joe O’Reilly

All-Ireland Finalists
- Losing team: Kerry
- Captain: Dinny Lyne

Provincial Champions
- Munster: Kerry
- Leinster: Meath
- Ulster: Cavan
- Connacht: Roscommon

Championship statistics

The 1947 All-Ireland Senior Football Championship was the 61st staging of Ireland's premier Gaelic football knock-out competition.

The Munster final between Cork & Kerry became a start of common Cork-Kerry Munster finals until 1990 expect 4.

Cavan were the winners. All Ireland final in New York ending Kerry's All Ireland title.

== Results ==
=== Connacht Senior Football Championship ===
25 May 1947
Quarter-Final

Roscommon	1–10 – 0–4	Mayo
		S. Daly (0–2) & J. Munnelly (0–2).

James Stephens Park, Ballina

1 June 1947
Semi-Final

Sligo	2–6 – 1–6	Galway

St. Coman's Park, Roscommon

29 June 1947
Semi-Final

Roscommon	1–9 – 0–3	Leitrim

Carrick-on-Shannon

20 July 1947
Final

Roscommon	2–12 – 1–8	Sligo

James Stephens Park, Ballina
Attendance: 14,000

=== Leinster Senior Football Championship ===
11 May 1947
Round 1

Meath	5–7 – 2–3	Wicklow

St. Conleth's Park, Newbridge

18 May 1947
Round 1

Dublin	1–11 – 0–5	Longford
M Dolan 1–1, T Leahy, Pierce Thornton, M O'Reilly (0-1f) 0–3 each, C Manning 0–1		F Doris 0–2, J Duignan, J O'Brien, J Plunkett 0–1 each

Cusack Park, Mullingar

18 May 1947
Round 1

Kildare	2–8 – 1–9	Wexford
W.Geraghty 0–4, K.O'Donovan, P.White 1–1, D.Fox, R.Martin 0–1.

Dr. Cullen Park, Carlow

11 May 1947
Quarter-Final

Offaly	2–6 – 1–3	Carlow

O'Moore Park, Portlaoise

1 June 1947
Quarter-Final

Louth	3–11 – 1–9	Dublin

Páirc Tailteann, Navan

15 June 1947
Quarter-Final

Meath	1–8 – 0–5	Westmeath

Cusack Park, Mullingar

22 June 1947
Quarter-Final

Laois	2–7 – 1–8	Kildare
		D.Fox 1–1, M.Geraghty 0–3, P.White 0–2, W.Geraghty, T.O'Hanlon 0–1.

O'Connor Park, Tullamore

6 July 1947
Semi-Final

Offaly	0–4 – 5–11	Laois

O'Moore Park, Portlaoise
Attendance: 15,000
Referee: P Mythen (Laois)

6 July 1947
Semi-Final

Meath	0–9 – 1–4	Louth

Croke Park, Dublin

20 July 1947
Final

Meath	3–7 – 1–7	Laois
Peter McDermott 2–2, Brian Smyth 1–0, Victor Sherlock and Frankie Byrne (0-2f) 0–2 each, Mick O'Brien 0–1 each		Bill Delaney 1–2, Des Connolly (0-2f) and Paddy Peacock 0–2 each, Aiden O'Donnell 0-1f

Croke Park, Dublin
Attendance: 41,631
Referee: Paddy Mythen (Wexford)

=== Munster Senior Football Championship ===
1 June 1947
Quarter-Final

Tipperary	4–13 – 0–4	Waterford

Páirc Daibhín, Carrick on Suir
Referee: D. Ryan (Kerry)

8 June 1947
Quarter-Final

Clare	4–9 – 2–4	Limerick

Cusack Park, Ennis

6 July 1947
Semi-Final

Kerry	9–10 – 0–4	Clare
P. Kennedy (1–0), G. O'Sullivan (1–2), W. O'Donnell (1–0), B. Garvey (2–0), F. O'Keeffe (3–0), T. G. O'Connor (0–7) & D. Kavanagh (1–1).

Gaelic Grounds, Limerick

6 July 1947
Semi-Final

Cork	2–3 – 1–2	Tipperary
D. Cullinane (0–2), J. Lynch (0–1) & J. Cronin (1–0).

Páirc MacGearailt, Fermoy
Referee: D. O'Sullivan (W)

27 July 1947
Final

Kerry	3–8 – 2–6	Cork
T. O'Connor (0–1), G. O'Sullivan (1–0), W. O'Donnell (0–1), B. Garvey (0–1), F. O'Keeffe (1–0), T. G. O'Connor (0–3) & D. Kavanagh (1–2).		T. Crowley (0–1), C. McGrath (0–1), N. Duggan (0–1), J. Lynch (1–0) & J. Aherne (1–3).

Cork Athletic Grounds, Cork

=== Ulster Senior Football Championship ===
8 June 1947
Preliminary Round

Tyrone	0–7 – 1–4	Fermanagh

St. Molaise Park, Irvinestown

8 June 1947
Preliminary Round Replay

Tyrone	3–5 – 2–6	Fermanagh

Fr. Peter Campbell Park, Coalisland

15 June 1947
Quarter-Final

Down	2–11 – 2–5	Derry

The Playing Fields, Lurgan

15 June 1947
Quarter-Final

Cavan	0–9 – 1–6	Monaghan
M Higgins (0–3), Ed Carolan (0–2), T Tighe (0–2), Cassidy (0–2)		Finnegan (1–1), Murphy (0–2), O Rourke (0–1), Firzpatrick (0–1), Mc Donald (0–1)

Breffni Park, Cavan

22 June 1947
Quarter-Final Replay

Cavan	1–11 – 1–9	Monaghan

St. Tiernach's Park, Clones

22 June 1947
Quarter-Final

Armagh	1–6 – 1–6	Tyrone

Athletic Grounds, Armagh

29 June 1947
Quarter-Final Replay

Armagh	1–4 – 2–5	Tyrone

O'Neill Park, Dungannon
Attendance: 10,000

6 July 1947
Semi-Final

Antrim	3–13 – 1–7	Down

The Playing Fields, Lurgan
Attendance: 17,000

6 July 1947
Semi-Final

Cavan	4–5 – 0–2	Tyrone
J Stafford (1-02), P Donohoe (1-01), Ed Carolan (1–0), S Deignan (1–0), Cassidy (0–2)		I Jones (0–1), Devlin (0-01)

O'Neill Park, Dungannon

20 July 1947
Final

Cavan	3–4 – 1–6	Antrim
P Donohoe (1–2), Stafford (1–2), OG (1–0)		F Dunlop (1–0), J Mc Callin (0–1), K Armstrong (0–1), Mc Corry (0–2), Pa O Hara (0–1), S Gibson (0–1),

St. Tiernach's Park, Clones
Attendance: 34,000

=== All-Ireland Senior Football Championship ===
3 August 1947
Semi-Final

Cavan	2–4 – 0–6	Roscommon
P Donohoe (1–4), T Tighe (1–0)		O Rourke (0–4), Mc Quillan (0–1), Nerney (0–1)

Croke Park, Dublin
Attendance: 60,075

10 August 1947
Semi-Final

Kerry	1–11 – 0–5	Meath
Gerald O'Sullivan (0–2), Willie O'Donnell (1–1), Batt Garvey (0–3), Tom Gega O'Connor (0–2), Dan Kavanagh (0–1) & Sub: Eddie Dowling (0–1).

Croke Park, Dublin
Attendance: 65,939

14 September 1947
Final

Cavan	2–11 – 2–7	Kerry
P Donohoe (0–8), M Higgins (1–1), T P O Reilly (1–1), C Mc Dyer (0–1),		Eddie Dowling (1–0), Batt Garvey (1–0), Tom Gega O'Connor (0–6) & Paddy Kennedy (0–1).

Polo Grounds, New York City
Attendance: 34,491
Referee: M O'Neill (Wexford)

== Championship statistics ==
=== Miscellaneous ===
- The Dungannon Fields are named O'Neill Park after Hugh O'Neill.
- The All Ireland final, Cavan vs Kerry was played in New York City, in the United States of America, the last time played outside Croke Park, Dublin and only played outside Ireland.
- Kerry goalkeeper Dan O'Keeffe is the first Gaelic Football player attempting to win a record-breaking 8th All-Ireland winners medal on the field of play, only to have lost to Cavan in the championship final.
