= P. J. Duke (gaelic footballer) =

Cavan Gaelic footballer

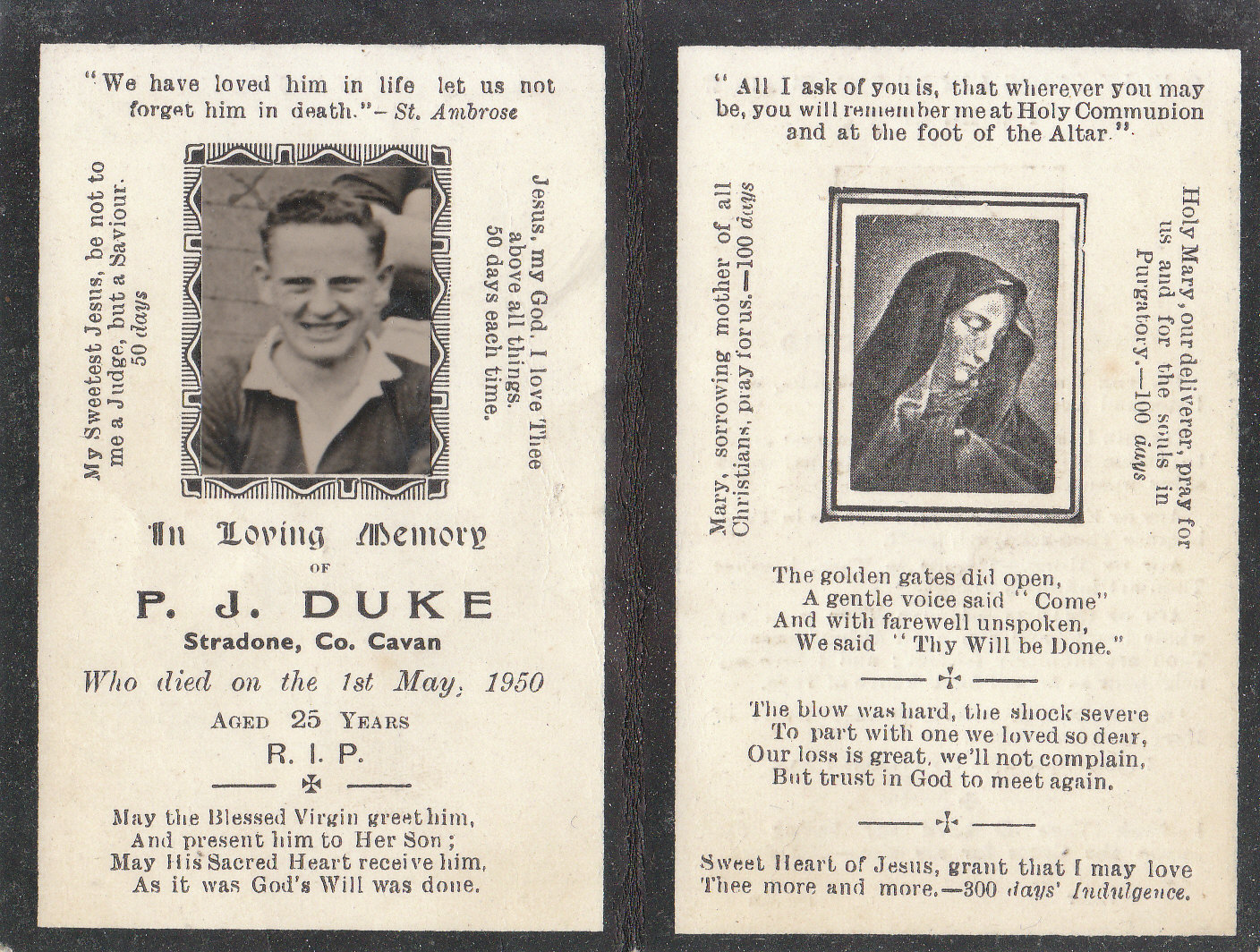

Personal information
- Native name: Pilib Diúc (Irish)
- Born: Stradone, County Cavan, Ireland
- Occupation: Dentist

Sport
- Sport: Gaelic football
- Position: Midfield, Half back, Full forward
Club
- Years: Club
- Stradone
Inter-county
- Years: County
- 1945–1950: Cavan
Inter-county titles
- Ulster titles: 6
- All-Irelands: 2
- NFL: 1
- All Stars: 0

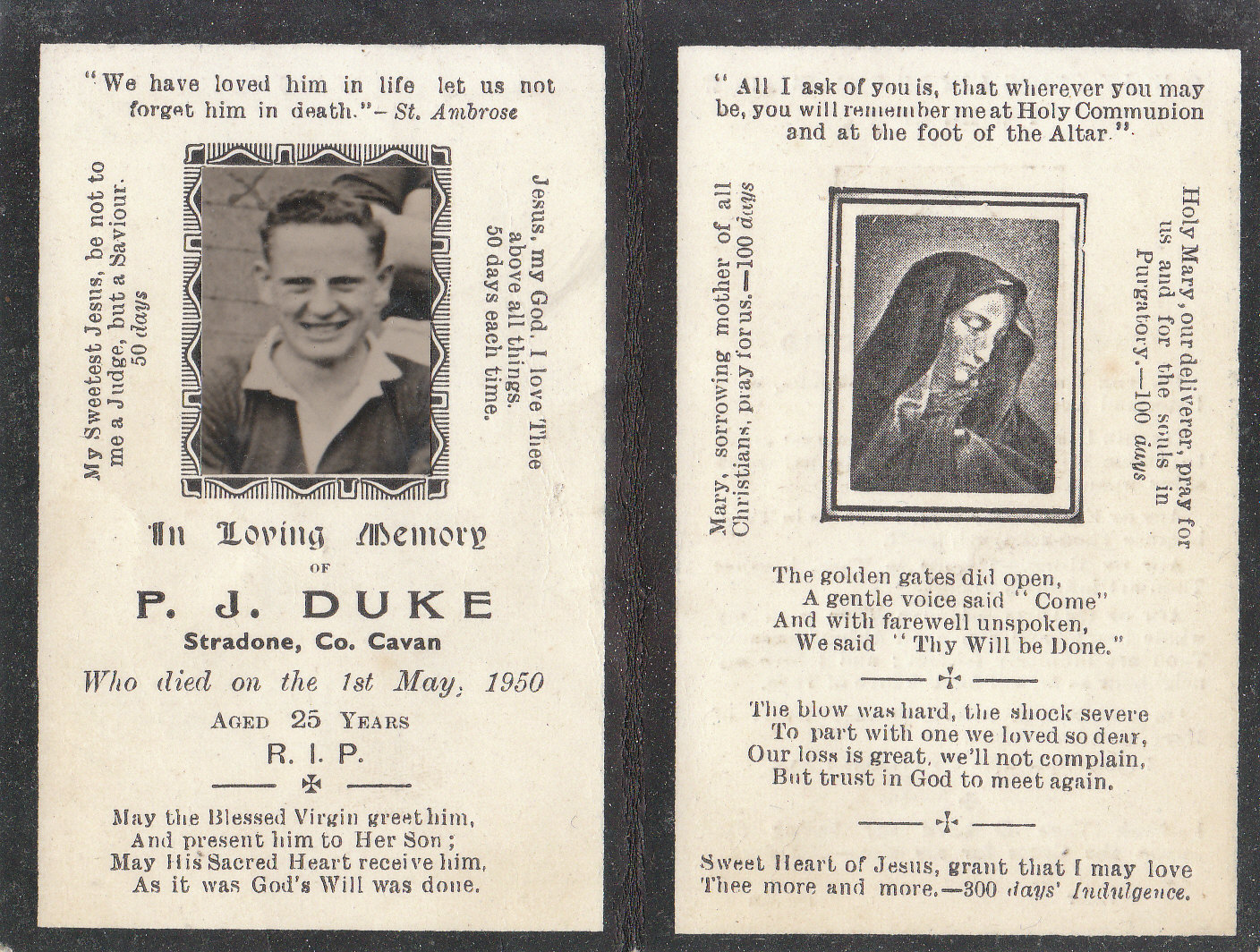
P.J. Duke memorial mass card

Philip Joseph Duke (1925–1950) was a Gaelic footballer who played for the Cavan county team.

== Playing career ==
As a footballer, Duke could play as a half-back, midfielder or as a forward. Cavan's historic win over Kerry in the 1947 All-Ireland Senior Football Championship final played at the Polo Grounds in New York was arguably P.J. Duke's greatest ever hour. Cavan found themselves eight points down against Kerry. Team-manager Hughie O'Reilly switched Duke from midfield to right half-back to mark Batt Garvey who had threatened to win the game on his own. The switch saw an immediate tightening up of the Cavan defence and this changed the pattern of the game with Duke making several runs out of defence, and the inter-passing speed and skills of Mick Higgins and Tony Tighe. He again formed a half-back partnership with Simon Deignan and J. J. O'Reilly to reclaim the title in 1948. He won a National Football League medal in 1949 and he collected a Railway Cup medal with Ulster in 1950. He won three Sigerson Cup medals with University College Dublin.

== Death ==
Duke died, while still a young man, on 1 May 1950 after a short illness at St Vincent's Hospital in Dublin. He was just 25 years old.

== Other honours ==
- Number 124 in the "125 greatest stars of the GAA"
- Selected at right half back in Cavan's "Team of the Millennium" in December 2000
- Picked for the Combined Universities team against Rest of Ireland selections in 1949
