= Tommy Langan =

Irish Gaelic footballer

Personal information
- Born: 23 September 1921 Castlebar, County Mayo, Ireland
- Died: 22 September 1974 (aged 52) Ballina, County Mayo, Ireland
- Occupation: Garda Síochána
- Height: 5 ft 11 in (180 cm)

Sport
- Sport: Gaelic football
- Position: Full-forward
Club
- Years: Club
- 1939–: Ballycastle
Club titles
- Mayo titles: 1
Inter-county
Years	County	Apps (scores)
1943–1956	Mayo	31 (12–21)
Inter-county titles
- Connacht titles: 5
- All-Irelands: 2
- NFL: 2

Thomas Langan (23 September 1921 – 22 September 1974) was an Irish Gaelic footballer who played as a centre-forward and as a full-forward for the senior Mayo county team. He was selected as a full-forward on the Football Team of the Millennium as 1999.

Langan joined the team during the 1943 championship and was a regular member of the starting fifteen until his retirement following the conclusion of the 1956 championship. During that time he won two All-Ireland medals, five Connacht medals and two National League medals.

== Playing career ==
Langan was born in Ballymachugh, Ballycastle, County Mayo. Despite his youth, Langan helped Ballycastle to win the Mayo senior championship of 1937. In 1938, he made his first appearance for Mayo's minor team in the All-Ireland Minor Football Championship. Five years later, he made his senior debut, playing as a centre-half-forward.

Langan was at his best during Mayo's golden period from 1948 to 1955, as they won five Connacht Senior Football Championships and two All-Irelands. Langan's first All-Ireland Final was in 1948, but a strong Cavan team beat Mayo by one point. In 1950, Langan was selected at full-forward for the first time in the All-Ireland semi-final against Armagh. He scored two goals in a Mayo win. Mayo also won the final against Louth, and Langan had his first All-Ireland medal. From then on, he won fame as one of the greatest full-forwards in football history.

Langan's fielding and goals were again crucial in 1951. Mayo won the Connacht championship for the fourth successive time and advanced to the All-Ireland semi-final against Kerry. With Mayo behind in injury time, Langan was switched to full-forward against the great Kerry full-back Paddy Bawn Brosnan. He scored a vital goal and Mayo went on to force a replay, which they won. They completed their second consecutive All-Ireland title by beating Meath by five points in the final, with Langan netting another fine goal.

Langan also represented Connacht in the Railway Cup, earning a winner's medal against Munster in the 1951 Final.

Langan's last appearance in county football was against Galway in the Connacht Championship of 1956. He retired following Galway's victory in that game.

== Post-Retirement ==
Tom Langan was a Garda detective in Dublin at the time of his death in 1974, on the eve of his 53rd birthday. In 1984, the Gaelic Athletic Association centenary year, he was honoured by being named on their Football Team of the Century. In 1999 he was again honoured by the GAA by being named on their Gaelic Football Team of the Millennium. On 16 September 1984, Tom Langan Park was officially opened by Dr Mick Loftus, then President-elect of the G.A.A. It remains the home ground of the local Ballycastle club.
