= Mick O'Hanlon =

Irish hurler and Gaelic footballer

Michael O'Hanlon (7 July 1920 – 21 November 1996) was an Irish hurler and Gaelic footballer. A member of the Horeswood club, he won All-Ireland medals with Wexford in 1955 and 1956. O'Hanlon's grandson, Matthew O'Hanlon, currently plays for Wexford.
