= Cavan GAA =

County board of the Gaelic Athletic Association in Ireland

- Irish: An Cabhán
- Nickname(s): The Breifne County
- Province: Ulster
- Dominant sport: Gaelic football
- Ground(s): Breffni Park
- County colours: Blue White
- Website: cavangaa.ie

Clubs
- SFC champions: Kingscourt Stars
- SFC year: 2025
- SHC champions: Cootehill Celtic
- SHC year: 2025

County teams
- NFL: Division 2
- NHL: Division 4
- Football Championship: Sam Maguire Cup
- Hurling Championship: Lory Meagher Cup
- Ladies' Gaelic football: Brendan Martin Cup
- Camogie: Nancy Murray Cup

The Cavan County Board (Irish: Cumann Lúthchleas Gael Coiste Chontae an Chabháin) or Cavan GAA is one of the 32 county boards of the Gaelic Athletic Association (GAA) in Ireland, and is responsible for the administration of Gaelic games in County Cavan.

The County Board is responsible for preparing the Cavan county teams in the various Gaelic sporting codes; football, hurling, camogie and handball.

The county football team won 5 All-Ireland Senior Football Championships before going into decline after 1970. The team won its 39th and 40th Ulster Senior Football Championships after gaps of 28 and 23 years, in 1997 and 2020 respectively.

== Governance ==
Cavan GAA has jurisdiction over the area that is associated with the traditional county of County Cavan. There are 8 officers on the Board. For details on the Board's clubs, see Gaelic Athletic Association clubs in County Cavan and List of Gaelic games clubs in Ireland#Cavan. The Board is subject to the Ulster GAA Provincial Council.

=== Crest and symbols ===
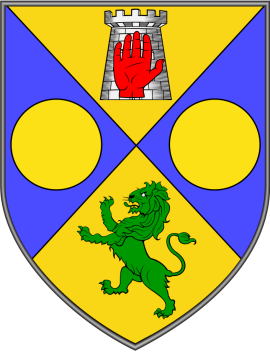
Coat of arms of County Cavan

The first crest that adorned the Cavan jerseys was the coat of arms for County Cavan. The crest was split into four quadrants and included:

- the red hand of Ulster encased in an outline of the Franciscan Abbey which is situated in Cavan town and where the O'Reilly chieftains are buried. Here also lie the remains of an Ulster leader, Eoghan Rua O'Neill.
- The Rampant Lion from the coat of arms of the O’Reilly clans, who were the local lords.

In 2004 Cavan released a new crest for Breifne County. The crest was designed by the 38th President of the Gaelic Athletic Association Aogán Farrell and Cavan Central Council rep. George Cartwright. The crest draws on cultural, physical and historical influences. The primary colours are blue and white with Ulster's red hand and G.A.A. yellow also prominent. The designers wanted to reflect the following elements

- Breifne: The ancient Gaelic territory. Modern Cavan was once "O Reilly country" and the ancient Gaelic kingdom of Breifne is preserved in the name of the home pitch in Cavan and now on its crest
- Franciscan Abbey: The mediaeval tower from the Abbey in Cavan Town fills the lower quadrant. Here the O'Reillys invited the Franciscans to establish a monastery. The O'Reilly chieftains are buried here. Here also lie the remains of Ulster's great leader, Eoghan Rua O'Neill
- GAA Logo: The GAA modern logo fills the right quadrant. The logo is representative of the Gaelic Athletic Association.
- Red Hand 1886: The first GAA club founded in the province of Ulster was formed in Cavan. Ballyconnell First Ulsters formed in 1885 and affiliated in 1886. The date is preserved in the crest. A red hand has always appeared on Cavan crests.
- Lakes and Hills: Our landscape is dominated by "wee lakes and hills". The environment shapes us and this is reflected on the new crest.

== Football ==
=== Clubs ===
The first GAA club in Cavan and in Ulster was founded in Ballyconnell in late 1885 called Ballyconnell Joe Biggars in honour of west Cavan Nationalist MP Joe Biggar. The name of the club was later changed to Ballyconnell First Ulsters.

The first Cavan County Final, under GAA rules was played in a field outside Cavan Town on 30 April 1887. The final was contested by Ballyconnell First Ulster's and Maghera MacFinns. MacFinns recorded a famous victory on a score line of 1–4 to First Ulster's 0-1, thus entering the history books as Cavan's first Champions.

The Cavan Senior Football Championship is an annual club competition between the top Cavan clubs. The winners of the Cavan Championship qualify to represent their county in the Ulster Senior Championship and in turn, go on to the All-Ireland Senior Club Football Championship. The current champions are Gowna who defeated Kingscourt Stars in the 2023 final. The first winners of the Cavan football championship were Maghera MacFinns in 1887, who beat Ballyconnell First Ulsters 1–04 to 0-01. Cornafean are the most successful senior team winning on twenty occasions.

The Cavan Intermediate Football Championship is the second-tier football championship. The Intermediate champions go on to play in the Ulster Intermediate Championship, and are promoted to Senior for the next year. The 2023 champions are Ballyhaise who became champions with a win over Denn. Lacken are the most successful intermediate club, having won on four occasions.

The Cavan Junior Football Championship is the third-tier football championship. The Junior champions go on to play in the Ulster Junior Championship, and are promoted to Intermediate for the next year. The 2023 champions are Arva who beat Knockbride in the decider. Arva also went on to win the Ulster Junior Club Championship and in turn, the All-Ireland Junior Club Football Championship for 2023. Templeport are the most successful Junior team, having won the Cavan title seven times.

Clubs (40 as of 2020) range from Shannon Gaels in the far north-west to Kingscourt in the south-east.

=== County team ===
Cavan is the most successful football county in the province of Ulster, having won the All-Ireland Senior Football Championship (SFC) five times, the Ulster Senior Football Championship (SFC) 40 times, and the National Football League once.

In the 1933 All-Ireland SFC semi-final in Breffni Park, Cavan beat Kerry with a last minute goal from Vincent McGovern, ending their five-in-a-row bid. Cavan later defeated Galway by one point in the final to become the first Ulster county to win the Sam Maguire Cup.

Two years later, Cavan defeated Kildare in the 1935 All-Ireland SFC final to win a second title in three years.

Cavan reached 1947 All-Ireland Senior Football Championship Final after defeating Roscommon in the semi-final. The concluding game was played at the Polo Grounds in New York City, the only time the final was held outside of Ireland. Kerry scored two early goals, but Cavan settled and goals from Joe Stafford and Mick Higgins meant they led by a point at half-time. Peter Donohoe kicked eight points over the hour to seal a famous victory for Cavan on a scoreline of 2–11 to 2–7, to bring Sam Maguire to Cavan for a third time.

Cavan followed this up with a one-point win over Mayo in 1948, to win back-to-back titles. The county reached its third successive final in 1949, but was denied a three-in-a-row by Meath, losing by four points.

Cavan responded to that defeat by overcoming Meath after a replay in 1952 to win the county's fifth, and most recent, All-Ireland SFC title. It remains Cavan's latest appearance in an All-Ireland SFC final.

Historically, Cavan have dominated the Ulster Senior Football Championship, winning a record forty titles, most recently in 2020.

The county teams play home games at Kingspan Breffni, Cavan. 2020 Ulster winning Captain and All-Star Raymond Galligan took over as senior football team manager following the resignation of Mickey Graham in 2023.

== Hurling ==
=== Clubs ===
The Cavan Senior Hurling Championship is an annual club competition between the top Cavan clubs. The winners of the Cavan Championship qualify to represent their county in the Ulster Junior Club Hurling Championship and in turn, go on to the All-Ireland Junior Club Hurling Championship. The current Cavan County Champions are [Cootehill Celtic GAA]. The first winners of the Cavan hurling championship were Belturbet in 1908. Mullahoran have won the most titles with a total of 26.

=== County team ===
Traditionally the County board has actively discouraged hurling through their policies football but Hurling has been present in the county. The championship has never been held consistently and at times wasn't finished. Belturbet won the first Cavan Senior Hurling Championship in 1908. Hurling was revived in Cavan in 1917. Cavan Slashers were the standout Hurling team of the early period winning the championship in 1922, 1924, 1927 and 1928. They also won 4-in-a-row between 1933 and 1936.

Again hurling died away in the county with only eight championships been finished between 1937 and 1981. Ballyhaise won successive championships in 1948 and 1949. Granard won their first championship in 1950 and Bailieborough Shamrocks and Cavan Gaels dominated the 1970s and the early 1980s. Bailieborough were victorious in 1966. Cavan Gaels won in 1973 and 1974. Bailieborough won their second championship ten years after the first in 1976 and won again in 1977.

1982 saw the start of Cavan's most successful period in their Hurling history due to the influence of soldiers from hurling counties such as Kilkenny, Clare and Cork who were stationed at the border of the Republic of Ireland and Northern Ireland during the troubles. From 1982 to 1985 Cavan Gaels and Bailieborough Shamrocks won 2 Championships each. Bailieborough won in 1982 and 1984 and Cavan Gaels in 1983 and 1985. The County team also had success winning the Ulster Junior Hurling Championship in 1983 and 1985. In-between both Championships they won the National Hurling League Division 4 in 1984.

Woodford Gaels broke the Cavan Gaels/Bailieborough dominance and won the next 3 championships 1986-1988. No championship was held in 1989 but the 1990s saw the start of the Mullahoran dominance. Mulllahoran won an amazing 21 Cavan Senior Hurling Championship between 1990 and 2010. Mullahoran's dominance was finally broken by Ballymachugh who were runners up to Mullahoran 2005, 2008 and 2009. They beat Mullahoran in 2011 on a score of 4–08 to 1-06. Mullahoran won their 26th championship in 2019 and 4th in a row beating Pearse Óg 2–09 to 0-12.

In 2011, after a disastrous Division 4 league campaign where they ended with a -157 scoring difference the decision was made to discontinue the senior hurling team resulting in Cavan being the only county in Ireland without a senior hurling representative team for nearly 6 years.

Cavan turned out a team for the first time in six years in 2017, and played in the Lory Meagher Cup in 2017, and re-entered the National Hurling League in 2018.

After failing to impress in their first four seasons they made had a surprise run to the 2021 Lory Meagher Cup final beating holders Louth in the semi-final before losing out to Fermanagh in the final.

Cavan have the following achievements in hurling.

- Ulster Junior Hurling Championship: 1983, 1985
- National Hurling League Division 3: 1984
- National Hurling League Division 3B: 2023

Tom "Gawny" Walsh from Bishopswater in County Wexford was a former manager of the Cavan senior hurling team.

== Ladies' football ==
Cavan won the All-Ireland Senior Ladies' Football Championship in 1977 beating Roscommon on a scoreline of 4–03 to 2-03. They lost consecutive finals in 1980 and 1981 losing to Tipperary and Kerry. It wasn't until 2011 that Cavan next reached a Ladies' All-Ireland final. They faced Westmeath in the All-Ireland Intermediate Ladies' Football Championship and lost after a replay. 2 years later they were back. In 2013 they beat Tipperary on a scoreline of 1–14 to 1-12.

The Cavan ladies have won the All-Ireland Senior Ladies' Football Championship once in 1977. In 2013 they won the All-Ireland Intermediate Ladies' Football Championship for the first time.

Their kit and crest differs from that of the men.

== Camogie ==
The high point in Cavan's camogie history was their Ulster senior titles of 1940 and 1941, when they beat Antrim 2–3 to 1–2 after a wrangle over getting permits to travel to war-time Belfast. They lost to Galway by 4–4 to 0–3 in the 1940 All Ireland semi-final, but drew with Dublin in the 1941 semi-final 4–0 to 3-3, thanks to a last-minute goal from Rita Sullivan, losing the replay 3–4 to 1-1. The team was captained by Mollie O’Brien from Killygarry (née Donohoe) who helped revive the game in Cavan in 1968. All Cavan's scores in both matches were scored by Rita Sullivan. Cavan won the second division of the National Camogie League in 1981 and reached the 1994 junior final only to lose to Cork. They won the Máire Ní Chinnéide Cup in 2009. Agnes O'Farrelly and Agnes Hennessy served as presidents of the Camogie Association).

Under Camogie's National Development Plan 2010-2015, "Our Game, Our Passion", Carlow, Cavan, Laois, Louth and Roscommon were to get a total of 17 new clubs by 2015.

Cavan's first camogie success came in the National Camogie Leagues where they won the division 2 title in 1981. Cavan have won the All-Ireland Junior B Camogie Championship once in 2009.
