= Stephen White (Gaelic footballer) =

Irish Gaelic footballer

Personal information
- Native name: Stiofán de Faoite (Irish)
- Born: 1 September 1928 Cooley, County Louth, Ireland
- Died: 6 September 2009 (aged 81) Dundalk, County Louth, Ireland
- Occupation: Insurance agent

Sport
- Sport: Gaelic football
- Position: Left half-back
Clubs
- Years: Club
- Cooley Kickhams; Mountbellew; Dundalk Young Irelands
Club titles
- Louth titles: 1
Inter-county
- Years: County
- 1947-1962: Louth
Inter-county titles
- Leinster titles: 4
- All-Irelands: 1
- NFL: 0

Stephen White (1 September 1928 – 6 September 2009) was an Irish Gaelic footballer who played as a left wing-back for the Louth senior team.

White made his debut on the inter-county scene in 1946 when he linked up with the Galway minor team while attending Mountbellew Agricultural College on a scholarship. That year he played in both the Connacht Minor and Connacht Junior football finals for the Tribesmen. In 1947 he made his senior inter-county debut for Louth. White went on to win an All-Ireland medal in 1957 and four Leinster medals with his county. He was voted Footballer of the Year in 1957 in recognition of his performances for Louth throughout the year. He was also an All-Ireland runner-up in 1950 and captained Louth during the 1951 season.

At club level, White won a Ranafast Cup medal with Cooley Kickhams in 1944 and was a member of the Kickhams side that defeated Oliver Plunketts in the 1947 Louth Junior Championship final. He transferred his allegiance to Dundalk Young Irelands in 1949, going on to win the Louth Senior Championship in 1950 and the Old Gaels Cup in 1957. He finished on the losing side in four County Senior League finals with the Green and Blacks.

At inter-provincial level White was a frequent member of the Leinster team and won four Railway Cup medals, captaining the victorious 1954 side in the final against Connacht. He retired from inter-county football following the conclusion of the 1962 championship, playing his final match in a Leinster Championship quarter-final loss to Dublin. He served as selector and county team manager for a number of years during the late Sixties and early Seventies.

In 1984, as part of the Gaelic Athletic Association's centenary year celebrations, a Football Team of the Century was chosen by a panel of experts. Stephen White was selected at the left half-back position.

Sporting positions
| Preceded by Tom Conlon | Louth Senior Football Captain; 1951 | Succeeded by Paddy Markey |
| Preceded by | Louth Senior Football Manager; 1968–1972 | Succeeded by Jimmy Mulroy |
