= John Joe Cassidy =

Cavan Gaelic footballer

Personal information
- Born: County Cavan, Ireland

Sport
- Sport: Football
- Position: Defender
Clubs
- Years: Club
- Arva; Cavan GFC (New York)
Inter-county
- Years: County
- ?–1950: Cavan
Inter-county titles
- Ulster titles: 6
- All-Irelands: 2
- NFL: 1
- All Stars: 0

John Joe Cassidy was a Gaelic footballer who played for the Cavan county team.

== Playing career ==
Cassidy was born and raised in Arva and got a taste of New York when he represented Cavan in the 1947 All-Ireland Senior Football Championship against Kerry in the Polo Grounds. He lined out at wing half forward in the 1948 and 1952 victorious finals. In the 1952 All-Ireland title success he scored a goal in the drawn game against Meath. Paul Fitzsimons was introduced as sub for John Joe Cassidy in the replay witch Cavan went on to celebrate a 0–9 to 0–5 win. He also won six Ulster titles and two Railway Cup Medals.

Cassidy was top scorer in the 1952 Ulster Senior Football Championship, with a total of 1–7.

== Later years ==
Cassidy emigrated to New York along with Owen Roe McGovern in the early 1950s and became an active member of the Cavan GFC of New York as a player, President and Honorary President, until his death in 1995. John Cassidy has been a successful player in the travel industry and now classic resorts is a well known honeymoon tour operator.
