= Tom O'Reilly (Cavan politician) =

Irish Gaelic footballer, politician, and farmer (1915–1995)

Teachta Dála
- In office May 1944 – February 1948
- Constituency: Cavan

Personal details
- Born: 6 August 1915 Killeshandra, County Cavan, Ireland
- Died: 12 February 1995 (aged 79) County Cavan, Ireland
- Party: Independent

Tom O'Reilly
Sport
- Sport: Gaelic football
- Position: Half-backs
Club
- Years: Club
- Cornafean
Club titles
- Cavan titles: 9
Inter-county
- Years: County
- 1932–1947: Cavan
Inter-county titles
- Ulster titles: 13
- All-Irelands: 3
- NFL: 1

Thomas P. O'Reilly (6 August 1915 – 12 February 1995) was an Irish Gaelic footballer, politician and farmer from County Cavan. He was born at the Derries Upper, Killeshandra, County Cavan. His father was John O'Reilly, who played as goalkeeper on the Cavan county team and his mother was Sarah Anne.

== Gaelic footballer ==
O'Reilly played for Cornafean and the Cavan county team from the early 1930s until the mid-1940s, and was acclaimed as one of the country's greatest midfielders for much of that period. His footballing ability and his large build earned him the name "Big Tom". His brother John Joe O'Reilly was also a noted Cavan footballer.

He first played for Cornafean on the club's junior team which progressed to the Junior Championship semi-final in 1931. Although only sixteen years old, he quickly made a big impression and was at centrefield a year later on the senior team which defeated Bailieboro in the county final. He continued to star as a midfielder for Cornafean until he retired in 1948. He won a total of nine Cavan Senior Football Championship medals and captained Cornafean on seven of those occasions.

However, it was to be his contribution to the Cavan county team that earned him enduring national renown. A star for the county minors and juniors in 1932, he made his debut for the Cavan seniors a year later, and played a key role at midfield when Cavan defeated Galway in the 1933 All-Ireland Senior Football Championship Final. He won a second All Ireland medal two years later and played on the losing Cavan teams in the 1937, 1943 and 1945 finals. He captained the county side from 1937 to 1945 and was still on the Cavan panel when they won the famous 1947 All-Ireland Senior Football Championship Final at the Polo Grounds in New York. He was also a regular on the Ulster teams for the Railway Cup in 1940s.

== Politics ==
O'Reilly was elected to Dáil Éireann as an Independent Teachta Dála (TD) for the Cavan constituency at the 1944 general election. He stood as a Fine Gael candidate at the 1948 general election, but was defeated by another independent candidate, and did not stand for the Dáil again.

In later life, he was a successful businessman.

Dáil	Election	Deputy (Party)	Deputy (Party)	Deputy (Party)	Deputy (Party)
2nd	1921	Arthur Griffith (SF)	Paul Galligan (SF)	Seán Milroy (SF)	3 seats 1921–1923
3rd	1922	Arthur Griffith (PT-SF)	Walter L. Cole (PT-SF)	Seán Milroy (PT-SF)	3 seats 1921–1923
4th	1923	Patrick Smith (Rep)	John James Cole (Ind.)	Seán Milroy (CnaG)	Patrick Baxter (FP)
4th	1925 by-election	Patrick Smith (Rep)	John James Cole (Ind.)	John Joe O'Reilly (CnaG)	Patrick Baxter (FP)
5th	1927 (Jun)	Patrick Smith (FF)	John O'Hanlon (Ind.)	John Joe O'Reilly (CnaG)	Patrick Baxter (FP)
6th	1927 (Sep)	Patrick Smith (FF)	John O'Hanlon (Ind.)	John Joe O'Reilly (CnaG)	John James Cole (Ind.)
7th	1932	Patrick Smith (FF)	John O'Hanlon (Ind.)	John Joe O'Reilly (CnaG)	Michael Sheridan (FF)
8th	1933	Patrick Smith (FF)	Patrick McGovern (NCP)	John Joe O'Reilly (CnaG)	Michael Sheridan (FF)
9th	1937	Patrick Smith (FF)	Patrick McGovern (FG)	John James Cole (Ind.)	Michael Sheridan (FF)
10th	1938	Patrick Smith (FF)	Patrick McGovern (FG)	John James Cole (Ind.)	Michael Sheridan (FF)
11th	1943	Patrick Smith (FF)	Patrick O'Reilly (CnaT)	John James Cole (Ind.)	Michael Sheridan (FF)
12th	1944	Patrick Smith (FF)	Patrick O'Reilly (CnaT)	Tom O'Reilly (Ind.)	Michael Sheridan (FF)
13th	1948	Patrick Smith (FF)	John Tully (CnaP)	Patrick O'Reilly (Ind.)	Michael Sheridan (FF)
14th	1951	Patrick Smith (FF)	John Tully (CnaP)	Patrick O'Reilly (FG)	Michael Sheridan (FF)
15th	1954	Patrick Smith (FF)	John Tully (CnaP)	Patrick O'Reilly (FG)	Michael Sheridan (FF)
16th	1957	Patrick Smith (FF)	John Tully (CnaP)	Patrick O'Reilly (FG)	Michael Sheridan (FF)
17th	1961	Patrick Smith (FF)	Séamus Dolan (FF)	Patrick O'Reilly (FG)	3 seats 1961–1977
18th	1965	Patrick Smith (FF)	John Tully (CnaP)	Tom Fitzpatrick (FG)	3 seats 1961–1977
19th	1969	Patrick Smith (FF)	Patrick O'Reilly (FG)	Tom Fitzpatrick (FG)	3 seats 1961–1977
20th	1973	Patrick Smith (FF)	John Wilson (FF)	Tom Fitzpatrick (FG)	3 seats 1961–1977
21st	1977	Constituency abolished. See Cavan–Monaghan			
