= Paul Fitzsimons =

Cavan Gaelic footballer

Personal information
- Born: County Cavan, Ireland

Sport
- Sport: Gaelic football
- Position: Forward
Club
- Years: Club
- Maghera MacFinns
Inter-county
- Years: County
- Cavan
Inter-county titles
- All-Irelands: 1
- NFL: 1
- All Stars: 0

Paul Fitzsimons is a former Gaelic footballer who played for the Cavan county team.

== County career ==
Paul Fitzsimons lined out at corner forward in the 1952 victorious final. he played in the drawn game and was introduced as sub for John Joe Cassidy in the replay and went on to score 1pt. Cavan went on to celebrate a 0–9 to 0–5 win.
