= Columba McDyer =

Cavan and Donegal Gaelic footballer

Personal information
- Native name: Colm Mac Duibhir (Irish)
- Born: Kilraine, County Donegal, Ireland
- Occupation: Teacher of Construction Studies

Sport
- Sport: Gaelic football
- Position: Centre half-forward
Club
- Years: Club
- ?–?: Glenties
Inter-county
- Years: County
- 1942–1947: Cavan; Donegal
Inter-county titles
- Ulster titles: 3
- All-Irelands: 1
- NFL: 0
- All Stars: 0

Columba McDyer (13 January 1921 – 18 September 2001) was a Gaelic footballer who played for Cavan and Donegal.

== Playing career ==
McDyer was from Glenties, and played as a centre half-forward. He played with the Cavan team that won the 1947 All-Ireland Senior Football Championship Final at the Polo Grounds in New York City. This resulted in him becoming the first Donegal man to win an All-Ireland Senior Football Championship medal.

Following his success with Cavan, McDyer returned to Donegal and his native Glenties where he coached the Donegal senior team for a number of years. He also collected a Railway Cup medal with Ulster in 1942 and he also played in the same competition with Connacht.

== Managerial career ==
McDyer managed Donegal. He was also an early influence on Jim McGuinness, Donegal's future All-Ireland winning manager. McGuinness described him as "an absolute gentleman to the fingertips, very well-educated… a very gentle, bubbly person".

== Honours ==
McDyer was inducted into the Donegal Sports Star Awards' Hall of Fame in 1987.
