= 1949 All-Ireland Minor Football Championship =

Gaelic football competition

All-Ireland Champions
- Winning team: Armagh (1st win)

All-Ireland Finalists
- Losing team: Kerry

Provincial Champions
- Munster: Kerry
- Leinster: Dublin
- Ulster: Armagh
- Connacht: Sligo

The 1949 All-Ireland Minor Football Championship was the 18th staging of the All-Ireland Minor Football Championship, the Gaelic Athletic Association's premier inter-county Gaelic football tournament for boys under the age of 18.

Tyrone entered the championship as defending champions, however, they were defeated in the Ulster Championship.

On 25 September 1949, Armagh won the championship following a 1-7 to 1-5 defeat of Kerry in the All-Ireland final. This was their first All-Ireland title.

== Results ==
=== All-Ireland Minor Football Championship ===
Semi-Finals

Final

25 September 1949 Final	Armagh	1-07 - 1-05	Kerry	Croke Park, Dublin

== Championship statistics ==
=== Miscellaneous ===
Sligo
