= John Forde (Gaelic footballer) =

Irish Gaelic footballer

Personal information
- Native name: Seán Mac Giollarnáth (Irish)
- Born: 1920 Ardnaree, County Mayo
- Died: 18 April 2010 (aged 89–90)

Sport
- Sport: Gaelic football
- Position: Corner-back
Club
- Years: Club
- 1940s–1950s: Ballina Stephenites
Inter-county
- Years: County
- 1949–1955: Mayo
Inter-county titles
- Connacht titles: 2
- All-Irelands: 2
- NFL: 2

John Forde (1920 – 18 April 2010) was an Irish sportsperson. He played Gaelic football with his local clubs Ardnaree and Ballina Stephenites and was a member of the senior Mayo county team from 1949 until 1955.
