= Owen Roe McGovern =

Cavan Gaelic footballer

Personal information
- Native name: Eoin Rua Mag Shamhrain (Irish)
- Born: 1917 Swanlinbar, County Cavan, Ireland
- Died: 2 May 2011 (aged 93–94)
- Occupation: Publican

Sport
- Sport: Gaelic football
- Position: Defender
Clubs
- Years: Club
- pre 1950 1950–1957: Swanlinbar St Mary's; Clan na Gael/Dublin
Inter-county
- Years: County
- 1945–1950: Cavan
Inter-county titles
- Ulster titles: 4
- All-Irelands: 2
- NFL: 2
- All Stars: 0

Owen Roe McGovern (December 1917 – 2 May 2011) was a former Gaelic footballer who played for the Cavan county team, winning two All-Ireland Senior Football Championship medals in 1947 and '48.

== Playing career ==
A native of Swanlinbar, he could play at corner-back or half-back. He was a member of the great Cavan squad which won the All-Ireland Final in the Polo Grounds, New York City in 1947. In the 1948 All-Ireland title success Owen Roe replaced John Joe O'Reilly as a second-half substitute in defence. The following year he started at left corner-back in the Final, but Meath denied Cavan the three in a row. He was a member of the Cavan squad when they won their first National Football League title in the 1947/48 season and he lined out at right half-back when Cavan reclaimed the National Football League title in 1949/50.

== Personal life ==
He served in the Irish Army before emigrating to Elizabeth, New Jersey, with his wife Philomena in 1957. They have three sons and one daughter. He was publican of Morley and McGovern public house for many years. Owen Roe was the last survivor from Cavan's All-Ireland winning teams of 1947 and '48. Owen Roe McGovern died on 2 May 2011.

Despite controversy in Ireland over hosting the 1947 All-Ireland final in New York, one comfort for Irish emigrants there and for Owen Roe was that he got to see his older brother, Patrick, for the first time since Patrick had left Cavan in the 1920s.
