= Des Benson =

Cavan Gaelic footballer

Personal information
- Born: Killeshandra, County Cavan, Ireland

Sport
- Sport: Gaelic football
- Position: Goalkeeper
Club
- Years: Club
- Killeshandra
Inter-county
- Years: County
- Cavan
Inter-county titles
- Ulster titles: ?
- All-Irelands: 2
- NFL: 1
- All Stars: 0

Des Benson (November 1921 – January 2007) was a Gaelic footballer who played for the Cavan county team.

== Playing career ==
Des Benson was a goalkeeper for Cavan in the 1940s and was considered to be one of the most underrated players of Cavan's glorious period. He won an All-Ireland Minor Football Championship medal in 1938. He was Cavan's reserve goalkeeper in the squad that won the All-Ireland Senior Football Championship Final in the Polo Grounds, New York in 1947. He played in the All-Ireland Final the following year against Mayo. His memorable save against Kerry helped the Blues achieve their first National Football League title in 1948. He was also on the first University College Dublin team ever to win the Dublin championship.
