= Victor Sherlock =

Cavan and Meath Gaelic footballer

Personal information
- Native name: Buadhach Ó Scorlóg (Irish)
- Born: 1924 Kingscourt, County Cavan
- Died: 21 June 2004 (age 80) Kilmainhamwood, County Meath

Sport
- Sport: Gaelic football
- Position: Left half forward, Midfield
Clubs
- Years: Club
- 1944–1947 1947–1948 1948–1965: Gypsum Rangers; Scotstown; Kingscourt Stars
Club titles
- Cavan titles: 2
- Ulster titles: 0
- All-Ireland Titles: 0
Inter-county
- Years: County
- 1945–1947 1948–1953: Meath; Cavan
Inter-county titles
- Ulster titles: 5
- All-Irelands: 2
- NFL: 2
- All Stars: 0

Victor Sherlock (1924–2004) was a Gaelic footballer who played for Meath and Cavan. Among other honours, he won All-Ireland Senior Football Championship medals in 1948 and 1952 with Cavan.

== Playing career ==
Sherlock was a versatile footballer. He played left half forward with Meath winning the 1945/46 National Football League beating Wexford 2-2 to 6 pts and he won a Leinster Senior Football Championship medal in 1947. He then transferred to Cavan where he formed a brilliant midfield partnership with Phil 'The Gunner' Brady and scored a goal against Mayo in the 1948 Final. Phil Brady become his brother-in-law in 1953. He won his 2nd National Football League medal in 1949/50 season. He collected 4 Railway Cup medals with Ulster.

Sherlock received many Ulster handball championship medals and one Junior All-Ireland singles medal in 1949.

== Death ==
Victor Sherlock died at Kilmainhamwood Nursing Home at the age of 80 on 21 June 2004.

== Honours ==
Meath

- National Football League: 1
  - 1946
- Leinster Senior Football Championship: 1
  - 1947

Cavan

- All-Ireland Senior Football Championships: 2
  - 1948, 1952
- Railway Cups: 4
  - 1947, 1950, 1956, 1960
- National Football League: 1
  - 1950
- Ulster Senior Football Championships: 5
  - 1948, 1949, 1952, 1954, 1955
- Cavan Senior Football Championships: 2
  - 1954, 1961
