= Hughie O'Reilly =

Cavan Gaelic footballer and team manager

Hughie O'Reilly (1904 – 1976)
Personal information
- Native name: Aodh Ó Raghallaigh (Irish)
- Born: Cootehill, County Cavan, Ireland
- Occupation: ?

Sport
- Sport: Gaelic football
- Position: midfield
Club
- Years: Club
- Cootehill Celtic GAA Club
Inter-county
- Years: County
- 1927–1952: Cavan
Inter-county titles
- Ulster titles: 19
- All-Irelands: 2

Hugh 'Hughie' O'Reilly was a Gaelic footballer and manager of Cootehill Celtic GAA Club and the Cavan county team.

== Playing career ==
The Cootehill clubman is the only man to be involved in all of Cavan's Senior All-Ireland Championship victories. He played and won 2 All-Ireland Senior Football Championship medal in 1933 and captained Cavan to victory in the 1935 final. Hughie also featured on the 1927 All-Ireland-winning junior team.

== Management career ==
He completed a record of three All-Ireland senior titles in 1947, '48 and '52 in the space of five years and National Football League titles in 1948 and '50 as manager for Cavan. Cootehill Celtic GAA's pitch in the town is named after him.

As a disciplinarian, he emphasizes training in the basic skills of catching, kicking, and passing the ball. Hughie had 28 famous tips, many of which are still valid today.

1. Play your own area
2. Goalie, keep backs in position
3. Full backs, clear ball to wings
4. Backs mark closely, but at the same time dominate play
5. Backs keep between opponent and goal
6. Half backs place forward with clearance
7. Backs meet in coming forwards
8. Always mark free kicks
9. Never let the ball hop
10. Never turn your back on the ball
11. Two kicks are greater than one
12. Get in front of your opponent
13. When not in possession, get into position
14. Keep up pressure
15. Don't hesitate to shoot inside 30 yards
16. Shoot for points, goals will follow
17. Move into position for pass
18. Full forwards remember half forwards
19. Play ball on the ground
20. Go forward to meet the ball
21. Kick ball before being tackled
22. Always play the ball
23. Avoid clashing
24. Keep trying
25. Remember your opponent is getting it as hard as yourself
26. Keep moving all during game and take deep breaths
27. Get off the ground when about to receive a knock
28. Go out and win but for God's sake, play the game

Achievements
Preceded by Mick Higgins (Galway)	All-Ireland SFC winning captain 1935	Succeeded by Séamus O'Malley (Mayo)
