= Tony Tighe =

Cavan Gaelic footballer

Personal information
- Born: County Cavan, Ireland

Sport
- Sport: Gaelic football
- Position: Midfield, Forward
Clubs
- Years: Club
- Mountnugent; St Tiernach (Clones); Castlerahan
Inter-county
| Years | County | Apps (scores) |
| 1945–1953 | Cavan | 10–25 (55 pts) |
Inter-county titles
- Ulster titles: 6
- All-Irelands: 3
- NFL: 1
- All Stars: 0

Anthony Tighe (1927–2005) was a former Gaelic footballer who played for the Cavan county team. He won three All-Ireland Senior Football Championship medals: in 1947, 1948 and 1952.

== Playing career ==
Tighe was 18 years old when he played at midfield on the Cavan team that lost the 1945 All-Ireland final to Cork. He played at right half-forward when Cavan beat Kerry in the 1947 All-Ireland Senior Football Championship Final in the New York. He had a major impact on the result and scored 1 point. He scored two goals in the 1948 final against Mayo and two more from the full forward position against arch rivals Meath in the 1952 drawn final, adding a point in the replayed victory. He also won 2 National Football League medal in 1947 & 1949. He collected 2 Railway Cup medal with Ulster in 1950 and '53.

== Death ==
Tighe had attended the All-Ireland football fourth round qualifier between Cavan and Mayo at Roscommon's Dr Hyde Park, and was leaving the grounds when he collapsed and died shortly afterwards, aged 77. The funeral took place from the Sacred Heart Church, Clones to the Sacred Heart Cemetery.
