= Willie Doonan =

Cavan Gaelic footballer

Personal information
- Born: County Cavan, Ireland

Sport
- Sport: Gaelic football
- Position: right back
Clubs
- Years: Club
- 1971 1941 1949: Cavan Gaels; Cavan Slashers; Cavan Harps
Inter-county
- Years: County
- 1945–1950: Cavan
Inter-county titles
- Ulster titles: 4
- All-Irelands: 2
- NFL: 1

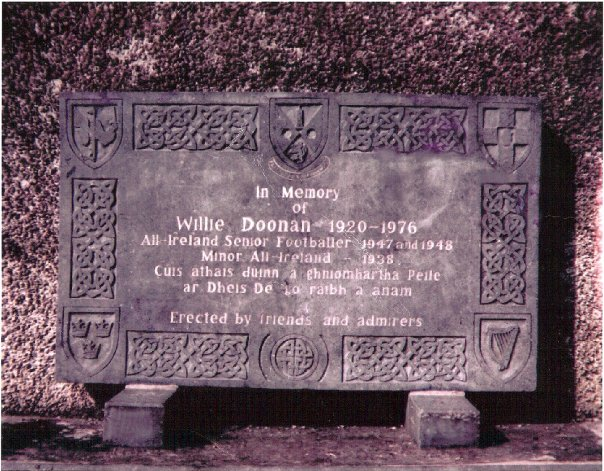
Willie Doonan's Memorial stone outside Breffni Park

Willie Doonan (16 April 1920 – August 1976) was a Gaelic footballer who played for the Cavan county team.

== Inter-county career ==
Doonan served with the British Army in Italy during World War 2. He was shot, injured his knee and ankle and was honourably discharged in 1945. He was selected for Cavan in the Ulster campaign and subsequent All-Ireland Final defeat to Cork. He went on to win 2 All-Ireland Senior Football Championship medals. He was right back on the 1947 and 1948 teams and he won every honour the game could bestow including All-Ireland Minor Football Championship Minor in 1938. He also won the National Football League in 1949/50 season. He was also a noted soccer player and played for Dundalk for a couple of seasons missing out on Cavan's All Ireland final defeat to Meath in 1949.

== Club career ==
He won 1 Cavan Senior Club Football Championship with Cavan Slashers 1941 and a Senior League medal Cavan Harps 1949. He later returned to England for a period of 15 years but came home to assist the Cavan Gaels as Team Manager in their League win of 1971.

== Death ==
He died August 1976, aged 56.

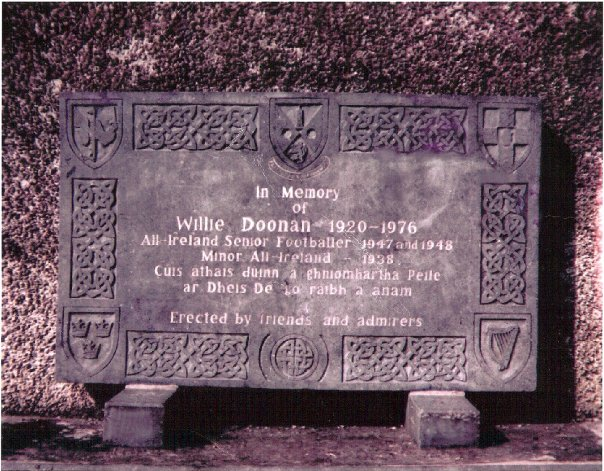
Willie Doonans Memorial, Breffni Park
