= Simon Deignan =

Irish Gaelic footballer and referee (1922–2006)

Personal information
- Born: 1922 Mullagh, County Cavan, Ireland
- Died: September 2006 (aged 84) Glasnevin, Dublin, Ireland
- Occupations: Lieutenant in the Irish Army; auctioneer

Sport
- Sport: Gaelic football
- Position: Half back
Club
- Years: Club
- Cavan Gaels
Inter-county
- Years: County
- 1938–1953: Cavan
Inter-county titles
- Ulster titles: 11
- All-Irelands: 3
- NFL: 1

Simon Deignan (1922 – September 2006) was a former Gaelic footballer for the Cavan county team, and a referee.

== Early life and family ==
Deignan was born in 1922 in Mullagh, County Cavan, Ireland.

His grandnephew is the Dublin footballer Jonny Cooper.

== Playing career ==
A native of Mullagh. Deignan won an All-Ireland Minor Football Championship medal in 1938. He formed a brilliant half back partnership with P. J. Duke & J. J. O'Reilly that won the All-Ireland Senior Football Championship Final in the Polo Grounds, New York in 1947. He was again one of the Breffni county’s stars in the ’48 All-Ireland Final double success. He also won the National Football League in 1949/50 season. He won numerous Railway Cup medals with Ulster.

He was also a noted referee, officiating at the 1950, 1954 and 1958 All-Ireland Senior Football Championship Finals.

== Death ==
He died in September 2006 in Bon Secours Hospital, Glasnevin, aged 84. His funeral took place from the Church of Our Mother of Divine Grace, Ballygall Road East to Dardistown cemetery.
