= Edwin Carolan =

Cavan Gaelic footballer (??–1982)

Personal information
- Native name: Edwin Ó Cearbhalláin (Irish)
- Born: Mullagh, County Cavan, Ireland
- Occupation: Veterinary Inspector

Sport
- Sport: Gaelic football
- Position: Forward
Club
- Years: Club
- Cavan Gaels
Inter-county
- Years: County
- Cavan
Inter-county titles
- Ulster titles: ?
- All-Irelands: 3
- NFL: 1

Edwin Carolan (died 22 January 1982) was a Gaelic footballer who played for the Cavan county team.

== Playing career ==
A native of Mullagh. He was a member of the great Cavan squad which won the All-Ireland Final in the Polo Grounds, New York in 1947. He won a second All-Ireland Senior Football Championship medal the following year. But, he is best remembered for scoring the equalising point to earn Cavan a replay in the 1952 All-Ireland Final against County Meath, Cavan went on to win the replay. He also won the National Football League in 1949/50 season. His brother Pat Carolan also played in the 1952 Final. He won 1 Sigerson Cup medal with University College Dublin and won numerous Railway Cup medals with Ulster. He helped establish Cavan Gaels and won a 1958 League medal with the town.

Edwin Carolan Memorial Park is named after him.
