= Joe Stafford =

Cavan Gaelic footballer

Personal information
- Native name: Seosamh Stafort (Irish)
- Born: 19 March 1918 Killinkere, County Cavan, Ireland
- Died: 17 June 2000 (aged 82) St. Vincent's Hospital, Dublin, Ireland
- Occupation: Hotelier
- Height: 5 ft 9 in (175 cm)

Sport
- Sport: Gaelic football
- Position: Right corner-forward
Clubs
- Years: Club
- Killinkere; Seán McDermotts
Club titles
- Cavan titles: 0
Inter-county
- Years: County
- 1943–1950: Cavan
Inter-county titles
- Ulster titles: 6
- All-Irelands: 2
- NFL: 1

Joseph Stafford (10 March 1918 – 17 June 2000) was a Gaelic footballer who played for the Cavan county team.

== Playing career ==
Stafford played at right full forward and was a prolific goalscorer for Cavan in the 1940s. He is 9th in All-time top Ulster goalscorers chart. His goal was crucial in securing Cavan's famous victory in the All-Ireland Senior Football Championship Final in Polo Grounds, New York in 1947. He helped Cavan retain the title the following year against County Mayo. He also won a National Football League medal in 1949/50 season. Joe Stafford was the first man to be sent off in an All-Ireland final. He had been ordered off with fifteen minutes left in the 1943 All-Ireland Senior Football Championship Final against Roscommon. His nephew, Jimmy Stafford, also played with Cavan in the 1960s and 1970s.
