= Mick Higgins =

Cavan Gaelic footballer

Personal information
- Native name: Mícheál Ó hUiginn (Irish)
- Born: 22 August 1922 New York City, United States
- Died: 28 January 2010 (aged 87)
- Occupation: Garda Síochána

Sport
- Sport: Gaelic football
Club
- Years: Club
- 1950s–1950s: Mountnugent
Club titles
- Cavan titles: 1
Inter-county
- Years: County
- 1940s–1950s: Cavan
Inter-county titles
- Ulster titles: 7
- All-Irelands: 3
- NFL: 2
- All Stars: 1 (All Time All Star)

Michael Higgins (22 August 1922 – 28 January 2010) was an Irish Gaelic footballer who played at senior level for the Cavan county team, winning three All-Ireland medals during his career. In later years he was a successful coach.

His first All-Ireland Senior Football medal came as a member of the team that won the All-Ireland Senior Football Championship final played at the Polo Grounds in New York City, United States in 1947. Cavan retained that title the following year and won it again in 1952 when Higgins was captain of the team. Higgins also won the Ulster Senior Football Championship with Cavan on seven occasions, as well as both the National Football League and Railway Cup on two occasions each.

Higgins won the Cavan Senior Football Championship with Mountnugent GAA in 1946, he played with famous players such as Tony Tighe, Peter Donohue and Connie Kelly.

Upon his death in 2010 Higgins was said by the Irish Independent's Martin Breheny to have been "widely regarded as one of the greatest talents ever to emerge from Cavan". Eugene McGee, in the Longford Leader, described him as "a man who became a GAA superstar of his generation, despite limited coverage of games he played". Seán Moran of The Irish Times described him as "one of the great football figures of the last century".

== Early and personal life ==
Higgins was born in New York. At the age of five he moved to Kilnaleck, County Cavan, birthplace of his mother. He served in the Garda Síochána, eventually being promoted to the rank of sergeant. He married his wife Margaret and with her had four children, son John and daughters Terry, Jean and Brenda, all five of whom outlived him. Amongst his other interests were greyhound racing and he trained the dogs.

== Career ==
=== Playing career ===
In 1943, Higgins debuted in the Ulster Senior Football Championship in a game against Monaghan. Cavan won the tournament that year. In 1947 he flew for 30 hours with the Cavan team to New York to play in that year's All-Ireland Senior Football Championship final, held abroad on that occasion to mark the centenary of the Great Famine and celebrate the Irish who emigrated at this time. Cavan beat Kerry, giving Higgins his first All-Ireland medal. To celebrate the team embarked on a voyage on the RMS Queen Mary being greeted by crowds of people in Southampton, London and Birmingham. Cavan beat Mayo in the 1948 final to retain the All-Ireland Senior Football Championship but lost to Meath in the 1949 final to miss out on three consecutive titles. However, Higgins went on to win his third All-Ireland medal with Cavan in 1952.

=== Coaching career ===
Mick Higgins
Sport
Inter-county management
- Years: Team
- 1950s 1960s 1970s: Cavan; Longford; Donegal (assistant)

After retiring as a player Higgins entered coaching. He won the Ulster Senior Football Championship on three occasions with Cavan and also led them to their most recent appearance in any All-Ireland final in 1959 when they were defeated by Dublin in that year's All-Ireland Minor Football Championship final.

During the 1960s Higgins was the coach of the Longford county team when it won the National Football League (1966) and its first (and at the time of his death only) Leinster Senior Football Championship (1968). He also led them to an O'Byrne Cup title in 1965. By the time he stepped down in September 1969, he had been managing Longford since July 1965 and through the most successful period in their history. He also assisted the Donegal county team with its first Ulster Senior Football Championship win (1972).

== Later years and death ==
In recognition of his skills and long-running contribution to the sport, Higgins was awarded the 1987 All-Time All Star Award as no GAA All Stars Awards were being issued at the time of his playing career. In 1989 he was entered into the Texaco Hall of Fame. In November 2009, the Irish Independent selected him as the 36th best player in the newspaper's all-time list of 125 players.

He was interviewed at his Virginia home in 2002. In an interview shortly before his death Higgins was asked what his legacy would be. He replied:

That I never hit anyone, I played a clean game and I was never put off.

Higgins died at the age of 87 in January 2010. His funeral and burial took place on 30 January 2010. At his death Cavan had not featured in an All-Ireland Senior Football Championship final since Higgins's last win in 1952. His death meant that Owen Roe McGovern, who died in 2011, was the last survivor from Cavan All-Ireland winning teams of 1947 and '48.

In his tribute Christy Cooney, President of the Gaelic Athletic Association, said Higgins was "a man who made an immense and lasting contribution to Gaelic games".

== See also ==
- List of All-Ireland Senior Football Championship winning captains
- All-Time All Star Award (football)

Achievements
Preceded by Seán Flanagan (Mayo)	All-Ireland SFC winning captain 1952	Succeeded by Jas Murphy (Kerry)
