= Peter Donohoe (Gaelic footballer) =

Cavan Gaelic footballer

Personal information
- Born: County Cavan, Ireland

Sport
- Sport: Gaelic football
- Position: Back, Midfield, Full forward
Club
- Years: Club
- Crosserlough GFC Mountnugent GFC
Inter-county
Years	County	Apps (scores)
1944–1955	Cavan	17–133 (184 pts)
Inter-county titles
- Ulster titles: 7
- All-Irelands: 3
- NFL: 1
- All Stars: 0

Peter Donohoe (died April 2004) was a Gaelic footballer who played for the Cavan county team.

== Playing career ==
Donohoe played at full forward and was a prolific freetaker for Cavan in the 1940s and early 1950s . Peter Donohoe's eight points from frees were crucial in securing Cavan's famous victory in the All-Ireland Senior Football Championship Final in Polo Grounds, New York in 1947. He was named Man of the Match and was later described in the New York press as the babe Ruth of Gaelic Football. He helped Cavan retain the title the following year by scoring 2–2 in the final against County Mayo. He also won a National Football League medal in 1949/50 season. Peter was also honoured at the Anglo-Celt GAA 1989 Sports Awards, held in May 1990, when he also won the Hall of Fame award.

He is Ulster's all-time goalscorer with 17 goals and is fifth in the all-time top Ulster scorers chart with 184 points.
