= Phil Brady (Gaelic footballer) =

Cavan Gaelic footballer

Philip Brady
Personal information
- Native name: Philib Ó Brádaigh (Irish)
- Born: County Cavan, Ireland
- Occupation: Garda

Sport
- Sport: Gaelic football
- Position: Midfield, Full Back
Club
- Years: Club
- Mullahoran GFC
Inter-county
- Years: County
- 1945–1952: Cavan
Inter-county titles
- Ulster titles: 6
- All-Irelands: 3
- NFL: 1
- All Stars: 0

Phil Brady (died 8 May 1980) was a Gaelic footballer who played for the Cavan county team. He won All-Ireland Senior Football Championship medals in 1947, 1948, and 1952.

== Playing career ==
Brady was a Gaelic footballer who played for Cavan. He scored a point in the 1947 All-Ireland Final at the Polo Grounds and played at midfield in the 1948 final. In 1952, he played at full-back in the All-Ireland final. His honors include a National Football League medal (1949–1950) and a Railway Cup medal with Ulster (1950).

He is also the uncle of five times world handball champion Paul Brady.
