= John Joe O'Reilly (Gaelic footballer) =

Gaelic footballer (1918–1952)

Personal information
- Native name: Seán Seosamh Ó Raghallaigh (Irish)
- Nickname: The Gallant John Joe
- Born: 3 June 1918 Killeshandra, County Cavan, Ireland
- Died: 22 November 1952 (aged 34) Dublin / The Curragh, Ireland
- Occupation: Commandant in the Irish army

Sport
- Sport: Gaelic football
- Position: Half-Back
Clubs
- Years: Club
- 1934–1938: Cornafean; Curragh Camp
Club titles
- Cavan titles: 2 (+ 1 Kildare)
Inter-county
Years	County	Apps (scores)
1937–1952	Cavan	62
Inter-county titles
- Ulster titles: 11
- All-Irelands: 2
- NFL: 1

John Joe O'Reilly (1918 – 1952) was a legendary Gaelic footballer who played for the Cavan county team. He is the only man to lead a team to All-Ireland glory outside of Ireland, having captained the Cavan team to victory against Kerry in the iconic 1947 All-Ireland Senior Football Championship Final played at the Polo Grounds in New York City.

== Playing career ==
Born at the Derries Upper, Killeshandra, County Cavan, his father was Big John O'Reilly who played as the goalkeeper on the Cavan county team and his mother was Sarah Anne. After early successes with St Patrick's College, Cavan and his club, Cornafean, he captained the Cavan county team, which won All-Ireland Senior Football Championships in 1947 (at the New York City Polo Grounds) and 1948, having also played on three losing sides in the final. He won 11 Ulster senior football medals, as Cavan took the title each year from 1937 until 1949, except two. He won a National Football League medal and four Railway Cup medals, in 1942 and 1943 (when he was the first ever Cavan captain), 1947 and as captain again in 1950. John Joe O'Reilly was one of only eight men to have had the honour of being presented with the Sam Maguire twice as captain.

O'Reilly's father also played in goal for Cavan and his brother, Tom O’Reilly, played on the 1947 All-Ireland winning team and also won Railway Cup medals for Ulster in 1943 and 1944.

== Death and legacy ==
A Commandant in the Irish Army, John Joe O'Reilly, suffered a serious injury during a football match against Ardclough in 1952 from which he never recovered. He died in the General Military Hospital in the Curragh on 22 November 1952 at only 34 years of age. In 1984, the GAA's centenary year he was named at centre half-back on the Football Team of the Century. In 1999 he was again honoured by the GAA by being named on their Gaelic Football Team of the Millennium. The song "The Gallant John Joe" was written by Peter Albert McGovern, Swanlinbar County Cavan Ireland, as a tribute to John Joe O'Reilly.

== Statue ==
On 20 November 2022, two days before the 70th anniversary of his death, a 7-foot bronze statue of John Joe, sculpted by Seamus Connolly, was unveiled at Market Square in Cavan. The unveiling celebrations included speeches by GAA President Larry McCarthy, iconic Kerry GAA midfielder Mick O'Connell and was attended by a huge array of GAA legends, including Brian McEniff and Jimmy Deenihan, as well as representation from the Defence Forces. It is the first GAA monument in the province of Ulster.

== Honours ==
=== Cornafean GAA ===
- Cavan Senior Football Championship

Winner (2): 1936, 1937

=== Curragh Camp ===
- Kildare Senior Football Championship

Winner (1): 1948 (captain)

- Kildare Senior Hurling Championship

Winner (1): 1940

=== Cavan ===
- All-Ireland Senior Football Championship

Winner (2): 1947 (Captain), 1948 (captain)

- Ulster Senior Football Championship

Winner (11): 1937, 1939, 1940, 1941, 1942, 1943, 1944 (captain), 1945, 1947 (captain), 1948 (captain), 1949 (captain)

- National Football League

Winner (1): 1947-48 (captain)

- Dr McKenna Cup

Winner (3): 1940, 1943, 1951 (captain)

=== Ulster ===
- Railway Cup

Winner (4): 1942 (captain), 1943 (captain), 1947, 1950 (captain)

=== St Patrick's College, Cavan ===
- MacRory Cup

Winner (3): 1935, 1936, 1937 (captain)

== See also ==
- List of people on the postage stamps of Ireland

Achievements
Preceded by Paddy Kennedy (Kerry)	All-Ireland SFC winning captain 1947–1948	Succeeded by Brian Smyth (Meath)
