= 1955 All-Ireland Senior Football Championship final =

- Event: 1955 All-Ireland Senior Football Championship
Kerry	Dublin
0–12 (12)	1–6 (9)
- Date: 25 September 1955
- Venue: Croke Park, Dublin
- Referee: Willie Goodison (Wexford)
- Attendance: 87,102 (at least)

The 1955 All-Ireland Senior Football Championship final was the 68th All-Ireland Final and the deciding match of the 1955 All-Ireland Senior Football Championship, an inter-county Gaelic football tournament for the top teams in Ireland. A then record crowd attended. The game went down in history as "famous" and a "classic". The team's relationship with the Hill 16 terrace has been traced to this day. It also marked the arrival of an indigenous Dublin team onto the national stage; previous Dublin teams had hired countrymen to fill their ranks.

== Paths to the final ==
Dublin had drawn much attention to themselves by dismantling the reigning All-Ireland champions Meath in the final of that year's Leinster Senior Football Championship. It was a twenty-point win, with Kevin Heffernan contributing a five-goal tally. Dublin required a replay to beat Mayo in the All-Ireland semi-final.

== Pre-match ==
Until the Wednesday before the final Kerry's seven-day-a-week training regime, led by Dr Eamonn O'Sullivan, began with a brisk walk before celebration of Mass each morning; there followed light breakfast, a training session out on the pitch, lunch, an afternoon training session. This was considered revolutionary at the time, particularly as the GAA, fearing the advent of professionalism within its ranks, had implemented an unsuccessful ban on collective training of inter-county teams just the year before, only for it to be overturned within a year.

British Rail were forced to schedule extra trains to Holyhead such was the clamour to see a Dublin team playing a new brand of football. Queues formed in London's Euston railway station.

Much of the curiosity on the part of would-be spectators was an effort to see a purely Dublin-born team, based mainly around the St Vincent's club of the 1940s and into the 1950s. This differed from the established routine of Dublin bringing countrymen in to play for their county team. Heffernan and Ollie Freaney adopted "scientific" ideas that went against the usual catch and kick mantra of the sport. Cyril Freaney, who also played in the final (as corner-forward), later recalled the level of opposition to this approach: "You had people shouting 'soccer, soccer', we were 'soccerites'". Indeed, Heffernan was a known admirer of Don Revie — an Englishman who played soccer only — so his reputation as a traitor to his sport was somewhat justified.

While Dublin were considered favourite to win, many media reports tipped eventual victors Kerry. Among those publications to tip Kerry in their previews were the Sunday Independent, Cork Examiner and local news sheet The Kerryman. The Irish Independent and The Irish Press also suggested the likelihood of Kerry win was strong. John D. Hickey, in the Irish Independent, referenced Kerry's "rather peculiar state of thing", their expectation of victory, "they do believe and not without some reason that they are a law unto themselves when it comes to an All-Ireland final".

On the night before the game, five members of the Dublin team went for a walk on the pier at Howth.

By 11:00 am on the morning of the game, with four hours still remaining, no sideline seats were available. The gates of Croke Park closed to the public twenty minutes before the minor final got underway. However, the gates were broken down and the official attendance rendered obsolete as many more people poured into the stadium. On the morning of the game, the Dublin team gathered in Barry's Hotel to dine on scrambled leg. Yet the Dublin team were depleted: Norman Allen was ruled out of the game with appendicitis, Marcus Wilson had an injured legg, "Jim" McGuinness was also not fully fit and Heffernan had injured his ankle during a training session on the previous Tuesday. Heffernan heard of an Australian rugby doctor who happened to be in Clontarf and decided to experiment by asking him to inject him.

== Match ==
This year's final was played on 25 September.

=== Summary ===
Dublin lined out with blue socks for the first time; before this they had worn their club colours.

Tadghie Lyne scored six points to give Kerry a commanding 0–12 to 0–6 lead. Ollie Freaney's goal five minutes from the brought Dublin within three points, but Kerry weathered the storm and won.

It was the second of three All-Ireland football titles won by Kerry in the 1950s.

Kerry player Jim Brosnan, scorer of two crucial second-half points, was flown home from New York for the final; he was over there studying medicine. His studies were more advanced than Heffernan's, whose injection ultimately failed.

=== Details ===
25 September 1955
Final

Kerry	0–12 – 1–6	Dublin
J Dowling (0–1), P Sheehy (0–1), T Lyne (0–6), M Murphy (0–1), J Brosnan (0–2)		O Freaney 1–3, J Boyle 0–2, H Hefferan 0–1

Croke Park, Dublin
Attendance: 87,102
Referee: Willie Goodison (Wexford)

==== Kerry ====
- 1 Garry O'Mahony
- 2 Jerome O'Shea
- 3 Ned Roche
- 4 Mixie Palmer
- 5 Seán Murphy
- 6 John Cronin
- 7 Tom Moriarty
- 8 John Dowling (c)
- 9 Dinny O'Shea
- 10 Paudie Sheehy
- 11 Tom Costelloe
- 12 Tadhg Lyne
- 13 Johnny Culloty
- 14 Mick Murphy
- 15 Jim Brosnan

Sub used
16 John Joe Sheehan for T. Moriarty

Subs not used
17 Gerald O'Sullivan
18 Bobby Buckley
19 Dan McAuliffe
20 Colm Kennelly
21 Dermot Dillon
22 Ned Fitzgerald
23 P. Fitzgerald
24 Donal O'Neill

==== Dublin ====
- 1 Paddy O'Flaherty
- 2 Denis Mahony (c)
- 3 Jimmy Lavin
- 4 Mick Moylan
- 5 Maurice Whelan
- 6 Jim Crowley
- 7 Nicky Maher
- 8 Séamus McGuinness
- 9 Cathal O'Leary
- 10 Des Ferguson
- 11 Ollie Freaney
- 12 Johnny Boyle
- 13 Pádraig Haughey
- 14 Kevin Heffernan
- 15 Cyril Freaney

Subs used
20 Terry Jennings for S. McGuinness
16 Billy Monks for T. Jennings

Subs not used
17 Norman Allen
18 Seán Manning
19 Jimmy Gray
21 Joe Brennan

Trainer
Peter O'Reilly

== Post-match ==
The Dublin team were permitted to keep the jerseys they had worn.

Though the team lost this final, Heffernan was driven onwards to achieve greater things with Dublin as manager in the 1970s. After leading the team to win the 1976 All-Ireland Senior Football Championship against Kerry, he declared: "I've waited 21 years for this".
