= 1953 All-Ireland Senior Football Championship final =

1953 All-Ireland Football Championship final
- Event: 1953 All-Ireland Senior Football Championship
Kerry	Armagh
0–13 (13)	1–6 (9)
- Date: 27 September 1953
- Venue: Croke Park, Dublin
- Referee: Peter McDermott (Meath)
- Attendance: 86,155

The 1953 All-Ireland Senior Football Championship final was the 66th All-Ireland Final and the deciding match of the 1953 All-Ireland Senior Football Championship, an inter-county Gaelic football tournament for the top teams in Ireland.

== Match ==
=== Summary ===
Mal McEvoy scored an early goal for Armagh, who led by two points after 40 minutes, before Kerry began to pile on the points. Armagh's Bill McCorry missed a penalty and Kerry won by four points.

It was the first of three All-Ireland football titles won by Kerry in the 1950s.

This was also the first championship meeting of Armagh and Kerry.

With just over 90,000 spectators in attendance, some of whom had broken through a gate to gain access, it was the biggest crowd ever witnessed at Croke Park at the time.

The record attendance was beaten in the 1961 All-Ireland Senior Football Championship final when Down beat Offaly before 90,556 fans.

=== Details ===
27 September 1953	Kerry	0–13 – 1–6	Armagh	Croke Park, Dublin
	J. Brosnan (0-4), J. J. Sheehan (0-3), T. Lyne (0-4), T. Ashe (0-1) & J.Lyne (0-1).		M. McEvoy (1-2), G. O'Neill (0-2), J. Cunningham & B. Seeley (0-1).	Attendance: 86,155; Referee: Peter McDermott (Meath)

GK	1	J. Foley
RCB	2	J. Murphy (c)
FB	3	N. Roche
LCB	4	D. Murphy
RHB	5	C. Kennelly
CHB	6	J. Cronin
LHB	7	M. Palmer
MF	8	S. Murphy
MF	9	D. Hanafin
RHF	10	J. Brosnan
CHF	11	J. J. Sheehan
LHF	12	T. Lyne
RCF	13	T. Ashe
FF	14	S. Kelly
LCF	15	J. Lyne
Substitutes:
	16	G. O'Sullivan for D. Hanafin
	17	J. O'Shea
	18	P. Sheehy
	19	B. O'Shea
	20	M. Brosnan

GK	1	E. McMahon
RCB	2	G. Morgan
FB	3	J. Brattan
LCB	4	J. McKnight
RHB	5	F. Kernan
CHB	6	P. O'Neill
LHB	7	S. Quinn (c)
MF	8	M. O'Hanlon
MF	9	M. McEvoy
RHF	10	J. Cunningham
CHF	11	B. Seeley
LHF	12	B. McCorry
RCF	13	P. Campbell
FF	14	A. O'Hagan
LCF	15	G. O'Neill
Substitutes:
	16	G. Wilson for E. McMahon
	17	G. Murphy for G. Wilson
	18	J. O'Hare for S. Quinn
	19	G. McStay
	20	I. Henderson
	21	P. Murphy
	22	P. O'Neill
	23	P. McCreesh
	24	J. McBreen
