= 1954 All-Ireland Senior Football Championship final =

- Event: 1954 All-Ireland Senior Football Championship
Meath	Kerry
1–13 (16)	1–7 (10)
- Date: 26 September 1954
- Venue: Croke Park, Dublin
- Referee: Simon Deignan (Cavan)
- Attendance: 75,276

The 1954 All-Ireland Senior Football Championship final was the 67th All-Ireland Final and the deciding match of the 1954 All-Ireland Senior Football Championship, an inter-county Gaelic football tournament for the top teams in Ireland.

== Match ==
=== Summary ===
Meath won by six points, with Tom Moriarty scoring the goal.

=== Details ===
26 September 1954
Final

Meath	1–13 – 1–7	Kerry
P. Meegan (0–5), T. Monriaty (1–2), B. Smyth (0–3), McDonnll 0–2 & P. McDermott (0–1).		J. J. Sheehan (1–1), J. Brosnan (0–2) & T. Lyne (0–4).

Croke Park, Dublin
Attendance: 75,276
Referee: Simon Deignan (Cavan)

==== Meath ====
- 1 P. McGearty
- 2 M. O'Brien
- 3 P. O'Brien
- 4 K. McConnell
- 5 K. Lenihan
- 6 J. Reilly
- 7 N. Durnin
- 8 P. Connell
- 9 T. O'Brien
- 10 M. Grace
- 11 B. Smyth
- 12 M. McDonnell
- 13 P. Meegan
- 14 T. Moriarty
- 15 P. McDermott (c)

Subs
16 J. Clarke
17 B. Rattigan
18 F. Byrne
19 G. Smith
20 B. Flanagan
21 L. O'Brien
22 P. Ratty
23 R. Mee
24 P. Brady
25 J. Farrell

Trainer
P. Tully

==== Kerry ====
- 1 G. O'Mahony
- 2 M. Palmer
- 3 N. Roche
- 4 D. Murphy
- 5 S. Murphy
- 6 J. Cronin
- 7 C. Kennelly
- 8 J. Dowling (c)
- 9 T. Moriarty
- 10 B. Buckley
- 11 J. J. Sheehan
- 12 P. Sheehy
- 13 J. Brosnan
- 14 S. Kelly
- 15 T. Lyne
