= Jerome O'Shea =

Irish Gaelic footballer (1931–2018)

Personal information
- Native name: Diarmuid Ó Sé (Irish)
- Born: 1931 Cahersiveen, County Kerry, Ireland
- Died: 6 December 2018 (aged 87) Merrion Road, Dublin, Ireland
- Occupation: Economist
- Height: 6 ft 2 in (188 cm)

Sport
- Sport: Gaelic football
- Position: Right corner-back
Clubs
- Years: Club
- St Mary's; South Kerry
Club titles
- Kerry titles: 3
Inter-county
Years	County	Apps (scores)
1950–1961	Kerry	25 (0–00)
Inter-county titles
- Munster titles: 7
- All-Irelands: 3
- NFL: 1

Jerome O'Shea (1931 – 6 December 2018) was an Irish Gaelic footballer who played as a right corner-back for club side St Mary's, divisional side South Kerry, at inter-county level with the Kerry senior football team and at inter-provincial level with Munster. He was the father of Irish rugby union coach and former international rugby player Conor O'Shea.

== Playing career ==
=== Cahersiveen CBS ===
O'Shea first came to prominence as a Gaelic footballer with Cahersiveen CBS. He won back-to-back Dunloe Cup titles in 1946 and 1947 following successive defeats of Tralee CBS.

=== South Kerry ===
On 9 October 1955, O'Shea captained the South Kerry senior team from centre-back in the county final against North Kerry. A last-minute Mick O'Dwyer point secured a draw with the replay taking place three weeks later. A 2–05 to 0–09 victory secured a first County Championship medal for O'Shea.

O'Shea won a second championship medal on 13 October 1956 after a 1–11 to 0–10 defeat of Kerins O'Rahilly's in the final.

Three-in-a-row proved beyond South Kerry, however, the team qualified for a third final in four years on 26 April 1959. A 1–13 to 1–05 defeat of St Brendan's secured a third championship medal for O'Shea.

=== Kerry ===
==== Minor ====
O'Shea first played for Kerry when he was selected for the minor team in 1949. He was a non-playing substitute for the championship campaign, but ended the season with a Munster Championship medal after a 3–04 to 1–05 defeat of Cork in the final.

Eligible for the minor grade again in 1949, O'Shea made his championship debut on 19 June 1949 in a 1–10 to 1–06 defeat of Clare in the Munster Championship at Cusack Park. He later won a second successive provincial winners' medal - his first on the field of play - after a two-point defeat of Cork in the final. On 25 September 1949, O'Shea was at right corner-forward when Kerry suffered a two-point defeat by Armagh in the All-Ireland final.

==== Senior ====
O'Shea made his first appearance for the Kerry senior team on 6 August 1950 in a challenge game against Wexford to mark the official opening of Con Keating Park in Cahirciveen. Just over a year later he linked up with the Kerry senior team again after the team drew with Mayo in the All-Ireland semi-final. O'Shea was invited to take part in a trial game in Tralee and, after impressing the selectors, was invited to take part in collective training with the team in Ballyheigue. After the final trial and team selection he was listed as an official substitute with a strong possibility of coming on during the game. However, O'Shea had played illegally for club side Mitchelstown on the day of the drawn game and had to withdraw from the panel.

On 9 March 1952, O'Shea made his competitive debut for the Kerry senior team in a 1–09 to 1–07 defeat of Mayo in the National Football League. Later that season he made his first Munster Championship appearance in a 0–14 to 1–07 defeat of Waterford.

On 19 July 1953, O'Shea won his first Munster Championship medal after a 2–07 to 2–03 defeat of Cork in the final. In the week leading up to the All-Ireland semi-final against Louth, he was struck down with threatened pleurisy. Donie Murphy took his place for that game and, even though O'Shea had recovered in time for the All-Ireland final, he failed to regain his place on the starting fifteen. In spite of this, he won his first All-Ireland medal as a non-playing substitute after a 0–13 to 1–06 defeat of Armagh.

O'Shea retained his place on the Kerry panel in 1954, however, he found it difficult to break back into the starting fifteen. On 25 July 1954, he won a second Munster Championship medal after being introduced as a substitute for John Cronin in a 4–09 to 2–03 defeat of Cork in the final. O'Shea was later an unused substitute in Kerry's six-point All-Ireland final defeat by Meath.

On 24 July 1955, O'Shea won a third successive Munster Championship medal after a 0–14 to 2–06 defeat of Cork in the final. By this stage he had reestablished himself on the starting fifteen as left corner-back and was selected in that position for the All-Ireland final against Dublin on 25 September 1955. Kerry won by 0–12 to 1-06, with O'Shea averting a late Dublin goal hunt when he plucked the ball out of the Kerry goal two minutes from the end. It was his second All-Ireland medal overall and his first on the field of play.

O'Shea was appointed captain of the Kerry team in 1956 and retained the captaincy in 1957.

On 13 July 1958, O'Shea won a fourth Munster Championship medal after a 2–07 to 0–03 defeat of Cork in the final.

O'Shea won his sole National Football League on 10 May 1959 after a 2–08 to 1–08 defeat of Derry in the final. Later that season he won a fifth Munster Championship medal as Cork were defeated in the final once again. On 27 September 1959, O'Shea won his third and final All-Ireland medal when Kerry defeated Galway by 3–07 to 1–04 in the final.

On 24 July 1960, O'Shea won a sixth Munster Championship medal when Kerry defeated Waterford by 3–15 to 0–08 in the final. He retained the left corner-back position when Kerry faced Down in the All-Ireland final on 25 September 1960. The sides were level early in the second half before Down made the first significant breakthrough with a goal. They eventually won by 2–10 to 0–08 to claim their first ever All-Ireland title.

O'Shea was dropped from the starting fifteen in 1959, however, he won a seventh Munster Championship medal as a non-playing substitute following Kerry's 2–13 to 1–04 defeat of Cork in a Munster final replay. He made his last championship appearance on 6 August 1961 in a 1–12 to 0-09 All-Ireland semi-final defeat by Down. O'Brien retired from inter-county football following this defeat.

== Honours ==
Cahersiveen CBS

- Dunloe Cup (2): 1946, 1947

St Mary's

- South Kerry Senior Football Championship (6): 1947, 1949, 1952, 1954 (c), 1955, 1960

Mitchelstown

- North Cork Junior A Football Championship (1): 1951

Iveragh

- Kerry Intermediate Football Championship (1): 1948

South Kerry

- Kerry Senior Football Championship (3): 1955 (c), 1956, 1958

Kerry

- All-Ireland Senior Football Championship (3): 1953, 1955, 1959
- Munster Senior Football Championship (7): 1953, 1954, 1955, 1958, 1959, 1960, 1961
- National Football League (1): 1958-59
- Munster Minor Football Championship (2): 1948, 1949

Sporting positions
Preceded by John Dowling	Kerry Senior Football Captain; 1956-1957	Succeeded by Mick Murphy
