= Johnny Boyle (Gaelic footballer) =

Irish Gaelic footballer

Personal information
- Native name: Seán Ó Baoill (Irish)
- Born: 1931 Arbour Hill, Dublin, Ireland
- Died: 25 February 2017 (aged 85) Gold Coast, Australia
- Occupation: Aircraft technician
- Height: 5 ft 8 in (173 cm)

Sport
- Sport: Gaelic football
- Position: Right corner-forward
Clubs
- Years: Club
- Air Corps; Clanna Gael
Club titles
- Dublin titles: 0
Inter-county
- Years: County
- 1953–1958: Dublin
Inter-county titles
- Leinster titles: 3
- All-Irelands: 1
- NFL: 3

Johnny Boyle (1931 – 25 February 2017), also known as Seán O'Boyle, was an Irish Gaelic footballer who played for club sides Air Corps and Clanna Gael and at inter-county level with the Dublin senior football team.

== Career ==
Boyle first came to prominence during his schooldays at De La Salle College in Kildare, during which time he served as captain of the Kildare minor team for three years. He subsequently declared for the Dublin senior team and, after making his debut in 1953 against Meath, ended the season with the first of three National League titles. Two years later hBoyle ad secured his first Leinster Championship medal, while he also lined out in the 1955 All-Ireland final defeat by Kerry. He won three provincial titles in total, and played at left wing-back in the 1958 All-Ireland final defeat of Derry.

== Personal life and death ==
Born in Arbour Hill, Boyle's father was a member of the Irish Army who was later transferred to the Curragh. In 1949 Boyle himself enlisted in the Air Corps and spent the following six years at Baldonnell Aerodrome. After working in Dublin for a number of years he emigrated to New Zealand and secured a job with Safe Air as an aircraft technician. Boyle died in the Gold Coast, Australia on 25 February 2017.

== Honours ==
Dublin

- All-Ireland Senior Football Championship: 1958
- Leinster Senior Football Championship: 1953, 1955, 1958
- National Football League: 1952-53, 1954-55, 1957-58
