= St Joseph's, Fairview =

Boys' secondary school in Fairview, Dublin, Ireland

- Scoil Iósaif na Fhionnradharc

Location
- Merville Avenue, Fairview, Dublin; D03 H524; Ireland; 53.363940°N 6.233727°W

Information
- Motto: Deo Duce (Latin: "With God [as our] guide")
- Religious affiliation: Catholic
- Patron saint: Saint Joseph
- Established: 1888
- Principal: Josh Lewis
- Gender: Co-educational
- Age range: 12–19
- Enrollment: approx. 300 (2019)
- Campus type: Urban
- Colours: Blue, white, gold
- Nickname: Joeys
- Website: stjosephsfairview.ie

St Joseph's, Fairview, sometimes St Joseph's C.B.S., and previously St Joseph's Secondary Christian Brothers' School, is a co-educational Catholic secondary school in Fairview, Dublin, Ireland, having been boys-only until 2023. The school was in the patronage of the Irish Christian Brothers; the patron is now the Edmund Rice Schools Trust.

== History ==
=== Early years ===
St Joseph's Christian Brothers' School, Fairview was founded in 1888. It was originally a training school where Christian Brothers learned to teach before moving on to other schools. At this time, it contained only three classrooms and taught junior classes. In 1890, one of the classes was given over to Intermediate Cert level. Br. J.M. Costen became the first headmaster of the school.

By 1906, two extensions led to the original building having two storeys, including a woodwork room and a chemistry lab. At least seventeen past pupils of the school participated in the 1916 Rising.

=== 1930 to 1990 ===
Despite the addition of partitions to classrooms in 1935 and the first extension in forty years in 1946 to the original building, numbers of pupils continued to rise. It was decided in the mid-fifties that a new second-level school building was required - this was completed in 1958. The primary school then occupied the original building.

In 1938, Br. T.M. Ó'Catháin arrived at the school and he established the Leaving Certificate. The first Leaving Cert Class graduated in 1942. The Past Pupils' Union was established in 1956, with attendants of the first dinner including Harry Boland, Br. A.P. Caombhánach and Br. Ó'Catháin.

By 1957, Irish was no longer the only language used to teach in the school and English was used for certain subjects. A new primary school building was constructed in 1964 and blessed by Archbishop McQuaid in 1965. The two other buildings were used by the secondary school, which arrangement continues to the present. In 1966, the school celebrated the 50th Anniversary of the 1916 Rising. Br. Caombhánach oversaw the production of a souvenir publication and research into the former pupils who took part in the Rising.

In 1986, the first lay principal, Mr. Michael Foster, was appointed. Two years later, the school celebrated its centenary by producing an anniversary yearbook (under the direction of Mr. Seamus McGann).

=== 1990 to present ===
A Repeat Leaving Certificate Programme was introduced in 1996 to tackle declining student numbers. From 1998, permission was received to accept girls in the Repeat Programme.

In 2013, St Joseph's celebrated its 125th anniversary by producing an anniversary yearbook, officially opening new classrooms, launching a new website and launching a fund for a new development.

As of 2019, the school had an enrollment of approximately 300.

In 2022, the school was allowed by the Edmund Rice Schools Trust, with sanction from the Department of Education, to enrol female students in the 2023/24 academic years. As such, the school's status changed from 'all-boys' to co-educational.

== Notable alumni ==
- Norman Allen, Gaelic footballer and hurler
- Simon Behan, Gaelic footballer
- Harry Boland, Olympian (basketball)
- Kevin Boland, politician and minister (several portfolios)
- Cyprian Brady, politician
- Royston Brady, politician
- Emmett Brennan, Olympian (boxing)
- Jack Byrne, footballer
- Pat Canavan, Gaelic footballer
- Blackie Coen, Gaelic footballer
- George Colley, politician
- Sean Connolly, a captain in the Irish Citizen Army, and actor.
- Tommy Conroy, Gaelic footballer
- Michael Joe Cosgrave, politician
- John A. Costello, Taoiseach
- Kevin Doherty, professional footballer
- Liam Donnelly, captain of A-company at the Siege of Jadotville, Gaelic footballer and hurler
- Bobby Doyle, Gaelic footballer and hurler
- Noel Drumgoole, hurler
- Des Ferguson, Gaelic footballer
- Liam Ferguson, hurler
- Curtis Fleming, professional footballer
- Des Foley, politician, Gaelic footballer and hurler
- Lar Foley, Gaelic footballer and hurler
- Richie Foran, footballer
- Brendan Gleeson, film and television actor
- Tony Hanahoe, Gaelic footballer and manager
- Charles Haughey, Taoiseach
- Pádraig Haughey, Gaelic footballer
- Eamon Heery, Gaelic footballer
- Kevin Heffernan, Gaelic footballer
- Frank Henderson, captain in the Irish Volunteers.
- Joe Hennon, European Commission spokesman and guitarist
- Tom Humphries, sportswriter
- Peadar Kearney, Irish composer of numerous rebel songs (best known for The Soldier's Song)
- Jimmy Keaveney, Gaelic footballer
- Alan Keely, footballer
- Johnny Joyce, Gaelic footballer
- John Lawlor, Olympian (track and field)
- Gerry Leonard, guitarist
- Ian Macpherson, comedian
- Seamus Martin, academic
- Aonghus McAnally, broadcaster
- Conor McAnally, television director and writer
- Colm McCarthy, economist
- Brian Mooney, professional footballer
- Ken O'Doherty, professional footballer
- Fred O'Donovan, theatre and radio producer
- Gay O'Driscoll, Gaelic footballer
- Lochlainn O'Raifeartaigh, physicist
- Liam Ó Rinn, Irish-language writer and translator (best known for Amhrán na bhFiann)
- George Redmond, convicted public official
- John Teeling, academic and serial entrepreneur
- Eugene Timmons, TD and Lord Mayor
- Marcus Wilson, Gaelic footballer and hurler
- Joe Young, Gaelic footballer, hurler and army officer

== Notable faculty ==
- Cyril Farrell, hurling manager
- Albert Folens, educational publisher
