= Dinny O'Shea =

Irish Gaelic footballer

Personal information
- Native name: Donncha Ó Sé (Irish)
- Born: April 1932 Camp, County Kerry, Ireland
- Died: 22 June 2010 (aged 78) Tralee, County Kerry, Ireland
- Occupation: Bus driver
- Height: 5 ft 10 in (178 cm)

Sport
- Sport: Gaelic football
- Position: Midfield
Clubs
- Years: Club
- Camp; Kerins O'Rahilly's
Club titles
- Kerry titles: 3
Inter-county
Years	County	Apps (scores)
1955-1959	Kerry	9 (1-00)
Inter-county titles
- Munster titles: 2
- All-Irelands: 1
- NFL: 1

Denis O'Shea (April 1932 – 22 June 2010) was an Irish Gaelic footballer who played for club sides Camp and Kerins O'Rahilly's and at inter-county level with the Kerry senior football team.

== Career ==
O'Shea first played Gaelic football at club level with Camp before transferring to the Kerins O'Rahilly's, with whom he won three Kerry Senior Football Championship titles between 1953 and 1957. He first appeared on the inter-county scene with the Kerry junior team in 1955 before immediately being drafted onto the senior team. O'Shea won the first of two provincial championship medals that year before ending the season with an All-Ireland title after lining out at midfield in the defeat of Dublin in the 1955 All-Ireland final. He ended his career by claiming a National League title in 1959.

== Honours ==
Kerins O'Rahilly's

- Kerry Senior Football Championship: 1953, 1954, 1957

Kerry

- All-Ireland Senior Football Championship: 1955
- Leinster Senior Football Championship: 1955, 1958
- National Football League: 1958-59
