= Paddy O'Flaherty (Gaelic footballer) =

Irish Gaelic footballer

Personal information
- Native name: Pádraig Ó Flatharta (Irish)
- Born: 1933 (age 92–93) Sutton, County Dublin, Ireland
- Height: 5 ft 11 in (180 cm)

Sport
- Sport: Gaelic football
- Position: Goalkeeper
Club
- Years: Club
- Beann Eadair
Club titles
- Dublin titles: 0
Inter-county
- Years: County
- 1954-1959: Dublin
Inter-county titles
- Leinster titles: 3
- All-Irelands: 1
- NFL: 2

Paddy O'Flaherty (born 1933) is an Irish retired Gaelic footballer who played for club side Beann Eadair and at inter-county level with the Dublin senior football team.

== Career ==
A member of the Beann Eadair club, O'Flaherty first came to prominence in 1954 when he was drafted onto the Dublin senior team. Within 12 months he had secured his first Leinster Championship medal, while he also lined out in the 1955 All-Ireland final defeat by Kerry. O'Flaherty won three provincial titles in total and lined out in goal for Dublin's 1958 All-Ireland final defeat of Derry.

== Honours ==
Dublin

- All-Ireland Senior Football Championship: 1958
- Leinster Senior Football Championship: 1955, 1958, 1959
- National Football League: 1954-55, 1957-58
