= Jim Crowley (Gaelic footballer) =

Irish Gaelic footballer (1930–2024)

Personal information
- Native name: Séamus Ó Crualaoich (Irish)
- Born: 1930 New York City, U.S.
- Died: 22 August 2024 (aged 94) Dublin, Ireland
- Occupation: Corporation official
- Height: 6 ft 1 in (185 cm)

Sport
- Sport: Gaelic football
- Position: Centre-back
Club
- Years: Club
- St. Vincent's
Inter-county
- Years: County
- 1953–1959: Dublin
Inter-county titles
- Leinster titles: 3
- All-Irelands: 1
- NFL: 3

James Crowley (1930 – 22 August 2024) was an Irish Gaelic footballer who played for club side St. Vincent's and at inter-county level with the Dublin senior football team.

== Career ==
A member of the St. Vincent's club, Crowley first came to prominence in 1947 when he was selected for the Leinster Colleges and Dublin minor teams. He subsequently broke onto the senior side and enjoyed his first success in 1953 when he won the first of three National League medals. Two years later Crowley had secured his first Leinster Championship medal, while he also lined out in the 1955 All-Ireland final defeat by Kerry. He won three provincial titles in total and lined out at centre-back in Dublin's 1958 All-Ireland final defeat of Derry.

== Death ==
Crowley died in Dublin on 22 August 2024, at the age of 94.

== Honours ==
Dublin

- All-Ireland Senior Football Championship: 1958
- Leinster Senior Football Championship: 1955, 1958, 1959
- National Football League: 1952-53, 1954-55, 1957-58
