= Séamus McGuinness =

Irish Gaelic footballer

Personal information
- Nickname: Jim
- Born: 1930 Rush, County Dublin, Ireland
- Died: 6 January 2008 (aged 77) Rush, County Dublin, Ireland

Sport
- Sport: Gaelic football
- Position: Midfield
Club
- Years: Club
- 1946–1960: St Maur's
Club titles
- Dublin titles: 0
Inter-county
- Years: County
- 1950–1958: Dublin
Inter-county titles
- Leinster titles: 1
- All-Irelands: 0
- NFL: 1

Séamus "Jim" McGuinness (1930 – 6 January 2008) was an Irish Gaelic footballer whose league and championship career at senior level with the Dublin county team spanned eight seasons from 1950 to 1958.

McGuinness made his debut on the inter-county scene at the age of nineteen when he was selected for the Dublin junior team. He played one championship season with the junior team, culminating with the winning of a Leinster medal in 1949. McGuinness subsequently joined the Dublin senior team during the 1950–51 league. During his career he won one Leinster medal and one National Football League medal. He retired from inter-county football due to injury in 1958.

He was not fully fit on the day of the 1955 All-Ireland Senior Football Championship Final.

== Honours ==
St Maur's

- Dublin Junior Football Championship (1): 1951

Dublin

- Leinster Senior Football Championship (1): 1955
- National Football League (1): 1954–55
- Leinster Junior Football Championship (1): 1949
