= John Joe O'Hagan =

Gaelic footballer and manager (1930–2021)

John Joseph O'Hagan
Personal information
- Native name: Seán Seosamh Ó hÁgáin (Irish)
- Nickname: John Joe O'Hagan
- Born: 1930 Coalisland, County Tyrone, Northern Ireland
- Died: 2 November 2021 (aged 91) Portadown, County Armagh, Northern Ireland

Sport
- Sport: Gaelic football
- Position: Left wing-back
Club
- Years: Club
- Clonoe O'Rahilly's
Club titles
- Tyrone titles: 5
Inter-county
- Years: County
- Tyrone
Inter-county titles
- Ulster titles: 2
- All-Irelands: 0
- NFL: 0

John Joseph O'Hagan (1930 – 2 November 2021) was a Gaelic football player and manager from Northern Ireland who played for club side Clonoe O'Rahilly's and at inter-county level with the Tyrone senior football team.

== Career ==
Born in Coalisland, O'Hagan was a Gaelic footballer with nearby Clonoe O'Rahilly's GAC, with whom he won five Tyrone Senior Football Championship medals. A member of the Tyrone minor team that won the county’s first ever All-Ireland title in 1947, he helped the team to win another at this level in 1948. O'Hagan went on to share in the county’s breakthrough Ulster Championship senior wins in 1956 and 1957. When he retired from playing, he took up coaching and guided the Eglish St Patrick's club to the Tyrone Senior Championship title in 1970, their only title to date.

== Personal life and death ==
His son, Damien O'Hagan, played at minor, under-21 and senior level for Tyrone, winning three Ulster senior medals and an All-Star award in 1986.

O'Hagan died at the Craigavon Area Hospital on 2 November 2021.

== Honours ==
Clonoe O'Rahilly's

- Tyrone Senior Football Championship: 1958, 1959, 1960, 1964, 1965

Tyrone

- Ulster Senior Football Championship: 1956, 1957
- All-Ireland Minor Football Championship: 1947, 1948
- Ulster Minor Football Championship: 1947, 1948
