= Mick Murphy (Gaelic footballer) =

Irish Gaelic footballer

Personal information
- Native name: Mícheál Ó Murchú (Irish)
- Born: 1931 Ventry, County Kerry, Ireland
- Died: 21 February 2009 (aged 77) Tralee, County Kerry, Ireland
- Occupation: Primary school teacher
- Height: 5 ft 10 in (178 cm)

Sport
- Sport: Gaelic football
- Position: Full-back
Clubs
- Years: Club
- Dingle; Geralines; Kerins O'Rahilly's
Club titles
- Kerry titles: 1
Inter-county
| Years | County | Apps (scores) |
| 1953-1958 | Kerry | 9 (3-04) |
Inter-county titles
- Munster titles: 3
- All-Irelands: 2
- NFL: 0

Michael Murphy (1931 – 21 February 2009), known as Mícheál Ó Murchú, was an Irish Gaelic footballer who played for club sides Dingle, Geraldines and Kerins O'Rahilly's and at inter-county level with the Kerry senior football team.

== Career ==
Born in Ventry, County Kerry, Murphy first came to prominence on the Coláiste Íosagáin team that won the Corn Uí Mhuirí title in 1949. After beginning his club career with Dingle, he later lined out with the Geraldines club in Dublin, before winning a County Championship title with Kerins O'Rahilly's in Tralee. Murphy earned a call-up to the Kerry senior football team in 1953 and was a substitute on the team that defeated Armagh in the 1953 All-Ireland final, however, he was one of a number of players who didn't receive a winners' medal. He subsequently became a regular member of the starting fifteen and was at full-forward for Kerry's defeat of Dublin in the 1955 All-Ireland final. Murphy ended his career by winning a third Munster Championship medal as team captain in 1959.

== Honours ==
Coláiste Íosagáin

- Corn Uí Mhuirí: 1949

Kerry

- All-Ireland Senior Football Championship: 1953, 1955
- Leinster Senior Football Championship: 1953, 1955, 1958 (c)

Sporting positions
| Preceded by | Kerry Senior Football Captain; 1958 | Succeeded by Mick O'Connell |
