= Marcus Wilson (Gaelic footballer) =

Irish Gaelic footballer (1932–2023)

Personal information
- Native name: Marcas Mac Liam (Irish)
- Nickname: Junior
- Born: 1932 Fairview, Dublin, Ireland
- Died: 22 March 2023 (aged 91) Blanchardstown, Dublin, Ireland
- Occupation: Company director
- Height: 6 ft 0 in (183 cm)

Sport
- Sport: Gaelic football
- Position: Full-back
Club
- Years: Club
- St. Vincent's
Club titles
	Football	Hurling
Dublin titles	9	4
Inter-county
- Years: County
- 1953-1958: Dublin
Inter-county titles
- Leinster titles: 1
- All-Irelands: 1
- NFL: 3

Marcus Wilson (1932 – 22 March 2023) was an Irish Gaelic footballer and hurler. At club level, he played with St. Vincent's and was also a member of the Dublin senior teams as a dual player.

== Career ==
Wilson first played Gaelic football and hurling as a schoolboy at St. Joseph's CBS in Fairview. His performances in the various schools' competitions earned his inclusion on the Leinsterurling team that won the All-Ireland colleges' title in 1949. Wilson subsequently joined the St. Vincent's club and won nine Dublin SFC titles and four Dublin SHC titles during a golden age for the club.

Wilson first appeared on the inter-county scene as sub-goalkeeper on the Dublin minor football team that won the Leinster MFC title in 1949. He became a dual player at senior level and was a substitute on the Dublin senior hurling team that lost to Cork in the 1952 All-Ireland final, having earlier won a Leinster SHC title. Wilson later won three National League titles with the Dublin senior football team and was at full-back when Derry were beaten in the 1958 All-Ireland final.

== Personal life and death ==
One of four children born to Marcus Wilson, a veteran of the 1916 Easter Rising who later had a career in the Defence Forces, Wilson was educated at St. Joseph's CBS in Fairview. He later became managing director of Heritage Tours Ltd.

Wilson died at St. Francis Hospice in Blanchardstown on 22 March 2023, at the age of 91.

== Honours ==
St. Vincent's

- Dublin Senior Hurling Championship: 1953, 1954. 1955, 1957
- Dublin Senior Football Championship: 1951, 1952, 1953, 1954, 1955, 1957, 1958, 1959, 1960

Dublin

- All-Ireland Senior Football Championship: 1958
- Leinster Senior Football Championship: 1958
- Leinster Senior Hurling Championship: 1952
- National Football League: 1952-53, 1954-55, 1957-58
- Leinster Minor Football Championship: 1949

Leinster

- All-Ireland Colleges' Senior Hurling Championship: 1949
