= Ned Roche =

Irish Gaelic footballer

Personal information
- Native name: Éamonn de Róiste (Irish)
- Nickname: Ned
- Born: 1929 Knocknagoshel, County Kerry, Ireland
- Died: 11 October 2004 (aged 75) Wilton, Cork, Ireland
- Occupation: Army officer
- Height: 6 ft 0 in (183 cm)

Sport
- Sport: Gaelic football
- Position: Full-back
Clubs
- Years: Club
- Clonmel Commercials; Knocknagoshel
Club titles
- Kerry titles: 0
Inter-county
Years	County	Apps (scores)
1952 1953-1958	Tipperary; Kerry	20 (0-00)
Inter-county titles
- Munster titles: 4
- All-Irelands: 2
- NFL: 0

Edmond Roche (1929 – 11 October 2004), known as Ned Roche, was an Irish Gaelic footballer who played for club sides Clonmel Commercials and Knocknagoshel and at inter-county level with the Tipperary and Kerry senior football teams.

== Career ==
Roche first played Gaelic football at club level with Knocknagoshel before transferring to the Clonmel Commercials club. His performances with the latter resulted in a call-up to the Tipperary senior football team, however, he declared for the Kerry senior football team in advance of the 1953 Munster Championship. Roche won the first of four provincial championship medals that year before ending the season with an All-Ireland title after a defeat of Armagh in the final. After defeat by Meath in the 1954 All-Ireland final, he claimed a second winners' medal after lining out at full-back in Kerry's defeat of Dublin in the 1955 All-Ireland final.

== Honours ==
Kerry

- All-Ireland Senior Football Championship: 1955
- Leinster Senior Football Championship: 1954, 1955, 1958
