= Armagh–Kerry Gaelic football rivalry =

Rivalry between Irish football teams

Armagh-Kerry
- Location: County Armagh; County Kerry
- Teams: Armagh; Kerry
- First meeting: Kerry 0-13 - 1-6 Armagh; 1953 All-Ireland final (27 September 1953)
- Latest meeting: Kerry 4-18 - 0-17 Armagh; 2026 All-Ireland qualifiers (20 June 2026)

Statistics
- Total meetings: 9
- All-time series: Kerry 6-1-2 Armagh

The Armagh-Kerry rivalry is a Gaelic football rivalry between Irish county teams Kerry and Armagh, who first played each other in 1953. It is a rivalry which reached its height during the first decade of the 21st century. Armagh's home ground is the Athletic Grounds and Kerry's home ground is Fitzgerald Stadium, however, all of their championship meetings have been held at neutral venues, usually Croke Park.

While Kerry have the highest number of Munster titles and Armagh are fifth on the roll of honour in Ulster, they have also enjoyed success in the All-Ireland Senior Football Championship, having won 41 championship titles between them to date.

== All-time results ==
=== Legend ===
Kerry win
Armagh win
Match was a draw

=== Senior ===
No.	Date	Winners	Score	Runners-up	Venue	Stage
1.	27 September 1953	Kerry	0-13 - 1-6	Armagh	Croke Park	All Ireland final
2.	15 August 1982	Kerry	3-15 - 1-11	Armagh	Croke Park	All Ireland semi-final
3.	20 August 2000	Kerry	2-11 - 2-11	Armagh	Croke Park	All Ireland semi-final
4.	2 September 2000	Kerry	2-15 - 1-15	Armagh	Croke Park	All Ireland semi-final replay
5.	22 September 2002	Armagh	1-12 - 0-14	Kerry	Croke Park	All Ireland final
6.	5 August 2006	Kerry	3-15 - 1-13	Armagh	Croke Park	All Ireland quarter-final
7.	13 July 2024	Armagh	1-18 - 1-16	Kerry	Croke Park	All Ireland semi-final
8.	29 June 2025	Kerry	0-32 - 1-21	Armagh	Croke Park	All Ireland quarter-final
8.	21 June 2026	Kerry	4-18 - 0-17	Armagh	Fitzgerald Stadium	All-Ireland qualifiers
