= Garry O'Mahony =

Irish Gaelic footballer

Personal information
- Native name: Gearóid Ó Mathúna (Irish)
- Born: 1933 Tralee, County Kerry, Ireland
- Died: 24 October 2011 (aged 78) Tralee, County Kerry, Ireland
- Occupation: Garage assistant
- Height: 5 ft 8 in (173 cm)

Sport
- Sport: Gaelic football
- Position: Goalkeeper
Club
- Years: Club
- John Mitchels
Club titles
- Kerry titles: 2
Inter-county
Years	County	Apps (scores)
1953-1956	Kerry	7 (0-00)
Inter-county titles
- Munster titles: 2
- All-Irelands: 1
- NFL: 0

Garry O'Mahony (29 February 1933 – 24 October 2011) was an Irish Gaelic footballer who played for club side John Mitchels and at inter-county level with the Kerry senior football team.

== Career ==
A member of the John Mitchels club, in Tralee, O'Mahony won his first County Championship title in 1952 before claiming a second title in 1959. He first played for the Kerry senior football team during the 1953-54 league and succeeded in displacing Johnny Foley as the first-choice goalkeeper. O'Mahony won the first of back-to-back Munster Championship medals in 1954 and, after defeat by Meath in the 1954 All-Ireland final, claimed a winners' medal after lining out in goal in Kerry's defeat of Dublin in the 1955 All-Ireland final. He retained his position in goal for the opening round of the 1956 Munster Championship but lost his place to Donal Marcus O'Neill later that year.

== Honours ==
John Mitchels

- Kerry Senior Football Championship: 1952, 1959

Kerry

- All-Ireland Senior Football Championship: 1955
- Leinster Senior Football Championship: 1954, 1955
