= Des Ferguson =

Gaelic football player (1930–2021)

Personal information
- Native name: Deasún Mac Fheargusa (Irish)
- Nickname: Snitchy
- Born: 1930 County Down, Northern Ireland
- Died: 2 November 2021 (aged 91) Kells, County Meath, Ireland
- Occupation: Secondary school teacher
- Height: 5 ft 8 in (173 cm)

Sport
- Football Position: Left wing-forward
- Hurling Position: Right wing-back
Clubs
- Years: Club
- St Vincent's; Gaeil Colmcille
Club titles
- Dublin titles: 12 Football 8 Hurling
Inter-county
- Years: County
- 1950–1964: Dublin
Inter-county titles
	Football	Hurling
Leinster Titles	4	2
All-Ireland Titles	2	0
League titles	3	0

Desmond Ferguson (1930 – 2 November 2021) was a Gaelic footballer who played for the Dublin county team. He played his club football and with St Vincents. He won the All-Ireland Senior Football Championship with Dublin in 1958 and 1963. He moved to Meath and began playing with Gaeil Colmcille winning Meath Senior Football Championship titles with them in 1966 and 1968.

His death was announced on 2 November 2021.

== Honours ==
Gaeil Cholmcille

- Meath Senior Football Championship: 1966, 1968

Dublin

- All-Ireland Senior Football Championship: 1958, 1963
- Leinster Senior Football Championship: 1955, 1958, 1959, 1963
- Leinster Senior Hurling Championship: 1952, 1961
- National Football League: 1952–53, 1954–55, 1957–58
- Leinster Minor Football Championship: 1948
- Dublin Senior Football Championship: 1949, 1950, 1951, 1952, 1953, 1954,1955, 1957, 1958, 1959, 1960, 1961, 1962, 1963, 1964, 1966 & 1967
- Dublin Senior Hurling Championship: 1953, 1954. 1955, 1957, 1960, 1962, 1964 & 1967
