= Jimmy Lavin =

Irish Gaelic footballer (1928–2020)

Personal information
- Native name: Séamus Ó Maoiléimhín (Irish)
- Born: 1928 Dublin, Ireland
- Died: 5 September 2020 (aged 92) Dublin, Ireland
- Occupation: Shopkeeper
- Height: 6 ft 0 in (183 cm)

Sport
- Sport: Gaelic football
- Position: Full-back
Club
- Years: Club
- St Vincent's
Club titles
- Dublin titles: 10
Inter-county
- Years: County
- 1949–1957: Dublin
Inter-county titles
- Leinster titles: 1
- All-Irelands: 0
- NFL: 2

James Lavin (1928 – 5 September 2020) was an Irish Gaelic footballer and hurler. At club level he played with the St Vincent's club and was a two-time National League winner at senior level with the Dublin county football team.

== Playing career ==
Born in Dublin, Lavin was educated at O'Connell Schools, with whom he also played in the Dr. Croke Cup against St Flannan's College in 1946. By that stage he had also joined the Dublin minor team as a dual player, winning back-to-back All-Ireland Championships as a hurler in 1945 and as a footballer in 1946. After a spell with the Dublin junior football team, Lavin was drafted onto the senior team in 1949. Over the following eight years he won two National Football League medals and a Leinster Championship medal. Lavin also played club football with St Vincent's and won ten Dublin County Championships between 1949 and 1959.

== Honours ==
St Vincent's

- Dublin Senior Football Championship (10): 1949, 1950, 1951, 1952, 1953, 1954, 1955, 1957, 1958, 1959

Dublin

- Leinster Senior Football Championship (1): 1955
- National League (2): 1952-53, 1954-55
