= Liam Ferguson =

Irish hurler (1940–2026)

Personal information
- Native name: Liam Mac Fheargusa (Irish)
- Born: June 1940 Marino, Dublin, Ireland
- Died: 21 May 2026 (aged 85) Dunsany, County Meath, Ireland
- Height: 5 ft 10 in (178 cm)

Sport
- Sport: Hurling
- Position: Right wing-back
Club
- Years: Club
- St. Vincent's
Club titles
- Dublin titles: 4
Inter-county
- Years: County
- 1960-1962: Dublin
Inter-county titles
- Leinster titles: 1
- All-Irelands: 0
- NHL: 0

Liam Ferguson (June 1940 – 21 May 2026) was an Irish hurler who played as a right wing-back for club side St. Vincent's and at inter-county level with the Dublin senior hurling team.

== Playing career ==
Ferguson attended St Joseph's CBS in Fairview and played in all grades of hurling and Gaelic football during his time there. He won Leinster Junior Colleges titles in both codes in 1955, as well as lining out with the college's senior team in the Leinster Colleges SHC.

At club level, Ferguson played as a dual player with the St Vincent's club in Marino. In his underage years, he won Dublin MFC and Dublin MHC medals. Ferguson later progressed to adult levels and won Dublin JHC and Dublin SHC medals. He also won Dublin SFC honours.

He made debut with the Dublin senior hurling team during their Walsh Cup-winning campaign in 1960. Ferguson also made a number of appearances for the Dublin senior football team. He won a Leinster SHC medal, alongside his brother Des, in July 1961. Ferguson was at wing-back for the one-point defeat by Tipperary in the 1961 All-Ireland SHC final.

== Deaths ==
Ferguson died on 21 May 2026, at the age of 85.

== Honours ==
St Joseph's CBS

- Leinster Colleges Junior Hurling Championship (1): 1955
- Leinster Colleges Junior Football Championship (1): 1955

St Vincent's

- Dublin Senior Hurling Championship (4): 1960, 1962, 1964, 1967
- Dublin Junior Hurling Championship (1): 1957
- Dublin Minor Football Championship (1): 1958
- Dublin Minor Hurling Championship (1): 1957

Dublin

- Leinster Senior Hurling Championship (1): 1961
- Walsh Cup (1): 1960
