= Norman Allen =

Norman Allen may refer to:

- Norman Allen (dual player) (1928–2021), Irish hurler and Gaelic footballer
- Norman M. Allen (1828–1909), American politician from New York
- Norman Percy Allen (1903–1972), British metallurgist

== See also ==
- Norman Allan (1909–1977), commissioner of the New South Wales Police Force
