= Tom Moriarty (Gaelic footballer) =

Irish Gaelic footballer

Personal information
- Native name: Tomás Ó Muireartaigh (Irish)
- Born: 1928 Castlegregory, Ireland
- Died: 16 January 2002 (aged 73) Galway, Ireland
- Occupation: Bank official
- Height: 6 ft 1 in (185 cm)

Sport
- Sport: Gaelic football
- Position: Midfield
Clubs
- Years: Club
- 1944–1946 1947 1948–1958: Austin Stacks; Dohenys; Clonakilty
Club titles
- Cork titles: 1
Inter-county*
Years	County	Apps (scores)
1948–1949 1951–1952 1953–1958	Kerry; Cork; Kerry	1 (0–00); 3 (2–03); 14 (0–03)
Inter-county titles
- Munster titles: 4
- All-Irelands: 1
- NFL: 1
- *Inter County team apps and scores correct as of 15:36, 18 September 2021.

Thomas Moriarty (1928 – 16 January 2002) was an Irish Gaelic footballer. At club level he played with Austin Stacks, Dohenys and Clonakilty and was a member of the Cork and Kerry senior football teams. Moriarty usually lined out as a midfielder.

== Career ==
Moriarty first came to Gaelic football prominence as a student with Tralee CBS, winning consecutive Corn Uí Mhuirí titles in 1944 and 1945. By this stage he had already begun his adult club career with the Austin Stacks club. His occupation as a bank official resulted in him joining lining out with a number of clubs, firstly with Dohenys in Dunmanway and later with Clonakilty. He captained the latter to a County Championship success in 1952. Moriarty first appeared on the inter-county scene as captain of the Kerry minor football team that won the All-Ireland Minor Championship in 1946. He was drafted onto the Kerry senior football team in 1949 but later won an All-Ireland Junior Championship title with Cork in 1951. This success resulted in his elevation to the senior team and he won National League and Munster Championship titles in 1952. Moriarty declared for Kerry in February 1953, however, he was later served with a 12-month suspension for lining out in a rugby game. He resumed his position on the Kerry team the following year and won three Munster Championship titles in five seasons as well as an All-Ireland Championship title in 1955. Moriarty's career was brought to a premature end when he broke his leg during the 1958 All-Ireland semi-final defeat by Derry.

== Personal life and death ==
Born in Cappagh, Castlegregory, Moriarty began his banking career with AIB in Dunmanway, before progressing through the ranks in Clonakilty and Cork city. He was then chosen on a specialist team to set up the British operations of AIB. Moriarty returned to Cork for a period before taking up the position of manager of the Castle Street branch of AIB in Tralee in the early 1970s. He was appointed Regional Manager for Kerry in 1975 and, six years later, was appointed General Manager West, based in Galway. He retired in 1988.

Moriarty died on 16 January 2002, aged 73.

== Honours ==
Tralee CBS

- Corn Uí Mhuirí: 1944, 1945

Clonakilty

- Cork Senior Football Championship: 1952 (c)

Cork

- Munster Senior Football Championship: 1952
- National Football League: 1951-52
- All-Ireland Junior Football Championship: 1951
- Munster Junior Football Championship: 1951

Kerry

- All-Ireland Senior Football Championship: 1955
- Munster Senior Football Championship: 1954, 1955, 1958
- All-Ireland Minor Football Championship: 1946 (c)
- Munster Minor Football Championship: 1945, 1946 (c)

Munster

- All-Ireland Inter-Provincial Colleges Football Championship: 1947 (c)

Achievements
Preceded by Seán McEntaggart	All-Ireland Minor Football Final winning captain 1946	Succeeded by Eddie Devlin
