= Bobby Buckley =

Irish Gaelic footballer

Personal information
- Native name: Riobeard Ó Buachalla (Irish)
- Born: 20 April 1931 Listowel, County Kerry, Ireland
- Died: 6 March 2013 (aged 81) Ballyheigue, County Kerry, Ireland
- Occupation: Education executive
- Height: 5 ft 10 in (178 cm)

Sport
- Sport: Gaelic football
- Position: Centre-forward
Clubs
- Years: Club
- Clounmacon; St Brendan's; Kenmare Shamrocks
Club titles
- Kerry titles: 0
College
- Years: College
- University College Cork
College titles
- Sigerson titles: 1
Inter-county
Years	County	Apps (scores)
1953-1958	Kerry	12 (3-01)
Inter-county titles
- Munster titles: 3
- All-Irelands: 1
- NFL: 0

Robert Buckley (20 April 1931 – 6 March 2013), known as Bobby Buckley, was an Irish Gaelic footballer who played for club sides Clounmacon and Kenmare Shamrocks and at inter-county level with the Kerry senior football team.

== Career ==
Buckley first played Gaelic football with the local Clounmacon club. He first came to prominence when he lined out for the University College Cork team that won the Sigerson Cup in 1953. This success opened the door for Buckley to line out with the Kerry senior football team and he made his debut during the 1953 Munster Championship. He won the first of three successive provincial championship medals that year. After defeat by Meath in the 1954 All-Ireland final, Buckley claimed a winners' medal after lining out as a substitute in Kerry's defeat of Dublin in the 1955 All-Ireland final.

== Honours ==
University College Cork

- Sigerson Cup: 1953

Kerry

- All-Ireland Senior Football Championship: 1955
- Leinster Senior Football Championship: 1953, 1954, 1955
