= Johnny Foley =

Kerry Gaelic footballer

Personal information
- Native name: Seán Ó Foghlú (Irish)
- Born: 1931 (age 94–95) Tralee, County Kerry, Ireland
- Occupations: Painter and decorator
- Height: 5 ft 8 in (173 cm)

Sport
- Sport: Gaelic football
- Position: Goalkeeper
Club
- Years: Club
- Kerins O'Rahilly's
Club titles
- Kerry titles: 2
Inter-county
Years	County	Apps (scores)
1953	Kerry	2 (0-00)
Inter-county titles
- Munster titles: 1
- All-Irelands: 1
- NFL: 0

John Foley (born 1931) is an Irish former Gaelic footballer. At club level, he played with Kerins O'Rahilly's and at inter-county level with the Kerry senior football team.

== Career ==
Foley played Gaelic football at club level with the Kerins O'Rahilly's club in Tralee. He progressed to adult level and won consecutive Kerry SFC medals in 1953 and 1954. Foley later lined out with the St Mary's club in London.

At inter-county level, Foey first played for Kerry as a member of the minor team in 1947. His three successive years in that grade yielded two Munster MFC medals, however, there were also two All-Ireland MFC final defeats. Foley later progressed to the junior team, before being called up to the senior team midway during the 1953 season. He lined out in goal when Kerry beat Armagh by 0-13 to 1-06 in the 1953 All-Ireland final.

== Honours ==
Kerins O'Rahilly's

- Kerry Senior Football Championship: 1953, 1954

Kerry

- All-Ireland Senior Football Championship: 1953
- Munster Senior Football Championship: 1953
- Munster Minor Football Championship: 1947, 1949
