= Seán Murray =

Dublin Gaelic footballer

Personal information
- Native name: Seán Ó Muirí (Irish)
- Nickname: Yank
- Born: 1932 Skerries, County Dublin, Ireland
- Died: 27 July 2012 (aged 80) Skerries, County Dublin, Ireland
- Occupation: Civil servant
- Height: 6 ft 1 in (185 cm)

Sport
- Sport: Gaelic football
- Position: Midfield
Club
- Years: Club
- Skerries Harps
Club titles
- Dublin titles: 0
Inter-county
- Years: County
- 1956–1958: Dublin
Inter-county titles
- Leinster titles: 1
- All-Irelands: 1
- NFL: 1

Seán Murray (1932 – 17 July 2012) was an Irish Gaelic footballer who played for club side Skerries Harps and at inter-county level with the Dublin senior team.

== Career ==
Murray first came to prominence with the Skerries Harps club that secured senior status after winning the junior title in 1953 and the intermediate title in 1954. He first appeared on the inter-county scene as a member of the Dublin junior team that secured the Leinster Junior Championship title in 1955. Murray made his senior debut in a tournament game the following year and had his most successful season in 1958 when he claimed National League and Leinster Championship titles. He also lined out at midfield in the 1958 All-Ireland final defeat of Derry. Two years later, Murray collected an All-Ireland title with the Dublin junior team.

== Honours ==
Skerries Harps

- Dublin Intermediate Football Championship: 1954
- Dublin Junior Football Championship: 1953

Dublin

- All-Ireland Senior Football Championship: 1958
- Leinster Senior Football Championship: 1958
- National Football League: 1957-58
- All-Ireland Junior Football Championship: 1960
- Leinster Junior Football Championship: 1955, 1960
