= Armagh–Roscommon Gaelic football rivalry =

Armagh-Roscommon
- Location: County Armagh; County Roscommon
- Teams: Armagh; Roscommon
- First meeting: 1953
- Latest meeting: 2024

Statistics
- Total meetings: 7
- Most wins: Armagh (5)
- Largest victory: 6 points (Roscommon - 1980); 6 points (Armagh - 2024)

The Armagh–Roscommon Gaelic football rivalry stretches back to 1953 in championship football when the counties met for the first time in the All-Ireland Senior Football Championship.

== Championship meetings ==
=== As Provincial Champions ===
Despite winning the second ever Ulster Senior Football Championship, Armagh were infrequent winners of the competition, which was dominated by Cavan and Monaghan in the first half of the twentieth century. Likewise, Roscommon went without a provincial title for 38 years between 1915 and 1943.

The counties’ first championship encounter came in the 1953 All-Ireland semi-final, which Armagh won on a scoreline of 0–8 to 0–7.

Armagh would not have another provincial title until 1977, when they once again met Roscommon at the semi-final stage of the competition. The first game was drawn 3–9 to 2–12 with Armagh winning the replay a fortnight later again by a single point on a scoreline of 0–15 to 0–14.

The sides would meet three years later in the 1980 semi-final, this time Roscommon winning 2–20 to 3–11.

=== Qualifier Era ===
Armagh and Roscommon met in Round 3 of the All-Ireland Qualifiers in 2014, having both been eliminated at the semi-final stage of their respective provincial championships. Armagh won the game by 1–17 to 1–12.

They met again in 2018 in Round 4 of the qualifiers at Portlaoise, Roscommon winning on this occasion by 2–22 to 1–19.

=== Current format ===
The most recent encounter was in the 2024 All-Ireland Senior Football Championship, which Armagh went on to win, eliminating Roscommon at the quarter-final stage by 2–12 to 0–12.

== 1982 American Tour ==
Armagh and Roscommon embarked on a tour of the United States in the autumn of 1982 playing three games at Gaelic Park in New York, Archbishop Riordan High School in San Francisco and Downey, California.

With one win apiece and the aggregate score level, Roscommon were awarded the Lefty Devine Memorial Cup on their number of scores.

== All time results ==
=== Championship ===
Armagh win
Roscommon win
Drawn game

=== Senior ===
No.	Date	Winners	Score	Runners-up	Venue	Stage
1.	9 August 1953	Armagh	0–8 – 0–7	Roscommon	Croke Park	All-Ireland Semi-Final
2.	14 August 1977	Armagh	3–9 – 2–12	Roscommon	Croke Park	All-Ireland Semi-Final
3.	28 August 1977	Armagh	0–15 – 0–14	Roscommon	Croke Park	All-Ireland Semi-Final Replay
4.	10 August 1980	Roscommon	2–20 – 3–11	Armagh	Croke Park	All-Ireland Semi-Final
5.	19 July 2014	Armagh	1–17 – 1–12	Roscommon	O'Moore Park	All-Ireland Qualifires Round 3
6.	7 July 2018	Roscommmon	2–22 – 1–19	Armagh	O'Moore Park	All-Ireland Qualifires Round 4
7.	29 June 2024	Armagh	2–12 – 0–12	Roscommon	Croke Park	All-Ireland Quarter-Final
