= Jack Brattan =

Armagh Gaelic footballer

Jack Brattan (1931 – 25 August 2010) was a Gaelic footballer. He played as a full-back at club level with Armagh Harps, at inter-county level with Armagh and at inter-provincial level with Ulster.

== Honours ==
Armagh Harps

- Armagh Senior Football Championship (4): 1952, 1955, 1957, 1958

Armagh

- Ulster Senior Football Championship (2): 1950, 1953
- Dr Lagan Cup (3): 1954, 1955, 1956
- All-Ireland Minor Football Championship (1): 1949
- Ulster Minor Football Championship (1): 1949

Ulster

- Railway Cup (1): 1956
