= Kevin Heffernan (Gaelic footballer) =

Irish Gaelic footballer and manager (1929–2013

Personal information
- Native name: Caoimhín Ó hIfearnáin (Irish)
- Nickname: Heffo
- Born: 20 August 1929 Dublin, Ireland
- Died: 25 January 2013 (aged 83) Dublin, Ireland

Sport
- Sport: Gaelic football
- Position: Left Corner Forward
Club
- Years: Club
- 1948–1967: St Vincent's
Club titles
| | Football | Hurling |
| Dublin titles | 15 | 6 |
Inter-county
| Years | County | Apps (scores) |
| 1948–1962 | Dublin | 115 (52–226) |
Inter-county titles
- Leinster titles: 4
- All-Irelands: 1
- NFL: 3

Kevin Heffernan (20 August 1929 – 25 January 2013) was an Irish Gaelic footballer and manager who played as a left corner-forward at senior level for the Dublin county team.

Heffernan made his debut during the 1948 championship, and was a regular member of the starting fifteen until his retirement after the 1962 championship. During that time he won one All-Ireland SFC medal, four Leinster SFC medals and three National League medals. An All-Ireland SFC runner-up on one occasion, Heffernan captained the team to the 1958 All-Ireland SFC title.

At club level, Heffernan had a lengthy career with St Vincent's. He won fifteen county football championship medals and six county hurling championship medals.

In retirement from playing, Heffernan became involved in coaching and team management. As Dublin manager, he revived the county team and steered them to three All-Ireland SFC titles between 1974 and 1983.

Heffernan had a number of personal achievements. In 1974, he became the only non-player to be honoured as the Texaco Footballer of the Year. In 1984, he was named in the left corner-forward position on the GAA's Team of the Century. He was confirmed in this position when the Team of the Millennium was named in 1999.

== Early and private life ==
Kevin Heffernan was born on 20 August 1929 in Dublin. Unlike many of his contemporaries, he was not born into a football background, as his father's interests included hunting and shooting rather than Gaelic games. Heffernan's family moved to the Marino area of the city when he was very young, and it was here that he first came into contact with both football and hurling. He later attended Scoil Mhuire and St Joseph's Christian Brothers School, Fairview, where he made much progress as a hurler and as a footballer. It was in secondary school that he first experienced major success, as he won a Leinster Colleges hurling title in 1945. Heffernan attended Trinity College Dublin in the 1950s, ignoring the long-standing episcopal ban on Catholics attending the university. He was involved in the formation of the TCD GAA club and was the first man to receive a Pink, TCD's award for sporting excellence, in Gaelic football.

By profession, Heffernan was a personnel manager for the Electricity Supply Board (ESB), and he became Chairman of the Labour Court.

== Playing career ==
=== Club ===
Heffernan's club hurling and football career coincided with a hugely successful period in the history of the famous St Vincent's club in Dublin. In terms of football, he won a total of 15 senior county championship medals, completing a seven in-a-row 1949 to 1955, a six in-a-row between 1957 and 1962, before winning his 14th and 15th county titles in 1966 and 1967. Heffernan also won six senior county championship hurling titles in 1953, 1954, 1955, 1957, 1959 and 1962.

=== Inter-county ===
Heffernan played both hurling and football at minor level with Dublin in the early 1940s. He won a Leinster MFC medal in 1946 and a Leinster MHC medal in 1947. He made his senior debut for the Dublin footballers the same year that he was sitting his Leaving Certificate, breaking his jaw in a game just days before his first exam. In spite of this inauspicious start, Heffernan went on to have a distinguished inter-county career.

Heffernan won an All-Ireland JFC medal with the junior football team in 1948. In 1953, he won a National Football League title, before winning a second medal in 1955. Later that year, Heffernan claimed his first Leinster SFC title; however, his side were later defeated by Kerry in the 1955 All-Ireland SFC final. Three years later, in 1958, Heffernan was captain of Dublin when he won his third National League title, as well as a second Leinster SFC title. Heffernan later guided his native county to an All-Ireland SFC victory over Derry in 1958. He then won two further Leinster SFC titles, in 1959 and 1962; however, he won no further All-Ireland SFC titles as a player. He retired from inter-county football shortly afterwards.

== Managerial career ==
Kevin Heffernan
Sport
Inter-county management
- Years: Team
- 1973–1976 1979–1986: Dublin
Inter-county titles as manager
| County | League | Province | All-Ireland |
| Dublin | 3 | 7 | 7 |

Following his inter-county career with Dublin, Heffernan became manager of the senior inter-county team in late 1973, with Donal Colfer and Lorcan Redmond as his fellow selectors. This era was dominated by an intense rivalry between Dublin and Kerry. In his first championship season in charge, Heffernan guided Dublin to first Leinster SFC and All-Ireland SFC titles since 1963. His young Dublin team captivated the imagination of the youth and working class of the city. Dublin's supporters branded themselves 'Heffo's Army' in his honour.

When that championship had finished, Heffernan became the only non-player to be nominated Texaco Footballer of the Year. In 1975, Dublin won a second consecutive Leinster SFC title; however, a young Kerry team defeated Dublin in the subsequent All-Ireland SFC final. Dublin regained the initiative the following year, winning the National League title, as well as a third consecutive Leinster SFC title, before defeating Kerry in the 1976 All-Ireland SFC final.

After this victory Heffernan unexpectedly resigned as Dublin manager, to be replaced by Tony Hanahoe, who acted as player–captain–manager. Heffernan returned as manager in 1979 but, after claiming a sixth consecutive Leinster SFC title, Dublin lost to Kerry in the 1979 All-Ireland SFC final. Many of that Dublin team fell by the wayside after 1980, though Heffernan built a new team based around Brian Mullins in midfield, and – in a match remembered mainly for its unsporting conduct – a twelve-man Dublin achieved victory over fourteen-man Galway in the 1983 All-Ireland SFC final. Played in atrocious conditions, the referee sent off four players, three of whom were from Dublin, and that win led to the team being dubbed "the twelve apostles". In January 1986, Heffernan stepped down as Dublin manager.

== Retirement and death ==
After retiring from inter-county management, Heffernan maintained his involvement in the sport. In 1984 (the GAA's centenary year), he was named in the left corner-forward position on the GAA's Football Team of the Century, before managing Ireland to victory over Australia in the 1986 International Rules Series.

In 2000, Heffernan was named in the left corner-forward position on the GAA's Football Team of the Millennium. He also continued his involvement with the St Vincent's club. In 2004, at the age of 74, Heffernan was in charge of the club's under-15 hurling team, which – with a late free from Oliver McElvaney – won a memorable championship final against Cuala, having defeated Ballyboden in the semi-final. This particular St Vincent's team had never beaten either of those clubs before, which further enhanced Heffernan's managerial reputation. In 2006, he trained the club's minor hurling team.

In 2005, Heffernan was granted the Freedom of the City of Dublin, placing him in a pantheon that includes U2, Nelson Mandela and Bill Clinton. He was also among the 25 recipients of the Irish Examiner GAA President's Awards for 2006. The ceremony – presented by former GAA president Seán Kelly – took place on 31 March 2006.

Heffernan was a consultant to the management of the Dublin minor football team for 2007. His appointment received overwhelming approval from the Dublin County Board, and he was working with the Dublin minor boss Timmy McCarthy and his managerial colleagues John Archibald and John Lowndes in an advisory capacity for the young Dubs.

Heffernan died in January 2013. At his funeral, attended by huge crowds among them senior politicians, three flags—the Dublin and St Vincent's GAA club flags plus a flag Heffernan was given in 2005 when he was awarded the Freedom of Dublin—were put up at the side of the altar; he was buried in Sutton cemetery.

== Honours ==
- Freedom of the City of Dublin: 2004

== See also ==
- List of people on the postage stamps of Ireland

Achievements
| Preceded by Dermot O'Brien (Louth) | All-Ireland SFC winning captain 1958 | Succeeded by Mick O'Connell (Kerry) |
| Preceded by Donie O'Donovan (Cork) | All-Ireland SFC winning manager 1974 | Succeeded by Mick O'Dwyer (Kerry) |
| Preceded by Mick O'Dwyer (Kerry) | All-Ireland SFC winning manager 1976 | Succeeded by Tony Hanahoe (Dublin) |
| Preceded by Eugene McGee (Offaly) | All-Ireland SFC winning manager 1983 | Succeeded by Mick O'Dwyer (Kerry) |
Sporting positions
| Preceded by Jim Crowley | Dublin Senior Football Captain; 1958 | Succeeded by Ollie Freaney |
| Preceded by | Dublin Senior Football Captain; 1962 | Succeeded by Lar Foley |
| Preceded by | Dublin Senior Football Manager; 1973–1976 | Succeeded by Tony Hanahoe |
| Preceded by Tony Hanahoe | Dublin Senior Football Manager; 1978–1985 | Succeeded by Brian Mullins; Robbie Kelleher; Seán Doherty |
Awards
| Preceded by Billy Morgan (Cork) | Texaco Footballer of the Year; 1974 | Succeeded by John O'Keeffe (Kerry) |
