= Knocknagoshel GAA =

Gaelic football team in County Kerry, Ireland

- CLG Cnoc na gCaiseal
- Founded: 1932
- County: Kerry
- Colours
- Grounds: Willie Walsh Park
- Coordinates: 52°19′25″N 9°22′54″W

Playing kits
First kit	Second kit

Knocknagoshel GAA is a Gaelic football club based in the village of Knocknagoshel in County Kerry. The club is affiliated to the North Kerry Football Board and is a member club of the St Kieran's Divisional team which competes annually in the Kerry Senior Football Championship.

The club competes in the annual Kerry Junior Football Championship and North Kerry Senior Football Championship.

The club has had several players who represented Kerry, among them multiple All-Ireland winners Eddie Walsh and Ned Roche. The former was a member of the Kerry team that played in the 1947 All-Ireland final at the Polo Grounds in New York.

== History ==
The club was founded in 1932 and tasted its first success during the 1940s when they won 3 Castleisland District league titles. Knocknagoshel players were members of the Castleisland District team that won the Kerry Senior Football Championship in 1950. In 1978 the club won its first North Kerry League title, adding a second in 1983. In 1987 they won their first Kerry Novice Championship and the following year the St Kieran's team that won the 1988 Kerry Senior Football Championship contained a number of Knocknagoshel players. The club reached the final of the Kerry Junior Football Championship in 1989 but lost to neighbours Brosna.

A third North Kerry League title was won in 1997 as well as a second Kerry Novice Championship. The club acquired new land for development in 1999 and this was officially completed and opened as Willie Walsh Park in 2004. Later that year the club won the Kerry Novice Shield defeating Templenoe. In 2025 the club reached the final of the North Kerry Senior Football Championship for the first time and after initially drawing with Listowel Emmets they lost the replay. In 2026 they reached the final of the Kerry Junior Football Championship but lost again, this time to Finuge.

== Honours ==
- Kerry Novice Championship (2): 1987, 1997
- Kerry Novice Shield Championship (1): 2004
- North Kerry League (3): 1978, 1983, 1997
- Castleisland District League (3): 1941, 1944, 1946

== Notable players ==
- Eddie Walsh (5 time All-Ireland winner)
- Ned Roche (2 time All-Ireland winner)
