= Johnny Joyce (Gaelic footballer) =

Irish Gaelic footballer (1937–2019)

Personal information
- Native name: Seán Seoige (Irish)
- Born: 1937 Donnycarney, County Dublin, Ireland
- Died: 29 October 2019 (aged 82) Donnycarney, County Dublin, Ireland
- Occupation: Clerk
- Height: 5 ft 11 in (180 cm)

Sport
- Sport: Gaelic football
- Position: Full-forward
Club
- Years: Club
- St Vincent's
Club titles
- Dublin titles: 6
Inter-county
Years	County	Apps (scores)
1956-1963	Dublin	22
Inter-county titles
- Leinster titles: 4
- All-Irelands: 1
- NFL: 1

John Joyce (1937 – 29 October 2019) was an Irish Gaelic footballer who played for Dublin Senior Championship St Vincent's. He played at senior level for the Dublin county team for seven years, during which time he usually lined out as a full-forward.

Joyce began his football career at club level with St Vincent's. After winning a Dublin Minor Championship medal in 1955, he subsequently broke onto the club's senior team. Joyce won the first of four successive Dublin Senior Championship medals in 1957 before bring his overall tally to six with further wins in 1962 and 1964.

At inter-county level, Joyce was part of the successful Dublin minor team that won the All-Ireland Championship in 1955. He joined the Dublin senior team in 1956. From his debut, Joyce was ever-present as an inside forward and made a combined total of 61 National League and Championship appearances in a career that ended with his last game in 1963. During that time he was part of the All-Ireland Championship-winning team in 1958. Joyce also secured four Leinster Championship medals and a National Football League medal.

Joyce is currently Dublin's second-highest goalscorer of all time, having scored 39–55 in 61 appearances. At inter-provincial level, he was selected to play in several championship campaigns with Leinster, winning two Railway Cup medals.

Joyce scored 5–3 against Longford in 1960, which remained a record highest individual scorer in any championship football match until 2002 when Rory Gallagher of Fermanagh matched it with 3–9. Joyce then lost the joint record to Cillian O'Connor of Mayo's four goals (accompanied by nine points) in the 2020 All-Ireland Senior Football Championship semi-final at Croke Park.

== Honours ==
St Vincent's

- Dublin Senior Football Championship (6): 1957, 1958, 1959, 1960, 1962, 1964

Dublin

- All-Ireland Senior Football Championship (1): 1958
- Leinster Senior Football Championship (4): 1958, 1959, 1962, 1963
- National Football League (1): 1957-58
- All-Ireland Minor Football Championship (1): 1955
- Leinster Minor Football Championship (1): 1955

Leinster

- Railway Cup (2): 1959, 1961
