= Tom Ashe =

Irish Gaelic footballer

Personal information
- Native name: Tomás Ághas (Irish)
- Born: 1927 Dingle, County Kerry, Ireland
- Died: 19 October 2016 (aged 88) Dingle, County Kerry, Ireland
- Occupation: Businessman
- Height: 5 ft 11 in (180 cm)

Sport
- Sport: Gaelic football
- Position: Left corner-forward
Club
- Years: Club
- Dingle
Club titles
- Kerry titles: 1
Inter-county
Years	County	Apps (scores)
1948-1953	Kerry	9 (4-09)
Inter-county titles
- Munster titles: 2
- All-Irelands: 1
- NFL: 0

Thomas Michael Ashe (1927 – 19 October 2016) was an Irish Gaelic footballer who played at club level with Dingle and at inter-county level with the Kerry senior football team. He usually lined out as a forward.

== Career ==
Ashe first came to Gaelic football prominence as a member of the Dingle club, with whom he won a County Championship title in 1948. He first appeared on the inter-county scene during a two-year stint with the Kerry minor football team and won an All-Ireland Minor Championship title in 1946. Ashe was drafted onto the Kerry senior football team in 1948, however, he later spent a brief spell in goal for the Celtic reserve team in Glasgow but never played with the first team. After returning to Ireland he resumed his position on the Kerry team and won two Munster Championship titles in three seasons as well as an All-Ireland Championship title in 1953. Ashe also earned selection with the Munster team and was a Railway Cup-winner in 1949.

== Personal life and death ==
Ashe ended his inter-county career early to concentrate on the running of the family business in Dingle. He married Kathleen Flahive in 1957 and had five children.

Ashe died in Dingle on 19 October 2016.

== Honours ==
Dingle

- Kerry Senior Football Championship: 1948

Kerry

- All-Ireland Senior Football Championship: 1953
- Munster Senior Football Championship: 1951, 1953
- All-Ireland Minor Football Championship: 1946
- Munster Minor Football Championship: 1945, 1946

Munster

- Railway Cup: 1949
