= Gerry O'Neill (Gaelic footballer) =

Armagh Gaelic footballer

Personal information
- Born: 1927 Middletown, County Armagh
- Died: 3 August 2010 (aged 82–83)

Sport
- Sport: Gaelic football
Club
- Years: Club
- Middletown

Gerry O'Neill (1927 - 3 August 2010) was an Irish Gaelic footballer who played as a left corner-forward at senior level for the Armagh county team.

Born in Middletown, County Armagh, O'Neill first played competitive Gaelic football during his schooling at St Patrick's Grammar School in Armagh. Here he won back-to-back MacRory Cup medals before winning a Hogan Cup medal in 1946. At club level O'Neill had a lengthy career with Middletown.

O'Neill made his first impression on the inter-county scene as a member of the Armagh junior team. He won an Ulster medal in this grade in 1948; however, an All-Ireland title eluded the team. O'Neill later joined the Armagh senior team, winning his first ulster medal in 1950. He won a second Ulster medal in 1953; however, he ended the year as an All-Ireland runner-up.

In retirement from playing O'Neill became involved in team management and coaching. He was a selector with the Middletown team that won the county junior championship title in 1974.

O'Neill died on 3 August 2010.

== Honours ==
St Patrick's Grammar School

- Hogan Cup (1): 1946
- MacRory Cup (2): 1945, 1946

Armagh

- Ulster Senior Football Championship (2): 1950, 1953
- Ulster Junior Football Championship (1): 1948
