= Denis Mahony =

Irish Gaelic footballer (1928–2017)

Denis "Danno" Mahony (23 July 1928 – 3 April 2017) was an Irish Gaelic footballer who played as a right corner-back at senior level for the Dublin county team.

Born in Cork, Mahony and his family later settled in Glasnevin in Dublin. Educated at the O'Connell School, he later joined the St Vincent's club. During his club career, Mahony won eight county senior championship medals.

Mahony made his debut on the inter-county scene at the age of sixteen when he was selected for the Dublin minor team. He played for two championship seasons with the minor team, culminating with the winning of an All-Ireland medal in his debut season in 1945. Mahony subsequently joined the Dublin senior team. During his career he won one Leinster medal and two National Football League medals. He played his last championship game for Dublin in July 1957.

Mahony died on 3 April 2017.

== Honours ==
St Vincent's

- Dublin Senior Football Championship (8): 1949, 1950, 1951, 1952, 1953, 1954, 1955, 1957

Dublin

- Leinster Senior Football Championship (1): 1955
- National Football League (2): 1952-53, 1954-55
- All-Ireland Minor Football Championship (1): 1945
- Leinster Minor Football Championship (2): 1945, 1946
