= Damien O'Hagan =

Irish Gaelic footballer

Personal information
- Born: May 1960 (age 66)

Sport
- Sport: Gaelic football
- Position: Forward
Clubs
- Years: Club
- 1979–1984 1984–1998: Grange; Coalisland Na Fianna
Inter-county
- Years: County
- ?–?: Tyrone
Inter-county titles
- Ulster titles: 3
- All-Irelands: 0
- All Stars: 1

Damien O'Hagan is a former Gaelic footballer who played at senior level for the Tyrone county team. He played for his county at minor including an all Ireland minor final at 15, under-21 and senior levels. While he was playing for Tyrone, the county won three Ulster Senior Football Championship (SFC) titles but never won the All-Ireland Senior Football Championship. He won an All Star Award in 1986, when he was part of the first Tyrone team to reach the All-Ireland SFC final, lost to Kerry by a scoreline of 2–15 to 1–10.

== Early life ==
O'Hagan's father, John Joe, was also a footballer, winning two All-Ireland Minor Football Championship medals and two Ulster SFC titles. O'Hagan went to trials for his father's club with which he had won 5 senior championships, Clonoe, at the age of ten. He did not get into the team and was later asked to join Coalisland na Fianna by Jodie O’Neill, where he would go on to have successful club career.

O’Hagan, upon returning from Cork in 1984 led Coalisland to the Intermediate League and championship double.

In 1989 he added a first senior league and championship double. Coalisland reached the Ulster club final this year but were beaten by Scotstown of Monaghan. O’Hagan didn’t play in this game due to a broken collar bone. Coalisland then went back to back in the 1990 senior championship which he was captain.

He retired in 1998 and took up coaching within the club. He has added multiple underage league and championships at all levels including minor league titles in 2005, 2006 and 2007 along with the minor Championship in 2007 and to date the clubs only Ulster Minor Championship beating Cavan Gaels in the final at St Pauls Belfast on New Years Day 2007. Coalisland were 7 points down early on in the second half when they mounted a comeback to win by 1.

O’Hagan managed Coalisland seniors in the early 00’s and won a senior 1b league. He then took the reins at the beginning of 2010 along with Peter Herron and Joey McNeice and led the club to senior championship glory beating carickmore and bridging a 20 year gap from the last title captained by himself. The majority of this team was backboned by the successful Ulster minor championship of 2007. The team had zero Tyrone senior representatives on the panel.

In 2018 with a relegation battle looming O’Hagan, Herron and son Jarlath O’Hagan took over midway through the 2018 campaign to steady the ship. Heavy outsiders at the beginning of the championship and heavy underdogs in 3 of their 4 championship games Coalisland defeated Dromore in the first round, Errigal Ciaran parish in the quarter final, Edendork in the semi final and Killyclogher in the final. A second half resurgence by Coalisland delivered a 7 point victory and 10th O’Neill Cup to the club. O’Hagans 4th O’Neill cup.

As of 2025 O’Hagan is back at the helm of coalisland with Peter Herron and Peter Donnelly as he attempts to lead the club back to senior football.

== Honours ==
Inter-county

- Ulster Senior Football Championship (3): 1984,1986,1989
- Ulster U-21 Football Championship (1): 1980
- Ulster Minor Football Championship (3): 1975,1976,1978

Inter-provincial

- Railway cup (2): 1989,1991

Club

- Cork Junior Football Championship (1): 1979
- Tyrone Intermediate Football Championship (1): 1984
- Tyrone Intermediate Football League (1): 1984
- Tyrone Senior Football Championship (2): 1989, 1990
- Tyrone Senior Football League (1): 1991
- Tyrone Senior Football Championship (Manager) (2): 2010, 2018
