= Eddie Walsh (footballer) =

Irish Gaelic footballer (1914–2006)

Personal information
- Native name: Éamonn Breathnach (Irish)
- Born: Knocknagoshel, County Kerry

Sport
- Sport: Gaelic football
- Position: Left wing-back
Club
- Years: Club
- 1930s-1940s: Knocknagoshel
Inter-county
Years	County	Apps (scores)
1938-1947	Kerry	38 (0-00)
Inter-county titles
- Munster titles: 8
- All-Irelands: 5
- NFL: 0

Eddie Walsh (1914–2006) was an Irish sportsperson. He played Gaelic football with his local club Knocknagoshel and was a member of the Kerry senior inter-county team in the 1930s and 1940s.

Walsh won five All-Ireland Senior Football Championship medals (1937, 1939, 1940 1941 and 1946), and eight Munster Senior Football Championship medals with Kerry. He also won Railway Cup medals with Munster in 1941 and 1946. Walsh died in 2006 aged 92.
