= Cyril Freaney =

Gaelic footballer

Sport
- Sport: Gaelic football
- Position: Corner-forward
Inter-county
- Years: County
- Dublin

Cyril Freaney was a Gaelic footballer who played for the Dublin county team.

He played as corner-forward in the 1955 All-Ireland Senior Football Championship Final.

Freaney later recounted his memories of the game. He said that on the morning the Dublin team gathered in Barry's Hotel to dine on scrambled egg, that this was the occasion when the Dublin team first wore blue socks and that the players were permitted to keep the jerseys they wore during the game.
