= 1958–59 National Football League (Ireland) =

Gaelic football competition

League details
- Dates: October 1958 – 10 May 1959

League champions
- Winners: Kerry (5th win)
- Captain: John Dowling

League runners-up
- Runners-up: Derry
- Captain: Jim McKeever

Other division winners
- Division 2: Leitrim

The 1958–59 National Football League was the 28th staging of the National Football League (NFL), an annual Gaelic football tournament for the Gaelic Athletic Association county teams of Ireland.

Leitrim reached their first and only NFL semi-final, and Derry reached their first final, where they lost to Kerry.

== Group stage ==
=== Division IV ===
==== Final ====
22 March 1959 Final	Kerry	5-15 — 1-2	Waterford	Clonmel

==== Group A ====
Team	Pld	W	D	L	Pts	Status
Kerry	4	3	1	0	7	Advance to knockout phase
Carlow	4	2	2	0	6
Cork	4	2	0	2	4
Kildare	4	1	1	2	3
Wexford	4	0	0	4	0

==== Group B ====
Team	Pld	W	D	L	Pts	Status
Waterford	3	3	0	0	6
Clare	3	2	0	1	4
Tipperary	3	1	0	2	2
Kilkenny	3	0	0	3	0

== Knockout stage ==
=== Semi-finals ===
12 April 1959

Derry	3-7 – 1-6	Leitrim

Croke Park, Dublin

19 April 1959

Kerry	3-8 – 0-5	Offaly

Croke Park, Dublin

=== Final ===
10 May 1959

Kerry	2-8 – 1-8	Derry
Jim Brosnan 1-1; Tom Long 1-0; Dan McAuliffe 0-3; Paudie Sheehy 0-2; Dave Geaney, John Dowling 0-1 each

Croke Park, Dublin
Attendance: 32,405
Referee: M McArdle (Louth)
