= Frank Kernan =

Armagh Gaelic footballer

Frank Kernan (1931 - 11 February 2011) was a Gaelic footballer who played as a right wing-back at senior level for the Armagh county team.
