= Joe Cunningham (Gaelic footballer) =

Armagh Gaelic footballer

Joe Cunningham (1931 – 21 August 2012) was a Gaelic footballer who played as a right wing-forward at club level for Armagh Harps, at inter-county level for the Armagh county team and at inter-provincial level for Ulster.
