= Peter O'Reilly (Gaelic footballer) =

Irish Gaelic football player (1916–1994)

Personal information
- Native name: Peadar Ó Raghallaigh (Irish)
- Born: 1916 Dublin, Ireland
- Died: April 1994 (aged 77) Dublin, Ireland

Sport
- Sport: Gaelic football
Club
- Years: Club
- St Mary's
Club titles
- Dublin titles: 0
Inter-county
- Years: County
- 1941-1945: Dublin
Inter-county titles
- Leinster titles: 2
- All-Irelands: 1

Peter O'Reilly (1916 - April 1994) was an Irish Gaelic football manager, coach and player. His championship career at senior level with the Dublin county team lasted for several seasons throughout the 1940s. His older brother Joe O'Reilly was an Irish international soccer player in the 1930s.

O'Reilly first came to prominence on the inter-county scene as a member of the Dublin senior team in 1941 when he won his first Leinster medal. He won a second Leinster medal in 1942 before later claiming an All-Ireland medal following a defeat of Galway.

As a member of the Leinster inter-provincial team on several occasions, O'Reilly won back-to-back Railway Cup medals in 1944 and 1945.

Even during his playing days O'Reilly was heavily involved in coaching and team management. He trained the Dublin team that won the All-Ireland title in 1942 before repeating the feat in 1958. O'Reilly later guided Offaly to a first All-Ireland final appearance in 1961. His coaching career ended with a spell in charge of Kildare in the late 1960s.

== Honours ==
=== Player ===
Dublin

- All-Ireland Senior Football Championship (1): 1942
- Leinster Senior Football Championship (2): 1941, 1942

Leinster

- Railway Cup (2): 1944, 1945

=== Manager ===
Dublin

- All-Ireland Senior Football Championship (2): 1942, 1958
- Leinster Senior Football Championship (5): 1941, 1942, 1955, 1958, 1959

Offaly

- Leinster Senior Football Championship (2): 1960, 1961
