= Knocknagoshel =

Village in County Kerry, Ireland

Knocknagoshel Cnoc na gCaiseal
- Village
- Location in Ireland
- Coordinates: 52°19′53″N 9°22′53″W
- Country: Ireland
- Province: Munster
- County: County Kerry
- Time zone: UTC+0 (WET)
  - Summer (DST): UTC-1 (IST (WEST))
- Irish Grid Reference: R055208

Knocknagoshel, officially Knocknagashel (Irish: Cnoc na gCaiseal, meaning 'hill of the stone ringforts'), is a village in County Kerry, Ireland. It is around 15 km south east of Listowel. According to the 2011 census, the population of the Knocknagashel Electoral Division (which includes the village and approximately 40 km^{2} of the surrounding rural hinterland) was 697 (down from 721 as of 2006).

== History ==
Knocknagoshel is a village in northeast County Kerry, close to the borders with counties Limerick and Cork. In August 1916, Cardinal Cassata granted power to Bishop John Mangan to establish a parish in Knocknagoshel, having formerly been part of Brosna parish.

A banner, carried by local men at a rally addressed by politician Charles Stewart Parnell in Newcastle West in 1891, made reference to Knocknagoshel. The banner, which read "Arise Knocknagoshel, and take your place among the nations of the earth!", is commemorated by a plaque on the gable end of a house in the centre of Knocknagoshel village.

Just outside the village is a steeply inclined field, which in 1923 was part of Baranarigh Wood, where five soldiers of the Irish Free State National Army were killed by a booby trap mine on 6 March of that year during the Irish Civil War. The men killed at Knocknagoshel included three officers and two privates, one of whom was a local man. Lieutenant Pat O’Connor was targeted by the Anti-Treaty IRA because of his knowledge of the local IRA organisation and the men involved in it and because of the manner in which he had pursued the anti-treaty guerrillas. The soldiers were lured into the trap by false information about a Republican dugout in the area. The attack was responded to by a series of reprisals against the anti-treaty side. This included the torture of local men by Free State troops who were then tied to mines in Ballyseedy, killing them when the mine exploded. Altogether, Free State troops killed or executed 19 Republican prisoners in Kerry over the next two weeks.

The Gaelic footballer Eddie Walsh, who played at half-back with the Kerry senior football team, was from Knocknagoshel.

== Culture ==
=== Festivals ===
The annual pattern festival, known locally as "the pattern" is held on 15 August. The word pattern comes from the Irish "patrun" or English "patron". In the old days, most Irish parishes had a patron saint. On the saint's feast day, the parishioners celebrated what was known as a "pattern day", with Mass and a visit to the holy well dedicated to the local saint. In the evening, the families of Knocknagoshel compete in a ribbon twirling competition. One member of each of the competing families twirl their family ribbons in tune to traditional music.

The Nelius O'Connor Traditional Music Festival which began in 2004 takes place in July each year, with musicians, singers and storytellers invited to take part.

=== Drama ===
The Spike Players is a local drama group which started with a variety show in 2010. In 2011, the group staged the comedy Troubled Bachelors, and in 2016 self-produced The Mountainy Puck, which led to an invitation to perform in London. In 2020, the group produced and performed a Sam Cree play titled Separate Beds.

=== Literature ===
Works based in Knocknagoshel include Gander at the Gate by Rory O'Connor and Tomorrow Was Another Day by Seamus O'Connor.

== Sport ==
The local Gaelic Athletic Association club, Knocknagoshel GAA, was founded in 1932. The club won the Castleisland District League in 1941, 1944 and again in 1946.

In 1950, the Castleisland District team, including Knocknagoshel players won the County Championship. The divisional St Kieran's Gaelic football side won the 1988 championship and also contained Knocknagoshel players. A number of Knocknagoshel footballers (both Senior men and Ladies' Gaelic footballers) have also played with Kerry teams.

Knocknagoshel won the North Kerry League in 1978, 1983 and 1997.

== See also ==
- List of towns and villages in Ireland
