= Mixie Palmer =

Irish Gaelic footballer

Personal information
- Native name: Séamus M. Ó Maolómhair (Irish)
- Nickname: Mixie
- Born: 1927 Kenmare, County Kerry, Ireland
- Died: 21 December 2022 (aged 95) Tralee, County Kerry, Ireland
- Occupation: Cattle salesman
- Height: 5 ft 11 in (180 cm)

Sport
- Sport: Gaelic football
- Position: Left corner-back
Club
- Years: Club
- Killarney Legion
Club titles
- Kerry titles: 1
Inter-county
Years	County	Apps (scores)
1949-1955	Kerry	21 (1-01)
Inter-county titles
- Munster titles: 5
- All-Irelands: 2
- NFL: 0

James Michael Palmer (1927 - 21 December 2022), known as Mixie Palmer, was an Irish Gaelic footballer who played for club side Killarney Legion and at inter-county level with the Kerry senior football team.

== Career ==
Born in Kenmare, County Kerry, Palmer played at club level with Killarney Legion and won a County Championship medal in 1946. He first appeared on the inter-county scene as a member of the Cork minor football team in 1945 before subsequently winning an All-Ireland Junior Championship medal with Kerry in 1949. Palmer's performances in this grade resulted in an immediate call-up to the senior team and he won the first of five Munster Championship medals in 1950. He claimed his first All-Ireland title after a defeat of Armagh in the 1953 All-Ireland final. After defeat by Meath the following year, Palmer collected a second winners' medal after lining out at left corner-back in Kerry's defeat of Dublin in the 1955 All-Ireland final.

== Honours ==
Killarney Legion

- Kerry Senior Football Championship: 1946

Kerry

- All-Ireland Senior Football Championship: 1953, 1955
- Leinster Senior Football Championship: 1950, 1951, 1953, 1954, 1955
- All-Ireland Junior Football Championship: 1949
- Munster Junior Football Championship: 1949
