= Gerard McStay =

Armagh Gaelic footballer

Gerard McStay (1928 - August 2001) was a Gaelic footballer who played as a centre-back for the Clan na Gael club and at senior level for the Armagh county team.
