= Seán Quinn (Gaelic footballer) =

Armagh Gaelic footballer

Personal information
- Native name: Seán Ó Coinne (Irish)
- Born: 1929 Lurgan, County Armagh, Northern Ireland
- Died: 27 January 1986 (aged 56) Rathgar, Dublin, Republic of Ireland
- Occupation: Carpenter
- Height: 5 ft 7 in (170 cm)

Sport
- Sport: Gaelic football
- Position: Left wing-back
Clubs
- Years: Club
- Sarsfields; Seán McDermotts
Club titles
- Roscommon titles: 0
Inter-county
- Years: County
- Armagh
Inter-county titles
- Connacht titles: 2
- All-Irelands: 0
- NFL: 0

Seán Quinn (1929 – 27 January 1986) was an Irish Gaelic footballer who played for the Sarsfields and Seán McDermotts clubs and at senior level for the Armagh county team.

== Career ==
Born in Lurgan, County Armagh, Quinn first came to prominence at club level with Sarsfields. He eventually earned a call-up to the Armagh senior football team and claimed Ulster Championship medals in 1950 and 1953. Quinn was captain for the second of those wins and subsequently lead the team to an All-Ireland final defeat by Kerry. He also played with the Seán McDermotts club in Dublin, while his inclusion on the Ulster team saw him claim a Railway Cup medal. Quinn was named on a "Football Team of the Century" made up of players who never won an All-Ireland medal.

== Personal life and death ==
Quinn worked as a carpenter and was also a member of the Irish Army. He died from cancer at St. Luke's Hospital in Rathgar on 27 January 1986.

== Honours ==
Armagh

- Ulster Senior Football Championship: 1950, 1953

Ulster

- Railway Cup: 1950

Sporting positions
Preceded by	Armagh Senior Football Captain; 1953	Succeeded by
