= Ollie Freaney =

Irish Gaelic footballer

Personal information
- Native name: Oilibhéar o Fráire (Irish)
- Born: 1929
- Died: 1991 (aged 61–62) County Donegal

Sport
- Sport: Football
- Position: Forward
Club
- Years: Club
- St Vincents
Club titles
- Dublin titles: 13
Inter-county
Years	County	Apps (scores)
	Dublin	90 (23–242)
Inter-county titles
- All-Irelands: 1

Oliver Freaney (1929 – 27 September 1991) was a Gaelic footballer who played for the Dublin county team.

Freaney was Ireland's top-scoring forward in 1955 and 1959. He scored a goal in the 1955 All-Ireland Senior Football Championship Final. With 23–242 (311 points), Freaney is Dublin's seventh all-time highest scorer in league and championship. He made 90 appearances for his county in league and championship.

Alongside Kevin Heffernan, Freaney pioneered Dublin's more "scientific" approach, which did not work too well when they met Kerry. Freaney won 13 Dublin Senior Football Championships with St Vincents.

Freaney owned one of the country's biggest accountancy companies. He married Kathleen Mullen from Portnablagh, County Donegal. He died while holidaying in Donegal in 1991.
