= 1948 All-Ireland Minor Football Championship =

Gaelic football competition

All-Ireland Champions
- Winning team: Tyrone (2nd win)
- Captain: Eddie Devlin

All-Ireland Finalists
- Losing team: Dublin

Provincial Champions
- Munster: Kerry
- Leinster: Dublin
- Ulster: Tyrone
- Connacht: Galway

The 1948 All-Ireland Minor Football Championship was the 17th staging of the All-Ireland Minor Football Championship, the Gaelic Athletic Association's premier inter-county Gaelic football tournament for boys under the age of 18.

Tyrone entered the championship as defending champions.

On 26 September 1948, Tyrone won the championship following an 0-11 to 1-5 defeat of Dublin in the All-Ireland final. This was their second All-Ireland title overall and their second in succession.

== Results ==
=== All-Ireland Minor Football Championship ===
Semi-Finals

Final

26 September 1948 Final	Tyrone	0-11 - 1-05	Dublin	Croke Park, Dublin

== Championship statistics ==
=== Miscellaneous ===
- Eddie Devlin of Tyrone becomes the first player to captain a team to two All-Ireland titles.
