= Tadhg Lyne =

Irish Gaelic footballer (1930–2000)

Tadhgie Lyne

Personal information
- Born: 8 December 1930 Killarney, County Kerry
- Died: 31 May 2000 (aged 69)

Sport
- Sport: Gaelic football
- Position: half-forward
Club
- Years: Club
- 1950s–1960s: Dr. Croke's
Inter-county
| Years | County | Apps (scores) |
| 1952–1960 | Kerry | 24(5–65) |
Inter-county titles
- Munster titles: 6
- All-Irelands: 3
- NFL: 1

Tadhgie Lyne ( 8 December 1930 – 31 May 2000) was an Irish Gaelic footballer with Kerry. Called 'the Prince of Forwards', Lyne was one of the finest scoring forwards of his time.

== Early life ==
Tadhgie Lyne grew up on High Street, Killarney, only half a mile from the famous Kerry ground of Fitzgerald Stadium. His football talent was apparent from an early age, and he spent hours daily practicing the skills of the game with a ball suspended from the rafters of his father's house. Despite being called for trials for the Kerry All-Ireland Minor Football Championship for two years in succession he could not make the panel, with contemporaries such as Jerome O'Shea and Seán Murphy outshining him.

== Playing career ==
Lyne's county career only began after his club, the Dick Fitzgeralds, won the 1951 Kerry Senior Football Championship. Lyne kicked 1–5 from right-half forward in the final against Dingle. He became a fixture in the Kerry team for a decade. In 1953, Lyne played at wing-forward on the Kerry team that won the Munster Senior Football Championship and went on to play in his first All-Ireland Senior Football Championship final, giving a man-of-the-match display with six points as Kerry beat Armagh 0–13 to 1–6.

Kerry won Munster and reached the All-Ireland final again in 1954, but Meath beat them by 1–13 to 1–7. In 1955, Lyne might have been lost to football, but he turned down the offer of a professional soccer contract with Glasgow Celtic to play with Kerry. Kerry was Munster champions for the third consecutive time that year. They progressed to face Cavan in the All-Ireland semi final. Lyne scored 1–6 and punched a goal in the last moments to earn Kerry a draw. They went on to win the replay and faced Dublin. Lyne kicked a fine point in the first minute and notched five more as Kerry won by 0–12 to 1–9. The game is remembered as "Tadhgie Lyne's All-Ireland". He was the championship's top marksman that year with five goals and forty-two points and was named Footballer of the Year.

Lyne won another Munster senior medal in 1958 when he came on as a replacement in the final. However, Kerry was beaten in the All-Ireland semi-final. The 'Prince of Forwards' gained his third and final All-Ireland in 1959. Kerry won the Munster championship and went on to qualify for the All-Ireland final, in which they beat Galway by nine points.

== Later life ==
Tadhg Lyne died at his home on Killarney Road, Castleisland on 31 May 2000 at the age of 69.

Sporting positions
| Preceded by John Joe Sheehan | Kerry Senior Football Captain; 1952 | Succeeded by Paudie Sheehy |
