= John Dowling (Gaelic footballer) =

Kerry Gaelic footballer

Personal information
- Born: Tralee, County Kerry

Sport
- Sport: Gaelic football
- Position: Full-forward
Club
- Years: Club
- 1940s-1960s: Kerins O'Rahilly's
Club titles
- Kerry titles: 3
Inter-county
Years	County	Apps (scores)
1951-1961	Kerry	26 (1-22)
Inter-county titles
- Munster titles: 6
- All-Irelands: 2
- NFL: 2

John Dowling (1930–1998) was an Irish sportsperson. He played Gaelic football for his local Kerins O'Rahilly's club and at senior level for the Kerry county team between 1954 and 1961. Dowling captained Kerry to the All-Ireland SFC title in 1955. He won Munster and All-Ireland Junior Medals with Kerry in 1949. He also won a Munster Minor Championship medal in 1948.

Sporting positions
Preceded by Mick Murphy	Kerry Senior Football Captain; 1954-1955	Succeeded by
Achievements
Preceded by Peter McDermott (Meath)	All-Ireland SFC winning captain 1955	Succeeded by Jack Mangan (Galway)
