= Colm Kennelly =

Irish Gaelic footballer

Personal information
- Native name: Colm Ó Cionnfhaolaidh (Irish)
- Born: 24 April 1933 Ballylongford, County Kerry, Ireland
- Died: 12 January 1999 (aged 65) Killarney, County Kerry, Ireland
- Occupation: Engineer
- Height: 5 ft 11 in (180 cm)

Sport
- Sport: Gaelic football
- Position: Right wing-back
Clubs
- Years: Club
- Ballylongford → Shannon Rangers
Club titles
- Kerry titles: 0
Inter-county
Years	County	Apps (scores)
1952-1957	Kerry	16 (0-01)
Inter-county titles
- Munster titles: 3
- All-Irelands: 2
- NFL: 0

Colm Kennelly (1933 – 12 January 1999) was an Irish Gaelic footballer who played at club level with Ballylongford, at divisional level with Shannon Rangers and at inter-county level with the Kerry senior football team. He usually lined out as a defender.

== Honours ==
Kennelly first came to Gaelic football prominence as a member of the Ballylongford club before earning selection on the Shannon Rangers divisional team. He first appeared on the inter-county scene during a three-year stint with the Kerry minor football team and won an All-Ireland Minor Championship title in 1950. Kennelly was drafted onto the Kerry senior football team in 1952 and was a regular over the following five seasons. During that time he won three consecutive Munster Championship titles is well as All-Ireland Championship titles in 1953 and as a sub in 1955. Kennelly also earned selection with the Munster team.

== Personal life and death ==
Born in Ballylongford, County Kerry, Kennelly was one of eight children of Tim and Bridie Kennelly (née Ahern). His brother, Brendan Kennelly, was professor of Modern English at Trinity College, Dublin. Kennelly graduated from the same institution with a degree in engineering in 1953 and started work with the Electricity Supply Board. He spent three years working in British Guyana before taking up his first appointment with Kerry County Council in 1960. He retired in 1996, having served as county engineer for the previous nine years.

Kennelly, who had suffered from a heart condition for several years, died suddenly in Killarney on 12 January 1999.

== Honours ==
Kerry

- All-Ireland Senior Football Championship: 1953, 1955
- Munster Senior Football Championship: 1953, 1954, 1955
- All-Ireland Minor Football Championship: 1950
- Munster Minor Football Championship: 1949, 1950, 1951
