= Norman Allen (dual player) =

Irish hurler and Gaelic footballer (1928–2021)

Norman Allen (21 July 1928 – 26 November 2021) was an Irish hurler and Gaelic footballer. After beginning his playing career at club level with St Vincents, he later became a dual player at inter-county level with Dublin. A mainstay on both senior teams during the early 1950s, Allen won Leinster Championship medals in both codes; however, All-Ireland Championship success eluded him. Ahead of the 1955 All-Ireland Senior Football Championship Final, Allen was a casualty to appendicitis.
