= John Joe Sheehan =

Irish Gaelic footballer (1929–2020)

Personal information
- Native name: Seán Seosamh Ó Síocháín (Irish)
- Born: 6 May 1929 Farranfore, County Kerry, Ireland
- Died: 16 June 2020 (aged 91) Bon Secours Hospital, Cork, Ireland
- Occupation: National school teacher
- Height: 6 ft 1 in (185 cm)

Sport
- Sport: Gaelic football
- Position: Centre-forward
Clubs
- Years: Club
- Firies; Killarney Legion
Club titles
- Kerry titles: 1
Inter-county*
Years	County	Apps (scores)
1949–1955	Kerry	11 (2–07)
Inter-county titles
- Munster titles: 4
- All-Irelands: 2
- NFL: 0
- *Inter County team apps and scores correct as of 00:18, 18 June 2020.

John Joe Sheehan (6 May 1929 – 16 June 2020) was an Irish Gaelic footballer. At club level he played with the Killarney Legion club and was a two-time All-Ireland Championship winner with the Kerry senior football team.

== Playing career ==
Born in Farranfore, Sheehan first enjoyed success when, in 1946 and still a schoolboy, he won a Kerry County Championship medal with Killarney Legion and an All-Ireland Minor Championship with the Kerry minor football team. While training to be a teacher at St. Patrick's College he was selected for the Dublin senior football team but declared for Kerry and made his debut in the first round of the 1949-50 league. Sheehan captained Kerry to the Munster Championship title in 1951, before a spinal injury ruled him out of the game before a comeback which saw him win two All-Ireland Championship medals from three final appearances between 1953 and 1955. He was also selected for the Munster inter-provincial team on a number of occasions.

== Honours ==
Killarney Legion

- Kerry Senior Football Championship (1): 1946

Kerry

- All-Ireland Senior Football Championship (2): 1953, 1955
- Munster Senior Football Championship (4): 1951 (c), 1953, 1954, 1955

Sporting positions
Preceded by Jackie Lyne	Kerry Senior Football Captain; 1951	Succeeded by Tadhg Lyne
