= 1947 All-Ireland Minor Football Championship =

Gaelic football competition

Championship details

All-Ireland Champions
- Winning team: Tyrone (1st win)

All-Ireland Finalists
- Losing team: Mayo

Provincial Champions
- Munster: Kerry
- Leinster: Offaly
- Ulster: Tyrone
- Connacht: Mayo

The 1947 All-Ireland Minor Football Championship was the 16th staging of the All-Ireland Minor Football Championship, the Gaelic Athletic Association's premier inter-county Gaelic football tournament for boys under the age of 18.

Kerry entered the championship as defending champions, however, they were defeated in the All-Ireland semi-final

On 14 September 1947, Tyrone won the championship following a 4-4 to 4-3 defeat of Mayo in the All-Ireland final. This was their first All-Ireland title.

== Results ==
=== All-Ireland Minor Football Championship ===
Semi-Finals

Final

14 September 1947 Final	Tyrone	4-04 - 4-03	Mayo	Croke Park, Dublin

== Championship statistics ==
=== Miscellaneous ===
- Offaly win the Leinster title for the first time in their history.
