= 1958 All-Ireland Senior Football Championship =

Football championship

Championship details
- Dates: April 27 – September 28, 1958
- Teams: 29

All-Ireland Champions
- Winning team: Dublin (16th win)
- Captain: Kevin Heffernan
- Manager: Peter O'Reilly

All-Ireland Finalists
- Losing team: Derry
- Captain: Jim McKeever
- Manager: R. Gribben

Provincial Champions
- Munster: Kerry
- Leinster: Dublin
- Ulster: Derry
- Connacht: Galway

Championship statistics
- No. matches played: 32

The 1958 All-Ireland Senior Football Championship was won by Dublin, who beat Derry in the final. The championship, the premier competition in Gaelic football, is a series of games organised by the Gaelic Athletic Association and played during the summer and early autumn. A young Martin O'Neill was at the game with his mother, his older brother played in the final.

Louth were the defending champions, however, they were defeated by Dublin in the Leinster final.

== Roll of Honour ==
- Kerry – 18 (1955)
- Dublin – 16 (1958)
- Wexford – 5 (1918)
- Cavan – 5 (1952)
- Galway – 4 (1956)
- Kildare – 4 (1928)
- Tipperary – 4 (1920)
- Louth – 3 (1957)
- Mayo – 3 (1951)
- Cork – 3 (1945)
- Meath – 2 (1954)
- Roscommon – 2 (1944)
- Limerick – 2 (1896)

== Results ==
=== Connacht Senior Football Championship ===
15 June 1958
Quarter-Final

Mayo	3–10 – 1–6	Sligo
J Nallen (0–1), J Fleming (0–1), F O’Leary (0–3), S Gallagher (0–1); T Treacy (1–2), J O’Connell (2–1), L Malone (0–1).

Fr. O'Hara Park, Charlestown
Attendance: 5,000
Referee: Bill Jackson (Roscommon)

22 June 1958
Semi-Final

Leitrim	0–11 – 0–9	Roscommon

St. Coman's Park, Roscommon
Attendance: 10,000

29 June 1958
Semi-Final

Galway	2–9 – 0–6	Mayo
		W Shannon (0–1), J Nallen (0–1), S Gallagher (0–1); T Treacy (0–3, one free),

Tuam Stadium, Tuam
Attendance: 22,122
Referee: Mick Higgins (Cavan)

==== Final ====
13 July 1958
Final

Galway	2–10 – 1–11	Leitrim

St. Coman's Park, Roscommon
Attendance: 12,000
Referee: J. Mulvey

=== Leinster Senior Football Championship ===
27 April 1958
Preliminary Round

Carlow	1–10 – 1–9	Wicklow

Geraldine Park, Athy

27 April 1958
Preliminary Round

Meath	3–9 – 0–7	Longford

Cusack Park, Mullingar

11 May 1958
Preliminary Round

Offaly	4–3 – 1–5	Laois

St. Conleth's Park, Newbridge
Attendance: 10000
Referee: P McDermott (Meath)

11 May 1958
Quarter-Final

Louth	2–9 – 3–4	Westmeath

Páirc Tailteann, Navan

18 May 1958
Quarter-Final

Carlow	2–6 – 1–6	Wexford

Dr. Cullen Park, Carlow
Attendance: 6000
Referee: J. Dowling (Offaly)

1 June 1958
Quarter-Final

Dublin	1–12 – 2–7	Meath

Drogheda Park, Drogheda

1 June 1958
Quarter-Final

Offaly	1–11 – 1–6	Kildare
		K.O'Malley 2–5, E.Treacy 0–2, E.Hogan 0–1

O'Moore Park, Portlaoise
Attendance: 25000
Referee: P McDermott (Meath)

22 June 1958
Semi-Final

Dublin	3–9 – 2–7	Carlow

O'Moore Park, Portlaoise

29 June 1958
Semi-Final

Louth	4–3 – 1–5	Offaly

Croke Park, Dublin
Attendance: 26703
Referee: J Canavan

==== Final ====
20 July 1958
Final

Dublin	1–11 – 1–06	Louth
Ollie Freaney 0-6f, Kevin Heffernan 1–1, John Timmons 0–2, Paddy Farnan 0–2		Kevin Beahan 1–5 (1–0 pen, 0-4f, 1 '50), Jim McDonnell 0–1

Páirc Tailteann, (Navan)
Attendance: 27,689
Referee: John Dowling (Offaly)

GK	1	Paddy O'Flaherty (Beann Éadair)
RCB	2	Maurice Whelan (St Vincents)
FB	3	Marcus Wilson (St Vincents)
LCB	4	Joe Timmons (St Mary's)
RHB	5	Cathal O'Leary (St Vincents)
CHB	6	Jim Crowley (St Vincents)
LHB	7	Seán O'Boyle (Air Corps)
MF	8	Seán Murray (Skerries Harps)
MF	9	John Timmons (St Mary's)
RHF	10	Pádraig Haughey (St Vincents)
CHF	11	Ollie Freaney (St Vincents)
LHF	12	Des Ferguson (St Vincents)
RCF	13	Paddy Farnan (St Vincents)
FF	14	Johnny Joyce (St Vincents)
LCF	15	Kevin Heffernan (St Vincents) (c)
Substitutes:
	16	Lar Foley (St Vincents) for O'Leary

GK	1	Seán Óg Flood (Dundalk Young Irelands)
RCB	2	Ollie Reilly (Hunterstown Rovers)
FB	3	Jim McArdle (Roche Emmets)
LCB	4	Jim Meehan (Naomh Mhuire)
RHB	5	Patsy Coleman (St Mary's)
CHB	6	Paddy Markey (St Mary's)
LHB	7	Stephen White (Dundalk Young Irelands)
MF	8	Séamus O'Donnell (Cooley Kickhams)
MF	9	Mickey Gartlan (Roche Emmets)
RHF	10	Kevin Beahan (Seán McDermotts, Dublin)
CHF	11	Dermot O'Brien (St Mary's) (c)
LHF	12	Frank Lynch (Geraldines)
RCF	13	Alfie Monk (Naomh Mhuire)
FF	14	Jimmy McDonnell (Darver Volunteers)
LCF	15	Jim Roe (St Mary's)
Substitutes:
	16	Barney McCoy (St Mary's) for Markey
	17	Dan O'Neill (St Dominic's) for Gartlan

=== Munster Senior Football Championship ===
15 June 1958
Quarter-Final

Waterford	3–9 – 1–7	Clare

Fraher Field, Dungarvan

29 June 1958
Semi-Final

Kerry	1–6 – 0–7	Tipperary
M. O'Dwyer (1–1), P. Sheehy (0–1), N. Fitzgerald (0–1) & G. McMahon (0–1)

Semple Stadium, Thurles
Referee: C. Crowley (Waterford)

29 June 1958
Semi-Final

Cork	1–11 – 1–4	Waterford
N. Fitzgerald (0–1), T. Furlong (1–1), C. O’Sullivan (0–3) & D. Kelleher (0–4).

Páirc MacGearailt, Fermoy

==== Final ====
13 July 1958
Final

Kerry	2–7 – 0–3	Cork
Garry McMahon 2–2, John Dowling 0–4 (0-1f), Paudie Sheehy 0–1		Eric Ryan (0-1f), Tim O'Leary, Denis Kelleher 0–1 each

Cork Athletic Grounds, Cork
Attendance: 21,858
Referee: P. Silke (Limerick)

=== Ulster Senior Football Championship ===
1 June 1958
Quarter-Final

Derry	0–8 – 0–5	Antrim

Casement Park, Belfast

15 June 1958
Quarter-Final

Cavan	0–7 – 0–7	Monaghan

St Tiernach's Park, Clones
Attendance: 8,500

15 June 1958
Quarter-Final

Down	3–11 – 3–5	Donegal

Páirc Esler, Newry

22 June 1958
Quarter-Final

Tyrone	1–9 – 0–10	Armagh

O'Neill Park, Dungannon

29 June 1958
Quarter-Final, 1st Replay

Cavan	1–9 – 1–5	Monaghan

Breffni Park, Cavan
Attendance: 10,000

An objection was made and a replay ordered

6 July 1958
Quarter-Final, 2nd Replay

Cavan	0–14 – 1–6	Monaghan

Casement Park, Belfast

6 July 1958
Semi-Final

Down	1–9 – 0–2	Tyrone

The Playing Fields, Lurgan
Attendance: 10,000

13 July 1958
Semi-Final

Derry	4–7 – 3–6	Cavan

St Tiernach's Park, Clones
Attendance: 6,000

==== Final ====
27 July 1958
Final

Derry	1–11 – 2–4	Down

St Tiernach's Park, Clones
Attendance: 22,000

=== All-Ireland series ===
August 17, 1958
Semi-Final

Dublin	2–7 – 1–9	Galway

Croke Park, Dublin

August 24, 1958
Semi-Final

Derry	2-6 – 2-5	Kerry
		T. Lyne (2-2), G. McMahon (0-1) & P.Sheehy (0-2).

Croke Park, Dublin

==== Final ====
September 28, 1958
Final
Report

Dublin	2–12 – 1–9	Derry
O. Freaney 0–7, K. Hefferan 0–3, P. Franan 1–1, J. Joyce 1–0 & J. Timmons 0–1.		S. O'Connell 0–5, O. Gribbin 1–1, B. Mullan, D. McKeever & J. McKeever 0–1.

Croke Park, Dublin
Attendance: 73,371
Referee: Simon Deignan (Cavan)

== Championship statistics ==
=== Miscellaneous ===
- Derry play in their first All Ireland final also win their first Ulster championship final but lose to Dublin.
- There were a number of first-time championship meetings: The Derry/Kerry All Ireland semi-final was their first championship meeting and the All Ireland final was the first championship meeting of Dublin/Derry.
