= Jock Haughey =

Irish Gaelic footballer

Personal information
- Native name: Pádraig Ó hEochaidh (Irish)
- Nickname: Jock
- Born: 10 October 1932 Dublin, Ireland
- Died: 10 October 2003 (aged 71) Dublin, Ireland

Sport
- Sport: Gaelic football
- Position: Right wing-forward
Club
- Years: Club
- St. Vincent's
Inter-county
- Years: County
- Dublin
Inter-county titles
- Leinster titles: 3
- All-Irelands: 1
- NFL: 2

Pádraig "Jock" Haughey (10 October 1932 – 10 October 2003) was an Irish Gaelic footballer who played as a right wing-forward at senior level for the Dublin county team.

Haughey began his inter-county career as a member of the Dublin senior team in the early 'fifties and experienced much success going forward into the early 'sixties. During that time he won one All-Ireland medal, three Leinster medals and two National Football League medals. Haughey was an All-Ireland runner-up on one occasion.

At club level Haughey won numerous county club championship medals with St Vincents.

His brother, Charles, served as Taoiseach on three occasions between 1979 and 1992.

He worked for Matt Gallagher as an engineer in the Gallagher Group.

In the 1970 Arms Crisis, Haughey was investigated by the Garda Síochána, suspected of having imported arms into Ireland illegally.
