= 1946 All-Ireland Minor Football Championship =

Gaelic football competition

Championship details

All-Ireland Champions
- Winning team: Kerry (4th win)

All-Ireland Finalists
- Losing team: Dublin

Provincial Champions
- Munster: Kerry
- Leinster: Dublin
- Ulster: Tyrone
- Connacht: Mayo

The 1946 All-Ireland Minor Football Championship was the 15th staging of the All-Ireland Minor Football Championship, the Gaelic Athletic Association's premier inter-county Gaelic football tournament for boys under the age of 18.

Dublin entered the championship as defending champions.

On 6 October 1946, Kerry won the championship following a 3–7 to 2–3 defeat of Dublin in the All-Ireland final. This was their fourth All-Ireland title and their first in ten championship seasons.

== Results ==
=== All-Ireland Minor Football Championship ===
Semi-Finals

Final

6 October 1946 Final	Kerry	3-07 - 2-03	Dublin	Croke Park, Dublin

== Championship statistics ==
=== Miscellaneous ===
- The All-Ireland final was originally scheduled for 22 September 1946, but was delayed for two weeks as part of the "Save the Harvest" campaign.
