= Jim Brosnan (Gaelic footballer) =

Personal information
- Born: County Kerry

Sport
- Sport: Gaelic football
- Position: Midfield/Forward
Club
- Years: Club
- 1940s–1970s: Moyvane
Inter-county
Years	County	Apps (scores)
1949–1959	Kerry	28 (3–23)
Inter-county titles
- Munster titles: 5
- All-Irelands: 2
- NFL: 1
- All Stars: 0

Jim Brosnan (1930 – 3 December 2011) was a Gaelic footballer, manager and administrator from County Kerry. He played with Kerry during the 1940s and 1950s.

== Personal life ==
Brosnan started his life in Moyvane, being the son of the famous Con Brosnan. Con collected six medals back in the twenties and thirties. His brother Mick, who was also a doctor, spent his life practising in England. Brosnan practised his medicine in Dingle.

== Club ==
He played club football with Moyvane and Shannon Rangers. He won a number of North Kerry Senior Football Championships with Moyvane.

He won All-Irelands with Kerry in 1953 and 1955. He was flown home specially for the 1955 final from America. He also won a National League medal in 1959. He also won a Munster Minor Championship medal in 1948.

During his college days he was a star with UCC. He won 2 Sigerson Cup titles with the college in 1943 and 1946. He was selected on the 2011 Sigerson Team of the Century.

As a manager he led Kerry to back to back All Ireland Minor titles in 1962 and 63.

Brosnan took over as Kerry team trainer in 1965. He held this position until 1968

As an administrator he served as chairman of the Kerry County Board for several years. It was he who was instrumental in putting the Kerry club structure in place which is very often envied by other counties. He also served as chairman of the Dingle club.
