= 1957–58 National Football League (Ireland) =

Gaelic football competition

League details
- Dates: October 1957 – 18 May 1958

League champions
- Winners: Dublin (3rd win)
- Captain: Kevin Heffernan

League runners-up
- Runners-up: Kildare
- Captain: Larry McCormack

The 1957–58 National Football League was the 27th staging of the National Football League (NFL), an annual Gaelic football tournament for the Gaelic Athletic Association county teams of Ireland.

Dublin beat Kildare's "All-Whites" (the name Lilywhites came later) by five points in the final. The game was level when Dublin scored a controversial goal with five minutes remaining.

== Results ==
=== Finals ===
18 May 1958
Final

| Dublin | 3-13 – 3-8 | Kildare |

Croke Park, Dublin
Attendance: 49,268
Referee: Simon Deignan (Cavan)
