= 1952–53 National Football League (Ireland) =

Football competition

League details
- Dates: 19 October 1952 – 9 May 1953

League champions
- Winners: Dublin (1st win)
- Captain: Mossy Whelan

League runners-up
- Runners-up: Cavan
- Captain: Mick Higgins

The 1952–53 National Football League was the 22nd staging of the National Football League (NFL), an annual Gaelic football tournament for the Gaelic Athletic Association county teams of Ireland.

Dublin defeated Cavan in the final, wearing St Vincents' white and blue shirts — not just to prevent a colour clash, but because fourteen of their team were Vincents' men (the exception being goalkeeper Tony O'Grady of the Air Corps club).

== Format ==
Teams are placed into Divisions I, II, III and IV. The top team in each division reach the semi-final.

== Results ==
=== Division III ===
Mayo, Kerry and Galway were tied at the top, so had a playoff round which Kerry won. Clare and Cork were at the bottom.

=== Finals ===
12 April 1953
Semi-Final

Cavan	3-6 – 2-5	Kerry

Croke Park, Dublin

25 April 1953
Final

Dublin	4-6 – 0-9	Cavan

Croke Park, Dublin
Attendance: 37,605
Referee: Séamus Hayes (Tipperary)
