= 1954–55 National Football League (Ireland) =

Gaelic football competition

League details
- Dates: October 1954 – 8 May 1955

League champions
- Winners: Dublin (2nd win)
- Captain: Denis Mahony

League runners-up
- Runners-up: Meath
- Captain: Patsy Ratty

The 1954–55 National Football League was the 24th staging of the National Football League (NFL), an annual Gaelic football tournament for the Gaelic Athletic Association county teams of Ireland.

Dublin beat Meath in the first all-Leinster final.

== Format ==
A rob robin system as usual.

== League Tables ==
=== Division I (Dr Lagan Cup) ===
==== Final ====
19 December 1954

Armagh	1-5 – 1-1	Donegal

Coalisland
Referee: S.Deignan Cavan

=== Division II ===
Team	Pld	W	D	L	Pts	Status
Meath	6	6	0	0	12	Qualified for knockout stage
Cavan	6	4	0	2	8
Mayo	4	3	0	1	6
Westmeath	6	3	0	3	6
Longford	6	1	1	4	3
Leitrim	4	0	1	3	1
Sligo	4	0	0	4	0

=== Division III ===
Team	Pld	W	D	L	Pts	Status
Dublin	6	5	1	0	11	Qualified for knockout stage
Wicklow	6	5	0	1	10
Louth	6	4	0	2	8
Galway	6	3	1	2	7
Offaly	6	2	0	4	4
Laois	5	0	0	5	0
Roscommon	5	0	0	5	0

=== Division IV ===
Team	Pld	W	D	L	Pts	Status
Kildare	6	5	0	1	10	Qualified for play-off
Cork	6	5	0	1	10	Qualified for play-off
Kerry	6	4	0	2	8
Wexford	6	3	0	3	6
Carlow	5	2	0	3	4
Tipperary	6	1	0	5	2
Waterford	5	0	0	5	0

==== First-place play-off ====
3 March 1955

Cork	1-5 – 0-6	Kildare

Cork Athletic Grounds

Cork advance to knockout stages

== Knockout stages ==
=== Semi-finals ===
24 April 1955

Meath	1-9 – 1-8	Armagh

Croke Park, Dublin

17 April 1955

Dublin	0-12 – 0-9	Cork

Croke Park, Dublin

=== Final ===
8 May 1955
3:15 p.m.

Dublin	2-12 – 1-3	Meath

Croke Park, Dublin
Attendance: 42,916
Referee: Seán Cleary (Tipperary)
