= 1953 All-Ireland Senior Football Championship =

Football championship

Championship details
- Dates: May 10 – September 27, 1953
- Teams: 29

All-Ireland Champions
- Winning team: Kerry (17th win)
- Captain: James Murphy

All-Ireland Finalists
- Losing team: Armagh
- Captain: Seán Quinn

Provincial Champions
- Munster: Kerry
- Leinster: Louth
- Ulster: Armagh
- Connacht: Roscommon

Championship statistics
- No. matches played: 27

The 1953 All-Ireland Senior Football Championship was the 67th staging of Ireland's premier Gaelic football knock-out competition.

Leitrim return to Connacht championship after 3 years.

Kerry were the winners.

== Results ==
=== Connacht Senior Football Championship ===
21 June 1953
Quarter-final

Galway	1–8 – 0–2	Leitrim

St. Coman's Park, Roscommon

28 June 1953
Semi-final

Sligo	1–6 – 2–6	Mayo
		P Carney (1–3, one point a‘50’), M Mulderrig (0–1), P Solan (0–1) & S O’Donnell (1–1).

Corran Park, Ballymote

5 July 1953
Semi-final

Roscommon	4–4 – 0–3	Galway

Tuam Stadium, Tuam

==== Final ====
19 July 1953
Final

Roscommon	1–6 – 0–6	Mayo
		P Carney (0–3, frees), M Flanagan (0–1) & P Solan (0–2).

St. Coman's Park, Roscommon
Attendance: 15,000

=== Leinster Senior Football Championship ===
10 May 1953
Preliminary round

Wicklow	4–7 – 2–10	Longford

O'Connor Park, Tullamore

10 May 1953
Preliminary round

Carlow	1–9 – 2–1	Kildare
		S.Brennan 1–1, T.McCarthy 1–0

Geraldine Park, Athy

10 May 1953
Preliminary round

Louth	2–11 – 0–5	Westmeath

Páirc Tailteann, Navan

24 May 1953
Quarter-final

Meath	2–6 – 2–5	Dublin

Páirc Tailteann, Navan
Attendance: 29,753

24 May 1953
Quarter-final

Wexford	1–9 – 0–11	Laois

Dr. Cullen Park, Carlow

31 May 1953
Quarter-final

Offaly	1–7 – 0–9	Carlow

O'Moore Park, Portlaoise
Attendance: 11,745
Referee: W Delaney (Laois)

7 June 1953
Quarter-final

Louth	1–10 – 0–4	Wicklow

Croke Park, Dublin

28 June 1953
Semi-final

Offaly	0–7 – 1–7	Wexford

Dr. Cullen Park, Carlow
Referee: W Delaney (Laois)

5 July 1953
Semi-final

Louth	1–7 – 1–6	Meath

Croke Park, Dublin

==== Final ====
26 July 1953

Louth	1–07 – 0–07	Wexford
Hugh O'Rourke (1–0), Jim McDonnell (0–3, 1f), Dermot O'Brien (0–2), Peadar Smith (0–1), John Callan (0–1)		Rory Deane (0–6, 4f), Billy Kelly (0–1)

Croke Park, Dublin
Attendance: 28,739
Referee: Bill Delaney (Laois)

GK	1	Niall O'Neill (Dundalk Gaels)
RCB	2	Jack Bell (St Mary's)
FB	3	Tom Conlon (Stabannon Parnells)
LCB	4	Jim Tuft (Dundalk Young Irelands)
RHB	5	Paddy McArdle (St Mary's)
CHB	6	Paddy Markey (St Mary's)
LHB	7	Stephen White (Dundalk Young Irelands)
MF	8	Hubert Reynolds (Oliver Plunketts)
MF	9	Michael McDonnell (Darver Volunteers)
RHF	10	Peadar Smith (Oliver Plunketts)
CHF	11	Jimmy McDonnell (Darver Volunteers)
LHF	12	Dermot O'Brien (St Mary's)
RCF	13	John Callan (St Mary's)
FF	14	Jack Regan (Dundalk Gaels) (c)
LCF	15	Hugh O'Rourke (Civil Service, Dublin)
Substitutes:
	16	Jim Conlon (Stabannon Parnells) for Tuft

GK	1	Joe O'Neill (Ferns St Aidan's)
RCB	2	John Morris (St John's Volunteers)
FB	3	Nick Redmond (Banba, Dublin)
LCB	4	John Fardy (Gusserane O'Rahilly's)
RHB	5	Mick O'Hanlon (Gusserane O'Rahilly's)
CHB	6	Willie Goodison (St John's Volunteers)
LHB	7	John J. Culleton (Gusserane O'Rahilly's)
MF	8	Padge Kehoe (St Aidan's, Enniscorthy)
MF	9	Aidan McCormack (St Aidan's, Ballymitty)
RHF	10	Larry Larkin (Gusserane O'Rahilly's)
CHF	11	Billy Rackard (Rathnure)
LHF	12	Rory Deane (Bunclody)
RCF	13	Billy Kelly (Seán McDermotts, Dublin)
FF	14	Nicky Rackard (Rathnure) (c)
LCF	15	Des O'Neill (Rathnure)
Substitutes:
	16	Matt Foley (Gusserane O'Rahilly's) for Larkin

=== Munster Senior Football Championship ===
31 May 1953
Quarter-final

Waterford	2–4 – 0–4	Tipperary

Walsh Park, Waterford
Referee: J. White

5 July 1953
Semi-final

Kerry	6–10 – 0–2	Clare
P. Sheehy (3–3), T. Lyne (0–2), J. Brosnan (0–2), S. Kelly (1–2) & J. Lyne (2–1).

Cusack Park, Ennis

5 July 1953
Semi-final

Cork	1–7 – 1–5	Waterford
D. Kellaher (1–1), T. Kelleher (0–2), M. Cahill (0–3) & J. J. Henichion (0–1)

Walsh Park, Waterford

==== Final ====
19 July 1953
Final

Kerry	2–7 – 2–3	Cork
P. Sheehy (0–1), T. Lyne (0–4), J. Brosnan (0–1), S. Kelly (1–0), J. Lyne (0–1) & Sub T. Ashe (1–0).		N. Fitzgerald (1–0), D. Kellaher (0–1), N. Duggan (0–1) & M.Cahill (0–1).

Fitzgerald Stadium, Killarney

=== Ulster Senior Football Championship ===
30 May 1953
Quarter-final

Derry	1–11 – 2–5	Down

Rossa Park, Magherafelt

14 June 1953
Quarter-final

Tyrone	8–7 – 0–3	Donegal

MacCumhaill Park, Ballybofey

21 June 1953
Quarter-final

Armagh	1–8 – 1–4	Antrim

The Playing Fields, Lurgan
Attendance: 6,000

21 June 1953
Quarter-final

Cavan	2–7 – 0–2	Monaghan

Breffni Park, Cavan

5 July 1953
Semi-final

Cavan	2–10 – 2–4	Tyrone

St. Tiernach's Park, Clones

12 July 1953
Semi-final

Armagh	4–11 – 1–5	Derry

Casement Park, Belfast

==== Final ====
26 July 1953
Final

Armagh	1–6 – 0–5	Cavan

Casement Park, Belfast
Attendance: 30,000

=== All-Ireland Senior Football Championship ===
9 August 1953
Semi-final

Armagh	0–8 – 0–7	Roscommon

Croke Park, Dublin
Attendance: 40,372

23 August 1953
Semi-final

Kerry	3–6 – 0–10	Louth
T. Ashe (2–0), S. Kelly (1–1), P. Sheehy (0–2), T. Lyne (0–1), G. O'Sullivan (0–1) M. Brosnan (0–1)		J. McDonnell (0–7, 3f), J. Regan (0–2), P. Smith (0–1)

Croke Park, Dublin
Attendance: 62,408

GK	1	Johnny Foley (Kerins O'Rahilly's)
RCB	2	James Murphy (Garda, Cork)
FB	3	Ned Roche (Knocknagoshel)
LCB	4	Donie Murphy (Killarney Legion)
RHB	5	Colm Kennelly (Ballylongford)
CHB	6	John Cronin (Milltown/Castlemaine)
LHB	7	Seán Murphy (Geraldines, Dublin)
MF	8	Brendan O'Shea (Multyfarnham, Westmeath)
MF	9	Bobby Buckley (UCC, Cork)
RHF	10	Paudie Sheehy (UCC, Cork) (c)
CHF	11	Jim Brosnan (UCC, Cork)
LHF	12	Tadhg Lyne (Dr Crokes)
RCF	13	Tom Ashe (Dingle)
FF	14	Seán Kelly (Civil Service, Dublin)
LCF	15	Jackie Lyne (Killarney Legion)
Substitutes:
	16	Gerald O'Sullivan (St Mary's) for Jim Brosnan
	17	Mixie Palmer (Kenmare) for Kennelly
	18	Mick Brosnan (UCC, Cork) for Palmer
	19	Jim Brosnan for Ashe

GK	1	Niall O'Neill (Dundalk Gaels)
RCB	2	Jim Conlon (Stabannon Parnells)
FB	3	Tom Conlon (Stabannon Parnells)
LCB	4	Jim Tuft (Dundalk Young Irelands)
RHB	5	Paddy McArdle (St Mary's)
CHB	6	Paddy Markey (St Mary's)
LHB	7	Stephen White (Dundalk Young Irelands)
MF	8	Hubert Reynolds (Oliver Plunketts)
MF	9	Michael McDonnell (Darver Volunteers)
RHF	10	Peadar Smith (Oliver Plunketts)
CHF	11	Jimmy McDonnell (Darver Volunteers)
LHF	12	Dermot O'Brien (St Mary's)
RCF	13	Kevin Beahan (St Mary's)
FF	14	Jack Regan (Dundalk Gaels) (c)
LCF	15	Hugh O'Rourke (Civil Service, Dublin)
Substitutes:
	16	Jack Bell (St Mary's) for Tuft
	17	Kevin Connolly (Cooley Kickhams) for O'Rourke
	18	Paddy Beahan (St Mary's) for O'Brien
	19	Fintan Wynne (St Bride's) for Smith
	20	Peter Judge (Oliver Plunketts) for Jim Conlon

==== Final ====
27 September 1953
Final

Kerry	0–13 – 1–6	Armagh
J. Brosnan (0–4), J. J. Sheehan (0–3), T. Lyne (0–4), T. Ashe (0–1) & J.Lyne (0–1).		M. McEvoy (1–2), G. O'Neill (0–2), J. Cunnningham & B. Seeley (0–1).

Croke Park, Dublin
Attendance: 86,155
Referee: Peter McDermott (Meath)

== Championship statistics ==
=== Miscellaneous ===
- Leitrim return to Connacht championship after 3-year break.
- O'Kennedy Park GAA Grounds replaces Barrett's Park, in New Ross in honor of Seán O'Kennedy.
- Casement Park, opens in Belfast named after a 1916 rising leader Roger Casement.
- Louth play Westmeath in the Leinster championship for the first time since 1938.
- Munster semi-final between Kerry and Clare caused Clare to withdraw from the championship for a year due to a one-sided game 6–10 to 0–2.
- The Leinster semi-final between Louth and Meath was a historic 9th year in a row of meeting in the Leinster championship a famous 13th meeting between them in 9 years.
- The All Ireland semi-final between Roscommon and Armagh was the first championship meeting between them.
- Armagh play in their first All Ireland final but are beaten by Kerry.
