= 1955 All-Ireland Senior Football Championship =

Football championship

Championship details
- Dates: May 1 – September 25, 1955
- Teams: 29

All-Ireland Champions
- Winning team: Kerry (18th win)
- Captain: John Dowling

All-Ireland Finalists
- Losing team: Dublin
- Captain: Denis Mahony
- Manager: Peter O'Reilly

Provincial Champions
- Munster: Kerry
- Leinster: Dublin
- Ulster: Cavan
- Connacht: Mayo

Championship statistics
- No. matches played: 28

The 1955 All-Ireland Senior Football Championship was the 69th staging of Ireland's premier Gaelic football knock-out competition.

Meath were the defending champions, however, they were defeated by Dublin in the Leinster final.

Kerry were the winners.

Note Quarter Finals were back in the Munster championship but Clare only skipped 1 year. Limerick, not part of the championship between 1953 and 1964, were approved to host Waterford in the Quarter Final but did not play them due to a dispute over the eligibility of players.

== Results ==
=== Connacht Senior Football Championship ===
19 June 1955
Quarter-Final

Galway	0–3 – 1–6	Roscommon

McHale Park, Castlebar

26 June 1955
Semi-Final

Mayo	3–11 – 0–9	Leitrim
P Solan (0–2), D O’Neill (0–3), S O’Donnell (0–1); M Flanagan (0–1), T Langan (1–0), J Curran (2–4, two points from frees).

Markievicz Park, Sligo
Attendance: 3,431

3 July 1955
Semi-Final

Sligo	0–4 – 1–8	Roscommon

McHale Park, Castlebar
Attendance: 6,400

17 July 1955
Final

Mayo	3–11 – 1–3	Roscommon
J Nallen (0–1), T Langan (2–1), S O’Donnell (1–1), D O’Neill (0–2), J Curran (0–6, four frees).

Tuam Stadium, Tuam
Attendance: 18,500
Referee: P. Carrol (Offaly)

=== Leinster Senior Football Championship ===
1 May 1955
Preliminary Round

Westmeath	0–7 – 0–6	Wicklow

St. Conleth's Park, Newbridge

8 May 1955
Preliminary Round

Carlow	3–5 – 3–4	Laois

Geraldine Park, Athy

15 May 1955
Preliminary Round

Louth	1–3 – 0–5	Longford

Croke Park, Dublin

15 May 1955
Quarter-Final

Kildare	1–6 – 1–5	Wexford
P.Moore 1–0, S.Harrison, D.Dalton 0–2, J.Gough, L.McCormack 0–1.

Dr. Cullen Park, Carlow

22 May 1955
Quarter-Final

Dublin	3–9 – 0–6	Carlow

St. Conleth's Park, Newbridge

29 May 1955
Quarter-Final

Meath	3–4 – 2–7	Kildare
		J.Daly, P.Mooney 1–0, S.Harrison (2f), T.McCarthy 0–2, D.Dalton, S.Moore, M.Doyle 0–1.

Croke Park, Dublin

5 June 1955
Quarter-Final

Offaly	5–12 – 0–7	Louth

Croke Park, Dublin
Attendance: 16075
Referee: W Goodison (Wexford)

12 June 1955
Quarter-Final Replay

Meath	1–9 – 0–11	Kildare
		S.Harrison 0–6, P.Mooney 0–3, D.Dalton 0–2.

Croke Park, Dublin

3 July 1955
Semi-Final

Meath	0–10 – 1–6	Westmeath

Croke Park, Dublin

10 July 1955
Semi-Final

Dublin	2–3 – 1–9	Offaly

O'Moore Park, Portlaoise
Attendance: 20680
Referee: W Goodison (Wexford)

24 July 1955
Final

Dublin	5–12 – 0–7	Meath
Kevin Heffernan 2–0, Ollie Freaney 0–5 (0-3f), Sean O'Boyle 1–3, Cathal O'Leary 1–2, Des Ferguson 1–1, Padraig Haughey 0–1		Tom Duff 0–3 (0-2f), Brian Smyth 0–2, Frankie Byrne (0-1f) and Tom O'Brien 0–1 each

Croke Park, Dublin
Attendance: 48,860
Referee: Bill Goodison (Wexford)

=== Munster Senior Football Championship ===
Clare back in the Munster championship after 1-year break football again but even Limerick didn't take part between (1953–1964) there were approved to host Waterford in the Quarter Final but didn't take part The Limerick vs. Waterford was cancelled due to a dispute over the eligibility of players.

1955
Quarter-Final

Waterford	w/o – scr.	Limerick

Gaelic Grounds, Limerick

12 June 1955
Quarter-Final

Clare	1–10 – 0–7	Tipperary

Gaelic Grounds, Limerick
Referee: J. Collins (L)

26 June 1955
Semi-Final

Cork	2–8 – 0–7	Tipperary
D. Kellaher (0–4), E. Ryan (0–1), J. Creedon (2–2) & D. O’Donovan (0–1).

Ned Hall Park, Clonmel
Referee: J. Goode (W)

3 July 1955
Semi-Final

Kerry	3–7 – 0–4	Waterford
B. Buckley (1–0), T. Lyne (0–3), G. O'Sullivan (0–1), M. Murphy (0–1) & T. Costelloe (2–2).

Frank Sheehy Park, Listowel

24 July 1955
Final

Kerry	0–14 – 2–6	Cork
J. Dowling (0–1), P. Sheehy (0–5), T.Lyne (0–4), G. O'Sullivan (0–1), M. Murphy (0–2) & D. McAuliffe (0–1).		N. Duggan (0–1), D. Kellaher (0–2), J. Creedon (0–1), D. O’Donovan (0–1) & J. O’Donovan (2–2).

Fitzgerald Stadium, Killarney

=== Ulster Senior Football Championship ===
5 June 1955
Quarter-Final

Derry	0–13 – 1–5	Tyrone

Rossa Park, Magherafelt
Attendance: 4,500

5 June 1955
Quarter-Final

Donegal	3–8 – 2–8	Monaghan

Bundoran
Attendance: 4,500

12 June 1955
Quarter-Final

Armagh	1–8 – 0–5	Down

The Playing Fields, Lurgan

19 June 1955
Quarter-Final

Cavan	1–10 – 2–1	Antrim
P Donohoe (0–4), H Carolan (1–1), J Mc Donnell (0–1), B Gallagher (0–1), J Cusack (0–2), V Sherlock (0–1)		K Armstrong (2–0), P O Hara (1–1)

Breffni Park. Cavan
Attendance: 6,120

3 July 1955
Semi-Final

Armagh	0–2 – 3–4	Derry

Casement Park, Belfast

10 July 1955
Semi-Final

Cavan	2–5 – 1–6	Donegal
P Donohoe (0–2), V Sherlock (0–1), J Cusack (1–1), B Deignan (1–0), C Smith (0–1)		A Briody (0–1), H Boyle (0–2), S Mc Cormack (0–3), P Coyle (1–0)

St. Tiernach's Park, Clones
Attendance: 10,124

31 July 1955
Final

Cavan	0–11 – 0–8	Derry
P Donohoe (0–8), B Gallagher (0–2), J Hardy (0–1)		M Gribben (0–1), R Gribben (0–3), F Niblock (0–1), J Mc Keever (0–3)

St. Tiernach's Park, Clones
Attendance: 24,800

=== All-Ireland Senior Football Championship ===
14 August 1955
Semi-Final

Kerry	2–10 – 1–13	Cavan
J. Dowling (0–1), T. Moriarty (0–1) T. Lyne (1–6), J. Culloty (0–1), M. Murphy (1–0) & D. McAuliffe (0–1).		P Donohoe (0–9), H Carolan (0–2), Gallagher (0–1), P Smith (1–0), Keyes (0–1)

Croke Park, Dublin
Attendance: 41,278

21 August 1955
Semi-Final

Dublin	0–7 – 1–4	Mayo
		M Flanagan (0–1), T Langan (1–1), J Curran (0–2, frees)

Croke Park, Dublin
Attendance: 60,595
Referee: Peter McDermott (Meath)

11 September 1955
Semi-Final Replay

Kerry	4–7 – 0–5	Cavan
P. Sheehy (0–2), J. J. Sheehan (1–0), T. Lyne (0–5), J. Culloty (1–0) & Mick Murphy (2–0).		P Donohoe (0–5)

Croke Park, Dublin
Attendance: 71,504

11 September 1955
Semi-Final Replay

Dublin	1–8 – 1–7	Mayo
		J Curran (1–7, four frees).

Croke Park, Dublin
Attendance: 71,504

25 September 1955
Final

Kerry	0–12 – 1–6	Dublin
J. Dowling (0–1), P. Sheehy (0–1), T. Lyne (0–6), M. Murphy (0–1) & J. Brosnan (0–2).		O. Freaney 1–3, J. Boyle 0–2 & H. Hefferan 0–1.

Croke Park, Dublin
Attendance: 87,102
Referee: Willie Goodison ( Wexford)

== Championship statistics ==
=== Miscellaneous ===
- Even though Limerick did not take part in the Munster football championship between 1953 and 1964, they were scheduled to host Waterford but failed. The Limerick vs. Waterford match in the 1955 Munster Football Championship was cancelled due to a dispute over the eligibility of players. Clare returned to the championship after a skip year.
- Markievicz Park, Sligo was named after a woman of the 1916 uprising called Constance Markievicz.
- Both of the All Ireland semi-finals end in a draw and go to a replay.
- Dublin win their first Leinster title since 1942 and reach their first All Ireland final since that same year but are narrowly beaten by Kerry.
