= List of Meath senior Gaelic football team captains =

[] This article lists players who have captained the Meath senior football team in the Leinster Senior Football Championship and the All-Ireland Senior Football Championship. Historically, the captain was usually chosen from the club that won the Meath Senior Hurling Championship; however, in recent years, the captain has been appointed by the manager.

== List of captains ==
Year	Player	Club	National	Provincial
1949	Brian Smyth	Skryne	All-Ireland Football Final-winning captain	Leinster Football Final-winning captain
1950				
1951	Séamus Heery	Rathkenny		Leinster Football Final-winning captain
1952	Paddy Meegan	Syddan		Leinster Football Final-winning captain
1953	Tom Duff	Syddan		
1954	Peter McDermott	Navan O'Mahonys	All-Ireland Football Final-winning captain	Leinster Football Final-winning captain
1955	Tom O'Brien	Skryne		
1956				
1957				
1958				
1959				
1960				
1961				
1962				
1963	Peter Darby	Trim		
1964	Dinny Donnelly	Skryne		Leinster Football Final-winning captain
1965	Martin Quinn	Kilbride		
1966	Dave Carty	Skryne		Leinster Football Final-winning captain
1967	Peter Darby	Trim	All-Ireland Football Final-winning captain	Leinster Football Final-winning captain
1968	Jack Quinn	Kilbride		
1969				
1970	Jack Quinn	Kilbride		Leinster Football Final-winning captain
1971				
1972				
1973	Ollie Geraghty	Seneschalstown		
1974	Ronan Giles	Navan O'Mahonys		
1975				
1976				
1977				
1978				
1979				
1980				
1981				
1982				
1983				
1984				
1985				
1986	Joe Cassells	Navan O'Mahonys		Leinster Football Final-winning captain
1987	Mick Lyons	Summerhill	All-Ireland Football Final-winning captain	Leinster Football Final-winning captain
1988	Joe Cassells	Navan O'Mahonys	All-Ireland Football Final-winning captain	Leinster Football Final-winning captain
1989	Colm O'Rourke	Skryne		
1990	Colm O'Rourke	Skryne		Leinster Football Final-winning captain
1991	Liam Hayes	Skryne		Leinster Football Final-winning captain
1992				
1993				
1994	Robbie O'Malley	St Colmcille's		
1995	Martin O'Connell	St Michael's		
1996	Tommy Dowd	Dungerry	All-Ireland Football Final-winning captain	Leinster Football Final-winning captain
1997	John McDermott	Skryne		
1998	Brendan Reilly	St Peter's Dunboyne		
1999	Graham Geraghty	Seneschalstown	All-Ireland Football Final-winning captain	Leinster Football Final-winning captain
2000	Darren Fay	Trim		
2001	Trevor Giles	Skryne		Leinster Football Final-winning captain
2002	Trevor Giles	Skryne		
2003	Darren Fay	Trim		
2004	Paddy Reynolds	Walterstown		
2005	David Gallagher	St Peter's Dunboyne		
2006	Nigel Crawford	St Peter's Dunboyne		
2007	Brendan Murphy	Trim		
2008	Nigel Crawford	St Peter's Dunboyne		
2008	Nigel Crawford	St Peter's Dunboyne		
2010	Nigel Crawford	St Peter's Dunboyne		
2011	Séamus Kenny	Simonstown Gaels		
2012	Séamus Kenny	Simonstown Gaels		
2013	Kevin Reilly	Navan O'Mahonys		
2014	Kevin Reilly	Navan O'Mahonys		
2015	Donal Keogan	Rathkenny		
2016	Donal Keogan	Rathkenny		
2017	Graham Reilly	St Colmcille's		
2018	Bryan Menton	Donaghmore Ashbourne		
2019	Donal Keogan	Rathkenny		
2019	Bryan Menton	Donaghmore Ashbourne		
2020	Donal Keogan	Rathkenny		
2020	Bryan Menton	Donaghmore Ashbourne		
2021	Shane McEntee	Rathkenny		
