= 1949 All-Ireland Senior Football Championship final =

- Event: 1949 All-Ireland Senior Football Championship
Meath	Cavan
1–10 (13)	1–6 (9)
- Date: 25 September 1949
- Venue: Croke Park, Dublin
- Referee: D. Ryan (Kerry)
- Attendance: 79,460

The 1949 All-Ireland Senior Football Championship final was the 62nd All-Ireland Final and the deciding match of the 1949 All-Ireland Senior Football Championship, an inter-county Gaelic football tournament for the top teams in Ireland.

== Pre-match ==
Cavan were aiming for three consecutive All-Ireland SFC titles, having beaten Kerry at America's Polo Grounds in 1947 and Mayo at Croke Park in 1948. Meath had never won the All-Ireland SFC.

== Match ==
=== Summary ===
Meath led 0–7 to 0–3 at half-time, and were able to retain this four-point lead to the end, despite Cavan player Peter Donohoe scoring six points.

=== Details ===
==== Meath ====
- 1 K. Smyth
- 2 M. O'Brien
- 3 P. O'Brien
- 4 K. McConnell
- 5 S. Heery
- 6 P. Dixon
- 7 C. Hand
- 8 P. Connell
- 9 J. Kearney
- 10 F. Byrne
- 11 B. Smyth (c)
- 12 M. McDonnell
- 13 P. Meegan
- 14 B. Halpenny
- 15 P. McDermott

Sub used
P. Carolan for F. Byrne

Trainer
P. Tully
