= 1950 All-Ireland Senior Football Championship =

Football championship

Championship details
- Dates: April 30 – September 24, 1950
- Teams: 28

All-Ireland Champions
- Winning team: Mayo (2nd win)
- Captain: Sean Flanagan

All-Ireland Finalists
- Losing team: Louth
- Captain: Tom Conlon

Provincial Champions
- Munster: Kerry
- Leinster: Louth
- Ulster: Armagh
- Connacht: Mayo

Championship statistics
- No. matches played: 30

The 1950 All-Ireland Senior Football Championship was the 64th staging of Ireland's premier Gaelic football knock-out competition.

In the Leinster final Louth ended Meath's spell as All Ireland champions.

Mayo won their second All-Ireland.

== Results ==
=== Connacht Senior Football Championship ===
11 June 1950
Semi-final

Roscommon	0–10 – 1–4	Galway

St. Coman's Park, Roscommon

25 June 1950
Semi-final

Mayo	0–10 – 1–5	Sligo

James Stephens Park, Ballina

==== Connacht Final ====
16 July 1950
Final

Mayo	1–7 – 0–4	Roscommon
P Carney (0–4, three frees) & M Mulderrig (1–3).

Tuam Stadium, Tuam

=== Leinster Senior Football Championship ===
30 April 1950
Preliminary round

Longford	0–12 – 0–5	Westmeath

O'Connor Park, Tullamore

7 May 1950
Preliminary round

Kildare	2–11 – 1–9	Dublin
S.Brennan 0–4, L.O'Brien 1–1, J.Malone 0–3, P.Lyons 1–0, C.Hanlon, P.White, B.Edwards 0–1.

Cusack Park, Mullingar

14 May 1950
Preliminary round

Wicklow	2–4 – 0–6	Longford

St. Conleth's Park, Newbridge

21 May 1950
Quarter-final

Louth	1–7 – 1–6	Carlow

Croke Park, Dublin

28 May 1950
Quarter-final

Kildare	2–5 – 1–6	Offaly
B.Edwards 1–1, P.Lyons 1–0, P.White 0–2, S.Brennan, J.Malone 0–1.

O'Moore Park, Portlaoise
Attendance: 13,500
Referee: John Conroy (Laois)

4 June 1950
Quarter-final

Wexford	4–3 – 1–5	Laois

Dr. Cullen Park, Carlow
Attendance: 11,447

18 June 1950
Quarter-final

Meath	6–8 – 0–4	Wicklow

Croke Park, Dublin

25 June 1950
Semi-final

Louth	1–10 – 1–8	Kildare
		S.Brennan 0–4, P.White 1–1, C.Hanlon, B.Edwards. J.Malone 0–1.

Croke Park, Dublin

2 July 1950
Semi-final

Meath	1–5 – 0–6	Wexford

Croke Park, Dublin

==== Leinster Final ====
23 July 1950

Louth	1–03 – 1–03	Meath
Frank Reid 1–0, Nicky Roe 0–2 (0-1f), Stephen White 0–1		Mattie McDonnell 1–0, Brian Smyth 0–2, Mick O'Brien 0-1f

Croke Park, Dublin
Attendance: 36,202
Referee: John Conroy (Laois)

GK	1	Seán Thornton (Civil Service, Dublin)
RCB	2	Michael Byrne (St Bride's)
FB	3	Tom Conlon (Stabannon Parnells) (c)
LCB	4	Jim Tuft (Dundalk Young Irelands)
RHB	5	Seán Boyle (St Mary's)
CHB	6	Paddy Markey (St Mary's)
LHB	7	Paddy McArdle (St Mary's)
MF	8	Jack Regan (Dundalk Gaels)
MF	9	Frank Reid (Dundalk Gaels)
RHF	10	Michael McDonnell (Darver Volunteers)
CHF	11	Nicky Roe (St Mary's)
LHF	12	Stephen White (Dundalk Young Irelands)
RCF	13	Roger Lynch (Geraldines)
FF	14	Hubert Reynolds (Dundalk Gaels)
LCF	15	Mickey Reynolds (Stabannon Parnells)

GK	1	Bob Ruske (Dunboyne)
RCB	2	Paddy Dixon (Ballivor)
FB	3	Paddy O'Brien (Seán McDermott's, Dublin)
LCB	4	Kevin McConnell (Syddan)
RHB	5	Séamus Heery (North Meath)
CHB	6	John O'Brien (UCD, Dublin)
LHB	7	Christo Hand (Seán McDermott's, Dublin)
MF	8	Des Taaffe (St Mary's, Bettystown)
MF	9	Paddy Connell (Moynalty)
RHF	10	Frankie Byrne (Clanna Gael, Dublin)
CHF	11	Micheál O'Brien (Skryne)
LHF	12	Mattie McDonnell (Ballinlough)
RCF	13	Brian Smyth (Skryne)
FF	14	Larry McGuinness (North Meath)
LCF	15	Paddy Meegan (Syddan) (c)
Substitutes:
	16	Peter McDermott (Young Irelands) for Byrne

==== Leinster Final replay ====
6 August 1950

Louth	3–05 – 0–13	Meath
Nicky Roe 1–3 (0-3f), Hubert Reynolds 1–1, Mick Reynolds 1–0, Frank Reid 0–1		Mick O'Brien 0-5f, Mattie McDonnell 0–3 (0-1f), Paddy O'Brien (1 '50), Des Taaffe (0-1f), Paddy Connell, Paddy Meegan, Larry McGuinness 0–1 each

Croke Park, Dublin
Attendance: 35,000
Referee: Paddy Mythen (Wexford)

GK	1	Seán Thornton (Civil Service, Dublin)
RCB	2	Michael Byrne (St Bride's)
FB	3	Tom Conlon (Stabannon Parnells) (c)
LCB	4	Jim Tuft (Dundalk Young Irelands)
RHB	5	Ronan Lynch (Geraldines)
CHB	6	Paddy Markey (St Mary's)
LHB	7	Paddy McArdle (St Mary's)
MF	8	Jack Regan (Dundalk Gaels)
MF	9	Frank Reid (Dundalk Gaels)
RHF	10	Jimmy McDonnell (Darver Volunteers)
CHF	11	Nicky Roe (St Mary's)
LHF	12	Stephen White (Dundalk Young Irelands)
RCF	13	Roger Lynch (Geraldines)
FF	14	Hubert Reynolds (Dundalk Gaels)
LCF	15	Mickey Reynolds (Stabannon Parnells)
Substitutes:
	16	Seán Boyle (St Mary's) for Ronan Lynch

GK	1	Bob Ruske (Dunboyne)
RCB	2	Matt Maguire (Syddan)
FB	3	Paddy O'Brien (Seán McDermott's, Dublin)
LCB	4	Kevin McConnell (Syddan)
RHB	5	Séamus Heery (North Meath)
CHB	6	Paddy Dixon (Ballivor)
LHB	7	Christo Hand (Seán McDermott's, Dublin)
MF	8	Des Taaffe (St Mary's, Bettystown)
MF	9	Paddy Connell (Moynalty)
RHF	10	Brian Smyth (Skryne)
CHF	11	Mattie McDonnell (Ballinlough)
LHF	12	Paddy Meegan (Syddan) (c)
RCF	13	Micheál O'Brien (Skryne)
FF	14	Peter McDermott (Young Irelands)
LCF	15	Larry McGuinness (North Meath)
Substitutes:
	16	Gerry McArdle (Garda, Dublin) for Connell

=== Munster Senior Football Championship ===
2 July 1950
Quarter-final

Cork	3–8 – 2–2	Waterford
E. Young (2–2), D. Kellaher (0–1), J. O’Keefe (0–1) & P. O’Donnell (0–4).

Páirc MacGearailt, Fermoy

18 June 1950
Semi-final

Kerry	1–6 – 1–6	Clare
G. O'Sullivan (0–1), DJ McMahon (1–0), D. Kavanagh (0–1), P. McCarthy (0–1) & Batt Garvey (0–3).

Austin Stack Park, Tralee

16 July 1950
Semi-final replay

Kerry	6–6 – 2–4	Clare
T. O'Sullivan (2–3), G.O'Sullivan (0–1), M. Palmer (1–0), B. Garvey (1–2) & Sub P. Godley (1–0).

Gaelic Grounds, Limerick

16 July 1950
Semi-final

Cork	3–5 – 0–3	Tipperary
C. McGrath (0–3), J. Hartnett (1–0), P. O’Donavan (1–0) & E. Young (0–2).

Cork Athletic Grounds, Cork
Referee: M. Colbert (Limerick)

==== Munster Final ====
30 July 1950
Final

Kerry	2–5 – 1–5	Cork
T. O'Sullivan (0–2), P. Godley (0–1) & D. Kavanagh (2–1).		J. Hartnett (0–1), E. Young (0–1), J. Cronin (0–2) & D. Kellaher (1–1).

Cork Athletic Grounds, Cork

=== Ulster Senior Football Championship ===
4 June 1950
Quarter-final

Antrim	5–10 – 0–5	Derry

Corrigan Park, Belfast

11 June 1950
Quarter-final

Cavan	8–7 – 0–3	Tyrone
P Donohoe (3–5), T Tighe (2–0), Ed Carolan (2–2), J Cusack (1–0)		Fee (0–2), Campbell (0–1)

Fr. Peter Campbell Park, Coalisland

18 June 1950
Quarter-final

Down	2–8 – 3–5	Donegal

St. Patrick's Park, Newcastle

25 June 1950
Quarter-final

Armagh	0–14 – 1–5	Monaghan

St. Tiernach's Park, Clones
Attendance: 10,000

25 June 1950
Quarter-final replay

Down	4–3 – 1–7	Donegal

O'Donnell Park, Letterkenny

2 July 1950
Semi-final

Antrim	2–6 – 1–12	Cavan
Pa O Hara (2–1), Mc Callin (0–3), Dunlop (0–1), Gallagher (0–1)		P Donohoe (0–9), M Higgins (0–2), T Tighe (1–0), Ed Carolan (0–1)

St. Tiernach's Park, Clones
Attendance: 20,000

9 July 1950
Semi-final

Armagh	1–8 – 1–7	Down

O'Neill Park, Dungannon
Attendance: 5,800

==== Ulster Final ====
23 July 1950
Final

Armagh	1–11 – 1–7	Cavan
G O Neill (0–4), D Slevin (0–2), M Mc Evoy (0–3) J M Breen (0–2), W Mc Corry (1–0)		P Donohoe (0–4), M Higgins (0–2), Ed Carolan (0–1), P Brady (1–0)

St. Tiernach's Park, Clones
Attendance: 30,000
Referee: M. McArdle, (Louth)

=== All-Ireland Senior Football Championship ===
13 August 1950
Semi-final

Mayo	3–9 – 0–6	Armagh
P Carney (0–1, free), M Flanagan (0–1), W Kenny (0–1, free), J Gilvarry (0–1); M Mulderrig (0–2), T Langan (2–3) & P Solan (1–0).

Croke Park, Dublin
Attendance: 49,281

20 August 1950
Semi-final

Louth	1–7 – 0–8	Kerry
S. Boyle (0–1), J. McDonnell (0–5, 2f), F. Reid (0–1), P. Smith (1–0)		T. O'Sullivan (0–1), M. Palmer (0–1), P. McCarthy (0–1), B. Garvey (0–4) & Sub G. O'Sullivan (0–1).

Croke Park, Dublin
Attendance: 50,672
Referee: Simon Deignan (Cavan)

GK	1	Seán Thornton (Civil Service, Dublin)
RCB	2	Michael Byrne (St Bride's)
FB	3	Tom Conlon (Stabannon Parnells) (c)
LCB	4	Jim Tuft (Dundalk Young Irelands)
RHB	5	Seán Boyle (St Mary's)
CHB	6	Paddy Markey (St Mary's)
LHB	7	Paddy McArdle (St Mary's)
MF	8	Jack Regan (Dundalk Gaels)
MF	9	Frank Reid (Dundalk Gaels)
RHF	10	Jimmy McDonnell (Darver Volunteers)
CHF	11	Nicky Roe (St Mary's)
LHF	12	Stephen White (Dundalk Young Irelands)
RCF	13	Roger Lynch (Geraldines)
FF	14	Hubert Reynolds (Dundalk Gaels)
LCF	15	Mickey Reynolds (Stabannon Parnells)
Substitutes:
	16	Peadar Smith (Oliver Plunketts) for Roe

GK	1	Liam Fitzgerald (St Brendan's)
RCB	2	James Murphy (Garda, Cork)
FB	3	Paddy Bawn Brosnan (Dingle)
LCB	4	Donie Murphy (Killarney Legion)
RHB	5	Mick Finucane (Ballydonoghue)
CHB	6	Jackie Lyne (Killarney Legion)
LHB	7	Teddy O'Connor (Dr Crokes) (c)
MF	8	Eddie Dowling (Ballydonoghue)
MF	9	Jim Brosnan (UCC, Cork)
RHF	10	Teddy O'Sullivan (Garda, Dublin)
CHF	11	Mixie Palmer (Kenmare)
LHF	12	Pat Godley (St Brendan's)
RCF	13	Dan Kavanagh (Dr Crokes)
FF	14	Phil McCarthy (Churchill)
LCF	15	Batt Garvey (Geraldines, Dublin)
Substitutes:
	16	Gerald O'Sullivan (St Mary's) for Godley

==== All Ireland Final ====
24 September 1950
Final

Mayo	2–5 – 1–6	Louth
E Mongey (0–2), M Flanagan (1–0), J Gilvarry (0–1), M Mulderrig (0–2) & P Solan (1–0).		Nicky Roe (1–5) & Jimmy McDonnell (0–1).

Croke Park, Dublin
Attendance: 76,174
Referee: Simon Deignan (Cavan)

== Championship statistics ==
=== Miscellaneous ===
- The Connacht final between Mayo and Roscommon took place at the new Tuam Stadium, in Tuam.
- Armagh end a 47-year wait by winning their first Ulster title since 1903.
- The All Ireland semi-final between Mayo and Armagh was their first championship meeting.
- Mayo end a 14-year period by winning their second All Ireland title.
