= 1952 All-Ireland Senior Football Championship final =

- Event: 1952 All-Ireland Senior Football Championship
Cavan	Meath
2–4 (10)	1–7 (10)
- Date: 28 September 1952
- Venue: Croke Park, Dublin
- Referee: Sean Hayes (Tipperary)
- Attendance: 64,200

1952 All-Ireland Senior Football Championship final replay
Cavan	Meath
0–9	0–5
- Date: 12 October 1952
- Venue: Croke Park, Dublin
- Referee: Sean Hayes (Tipperary)
- Attendance: 62,515

The 1952 All-Ireland Senior Football Championship final was the 65th All-Ireland Final and the deciding match of the 1952 All-Ireland Senior Football Championship, an inter-county Gaelic football tournament for the top teams in Ireland.

Mick Higgins was Cavan's captain on the day.

== Match 1 ==
=== Summary ===
Cavan equalised with a strange point — Edwin Carolan chased a ball that seemed to go wide, and kicked it across the goalmouth and over the bar. Carolan's equaliser has been described as a "wonder score".

=== Details ===
28 September 1952
Final

Cavan	2–4 – 1–7	Meath
T Tighe & J J Cassidy (1–0), M Higgins, V Sherlock, P Fitsmons & E Carolan (0–1) each		P Meegan (0–4), P McDermott (1–1), J Reilly & McDonnell (0–1) each

Croke Park, Dublin
Attendance: 64,200
Referee: Sean Hayes (Tipperary)

== Match 2 ==
=== Summary ===
Mick Higgins's five points won the replay for Cavan, while Peter McDermott (Meath) missed an easy goal chance.

=== Details ===
12 October 1952
Final replay

Cavan	0–9 – 0–5	Meath
M Higgins (0–7), T Tighe & J Cusack (0–1) each		P McDermott (0–2), J Reilly, M McDonnell & D Taaffe (0–1) each

Croke Park, Dublin
Attendance: 62,515
Referee: Sean Hayes (Tipperary)

==== Meath ====
- 1 Kevin Smyth
- 2 Micheál O'Brien
- 3 Paddy O'Brien
- 4 Kevin McConnell
- 5 T. O'Brien
- 6 Connie Kelly
- 7 Christo Hand
- 8 Brendan Maguire
- 9 Des Taaffe
- 10 Declan Brennan
- 11 Brian Smyth
- 12 Paddy Meegan (c)
- 13 Mattie McDonnell
- 14 Jim Reilly
- 15 Peter McDermott

Played in drawn game
Patsy McGearty
Paddy Connell

Trainer
Patrick Tully

== Post-match ==
Cavan haven't appeared in an All-Ireland SFC final since.
