= Frankie Byrne (Gaelic footballer) =

Irish Gaelic footballer (1924–2019)

Personal information
- Native name: Prionsias Ó Broin (Irish)
- Born: May 1924 Navan, County Meath, Ireland
- Died: 8 February 2019 (aged 94) Clontarf, Dublin, Ireland
- Occupation: Primary school teacher
- Height: 5 ft 8 in (173 cm)

Sport
- Sport: Gaelic football
- Position: Right wing-forward
Clubs
- Years: Club
- Navan Parnells; Erin's Hope; Clann na nGael; Navan O'Mahonys
Club titles
- Meath titles: 2
Inter-county
- Years: County
- 1943–1955: Meath
Inter-county titles
- Leinster titles: 4
- All-Irelands: 2
- NFL: 2

Frankie Byrne (May 1924 – 8 February 2019) was an Irish Gaelic footballer who played as a right wing-forward for the Meath county team.

Byrne made his senior début during the 1943 championship. He went on to play a key role during a golden age for Meath, and won one All-Ireland medal, three Leinster medals and two National League medals. He was an All-Ireland runner-up on one occasion.

== Honours ==
Navan Parnells

- Meath Senior Football Championship (1): 1946

Navan O'Mahonys

- Meath Senior Football Championship (1): 1953

Meath

- All-Ireland Senior Football Championship (2): 1949, 1954
- Leinster Senior Football Championship (4): 1947, 1949, 1951, 1952
- National Football League (2): 1945-46, 1950-51
