= Paddy O'Brien (Gaelic footballer) =

Irish Gaelic footballer

Paddy "Hands" O'Brien
Personal information
- Native name: Pádraig Ó Brian (Irish)
- Nickname: Hands
- Born: 1925 Skryne, County Meath, Ireland
- Died: 26 March 2016 (aged 91) Santry, Dublin, Ireland

Sport
- Sport: Gaelic football
- Position: Full-back
Clubs
- Years: Club
- Skryne; Oberstown; Seán McDermotts
Club titles
- Meath titles: 2
Inter-county
- Years: County
- 1944–1955: Meath
Inter-county titles
- Leinster titles: 5
- All-Irelands: 2
- NFL: 2

Paddy "Hands" O'Brien (1925 – 26 March 2016) was an Irish Gaelic footballer who played as a full-back at senior level for the Meath county team.

Born in Skryne, County Meath, O'Brien was introduced to Gaelic football at Skryne National School under the tutelage of schoolmaster Brian Smyth. Gaelic football competitions were curtailed during the Emergency, however, he made his senior début with the Skryne club in 1942. A two-time championship medal winner with Skryne, O'Brien also enjoyed championship success with Seán McDermotts in Dublin.

O'Brien made his senior début during the 1944 Leinster League. He went on to play a key role during a golden age for Meath and won two All-Ireland medals, five Leinster medals and two National League medals. He was an All-Ireland runner-up on two occasions.

As a member of the Leinster inter-provincial team, O'Brien won three Railway Cup medals. He retired from inter-county football following the conclusion of the 1955 championship.

O'Brien is widely regarded as one of the greatest Gaelic footballers in the history of the game. He has been repeatedly voted onto teams made up of the sport's greats, including at full-back on the Gaelic Football Team of the Century in 1984 and the Gaelic Football Team of the Millennium in 2000.

== Playing career ==
=== Club ===
O'Brien made his senior championship début with Skryne in 1942. He was at corner-forward that year as Skryne faced Donaghmore in the decider. A 1-8 to 0-2 defeat was the result on that occasion.

Two years later in 1944, Skryne reached the decider once again where they faced Navan Parnells. After two exciting draws, Skryne were successful at the third attempt, with O'Brien scoring 1-1. It was his first championship medal.

Skryne were successful in retaining the title in 1945. A huge 3-17 to 2-4 defeat of Oldcastle gave O'Brien a second championship medal.

Work commitments brought O'Brien to Dublin in 1946. Here he joined the Seán McDermotts club where his brothers Vincent and Cyril also played. In 1947 O'Brien captained the club to championship success.

=== Inter-county ===
The suspension of the minor championship during the Emergency delayed O'Brien's inter-county début, and it was 1944 before he made his first appearance for the senior team in the Leinster League against Louth.

O'Brien enjoyed his first major success in 1946 when Meath defeated Wexford by 2-2 to 0-6 to secure the National Football League.

In 1947 O'Brien won his first Leinster medal following a 3-7 to 1-7 defeat of reigning provincial champions Laois.

After surrendering their provincial title in 1948, Meath bounced back the following year with O'Brien collecting a second Leinster medal following a 4-5 to 0-6 defeat of Westmeath. On 25 September 1949, Meath faced three-in-a-row hopefuls Cavan in the All-Ireland final. The northerners were overly reliant on Peter Donohoe who scored all six of their points with five coming from placed balls. Bill Halfpenny scored Meath's goal in the second half, however, Mick Higgins responded immediately with a goal for Cavan, however, it wasn't enough as Meath secured the title with a 1-10 to 1-6 victory. It was O'Brien's first All-Ireland medal.

Meath surrendered their titles to Louth the following year, however, they bounced back by reclaiming the provincial title in 1951. The 4-9 to 0-3 defeat of Laois gave O'Brien his third Leinster medal. On 23 September 1951, Meath faced reigning champions Mayo in the All-Ireland decider. Two first-half goals from Tommy Langan and Joe Gilvarry and three points in the last five minutes from Pádraig Carney gave Mayo a 2-8 to 0-9 victory. There was some compensation a week later when O'Brien claimed the National Football League title. The 1-10 to 0-10 defeat of New York gave O'Brien a second league medal.

O'Brien won a fourth Leinster medal in 1952 as Meath defeated Louth to take the provincial crown. On 28 September 1952, Meath faced old rivals Cavan in the All-Ireland final. With time almost up Meath looked like they had just done enough to merit a one-point victory, however, Cavan's Edwin Carolan chased a ball that appeared to go over the end line and kicked it across the goal. The ball hit the far post and rebounded over the bar to secure a 2-4 to 1-7 draw. The replay on 12 October 1953 was also a close affair. Paddy Meegan missed three vital frees for Meath, while Cavan's Mick Higgins scored seven points in all. Peter McDermott missed a great chance towards the end when he shot wide with just the Cavan goalkeeper to beat. The 0-9 to 0-5 score line resulted in defeat for O'Brien's side.

Three successive provincial titles proved beyond Meath, however, the team returned once more in 1954. A 4-7 to 2-10 defeat of Offaly gave O'Brien a fifth Leinster medal. On 26 September 1954, Kerry opposed Meath in the All-Ireland decider. Tom Moriarty's 20th-minute goal sealed victory for Meath when Peter McDermott's shot was saved but rebounded to the waiting Moriarty who finished to the net. John Sheehan pegged one back for Kerry two minutes before the interval, however, it wasn't enough for Kerry as Meath secured a 1-13 to 1-7 victory. It was his second All-Ireland medal.

Meath surrendered their championship titles to Dublin in 1955 and O'Brien retired from inter-county football.

=== Inter-provincial ===
In 1953 O'Brien was chosen at full-back on the Leinster inter-provincial team for the first time. A 2-9 to 0-6 defeat of southern rivals Munster gave O'Brien his first Railway Cup medal.

O'Brien was picked at full-back once again in 1954, as Connacht provided the opposition in the decider. A narrow 1-7 to 1-5 victory gave O'Brien a second successive Railway Cup medal.

In 1955 O'Brien was appointed the captain of his province, as Leinster faced Connacht for the second successive year. A close game developed once again, however, Leinster triumphed by 1-14 to 1-10. Not only was it O'Brien's third Railway Cup medal but he also had the honour of lifting the cup.

== Honours ==
Skryne

- Meath Senior Football Championship (2): 1944, 1945

Seán McDermotts

- Dublin Senior Football Championship (1): 1947

Meath

- All-Ireland Senior Football Championship (2): 1949, 1954
- Leinster Senior Football Championship (5): 1947, 1949, 1951, 1952, 1954
- National Football League (2): 1945-46, 1950-51

Leinster

- Railway Cup (3): 1953, 1954, 1955

Sporting positions
Preceded by Stephen White (Leinster)	Railway Cup Football Final winning captain 1955	Succeeded by Séamus Morris (Ulster)
