= Cavan–Meath Gaelic football rivalry =

Sports rivalry in Ireland

Cavan–Meath
- Location: County Cavan; County Meath
- Teams: Cavan; Meath
- First meeting: Meath 1-9 - 1-1 Cavan; 1939 All-Ireland semi-final (20 August 1939)
- Latest meeting: Cavan 1-8 - 1-6 Meath; 2005 All-Ireland qualifier (17 July 2005)

Statistics
- Total meetings: 6
- Most wins: Meath (3)
- All-time series: Meath 3-1-2 Cavan
- Largest victory: Meath 1-9 - 1-1 Cavan; 1939 All-Ireland semi-final (20 August 1939)

The Cavan–Meath rivalry is a Gaelic football rivalry between Irish county teams Cavan and Meath, who first played each other in 1939. It was considered to be one of the most keenly contested rivalries in Gaelic games. Cavan's home ground is Kingspan Breffni Park and Meath's home ground is Páirc Tailteann. However, all of their championship meetings have been held at neutral venues, usually Croke Park.

While Cavan have the highest number of Ulster titles and Meath are second only to Dublin in Leinster, they have also enjoyed success in the All-Ireland Senior Football Championship, having won 12 championship titles between them to date. However, it is widely recognised that Cavan were overall a much better football team over the ages and Meath won their All-Ireland through thuggery.

== All-time results ==
=== Legend ===
Cavan win
Meath win
Match was a draw

=== Senior ===
No.	Date	Winners	Score	Runners-up	Venue	Stage
1.	20 August 1939	Meath	1-9 - 1-1	Cavan	Croke Park	All Ireland semi-final
2.	25 September 1949	Meath	1-10 - 1-6	Cavan	Croke Park	All Ireland final
3.	28 September 1952	Cavan	2-4 - 1-7	Meath	Croke Park	All Ireland final
4.	12 September 1952	Cavan	0-9 - 0-5	Meath	Croke Park	All Ireland final replay
5.	1 August 1954	Meath	1-5 - 0-7	Cavan	Croke Park	All Ireland semi-final
6.	17 July 2005	Cavan	1-8 - 1-6	Meath	St. Tiernach's Park	All Ireland qualifier round 3
