= Johnny Cusack =

Cavan Gaelic footballer (1927–2020)

Personal information
- Native name: Seán Ó Cíosóg (Irish)
- Born: 1927 Lavey, County Cavan, Ireland
- Died: 10 July 2020 (aged 92) Lavey, County Cavan, Ireland
- Occupation: Farmer
- Height: 5 ft 11 in (180 cm)

Sport
- Sport: Gaelic football
- Position: Left corner-forward
Club
- Years: Club
- Lavey
Club titles
- Cavan titles: 1
Inter-county
- Years: County
- 1949–1955: Cavan
Inter-county titles
- Ulster titles: 4
- All-Irelands: 1
- NFL: 0

John Cusack (1927 – 10 July 2020) was an Irish Gaelic footballer. At club level he had success with Lavey and was an All-Ireland winner with the Cavan county team in the 1952 All-Ireland Senior Football Championship.

== Playing career ==
A farmer by trade, Cusack was regarded as a versatile player who could line out in defence or attack. After lining out for the Cavan minor team, his promotion to the senior team was delayed when he was sidelined with injury in the 1947 and 1948 All-Ireland Senior Football Championships. Cusack was selected for the senior team for the 1949 All-Ireland competition, in which he claimed his first Ulster Senior Football Championship medal before losing the 1949 All-Ireland final to Meath. Club success followed, when Cusack's Lavey club made history by winning Cavan Junior and Cavan Senior Championships in the same calendar year in 1951. He won a second Ulster Championship medal with Cavan in the 1952 All-Ireland Senior Football Championship, before winning an All-Ireland medal after a replay win over Meath. After being called up to the Ulster inter-provincial team in 1953 and 1954, Cusack claimed further Ulster Championship medals in 1954 and 1955.

== Honours ==
=== Player ===
Lavey

- Cavan Senior Football Championship (1): 1951
- Cavan Junior Football Championship (1): 1950

Cavan

- All-Ireland Senior Football Championship (1): 1952
- Ulster Senior Football Championship (4): 1949, 1952, 1954, 1955

=== Trainer ===
Lavey

- Cavan Junior Football Championship (2): 1950, 1975
