= Donie Murphy =

Irish Gaelic footballer

Personal information
- Native name: Dónall Ó Murchú (Irish)
- Born: 1929 Killarney, County Kerry, Ireland
- Died: 16 April 2010 (aged 80) Castlebar, County Mayo, Ireland
- Occupation: Agricultural instructor
- Height: 6 ft 0 in (183 cm)

Sport
- Sport: Gaelic football
- Position: Left corner-back
Clubs
- Years: Club
- Killarney Legion; Dick Fitzgeralds; Clann na nGael
Club titles
- Kerry titles: 2
College
- Years: College
- University College Galway
College titles
- Sigerson titles: 1
Inter-county
Years	County	Apps (scores)
1948-1955	Kerry	14 (0-00)
Inter-county titles
- Munster titles: 6
- All-Irelands: 1
- NFL: 0

Donal Murphy (1929 – 16 April 2010) was an Irish Gaelic footballer who played at club level with Killarney Legion and at inter-county level with the Kerry senior football team. He usually lined out as a defender.

== Career ==
Murphy first came to Gaelic football prominence as a member of the Killarney Legion club, with whom he won a County Championship title in 1946. He later won a Sigerson Cup title with University College Galway in 1949 before winning a second County Championship title with the Dick Fitzgeralds club in 1951. Murphy first appeared on the inter-county scene during a two-year stint with the Kerry minor football team and won an All-Ireland Minor Championship title in 1946. He was drafted onto the Kerry senior football team in 1948, however, his career was blighted by illness. A bout of pleurisy in 1951 necessitated a six-week stay in hospital and left a legacy which would later end his career. Murphy claimed an All-Ireland Championship title in 1953 after a defeat of Armagh in the final. His other honours include six Munster Championship medals and inclusion on the Munster team on a number of occasions. Murphy's inter-county career ended abruptly after the 1955 Munster final when a bout of tuberculosis resulted in a 17-month period of hospitalisation. He returned to club activity with Legion before later winning consecutive County Championship titles with the Clann na nGael club in Kilkenny. Murphy also made an inter-county return as a member of the Kilkenny junior football team in 1964.

== Personal life and death ==
Murphy worked as an agricultural advisor with the Department of Agriculture in counties Kerry, Limerick and Kilkenny before settling in Castlebar, County Mayo in 1968. He retired from this position in 1988.

Murphy died in Castlebar on 16 April 2010.

== Honours ==
University College Galway

- Sigerson Cup: 1949

Killarney Legion

- Kerry Senior Football Championship: 1948

Dick Fitzgeralds

- Kerry Senior Football Championship: 1951

Clann na nGael

- Kilkenny Senior Football Championship: 1963, 1964

Kerry

- All-Ireland Senior Football Championship: 1953
- Munster Senior Football Championship: 1948, 1950, 1951, 1953, 1954, 1955
- All-Ireland Minor Football Championship: 1946
- Munster Minor Football Championship: 1946, 1947
