= Kevin McConnell =

Irish Gaelic footballer

Personal information
- Native name: Caoimhín Mac Dhónaill (Irish)
- Born: 1924 Castletown, County Meath, Ireland
- Died: 16 April 2009 (aged 84) Kilmainhamwood, County Meath, Ireland
- Occupation: Dairy farmer

Sport
- Sport: Gaelic football
- Position: Left corner-back
Clubs
- Years: Club
- Castletown; Syddan
Club titles
- Meath titles: 3
Inter-county
- Years: County
- 1945-1955: Meath
Inter-county titles
- Leinster titles: 5
- All-Irelands: 2
- NFL: 2

Kevin McConnell (1924 – 16 April 2009) was an Irish Gaelic footballer who played as a right corner-back at senior level for the Meath county team.

Born in Castletown, County Meath, McConnell was introduced to Gaelic football in his youth. Gaelic football competitions were curtailed during the Emergency, however, he enjoyed success on the club front, winning a championship medal with Casteltown. McConnell later joined the Syddan club with whom he won three championship medals.

McConnell became a regular member of the Meath senior team during the 1945 championship. He went on to play a key role during a golden age for Meath, and won two All-Ireland medals, five Leinster medals and two National League medals. He was an All-Ireland runner-up on two occasions.

As a member of the Leinster inter-provincial team, McConnell won four Railway Cup medals. He retired from inter-county football following the conclusion of the 1955 championship.

In retirement from playing McConnell became involved in team management and the administrative affairs of the GAA. He was chairman of the Castletown club and a delegate to the Meath County Board. McConnell was also a selector on the Meath All-Ireland winning team of 1967. He also enjoyed a political career, serving as a Fine Gael councillor with Meath County Council between 1955 and 1979.

McConnell's son, Kevin McConnell, Jnr, played with Meath during the 1970s, while his grandson, Ross McConnell, was an All-Ireland medal winner with Dublin in 2011.

== Honours ==
Castletown

- Meath Intermediate Football Championship (1): 1946

Syddan

- Meath Senior Football Championship (3): 1949, 1951, 1952

Meath

- All-Ireland Senior Football Championship (2): 1949, 1954
- Leinster Senior Football Championship (5): 1947, 1949, 1951, 1952, 1954
- National Football League (2): 1945-46, 1950-51

Leinster

- Railway Cup (4): 1952, 1953, 1954, 1955
