= Peter McDermott (Gaelic footballer) =

Irish Gaelic footballer

Personal information
- Native name: Peadar Mac Diarmada (Irish)
- Nickname: The man in the cap
- Born: 27 July 1918 Belgooly, County Cork, Ireland
- Died: 11 October 2011 (aged 93) Navan, County Meath, Ireland
- Occupation: Egg merchant
- Height: 5 ft 10 in (178 cm)

Sport
- Sport: Gaelic football
- Position: Left corner-forward
Clubs
- Years: Club
- Rathfeigh; Donaghmore; Navan O'Mahony's
Club titles
- Meath titles: 3
Inter-county
Years	County	Apps (scores)
1940-1954	Meath	51
Inter-county titles
- Leinster titles: 6
- All-Irelands: 2
- NFL: 2
- All Stars: 1

Peter McDermott (27 July 1918 – 11 October 2011) was an Irish Gaelic football player, coach, administrator and referee. Throughout a club career that spanned over 20 years, he played for several clubs and enjoyed championship success in different grades with Rathfeigh, Donaghmore and Navan O'Mahony's. At inter-county level, he was left corner-forward on the Meath senior football team that won All-Ireland Championship titles in 1949 and 1954 as team captain; he was the first Meath player to win six Leinster Championship medals and also claimed two National League titles. His 51 championship appearances stood as a Meath record for nearly 40 years. As well as club and county successes, McDermott was a regular for Leinster and won three Railway Cup medals.

McDermott's inter-county career was congruous with a career as a top-ranking referee and he took charge of All-Ireland finals in 1953 and 1956. As an administrator, he served as secretary, vice-chairman and president of the Meath County Board and was instrumental in organising a prototype International Compromise Rules Series in 1968. McDermott's coaching career stretched back to the 1940s before enjoying All-Ireland success with Down in 1960 and Meath in 1967. Regarded as one of Meath's greatest-ever servants, he received the All-Time All-Star Award in 1989 and was inducted into the GAA Hall of Fame in 2002.

== Playing career ==
=== Club ===
McDermott first sampled Gaelic football while attending Cushinstown national school. After a period playing with Ardcath in the Fingal League, he subsequently lined out with Rathfeigh and captained the team to the County Minor Championship title in 1936. After lining out for Skryne in a friendly match, McDermott opted to join the Donaghmore club after the break-up of Rathfeigh. In his first year with the "Moore's" in 1938, they won the County Intermediate Championship title by beating a Oldcastle in the final. Four years later the Donaghmore club secured the County Senior Championship title when a team, captained by McDermott, beat Skryne by 1-08 to 0-02 in the 1942 final.

A move to Navan in 1950 saw McDermott join the O'Mahony's club in the town and he helped his adopted club to win their first County Championship title in 1953. By the time the O'Mahony's club regained the title, McDermott's career was coming to an end. In 1957 he made his last club appearance when he lined out in goal in a one-point defeat of Skryne in the 1957 final.

=== Inter-county ===
Success at club level resulted in McDermott being drafted onto the Meath junior team for the 1939 Leinster Junior Championship. Meath came close to securing the provincial title but were held to a draw by Dublin before being beaten in the final replay. McDermott, who played well in the drawn match but had, by his own admission, "a poor game in the replay" and was not among the members of the junior panel who were subsequently invited onto the senior team.

McDermott was drafted onto the Meath senior football team during the latter stages of the 1939–40 National Football League and he made his debut in a semi-final defeat of Wexford at Páirc Tailteann. After losing the final to Galway, he won his first Leinster Championship title after nullifying the influence of Tommy Murphy in the 2-07 to 1-07 defeat of Laois in the provincial final.

McDermott claimed his second national silverware when Meath beat Wexford to win the 1945–46 National Football League title. He won a second Leinster Championship title in 1947 after a 3-07 to 1-07 win over Laois. After surrendering the title the following year, McDermott claimed his third provincial winners' medal after scoring two goals in the 4-05 to 0-06 defeat of Westmeath in the 1949 Leinster final. He was once again selected at left corner-forward for the 1949 All-Ireland final against cavan and claimed his first winners' medal after the 1-10 to 1-06 victory in what was Meath's inaugural championship title.

After surrendering their provincial and national titles to Louth in the 1950 Leinster final, McDermott won a fourth provincial winners' medal the following year after an 18-point defeat of Laois. He later made his second All-Ireland final appearance, however, Meath suffered a 2-08 to 0-09 defeat by Mayo. Meath retained the provincial title after a one-point defeat of Louth in the 1952 Leinster final, with McDermott winning a fifth provincial medal. He later made his third 1952 All-Ireland final appearance, however, after an initial draw Cavan claimed the title after a 0-09 to 0-05 victory.

Three provincial titles in a row proved beyond Meath in 1953, however, 35-year-old McDermott continued to line out with the team during the 1954 Leinster Championship. In the final against Offaly he came on as a substitute for the injured team captain Tom Duff, scored two goals and collected his sixth winners' medal after the 4-07 to 2-10 victory. McDermott assumed the team captaincy for the remainder of the championship, including the 1954 All-Ireland final against Kerry. He ended the game with a second All-Ireland winners' medal after the 1-13 to 1-07 victory, while he also had the honour of lifting the Sam Maguire Cup.

== Honours ==
=== Player ===
Rathfeigh

- Meath Minor Football Championship

Donaghmore

- Meath Senior Football Championship: 1942
- Meath Intermediate Football Championship: 1938

Navan O'Mahony's

- Meath Senior Football Championship: 1953, 1957

Meath

- All-Ireland Senior Football Championship: 1949, 1954 (c)
- Leinster Senior Football Championship: 1940, 1947, 1949, 1951, 1952, 1954
- National Football League: 1945–46, 1950–51

Leinster

- Railway Cup: 1944, 1945, 1953

=== Coach/selector ===
Down

- All-Ireland Senior Football Championship: 1960
- All-Ireland Junior Football Championship: 1946
- Ulster Junior Football Championship: 1946

Meath

- All-Ireland Senior Football Championship: 1954, 1967
- Leinster Senior Football Championship: 1954, 1966, 1967

Sporting positions
Preceded by Tom Duff	Meath Senior Football Captain; 1954	Succeeded by Tom O'Brien
Achievements
Preceded by Jas Murphy	All-Ireland Senior Football Final winning captain 1954	Succeeded by John Dowling
