= Syddan GAA =

Gaelic sports club in County Meath, Ireland

Syddan
- Sódan
- Founded: 1884
- County: Meath
- Colours
- Grounds: Syddan GAA Club

Playing kits
Standard colours

Senior Club Championships
| | All Ireland | Leinster champions | Meath champions |
|---|---|---|---|
| Football: | 0 | 0 | 4 |

Syddan GAA is a Gaelic Athletic Association club in Lobinstown, County Meath, Ireland. The club is affiliated to the Meath County Board and fields teams primarily in Gaelic football.

== History ==
Located in the village of Lobinstown, approximately 19 km from Navan, Syddan GAA was founded in 1884. In 1945 Syddan and a small club in Lobinstown merged into one to form the current GAA club. The Keegan Cup, the award for winning the Meath SFC, was presented by Syddan GAA to the Meath County Board in 1953 in honour of Tom Keegan, who suffered a fatal injury while playing for Syddan in 1940.

Syddan's first Meath SFC final was in 1948 against Skryne, who beat them 4–10 to 2-05. What followed was a period of dominance that spanned eight years where they won 4 SFC titles. Their first was in 1949, followed by wins in 1951, 1952, and 1956. Syddan contested a Meath SFC final in 1980, where they were defeated by Walterstown by 15 points.

Syddan have won 2 Meath IFC titles, each in 1941 and 1999. The last county final they contested, as of 2026, was in the Meath IFC against Duleek in 2005, losing by 1 point.

Syddan currently play within the Meath JFC as of 2026.

== Honours ==
- Meath Senior Football Championship (4): 1949, 1951, 1952, 1956 (runners-up in 1948, 1980)
- Meath Intermediate Football Championship (2): 1941, 1999 (runners-up in 1940, 2005)
- Meath Junior 'A' Football Championship (1): 1927

== Notable Players ==
- Kevin McConnell: All-Ireland SFC-winner (1949, 1954)
- Paddy Meegan: All-Ireland SFC-winner (1949, 1954)

| Preceded by St Vincent's | Meath Senior Football Champions; 1956 | Succeeded by Navan O'Mahonys |
