= Micheál O'Brien =

Irish Gaelic footballer and hurler

Personal information
- Native name: Micheál Ó Briain (Irish)
- Born: June 1923 Skryne, County Meath, Ireland
- Died: 14 May 2015 (aged 91) Stamullen, County Meath, Ireland

Sport
- Sport: Gaelic football
- Position: Left corner-back
Club
- Years: Club
- Skryne
Club titles
- Meath titles: 6
Inter-county
- Years: County
- 1942-1955: Meath
Inter-county titles
- Leinster titles: 4
- All-Irelands: 2
- NFL: 1

Micheál O'Brien (June 1923 – 14 May 2015) was an Irish Gaelic footballer and hurler who played at senior level for the Meath county team.

Born in Skryne, County Meath, O'Brien first played competitive Gaelic games in his youth. He arrived on the inter-county scene at the age of nineteen when he first linked up with the Meath senior team before later joining the junior hurling side. He made his senior debut during the 1942 championship. O'Brien immediately became a regular member of the starting fifteen and won two All-Ireland medals, four Leinster medals and one National Football League medal. He was an All-Ireland runner-up on two occasions.

As a member of the Leinster inter-provincial team on a number of occasions O'Brien won four Railway Cup medals. At club level he was a six-time championship medallist with Skryne.

His cousin, Paddy "Hands" O'Brien was also an All-Ireland medallist with Meath.

O'Brien retired from inter-county football following the conclusion of the 1955 championship.

== Honours ==
=== Team ===
Skryne

- Meath Senior Football Championship (6): 1941, 1944, 1945, 1947, 1948, 1954

Meath

- All-Ireland Senior Football Championship (2): 1949, 1954
- Leinster Senior Football Championship (4): 1949, 1951, 1952, 1954
- National Football League (1): 1950-51
- All-Ireland Junior Hurling Championship (1): 1948
- Leinster Junior Hurling Championship (1): 1948

Leinster

- Railway Cup (4): 1952, 1953, 1954, 1955
