= John Cusack (disambiguation) =

John Cusack (born 1966) is an American actor, producer, and screenwriter.

John Cusack can also refer to:

- John F. Cusack (1937–2014), American politician from Massachusetts
- John Cusack (Australian politician) (1868–1956), Australian politician
- John Cusack (hurler) (1925–2002), Irish hurler, active in the 1940s and 1950s
- John Bede Cusack, pseudonym John Beede, author, younger brother of Dymphna Cusack
- Johnny Cusack (1927–2020), Irish Gaelic footballer
