= Kerry–Meath Gaelic football rivalry =

Sports rivalry in Ireland

Kerry-Meath
- Location: County Kerry; County Meath
- Teams: Kerry; Meath
- First meeting: Kerry 2-5 - 2-3 Meath; 1939 All-Ireland final (24 September 1939)
- Latest meeting: Meath 1-22 - 0-16 Kerry; 2025 All-Ireland Senior Football Championship Round 3 (14 June 2025)

Statistics
- Total meetings: 9
- Most wins: Kerry (6)
- All-time series: Kerry 6-3 Meath
- Largest victory: Meath 2-14 - 0-5 Kerry; 2001 All-Ireland semi-final (2 September 2001)

The Kerry-Meath rivalry is a Gaelic football rivalry between Irish county teams Kerry and Meath, who first played each other in 1939. Kerry's home ground is Fitzgerald Stadium and Meath's home ground is Páirc Tailteann; however, all but one of their championship meetings have been held at neutral venues, usually Croke Park.

While Kerry have the highest number of Munster titles and Meath are second to Dublin in Leinster, they have also enjoyed success in the All-Ireland Senior Football Championship, having won 44 championship titles between them to date.

== Statistics ==
Team	All-Ireland	Provincial	National League	Total
Kerry	37	81	19	137
Meath	7	21	7	35
Combined	44	102	26	172

== All-time results ==
=== Legend ===
Kerry win
Meath win
Match was a draw

=== Senior ===
No.	Date	Winners	Score	Runners-up	Venue	Stage
1.	24 September 1939	Kerry	2-5 - 2-3	Meath	Croke Park	All-Ireland final
2.	10 August 1947	Kerry	1-11 - 0-5	Meath	Croke Park	All-Ireland semi-final
3.	26 September 1954	Meath	1-13 - 1-7	Kerry	Croke Park	All-Ireland final
4.	27 September 1970	Kerry	2-19 - 0-18	Meath	Croke Park	All-Ireland final
5.	24 August 1986	Kerry	2-13 - 0-12	Meath	Croke Park	All-Ireland semi-final
6.	2 September 2001	Meath	2-14 - 0-5	Kerry	Croke Park	All-Ireland semi-final
7.	23 August 2009	Kerry	2-8 - 1-7	Meath	Croke Park	All-Ireland semi-final
8.	3 August 2019	Kerry	2-18 - 1-13	Meath	Páirc Tailteann	All-Ireland quarter-final group stage
9.	14 June 2025	Meath	1-22 - 0-16	Kerry	Glenisk O'Connor Park	All-Ireland Senior Football Championship Round 3
