= Tom Conlon (Gaelic footballer) =

Irish Gaelic footballer (1925–1990)

Personal information
- Native name: Tomás Ó Conalláin (Irish)
- Nickname: Big Tom
- Born: 1925 Stabannon, County Louth, Irish Free State
- Died: 23 January 1990 (aged 64) Drumconrath, County Meath, Ireland
- Occupation: Farmer
- Height: 6 ft 0 in (183 cm)

Sport
- Sport: Gaelic football
- Position: Full-back
Club
- Years: Club
- 1942–1960: Stabannon Parnells
Club titles
- Louth titles: 2
Inter-county
- Years: County
- 1944–1957: Louth
Inter-county titles
- Leinster titles: 3
- All-Irelands: 1
- NFL: 0

Thomas Conlon (1925 – 23 January 1990) was an Irish Gaelic footballer. At club level he played with Stabannon Parnells and was also a member of the Louth senior football team.

== Career ==
Conlon first played Gaelic football as a minor with the O'Connells club in 1941. The following year he played with the Ardee minors and was also a member of the beaten Mid Louth side in the county final. Conlon was still eligible for the minor grade when he won a Louth JFC medal with Stabannon Parnells in 1943 before winning a Cardinal O'Donnell Cup title in 1945. He captained the club their inaugural Louth SFC title in 1949, before claiming a second winners' medal in 1954.

Conlon first appeared on the inter-county scene as a substitute with the Louth minor team in 1942. He was just 19-years-old when he made his senior team debut against Meath in 1944. Conlon made his championship debut as captain during Louth's Leinster SFC-winning season in 1950, however, they lost the subsequent All-Ireland final to Mayo. He claimed a second Leinster medal in 1953 before retiring from inter-county activity. Conlon was coaxed back to the Louth team and won a third Leinster medal in 1957. He was at full-back when Louth beat Cork in the 1957 All-Ireland final.

== Personal life and death ==
Conlon spent his entire working life as a farmer in Stabannon. He died after a period of illness on 23 January 1990, aged 64.

== Honours ==
Stabannon Parnells

- Louth Senior Football Championship: 1949 (c), 1954

Louth

- All-Ireland Senior Football Championship: 1957
- Leinster Senior Football Championship: 1950 (c), 1953, 1957

Leinster

- Railway Cup: 1952, 1953, 1954

Sporting positions
| Preceded by Seán Boyle | Louth Senior Football Captain; 1950 | Succeeded by Stephen White |
| Preceded by Jack Regan | Louth Senior Football Captain; 1955 | Succeeded by Paddy McArdle |
