= 1939 All-Ireland Senior Football Championship =

Football championship

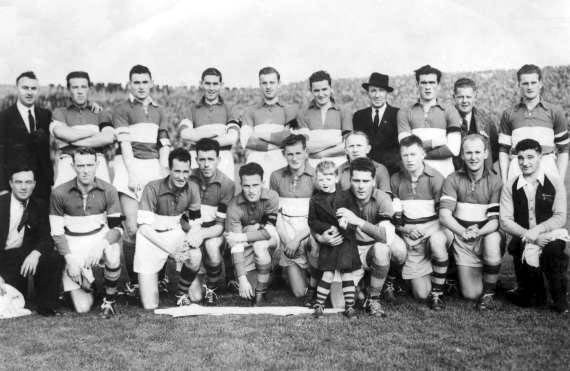

Championship details
- Teams: 26

All-Ireland Champions
- Winning team: Kerry (13th win)
- Captain: Tom O'Connor

All-Ireland Finalists
- Losing team: Meath
- Captain: Matt Gilsenan

Provincial Champions
- Munster: Kerry
- Leinster: Meath
- Ulster: Cavan
- Connacht: Mayo

Championship statistics

The 1939 All-Ireland Senior Football Championship was the 53rd staging of Ireland's premier Gaelic football knock-out competition. Galway entered the championship as defending champions; however, they were beaten by Mayo in the Connacht final. Kerry were the winners.

== Format ==
=== Provincial Championships format changes ===
==== Leinster Championship format change ====
2 Preliminary rounds instead of usual 1. Involved were Longford, Carlow, Westmeath & Wicklow of course the winners qualified for a quarterfinal to meet the stronger teams.

==== Munster Championship format change ====
In 1939 Kerry were given a bye to the Munster final, preliminary round was just a lone match between Cork vs Waterford, the winners of the game played in the quarterfinals along with Tipperary, Limerick and Clare, the winners of the game played in a lone Semifinal. The format was previously used in 1933 and was used again in 1941.

=== All Ireland semifinals system ===
The All-Ireland Senior Football Championship was run on a provincial basis as usual in every 3rd year in rotation, with the four winners from Connacht, Leinster, Munster and Ulster advancing to the All-Ireland semi-finals. The draw for these games was as follows:

- Munster V. Connacht
- Ulster V. Leinster

== Provincial championships ==
=== Connacht Senior Football Championship ===
Semifinal		Final
		Galway	0–03
Mayo	2–10	Mayo	2–06
Sligo	0–02

25 June 1939
Semifinal

Mayo	2–10 – 0–2	Sligo
H Kenny (0–1), M Hannon (0–1), J Munnelly (1–3), P Moclair (1–1), T Hoban (0–4).

Sligo
Attendance: 4,000

16 July 1939
Final

Mayo	2–6 – 0–3	Galway
P Flannelly (0–3), M Hannon (0–1); J Munnelly (0–1), P Moclair (2–1).

St. Coman's Park, Roscommon
Attendance: 20,000

=== Leinster Senior Football Championship ===
Round 1
Longford	0–17
4-04	Westmeath
Carlow	2–08
Wicklow	1–03

Round 2
3–04
Carlow	2–05

Quarterfinals
Wexford	0–06
Longford	0–04
Louth	3–04
Dublin	1–06
Meath	1–09
Laois	1–07
Kildare	2–11
Offaly	1–01

Semifinals
Wexford	1–07
Louth	0–07
Meath	2–10
Kildare	2–08

Final
Wexford	2–03
Meath	2–07

7 May 1939
Round 1

Longford	0–17 – 4–4	Westmeath

Pearse Park, Longford

14 May 1939
Round 1

Wicklow	1–3 – 2–8	Carlow

Enniscorthy

28 May 1939
Round 2

Longford	3–4 – 2–5	Carlow

O'Moore Park, Portlaoise

28 May 1939
Quarterfinal

Louth	3–4 – 1–6	Dublin

Páirc Tailteann, Navan

4 June 1939
Quarterfinal

Meath	1–9 – 1–7	Laois

Cusack Park, Mullingar

11 June 1939
Quarterfinal

Kildare	2–11 – 1–1	Offaly
M.Geraghty 1–5, T.Dalton 1–1, P.Barry 0–2, M.Brosnan, P.Waters, H.Ennis 0–1.

Nolan Park, Kilkenny
Referee: D Hamilton (Dublin)

11 June 1939
Quarterfinal

Wexford	0–6 – 0–4	Longford

Croke Park, Dublin

2 July 1939
Semifinal

Wexford	1–7 – 0–7	Louth

Croke Park, Dublin

9 July 1939
Semifinal

Meath	2–10 – 2–8	Kildare
		W.Ryan 1–1, M.Geraghty 0–3, P.Barry 1–0, P.Waters, R.Martin, M.Brosnan, T.Dalton 0–1.

Drogheda Park, Drogheda
Attendance: 20,000

30 July 1939
Final

Meath	2–7 – 2–3	Wexford
Tony Donnelly 0–5 (0-3f), Jim Clarke and Hugh Lynch 1–0 each, Matty Gilsenan and Jack Cummins 0–1 each		Tom Roche 1–2 and Joe Smyth 1–1

Croke Park, Dublin
Attendance: 20,000
Referee: J. Dunne (Dublin)

=== Munster Senior Football Championship ===
Preliminary round
Cork	0–08
Waterford	0–07

Quarterfinals
Clare	1–08, 2–14
Limerick	2–05, 0–03
Tipperary	1–09
Cork	2–02

Semifinal
Clare	1–06
Tipperary	4–05

Final
Kerry	2–11
Tipperary	0–04

14 May 1939
Preliminary round

Cork	0–8 – 0–7	Waterford
D. O’Connor & P. Barron (0–1), R. Harnedy (1–1), P.O’Sullivan (0–1), J. Young & R. Keily (0–2).

Fraher Field, Dungarvan

14 May 1939
Quarterfinal

Clare	1–8 – 2–5	Limerick

Cusack Park, Ennis

4 June 1939
Quarterfinal

Tipperary	1–9 – 2–2	Cork
		D. Murphy & P. O’Sullivan (0–1).

Mitchelstown
Referee: S. Moynihan (K)

18 June 1939
Quarterfinal Replay

Clare	2–14 – 0–3	Limerick

The Cricket Field, Kilrush
Attendance: 2,000

2 July 1939
Semifinal

Tipperary	4–5 – 1–6	Clare

Gaelic Grounds, Limerick
Referee: S. Moynihan (K)

23 July 1939
Final

Kerry	2–11 – 0–4	Tipperary
Johnny Walsh (0–1), Tony McAuliffe (1–1), Charlie O'Sullivan (0–1), Mikey Lyne (0–3) & Murt Kelly (1–4).

Ned Hall Park, Clonmel
Referee: D. Goode (W)

=== Ulster Senior Football Championship ===
Preliminary round
Down	1–06
Antrim	1–05

Quarterfinals
Donegal	0–06
Down	1–01
Cavan	4–11
Tyrone	1–02

Semifinals
Armagh	1–06, 1–06
Monaghan	1–06, 0–02
Donegal	0–04
Cavan	5–12

Final
Armagh	2–04, 1–04
Cavan	2–06, 2–03

25 June 1939
Preliminary round

Down	1–6 – 1–5	Antrim

Corrigan Park, Belfast

25 June 1939
Quarterfinal

Cavan	4–11 – 1–2	Tyrone

Omagh
Attendance: 3,000

2 July 1939
Quarterfinal

Donegal	0–6 – 1–1	Down

Magheragallon

16 July 1939
Semifinal

Monaghan	1–6 – 1–6	Armagh

St. Mary's Park, Castleblayney

23 July 1939
Semifinal Replay

Monaghan	0–2 – 1–6	Armagh

St. Mary's Park, Castleblayney

23 July 1939
Semifinal

Cavan	5–12 – 0–4	Donegal

Breffni Park, Cavan
Attendance: 8,000

6 August 1939
Final

Cavan	2–6 – 2–4	Armagh

St. Mary's Park, Castleblayney

13 August 1939
Final Replay

Cavan	2–3 – 1–4	Armagh

Croke Park, Dublin

== All-Ireland Senior Football Championship ==
Semifinals
1M	Kerry	0–04, 3–08
1C	Mayo	0–04, 1–04
1L	Meath	1–09
1U	Cavan	1–01

Final
1M	Kerry	2–05
1L	Meath	2–03

13 August 1939
Semifinal

Kerry	0–4 – 0–4	Mayo
Sean Brosnan (0–2), Charlie O'Sullivan (0–1) & Murt Kelly (0–1).		P Flannelly (0–1), J Carney (0–1) & T Hoban (0–2, one free).

Croke Park, Dublin

20 August 1939
Semifinal

Meath	1–9 – 1–1	Cavan

Croke Park, Dublin

10 September 1939
Semifinal Replay

Kerry	3–8 – 1–4	Mayo
P. Kennedy(0–1), J. G. O'Gorman (0–2), S. Brosnan (0–1), J. Walsh (1–1), T. Landers (0–2), D. Spring (1–0) & C. O'Sullivan (1–1).		H Kenny (0–1), P Laffey (0–2), J Munnelly (1–0) & T Hoban (0–1).

Croke Park, Dublin

24 September 1939
Final

Kerry	2–5 – 2–3	Meath
Murt Kelly (0–2), Johnny Walsh, Tim Landers(0–1) & Dan Spring (2–1).		M. Glsenan, J. Clarke (1-2), T. Laners (0-1), M. Gilseana & J. Clarke (1-0) & T. Donnelly (0-3).

Croke Park, Dublin
Attendance: 46,828
Referee: J Flaherty (Offaly)

== Championship statistics ==
=== Miscellaneous ===
- Meath win their second Leinster Title first since 1895.
- Kerry are now one behind Dublin with All Ireland titles.
- The Ulster Final was originally scheduled for St. Mary's Park, Castleblaney, however it had to be abandoned when spectators encroached onto the pitch, with Cavan leading by two points. The replay was fixed for Croke Park the following week as a double-header of the All-Ireland semi-final between Kerry and Mayo.
- There were a number of first-time championship meetings; There were 2 first time championship meetings in the All Ireland Series at first in the semifinal stage a first meeting between Meath vs Cavan while the second was All Ireland final was the first championship meeting of Kerry vs Meath.
