= Nigel Crawford =

Irish Gaelic footballer

Personal information
- Native name: Nigel Ō Crábhagáin (Irish)
- Born: 10 October 1979 (age 47) Dunboyne, County Meath
- Height: 6 ft 4 in (193 cm)

Sport
- Position: Midfield
Club
- Years: Club
- 1997-: St Peter's, Dunboyne
Club titles
- Meath titles: 2
- Leinster titles: 0
- All-Ireland Titles: 0
Inter-county
Years	County	Apps (scores)
1998-2011	Meath	<100 (1-40)
Inter-county titles
- Leinster titles: 3
- All-Irelands: 1
- All Stars: 0

Nigel Crawford (born 10 October 1979, in County Meath) is an Irish Gaelic footballer who plays for St Peter's, Dunboyne and the Meath county team. Crawford made his debut for Meath in late 1998 and has been there since. He has won three Leinster medals in 1999, 2001 and in 2010 and has won one All-Ireland medal. Crawford was named as Meath captain for the 2010 Championship, captaining them to their win over Louth in the Leinster Final.

== Honours ==
- All-Ireland Senior Football Championship: 1
  - 1999
- Leinster Senior Football Championship: 3
  - 1999, 2001, 2010
- Meath Senior Football Championship: 2
  - 1998, 2005

Preceded by Brendan Murphy	Meath Senior Football Captain; 2008-2011	Succeeded by Séamus Kenny
