= Christo Hand =

Irish Gaelic footballer

Personal information
- Born: 1924 Ardcath, County Meath, Ireland
- Died: February 2006 (aged 81) Santry, County Dublin, Ireland

Sport
- Sport: Gaelic football
- Position: Left wing-back
Clubs
- Years: Club
- St Vincent's; Seán McDermott's
Club titles
- Meath titles: 1
Inter-county
- Years: County
- 1943–1953: Meath
Inter-county titles
- Leinster titles: 2
- All-Irelands: 1
- NFL: 1

Christopher "Christo" Hand (1924 – February 2006) was an Irish Gaelic footballer who played as a left wing-back at senior level for the Meath county team.

Born in Ardcath, County Meath, Hand first arrived on the inter-county scene at the age of seventeen when he first linked up with the Meath minor team. He made his senior debut during the 1943 championship. Hand went on to play a key role for Meath for a decade, and won one All-Ireland medal, four Leinster medals and one National Football League medal. He was an All-Ireland runner-up on one occasion.

At club level Hand was a one-time championship medallist with Seán McDermott's in Dublin. He also won a championship medal with St Vincent's in Meath.

Hand retired from inter-county football following the conclusion of the 1953 championship.

== Honours ==
=== Team ===
Seán McDermott's

- Dublin Senior Football Championship (1): 1947

St Vincent's

- Meath Senior Football Championship (1): 1955

Meath

- All-Ireland Senior Football Championship (1): 1949
- Leinster Senior Football Championship (4): 1947, 1949, 1951, 1952,
- National Football League (1): 1950–51
