= Jimmy McDonnell =

Irish Gaelic footballer and manager

Personal information
- Native name: Séamus Mac Domhnaill (Irish)
- Born: 1927 Darver, County Louth, Ireland
- Died: 29 September 2017 (aged 90) Knockbridge, County Louth, Ireland

Sport
- Sport: Gaelic football
- Position: Full-forward
Clubs
- Years: Club
- Darver Volunteers; St Joseph's
Club titles
- Louth titles: 0
Inter-county
- Years: County
- 1948–1960: Louth
Inter-county titles
- Leinster titles: 4
- All-Irelands: 1
- NFL: 0

James McDonnell (1927 – 30 September 2017) was an Irish Gaelic football manager, selector and player. His league and championship career with the Louth senior team spanned three decades from 1948 until 1960.

Born in Darver, County Louth, McDonnell first played competitive Gaelic football with the Darver Volunteers club. He won a junior league medal in 1952 before winning a county junior championship medal in 1956. From 1961 onward McDonnell played with the newly-formed St Joseph's club.

McDonnell made his debut with the Louth senior team during the 1948 championship. Over the next ten seasons he enjoyed much success, culminating with the winning of an All-Ireland medal in 1957. He also won four Leinster medals. McDonnell retired from inter-county Gaelic football in 1958 but returned for one final season in 1960.

In retirement from playing McDonnell became involved in team management and coaching. At inter-county level he was a selector with the Louth senior team during the 1960s. McDonnell later managed St. Joseph's to a county intermediate championship title in 1990.

== Honours ==
=== Player ===
Darver Volunteers

- Louth Junior Football Championship (1): 1956

Louth

- All-Ireland Senior Football Championship (1): 1957
- Leinster Senior Football Championship (4): 1948, 1950, 1952, 1957

Leinster

- Railway Cup (3): 1953, 1954, 1955

Ireland

- V Combined Universities (2): 1951, 1953

U.C.D.

- Sigerson Cup (1): 1949/50

=== Manager ===
St Joseph's

- Louth Intermediate Football Championship (1): 1990
