= 1952 All-Ireland Senior Football Championship =

Football championship

Championship details
- Dates: May 4 – October 12, 1952
- Teams: 29

All-Ireland Champions
- Winning team: Cavan (5th win)
- Captain: Mick Higgins

All-Ireland Finalists
- Losing team: Meath
- Captain: Paddy Meegan
- Manager: P. Tully

Provincial Champions
- Munster: Cork
- Leinster: Meath
- Ulster: Cavan
- Connacht: Roscommon

Championship statistics
- No. matches played: 28

The 1952 All-Ireland Senior Football Championship was the 66th staging of Ireland's premier Gaelic football knock-out competition.

Limerick play in their last Munster championship game until 1965.

In the Connacht final Roscommon ended Mayo's 2-year spell as All Ireland champions.

Cavan won their fifth, and so far last, All-Ireland title.

== Results ==
=== Connacht Senior Football Championship ===
Note it was the smallest Connacht championship until 2020. Leitrim were not part of the championship.

22 June 1952
Semi-final

| Mayo | 0–9 – 0–6 | Sligo |
|---|---|---|
| E Mongey (0–1), M Mulderrig (0–1), P Carney (0–4), S Mulderrig (0–2); M Flanagan & T Langan (0–1). |

Fr. O'Hara Park, Charlestown
Attendance: 10,000

29 June 1952
Semi-final

| Roscommon | 1–6 – 1–5 | Galway |

St. Coman's Park, Roscommon

==== Final ====
13 July 1952
Final

| Roscommon | 3–4 – 0–6 | Mayo |
|---|---|---|
| | | E Mongey (0–1), P Carney (0–2, one free), S Mulderrig (0–1), T Langan (0–1) & M Loftus (0–1). |

McHale Park, Castlebar

=== Leinster Senior Football Championship ===
4 May 1952
Preliminary round

| Longford | 3–8 – 0–5 | Kildare |
|---|---|---|
| | | S.Brennan 0–2, P.White, K.Boyle, J.Clarke 0–1 |

Cusack Park, Mullingar

11 May 1952
Preliminary round

| Offaly | 0–8 – 1–1 | Westmeath |

Cusack Park, Mullingar
Referee: P Russell

11 May 1952
Preliminary round

| Carlow | 2–8 – 1–7 | Wicklow |

Geraldine Park, Athy

25 May 1952
Quarter-final

| Meath | 2–7 – 2–5 | Dublin |

Drogheda Park, Drogheda

1 June 1952
Quarter-final

| Louth | 0–9 – 1–2 | Wexford |

Croke Park, Dublin

1 June 1952
Quarter-final

| Carlow | 2–5 – 2–7 | Laois |

Geraldine Park, Athy

8 June 1952
Quarter-final

| Offaly | 0–7 – 0–9 | Longford |

Cusack Park, Mullingar
Referee: P Woods

22 June 1952
Semi-final

| Louth | 3–11 – 0–4 | Carlow |

Croke Park, Dublin
Attendance: 25,000

29 June 1952
Semi-final

| Meath | 1–9 – 0–9 | Longford |

Cusack Park, Mullingar

==== Final ====
13 July 1952

| Meath | 1–06 – 0–08 | Louth |
|---|---|---|
| Brian Smyth 1–0, Paddy Meegan 0–3 (2f), Jim Reilly, Paddy Connell, Peter McDermott 0–1 each | | Paddy Beahan, Nicky Roe (2f) 0–3 each, Stephen White, Mickey Reynolds 0–1 each |

Croke Park, Dublin
Attendance: 44,365
Referee: Bill Delaney (Laois)

| GK | 1 | Owen O'Sullivan (Donaghmore) |
| RCB | 2 | Micheál O'Brien (Skryne) |
| FB | 3 | Paddy O'Brien (Seán McDermotts, Dublin) |
| LCB | 4 | Kevin McConnell (Syddan) |
| RHB | 5 | Patsy McGearty (Ballivor) |
| CHB | 6 | Connie Kelly (Oldcastle) |
| LHB | 7 | Christo Hand (Seán McDermotts, Dublin) |
| MF | 8 | Brendan Maguire (Oldcastle) |
| MF | 9 | Mattie McDonnell (Ballinlough) |
| RHF | 10 | Pat Carolan (North Meath) |
| CHF | 11 | Brian Smyth (Skryne) |
| LHF | 12 | Paddy Meegan (Syddan) (c) |
| RCF | 13 | Jim Reilly (Dunboyne) |
| FF | 14 | Paddy Connell (Moynalty) |
| LCF | 15 | Peter McDermott (Navan O'Mahonys) |
Substitutes:
| | 16 | Paddy Dixon (Ballivor) for M. O'Brien |
| | 17 | Des Taaffe (St Dympna's, Dublin) for Carolan |

| GK | 1 | Niall O'Neill (Dundalk Gaels) |
| RCB | 2 | Jim McArdle (Dundalk Young Irelands) |
| FB | 3 | Tom Conlon (Stabannon Parnells) |
| LCB | 4 | Jim Tuft (Dundalk Young Irelands) |
| RHB | 5 | Michael McDonnell (Darver Volunteers) |
| CHB | 6 | Paddy Markey (St Mary's) (c) |
| LHB | 7 | Paddy McArdle (St Mary's) |
| MF | 8 | Hubert Reynolds (Dundalk Gaels) |
| MF | 9 | Jack Regan (Dundalk Gaels) |
| RHF | 10 | Peadar Smith (Oliver Plunketts) |
| CHF | 11 | Paddy Beahan (St Mary's) |
| LHF | 12 | Stephen White (Dundalk Young Irelands) |
| RCF | 13 | Nicky Roe (St Mary's) |
| FF | 14 | Jimmy McDonnell (Darver Volunteers) |
| LCF | 15 | Mickey Reynolds (Stabannon Parnells) |
Substitutes:

=== Munster Senior Football Championship ===
18 May 1952
Quarter-final

| Waterford | 1–3 – 0–5 | Clare |

Cusack Park, Ennis

25 May 1952
Quarter-final

| Tipperary | 0–9 – 1–4 | Limerick |

FitzGerald Park, Kilmallock
Referee: A. Scannell ( C )

6 July 1952
Semi-final

| Cork | 1–7 – 0–5 | Tipperary |
|---|---|---|
| D. Kellaher (0–1), E. Young (0–1), T. Moriaty (0–2), M. Cahill (0–1), C. McGrath (0–1) & J. Cronin (1–1). |

Ned Hall Park, Clonmel
Referee: P. J. Ryan (L)

6 July 1952
Semi-final

| Kerry | 0–14 – 1–7 | Waterford |
|---|---|---|
| P. Sheehy (0–4), T. Lyne (0–3), J. Brosnan (0–2) & S. Kelly (0–5). |

Austin Stack Park, Tralee

==== Final ====
20 July 1952
Final

| Cork | 0–11 – 0–2 | Kerry |
|---|---|---|
| D. O’Donovan (0–2), E. Young (0–1), J. Cronin (0–3), J. J. Henchion (0–1) & C. McGrath (0–4). | | J. Brosnan (0–1) & sub B. Galvin (0–1). |

Cork Athletic Grounds, Cork

=== Ulster Senior Football Championship ===
15 June 1952
Quarter-final

| Cavan | 2–10 – 1–3 | Down |

St. Patrick's Park, Newcastle

15 June 1952
Quarter-final

| Armagh | 1–8 – 1–6 | Tyrone |

O'Neill Park, Dungannon

22 June 1952
Quarter-final

| Monaghan | 2–12 – 0–12 | Derry |

St. Tiernach's Park, Clones

29 June 1952
Quarter-final

| Antrim | 1–7 – 2–3 | Donegal |

Corrigan Park, Belfast
Attendance: 5,000

6 July 1952
Semi-final

| Monaghan | 1–8 – 1–5 | Armagh |

O'Neill Park, Dungannon
Attendance: 8,000

13 July 1952
Semi-final

| Cavan | 3–6 – 2–6 | Antrim |

St. Tiernach's Park, Clones

==== Final ====
27 July 1952
Final

| Cavan | 1–8 – 0–8 | Monaghan |

Breffni Park, Cavan
Attendance: 30,000

=== All-Ireland Senior Football Championship ===
3 August 1952
Semi-final

| Meath | 1–6 – 0–7 | Roscommon |

Croke Park, Dublin
Attendance: 41,231

17 August 1952
Semi-final

| Cavan | 0–10 – 0–3 | Cork |
|---|---|---|
| | | N. Duggan (0–1), D. Kellaher (0–1) & T. Moriaty (2–1). |

Croke Park, Dublin

==== Finals ====
28 September 1952
Final

| Cavan | 2–4 – 1–7 | Meath |
|---|---|---|
| T. Tighe & J. J. Cassidy (1–0), M. Higgins, V. Sherlock, P. Fitsmons & E. Carolan (0–1). | | P. Meegan (0–4), P. McDermott 1–1, J. Reilly & McDonell (0–1). |

Croke Park, Dublin
Attendance: 64,200
Referee: Sean Hayes (Tipperary)

12 October 1952
Final replay

| Cavan | 0–9 – 0–5 | Meath |
|---|---|---|
| M. Higgins (0–7), T. Tighe & J. Cusack (0–1). | | P. McDermott (0–2), J. Reilly, M. McDonnell & D. Taaffe (0–1). |

Croke Park, Dublin
Attendance: 62,515
Referee: Sean Hayes (Tipperary)

== Championship statistics ==
=== Miscellaneous ===
- Fr. O'Hara Park, Charlestown opens in honour of Father Eddie O'Hara.
- Limerick are dropped from the Munster football championship until 1965.
- Smallest Connacht championship until 2020.
- The All Ireland semi-final between Meath and Roscommon was the first meeting between the teams.
- The All-Ireland final ends in a draw and goes to a replay for the first time since 1946.
