= Paddy Dixon =

Irish Gaelic footballer

Personal information
- Native name: Pádraig Mac Riocaird (Irish)
- Born: 1923 Ballivor, County Meath, Ireland
- Died: 20 August 2007 (aged 84) Trim, County Meath, Ireland

Sport
- Sport: Gaelic football
- Position: Centre-back
Club
- Years: Club
- Ballivor
Club titles
- Meath titles: 0
Inter-county
- Years: County
- 1949–1952: Meath
Inter-county titles
- Leinster titles: 1
- All-Irelands: 1
- NFL: 1

Paddy Dixon (1923 – 20 August 2007) was an Irish Gaelic footballer who played as a centre-back at senior level for the Meath county team.

Dixon became a regular member of the Meath senior team during the 1949 championship. He went on to play a key role during a golden age for Meath, and won one All-Ireland medal, one Leinster medal and one National League medals. He was an All-Ireland runner-up on one occasion.

== Honours ==
Meath

- All-Ireland Senior Football Championship (1): 1949
- Leinster Senior Football Championship (1): 1949
- National Football League (1): 1950–51
