= Brian Smyth (Gaelic footballer) =

Irish Gaelic footballer and hurler

Personal information
- Native name: Brian Mac Gabhann (Irish)
- Born: 24 March 1924 Batterstown, County Meath, Ireland
- Died: 16 March 2016 (aged 91) Blanchardstown, County Dublin, Ireland
- Occupation: CIÉ employee

Sport
- Sport: Gaelic football
- Position: Centre-forward
Club
- Years: Club
- Skryne
Club titles
- Meath titles: 5
Inter-county
- Years: County
- 1946–1956: Meath
Inter-county titles
- Leinster titles: 4
- All-Irelands: 2
- NFL: 1

Brian Smyth (24 March 1924 – 16 March 2016) was an Irish Gaelic footballer and hurler who played as a centre-forward at senior level for the Meath county football team.

Born in Batterstown, County Meath, Smyth had his first involvement with Gaelic football and hurling against Boy Scouts from Dublin, who used to come to the local area on weekend camps. He fielded with local club Batterstown in both codes but when the club was unable to muster enough players, he lined out with Flathouse with whom he won a junior championship medal in hurling. He also played both codes with Ratoath before lining out with Oberstown in hurling and Skryne in Gaelic football, helping the latter to five championship victories. He finished his hurling career with Dunboyne.

Smyth made his debut on the inter-county scene when he first linked up with the Meath junior hurling team in 1944. An All-Ireland medal winner in this code, he joined the Meath senior football team for the 1946 championship. Smyth went on to play a key role during a hugely successful era, and won two All-Ireland medals, four Leinster medals and one National League medal. The All-Ireland-winning captain of 1949, Smyth was also an All-Ireland runner-up on two occasions.

Smyth was a member of the Leinster inter-provincial team on a number of occasions, however, he never won a Railway Cup medal. He retired from inter-county football following the conclusion of the 1957 championship.

In retirement from playing, Smyth became involved in team management and administration. His involvement as a trainer was short-lived, however, he guided Drumree to championship success in the junior grade in 1959. Smyth became involved in administrative affairs as a teenager when he took over as secretary of the Batterstown club. He was secretary of the Meath Hurling Board on two occasions, before serving as chairman of the Meath County Board between 1979 and 1985.

== Honours ==
Skryne

- Meath Senior Football Championship (5): 1944, 1945, 1947, 1948, 1954

Meath

- All-Ireland Senior Football Championship (2): 1949 (c), 1954
- Leinster Senior Football Championship (4): 1949 (c), 1951, 1952, 1954
- National Football League (1): 1950-51
