= Séamus Kenny =

Irish Gaelic footballer

Personal information
- Native name: Séamas Ó Cionnaith (Irish)
- Born: 4 January 1980 (age 46) Navan, County Meath

Sport
- Sport: Gaelic football
- Position: Right half back
Club
- Years: Club
- Simonstown Gaels
Inter-county
- Years: County
- 2001-2014: Meath
Inter-county titles
- Leinster titles: 2
- All-Irelands: 0

Séamus Kenny (born 4 January 1980) is a Gaelic footballer who plays for the Simonstown Gaels club and, formerly, at senior level for the Meath county team for thirteen years from 2001 until 2014.

Kenny made his debut for Meath in 2001 as a blood sub in the Leinster quarter-final victory over Westmeath and was named Meath football captain for 2011 and retained that honour for 2012. Kenny's 2012 Championship was cut short when he suffered cruciate ligament damage in his knee after only seven minutes of Meath's first-round victory over Wicklow in the Leinster championship. Kenny retired from inter-county football on 7 August 2014 having missed the majority of the 2013 and 2014 seasons owing to injury.

Preceded by Nigel Crawford	Meath Senior Football Captain; 2011–2013	Succeeded by Kevin Reilly
