= Séamus Heery =

Irish Gaelic footballer

Personal information
- Native name: Séamus Ó hÍorua (Irish)
- Nickname: Séamie
- Born: 1927 Rathkenny, County Meath, Ireland
- Died: 5 November 2014 (aged 87) Collon, County Meath, Ireland

Sport
- Sport: Gaelic football
- Position: Right wing-back
Clubs
- Years: Club
- Rathkenny; North Meath
Club titles
- Meath titles: 1
Inter-county
- Years: County
- 1949-1951: Meath
Inter-county titles
- Leinster titles: 2
- All-Irelands: 1
- NFL: 0

Séamus "Séamie" Heery (1927 – 5 November 2014) was an Irish Gaelic footballer who played as a right wing-back at senior level for the Meath county team.

Born in Rathkenny, County Meath, Heery first arrived on the inter-county scene at the age of twenty-two when he first linked up with the Meath senior team, making his debut during the 1949 championship. Heery went on to play a key role for Meath, and won one All-Ireland medal and two Leinster medals. He was an All-Ireland runner-up on one occasion.

At club level Heery was a one-time championship medallist with divisional side North Meath. He also played with club side Rathkenny.

His nephew, Mick O'Dowd, was also an All-Ireland medallist with Meath.

Heery retired from inter-county football following the conclusion of the 1951 championship.

== Honours ==
=== Team ===
North Meath

- Meath Senior Football Championship (1): 1950

Meath

- All-Ireland Senior Football Championship (1): 1949
- Leinster Senior Football Championship (5): 1949, 1951 (c)

Sporting positions
Preceded by	Meath Senior Football Captain; 1951	Succeeded by
