= St Jarlath's Park =

Stadium in Tuam, Ireland

- Páirc Naomh Iarlaith
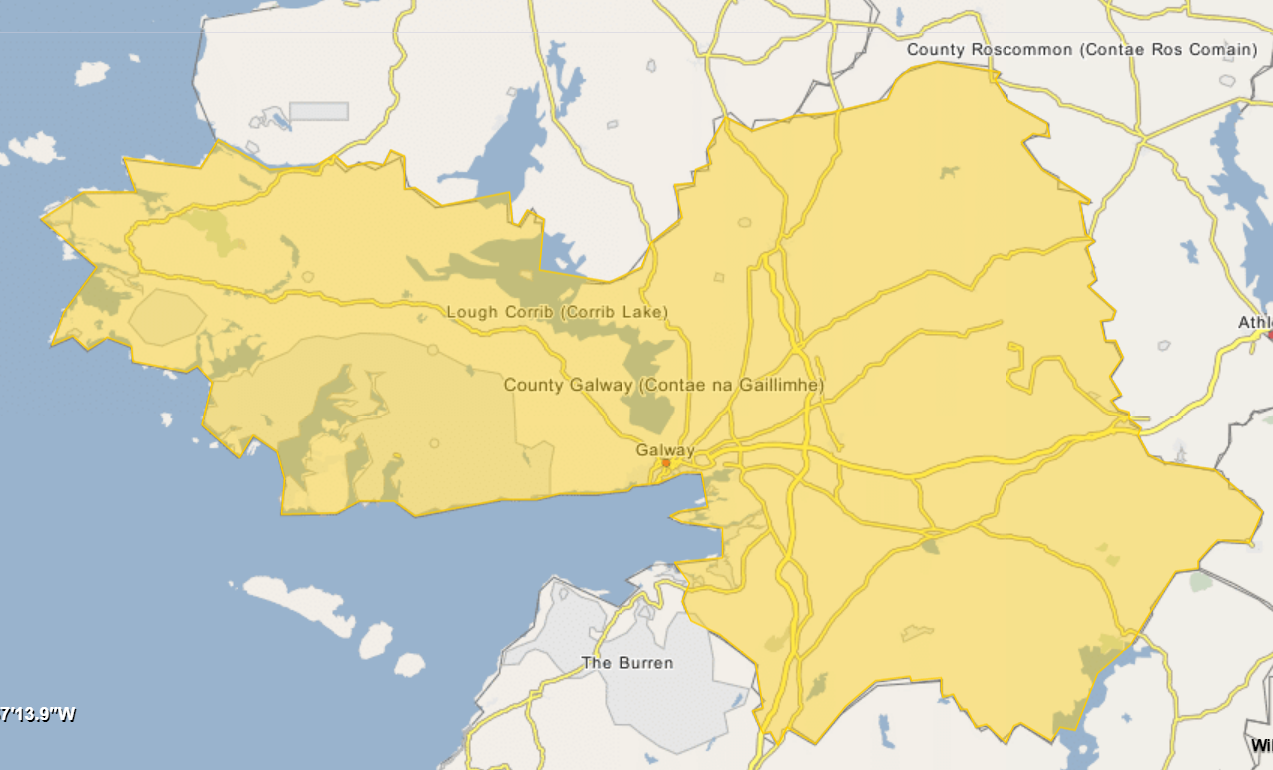
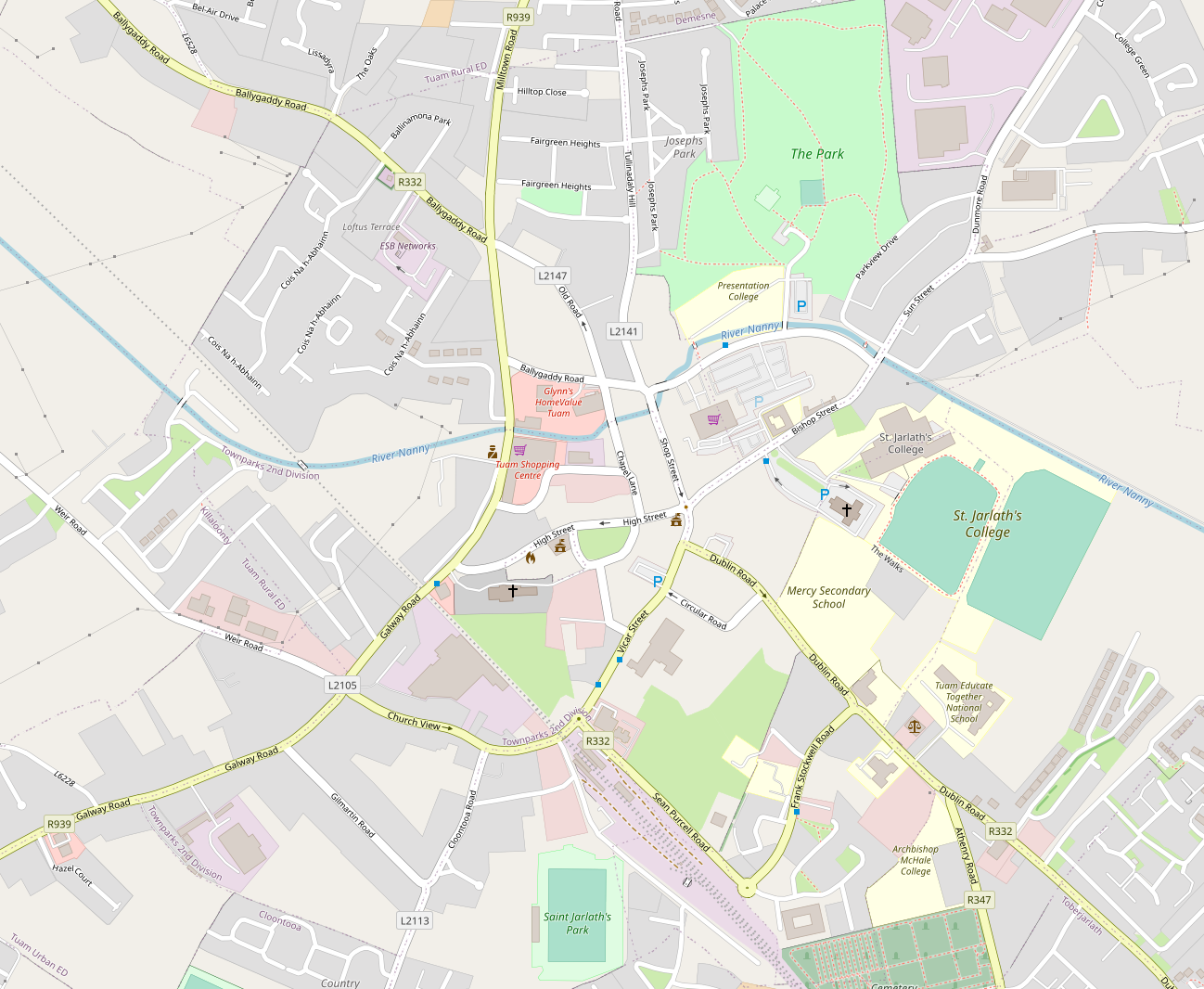
- Location within Ireland Location within County Galway Location within Tuam
- Location: Tuam, County Galway, Ireland
- Coordinates: 53°30′34″N 8°51′13″W
- Owner: Galway GAA
- Capacity: 6,700
- Public transit: Gilmartin Road

Construction
- Opened: 1950

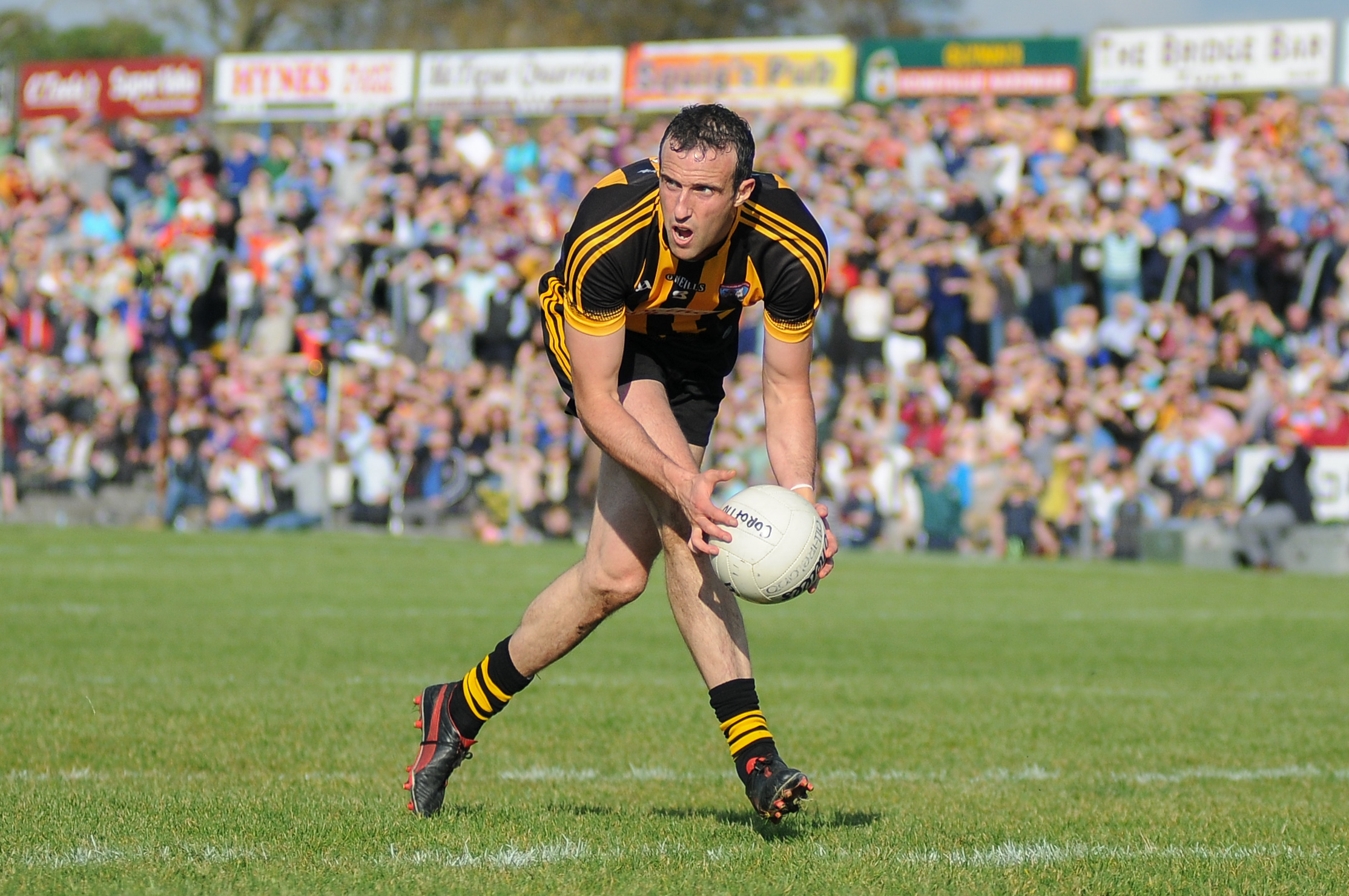
Joe Bergin playing at Tuam Stadium, 2015

St Jarlath's Park (/ˈdʒɑːrləθs/; Páirc Iarflaith Naofa, commonly known as Tuam Stadium) is a GAA stadium in Tuam, County Galway, Ireland. It is one of the principal stadiums of Galway GAA's football teams. The ground once had a capacity of around 26,000. This has progressively been reduced for safety reasons and has most recently been reduced to 6,700.

The official opening of the stadium took place on 21 May 1950. It was blessed and officially opened by the Archbishop of Tuam, Rev. Dr Walsh. The stadium is named for Iarlaithe mac Loga (Jarlath), a 6th-century saint who was the first Bishop of Tuam. The stadium opened with two games, one between Cavan and Mayo and the other between Galway and Dublin.

== See also ==
- List of Gaelic Athletic Association stadiums
- List of stadiums in Ireland by capacity
