= Paddy Meegan =

Irish Gaelic footballer

Personal information
- Native name: Pádraig Ó Miagáin (Irish)
- Born: 1922 Syddan, County Meath, Ireland
- Died: 14 November 2012 (aged 90) Drogheda, County Louth, Ireland
- Occupation: Farmer

Sport
- Sport: Gaelic football
- Position: Right corner-forward
Club
- Years: Club
- Syddan
Club titles
- Meath titles: 3
Inter-county*
Years	County	Apps (scores)
1942-1954	Meath	50
Inter-county titles
- Leinster titles: 5
- All-Irelands: 2
- NFL: 2
- *Inter County team apps and scores correct as of 14:04, 17 November 2012.

Patrick Meegan (1922 – 14 November 2012) was an Irish Gaelic footballer who played as a right corner-forward at senior level for the Meath county team.

Meegan made his first appearance for the team during the 1942 championship and was a regular member of the starting fifteen until his retirement after the 1954 championship. During that time he won two All-Ireland medals, five Leinster medals and two National Football League medals. Meegan was an All-Ireland runner-up on two occasions.

At club level Meegan was a three-time county championship medalist with Syddan.

== Honours ==
=== Team ===
Syddan

- Meath Senior Football Championship (3): 1951, 1952, 1956
- Meath Intermediate Football Championship (1): 1941

Meath

- All-Ireland Senior Football Championship (2): 1949, 1954
- Leinster Senior Football Championship (5): 1947, 1949, 1951, 1952 (c), 1954
- National Football League (2): 1945–46, 1950–51

Leinster

- Railway Cup (4): 1945, 1952 (c), 1953 (c), 1954

Sporting positions
Preceded by Séamus Heery	Meath Senior Football Captain; 1952	Succeeded by
Achievements
Preceded by Seán Flanagan (Connacht)	Railway Cup Football Final winning captain 1952-1953	Succeeded by Stephen White (Leinster)
