= 1945–46 National Football League (Ireland) =

Gaelic football competition

League details
- Dates: November 1945 – April 1946

League champions
- Winners: Meath (2nd win)
- Captain: Matt O'Toole

League runners-up
- Runners-up: Wexford

The 1945–46 National Football League was the 15th staging of the National Football League, an annual Gaelic football tournament for the Gaelic Athletic Association county teams of Ireland.

The NFL returned after the four-year gap due to The Emergency / Second World War. Meath won, beating Wexford in the final.

== Format ==
There were four divisions – Northern, Southern, Eastern and Western. Division winners played off for the NFL title.

== League-phase results and tables ==
=== Group one (Dr Lagan Cup) ===
Down, Tyrone, Armagh, Derry, Antrim

=== Group two ===
==== Table ====
Team	Pld	W	D	L	Pts	Status
Meath	4	4	0	0	8	Qualified for knockout phase
Louth	4	2	0	2	4
Monaghan	4	2	0	2	4
Longford	4	2	0	2	4
Fermanagh	4	0	0	4	0

=== Group three ===
Wexford won, from Waterford, Carlow and Cork

=== Group four ===
Cavan won, from Leitrim, Sligo, Mayo, Roscommon

=== Group five ===
==== Results ====
4 November 1945 Round 1	Tipperary	1-7 — 2-1	Kerry	Clonmel

4 November 1945 Round 1	Galway	2-11 — 3-4	Clare	Galway

18 November 1945 Round 2	Kerry	0-12 — 1-8	Galway	Austin Stack Park, Tralee

18 November 1945 Round 2	Clare	0-5 — 3-7	Tipperary	Milltown Malbay

3 March 1946 Round 3	Tipperary	3-5 — 2-5	Galway	Clonmel

10 March 1946 Round 3	Clare	scr — scr	Kerry

==== Table ====
Team	Pld	W	D	L	Pts	Status
Tipperary	3	3	0	0	6	Qualified for knockout phase
Galway	3	1	0	2	2
Kerry	2	1	0	1	2
Clare	2	0	0	2	0

=== Group Six ===
Dublin won, from Kildare, Laois, Wicklow, Offaly

== Knockout phase ==
=== Inter-group play-offs ===
7 April 1946

Wexford	1-8 – 1-7	Tipperary

Wexford Park, Wexford

31 March 1946

Meath	3-9 – 2-5	Cavan

Breffni Park, Cavan

=== Semi-final ===
14 April 1946

Meath	3-4 – 1-10	Antrim

Navan

28 April 1946
Replay

Meath	0-11 – 0-9	Antrim

Corrigan Park, Belfast

14 April 1946

Wexford	5-6 – 1-2	Dublin

Enniscorthy

=== Final ===
26 May 1946

Meath	2-2 – 0-6	Wexford
Bill Halpenny 1-0, Jim Clarke 1-0, Frankie O'Neill 0-1, Paddy Meegan 0-1		Des O'Neill 0-2, Paddy Kehoe 0-2, Nicky Rackard 0-1, Tom O'Leary 0-1

Croke Park, Dublin
Attendance: 18,215
Referee: J Dowling (Kildare)
