= 1950–51 National Football League (Ireland) =

Gaelic football competition

League details
- Dates: October 1950 – 30 September 1951

League champions
- Winners: Meath (3rd win)
- Captain: Paddy Meegan

League runners-up
- Runners-up: New York
- Captain: Tom "Gega" O'Connor

The 1950–51 National Football League was the 20th staging of the National Football League, an annual Gaelic football tournament for the Gaelic Athletic Association county teams of Ireland.

Thirty counties participated; Kilkenny and Limerick did not participate.

Meath won the home final and flew to New York for the real final. Despite some players being weakened by smallpox vaccination, they beat New York by a goal and sailed home in triumph on the SS Nieuw Amsterdam. John 'Lefty' Devine commentated on the radio, and was criticised for his newly acquired New York accent (he was a native of County Clare).

== Format ==
Teams are placed into Divisions I, II, III and IV. The top team in each division reaches the home semi-finals. The winner of the home final plays New York in the NFL final.

== Group stage ==
=== Division I (Dr Lagan Cup) ===
==== Eastern Section ====
Team	Pld	W	D	L	Pts	Status
Monaghan	3	3	0	0	6	Win Dr Lagan Cup; advance to Knockout Stage
Antrim	3	2	0	1	4
Armagh	3	1	0	2	2
Down	3	0	0	3	0

==== Western Section ====
Team	Pld	W	D	L	Pts	Status
Donegal	3	3	0	0	6
Derry	3	2	0	1	4
Tyrone	3	1	0	2	2
Fermanagh	3	0	0	3	0

=== Division II ===
Tipperary, Carlow, Cork, Wexford, Waterford

=== Division III ===
Mayo won, ahead of Galway, Clare, Laois and Kerry.

=== Division IV ===
Meath,Wicklow, Westmeath,Kildare, Louth and Dublin.

=== Division V ===
Roscommon,Longford, Sligo,Leitrim, Offaly and Cavan.

== Knockout stage ==
=== Quarter-finals ===
1 April 1951

Meath	2-8 – 1-4	Monaghan

Croke Park, Dublin
Attendance: 11,741
Referee: J Shanley, Dublin

=== Semi-finals ===
8 April 1951

Cork	0-2 – 1-6	Mayo

Croke Park, Dublin

15 April 1951

Meath	2-5 – 2-3	Cavan

Croke Park, Dublin
Referee: J Shanley, Dublin

=== Finals ===
29 April 1951
Home Final

Meath	0-6 – 0-3	Mayo
Paddy Meegan 0-2, Mattie McDonnell 0-2, Brian Smyth 0-1, Peter McDermott 0-1		P Solan 0-2; S Mulderrig 0-1

Croke Park, Dublin
Attendance: 46,197
Referee: Simon Deignan (Cavan)

30 September 1951
Final

Meath	1-10 – 0-10	New York
Mattie McDonnell 1-0		Tom O'Connor 0-6

Polo Grounds, New York City
Attendance: 30,000
Referee: John Dunne (Galway)
