= Patrick Tully =

Irish Gaelic footballer and coach

Father Patrick Tully (Fr. Packie Tully) was a well-known figure in Meath GAA circles, particularly for his training of Meath Gaelic football teams of 1949, 1954 and 1967 to All Ireland Senior titles. Prior to the 1949 win Meath had never won a Senior All Ireland Title. Fr Tully was educated at Kentstown National School, St Finian's College, Mullingar and St. Patrick's College, Maynooth, where he was ordained a priest in 1942 and subsequently served in a number of parishes in the Meath dioceses when in 1948 he was posted to Moynalty. While based here he was elected County Board Chairman in 1949, a post he held for 20 years and combined this with training the Meath Senior football team.

As a player, he played with Navan De La Salles and Seneschalstown GAA Clubs in Meath. He was one of the organisers of the 1968 Meath footballers' tour of Australia, which would lead to the International Rules Series matches between Gaelic footballers and Australian rules footballers.
