= 1951 All-Ireland Senior Football Championship =

Football championship

Championship details
- Dates: May 13 – September 23, 1951
- Teams: 29

All-Ireland Champions
- Winning team: Mayo (3rd win)
- Captain: Sean Flanagan

All-Ireland Finalists
- Losing team: Meath
- Captain: Séamus Heery
- Manager: P. Tully

Provincial Champions
- Munster: Kerry
- Leinster: Meath
- Ulster: Antrim
- Connacht: Mayo

Championship statistics
- No. matches played: 37

The 1951 All-Ireland Senior Football Championship was the 65th staging of Ireland's premier Gaelic football knock-out competition.

Mayo won their second All-Ireland in a row.

Limerick rejoined the Munster championship after a 2 year lapse break.

== The Curse of '51 ==
Mayo failed to win an All-Ireland football final between 1951 and 2026. Legend has it that a priest became furious when the Mayo team bus returning home from the 1951 final passed by a funeral without showing respect as they celebrated their All-Ireland win. The priest supposedly put a curse on Mayo, that they would not win another title until all of the team had died. All remaining members of the team had died by 2023. Paddy Prendergast, who was the final surviving member and played at full-back, died at the age of 95 on 26 September 2021. Mick Loftus, who was a sub and did not play on the day, died at the age of 93 on 22 April 2023.

On 26 July 2026, Mayo defeated Kerry by 1–20 (23) to 1–17 (20) in an All-Ireland final, ending a 75-year wait to win back the Sam Maguire Cup.

== Results ==
=== Connacht Senior Football Championship ===
24 June 1951
Semi-Final

Mayo	3–7 – 1–5	Sligo
M Flanagan (0–2), S Mulderrig (2–2, one goal a penalty), M Mulderrig (0–2) & T Langan (1–1).

Corran Park, Ballymote
Attendance: 7,000

1 July 1951
Semi-Final

Galway	2–10 – 1–4	Roscommon

Tuam Stadium, Tuam

15 July 1951
Final

Mayo	4–13 – 2–3	Galway
H Dixon (0–1), E Mongey (0–1), P Carney (0–3), S Mulderrig (0–3); M Mulderrig (0–1), T Langan (1–3) & P Solan (3–1).

Tuam Stadium, Tuam
Attendance: 27,000

=== Leinster Senior Football Championship ===
13 May 1951
Preliminary Round

Kildare	2–9 – 1–3	Wicklow
P.White 1–6, C.Hanlon 1–1 & P.Quinn 0–2.

Dr. Cullen Park, Carlow

20 May 1951
Preliminary Round

Offaly	1–3 – 1–8	Dublin

St. Conleth's Park, Newbridge
Referee: W Geraghty (Laois)

20 May 1951
Preliminary Round

Longford	2–5 – 1–8	Carlow

O'Moore Park, Portlaoise

27 May 1951
Preliminary Round Replay

Longford	1–7 – 1–1	Carlow

Cusack Park, Mullingar

27 May 1951
Quarter-Final

Louth	2–9 – 2–6	Kildare
		C.Burke 1–1, C.Hanlon 1–0, P.White 0–3 & L.O'Brien 0–2.

Croke Park, Dublin

27 May 1951
Quarter-Final

Wexford	2–5 – 2–5	Westmeath

O'Moore Park, Portlaoise

3 June 1951
Quarter-Final

Laois	1–12 – 2–2	Longford

O'Connor Park, Tullamore

3 June 1951
Quarter-Final

Meath	0–11 – 1–5	Dublin

Drogheda Park, Drogheda

10 June 1951
Quarter-Final Replay

Wexford	1–10 – 2–5	Westmeath

Croke Park, Dublin

1 July 1951
Semi-Final

Laois	1–9 – 2–4	Wexford

Dr. Cullen Park, Carlow

8 July 1951
Semi-Final

Meath	0–6 – 0–6	Louth

Croke Park, Dublin

22 July 1951
Semi-Final Replay

Meath	0–7 – 0–6	Louth

Croke Park, Dublin

5 August 1951
Final

Meath	4–9 – 0–3	Laois
Frankie Byrne 1–2 (0-2f), Jim Reilly 1–2, Brian Smyth and Matty McDonnell 1–1 each, Paddy Meegan 0-2f, Peter McDermott 0–1		Tommy Murphy 0–2 (0–1 pen) and Des Connolly 0-1f

Croke Park, Dublin
Attendance: 32,484
Referee: Paddy Mythen (Wexford)

=== Munster Senior Football Championship ===
3 June 1951
Quarter-Final

Clare	1–7 – 1–5	Tipperary

Austin Stack Park, Tralee
Referee: J. Brosnan (K)

3 June 1951
Quarter-Final

Cork	2–13 – 2–4	Limerick
E. Young (0–1), C. McGrath (0–7), D. O'Sullivan (0–3), M. Cahill (0–3) & P. Spillane (2–0).

Buttevant Sportsfield, Buttevant

24 June 1951
Semi-Final

Cork	4–9 – 1–1	Clare
N. Duggan (0–1), C. McGrath (0–2), C. O'Sullivan (0–2), M. Cahill (4–1), P. Spillane (0–1) & D. Kellaher (0–1).

Cork Athletic Grounds, Cork

1 July 1951
Semi-Final

Kerry	5–6 – 1–1	Waterford
J. Brosnan (0–1), P. Godley (0–3), S. O'Connor (2–0), F. O'Keeffe (1–1), E. Kennelly (1–0) & Tom Ashe (1–1).

Walsh Park, Waterford

15 July 1951
Final

Kerry	1–6 – 0–4	Cork
D. Hanafin (Snr) (1–0), T. Ashe (0–3), S. O'Connor (0–1), P. Godley (0–1) & G. O'Sullivan (0–1).		C. McGrath (0–1) & M. Cahill (0–1).

Fitzgerald Stadium, Killarney

=== Ulster Senior Football Championship ===
3 June 1951
Quarter-Final

Antrim	2–7 – 2–7	Donegal

O'Donnell Park, Letterkenny

17 June 1951
Quarter-Final

Armagh	7–13 – 2–3	Tyrone

Athletic Grounds, Armagh

17 June 1951
Quarter-Final Replay

Antrim	1–6 – 1–5	Donegal

Corrigan Park, Belfast

17 June 1951
Quarter-Final

Cavan	2–9 – 0–7	Down
P Donohoe (0–4), T Tighe (1–4), Cassidy (1–1)		Denvir (0–1), Fitzsimmons (0–3), Fitzmaurice (0–3)

O'Raghallaigh Park, Kingscourt

24 June 1951
Quarter-Final

Derry	1–3 – 0–5	Monaghan

Rossa Park, Magherafelt

1 July 1951
Semi-Final

Antrim	1–8 – 0–5	Armagh

Fr. Peter Campbell Park, Coalisland

8 July 1951
Semi-Final

Cavan	1–6 – 1–4	Derry
P Donohoe (0–2), T Tighe (0–2), Mc Enroe (1–1), Ed Carolan (0–1)		J E Mullan (0–3), J Murphy (1–0), P Keenan (0–1)

The Playing Fields, Lurgan
Attendance: 7,000

29 July 1951
Final

Antrim	1–7 – 2–3	Cavan
D Forde (1–1), Pa O Hara (0–1), K Armstrong (0–2), J Mc Callin (0–1), R Beirne (0–2)		P Donohoe (1–2), Ed Carolan (1–1)

St. Tiernach's Park, Clones
Attendance: 33,000

=== All-Ireland Senior Football Championship ===
12 August 1951
Semi-Final

Mayo	1–5 – 1–5	Kerry
P Irwin (0–1), S Mulderrig (0–3, one free), T Langan (1–0) & P Solan (0–1).		J. J. Sheehan (0–1), D. Hanafin (Snr) (0–1), P. Godley (1–0), T. Ashe (0–2) & G. O'Sullivan (0–1).

Croke Park, Dublin
Attendance: 39,971

19 August 1951
Semi-Final

Meath	2–6 – 1–7	Antrim

Croke Park, Dublin
Attendance: 45,888

9 September 1951
Semi-Final Replay

Mayo	2–4 – 1–5	Kerry
E Mongey (0–1), P Carney (0–1, free), S Mulderrig (0–1) & M Flanagan (2–1).		E. Dowling (1–1), G. O'Sullivan (0–1) & T. Ashe (0–1).

Croke Park, Dublin
Attendance: 57,345

23 September 1951
Final

Mayo	2–8 – 0–9	Meath
E Mongey (0–1), P Irwin (0–1), P Carney (0–5, four free), T Langan (1–0) & J Gilvarry (1–1).		P. Meegan & P. McDermott (0–2), C. Hand, J. Reilly, M. McDonnell, F. Byrne & D. Taafle (0–1).

Croke Park, Dublin
Attendance: 78,201
Referee: Bill Delaney (Laois)

== Championship statistics ==
=== Miscellaneous ===
- Limerick back in the Munster championship after 2 year rest break.
- In fact the Leinster football championship saw a triple of draws and replays they were in the following games as we know,

– Preliminary Round, Longford vs Carlow. – Quarter-Final, Wexford vs Westmeath. – Semi-Final, Meath vs Louth.

- The All Ireland semi-final between Meath and Antrim was their first championship meeting.
- Mayo are All Ireland Champions for 2 in a row and Connacht Champions for 4 in a row.
