= 1954 All-Ireland Senior Football Championship =

Football championship

Championship details
- Dates: May 9 – September 26, 1954
- Teams: 28

All-Ireland Champions
- Winning team: Meath (2nd win)
- Captain: Peter McDermott
- Manager: P. Tully

All-Ireland Finalists
- Losing team: Kerry
- Captain: John Dowling

Provincial Champions
- Munster: Kerry
- Leinster: Meath
- Ulster: Cavan
- Connacht: Galway

Championship statistics
- No. matches played: 24

The 1954 All-Ireland Senior Football Championship was the 68th staging of Ireland's premier Gaelic football knock-out competition.

Meath were the winners.

Note the Munster football championship did not have Quarter-Finals. Limerick did not take part (1953–1964) while Clare skipped a year.

== Results ==
=== Connacht Senior Football Championship ===
13 June 1954
Quarter-Final

Mayo	4–9 – 1–7	Roscommon
P Irwin (0–1), J Nallen; F Leonard, T Langan (0–3), S O’Donnell; M Flanagan (2–1), D O’Neill (1–3, two frees) & P Solan (1–1).

McHale Park, Castlebar
Attendance: 15,000

27 June 1954
Semi-Final

Sligo	1–8 – 1–7	Leitrim

Carrick-on-Shannon

4 July 1954
Semi-Final

Galway	2–4 – 1–5	Mayo
		T Langan (0–1), S O’Donnell (0–1) & D O’Neill (0–3).

Tuam Stadium, Tuam
Attendance: 5,000

18 July 1954
Final

Galway	2–10 – 3–4	Sligo

Tuam Stadium, Tuam
Attendance: 15,000

=== Leinster Senior Football Championship ===
9 May 1954
Preliminary Round

Longford	1–6 – 0–7	Laois

O'Connor Park, Tullamore

23 May 1954
Preliminary Round

Kildare	1–5 – 0–8	Carlow
P.White 0–3, L.McCormack 0–1, P.Mooney 0–1

Dr. Cullen Park, Carlow

30 May 1954
Preliminary Round 1st Replay

Kildare	1–9 – 2–6 A.E.T.	Carlow
L.McCormack 1–1, P.White, S.Harrison 0–2, D.Dalton 0–1

Dr. Cullen Park, Carlow

13 June 1954
Preliminary Round

Meath	1–9 – 1–8	Wicklow

Croke Park, Dublin

13 June 1954
Preliminary Round 2nd Replay

Kildare	1–7 – 1–6	Carlow
D.Dalton 1–1. P.White 0–3, R.Swan 0–2, M.Byrne, F.Marron, P.Mooney 0–1

Geraldine Park, Athy

23 May 1954
Quarter-Final

Dublin	0–11 – 0–2	Louth

Drogheda Park, Drogheda

30 May 1954
Quarter-Final

Longford	1–7 – 1–4	Westmeath

Pearse Park, Longford

30 May 1954
Quarter-Final

Wexford	0–7 – 1–5	Offaly

Dr. Cullen Park, Carlow
Referee: W Delaney (Laois)

27 June 1954
Quarter-Final

Meath	3–2 – 0–5	Kildare
		P.Mooney 0–3, P.White, S.Harrison 0–2, L.McCormack 0–1

Croke Park, Dublin

4 July 1954
Semi-Final

Dublin	2–4 – 2–5	Offaly

O'Moore Park, Portlaoise
Referee: W Goodison (Wexford)

11 July 1954
Semi-Final

Meath	2–9 – 1–5	Longford

Pearse Park, Longford

25 July 1954
Final

Meath	4–7 – 2–10	Offaly
Tom Moriarty 2–0, Paddy Meegan 1–3 (0-3f), Peter McDermott 1–1, Paddy Connell, Michael Grace, Billy Ratigan 0–1 each		Paddy Casey 1–4 (1-2f), Johnny Kinahan 1–0, Christy Carroll 0–2, Sean Foran, Mick Furlong, Alo Kelly (0-1f), Paddy Fenlon 0–1 each

Croke Park, Dublin
Attendance: 44,109
Referee: Bill Goodison (Wexford)

=== Munster Senior Football Championship ===
Note there were no Quarter-Final's were played Limerick didn't complete (1953–1964) while Clare decided to skip the Munster championships for just 1 year. This means that Kerry, Cork, Tipperary and Waterford would go on straight to the Semi-Final's with the winners of both matches qualify for the final.

4 July 1954
Semi-Final

Kerry	3–10 – 1–2	Waterford
T. Moriarty (0–1), C. Kennelly (0–1), J. J. Sheehan (0–1) P. Sheehy (0–2), B. Buckley (2–1), S. Kelly (0–2) & J. Lyne (1–2).

Walsh Park, Waterford

4 July 1954
Semi-Final

Cork	3–11 – 2–7	Tipperary
D. Kellaher (0–1), N. Fitzgerald (0–2), J. Hartnett (2–0), N. Duggan (0–1), P. Harrington (0–1), J. J. Henichion (0–1) & Sub J. Lowery (1–5).

Ned Hall Park, Clonmel
Referee: J. O'Connell (L)

25 July 1954
Final

Kerry	4–9 – 2–3	Cork
P. Sheehy (0–3), T. Moriarty (0–1), T. Lyne (0–1), J. Brosnan (2–1), S. Kelly (1–2) & J. Lyne (1–1).		J. O’Donovan (2–1) & J. J. Henichion (0–2).

Cork Athletic Grounds, Cork

=== Ulster Senior Football Championship ===
13 June 1954
Quarter-Final

Tyrone	1–7 – 1–5	Donegal

O'Neill Park, Dungannon

13 June 1954
Quarter-Final

Derry	4–11 – 3–4	Down

St. Patrick's Park, Newcastle

10 July 1954
Quarter-Final

Armagh	1–8 – 1–6	Antrim

Casement Park, Belfast
Attendance: 4,000

27 July 1954
Quarter-Final

Cavan	3–8 – 2–5	Monaghan

St. Tiernach's Park, Clones

4 July 1954
Semi-Final

Armagh	1–12 – 2–6	Derry

Casement Park, Belfast

11 July 1954
Semi-Final

Cavan	3–10 – 2–10	Tyrone

St. Mary's Park, Castleblayney

25 July 1954
Final

Cavan	2–10 – 2–5	Armagh

St. Tiernach's Park, Clones

=== All-Ireland Senior Football Championship ===
1 August 1954
Semi-Final

Meath	1–5 – 0–7	Cavan

Croke Park, Dublin
Attendance: 42,123

15 August 1954
Semi-Final

Kerry	2–6 – 1–6	Galway
P. Sheehy (1–1), T. Lyne (1–3), J. Brosnan (0–1) & S. Kelly (0–1).

Croke Park, Dublin
Attendance: 40,740

26 September 1954
Final

Meath	1–13 – 1–7	Kerry
P. Meegan (0–5), T. Monriaty (1–2), B. Smyth (0–3), McDonnll 0–2 & P. McDermott (0–1).		J. J. Sheehan (1–1), J. Brosnan (0–2) & T. Lyne (0–4).

Croke Park, Dublin
Attendance: 75,276
Referee: Simon Deignan (Cavan)

== Championship statistics ==
=== Miscellaneous ===
- Munster championship did not have Quarter-finals, due to Limerick 2nd year not taking part while Clare skipped the year.
- Galway end a 9-year wait for the Connacht football title.
- The All Ireland final was Meath's first ever win over Kerry in history.
