= 1949 All-Ireland Senior Football Championship =

Football championship

All-Ireland Champions
- Winning team: Meath (1st win)
- Captain: Brain Symth
- Manager: P. Tully

All-Ireland Finalists
- Losing team: Cavan
- Captain: John Joe O’Reilly

Provincial Champions
- Munster: Cork
- Leinster: Meath
- Ulster: Cavan
- Connacht: Mayo

Championship statistics

The 1949 All-Ireland Senior Football Championship was the 63rd staging of Ireland's premier Gaelic football knock-out competition.

Despite Leitrim reaching the Connacht final withdraw from the championship for the next 3 years.

Meath won their first title. Ending Cavan's bid for 3 in a row.

== Results ==
=== Connacht Senior Football Championship ===
5 June 1949
Quarter-Final

Mayo	2–10 – 1–9	Roscommon
P Carney (0–7, frees), H Dixon (1–0), J Curran (1–1), P Solan (0–1) & M Flanagan (0–1).

Corran Park, Ballymote
Attendance: 20,000

12 June 1949
Semi-Final

Leitrim	3–3 – 1–7	Galway

Carrick-on-Shannon
Attendance: 9,000

19 June 1949
Semi-Final

Mayo	7–10 – 0–2	Sligo
P Carney (0–6, two ‘50’s), W Kenny (0–1), Joe Gilvarry (1–0); L Hastings (1–1) & P Solan (5–2).

James Stephens Park, Ballina

31 July 1949
Final

Mayo	4–6 – 0–3	Leitrim
P Carney (0–3, frees), T Langan (0–1), L Hastings (1–0); Joe Gilvarry (1–1) & P Solan (2–1).

St. Coman's Park, Roscommon

=== Leinster Senior Football Championship ===
1 May 1949
Preliminary Round

Dublin	2–9 – 2–5	Longford

Cusack Park, Mullingar

8 May 1949
Preliminary Round

Westmeath	3–7 – 1–5	Carlow

O'Moore Park, Portlaoise

15 May 1949
Preliminary Round

Meath	0–11 – 1–5	Kildare
		B.Edwards 1–0, S.Brennan, K.O'Donovan, P.White, M.O'Brien, P.Lyons 0–1.

Croke Park, Dublin

22 May 1949
Quarter-Final

Louth	0–7 – 0–5	Wicklow

Croke Park, Dublin

29 May 1949
Quarter-Final

Westmeath	2–5 – 0–7	Laois

O'Connor Park, Tullamore

5 June 1949
Quarter-Final

Offaly	4–7 – 3–7	Dublin

O'Moore Park, Portlaoise

12 June 1949
Quarter-Final

Meath	0–14 – 4–0	Wexford

Croke Park, Dublin

10 July 1949
Semi-Final

Offaly	1–9 – 2–6	Westmeath

O'Connor Park, Tullamore
Referee: J Dowling (Kildare)

3 July 1949
Semi-Final

Meath	1–5 – 1–5	Louth

Croke Park, Dublin
Attendance: 32,000

10 July 1949
Semi-Final Replay

Meath	2–9 – 3–6 (AET)	Louth

Croke Park, Dublin

17 July 1949
Semi-Final Replay

Offaly	1–2 – 0–8	Westmeath

Cusack Park, Mullingar
Referee: J Dowling (Kildare)

24 July 1949
Semi-Final Replay No. 2

Meath	2–5 – 1–7	Louth

Croke Park, Dublin

31 July 1949
Final

Meath	4–5 – 0–6	Westmeath
Paddy Meegan and Peter McDermott 2–0 each, Frankie Byrne 0-2f, Brian Smyth, Pat Carolan, Matty McDonnell (0-1f) 0–1 each		Peter Molloy 0-5f and Johnny Ward 0-1f

Croke Park, Dublin
Attendance: 37,102
Referee: J. Dowling (Kildare)

=== Munster Senior Football Championship ===
22 May 1949
Quarter-Final

Tipperary	3–8 – 3–4	Waterford

Fraher Field, Dungarvan
Referee: M. Colbert (Limerick)

19 June 1949
Semi-Final

Clare	3–7 – 1–8	Kerry
		G. O'Sullivan (1–2), T. Ashe (0–1) & Willie O'Donnell (0–5).

Cusack Park, Ennis
Referee: Frank Cunniffe (Galway)

10 July 1949
Semi-Final

Cork	4–2 – 2–4	Tipperary
E. Young (1–0), D. O’Donavan (3–0), J. Cronin (0–1) & J. Lynam (0–1).

Fraher Field, Dungarvan
Referee: D. O'Sullivan (W)

31 July 1949
Final

Cork	3–6 – 0–7	Clare
P. O’Donnell (1–2), D. O’Donavan (1–1), J. Cronin (0–1), N. Duggan (0–1) & J. Lynam (1–0).

Gaelic Grounds, Limerick

=== Ulster Senior Football Championship ===
1 May 1949
Preliminary Round

Down	0–8 – 2–6	Monaghan

St. Patrick's Park, Newcastle

4 June 1949
Quarter-Final

Antrim	5–9 – 1–6	Derry

Rossa Park, Magherafelt

4 June 1949
Quarter-Final

Armagh	3–6 – 1–8	Monaghan

The Playing Fields, Lurgan

12 June 1949
Quarter-Final

Cavan	7–10 – 1–7	Tyrone

Breffni Park, Cavan

26 June 1949
Semi-Final

Antrim	1–6 – 3–7	Cavan
J Mc Callin (0–4), Pa O Hara (1–0), S Gibson (0–2)		P Donohoe (1–5), J Cassidy (1–0), M Higgins (0–1), T Tighe (0–1), V Sherlock (1–0)

Corrigan Park, Belfast

3 July 1949
Semi-Final

Armagh	0–14 – 1–4	Donegal

O'Neill Park, Dungannon

31 July 1949
Final

Cavan	1–7 – 1–6	Armagh
P Donohoe (1–2), Ed Carolan (0–3), V Sherlock (0–1), T Tighe (0–1)		S M Breen (1–1), G O Neill (0–2), W Mc Corry (0–1), A O Hagan (0–1), G Fegan (0–1)

St. Tiernach's Park, Clones
Attendance: 24,000

=== All-Ireland Senior Football Championship ===
14 August 1949
Semi-Final

Meath	3–10 – 1–10	Mayo
		P Carney (0–6, five frees), L Hastings (0–1), T Langan (1–0), P Solan (0–1) & Subs: M Flanagan (0–2).

Croke Park, Dublin
Attendance: 48,200

21 August 1949
Semi-Final

Cavan	1–9 – 2–3	Cork
P Donohoe (0–6), J Cassidy (1–0), J Stafford (0–1), T Tighe (0–1), P Brady (0–1)		J. Hartnett (1–0), D. O’Donavan (1–0) & J. Cronin (0–2).

Croke Park, Dublin
Attendance: 49,789

25 September 1949
Final

Meath	1–10 – 1–6	Cavan
M Mc Donnell (0–1), F Byrne (0–4), P Meegan (0–1), Morris (0–1), B Smyth (0–1), P Mc Dermott (0–1), W Halfpenny (1–0), P Connell (0–1)		P Donohoe (0–6), M Higgins (1–0)

Croke Park, Dublin
Attendance: 79,460
Referee: D. Ryan (Kerry)

== Championship statistics ==
=== Miscellaneous ===
- Despite reaching Connacht final Leitrim withdraw from championship for 3 years.
- Clare beat Kerry for the first time ever.
- For the second time in history Meath had played Louth 3 times it previously happened in 1919.
- The All Ireland semi-final between Meath and Mayo was their first championship meeting.
- Meath are All Ireland Champions for the first time.
