= Mick Wyse =

Irish hurler (1908–1970)

Personal information
- Born: 25 June 1908 Waterford, Ireland
- Died: 18 May 1970 (aged 61) Waterford, Ireland
- Occupations: Technician, security officer

Sport
- Sport: Hurling
Club
- Years: Club
- 1927–1948: Erin's Own
Club titles
- Waterford titles: 12
Inter-county
- Years: County
- 1928–1939: Waterford
Inter-county titles
- Munster titles: 0
- All-Irelands: 0
- NHL: 0

Michael Wyse (25 June 1908 – 18 May 1970) was an Irish hurler. At club level he played with Erin's Own, and also lined out at inter-county level with various Waterford teams.

== Career ==
Wyse's club career with Erin's Own spanned three decades. He had the distinction of lining out in every position on the field and won 12 Waterford SHC medals between 1927 and 1948.

At inter-county level, Wyse's career with the Waterford senior hurling team began in 1928. He continued to line out until 1939, however, he enjoyed little in the way of success during this period.

== Personal life and death ==
Wyse was born in Waterford in June 1908. His brother, Sonny Wyse, was also a hurler with Waterford. Wyse spent much of his working life as a technician with the Post Office in Waterford. He took up a position as a security officer with Waterford Glass in December 1968.

Wyse died on 18 May 1970, at the age of 61.

== Honours ==
Erin's Own

- Waterford Senior Hurling Championship: 1927, 1928, 1929, 1930, 1931, 1932, 1933, 1934, 1935, 1942, 1946, 1947
