= Sonny Wyse =

Irish hurler (1912–1972)

Daniel Wyse
Personal information
- Nickname: Sonny
- Born: 25 July 1912 Waterford, Ireland
- Died: 29 November 1972 (aged 60) Waterford, Ireland
- Occupation: Corporation worker
- Height: 5 ft 9.5 in (176.5 cm)

Sport
- Sport: Hurling
- Position: Corner-forward
Clubs
- Years: Club
- 1929–1947: Mount Sion; Erin's Own
Club titles
- Waterford titles: 10
Inter-county
- Years: County
- 1931–1943: Waterford
Inter-county titles
- Munster titles: 1
- All-Irelands: 1
- NHL: 0

Daniel Wyse (25 July 1912 – 29 November 1972), known as Sonny Wyse, was an Irish hurler. At club level he played with Mount Sion and Erin's Own, and also lined out at inter-county level with various Waterford teams.

== Playing career ==
Wyse's club career began with Mount Sion, however, he later transferred to the Erin's Own club. He was one of the mainstays of the team for nearly two decades and won ten Waterford SHC medals between 1929 and 1947.

At inter-county level, Wyse first appeared for Waterford at minor level. He was a member of the team that beat Meath to win the All-Ireland MHC title in 1929. In an era when many players were overage for the minor grade but continued to line out, Wyse earned the distinction in 1931 of becoming the first player to be selected for the Waterford minor and senior teams.

Wyse's performances for the senior team lead to his immediate selection for the Munster team and he won a Railway Cup medal in 1934. He claimed a Munster SHC medal in 1938 and was a reserve when Waterford suffered a defeat by Dublin in that year's All-Ireland final. Wyse continued to line out with Waterford until 1943.

== Personal life and death ==
Wyse was born in Waterford in July 1912. His brother, Mick Wyse, was also a hurler with Waterford. Wyse was a long-time employee of Waterford Corporation.

Wyse died on 29 November 1972, at the age of 60. He was posthumously selected on the Waterford Hurling Team of the Century in 1984.

== Honours ==
Erin's Own

- Waterford Senior Hurling Championship: 1929, 1930, 1931, 1932, 1933, 1934, 1935, 1942, 1946, 1947

Waterford

- Munster Senior Hurling Championship: 1938
- All-Ireland Minor Hurling Championship: 1929
- Munster Minor Hurling Championship: 1929

Munster

- Railway Cup: 1934
