= List of Waterford senior hurling team captains =

This article lists players who have recently captained the Waterford county hurling team in the Munster Senior Hurling Championship and the All-Ireland Senior Hurling Championship. Until 2007, the captain was chosen from the club that had won the Waterford Senior Hurling Championship.

== List of captains ==
Year	Player(s)	Club(s)	National titles	Provincial titles	Ref
1913	Willie Hough	De La Salle			
1929	Charlie Ware	Erin's Own			
1930		Erin's Own			
1931	Charlie Ware	Erin's Own			
1932					
1933	Charlie Ware	Erin's Own			
1934					
1935					
1936					
1937					
1938	Mick Hickey	Portlaw			
1938	Willie Walsh	Passage		Munster Hurling Final winning captain	
1938	Mick Hickey	Portlaw			
1939	John Keane	Mount Sion			
1940	John Keane	Mount Sion			
1941	John Keane	Mount Sion			
1942					
1943	Jim Ware	Erin's Own			
1944					
1945					
1946					
1947	Jim Ware	Erin's Own			
1948	Jim Ware	Erin's Own	All-Ireland Hurling Final winning captain	Munster Hurling Final winning captain	
1949	John Keane	Mount Sion			
1950					
1951					
1952	J. O'Regan	Mount Sion			
1953	John Cusack	Clonea			
1954	Mick Flannelly	Mount Sion			
1955	Mick Flannelly	Mount Sion			
1956	Séamus Power	Mount Sion			
1957	Phil Grimes	Mount Sion		Munster Hurling Final winning captain	
1958	Séamus Power	Mount Sion			
1959	Frankie Walsh	Mount Sion	All-Ireland Hurling Final winning captain	Munster Hurling Final winning captain	
1960	Frankie Walsh	Mount Sion			
1961	Martin Óg Morrissey	Mount Sion			
1962	Larry Guinan	Mount Sion			
1963	Joe Condon	Erin's Own		Munster Hurling Final winning captain	
1964	Mick Flannelly	Mount Sion			
1965	Larry Guinan	Mount Sion			
1966	Jim Byrne	Mount Sion			
1967	Tom Hearne	Ballygunner			
1968	Vin Connors	Ballygunner			
1969	Tom Walsh	Ballygunner			
1970	Larry Guinan	Mount Sion			
1971	Frank Whelan	Ballyduff-Lower-Portlaw			
1972	Martin Hickey	Portlaw			
1973	Stephen Greene	Mount Sion			
1974	Martin Hickey	Portlaw			
1975	Martin Geary	Mount Sion			
1976					
1977	John Galvin	Portlaw			
1978	Peter Whelan	Portlaw			
1979	Joe Murphy	Dunhill			
1980	Joe Murphy	Dunhill			
1981	Liam O'Brien	Tallow			
1982	Pat McGrath	Mount Sion			
1983	Séamie Hannon	Ballyduff Upper			
1984	Pat Ryan	Mount Sion			
1985	Con Curley	Tallow			
1986	Timmy Sheehan	Tallow			
1987	Pat Ryan	Mount Sion			
1988	Michael Walsh	Ballyduff Upper			
1989	Shane Ahearne	Mount Sion			
1990	Kieran Delahunty	Roanmore			
1991	Noel Crowley	Roanmore			
1992	Paul Prendergast	Lismore			
1993	Billy O'Sullivan	Ballygunner			
1994	Mark O'Sullivan	Lismore			
1995	Brian Greene	Mount Sion			
1996	Fergal Hartley	Ballygunner			
1997	Fergal Hartley	Ballygunner			
1998	Stephen Frampton	Ballygunner			
1999	Brian Flannery	Mount Sion			
2000	Paul Flynn	Ballygunner			
2001	Ken McGrath	Mount Sion			
2002	Fergal Hartley	Ballygunner		Munster Hurling Final winning captain	
2003	Tony Browne	Mount Sion			
2004	Ken McGrath	Mount Sion		Munster Hurling Final winning captain	
2005	Eoin Kelly	Mount Sion			
2006	Paul Flynn	Ballygunner			
2007	Michael 'Brick' Walsh	Stradbally		Munster Hurling Final winning capt National hurling league winning capt	
2008	Michael 'Brick' Walsh	Stradbally			
2009	Stephen Molumphy; Ken McGrath	Ballyduff Upper; Mount Sion			
2010	Stephen Molumphy	Ballyduff Upper		Munster Hurling Final winning captain	
2011	Stephen Molumphy	Ballyduff Upper			
2012	Michael 'Brick' Walsh	Stradbally			
2013	Kevin Moran	De La Salle			
2014	Michael 'Brick' Walsh	Stradbally			
2015	Kevin Moran	De La Salle		National hurling league winning capt	
2016	Kevin Moran	De La Salle			
2017	Kevin Moran	De La Salle			
2018	Kevin Moran	De La Salle			
2019	Noel Connors	Passage			
2020	Pauric Mahony	Ballygunner			
2021	Stehen Bennett	Ballysaggart			
