= List of people from Waterford =

The following is a list of people from Waterford, Ireland.

== Ecclesiastics ==
- Richard Chenevix (1697–1779), Church of Ireland bishop
- Charles Joseph Henderson (1924–2006), Auxiliary Bishop of Southwark (UK) and Bishop of Tricala
- Tobias Kirby (1804–1895), Rector of the Irish College Rome 1850–1891; archbishop of Ephesus 1885
- Michael O'Hickey (1860–1916), priest, Professor of Irish at Maynooth University
- Nicholas Quemerford (c. 1554–1599), Irish Jesuit priest
- Edmund Ignatius Rice (1762–1844), religious founder
- Michael Sheehan (1870–1945), Archbishop of Germia; author, professor
- Luke Wadding (1588–1657), theologian, historian, patriot
- Michael Wadding (1591–1644), Jesuit priest and missionary to New Spain
- Nicholas Wiseman (1802–1865), cardinal

== Sport ==
- Jessie Barr (born 1989), Olympic athlete
- Thomas Barr (born 1992), Olympic athlete
- Jim Beglin (born 1963), soccer player
- Craig Breen (1990–2023), rally driver
- Niamh Briggs (born 1984), Irish international rugby player
- Locky Byrne (1913–1941), hurler
- Tom Cheasty (1934–2007), hurler
- Paddy Coad (1920–1992), soccer player
- Tom Cunningham (1931–2022), hurler
- Pat Fanning (1918–2010), hurler, GAA President
- Mick Flannelly (1930–2021), hurler
- Andy Fleming (1916–2011), hurler
- Austin Flynn (1933–2021), hurler
- Philly Grimes (1929–1989), hurler
- Larry Guinan (born 1937), hurler
- Alfie Hale (born 1939), soccer player
- Noel Hunt (born 1982), Irish international soccer player
- Stephen Hunt (born 1981), Irish international soccer player
- John Keane (1917–1975), hurler
- Sean Kelly (born 1956), Ireland's most successful racing cyclist, one of the top eight cyclists of all time
- Martin Óg Morrissey (1934–2024), hurler
- Christy Moylan (1916–1996), hurler
- Daryl Murphy (born 1983), Irish international soccer player
- Johnny O'Connor (1928–2010), hurler
- Peter O'Connor (1872–1957), athlete, Olympic champion
- John O'Shea (born 1981), Irish international soccer player
- Ciarán Power (born 1976), Olympic Games cyclist 2000, 2004
- Ned Power (1929–2007), hurler
- Seamus Power (1929–2016), hurler
- Susan Smith-Walsh (born 1971), Olympic athlete
- John Treacy (born 1957), Olympic athlete, world champion
- Frankie Walsh (1936–2012), hurler
- Patricia Walsh (born 1960), Olympic athlete
- Charlie Ware (1933–2013), hurler
- Jim Ware (1908–1983), hurler

== Politics and military ==
- William Charles Bonaparte-Wyse (1826–1892), soldier
- Mary Butler (born 1966), politician
- Denis Cashman (1843–1897), Fenian, patriot
- Lorraine Clifford-Lee (born 1981), Fianna Fáil politician, senator
- Paudie Coffey (born 1969), Minister of State for Housing and planning from 2014 to 2016
- Hugh Collender, Young Irelander, businessman
- John Condon (1897–1915), boy soldier, youngest Allied soldier to die in First World War
- Edward Collins (1941–2019), Fine Gael politician
- Ciara Conway (born 1980), former Labour Party politician
- Martin Cullen (born 1954), former Fianna Fáil politician
- David Cullinane (born 1974), Sinn Féin politician
- Maurice Cummins (born 1953), Fine Gael politician
- Austin Deasy (1936–2017), Fine Gael politician
- John Deasy (born 1967), Fine Gael politician
- Frank Edwards (1907–1983), left wing activist, Spanish Civil War fighter
- Francis Hearn, patriot
- John Hearne (1893–1969), orator, lawyer and architect of the 1937 Irish Constitution, or Bunracht na hÉireann
- William Hobson (1792–1842), first Governor of New Zealand
- Billy Kenneally (1925–2009), Fianna Fáil politician, twice Mayor of Waterford
- Brendan Kenneally (born 1955), former Fianna Fáil politician
- Thomas Kyne (1905–1981), Labour Party politician
- George Lennon (1900–1991), vice commanding officer, West Waterford I.R.A. (1919–1922)
- Patrick Little (1884–1963), Fianna Fáil politician, Minister for Posts and Telegraphs
- Thaddeus Lynch (1901–1966), Fine Gael politician
- Thomas Francis Meagher (1823–1867), patriot, conceived the Irish tricolour
- Thomas Meagher (1796–1874), politician and businessman
- Richard Mulcahy, (1886–1971), Irish Army C.O.C., Fine Gael politician
- Ann Ormonde (born 1935), former Fianna Fáil politician
- William Palliser (1830–1882), politician, inventor
- John Paul Phelan (born 1978), politician
- John Redmond (1856–1918), leader of the Irish Party in Westminster
- Frederick Roberts, 1st Earl Roberts (1832–1914), British Army C.O.C.
- Thomas Sexton (1848–1932), journalist, financial expert, nationalist politician and Member of Parliament
- Richard Lalor Shiel (1791–1851), Orator, M.P
- Alfred Webb (1834–1908), President of the 1894 Indian National Congress and MP for West Waterford

== Science ==
- Lucien Bonaparte-Wyse (1845–1909), entomologist
- Robert Boyle (1627–1691), physicist
- Richard J. Ussher (1841–1913), ornithologist
- Ernest Walton (1903–1995), Nobel Laureate (Physics 1951)

== Arts, theatre and entertainment ==
- Keith Barry (born 1976), magician, mentalist, illusionist
- Carrie Crowley (born 1964), TV personality
- Teresa Deevy (1894–1963), playwright
- Val Doonican (1927–2015), entertainer
- Seán Dunne (1956–1995), poet
- Fiona Glascott (born 1982), actress
- Dorothea Jordan (1761–1816), actress; mistress of King William IV of the United Kingdom
- Charles Kean (1811–1868), Shakespearean actor
- Anna Manahan (1924–2009), actress
- Gerardine Meaney (born 1962), feminist critic
- Dervla Murphy (1931–2022), travel writer
- Gilbert O'Sullivan (born 1946), singer-songwriter
- Patrick C. Power (1862–1951), writer and historian
- Hal Roach (1927–2012), comedian
- Frank Ryan (1900–1965), tenor
- William Vincent Wallace (1814–1865), opera composer

== General ==
- Eugene Byrne (born 1959), author, journalist
- Risteard De Hindeberg (1863–1916), priest, Irish language activist, author, musician
- Grattan Flood (1857–1928), musicologist and historian
- Valentine Greatrakes (1628–1682), 17th-century healer
- John Hogan (1800–1858), sculptor
- Donnchadh Ruadh Mac Conmara (1715–1810), teacher, poet
- Ellen Organ (1903–1908), saintly child known as "Little Nellie of Holy God"
- Thomas Sautelle Roberts (c. 1749–1778), landscape artist
- Mary Strangman (1872–1943), doctor, public health advocate and women's suffragist.
