= 1959 All-Ireland Senior Hurling Championship final =

1959 All-Ireland Senior Hurling Final
- Event: 1959 All-Ireland Senior Hurling Championship
Waterford	Kilkenny
1-17 3-12	5-5 1-10
- Date: 6 September 1959; 4 October 1959 (replay)
- Venue: Croke Park, Dublin
- Referee: G. Fitzgerald (Limerick)
- Attendance: 73,707; 77,285 (replay)

The 1959 All-Ireland Senior Hurling Championship Final took place on 6 September 1959 at Croke Park, Dublin. It was the 72nd All-Ireland final and was contested by Waterford and Kilkenny.

The match ended level. This was the last All-Ireland Senior Hurling Championship Final at the end of which the teams finished level until 2012.

The first game ended level with a score of 1-17 to 5-5. A replay took place at the same venue four weeks later on 4 October 1959. On that occasion the Leinster champions lost to their Munster opponents on a score line of 3-12 to 1-10.

This was Waterford's second ever All-Ireland title. They have yet to win a third losing their next four final appearances in 1963, 2008, 2017 and 2020 respectively.

== All-Ireland final ==
=== Overview ===
The All-Ireland senior hurling final saw Waterford lining out in only their fourth ever championship decider. They last played in the All-Ireland final two years earlier in 1957 when they were defeated by Kilkenny. Waterford last won the title in 1948 when they defeated Dublin.

=== Match reports ===
Sunday 6 September was the date of the 1959 All-Ireland senior hurling final between Waterford and Kilkenny. The attendance of 73,707 was not disappointed and was treated to some splendid hurling by both teams in one of the great All-Ireland finals. An exciting first half of hurling saw Waterford take a five-point lead. Immediately after the restart Tom Cheasty scored a memorable point after he stormed past five Kilkenny defenders who, according to Radio Éireann commentator Michael O'Hehir, fell around him ‘like dying wasps.’ Waterford were masters at pure hurling; however, the downside of this was that they found it difficult to close out games and win easily. This was a factor on this occasion against Kilkenny. Two quick goals by Tommy O'Connell put Kilkenny ahead by two goals with just a minute left in the game. With the score at 5-5 to 0-17 Waterford needed a goal. A stroke of luck saw ‘the Decies’ awarded a sideline cut. Team captain Frankie Walsh stepped up to take it when he saw Séamus Power bursting out of midfield with his hand raised looking for the sliothar. Walsh fluffed the sideline cut and the sliothar only went a few yards. However, Larry Guinan was running forward and he collected the sliothar. He had only one thing in mind as he headed straight for the goalmouth. He fired in a shot that full-back Jim ‘Link’ Walsh deflected past his goalkeeper Ollie Walsh. The final whistle blew immediately and the score line read Waterford 1-17, Kilkenny 5-5.

Four weeks later on 4 October 77,285 returned to Croke Park to see the second installment of the All-Ireland final between Waterford and Kilkenny. The second game began terribly for Waterford, in spite of playing with a strong wind, and they trailed by 1-4 to 0-1 after only twelve minutes of play. Frankie Walsh also had a torrid time as he failed to raise the sliothar for a close-in free. All of a sudden, however, Waterford clicked into gear. Mick Flannelly, a player from the Mount Sion club, goaled to get Waterford’s game back on track. Tom Cunningham added a second with a brilliant overhead strike before Tom Cheasty also goaled. After a disastrous start Waterford led by 3-6 to 1-8 at the interval. The second-half saw Joe Harney and Austin Flynn excelling in defence, so much so that Kilkenny only scored two points from Eddie Keher over the course of the thirty minutes. Waterford, on the other hand, forged ahead with Walsh and Cheasty excelling. After 120 minutes of hurling played out in front of an aggregate attendance of 150,000 Waterford took their second All-Ireland title by 3-12 to 1-10.

== TV coverage ==
The match was recorded by the BBC and highlights where shown in Sportsview on BBC television on the Wednesday following the final. The commentary was done by Kenneth Wolstenholme who is famous for the words “some people are on the pitch, they think its all over, it is now” at the end of the 1966 Association Football World Cup Final.

== Match details ==
=== First game ===
1959-09-06
15:15 UTC+1

Waterford	1-17 – 5-5	Kilkenny
F. Walsh (0-5), T. Cheasty (0-5), S. Power (1-0), P. Grimes (0-3), L. Guinan (0-2), J. Kiely (0-2).		T. O'Connell (3-0), R. Carroll (1-2), P. Dwyer (1-1), P. Kelly (0-1), S. Clohessy (0-1).

Croke Park, Dublin
Attendance: 73,707
Referee: G. Fitzgerald (Limerick)

=== Replay ===
1959-10-04
15:15 UTC+1

Waterford	3-12 – 1-10	Kilkenny
T. Cheasty (2-2), F. Walsh (0-8), M. Flannelly (1-1), L. Guinan (0-1).		P . Dwyer (0-5), D. Heaslip (1-1), E. Keher (0-2), S. Clohessy (0-1), M. Walsh (0-1).

Croke Park, Dublin
Attendance: 77,285
Referee: G. Fitzgerald (Limerick)

Waterford Team For Replay 1 Ned Power 2 Joseph Harney 3 Austin Flynn 4 John Barron 5 Mick Lacey 6 Martin Og Morrissey 7 Jackie Condon 8 Seamus Power 9 Phil Grimes 10 Mick Flannelly 11 Tom Cheasty 12 Frankie Walsh 13 Larry Guinan 14 Tom Cunningham 15 John Kiely Substitutes 17 Michael O'Connor for Mick Lacey 18 Donal Duck Whelan for Tom Cunningham Unused Substitutes 19 Charlie Ware who was in the starting 15 for every championship game that year except for the all Ireland final replay. 20 Freddie O'Brien 21 Joe Coady 22 Paudie Casey Manager Pat Fanning Trainer John Keane Selectors Jim Ware Michael O'Connor
