= 1948 Waterford Senior Hurling Championship =

Annual hurling competition season

- Champions: Mount Sion (6th title)
- Runners-up: Avonmore

The 1948 Waterford Senior Hurling Championship was the 48th staging of the Waterford Senior Hurling Championship since its establishment by the Waterford County Board in 1897.

Erin's Own were the defending champions.

On 12 December 1948, Mount Sion won the championship after a 9–07 to 0–05 defeat of Avonmore in the final. This was their sixth championship title overall and their first title since 1945.
