= 1957 All-Ireland Senior Hurling Championship final =

1957 All-Ireland Senior Hurling Final
- Event: 1957 All-Ireland Senior Hurling Championship
Kilkenny	Waterford
4-10	3-12
- Date: 1 September 1957
- Venue: Croke Park, Dublin
- Referee: S. Gleeson (Limerick)
- Attendance: 70,594

The 1957 All-Ireland Senior Hurling Championship Final was the 70th All-Ireland Final and marked the culmination of the 1957 All-Ireland Senior Hurling Championship, an inter-county hurling tournament for the top teams in Ireland. The match was held at Croke Park, Dublin, on 1 September 1957, between Kilkenny and Waterford. The Munster champions lost to their Leinster opponents on a score line of 4–10 to 3–12. It was the fifth time for Kilkenny to win a final by a point. An interesting feature of this match was the participation of the English actor John Gregson in the Kilkenny team's parade as part of his role as a GAA player in the film Rooney.

== Match details ==
1957-09-01
15:15 UTC+1

Kilkenny	4-10 – 3-12	Waterford

Croke Park, Dublin
Attendance: 70,594
Referee: S. Gleeson (Limerick)

KILKENNY:
GK	1	Ollie Walsh
RCB	2	T. Walsh
FB	3	J. Walsh
LCB	4	J. Maher
RWB	5	Paddy Buggy
CB	6	M. Walsh
LWB	7	Johnny McGovern
M	8	M. Brophy
M	9	J. Sutton
RWF	10	D. Heaslip
CF	11	Mick Kenny
LWF	12	Mick Kelly (c)
RCF	13	R. Rockett
FF	14	W. Dwyer
LCF	15	Seán Clohessy
Substitutes:
9		B. Walsh

WATERFORD:
GK	1	Richie Roche
RCB	2	Tom Cunningham
FB	3	Austin Flynn
LCB	4	John Barron
RWB	5	Michael O'Connor
CB	6	Martin Óg Morrissey
LWB	7	Séamus Power
M	8	Johnny O'Connor
M	9	Philly Grimes (c)
RWF	10	Mick Flannelly
CF	11	Tom Cheasty
LWF	12	Larry Guinan
RCF	13	Frankie Walsh
FF	14	John Kiely
LCF	15	Dónal 'Duck' Whelan

MATCH RULES

- 60 minutes.
- Replay if scores level.
- Three named substitutes
