= 1964 Munster Senior Club Hurling Championship =

- Dates: 7 March 1965 - 10 April 1966
- Teams: 7
- Champions: Glen Rovers (1st title); Christy Ring (captain)
- Runners-up: Mount Sion

Tournament statistics
- Matches played: 6
- Goals scored: 40 (6.67 per match)
- Points scored: 84 (14 per match)
- Top scorer(s): Jimmy Doyle (5-08)

The 1964 Munster Senior Club Hurling Championship was the inaugural staging of the Munster Senior Club Hurling Championship since its establishment by the Munster Council. The championship, which was open to the champion clubs of 1964, began on 7 March 1965 and ended on 10 April 1966.

On 10 April 1966, Glen Rovers won the championship after a 3-07 to 1-07 defeat of Mount Sion in the final at the Gaelic Grounds. It was their first ever championship title.

Jimmy Doyle from the Thurles Sarsfields club was the championship's top scorer with 5-08.

== Results ==
=== First round ===
7 March 1965 First round	Mount Sion	2-09 - 2-05	Newmarket-on-Fergus	Walsh Park, Waterford
	F Walsh 1-2, S Power 1-0, J Glavin 0-2, B Mahon 0-2, P Grimes 0-2, L Guinan 0-1.		S Murphy 2-0, P McNamara 0-3, P Cronin 0-1, P Halpin 0-1.

7 March 1965 First round	Kilmoyley	1-04 - 7-07	Glen Rovers	Austin Stack Park, Tralee
	D Lovett 1-4.		B Carroll 3-2, P Harte 1-2, J Daly 1-1, D Moore 1-1, A Flynn 1-0, S Kennefick 0-1.

18 April 1965 First round	Thurles Sarsfields	9-15 - 4-05	Cappamore	Leahy Park, Cashel
	J Doyle 3-5, S McLoughin 2-2, T Wall 1-3, P Butler 1-2, P Dorney 1-1, B Dwyer 1-0, G Hogan 0-1.		J Hayes 2-0, D Flynn 1-1, MJ Hayes 1-1, M Hayes 0-3.

=== Semi-finals ===
16 June 1965 Semi-final	Mount Sion	4-09 - 5-05	Thurles Sarsfields	Ferrybank Sportsfield, Ferrybank
	P Grimes 2-3, F Walsh 1-3, S Power 1-0, F O'Brien 0-1, J Flavin 0-1, D Mahon 0-1.		J Doyle 2-3, P Butler 1-1, M Stapleton 1-0, P Dorney 1-0, B Dorney 0-1.	Referee: P Buggy (Kilkenny)

9 May 1965 Semi-final	Turloughmore	0-03 - 2-08	Glen Rovers	Pearse Stadium, Salthill
	F Coffey 0-3.		A Flynn 2-0, C Ring 0-2, D Moore 0-2, M Lane 0-1, P Harte 0-1, B Carroll 0-1, D O'Riordan 0-1.	Referee: M Hayes (Clare)

=== Finals ===
5 December 1965 Final	Glen Rovers	3-06 - 2-06 (abandoned)	Mount Sion	Leahy Park, Cashel
	P Harte 2-2, C Ring 1-1, J Salmon 0-1, T Corbett 0-1, A Flynn 0-1.		F Walsh 0-4, L Guinan 1-0, S Greene 1-0, M Óg Morrissey 0-1, T Walsh 0-1.	Referee: J Fitzgerald (Limerick)

10 April 1966 Final refixture	Glen Rovers	3-07 - 1-07	Mount Sion	Gaelic Grounds, Limerick
	T Corbett 0-5, C Ring 1-1, J Young 1-1, B Carroll 1-0.		F Walsh 0-4, S Greene 1-0, P O'Grady 0-1, P Grimes 0-1, D Mahon 0-1.	Referee: J Fitzgerald (Limerick)

== Championship statistics ==
=== Top scorers ===
Top scorer overall

Rank	Player	Club	Tally	Total	Matches	Average
1	Jimmy Doyle	Thurles Sarsfields	5-08	23	2	11.50
2	Bill Carroll	Glen Rovers	4-03	15	3	5.00
2	Frankie Walsh	Mount Sion	2-09	15	3	5.00
3	Phil Grimes	Mount Sion	2-06	12	3	4.00

Top scorers in a single game

Rank	Player	Club	Tally	Total	Opposition
1	Jimmy Doyle	Thurles Sarsfields	3-05	14	Cappamore
2	Bill Carroll	Glen Rovers	3-02	11	Kilmoyley
3	Jimmy Doyle	Thurles Sarsfields	2-03	9	Mount Sion
3	Phil Grimes	Mount Sion	2-03	9	Thurles Sarsfields
4	Seán McLoughlin	Thurles Sarsfields	2-02	8	Cappamore
5	Declan Lovett	Kilmoyley	1-04	7	Glen Rovers
