= 1963 Waterford Senior Hurling Championship =

Annual hurling competition season

- Champions: Mount Sion (18th title)
- Runners-up: Ballygunner

The 1963 Waterford Senior Hurling Championship was the 63rd staging of the Waterford Senior Hurling Championship since its establishment by the Waterford County Board in 1897.

Erin's Own were the defending champions.

The final was played on 15 December 1963 at Walsh Park in Waterford, between Mount Sion and first-time finalists Ballygunner. Mount Sion won the match by 4–06 to 3–04 to claim their 18th championship title overall and a first title in two years.

== Results ==
=== Final ===
15 December 1963 Final	Mount Sion	4-06 - 3-04	Ballygunner	Walsh Park
