= 1962 Waterford Senior Hurling Championship =

Annual hurling competition season

- Champions: Mount Sion (13th title)
- Runners-up: Erin's Own

The 1962 Waterford Senior Hurling Championship was the 62nd staging of the Waterford Senior Hurling Championship since its establishment by the Waterford County Board in 1897.

Mount Sion were the defending champions.

The final, a replay, was played on 25 November 1962 at Walsh Park in Waterford, between Mount Sion and Erin's Own, in what was their fourth consecutive meeting in the final. Erin's Own won the match by 5–07 to 1–14 to claim their 13th championship title overall and a first title in 15 years.

== Team changes ==
=== To Championship ===
Promoted from the Waterford Junior Hurling Championship

- Ballyduff Lower

== Results ==
=== Semi-finals ===
7 October 1962 Semi-final	Erin's Own	5-08 - 1-06	Abbeyside	Fraher Field

7 October 1962 Semi-final	Mount Sion	4-12 - 2-02	Ballyduff Lower	Páirc Uí Bhriain

=== Final ===
28 October 1962 Final	Erin's Own	3-06 - 3-06	Mount Sion	Walsh Park

=== Final replay ===
25 November 1962 Final replay	Erin's Own	5-07 - 1-14	Mount Sion	Walsh Park
