= 1943 Waterford Senior Hurling Championship =

Annual hurling competition season

- Champions: Mount Sion (4th title)
- Runners-up: Tallow

The 1943 Waterford Senior Hurling Championship was the 43rd staging of the Waterford Senior Hurling Championship since its establishment by the Waterford County Board in 1897.

Erin's Own were the defending champions.

On 19 September 1943, Mount Sion won the championship after a 3–08 to 1–05 defeat of Tallow in the final. This was their fourth championship title overall and their first title since 1940.
