= 1958–59 National Hurling League =

28th season of the National Hurling League

League details
- Dates: 26 October 1958 – 3 May 1959

League champions
- Winners: Tipperary (8th win)
- Captain: Tony Wall

League runners-up
- Runners-up: Waterford
- Captain: Frankie Walsh

The 1958–59 National Hurling League was the 28th season of the NHL, an annual hurling competition for the GAA county teams. Tipperary won the title.

== Division 1 ==
=== Division 1A ===
| Pos | Team | Pld | W | D | L | Pts | Notes |
|---|---|---|---|---|---|---|---|
| 1 | Waterford | 5 | 4 | 0 | 1 | 8 | National League runners-up |
| 2 | Cork | 5 | 2 | 2 | 1 | 6 | |
| 3 | Kilkenny | 5 | 2 | 2 | 1 | 6 | |
| 4 | Wexford | 5 | 3 | 0 | 2 | 6 | |
| 5 | Dublin | 5 | 1 | 2 | 2 | 4 | |
| 6 | Antrim | 5 | 0 | 0 | 5 | 0 | |

=== Group stage ===
| 26 October 1958 | Cork | 5-07 - 5-06 | Wexford | Cork Athletic Grounds, Cork |
| | C Ring 2-3, N O'Connell 2-0, P Barry 1-0, T Kelly 0-2, W Walsh 0-1, P Duggan 0-1. | | P McGrath 2-1, R Murphy 1-2, T Flood 1-1, J O'Brien 1-0, P Kehoe 0-2. | Referee: S Gleeson (Limerick) |

| 25 October 1958 | Dublin | 1-08 - 1-12 | Waterford | O'Toole Park, Dublin |
| | P Boyle 1-1, F Whelan 0-3, A Lynch 0-1, J O'Neill 0-1, A Young 0-1, L Roe 0-1. | | F Walsh 0-4, D Whelan 1-0, S Power 0-3, P Grimes 0-2, T Cheasty 0-1, S Flavin 0-1, T Cunningham 0-1. |

| 25 October 1958 | Kilkenny | 7-06 - 2-02 | Antrim | Nowlan Park, Kilkenny |
| | D Heaslip 2-2, O Walsh 2-0, B Dwyer 1-2, Cleere 1-0, J Carroll 1-0, P Kelly 0-1, M Fleming 0-1. | | P Moloney 1-0, E McMullen 1-0, S Murphy 0-2. |

| 9 November 1958 | Dublin | 3-06 - 3-06 | Kilkenny | O'Toole Park, Dublin |
| | A Lynch 2-1, D Foley 1-1, F Whelan 0-3, A Young 0-1. | | B Dwyer 2-1, D Heaslip 1-2, J Clohessy 0-1, S Clohessy 0-1, T O'Connell 0-1. | Referee: P Connell (Offaly) |

| 9 November 1958 | Waterford | 2-08 - 1-08 | Wexford | Waterford Sportsfield, Waterford |
| | F Walsh 1-5, L Guinan 1-0, T Cunningham 0-2, T Cheasty 0-1. | | T Flood 1-3, O McGrath 0-3, O Gough 0-1, S Hearne 0-1. |

| 23 November 1958 | Cork | 2-03 - 4-05 | Waterford | Cork Athletic Grounds, Cork |
| | T Kelly 1-0, N O'Connell 1-0, C Ring 0-1, W Walsh 0-1, E Goulding 0-1. | | L Guinan 3-0, D Whelan 1-0, F Walsh 0-1, T Cunningham 0-1, T Cheasty 0-1, S Power 0-1, P Grimes 0-1. |

| 23 November 1958 | Wexford | 7-05 - 6-04 | Kilkenny | Enniscorthy |
| | P Kehoe 3-2, J Reilly 2-1, T Flood 1-1, J O'Brien 1-0, J McGrath 0-1. | | T O'Connell 4-0, M Fleming 1-2, W Fitzgerald 1-1, M Kelly 0-1. |

| 23 November 1958 | Antrim | 2-03 - 5-07 | Dublin | Fr. Healy Park, Loughguile |
| | P Mullaney 1-1, E McIlveen 1-0, O Campbell 0-2. | | A Young 2-0, J O'Neill 1-2, A Lynch 1-0, F Whelan 1-0, H Doyle 0-3, P Boyle 0-1, L Shannon 0-1. |

| 8 February 1959 | Cork | 5-08 - 6-05 | Dublin | Cork Athletic Grounds, Cork |
| | P Barry 2-2, N O'Connell 2-1, C Ring 1-3, E Goulding 0-2. | | T Dowling 2-0, P Croke 1-1, F Whelan 1-1, J O'Neill 1-1, L Row 1-0, J Byrne 0-2. |

| 8 February 1959 | Waterford | 1-08 - 3-06 | Kilkenny | Waterford Sportsfield, Waterford |
| | D Whelan 1-0, P Grimes 0-2, F Walsh 0-2, L Guinan 0-1, S Power 0-1, M Lacey 0-1, M Flannelly 0-1. | | M Kelly 1-3, B Dwyer 1-1, P Kelly 1-1, D Heaslip 0-1. |

| 8 February 1959 | Wexford | 6-10 - 3-03 | Antrim | Enniscorthy |
| | J O'Reilly 2-1, O McGrath 2-1, P Kehoe 1-3, J Synnott 1-0, R Murphy 0-3, O Gough 0-1, S Hearne 0-1. | | O Campbell 2-0, P Mullaney 1-1, D Armstrong 0-1, R Donnelly 0-1. |

| 1 March 1958 | Antrim | 4-04 - 8-07 | Cork | Fr. Healy Park, Loughguile |
| | P Mullaney 2-0, D Armstrong 1-0, O Campbell 1-0, R Elliot 0-2, B Elliot 0-1, E McMullen 0-1. | | T Kelly 3-1, M Quane 2-0, W Carroll 1-3, E Goulding 1-0, P O'Leary 1-0, D Hurley 0-1, J Daly 0-1, M Thompson 0-1. |

| 5 April 1959 | Kilkenny | 5-08 - 6-05 | Cork | Nowlan Park, Kilkenny |
| | T O'Connell 2-0, D Carroll 1-2, M Fleming 1-1, B Dwyer 1-0, J McGovern 0-2, M Brophy 0-1, D Heaslip 0-1, W Fitzgerald 0-1. | | N O'Connell 3-0, C Cooney 2-1, M Quane 1-0, M Regan 0-1, P Barry 0-1, P Duggan 0-1, N Gallagher 0-1. |

| 5 April 1959 | Antrim | 0-05 - 2-13 | Waterford | Fr. Healy Park, Loughguile |
| | P Mullaney 0-2, S Gallagher 0-1, P Morgan 0-1. | | D Whelan 2-0, M Leahy 0-5, P Troy 0-3, P Grimes 0-2, L Guinan 0-2, D Dunphy 0-1. |

| 5 April 1959 | Dublin | 3-06 - 3-11 | Wexford | O'Toole Park, Dublin |
| | T Dowling 2-0, J Byrne 1-0, F Whelan 0-3, H Doyle 0-2, A Young 0-1. | | P McGrath 1-3, J Breen 1-3, T Flood 1-2, J O'Brien 0-2, S Hearne 0-1. |

=== Division 1B ===
| Pos | Team | Pld | W | D | L | Pts | Notes |
|---|---|---|---|---|---|---|---|
| 1 | Tipperary | 4 | 4 | 0 | 0 | 8 | National League winners |
| 2 | Galway | 4 | 3 | 0 | 1 | 6 | |
| 3 | Clare | 4 | 1 | 0 | 3 | 2 | |
| 4 | Limerick | 3 | 1 | 0 | 2 | 2 | |
| 5 | Kerry | 3 | 0 | 0 | 3 | 0 | |

=== Group stage ===
| 26 October 1958 | Kerry | 1-04 - 2-08 | Galway | Austin Stack Park, Tralee |
| | McCarthy 1-1, Healy 0-1, Higgins 0-1, T Hennessy 0-1. | | J Salmon 2-2, J Sweeney 0-3, PJ Lawless 0-2, Fox 0-1. |

| 26 October 1958 | Limerick | 4-09 - 2-07 | Clare | Gaelic Grounds, Limerick |
| | G Keane 2-0, L Moloney 1-2, L Hogan 1-1, D Moylan 0-2, V Cobbe 0-2, J Shanahan 0-1, T McGarry 0-1. | | F Cleary 1-1, G Ryan 1-0, J Smith 0-3, M Dilger 0-1, N Jordan 0-1, G Browne 0-1. |

| 9 November 1958 | Clare | 1-05 - 4-12 | Tipperary | Cusack Park, Ennis |
| | J Smyth 1-2, G Ryan 0-1, N Jordan 0-1, N Gilligan 0-1. | | D Nealon 2-4, L Connolly 2-1, L Devaney 0-4, J McDonnell 0-2, T Wall 0-1. | Referee: J Gallagher (Galway) |

| 9 November 1958 | Galway | 2-07 - 1-04 | Limerick | Duggan Park, Ballinasloe |
| | T Kelly 1-0, T Conway 1-0, PJ Lawless 0-3, J Salmon 0-2, J Fives 0-1, T Sweeney 0-1. | | L Moloney 1-0, V Cobbe 0-2, J Shanahan 0-1, D Kelly 0-1. |

| 23 November 1958 | Tipperary | 2-09 - 1-06 | Limerick | Leahy Park, Cashel |
| | L Connolly 2-0, D Nealon 0-4, L Devaney 0-3, J Murphy 0-2. | | V Cobbe 0-4, G Keane 1-0, J Shanahan 0-1, D Moylan 0-1. | Referee: M Walsh (Cork) |

| 23 November 1958 | Clare | 3-10 - 1-00 | Kerry | Fr. Murphy Memorial Park, Newmarket |
| | N Gilligan 2-1, J Smyth 1-2, N Jordan 0-3, S Cleary 0-2, G Ryan 0-2. | | T Hennessy 1-0. |

| 8 February 1959 | Tipperary | 3-08 - 2-05 | Galway | Thurles Sportsfield, Thurles |
| | M Maher 1-2, T Larkin 1-0, L Connolly 1-0, J Doyle 0-2, D Nealon 0-2, L Devaney 0-1, T Wall 0-1. | | T Sweeney 0-5, M Fox 1-0, J Salmon 1-0. |

| 5 April 1959 | Kerry | 1-03 - 10-16 | Tipperary | Austin Stack Park, Tralee |
| | J Healy 1-0, J White 0-1, M Wharton 0-1, JP Twomey 0-1. | | L Connolly 6-1, J Doyle 1-7, J McDonnell 1-5, T Burke 2-0, G Larkin 0-2, L Devaney 0-1. |

| 5 April 1959 | Galway | 3-04 - 3-01 | Clare | Gort Sportsfield, Gort |
| | M Cullinane 1-0, PJ Lally 1-0, PJ Lawless 1-0, T Sweeney 0-2, G Cahill 0-1, M Fox 0-1. | | P Henchy 2-0, N Gilligan 1-0, F Cleary 0-1. |

=== Final ===
| 3 May 1959 Final | Tipperary | 0-15 – 0-07 | Waterford | Nowlan Park, Kilkenny |
| | J Doyle 0-5, D Nealon 0-4, L Devaney 0-2, L Connolly 0-2, J McDonnell 0-1, T English 0-1. | | F Walsh 0-4, D Whelan 0-1, T Cheasty 0-1, M Lacey 0-1. | Referee: S Gleeson (Limerick) |

=== Top scorers ===
Top scorers overall

| Rank | Player | Club | Tally | Total |
|---|---|---|---|---|
| 1 | Liam Connolly | Tipperary | 11-04 | 37 |
| 2 | Noel O'Connell | Cork | 8-01 | 25 |
| 3 | Donie Nealon | Tipperary | 2-14 | 20 |
| 4 | Tommy O'Connell | Kilkenny | 6-01 | 19 |
| 4 | Billy Dwyer | Kilkenny | 5-04 | 19 |
| 4 | Tim Flood | Wexford | 4-07 | 19 |
| 4 | Padge Kehoe | Wexford | 4-07 | 19 |
| 4 | Frankie Walsh | Waterford | 1-16 | 19 |
| 5 | Jimmy Doyle | Tipperary | 1-14 | 17 |
| 6 | Donal Whelan | Waterford | 5-01 | 16 |
| 6 | P. Mullally | Antrim | 4-04 | 16 |
| 6 | Christy Ring | Cork | 3-07 | 16 |
| 6 | Fran Whelan | Dublin | 2-10 | 16 |

Top scorers in a single game

| Rank | Player | Club | Tally | Total | Opposition |
|---|---|---|---|---|---|
| 1 | Liam Connolly | Tipperary | 6-01 | 19 | Kerry |
| 2 | Tommy O'Connell | Kilkenny | 4-00 | 12 | Wexford |
| 3 | Padge Kehoe | Wexford | 3-02 | 11 | Kilkenny |
| 4 | Terry Kelly | Cork | 3-01 | 10 | Antrim |
| 4 | Donie Nealon | Tipperary | 2-04 | 10 | Clare |
| 4 | Jimmy Doyle | Tipperary | 1-07 | 10 | Kerry |
| 5 | Larry Guinan | Waterford | 3-00 | 9 | Cork |
| 5 | Noel O'Connell | Cork | 3-00 | 9 | Kilkenny |
| 5 | Christy Ring | Cork | 2-03 | 9 | Wexford |
| 6 | Denis Heaslip | Kilkenny | 2-02 | 8 | Antrim |
| 6 | Paddy Barry | Cork | 2-02 | 8 | Dublin |
| 6 | Joe Salmon | Galway | 2-02 | 8 | Kerry |
| 6 | Frankie Walsh | Waterford | 1-05 | 8 | Wexford |
| 6 | Jim McDonnell | Tipperary | 1-05 | 8 | Kerry |

== Division 2 ==
National Hurling League Division 2
- Season: 1958-59
- Champions: Carlow; 2nd Division 2 title
- All statistics correct as of 4 May 2017.

=== Group 2A table ===
| Pos | Team | Pld | W | D | L | Pts | Notes |
|---|---|---|---|---|---|---|---|
| 1 | Laois | 3 | 3 | 0 | 0 | 6 | Division 2 runners-up |
| 2 | Westmeath | 3 | 2 | 0 | 1 | 4 | |
| 3 | Offaly | 3 | 1 | 0 | 2 | 2 | |
| 4 | Meath | 3 | 0 | 0 | 3 | 0 | |

=== Group 2B table ===
| Pos | Team | Pld | W | D | L | Pts | Notes |
|---|---|---|---|---|---|---|---|
| 1 | Carlow | 3 | 3 | 0 | 0 | 6 | Division 2 champions |
| 2 | Kildare | 3 | 2 | 0 | 1 | 4 | |
| 3 | Roscommon | 3 | 1 | 0 | 2 | 2 | |
| 4 | Wicklow | 3 | 0 | 0 | 3 | 0 | |

=== Knock-out stage ===
Final

| Final | Carlow | 2-11 - 5-1 | Laois |
