= Ned Power =

Waterford hurling goalkeeper

Personal information
- Native name: Éamonn de Paor (Irish)
- Born: 20 November 1929 Dungarvan, County Waterford, Ireland
- Died: 15 November 2007 (aged 77) Tallow, County Waterford, Ireland
- Occupation: National school principal

Sport
- Sport: Hurling
- Position: Goalkeeper
Clubs
- Years: Club
- Dungarvan; Tallow
Club titles
- Waterford titles: 0
Inter-county
- Years: County
- 1957–1966: Waterford
Inter-county titles
- Munster titles: 3
- All-Irelands: 1
- NHL: 1

Edmond "Ned" Power (20 November 1929 – 15 November 2007) was an Irish hurler who played as a goalkeeper at senior level for the Waterford county team.

Born in Dungarvan, County Waterford, Power first arrived on the inter-county scene as a dual player in the minor grade with Waterford. He made his senior debut in the 1957 championship. Power went on to play a key part for Waterford in what has come to be known as a defining era for the county, and won one All-Ireland medal, three Munster medals and one National Hurling League medal.

Power represented the Munster interprovincial team on a number of occasions in the latter part of his career, winning one Railway Cup medal in 1966. At club level he won one junior championship medal with Tallow, having begun his career with Dungarvan.

Following Waterford's exit from the 1966 championship, Power retired from inter-county hurling.

Cited by many of his hurling peers as one of the greatest goalkeepers of his generation, Power subsequently became a coach. He coached Tallow teams at every level from juvenile ranks up and was also involved in a similar capacity with Waterford teams.

Playing career

== Club ==
Power played his club hurling with his local club Dungarvan and latterly Tallow where the local club grounds are now named in his honour — Páirc Éamonn de Paor.

== Inter-county ==
After an unsuccessful dual minor career, Power's senior hurling career began in 1957 as Waterford made a long-awaited breakthrough in the championship. A 1–11 to 1–6 defeat of reigning provincial champions Cork gave Power his first Munster medal. The subsequent All-Ireland decider saw Kilkenny provide the opposition; however, Power was replaced by Dick Roche for the 4–10 to 3–12 defeat.

After surrendering their provincial title the following year, Waterford recovered in 1959 with Power restored as first-choice goalkeeper. A 3–9 to 2–9 victory over Cork gave Power a second Munster medal. Once again, Waterford subsequently lined out in the championship decider, with Kilkenny providing the opposition once again. The game was another exciting affair and with ninety seconds left in the game Kilkenny were ahead by three points. Just then Séamus Power scored the equalising goal to force a remarkable 1–17 to 5–5 draw. The replay was another great game with both sides giving it their all. Waterford scored three goals in the opening thirty minutes, with Tom Cheasty finding the net twice, to help his side to a 3–12 to 1–10 win. The victory gave Power an All-Ireland medal.

Power added an Oireachtas medal to his collection in 1962 following a 4–12 to 3–9 victory over Tipperary.

In 1963 Power won a National Hurling League medal following a 3–10 to 1–10 defeat of New York in a replay of the final. He subsequently won a third Munster medal following an 0–11 to 0–8 victory over three-in-a-row hopefuls Tipperary. For the third successive time, Kilkenny turned out to be Waterford's opponents in the subsequent All-Ireland final. Things weren't going well for Power's side, and at one stage Waterford were eleven points in arrears. The men from the Déise pulled back this deficit to two points, but an expert display of free-taking by Eddie Keher proved the difference as Kilkenny won by 4–17 to 6–8.

Power retired from inter-county hurling in 1966.

== Post-playing career ==
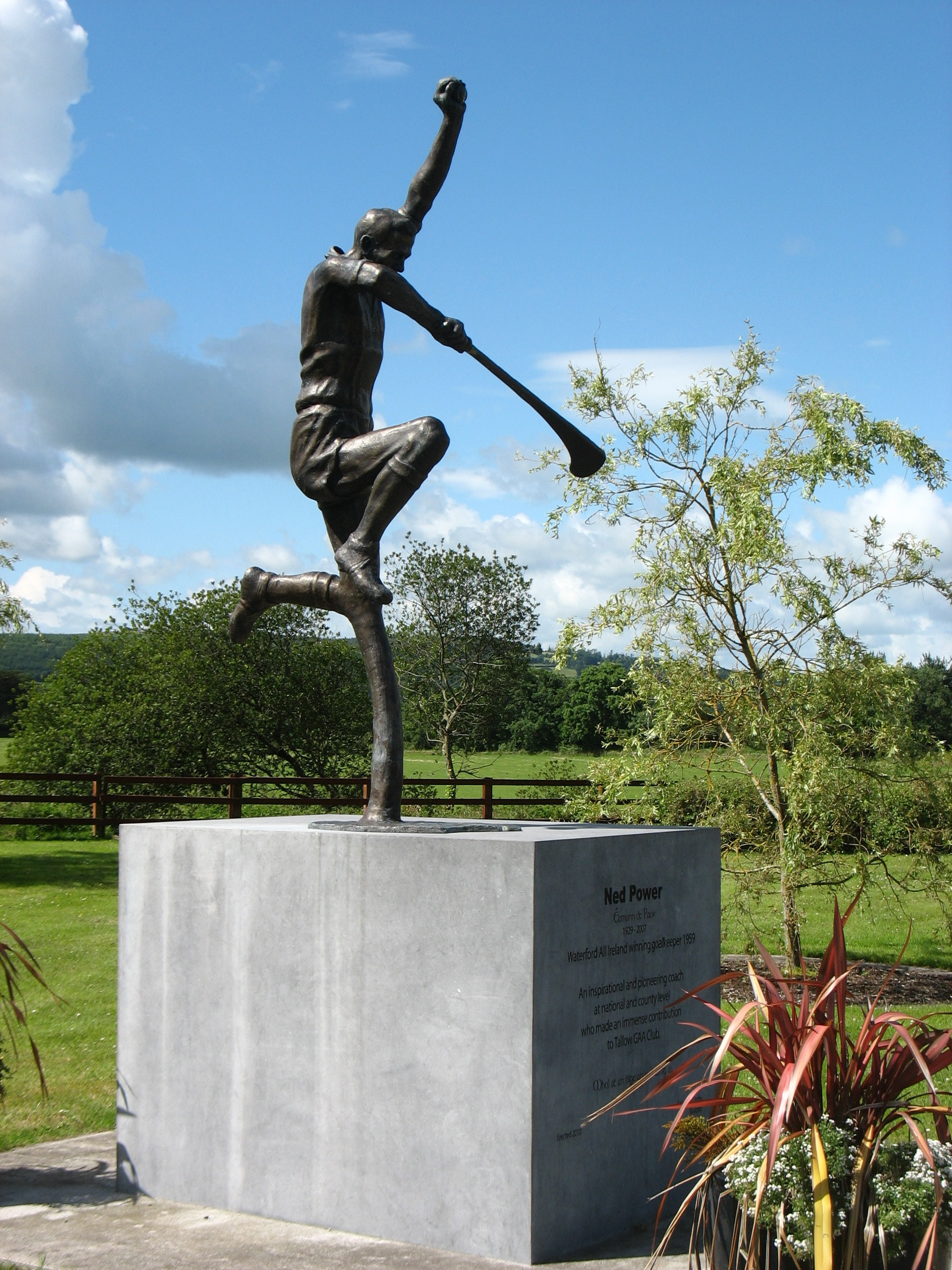
Statue of Ned Power at Tallowbridge

In retirement from hurling, Power maintained a keen interest in coaching. A teacher by profession in Scoil Mhuire in Tallow, his coaching methods with Tallow GAA saw the club win almost every available county title between 1966 and 1980.

Ned Power died on 15 November 2007 after a long illness.

His son, journalist Conor Power, authored a book on Ned Power's life, My Father: A Hurling Revolutionary, which was published in November 2009. A statue of Ned Power is located at Tallowbridge.
