= 1965 Waterford Senior Hurling Championship =

Annual hurling competition season

- Champions: Mount Sion (20th title)
- Runners-up: Ballygunner

The 1965 Waterford Senior Hurling Championship was the 65th staging of the Waterford Senior Hurling Championship since its establishment by the Waterford County Board in 1897.

Mount Sion were the defending champions.

The final was played on 31 October 1965 at McGrath Park in Tramore, between Mount Sion and Ballygunner, in what was their second meeting in the final overall. Mount Sion won the match by 3–02 to 2–04 to claim their 20th championship title overall and a third consecutive title.

== Results ==
=== Final ===
31 October 1965 Final	Mount Sion	3-02 - 2-04	Ballygunner	McGrath Park
	D Mahon 1-0, S Power 1-0 S Greene 1-0, P Grimes 0-2.		V Connors 1-1, J Warren 1-0, J Hearne 0-2, T Cummins 0-1.
