= 1961 Waterford Senior Hurling Championship =

Annual hurling competition season

- Dates: 14 May – 29 October 1961
- Teams: 14
- Champions: Mount Sion (17th title); Martin Óg Morrissey (captain)
- Runners-up: Erin's Own; Joe Condon (captain)

The 1961 Waterford Senior Hurling Championship was the 61st staging of the Waterford Senior Hurling Championship since its establishment by the Waterford County Board in 1897. The championship ran from 14 May to 29 October 1961.

Mount Sion were the defending champions.

The final, a replay, was played on 29 October 1961 at Walsh Park in Waterford, between Mount Sion and Erin's Own, in what was their third consecutive meeting in the final. Mount Sion won the match by 2–14 to 2–04 to claim their 17th championship title overall and a ninth consecutive title.

== Team changes ==
=== To Championship ===
Promoted from the Waterford Junior Hurling Championship

- Colligan Rockies

== Results ==
=== Semi-finals ===
27 August 1961 Semi-final	Erin's Own	4-07 - 2-08	Brickey Rangers	Fraher Field

10 September 1961 Semi-final	Mount Sion	6-08 - 3-07	Abbeyside	Fraher Field

=== Final ===
8 October 1961 Final	Mount Sion	0-11 - 2-05	Erin's Own	Walsh Park

=== Final replay ===
29 October 1961 Final replay	Mount Sion	2-14 - 2-04	Erin's Own	Walsh Park
