= 1941 Waterford Senior Hurling Championship =

Annual hurling competition season

- Champions: Dungarvan (6th title)
- Runners-up: Mount Sion

The 1941 Waterford Senior Hurling Championship was the 41st staging of the Waterford Senior Hurling Championship since its establishment by the Waterford County Board in 1897.

Mount Sion were the defending champions.

Dungarvan won the championship after a 2–06 to 1–05 defeat of Mount Sion in the final. This was their sixth championship title overall and their first title since 1926. It remains their last championship victory.
