= 1939 Waterford Senior Hurling Championship =

Annual hurling competition season

- Champions: Mount Sion (2nd title)
- Runners-up: Erin's Own

The 1939 Waterford Senior Hurling Championship was the 39th staging of the Waterford Senior Hurling Championship since its establishment by the Waterford County Board in 1897.

Mount Sion were the defending champions.

On 17 September 1939, Mount Sion won the championship after a 2–04 to 2–02 defeat of Erin's Own in the final. This was their second ever championship title and their second title in succession.
