= 1928 Waterford Senior Hurling Championship =

Annual hurling competition season

- Champions: Erin's Own (2nd title)
- Runners-up: Tallow

The 1928 Waterford Senior Hurling Championship was the 28th edition of the Waterford Senior Hurling Championship since its establishment by the Waterford County Board in 1897.

Erin's Own were the defending champions.

Erin's Own won the championship after a 5–06 to 2–00 defeat of Tallow in the final. This was their second championship title overall and their second title in succession.
