= 1946 Waterford Senior Hurling Championship =

Annual hurling competition season

- Champions: Erin's Own (11th title)
- Runners-up: Brickey Rangers

The 1946 Waterford Senior Hurling Championship was the 46th staging of the Waterford Senior Hurling Championship since its establishment by the Waterford County Board in 1897.

Mount Sion were the defending champions.

Erin's Own won the championship after a 5–07 to 2–04 defeat of Brickey Rangers in the final. This was their 11th championship title overall and their first title since 1942.
