= Martin Morrissey =

Martin Morrissey may refer to:

- Marty Morrissey (born 1958), Irish sports commentator and television presenter
- Martin Óg Morrissey (born 1934), Irish former sportsperson
