= 1938 Waterford Senior Hurling Championship =

Annual hurling competition season

- Champions: Mount Sion (1st title)
- Runners-up: Erin's Own

The 1938 Waterford Senior Hurling Championship was the 38th staging of the Waterford Senior Hurling Championship since its establishment by the Waterford County Board in 1897.

Portlaw were the defending champions.

On 8 January 1939, Mount Sion won the championship after a 4–03 to 3–04 defeat of Erin's Own in the final. This was their first ever championship title.
