= Eoin McGrath =

Irish hurler (born 1980)

Personal information
- Native name: Eoin Mac Craith (Irish)
- Nicknames: Mac, Spanky
- Born: 2 November 1980 (age 45) Waterford, Ireland
- Height: 5 ft 9 in (175 cm)

Sport
- Sport: Hurling
- Position: Left corner-forward
Club
- Years: Club
- 1998–present: Mount Sion
Club titles
- Waterford titles: 6
- Munster titles: 1
Inter-county*
Years	County	Apps (scores)
2001–2012	Waterford	43 (2–34)
Inter-county titles
- Munster titles: 4
- All-Irelands: 0
- NHL: 1
- All Stars: 0
- *Inter County team apps and scores correct as of 11:45, 4 August 2012.

Eoin McGrath (born 2 November 1980) is an Irish hurler who played as a left corner-forward for the Waterford senior team. He joined the team in 2002 and was a regular member of the starting fifteen until his retirement in 2012.

Son of former hurler Pat and younger brother of current selector Ken, McGrath was a stalwart on the Waterford team for a decade. He has won four Munster winners' medals and one National League winners' medal. He ended up as an All-Ireland runner-up on one occasion.

At club level McGrath is a Munster medalist with Mount Sion. In addition to this, he has also won six county club championship medals.

== Playing career ==
=== Club ===
McGrath played his club hurling with the Mount Sion club in Waterford, enjoying success there.

In 1998 McGrath was still a minor when he won his first county club championship medal following a 3–19 to 0–10 trouncing of Ballyduff Upper.

After surrendering their title to Ballygunner in 1999, Mount Sion were back the following year to exact revenge. A 1–20 to 0–9 defeat of Ballygunner gave McGrath a second county championship medal.

Mount Sion surrendered their club title in 2001, however, McGrath's side were back in the final again in 2002. A 1–19 to 2–14 defeat of Ballygunner secured the championship once again. It was the first of three county final victories in-a-row over Ballygunner.

In 2002 McGrath won a Munster club medal as Mount Sion defeated Sixmilebridge to take the title. The club was defeated in the subsequent All-Ireland semi-final.

Four club titles in-a-row proved beyond Mount Sion, however, the club bounced back in 2006 with McGrath winning a sixth county championship medal following a seven-point defeat of Ballygunner.

=== Inter-county ===
McGrath joined the Waterford senior team during the 2001 National Hurling when he came on as a substitute against Tipperary, however, he played no part in the subsequent championship.

The following year McGrath made his championship debut in a Munster semi-final victory over Cork. He later claimed his first Munster winners' medal as Waterford defeated Tipperary by 2–23 to 3–12 to claim the provincial crown for the first time in thirty-nine years.

After surrendering the Munster title to Cork in 2003, McGrath's side were back in the provincial showpiece for a third successive year in 2004. Waterford defeated Cork in a Munster final for the first time in forty-five years to take the title by 3–16 to 1–21.

In 2007 McGrath added a National Hurling League medal to his collection when Waterford defeated Kilkenny by 0–20 to 0–18 in the final. He later claimed a third Munster winners' medal as Waterford defeated Limerick by 3–17 to 1–14 in the provincial decider. While Waterford were viewed as possibly going on and winning the All-Ireland title for the first time in almost half a century, Limerick ambushed McGrath's side in the All-Ireland semi-final.

2008 began poorly for Waterford as the team lost their opening game to Clare as well as their manager Justin McCarthy. In spite of this poor start McGrath's side reached the All-Ireland final for the first time in forty-five years. Kilkenny provided the opposition and went on to defeat Waterford by 3–30 to 1–13 to claim a third All-Ireland title in-a-row.

McGrath lined out in a sixth Munster final in 2010 with Cork providing the opposition. A 2–15 apiece draw was the result on that occasion, however, Waterford went on to win the replay after an extra-time goal by Dan Shanahan. It was a fourth Munster winners' medal for McGrath, a record that he shares with five other Waterford players.

In 2011 and 2012 McGrath was in the twilight of his career, making fewer and fewer league and championship appearances. He retired after Waterford were defeated by Cork in the All-Ireland quarter-final in 2012. Ironically, he had made his championship debut against the same opposition a decade earlier.

=== Inter-provincial ===
McGrath also lined out with Munster in the inter-provincial series of games. He played with the provincial selection for one year in 2002, however, Munster were defeated by Leinster in the final.

== Honours ==
=== Team ===
Mount Sion

- Munster Senior Club Hurling Championship (1): 2002
- Waterford Senior Club Hurling Championship (6): 1998, 2000, 2002, 2003, 2004, 2006

Waterford

- Munster Senior Hurling Championship (4): 2002, 2004, 2007, 2010
- National Hurling League (1): 2007
