= 1964 Waterford Senior Hurling Championship =

Annual hurling competition season

- Champions: Mount Sion (19th title); Mick Flannelly (captain)
- Runners-up: Abbeyside; Austin Flynn (captain)

The 1964 Waterford Senior Hurling Championship was the 64th staging of the Waterford Senior Hurling Championship since its establishment by the Waterford County Board in 1897.

Mount Sion were the defending champions.

The final was played on 11 October 1964 at Fraher Field in Dungarvan, between Mount Sion and Abbeyside, in what was their third meeting in the final overall. Mount Sion won the match by 3–06 to 1–06 to claim their 19th championship title overall and a second consecutive title.

== Results ==
=== Final ===
11 October 1964 Final	Mount Sion	3-06 - 1-06	Abbeyside	Fraher Field
