= Fred O'Brien (hurler) =

Irish retired hurler

Personal information
- Native name: Feardorcha Ó Briain (Irish)
- Born: 1938 (age 87–88) Waterford, Ireland
- Occupation: Mental nurse
- Height: 5 ft 10 in (178 cm)

Sport
- Sport: Hurling
Club
- Years: Club
- Mount Sion
Inter-county
- Years: County
- Waterford
Inter-county titles
- Munster titles: 1
- All-Irelands: 1
- NHL: 0

Fred O'Brien (born 1938) is an Irish retired hurler who played for club side Mount Sion and at inter-county level with the Waterford senior hurling team.

== Honours ==
Waterford

- All-Ireland Senior Hurling Championship (1): 1959
- Munster Senior Hurling Championship (1): 1959
