= 1927 Waterford Senior Hurling Championship =

Annual hurling competition season

- Champions: Erin's Own (1st title)
- Runners-up: Dungarvan

The 1927 Waterford Senior Hurling Championship was the 27th staging of the Waterford Senior Hurling Championship since its establishment by the Waterford County Board in 1897.

Dungarvan were the defending champions.

Erin's Own won the championship after an 8–02 to 0–05 defeat of Dungarvan in the final. This was their first ever championship title.
