= 1962–63 National Hurling League =

32nd season of the National Hurling League

League details
- Dates: 11 November 1962 – 3 November 1963

League champions
- Winners: Waterford (1st win)
- Captain: John Meaney

League runners-up
- Runners-up: New York
- Captain: J. Carey

The 1962–63 National Hurling League was the 32nd season of the NHL, an annual hurling competition for the GAA county teams. Waterford won their second title.

== Division 1 ==
National Hurling League Division 1
- Season: 1962-63
- Champions: Waterford; 1st National League title Captain: John Meaney
- Matches played: 29
- Top goalscorer: Phil Grimes (6-31)
- Biggest away win: Tipperary 10-10 - 2-04 Offaly (4 November 1962)
- All statistics correct as of 2 September 2018.

Tipperary came into the season as defending champions of the 1961-62 season.

On 3 November 1963, Waterford won the title after a 3-10 to 1-10 win over New York in the final replay. It was their first league title.

Waterford's Phil Grimes was the Division 1 top scorer with 6-31.

=== Division 1A table ===
Pos	Team	Pld	W	D	L	Pts	Notes
1	Waterford	4	3	0	1	6	National League champions
2	Wexford	4	3	0	1	6	
3	Cork	4	1	0	3	2	
4	Limerick	3	1	0	2	2	
5	Carlow	3	1	0	2	2	

=== Group stage ===
14 October 1962	Wexford	4-04 - 1-05	Limerick	St. Patrick's Park, Enniscorthy
	O McGrath 2-1, D Murphy 2-1, M Lyng 0-1, N Wheeler 0-1.		M Rainsford 1-0, P Hartnett 0-2, B Hartigan 0-1, T McGarry 0-1, E Carey 0-1.	Referee: A Murphy (Tipperary)

21 October 1962	Carlow	1-17 - 1-12	Cork	Dr. Cullen Park, Carlow
	W Hogan 1-5, L Walsh 0-6, M Morrissey 0-3, N Gladney 0-1, P McGovern 0-1, M O'Brien 0-1.		C Ring 0-7, W Carroll 1-0, P Harte 0-3, J Daly 0-1, D Murphy 0-1.

28 October 1962	Cork	5-11 - 3-06	Limerick	Cork Athletic Grounds, Cork
	C Ring 2-4, W Carroll 2-0, P Harte 1-2, P Fitzgerald 0-3, John Barry 0-1, D Moore 0-1.		P Hartnett 0-4, P Murphy 1-0, PJ Keane 1-0, P Treacy 1-0, T McGarry 0-2.	Referee: T English (Tipperary)

11 November 1962	Limerick	7-06 - 3-03	Waterford	Gaelic Grounds, Limerick
	T Bluett 2-2, B Hartigan 2-2, P Murphy 2-1, P Hartnett 1-1.		John Barron 1-0, M Flannelly 1-0, P Grimes 1-0, F Walsh 0-1, M Dempsey 0-1, T Cheasty 0-1.	Referee: P Cronin (Cork)

11 November 1962	Wexford	5-13 - 7-04	Cork	St. Patrick's Park, Enniscorthy
	O McGrath 3-0, M Bergin 1-1, N Wheeler 1-0, P Lynch 0-3, J O'Brien 0-3, M Lyng 0-3, R Murphy 0-1.		C Ring 2-2, P Harte 1-1, P Fitzgerald 1-1, T Kelly 1-0, W Carroll 1-0, J Daly 1-0.	Referee: J Hatton (Wicklow)

18 November 1962	Waterford	3-14 - 4-04	Carlow	Walsh Park, Waterford
	T Cheasty 1-3, M Flannelly 0-4, P Grimes 0-4, F Walsh 1-0, J Barron 1-0, S Power 0-2, Joe Condon 0-1.		W Hogan 4-1, W Walsh (Fair) 0-2, W Walsh (Dark) 0-1.	Referee: P Johnston (Kilkenny)

10 March 1963	Wexford	5-13 - 3-06	Carlow	St. Patrick's Park, Enniscorthy
	O McGrath 3-6, N Wheeler 2-0, J O'Brien 0-4, J Kennedy 0-1, M Bergin 0-1, W Rackard 0-1.		W Hogan 2-2, W Walsh (Fair) 1-1, P O'Connell 0-2, W Walsh (Dark) 0-1.	Referee: T Ryall (Kilkenny)

10 March 1963	Cork	4-08 - 5-09	Waterford	Cork Athletic Grounds, Cork
	C Ring 2-2, J O'Halloran 1-1, D Sheehan 1-0, P Harte 0-2, W Carroll 0-1, T Corbett 0-1, P Fitzgerald 0-1.		F Walsh 1-3, P Grimes 1-3, T Cheasty 1-1, C Ware 1-1, J Barron 1-0, J Condon 0-1.	Referee: S Gleeson (Limerick)

24 March 1963	Waterford	3-09 - 3-06	Wexford	Walsh Park, Waterford
	P Grimes 1-4, J Barron 2-0, M Flannelly 0-3, J Condon 0-1, S Power 0-1.		O McGrath 1-1, J Kennedy 1-0, N Wheeler 1-0, R Murphy 0-3, J O'Brien 0-1, M Lyng 0-1.	Referee: P Johnston (Kilkenny)

Play-off

31 March 1963	Waterford	2-07 - 1-07	Wexford	Nowlan Park, Kilkenny
	S Power 2-0, P Grimes 0-6, F Walsh 0-1.		H O'Connor 1-1, O McGrath 0-2, S Lambert 0-1, J O'Brien 0-1, N Wheeler 0-1, J English 0-1.	Referee: G Fitzgerald (Limerick)

=== Division 1B table ===
Pos	Team	Pld	W	D	L	Pts	Notes
1	Tipperary	3	3	0	0	6	
2	Kilkenny	4	3	0	1	6	
3	Clare	4	2	0	2	4	
4	Offaly	4	1	0	3	2	
5	Laois	3	0	0	3	0	

=== Group stage ===
14 October 1962	Kilkenny	4-14 - 3-06	Clare	Nowlan Park, Kilkenny
	E Keher 1-6, D Heaslip 1-2, W Murphy 0-4, N Power 1-0, P Forrestal 1-0, O Gough 0-2.		P Cronin 1-2, J Smyth 1-1, M Shea 1-1, M Slattery 0-1, P McNamara 0-1.	Referee: R Roche (Waterford)

28 October 1962	Clare	8-12 - 2-07	Offaly	Cusack Park, Ennis
	J Smyth 3-4, P McNamara 3-2, P Cronin 1-2, N Jordan 1-0, M Slattery 0-2, J Cullinan 0-1, M Danagher 0-1.		S McGee 1-0, A Gallagher 1-0, P Molloy 0-2, E Fox 0-2, D Loughnan 0-2, M Doorley 0-1.

28 October 1962	Laois	1-05 - 4-11	Kilkenny	O'Moore Park, Portlaoise
	M McDonnell 1-1, J Fitzpatrick 0-1, J Lyons 0-1, P Keenan 0-1, M Dalton 0-1.		E Keher 1-5, P Forrestal 1-1, D Heaslip 1-1, T Walsh 1-1, O Gough 0-1, S Clohessey 0-1, M Coogan 0-1.	Referee: P Connell (Offaly)

4 November 1962	Offaly	10-10 - 2-04	Tipperary	St. Brendan's Park, Birr
	L Connolly 3-1, S McLoughlin 3-0, J Doyle 1-6, T Ryan 2-2, T Moloughney 1-0, P Delaney 0-1.		M Doorley 1-1, T Dooley 1-0, M Spain 0-2, P Molloy 0-1.

11 November 1962	Tipperary	6-08 - 4-06	Clare	Seán Treacy Park, Tipperary
	M McKenna 3-2, T Ryan 1-1, J Doyle 1-1, T Moloughney 1-0, D Nealon 0-2, L Connolly 0-1, T English 0-1.		J Smyth 1-3, P Cronin 1-1, L Danagher 1-0, M Keane 1-0, M Slattery 0-2.	Referee: P Johnston (Kilkenny)

11 November 1962	Offaly	4-05 - 3-06	Laois	St. Brendan's Park, Birr
	P Molloy 1-0, B Loughnane 1-0, T Dooley 1-0, E Scully 1-0, C Loughnane 0-2, M Spain 0-1, V Loughnane 0-1, M Greene 0-1.		J Lyons 2-0, P Bates 1-1, M McDonnell 0-2, P Dillon 0-2, P Keenan 0-1.

10 February 1963	Kilkenny	3-11 - 0-02	Offaly	Nowlan Park, Kilkenny
	T Walsh 2-1, O Gough 0-6, S CLohessy 1-0, E Keher 0-3, W Murphy 0-1.		B Loughnane 0-1, Coleman 0-1.

10 March 1963	Clare	9-05 - 3-10	Laois	Cusack Park, Ennis
	J Smyth 3-1, N Jordan 2-1, P McNamara 2-0, J Donoghue 1-1, M O'Shea 1-0, M Deasy 0-1, G Cronin 0-1.		C O'Brien 1-3, O Fennell 0-5, P Keenan 1-0, G Conroy 1-0, P Bates 0-1, J Conroy 0-1.

21 April 1963	Tipperary	2-12 - 2-09	Kilkenny	Thurles Sportsfield, Thurles
	J Doyle 0-8, S McLoughlin 1-0, J McKenna 1-0, L Devaney 0-2, T English 0-1, D Nealon 0-1.		E Keher 2-3, O Gough 0-4, S Clohessy 0-1, T Walsh 0-1.	Referee: G Fitzgerald (Limerick)

=== Division 1C table ===
Pos	Team	Pld	W	D	L	Pts	Notes
1	Galway	3	3	0	0	6	
2	Dublin	3	2	0	1	4	
3	Westmeath	3	1	0	2	2	
4	Antrim	3	0	0	3	0	

=== Group stage ===
14 October 1962	Westmeath	2-07 - 8-08	Dublin	Cusack Park, Mullingar
	P Loughlin 1-2, W Weldon 1-0, T Ring 0-3, P McCabe 0-1, J Rooney 0-1.		M Bermingham 2-1, M Kennedy 2-0, J Shields 1-2, A Hughes 1-1, F Whelan 1-1, W Jackson 1-0, L Shannon 0-2, A Boothman 0-1.	Referee: PF Everett (Meath)

14 October 1962	Antrim	1-05 - 4-09	Galway	Casement Park, Belfast
	J McCloskey 0-4, O Campbell 1-0, B McGurk 0-1.		M Cullinane 2-4, M Curtin 1-2, PJ Qualter 1-1, S Gohery 0-2.

10 February 1963	Galway	4-04 - 3-04	Westmeath	Duggan Park, Ballinasloe
	S Gohery 3-1, M Curtin 1-1, M Cullinan 0-1, J Conroy 0-1.		S Kirby 2-1, J Rooney 1-1, J Carey 0-1, J McKay 0-1.	Referee: V Daly (Offaly)

3 March 1963	Dublin	8-13 - 5-01	Antrim	Croke Park, Dublin
	W Jackson 3-0, T McEntaggart 2-2, F Whelan 1-5, B Cooney 1-0, J Shiels 1-0, A Boothman 0-3, C Hayes 0-2, B Byrne 0-1.		D Elliott 2-1, A Daly 1-0, A McCampbell 1-0, O Campbell 0-1.	Referee: B Smith (Meath)

10 March 1963	Galway	1-10 - 2-04	Dublin	Pearse Stadium, Salthill
	T Sweeney 0-6, J Murray 1-0, J Salmon 0-2, J Conroy 0-1, M Cullinane 0-1.		L Shannon 1-0, T McEntaggart 1-0, D Foley 0-2, A Boothman 0-1, M Bohan 0-1.	Referee: J Dowling (Offaly)

10 March 1963	Westmeath	4-08 - 4-04	Antrim	Cusack Park, Mullingar
	P Loughlin 1-2, J Kiernan 1-1, J Rooney 1-0, D Kiernan 1-0, J Carey 0-2, S Kirby 0-2, D Nolan 0-1.		B McGarvey 3-0, L McGarry 1-0, B McGurk 0-2, O Campbell 0-1, A McCampbell 0-1.

=== Knock-out stage ===
Semi-final

7 April 1963 Semi-final	Waterford	0-09 - 0-07	Galway	Croke Park, Dublin
	T Cheasty (0-3), Grimes (0-3, two frees), F Walsh (0-2), Barron (0-1).		J Connor (0-2, one from a '70'), M Curtin (0-2), Sweeney (0-1), M Regan (0-1), M Cullinane (0-1).	Referee: J Hatton (Wicklow)

Home final

5 May 1963 Home final	Waterford	2-15 - 4-07	Tipperary	Croke Park, Dublin
	P Grimes (1-9), M Flannelly (1-0), F Walsh (0-3), S Power (0-1), T Cheasty (0-1), (K Carey of Tipperary scored an own point).		S McLoughlin (2-1), Jimmy Doyle (1-2), M Burns (1-1, free and '70'), L Devaney (0-2), T Ryan (0-1).	Referee: G Fitzgerald (Limerick)

Finals

27 October 1963 Final	Waterford	3-06 - 3-06	New York	Croke Park, Dublin
	P Grimes 2-3, J Kirwan 1-0, S Power 0-1, J Meaney 0-1, M Flannelly 0-1.		P Kirby 2-1, B Kelleher 1-1, S Ryall 0-2, J Keating 0-1, B Hennessy 0-1.	Referee: P Fleming (New York)

3 November 1963 Final replay	Waterford	3-10 - 1-10	New York	Nowlan Park, Kilkenny
	J Kirwan 1-2, S Power 1-0, J O'Byrne 1-0, J Meaney 0-3, P Grimes 0-2, M Flannelly 0-1, J Barron 0-1, F Walsh 0-1.		P Kirby 1-3, S Ryall 0-4, W Carey 0-2, M O'Donovan 0-1.	Referee: P Fleming (New York)

=== Top scorers ===
Top scorers overall

Rank	Player	Club	Tally	Total	Matches	Average
1	Phil Grimes	Waterford	6-31	49	8	6.12
2	Oliver McGrath	Wexford	9-10	37	5	7.40
3	Jimmy Smyth	Clare	8-09	33	4	8.25
3	Christy Ring	Cork	6-15	33	4	8.25
4	Willie Hogan	Carlow	7-08	29	3	9.66
4	Eddie Keher	Kilkenny	4-17	29	4	7.25
5	Jimmy Doyle	Tipperary	3-17	26	4	6.50
6	Seán McLoughlin	Tipperary	6-01	19	3	6.33
7	Pat McNamara	Clare	5-03	18	3	6.00
8	John Barron	Waterford	5-02	17	9	1.88
8	Frankie Walsh	Waterford	2-11	17	9	1.88

Top scorers in a single game

Rank	Player	Club	Tally	Total	Opposition
1	Oliver McGrath	Wexford	3-06	15	Carlow
2	Willie Hogan	Carlow	4-01	13	Waterford
2	Jimmy Smyth	Clare	3-04	13	Offaly
3	Phil Grimes	Waterford	1-09	12	Tipperary
4	John McKenna	Tipperary	3-02	11	Waterford
4	Pat McNamara	Clare	3-02	11	Offaly
5	Liam Connolly	Tipperary	3-01	10	Offaly
5	Jimmy Smyth	Clare	3-01	10	Laois
5	Séamus Gohery	Galway	3-01	10	Westmeath
5	M. Cullinane	Galway	2-04	10	Antrim
5	Christy Ring	Cork	2-04	10	Limerick

=== Miscellaneous ===
- On 21 October 1962, Carlow defeated Cork by 1-17 to 1-12. It remains their only ever defeat of Cork in the National Hurling League.
