= Dick Roche (hurler) =

Irish hurler

Personal information
- Native name: Risteard de Róiste (Irish)
- Nickname: Dickie
- Born: 1935 Waterford, Ireland
- Died: 12 May 2014 (aged 79) Waterford, Ireland

Sport
- Sport: Hurling
- Position: Goalkeeper
Clubs
- Years: Club
- 1952 1953-1984: Ferrybank; Mount Sion
Club titles
- Waterford titles: 13
Inter-county*
Years	County	Apps (scores)
1956–1964	Waterford	5 (0-00)
Inter-county titles
- Munster titles: 1
- All-Irelands: 0
- NHL: 0
- *Inter County team apps and scores correct as of 22:16, 18 March 2015.

Richard "Dickie" Roche (1935 – 12 May 2014) was an Irish hurler who played as a goalkeeper for the Waterford senior team.

Born in Waterford, Roche first arrived on the inter-county scene at the age of twenty-one when he first linked up with the senior team. He made his debut during the 19565–57 league. Roche was a regular member of the team for much of the next decade and won one Munster medal. Her was an All-Ireland runner-up on one occasion.

In a club career that spanned four decades Roche won a combined total of sixteen championship medals as a hurler and Gaelic footballer with Mount Sion.

Throughout his career Roche made 5 championship appearances for Waterford. He retired from inter-county hurling following he conclusion of the 1964 championship.

== Honours ==
=== Team ===
Mount Sion

- Waterford Senior Hurling Championship (13): 1956, 1957, 1958, 1959, 1960, 1961, 1963, 1964, 1965, 1969, 1972, 1974, 1975
- Waterford Senior Football Championship (3): 1956, 1959, 1961
- Waterford Minor Hurling Championship (1): 1953

Waterford

- Munster Senior Hurling Championship (1): 1957
