= 1923 Waterford Senior Hurling Championship =

Annual hurling competition season

- Champions: Dungarvan (4th title)

The 1923 Waterford Senior Hurling Championship was the 23rd staging of the Waterford Senior Hurling Championship since its establishment by the Waterford County Board in 1897.

T. F. Meaghers were the defending champions.

Dungarvan won the championship. This was their fourth championship title overall and their first title since 1920.
