= 1940 Waterford Senior Hurling Championship =

Annual hurling competition season

- Champions: Mount Sion (3rd title)
- Runners-up: Dungarvan

The 1940 Waterford Senior Hurling Championship was the 40th staging of the Waterford Senior Hurling Championship since its establishment by the Waterford County Board in 1897.

Mount Sion were the defending champions.

On 8 December 1940, Mount Sion won the championship after a 6–05 to 3–02 defeat of Dungarvan in a replay of the final. This was their third ever championship title and their third title in succession.
