= Joe Condon =

Irish retired sportsperson

Personal information
- Native name: Seosamh Condún (Irish)
- Born: Waterford, Ireland
- Height: 5 ft 7 in (170 cm)

Sport
- Sport: Hurling
- Position: Right wing-forward
Club
- Years: Club
- 1950s-1970s: Erin's Own
Club titles
- Waterford titles: 1
Inter-county
- Years: County
- 1960s: Waterford
Inter-county titles
- Munster titles: 1
- All-Irelands: 0
- NHL: 1
- All Stars: 0

Joe Condon (born 1940 in Waterford, Ireland) is a retired Irish sportsman. He played hurling with his local club Erin's Own and was a member of the Waterford senior inter-county team in the 1960s.

Sporting positions
Preceded by Larry Guinan	Waterford Senior Hurling Captain; 1963	Succeeded by Mick Flannelly
