= 1945 Waterford Senior Hurling Championship =

Annual hurling competition season

- Champions: Mount Sion (5th title)
- Runners-up: Dungarvan

The 1945 Waterford Senior Hurling Championship was the 45th staging of the Waterford Senior Hurling Championship since its establishment by the Waterford County Board in 1897.

3rd Battalion were the defending champions.

On 21 October 1945, Mount Sion won the championship after a 3–08 to 2–05 defeat of Dungarvan in the final. This was their fifth championship title overall and their first title since 1943.
