= Jimmy Byrne =

Irish hurler

Jim O'Byrne
Personal information
- Native name: Séamus Ó Broin (Irish)
- Born: Waterford, Ireland
- Height: 5 ft 9 in (175 cm)

Sport
- Sport: Hurling
- Position: Left half back
Club
- Years: Club
- 1950s-1970s: Mount Sion
Inter-county
- Years: County
- 1960s: Waterford
Inter-county titles
- Munster titles: 1
- All-Irelands: 0
- NHL: 1
- All Stars: 0

Jim O'Byrne (born 1941) is an Irish retired hurler. He played hurling with his local club Mount Sion and was a member of the Waterford senior inter-county team in the 1950s and 1960s.
