= Mick Hickey (Waterford hurler) =

Irish hurler

Personal information
- Native name: Mícheál Ó hIcí (Irish)
- Born: 6 August 1911 Dungarvan, County Waterford, Ireland
- Died: 22 July 1998 (aged 86) Dunmore Road, Waterford, Ireland
- Occupation: Farmer
- Height: 5 ft 11 in (180 cm)

Sport
- Sport: Hurling
- Position: Right wing-back
Club
- Years: Club
- Portlaw
Club titles
- Waterford titles: 1
Inter-county
- Years: County
- Waterford
Inter-county titles
- Munster titles: 2
- All-Irelands: 1
- NHL: 0

Michael Hickey (6 August 1911 – 22 July 1998) was an Irish hurler who played as a goalkeeper and as a right wing-back for the Waterford senior team. He was the nephew of Michael O'Hickey.

Born in Portlaw, County Waterford, Hickey first arrived on the inter-county scene as a member of the Waterford junior team. Hickey subsequently became a regular member of the starting fifteen of the Waterford senior team and won one All-Ireland medal.

At club level Hickey was a one-time championship medallist with Portlaw.

== Honours ==
=== Team ===
Portlaw

- Waterford Senior Football Championship (1): 1937

Waterford

- All-Ireland Senior Hurling Championship (1): 1948
- Munster Junior Hurling Championship (1): 1936

Sporting positions
Preceded by	Waterford Senior Hurling Captain; 1938	Succeeded by Willie John Walsh
Preceded by Willie John Walsh	Waterford Senior Hurling Captain; 1938	Succeeded by John Keane
