= Ken McGrath =

Irish hurler (born 1978)

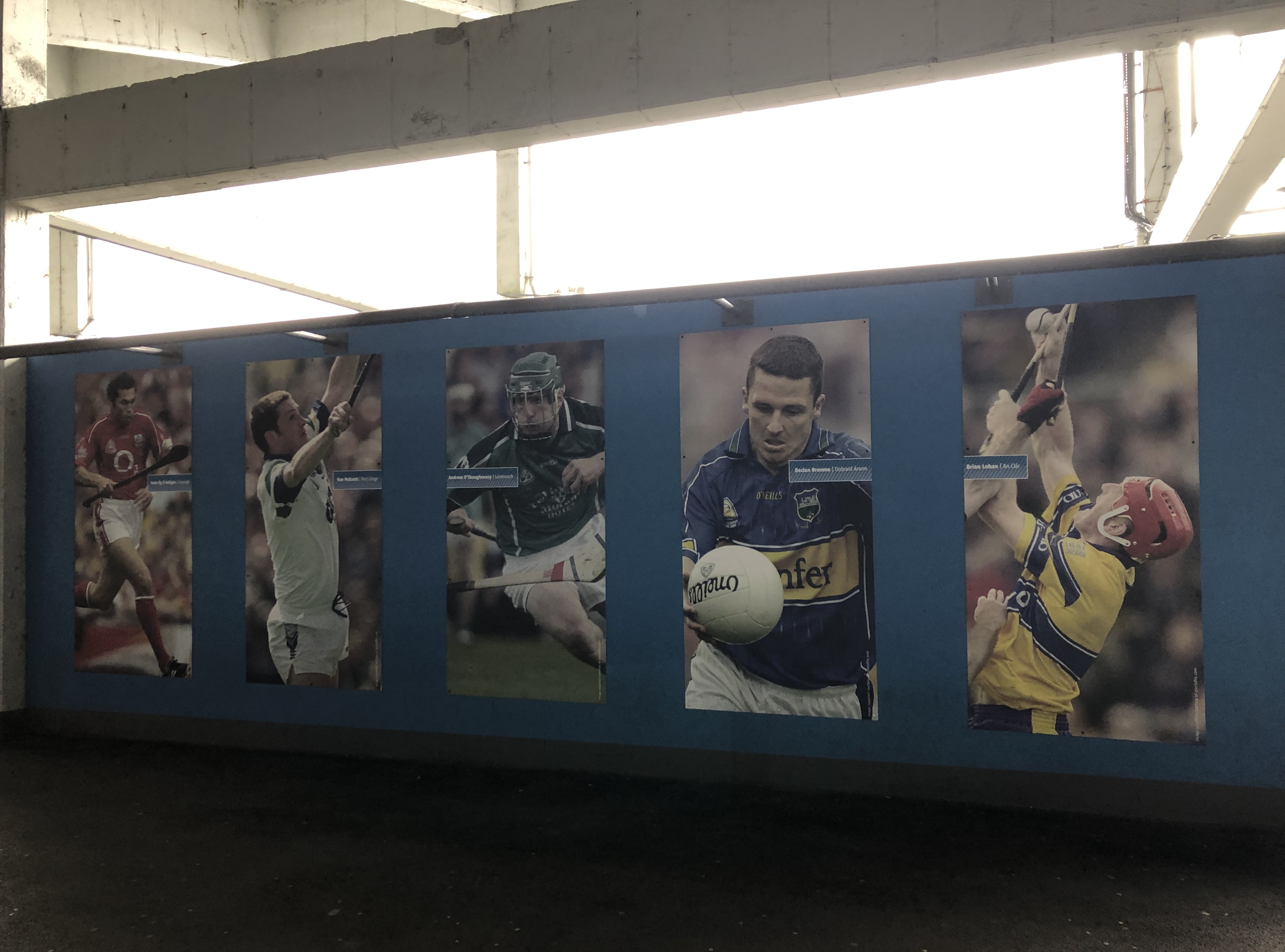

Personal information
- Native name: Cionnaith Mac Craith (Irish)
- Nickname: Mac
- Born: 20 February 1978 (age 48) Waterford, Ireland
- Occupation: Coffee Business
- Height: 6 ft 1 in (185 cm)

Sport
- Sport: Hurling
- Position: Centre Back
Club
- Years: Club
- 1995–: Mount Sion
Club titles
- Waterford titles: 6
- Munster titles: 1
Inter-county
Years	County	Apps (scores)
1996–2011	Waterford	51 (1–93)
Inter-county titles
- Munster titles: 4
- NHL: 1
- All Stars: 3

Ken McGrath (born 20 February 1978) is an Irish hurler and hurling selector who played as a centre-back for the Waterford senior team. He joined the team in 1996 and was a regular member of the starting fifteen until his retirement in 2011.

Son of former hurler Pat and older brother of former player Eoin, McGrath was a stalwart on the Waterford team for more than a decade. He has won four Munster winners' medals, one National League winners' medal and three All-Star awards. He ended up as an All-Ireland runner-up on one occasion.

At club level McGrath is a Munster medalist with Mount Sion. In addition to this he has also won six county club championship medals.

McGrath has also served as a selector with the Waterford senior hurling management team.

== Playing career ==
=== Club ===
McGrath plays his club hurling with the Mount Sion club in Waterford city and has had several successes.

In 1998 McGrath won his first county club championship medal following a 3–19 to 0–10 trouncing of Ballyduff Upper.

After surrendering their title to Ballygunner in 1999, Mount Sion were back the following year to exact revenge. A 1–20 to 0–9 defeat of Ballygunner gave McGrath a second county championship medal.

Mount Sion surrendered their club title in 2001, however, McGrath's side were back in the final again in 2002. A 1–19 to 2–14 defeat of Ballygunner secured the championship once again. It was the first of three county final victories in-a-row over Ballygunner.

In 2002 McGrath won a Munster club medal as Mount Sion defeated Sixmilebridge to take the title. The club was defeated in the subsequent All-Ireland semi-final.

Four club titles in-a-row proved beyond Mount Sion, however, the club bounced back in 2006 with McGrath winning a sixth county championship medal following a seven-point defeat of Ballygunner.

=== Inter-county ===
McGrath first came to prominence on the inter-county scene at the age of seventeen as a member of the Waterford minor hurling team. He later played with the under-21 county side.

By 1996 McGrath had joined the Waterford senior team and made his debut in that year's championship.

In 1998 McGrath played in his first Munster final in the senior grade. Waterford held All-Ireland champions Clare to a draw in the Munster final, however, the Decies lost the replay. McGrath's side later faced Kilkenny in the All-Ireland semi-final in what would be the county's first appearance in Croke Park since 1963. Kilkenny won by a single point.

Four years later in 2002 McGrath claimed his first Munster winners' medal as Waterford defeated Tipperary by 2–23 to 3–12 to claim the provincial crown for the first time in thirty-nine years.

After surrendering the Munster title to Cork in 2003, McGrath's side were back in the provincial showpiece for a third successive year in 2004. In the Munster final, Waterford defeated Cork for the first time in forty-five years to take the title by 3–16 to 1–21.

In 2007 McGrath added a National Hurling League medal to his collection when Waterford defeated Kilkenny by 0–20 to 0–18 in the final. He later claimed a third Munster winners' medal as Waterford defeated Limerick by 3–17 to 1–14 in the provincial decider. While Waterford were viewed as possibly going on and winning the All-Ireland title for the first time in almost half a century, Limerick ambushed McGrath's side in the All-Ireland semi-final.

2008 began poorly for Waterford as the team lost their opening game to Clare as well as their manager Justin McCarthy. In spite of this poor start McGrath's side reached the All-Ireland final for the first time in forty-five years. Kilkenny provided the opposition and went on to defeat Waterford by 3–30 to 1–13 to claim a third All-Ireland title in-a-row.

McGrath lined out in another Munster final in 2010 with Cork providing the opposition. A 2–15 apiece draw was the result on that occasion, however, Waterford went on to win the replay after an extra-time goal by Dan Shanahan. It was a fourth Munster winners' medal for McGrath, a record that he shares with five other Waterford players.

McGrath returned to inter-county hurling for the National League in 2011, however, midway through that competition he retired from the Waterford panel due to injury.

=== Inter-provincial ===
McGrath was also a regular on the Munster team at various times between 1997 and 2009. He won two Railway Cup medals, in 1997 and 2001.

== Coaching career ==
McGrath has some coaching experience with various Mount Sion underage teams. In 2012 he was announced as a replacement for Nicky Cashin as a Waterford selector under Michael Ryan. He resigned as selector in 2013 when Ryan stepped down.

== Media career ==
McGrath has been an analyst on League Sunday.

== Honours ==
=== Team ===
Mount Sion

- Munster Senior Club Hurling Championship (1): 2002
- Waterford Senior Club Hurling Championship (6): 1998, 2000, 2002, 2003, 2004, 2006

Waterford

- Munster Senior Hurling Championship (4): 2002, 2004, 2007, 2010
- National Hurling League (1): 2007

Munster

- Inter-provincial Championship (2): 1997, 2001

=== Individual ===
- All-Stars (3): 2002, 2004, 2007
- In May 2020, the Irish Independent named McGrath at number ten in its "Top 20 hurlers in Ireland over the past 50 years". He was the only inclusion without an All-Ireland medal.

Sporting positions
Preceded by Paul Flynn	Waterford Senior Hurling Captain; 2001	Succeeded by Fergal Hartley
Preceded by Tony Browne	Waterford Senior Hurling Captain; 2004	Succeeded by Eoin Kelly
