= 1932 Waterford Senior Hurling Championship =

Annual hurling competition season

- Champions: Erin's Own (6th title)
- Runners-up: Tallow

The 1932 Waterford Senior Hurling Championship was the 32nd staging of the Waterford Senior Hurling Championship since its establishment by the Waterford County Board in 1897.

Erin's Own were the defending champions.

Erin's Own won the championship after a 2–02 to 0–02 defeat of Tallow in the final. This was their sixth championship title overall and their sixth title in succession.
