= Oliver Gough =

Irish hurler (1935–2020)

Personal information
- Born: 25 August 1935 Graiguenamanagh, County Kilkenny, Ireland
- Died: 22 April 2020 (aged 84) Newbridge, County Kildare, Ireland
- Height: 5 ft 10 in (178 cm)

Sport
- Sport: Hurling
- Position: Centre-forward
Clubs
- Years: Club
- Gorey Emmets; Ferns St Aidan's; Rathnure; Thomastown
Inter-county
- Years: County
- 1955–1958 1962–1963: Wexford; Kilkenny
Inter-county titles
- Leinster titles: 3
- All-Irelands: 3
- NHL: 2

Oliver J. Gough (25 August 1935 – 22 April 2020) was an Irish hurler who played for a number of clubs, including Ferns St Aidan's, Rathnure and Thomastown. He played for the Wexford and Kilkenny senior hurling teams at various times between 1955 and 1963, during which time he usually lined out as a centre-forward. Gough was the last player to win All-Ireland Championships with two different teams.

== Honours ==
Wexford

- All-Ireland Senior Hurling Championship (2): 1955, 1956
- Leinster Senior Hurling Championship (2): 1955, 1956
- National Hurling League (2): 1955–56, 1957–58

Kilkenny

- All-Ireland Senior Hurling Championship (1): 1963
- Leinster Senior Hurling Championship (1): 1963
