= 1942 Waterford Senior Hurling Championship =

Annual hurling competition season

- Champions: Erin's Own (10th title)
- Runners-up: Lismore

The 1942 Waterford Senior Hurling Championship was the 42nd staging of the Waterford Senior Hurling Championship since its establishment by the Waterford County Board in 1897.

Dungarvan were the defending champions.

Erin's Own won the championship after a 2–05 to 2–03 defeat of Lismore in the final. This was their 10th championship title overall and their first title since 1935.
