= 1933 Waterford Senior Hurling Championship =

Annual hurling competition season

- Champions: Erin's Own (7th title)
- Runners-up: Dunhill

The 1933 Waterford Senior Hurling Championship was the 33rd staging of the Waterford Senior Hurling Championship since its establishment by the Waterford County Board in 1897.

Erin's Own were the defending champions.

Erin's Own won the championship after a 7–06 to 1–03 defeat of Dunhill in the final. This was their 7th championship title overall and their 7th title in succession.
