= 1959 All-Ireland Senior Hurling Championship =

Championship details
- Dates: 12 April – 4 October 1959
- Teams: 11

All-Ireland champions
- Winning team: Waterford (2nd win)
- Captain: Frankie Walsh

All-Ireland Finalists
- Losing team: Kilkenny
- Captain: Seán Clohessy

Provincial champions
- Munster: Waterford
- Leinster: Kilkenny
- Ulster: Not Played
- Connacht: Not Played

Championship statistics
- No. matches played: 13
- Top Scorer: Frankie Walsh (2–28)
- Player of the Year: Christy Ring
- All-Star Team: See here

Refereed by Jeremiah Fitzgerald (Rathkeale, Limerick) The 1959 All-Ireland Senior Hurling Championship was the 73rd staging of the All-Ireland Senior Hurling Championship, the Gaelic Athletic Association's premier inter-county hurling tournament. The championship began on 12 April 1959 and ended on 4 October 1959.

The championship was won by Waterford who secured the title following a 3–12 to 1–10 defeat of Kilkenny in the All-Ireland final. This was their second All-Ireland title, their first in eleven championship seasons. It remains their last All-Ireland triumph.

Tipperary were the defending champions but were defeated by Waterford in the Munster semi-final.

== Provincial changes ==
Due to a lack of competition in their own province, the Galway County Board proposed a regrading to junior status in January 1958. This led to a wider debate regarding the structure of the championship. The abolition of the provincial system and the introduction of an open draw was rejected. Galway put forward their own proposal for the creation of a new "province" consisting of Galway, Clare, Laois, Offaly and Westmeath, however, this was also rejected. The possibility of starting the National Hurling League in April in an effort to give Galway some game time before the start of the championship was also discussed. At a meeting of the Munster Council on 10 January 1959 it was decided to invite Galway to participate in all grades of hurling in Munster on a temporary basis. This decision was later ratified at the GAA Congress.

== Results ==
=== Leinster Senior Hurling Championship ===
First round

12 April 1959 First Round	Westmeath	2–03 – 3–04	Offaly	Cusack Park, Mullingar
	T Houlihan 2–0, S Bolger 0–2, J McGrath 0–1.		B Loughnane 1–2, T Cleary 1–0, T Errity 1–0, J Spain 0–2.

26 April 1959 First Round	Laois	3–08 – 0–08	Meath	O'Connor Park, Tullamore
	T Maher 1–3, P Lalor 1–1, J Lyons 1–1, W Bohane 0–1, F Walsh 0–1, J Conroy 0–1.		G Kelly 0–2, P Donoghue 0–2, A Foran 0–1, G Renehan 0–1, P McCabe 0–1, P Darby 0–1.	Referee: J Dowling (Offaly)

Second round

10 May 1959 Second Round	Laois	6–12 – 2–07	Offaly	O'Moore Park, Portlaoise
	T Maher 2–4, P Lalor 3–0, J Lyons 1–1, M Byrne 0–2, W Bohane 0–2, O Fennell 0–1, F Walsh 0–1, J Conroy 0–1.		T Errity 1–1, P Spellman 1–0, J Spain 0–3, P Molloy 0–1, B Gilmartin 0–1, J Minnock 0–1.	Referee: P Johnson (Kilkenny)

Semi-finals

21 June 1959 Semi-Final	Kilkenny	8–10 – 2–04	Laois	St. Brendan's Park, Birr
	T O'Connell 3–3, S Clohessy 2–3, D Carroll 0–4, P Kelly 1–0, M Fleming 1–0, S O'Brien 1–0.		T Maher 2–1, D Dunne 0–2, P Dillon 0–1.	Referee: J Dowling (Offaly)

28 June 1959 Semi-Final	Dublin	3–12 – 4–08	Wexford	Nowlan Park, Kilkenny
	H Doyle 0–5, A Young 1–0, B Boothman 1–0, P Kenny 1–0, F Whelan 0–3, D Foley 0–3, M Bohane 0–1.		P Gough 2–2, P Kehoe 1–2, O McGrath 1–0, T Flood 0–2, H O'Connor 0–1, M Bergin 0–1.

Final

12 July 1959 Final	Kilkenny	2–09 – 1–11	Dublin	Croke Park, Dublin
	T O'Connell 1–2, S Clohessy 1–0, D Carroll 0–3, M Walsh 0–2, D Heaslip 0–1, J McGovern 0–1.		D Foley 1–6, H Doyle 0–2, P Kenny 0–2, T Shannon 0–1.	Attendance: 31,312; Referee: E Kelly (Laois)

=== Munster Senior Hurling Championship ===
First round

24 May 1959 First round	Tipperary	2–09 – 1–07	Limerick	Cork Athletic Grounds, Cork
	D Nealon 1–1, M Maher 1–1, L Devaney 0–3, J McDonnell 0–2, Jimmy Doyle 0–1, T Wall 0–1.		M Tynan 1–0, L Moloney 0–3, L Hogan 0–2, D Kelly 0–1, M Hayes 0–1.	Referee: C Conway (Cork)

29 June 1959 First round	Waterford	7–11 – 0–08	Galway	Gaelic Grounds, Limerick
	F Walsh 1–7, D Whelan 3–0, S Power 2–0, L Guinan 1–1, T Cheasty 0–1, J Kiely 0–1, C Ware 0–1.		T Sweeney 0–3, J Conroy 0–1, M Fox 0–1, P Egan 0–1, N Murray 0–1, G Cahill 0–1.	Referee: M Walsh (Cork)

Semi-finals

21 June 1959 Semi-Final	Cork	4–15 – 1–03	Clare	Thurles Sportsfield, Thurles
	C Ring 1–8, P Barry 1–4, C Cooney 1–0, N O'Connell 1–0, N Gallagher 0–1, E Goulding 0–1, M Quane 0–1.		M Nugent 1–0, N Jordan 0–2, C Madigan 0–1.	Referee: G Fitzgerald (Limerick)

12 July 1959 Semi-Final	Waterford	9–03 – 3–04	Tipperary	Cork Athletic Grounds, Cork
	L Guinan 3–0, C Ware 2–0, F Walsh 1–2, S Power 1–1, J Kiely 1–0, D Whelan 1–0,		Jimmy Doyle 1–2, D Nealon 1–2, T Wall 1–0.	Referee: G Fitzgerald (Limerick)

Final

26 July 1959 Final	Waterford	3–09 – 2–09	Cork	Thurles Sportsfield, Thurles
	J Kiely 2–2, F Walsh 0–5, S Power 1–0, T Cheasty 0–2.		C Ring 1–5, P Barry 1–3, M Quane 0–1.	Attendance: 55,174; Referee: G Fitzgerald (Limerick)

=== All-Ireland Senior Hurling Championship ===
Finals

6 September 1959 Final	Waterford	1–17 – 5–5	Kilkenny	Croke Park
	F Walsh (0–5), T Cheasty (0–5), S Power (1–0), P Grimes (0–3), L Guinan (0–2), J Kiely (0–2).		T O'Connell (3–0), R Carroll (1–2), W Dwyer (1–1), P Kelly (0–1), S Clohessy (0–1).	Attendance: 73,707; Referee: G FitzGerald (Limerick)

4 October 1959 Final Replay	Waterford	3–12 – 1–10	Kilkenny	Croke Park
	T Cheasty (2–2), F Walsh (0–8), M Flannelly (1–1), L Guinan (0–1).		W Dwyer (0–5), D Heaslip (1–1), E Keher (0–2), S Clohessy (0–1), M Walsh (0–1).	Attendance: 77,285; Referee: G FitzGerald (Limerick)

== Championship statistics ==
=== Top scorers ===
Top scorers overall

Rank	Player	Club	Tally	Total	Matches	Average
1	Frankie Walsh	Waterford	2–27	33	5	6.60
2	Tommy O'Connell	Kilkenny	7-05	26	4	6.50
3	Timmy Maher	Laois	5-08	23	3	7.66
4	Christy Ring	Cork	2–13	19	2	8.50
5	Séamus Power	Waterford	5-01	16	5	3.20
5	Larry Guinan	Waterford	4-04	16	5	3.20
5	Tom Cheasty	Waterford	2–10	16	5	3.20
6	Seán Clohessy	Kilkenny	3-05	14	4	3.50
6	John Kiely	Waterford	3-05	14	5	2.80
7	Paddy Barry	Cork	2-07	13	2	6.50

Top scorers in a single game

Rank	Player	Club	Tally	Total	Opposition
1	Tommy O'Connell	Kilkenny	3-03	12	Laois
2	Christy Ring	Cork	1-08	11	Clare
3	Timmy Maher	Laois	2-04	10	Offaly
3	Frankie Walsh	Waterford	1-07	10	Galway
4	Larry Guinan	Waterford	3-00	9	Tipperary
4	Tommy O'Connell	Kilkenny	3-00	9	Waterford
4	Seán Clohessy	Kilkenny	2-03	9	Laois
4	Des Foley	Dublin	1-06	9	Kilkenny
5	Oliver Gough	Wexford	2-02	8	Dublin
5	John Kiely	Waterford	2-02	8	Cork
5	Tom Cheasty	Waterford	2-02	8	Kilkenny
5	Frankie Walsh	Waterford	0-08	8	Kilkenny

=== Miscellaneous ===
- In the Munster semi-final Waterford led All-Ireland champions Tipperary by 8–2 to 0–0 at half-time. Sports broadcaster Michael O'Hehir, who was commentating on another game, read the half-time result live on the radio but advised listeners not to pay any heed as he believed it to be a hoax.
- Waterford qualified for a third consecutive Munster final for the first time in their history.
- The All-Ireland final went to a replay for the first time since 1934. It held the record as the last replayed championship decider until 2012.
- Phil Grimes became the first and only Waterford player to win two All-Ireland medals. He did not play in his county's first championship triumph in 1948, however, he played in the opening round of the championship and was entitled to a winners' medal.

== Player facts ==
=== Debutantes ===
The following players made their début in the 1959 championship:

Player	Team	Date	Opposition	Game
Eddie Keher	Kilkenny	October 4	Waterford	All-Ireland final replay

== Sources ==
- Corry, Eoghan, The GAA Book of Lists (Hodder Headline Ireland, 2005).
- Donegan, Des, The Complete Handbook of Gaelic Games (DBA Publications Limited, 2005).
- Nolan, Pat, Flashbacks: A Half Century of Cork Hurling (The Collins Press, 2000).
- Sweeney, Éamonn, Munster Hurling Legends (The O'Brien Press, 2002).
