= 1934 Waterford Senior Hurling Championship =

Annual hurling competition season

- Champions: Erin's Own (8th title)
- Runners-up: Tallow

The 1934 Waterford Senior Hurling Championship was the 34th staging of the Waterford Senior Hurling Championship since its establishment by the Waterford County Board in 1897.

Erin's Own were the defending champions.

Erin's Own won the championship after a 6–04 to 0–02 defeat of Tallow in the final. This was their 8th championship title overall and their 8th title in succession.
