= 1931 Waterford Senior Hurling Championship =

Annual hurling competition season

- Champions: Erin's Own (5th title)
- Runners-up: Tallow

The 1931 Waterford Senior Hurling Championship was the 31st staging of the Waterford Senior Hurling Championship since its establishment by the Waterford County Board in 1897.

Erin's Own were the defending champions.

Erin's Own won the championship after a 4–07 to 0–03 defeat of Tallow in the final. This was their fifth championship title overall and their fifth title in succession.
