= GAA Hall of Fame =

Coordinates: 53.3607°N 6.2496°W

The GAA Hall of Fame is the hall of fame for Gaelic games in Ireland. The hall opened in the Cusack Stand, Croke Park, Dublin, on 11 February 2013, with 32 inaugural inductees.

== Inductees ==
Date	Code	Player	County	Code	Player	County
11 February 2013	Gaelic football	Dan O'Keeffe	Kerry	Hurling	Tony Reddin	Tipperary
11 February 2013	Gaelic football	Seán Flanagan	Mayo	Hurling	John Doyle	Tipperary
11 February 2013	Gaelic football	Joe Keohane	Kerry	Hurling	Nick O'Donnell	Wexford
11 February 2013	Gaelic football	Enda Colleran	Galway	Hurling	Bobby Rackard	Wexford
11 February 2013	Gaelic football	Martin O'Connell	Meath	Hurling	Paddy Phelan	Kilkenny
11 February 2013	Gaelic football	John Joe O'Reilly	Cavan	Hurling	John Keane	Waterford
11 February 2013	Gaelic football	Seán Murphy	Kerry	Hurling	Brian Whelahan	Offaly
11 February 2013	Gaelic football	Mick O'Connell	Kerry	Hurling	Lory Meagher	Kilkenny
11 February 2013	Gaelic football	Tommy Murphy	Laois	Hurling	Jack Lynch	Cork
11 February 2013	Gaelic football	Pat Spillane	Kerry	Hurling	Christy Ring	Cork
11 February 2013	Gaelic football	Seán Purcell	Galway	Hurling	Mick Mackey	Limerick
11 February 2013	Gaelic football	Seán O'Neill	Down	Hurling	Jim Langton	Kilkenny
11 February 2013	Gaelic football	Kevin Heffernan	Dublin	Hurling	Eddie Keher	Kilkenny
11 February 2013	Gaelic football	Tommy Langan	Mayo	Hurling	Ray Cummins	Cork
11 February 2013	Gaelic football	Mikey Sheehy	Kerry	Hurling	Jimmy Doyle	Tipperary
11 February 2013	Gaelic football	Tony McTague	Offaly	Hurling	Éamonn Cregan	Limerick
2 April 2014	Gaelic football	Mick O'Dwyer	Kerry	Hurling	Noel Skehan	Kilkenny
2 April 2014	Gaelic football	Micheál Kearins	Sligo	Hurling	Pat McGrath	Waterford
26 August 2015	Gaelic football	Jimmy Keaveney	Dublin	Hurling	Jimmy Barry-Murphy	Cork
18 August 2016	Gaelic football	Dermot Earley Snr	Roscommon	Hurling	Tony Doran	Wexford
18 August 2016	Gaelic football	John O'Keeffe	Kerry	Hurling	John Connolly	Galway
24 August 2017	Gaelic football	Jack O'Shea	Kerry	Hurling	Pádraig Horan	Offaly
24 August 2017	Gaelic football	Matt Connor	Offaly	Hurling	Frank Cummins	Kilkenny
28 August 2018	Gaelic football	Joe Kernan	Armagh	Hurling	Leonard Enright	Limerick
17 September 2019	Gaelic football	Colm O'Rourke	Meath	Hurling	Nicky English	Tipperary
17 September 2019	Gaelic football	Larry Tompkins	Cork	Hurling	Terence McNaughton	Antrim
17 September 2019	Gaelic football	Denis Moran	Kerry	Hurling	Conor Hayes	Galway
