= 1935 Waterford Senior Hurling Championship =

Annual hurling competition season

- Champions: Erin's Own (9th title)
- Runners-up: Tallow

The 1935 Waterford Senior Hurling Championship was the 35th staging of the Waterford Senior Hurling Championship since its establishment by the Waterford County Board in 1897.

Erin's Own were the defending champions.

Erin's Own won the championship after a 4–07 to 2–04 defeat of Tallow in the final. This was their 9th championship title overall and their 9th title in succession.
