= Pat McGrath (Waterford hurler) =

Irish hurler

Personal information
- Native name: Pádraig Mac Craith (Irish)
- Born: 1953 (age 72–73) Waterford, Ireland

Sport
- Sport: Hurling
- Position: Midfield
Club
- Years: Club
- Mount Sion
Club titles
- Waterford titles: 7
Inter-county*
Years	County	Apps (scores)
1970–1986	Waterford	16 (1-17)
Inter-county titles
- Munster titles: 0
- All-Irelands: 0
- NHL: 0
- All Stars: 0
- *Inter County team apps and scores correct as of 22:33, 3 April 2014.

Patrick "Pat" McGrath (born 1953) is an Irish retired hurler who played as a midfielder for the Waterford senior team.

Born in Waterford, McGrath first made an impression on the inter-county scene at the age of seventeen when he linked up with the Waterford minor team, before later joining the under-21 side. He joined the senior panel for the 1970 championship. McGrath went on to play a key role for Waterford for sixteen years, however, he enjoyed little success during his inter-county career. He was a Munster runner-up on two occasions.

As a member of the Munster inter-provincial team at various times throughout his career, McGrath won two Railway Cup medals. At club level he is a seven-time championship medallist with Mount Sion.

Throughout his career McGrath made 16 championship appearances for Waterford. His retirement came following the conclusion of the 1986 championship.

McGrath's sons, Eoin and Ken, also played with Waterford.

On 2 April 2014 McGrath was inducted into the GAA Hall of Fame.

== Honours ==
=== Player ===
Mount Sion

- Waterford Senior Club Hurling Championship (7): 1972, 1974, 1975, 1981, 1983, 1986, 1988

Waterford

- Munster Under-21 Hurling Championship (1): 1974 (c)

Munster

- Railway Cup (3): 1976, 1978, 1981 (sub)

=== Individual ===
Awards

- GAA Hall of Fame (1): 2014
