= 1929 Waterford Senior Hurling Championship =

Annual hurling competition season

- Champions: Erin's Own (3rd title)
- Runners-up: Lismore

The 1929 Waterford Senior Hurling Championship was the 29th staging of the Waterford Senior Hurling Championship since its establishment by the Waterford County Board in 1897.

Erin's Own were the defending champions.

Erin's Own won the championship after a 10–04 to 1–01 defeat of Lismore in the final. This was their third championship title overall and their third title in succession.
