= 1926 Waterford Senior Hurling Championship =

Annual hurling competition season

- Champions: Dungarvan (5th title)
- Runners-up: Lismore

The 1926 Waterford Senior Hurling Championship was the 26th staging of the Waterford Senior Hurling Championship since its establishment by the Waterford County Board in 1897.

Lismore were the defending champions.

Dungarvan won the championship after a 5–02 to 2–03 defeat of Lismore in the final. This was their fifth championship title overall and their first title since 1923.
