= 1920 Waterford Senior Hurling Championship =

Annual hurling competition season

- Champions: Dungarvan (3rd title)
- Runners-up: Ferrybank

The 1920 Waterford Senior Hurling Championship was the 21st staging of the Waterford Senior Hurling Championship since its establishment by the Waterford County Board in 1897.

Ferrybank were the defending champions.

Dungarvan won the championship after a 9–02 to 1–00 in the final. This was their third championship title overall and their first title since 1917.
