= 1930 Waterford Senior Hurling Championship =

Annual hurling competition season

- Champions: Erin's Own (4th title)
- Runners-up: Dungarvan

The 1930 Waterford Senior Hurling Championship was the 30th staging of the Waterford Senior Hurling Championship since its establishment by the Waterford County Board in 1897.

Erin's Own were the defending champions.

Erin's Own won the championship after a 6–04 to 0–01 defeat of Dungarvan in the final. This was their fourth championship title overall and their fourth title in succession.
