= Liam Connolly =

Irish hurler (1936–2007)

Personal information
- Native name: Liam Ó Conghaile (Irish)
- Born: 1936 Fethard, County Tipperary, Ireland
- Died: 4 July 2007 (aged 71) Wilton, Cork, Ireland
- Occupation: Driver
- Height: 5 ft 11 in (180 cm)

Sport
- Sport: Hurling
- Position: Left corner-forward
Club
- Years: Club
- 1951-1976: Fethard
Club titles
	Football	Hurling
Tipperary titles	2	0
Inter-county
- Years: County
- 1955-1967 1958-1963: Tipperary (SF); Tipperary (SH)
Inter-county titles
- Munster titles: 4
- All-Irelands: 3
- NHL: 3

William J. Connolly (1936 – 4 July 2007), known as Liam Connolly, was an Irish hurler and Gaelic footballer. At club level he played with Fethard and was a member of the Tipperary senior teams as a dual player.

== Career ==
Connolly started his playing career in unofficial juvenile competitions, street leagues and as a schoolboy. His career at adult level with Fethard spanned 25 years from 1951 to 1976. Connolly won Tipperary SFC titles in 1954 and 1957 and several South Tipperary divisional titles, the last of which came 22 years after his first in 1954. As a hurler, he won a South Tipperary SHC medal with Na Piarsaigh and a South Tipperary JAHC title with Coolmoyne. Connolly first appeared on the inter-county scene as a dual player and was a member of the Tipperary minor hurling team that beat Dublin in the 1953 All-Ireland minor final. After his two-year stint as a minor, he progressed onto the junior team. Connolly spent 12 years with the Tipperary senior football team, however, it was as a member of the Tipperary senior hurling team that he won All-Ireland medals in 1958, 1961 and 1962. His enjoyed his last inter-county victory in 1966 as a member of the intermediate hurling team that won the All-Ireland title.

== Death ==
Connolly died after a period of ill health on 4 July 2007, aged 71.

== Honours ==
Fethard

- Tipperary Senior Football Championship: 1954, 1957
- South Tipperary Senior Football Championship: 1954, 1955, 1957, 1969, 1976

Na Piarsaigh

- South Tipperary Senior Hurling Championship: 1957

Tipperary

- All-Ireland Senior Hurling Championship: 1958, 1961, 1962
- Munster Senior Hurling Championship: 1958, 1960, 1961, 1962
- National Hurling League: 1958–59, 1959–60, 1960–61
- All-Ireland Intermediate Hurling Championship: 1966
- Munster Intermediate Hurling Championship: 1966
- All-Ireland Minor Hurling Championship: 1953
- Munster Minor Hurling Championship: 1953, 1954

Sporting positions
Preceded by	Tipperary senior football team captain 1958	Succeeded by
