= Tom Cheasty =

Waterford hurler

Personal information
- Native name: Tomás Ó Síosta (Irish)
- Nickname: The Iron Man
- Born: 4 February 1934 Ballyduff, County Waterford, Ireland
- Died: 10 August 2007 (aged 73) Killure, County Waterford, Ireland
- Occupation: Farmer
- Height: 5 ft 8 in (173 cm)

Sport
- Sport: Hurling
- Position: Centre-forward
Clubs
- Years: Club
- Ballyduff Lower; Ballyduff Lower-Portlaw; Portlaw
Club titles
- Waterford titles: 5
Inter-county
Years	County	Apps (scores)
1954–1967	Waterford	30 (5–29)
Inter-county titles
- Munster titles: 3
- All-Irelands: 1
- NHL: 0

Thomas Cheasty (4 February 1934 – 10 August 2007) was an Irish hurler who played as a centre-forward at senior level for the Waterford county team.

Born in Knockaderry near Ballyduff, County Waterford, Cheasty first arrived on the inter-county scene as a dual player in the minor grade with Waterford. He made his senior debut in the 1954–55 National Hurling League. Cheasty went on to play a key part for Waterford in what has come to be known as a defining era for the county, and won one All-Ireland SHC medal and three Munster SHC medals.

Cheasty represented the Munster inter-provincial team on a number of occasions throughout his career, winning three Railway Cup medals in 1958, 1960 and 1961. At club level he won five championship medals with Portlaw.

Cited by many of his hurling peers as one of Waterford's greatest-ever players, Cheasty was described by Jim Irish as "the greatest centre-forward I ever played with or saw in Waterford."

Cheasty retired from inter-county hurling after breaking his finger during a 1967 championship clash with Cork.

== Playing career ==
=== Club ===
Cheasty started his club hurling with his local Ballyduff Lower GAA club winning a Junior Hurling County medal in 1961. The club merged with neighbours Portlaw GAA in the late 1960s. He won one county titles with Ballyduff Lower/Portlaw in 1970. Ballyduff and Portlaw went their separate ways in 1971 and Cheasty elected to play with Portlaw, winning four more County Championships, the last in 1977 at the age of 43. He would later win a Junior Hurling County medals with his native club Ballyduff Lower in 1983, a few months shy of his 50th birthday.

=== Inter-county ===
After an unsuccessful dual minor career, Cheasty's senior hurling career had something of an unorthodox beginning. While attending a National League game between Waterford and Kilkenny at Walsh Park as a spectator, the former team were so short of players that the selectors resorted to searching the crowd for hurlers. Cheasty volunteered his services on that occasion, and, within two years, he had become a regular member of Waterford's championship fifteen.

In 1957, Waterford made a long-awaited breakthrough in the championship. A 1–11 to 1–6 defeat of reigning provincial champions Cork gave Cheasty his first Munster SHC medal. The subsequent All-Ireland SHC decider saw Kilkenny provide the opposition. Waterford had a one-point lead at the interval and looked destined to claim their second All-Ireland SHC crown when they stretched their lead to six points in the second-half. A Kilkenny revival put an end to Waterford's hopes, with Cheasty's side facing a narrow 4–10 to 3–12 defeat.

After surrendering their provincial title the following year, Waterford bounced back in 1959. A 3–9 to 2–9 defeat of Cork gave Cheasty a second Munster medal. Once again Waterford subsequently lined out in the championship decider, with Kilkenny providing the opposition once again. The game was another exciting affair and with ninety seconds left in the game Kilkenny were ahead by three points. Just then Séamus Power scored the equalising goal to force a remarkable 1–17 to 5–5 draw. The replay was another great game with both sides giving it their all. Waterford scored three goals in the opening thirty minutes, with Cheasty finding the net twice, to help his side to a 3–12 to 1–10 win. The victory gave him an All-Ireland SHC medal.

Cheasty added an Oireachtas medal to his collection in 1962 following a 4–12 to 3–9 defeat of Tipperary.

In 1963, Cheasty found himself in the unusual situation when, after starring for Waterford in the National League 'home' final against Tipperary, he missed the final 'proper' against New York, having been suspended for violating the GAA's controversial 'ban' after attending a dance run by a local soccer club. He returned to inter-county activity for the championship, and won a third Munster SHC medal following an 0–11 to 0–8 victory over three-in-a-row hopefuls Tipperary. For the third successive time Kilkenny turned out to be Waterford's opponents in the subsequent All-Ireland SHC final. Things weren't going well for Cheasty's side and at one stage Waterford were eleven points in arrears. The men from the Déise clawed back this deficit to two points but an expert display of free-taking by Eddie Keher proved the difference as Kilkenny won by 4–17 to 6–8.

Cheasty retired from inter-county hurling in 1967 after breaking his finger in a provincial defeat of All-Ireland SHC champion, Cork.

=== Inter-provincial ===
Cheasty also lined out for Munster in the inter-provincial series of games.

In 1958, he was first called into action with the province, and subsequently won a Railway Cup medal following a 3–7 to 3–5 defeat of Leinster.

After a one-year absence, Cheasty was back on the Munster team in 1960 and 1961. Back-to-back defeats of Leinster brought his Railway Cup medal tally to three.

== Personal life ==
Born in Ballyduff, Kilmeaden, County Waterford, his father, Geoffrey, was a native of the parish. His mother, Kathleen Walsh, was from Mooncoin in South Kilkenny and, at the age of four, he went to live with his maternal aunt and uncle in Kilkenny for a short period. On his return to Ballyduff he finished his schooling and began work on the family farm.

His inter-county hurling career over, Cheasty married local Ballyduff girl Kathleen Kelly and settled down, having purchased a farm in Killure near Waterford Airport. Together the couple had three daughters, Siobhán, Margaret and Catherine, and one son, Geoffrey. One of their daughters died suddenly as a young woman.

In July 2007, Cheasty fell and then developed pneumonia. He died at Waterford Regional Hospital on 10 August 2007.

== Honours ==
=== Team ===
Ballyduff Lower-Portlaw

- Waterford Senior Club Hurling Championship (1): 1970

Portlaw

- Waterford Senior Club Hurling Championship (4): 1971, 1973, 1976, 1977

Waterford

- All-Ireland Senior Hurling Championship (1): 1959
- Munster Senior Hurling Championship (3): 1957, 1959, 1963
- National Hurling League (1): 1962–63 (sub)
- Oireachtas Tournament (1): 1962

Munster

- Railway Cup (3): 1958, 1960, 1961
