= 1947 Waterford Senior Hurling Championship =

Annual hurling competition season

- Champions: Erin's Own (12th title)
- Runners-up: Clonea

The 1947 Waterford Senior Hurling Championship was the 47th staging of the Waterford Senior Hurling Championship since its establishment by the Waterford County Board in 1897.

Erin's Own were the defending champions.

Erin's Own won the championship after a 3–04 to 3–01 defeat of Clonea in the final. This was their 12th championship title overall and their second title in succession.
