= Tommy O'Connell (Kilkenny hurler) =

Irish hurler (1939–2019)

Personal information
- Native name: Tomás Ó Conaill (Irish)
- Nickname: TC
- Born: 20 October 1939 Romford, Essex, England
- Died: 16 May 2019 (aged 79) Kilkenny, Ireland
- Occupation: Mechanic
- Height: 5 ft 9 in (175 cm)

Sport
- Sport: Hurling
- Position: Left corner-forward
Clubs
- Years: Club
- Éire Óg; Fenians
Club titles
- Kilkenny titles: 2
Inter-county
- Years: County
- 1958–1966: Kilkenny
Inter-county titles
- Leinster titles: 3
- All-Irelands: 0
- NHL: 0

Thomas O'Connell (20 October 1939 – 16 May 2019) is an Irish retired hurler who played as a left corner-forward for the Kilkenny senior team.

O'Connell made his first appearance for the team during the 1959 championship and was a semi-regular member of the starting fifteen for the following seven seasons. During that time he won one Leinster winners' medal. He ended up as an All-Ireland runner-up on one occasion, after scoring a hat-trick of goals in the final.

At club level O'Connell was a two-time county club championship medalist with Fenians.
