= Tom Cunningham (hurler) =

Irish sportsperson (1931–2022)

Personal information
- Native name: Tomás Ó Cuinneagáin (Irish)
- Born: 6 April 1931 Dungarvan, County Waterford
- Died: 28 April 2022 (aged 91)
- Height: 5 ft 9 in (175 cm)

Sport
- Sport: Hurling and Football
- Position: Corner-back
Club
- Years: Club
- 1940s-1960s: Dungarvan
Club titles
- Waterford titles: 0
Inter-county
- Years: County
- 1950s-1960s: Waterford
Inter-county titles
- Munster titles: 3
- All-Irelands: 1
- NHL: 1
- All Stars: 0

Tom Cunningham (6 April 1931 – 28 April 2022) was an Irish sportsperson. He played hurling with his local club Dungarvan and was a member of the Waterford senior inter-county team in the 1950s and 1960s. Cunningham died on 28 April 2022, at the age of 91.
