= Frankie Walsh =

Waterford hurler

Personal information
- Native name: Prionsias Breathnach (Irish)
- Born: 1936 Waterford, Ireland
- Died: 28 December 2012 (aged 76) Waterford, Ireland
- Occupation: Welder
- Height: 5 ft 7 in (170 cm)

Sport
- Sport: Hurling
- Position: Left half-forward
Club
- Years: Club
- 1955–1974: Mount Sion
Club titles
	Football	Hurling
Waterford titles	3	12
Inter-county
Years	County	Apps (scores)
1956–1970	Waterford	31 (10–84)
Inter-county titles
- Munster titles: 3
- All-Irelands: 1
- NHL: 1

Frankie Walsh (1936 – 28 December 2012) was an Irish hurler who played as a left wing-forward at senior level for the Waterford county team.

Walsh made his first appearance for the team during the 1956 championship and was a regular member of the starting fifteen until his retirement after the 1970 championship. During that time he won one All-Ireland medal, three Munster medals and one National Hurling League medal. In 1959 Walsh captained the team to the All-Ireland title.

At club level Walsh had a lengthy career with Mount Sion, winning twelve county club championship.

In retirement from playing Walsh became involved in team management. He trained the Waterford senior hurling team in the early 1970s before later serving as manager of the Mount Sion senior hurling team in the early 1990s.

== Biography ==
Frankie Walsh was born in the city of Waterford in 1936. He was greatly influenced by John Keane (a distant relative) and others from the 1948 All-Ireland Senior Hurling Championship winning team. The year after this victory Walsh began hurling with Mount Sion CBS in the street leagues in the city. He captured his very first medal that same year when defeating Roanmore in the street league final. In 1953 Walsh was a member of the Mount Sion team that competed in the Dr Harty Cup competition. Mount Sion defeated St Flannan's College of Ennis in the final to take the title. Walsh later worked as a welder in his native Waterford.

== Playing career ==
=== Club ===
Walsh played his club hurling and football with the Mount Sion club and enjoyed much success in a career that spanned three decades.

After winning a county minor championship medal in 1953, Walsh joined the Mount Sion senior hurling team in 1954. That year the club won the championship after a defeat of Erin's Own, however, Walsh was an unused substitute and didn't receive a medal.

By 1955 Walsh was a regular member of the Mount Sion starting fifteen. A 2–10 to 3–4 defeat of Abbeyside gave Walsh his first championship medal on the field of play. It was the first of seven successive championships for Walsh as Mount Sion continued to dominated club hurling in Waterford.

During this period Walsh also lined out with the Mount Sion senior football team. In 1956 he won his first championship medal as Dungarvan by 3–2 to 2–4. Three years later in 1959 Walsh added a second championship medal to his collection as De La Salle were accounted for. He won his third and final football championship medal in 1961 as Stardbally were defeated by 3–5 to 2–3.

A record-breaking ten-in-a-row proved beyond the Mount Sion hurling team as Erin's Own bested them in the championship decider of 1962. In spite of this Walsh's side bounced back the following year to record a 4–6 to 3–4 defeat of Ballygunner. The victory began another great run of success as further defeats of Abbeyside and Ballygunner gave Mount Sion a hat-trick of championship titles.

After several years out of the limelight, Mount Sion returned to the top of the championship pile once again in 1969. A huge 7–11 to 2–13 defeat of Abbeyside gave Walsh his eleventh championship medal.

Three years later Walsh was in the twilight of his club hurling career as Mount Sion reached the championship decider. A 2–10 to 2–8 defeat of Dunhill gave Mount Sion the title and gave Walsh a remarkable twelfth championship medal.

=== Inter-county ===
Walsh first came to prominence at inter-county level as a member of the Waterford minor hurling team; however, he had little success in this grade. He subsequently made his debut for the senior team in a National Hurling League relegation game against Kilkenny and later made his championship debut against Cork in 1956. Ironically, Walsh's first championship game could easily have been his last as he received a fractured skull from a swinging hurley.

In spite of his injury Walsh was back on the team again in 1957. That year he lined out in his first provincial decider with reigning champions Cork providing the opposition. Waterford were the underdogs going into the game; however, at the long whistle Walsh ended up with a Munster medal following a 1–11 to 1–6 victory. The men from the Déise later lined out in the All-Ireland final with Kilkenny providing the opposition. Over 70,000 spectators turned up at Croke Park to see an exciting game of hurling. With fifteen minutes left in the game Waterford led by six points. Two quick goals for "the Cats", together with a great point by captain Mickey Kelly reversed the trend and gave Kilkenny a 4–10 to 3–12 victory.

Waterford lost their provincial crown in 1958 but the team bounced back in 1959 with Walsh, who was now captain of the side, collecting a second Munster medal following a 3–9 to 2–9 win over Cork. Once again Waterford subsequently lined out in the championship decider and, once again, Kilkenny provided the opposition. The game was another exciting affair and with ninety seconds left in the game Kilkenny were ahead by three points. Just then Séamus Power scored the equalising goal to force a 1–17 to 5–5 draw. The replay was another great game with both sides giving it their all. Waterford scored three goals in the opening thirty minutes while Walsh scored a spectacular eighth point to help his side to a 3–12 to 1–10 win. It was his first, and only, All-Ireland medal, while he also had the honour of collecting the Liam MacCarthy Cup.

Four years later in 1963 Walsh added a National Hurling League medal to his collection before winning a third Munster title following a victory over the great Tipperary team of the decade. For the third successive time Kilkenny turned out to be Waterford's opponents in the subsequent All-Ireland final. All was not going well for Walsh's side and at one stage Waterford were eleven points in arrears. The men from the Déise pulled back this deficit to two points but an expert display by Eddie Keher proved the difference as Kilkenny won by 4–17 to 6–8.

Walsh continued playing with Waterford until 1970.

=== Inter-provincial ===
Walsh also lined out with Munster in the inter-provincial hurling competition. He first lined out with his province in 1957 and collected a Railway Cup medal that year as Munster defeated arch-rivals Leinster. Walsh was captain of the side in 1960 as Leinster were accounted for again in Railway Cup final. It was the first of two in-a-row for the southern province and for Walsh. After defeat in 1962 he collected two more Railway Cup medals in 1963 and 1966.

== Honours ==
=== As a player ===
Mount Sion C.B.S

- Dr Harty Cup (1): 1953

Mount Sion

- Waterford Senior Club Hurling Championship (12): 1955, 1956, 1957, 1958, 1959, 1960, 1961, 1963, 1964, 1965, 1969, 1972
- Waterford Senior Club Football Championship (3): 1956, 1959, 1961

Waterford

- All-Ireland Senior Hurling Championship (1): 1959 (c)
- Munster Senior Hurling Championship (3): 1957, 1959 (c), 1963
- National Hurling League (1): 1962–63

Munster

- Railway Cup (5): 1957, 1960 (c), 1961, 1963, 1966

Sporting positions
Preceded by Séamus Power	Waterford Senior Hurling Captain; 1959–1960	Succeeded by Martin Óg Morrissey
Achievements
Preceded by Tony Wall	All-Ireland SHC winning captain 1959	Succeeded by Nick O'Donnell
Preceded by Tony Wall	Railway Cup Hurling Final winning captain 1960	Succeeded by Tony Wall
