= Larry Guinan =

Irish hurler

Personal information
- Native name: Labhrás Ó Coinneáin (Irish)
- Born: 27 September 1937 (age 89) Waterford, Ireland
- Occupation: Garage owner
- Height: 5 ft 8 in (173 cm)

Sport
- Sport: Hurling
- Position: Forward
Club
- Years: Club
- 1950s-1970s: Mount Sion
Club titles
	Football	Hurling
Waterford titles	3	11
Inter-county
Years	County	Apps (scores)
1957–1973	Waterford	31 (12-11)
Inter-county titles
- Munster titles: 3
- All-Irelands: 1
- NHL: 1
- All Stars: 0

Larry Guinan (born 1937 in Waterford) is an Irish retired sportsperson. He played hurling with his local club Mount Sion and was a member of the Waterford senior inter-county team in the 1960s.

He first came on the scene in the famous Waterford street leagues when his street, Ard na Gréine, won numerous city titles. A product of St Patrick's CBS in the city he automatically graduated to the Mount Sion club and was a success. His first glimpse of Croke Park was when he played in the 1957 All-Ireland final against Kilkenny.

Sporting positions
Preceded by Martin Óg Morrissey	Waterford Senior Hurling Captain; 1962	Succeeded by Joe Condon
