= Martin Óg Morrissey =

Irish hurler (1934–2024)

Personal information
- Native name: Máirtín Óg Ó Muirgheasa (Irish)
- Nickname: Óg
- Born: 1934 Waterford, Ireland
- Died: 19 December 2024 (aged 90) Waterford, Ireland
- Occupation: Meat factory worker
- Height: 5 ft 8 in (173 cm)

Sport
- Sport: Hurling
- Position: Centre-back
Clubs
- Years: Club
- 1951–1952 1953–1974: Gaedheal Óg; Mount Sion
Club titles
	Football	Hurling
Waterford titles	5	15
Inter-county
- Years: County
- 1955–1968: Waterford
Inter-county titles
- Munster titles: 3
- All-Irelands: 1
- NHL: 1

Martin Óg Morrissey (1934 – 19 December 2024) was an Irish hurler, Gaelic footballer and selector. At club level he played as a dual player with Mount Sion, and also lined out at inter-county level with various Waterford teams.

== Playing career ==
Morrissey first played hurling to a high standard as a student at Mount Sion CBS. His performances there earned selection to the Munster Colleges inter-provincial team in 1951, while two years later he captained the college's senior team to their Harty Cup triumph.

Morrissey's club career began at minor level with the Mount Sion juvenile section, with whom he won Waterford MHC medals in 1949 and 1950. A disagreement resulted in him leaving the club and lining out with junior side Gaedheal Óg, however, Morrissey returned to Mount Sion in 1953. His return coincided with the club's greatest era of success and he won nine consecutive Waterford SHC medals between 1953 and 1961. During that time, Morrissey also won five Waterford SFC medals as Mount Sion completed five doubles. His club career continued until 1974, by which time he had won a total of 15 SHC medals.

At inter-county level, Morrissey first appeared for Waterford as member of the minor team in 1950. He later spent some time with the junior team before making his senior team debut in 1955. Morrissey established himself as first-choice centre-back during one of Waterford's greatest eras. He won Munster SHC medals in 1957, 1959 and 1963 and, while the era was bookended by All-Ireland final defeats, Morrissey won an All-Ireland SHC medal after a defeat of Kilkenny in 1959. He also won a National Hurling League title in 1963.

Morrissey's performances for Waterford resulted in his selection for the Munster team on five consecutive occasions. During that time, he won four consecutive Railway Cup medals.

== Management career ==
Morrissey became a selector to the Waterford senior team in September 1982. His one season in management saw a 19-point defeat by Cork in the 1983 Munster final.

== Death ==
Morrissey died in Waterford on 19 December 2024, at the age of 90.

== Honours ==
Mount Sion CBS

- Harty Cup: 1953

Mount Sion

- Waterford Senior Hurling Championship: 1953, 1954, 1955, 1956, 1957, 1958, 1959, 1960, 1961, 1963, 1964, 1965, 1969, 1972, 1974
- Waterford Senior Football Championship: 1953, 1955, 1956, 1959, 1961
- Waterford Minor Hurling Championship: 1949, 1950

Waterford

- All-Ireland Senior Hurling Championship: 1959
- Munster Senior Hurling Championship: 1957, 1959, 1963
- National Hurling League: 1962–63

Munster

- Railway Cup: 1958, 1959, 1960, 1961

Sporting positions
Preceded by Frankie Walsh	Waterford Senior Hurling Captain; 1961	Succeeded by Larry Guinan
