= Phil Grimes =

Waterford hurler

Personal information
- Native name: Pilib Ó Gormshúil (Irish)
- Nickname: Philly
- Born: 8 May 1929 Waterford, Ireland
- Died: 8 May 1989 (aged 60) Waterford, Ireland

Sport
- Sport: Hurling
- Position: Midfield
Club
- Years: Club
- Mount Sion
Club titles
- Waterford titles: 14 Hurling, 5 Football
- Munster titles: 2
- All-Ireland Titles: 2
Inter-county
Years	County	Apps (scores)
1948–1965	Waterford	32 (11–71)
Inter-county titles
- Munster titles: 3
- All-Irelands: 2
- NHL: 1

Phillip "Philly" Grimes (8 May 1929 – 8 May 1989) was an Irish hurler who played as a midfielder at senior level for the Waterford county team.

Born in Waterford, Grimes first played competitive hurling during his schooling at Mount Sion CBS. He arrived on the inter-county scene at the age of 17 when he first linked up with the Waterford minor team. He joined the senior team during the 1947–48 league. Grimes immediately became a regular member of the starting 15, and won two All-Ireland medals, three Munster medals and one National Hurling League medal on the field of play. He was an All-Ireland runner-up on two occasions.

As a member of the Munster inter-provincial team on a number of occasions, Grimes won two Railway Cup medals. At club level he was a 14-time championship and five-time senior football medallist with Mount Sion.

Throughout his career Grimes made 32 championship appearances. He retired from inter-county hurling following the conclusion of the 1965 championship.

== Early life ==
Phil Grimes was born in Waterford in 1929 and was educated locally at the Mount Sion Schools. In a career that lasted eighteen years he also played for Waterford and Munster.

== Playing career ==
=== Club ===
Grimes played his club hurling with his local Mount Sion club. He won the first of his fourteen senior hurling county titles in 1948 when he was just out of minor ranks and was a senior player when Mount Sion won a record equalling nine consecutive county senior hurling titles (1953–62). Grimes won a further three county titles in-a-row in 1963, 1964 and 1965. He also helped Mount Sion to four county senior football titles. All his fourteen senior hurling and four senior football medals were won within a period of 18 years.

=== Inter-county ===
Grimes first came to prominence as a member of the Waterford senior county team in the late 1940s. He played in the first round of the Munster SHC in 1948, but emigrated to the United States shortly afterwards. He still, however, qualified to be presented with a set of Munster and All-Ireland SHC medals.

When Grimes returned to Ireland, he rejoined the county team and won his first Munster SHC title on the field of play in 1957. Waterford later played Kilkenny in the All-Ireland SHC final but did not win.

Waterford lost their provincial crown in 1958 but the team recovered in 1959 with Grimes collecting a second Munster title. Waterford subsequently lined out in the championship decider and, once again, Kilkenny provided the opposition. This game ended in a draw, but when the two sides met for the replay a few weeks later, Waterford defeated their neighbours and Grimes collected his first All-Ireland SHC medal that was won on the field of play.

In 1962, Grimes won an Oireachtas medal when Waterford defeated All-Ireland champions Tipperary. Then, in 1963, he added a National Hurling League medal to his collection before winning a third Munster SHC title. For the third successive time Kilkenny turned out to be Waterford's opponents in the subsequent All-Ireland SHC final, but Waterford were beaten on that occasion.

After his playing days were over, he was selected at centre-field, alongside Séamus Power, on the Waterford Centenary Team 1984 and the Waterford Millennium Team 2000. Grimes was also chosen at centre-field on the Munster Millennium team in 2000.

=== Provincial ===
Grimes won Railway Cup honours with Munster in 1958 and 1960.

== Death ==
Phil Grimes died on his sixtieth birthday after a long battle with illness.
