= Séamus Power (Waterford hurler) =

Irish hurler

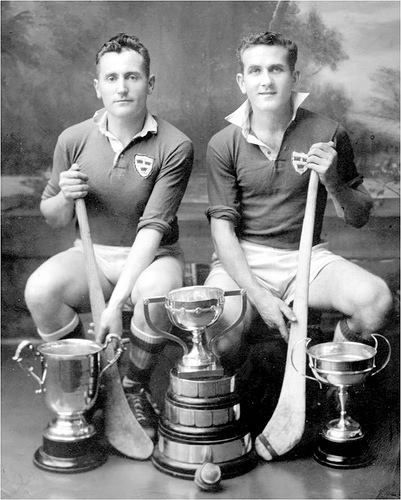
- Séamus Power and Phil Grimes c. 1959

Personal information
- Native name: Séamus de Paor (Irish)
- Nickname: the hammer
- Born: 24 October 1929 Waterford, Ireland
- Died: 25 June 2016 (aged 86) Waterford, Ireland
- Height: 5 ft 9 in (175 cm)

Sport
- Sport: Hurling
- Position: Midfield
Club
- Years: Club
- 1940s–1960s: Mount Sion
Club titles
- Waterford titles: 12 Hurling, 4 Football
Inter-county
Years	County	Apps (scores)
1949–1965	Waterford	31 (17–23)
Inter-county titles
- Munster titles: 3
- All-Irelands: 1
- NHL: 1
- All Stars: 0

Séamus Power (born 1929 in Waterford, Ireland, died 25 June 2016) was an Irish hurler who played for his local club Mount Sion and at senior level for the Waterford county team in the 1950s and 1960s. He first appeared in a Waterford jersey when he played at full-forward for the Waterford minor hurling team defeated by Cork in 1946 and he first played for the senior team in 1949 against Limerick when he came on as a substitute for Davy Power. He was playing for the Roscrea club at that time as he was working there for the Post Office.

On his transfer back to the Waterford Post Office he played for the Mount Sion club where he became one of its greatest players, captaining two championship winning teams; hurling in 1958 and football in 1959. His mid-field partnership with Philly Grimes is reckoned to be one of the greatest of all time. He was also a footballer of considerable merit and represented Waterford for a number of years.

Long after his playing days were over he was selected at centre-field, alongside Philly Grimes, on the Waterford Centenary Team 1984 and the Waterford Millennium Team 2000.

== Achievements ==
At the club level with Mount Sion, he earned three county minor medals between 1945 and 1947. During a thirteen-year period as a senior player, he won sixteen county senior championship medals, consisting of twelve in hurling and four in football.

He was a prominent member of the Mount Sion team that dominated local competitions during this era. The club provided six players Martin Og Morrissey, Seamus Power, Philly Grimes, Mick Flanelly, Frankie Walsh, and Larry Guinan to the Waterford county team between 1957 and 1963.

His Inter county honours include one senior All-Ireland medal, one National League title, one Oireachtas medal. three Munster titles, and six Railway Cup medals. Following his playing career, he served as a trainer, coach, and selector for the Waterford senior hurling team and held similar roles with Mount Sion. Additionally, he was a prominent hurling refree.

He won one senior All-Ireland medal, one National League, one Oireachtas, three Munster and six Railway Cup medals. He was trainer, coach and selector to the county senior hurling team for a number of years and held similar positions with the Mount Sion club. He was also one of the top referees in hurling and was in charge of the National League final in New York in the 1960s.

== Administration ==
He was secretary of the Mount Sion club from 1955 until 1969 and then, in 1970, he took over as club chairman from Pat Fanning when the latter became GAA president. He later became one of Waterford's representatives on both the Munster Council and the GAA Central Council.

== Honours ==
=== Waterford ===
- All-Ireland Senior Hurling Championship:
  - Winner (1): 1959
  - Runner-up (2): 1957, 1963
- Munster Senior Hurling Championship:
  - Winner (3): 1957, 1959, 1963
  - Runner-up (3): 1958, 1962, 1966
- National Hurling League:
  - Winner (1): 1963
  - Runner-up (2): 1959, 1961,

=== Munster ===
- Railway Cup:
  - Winner (5): 1955, 1958, 1959, 1960, 1961
  - Runner-up (2): 1956, 1962,
