= Mount Sion GAA =

Gaelic games club in County Waterford, Ireland

Mount Sion
- Cnoc Sion
- Founded: 1932
- County: Waterford
- Colours
- Grounds: Marian Park
- Coordinates: 52°15′39.84″N 7°08′01.90″W

Playing kits
Standard colours

Senior Club Championships
	All Ireland	Munster champions	Waterford champions
Football:	0	0	5
Hurling:	0	2	35

Mount Sion (Irish: Cnoc Sion) is a Gaelic Athletic Association club located in Waterford City, County Waterford, Ireland. It was founded by teachers in the school of the same name. Although technically separate from the school, the club still maintains a close relationship with the school, sharing the same sports facilities in the city.

The club fields teams in both the Waterford Hurling and Gaelic football championships and has had many famous players, including John Keane, Philly Grimes, Tony Browne and Ken McGrath.

The club is mainly concerned with the game of hurling and is the most successful in Waterford with 35 county title wins, although they did win 5 county football titles back in the 1950s. They have also won 2 Munster Senior Hurling titles, in 1981 with victory over Limerick club South Liberties (3-9 to 1–4) and in 2002 beating Sixmilebridge of Clare (0-12 to 0–10). The club has produced a number of All Star winning players for Waterford and also two Inter-county hurlers of the year, Tony Browne in 1998 and Austin Gleeson in 2016. John Keane was also selected on the hurling team of the millennium. Frankie Walsh was the last Waterford man to lift the Liam McCarthy cup in 1959.

Mount Sion won titles in 1994, 1998, 2000, 2002, 2003, 2004 and 2006 with players such a such Ken McGrath, Tony Browne, Brian Greene, Eoin Daniels, Eoin Kelly, and Eoin McGrath. Since 2006, Mount Sion are without a county final win and, while they reached the finals in 2014, 2022 and 2025, Ballygunner came out on top on each occasion.

== Notable players ==
- John Keane Member of Hurling Team of the Century.
- Andy Fleming 1948 All-Ireland Senior Hurling Championship winner.
- Paddy Dowling
- Vin Baston 1948 All-Ireland Senior Hurling Championship winner.
- Ian O’Regan
- Pat Fanning President of the Gaelic Athletic Association 1970-73.
- Austin Gleeson 2016 All Stars Hurler of the Year, 2016 GAA/GPA Young Hurler of the Year. All-Star winner.
- Phil Grimes Two time All-Ireland Senior Hurling Championship winner.
- Seamus Power 1959 All-Ireland Senior Hurling Championship winner.
- Mick Flannelly 1959 All-Ireland Senior Hurling Championship winner. 1948 All-Ireland Minor Hurling Championship winning captain.
- Martin Óg Morrissey 1959 All-Ireland Senior Hurling Championship winner.
- Fred O'Brien 1959 All-Ireland Senior Hurling Championship winner.
- Frankie Walsh 1959 All-Ireland Senior Hurling Championship winning captain.
- Larry Guinan 1959 All-Ireland Senior Hurling Championship winner.
- Jimmy Byrne
- Pat McGrath GAA Hall of Fame inductee.
- Jim Greene All-Star winner.
- Ken McGrath Three time All-Star winner.
- Tony Browne 1998 All Stars Hurler of the Year. Three time All-Star winner. 1992 All-Ireland Under-21 Hurling Championship winning captain.
- Eoin McGrath
- Brian Greene

== Honours ==
=== Hurling ===
- Munster Senior Club Hurling Championships: 2
  - 1981 and 2002
- Waterford Senior Hurling Championships: 35
  - 1938, 1939, 1940, 1943, 1945, 1948, 1949, 1951, 1953, 1954, 1955, 1956, 1957, 1958, 1959, 1960, 1961, 1963, 1964, 1965, 1969, 1972, 1974, 1975, 1981, 1983, 1986, 1988, 1994, 1998, 2000, 2002, 2003, 2004, 2006
- Waterford Junior A Hurling Championship: 1
  - 2026
- Waterford Junior Hurling Championships: 2
  - 1934, 2011
- Waterford Under-21 Hurling Championships: 7
  - 1973, 1974, 1985, 1991, 1994, 1995 and 1999.
- Waterford Minor Hurling Championships: 27
  - 1933, 1934, 1945, 1946, 1947, 1948, 1949, 1950, 1952, 1953, 1954, 1955, 1956, 1958, 1962, 1963, 1964, 1965, 1968, 1969, 1991, 1994, 1996, 1998, 1999, 2000 and 2008

=== Football ===
- Waterford Senior Football Championships: 5
  - 1953, 1955, 1956, 1959 and 1961
- Waterford Junior Football Championships: 6
  - 1939, 1948, 1990, 2013, 2018, 2021, 2025
- Waterford Minor Football Championships: 5
  - 1956, 1957 (as Na Risigh), 1958 (as Na Risigh), 1964 (as Na Risigh), 1973
- Waterford Minor 'B' Football Championships:
  - 1990, 2008, 2009,

Preceded by Ballygunner GAA	Waterford Senior Hurling Championship; 2006	Succeeded by Ballyduff GAA
