= Erin's Own GAA (Waterford) =

Irish GAA club

Erin's Own
- Rogha Éireann
- Founded: 1924
- County: Waterford
- Nickname: The Own
- Colours: Yellow and blue
- Grounds: Poleberry Park
- Coordinates: 52°15′04.39″N 7°06′45.36″W

Playing kits
Standard colours

Senior Club Championships
	All Ireland	Munster champions	Waterford champions
Hurling:	-	-	13

Erin's Own GAA is a Gaelic Athletic Association club based in Waterford City, Ireland. The club enters teams in both GAA codes each year, which includes two adult hurling teams and two adult Gaelic football team in the Waterford County Championships.

The club has won the County Senior Hurling Championship a total of 13 times making it the second most successful club in the county. The club has also achieved 8 championships in a row between 1927 and 1935.

It is the oldest club in Waterford City and is third on the Waterford Senior Hurling Championship roll of honour (13 - including one 9 in-a-row).

For underage competitions up to Under-16, the club is known as Sacred Heart. Matches conducted by Sacred Heart are held in a community pitch in Killure, St. John's park.

== Honours ==
- Waterford Senior Hurling Championships: 13
  - 1927, 1928, 1929, 1930, 1931, 1932, 1933, 1934, 1935, 1942, 1946, 1947, and 1962
- Waterford Intermediate Hurling Championships: 2
  - 1994, 1997
- Waterford Under 21 Hurling Championships: 2
  - 1968, 1974
- Waterford Minor Hurling Championships: 5
  - 1968, 1974, 1982, 2010, 2013
- Waterford Junior Hurling Championships: 2
  - 1929, 1931
- Waterford Intermediate Football Championships: 1
  - 1964
- Waterford Junior Football Championships: 1
  - 1930
