= 1956 All-Ireland Senior Football Championship final =

- Event: 1956 All-Ireland Senior Football Championship
Galway	Cork
2–13 (19)	3–7 (16)
- Date: 7 October 1956
- Venue: Croke Park, Dublin
- Referee: Peter McDermott (Meath)
- Attendance: 70,772

The 1956 All-Ireland Senior Football Championship final was a Gaelic football match played at Croke Park on 7 October 1956 to determine the winners of the 1956 All-Ireland Senior Football Championship, the 70th season of the All-Ireland Senior Football Championship. The tournament was organised by the Gaelic Athletic Association for the champions of the four provinces of Ireland. The final was contested by Cork of Munster and Galway of Connacht, with Galway winning by 2–13 to 3–7.

The All-Ireland final between Galway and Cork was their first championship meeting since the 1945 All-Ireland semi-final when Cork triumphed by 2–12 to 2–8. An outbreak of polio in Cork led to the game, like its hurling counterpart the previous month, being postponed by the Central Council of the GAA following a request from public health officials in Dublin, who were worried by the prospect of large numbers of Cork people descending on the city.

== Match ==
=== Summary ===
The game itself was described as one of the best finals yet. After some end to end action, Gerry Kirwan pointed for Galway, then Frank Stockwell punched the ball over the bar for another. A few minutes later Stockwell soloed through the defence and pointed again. Cork levelled the score but then Seán Purcell took a sideline kick and floated the ball into the square. Billy O'Neill jumped high and palmed the ball to Stockwell who was running towards goal, and he forced the ball into the net. Again Cork fought back to get within a point of Galway, but then Purcell received a pass from Jackie Coyle out on the wing. As soon as he saw this Frank Stockwell was off and running, leaving his marker behind. Purcell expertly flighted the ball into his hands and he buried it in the net. By half time Galway were leading by 2–6 to 0–6.

Galway went eight points clear before Cork staged one of the most remarkable comebacks in All-Ireland final history. Two quick goals from Johnny Creedon and Denis "Toots" Kelleher put them right back in contention. Galway then scored two points but Cork got a third goal from Kelleher which left them just a point behind, however, Galway fought back. First Purcell pointed a free, and then seconds later took a sideline kick and, with great accuracy, found Stockwell who swivelled around and put the ball over the bar.

Galway's All-Ireland victory was their first since 1938. The win gave them their fourth All-Ireland title over all and put them joint fifth on the all-time roll of honour along with Kildare and Tipperary.

Cork's All-Ireland defeat was their first since 1907. Defeat at the hands of Galway was the first of back-to-back All-Ireland defeats for Cork.

For Billy O'Neill the victory was bittersweet. Although playing for Galway he was a native of Carrigtwohill, County Cork, and claimed a winners' medal at the expense of his own county.

Due to the similarity of the colour of their jerseys a change was necessary. Galway wore the all white strip of Connacht, while Cork wore the blue of Munster.

=== Details ===
7 October 1956
15:15 IST

Cork	3–7 - 2–13	Galway
D. Gallagher (0-1), N. Fitzgerald (0-5), T. Furlong (1-0) & N. Duggan (0-2).		F. Stockwell (2-5), S. Purcell (0-3), G. Kirwan & J. Coyle (0-2) & F. Evers (0-1).

Croke Park, Dublin
Attendance: 70,772
Referee: Peter McDermott (Meath)

Cork	Galway

==== Galway ====
- 1 J. Mangan (c)
- 2 S. Keeley
- 3 G. Daly
- 4 T. Dillon
- 5 J. Kissane
- 6 J. Mahon
- 7 M. Greally
- 8 F. Evers
- 9 M. McDonagh
- 10 J. Coyle
- 11 S. Purcell
- 12 B. O'Neill
- 13 J. Young
- 14 F. Stockwell
- 15 G. Kirwan

Sub used
A. Swords for J. Young

==== Cork ====
- 1 P. Tyers
- 2 P. O'Driscoll
- 3 D. O'Sullivan (c)
- 4 D. Murray
- 5 P. Harrington
- 6 D. Bernard
- 7 M. Goold
- 8 S. Moore
- 9 E. Ryan
- 10 D. Kelleher
- 11 N. Duggan
- 12 Paddy Murphy
- 13 T. Furlong
- 14 N. FitzGerald
- 15 J. Creedon

Subs used
18 É. Goulding for P. Murphy

Subs not used
16 Pete Murphy
17 B. O'Sullivan
19 D. O'Sullivan
20 L. Power

== See also ==
- 1918 All-Ireland Senior Football Championship final, also postponed due to an outbreak of infectious disease
- 2021 All-Ireland Senior Football Championship final, also postponed due to an outbreak of infectious disease
