= 1957 All-Ireland Senior Football Championship final =

- Event: 1957 All-Ireland Senior Football Championship
Louth	Cork
1-9 (12)	1-7 (10)
- Date: 22 September 1957
- Venue: Croke Park, Dublin
- Referee: Patsy Geraghty (Galway)
- Attendance: 72,732

The 1957 All-Ireland Senior Football Championship final was a Gaelic football match played at Croke Park on 22 September 1957 to determine the winners of the 1957 All-Ireland Senior Football Championship, the 71st season of the All-Ireland Senior Football Championship, a tournament organised by the Gaelic Athletic Association for the champions of the four provinces of Ireland. The final was contested by Cork of Munster and Louth of Leinster, with Louth winning by 1-9 to 1-7.

The All-Ireland final between Cork and Louth was a unique occasion as it was the first ever championship meeting between the two teams. Similarly, the game was billed as a David and Goliath battle as it pitted Ireland's biggest county against Ireland's smallest county.

Louth's All-Ireland victory was their first since 1912. The win gave them their third All-Ireland title over all and put them joint eighth on the all-time roll of honour along with Mayo and Cork. It remains their last All-Ireland final appearance.

Cork's All-Ireland defeat was their second in succession after losing to Galway in 1956. It was their ninth All-Ireland final defeat in total.

== Match ==
Due to the identical nature of the colour of their jerseys a change was necessary. Louth wore the green of Leinster while Cork wore the blue of Munster.

In the first half it was the Louth team who had the balance of play in the early stages. They built up a lead of 0-5 to 0-3 after just twenty minutes. Shortly after, Cork took the lead when Tommy Furlong beat the advancing Louth goalkeeper to a centre from Nealie Duggan and punched to the net. Niall FitzGerald added a point before the interval.

On the resumption Denis "Toots" Kelleher extended Cork's lead with another point and it looked as if the Rebels were on their way. Louth again took up the running and scored four points in succession to regain the lead with ten minutes remaining. Two points from Kelleher put Cork back in front - then came the decisive moment of the match. In the 26th minute of the second half, a line ball delivered high into the Cork goalmouth by Kevin Beahan hit the back of the net after a tussle between Louth forward Seán Cunningham and Cork corner-back Dan Murray. Despite frantic efforts by Cork they couldn't claw back Louth's lead. Twice it seemed a goal was imminent, however, Louth held on for their two-point victory.

=== Details ===
22 September 1957
15:15 IST

Cork	1–7 – 1–9	Louth
(HT: 1–4 – 0–5)
Gls: Tommy Furlong; Pts: Denis Kelleher (0-3), Eric Ryan (0-2), Niall FitzGerald (0-1), Nealie Duggan (0-1)		Gls: Seán Cunningham; Pts: Kevin Beahan (0-3), Jim Roe (0-3) Seán Cunningham (0-1), Séamus O'Donnell (0-1), Dan O'Neill (0-1)

Cork	Louth

GK	1	Liam Power (Mitchelstown)
RCB	2	Mick Goold (Macroom)
FB	3	Denis Bernard (Dohenys)
LCB	4	Dan Murray (UCC)
RHB	5	Paddy Harrington (Garda, Dublin)
CHB	6	Paddy O'Driscoll (Garda)
LHB	7	J. J. Hinchion (Canovee)
MF	8	Eric Ryan (Garda)
MF	9	Seán Moore (Glenview)
RHF	10	Joe O'Sullivan (Beara)
CHF	11	Niall FitzGerald (Collins)
LHF	12	Tommy Furlong (St Michael's)
RCF	13	Éamonn Goulding (St Nicholas)
FF	14	Nealie Duggan (Lees) (c)
LCF	15	Denis Kelleher (Millstreet)
Substitutes:
	16	Finbarr McAuliffe (South Kerry) for Joe O'Sullivan
	17	Tim O'Callaghan (Macroom)
	18	Donal O'Sullivan (Lees)
	19	Mick McCarthy (St Finbarr's)
	20	Colm O'Shea (Clanna Gael, Dublin)
Manager:
Éamonn Young

GK	1	Seán Óg Flood (Dundalk Young Irelands)
RCB	2	Ollie Reilly (Hunterstown Rovers)
FB	3	Tom Conlon (Stabannon Parnells)
LCB	4	Jim Meehan (Naomh Mhuire)
RHB	5	Patsy Coleman (St Mary's)
CHB	6	Peadar Smith (Oliver Plunketts)
LHB	7	Stephen White (Dundalk Young Irelands)
MF	8	Kevin Beahan (Seán McDermotts, Dublin)
MF	9	Dan O'Neill (St Dominic's)
RHF	10	Séamus O'Donnell (Cooley Kickhams)
CHF	11	Dermot O'Brien (St Mary's) (c)
LHF	12	Frank Lynch (Geraldines)
RCF	13	Seán Cunningham (Dundalk Young Irelands)
FF	14	Jimmy McDonnell (Darver Volunteers)
LCF	15	Jim Roe (St Mary's)
Substitutes:
	16	Barney McCoy (St Mary's)
	17	Alfie Monk (Naomh Mhuire)
	18	Jackie Reynolds (Oliver Plunketts)
	19	Jim McArdle (Roche Emmets)
	20	Jim Judge (Newtown Blues)
	21	Aidan Magennis (St Mary's)
	22	Michael Flood (Dundalk Young Irelands)
Manager:
Jim Quigley
