= 1959 All-Ireland Senior Football Championship final =

- Event: 1959 All-Ireland Senior Football Championship
Kerry	Galway
3–7 (16)	1–4 (7)
- Date: 27 September 1959
- Venue: Croke Park, Dublin
- Referee: John Dowling (Offaly)
- Attendance: 85,897

The 1959 All-Ireland Senior Football Championship final was the 72nd All-Ireland Final and the deciding match of the 1959 All-Ireland Senior Football Championship, an inter-county Gaelic football tournament for the top teams in Ireland.

== Match ==
This year's final was played on 27 September.

=== Summary ===
Kerry won easily with goals by Dan McAuliffe (2) and Garry McMahon.

It was the third of three All-Ireland football titles won by Kerry in the 1950s.

Galway were beaten by Kerry.

=== Details ===
27 September 1959
Final

Kerry	3–7 – 1–4	Galway
Mick O'Dwyer (0–1), Dan McAuliffe (2–2), John Dowling (0–2), Tadhgie Lyne (0–2).		Sean Purcell (0–3), Frank Evers (1–0) & Joe Young (0–1).

Croke Park, Dublin
Attendance: 85,897
Referee: J. Dowling (Offaly)

Kerry
Galway

==== Kerry ====
- 1 J. Culloty
- 2 J. O'Shea
- 3 N. Sheehy
- 4 T. Lyons
- 5 Seán Murphy
- 6 K. Coffey
- 7 M. O'Dwyer
- 8 Mick O'Connell (c)
- 9 Séamus Murphy
- 10 D. McAuliffe
- 11 T. Long
- 12 P. Sheehy
- 13 D. Geaney
- 14 John Dowling
- 15 T. Lyne

Subs used
Jack Dowling for T. Lyons
Moss O'Connell for Mick O'Connell
G. McMahon for D. Geaney

==== Galway ====
- 1 J. Farrell
- 2 J. Kissane
- 3 S. Meade
- 4 M. Greally
- 5 M. Garrett
- 6 J. Mahon
- 7 S. Colleran
- 8 F. Evers
- 9 M. McDonagh
- 10 J. Young
- 11 S. Purcell (c)
- 12 M. McDonagh
- 13 M. Laide
- 14 F. Stockwell
- 15 J. Nallen

Subs used
J. Keeley for J. Nallen
P. Dunne for M. Greally
