= Tommy Furlong =

Irish Gaelic footballer and hurler (1931–2019)

Personal information
- Native name: Tomás Furong (Irish)
- Born: 1931 Blackrock, Cork, Ireland
- Died: 16 August 2019 (aged 88) Ballincollig, Cork, Ireland
- Occupation: Post office worker
- Height: 5 ft 11 in (180 cm)

Sport
- Sport: Gaelic Football
- Position: Right corner-forward
Clubs
- Years: Club
- Blackrock; St Michael's; Ballinure
Club titles
	Football	Hurling
Cork titles	0	1
Inter-county
Years	County	Apps (scores)
1956-1961	Cork	14 (8-10)
Inter-county titles
- Munster titles: 2
- All-Irelands: 0
- NFL: 1

Thomas Furlong (1931 – 16 August 2019) was an Irish Gaelic footballer and hurler who played for club sides Blackrock, St Michael's and Ballinure, at inter-county level with the Cork senior football team and with Munster. He usually lined out in the forwards.

== Career ==
Furlong first came to Gaelic football prominence when he was added to the Cork junior team in 1953. He won a Munster Junior Championship medal that year before later collecting an All-Ireland medal after a defeat of Lancashire. Furlong won a second set or provincial and All-Ireland junior medals in 1955. This success saw him drafted onto the Cork senior team the following year and he won National League and Munster Championship medals in his debut season, however, Cork suffered defeat by Galway in the All-Ireland final. In spite of this, Furlong ended the year with club success by winning a County Junior Championship medal with St. Michael's and a County Senior CHampionship medal with Blackrock. He won a second senior provincial medal with Cork in 1957, however, the ultimate success once again eluded him as Cork were defeated by Louth in the 1957 All-Ireland final. Furlong, who also lined out with the Cork senior hurling team, also earned inclusion on the Munster team. He ended his club career playing with Ballinure.

== Death ==
Furlong died in a nursing home in Ballincollig on 16 August 2019.

== Honours ==
St Michael's

- Cork Junior Football Championship: 1956

Blackrock

- Cork Senior Hurling Championship: 1956

Cork

- Munster Senior Football Championship: 1956, 1957
- National Football League: 1955-56
- All-Ireland Junior Football Championship: 1953, 1955
- Munster Junior Football Championship: 1953, 1955
