= Liam Power =

Irish Gaelic footballer (1934–1998)

Liam Powers
Personal information
- Native name: Liam de Paor (Irish)
- Born: 1934 Manchester, New Hamspire, Ireland
- Died: July 5, 1998 (aged 63–64) Killarney, County Kerry, Ireland
- Occupation: Footballer

Sport
- Sport: Gaelic Football
Clubs
- Years: Club
- Mitchelstown → Avondhu
Club titles
- Cork titles: 0
Inter-county titles
- Munster titles: 2
- All-Irelands: 0
- NFL: 1

Liam Power (1934 – 5 July 1998) was an Irish Gaelic footballer. He played with club side Mitchelstown, divisional side Avondhu and was also a member of the Cork senior football team.

== Playing career ==
Power first played Gaelic football as a student at Mitchelstown CBS before joining the Blackthorns club side in the late 1940s. He progressed to adult level with Mitchelstown and won seven North Cork JFC titles in a ten-year period between 1951 and 1961, including two as team captain in 1956 and 1957. Power won a Cork JFC title in 1961. He also lined out with the Avondhu divisional team between 1955 and 1960

Power first played for Cork as goalkeeper with the junior team that beat Warwickshire in the 1955 All-Ireland junior final. This success earned an immediate call-up to the senior team and he was goalkeeping understudy to Pádraig Tyers for Cork's defeat by Galway in the 1956 All-Ireland final. Power became first-choice goalkeeper the following year and, after winning a second successive Munster SFC, suffered a second successive defeat in an All-Ireland final. His performances for Cork also earned inclusion on the Munster team in the Railway Cup.

== Death ==
Power died after suffering a heart attack while attending the 1998 Munster final on 5 July 1998.

== Honours ==
Mitchelstown

- Cork Junior Football Championship: 1961
- North Cork Junior A Football Championship: 1951, 1955, 1956 (c), 1957 (c), 1958, 1960, 1961

Cork

- Munster Senior Football Championship: 1956, 1957
- National Football League: 1955-56
- All-Ireland Junior Football Championship: 1955
- Munster Junior Football Championship: 1955
