= Paddy Murphy (Gaelic footballer) =

Irish Gaelic footballer (1934–2023)

Personal information
- Native name: Pádraig Ó Murchú (Irish)
- Born: 1934 Dromtarriffe, County Cork, Ireland
- Died: 30 December 2023 (aged 89) Kilkenny, Ireland
- Occupation: Roman Catholic priest
- Height: 5 ft 9 in (175 cm)

Sport
- Sport: Gaelic Football
- Position: Left wing-forward
Club
- Years: Club
- 1951–1960: Dromtarriffe
Club titles
- Cork titles: 0
College
- Years: College
- University College Cork
College titles
- Sigerson titles: 0
Inter-county
Years	County	Apps (scores)
1955–1956	Cork	5
Inter-county titles
- Munster titles: 1
- All-Irelands: 0
- NFL: 1

Patrick Murphy (1934 – 30 December 2023) was an Irish Gaelic footballer. He played at club level with Dromtarriffe, divisional side Duhallow and at inter-county level with the Cork senior football team.

== Career ==
Murphy first played Gaelic football at club level with Dromtarriffe. He won three Duhallow JFC titles between 1953 ad 1956, before claiming a Cork JFC medal after a defeat of Dohenys in 1959. Murphy had earlier lined out with University College Cork in the Sigerson Cup, while he also earned selection on the Duhallow divisional team.

Murphy first played for Cork as a member of the minor team in 1952. He was an unused substitute when the team won that year's Munster MFC title. Murphy later progressed to the Cork junior team and won an All-Ireland JFC medal following Cork's defeat of Warwickshire in the 1955 All-Ireland JFC final. This victory resulted in his inclusion on the senior team during their successful 1955–56 National League campaign. Murphy later claimed a Munster SFC medal after a defeat of Kerry, however, Cork were later beaten by Galway in the 1956 All-Ireland SFC final.

== Personal life and death ==
Murphy studied agricultural science at University College Cork before embarking on a religious life as a Franciscan Missionary in Zambia. He died at St. Luke's General Hospital in Kilkenny, on 30 December 2023, aged 89.

== Honours ==
Dromtarriffe

- Cork Junior Football Championship: 1959
- Duhallow Junior Football Championship: 1953, 1956, 1959

Cork

- Munster Senior Football Championship: 1956
- National Football League: 1955–56
- All-Ireland Junior Football Championship: 1955
- Munster Junior Football Championship: 1955
- Munster Minor Football Championship: 1952
