= Éamonn Goulding =

Irish hurler and Gaelic footballer

Personal information
- Native name: Éamonn de Gúl (Irish)
- Born: 1934 Blackpool, Cork, Ireland
- Died: 16 January 1995 (aged 60) Newbridge, County Kildare, Ireland
- Occupations: Army officer and bank official
- Height: 5 ft 7 in (170 cm)

Sport
- Football Position: Right corner-forward
- Hurling Position: Full-forward
Clubs
Years	Club	Apps (scores)
1953-1961 1953-1961	Glen Rovers; St. Nicholas'	25 (2-27)
Club titles
	Football	Hurling
Cork titles	0	5
Inter-county*
Years	County	Apps (scores)
1954-1958 1954-1960	Cork (SF); Cork (SH)	8 (0-07); 13 (2-10)
Inter-county titles
	Football	Hurling
Munster Titles	2	2
All-Ireland Titles	0	1
League titles	0	0
- *Inter County team apps and scores correct as of 21:58, 15 April 2015.

Edward J. Goulding (1934 - January 17, 1995), known as Éamonn Goulding, was an Irish hurler and Gaelic footballer. At club he level he played with Glen Rovers and St. Nicholas' and was a member of the Cork senior teams as a dual player.

== Early life ==
Born and raised in Blackpool, Cork, Goulding first played as a schoolboy in various juvenile competitions before later lining out as a student at the North Monastery. He enjoyed some success, winning the Dr. Browne and Dr. O'Callaghan Cups in 1951, however, he ended his schoolboy career without a Harty Cup or Corn Uí Mhuirí title.

== Club career ==
Goulding's club career began at juvenile and underage levels as a hurler with Glen Rovers and as a Gaelic footballer with sister club St. Nicholas'. He won three successive Cork MHC titles with the Glen from 1950 to 1952, while he also claimed consecutive Cork MFC titles with St. Nick's during the same period.

Goulding was just out of the minor grade when he made his senior debut in both codes in 1953. He ended the 1953 Cork SHC with a winners' medal after scoring 1-02 against Sarsfields in the final. It was the first of successive titles for Goulding as he also featured on the Glen Rovers team that beat Blackrock in the 1954 final. Army commitments resulted in him missing St. Nick's subsequent 1954 Cork SFC final victory.

In 1956, Goulding captained the Glen Rovers intermediate team to a defeat of Carrigaline in the final. He soon returned to the senior team and claimed a third winners' medal in that grade after a defeat of St. Finbarr's in the 1958 final. It was the first of three successive titles for Goulding after further defeats of Blackrock in 1959 and University College Cork in 1960.

== Inter-county career ==
Goulding began his inter-county career when he was added to the Cork minor hurling team for the 1951 Munster MHC. After claiming the provincial title, he ended the season with an All-Ireland medal after a defeat of Galway in the 1951 All-Ireland minor final. Goulding was a dual minor the following season and added a Munster MFC medal to his collection after a defeat of Clare in the 1952 Munster minor final.

Goulding first appeared at adult inter-county level when he was drafted onto the Cork junior football team for the latter stages of the 1953 All-Ireland JFC. He ended the season with a winners' medal after a defeat of Lancashire in the 1953 All-Ireland junior final. Goulding was drafted onto the Cork senior hurling team for the latter stages of the 1953-54 National League and subsequently scored 1-02 in his championship debut against Waterford in the 1954 Munster SHC semi-final. After missing the Munster SHC final win over Tipperary, he was back at full-forward for Cork's 1-09 to 1-06 defeat of Wexford in the 1954 All-Ireland SHC final.

Goulding was absent for Cork's 1956 Munster SHC campaign returned to the starting fifteen at midfield for the 1956 All-Ireland SHC final defeat by Wexford. Two weeks later, Goulding came on as a substitute when the Cork senior football team were beaten by Galway in the 1956 All-Ireland SFC final. He scored five points in the defeat of Waterford in the 1957 Munster SFC final, however, Cork suffered a second consecutive All-Ireland SFC final defeat when they lost to Louth by two points. Goulding continued to line out with the Cork senior football team until 1958 and retired from senior inter-county hurling in 1960.

== Personal life and death ==
Goulding joined the Cadets in 1953 and was commissioned into the Irish Army in November 1955. He served with the Eastern Command and was attached to the Military College in the Curragh Camp before leaving the army in June 1984. Goulding later worked as manager of the Irish Nationwide Building Society in Kilkenny.

Goulding died suddenly while he was attending a funeral in Newbridge, County Kildare aged 60, on January 17, 1995.

== Honours ==
North Monastery

- Dr. O'Callaghan Cup: 1951
- Dr. Browne Cup: 1951

St. Nicholas'

- Cork Minor Football Championship: 1951, 1952

Glen Rovers

- Cork Senior Hurling Championship: 1953, 1954, 1958, 1959, 1960
- Cork Intermediate Hurling Championship: 1956 (c)
- Cork Minor Hurling Championship: 1950, 1951, 1952

Cork

- All-Ireland Senior Hurling Championship: 1954
- Munster Senior Hurling Championship: 1954, 1956
- Munster Senior Football Championship: 1956, 1957
- All-Ireland Junior Football Championship: 1953
- Munster Junior Football Championship: 1953
- All-Ireland Minor Hurling Championship: 1951
- Munster Minor Hurling Championship: 1951
- Munster Minor Football Championship: 1952
