= Johnny Creedon =

Irish Gaelic footballer

Personal information
- Native name: Seán Ó Críodáin (Irish)
- Born: 1932 Macroom, County Cork, Ireland
- Died: 29 March 2019 (aged 86) Wilton, Cork, Ireland
- Occupation: Publican
- Height: 5 ft 9 in (175 cm)

Sport
- Sport: Gaelic Football
- Position: Left corner-forward
Club
- Years: Club
- Macroom
Club titles
- Cork titles: 0
Inter-county*
Years	County	Apps (scores)
1954-1957	Cork	9 (2-07)
Inter-county titles
- Munster titles: 1
- All-Irelands: 0
- NFL: 1
- *Inter County team apps and scores correct as of 14:40, 12 April 2012.

John Creedon (1932 – 29 March 2019) was an Irish Gaelic footballer. At club level he played with Macroom and was also a member of the Cork senior football team.

== Career ==
Creedon first played Gaelic football with Macroom, however, his career coincided with a barren spell for the club in terms of success. He also lined out with the nearby Clondrohid club.

Creedon first played for Cork as a member of the minor team in 1950. He later joined the junior team and was at full-forward when Cork beat Lancashire in the 1953 All-Ireland junior final. This success earned Creedon an immediate call-up to the senior team. He won a National League title in 1956 before winning a Munster SFC title later that season. The ultimate success eluded Creedon as Cork were beaten by Galway in the 1956 All-Ireland final. His performances for Cork also earned inclusion on the Munster team in the Railway Cup. Creedon's emigration brought a sudden end to his Cork career in 1957, however, he later lined out with the New York team.

== Personal life and death ==
Creedon initially worked as a cabinet maker before spending 13 years in New York City. After returning in 1970 he ran the Halfway House pub just outside Macroom.

Creedon died at the Cork University Hospital on 29 March 2019, aged 86.

== Honours ==
Cork

- Munster Senior Football Championship: 1956
- National Football League: 1955-56
- All-Ireland Junior Football Championship: 1953
- Munster Junior Football Championship: 1953
