= Dan Murray (Gaelic footballer) =

Cork Gaelic footballer and hurler (1934–2025)

Personal information
- Native name: Dónall Ó Muirí (Irish)
- Born: 1934 Kilmichael, County Cork, Ireland
- Died: 6 April 2025 (aged 90–91) Bishopstown, Cork, Ireland
- Occupation: Secondary school principal
- Height: 5 ft 8 in (173 cm)

Sport
- Sport: Gaelic football
- Position: Right corner-back
Clubs
- Years: Club
- 1952–1953 1954–1956 1957–1964: Canovee; Darrara College; Macroom
Club titles
- Cork titles: 2
College
- Years: College
- University College Cork
Inter-county*
Years	County	Apps (scores)
1952–1959	Cork	15 (0–0)
Inter-county titles
- Munster titles: 2
- All-Irelands: 0
- NFL: 1
- *Inter County team apps and scores correct as of 14:40, 12 April 2012.

Daniel Murray (1934 – 6 April 2025) was an Irish Gaelic footballer who played as a right corner-back for the Cork senior team.

Murray joined the team during the 1954 championship and was a regular member of the starting fifteen until his retirement after the 1959 championship. During that time he won one National League medal and two Munster SFC medals; however, he did not win an All-Ireland SFC medal.

Murray began his club career with Canovee and UCC, before later winning two county championship medals with Macroom. He also played hurling with Cloughduv.

Murray died on 6 April 2025.

== Honours ==
Darrara College

- South West Junior A Football Championship: 1954, 1955

Macroom

- Cork Senior Football Championship: 1958, 1962

Cork

- Munster Senior Football Championship: 1956, 1957
- National Football League: 1955–56
- All-Ireland Junior Football Championship: 1953
- Munster Junior Football Championship: 1953
- Munster Minor Football Championship: 1952
