= St Patrick's Primary School, Tuam =

School in Tuam, Ireland

St Patrick's P.S. is an all-boys senior primary school in Tuam, County Galway, Ireland. It is situated on the Dublin Road. The school can trace its history back to 1816 but only became St. Patrick's in 1989. It is a senior boys' primary school and is very closely linked with neighbouring sister schools, Mercy and Presentation primary schools.

== Notable alumni ==
- Davy Carton, musician
- Mike Cooley, trade unionist
- Ja Fallon, Gaelic footballer
- Rory Gaffney, soccer player
- Colm Keaveney, former T.D.
- Finian McGrath, T.D.
- Leo Moran, musician
- Tom Murphy, playwright
- Brendan Murray singer
- Seán Purcell, Gaelic footballer
- Frank Stockwell, Gaelic footballer
