= Jarlath Fallon =

Galway Gaelic footballer

Personal information
- Native name: Iarlaith Ó Fallúin (Irish)
- Nickname: Jas the man
- Born: 1973 (age 52–53) Galway, Ireland
- Occupation: Postman
- Height: 6" 1

Sport
- Sport: Gaelic football
- Position: Centre forward
Club
- Years: Club
- Tuam Stars
Club titles
- Galway titles: 1
- Connacht titles: 1
Inter-county
- Years: County
- 1992–2003 2006–2007: Galway; Galway
Inter-county titles
- Connacht titles: 5
- All-Irelands: 2
- All Stars: 2

Jarlath "Ja" Fallon (born 1973) is a former Gaelic footballer who played for the Tuam Stars club and at senior level for the Galway county team. He is regarded as one of the finest players to come from Tuam since Seán Purcell and Frank Stockwell. He was an integral part of the Galway county football team from 1995 to 2005, winning All Stars footballer of the year in 1998.

Fallon was born in Tuam and played Gaelic football in primary school at St Patrick's and in secondary school with St Jarlath's College, both in Tuam.

He began his inter-county career with Galway in 1991, having already established himself with his local team Tuam Stars.

He became captain of the county team after Tuam Stars won the 1994 Galway Senior Football Championship.

He led Galway to the 1995 Connacht Senior Football Championship but lost out to the Peter Canavan-inspired Tyrone on a scoreline of 1-13 to 0-13 in the semi-finals of the All-Ireland Senior Football Championship. Galway failed to build on their success of that year in 1996 and 1997, but things turned around when John O'Mahony was appointed manager in August 1997.

Galway won the 1998 All-Ireland SFC title, with Fallon playing a pivotal role in bringing the Sam Maguire Cup back to Galway for the first time since 1966, with notable individual performances in the Connacht SFC final replay against Roscommon, the semi-final against Derry and his second-half performance in the final against Kildare, in which Galway came from behind at half-time to win by 1-14 to 1-10. He deservedly won Footballer Of The Year that year. Galway failed to defend their title the following year after losing to fierce rivals Mayo in the Connacht SFC final at Tuam stadium.

Fallon sustained a cruciate ligament injury in a club game versus UCG in Caherlistrane in 2000. His loss was felt by the Galway team against Kerry in the All-Ireland SFC final that year, which Kerry won.

Fallon returned to the Galway set-up in 2001 and, made an impact as Galway, despite losing to Roscommon in the Connacht SFC second round, reached the All-Ireland SFC final for the third time in four years, a game in which they outclassed Meath on a scoreline of 0-17 to 0-08. Galway reached the quarter-final stage of the 2002 All-Ireland SFC but lost to Kerry. In 2003, they reached the same stage again but lost to Donegal after a replay.

After the game, Fallon announced his retirement from inter-county football. In 2004, newly appointed county manager Peter Ford, chose Fallon as one of his three selectors on the Galway backroom staff.

In 2006, Fallon's fine form for Tuam Stars prompted him to come out of Inter-County retirement and play for Galway again. However, his fairytale return was short-lived, as he lasted less than 20 minutes in Galway's 5th-round defeat to Westmeath, suffering a broken-collarbone.

After a disappointing Championship season for Galway in 2007, Ja decided to retire from Inter-county football for the final time, to allow younger players to make a name for themselves. He continues to play club football with Tuam Stars.

In March 2013, he was profiled on the TG4 television programme Laochra Gael.

In May 2020, the Irish Independent named Fallon as one of the "dozens of brilliant players" who narrowly missed selection for its "Top 20 footballers in Ireland over the past 50 years".

Preceded by Maurice Fitzgerald	All Stars Footballer of the Year; 1998	Succeeded by Trevor Giles
