= Tom Dillon (Gaelic footballer) =

Irish Gaelic footballer (1926–2019)

Personal information
- Native name: Tomás Diolún (Irish)
- Nickname: Pook
- Born: 1926 Ahascragh, County Galway, Ireland
- Died: 18 June 2019 (aged 93) Aughrim, County Galway, Ireland
- Occupation: Farmer
- Height: 5 ft 11 in (180 cm)

Sport
- Sport: Gaelic football
- Position: Left corner-back
Clubs
- Years: Club
- Ahascragh; Westerns; Ballinasloe
Club titles
- Galway titles: 0
Inter-county
- Years: County
- 1948–1958: Galway
Inter-county titles
- Connacht titles: 4
- All-Irelands: 1
- NFL: 1

Thomas Dillon (1926 – 18 June 2019) was an Irish Gaelic footballer who predominantly played for Galway Championship club Ahascragh. He played for the Galway senior football team for ten seasons. Dillon usually lined out as a centre-back before ending his career at left corner-back.

Dillon began his football career at club level with Ahascragh. While working in Dublin he joined the Westerns club with whom he won a Dublin Senior League title. Dillon later lined out with Ballinasloe in the Galway Senior Championship before returning to Ahascragh where he served as club president.

At inter-county level, Dillon was part of the Galway junior team that won the Connacht Junior Football Championship in 1948. He also joined the Galway senior team for the 1948 season. From his debut, Dillon played as a centre-back and later as a corner-back and made a number of National League and Championship appearances in a career that ended with his last game in the 1958 All-Ireland Senior Football Championship. During that time he was part of Galway's All-Ireland Championship-winning team in the 1956 season. Dillon also secured four Connacht Championship medals and a National Football League medal.

At inter-provincial level, Dillon was selected to play in a number of championship campaigns with Connacht and won back-to-back Railway Cup medals in 1957 and 1958. He was also selected for the Rest of Ireland team.

== Honours ==
Galway

- All-Ireland Senior Football Championship (1): 1956
- Connacht Senior Football Championship (): 1954, 1956, 1957, 1958
- National Football League (1): 1956–57
- Connacht Junior Football Championship (1): 1948

Connacht

- Railway Cup (2): 1957, 1958
