= Denis Bernard (Gaelic footballer) =

Irish Gaelic footballer (1932–2019)

Personal information
- Native name: Donncha Ó Bearnáin (Irish)
- Born: 29 November 1932 Dunmanway, County Cork, Ireland
- Died: 31 October 2019 (aged 86) Trinity, Florida, United States
- Occupation: Accountant
- Height: 6 ft 0 in (183 cm)

Sport
- Sport: Gaelic Football
- Position: Centre-back
Club
- Years: Club
- Dohenys
Club titles
- Cork titles: 0
College
- Years: College
- University College Cork
College titles
- Sigerson titles: 2
Inter-county*
| Years | County | Apps (scores) |
| 1951-1957 | Cork | 16 (0-00) |
Inter-county titles
- Munster titles: 3
- All-Irelands: 0
- NFL: 2
- *Inter County team apps and scores correct as of 01:28, 12 April 2012.

Denis A. Bernard (29 November 1932 – 31 October 2019) was an Irish Gaelic footballer who played for club side Dohenys, at inter-county level with the Cork senior football team and with Munster. He usually lined out at full-back or centre-back.

== Career ==
Having played little Gaelic football at Rockwell College, Bernard first came to prominence at underage level with the Dohenys club. He was just 16-years-old when he was drafted onto the Cork minor team, but enjoyed to unsuccessful seasons. Bernard immediately joined the Cork junior team and was centre-back on the All-Ireland-winning team in 1951. This success saw him drafted onto the senior team and he won National League and Munster Championship medals in his debut season. This time also saw him win consecutive Sigerson Cup titles with University College Cork. Bernard enjoyed further inter-county success throughout the 1956-57 seasons, winning a second National League medal and consecutive Munster Championship medals. The ultimate success eluded him as Cork suffered back-to-back All-Ireland final defeats to Galway and Louth. Bernard was also a regular on the Munster team and he also won several divisional championship titles with Dohenys.

== Personal life and death ==
Bernard graduated as an accountant from University College Cork and emigrated to the United States in the late 1950s. He settled in Yonkers, New York before retiring to Florida. Bernard died on 31 October 2019.

== Honours ==
University College Cork

- Sigerson Cup: 1952, 1953

Dohenys

- South West Junior A Football Championship: 1956, 1957

Cork

- Munster Senior Football Championship: 1952, 1956, 1957
- National Football League: 1951-52, 1955-56
- All-Ireland Junior Football Championship: 1951
- Munster Junior Football Championship: 1951
