= Kissane (surname) =

Kissane is an Irish surname, particularly associated with County Kerry. It originates as an anglicisation of the Irish surname Ó Cíosáin, which was also anglicised as Cashman–the anglicisation of Kissane is more popular in County Kerry, while Cashman is more popular in County Cork.

Notable people with the surname Kissane include:

- Andy Kissane (born 1959), Australian poet and novelist
- David Kissane (born 1951), Australian psychiatrist
- Eamon Kissane (1899-1979), Irish politician
- Edward Kissane (1886-1959), Irish priest
- Jack Kissane (1936-2022), Irish Gaelic footballer and army officer
- Jim Kissane (born 1946), American basketball player
- Paudie Kissane (born 1980), Irish Gaelic footballer
- Richard Kissane (1868-?), Irish hurler
- Robert Kissane, American law enforcement officer
