= Jack Kissane =

Irish Gaelic footballer (1929–2022)

Personal information
- Native name: Seán Ó Cíosáin (Irish)
- Born: 20 November 1929 Lisselton, County Kerry, Ireland
- Died: 5 January 2022 (aged 92) Salthill, County Galway, Ireland
- Occupation: Brigadier-General
- Height: 5 ft 11 in (180 cm)

Sport
- Sport: Gaelic football
- Position: Left wing-back
Club
- Years: Club
- An Chéad Cath
Club titles
- Galway titles: 1
Inter-county
- Years: County
- 1953–1959: Galway
Inter-county titles
- Connacht titles: 5
- All-Irelands: 1
- NFL: 1

Seán Kissane (20 November 1929 – 5 January 2022) was an Irish Gaelic footballer who played at club level with An Chéad Cath and at inter-county level with the Galway senior football team. He usually lined out as a defender.

== Career ==
Kissane first came to prominence as a Gaelic footballer as a cadet officer in the Curragh, before moving to Galway. As a member of An Chéad Cath, he won a Galway SFC title in 1951. Kissane's displays for the Army team led to him being called up to the Galway senior football team and he made his championship debut in 1953. He won five Connacht Championship titles over the following seven seasons and was at right wing-back when Galway beat Cork in the 1956 All-Ireland final. Kissane also lined out when Galway were beaten by his native Kerry in the 1959 All-Ireland final.

== Personal life and death ==
Born in Killomeroe, Lisselton, County Kerry, in November 1929, Kissane received his army commission in 1951. He spent his early years with An Chéad Cath in Dún Uí Mhaoilíosa. Kissane served in the United Nations peacekeeping mission to the Congo from July 1960 to January 1961. He later served in Cyprus with UNFICYP. Promoted to the rank of Brigadier-General he was General Officer Commanding Southern Command from 1989 to his retirement in November 1990.

Kissane died at his home in Salthill, on 6 January 2022, at the age of 92.

== Honours ==
An Chéad Cath

- Galway Senior Football Championship: 1951

Galway

- All-Ireland Senior Football Championship: 1956
- Connacht Senior Football Championship: 1954, 1956, 1957, 1958, 1959
- National Football League: 1956–57
