= 1956–57 National Football League (Ireland) =

Gaelic football competition

League details
- Dates: October 1956 – 18 May 1957

League champions
- Winners: Galway (2nd win)
- Captain: Jack Mahon

League runners-up
- Runners-up: Kerry
- Captain: Jerome O'Shea

The 1956–57 National Football League was the 26th staging of the National Football League (NFL), an annual Gaelic football tournament for the Gaelic Athletic Association county teams of Ireland.

Galway beat Kerry in the final, which was remembered as one of the greatest games for years. Kerry lead 0-5 to 0-4 at half-time. The "goal of the century", created by Seán Purcell and scored by Frank Stockwell, secured victory.

== Results ==
=== Finals ===
18 May 1957
Final

Galway	1-8 – 0-6	Kerry
Frank Stockwell goal		Tadhgie Lyne, Paudie Sheehy 0-2 each; Mick Murphy, Tom Long 0-1 each

Croke Park, Dublin
Referee: Peter McDermott (Meath)
