= Des Nangle =

Irish Gaelic footballer

Personal information
- Native name: Deasún de Nógla (Irish)
- Born: 1943 (age 82–83) Ballincollig, County Cork, Ireland
- Occupation: Businessman

Sport
- Sport: Gaelic football
- Position: Right corner-back
Clubs
- Years: Club
- Ballincollig → Muskerry
Club titles
- Cork titles: 0
Inter-county
Years	County	Apps (scores)
1964-1965	Cork	3 (0-00)
Inter-county titles
- Munster titles: 0
- All-Irelands: 0
- NFL: 0

Desmond Nangle (born 1943) is an Irish former Gaelic footballer. He played with club side Ballincollig, divisional side Muskerry and at inter-county level with the Cork senior football team.

== Honours ==
Cork

- Munster Under-21 Football Championship: 1963
- All-Ireland Minor Football Championship: 1961
- Munster Minor Football Championship: 1961
