= Ardkeen =

Ardkeen may refer to:

- Ardkeen (civil parish), a civil parish in County Down, Northern Ireland
- Ardkeen, County Waterford, a suburb of Waterford, Ireland
