= Paul Doherty =

Paul Doherty may refer to:

- Paul C. Doherty (born 1946), British author, educator, lecturer and historian
- Paul Doherty (Gaelic footballer), inter-county goalkeeper for Galway
