= Ted Kelleher =

Irish Gaelic footballer

Personal information
- Native name: Tadhg Ó Céilleachair (Irish)
- Born: 17 March 1932 Millstreet, County Cork, Ireland
- Died: 5 May 2008 (aged 76) Norwood, Massachusetts, United States
- Occupation: Executive

Sport
- Sport: Gaelic Football
- Position: Right wing-forward
Club
- Years: Club
- Millstreet
Club titles
- Cork titles: 0
Inter-county
Years	County	Apps (scores)
1952-1953	Cork	1 (0-02)
Inter-county titles
- Munster titles: 0
- All-Irelands: 0
- NFL: 0

Timothy Patrick Kelleher (17 March 1932 – 5 May 2008) was an Irish Gaelic footballer who played for club side Millstreet and at inter-county level with the Cork senior football team. He usually lined out at forward.

== Career ==
Kelleher first played Gaelic football at juvenile and underage levels with Millstreet, before eventually joining the club's top adult team. He was a County Championship runner-up in 1956. Kelleher first appeared on the inter-county scene as a member of the Cork minor football team in 1950. Kelleher immediately progressed onto the Cork junior team and was right wing-forward on the All-Ireland-winning team in 1951. He later spent one season with the Cork senior football team.

== Personal life and death ==
Kelleher emigrated to New York City in 1959, where he later met and married his wife Kathleen (née Lafferty). He later settled in Norwood, Massachusetts and was a longt-ime executive at White Rock Products, Inc. until his retirement in 1990. Kelleher died on 5 May 2008, aged 76.

== Honours ==
Cork

- All-Ireland Junior Football Championship: 1951
- Munster Junior Football Championship: 1951
