= Matt Flannelly =

Irish Gaelic footballer

Personal information
- Nickname: Matt
- Born: 30 September 1888 Castlebar, County Mayo, Ireland
- Died: 22 October 1959 (aged 71) Ardkeen, Waterford, Ireland
- Occupation: Printer

Sport
- Sport: Gaelic football
Club
- Years: Club
- Tuam Stars
Club titles
- Galway titles: 4
Inter-county
- Years: County
- 1909-1919: Galway
Inter-county titles
- Connacht titles: 3
- All-Irelands: 0

Matthew Flannelly (30 September 1889 – 22 October 1959) was an Irish Gaelic footballer. At club level he played with several clubs, including Tuam Stars, and was a member of the Galway senior football team.

== Career ==
Flannelly first came to prominence as a Gaelic footballer with the St. Jarlath's Tuam that won the County Championship title in 1905. He subsequently lined out with the Tuam Stars when the rival clubs in the town merged, and won a further three championship titles. In 1910, Flannelly moved to Galway city and played with the Galway Commercials club for two years and took a leading role in the formation of the Galway Gaels club. Flannelly also enjoyed a ten-year association with the Galway senior football team and lined out in the 1919 All-Ireland final defeat by Kildare. He also won three Connacht Championship titles and also held the All-Ireland senior handball title at the age of 40.

== Personal life and death ==
Born in Castlebar, County Mayo, Flannelly worked as a printer with the Tuam News and then the Connacht Tribune. He was on the staff of the Galway Express when the offices and machinery were burned by Crown forces in 1920. Flannelly married Kathleen Craddock in October 1919 and the couple had five children. His son, Mick Flannelly, was an All-Ireland Championship-winner with the Waterford senior hurling team in 1959.

Flannelly died from stomach cancer on 22 October 1959, aged 71.

== Honours ==
Tuam St. Jarlath's

- Galway Senior Football Championship: 1905

Tuam Stars

- Galway Senior Football Championship: 1908, 1909, 1911

Galway

- Connacht Senior Football Championship: 1911, 1917, 1919
