= J. J. Hinchion =

Irish Gaelic footballer

Personal information
- Native name: S. S. Ó hInse (Irish)
- Born: 1926 Canovee, County Cork, Ireland
- Died: 13 March 2015 (aged 88) Macroom, County Cork, Ireland
- Occupation: Auctioneer
- Height: 5 ft 9 in (175 cm)

Sport
- Sport: Gaelic Football
- Position: Left wing-back
Clubs
- Years: Club
- Macroom; Millstreet; Canovee
Club titles
- Cork titles: 1
Inter-county*
Years	County	Apps (scores)
1952-1957	Cork	11 (0-05)
Inter-county titles
- Munster titles: 2
- All-Irelands: 0
- NFL: 1
- *Inter County team apps and scores correct as of 01:28, 12 April 2012.

John Joseph Hinchion (1926 – 13 March 2015) was an Irish Gaelic footballer who played for club sides Macroom, Millstreet and Canovee, as well as at senior level for the Cork county team. He lined out in both attack and defence.

== Career ==
Hinchion began his Gaelic football career with the Macroom minor team before winning a County Senior Championship medal with Millstreet in 1948. He subsequently joined the Canovee team, winning a County Junior Championship title in 1950. This victory resulted in Hinchion taking over the captaincy of the Cork junior team in 1951, ending the year with an All-Ireland- medal in that grade. This success saw him drafted onto the senior team and he won National League and Munster Championship medals in his debut season. Henchion won a second Munster Championship medal in 1957; however, the ultimate success eluded him after Cork's 1–09 to 1–07 defeat by Louth in the All-Ireland final.

== Personal life and death ==
Hinchion began his working life in the drapery business before opening an auctioneering business in Macroom. He died on 13 March 2015.

== Honours ==
Millstreet

- Cork Senior Football Championship: 1948

Canovee

- Cork Junior Football Championship: 1950

Cork

- Munster Senior Football Championship: 1952, 1957
- National Football League: 1951-52
- All-Ireland Junior Football Championship: 1951 (c)
- Munster Junior Football Championship: 1951 (c)

Achievements
Preceded by Stan Mellotte	All-Ireland Junior Football Final winning captain 1951	Succeeded by Paddy Whelan
