= Mattie McDonagh =

Galway Gaelic footballer

Personal information
- Native name: Maitiú Mac Donnchadha (Irish)
- Nickname: Big Matt
- Born: 1936 Ballygar, County Galway
- Died: 11 April 2005 (aged 68–69)
- Occupation: National school teacher
- Height: 6 ft 0 in (183 cm)

Sport
- Sport: Gaelic football
- Position: Centre-forward
Club
- Years: Club
- 1955–1969: Ballygar
Club titles
- Galway titles: 0
Inter-county
- Years: County
- 1956–1968: Galway
Inter-county titles
- Connacht titles: 10
- All-Irelands: 4
- NFL: 2
- All Stars: 2

Matthew "Mattie" McDonagh (1936 – 11 April 2005) was an Irish Gaelic footballer who played for his local club Ballygar and at senior level for the Galway county team from 1956 until 1968. McDonagh later served as manager of the Galway team. He is the only man from Connacht with four All-Ireland Senior Football Championship winner's medals.

== Biography ==
He sprung to sporting prominence as a teenager when he starred with Summerhill College, Sligo, where his colleagues remembered him from his striking stature as a youngster. Before he was 18 he had won the Connacht Colleges title and also won a Roscommon minor hurling medal with Ballygar.

Big Mattie burst on to the national scene in 1956 when forming the midfield partnership with Frank Evers which provided the possession lifeline for the side which powered their way to a 2–13 to 3–7 All-Ireland final victory over Cork on the day that Seán Purcell and Frank Stockwell ran riot, Stockwell setting a scoring record of 2–05 from play.

After the initial flush of success some lean years followed and Mattie had to bear the disappointment of two county final defeats with Ballygar at the hands of Tuam Stars and Dunmore McHales, the later by the narrowest of margins but the best was yet to come.

McDonagh was a member of the Galway senior football team during the 1960s. Following the county's defeat to Dublin in the 1963 All-Ireland Senior Football Championship Final, Galway, managed by John Dunne, won three consecutive All-Ireland titles. The team defeated Kerry in the 1964 and 1965 finals before beating Meath in 1966 to complete the three-in-a-row. McDonagh scored the only goal of the 1996 final with a left-footed strike as Galway won 1-10 to 0-7.

McDonagh is the only Connacht player to have won four senior All-Ireland medals.

He took over as manager of the Galway senior team in 1980, following a period of dispute between players and the county board.

McDonagh, although fiercely competitive in every sport, had an easy temperament which helped him to assuage fears and tensions. One year later he led Galway to what turned out to be their last National League success when routing Roscommon in the Croke Park final although their semi-final victory over Kerry in Ennis was the real highlight of that series.

The same year he and his charges had to endure the shock of a Connacht championship defeat when Willie Nally and Willie Joe Padden of Mayo "caught all around them" but the following year Galway were desperately disappointed to lose out to Offaly in the 1982 semi-final before going all the way to the final in the infamous decider of 1983 when Dublin edged Galway out.

Mattie McDonagh died at the age of 68 on 10 April 2005. Tributes poured in from GAA colleagues and officials including GAA president Seán Kelly, who said that the Association was greatly saddened by his loss. He was buried in his native Ballygar soil.

== Honours ==
=== Ballygar ===
- Galway Senior Football Championship:
  - Winner (0):
  - Runner-up (2): 1957, 1958, 1961

=== Galway ===
- All-Ireland Senior Football Championship:
  - Winner (4): 1956, 1964, 1965, 1966
  - Runner-up (2): 1959, 1963
- Connacht Senior Football Championship:
  - Winner (10): 1956, 1957, 1958, 1959, 1960, 1963, 1964, 1965, 1966, 1968
  - Runner-up (2): 1961, 1962
- National Football League:
  - Winner (2): 1956–57, 1964–65
  - Runner-up (1): 1966-67

=== Connacht ===
- Railway Cup:
  - Winner (1): 1958

Sporting positions
Preceded by Liam O'Neill	Galway Senior Football Manager; 1980–1983	Succeeded by Tony Regan
Awards
Preceded by Martin L. Newell (Galway)	Caltex Footballer of the Year; 1966	Succeeded by Bertie Cunningham (Meath)
