= Seán Moore (Gaelic footballer) =

Irish Gaelic footballer (born 1934)

Personal information
- Native name: Seán Ó Mórdha (Irish)
- Born: 1934 (age 91–92) Moneygall, County Offaly, Ireland
- Occupation: Administrative officer
- Height: 6 ft 1 in (185 cm)

Sport
- Sport: Gaelic Football
- Position: Midfield
Clubs
- Years: Club
- Castlebar Mitchels; Glenview; Seandún
Club titles
- Cork titles: 0
Inter-county
Years	County	Apps (scores)
1954-1958	Cork	11 (0-01)
Inter-county titles
- Munster titles: 2
- All-Irelands: 0
- NFL: 1

Seán Moore (born 1934) was an Irish Gaelic footballer and athlete who played for club side Glenview, divisional side Seandún, at senior level with the Cork county team and with Munster. He usually lined out at midfield.

== Career ==
Moore first came to prominence as a Gaelic footballer when he was selected for the Munster colleges team while a student at the North Monastery. After a brief stint with the Mitchels club in Castlebar, he subsequently joined the Glenview club also earned selection on the Seandún divisional team. A brief period with the Cork junior team was followed by inclusion on the senior side in 1954. Moore enjoyed great success throughout the 1956–57 seasons, winning a National League medal and consecutive Munster Championship medals. The ultimate success eluded him as Cork suffered back-to-back All-Ireland final defeats to Galway and Louth. Moore was also a noted athlete and lifted the Irish decathlon title in 1958, as well as an All-Ireland title in basketball. A motorcycle accident in December 1958 brought a premature end to his football and athletic careers.

== Personal life ==
Moore was born in Moneygall, County Offaly. The son of a Garda, the family moved to Cork when he was just six months old. After his education at the North Monastery, Moore spent a year working in the tax office in Castlebar. He returned to Cork and worked as an administrative officer with the ESB.

== Honours ==
Cork

- Munster Senior Football Championship: 1956, 1957
- National Football League: 1955-56
