= John Lynch (Roscommon Gaelic footballer) =

Irish Gaelic footballer (1933–2019)

Personal information
- Native name: Seán Ó Loingsigh (Irish)
- Born: 1933 Loughglinn, County Roscommon, Ireland
- Died: 5 June 2019 (aged 85) Loughglinn, County Roscommon, Ireland
- Occupation: Roofing contractor
- Height: 5 ft 11 in (180 cm)

Sport
- Sport: Gaelic football
- Position: Full-back
Clubs
- Years: Club
- Loughlynn; Tuam Stars
Club titles
- Galway titles: 2
Inter-county
- Years: County
- 1953–1964: Roscommon
Inter-county titles
- Connacht titles: 2
- All-Irelands: 0
- NFL: 0

John Lynch (1933 – 5 June 2019) was an Irish Gaelic footballer who played for a number of clubs, including Tuam Stars in the Galway Senior Championship. He played for the Roscommon senior football team for 11 seasons, during which time he usually lined out at full-back.

== Honours ==
Tuam Stars

- Galway Senior Football Championship (2): 1960, 1962

Roscommon

- Connacht Senior Football Championship (2): 1961, 1962
- All-Ireland Minor Football Championship (1): 1951
- Connacht Minor Football Championship (1): 1951
