= Frank Evers (Gaelic footballer) =

Irish Gaelic footballer (1934–2025)

Personal information
- Native name: Prionsias Mac Iomaire (Irish)
- Born: Francis Anthony Evers Jr. 27 August 1934
- Died: 5 October 2025 (aged 91)
- Height: 188 cm (6 ft 2 in)

Sport
- Sport: Gaelic football
- Position: Midfield
Clubs
- Years: Club
- 1952 1953–1956 1956-1958 1958–1960 1962: Franciscan, Multy; Menlough; Garda GAA; Menlough; Tuam Stars; Menlough
Club titles
- Galway titles: 1 (Galway)
- Provincial titles: 0
- All-Ireland Titles: 0
Inter-county
- Years: County
- 1952–1953 1953–1962: Westmeath; Galway
Inter-county titles
- All-Irelands: 1 (Galway)
- NFL: 1 (Galway)
- All Stars: 0

Francis Anthony Evers Jr. (27 August 1934 – 5 October 2025), known as Frank Evers, was an Irish Gaelic footballer who played for the Galway county team in the 1950s and early 1960s. He played his last game for Galway in 1962.

== Career ==
Evers was a native of Menlough, County Galway. He started at the Senior National level in 1952, when he was only 18 years old. Called a "towering figure of a man" and a "marvellous Croke Park man" by his colleague Jack Mahon, he also formed a famous centrefield partnership with Mattie McDonagh. He played for Westmeath Seniors in the League of 1952–53 and transferred to his native County Galway in 1953.

He won an All-Ireland Senior Football Championship with Galway in 1956, when Galway defeated Cork, and a Runners-up Shield in 1959, when Galway were defeated by Kerry in the 1959 final. He won six Connacht Senior Medals (1954 and 1956–1960), when he played in all five Connacht Finals. He was a member of Westmeath Minor team who won the 1952 Leinster Minor Championship, beaten in the All-Ireland Minor Football semi-final by Cavan. Evers's native county, Galway, won the All Ireland Minor football Final in 1952.

Evers was a member of the Franciscan College at Multyfarnham's senior football team that won the Leinster senior football Colleges Championship in 1952, defeating St. Mels in the Leinster Final. Evers was selected for the Leinster Senior Colleges in 1951 and 52, was selected on three occasions for the Ireland Selections to play the Irish Universities. He was also selected for Connacht Senior Football teams, in the Railway Cup Competition and won Railway Cup Medals on two occasions. He won a Football National League medal in 1957, qualifying for a trip to New York City and played in the St. Brendan's Cup Final that year in the old Polo Grounds (in New York, USA). Evers won a Galway Senior Championship Medal with Tuam Stars in 1962. He played with Galway in 1958 in London's Wembley Stadium, in the inaugural Whit Weekend Games.

== United Nations ==
After retiring from Gaelic football, Evers worked for the United Nations. In 1960, he joined the United Nations Peacekeeping Organisation and left for the Middle East on 1 September 1960, having played for Galway Seniors in the All Ireland semi-final of 1960 versus Kerry. He was picked for the Ireland Selection of 1960, however he was out of the country by that time and did not participate in the annual game. Evers's last game for Galway was in 1962. He worked with the United Nations from 1 September 1960 to 27 August 1994.

During two breaks from the UN, he worked in Ireland as Chief of Personnel Division with Standard Pressed Steel Galway and Digital Equipment Company NCR Dublin. His service with the United Nations took him at first to the UN Truce and Supervisory Organisation in Jerusalem as an international civil servant reporting to the UN in New York. Thereafter, until retirement he served in such places as Damascus, Beirut, Sana’a, Nicosia, Vienna, Ismailia, Cairo, Rabbah Sinai, Amman, and Tiberias. After retirement in 1994 he worked for the OSCE (Organisation for Security and Cooperation in Europe) in Kosovo.

== Personal life and death ==
The son of Sgt Francis Anthony Evers (a Garda officer) and Hannah Evers née Rayner (both Dublin-born), Evers Jr. followed his father's footsteps and joined the Garda force in 1954. He was based at Store Street GS, Dublin, but left by 1960 to join the U.N.

Evers was married to Irish actress Teresa Evers (née Doyle), with whom he had seven children including businessman Frank Evers. His first wife Teresa, died in 2020. He later lived in Vancouver, British Columbia, Canada and moved to Graz, Austria in his later life along with his second wife, Brigitte.

Evers died on 5 October 2025 at age 91.
