= Moss O'Connell =

Kerry Gaelic footballer and hurler (1935–2022)

Personal information
- Native name: Muiris Ó Conaill (Irish)
- Nickname: Moss
- Born: 1935 Abbeydorney, County Kerry, Ireland
- Died: 15 June 2022 (aged 87) Manchester, England
- Occupation: Roman Catholic priest
- Height: 5 ft 10 in (178 cm)

Sport
- Sport: Gaelic football
- Position: Right wing-back
Clubs
- Years: Club
- Abbeydorney → St Brendan's
Club titles
- Kerry titles: 0
Inter-county
Years	County	Apps (scores)
1958–1959	Kerry	5 (0–0)
Inter-county titles
- Munster titles: 2
- All-Irelands: 1
- NFL: 1

Maurice O'Connell (1935 – 15 June 2022) was an Irish Gaelic footballer and hurler. At club level he played with Abbeydorney and was also a member of the Kerry senior teams as a dual player.

== Career ==
O'Connell first played at club level with Abbeydorney. He won a Kerry MFC title with the St Brendan's divisional side in 1953 and later lost consecutive Kerry SFC finals with that team. He also lost a Kerry SHC final with Abbeydorney in 1954. O'Connell first appeared on the inter-county scene as a member of the Kerry senior hurling team that won the 1956–57 National Hurling League Division 2 title. He was later called up to the Kerry senior football team and came on as a substitute for Mick O'Connell in the 1959 All-Ireland SFC final defeat of Galway. O'Connell later lined out with the Lancashire team that lost the 1963 All-Ireland JFC final to Kerry.

== Personal life and death ==
O'Connell entered the priesthood in the early 1950s, attending All Hallows College in Dublin. He moved to Greater Manchester in 1959 and spent six years at St Anne's Church in Crumpsall. O'Connell later spent 14 years at Salford Cathedral and a decade at St Teresa's in Stretford, before spending over 25 years at St Joseph's in Reddish. He died on 15 June 2022, aged 87.

== Honours ==
Abbeydorney

- North Kerry Intermediate Hurling Championship: 1954
- Kerry Junior Hurling Championship: 1951

St Brendan's District Board

- Kerry Minor Football Championship: 1953

Kerry

- All-Ireland Senior Football Championship: 1959
- Munster Senior Football Championship: 1958, 1959
- National Football League: 1958–59
- National Hurling League Division 2: 1956–57
