= Derry Gowen =

- Born: 1 February 1933; Fermoy, County Cork, Ireland
- Died: 6 December 2017 (aged 84); Fermoy, County Cork, Ireland
- Resting place: Kilcrumper Old Cemetery.
- Occupations: Auctioneer, funeral director, businessman
- Known for: Gaelic games administrator
- Spouse: Breda Harte
- Children: Grainne Orla Diarmuid Sinead

Derry Gowen (1 February 1933 – 6 December 2017) was an Irish hurler and Gaelic footballer, Gaelic Athletic Association administrator, referee and selector.

== Playing career ==
Gowen played as a juvenile in the first North Cork Hurling Championship in 1946. He won minor hurling and football North Cork Championships with St. Patrick's, Fermoy and also won a Junior Hurling Championship with the club.

== Coaching career ==
Gowen was a selector when the Cork minor football team won their very first All-Ireland MFC title in 1961. He later served as a selector with the Avondhu divisional senior football and hurling teams and was also senior hurling team trainer when Avondhu won the 1966 Cork SHC title. Gowen was also a selector with the Cork senior football team when they won the All-Ireland SFC title in 1973.

== Administrative career ==
Gowen began his career as administrator when he served as secretary of the St. Patrick's juvenile club from 1950 to 1961. He also served as secretary and vice-chairman of the Fermoy adult club. Gowen was elected chairman of the North Cork Divisional Board in 1960, a position he held for over 25 years. During his tenure a successful divisional under-21 football competition was held, eventually leading to the inauguration of Munster-wide inter-county under-21 championships in both codes. He was also the founder of Scór in North Cork in 1969 before it was formally organised nationally in 1970. Gowen gave nearly 20 years service to the Cork County Board at various times between 1964 and 1987, during which time he held the offices of PRO, treasurer, vice-chairman, chairman and Central Council delegate. He served a further three years as President.

== Death ==
Gowen died on 6 December 2017, aged 84.

== Coaching honours ==
Avondhu

- Cork Senior Hurling Championship: 1966

Cork

- All-Ireland Senior Football Championship: 1973
- Munster Senior Football Championship: 1973, 1974
- All-Ireland Minor Football Championship: 1961
- Munster Minor Football Championship: 1961

Sporting positions
Preceded by Paddy O'Driscoll	Treasurer of the Cork County Board; 1964-1971	Succeeded by Gene Fitzgerald
Preceded by Paddy O'Driscoll	Vice-Chairman of the Cork County Board; 1979-1981	Succeeded by Denis Conroy
Preceded by Jack Barrett	Chairman of the Cork County Board; 1972	Succeeded by Jack Barrett
Preceded by Paddy O'Driscoll	Chairman of the Cork County Board; 1982-1984	Succeeded by Con Murphy
Preceded by Mick Barry	Vice-Chairman of the Cork County Board; 1988	Succeeded by Tony O'Mahony
