= Conor Doherty =

Irish Gaelic footballer from Galway

Personal information
- Native name: Conchúir Ó Dochartaigh (Irish)
- Born: 22 November 1990 (age 35) Galway, Ireland
- Height: 1.83 m (6 ft 0 in)

Sport
- Sport: Gaelic Football
- Position: Right half Forward
Club
- Years: Club
- 2008–2013: Tuam Stars
Inter-county
- Years: County
- 2011–2013: Galway

Conor Doherty (born 22 November 1990) is an Irish Gaelic footballer from Galway. Doherty played his club football with Tuam Stars and county football for the Galway senior football team from 2011 to 2013.

He was Right half back on the Galway Minor team that won the All-Ireland Minor Football Championship in 2007.

Doherty previously played with the Galway U21 team who won the All-Ireland defeating Cavan.

== Honours ==
College

- Connacht Colleges Senior Football Championship (2): 2007, 2008

County

- Connacht Minor Football Championship (1): 2007
- All-Ireland Minor Football Championship (1): 2007
- Connacht Under-21 Football Championship (1): 2011
- All-Ireland Under-21 Football Championship (1): 2011
