= Paddy O'Driscoll =

Irish Gaelic footballer (born 1927)

Personal information
- Native name: Pádraig Ó Drisceoil (Irish)
- Nickname: Patey
- Born: 1927 Ballycotton, County Cork, Ireland
- Died: 19 October 2001 (aged 73–74) Wilton, Cork, Ireland
- Occupations: Garda, security officer
- Height: 5 ft 11 in (180 cm)

Sport
- Sport: Gaelic football
- Position: Right corner-back
Clubs
- Years: Club
- Garda (Dublin); Garda (Cork); Russell Rovers
Club titles
- Cork titles: 1
Inter-county*
| Years | County | Apps (scores) |
| 1949-1959 | Cork | 27 (0-00) |
Inter-county titles
- Munster titles: 4
- All-Irelands: 0
- NFL: 2
- *Inter County team apps and scores correct as of 22:05, 12 April 2012.

Patrick O'Driscoll (1927 – 19 October 2001) was an Irish Gaelic footballer who played as a right corner-back at senior level for the Cork county team. He was named in the "Cork Football Team of the Millennium" in January 2000.

O'Driscoll joined the team during the 1950 championship and was a regular member of the starting fifteen until his retirement a decade later. During that time he won two National League medals and two Munster medals, however, he never won an All-Ireland winners' medal.

He had a lengthy career with the Russell Rovers and Garda club teams.

In retirement from playing O'Driscoll served as an administrator with the Cork County Board and was also a selector when Cork won the All-Ireland in 1973.

Sporting positions
| Preceded by Nealie Duggan | Cork Senior Football Captain; 1958 | Succeeded by |
| Preceded by Con Murphy | Treasurer of the Cork County Board; 1957-1963 | Succeeded by Derry Gowen |
| Preceded by Donal O'Sullivan | Chairman of the Cork County Board; 1979-1981 | Succeeded by Derry Gowen |
