= Kevin Beahan =

Louth Gaelic footballer (1933–2022)

Personal information
- Native name: Caoimhín Ó Beacháin (Irish)
- Born: 9 April 1933 Ardee, County Louth, Ireland
- Died: 24 July 2022 (aged 89) Donnybrook, County Dublin, Ireland
- Occupation: Accountant
- Height: 5 ft 9 in (175 cm)

Sport
- Sport: Gaelic football
- Position: Midfield
Clubs
- Years: Club
- St Mary's; Naomh Colmcille; Seán McDermotts (Dublin)
Club titles
| | Football | Hurling |
| Louth titles | 5 | 3 |
Inter-county
- Years: County
- 1953-64: Louth
Inter-county titles
- Leinster titles: 1
- All-Irelands: 1
- NFL: 0

Kevin Beahan (Irish: Caoimhín Ó Beacháin; 9 April 1933 – 24 July 2022) was an Irish Gaelic footballer who played for a number of club sides, including St Mary's, and at inter-county level with the Louth senior football team.

== Career ==
Beahan first played Gaelic football at St Patrick's Grammar School in Armagh. During his time there he won consecutive Ulster Colleges JFC titles and also lined out in the MacRory Cup. At club level, Beahan won consecutive Louth MFC titles with the St Mary's club in Ardee before later winning five Louth SFC titles. He also experienced success as a hurler, winning three Louth SHC titles with Naomh Colmcille, while he also lined out with the Seán McDermotts club in Dublin.

Beahan's performances for club and college resulted in him being selected for the Louth minor football team and he won a Leinster MFC medal in 1951. He progressed onto the senior team and was at midfield for the 1–09 to 1–07 defeat of Cork in the 1957 All-Ireland final. Beahan also lined out with Leinster and was a two-time Railway Cup medallist.

== Death ==
Beahan died on 24 July 2022, aged 89.

== Honours ==
St Patrick's Grammar School

- Ulster Colleges Junior Football Championship: 1949, 1950

Naomh Colmcille

- Louth Senior Hurling Championship: 1955, 1958, 1960

Ardee (Minor combination)

- Louth Minor Football Championship: 1950, 1951

St Mary's

- Louth Senior Football Championship: 1951, 1955, 1956, 1960, 1968
- Cardinal O'Donnell Cup (Senior Football League): 1952, 1953, 1954, 1955, 1956
- Old Gaels Cup: 1955, 1956, 1959

Seán McDermotts

- Dublin Senior Football League: 1957

Louth

- All-Ireland Senior Football Championship: 1957
- Leinster Senior Football Championship: 1957
- O'Byrne Cup: 1963
- Leinster Minor Football Championship: 1951

Leinster

- Railway Cup: 1959, 1963

Sporting positions
| Preceded by John McArdle | Louth Senior Football Captain; 1961 | Succeeded by Jimmy Mulroy |
