= 1948 All-Ireland Minor Hurling Championship =

All-Ireland Minor Hurling Championship 1948
All Ireland Champions
- Winners: Waterford (2nd win)
- Captain: Mick Flannelly

All Ireland Runners-up
- Runners-up: Kilkenny

Provincial Champions
- Munster: Waterford
- Leinster: Kilkenny
- Ulster: Antrim
- Connacht: Galway

The 1948 All-Ireland Minor Hurling Championship was the 18th staging of the All-Ireland Minor Hurling Championship since its establishment by the Gaelic Athletic Association in 1928.

Tipperary entered the championship as the defending champions, however, they were beaten by Waterford in the Munster final.

On 5 September 1948 Waterford won the championship following a 3-8 to 4-2 defeat of Kilkenny in the All-Ireland final. This was their second All-Ireland title and their first in 16 championship seasons.

== Results ==
=== All-Ireland Minor Hurling Championship ===
Semi-finals

1 August 1948 Semi-final	Kilkenny	2-11 - 1-07	Antrim	Croke Park, Dublin

15 August 1948 Semi-final	Waterford	8-12 - 3-02	Galway	Croke Park, Dublin

Final

5 September 1948 Final	Waterford	3-08 - 4-02	Kilkenny	Croke Park, Dublin

== Championship statistics ==
=== Miscellaneous ===
- The All-Ireland final between Waterford and Kilkenny was the first ever championship meeting between the two teams.
- Waterford became the fifth team to win more than one All-Ireland Championship title.
