= P. J. Smyth =

Galway Gaelic footballer

Personal information
- Native name: P. S. Mac Gabhann (Irish)
- Born: 1948 (age 77–78) Tuam, County Galway
- Height: 5 ft 10 in (178 cm)

Sport
- Sport: Gaelic football
- Position: Goalkeeper
Club
- Years: Club
- 1960s–1980s: Tuam Stars
Inter-county
- Years: County
- 1971–1972: Galway
Inter-county titles
- Connacht titles: 1
- All-Irelands: 0
- NFL: 0
- All Stars: 1

P. J. Smyth (born 1948 in Tuam, County Galway) is an Irish former Gaelic footballer who played for his local club Tuam Stars and at senior level for the Galway county team from 1971 until 1972. Smyth has the distinction of being the first football All-Star goalkeeper.
