= Ballygar =

Village in County Galway, Ireland

Ballygar Irish: Béal Átha Ghártha
- Village
- Location in Ireland
- Coordinates: 53.51667°N 8.31667°W
- Country: Ireland
- Province: Connacht
- County: Galway
- Elevation: 66 m (217 ft)

Population (2022)
  - Total: 660
- Irish Grid Reference: M790518

Ballygar (Irish: Béal Átha Ghártha) is a village in County Galway, Ireland. It is 19 km from Roscommon town.

== History ==
=== Name and origins ===
The name Ballygar, historically Beallagarr, comes from Irish: Béal Átha Ghártha. The settlement has been a meeting point of the McDermott clan and trading centre throughout the centuries and was recorded as a townland and farm as far back as 1585.

Although the townland and farm are recorded as far back as 1585, it was not until the 1820s that it became a centre of population. On 6 August 1585, the chieftains and landowners of Galway and Roscommon were summoned to a meeting with the Lord Deputy, Sir John Perrot, in Galway city. The object of the meeting was to get the landowners and chieftains to surrender their lands to Elizabeth I and then receive them back from the Crown at a rent of one penny an acre. The landowners accepted the terms, and one of the signatories to that document of surrender was Francis Shane, gent, of Ballygar, possibly the proprietor of Ballygar Castle at the time.

=== Ballygar Castle ===
The next mention of Ballygar is in the Book of Survey Distribution; this shows the Earl of St Albans as being the beneficial owner of the land of Bealagara in Killeroran Parish in 1641. He was dispossessed of this land and Ballygar Castle. It was subsequently granted to the Earl of Clanricarde. A garrison was stationed in Ballygar Castle during the rebellion of the 1640s. Ballygar Castle seems to have disappeared from the scene in the early 18th century. A document, dated 1704, shows the Clanricarde family as having leased Ballygar Farm plus parts of Drinaun and Killeroran, 800 acres (3.2 km^{2}) in all, to Edward Donnellan of Streamstown, Co Westmeath, for two lives i.e. sixty-two years at a rent of two shillings per acre per year. In 1820, a toll market was established near the main entrance to Castle Kelly by Denis Henry Kelly who owned 13,500 acres (55 km^{2}) of the surrounding countryside.

=== A Market Town – 1840 ===
The market was a success from the beginning and around this, the thriving market town of Ballygar grew. By 1840 Ballygar market was said to be second only to the Athlone market in the volume of trade. According to the census of 1841, there was a population of 5,300 living on the Kelly estate. As the market grew, so did the demand for shops and dwellings. Denis had these built and leased them to suitable tenants. Twenty years after its foundation Ballygar had 52 houses and a population of 363. It is not known whether Denis was a teetotaller or not, but there were only two public houses in Ballygar in 1839. One of these was located near J. Curley's shop, the other was situated where T. Hanley's drapery shop is now. The town was planned in an orderly fashion, a wide main street, a market square, a diamond at the main entrance to his estate and two back streets to give access to the rear of all premises.

Denis believed in keeping his town tidy, and, to this end, he visited every house in town on the first day of the month. If the house or shop was being kept clean and tidy he issued the tenant with a cleanliness ticket, and at the end of the year the tenant with the most tickets received a prize of £1.10s; the next prize was 10s.6d. All the tenants who had received tickets were invited to have dinner with him in Castle Kelly

Another innovation introduced to Ballygar in 1835 was the Reproductive Loan Fund. This was a non-profit-making organisation, and tenants had access to the fund in times of hardship. It was run on much the same lines as the Credit Union. In 1844, £1,000 of the loan fund was in circulation in the locality. The loan office was situated on Main Street where Clarke's Hardware is now.

=== Killeroran Graveyard and other developments ===
The Great Famine, 1845–1850, with all its hardships, hunger and deprivation brought a halt to the rapid development of the town, but not for long. Griffith's Valuation 1855 shows Ballygar as having 67 houses, Police Barracks, a Parochial School House, Dispensary and Protestant Church. The late 1850s saw further building development in the town and locality. A new Parochial School was built in the market square and a new Catholic Church a year later. About this time also the market house, a six-storey building of cut stone was erected on the market square. By the end of the decade, a 93-foot stone tower was erected in Killeroran Graveyard, the Courthouse was built, also the Grand Bridge, a magnificent cut-stone structure which spans the river that flows through Castle Kelly. The construction of the bridge alone is said to have cost £1,000 in 1859.

The building programme mustn't have been as rewarding as Denis Kelly expected, for in 1863 we find the entire Kelly estate being offered for sale by the courts, under the Encumbered Estates Act. Denis retired to Araghty Grange, a small estate he owned near Athleague. He died in 1877 and is buried in the old Church in Killeroran. The Kelly estate, 12,000 acres (49 km^{2}) complete with Castle and town, was bought by Christopher Neville Bagott for £105,000.

Other than collecting rents, the Bagott family played a passive role in the life of the area. The owner, Christopher Bagott, lived in London and spent very little time on the estate, leaving its management to his brothers. Following Christopher Bagott's death, the estate was left to his brother John Bagott (died 1877). Christopher Bagott's wife contested her husband's will, and a subsequent trial - at the Probate Court in Dublin- found in favour of Mrs Bagott and her son. The court administered the estate on their behalf until the young heir came of age. The entire estate was offered for sale in 1903. It was purchased by the Land Commission and later the Forestry Commission acquired Castlekelly and the 1,600 acres (6.5 km^{2}) surrounding it.

=== The Great Famine (An Gorta Mór) ===
The population structure of Ballygar Parish (Killeroran and Killian) has been like most other parts of rural Ireland in steady decline since the Great Famine of 1845. The Great Famine or An Gorta Mór as it has become known, of 1845 had a devastating effect on Ireland, and Ballygar didn't escape the horror that resulted from the failure of the main food crop, the potato, throughout the years of 1845 to 1849. Few details survive of An Gorta Mór, and the story of how hundreds of local people, mostly peasant rural dwellers, died of starvation, remains unrecorded. Probably the greatest tragedy of all surrounding An Gorta Mór was the sale by farming communities of large amounts of eggs and animals in order to pay rent to their local landlord, while they themselves, and their neighbours, were dying of starvation.

From the years 1845 to 1850, local Ballygar farming communities started to emigrate en masse, mainly for America and Australia. In a well-researched piece on Trihill National School, Norma Hoilean records how the residents of one townland Bohill all emigrated on the same day. It must have been a horrific day in Bohill – with the entire community of old and young taking with them their meagre belongings and heading off to locate one of the coffin ships in Cobh or Galway. Unfortunately, nobody has any idea of whatever happened to them, but it can only be assumed that some of them at least reached "the promised land". As an illustration of this, it is recorded that thirteen entire families from Cork Unitarian Church left Cork on the same boat to Australia in 1847.

The exodus from the area to the U.S. continued throughout the latter part of the 19th century and indeed for much of the first part of the twentieth. It was this exodus of people from Ballygar, which resulted in virtually every family in the parish of today having some relatives in America.

While few stories survive even in local folklore about the famine, in a field owned by Martin "Prince" Kelly in the village of Ballinacor, there are five simple graves adjacent to a sandpit. One of these graves has a number of simple field stones surrounding it. It is possible that famine victims were buried here without ceremony and possibly without a priest being present.

=== 1860 to 1890 ===
Practically no expansion took place in Ballygar town from 1860 to 1891. The census of 1891 shows it as having 69 houses and a population of 289. Then for some reason, the first decade of this century saw a great increase in the population of the town, from 289 to 403, an increase of about 35%. Eleven houses were built in the town in that decade.

== Amenities ==
The village is the home of a number of businesses, shops, grocers, and butchers. One of these shops, in existence for many generations, was a general store and meeting place in the village.

In 2003, the village welcomed the Afghanistan Special Olympics team whilst they competed in the 2003 Special Olympics World Summer Games.

Ballygar Carnival has been an annual event since 1945. Entertainment events and the carnival include dancing, discos, a fun fair, street entertainment, fancy dress, country fair, pig races, and sports tournaments.

The public library in Ballygar provides a reference and local studies collection with information on the heritage and history of the area.

== Townlands ==
Townlands in Ballygar include Mucanagh (the ford of the pigs) on the Galway side of the River Suck. Despite some dredging of the River Suck in the 1970s, Mucanagh townland is liable to flooding. The River Shiven also flows through the area.

== Notable residents ==
- Mattie McDonagh, Galway footballer, and the only Connacht man to win four All-Ireland Senior Football medals.
- Patrick Sarsfield Gilmore, songwriter who wrote "When Johnny Comes Marching Home".
