= Joe Young (dual player) =

Irish hurler and Gaelic footballer (1933–2023)

Personal information
- Born: 15 November 1933 Donnycarney, Dublin, Ireland
- Died: 6 May 2023 (aged 89) Barna, County Galway, Ireland
- Occupation: Army officer
- Height: 5 ft 11 in (180 cm)

Sport
- Football Position: Centre-forward
- Hurling Position: Right wing-forward
Clubs
- Years: Club
- St. Vincent's; An Chéad Cath
Club titles
	Football	Hurling
Dublin titles	1	2
Inter-county
- Years: County
- 1953–1954 1955–1958 1955–1961: Dublin (SH); Galway (SH); Galway (SF)
Inter-county titles
	Football	Hurling
Connacht Titles	6	0
All-Ireland Titles	1	0
League titles	0	0

Joseph Young (15 November 1933 – 6 May 2023) was an Irish hurler and Gaelic footballer. At club level he played with St. Vincent's and An Chéad Cath, and also lined out as a dual player at inter-county level with various Dublin and Galway teams.

== Career ==
Young first played Gaelic football and hurling as a schoolboy at St. Joseph's CBS in Fairview. He simultaneously progressed to adult level with the St. Vincent's club as a dual player and won Dublin SHC medals in 1954 before completing a SHC-SFC double in 1954. Young later lined out with An Chéad Cath in Galway.

Young first appeared on the inter-county scene at minor level with Dublin. He later progressed to the Dublin junior team and won an All-Ireland medal in that grade in 1952. Young spent a number of years with the Dublin senior hurling team before transferring to the Galway senior teams as a dual player. As a hurler, he suffered All-Ireland final defeats against Wexford in 1955 and Tipperary in 1958. As a Gaelic footballer, Young won six consecutive Connacht SFC medals. He also claimed an All-Ireland SFC medal in 1956.

== Personal life and death ==
Born in Donnycarney, Young enlisted in the Defence Forces as a member of 27 Cadet Class and was commissioned into the Infantry Corps in 1954. He spent his early years with An Chéad Cath in Galway, before later serving in a variety of appointments throughout the Defence Forces.

Young died on 6 May 2023, at the age of 89.

== Honours ==
St. Vincent's

- Dublin Senior Football Championship: 1954
- Dublin Senior Hurling Championship: 1953, 1954

Dublin

- All-Ireland Junior Hurling Championship: 1952
- Leinster Junior Hurling Championship: 1952

Galway

- All-Ireland Senior Football Championship: 1955
- Connacht Senior Football Championship: 1955, 1956, 1957, 1958, 1959, 1960
