= Mick Flannelly =

Irish hurler (1930–2021)

Personal information
- Native name: Mícheál Ó Flannaile (Irish)
- Nickname: Mick Flan
- Born: 21 February 1930 Waterford, Ireland
- Died: 11 September 2021 (aged 91) Waterford, Ireland
- Occupation: Printer
- Height: 5 ft 7 in (170 cm)

Sport
- Sport: Hurling
- Position: Right wing-forward
Club
- Years: Club
- 1948–1966: Mount Sion
Club titles
- Waterford titles: 15
Inter-county*
Years	County	Apps (scores)
1949–1965	Waterford	33 (10–24)
Inter-county titles
- Munster titles: 3
- All-Irelands: 1
- NHL: 1
- *Inter County team apps and scores correct as of 17:39, 22 March 2015.

Michael Peter Flannelly (21 February 1930 – 11 September 2021) was an Irish hurler. At club level he played with Mount Sion and was also a member of the Waterford senior hurling team. Flannelly usually lined out as a forward.

== Career ==
Flannelly first came to hurling prominence at juvenile and underage levels with the Mount Sion club. An undefeated tenure with the club's minor team yielded three successive championship titles before being drafted onto the Mount Sion senior team. Flannelly's senior club career lasted nearly 20 years, during which time he won a record 15 County Championship titles from 18 appearances in finals. His success at underage level with the club brought him to the attention of the inter-county selectors, and he captained the Waterford minor team to the All-Ireland Minor Championship title in 1948. Flannelly joined the senior team during the 1949-50 league and remained with the team for 16 seasons. He won an All-Ireland Championship title after scoring 1-01 from wing-forward against Kilkenny in the 1959 All-Ireland final replay. Flannelly's other honours include three Munster Championships, one National Hurling League and an Oireachtas title. He also earned inclusion on the Munster team in the Railway Cup.

== Personal life and death ==
Flannelly was born in Waterford in February 1930. His Castlebar-born father, Matt, enjoyed a distinguished sporting career with the Galway senior football team and lined out in the 1919 All-Ireland final defeat by Kildare. Flannelly qualified as a printer and worked for many years at Croke Printers in Waterford.

Flannelly died on 11 September 2021, aged 91.

== Honours ==
Mount Sion

- Waterford Senior Hurling Championship: 1948, 1949, 1951, 1953, 1954, 1955, 1956, 1957, 1958, 1959, 1960, 1961, 1963, 1964, 1965
- Waterford Senior Football Championship: 1953, 1955, 1956, 1959
- Waterford Minor Hurling Championship: 1946, 1947, 1948

Waterford

- All-Ireland Senior Hurling Championship: 1959
- Munster Senior Hurling Championship: 1957, 1959, 1963
- National Hurling League: 1962-63
- All-Ireland Minor Hurling Championship: 1948 (c)
- Munster Minor Hurling Championship: 1948 (c)

Sporting positions
Preceded by Joe Condon	Waterford Senior Hurling Captain; 1964	Succeeded by
Achievements
Preceded by Paddy Kenny	All-Ireland Minor Hurling Final winning captain 1948	Succeeded by John O'Grady
