= Jack Mangan =

Irish Gaelic footballer

Personal information
- Native name: Seán Ó Mangáin (Irish)
- Born: 6 May 1927 Tuam, County Galway, Ireland
- Died: 17 September 2013 (aged 86) Wolverhampton, England
- Occupation: Salesman
- Height: 5 ft 11 in (180 cm)

Sport
- Sport: Gaelic football
- Position: Goalkeeper
Clubs
- Years: Club
- Tuam Stars; Ballymun Kickhams
Inter-county
- Years: County
- 1948-1958: Galway
Inter-county titles
- Connacht titles: 4
- All-Irelands: 1
- NFL: 0

Jack Mangan (6 May 1927 – 17 September 2013) was an Irish former Gaelic footballer who played as a goalkeeper for the Galway senior team.

Mangan is regarded as one of Galway's greatest-ever goalkeepers. He made his debut for the team during the 1948 and was a regular member of the starting fifteen until his retirement due to injury a decade later. During that time he won one All-Ireland winners' medal and four Connacht winners' medals. In 1956 he captained the side to the All-Ireland title.

At club level Mangan enjoyed a successful career with Tuam Stars in Galway and Ballymun Kickhams in Dublin.

Sporting positions
| Preceded by | Galway Senior Football Captain; 1956 | Succeeded by Jack Mahon |
Achievements
| Preceded by John Dowling (Kerry) | All-Ireland Senior Football Final winning captain 1956 | Succeeded by Dermot O'Brien (Louth) |
