= Ollie Reilly =

Irish Gaelic footballer

Personal information
- Native name: Oilibhéar Ó Raghallaigh (Irish)
- Born: 1936 Ardee, County Louth, Ireland
- Died: 4 April 2009 (aged 72) Ardee, County Louth, Ireland
- Occupation: Farmer

Sport
- Sport: Gaelic football
- Position: Right corner-back
Club
- Years: Club
- Hunterstown Rovers
Club titles
- Louth titles: 0
Inter-county
- Years: County
- 1955-1962: Louth
Inter-county titles
- Leinster titles: 1
- All-Irelands: 1
- NFL: 0

Oliver Reilly (1936 – 4 April 2009) was an Irish Gaelic footballer. His league and championship career with the Louth senior team lasted seven seasons from 1955 until 1962.

Born in Ardee, County Louth, Reilly was raised in a strong Gaelic football household. His father, Stephen Reilly, won a Leinster medal with the Louth junior team in 1912.

Reilly first played competitive Gaelic football with the Hunterstown Rovers club. He won a county minor championship medal in 1954 before later joining the club's adult team. Reilly won a county junior championship medal in 1959.

Reilly made his first appearance on the inter-county scene as a member of the Louth minor team in 1954. He later joined the Louth junior team before making his senior debut during the 1955-56 league. Over the following seven seasons Reilly enjoyed much success, culminating with the winning of a set of All-Ireland and Leinster medals in 1957. A gall stones operation hastened his retirement from inter-county Gaelic football in 1962. He is the father of Hollywood film director Fergal Reilly.

== Honours ==
Hunterstown Rovers

- Louth Junior 2 Football Championship (1): 1954
- Ranafast Cup (Junior 2 Football League) (1): 1954
- Louth Junior Football Championship (1): 1959
- Louth Minor Football Championship (1): 1954

Louth

- All-Ireland Senior Football Championship (1): 1957
- Leinster Senior Football Championship (1): 1957
