= Scór =

Division of the Gaelic Athletic Association

- Formation: 1969; 57 years ago
- Founder: Derry Gowen; Anthony Williamson
- Founded at: Fermoy, County Cork
- Parent organization: Gaelic Athletic Association

Scór (pronounced [sˠkoːɾˠ], meaning "Score") is a division of the Gaelic Athletic Association charged with promotion of cultural activities, and the name of a series of annual competitions in such activities.

Rule 4 of the GAA's official guide reads:

"The Association shall actively support the Irish language, traditional Irish dancing, music, song, and other aspects of Irish culture. It shall foster an awareness and love of the national ideals in the people of Ireland, and assist in promoting a community spirit through its clubs."

The group was formally founded by Derry Gowen and Anthony Williamson in Fermoy, in 1969, and is promoted through various GAA clubs throughout Ireland (as well as some clubs outside Ireland). Their events are broadcast on TG4.

== Structure ==
Scór is a GAA competition that combines all the colour and rivalry of Gaelic Games with the social/fun element of Ireland's traditional past-times. The competition was established by the GAA in 1969 with the aim of promoting Ireland's traditional pastimes and culture while offering club members the chance to meet up, have fun and represent their club during the winter months while Football and Hurling had ceased.

There are eight events/disciplines in Scór that cover all aspects of Irish culture:

1. Rince Fóirne (Céilí Dancing)
2. Amhránaíocht Aonair (Solo Singing)
3. Ceol Uirlise (Instrumental Music)
4. Aithriseoirecht/Scealaíocht (Recitation/Storytelling)
5. Bailéad Ghrúpa (Ballad Group)
6. Nuachleas (Novelty Act)
7. Rince Seit (Set Dancing)
8. Tráth na gCeisteanna (Question Time)

The competition is divided into two age levels, Scór na nÓg, for young people under 17 and Scór Sinsir, for those over 17, while some counties host Scór na bPáistí for primary/national school children.

Just like the All-Ireland Football and Hurling Championships, clubs taking part in Scór first run off competitions among the club’s own members with the winners going forward to Divisional/District Board stage where deemed necessary, and then on to the County Final. The winners go on to the Provincial final and finally on to the All-Ireland Final.

The All Ireland Scór champions are presented with their medals by the President of the GAA. Winners are All-Ireland champions in their own right in the same way as All-Ireland Senior Football or Hurling Final winners.
