= Paul Doherty (Gaelic footballer) =

Irish Gaelic footballer

Personal information
- Native name: Pól Ó Dochartaigh (Irish)
- Born: Galway, Ireland
- Occupation: Chartered Accountant

Sport
- Sport: Gaelic Football
- Position: Goalkeeper
Club
- Years: Club
- 2002–2010: Tuam Stars
Inter-county
Years	County	Apps (scores)
2007–2010	Galway	7 (0-0)
Inter-county titles
- Connacht titles: 1

Paul Doherty is a former inter-county goalkeeper for Galway.

Doherty made his Championship debut against Mayo in May 2007 and has been a first choice for the county in the Championship ever since. In the 2007 Connacht SFC semi-final against Leitrim, the then manager of Galway, Peter Forde, praised Doherty after Donal Brennan's shot was stopped by Doherty. "The opposition is always going to have chances during a 70 minute game. That is what we expect our goalkeeper to do, to pull off a great save like that when it is needed and thankfully he did that. It is important that when the opposition get in on goal that you have a goalie who can pull off a save like that and he proved that today," Forde said. Galway won the game by 0-17 to 1-10

He has played in two Connacht finals, in 2007, losing to Sligo, and in 2008, defeating Mayo.

Doherty plays his club football with the Tuam Stars. His brother, Conor, was a member of Galway's victorious All-Ireland Minor Championship team in 2007.
