= Nealie Duggan =

Irish Gaelic footballer (1923–1996)

Personal information
- Native name: Conchúr Ó Dúgáin (Irish)
- Nickname: Nealie
- Born: 1923 Urhan, County Cork, Ireland
- Died: 22 December 1996 (aged 73) Wilton, Cork, Ireland
- Occupation: County council employee
- Height: 6 ft 1 in (185 cm)

Sport
- Sport: Gaelic Football
- Position: Centre-forward
Clubs
- Years: Club
- Urhan; Beara; St. Patrick's; Lees
Club titles
- Cork titles: 1
Inter-county
Years	County	Apps (scores)
1942-1957	Cork	30 (1-30)
Inter-county titles
- Munster titles: 5
- All-Irelands: 0
- NFL: 2

Cornelius Duggan (1923 - 22 December 1996), known as Nealie Duggan, was an Irish Gaelic footballer who played for club sides Urhan, St. Patrick's and Lees, divisional side Beara, at inter-county level with the Cork senior football team and with Munster.

== Career ==
Duggan first came to Gaelic football prominence with the Urhan junior team, while also securing selection to the Beara divisional team. He consecutive Beara Junior Championship titles with Urhan in 1943-44, by which time he had also been added to the Cork senior football team. Duggan won his first Munster Championship title in 1943 and, in spite of being included on the team at the start of the 1945 provincial campaign, he was later suspended for allegedly playing illegally in Kerry. The suspension cost him an All-Ireland medal as Cork won that year's title after a defeat of Cavan. Duggan soon re-joined the team, winning further provincial medals in 1949 and 1952, as well as his first National League title in the latter year. After winning a County Junior Championship title with the St. Patrick's club, he later transferred to Lees Football Club and won a County Senior Championship medal in 1955. Duggan enjoyed further inter-county success throughout the 1956-57 seasons, winning a second National League medal and consecutive Munster Championship medals. The ultimate success eluded him as Cork suffered back-to-back All-Ireland final defeats to Galway and Louth, with Duggan captaining the team on the second occasion. He was also a regular on the Munster team and won two Railway Cup titles.

== Personal life and death ==
Duggan was born in Urhan, County Cork. He relocated to Cork in the late 1940s, eventually settling in Bishopstown, and worked with Cork County Council. Duggan died at Cork University Hospital on 22 December 1996.

== Honours ==
Urhan

- Beara Junior Football Championship: 1943, 1944

St. Patrick's

- Cork Junior Football Championship: 1949
- City Junior Football Championship: 1949

Lees

- Cork Senior Football Championship: 1955

Cork

- Munster Senior Football Championship: 1943, 1949, 1952, 1956, 1957
- National Football League: 1951-52, 1955-56

Munstwr

- Railway Cup: 1948, 1949,

Sporting positions
Preceded by Donal O'Sullivan	Cork Senior Football Captain; 1957	Succeeded by Paddy O'Driscoll
