= 1961 All-Ireland Minor Football Championship =

Gaelic football competition

Championship details

All-Ireland Champions
- Winning team: Cork (1st win)
- Captain: Ned Coughlan

All-Ireland Finalists
- Losing team: Mayo

Provincial Champions
- Munster: Cork
- Leinster: Dublin
- Ulster: Armagh
- Connacht: Mayo

The 1961 All-Ireland Minor Football Championship was the 30th staging of the All-Ireland Minor Football Championship, the Gaelic Athletic Association's premier inter-county Gaelic football tournament for boys under the age of 18.

Galway entered the championship as defending champions, however, they were defeated in the Connacht Championship.

On 24 September 1961, Cork won the championship following a 3-7 to 0-5 defeat of Mayo in the All-Ireland final. This was their first All-Ireland title.

== Results ==
=== Connacht Minor Football Championship ===
Quarter-final

Mayo 1-14 Galway 2-8 Castlebar.

Semi-finals

Mayo 2-11 Leitrim 1-3.

Sligo 0-13 Roscommon 1-7.

Final

Mayo 5-8 Sligo 0-5 Ballina.

=== All-Ireland Minor Football Championship ===
Semi-finals

6 August 1961 Semi-final	Cork	0-12 - 1-09	Armagh	Croke Park, Dublin

20 August 1961 Semi-final	Mayo	1-10 - 2-06	Dublin	Croke Park, Dublin

Final

24 September 1961 Final	Cork	3-07 - 0-05	Mayo	Croke Park, Dublin
	T Monaghan 2-1, P Hayes 1-1, D Philpott 0-3, D Barrett 0-1, M Archer 0-1.		J Madden 0-2, J Warde 0-1, M Connaughton 0-1, J Nealon 0-1.	Referee: B Smith (Meath)
