= Dan O'Neill (Gaelic footballer) =

Irish Gaelic footballer (1933–2015)

Personal information
- Native name: Dónall Ó Néill (Irish)
- Born: 1933 Castlebar, County Mayo, Ireland
- Died: 8 January 2015 (aged 81) Kingston, Galway, Ireland
- Occupations: Garda; Calor Gas Area Manager; Regional Manager at Ireland West Tourism

Sport
- Sport: Gaelic football
- Position: Midfield
Clubs
- Years: Club
- Castlebar Mitchels; Oliver Plunketts; St. Dominic's; Naomh Mhuire; Fr. Griffins
Club titles
- Mayo titles: 5
Inter-county
- Years: County
- 1953–1956 1957–1962 1963: Mayo; Louth; Mayo
Inter-county titles
- Connacht titles: 1
- Leinster titles: 1
- All-Irelands: 1
- NFL: 1

Daniel O'Neill (1933 – 8 January 2015) was an Irish Gaelic footballer. His league and championship career at senior level with the Mayo and Louth county teams lasted a decade from 1953 until 1963.

Born in Castlebar, County Mayo, O'Neill first played competitive Gaelic football with the Castlebar Mitchels club. He was just eighteen-years-old when he won the first of four successive county senior championship medals in 1951. O'Neill first appeared on the inter-county scene as a member of the Mayo junior team. He won a Connacht medal in that grade in 1953, before making his senior debut during the 1953–54 league. O'Neill won a Connacht and National League medals with the team, however a dispute with the County Board over expenses saw him walk away from the side in 1956.

O'Neill played with several clubs in Drogheda, County Louth after moving there in 1954 to serve as a member of the Garda Síochána. After leaving the Mayo set-up, he was soon selected on the Louth senior team and won All-Ireland and Leinster medals in 1957, while playing club football with St Dominic's. In 1959, he joined south-side Drogheda club Naomh Mhuire and played in the 1961 Louth Senior Football Championship final, losing to Newtown Blues.

His last appearance for Louth came in a 1962 Leinster Championship defeat to Dublin. He subsequently returned to Mayo and played his final game for the county side in 1963. That same year he won a fifth county SFC medal after rejoining Castlebar Mitchels. By then he had resigned from the Garda Siochana to join Calor Gas as Area Manager. He would later work in management positions with Ireland West Tourism. O'Neill ended his club career with Fr. Griffins in Galway.

In 2008, his autobiography 'Divided Loyalties' was released.

== Honours ==
Castlebar Mitchels

- Mayo Senior Football Championship (5): 1951, 1952, 1953, 1954, 1963

Mayo

- Connacht Senior Football Championship (1): 1955
- National Football League (1): 1953–54
- Connacht Junior Football Championship (1): 1953

Naomh Mhuire

- Old Gaels Cup (Subsidiary league) (1): 1961

Louth

- All-Ireland Senior Football Championship (1): 1957
- Leinster Senior Football Championship (1): 1957
