= Ned Coughlan =

Irish Gaelic footballer

Personal information
- Native name: Éamonn Ó Cochlainn (Irish)
- Born: 1943 (age 82–83) Mitchelstown, County Cork, Ireland

Sport
- Sport: Gaelic football
- Position: Centre-forward
Club
- Years: Club
- Mitchelstown
Club titles
- Cork titles: 0
Inter-county*
| Years | County | Apps (scores) |
| 1962-1965 | Cork | 5 (1-2) |
Inter-county titles
- Munster titles: 0
- All-Irelands: 0
- NFL: 0
- *Inter County team apps and scores correct as of 01:09, 15 July 2014.

Ned Coughlan (born 1943) is an Irish retired Gaelic footballer who played as a centre-forward for the Cork senior football team.

Born in Mitchelstown, County Cork, Coughlan first played competitive football in his youth. He arrived on the inter-county scene at the age of seventeen when he first linked up with the Cork minor team, before later joining the under-21 and junior sides. He made his senior debut during the 1962 championship and was a regular member of the starting fifteen for a brief period. He was a Munster runner-up on three occasions.

At club level Coughlan won numerous championship medals with Mitchelstown.

Throughout his career Coughlan played just five championship games for Cork. His retirement came following the conclusion of the 1965 championship.

== Honours ==
=== Team ===
Mitchelstown

- Cork Intermediate Football Championship (1): 1965
- Cork Junior Football Championship (1): 1961
- Cork Minor Football Championship (1): 1960

Avondhu

- Cork Senior Football Championship (1): 1961

Cork

- Munster Junior Football Championship (1): 1962
- Munster Under-21 Football Championship (1): 1963
- All-Ireland Minor Football Championship (1): 1961
- Munster Minor Football Championship (2): 1960, 1961

Achievements
| Preceded by Seán Cleary (Galway) | All-Ireland Minor Football Final winning captain 1961 | Succeeded by Jimmy O'Mahony (Kerry) |
