= Richard Kissane =

Irish hurler

Personal information
- Native name: Risteard Ó Cíosáin (Irish)
- Born: 1868 Ballyduff, County Kerry, Ireland
- Died: Unknown
- Occupation: General labourer

Sport
- Sport: Hurling
Club
- Years: Club
- Ballyduff
Club titles
- Kerry titles: 1
Inter-county
- Years: County
- Kerry
Inter-county titles
- Munster titles: 1
- All-Irelands: 1

Richard Kissane (1868-?) was an Irish hurler who played for the Kerry senior team.

Kissane was a regular member of the starting twenty-one during Kerry's most successful hurling period shortly after the foundation of the Gaelic Athletic Association and the start of the inter-county championship. During his career he won one All-Ireland medal and one Munster medal.

At club level Kissane was a one-time county club championship medalist with Ballyduff.
