= Billy O'Neill (dual player) =

Irish hurler and Gaelic footballer

Personal information
- Native name: Liam Ó Néill (Irish)
- Born: 1929 Carrigtwohill, County Cork, Ireland
- Died: 2 January 2015
- Occupation: Army officer
- Height: 5 ft 10 in (178 cm)

Sport
- Football Position: Left wing-forward
- Hurling Position: Full-back
Clubs
- Years: Club
- Carrigtwohill; An Chéad Cath
Club titles
	Football	Hurling
Galway titles	0	0
Inter-county
- Years: County
- 1951 1952–1958: Cork; Galway
Inter-county titles
	Football	Hurling
Connacht Titles	3	0
All-Ireland Titles	1	0
League titles	1	0

William O'Neill (1929 – 2 January 2015) was an Irish Gaelic footballer and hurler who played in various positions for both the Cork and Galway senior teams.

A dual player at the highest level, he joined the Cork panel in 1951 but later lined out with Galway until his retirement in 1958. He won one All-Ireland SFC medal, three Connacht SFC medals and one National Football League medal.

At club level O'Neill played with Carrigtwohill in Cork and an Chéad Cath in Galway.
