= 1951 All-Ireland Minor Football Championship =

Gaelic football competition

All-Ireland Champions
- Winning team: Roscommon (3rd win)

All-Ireland Finalists
- Losing team: Armagh

Provincial Champions
- Munster: Kerry
- Leinster: Louth
- Ulster: Armagh
- Connacht: Roscommon

The 1951 All-Ireland Minor Football Championship was the 20th staging of the All-Ireland Minor Football Championship, the Gaelic Athletic Association's premier inter-county Gaelic football tournament for boys under the age of 18.

Kerry entered the championship as defending champions, however, they were defeated by Armagh in the All-Ireland semi-final.

On 23 September 1951, Roscommon won the championship following a 2-7 to 1-5 defeat of Armagh in the All-Ireland final. This was their third All-Ireland title overall and their first in seven championship seasons.

== Results ==
=== Connacht Minor Football Championship ===
(Roscommon awarded title after objection)

Quarter-final

Mayo 1-4 Sligo 0-5 Ballymote.

Semi-finals

Roscommon 3-5 Mayo 0-2

Galway 2-8 Leitrim 2-5

Final

Roscommon	2–04 - 1–08	Galway

=== Leinster Minor Football Championship ===
22 July 1951 Final	Louth	3–09 - 2–05	Westmeath	Croke Park, Dublin
	K. Beahan 1-4, P. McKevitt 1-2, H. Rogers 1-0, S. Cunningham 0-3		P. Dunne 2-0, M. Gunning 0-3, F. Eivers, J. Quinn 0-1 each	Referee: J. Tunney (Dublin)

GK	1	Pat McMahon (Dowdallshill)
RCB	2	George Carroll (St Dominic's)
FB	3	Fintan Wynne (St Bride's)
LCB	4	Brendan Donohue (Dundalk Gaels)
RHB	5	Eugene King (St Dominic's)
CHB	6	Michael Brennan (Ardee Minors) (c)
LHB	7	Peter Judge (Newtown Blues)
MF	8	Benny Toal (Clan na Gael)
MF	9	Pat McKevitt (Clan na Gael)
RHF	10	Harry Rogers (Ardee Minors)
CHF	11	Seán Cunningham (Dundalk Young Irelands)
LHF	12	Kevin Beahan (Ardee Minors)
RCF	13	Niall Craven (Roche Emmets)
FF	14	Peter McDonnell (Ardee Minors)
LCF	15	Phil Hearty (Dundalk Young Irelands)
Substitutes:

GK	1	J. Reynolds (Athlone)
RCB	2	P. Hughes (Fore)
FB	3	L. Moran (Tubberclair)
LCB	4	E. Cahill (Multyfarnham Franciscan College)
RHB	5	D. Egan (St Finian's College)
CHB	6	J. Clarke (Multyfarnham Franciscan College)
LHB	7	G. Burke (Multyfarnham Franciscan College)
MF	8	J. Butler (Athlone)
MF	9	F. Eivers (Multyfarnham Franciscan College)
RHF	10	M. Gunning (Moate All Whites)
CHF	11	P. Dunne (Kinnegad)
LHF	12	J. Kirrane (Ballymore)
RCF	13	D. O'Sullivan (Mullingar)
FF	14	J. Quinn (Athlone)
LCF	15	P. Walshe (Mullingar)
Substitutes:
	16	A. Kiernan (St Finian's College) for Cahill

=== Munster Minor Football Championship ===
Final

Kerry	0–07 - 0–03	Cork

=== Ulster Minor Football Championship ===
Final

Armagh	3–01 - 1–04	Cavan

=== All-Ireland Minor Football Championship ===
==== Semi-Finals ====
(Armagh/Kerry went to a replay)

23 September 1951	Armagh	2–03 - 0–07	Kerry	Croke Park, Dublin

25 November 1951	Roscommon	2–05 - 1–03	Louth	CBS Roscommon

==== Final ====
(Croke Park, Dublin)

16 December 1951

Roscommon	2–07 – 1–05	Armagh
(HT: 1–04 - 1–03)

Referee: Peter McDermott (Meath)

GK	1	P. Muldoon
RCB	2	O. Murray
FB	3	J. Lynch
LCB	4	E. O'Connor
RHB	5	B. Molloy (c)
CHB	6	T. Finnegan
LHB	7	G. Healy
MF	8	H. Connolly
MF	9	J. Rafferty
RHF	10	J. O'Brien
CHF	11	J. Campbell
LHF	12	E. Duignan
RCF	13	L. Duffy
FF	14	M. Shivnan
LCF	15	H. Penny
Substitutes:
	16	M. Kelly

GK	1	G. Murphy
RCB	2	G. Donnelly
FB	3	B. Seeley
LCB	4	T. Moore
RHB	5	D. Skelton
CHB	6	E. Quinn
LHB	7	M. Grimley
MF	8	S. McCreesh
MF	9	B. O'Neill
RHF	10	T. Dillon
CHF	11	J. Hanratty
LHF	12	J. Crossey
RCF	13	J. Kiernan
FF	14	P. McArdle
LCF	15	D. McCorry
Substitutes:
