= Alfie Monk =

Irish Gaelic footballer (1933–2020)

Personal information
- Native name: Ailfrid Ó Manacháin (Irish)
- Born: 1933 Drogheda, County Louth, Ireland
- Died: 30 March 2020 (aged 86) Drogheda, County Louth, Ireland

Sport
- Sport: Gaelic football
- Position: Left wing-forward
Clubs
- Years: Club
- Julianstown; St Patrick's; Naomh Mhuire
Club titles
- Louth titles: 1
Inter-county
- Years: County
- 1952 1953–1963: Meath; Louth
Inter-county titles
- Leinster titles: 2
- All-Irelands: 1
- NFL: 0

Alfie Monk (1933 – 30 March 2020) was an Irish Gaelic footballer who played with Meath GAA clubs Julianstown and St Patrick's and also Naomh Mhuire of Drogheda in County Louth.

At inter-county level he played with the Meath junior football team and the Louth senior football team, winning All-Ireland honours with both counties. He usually lined out as a left wing-forward.

== Honours ==
Julianstown

- Meath Minor Football Championship (3): 1947, 1948, 1949

St Patrick's

- Meath Intermediate Football Championship (1): 1951

Naomh Mhuire

- Louth Senior Football Championship (1): 1953

Louth

- All-Ireland Senior Football Championship (1): 1957
- Leinster Senior Football Championship (2): 1953, 1957
- O'Byrne Cup (1): 1963

Meath

- All-Ireland Junior Football Championship (1): 1952
- Leinster Junior Football Championship (1): 1952
