= Seán Óg Flood =

Cavan and Louth Gaelic footballer

Personal information
- Native name: Seán Óg Ó Maoltuile (Irish)
- Born: 1935 (age 90–91) Dundalk, County Louth, Ireland
- Occupation: ESB salesman

Sport
- Sport: Gaelic football
- Position: Goalkeeper
Clubs
- Years: Club
- Dundalk Young Irelands; Ballinagh
Club titles
- Louth titles: 0
Inter-county
- Years: County
- 1955–1960 1961–1964: Louth; Cavan
Inter-county titles
- Ulster titles: 1
- Leinster titles: 1
- All-Irelands: 1
- NFL: 0

Seán Óg Flood (born 1935) is an Irish former Gaelic footballer. His league and championship careers as a goalkeeper with the senior Louth and Cavan county teams lasted ten seasons from 1955 until 1964.

A son of Séamus Flood, renowned Louth GAA official and former county goalkeeper, Seán was born in Dundalk, County Louth. He first played competitive Gaelic football with the Dundalk Young Irelands club at minor level. He won a North Louth minor championship medal in 1950, before joining the senior team in 1953.

Flood first appeared on the inter-county scene as a member of the Louth Minor team in 1953. He won a Leinster medal that year before being added to the senior panel in 1955. Flood made his league debut in 1956 and was handed his first championship start in 1957. His debut championship season saw him win a set of All-Ireland and Leinster medals. After transferring to the Cavan senior team in 1961, Flood went on to win an Ulster and Dr. McKenna Cup medals. He retired from inter-county Gaelic football in 1964.

As a member of the Leinster inter-provincial team, Flood won a Railway Cup medal in 1959.

== Honours ==
Dundalk Young Irelands

- North Louth Minor Football League (1): 1949
- North Louth Minor Football Championship (1): 1950
- Old Gaels Cup (1): 1957

Louth

- All-Ireland Senior Football Championship (1): 1957
- Leinster Senior Football Championship (1): 1957
- Leinster Minor Football Championship (1): 1953

Cavan

- Ulster Senior Football Championship (1): 1962
- Dr McKenna Cup (1): 1962
- Ulster Junior Football Championship (1): 1962

Leinster

- Railway Cup (1): 1959
