= Jack Mahon (Gaelic footballer) =

Galway Gaelic footballer

Personal information
- Born: 1933 Galway, Ireland
- Died: 2005 (aged 71–72)

Sport
- Sport: Gaelic football
- Position: Centre-Back
Club
- Years: Club
- 1947–1962: Dunmore McHales
Club titles
- Galway titles: 3
Inter-county
- Years: County
- 1951–1961: Galway
Inter-county titles
- Connacht titles: 6
- All-Irelands: 1

Jack Mahon (1933–2005) was an Irish Gaelic footballer who played at senior level for the Galway county team in the 1950s.

A native of Dunmore, where his father was a national school teacher, Mahon had a distinguished career as a player, at the highest level.

He first made a mark as a young player, winning a County Minor title with Dunmore McHales in 1949 and a Connacht Colleges championship with St Jarlath's College, Tuam, in 1950. It was at a time when there was no All-Ireland Colleges championship played, so he did not get the opportunity to follow up on the Tuam school's Hogan Cup victory of 1947, inspired by his close friend Seán Purcell.

Mahon won the first of three County Senior Championships in 1953, with a Dunmore McHales team captained by his 19-year-old brother Brian, who has since lived in Tuam. Mahon's other two Galway SFC medals were won in 1961 (ending the Tuam Stars' seven in-a-row) and 1963.

Mahon was selected for the Galway senior football team in 1951. He played on until 1961, winning an All-Ireland SFC medal in 1956, a National League medal in 1957, as captain, and six Connacht championships including five-in-a-row from 1956 to 1960 - he was one of four players who lined out in all five finals; the others were Seán Purcell, Mattie McDonagh and Joe Young.

He won Railway Cup medals with Connacht in 1957 and 1958 and, also in 1958, he played at centre half-back on the Combined Universities team which defeated the Rest of Ireland. His team-mates included Seán Purcell and they were in opposition to some of their best friends, Frank Stockwell, Tom "Pook" Dillon, Mick Greally, John Nallen and Packy McGarty.

Following Mahon's retirement from senior football in 1961, Jack went into football administration, serving as Galway Football Board chairman in the 1980s, as P.R.O. since, and later he was given an honorary position: President of the County GAA Board. He was also a writer and sports historian, specilaising in the GAA, having written a total of 19 books about Gaelic football and sport in general.

He spent many years as principal of Galway's Moonageeshia Community College.

Mahon was a family man and father of six children: John, Lisa, Genevieve, Pearse, Karl and Branwell. He died on 23 October 2005 after a long illness. His death, in his seventies, came shortly after Purcell's.
