= Pádraig Tyers =

Irish Gaelic footballer

Personal information
- Native name: Pádraig Tyers (Irish)
- Born: 20 October 1925 Touraneena, County Waterford, Ireland
- Died: 19 February 2010 (aged 84) Bishopstown, Cork, Ireland
- Occupation: Secondary school teacher
- Height: 6 ft 0 in (183 cm)

Sport
- Sport: Gaelic football
- Position: Goalkeeper
Club
- Years: Club
- Lees
Club titles
- Cork titles: 1
College
- Years: College
- University College Cork
College titles
- Sigerson titles: 2
- Fitzgibbon titles: 1
Inter-county
Years	County	Apps (scores)
1954–1956	Cork	8 (0–0)
Inter-county titles
- Munster titles: 1
- All-Irelands: 0
- NFL: 1

Pádraig Tyers (20 October 1925 – 19 February 2010) was an Irish Gaelic footballer. He played for his local club Lees and was a member of the Cork senior county team from 1954 until 1956. Tyers also had a distinguished career as an Irish language scholar, author and educator.
