= Paddy Harrington =

Irish Gaelic footballer

Patrick Harrington
Personal information
- Native name: Pádraig Ó hArrachtáin (Irish)
- Born: 1933 Ardgroom, County Cork, Ireland
- Died: 11 July 2005 (aged 72) St. James's Hospital, Dublin, Ireland
- Occupation: Garda Síochána
- Height: 6 ft 0 in (183 cm)

Sport
- Sport: Gaelic football
- Position: Full-back
Clubs
- Years: Club
- Ardgroom; Garda
Club titles
- Cork titles: 0
Inter-county
- Years: County
- 1950s–1960s: Cork
Inter-county titles
- Munster titles: 2
- All-Irelands: 0
- NFL: 1

Patrick Harrington (1933 – July 2005), known as Paddy Harrington, was an Irish sportsman. He played Gaelic football with his local club Ardgroom in Cork and Garda in Dublin. Harrington was also a member of the Cork senior inter-county team in the 1950s and 1960s. His son, Pádraig Harrington is a professional golfer and has won three major championships.

Harrington died in St. James's Hospital on 11 July 2005 from esophageal cancer at the age of 72.
