= 1955 All-Ireland Junior Football Championship =

All Ireland Champions
- Winners: Cork (3rd win)
- Captain: Owenie McAuliffe

All Ireland Runners-up
- Runners-up: Warwickshire

Provincial Champions
- Munster: Cork
- Leinster: Dublin
- Ulster: Derry
- Connacht: Mayo

The 1955 All-Ireland Junior Hurling Championship was the 34th staging of the All-Ireland Junior Championship since its establishment by the Gaelic Athletic Association in 1912.

Kerry entered the championship as the defending champions, however, they were beaten by Cork in the Munster semi-final.

The All-Ireland final was played on 2 October 1955 at Páirc na hÉireann in Birmingham, between Cork and Warwickshire, in what was their second ever meeting in the final and a first in four years. Cork won the match by 3–09 to 1–05 to claim their third championship title overall and a first tile since 1953.

== All-Ireland Junior Football Championship ==
=== All-Ireland semi-finals ===
28 August 1955 Semi-final	Cork	2-05 - 0-06	Dublin	Cork Athletic Grounds

28 August 1955 Semi-final	Mayo	0-09 - 2-06	Derry	Fr. O'Hara Park

=== All-Ireland home final ===
18 September 1955 Home final	Cork	3-10 - 1-07	Derry	Páirc Tailteann

=== All-Ireland final ===
2 October 1955 Final	Warwickshire	1-05 - 3-09	Cork	Páirc na hÉireann
