= Denis Kelleher =

Irish Gaelic footballer

Denis "Toots" Kelleher
Personal information
- Native name: Donncha Céileachair (Irish)
- Nickname: Toots
- Born: 1931 Millstreet, County Cork, Ireland
- Died: 13 January 2002 (aged 70) Wellington Road, Cork, Ireland
- Occupation: Cattle dealer
- Height: 5 ft 10 in (178 cm)

Sport
- Sport: Gaelic Football
- Position: Left corner-forward
Club
- Years: Club
- Millstreet
Club titles
- Cork titles: 0
Inter-county*
Years	County	Apps (scores)
1950-1958	Cork	24 (2-29)
Inter-county titles
- Munster titles: 2
- All-Irelands: 0
- NFL: 2
- *Inter County team apps and scores correct as of 01:28, 12 April 2012.

Denis "Toots" Kelleher (1931-2002) was an Irish former Gaelic footballer who played as a corner forward for the Cork senior team.

Kelleher made his debut for the team during the 1950 championship and was a regular member of the starting fifteen until his retirement following the completion of the 1958 championship. During that time he won two National League medals and two Munster medals but failed to capture an All-Ireland medal.

Kelleher also had a lengthy club career with Millstreet.
