= Niall FitzGerald (Gaelic footballer) =

Irish Gaelic footballer

Personal information
- Native name: Niall Mac Gearailt (Irish)
- Born: 1931 Macroom, County Cork, Ireland
- Died: 20 December 2012 (aged 81) Douglas, Cork, Ireland
- Occupation: Officer

Sport
- Sport: Gaelic Football
- Position: Centre-forward
Clubs
- Years: Club
- Collins; Macroom
Club titles
- Cork titles: 2
Inter-county*
Years	County	Apps (scores)
1950–1966	Cork	32 (2–30)
Inter-county titles
- Munster titles: 3
- All-Irelands: 0
- NFL: 1
- *Inter County team apps and scores correct as of 16:15, 31 December 2012.

Niall FitzGerald (1931 – 20 December 2012) was an Irish Gaelic footballer who played as a centre-forward for the Cork senior team.

FitzGerald joined the team during the 1950 championship and was a regular member of the starting fifteen until his retirement following the completion of the 1966 championship. During that time he won one National Football League medal and three Munster SFC medals. FitzGerald was an All-Ireland SFC runner-up on two occasions.

FitzGerald also had a lengthy club career with Collins and Macroom, winning two county club championship medals.
