= Tuam Stars GAA =

Gaelic football club in County Galway, Ireland

Tuam Stars
- Réalta Thuama
- Founded: 1907
- County: Galway
- Colours: Red and white
- Grounds: Tuam Stadium & Tuam Stars Grounds
- Coordinates: 53°30′32.32″N 8°50′13.38″W

Playing kits
Standard colours

Senior Club Championships
	All Ireland	Connacht champions	Galway champions
Football:	-	1	25

Tuam Stars is a Gaelic football club based in Tuam, County Galway. The club is a member of the Galway GAA branch of the Gaelic Athletic Association (GAA).

== History ==
In December 1887, Tuam's first football club was formed with the intention of playing association football. Soon, the club came under scrutiny to conform to the proper Gaelic standards of football. This change was opposed by a local newspaper, The Tuam Herald, which suggested a newspaper campaign to insist on a proper code of rules. Despite this, in February 1889, the club switched to Gaelic football under the name Tuam Stars. It played its first game on Saint Patrick's Day of that year.

The club won a number of Galway Senior Football Championship titles in the 1890s and early 1900s. Tuam Stars again won a number of back-to-back county senior titles in the 1950s and early 1960s. The most recent title was won in 1994.

== Notable players ==
- Seán Purcell - All-Ireland Medal winner with Galway in 1956 and member of the GAA Team of the Century and GAA and Galway Team of the Millennium
- Frank Stockwell - All-Ireland Medal winner with Galway in 1956 and member of the Galway Team of the Millennium
- Johnny Carey - 1971 All Star winner
- Jarlath Fallon - All-Ireland Medal winner with Galway in 1998 and 2001 and Footballer of the Year in 1998
- Conor Doherty - Minor All-Ireland winner 2007, U-21 All-Ireland winner 2011, current member of Galway Senior Football panel
- Paul Doherty - Former Inter-County goalkeeper for Galway
- Matt Flannelly
- Mick Garrett - All-Ireland Medal winner with Galway in 1964 and 1965
- John Lynch (Roscommon Gaelic footballer) - 2-time Connacht winner with Roscommon in the early 1960s
- Jack Mangan - Captain of the Galway All-Ireland winning team of 1956
- John Nallen - All-Ireland runner-up with Galway in 1959
- Gary O'Donnell - captained Galway to the Connacht title in 2016
- Pat O'Neill - All-Ireland runner-up with Galway in 1983
- P. J. Smyth - 1971 All Star winner
- Brian Talty - All-Ireland runner-up with Galway in 1983
- John Tobin - 1974 All Star winner

== Honours ==
Tournament	Wins	Latest Win
Galway Senior Football Championship	25	1994
Connacht Senior Club Football Championship	1	1994
Galway Senior Football Leagues	14	1980
Galway Minor Football Club Championship	11	1983
Galway U-21 County Championship	7	2008
Galway Junior Football Championship	15	2004
Kilmacud All-Ireland Sevens Football	1	2001
