= 1952 All-Ireland Minor Football Championship =

Gaelic football competition

All-Ireland Champions
- Winning team: Galway (1st win)

All-Ireland Finalists
- Losing team: Cavan

Provincial Champions
- Munster: Cork
- Leinster: Westmeath
- Ulster: Cavan
- Connacht: Galway

The 1952 All-Ireland Minor Football Championship was the 21st staging of the All-Ireland Minor Football Championship, the Gaelic Athletic Association's premier inter-county Gaelic football tournament for boys under the age of 18.

Roscommon entered the championship as defending champions, however, they were defeated in the Connacht Championship.

On 29 September 1952, Galway won the championship following a 2-9 to 1-6 defeat of Cavan in the All-Ireland final. This was their first All-Ireland title.

== Results ==
=== Connacht Minor Football Championship ===
Quarter-final

Galway 2-11 Leitrim 0-3.

Semi-finals

Sligo 3-5 Mayo 1-5.

Galway 2-3 Roscommon 1-3.

Final

Galway 4-11 Sligo 0-3 Castlebar.

=== All-Ireland Minor Football Championship ===
Semi-Finals

Final

| 29 September 1952 Final | Galway | 2-09 - 1-06 | Cavan | Croke Park, Dublin |

== Championship statistics ==
=== Miscellaneous ===
- In three of the provincial championships there are wins for teams after long absences. Cork and Westmeath win the respective Munster and Leinster titles for the first time since 1939, while Cavan claim the Ulster title for the first time since 1938.
