= Ardkeen, Waterford =

Ardkeen Ard Caoin
- Suburb
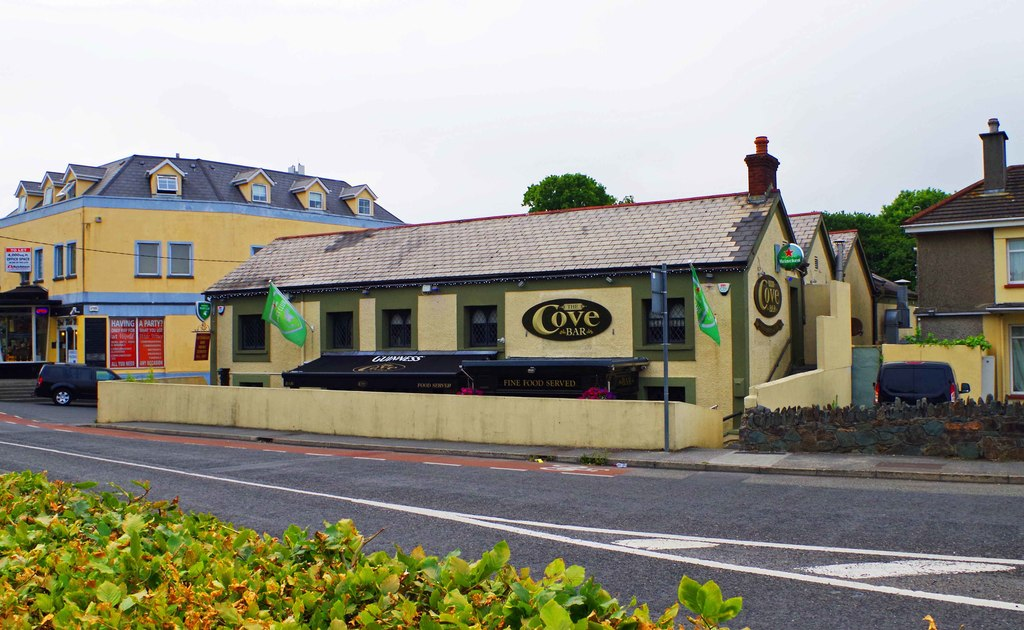
- Pub in Ardkeen, Waterford

- Location within Ireland
- Coordinates: 52.242°N 7.085°W
- Country: Ireland
- County: County Waterford

Ardkeen is an eastern suburb of Waterford, Ireland. It is the location of University Hospital Waterford, which became a general hospital in the late 1950s. Ardkeen also has two shopping centres (anchored by Lidl and Tesco) and a number of restaurants and pubs. Ardkeen Library, a branch of the Waterford City & County Library Service, is located within Ardkeen Shopping Centre.
