= 1951 All-Ireland Junior Football Championship =

All Ireland Champions
- Winners: Cork (1st win)
- Captain: J. J. Hinchion

All Ireland Runners-up
- Runners-up: Warwickshire
- Captain: D. Regan

Provincial Champions
- Munster: Cork
- Leinster: Dublin
- Ulster: Armagh
- Connacht: Mayo

The 1951 All-Ireland Junior Football Championship was the 30th staging of the All-Ireland Junior Championship since its establishment by the Gaelic Athletic Association in 1912.

Mayo entered the championship as the defending champions, however, they were beaten by Cork in the All-Ireland home final.

The All-Ireland final was played on 30 September 1951 at the Athletic Grounds in Cork, between Cork and Warwickshire, in what was their first ever meeting in the final. Cork won the match by 5–11 to 1–03 to claim their first ever championship title.

== All-Ireland Junior Football Championship ==
=== All-Ireland semi-finals ===
5 August 1951 Semi-final	Cork	2-09 - 0-07	Armagh	Cork Athletic Grounds

5 August 1951 Semi-final	Mayo	0-07 - 1-04	Dublin	Croke Park

26 August 1951 Semi-final replay	Mayo	3-08 - 2-07	Dublin	Pearse Park

=== All-Ireland home final ===
9 September 1951 Home final	Cork	1-05 - 1-02	Mayo	Croke Park

=== All-Ireland final ===
30 September 1951 Final	Cork	5-11 - 1-03	Warwickshire	Cork Athletic Grounds
