= 1953 All-Ireland Junior Football Championship =

All Ireland Champions
- Winners: Cork (2nd win)
- Captain: John Lyons

All Ireland Runners-up
- Runners-up: Lancashire

Provincial Champions
- Munster: Cork
- Leinster: Longford
- Ulster: Derry
- Connacht: Mayo

The 1953 All-Ireland Junior Hurling Championship was the 32nd staging of the All-Ireland Junior Championship since its establishment by the Gaelic Athletic Association in 1912.

Meath entered the championship as the defending champions, however, they were beaten in the Leinster Junior Championship.

The All-Ireland final was played on 10 October 1953 at the Athletic Grounds in Cork, between Cork and Lancashire, in what was their first ever meeting in the final. Cork won the match by 1–11 to 1–04 to claim their second championship title overall and a first tile since 1951.

== Results ==
=== All-Ireland Junior Football Championship ===
==== All-Ireland semi-finals ====
2 August 1953 Semi-final	Cork	2-08 - 2-07	Mayo	Croke Park

31 August 1953 Semi-final	Longford	2-05 - 2-04	Derry	Pearse Park

==== All-Ireland home final ====
13 September 1953 Home final	Cork	2-09 - 0-04	Longford	Croke Park

==== All-Ireland final ====
4 October 1953 Final	Cork	1-11 - 1-04	Lancashire	Cork Athletic Grounds
