= Frank Stockwell =

Galway Gaelic footballer

Personal information
- Nickname: Frankeen
- Born: 7 December 1928 Tuam, Galway, Ireland
- Died: 9 March 2009 (aged 80)
- Occupations: Painter and decorator
- Height: 5 ft 8 in (173 cm)

Sport
- Sport: Gaelic football
- Position: Full Forward
Club
- Years: Club
- 1947–1962: Tuam Stars
Club titles
- Galway titles: 10
Inter-county
Years	County	Apps (scores)
1948 1949 1950–1951 1952–1960	Galway; Louth; London; Galway	3 (2–02); 4 (1–05)
Inter-county titles
- Connacht titles: 7
- All-Irelands: 1
- NFL: 1

Frank Stockwell (7 December 1928 – 9 March 2009) was an Irish Gaelic footballer who played for his local club Tuam Stars and at senior level for the Galway, Louth and London county teams at various periods between 1949 and 1960.

He is regarded as Galway's greatest-ever full forward.

== Playing career ==
Stockwell began his inter-county career in 1949, at the age of 19. He continued to play for Galway until 1950, when he moved to Louth to play club football with. This led to Stockwell playing for the Louth seniors in 1950 and 1951. He returned to Galway for the 1952 Championship and revived a devastating attacking partnership with his Tuam Stars teammate and friend, Seán Purcell. Lining out at full forward, his ability to finish the chances created by Purcell brought considerable success to Galway in their overall consistency during the 1950s. In 1956, he won an All-Ireland Senior Football Championship, beating Cork in the final by 2–13 to 3–07. The final was most notable for Stockwell scoring a then-record 2-05. He was unlucky not to add to that tally, having a goal disallowed. Although this scoring tally was surpassed in later years, his achievement was more remarkable given that it occurred during a 60-minute final, a record that seems unlikely to ever be broken. He retired from inter-county football in 1960, having won every major honour possible.

At club level, the Stockwell and Purcell partnership proved to be even more effective than on the county scene as Tuam Stars dominated Galway football during the 1950s. Having won a minor title in 1946, Stockwell went on to win nine senior county titles with Tuam, including an remarkable seven-in-a-row from 1954 to 1960. Aside from his football career, Stockwell was also a Connacht champion boxer.

== Post-playing ==
After retiring from playing, Stockwell remained in the game. He was a selector and contributor to the Galway three-in-a-row team during 1964–66 and again from 1980 to 1981. As well being selector twice for his home club, Stockwell became president of Tuam Stars in 2006 remaining in the position before his death.

In 1999, a new road in Tuam was named after both Purcell and Stockwell. In April 2007, special plaques honouring three legendary Tuam GAA figures were unveiled at Tuam Stadium. The plaques were erected to mark the lifetime of dedicated service to the stadium by the late Miko Kelly, and the honour and glory brought to the famous venue, and to their town and county by the "Terrible Twins", Stockwell and Purcell.

Frank Stockwell died on 9 March 2009 at his home in Tuam, County Galway, from undisclosed causes, aged 80. A large crowd turned out in Tuam for the funeral, similar as it was for Purcell who predeceased Stockwell in 2005. John Joe Holleran, Galway football board chairmen said, "He was an iconic figure during what turned out to be a glorious period for Galway football. Generations have grown up in Galway hearing about their exploits and it was an privilege for us to see them in action."

== See also ==
- 1956 All-Ireland Senior Football Championship
