= Seán Purcell =

Galway Gaelic footballer

Personal information
- Native name: Seán Puircell (Irish)
- Nickname: The Master
- Born: 17 December 1928 Tuam, Galway, Ireland
- Died: 27 August 2005 (aged 76)

Sport
- Sport: Gaelic football
- Position: Centre forward
Club
- Years: Club
- 1947–1962: Tuam Stars
Club titles
- Galway titles: 10
Inter-county
- Years: County
- 1947–1961: Galway
Inter-county titles
- Connacht titles: 7
- All-Irelands: 1

Seán Purcell (17 December 1928– 27 August 2005), was a Gaelic footballer who played at senior level for the Galway county team.

Best known as a centre half-forward, he played in most outfield positions during his career. In 2009 he was named in the Sunday Tribune's list of the "125 Most Influential People In GAA History".

Born in Tuam, County Galway, Purcell was educated at Tuam Christian Brothers School and St Jarlath's College. He played in the St Jarlath's College side that won the Hogan Cup in 1947, beating St Patrick's Grammar School, Armagh in the final at Croke Park in Dublin. His nickname "The Master" originated when he taught at Strawberry Hill National School in Dunmore.

His footballing career spanned three decades, from the 1940s to the 1960s. Purcell formed a successful on-field partnership with Frank Stockwell at Galway, culminating in the team winning their fourth All-Ireland championship in 1956 and leading to their nickname as the "Terrible Twins".

Further successes in which Purcell was involved include winning the League title in 1957, three Railway Cups, one of which he captained, the 1950 Sigerson Cup, appearances with the Combined Universities side and ten county titles with the Tuam Stars, including seven in a row from 1954 to 1960.

His involvement in the GAA continued long after his playing days as he served in a number of positions as team mentor and administrator in Galway.

In 1984, the GAA's centenary year, he was named on the GAA's Football Team of the Century and the organisation's Football Team of the Millennium in 1999. In 1984 the Sunday Independent invited readers to vote for their Team of the Century. Purcell won more votes than any other player. In 1991 he was inducted into the All-Stars All-Time Hall of Fame. In 2003, he was named on the St Jarlath's All Stars team.

Seán Purcell died on 27 August 2005, aged 76. His son, Robert Purcell, married Tessa Robinson daughter of former Irish President Mary Robinson, in 2005.

His grandson Simon Carr is a professional tennis player. Another grandson, Sam McCartan, has played Gaelic football at senior level for Westmeath. In 2022, his teenage grandson, Rory Purcell, died.

== See also ==
- List of people on the postage stamps of Ireland
