= 1955–56 National Football League (Ireland) =

Gaelic football competition

League details
- Dates: October 1955 – 13 May 1956

League champions
- Winners: Cork (2nd win)
- Captain: Dermot O'Sullivan

League runners-up
- Runners-up: Meath
- Captain: Tom O'Brien

The 1955–56 National Football League was the 25th staging of the National Football League (NFL), an annual Gaelic football tournament for the Gaelic Athletic Association county teams of Ireland.

Cork beat Meath in the final.

== Results ==
=== Finals ===
13 May 1956
Final

Cork	0-8 – 0-7	Meath

Croke Park, Dublin
Attendance: 35,849
Referee: Patsy Geraghty (Galway)
