= 1957 All-Ireland Senior Football Championship =

Football championship

Championship details
- Dates: April 28 – September 22, 1957
- Teams: 29

All-Ireland Champions
- Winning team: Louth (3rd win)
- Captain: Dermot O'Brien
- Manager: Jim Quigley

All-Ireland Finalists
- Losing team: Cork
- Captain: Nealie Duggan
- Manager: Éamonn Young

Provincial Champions
- Munster: Cork
- Leinster: Louth
- Ulster: Tyrone
- Connacht: Galway

Championship statistics
- No. matches played: 33

The 1957 All-Ireland Senior Football Championship was the 71st staging of Ireland's premier Gaelic football knock-out competition.

Cork ended Galway's spell an All Ireland champions by just a point in the All Ireland semi-final.

Louth won their third, and so-far last, title.

== Results ==
=== Connacht Senior Football Championship ===
9 June 1957
Quarter-Final

| Roscommon | 0–7 – 0–6 | Mayo |
|---|---|---|
| | | M McLoughlin (0–2), PJ Downey (0–2), J O’Connell (0–1). Sub: M Stewart (0–1) |

St. Coman's Park, Roscommon
Attendance: 7,560

23 June 1957
Semi-Final

| Sligo | 2–1 – 1–8 | Leitrim |

Carrick-on-Shannon

30 June 1957
Semi-Final

| Galway | 0–13 – 0–7 | Roscommon |

St. Coman's Park, Roscommon

==== Connacht Final ====
14 July 1957
Final

| Galway | 4–8 – 0–4 | Leitrim |

Pearse Stadium, Galway
Attendance: 13,000

=== Leinster Senior Football Championship ===
28 April 1957
Preliminary Round

| Longford | 3–4 – 2–7 | Westmeath |

Cusack Park, Mullingar

5 May 1957
Preliminary Round Replay

| Longford | 1–10 – 0–6 | Westmeath |

Pearse Park, Longford

5 May 1957
Preliminary Round

| Louth | 3–6 – 0–4 | Carlow |

Páirc Tailteann, Navan

12 May 1957
Preliminary Round

| Wicklow | 3–6 – 1–6 | Laois |

Geraldine Park, Athy

19 May 1957
Quarter-Final

| Kildare | 2–10 – 1–3 | Offaly |
|---|---|---|
| P.Loughlin 1–2, S.Harrison 0–4, S.Aldridge 0–3, P.Wright 1–0, E.Hogan 0–1 |

O'Moore Park, Portlaoise
Attendance: 12000
Referee: E Moules (Wicklow)

26 May 1957
Quarter-Final

| Wicklow | 3–7 – 1–11 | Meath |

Geraldine Park, Athy

26 May 1957
Quarter-Final

| Louth | 1–12 – 0–9 | Wexford |

Croke Park, Dublin

2 June 1957
Quarter-Final

| Dublin | 2–10 – 1–4 | Longford |

Cusack Park, Mullingar

16 June 1957
Semi-Final

| Louth | 5–8 – 1–9 | Kildare |
|---|---|---|
| | | S.Harrison 1–7, E.Hogan, M.Bohane 0–1 |

Croke Park, Dublin

23 June 1957
Semi-Final

| Dublin | 3–9 – 0–9 | Wicklow |

St. Conleth's Park, Newbridge

==== Leinster Final ====
7 July 1957

| Louth | 2–9 – 1–7 | Dublin |
|---|---|---|
| Jim McDonnell 2–2, Kevin Beahan 0-4f, Dermot O'Brien, Sean Cunningham, Frank Lynch 0–1 each | | Des Ferguson 1–1, Ollie Freaney 0-4f, Paddy Downey and Cathal O'Leary 0–1 each |

Croke Park, Dublin
Attendance: 30,234
Referee: Eamon Moulds (Wicklow)

| GK | 1 | Seán Óg Flood (Dundalk Young Irelands) |
| RCB | 2 | Ollie Reilly (Hunterstown Rovers) |
| FB | 3 | Tom Conlon (Stabannon Parnells) |
| LCB | 4 | Jim Meehan (Naomh Mhuire) |
| RHB | 5 | Peadar Smith (Oliver Plunketts) |
| CHB | 6 | Jim McArdle (Roche Emmets) |
| LHB | 7 | Stephen White (Dundalk Young Irelands) |
| MF | 8 | Kevin Beahan (Seán McDermotts, Dublin) |
| MF | 9 | Dan O'Neill (St Dominic's) |
| RHF | 10 | Séamus O'Donnell (Cooley Kickhams) |
| CHF | 11 | Dermot O'Brien (St Mary's) |
| LHF | 12 | Alfie Monk (Naomh Mhuire) |
| RCF | 13 | Seán Cunningham (Dundalk Young Irelands) |
| FF | 14 | Jimmy McDonnell (Darver Volunteers) |
| LCF | 15 | Jim Roe (St Mary's) |
Substitutes:
| | 16 | Barney McCoy (St Mary's) for Reilly |
| | 17 | Frank Lynch (Geraldines) for Monk |

| GK | 1 | Paddy O'Flaherty (Beann Éadair) |
| RCB | 2 | Denis Mahony (St Vincents) |
| FB | 3 | Jimmy Lavin (St Vincents) |
| LCB | 4 | Tony Gillen (Clanna Gael) |
| RHB | 5 | Maurice Whelan (St Vincents) |
| CHB | 6 | Marcus Wilson (St Vincents) |
| LHB | 7 | Lar Foley (St Vincents) |
| MF | 8 | Jim Crowley (St Vincents) |
| MF | 9 | Paddy Downey (St Brigid's) |
| RHF | 10 | Des Ferguson (St Vincents) |
| CHF | 11 | Ollie Freaney (St Vincents) |
| LHF | 12 | Cathal O'Leary (St Vincents) |
| RCF | 13 | Roger Conroy (Parnells) |
| FF | 14 | Kevin Heffernan (St Vincents) |
| LCF | 15 | Johnny Boyle (Air Corps) |
Substitutes:
| | 16 | Nicky Maher (St Vincents) for Foley |
| | 17 | Paddy Barrett (Ballyboughal) for Conroy |
| | 18 | Paddy Heron (St Vincents) for Freaney |

=== Munster Senior Football Championship ===
19 May 1957
Quarter-Final

| Tipperary | 2–9 – 4–5 | Clare |

Gaelic Grounds, Limerick
Referee: J. Kerins (K)

2 June 1957
Semi-Final

| Waterford | 2–5 – 0–10 | Kerry |
|---|---|---|
| | | M. O'Connell (0–1), P. Sheehy (0–1), N. Fitzgerald (0–3), T. Lyne (0–2), P. Fitzgerald (0–1), T. Collins (0–1) & D. McAuliffe (0–1). |

Walsh Park, Waterford

9 June 1957
Semi-Final

| Cork | 1–7 – 0–3 | Clare |
|---|---|---|
| J. Creedon (0–1), N. Duggan (0–1), T. Furlong (1–1), T. Ryan (0–1), R. Nutty (1–0) & D. Kelleher (0–3). |

Dr. Mannix Sportsfield, Charleville

==== Munster Final ====
21 July 1957
Final

| Cork | 0–16 – 1–2 | Waterford |
|---|---|---|
| N. Fitzgerald (0–3), T. Furlong (0–2), E. Goulding (0–5), N. Duggan (0–5) & Sub T. Ryan (0–1). |

Semple Stadium, Thurles

=== Ulster Senior Football Championship ===
9 June 1957
Quarter-Final

| Derry | 4–14 – 0–8 | Antrim |

Dean McGlinchey Park, Ballinascreen

16 June 1957
Quarter-Final

| Donegal | 3–2 – 0–6 | Down |

Fr Tierney Park, Ballyshannon

16 June 1957
Quarter-Final

| Cavan | 1–12 – 1–5 | Monaghan |

Breffni Park, Cavan

30 June 1957
Quarter-Final

| Tyrone | 2–9 – 3–5 | Armagh |

The Playing Fields, Lurgan

7 July 1957
Semi-Final

| Derry | 1–10 – 1–9 | Cavan |

O'Neill Park, Dungannon

14 July 1957
Semi-Final

| Tyrone | 3–5 – 2–3 | Donegal |

Breffni Park, Cavan

==== Ulster Final ====
28 July 1957
Final

| Tyrone | 1–9 – 0–10 | Derry |

St. Tiernach's Park, Clones
Attendance: 36,500

=== All-Ireland Senior Football Championship ===
11 August 1957
Semi-Final

| Cork | 2–4 – 0–9 | Galway |
|---|---|---|
| E. Ryan (0–2), N. Fitzgerald (1–0), E. Goulding (0–1), T. Furlong (1–0) & N. Duggan (0–2). |

Croke Park, Dublin
Attendance: 57,066

18 August 1957
Semi-Final

| Louth | 0–13 – 0–7 | Tyrone |

Croke Park, Dublin
Attendance: 30,723

==== All Ireland Final ====
22 September 1957
Final

| Louth | 1–9 – 1–7 | Cork |
|---|---|---|
| Seán Cunningham (1–1), Kevin Beahan (0–3), Jim Roe (0–3), Séamus O'Donnell (0–1), Dan O'Neill (0–1) | | N. Fitzgerald (0–3), T. Furlong (1–1), N. Duggan (0–1) & D. Kelleher (0–3) |

Croke Park, Dublin
Attendance: 72,732
Referee: P Geraghty (Galway)

== Championship statistics ==
=== Miscellaneous ===
- Wicklow record their first ever win over Meath.
- Waterford record their first win over Kerry since 1911.
- The Munster semi-final between Cork vs Clare was the first match to be played at Charleville since 1935.
- The Connacht final between Galway and Leitrim was the first game ever played at the new Pearse Stadium, in Galway, named after both brothers of the 1916 rising Padraic Pearse and William Pearse.
- Louth win the All Ireland title for the first time since 1912.
- There were a number of first-time championship meetings: The All Ireland football semi-final between Louth and Tyrone and the All Ireland final between Louth and Cork.
