= 1956 All-Ireland Senior Football Championship =

Football championship

Championship details
- Dates: May 6 – October 7, 1956
- Teams: 29

All-Ireland Champions
- Winning team: Galway (4th win)
- Captain: Jack Mangan
- Manager: John "Tull" Dunne

All-Ireland Finalists
- Losing team: Cork
- Captain: Donal O'Sullivan
- Manager: Éamonn Young

Provincial Champions
- Munster: Cork
- Leinster: Kildare
- Ulster: Tyrone
- Connacht: Galway

Championship statistics
- No. matches played: 29
- Top Scorer: Frank Stockwell
- Player of the Year: Seán Purcell

The 1956 All-Ireland Senior Football Championship was played from May to October, 1956. Kerry entered the championship as the defending champions, however, they were defeated by Cork in a Munster final replay.

Galway were the winners, defeating Cork in the final on October 7, 1956.

== Results ==
=== Connacht Senior Football Championship ===
17 June 1956
Quarter-Final

Galway	5–13 – 2–5	Mayo
		M Stewart (1–2) & J Curran (1–3, 0–2 frees).

McHale Park, Castlebar
Attendance: 12,000

24 June 1956
Semi-Final

Sligo	3–5 – 0–11	Leitrim

Markievicz Park, Sligo

8 July 1956
Semi-Final

Galway	1–9 – 0–2	Roscommon

Tuam Stadium, Tuam

15 July 1956
Final

Galway	3–12 – 1–5	Sligo

Markievicz Park, Sligo
Attendance: 13,000
Referee: P Carroll (Offaly)

=== Leinster Senior Football Championship ===
6 May 1956
Preliminary Round

Longford	3–7 – 1–6	Laois

O'Connor Park, Tullamore

6 May 1956
Preliminary Round

Wicklow	4–12 – 1–4	Carlow

Geraldine Park, Athy

20 May 1956
Preliminary Round

Kildare	1–9 – 0–9	Louth
E.Treacy 1–3, L.McCormack, R.Swan 0–2, D.Dalton, S.Harrison 0–1.		K. Beahan (0–4, 1f), A. Monk (0–2), S. White (0–1), J. Reynolds (0–1), Jim McArdle (0–1, 1'45)

Páirc Tailteann, Navan

13 May 1956
Quarter-Final

Wexford	2–11 – 1–5	Westmeath

Dr. Cullen Park, Carlow

27 May 1956
Quarter-Final

Dublin	0–11 – 0–5	Wicklow

St. Patrick's Park, Enniscorthy

27 May 1956
Quarter-Final

Offaly	1–14 – 1–5	Meath

St. Conleth's Park, Newbridge
Referee: E Moulds (Wicklow)

10 June 1956
Quarter-Final

Kildare	1–12 – 2–6	Longford
P.Loughlin 1–2, R.Swan, S.Harrison, S.Aldridge 0–3, L.McCormack 0–1.

Cusack Park, Mullingar

24 June 1956
Semi-Final

Wexford	2–7 – 0–7	Dublin

Dr. Cullen Park, Carlow

1 July 1956
Semi-Final

Kildare	1–8 – 0–7	Offaly
S.Harison 0–3, D.Dalton 1–0, P.Mooney 0–2, P.Loughlin, R. Swann, E.Treacy 0–1

O'Moore Park, Portlaoise
Attendance: 22700
Referee: W Goodison (Wexford)

22 July 1956
Final

Kildare	2–11 – 1–8	Wexford
Seamus Harrison 0-7f, Paddy Loughlin 1–2, Ned Treacy 1–1, Ned Loughlin 0–1		Mick Byrne 1–1, Paddy Kehoe (0-2f) and Frank Morris 0–2 each, Padge Kehoe, Pako Sheehan, Jack Goff 0–1 each

Croke Park, Dublin
Attendance: 47,856
Referee: Mick McArdle (Louth)

=== Munster Senior Football Championship ===
3 June 1956
Quarter-Final

Tipperary	2–4 – 0–7	Clare

Gaelic Grounds, Limerick
Referee: G. Cremins (K)

24 June 1956
Semi-Final

Cork	0–12 – 0–1	Waterford
S. Moore (0–1), E. Goulding (0–1), N. Collins (0–4), J. Creedon (0–3) & P. Murphy-sub (0–1).

Castle Grounds, Lismore

24 June 1956
Semi-Final

Kerry	3–7 – 3–2	Tipperary
J. Dowling (0–1), M. O'Connell (0–1), P. Sheehy (0–1), T. Long (0–1), J. Brosnan (0–1), J. Cronin (2–1) & T. Lyne (1–1)

Austin Stack Park, Tralee
Referee: P. O'Grady ( C )

15 July 1956
Final

Cork	2–2 – 2–2	Kerry
N. Fitzgerald (0–2), T. Furlong (0–4) & N. Duggan (0–2).		J. Dowling (0–1), T. Lyne (0–1), J. Brosnan (1–0) & D. O'Shea (1–0).

Cork Athletic Grounds, Cork

29 July 1956
Final Replay

Cork	1–8 – 1–7	Kerry
D. Kelleher (0–1), N. Fitzgerald (0–5), T. Furlong (1–0) & N. Duggan (0–2).		J. Dowling (0–1), T. Lyne (0–2), J. Brosnan (0–1), J. Cronin (1–0) & P.Sheehy (0–3)

Fitzgerald Stadium, Killarney

=== Ulster Senior Football Championship ===
3 June 1956
Quarter-Final

Tyrone	3–7 – 2–4	Derry

O'Neill Park, Dungannon

10 June 1956
Quarter-Final

Donegal	1–8 – 2–8	Monaghan

Bundoran
Attendance: 4,500

17 June 1956
Quarter-Final

Cavan	3–15 – 2–4	Antrim

Casement Park, Belfast

24 June 1956
Quarter-Final

Armagh	2–5 – 0–6	Down

Páirc Esler, Newry

8 July 1956
Semi-Final

Tyrone	2–9 – 0–7	Monaghan

The Playing Fields, Lurgan
Attendance: 9,000

15 July 1956
Semi-Final

Cavan	1–9 – 1–5	Armagh

St. Mary's Park, Castleblayney

29 July 1956
Final

Tyrone	3–5 – 0–4	Cavan

St. Tiernach's Park, Clones

=== All-Ireland Senior Football Championship ===
August 5, 1956
Semi-Final

Cork	0–9 – 0–5	Kildare
D. Kellaher (0–1), N. Fitzgerald (0–3), P. Murphy (0–1), T. Furlong (1–0) & N. Duggan (0–2).		S.Harrison (4f) 0–4, E.Treacy 0–1

Croke Park, Dublin

August 12, 1956
Semi-Final

Galway	0–8 – 0–6	Tyrone

Croke Park, Dublin

October 7, 1956
Final

Galway	2–13 – 3–7	Cork
F. Stockwell (2–5), S. Purcell (0–3), G. Kirwan & J. Coyle (0–2) & F. Evers (0–1).		D. Gallagher (0–1), N. Fitzgerald (0–5), T. Furlong (1–0) & N. Duggan (0–2).

Croke Park, Dublin
Attendance: 70,772
Referee: Peter McDermott (Meath)

== Championship statistics ==
=== Miscellaneous ===
- Munster final ends in a draw and goes to a replay for the first time since 1909 when Cork took Kerry's All Ireland title.
- Kildare win their first Leinster title since 1935 and was their last until 1998.
- Tyrone win their first Ulster title.
- The All Ireland semi-final between Galway and Tyrone was their first meeting between the two teams.
- The All Ireland final between Galway and Cork gave Galway won their 4th All Ireland title on the day after three successive defeats between 1940 and 1942.
- An outbreak of polio in Cork and the fear of a spread of the disease to Dublin due to an influx of Cork supporters lead to the postponement of the All-Ireland final until 7 October 1956.
