= 2007 Waterford Senior Hurling Championship =

Annual hurling competition season

- Sponsor: Top Oil
- Champions: Ballyduff Upper (3rd title); Stephen Molumphy (captain); Maurice Geary (manager)
- Runners-up: Ballygunner; Fergal Hartley (captain); Peter Queally (manager)

The 2007 Waterford Senior Hurling Championship was the 107th staging of the Waterford Senior Hurling Championship since its establishment by the Waterford County Board in 1897.

Mount Sion were the defending champions.

On 4 November 2007, Ballyduff Upper won the championship after a 1–18 to 1–14 defeat of Ballygunner in the final. This was their third championship title overall and their first title since 1987.

== Results ==
=== Final ===
4 November 2007 Final	Ballyduff Upper	1–18 – 1–14	Ballygunner	Walsh Park, Waterford
	B Hannon 0–9 (7f, 1pen), J Kearney 0–6, P Kearney 1–0, A Power 0–2 (2f), M Molumphy 0–1.	Report	S Power 1–6 (6f), A Moloney 0–3, G O'Connor 0–2, S O'Sullivan, S Walsh, JJ Hutchinson 0–1 each.	Referee: M Wadding (Roanmore)
