= Jake Dillon =

Irish hurler

Personal information
- Native name: Jake Ó Diolúin (Irish)
- Born: 13 January 1993 (age 33) Waterford, Ireland
- Height: 1.78 m (5 ft 10 in)

Sport
- Sport: Hurling
- Position: Left wing-forward
Club
- Years: Club
- 2010-: De La Salle
Club titles
- Waterford titles: 2
- Munster titles: 1
College
- Years: College
- Waterford Institute of Technology
College titles
- Fitzgibbon titles: 1
Inter-county*
Years	County	Apps (scores)
2013-2018	Waterford	31 (4-29)
Inter-county titles
- Munster titles: 0
- All-Irelands: 0
- NHL: 1
- All Stars: 0
- *Inter County team apps and scores correct as of 16:29, 29 November 2020.

Jake Dillon (born 13 January 1993) is an Irish hurler who plays as a right wing-forward for the Waterford senior team.

Born in Waterford, Dillon first played competitive hurling whilst at school in De La Salle College. He arrived on the inter-county scene at the age of seventeen when he first linked up with the Waterford minor team, before later lining out with the under-21 side. He made his senior debut in the 2013 National Hurling League. Dillon has since gone on to play a key role in the forwards for Waterford, however, he has yet to claim any silverware.

At club level Dillon is a one-time Munster medallist with De La Salle. He has also won two championship medals.

== Career statistics ==
As of match played 28 November 2020.

Team	Year	National League			Munster		All-Ireland		Total	
Team	Year	Division	Apps	Score	Apps	Score	Apps	Score	Apps	Score
Waterford	2013	Division 1A	5	1-11	1	1-02	3	1-06	9	3-19
Waterford	2014	Division 1A	3	0-02	2	0-01	2	0-05	7	0-08
Waterford	2015	Division 1B	8	0-10	2	1-00	2	0-01	12	1-11
Waterford	2016	Division 1A	9	1-04	2	0-01	3	1-03	14	2-08
Waterford	2017	Division 1A	3	0-00	1	0-00	5	0-03	9	0-03
Waterford	2018	Division 1A	4	0-02	4	0-05	—		8	0-07
Waterford	2019	Division 1B	—		—		—		—	
Waterford	2020	Division 1A	2	0-01	2	0-02	2	0-00	6	0-03
Career total			34	2-30	14	2-11	17	2-18	65	6-59

== Honours ==
De La Salle College

- All-Ireland Colleges' Senior Hurling Championship (1): 2008
- Munster Colleges' Senior Hurling Championship (1): 2008

Waterford Institute of Technology

- Fitzgibbon Cup (1): 2014

De La Salle

- Munster Senior Club Hurling Championship (1): 2010
- Waterford Senior Hurling Championship (2): 2010, 2012

Waterford

- National Hurling League (1): 2015
- Munster Minor Hurling Championship (1): 2009

Sporting positions
Preceded by Noel Connors	Waterford Senior Hurling Vice-Captain; 2014	Succeeded by Pauric Mahony; Darragh Fives
