= 2004 Waterford Senior Hurling Championship =

Annual hurling competition season

- Dates: 2 May 2004 – 4 December 2004
- Teams: 14
- Champions: Mount Sion (34th title); Anthony Kirwan (captain); Jim Greene (manager)
- Runners-up: Ballygunner; Niall O'Donnell (captain); Mick Mahony (manager)
- Relegated: Ballyduff Upper

Tournament statistics
- Matches played: 27
- Top scorer(s): Dave Bennett (4–52)

The 2004 Waterford Senior Hurling Championship was the 104th staging of the Waterford Senior Hurling Championship since its establishment by the Waterford County Board in 1897. The draw for the opening round fixtures took place on 26 January 2004. The championship began on 2 May 2004 and ended on 4 December 2004.

Mount Sion were the defending champions.

On 10 October 2004, Mount Sion won the championship after a 4–14 to 4–07 defeat of Ballygunner in the final at Walsh Park. It was their 34th championship title overall and their third title in succession.

Lismore's Dave Bennett was the championship's top scorer with 4–52.

== Team changes ==
=== To Championship ===
Promoted from the Waterford Intermediate Hurling Championship

- Abbeyside

=== From Championship ===
Relegated to the Waterford Intermediate Hurling Championship

- Portlaw

== Results ==
=== First round ===
2 May 2004 First round	Fourmilewater	1–11 – 2–09	Roanmore	Fraher Field, Dungarvan
	S Walsh 0–5, S Lawlor 1–0, D Spellman 0–3, B Wall 0–2, A Lawlor 0–1.		D Byrne 1–4, L O'Neill 1–0, D Murphy 0–2, P Murphy 0–1, C Fanning 0–1.

23 May 2004 First round	Waterford Institute of Technology	0–08 – 3–07	Ballyduff Lower
	B Dowling 0–6, R Wall 0–1, A Owens 0–1.		J Kennedy 2–1, R Barron 1–1, C Kenny 0–2, P Fitzgerald 0–1, G Harris 0–1, A Dunne 0–1.	Referee: T O'Byrne (Erin's Own)

23 May 2004 First round	De La Salle	2–12 – 2–11	Abbeyside	Walsh Park, Waterford
	J Quirke 0–6, L Hayes 1–1, A Ryan 1–0, B Phelan 0–2, J Mullane 0–2, D McGrath 0–1.		M Gorman 1–5, J Foley 1–0, L Hurney 0–3, D Fives 0–2, J Hurney 0–1.	Referee: B Power (Mount Sion)

23 May 2004 First round	Tallow	1–12 – 2–13	Ballygunner	Fraher Field, Dungarvan
	P Kearney 0–8, S Slattery 1–0, W Murphy 0–2, J Murray 0–1, B Henley 0–1.		P Flynn 1–6, B Mullane 1–1, G O'Connor 0–3, T Power 0–1, C Kehoe 0–1, S O'Sullivan 0–1.	Referee: T O'Sullivan (Cappoquin)

23 May 2004 First round	Stradbally	3–11 – 5–12	Lismore	Fraher Field, Dungarvan
	M Walsh 0–5, S Lawlor 1–1, S Cunningham 1–1, G Walsh 1–1, J Herane 0–2, G Power 0–1.		D Bennett 2–6, M O'Sullivan 1–1, M Prendergast 1–0, P Prendergast 1–0, D Shanahan 0–3, D O'Gorman 0–1, D Howard 0–1.	Referee: D O'Leary (Erin's Own)

23 May 2004 First round	Ballyduff Upper	3–09 – 4–11	Ardmore	Cappoquin
	B Hannon 1–4, T Molumphy 2–0, J Twomey 0–3, S Molumphy 0–1, L McNamara 0–1.		S Prendergast 1–7, N O'Brien 2–0, J Hennessy 1–0, D Prendergast 0–1, J Conway 0–1, W Hennessy 0–1, P Beausang 0–1.	Referee: T O'Sullivan (Cappoquin)

23 May 2004 First round	Mount Sion	2–15 – 0–15	Comeragh Gaels	Fraher Field, Dungarvan
	E Kelly 1–9, B Greene 1–1, A Kirwan 0–2, M White 0–1, K Stafford 0–1, K McGrath 0–1.		J Wall 0–7, JP Fitzpatrick 0–3, D Coffey 0–2, J Morrissey 0–1, S Dempsey 0–1, P Radley 0–1.

=== Second round ===
==== Preliminary round ====
9 July 2004 Preliminary round	Ardmore	0–19 – 1–14	Lismore	Fraher Field, Dungarvan
	S Prendergast 0–12, M O'Connor 0–3, J O'Donovan 0–3, J Hennessy 0–1.		D Shanahan 0–6, B Bennett 1–1, D Bennett 0–4, J Shanahan 0–1, J Heneghan 0–1, P Prendergast 0–1.	Referee: T O'Byrne (Erin's Own)

==== Winners' group ====
10 July 2004 Winners' group	Ballyduff Lower	1–14 – 1–13	De La Salle	Walsh Park, Waterford
	B Power 0–5, J Kennedy 0–4, P Matthews 1–0, C Kenny 0–2, P Fitzgerald 0–1, N Power 0–1, S Larkin 0–1.		J Mullane 1–4, J Quirke 0–4, D McGrath 0–2, P Nevin 0–2, L Hayes 0–1.	Referee: T O'Sullivan (Cappoquin)

10 July 2004 Winners' group	Mount Sion	2–14 – 0–07	Roanmore	Walsh Park, Waterford
	E McGrath 1–3, M White 0–6, S Ryan 1–1, E Kelly 0–3, D Kelly 0–1.		D Byrne 0–5, D Murphy 0–1, S Flynn 0–1.	Referee: P Moore (Abbeyside)

14 August 2004 Winners' group	Ballygunner	2–10 – 1–10	Ardmore	Fraher Field, Dungarvan
	P Flynn 2–5, P Foley 0–2, G O'Connor 0–1, A Moloney 0–1, W Hutchinson 0–1.		S Prendergast 0–7, B Harty 1–0, R Hennessy 0–1, W Hennessy 0–1, A O'Donnell 0–1.	Referee: T O'Sullivan (Cappoquin)

==== Losers' group ====
10 July 2004 Losers' group	Tallow	3–09 – 1–09	Fourmilewater	Fraher Field, Dungarvan
	P Keraney 1–4, A Kearney 1–1, B Henley 1–1, S Slattery 0–1, J Murray 0–1, P O'Brien 0–1.		S Walsh 1–6, D Spellman 0–1, L Lawlor 0–1, B Wall 0–1.	Referee: D O'Leary (Erin's Own)

10 July 2004 Losers' group	Stradbally	2–13 – 1–10	Abbeyside	Fraher Field, Dungarvan
	M Walsh 0–8, D Doyle 1–1, P Doyle 1–0, P Kiely 0–2, J Coffey 0–1, S Cunningham 0–1.		M Enright 1–2, M Gorman 0–5, S Briggs 0–2, M Fives 0–1.	Referee: P Walsh (Fourmilewater)

11 July 2004 Losers' group	Waterford Institute of Technology	1–15 – 1–07	Comeragh Gaels	Fraher Field, Dungarvan
	W Ryan 0–8, A Owens 1–2, MJ Furlong 0–3, B Smiddy 0–1, M Jacob 0–1.		J Wall 0–6, M Flynn 1–0, JP Fitzpatrick 0–1.	Referee: T O'Sullivan (Cappoquin)

14 August 2004 Losers' group	Ballyduff Upper	1–11 – 3–17	Lismore	Cappoquin
	B Hannon 1–5, J Kearney 0–3, J Twomey 0–2, S Molumphy 0–1.		J Heneghan 2–4, D Bennett 1–7, J Shanahan 0–2, P Prendergast 0–1, D Shanahan 0–1, D Howard 0–1, D O'Gorman 0–1.	Referee: P Moore (Abbeyside)

=== Relegation play-offs ===
20 November 2004 Round 1	Abbeyside	1–11 – 1–08	Ballyduff Upper	Fraher Field, Dungarvan
	M Gorman 0–5, P Hurney 1–1, M Enright 0–2, M Fives 0–2, J Hurney 0–1.		B Hannon 1–4, J Kearney 0–2, S Cunningham 0–1, P Kearney 0–1.	Referee: M Wadding (Roanmore)

28 November 2004 Round 2	Fourmilewater	2–14 – 1–17	Ballyduff Upper	Fraher Field, Dungarvan
	P Walsh 1–8, D Spellman 1–0, S Walsh 0–2, G Walsh 0–1, B Wall 0–1, L Lawlor 0–1, S Lawlor 0–1.		B Hannon 0–11, J Twomey 1–1, S Molumphy 0–2, P Kearney 0–2, S Cunningham 0–1.	Referee: J Hunt (Clonea)

4 December 2004 Round 2 replay	Fourmilewater	0–12 – 1–08	Ballyduff Upper	Fraher Field, Dungarvan
	P Walsh 0–6, D Spellman 0–2, S Lawlor 0–2, S Walsh 0–1, B Wall 0–1.		J Twomey 1–1, B Hannon 0–3, S Hannon 0–2, J Kearney 0–1, P Kearney 0–1.	Referee: T O'Sullivan (Cappoquin)

=== Losers' group ===
13 August 2004 Round 1	Tallow	3–14 – 1–13	Waterford Institute of Technology	Fraher Field, Dungarvan
	C Geary 2–3, P O'Brien 0–5, S McCarthy 1–1, B Henley 0–2, W Henley 0–1, J Murray 0–1, A Kearney 0–1.		W Ryan 1–9, D Hayes 0–2, B Smiddy 0–1, C Burns 0–1.	Referee: M Wadding (Roanmore)

14 August 2004 Round 1	Roanmore	1–10 – 0–09	Stradbally	Walsh Park, Waterford
	L O'Neill 1–4, S Flynn 0–3, D Burns 0–1, C Burke 0–1, M Creed 0–1.		M Walsh 0–6, N Curran 0–2, J Hearne 0–1.

22 August 2004 Round 1	Lismore	1–08 – 0–10	De La Salle	Fraher Field, Dungarvan
	D Bennett 0–5, D Shanahan 1–0, D Howard 0–2, J Heneghan 0–1.		J Quirke 0–7, J Mullane 0–2, B Power 0–1.

22 August 2004 Round 2	Tallow	0–12 – 0–09	Ardmore	Fraher Field, Dungarvan
	Paul Kearney 0–9, C Geary 0–2, J Murray 0–1.		S Prendergast 0–5, W Hennessy 0–2, N Hennessy 0–1, N O'Brien 0–1.	Referee: M Wadding (Roanmore)

5 September 2004 Round 2	Lismore	0–16 – 0–11	Roanmore	Fraher Field, Dungarvan
	D Bennett 0–12, J Heneghan 0–1, D Howard 0–1, B Bennett 0–1, J Shanahan 0–1.		D Byrne 0–9, C O'Neill 0–1, C Fanning 0–1.	Referee: S Flynn (Fenor)

=== Quarter-final ===
11 September 2004 Quarter-final	Lismore	2–12 – 1–08	Tallow	Fraher Field, Dungarvan
	D Shanahan 2–2, D Bennett 0–8, P Prendergast 0–1, A Ormonde 0–1.		P Kearney 0–5, B Henley 1–0, J Murray 0–2, F McCarthy 0–1.	Referee: P Moore (Abbeyside)

=== Semi-finals ===
25 September 2004 Semi-final	Ballygunner	2–15 – 2–13	Lismore	Fraher Field, Dungarvan
	P Flynn 1–8, G O'Connor 1–1, T Power 0–2, A Moloney 0–2, S O'Sullivan 0–1, P Foley 0–1.		D Bennett 1–10, J Heneghan 1–1, D Shanahan 0–2.	Referee: M Wadding (Roanmore)

25 September 2004 Semi-final	Mount Sion	2–16 – 1–08	Ballyduff Lower	Fraher Field, Dungarvan
	M White 0–8, K McGrath 1–1, B Browne 1–0, E Kelly 0–3, B Greene 0–2, S Ryan 0–1, R McGrath 0–1.		P Fitzgerald 0–4, R Barron 1–0, J Kennedy 0–2, G Harris 0–1, S Larkin 0–1.	Referee: P Moore (Abbeyside)

=== Final ===
10 October 2004 Final	Mount Sion	4–14 – 4–07	Ballygunner	Walsh Park, Waterford
	K McGrath 1–3 (1-0f); E Kelly 1–2; S Ryan 1–1; T Browne 1–0; B Greene, M White (1f), F O'Shea 0–2 each; E McGrath, M Frisby 0–1 each.		P Foley 1–2; A Moloney, C Kehoe 1–1 each; T Power 1–0 (f); S O'Sullivan 0–2; G O'Connor 0–1.	Referee: T O'Sullivan (Cappoquin/Afane)

== Championship statistics ==
=== Top scorers ===
Top scorers overall

Rank	Player	Club	Tally	Total	Matches	Average
1	Dave Bennett	Lismore	4–52	64	7	9.14
2	Brendan Hannon	Ballyduff Upper	3–27	36	5	7.20
3	Séamus Prendergast	Ardmore	1–31	34	5	6.80
4	Paul Flynn	Ballygunner	4–19	31	3	10.33
5	Paul Kearney	Tallow	1–26	29	4	7.25
6	Dan Shanahan	Lismore	3–14	23	7	3.28
6	Eoin Kelly	Mount Sion	2–17	23	4	5.75

Top scorers in a single game

Rank	Player	Club	Tally	Total	Opposition
1	Dave Bennett	Lismore	1–10	13	Ballygunner
2	Dave Bennett	Lismore	2–06	12	Stradbally
2	Eoin Kelly	Mount Sion	1–09	12	Comeragh Gaels
2	Willie Ryan	Waterford IT	1–09	12	Tallow
2	Séamus Prendergast	Ardmore	0–12	12	Lismore
2	Dave Bennett	Lismore	0–12	12	Roanmore
3	Paul Flynn	Ballygunner	2–05	11	Ardmore
3	Pat Walsh	Fourmilewater	1–08	11	BAllyduff Upper
3	Paul Flynn	Ballygunner	1–08	11	Lismore
3	Brendan Hannon	BAllyduff Upper	0–11	11	Fourmilewater
