= 1988 Waterford Senior Hurling Championship =

Annual hurling competition season

- Champions: Mount Sion (28th title)
- Runners-up: Ballygunner

The 1988 Waterford Senior Hurling Championship was the 88th staging of the Waterford Senior Hurling Championship since its establishment by the Waterford County Board in 1897.

Ballyduff Upper were the defending champions.

On 25 September 1988, Mount Sion won the championship after a 2–15 to 3–08 defeat of Ballygunner in the final. This was their 28th championship title overall and their first title since 1986.
