= 1917 Waterford Senior Hurling Championship =

Annual hurling competition season

- Champions: Dungarvan (2nd title)

The 1917 Waterford Senior Hurling Championship was the 18th staging of the Waterford Senior Hurling Championship since its establishment by the Waterford County Board in 1897.

Young Irelands were the defending champions.

Dungarvan won the championship. This was their second championship title overall and their first title since 1908.
