= 2017–18 All-Ireland Junior Club Hurling Championship =

Championship Details
- Dates: 1 October 2017 – 4 February 2018
- Teams: 30

All Ireland Champions
- Winners: Ardmore (1st win)
- Captain: Declan Prendergast
- Manager: Thomas Cronin

All Ireland Runners-up
- Runners-up: Fethard St. Mogue's
- Captain: Garrett Foley
- Manager: Lorcan Barden

Provincial Champions
- Munster: Ardmore
- Leinster: Fethard St. Mogue's
- Ulster: Setanta Hurling Club (Donegal)
- Connacht: Sylane

Championship Statistics
- Matches Played: 29
- Total Goals: 92 (3.17 per game)
- Total Points: 756 (26.06 per game)
- Top Scorer: Mark Wallace (0-59)

The 2017–18 All-Ireland Junior Club Hurling Championship is the 15th staging of the All-Ireland Junior Club Hurling Championship, the Gaelic Athletic Association's junior inter-county club hurling tournament. The championship began on 1 October 2017 and ended on 4 February 2018.

The All-Ireland final was played on 4 February 2018 at Croke Park in Dublin, between Ardmore from Waterford and Fethard St. Mogue's from Wexford, in what was their first ever meeting in the final. Ardmore won the match by 3-11 to 0-18 to claim their first ever championship title. This was their first All-Ireland title in the grade.

Fethard's Mark Wallace was the championship's top scorer with 0-59.

== Connacht Junior Club Hurling Championship ==
=== Connacht semi-final ===
30 October 2017 Semi-final	Calry/St. Joseph's	4–13 – 0–06	Carrick Hurling Club	Markievicz Park
	K Raymond 0-6, E Doherty 1-1, K Gilmartin 1-1, R Cox 1-0, D Cox 1-0, C Griffin 0-3, D Collery 0-2.		C Cunniffe 0-5, J Glancy 0-1.

=== Connacht final ===
4 November 2017 Final	Sylane	0–21 – 0–05	Calry/St. Joseph's	Connacht Centre of Excellence
	A Cullinane (0-4, 2f), R Keane (0-3), K Brady (0-3); S Reilly (0-2); S Glynn (0-2), O Martin (0-2), S Martin (0-1), C Burke (0-1), A Cosgrove (0-1); G O'Neill (0-1), P Burke (0-1).	Report	K Raymond (0-4, 3f), K Gilmartin (0-1f).

== Leinster Junior Club Hurling Championship ==
=== Leinster first round ===
14 October 2017 First round	Erin's Isle	1–20 – 0–09	Maynooth	O'Toole Park
	C Kearney 0-9.	Report

14 October 2017 First round	Naomh Bríd	w/o – scr.	Arklow Rock Parnells	Netwatch Cullen Park

14 October 2017 First round	Fr. Dalton's	2–11 – 0–09	Naomh Moninne	Ballymore
	C Mackey 1-7, K Marti 1-0, B McKnight 0-1, B Finerty 0-1, P Nestor 0-1, R McLoughlin 0-1.		R Geoghegan 0-6, D O'Hanrahan 0-1, J Martin 0-1, D Flanagan 0-1.

14 October 2017 First round	Wolfe Tones	3–06 – 7–18	Navan O'Mahonys	Edgeworthstown
	J Newman 1-4, L Kelly 1-0, S Browne 1-0, J Mulhern 0-1, M Coyle 0-1.		C Fitzpatrick 2-2, M Kelly 2-2, J Walsh 1-5, P Skehan 1-4, D Quirke 1-0, D Regan 0-3, S Crosby 0-1, J Foley 0-1.

=== Leinster quarter-finals ===
21 October 2017 Quarter-final	Naomh Bríd	0–09 – 2–11	Fethard St. Mogue's	Netwatch Training Centre
	M Brennan (0-3), A Amond (0-3 frees), G Dunne (0-1 free), A Brennan (0-1), E Holland (0-1 free).	Report	M Wallace (0-9, 8 frees, 1 '65), J Tubritt (1-0); E Power (1-0), G Foley (0-1), D Barden (0-1).

25 October 2017 Quarter-final	Fr. Dalton's	1–15 – 0–14	Ballinamere	St. Loman's Park
	C Mackey 1-9, R McLoughlin 0-3, B Finerty 0-1, P Nestor 0-1, S Egan 0-1.		P Murphy 0-9, M O'Brien 0-2, C Spollen 0-1, D Wyer 0-1, S Duignan 0-1.

28 October 2017 Quarter-final	Erin's Isle	2–11 – 2–07	Trumera	O'Toole Park
	F Carroll 1-2, C Kearney 0-4, D Hanlo 1-0, M O'Donovan 0-2, K Dunne 0-1, D Kelly 0-1, D Farrell 0-1.	Report	D Lalor 2-3, J Coogan 0-2, N Sinnott 0-1, D Lalor 0-1.

28 October 2017 Quarter-final	Navan O'Mahonys	2–12 – 4–20	John Locke's	Paddy O'Brien Park
	P Skehan 0-6, J Walsh 0-4, M Kelly 1-0, J Foley 1-0, D Quirke 0-1, C O'Rourke 0-1.		D McCormack 3-3, J Power 0-11, P Kennedy 1-0, R Kerwick 0-2, R Bergin 0-2, S Power 0-1, E Scriven 0-1.

=== Leinster semi-finals ===
4 November 2017 Semi-final	Erin's Isle	3–07 – 1–19	Fethard St. Mogue's	O'Toole Park
	C Kearney 0-5, K Stone 1-1, F Carroll 1-0, M Donovan 1-0, G Whelan 0-1.		M Wallace 0-9, M Dwyer 1-3, C Dwyer 0-5, J Tubritt 0-1, E Power 0-1.

4 November 2017 Semi-final	Fr. Dalton's	0–07 – 2–17	John Locke's	St. Loman's Park
	R McLoughlin 0-2, P Nestor 0-1, B Finnerty 0-1, K Martin 0-1, J Gilligan 0-1, C Mackey 0-1.		J Power 0-9, S Bergin 1-1, D McCormack 1-0, P Kennedy 0-3, S Power 0-1, O McGrath 0-1, T Delaney 0-1, R Kerwick 0-1.

=== Leinster final ===
11 November 2017 Final	Fethard St. Mogue's	1–17 – 2–11	John Locke's	Innovate Wexford Park
	M Wallace (0-9, 8 frees), G O'Grady (1-1), M Dwyer (0-3), G Foley (0-2), E Power (0-1), D Barden (0-1).	Report	J Power (0-6 frees), R Bergin (1-1, 1-0 free); S Bergin (1-0), D McCormack (0-2), O McGrath (0-1), R Kerwick (0-1).	Referee: T Gleeson (Dublin)

== Munster Junior Club Hurling Championship ==
=== Munster quarter-finals ===
28 October 2017 Quarter-final	Ballybacon-Grange	5–24 – 1–04	Kenmare Shamrocks	Ardfinnan GAA Ground
	A Lonergan (1-6, 0-2F), G Whelan (2-0), D O’Regan (1-3), D Walsh (1-2), B Hewitt (0-4), M Barlow (0-2), G Cronin (0-1), B Cummins (0-1f), M O’Sullivan (0-1), B Dillon (0-1), J English (0-1), O Ryan (0-1), A Savage (0-1).	Report	J Duncan (1–3, 0-3f), K O’Sullivan (0–1).	Referee: J Larkin (Cork)

5 November 2017 Quarter-final	St. Patrick's	0–11 – 4–20	Ardmore	Gaelic Grounds
	C Moran 0-7, B Mullins 0-1, G Hegarty 0-1, J Doyle 0-1, M Geary 0-1.	Report	S Prendergast 1-9, D Gartland 1-4, S Keating 0-4, J Flavin 1-0, K Conway 1-0, W Hennessey 0-2, J Gartland 0-1.	Referee: P Kelly (Tipperary)

=== Munster semi-finals ===
12 November 2017 Semi-final	Ballybacon-Grange	1–11 – 0–09	St. Catherine's	Ardfinnan GAA Ground
	B Cummins (0–6 frees), G Cronin (1–1), A Lonergan (0–3, 2 frees), A Savage (0–1).	Report	D Mangan (0–3), B Mulcahy (0–3), R Clancy (0–2, 1 free and 1 ’65), R Galvin (0–1).	Referee: J Mullins (Limerick)

12 November 2017 Semi-final	Ardmore	5–22 – 1–08	Bodyke	Carriganore
	S Prendergast 2-6, J Flavin 2-0, J Gartland 1-3, D Gartland 0-6, J Kennedy 0-2, K Conway 0-1, Seamus Keating 0-1, R Hennessy 0-1, K Murphy 0-1, W Hennessy 0-1.	Report	I Murray 1-5, L O'Donnell 0-2, P McNamara 0-1.	Referee: K Jordan (Tipperary)

=== Munster final ===
3 December 2017 Final	Ardmore	3–11 – 2–08	Ballybacon-Grange	Mallow GAA Complex
	S Prendergast (2–5, 0–2 frees); D Gartland (1–1); J Kennedy, J Flavin (0–2 each); E O’Shea (0–1).	Report	B Cummins (1–2) (1–1 frees, 0–1 65); D Walsh (1–0), A Lonergan (0–3, frees); D O’Regan (0–2); A Savage (0–1).	Referee: N Wall (Cork)

== Ulster Junior Club Hurling Championship ==
=== Ulster quarter-finals ===
1 October 2017 Quarter-final	Mullahoran St. Joseph's	3–08 – 0–14	Naomh Colum Cille	Ballyconnell

1 October 2017 Quarter-final	Setanta	1–18 – 2–09	Ballela	O'Donnell Park
	K Campbell (0-7, 6f), D Coulter (0-6, 2f), B Lafferty (1-0), R Kee (0-1), D Cullen (0-1); B Tourish (0-1), C Melaugh (0-1), M Kane (0-1);	Report	M Magee (2-4, 2f), J McCusker (0-4, 3f), N Savage (0-1).

1 October 2017 Quarter-final	Gort na Móna	0–25 – 2–19	Derrynoose	Corrigan Park
	D McClean (0-7f), T McCafferty (0-6), P McCafferty (0-3), M Ward (0-2), D Boyd (0-2), D McVeigh (0-2), D Hughes (0-1), S Doyle (0-1), P Fryers (0-1).	Report	P McKearney (0-12, 0-11f), D McCreash (2-1), J Brennan (0-1), S Kennan (0-1), P Kelly (0-1), P Lennon (0-1), P McNaughton (0-1), C McGrory (0-1).

1 October 2017 Quarter-final	Carrickmacross	1–05 – 3–15	Na Magha	St. Mary's Park
	L McKenna 1-1, E Collins 0-2, O Kiernan 0-1, C Guinan 0-1.	Report	D Foley 1-6 (0-4f), T Rankin 1-1, B Quigley 0-4, A O’Donnell 1-0, F McEnaney 0-2, M McShane 0-1, C McCarron 0-1.

8 October 2017 Quarter-final replay	Derrynoose	0–13 – 1–12	Gort na Móna	Davitt Park
	P McKearney (0-6f), S Keenan (0-2), D McCreash (0-2), F Corvan (0-1), P McGrane (0-1), K McKenna (0-1).	Report	P Fryers (1-1), P McCafferty (0-3, 0-2f), C McCann (0-3f), D Boyd (0-2), P McHugh (0-1), D McVeigh (0-1), T McCafferty (0-1).

=== Ulster semi-finals ===
8 October 2017 Semi-final	Mullahoran St. Joseph's	0–08 – 2–25	Na Magha	Gavan Duffy Park

22 October 2017 Semi-final	Setanta	1–20 – 1–06	Gort na Móna	Celtic Park
	D Coulter 1-7 (5f), K Campbell 0-5 (2f, 1 ‘65’), C Melaugh 0-4, D Cullen 0-2; B Lafferty 0-2.	Report	P McCaffrey 1-3 (1f), S Doyle 0-1, M Ward 0-1, T McGoran 0-1.

=== Ulster final ===
5 November 2017 Final	Setanta	2–17 – 3–11	Na Magha	MacCumhaill Park
	K Campbell (0-11f), D Coulter (1-6), B Lafferty (1-0).	Report	D Foley (1-7f), D Shiels (1-2), A Grant (1-0), B Douban (0-1), C McGoran (0-1).

== All-Ireland Junior Club Hurling Championship ==
=== All-Ireland quarter-final ===
25 November 2017 Quarter-final	Brothers Pearse	2–09 – 0–18	Fethard St. Mogue's	McGovern Park, Ruislip
	K Reid 1-2 (1-1f, 1 '65), P Hogan 1-1, T Clarke 0-4 (1f), E Sheils, C Kennedy 0-1 each.	Report	M Wallace 0-7 (7f), M Dwyer 0-6, G Foley 0-3, G O'Grady 0-2.	Referee: S Hynes (Galway)

=== All-Ireland semi-finals ===
20 January 2018 Semi-final	Sylane	0–09 – 0–18	Fethard St. Mogue's	Nowlan Park, Kilkenny
	A Cullinane (0-5 frees), O Martin (0-3), K Brady (0-1 free).	Report	M Wallace (0-11, 9 frees, 1 '65), C Dwyer (0-2), M Dwyer (0-2), E Power (0-2), J Sutton (0-1).

27 January 2018 Semi-final	Ardmore	4–12 – 0–13	Setanta	Páirc Tailteann, Navan
	S Prendergast 1-6 (0-5fs); J Flavin 2-0; D Gartland 1-2, J Kennedy, S Keating, N Hennessy, J Gartland 0-1 each.	Report	D Coulter (1f), K Campbell (3fs), D Cullen (1'65) 0-3 each, B Lafferty 0-2, C Melaugh, N Cleary 0-1 each.

=== All-Ireland final ===
4 February 2018 Final	Fethard St. Mogue's	0–18 – 3–11 (aet)	Ardmore	Croke Park, Dublin
	M Wallace 0–14 (12f, 1 '65), M Dwyer 0–2, G Foley 0–1, E Power 0–1	Report	S Prendergast 1–8 (7f), J Gartland 2–0, D Gartland 0–2, S Keating 0–1	Referee: S Hynes (Galway)

== Championship statistics ==
=== Top scorers ===
Overall

Rank	Player	Club	Tally	Total	Matches	Average
1	Mark Wallace	Fethard St. Mogue's	0-59	59	5	9.83
2	Séamus Prendergast	Ardmore	7-34	55	5	11.00
3	James Power	John Locke's	0-26	26	3	8.33
3	Kevin Campbell	Setanta	0-26	26	4	6.50

=== Miscellaneous ===
- Séamus Prendergast's total score of 5-20 is the highest ever by a player in a single Munster Championship campaign.
- The All-Ireland semi-final between Ardmore and Setanta, originally scheduled for 21 January, was postponed due to adverse weather conditions.
