= 1984 Waterford Senior Hurling Championship =

Annual hurling competition season

- Champions: Tallow (3rd title); Kieran Ryan (captain)
- Runners-up: Portlaw

The 1984 Waterford Senior Hurling Championship was the 84th staging of the Waterford Senior Hurling Championship since its establishment by the Waterford County Board in 1897.

Mount Sion were the defending champions.

Tallow won the championship after a 2–12 to 2–01 defeat of Portlaw in the final. This was their third championship title overall and a first title in four years.

== Results ==
=== Final ===
Final	Tallow	2-12 - 2-01	Portlaw	Walsh Park
	P Curley 1-3, C Curley 0-5, K Ryan 1-0, P Murphy 0-2, M Beecher and S Treacy 0-1 each.		E Rockett 1-0, P Kelly 1-0f, A Rockett 0-1.	Referee: J Moore (Éire Óg)
