= 1983 Waterford Senior Hurling Championship =

Annual hurling competition season

- Champions: Mount Sion (26th title)
- Runners-up: Ballyduff Upper

The 1983 Waterford Senior Hurling Championship was the 83rd staging of the Waterford Senior Hurling Championship since its establishment by the Waterford County Board in 1897.

Ballyduff Upper were the defending champions.

On 9 October 1983, Mount Sion won the championship after a 5–11 to 2–06 defeat of Ballyduff Upper in the final. This was their 26th championship title overall and their first title since 1981.
