= 1986 Waterford Senior Hurling Championship =

Annual hurling competition season

- Champions: Mount Sion (27th title); Stephen Greene (captain)
- Runners-up: Lismore

The 1986 Waterford Senior Hurling Championship was the 86th staging of the Waterford Senior Hurling Championship since its establishment by the Waterford County Board in 1897.

Tallow were the defending champions.

On 14 September 1986, Mount Sion won the championship after a 0–16 to 0–10 defeat of Lismore in the final. This was their 27th championship title overall and their first title since 1983.
