= 1974 Waterford Senior Hurling Championship =

Annual hurling competition season

- Champions: Mount Sion (23rd title)
- Runners-up: Portlaw

The 1974 Waterford Senior Hurling Championship was the 74th staging of the Waterford Senior Hurling Championship since its establishment by the Waterford County Board in 1897.

Portlaw were the defending champions.

On 15 September 1974, Mount Sion won the championship after a 3–08 to 2–10 defeat of Portlaw in the final. This was their 23rd championship title overall and their first title since 1972.
