= 1987 Waterford Senior Hurling Championship =

Annual hurling competition season

- Champions: Ballyduff Upper (2nd title)
- Runners-up: Roanmore

The 1987 Waterford Senior Hurling Championship was the 87th staging of the Waterford Senior Hurling Championship since its establishment by the Waterford County Board in 1897.

Mount Sion were the defending champions.

Ballyduff Upper won the championship after a 4–07 to 2–11 defeat of Roanmore in the final. This was their second championship title overall and a first title in five years.
