= 1990 Waterford Senior Hurling Championship =

Annual hurling competition season

- Champions: Roanmore (2nd title); Ray Sheridan (captain)
- Runners-up: Ballyduff Upper; Michael Leamy (captain)

The 1990 Waterford Senior Hurling Championship was the 90th staging of the Waterford Senior Hurling Championship since its establishment by the Waterford County Board in 1897.

Roanmore entered the championship as the defending champions.

The final was played on 7 October 1990 at Fraher Field in Dungarvan, between Roanmore and Ballyduff Upper, in what was their second consecutive meeting in the final. Roanmore won the match by 3–13 to 2–06 to claim their second championship title overall and a second championship title in succession.

== Knockout stage ==
=== Quarter-finals ===
9 September 1990 Quarter-final	Roanmore	2-13 - 3-07	Mount Sion	Walsh Park
	K Delahunty 0-7, K Sheridan 1-0, T Shanahan 1-0, E Nolan 0-2, N Crowley 0-1, G Maguire 0-1, A Burke 0-1, M Wadding 0-1.		J Meaney 1-2, K Ryan 1-0, M Flanagan 1-0, T Browne 0-1, G Fitzpatrick 0-1, P Fanning 0-1, S Ahearne 0-1, D Power 0-1.

9 September 1990 Quarter-final	Ballyduff Upper	1-14 - 0-08	Portlaw	Fraher Field
	M Walsh 0-8, S Hannon 1-0, P Prendergast 0-2, G Quirke 0-2, B Tobin 0-1, D Hannon 0-1.		T Larkin 0-4, S Fitzpatrick 0-2, M Whelan 0-1, P Coffey 0-1.

=== Semi-finals ===
23 September 1990 Semi-final	Roanmore	3-13 - 0-06	Tallow	Fraher Field
	K Delahunty 1-4, T Shanahan 1-1, Morrie Wadding 1-1, G McGuire 0-3, E Nolan 0-3, N Crowley 0-1.		P Murphy 0-3, M Curley 0-2, P Curley 0-1.

23 September 1990 Semi-final	Ballyduff Upper	3-11 - 1-06	Passage	Fraher Field
	M Walsh 0-7, B Tonin 1-1, J Quirke 1-1, C Feeney 1-0, G Quirke 0-1, P Prendergast 0-1.		M O'Keeffe 1-3, S Keating 0-1, S Carey 0-1, N Connors 0-1.

=== Final ===
7 October 1990 Final	Roanmore	3-13 - 2-06	Ballyduff Upper	Walsh Park
	K Delahunty 0-11, T Shanahan 2-1, F McGuire 1-1.		M Walsh 1-2, C Feeney 1-0, P Prendergast 0-2, Séamus Daly 0-2.
