= 2006 Waterford Senior Hurling Championship =

Annual hurling competition season

- Champions: Mount Sion (35th title); Eoin McGrath (captain); Páraic Fanning (manager)
- Runners-up: Ballygunner; Andy Moloney (captain); John Fitzpatrick (manager)

The 2006 Waterford Senior Hurling Championship was the 106th staging of the Waterford Senior Hurling Championship since its establishment by the Waterford County Board in 1897.

Ballygunner were the defending champions.

On 22 October 2006, Mount Sion won the championship after a 2–13 to 0–12 defeat of Ballygunner in the final. This was their 35th championship title overall and their first title since 2004.

== Results ==
=== Final ===
22 October 2006 Final	Mount Sion	2–13 – 0–12	Ballygunner	Fraher Field, Dungarvan
	K McGrath 0–7 (4f), M White 1–2, S Ryan 1–0, E McGrath 0–2, E Kelly 0–1.	Report	B Mullane 0–3, S O'Sullivan 0–3 (2f, 1 '65'), A Moloney, P Flynn 0–2 each, J Kearney, G O'Connor 0–1 each.	Referee: T O'Sullivan (Cappoquin-Affane)
