= 1972 Waterford Senior Hurling Championship =

Annual hurling competition season

- Teams: 13
- Champions: Mount Sion (22nd title)
- Runners-up: Dunhill

The 1972 Waterford Senior Hurling Championship was the 72nd staging of the Waterford Senior Hurling Championship since its establishment by the Waterford County Board in 1897. The draw for the opening round fixtures took place on 28 February 1972.

Portlaw were the defending champions.

On 10 September 1972, Mount Sion won the championship after a 2–10 to 2–08 defeat of Dunhill in the final. This was their 22nd championship title overall and their first title since 1969.
