= 1985 Waterford Senior Hurling Championship =

Annual hurling competition season

- Champions: Tallow (3rd title)
- Runners-up: Ballyduff Upper

The 1985 Waterford Senior Hurling Championship was the 85th staging of the Waterford Senior Hurling Championship since its establishment by the Waterford County Board in 1897.

Tallow were the defending champions.

Tallow won the championship after a 3–08 to 2–08 defeat of Ballyduff Upper in the final. This was their second consecutive championship title.

== Results ==
=== Final ===
15 September 1985 Final	Tallow	3-08 - 2-08	Ballyduff Upper	Fraher Field
	C Curley 0-6, P Daly 1-0, P Curley 1-0, L Moroney 1-0, J McDonald 0-1, M Curley 0-1.		Michael Walsh 2-4, G Prendergast 0-1, D Hannon 0-1, J Quirke 0-1, L Canning 0-1.
