= 1989 Waterford Senior Hurling Championship =

Annual hurling competition season

- Champions: Roanmore (1st title)
- Runners-up: Ballyduff Upper

The 1989 Waterford Senior Hurling Championship was the 89th staging of the Waterford Senior Hurling Championship since its establishment by the Waterford County Board in 1897.

Mount Sion were the defending champions.

Roanmore won the championship after a 3–08 to 2–07 defeat of Ballyduff Upper in the final. This was their first ever championship title.
