= 1975 Waterford Senior Hurling Championship =

Annual hurling competition season

- Champions: Mount Sion (24th title)
- Runners-up: Portlaw

The 1975 Waterford Senior Hurling Championship was the 75th staging of the Waterford Senior Hurling Championship since its establishment by the Waterford County Board in 1897.

Mount Sion were the defending champions.

On 19 October 1975, Mount Sion won the championship after a 6–04 to 2–07 defeat of Portlaw in the final. This was their 24th championship title overall and their second title in succession.
