= Anthony Kirwan =

Anthony Kirwan may refer to:

- Anthony Kirwan (hurler) (born 1974), Irish hurler
- Anthony Kirwan (priest) (died 1868), Irish Anglican priest
