= Peter Queally (hurler) =

Irish hurler and Gaelic footballer

Personal information
- Native name: Peadar Ó Caollaí (Irish)
- Born: 1970 (age 55–56) Ballydurn, County Waterford, Ireland
- Occupation: Garda Síochána
- Height: 5 ft 11 in (180 cm)

Sport
- Sport: Hurling
- Position: Midfield
Clubs
- Years: Club
- 1987–1997 1998–2000 1998–2000 2001–2011: Newtown/Ballydurn; Sarsfields; Glanmire; Newtown/Ballydurn
Club titles
- Waterford titles: 0
College
- Years: College
- 1993–1995: Garda College
College titles
- Fitzgibbon titles: 0
Inter-county*
Years	County	Apps (scores)
1989–2003 1989–1996; 2004	Waterford (SH); Waterford (SF)	20 (0–6)
Inter-county titles
- Munster titles: 1
- All-Irelands: 0
- NHL: 0
- All Stars: 0
- *Inter County team apps and scores correct as of 22:40, 4 September 2019.

Peter Queally (born 1970) is an Irish hurling manager and former dual player who was the manager of the Waterford senior team from 2024 until 2026. He played for club sides Newtown/Ballydurn, Sarsfields and Glanmire and was also a member of both Waterford senior teams over a 15-year period.

== Early life ==
Born and raised in Ballydurn, County Waterford, Queally first played hurling and Gaelic football as a schoolboy with St Augustine's College in Dungarvan. He lined out in all grades in both codes and was a member of the school's senior team that won the Burke Cup in 1988. Queally also played both codes during his time at the Garda College in Templemore.

== Club career ==
Queally began his club career at juvenile and underage levels with St Mary's, winning an Eastern MBFC medal in 1988. By that stage he had already progressed to adult level with the Newtown/Ballydurn club. After losing out to St Mary's in 1989, Queally was part of the Ballydurn team that beat Rinn Ó gCuanach in a second replay to win the Waterford JHC title in 1990.

With sister Gaelic football club Newtown, Queally lost back-to-back Waterford IFC before claiming a winners' medal in 1993 after a 0–12 to 0–11 defeat of Rinn Ó gCuanach in the final. His working life brought him to Cork in 1998 resulting in Queally transferring to the Sarsfields club. He spent three seasons in the Cork SHC, while also lining out as a footballer with Glanmire, before returning to Newtown-Ballydurn in 2001.

Queally's second spell with Newtown-Ballydurn saw another Waterford IFC final appearance in 2002, only to lose out to Clashmore. He won a second Waterford JHC medal in 2010, a full 20 years after he claimed his first, following a 1–9 to 0–7 defeat of Ballysaggart in the final. Queally retired from club hurling in 2011.

== Inter-county career ==
Queally began his inter-county career with Waterford as a dual player at minor level in 1988. His progression onto the Waterford under-21 teams was immediate, however, he ended his underage career without any success. Queally made his first appearances for the Waterford senior teams in National League games in 1989.

After bring his dual player status to an end in 1996, Queally spent the remainder of his inter-county career focussed on hurling. In May 1998, he was at midfield when Waterford qualified for their first national final in 35 years, only to lose the league final to Cork by 2–14 to 0–13. Queally was again at midfield later that season when Waterford were beaten by Clare in the 1998 Munster final replay.

Queally resurrected his inter-county football career in 1999 when he linked up with Waterford's junior team. He won a Munster JFC medal that year before later claiming an All-Ireland JFC medal following Waterford's 2–12 to 2–11 defeat of Meath in the final. Queally claimed his first hurling silverware three years later, when Waterford beat Tipperary by 2–23 to 3–12 in the 2002 Munster final. He came on as a substitute the following year when Cork beat Waterford by 3–16 to 3–12 in the 2003 Munster final. Queally brought his inter-county hurling career to an end shortly after this defeat, after leaving the panel having expressed no confidence in team manager Justin McCarthy. He returned to the Waterford senior football team for a brief spell in the 2004 National Football League.

== Inter-provincial career ==
Queally's performances at inter-county level resulted in his selection for Munster in their 1999 Railway Cup final defeat by Connacht. It was the first of four successive years in which he was selected for the team, with back-to-back victories over Leinster and Connacht in 2000 and 2001.

== Coaching career ==
Queally's first involvement in management came in December 2003 when he was appointed as trainer to the Waterford senior football team. By 2005 he had taken charge of Waterford's minor hurling team, however, his two seasons in charge ended without success with Waterford failing to even reach the Munster final.

Queally was also active on the club scene during this time, with his tenure as Waterford minor manager coinciding with a period as manager of the Dungarvan intermediate team. His two seasons in charge culminated with a defeat by Clonea in the 2006 final. Queally subsequently took charge of the Ballygunner senior team and guided them to a 1–18 to a 1–14 defeat by Ballyduff Upper in the 2007 final.

Queally returned to inter-county management in June 2008 when he became a selector with the Waterford senior hurling team under new manager Davy Fitzgerald. His first season as a selector ended with a 3–30 to 1–13 defeat by Kilkenny in the 2008 All-Ireland final. Queally stepped away from the team after his second season and returned to club management with Youghal where he took on a dual role as manager of the club's intermediate hurling and football teams. His second season with the hurlers ended with a 0–15 to 1–9 defeat by Courcey Rovers in the 2011 PIHC final.

Queally made another return to inter-county management when he succeeded Fergal Hartley as Waterford's under-21 manager in late 2012. His two years in charge ended without success. Queally's time in this role coincided with his tenure as manager of the Passage club. He guided the team to the Waterford SHC title after a 3–16 to 3–13 defeat of Ballygunner in the 2013 SHC final. A second Ballygunner-Passage final meeting in 2016 resulted in a 4–20 to 1–12 defeat for Queally's side.

After ending his time as Passage manager, Queally took charge of Abbeyside and guided the team to a 2–19 to 0–13 defeat by Ballygunner in the 2018 SHC final. He later improved the fortunes of the Roanmore club by reaching a first final in over 30 years, only to lose to Ballygunner in the 2021 SHC final.

In September 2022, Queally was added to Davy Fitzgerald's Waterford senior hurling management team as a selector. After two years in this role he succeeded Fitzgerald as team manager in August 2024.

Queally was appointed manager of the Waterford senior hurling team in 2024, he stepped down in 2026 after two years in charge.

== Honours ==
=== Player ===
St Augustine's College

- Burke Cup: 1988

St Mary's

- Eastern Minor B Football Championship: 1988

Newtown-Ballydurn

- Waterford Intermediate Football Championship: 1993
- Waterford Junior A Hurling Championship: 1990, 2010

Waterford

- Munster Senior Hurling Championship: 2002
- All-Ireland Junior Football Championship: 1999
- Munster Junior Football Championship: 1999

Munster

- Railway Cup: 2000, 2001

=== Management ===
Passage

- Waterford Senior Hurling Championship: 2013

Portlaw

- Waterford Intermediate Hurling Championship: 2024

Waterford

- National Hurling League Division 1B: 2025

Sporting positions
Preceded by	Waterford minor hurling team manager 2005–2006	Succeeded by
Preceded by Fergal Hartley	Waterford under-21 hurling team manager 2012–2014	Succeeded by Derek Lyons
Preceded by Davy Fitzgerald	Waterford senior hurling team manager 2024–2026	Succeeded by Stephen Molumphy
