= 2012 Waterford Senior Hurling Championship =

Annual hurling competition season

- Champions: De La Salle (3rd title); Kevin Moran (captain); Derek McGrath (manager)
- Runners-up: Dungarvan

The 2012 Waterford Senior Hurling Championship was the 112th staging of the Waterford Senior Hurling Championship since its establishment by the Waterford County Board in 1897.

Ballygunner were the defending champions.

On 14 October 2012, De La Salle won the championship after a 1–21 to 0–12 defeat of Dungarvan in the final. This was their third championship title overall and their first title since 2010. It remains their last championship victory.

== Results ==
=== Final ===
14 October 2012 Final	De La Salle	1–21 – 0–12	Dungarvan	Fraher Field, Dungarvan
	J Dillon 1–5 (0–4 fs); J Keane, J Mullane 0–3 each; B Phelan (0–2 fs), P Nevin, J Kennedy, S McNulty 0–2 each; E Barrett, D Twomey 0–1 each.	Report	Cormac Curran 0–9 (0–7 fs, 0–2 65s); Colm Curran, S Ryan, G Crotty 0–1 each.	Referee: M Wadding (Roanmore)
