= Brian Hanley =

Irish hurler

Personal information
- Native name: Briain Ó hÁinle (Irish)
- Born: 1974 (age 51–52) Athenry, County Galway, Ireland

Sport
- Sport: Hurling
- Position: Midfield
Club
- Years: Club
- 1994-2007: Athenry
Club titles
- Galway titles: 7
- Connacht titles: 7
- All-Ireland Titles: 3

Brian Hanley (born 1974) is an Irish hurling coach and former who played as a midfielder for the Athenry senior hurling team.

Hanley enjoyed a successful playing career at club level with Athenry at the height of their power throughout the nineties. He was a midfielder with that team and collected three All-Ireland medals, seven Connacht medals and seven county club championship medals.

In retirement from playing, Hanley has become involved in team management. At club level, he has served as manager and assistant with the Liam Mellows and Garrycastle senior teams. Hanley was appointed manager of the Westmeath senior hurling team in April 2011.

== Playing career ==
=== Club ===
Hanley played during a golden age for the Athenry senior hurling team.

In 1994, he lined out in his first championship decider at senior level. Sarsfield's provided the opposition on that occasion. However, Athenry triumphed by 2-6 to 0-9. It was Hanley's first county club championship winners' medal. Athenry subsequently represented Galway in the provincial championship. A 3-20 to 2-3 trouncing of St. Dominic's gave Hanley a Connacht medal to add to his collection.

After surrendering their championship titles in 1995, Athenry reached the county final again in 1996. A 2-6 to 1-6 defeat of Carnmore gave Hanley his second county championship medal. A second Connacht medal quickly followed before Hanley's side qualified for the All-Ireland final. Wolfe Tones from Clare were the opponents. However, Athenry secured the title with a 0-14 to 1-8 victory. It was Hanley's first All-Ireland medal.

Once again, Athenry surrendered their three titles in 1997. However, Hanley won a third county championship medal in 1998 following a draw and a replay with Abbey-Duniry. A 6-24 to 0-5 demolition of Tooreen gave Hanley a third Connacht medal.

Hanley secured a fourth county championship medal in 1999, as Athenry retained their title following another victory over Abbey-Duniry. A fourth Connacht medal quickly followed as Tooreen were accounted for once again in the provincial decider. An All-Ireland final meeting with St. Joseph's Doora-Barefield soon followed. A 0-16 to 0-12 victory in that game gave Hanley a second All-Ireland medal.

Athenry made it three county championships-in-a-row in 2000 following a 2-14 to 3-7 defeat of Sarsfield's. Hanley later added a fifth Connacht medal to his collection following a defeat of Four Roads. Athenry later reached the All-Ireland final with Graigue-Ballycallan providing the opposition. A thrilling 3-24 to 2-19 extra-time victory gave Hanley a third All-Ireland winners' medal while Athenry became the second club ever to retain the title.

Four-in-a-row proved beyond Athenry. However, Hanley picked up a sixth county championship medal in 2002. He later won a sixth Connacht medal as Four Roads were defeated yet again.

Athenry failed to retain their county and provincial crowns in 2003. However, Hanley won a seventh county championship medal in 2004 following a two-point defeat of Portumna. He subsequently won a seventh Connacht medal as Ballyhaunis were heavily defeated by 2-16 to 0-7. Athenry later reached the All-Ireland decider where James Stephens provided the opposition. A fourth All-Ireland title proved beyond the westerners as James Stephens had a commanding 0-19 to 0-14 win over Hanley's side.

== Managerial career ==
=== Club management ===
In retirement from playing, Hanley has become involved in team management. He took charge of the Liam Mellows senior hurling team but enjoyed little success. Hanley also assisted Anthony Cunningham during his successful tenure as manager of the Garrycastle senior football manager.

=== Westmeath manager ===
Hanley was appointed interim manager of the Westmeath senior hurling team in April 2011 following the removal of Kevin Martin from the post. His first season in charge saw Westmeath defeat Carlow in the championship before being defeated by Galway and Antrim.

Following Hanley's success as interim manager, he was appointed on a full-time basis. His second season in charge saw Westmeath narrowly miss out on promotion to Division 1B of the National Hurling League. Westmeath later defeated Antrim in their opening championship game before later giving eventual provincial winners Galway a fright in a thrilling 5-19 to 4-12 defeat. Hanley's charges later exited the championship at the hands of Wexford.

=== Galway Minor manager ===
Hanley took over the Galway Minor management job from the hugely successful Jeffrey Lynskey in 2019, enjoying immediate success in his first season in charge by winning the All Ireland Minor Hurling Championship. On 18 August 2019, Galway won the championship after a 3-14 to 0-12 defeat of Kilkenny in the All-Ireland final. This was their 13th title overall and their third title in succession. He was due to take charge again in 2020, however the championship was suspended due to the Coronavirus pandemic.

== Honours ==
=== Team ===
Athenry

- All-Ireland Senior Club Hurling Championship (3): 1997, 2000, 2001
- Connacht Senior Club Hurling Championship (7): 1994, 1996, 1998, 1999, 2000, 2002, 2004
- Galway Senior Club Hurling Championship (7): 1994, 1996, 1998, 1999, 2000, 2002, 2004

Sporting positions
Preceded by Kevin Martin	Westmeath senior hurling team manager 2011-2014	Succeeded by Michael Ryan
Preceded by Jeffrey Lynskey	Galway minor hurling team manager 2018-2021	Succeeded by Fergal Healy
Preceded by Jeffrey Lynskey	Galway under-20 hurling team manager 2021-	Succeeded by Incumbent
