= Kevin Moran (hurler) =

Irish hurler

Personal information
- Native name: Caoimhín Ó Móráin (Irish)
- Born: 3 March 1987 (age 39) Waterford, Ireland
- Occupation: Secondary school teacher
- Height: 6 ft 2 in (188 cm)

Sport
- Sport: Hurling
- Position: Midfield
Club
- Years: Club
- 2004–present: De La Salle
Club titles
- Waterford titles: 3
- Munster titles: 2
- All-Ireland Titles: 0
College
- Years: College
- 2006–2008: Waterford Institute of Technology
College titles
- Fitzgibbon titles: 2
Inter-county*
Years	County	Apps (scores)
2006–2021	Waterford	24 (0–29)
Inter-county titles
- Munster titles: 2
- All-Irelands: 0
- NHL: 2
- All Stars: 2
- *Inter County team apps and scores correct as of 18:33, 28 October 2012.

Kevin Moran (born 3 March 1987) is an Irish hurler who plays for De La Salle and formerly of the Waterford county hurling team. He is also a teacher in De La Salle College Waterford.

Moran made his first appearance for the team during the 2006 championship and became a regular member of the starting fifteen over the following few seasons. Since then he has won two Munster winners' medals, two National League winners' medals and one All-Star award. Moran has ended up as an All-Ireland runner-up on three occasions.

At club level Moran is a two-time Munster medalist with De La Salle. In addition to this he has also won three county club championship winners' medals.

== Playing career ==
=== Club ===
Moran plays his club hurling with the De La Salle club and has enjoyed much success.

He was still a minor when he made his senior debut as a seventeen-year-old in 2004, however, he quickly became a key member of the De La Salle team. In 2005 Moran lined out in his first championship decider as De La Salle faced Ballygunner. A narrow 2–10 to 1–12 defeat was Moran's lot on that occasion.

After a number of years of early exits in the county championship, De La Salle reached the championship final again in 2008. Abbeyside were the opponents on that occasion and a close game developed. At the final whistle De La Salle were the champions by 0–11 to 0–9 and Moran collected his first county championship medal. De La Salle subsequently represented Waterford in the provincial series and even reached the final. A narrow 1–9 to 0–10 defeat of Adare gave Moran a first Munster medal. Moran's side later reached the All-Ireland decider where Portumna provided the opposition. De La Salle were well beaten on that occasion by 2–24 to 1–8.

After surrendering their county and provincial titles in 2009, De La Salle bounced back the following year to reach the county final once again. A 3–13 to 1–11 defeat of Ballygunner gave Moran a second championship medal. He later added a second Munster medal to his collection following a one-point defeat of Thurles Sarsfield's.

Two years later Moran won a third county championship medal as De La Salle trounced Dungarvan by 1–21 to 0–12 in the county final.

=== Inter-varsities ===
Moran also enjoyed much success with the Waterford Institute of Technology (WIT) in the universities and colleges series of games. In 2006 he was full-back on the WIT team that took on University College Dublin (UCD) in the final. A 4–13 to 0–8 trouncing of UCD gave Moran a Fitzgibbon Cup medal.

Two years later WIT were back in the final, this time with Moran as captain. A narrow 0–16 to 1–12 defeat of the Limerick Institute of Technology (LIT) gave Moran a second Fitzgibbon Cup medal.

=== Inter-county ===
Moran made his senior debut for Waterford in a National League game against Wexford in 2006. Later that year he made his championship debut during the All-Ireland qualifiers.

In 2007 Moran was still a peripheral figure on the Waterford team. He was a non-playing substitute as Waterford won the National Hurling League title following a 0–20 to 0–18 defeat of Kilkenny. Moran, however, later claimed his first Munster medal as Waterford defeated Limerick by 3–17 to 1–14 in the provincial decider. While Waterford were viewed as possibly going on and winning the All-Ireland title for the first time in almost half a century, Limerick ambushed Moran's side in the subsequent All-Ireland semi-final.

2008 began poorly for Waterford as the team lost their opening game to Clare as well as their manager Justin McCarthy. In spite of this poor start Moran's side reached the All-Ireland final for the first time in forty-five years. Kilkenny provided the opposition and went on to trounce Waterford by 3–30 to 1–13 to claim a third All-Ireland title in-a-row.

Moran lined out in another Munster final in 2010 with Cork providing the opposition. A 2–15 apiece draw was the result on that occasion, however, Waterford went on to win the replay after an extra-time goal by Dan Shanahan. It was a second Munster winners' medal for Moran. In spite of a disappointing season for Waterford in 2012, Moran was presented with his first All-Star award. On 3 May 2015, Moran was captain as Waterford won their first league title since 2007 after a 1–24 to 0–17 win against Cork in the final.

On 3 September 2017, Moran was captain and scored an early goal as Waterford lost the 2017 All-Ireland Senior Hurling Final to Galway.

On 1 November 2021, Moran announced his retirement from inter-county hurling after 16 years.

== Honours ==
=== Team ===
Waterford Institute of Technology

- Fitzgibbon Cup: 2006, 2008 (c)

De La Salle

- Munster Senior Club Hurling Championship: 2008, 2010
- Waterford Senior Hurling Championship: 2008, 2010, 2012 (c)

Waterford

- Munster Senior Hurling Championship: 2007, 2010
- National Hurling League: 2007, 2015 (c)

=== Individual ===
- All-Stars: 2012, 2017

Sporting positions
Preceded by Michael Walsh	Waterford Senior Hurling Captain; 2013	Succeeded by Michael Walsh
Preceded by Michael Walsh	Waterford Senior Hurling Captain; 2015-2018	Succeeded by Noel Connors
Achievements
Preceded by Kieran Murphy	Fitzgibbon Cup Final winning captain 2008	Succeeded by Kevin Hartnett
