= Michael Ryan (hurler, born 1955) =

Irish hurler and Gaelic footballer

Personal information
- Native name: Mícheál Ó Riain (Irish)
- Born: 9 August 1955 (age 71) Ballymacarbry, County Waterford, Ireland

Sport
- Sport: Hurling
Club
- Years: Club
- Fourmilewater / Nire
Club titles
- Waterford titles: 3

Michael Ryan (born 9 August 1955) is an Irish former hurler and Gaelic footballer who played in various positions for The Nire–Fourmilewater club teams.

In retirement from playing Ryan became involved in team management. As manager and selector of the Waterford, Laois and Dublin inter-county teams he has won seven All-Ireland. With the Ballymacarbry ladies' football team Ryan won multiple All-Ireland club titles, while he also gained a wealth of experience training various club teams in hurling.

Ryan was the manager of the Waterford senior hurling team for the 2012 and 2013 seasons and took over as Westmeath senior hurling team manager in October 2014.

== Playing career ==
=== Club ===
Ryan played hurling with the Fourmilewater club and Gaelic football with the sister club called The Nire. He won a county minor championship medal as a midfielder and played with their adult teams up until he was 35 years old. He began coaching/training Fourmilewater hurling Team in 1979 and won an intermediate county medal playing at full forward that year. In 1983 he trained/coached The Nire football team that won the county Intermediate championship whilst playing at corner forward. He was a member of The Nire team that was beaten in the senior county final in 1987 and 1989 and retired from playing in 1990.

== Managerial career ==
=== Ladies' football ===
Ryan made a name for himself as coach of the Ballymacarbry club team. As the new All-Ireland club championship emerged in the late eighties, Ryan's Ballymacarbry won their first All-Ireland title in 1989. It was the first of a remarkable nine All-Ireland titles in ten years.

As a result of his success at club level, Ryan took charge of the Waterford senior ladies' football team in the early nineties. In 1991 the team reached the All-Ireland final for the first time. Laois provided the opposition, however, Ryan's team prevailed on a score line of 5–8 to 3–7. Waterford made it two-in-a-row in 1992 with another defeat of Laois.

After being beaten in their attempt for three-in-a-row, Waterford reached the All-Ireland decider again in 1994. A 2–10 to 0–12 defeat of Monaghan gave Ryan a third All-Ireland title as manager. Waterford retained their title in 1995, following another defeat of Monaghan.

Monaghan got the better of Waterford in 1997, however, the teams faced off again in the All-Ireland decider of 1998, the first Ladies football final that was ever televised live. A draw was the result on that occasion, however, Ryan's side went on to win the replay by 2–14 to 3–8. It was a fifth All-Ireland title for Waterford and for Ryan. It also proved to be a swansong for Ryan's great Waterford team.

In 2001 Ryan coached the Laois ladies football team that won the All-Ireland Senior title, defeating Mayo by 2–14 to 1–16.

In 2010 Ryan was a selector with the Dublin ladies' football team that won the All-Ireland title for the first time in their history.

Ryan has managed/trained/coached 32 All-Ireland winning Ladies Football teams.

=== Hurling ===
After serving as a selector with the Waterford under-21 football team that defeated Kerry in the Munster Championship replay in 2000, Ryan became a much sought-after hurling coach by the latter half of the decade.

In 2007 Ryan joined Justin McCarthy's backroom team with the Waterford senior hurling team. That year Waterford won the National Hurling League following a defeat of Kilkenny by 0–20 to 0–18. Ryan's side later claimed the Munster title as Waterford defeated Limerick by 3–17 to 1–14 in the provincial decider. While Waterford were viewed as possibly going on and winning the All-Ireland title for the first time in almost half a century, Limerick ambushed Ryan's side in the All-Ireland semi-final.

Later that year Ryan was in charge of the Munster team that contested the Inter-provincial Championship. The southern province defeat Connacht in the final by 2–22 to 2–19 to take the title.

Two years later in 2009 Ryan was coaxed to take charge of the Mullinahone club team in Tipperary. It was a successful tenure as the club won the South Tipperary championship.

In 2010 Ryan was in charge of De La Salle in Waterford. In his only season with the team he guided De La Salle to a 3–13 to 1–11 defeat of Ballygunner in the championship final. The Waterford champions later added the Munster title to their collection following a one-point win over Thurles Sarsfields, De La Salle then played Clarinbridge in the semi-final in Semple Stadium Thurles and the game ended in a draw, extra time was played and De La Salle held a two point lead with time almost up before Clarinbridge scored a late goal to edge one of the best games of hurling ever seen in the club championship.

Michael guided St Mary's Hurling Club of Clonmel to County Intermediate Championship success in 2017.

=== Waterford ===
Ryan was ratified as manager of the Waterford senior hurling team on 17 October 2011. From the start Ryan was under severe pressure as Waterford failed to pick up any points from their opening three games of the National League. In spite of this Waterford preserved their top flight status and avoided a relegation battle. The subsequent championship campaign saw Waterford reach a third successive Munster final, however, they were defeated by Tipperary. Ryan's side exited the championship at the next stage following a defeat by Cork in the All-Ireland quarter-final. Waterford enjoyed a very good league campaign in 2013 beating Clare in Ennis in round one and then drawing with Cork in Dungarvan, they were then narrowly beaten by Kilkenny in Nolan Park. In round four they defeated Tipperary in a thriller in Walsh Park before losing to Galway by three points in Round five, they comfortably retained their league one status. In the championship Waterford led Clare by four points at half time but hit a succession of wides as Clare ran out winners on the way to winning the All Ireland title. In the qualifiers Waterford defeated Offaly in Tullamore and Westmeath in Mullingar before facing Kilkenny in round three in Semple Stadium. This thrilling game ended in a draw, Waterfords best result in a championship v kilkenny since 1959 however Kilkenny were narrow victors after extra time. On 12 August 2013, Ryan, unhappy with some events that happened behind the scenes stepped down as manager, making it known to the county board that he would not be looking to extend his tenure for the 2014 season.

=== Westmeath ===
In October 2014, Ryan was confirmed as the new manager of the Westmeath hurling team.

== Career statistics ==
=== Manager ===
As of match played 5 June 2016.

Team	From	To	Pre-season				National League				Provincial				All-Ireland				Total				
Team	From	To	G	W	D	L	G	W	D	L	G	W	D	L	G	W	D	L	G	W	D	L	Win %
Waterford	17 October 2011	12 August 2013	3	1	0	2	10	4	1	5	3	1	0	2	4	2	0	2	20	8	1	11	40
Westmeath	8 October 2014	Present	5	1	0	4	13	9	0	4	8	5	0	3	1	0	0	1	27	15	0	12	55

Sporting positions
Preceded by Davy Fitzgerald	Waterford Senior Hurling Manager; 2011–2013	Succeeded by Derek McGrath
Preceded by Brian Hanley	Westmeath Senior Hurling Manager; 2014–2018	Succeeded by Joe Quaid
