= 1981 Waterford Senior Hurling Championship =

Annual hurling competition season

- Champions: Mount Sion (25th title)
- Runners-up: Dunhill

The 1981 Waterford Senior Hurling Championship was the 81st staging of the Waterford Senior Hurling Championship since its establishment by the Waterford County Board in 1897.

Tallow were the defending champions.

On 4 October 1981, Mount Sion won the championship after a 4–13 to 1–14 defeat of Dunhill in the final. This was their 25th championship title overall and their first title since 1975.
