= 1908 Waterford Senior Hurling Championship =

Annual hurling competition season

- Champions: Dungarvan (1st title)
- Runners-up: Dunhill

The 1908 Waterford Senior Hurling Championship was the 9th staging of the Waterford Senior Hurling Championship since its establishment by the Waterford County Board in 1897.

Clonea were the defending champions.

Dungarvan won the championship after a defeat of Dunhill in the final. This was their first ever championship title.
