= Declan Prendergast =

Irish hurler (born 1981)

Personal information
- Native name: Déaglán de Priondragás (Irish)
- Born: 25 March 1981 (age 45) Ardmore, County Waterford, Ireland
- Height: 6 ft 2 in (188 cm)

Sport
- Sport: Hurling
- Position: Left wing-back
Club
- Years: Club
- Ardmore
Club titles
| | Football | Hurling |
| Waterford titles | 0 | 0 |
Inter-county
| Years | County | Apps (scores) |
| 2001–2012 | Waterford | 35 (0–3) |
Inter-county titles
- Munster titles: 3
- All-Irelands: 1
- NHL: 1
- All Stars: 0

Declan Prendergast (born 4 October 1981) is an Irish hurler who played as a left wing-back at senior level for the Waterford county team.

Prendergast joined the team during the 2001 National League and was a regular member of the starting fifteen until his retirement prior to the 2012 championship. During that time he won three Munster medals and one National Hurling League medal. Prendergast ended up as an All-Ireland runner-up on one occasion.

At club level Prendergast is a dual player with Ardmore.

His brother, Séamus Prendergast, also played inter-county hurling with Waterford.

== Playing career ==
=== Club ===
Prendergast plays his club hurling and Gaelic football with Ardmore.

In 2002, he won a county intermediate hurling championship medal following a 2–5 to 0–10 defeat of Clonea.

=== Inter-county ===
Prendergast made his senior debut for Waterford in a National League game against Tipperary in 2001; however, he remained on the periphery for another two seasons.

By 2004, Prendergast was a regular member of the starting fifteen. That year, Waterford qualified for a third successive Munster final with Cork providing the opposition again. Described as the game with everything, Waterford beat Cork by 3–16 to 1–21 to win one of the greatest hurling games ever played. It was Prendergast's first Munster medal. The subsequent All-Ireland semi-final saw Waterford take on a wounded Kilkenny team. Despite this 'the Cats' were the winners by 3–12 to 0–18.

Three years later, Prendergast added a National Hurling League medal to his collection when Waterford defeated Kilkenny by 0–20 to 0–18 in the final. He later claimed a second Munster medal as Waterford defeated Limerick by 3–17 to 1–14 in the provincial decider. While Waterford were viewed as possibly going on and winning the All-Ireland title for the first time in almost half a century, Limerick ambushed Prendergast's side in the All-Ireland semi-final.

2008 began poorly for Waterford as the team lost their opening game to Clare as well as their manager Justin McCarthy. Despite this poor start, Prendergast's side reached the All-Ireland final for the first time in forty-five years. Kilkenny provided the opposition and went on to trounce Waterford by 3–30 to 1–13 to claim a third All-Ireland title in a row.

Prendergast lined up in another Munster final in 2010, with Cork providing the opposition. A 2–15 apiece draw was the result on that occasion. However, Waterford won the replay after an extra-time goal by Dan Shanahan. It was the third Munster winners' medal for Prendergast.

In April 2012, Prendergast announced his retirement from inter-county hurling saying "I just feel I have enough done at this stage, I'm involved for 12 years and feel that that's probably enough".

Prendergast joined the Waterford junior football team in 2012 despite his hurling retirement.

=== Inter-provincial ===
Prendergast also lined out with Munster in the inter-provincial series of games.
