= 1982 Waterford Senior Hurling Championship =

Annual hurling competition season

- Champions: Ballyduff Upper (1st title)
- Runners-up: Dunhill

The 1982 Waterford Senior Hurling Championship was the 82nd staging of the Waterford Senior Hurling Championship since its establishment by the Waterford County Board in 1897.

Mount Sion were the defending champions.

Ballyduff Upper won the championship after a 0–20 to 1–11 defeat of Dunhill in the final. This was their first championship title. It was Dunhill's third successive defeat in a final.
