= Séamus Prendergast =

Irish hurler (born 1980)

Personal information
- Native name: Séamus de Priondragás (Irish)
- Born: 1 January 1980 (age 46) Ardmore, County Waterford, Ireland
- Height: 1.88 m (6 ft 2 in)

Sport
- Sport: Hurling
- Position: Centre-forward
Club
- Years: Club
- Ardmore
Club titles
- Waterford titles: 0
Inter-county*
| Years | County | Apps (scores) |
| 2000–2014 | Waterford | 58 (2–47) |
Inter-county titles
- Munster titles: 4
- All-Irelands: 0
- NHL: 1
- All Stars: 0
- *Inter County team apps and scores correct as of 21:48, 16 October 2014.

Séamus Prendergast (born 1 January 1980) is an Irish hurler who played as a centre-forward at senior level for the Waterford county team.

Born in Ardmore, County Waterford, Prendergast first played competitive hurling in his youth. He first arrived on the inter-county scene as a member of various Waterford teams at underage levels. Prendergast joined the senior panel during the 2001 championship and subsequently became a regular member of the starting fifteen. He went on to win four Munster medals and one National Hurling League medal. Prendergast was an All-Ireland runner-up on one occasion.

As a member of the Munster inter-provincial team on a number of occasions, Prendergast won one Railway Cup medal. At club level he is a two-time championship medallist in the intermediate grade with Ardmore.

His brother, Declan Prendergast, also had a lengthy career with Waterford.

Throughout his career Prendergast made 58 championship appearances. He announced his retirement from inter-county hurling on 14 October 2014.

== Playing career ==
=== Club ===
Prendergast plays his club hurling and Gaelic football with Ardmore and has enjoyed some success.

In 2002 he won his first championship medal in the intermediate grade following a narrow 2–5 to 0–10 defeat of Clonea.

After a period in the senior ranks, Ardmore found themselves back in the intermediate grade again by 2013. That year Prendergast won a second championship medal as Ardmore defeated Dunhill by 0–23 to 2–13.

=== Inter-county ===
Prendergast made his senior debut for Waterford in a National League game against Derry in 2001. As the first Ardmore man to play senior inter-county hurling for Waterford, he immediately became a regular member of the starting fifteen. On 10 June 2001 Prendergast made his championship debut against Limerick in a Munster semi-final. In spite of scoring a goal after just two minutes, Prendergast's side were defeated by 4–11 to 2–14.

In 2002 Waterford emerged from the doldrums by reaching the Munster final where they faced reigning champions Tipperary. A high-scoring game produced a 2–23 to 3–12 victory for Waterford. Not only was it a first Munster medal for Prendergasr but it was Waterford's first provincial crown in thirty-nine years.

After surrendering the Munster title to Cork in 2003, Prendergast's side were back in the provincial showpiece for a third successive year in 2004. In the Munster final, Waterford defeated Cork for the first time in forty-five years, with Prendergast winning a second Munster medal following a 3–16 to 1–21 victory. An All-Ireland appearance subsequently eluded the team yet again.

The following few years proved difficult for Prendergast. Waterford crashed out of the early stages of the provincial championship in 2005 and 2006. On both these occasions his team was defeated by Cork in the All-Ireland series.

In 2007 Prendergast added a National Hurling League medal to his collection when Waterford defeated Kilkenny by 0–20 to 0–18 in the final. He later claimed a third Munster medal as Waterford defeated Limerick by 3–17 to 1–14 in the provincial decider. While Waterford were viewed as possibly going on and winning the All-Ireland title for the first time in almost half a century, Limerick ambushed Waterford in the All-Ireland semi-final.

2008 began poorly for Waterford as the team lost their opening game to Clare as well as their manager Justin McCarthy. In spite of this poor start Prendergast's side reached the All-Ireland final for the first time in forty-five years. Kilkenny provided the opposition and went on to defeat Waterford by 3–30 to 1–13 to claim a third All-Ireland title in-a-row.

Prendergast lined out in another Munster final in 2010 with Cork providing the opposition once again. A 2-15 apiece draw was the result on that occasion, however, Waterford went on to win the replay after an extra-time goal by Dan Shanahan. It was a fourth Munster medal for Prendergast.

The following few years sew Waterford go into decline. Prendergast played his last game for Waterford on 19 July 2014 in a 3–15 to 2–15 defeat by Wexford.

=== Inter-provincial ===
Prendergast also lined out with Munster in the inter-provincial hurling championship. In 2005 a 1–21 to 2–14 defeat of Leinster gave him a Railway Cup medal.

== Recognition ==
Prendergast is regarded by his peers as one of Waterford's greatest-ever servants.

Kevin Moran, one of Prendergast's teammates, said of him upon his retirement: "He was one of the true greats, he was one of the team’s great leaders. He led on and off the field. His hurling did the talking and then when needed he would offer the required words off the field. In the last couple of years he took the panel’s younger members under his wing, showed them ropes. His experience was vital. Seamus was a guy I looked up to and who showed me the ropes when I came on board.".

== Honours ==
=== Player ===
Ardmore

- Waterford Intermediate Hurling Championship (2): 2002, 2013
- Munster Junior Club Hurling Championship (1): 2017
- All-Ireland Junior Club Hurling Championship (1): 2018

Waterford

- Munster Senior Hurling Championship (4): 2002, 2004, 2007, 2010
- National Hurling League (1): 2007

Munster

- Inter-provincial Championship (1): 2005
