= Ardmore GAA =

Gaelic Athletic Association club based in Ireland

Ardmore GAA Club
- Ard Mór
- County: Waterford
- Colours: Blue and White
- Grounds: Ardmore
- Coordinates: 51°57′36.51″N 7°43′44.00″W

Playing kits
Standard colours

Senior Club Championships
	All Ireland	Munster champions	Waterford champions
Football:	-	-	2

Ardmore GAA is a Gaelic Athletic Association club based in the West Waterford town of Ardmore, Ireland. The club plays both hurling and gaelic football. It is generally thought to focus more on Gaelic football, having won 2 Senior Football Championships in 1965 and 1977. Recently the club has put more effort into hurling, winning the Waterford Intermediate Hurling Championship for the first time in 2000.

== Notable players ==
- Clinton Hennessy
- Declan Prendergast
- Séamus Prendergast

== Honours ==
- All-Ireland Junior Club Hurling Championships: 1
  - 2018
- Waterford Senior Hurling Championships: 0
- Munster Junior Club Hurling Championships: 1
  - 2017
- Waterford Junior Hurling Championship: (4)
  - 1979, 2001, 2017, 2023
- Waterford Senior Football Championships: 2
  - 1965, 1977
- Waterford Intermediate Football Championship: (2)
  - 1972, 1997
- Waterford Intermediate Hurling Championship (2)
  - 2002, 2013
- Waterford Junior Football Championship (1)
  - 1961
- Waterford Under-21 Hurling Championship (1)
  - 2000 | Runner-Up 2001
- Waterford Under-21 Football Championship (3)
  - 2000, 2001, 2002
- Waterford Minor Football Championship: (4)
  - 1966, 1997, 1998, 1999 | Runners-Up 1962, 1965, 1996
