= 2026 Waterford Senior Hurling Championship =

Annual hurling competition season

- Dates: 3 July – 30 August 2026
- Teams: 12
- Sponsor: JJ Kavanagh and Sons
- Champions: Ballygunner (25th title); Michael Mahony (captain); Peter Hogan (captain) (captain); Jason Ryan (manager)
- Runners-up: Fourmilewater; Ian Hanrahan (captain); Dick O'Keeffe (manager)
- Relegated: Ballygunner B Dungarvan; Ferrybank

Tournament statistics
- Matches played: 37
- Goals scored: 92 (2.49 per match)
- Points scored: 1398 (37.78 per match)
- Top scorer(s): Aaron Ryan (3–77)

The 2026 Waterford Senior Hurling Championship was the 126th staging of the Waterford Senior Hurling Championship since its establishment by the Waterford County Board in 1897. The draw for the group stage pairings was made on 9 February 2026. The championship ran from 3 July to 30 August 2026.

Ballygunner were the defending champions. Dungarvan's relegation brought an end to 17 years of top tier hurling for the club.

The final was played on 30 August 2026 at Cappoquin Logistics Fraher Field in Dungarvan, between Ballygunner and first time finalists Fourmilewater. Ballygunner won the match by 1–16 to 0–15 to claim their 25th championship title overall and a 13th consecutive title.

Fourmilewater's Aaron Ryan was the championship's top scorer with 3–77.

== Format change ==
Waterford County Board was granted deviation by Central Council to allow two Ballygunner teams to take part in the competition. The preliminary quarter-finals were abolished, with the top four teams in each group now progressing to the quarter-finals. The two bottom sides will be relegated, along with Ballygunner B, with the two fifth-placed teams finished for the season as the number of teams is reduced to 10 in 2027.

== Team changes ==
=== To Championship ===
Promoted from the Waterford Premier Intermediate Hurling Championship

- Ballygunner B

=== From Championship ===
Relegated to the Waterford Premier Intermediate Hurling Championship

- Brickey Rangers

== Group A ==
=== Group A table ===
Quarter-finalists Relegated

Team	Matches				Score			Pts
Team	Pld	W	D	L	For	Against	Diff	Pts
Ballygunner A	5	5	0	0	158	82	76	10
De La Salle	5	3	1	1	111	108	3	7
Abbeyside	5	3	0	2	125	119	6	6
Passage	5	2	0	3	101	121	-20	4
Clonea	5	1	1	3	117	129	-12	3
Ferrybank	5	0	0	5	90	143	-53	0

=== Group A results ===
3 July 2026 Round 1	Clonea	4-14 - 2-25	Abbeyside	Cappoquin Logistics Fraher Field
	B Power 1-2, J Power 1-2, F Roche 0-5, T Skehan 1-1, S Curry 1-0, G Power 0-1, A Gleeson 0-1, D Flynn 0-1	Report	C Treen 1-8, N Montgomery 1-2, M Kiely 0-4, W Beresford 0-3, E Kiely 0-2 (2f), B Callaghan 0-1, R Prunty 0-1, M O'Halloran 0-1, R Walsh 0-1, S Callaghan 0-1, D Walsh 0-1

3 July 2026 Round 1	Passage	0-15 - 2-28	Ballygunner A	Azzurri Walsh Park
	T Carey (0-8; 0-6f; 0-1 ‘65); M Fitzgerald (0-3); P Walsh (0-2); D Cullinane and L Flynn (0-1 each)	Report	D Hutchinson (1-7; 0-5f); M Hartley (0-8; 0-1 ‘65); K Mahony (0-5); E Cuddihy (1-0); C Power and P Hogan (0-3 each); C Tobin and M Mahony (0-1 each)

5 July 2026 Round 1	De La Salle	1-19 - 0-17	Ferrybank	Azzurri Walsh Park
	C Dawson 0-7, J Jacob 1-1, J Twomey 0-3, S Power 0-3, S Flynn 0-2, S O'Brien 0-2, C Morris 0-1.		M O'Brien 0-14, R McGarrity 0-1, R Carew 0-1, N O'Sullivan 0-1.

10 July 2026 Round 2	Passage	2-19 - 0-23	Clonea	Azzurri Walsh Park
	T Carey 0-7 (4f, 1 '65), M Fitzgerald 0-6, R Jacob 1-2, D Cullinane 1-0, P Walsh 0-1, K Cullinane 0-1, L Flynn 0-1, B Cullinane 0-1.	Report	F Roche 0-10 (9f), G Power 0-4, K Power 0-2, B Power 0-2, M Power 0-1, A Murray 0-1, M Curry 0-1, J Power 0-1, T Skehan 0-1.

11 July 2026 Round 2	Ferrybank	3-13 - 3-23	Abbeyside	Cappoquin Logistics Fraher Field
	M O'Brien 0-10 (5f, 1 '65), R McGarrity 3-1, N O'Sullivan 0-2.	Report	C Treen 1-7, E Kiely 0-7 (5f), N Montgomery 1-2, R Walsh 1-1, M Kiely 0-3, S Callaghan 0-2, C Prunty 0-1.

12 July 2026 Round 2	De La Salle	0-18 - 1-27	Ballygunner A	Azzurri Walsh Park
	C Dawson (0-7; 0-4f); J Twomey (0-6); S O’Brien, D Keane, S Power, M Costigan, B Cunningham (0-1 each).	Report	D Hutchinson (0-10; 0-8f); C Tobin (1-1); K Mahony and M Mahony (0-4 each); M Hartley (0-3); C Sheahan (0-2); C Power, P Hogan and P Fitzgerald (0-1 each).

18 July 2026 Round 3	Ferrybank	2-11 - 0-27	Clonea	Páirc de Hindenburg
	M O'Brien 0-7 (5f, 1 65), R Carew 1-2, C Haley 1-0, C Mac Cathmhaoil 0-1, R McGarrity 0-1.	Report	B Power 0-7 (1f), F Roche 0-6 (3f, 1 sideline), K Power 0-4, R Elliffe 0-2, G Power 0-2, P Mackey 0-2, G Hahessy 0-1, T Skehan 0-1, C Dalton 0-1, J Power 0-1.

18 July 2026 Round 3	De La Salle	0-20 - 1-14	Passage	Azzurri Walsh Park
	B Cunningham 0-7, S O'Brien 0-2, S Power 0-2, C Power 0-2, C Dawson 0-2, J Twomey 0-2, J Fagan 0-1, D Lalor 0-1, C Keane 0-1.		T Carey 0-9, L Flynn 1-1, C DRohan 0-1, R Jacob 0-1, S Kelly 0-1, E Power 0-1.

19 July 2026 Round 3	Abbeyside	0-18 - 0-22	Ballygunner A	Cappoquin Logistics Fraher Field
	E Kiely (0-12; 0-9f; 0-1 ‘65); C Treen (0-2); S Callaghan, R Prunty, M Kiely and N Montgomery (0-1 each)	Report	D Hutchinson (0-5; 0-3f); C Sheahan and K Mahony (0-3 each); M Hartley, T Foley, P Fitzgerald and M Mahony (0-2 each); C Power, J Power and A O’Neill (0-1 each)

31 July 2026 Round 4	Ballygunner A	3-33 - 1-13	Ferrybank	Azzurri Walsh Park
	P Fitzgerald (1-13; 1-9f; 0-2 ‘65); K Mahony (2-4); M Hartley (0-4); M Mahony, C Sheahan, T Foley and E O’Brien (0-2 each); A O’Neill, P Hogan, C Power and J Power (0-1 each)	Report	M O’Brien (0-12; 0-8f; 0-1 ‘65; 0-1 sl); R McGarrity (1-1)

1 August 2026 Round 4	Abbeyside	0-26 - 2-18	Passage	Azzurri Walsh Park
	E Kiely 0-9 (6f, 1 '65), S Callaghan 0-6, C Treen 0-5, N Montgomery 0-3, D Walsh 0-2, E McInerney 0-1.	Report	R Jacob 1-2, T Carey 0-5 (1f, 1 '65), S Kelly 0-4, D Cullinane 1-0, M Fitzgerald 0-2, K Cullinane, G Cullinane, E Walsh, L Flynn and M Cummins 0-1 each.

1 August 2026 Round 4	Clonea	2-20 - 4-14	De La Salle	Azzurri Walsh Park
	F Roche 0-6 (3f), B Power 0-6, J Power 1-2, G Power 0-3, T Skehan 1-0, R O'Mahony 0-2, A Murray 0-1.	Report	J Twomey 3-3, B Cunningham 0-3 (3f), C Dawson 0-3, C Keane 1-0, J Dillion, C Morris, S Power, S McNulty and J Fagan 0-1 each.

7 August 2026 Round 5	Ferrybank	1-17 - 2-12	Passage	Azzurri Walsh Park
	M O’Brien (1-8; 1-0 pen; 0-7f); R McGarrity (1-2); C Haley and C Mac Cathmhaoil (0-1 each)	Report	T Carey (0-8; 0-7f); S Kelly (1-2); M Fitzgerald (0-4); L Flynn, R Jacob and J Roche (0-1 each)

8 August 2026 Round 5	Abbeyside	1-15 - 0-25	De La Salle	Azzurri Walsh Park
	E Kiely 1-5, C Treen 0-3, R Walsh 0-3, S Callaghan 0-1, W Beresford 0-1, B Callaghan 0-1.	Report	J Fagan 0-7, J Twomey 0-7, C Dawson 0-7, C Power 0-1, D Lawlor 0-1, C Keane 0-1, C Morris 0-1.

8 August 2026 Round 5	Ballygunner A	3-21 - 0-15	Clonea	Azzurri Walsh Park
	D Hutchinson 0-6, K Mahony 0-4, C Tobin 1-1, G Corbett 1-1, P Fitzgerald 0-3, P Hogan 1-0, E Cuddihy 0-2, Pauric Mahony 0-2, C Power 0-1, C Sheahan 0-1.	Report	B Power 0-4, K Power 0-4, F Roche 0-3, T Skehan 0-2, J Power 0-1, G Power 0-1.

== Group B ==
=== Group B table ===
Quarter-finalists Relegated

Team	Matches				Score			Pts
Team	Pld	W	D	L	For	Against	Diff	Pts
Fourmilewater	5	4	1	0	148	103	45	9
Roanmore	5	4	1	0	124	82	42	9
Mount Sion	5	3	0	2	119	113	6	6
Lismore	5	2	0	3	112	127	-15	4
Ballygunner B	5	0	1	4	98	135	-37	1
Dungarvan	5	0	1	4	90	131	-41	1

=== Group B results ===
4 July 2026 Round 1	Roanmore	3-22 - 1-16	Ballygunner B	Azzurri Walsh Park
	S Burke 0-5, G O'Brien 0-5, E Flynn 1-2, S Roche 1-1, S Mackey 1-0, L Hearne 0-2, C Chester 0-1, B Nolan 0-1, E Burke 0-1, R Furlong 0-1, E O'Toole 0-1, A Furlong 0-1, P O'Sullivan 0-1.		G Corbett 0-5, B O'Keeffe 1-2, T Spain 0-3, C O'Sullivan 0-2, S Fleming 0-2, O Fives 0-2.

5 July 2026 Round 1	Fourmilewater	1-26 - 1-16	Dungarvan	Cappoquin Logistics Fraher Field
	A Ryan 0-11, J Barron 0-5, L O'Brien 0-4, C Ryan 1-0, E Spelman 0-2, B Byrne 0-2, P Walsh 0-1, T Guiry 0-1.		J Burke 1-4, M Kiely 0-3, R McGovern 0-3, A Shanahan 0-2, E Burke 0-2, J Duggan 0-1, D Lyons 0-1.

5 July 2026 Round 1	Lismore	1-21 - 1-26	Mount Sion	Cappoquin Logistics Fraher Field
	J Prendergast 0-7 (5f), B O’Sullivan 1-2, C Lineen 0-3, S Barry 0-2, O O’Gorman, D Prendergast, J Lenihan, B Cummins, J Shanahan, P Prendergast and J O’Keeffe 0-1 each	Report	J Gleeson 0-9 (8f), J Meaney 1-4, MF O’Neill 0-4 (4f), S Roche 0-3, T Kennedy 0-2, G Power, A Kirwan, D Power and J Kennedy 0-1 each

11 July 2026 Round 2	Ballygunner B	0-21 - 0-21	Dungarvan	St Molleran's Park
	G Corbett 0-6, J Foley 0-4, B O'Keeffe 0-2, C O'Sullivan 0-2, R Fitzpatrick 0-1, T Spain 0-1, P Power 0-1, S Fleming 0-1, D O'Keeffe 0-1, C Berry 0-1, J Power 0-1.		R McGovern 0-10, J Burke 0-3, E Burke 0-2, M Kiely 0-2, B Hickey 0-1, A Shanahan 0-1, D Hamilton-Hayes 0-1, J Duggan 0-1.

12 July 2026 Round 2	Roanmore	0-20 - 0-12	Mount Sion	Azzurri Walsh Park
	G O'Brien 0-10, B Nolan 0-1, D Walsh 0-1, L Hearne 0-1, S Roche 0-1, C Chester 0-1, E Flynn 0-1, E Burke 0-1, S Burke 0-1, B Nolan 0-1, S Cooke 0-1.		JGleeson 0-3, T Corcoran 0-3, S Roche 0-2, S O'Neill 0-1, B Penkert 0-1, J Kirwan 0-1, T Kennedy 0-1.

12 July 2026 Round 2	Lismore	0-19 - 5-19	Fourmilewater	Cappoquin Logistics Fraher Field
	J Prendergast 0-9, P Prendergast 0-2, B O'Sullivan 0-2, O O'Gorman 0-2, R Barry 0-1, J O'Keeffe 0-1, H Quann 0-1, K Dunne 0-1.		A Ryan 2-11, S Walsh 2-2, M Morrissey 1-0, J Barron 0-3, E Spelman 0-2, C Ryan 0-1.

18 July 2026 Round 3	Ballygunner B	3-11 - 4-24	Fourmilewater	St Molleran's Park
	B O’Keeffe 0-7 (7 frees); O Fives 2-0; R Fitzpatrick 1-0; J Foley 0-2; S Fleming and P Power 0-1 each.	Report	A Ryan 1-11 (0-3 frees, 0-1 penalty, 0-1 ’65); S Walsh 1-4; E Spellman 1-3; M Morrissey 1-0; O Walsh, P Spellman, J Barron, L O’Brien, C Ryan and B Byrne 0-1 each.

18 July 2026 Round 3	Dungarvan	0-17 - 2-22	Mount Sion	Azzurri Walsh Park
	R McGovern 0-8 (6f), D Lyons 0-2, J Burke 0-2, D Hayes Hamilton 0-1, B Hickey 0-1, B Curran 0-1, P Quann 0-1, L Power 0-1.	Report	M O'Neill 1-3 (0-2f), A Gleeson 0-4, A O'Regan 0-4, J Meaney 1-1, J Gleeson 0-2, J Kirwan 0-2, T Corcoran 0-1, PJ Fannin 0-1, S Roche 0-1, T Kennedy 0-1, MF O'Neill 0-1, B Penkert 0-1.

18 July 2026 Round 3	Roanmore	1-28 - 1-13	Lismore	Cappoquin Logistics Fraher Field
	G O’Brien (0-8; 0-5f; 0-2 ‘65); A Furlong and B Nolan (0-4 each); P O’Sullivan (0-3); E Flynn and L Hearne (0-2 each, 0-1f); R Furlong (1-1); B Nolan, C Chester, D Walsh and S Roche (0-1 each).	Report	J Prendergast (0-7; 0-5f); O O’Gorman (1-1); J Shanahan and B O’Sullivan (0-2 each); J O’Keeffe (0-1).

1 August 2026 Round 4	Mount Sion	0-24 - 1-19	Ballygunner B	Azzurri Walsh Park
	A Gleeson (0-15; 0-14f); S Roche (0-2); MF O’Neill, A Regan, J Kennedy, J Meaney, M O’Neill, B Penkert and T Kennedy (0-1 each)	Report	A Dawson (1-1); B O’Keeffe (0-4; 0-3f); J Foley and G Corbett (0-4 each); C Berry (0-2); C O’Sullivan, R Fitzpatrick, O Fives and C Whitty (0-1 each)

2 August 2026 Round 4	Dungarvan	1-14 - 4-18	Lismore	Cappoquin Logistics Fraher Field
	J Burke (1-2; 0-1f); R McGovern (0-5; 0-5f); D Hayes Hamilton and J Meehan (0-2 each); E Burke, J Duggan and M Kiely (0-1 each)	Report	J Prendergast (0-9; 0-7f); B O’Sullivan (2-1); O O’Gorman (1-1); S Barry (1-0); H Quann (0-3); J O’Keeffe, B Cummins, C Lineen and P Prendergast (0-1 each)

2 August 2026 Round 4	Fourmilewater	1-16 - 1-16	Roanmore	Cappoquin Logistics Fraher Field
	A Ryan 0-8 (6f, 1 '65), E Spellman 0-3, M Morrissey 1-0, T Barron 0-2, J Barron 0-2, S Walsh 0-1.	Report	S Burke 0-5, G O'Brien 0-5 (4f, 1 '65), P O'Sullivan 1-1, E Burke 0-2, S Roche 0-1, B Nolan 0-1, C Carroll 0-1.

9 August 2026 Round 5	Ballygunner B	0-16 - 1-20	Lismore	Pairc Naomh Bríd
	B O'Keeffe 0-5, J Foley 0-4, C Berry 0-3, O Fives 0-2, A DAwson 0-1, S Fleming 0-1.	Report	J Prendergast 0-6, B O'Sullivan 1-2, R Barry 0-3, S Barry 0-2, C Lineen 0-2, C Howard 0-1, T Duffin 0-1, I Daly 0-1, J Shanahan 0-1, H Quann 0-1.

9 August 2026 Round 5	Dungarvan	1-13 - 1-20	Roanmore	Cappoquin Logistics Fraher Field
	R McGovern 1-5, J Lacey 0-1, K Daly 0-1, J Duggan 0-1, E O'Callaghan 0-1, E Burke 0-1, J Burke 0-1, P Quann 0-1, B Hickey 0-1.		S Burke 0-6, L Hearne 1-2, I Chester 0-4, G O'Brien 0-4, S Roche 0-2, Brian Nolan 0-1, Billy Nolan 0-1.

9 August 2026 Round 5	Mount Sion	4-14 - 1-27	Fourmilewater	Cappoquin Logistics Fraher Field
	A Gleeson 1-6, A Regan 2-0, M O'Neill 0-4, MF O'Neill 1-0, J Gleeson 0-1, S Roche 0-1, J Meaney 0-1, T Kennedy 0-1.		A Ryan 0-10, L O'Brien 1-5, E Spellman 0-4, S Walsh 0-3, M Morrissey 0-2, T Guiry 0-1, J Barron 0-1, C Walsh 0-1.

== Relegation stage ==
=== Playoff ===
21 August 2026 Relegation playoff	Clonea	2-21 - 3-16	Dungarvan	Cappoquin Logistics Fraher Field
	F Roche 0-6 (3f), J Power 0-5 (1f), S Curry 1-1, D Flynn 1-0, K Power, M Curry, G Power 0-2, B Power, G Hahessy, C Dalton 0-1 each.	Report	J Burke 1-3, R McGovern 1-3 (3f), E Burke 1-2, (1-1f), D Hamilton Hayes, M Kiely 0-2 each, B Hickey, L Power, B Curran, E O Callaghan 0-1 each.

== Knockout stage ==
=== Quarter-finals ===
15 August 2026 Quarter-final	Ballygunner A	1-19 - 1-11	Lismore	Cappoquin Logistics Fraher Field
	Pauric Mahony (0-6; 6f); R Power (1-1); C Tobin (0-4); D Hutchinson (0-3; 0-2f); M Mahony and E Cuddihy (0-2 each); P Leavey (0-1)	Report	J Prendergast (0-4; 0-3f); B O’Sullivan (1-0); J Shanahan (0-2); H Quann (0-1; 0-1sl); I Daly, J O’Keeffe, P Prendergast and O O’Gorman (0-1 each)

15 August 2026 Quarter-final	Fourmilewater	0-26 - 1-16	Passage	Cappoquin Logistics Fraher Field
	A Ryan (0-14; 0-8f; 0-1 ‘65); S Walsh (0-4); E Spelman (0-3); L O’Brien and T Guiry (0-2 each); M Morrissey (0-1)	Report	T Carey (0-10; 0-8f); R Jacob (1-1); K Cullinane and M Fitzgerald (0-2 each); S Kelly (0-1)

16 August 2026 Quarter-final	Roanmore	2-16 - 0-17	Abbeyside	Azzurri Walsh Park
	G O'Brien 0-6, L Hearne 1-1, E Flynn 1-1, B Nolan 0-3, A Furlong 0-2, B Nolan 0-1, S Roche 0-1, D Walsh 0-1.		E Kiely 0-8, S Callaghan 0-5, C Treen 0-2, N Montgomery 0-1, M O'Halloran 0-1.

16 August 2026 Quarter-final	De La Salle	0-21 - 0-20	Mount Sion	Azzurri Walsh Park
	C Dawson 0-7, J Fagan 0-4, J Twomey 0-3, C Keane 0-2, S Power 0-2, S O'Brien 0-1, C Power 0-1, A Farrell 0-1.		J Gleeson 0-8, M O'Neill 0-3, J Kennedy 0-2, S Roche 0-2, PJ Fanning 0-2, A Gleeson 0-2, A Regan 0-1.

=== Semi-finals ===
22 August 2026 Semi-final	Ballygunner	1-27 - 0-14	De La Salle	Azzurri Walsh Park
	C Tobin 1-5, Pauric Mahony 0-7 (4f), E Cuddihy 0-4 (3f), C Power, K Mahony 0-3 each, M Mahony, M Hartley, T Foley, J Foley, R Power 0-1 each.	Report	J Twomey 0-4 (1 ’65). C Dawson 0-3, A Farrell 0-2, M Costigan, J Fagan, C Keane, S Power, C O’Callaghan 0-1 each.

23 August 2026 Semi-final	Roanmore	0-17 - 2-16	Fourmilewater	Cappoquin Logistics Fraher Field
	G O’Brien (0-12; 0-7f); B Nolan, L Hearne, R Furlong, S Burke and B Nolan (0-1 each)	Report	A Ryan (0-4; 0-3f); J Barron (0-4); T Guiry and L O’Brien (1-0 each); S Walsh and E Spelman (0-3 each); D Ryan and C Ryan (0-1 each)

=== Final ===
30 August 2026 Final	Ballygunner	1-16 - 0-15	Fourmilewater	Azzuri Walsh Park
	Pauric Mahony (0-5, 5 frees); M Hartley (1-0); D Hutchinson, K Mahony (0-3 each); M Mahony, C Tobin (0-2 each); R Power (0-1).	Report	A Ryan (0-8, 4 frees, 1 65); S Walsh 0-2; Dermot Ryan, T Barron, J Barron, L O’Brien, M Morrissey (0-1 each).	Referee: S Walsh (De La Salle)

== Championship statistics ==
=== Top scorers ===
Rank	Player	Club	Tally	Total	Matches	Average
1	Aaron Ryan	Fourmilewater	3-77	86	8	10.75
2	Mark O'Brien	Ferrybank	1-51	54	5	10.80
3	Gavin O'Brien	Roanmore	0-50	50	7	7.14
4	Thomas Carey	Passage	0-47	47	6	7.83
5	Eoin Kiely	Abbeyside	1-43	46	6	7.66
6	Jack Prendergast	Lismore	0-42	42	6	7.00
7	Ryan McGovern	Dungarvan	2-34	40	6	6.66
8	Jack Twomey	De La Salle	3-28	37	7	5.28
8	Dessie Hutchinson	Ballygunner	1-34	37	6	6.16
10	Cormac Dawson	De La Salle	0-36	36	6	6.00
10	Francis Roche	Clonea	0-36	36	6	6.00
