= 1969 Waterford Senior Hurling Championship =

Annual hurling competition season

- Champions: Mount Sion (21st title); Mick Foley (captain)
- Runners-up: Abbeyside

The 1969 Waterford Senior Hurling Championship was the 69th staging of the Waterford Senior Hurling Championship since its establishment by the Waterford County Board in 1897.

Ballygunner were the defending champions.

On 19 October 1969, Mount Sion won the championship after a 7–11 to 2–13 defeat of Abbeyside in the final. This was their 21st championship title overall and their first title since 1965.

== Results ==
=== Semi-finals ===
14 September 1969 Semi-final	Mount Sion	2-11 - 2-06	De La Salle	Walsh Park

21 September 1969 Semi-final	Abbeyside	3-17 - 3-04	Ballygunner	Fraher Field

=== Final ===
19 October 1969 Final	Mount Sion	7-11 - 2-13	Abbeyside	Walsh Park
