= Anthony Kirwan (hurler) =

Irish hurler

Personal information
- Native name: Antoine Ó Ciarubháin (Irish)
- Born: 7 March 1974 (age 52) Portlaw, County Waterford, Ireland
- Height: 5 ft 10 in (178 cm)

Sport
- Sport: Hurling
- Position: Full-forward
Clubs
- Years: Club
- Portlaw; Mount Sion
Club titles
- Waterford titles: 6
- Munster titles: 1
Inter-county
Years	County	Apps (scores)
1990s-1998	Waterford	9 (2-7)
Inter-county titles
- Munster titles: 0
- All-Irelands: 0
- All Stars: 0

Anthony Kirwan (born 7 March 1974) is an Irish hurler who presently plays with Mount Sion GAA at club level and formerly with Waterford GAA at inter-county level.

== Honours ==
- Munster Minor Hurling Championship winner - 1992
- Waterford Senior Hurling Championship winner - 1994, 1998, 2000, 2002, 2003, 2004 and 2006.
- Waterford Minor Hurling Championship winner - 1991

== Championship Appearances ==
#	Date	Venue	Opponent	Score	Result	Competition	Match report
1	24 May 1998	Austin Stack Park, Tralee	Kerry	0-1	0-20 : 1-09	Munster Quarter-Final	Irish Independent
2	7 June 1998	Páirc Uí Chaoimh, Cork	Tipperary	0-1	0-21 : 2-12	Munster Semi-Final	Irish Independent
3	12 July 1998	Semple Stadium, Thurles	Clare	2-1	3-10 : 1-16	Munster Final	Irish Independent
4	19 July 1998	Semple Stadium, Thurles	Clare	0-1	0-10 : 2-16	Munster Final Replay	Irish Independent
5	26 July 1998	Croke Park, Dublin	Galway	0-2	1-20 : 1-10	All-Ireland Quarter-Final	Irish Independent
6	16 August 1998	Croke Park, Dublin	Kilkenny	0-1	1-10 : 1-11	All-Ireland Semi-Final	Irish Independent
7	30 May 1999	Semple Stadium, Thurles	Limerick	0-0	1-16 : 1-15	Munster Quarter-Final	Irish Examiner
8	28 May 2000	Páirc Uí Chaoimh, Cork	Tipperary	0-0	0-14 : 0-17	Munster Quarter-Final	Irish Independent
9	10 June 2001	Páirc Uí Chaoimh, Cork	Limerick	0-0	2-14 : 4-11	Munster Semi-Final	Irish Independent
