= 1999 All-Ireland Junior Football Championship =

Gaelic football tournament held in 1996

All Ireland Champions
- Winners: Waterford (1st win)
- Captain: Alfie Kirwan

All Ireland Runners-up
- Runners-up: Meath
- Captain: Enda Grogan

Provincial Champions
- Munster: Waterford
- Leinster: Meath
- Ulster: Not Played
- Connacht: Roscommon

The 1999 All-Ireland Junior Hurling Championship was the 69th staging of the All-Ireland Junior Championship, the Gaelic Athletic Association's second tier Gaelic football championship.

Tipperary entered the championship as the defending champions, however, they were beaten by Kerry in the Munster quarter-final.

The All-Ireland final was played on 7 August 1999 at O'Moore Park in Portlaoise, between Waterford and Meath, in what was their first ever meeting in the final. Waterford won the match by 2–12 to 2–11 to claim their first ever championship title.

== All-Ireland Junior Football Championship ==
=== All-Ireland semi-finals ===
24 July 1996 Semi-final	Warwickshire	0-06 - 6-20	Meath	Páirc na hÉireann

24 July 1999 Semi-final	Waterford	2-11 - 1-09	Roscommon	O'Moore Park

=== All-Ireland final ===
7 August 1999 Final	Waterford	2-12 - 2-11	Meath	O'Moore Park
	C Power 1-4, P Ferncombe 1-4, P Queally 0-1, D Whelan 0-1, S Bergin 0-1, D Ryan 0-1.		M Crampton 1-3, J Carey 0-6, P Nestor 1-0, F McMahon 0-2.	Referee: H Beirne (Roscommon)
