= Derek McGrath (hurler) =

Irish hurler & manager (born 1976)

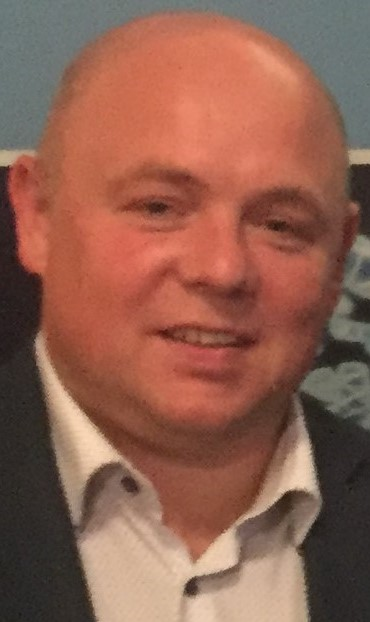

Personal information
- Native name: Derek Mac Craith (Irish)
- Born: 30 May 1976 (age 50) Waterford, Ireland
- Occupation: Secondary school teacher
- Height: 5 ft 6 in (168 cm)

Sport
- Sport: Hurling
- Position: Centre-forward
Clubs
- Years: Club
- St. Saviour's; De La Salle
Club titles
- Waterford titles: 1
- Munster titles: 1
Inter-county*
Years	County	Apps (scores)
1996-1998	Waterford	1 (0-00)
Inter-county titles
- Munster titles: 0
- All-Irelands: 0
- NHL: 0
- All Stars: 0
- *Inter County team apps and scores correct as of 20:25, 24 October 2013.

Derek McGrath (born 30 May 1976) is an Irish retired hurler who played as a centre-forward for the Waterford senior team. He is a former manager of the Waterford senior team.

Born in Waterford, McGrath first played competitive hurling during his schooldays. He arrived on the inter-county scene at the age of sixteen when he first linked up with the Waterford minor team, before later lining out with the under-21 side. He joined the senior panel for the 1996 championship, and was a seldom used player until he left inter-county hurling after the 1998 championship.

At club level McGrath is a Munster medallist with De La Salle. He also won one championship medal.

In retirement from playing, McGrath became involved in team management and coaching. After guiding De La Salle College to Harty Cup and Croke Cup successes, he managed the De La Salle club to championship success before taking over as Waterford manager.

== Playing career ==
=== Club ===
In 2008 McGrath was a member of the extended panel of the De La Salle team that reached the county championship decider. He was introduced as a substitute in the final, as De La Salle claimed a 3–13 to 1–11 defeat of Ballygunner. It was his first championship medal. McGrath later added a Munster medal to his collection following a 0–9 to 0–8 defeat of Thurles Sarsfield's.

=== Inter-County ===
McGrath first came to prominence on the inter-county scene as a member of the Waterford minor hurling team in 1992. He won a Munster medal that year following an exciting two-game saga with provincial kingpins Tipperary. Waterford later qualified for the All-Ireland final, however, Galway were far superior on the day and had an easy 1–13 to 2–4 victory.

A three-year spell with the Waterford minor team, was followed by an unsuccessful few years with the under-21 side.

McGrath joined the Waterford senior hurling team in 1996 and lined out in a number of National Hurling League games and one championship game until he left the panel after 1998.

== Managerial career ==
=== De La Salle College ===
McGrath first enjoyed success as coach of the De La Salle College team. In 2007 he guided them to a very first Harty Cup crown following a 2–7 to 0–11 defeat of kingpins St. Flannan's College. What was more remarkable about the victory was that Stephen Power scored De La Salle's entire tally. McGrath's side later claimed the All-Ireland following a narrow 0–13 to 1–9 victory over Kilkenny CBS.

In 2008 McGrath was in charge of the De La Salle College side that set out to defend their provincial and All-Ireland crowns. A 1–11 to 0-7 trouncing of Thurles CBS gave De La Salle College a second successive Harty Cup title. Both sides met again in the subsequent All-Ireland decider, however, a draw was the result on that occasion. The replay was also a close affair with McGrath's De La Salle College claiming a narrow 2–9 to 2–8 victory.

=== De La Salle ===
As his club career was coming to an end, McGrath took charge of the De La Salle senior hurling team. 2012 proved a successful year as De La Salle trounced Dungarvan by 1–21 to 0–12 in the championship decider.

=== Waterford ===
On 23 October 2013, McGrath was appointed manager of the Waterford senior hurling team. On 3 May 2015, Waterford won their first league title since 2007 after a 1–24 to 0–17 win against Cork in the final after an unbeaten campaign. On 7 June 2015, Waterford again defeated Cork by 3–19 to 1–21 in the semi-final of the 2015 Munster Championship. In the 2015 Munster Final, Waterford lost to Tipperary on a 0–16 to 0–21 scoreline. Waterford went on to defeat Dublin in the quarter-final of the All-Ireland Championship by 2–21 to 1–19, before losing in the semi-final to Kilkenny on 9 August by 0–18 to 1-21. In September 2015, McGrath was given a three-year extension as Waterford manager. In August 2017, Waterford qualified for the 2017 All-Ireland Senior Hurling Championship Final after a 4–19 to 0–20 win against Cork. In the final on 3 September, Galway won by 0–26 to 2–17.

In November 2017, McGrath confirmed that he would remain in charge for 2018.

In June 2018, McGrath announced that he would be stepping down as manager of the Waterford team.

== Career statistics ==
=== As a manager ===
Managerial league-championship record by team and tenure
Team	From	To	Record				
Team	From	To	P	W	D	L	Win %
Waterford	23 October 2013	18 June 2018	58	28	6	24	48.3

== Honours ==
=== Player ===
De La Salle

- Munster Senior Club Hurling Championship (1): 2010
- Waterford Senior Hurling Championship (1): 2010

Waterford

- Munster Minor Hurling Championship (1): 1992

=== Manager ===
De La Salle College

- All-Ireland Senior Colleges' Hurling Championship (2): 2007, 2008
- Dr Harty Cup (2): 2007, 2008

De La Salle

- Waterford Senior Hurling Championship (1): 2012

Waterford

- National Hurling League (1): 2015

== Personal life ==
Derek McGrath is married to Sarah (sister of Waterford Hurler John Mullane), they have two sons Fionn (15) and Oran(6) Derek is a secondary school teacher in De la Salle as well as being their hurling manager.

Sporting positions
Preceded by Michael Ryan	Waterford Senior Hurling Manager; 2013–2018	Succeeded by Páraic Fanning
