= Páraic Fanning =

Irish hurling player and manager

Personal information
- Native name: Páraic Ó Fainín (Irish)
- Born: 1970 (age 55–56) Waterford, Ireland
- Occupation: Business development manager

Sport
- Sport: Hurling
- Position: Left corner-forward
Club
- Years: Club
- Mount Sion
Club titles
- Waterford titles: 5
- Munster titles: 1
College
- Years: College
- 1988-1992: Waterford Regional Technical College
College titles
- Fitzgibbon titles: 1
Inter-county*
Years	County	Apps (scores)
1991-1995	Waterford	1 (0-00)
Inter-county titles
- Munster titles: 0
- All-Irelands: 0
- NHL: 0
- All Stars: 0
- *Inter County team apps and scores correct as of 19:20, 18 September 2018.

Páraic Fanning (born 1970) is an Irish hurling manager and former player who served as the manager of the Waterford senior hurling team for the 2019 season.

== Management and coaching career ==
=== Mount Sion ===
In January 2005, Fanning succeeded Jim Greene as manager of the Mount Sion senior hurling team. On 23 October 2006, he guided Mount Sion to the Waterford Championship title after a 2-13 to 0-12 defeat of Ballygunner in the final.

=== James Stephens ===
As manager of the James Stephens senior hurling team in Kilkenny, Fanning guided the club to the final of the Kilkenny Championship on 26 October 2008. James Stephens were defeated by Ballyhale Shamrocks on a scoreline of 2-11 to 0-12 on that occasion.

=== Waterford ===
On 9 November 2009, Fanning joined the Waterford senior hurling management team as a selector under Davy Fitzgerald. In his first season in the role, he helped guide Waterford to a Munster final defeat of Cork after a replay. In September 2011, Fanning declined to put his name forward for the vacant managers' position after the resignation of Fitzgerald.

=== Wexford ===
In November 2016, Fanning joined the Wexford senior hurling management team under Davy Fitzgerald as a selector. During his first year as a selector, Fanning helped secure promotion to Division 1A of the National Hurling League. Later that season he helped guide Wexford to their first Leinster Championship defeat of Kilkenny since 2004 as well as a first Leinster final appearance since 2008.

=== Waterford ===
On 17 September 2018, Fanning was appointed to succeed Derek McGrath as manager of the Waterford senior hurling team. He was joined on the management team by James Murray and Patrick Kearney who acted as selectors. On 2 August 2019, it was announced that Fanning would be stepping down as Waterford manager after one year in charge.

== Career statistics ==
Team	Year	National League			Munster		All-Ireland		Total	
Team	Year	Division	Apps	Score	Apps	Score	Apps	Score	Apps	Score
Waterford	1991-92	Division 1B	2	0-00	0	0-00	—		2	0-00
Waterford	1992-93	Division 1B	3	0-00	0	0-00	—		3	0-00
Waterford	1993-94	Division 1	3	0-00	1	0-00	—		4	0-00

== Honours ==
=== Player ===
Waterford Regional Technical College

- Fitzgibbon Cup (1): 1992

Mount Sion

- Munster Senior Club Hurling Championship (1): 2002
- Waterford Senior Hurling Championship (5): 1988, 1994, 1998, 2000, 2002

Waterford

- National Hurling League Division 2 (1): 1994-95

=== Management ===
Waterford Regional Technical College

- Fitzgibbon Cup (1): 1995

Mount Sion

- Waterford Senior Hurling Championship (1): 2006

Waterford

- Munster Senior Hurling Championship (1): 2010

Sporting positions
Preceded by Derek McGrath	Waterford Senior hurling Manager; 2018–2019	Succeeded by Liam Cahill
Achievements
Preceded by Pat Heffernan	Fitzgibbon Cup Final winning captain 1992	Succeeded by Jim Byrne
