= Waterford Senior Hurling Championship =

- Current season or competition: 2026 Waterford Senior Hurling Championship
- Code: Hurling
- Founded: 1897; 129 years ago
- Region: Waterford (GAA)
- No. of teams: 12
- Title holders: Ballygunner (25th title)
- Most titles: Mount Sion (35 titles)
- Sponsors: JJ Kavanagh & Sons
- TV partner: TG4 (final only)
- Official website: https://www.waterfordgaa.ie/

The Waterford Senior Hurling Championship (known for sponsorship reasons as the JJ Kavanagh & Sons Senior Hurling Championship) is an annual hurling competition organised by the Waterford County Board of the Gaelic Athletic Association since 1897 for the top hurling teams in the county of Waterford in Ireland.

The series of games are played during the spring, summer and autumn months with the county final currently being played at Walsh Park in October. Initially played as a knock-out competition, the championship currently features a group stage followed by a knock-out stage. The Waterford County Championship is an integral part of the wider Munster Senior Club Hurling Championship. The winners of the Waterford county final join the champions of the other hurling counties to contest the provincial championship. Twelve teams currently participate in the Waterford County Championship. The title has been won at least once by 23 different teams. The all-time record-holders are Mount Sion, who have won a total of 35 titles. Ballygunner are the title-holders after defeating Fourmilewater by 1–16 to 0–15 in the 2026 championship final.

== Format ==
=== Current format ===
Group stage: The 12 teams are divided into two groups of six. Each team plays each other once. The top four teams in each group advance to the quarter final stage

Relegation play-off: In 2027 the Senior Championship is reduced to 10 teams. Thus, 3 teams are relegated to the Waterford Premier Intermediate Hurling Championship in 2026.

Quarter-finals: 8 teams contest this round. The 4 winning teams advance to the Semi-finals. The 4 losing teams are eliminated from the championship.

Semi-finals: 4 teams contest this round. The 2 winning teams advance to the Semi-finals. The 2 losing teams are eliminated from the championship.

Final: The final is contested by the two semi-final winners.

== Teams ==
=== 2026 teams ===
The following 12 teams contested the 2026 Waterford Senior Hurling Championship:

Team	Location	Colours	Division	Position in 2026	In championship since	Championship titles	Last championship title
Abbeyside	Abbeyside	Blue and orange	West	Quarter-finals	2004	0	—
Ballygunner A	Ballygunner	Red and black	East	Champions	?	25	2026
Ballygunner B	Ballygunner	Red and black	East	Relegated	2026	25	2026
Clonea	Rathgormack	Red and green	East	Relegation final	2019	5	1952
De La Salle	Waterford	Red and white	East	Semi-finals	?	3	2012
Dungarvan	Dungarvan	Blue and white	West	Relegated	2010	6	1941
Ferrybank	Ferrybank	Green and white	East	Relegated	2024	3	1919
Fourmilewater	Ballymacarbry	Blue and white	West	Runners-up	2002	0	—
Lismore	Lismore	Yellow and black	West	Quarter-finals	2017	3	1993
Mount Sion	Waterford	Blue and white	East	Quarter-finals	?	35	2006
Passage	Passage East	Red and white	East	Quarter-finals	?	1	2013
Roanmore	Waterford	Blue and white	East	Semi-finals	2011	2	1990

== Qualification for subsequent competitions ==
The Waterford Senior Hurling Championship winners qualify for the subsequent Munster Senior Club Hurling Championship.

== Managers ==
Managers in the Waterford Championship are involved in the day-to-day running of the team, including the training, team selection, and sourcing of players. Their influence varies from club-to-club and is related to the individual club committees. The manager is assisted by a team of two or three selectors and a backroom team consisting of various coaches.

Winning managers (1999–present)
Manager	Team	Wins	Winning years
Darragh O'Sullivan	Ballygunner	6	2019 (j), 2020 (j), 2021, 2022, 2023, 2024
Jim Greene	Mount Sion	3	2002, 2003, 2004
Fergal Hartley	Ballygunner	3	2014, 2017, 2018
Denis Walsh	Ballygunner	2	2015, 2016
David Franks	Ballygunner	2	2019 (j), 2020 (j)
Jason Ryan	Ballygunner	2	2025, 2026
Michael Gaffney	Ballygunner	1	1999
Kevin Ryan	Mount Sion	1	2000
Gordon Ryan	Ballygunner	1	2001
John Fitzpatrick	Ballygunner	1	2005
Páraic Fanning	Mount Sion	1	2006
Morris Geary	Ballyduff Upper	1	2007
Owen Dunphy	De La Salle	1	2008
Ger Cunningham	Ballygunner	1	2009
Michael Ryan	De La Salle	1	2010
Niall O'Donnell	Ballygunner	1	2011
Derek McGrath	De La Salle	1	2012
Peter Queally	Passage	1	2013

== List of finals ==
=== Legend ===
- Gold – Munster senior club champions
- Silver – Munster senior club runners-up

=== List of Waterford SHC finals ===
Year	Winners		Runners-up	
Year	Club	Score	Club	Score
2026	Ballygunner	1-16	Fourmilewater	0-15
2025	Ballygunner	2–35	Mount Sion	1–16
2024	Ballygunner	2-28	Abbeyside	2-10
2023	Ballygunner	2-26	De La Salle	0-21
2022	Ballygunner	2-11	Mount Sion	0-08
2021	Ballygunner	2-27	Roanmore	0-13
2020	Ballygunner	1-23	Passage	0-09
2019	Ballygunner	1-24	De La Salle	1-15
2018	Ballygunner	2-19	Abbeyside	0-13
2017	Ballygunner	2-18	De La Salle	0-16
2016	Ballygunner	4-20	Passage	1-12
2015	Ballygunner	0-16	Tallow	0-12
2014	Ballygunner	2-16	Mount Sion	0-09
2013	Passage	3-16	Ballygunner	3-13
2012	De La Salle	1-21	Dungarvan	0-12
2011	Ballygunner	1-19	Tallow	0-06
2010	De La Salle	3-13	Ballygunner	1-11
2009	Ballygunner	(4-12) 1-17	Lismore	(2-18) 0-19
2008	De La Salle	0-11	Abbeyside	0-09
2007	Ballyduff Upper	1-18	Ballygunner	1-14
2006	Mount Sion	2-13	Ballygunner	0-12
2005	Ballygunner	2-10	De La Salle	1-12
2004	Mount Sion	4-14	Ballygunner	4-07
2003	Mount Sion	1-14	Ballygunner	1-10
2002	Mount Sion	1-19	Ballygunner	2-14
2001	Ballygunner	4-12	Lismore	1-16
2000	Mount Sion	1-20	Ballygunner	0-09
1999	Ballygunner	1-18	Mount Sion	2-10
1998	Mount Sion	3-19	Ballyduff Upper	0-10
1997	Ballygunner	2-17	Passage	1-14
1996	Ballygunner	3-13	Lismore	1-12
1995	Ballygunner	(1-08) 3-13 (R)	Mount Sion	(1-08) 1-17 (R)
1994	Mount Sion	2-13	Passage	1-11
1993	Lismore	0-08	Passage	0-07
1992	Ballygunner	1-12	Mount Sion	2-07
1991	Lismore	5-07	Mount Sion	1-05
1990	Roanmore	3-13	Ballyduff Upper	2-06
1989	Roanmore	3-08	Ballyduff Upper	2-07
1988	Mount Sion	2-15	Ballygunner	3-08
1987	Ballyduff Upper	4-07	Roanmore	2-11
1986	Mount Sion	0-16	Lismore	0-10
1985	Tallow	3-08	Ballyduff Upper	2-08
1984	Tallow	2-12	Portlaw	2-01
1983	Mount Sion	5-11	Ballyduff Upper	2-06
1982	Ballyduff Upper	0-20	Dunhill	1-11
1981	Mount Sion	4-13	Dunhill	1-14
1980	Tallow	1-07	Dunhill	1-06
1979	Dunhill	2-17	Ballyduff Upper	2-08
1978	Dunhill	2-16	Mount Sion	4-08
1977	Portlaw	4-10	Ballyduff Upper	2-10
1976	Portlaw	7-12	Tallow	1-05
1975	Mount Sion	6-04	Portlaw	2-07
1974	Mount Sion	3-08	Portlaw	2-10
1973	Portlaw	2-11	Mount Sion	2-07
1972	Mount Sion	2-10	Dunhill	2-08
1971	Portlaw	1-13	St. Mollerans	2-08
1970	Ballyduff Lower/Portlaw (awarded title)			
1969	Mount Sion	7-11	Abbeyside	2-13
1968	Ballygunner	2-10	Mount Sion	3-02
1967	Ballygunner	2-10	Ballyduff Lower/Portlaw	3-05
1966	Ballygunner	2-06	Mount Sion	2-03
1965	Mount Sion	3-02	Ballygunner	2-04
1964	Mount Sion	3-06	Abbeyside	1-06
1963	Mount Sion	4-06	Ballygunner	3-04
1962	Erin's Own	5-07	Mount Sion	1-04
1961	Mount Sion	2-14	Erin's Own	2-04
1960	Mount Sion	5-09	Erin's Own	2-05
1959	Mount Sion	5-05	Erin's Own	5-04
1958	Mount Sion	6-10	Faughs	1-08
1957	Mount Sion	2-10	Abbeyside	1-02
1956	Mount Sion	7-07	Cappoquin	2-06
1955	Mount Sion	2-10	Abbeyside	3-04
1954	Mount Sion	3-14	Erin's Own	5-02
1953	Mount Sion	7-11	Tourin	1-01
1952	Clonea	1-10	T. F. Meaghers	2-01
1951	Mount Sion	7-08	Dungarvan	0-09
1950	Tourin	3-07	Mount Sion	2-05
1949	Mount Sion	4-08	Clonea	0-06
1948	Mount Sion	4-08	Avonmore	0-08
1947	Erin's Own	3-04	Clonea	3-01
1946	Erin's Own	5-07	Brickey Rangers	2-04
1945	Mount Sion	3-08	Dungarvan	2-05
1944	3rd Battalion	4-03	Portlaw	2-07
1943	Mount Sion	3-08	Tallow	1-05
1942	Erin's Own	2-05	Lismore	2-03
1941	Dungarvan	2-06	Mount Sion	1-05
1940	Mount Sion	6-05	Dungarvan	3-02
1939	Mount Sion	2-04	Erin's Own	2-02
1938	Mount Sion	4-03	Erin's Own	3-04
1937	Portlaw	3-01	Dungarvan	0-03
1936	Mount Sion	2-06	Tallow	1-05 (Tallow won on objection)
1935	Erin's Own	4-07	Tallow	2-04
1934	Erin's Own	6-04	Tallow	0-02
1933	Erin's Own	7-06	Dunhill	1-03
1932	Erin's Own	2-02	Tallow	0-02
1931	Erin's Own	4-07	Tallow	0-03
1930	Erin's Own	6-04	Dungarvan	0-01
1929	Erin's Own	10-04	Lismore	1-01
1928	Erin's Own	5-06	Tallow	2-00
1927	Erin's Own	8-02	Dungarvan	0-05
1926	Dungarvan	5-02	Lismore	2-03
1925	Lismore	4-02	Erin's Own	2-03
1924	T. F. Meaghers	11-05	Dungarvan	1-02
1923	Dungarvan			
1922	T. F. Meaghers			
1921	No Championship			
1920	Dungarvan	9-02	Ferrybank	1-00
1919	Ferrybank			
1918	Clonea	4-03	Ferrybank	2-01
1917	Dungarvan			
1916	Young Irelands	6-02	Ferrybank	2-00
1915	Ferrybank			
1914	St Stephens De La Salle			
1913	St Stephens De La Salle	5-04	Ballyduff Upper	0-02
1912	T. F. Meagher's	4-02	Clonea	1-00
1911	T. F. Meaghers			
1910	T. F. Meaghers	4-04	Dungarvan	1-02
1909	T. F. Meaghers			
1908	Dungarvan	14 Points	Dunhill	1 Goal
1907	Clonea			
1906	De La Salle	5-05	Ballyduff Lower	0-05
1905	Clonea	6-10	Ballyduff Upper	3-05
1904	Gracedieu		Clonea	
1903	Clonea		De La Salle	
1902	Clonea		Shanacool Durrow	
1901				
1900				
1899	Ballydurn		Blackwater Ramblers	
1898				
1897	Ballytruckle			

== Roll of honour ==
#	Club	Titles	Championships won
1	Mount Sion	35	1938, 1939, 1940, 1943, 1945, 1948, 1949, 1951, 1953, 1954, 1955, 1956, 1957, 1958, 1959, 1960, 1961, 1963, 1964, 1965, 1969, 1972, 1974, 1975, 1981, 1983, 1986, 1988, 1994, 1998, 2000, 2002, 2003, 2004, 2006
2	Ballygunner	25	1966, 1967, 1968, 1992, 1995, 1996, 1997, 1999, 2001, 2005, 2009, 2011, 2014, 2015, 2016, 2017, 2018, 2019, 2020, 2021, 2022, 2023, 2024, 2025, 2026
3	Erin's Own	13	1927, 1928, 1929, 1930, 1931, 1932, 1933, 1934, 1935, 1942, 1946, 1947,1962
4	T.F. Meaghers	6	1909, 1910, 1911, 1912, 1922, 1924
4	Dungarvan	6	1908, 1917, 1920, 1923, 1926, 1941
6	Portlaw	5	1937, 1971, 1973, 1976, 1977
7	Clonea	5	1902, 1903, 1905, 1907, 1952
8	Tallow	4	1936, 1980, 1984, 1985
9	Ferrybank	3	1915, 1916, 1919
9	Lismore	3	1925, 1991, 1993
9	Ballyduff Upper	3	1983, 1987, 2007
9	De La Salle	3	2008, 2010, 2012
13	St Stephens De La Salle	2	1913, 1914
13	Ballyduff Lower	2	1906, 1970 (awarded title)
13	Dunhill	2	1978, 1979
13	Roanmore	2	1989, 1990
17	Ballytruckle	1	1897
17	Ballydurn	1	1899
17	Gracedieu	1	1904
17	Young Irelands	1	1918
17	3rd Battalion	1	1944
17	Tourin	1	1950
17	Passage	1	2013

== Records and statistics ==
=== Teams ===
==== By decade ====
The most successful team of each decade, judged by number of Waterford Senior Hurling Championship titles, is as follows:

- 1890s: 1 each for Ballytruckle (1897) and Ballydurn (1899)
- 1900s: 4 for Clonea (1902-03-05-07)
- 1910s: 3 each for T. F. Meaghers (1910-11-12) and Ferrybank (1915-16-19)
- 1920s: 3 each for Dungarvan (1920-23-26) and Erin's Own (1927-28-29)
- 1930s: 6 for Erin's Own (1930-31-32-33-34-35)
- 1940s: 5 for Mount Sion (1940-43-45-48-49)
- 1950s: 8 for Mount Sion (1951-53-54-55-56-57-58-59)
- 1960s: 6 for Mount Sion (1960-61-63-64-65-69)
- 1970s: 5 for Portlaw (1970-71-73-76-77)
- 1980s: 4 for Mount Sion (1981-83-86-88)
- 1990s: 5 for Ballygunner (1992-95-96-97-99)
- 2000s: 5 for Mount Sion (2000-02-03-04-06)
- 2010s: 7 for Ballygunner (2011-14-15-16-17-18-19)
- 2020s: 7 for Ballygunner (2020-21-22-23-24-25-26)

==== Gaps ====
Top five longest gaps between successive championship titles:

- 66 years: Lismore (1925-1991)
- 45 years: Clonea (1907-1952)
- 44 years: Tallow (1936-1980)
- 33 years: Portlaw (1937-1970)
- 20 years: Ballyduff Upper (1987-2007)

=== Top scorers ===
==== In finals ====
Final	Top scorer	Team	Score	Total
1995	Liam Whitty	Ballygunner	1-05	8
1996	Michael Mahoney	Ballygunner	2-04	10
1997	Paul Flynn	Ballygunner	1-08	11
1998	Ken McGrath	Mount Sion	1-04	7
1999	Paul Flynn	Ballygunner	1-08	11
2000	Tony Browne	Mount Sion	1-07	7
2001	Dave Bennett	Lismore	0-10	10
2002	Ken McGrath	Mount Sion	0-11	11
2003	Paul Flynn	Ballygunner	0-06	6
2004	Ken McGrath	Mount Sion	1-03	6
2005	James Quirke	De La Salle	0-09	9
2006	Ken McGrath	Mount Sion	0-07	7
2007	Stephen Power	Ballygunner	1-06	9
2007	Brendan Hannon	Ballyduff Upper	0-09	9
2008	Páidí Nevin	De La Salle	0-03	3
2008	James Quirke	De La Salle	0-03	3
2009	Paul Flynn	Ballygunner	1-09	12
2010	John Mullane	De La Salle	0-09	9
2011	Pauric Mahony	Ballygunner	0-11	11
2012	Cormac Curran	Dungarvan	0-09	9
2013	Pauric Mahony	Ballygunner	1-07	10
2013	Owen Connors	Passage	1-07	10
2014	Pauric Mahony	Ballygunner	0-10	10
2015	Ryan Grey	Tallow	0-10	10
2016	Pauric Mahony	Ballygunner	1-11	14
2017	Pauric Mahony	Ballygunner	0-09	9
2018	Pauric Mahony	Ballygunner	0-13	13
2019	Pauric Mahony	Ballygunner	0-12	12
2020	Pauric Mahony	Ballygunner	0-08	8
2021	Dessie Hutchinson	Ballygunner	1-09	12
2022	Pauric Mahony	Ballygunner	1-04	7
2023	Reuben Halloran	De La Salle	0-12	12
2024	Pauric Mahony	Ballygunner	0-11	11
2025	Pauric Mahony	Ballygunner	0-11	11
2026	Aaron Ryan	Fourmilewater	0-08	8

== See also ==
- Waterford Premier Intermediate Hurling Championship (Tier 2)
- Waterford Intermediate Hurling Championship (Tier 3)
- Waterford Junior A Hurling Championship (Tier 4)
- Waterford Junior B Hurling Championship (Tier 5)
- Waterford Junior C Hurling Championship (Tier 6)
