= Ware (surname) =

Ware is a surname. The surname likely originates from people who lived or were employed around weirs such as Ware in Hertfordshire, England but could also be from "Waer" a nickname. Notable people with the surname include:

- Amy Robbins Ware, American author, world court worker
- Andre Ware, American football quarterback
- Anna Ware Poole, American composer
- Arthur Wellington Ware CMG (1861 – 29 January 1927), Mayor of Adelaide, South Australia, 1898–1901
- Bruce A. Ware, American theological academic
- Charles Eliot Ware (1814–1887), American physician
- Charles Pickard Ware (1849–1921), American educator and folk music transcriber
- Charles R. Ware, American naval officer
- Charlie Ware (1900-1984), Irish hurler
- Charlie Ware (1933-2013), Irish hurler
- Caroline F. Ware (1899–1990), American historian and social scientist
- Chris Ware, American cartoonist
- Christopher Lee Ware, Male fashionista, scarf designer, creator of EAD
- David S. Ware, American jazz saxophonist
- DeMarcus Ware, American football player
- Edmund Ware (sculptor) (1883-1960), British sculptor and teacher
- Fabian Ware, founder of British Imperial War Graves Commission
- George Ware, American dendrologist
- Harold Ware, American communist
- Henry Ware (disambiguation), multiple people
- Herta Ware, American actress and activist
- Isaac Ware (1704-1766), English architect and translator of Italian Renaissance architect Andrea Palladio
- James Ware (disambiguation), multiple people
- Jeff Ware (disambiguation), multiple people
- Jeremy Ware, Canadian baseball player
- Jessie Ware (born 1984), British singer
- John Ware (disambiguation), multiple people
- John Ware (cowboy), American-Canadian cowboy
- John Ware (physician) (1795–1864), American physician and professor of medicine
- John H. Ware, III, a US Representative from Pennsylvania
- Jylan Ware (born 1993), American football player
- Kallistos Ware (1934–2022), Metropolitan of Diokleia in Phrygia, an Orthodox assistant bishop in the UK
- Keith L. Ware, U.S. Army Major General killed in Vietnam
- Kel'el Ware (born 2004), American basketball player
- Kevin Ware (born 1993), American basketball player
- Lancelot Ware, British barrister and MENSA founder
- Leon Ware (1940–2017), American soul musician
- Marilyn Ware (1943-2017), American diplomat
- Martha Ware (1917-2009), American jurist and politician
- Martyn Ware, British electronic musician
- Mary Lee Ware (1858–1937), American philanthropist
- Mary Ware (writer) (1828 –1915), poet, prose writer
- Matt Ware, American football player
- Michael Ware, Australian journalist
- Mike Ware (ice hockey), Canadian ice hockey player
- Mike Ware (photographer), chemist and alternative-process photographer
- Nicholas Ware, American politician
- Opoku Ware I, Ashanti King
- Opoku Ware II, Ashanti King
- Onzlee Ware, American politician from Virginia
- Paul Ware, English footballer
- Rick Ware, American racing driver
- Riley Ware, American football player
- Rosie Ware (born 1959), Torres Strait Islander textile designer and printmaker
- Scott Ware, American football player
- Sidney William Ware, Scottish soldier
- Spencer Ware (born 1991), American football player
- Taylor Ware, American singer and yodeler
- Teyon Ware, American amateur wrestler
- Theron Ware, fictional character from The Damnation of Theron Ware
- Tim Ware, American musician
- Tom Mauchahty-Ware, Native American musician
- Tommy Ware (1885–1915), English footballer
- Wallace Ware, a pseudonym used by novelist and screenwriter David Karp
- Wilbur Ware, American jazz bassist
- William Ware, American novelist
- William Robert Ware, American architect

== See also ==
- Buzzy Wares (1886–1964), American baseball player
- Eddie Wares (1915–1992), Canadian hockey player
- Shamsul Wares (born 1946), Bangladeshi architect
- Wear (surname)
