= Charles Ware =

Charles Ware may refer to:

- Charles Pickard Ware (1849–1921), American educator and folk music transcriber
- Charles R. Ware (1911–1942), United States Navy officer, killed in the Battle of Midway
- Charlie Ware (Baker County, Georgia) (1914–1999), figure whose case was a major point in the civil rights movement
- Charles Eliot Ware (1814–1887), Boston physician in Boston
- USS Charles R. Ware (DD-865), a Gearing-class destroyer of the United States Navy in service from 1945 to 1974
- USS Charles R. Ware (DE-547), a proposed World War II United States Navy John C. Butler-class destroyer escort
- Charlie Ware (hurler, born 1933), Irish hurler for the Waterford senior team

== See also ==
- Charlie Ware (disambiguation)
