= Charlie Ware =

Charlie Ware may refer to:

- Charlie Ware Snr (1903–1984), Irish hurler
- Charlie Ware (Baker County, Georgia) (1914–1999), African-American victim of racial violence
- Charlie Ware (footballer) (1931–2017), English professional footballer
- Charlie Ware (hurler, born 1933), Irish hurler

== See also ==
- Charles Ware (disambiguation)
