= Exercise Strikeback =

Naval exercise

- Part of the Cold War (1953–1962)
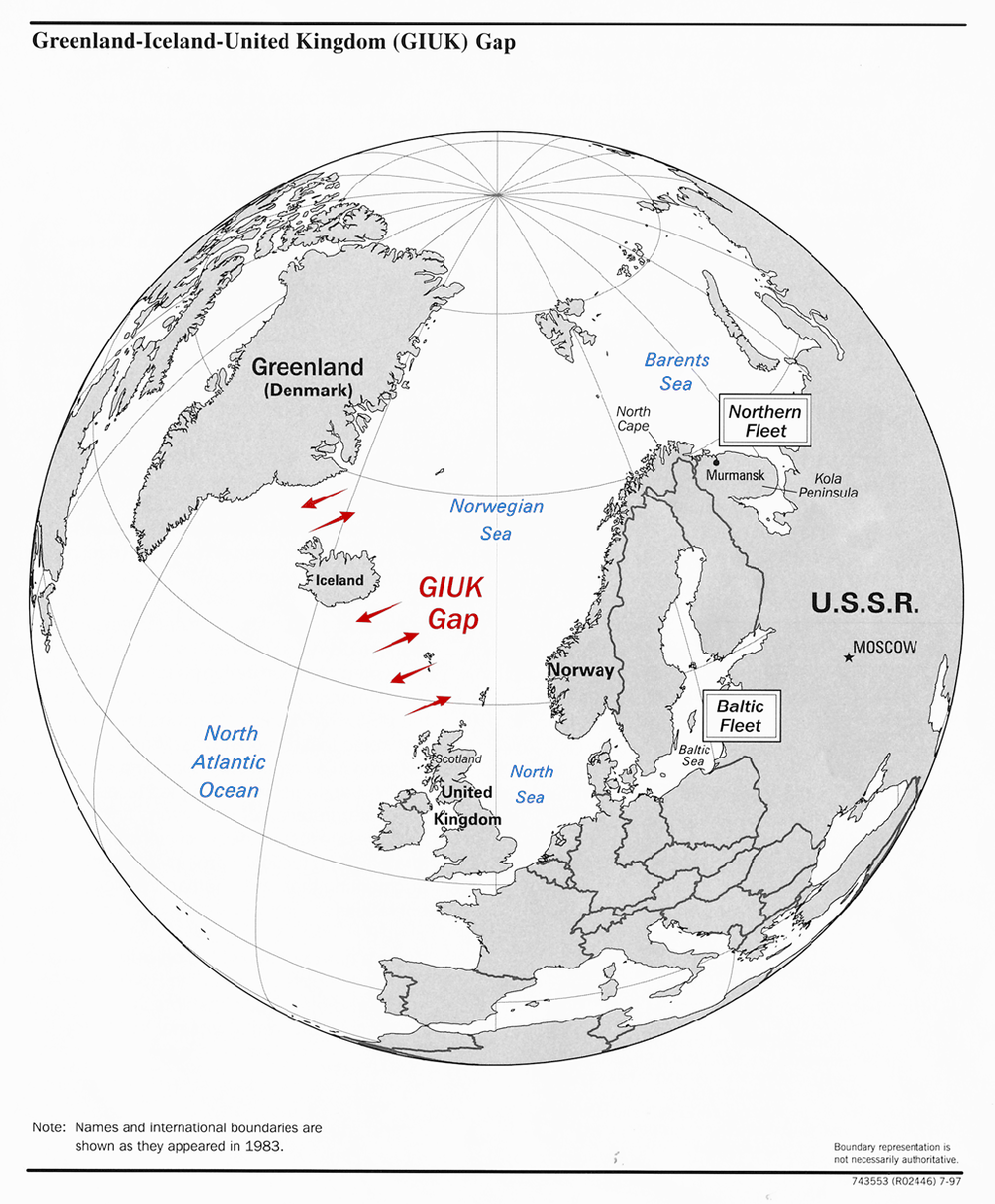
- The "GIUK Gap"
- Type: NATO multi-lateral naval training exercise
- Location: North Atlantic Ocean, GIUK Gap, Norwegian Sea
- Planned by: Supreme Allied Commander Atlantic
- Objective: Deployment of NATO anti-submarine warfare and aircraft carrier strike forces
- Date: 3–12 September 1957
- Executed by: Vice Admiral Robert B. Pirie, USN, Commander Striking Fleet Atlantic (STRIKFLTLANT)
- Outcome: Exercise successfully executed.

Exercise Strikeback, aka Operation Strikeback, was a major naval exercise of the North Atlantic Treaty Organization (NATO) that took place over a ten-day period in September 1957.

As part of a series of exercises to simulate an all-out Soviet attack on NATO, Exercise Strikeback was tasked with two objectives. Its initial objective was the deployment of NATO's naval forces (designated the "Blue Fleet") against other NATO forces attempting to simulate an "enemy" navy that featured a large number of submarines (designated the "Orange Fleet"). Its other objective was to have the Blue Fleet execute carrier-based air strikes against "enemy" formations and emplacements along NATO's northern flank in Norway.

Exercise Strikeback involved over 200 warships, 650 aircraft, and 75,000 personnel from the United States Navy, the Royal Navy, the Royal Canadian Navy, the French Navy, the Royal Netherlands Navy, and the Royal Norwegian Navy. As the largest peacetime naval operation up to that time, military reporter Hanson W. Baldwin of The New York Times said Exercise Strikeback gathered "the strongest striking fleet assembled since World War II."

Strikeback and the other concurrent NATO exercises held during the fall of 1957 would be the most ambitious military undertaking for the alliance to date, involving more than 250,000 men, 300 ships, and 1,500 aircraft operating from Norway to Turkey.

== Background ==
=== Strategic overview ===
Faced with the overwhelming numerical superiority of Soviet Union and Warsaw Pact military forces, NATO embraced the concept of the nuclear umbrella to protect Western Europe from a Soviet ground invasion. This strategy was initially articulated in January 1954 by U.S. Army General and then-Supreme Allied Commander Europe Alfred Gruenther:

We have ... an air-ground shield which, although still not strong enough, would force an enemy to concentrate prior to attack. In doing so, the concentrating force would be extremely vulnerable to losses from atomic weapon attacks ... We can now use atomic weapons against an aggressor, delivered not only by long-range aircraft, but also by the use of shorter range planes, and by 280 mm. artillery ... This air-ground team constitutes a very effective shield, and it would fight very well in case of attack.

This strategic concept reflected the American strategy of massive retaliation of the Eisenhower administration as set forth by Secretary of State John Foster Dulles:

We need allies and collective security. Our purpose is to make these relations more effective, less costly. This can be done by placing more reliance on deterrent power and less dependence on local defensive power ... Local defense will always be important. But there is no local defense which alone will contain the mighty landpower of the Communist world. Local defenses must be reinforced by the further deterrent of massive retaliatory power. A potential aggressor must know that he cannot always prescribe battle conditions that suit him.

=== NATO military command structure ===
NATO military command and areas of responsibilities (1954)

With the establishment of NATO's Allied Command Atlantic (ACLANT) on 30 January 1952, the Supreme Allied Commander Atlantic (SACLANT) joined the previously-created Supreme Allied Commander Europe (SACEUR) as one of the alliance's two principal parts of the NATO Military Command Structure. In addition, Allied Command Channel was established on 21 February 1952 to control the English Channel and North Sea area and deny it to the enemy, protect the sea lanes of communication, and Support operations conducted by SACEUR and SACLANT. The following key NATO military commands were involved in a series of alliance-wide exercises, including Operation Strikeback, during the Fall of 1957.

- Allied Command Atlantic (ACLANT)
- Supreme Allied Commander Atlantic (SACLANT) – Admiral Jerauld Wright, United States Navy
  - Deputy Supreme Allied Commander Atlantic (DSACLANT) – Vice-Admiral Sir John Eaton, RN
    - Chief of Staff (COFS) – Vice Admiral Harold Page Smith, United States Navy
  - Eastern Atlantic Area (EASTLANT) – Vice Admiral Sir John Eccles, RN
  - Western Atlantic Area (WESTLANT) – Admiral Jerauld Wright, United States Navy
  - Striking Fleet Atlantic (STRIKFLTLANT) – Vice Admiral Robert B. Pirie, United States Navy
- Allied Command Europe
- Supreme Allied Commander Europe (SACEUR) – General Lauris Norstad, USAF
  - Deputy Supreme Allied Commander Europe (DSACEUR) – Field Marshal The Viscount Montgomery of Alamein, British Army
    - Chief of Staff (COFS) – General Courtlandt Van R. Schuyler, USA
  - Allied Forces Northern Europe (AFNORTH) – Lieutenant-General Sir C.S. Sugden, British Army
  - Allied Forces Central Europe (AFCENT) – Général d'Armée Jean-Étienne Valluy, French Army
    - Allied Air Forces Central Europe (AAFCE) – Air Chief Marshal Sir George Holroyd Mills, RAF
    - Northern Army Group (NORTHAG) – General Sir Richard Nelson Gale, British Army
    - Central Army Group (CENTAG) – General Henry I. Hodes, USA
  - Allied Forces Southern Europe (AFSOUTH) – Admiral R.P.M. Bristol, United States Navy
    - Naval Striking and Support Forces Southern Europe (STRIKFORSOUTH) – Vice Admiral Charles R. Brown, United States Navy
  - Allied Forces Mediterranean (AFMED) – Admiral Sir Ralph Edwards, RN
- Allied Command Channel (CHANCOM)
- Commander-in-Chief Channel (CINCHAN) – Admiral Sir Guy Grantham, RN

== Operational history ==
As part of the response to a theoretical Soviet attack against NATO on all fronts, Operation Strikeback would test the capabilities of Allied naval forces (Blue Fleet) by tasking them to destroy the enemy navy (Orange Fleet) and its huge submarine fleet, protect transatlantic shipping, and undertake sustained carrier-based air strikes against the enemy positions.

Beginning on 3 September 1957, American and Canadian naval forces got underway to join British, French, Dutch, and Norwegian naval forces in eastern Atlantic and northern European waters under the overall command of Vice Admiral Robert B. Pirie, United States Navy, Commander, United States Second Fleet, acting as NATO's Commander Striking Fleet Atlantic. While en route, the U.S.-Canadian naval forces executed Operation Seaspray, a bilateral naval exercise to protect Blue Fleet's vitally-important underway replenishment group (URG) from enemy submarine attacks. The nuclear submarine Nautilus and the conventional submarine Trigger completed operations in the Arctic and joined 34 other U.S. and allied submarines temporarily assigned to the Orange Fleet. USS Mount McKinley was based in Portsmouth Naval Base as the command communications base for the Orange forces controlling Comsuborangelant/Comphiborangelant for the duration of the Exercise.

Operation Strikeback itself began on 19 September 1957, involving over 200 warships, 650 aircraft, and 65,000 personnel. To provide a more realistic simulation of protecting transatlantic shipping, over 200 merchant marine vessels, including the ocean liners Queen Mary and Ile de France, also participated as duly-flagged target ships for the exercise. Blue Fleet hunter-killer (HUK) groups centered around the carriers Essex, Wasp, and Tarawa, as well as submarines and land-based anti-submarine patrol aircraft, executed Operation Fend Off/Operation Fishplay to identify, track, and contain the breakout of the enemy Orange Fleet's submarine force along the Greenland-Iceland-UK gap (GIUK gap").

Operating above the Arctic Circle in the Norwegian Sea, the Blue Fleet, which included the new aircraft carriers Saratoga and Forrestal, launched carrier-based air strikes against enemy positions in Norway. Time magazine provided the following contemporary coverage of Operation Strikeback:

From somewhere southeast of Greenland came the crackle of an urgent radio message: "Being fired on by Orange surface raider. Inchcliffe Castle." With that alert from a famed but fictitious merchant vessel, simulated hell broke loose in the North Atlantic. Out to punish the "aggressors," a six-nation Blue fleet totaling nearly 160 fighting ships began steaming toward Norway. In the Iceland-Faeroes gap, 36 Orange submarines, including the atom-powered Nautilus, lay in wait. The U.S. destroyer Charles R. Ware was "sunk"; a "torpedo" slowed down the carrier U.S.S. Intrepid, and H.M.S. Ark Royal had a hot time beating off the assaults of Britain-based Valiant jet bombers. But by early afternoon, Blue carrier planes got through to make dummy atom attacks on Norway's ports, bridges and airfields. Into the midst of this earnest make-believe strayed a Russian trawler - a real one. The Russian, being overtaken, had the right of way and held it, passing diagonally through the entire NATO fleet as the big ships refueled and moved beyond her.

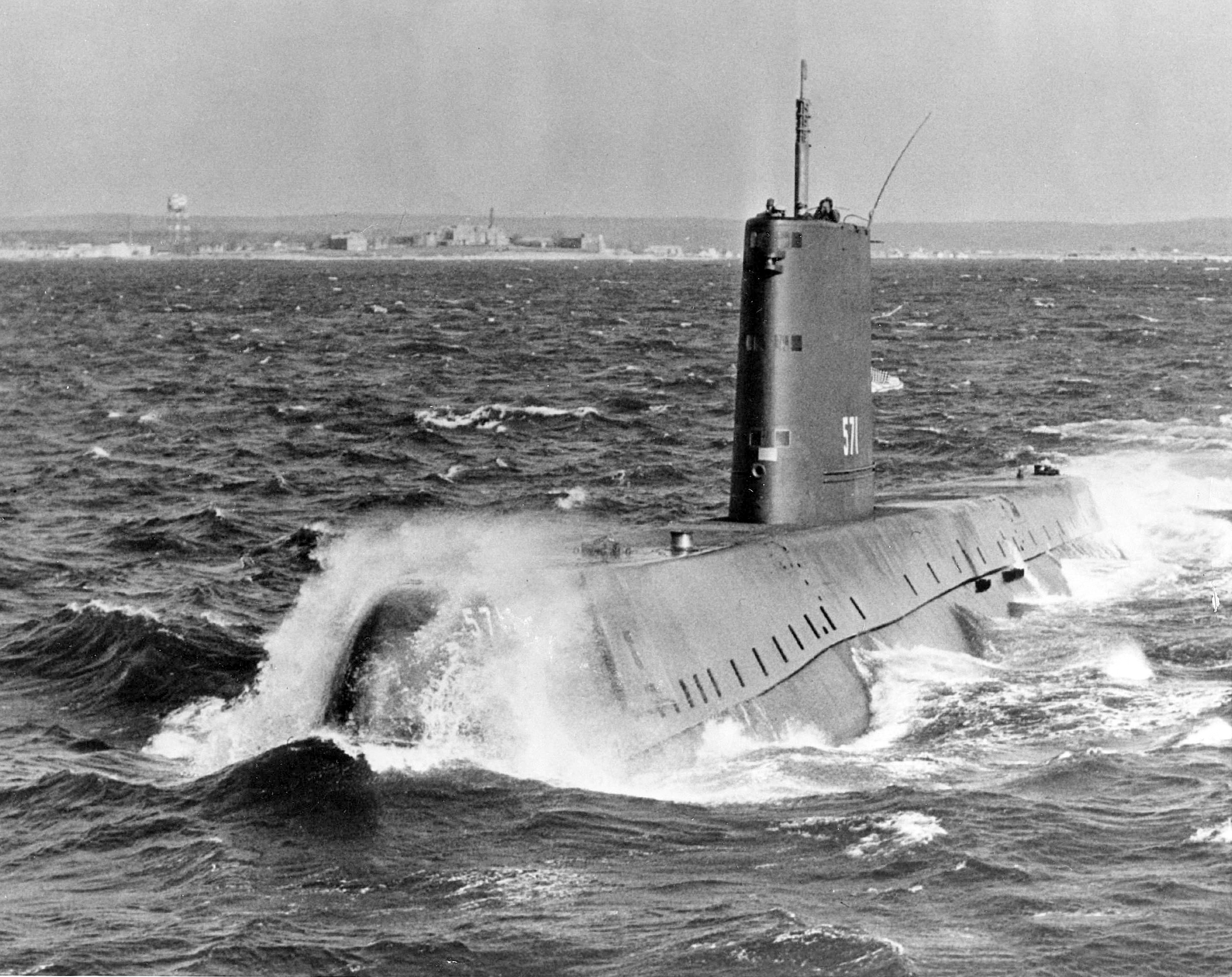
USS Nautilus

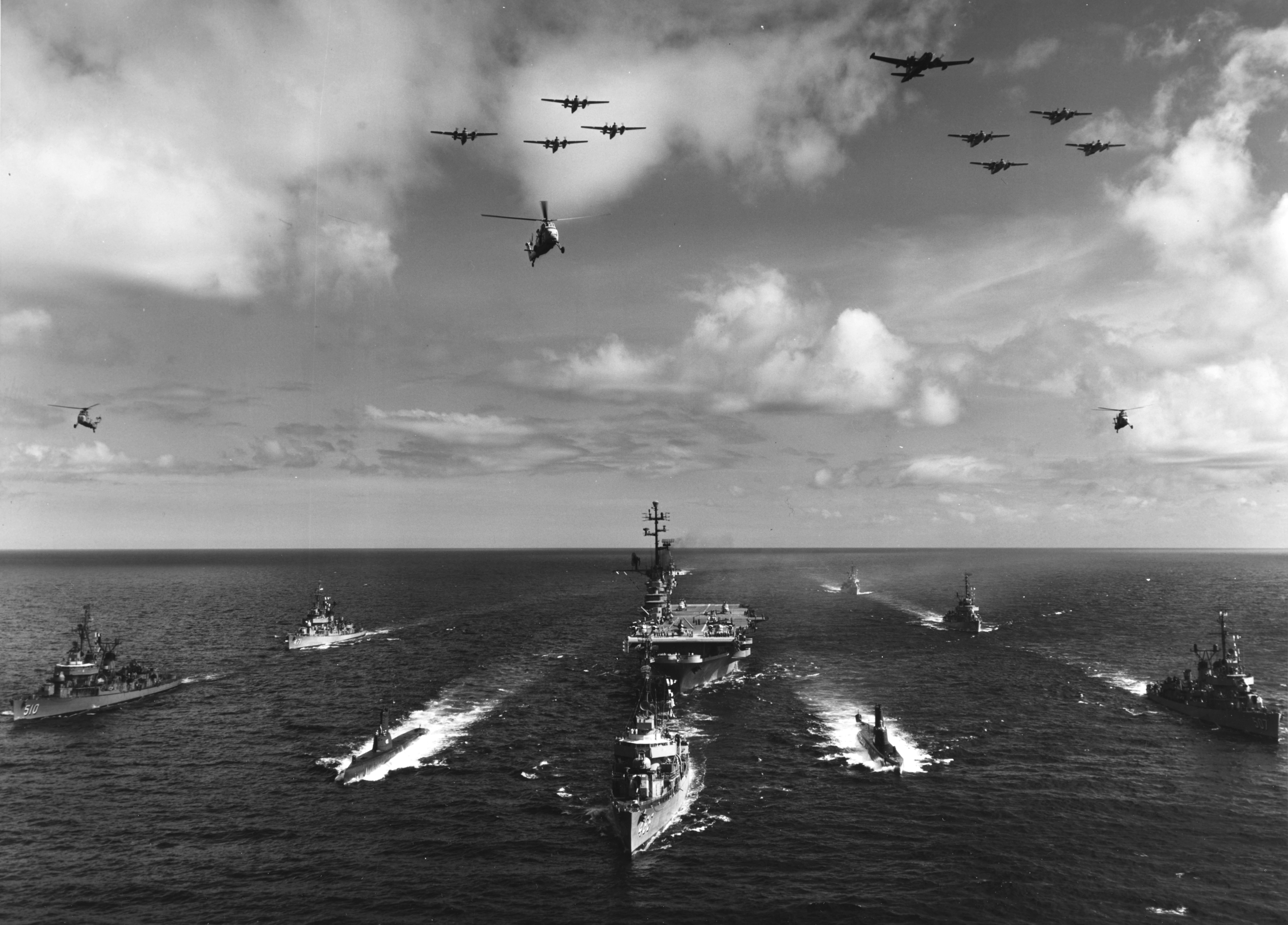
U.S. Navy ASW Task Force Alfa (1959)

Following the conclusion of Operation Strikeback, U.S. naval forces conducted Operation Pipedown, involving the protection of its underway replenishment group while en route back the United States.

SACLANT Admiral Jerauld Wright, United States Navy, described Operation Strikeback as being "remarkably successful" while also noting "[that] there is considerable scarcity of both naval and air forces in the eastern Atlantic." Wright's Eastern Atlantic allied commander, Vice Admiral Sir John Eccles, RN, also noted:

I am not in a position to criticize political decisions, but I say this as a professional man with over 40 years' experience — I cannot carry out my task as given to me at the moment without more forces. In recent years the submarine has, without any doubt at all, gone a very long way ahead of the devices with which we are presently equipped to sound and destroy it.

Particularly significant was the performance of nuclear-powered submarines with the U.S. Navy's first two such vessels, the USS Nautilus (SSN-571) and USS Seawolf (SSN-575), participating in Operation Strikeback. According to naval analyst-historian Norman Friedman, Nautilus "presented a greater threat than all 21 snorkel submarines combined" during Operation Strikeback, making 16 successful attacks against various naval formations while maintaining effective on-station tactical and high-speed pursuit capabilities. Nautilus cruised 3,384 nautical miles (6,267 km) with an average speed of 14.4 knots (26.7 km/h). In addition to the Nautilus, the Seawolf departed New London on 3 September for Operation Strikeback. Before she surfaced off Newport, Rhode Island, on 25 September, Seawolf had remained submerged for 16 days, cruising a total of 6,331 miles (10,189 km). Recognizing the need to meet this Anti-submarine warfare (ASW) challenge, the following actions were taken:

- Task Force Alfa was created by the U.S. Navy to develop improved ASW tactics and technology by integrating carrier-based ASW aircraft, land-based patrol aircraft, refitted destroyers, and hunter-killer submarines.
- NATO Undersea Research Centre was established by SACLANT on 2 May 1959 in La Spezia, Italy, to serve as a clearinghouse for NATO's anti-submarine efforts.

Operation Strikeback was the final deployment for the battleships Iowa and Wisconsin until their re-activation in the 1980s by the Reagan Administration. Finally, on the technical level, Operation Strikeback saw the first use of single sideband (SSB) voice communications for tactical operations by the United States Navy, and HMS Bulwark was the first Royal Navy carrier to use a magnetic loop communication system.

In addition to Operation Strikeback, which concentrated on its eastern Atlantic/northern European flank, NATO also conducted two other major military exercises in September 1957, Operation Counter Punch involving Allied Forces Central Europe on the European mainland and Operation Deep Water involving NATO's southern flank in the Mediterranean Sea.

== Naval forces ==
The following is a partial listing of naval forces known to have participated in Operation Strikeback.

=== Aircraft carriers and embarked air groups ===
- USS Saratoga (CVA-60) – Blue Fleet flagship
  - Carrier Air Group Seven
    - Fighter Squadron 61 (VF-61)
    - Attack Squadron 72 (VA-72)
    - Attack Squadron 75 (VA-75)
    - All-Weather Attack Squadron 33 (VA(AW)-33) Det.
    - Light Photographic Squadron 62 (VFP-62) Det.
    - Utility Helicopter Squadron 2 (HU-2) Det.
- USS Forrestal (CVA-59)
  - Carrier Air Group One
    - Fighter Squadron 14 (VF-14)
    - Fighter Squadron 84 (VF-84)
    - Attack Squadron 15 (VA-15)
    - Attack Squadron 76 (VA-76)
    - Heavy Attack Squadron 1 (VAH-1)
    - Airborne Early Warning Squadron 12 (VAW-12) Det.
    - All-Weather Attack Squadron 33 (AV(AW)-33) Det.
    - Utility Helicopter Squadron 2 (HU-2) Det.
- USS Intrepid (CVA-11)
  - Carrier Air Group Six:
    - Fighter Squadron 33 (VF-33)
    - Fighter Squadron 71 (VF-71)
    - Attack Squadron 25 (VA-25)
    - Attack Squadron 66 (VA-66)
    - Heavy Attack Squadron 11 (VAH-11)
    - All-Weather Attack Squadron 33 (VA(AW)-33) Det.
    - Light Photographic Squadron 62 (VFP-62) Det.
    - Airborne Early Warning Squadron 12 (VAW-12) Det.
    - Utility Helicopter Squadron 2 (UH-2) Det.
- USS Essex (CVA-9)
  - Squadrons embarked:
    - Air Anti-submarine Squadron 36 (VS-36)
    - Anti-submarine Helicopter Squadron 3 (HS-7)
    - Utility Helicopter Squadron 2 (HU-2) Det.
- USS Tarawa (CVS-40)
  - Squadrons embarked:
    - Air Anti-submarine Squadron 32 (VS-32)
    - Anti-submarine Helicopter Squadron 1 (HS-1)
    - Attack Squadron 172 (VA-172)
    - All-Weather Fighter Squadron 4 (VF(AW)-4) Det.
    - Utility Helicopter Squadron 2 (HU-2) Det.
- USS Wasp (CVS-18)
  - Squadrons embarked:
    - Attack Squadron 44 (VA-44)
    - Air Anti-submarine Squadron 27 (VS-27)
    - Air Anti-submarine Squadron 30 (VS-30)
    - Anti-submarine Helicopter Squadron 5 (HS-5)
    - Utility Helicopter Squadron 2 (HU-2) Det.
- HMS Ark Royal (R09) – Orange Fleet flagship
  - Squadrons embarked: 802, 804, 815, 831, 849B, 898
- HMS Bulwark (R08)
  - Squadrons embarked: 820, 845, 849D, 891
- HMS Eagle (R05)
  - Squadrons embarked: 803, 806, 813, 814, 848A

=== Naval aircraft ===
United States Navy:

- Fighters:
  - Grumman F-9 Cougar
    - VA-76 - F9F-8B
    - VA-44 - F9F-8
    - VA-66 - F9F-8B
    - VFP-62 - F9F-8P
  - McDonnell F3H Demon
    - VF-14 - F3H-2N
    - VF-61 - F3H-2M
  - Douglas F2H Banshee
    - VFP-62 - F2H-2P
    - VF-71 - F2H-3/4
    - VA-172 - F2H-2/2B
  - North American FJ-3 Fury
    - VF-33 - FJ-3/3M
    - VF-84- FJ-3M
- Anti-submarine (ASW) aircraft:
  - Lockheed P2V-5F Neptune
    - VP-8
    - VP-10
  - Grumman S2F Tracker
    - VS-27- S2F-1/2
    - VS-30 - S2F-1/2
    - VS-32 - S2F-1/2
    - VS-36 - S2F-1/2
- Attack bombers:
  - Douglas A-4 Skyhawk
    - VA-72 - A4D-1
  - Douglas AD Skyraider
    - VAW-12 - AD-5W
    - VA-15 - AD-6
    - VA-25 - AD-6
    - VA(AW)-33 - AD-5N, AD-5Q
    - VA-75 - AD-6
    - VF(AW)-4 – AD-5
  - Douglas A-3 Skywarrior
    - VAH-1 - A3D-1
  - North American AJ Savage
    - VAH-7 – AJ-2
    - VAH-11 – AJ-2
- Helicopters:
  - Piasecki HUP-2 Retriever
    - HU-2
  - Sikorsky HSS-1 Seabat
    - HS-5
    - HS-7

Royal Navy

- Fighter
  - 891 Naval Air Squadron
    - de Havilland Sea Venom
  - 894 Naval Air Squadron
    - de Havilland Sea Venom
  - 802 Naval Air Squadron
    - Hawker Sea Hawk
  - 803 Naval Air Squadron
    - Hawker Sea Hawk
  - 804 Naval Air Squadron
    - Hawker Sea Hawk
  - 806 Naval Air Squadron
    - Hawker Sea Hawk
  - 898 Naval Air Squadron
    - Hawker Sea Hawk
- torpedo/strike fighter
  - 813 Naval Air Squadron
    - Westland Wyvern
- Anti-submarine warfare
  - 814 Naval Air Squadron
    - Fairey Gannet
  - 815 Naval Air Squadron
    - Fairey Gannet
  - 820 Naval Air Squadron
    - Fairey Gannet
- Airborne Early Warning
  - 'A' Flight 849 Naval Air Squadron, Douglas Skyraider AEW.1
  - 'B' Flight 849 Naval Air Squadron
    - Douglas Skyraider AEW.1
  - 'D' Flight 849 Naval Air Squadron
    - Douglas Skyraider AEW.1
- Helicopters
  - 845 Naval Air Squadron
    - Westland Whirlwind:

==== Aircraft losses ====
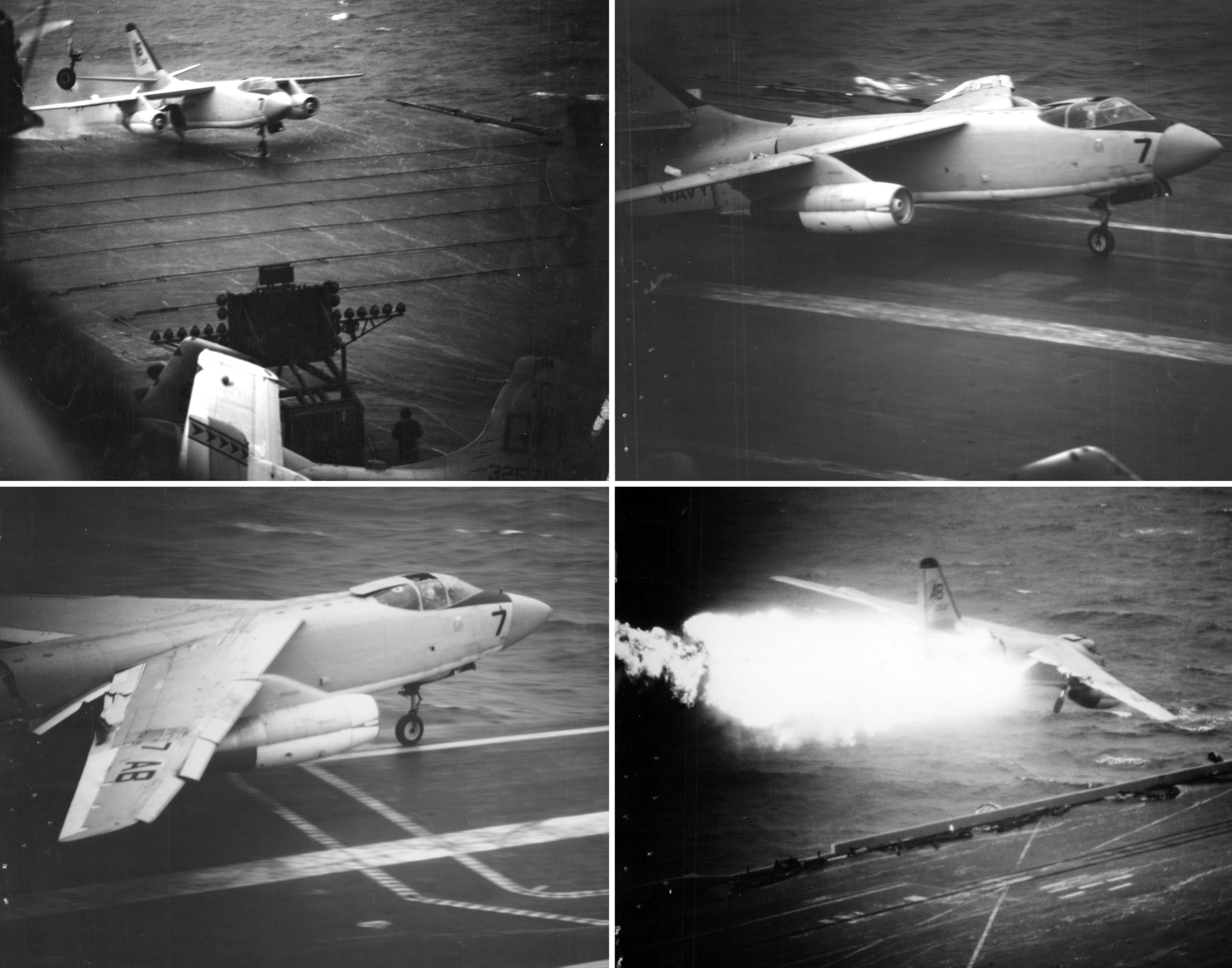
Forrestalcrash

- 24 September 1957 – An F4D Skyray jet fighter crashed into the sea while attempting to land back on board the USS Saratoga. During the subsequent search and rescue, two S2F-2 ASW aircraft of VS-36 off the USS Essex collided in mid-air and crashed into the sea. Two additional F4D Skyray aircraft crashed following a mid-air collision off Andøya, Norway. The total loss of life was 11.
- 26 September 1957 – An A3D-1 Skywarrior attack bomber crashed into the stern flight deck ramp while attempting to land on board the USS Forrestal (pictured). The aircraft was lost at sea, but the three-man crew was recovered.

=== Surface warships ===
Battleships:

- USS Wisconsin (BB-64)
- USS Iowa (BB-61)

Cruisers:

- USS Canberra (CAG-2)
- USS Boston (CAG-1)
- USS Macon (CA-132)
- USS Albany (CA-123)
- USS Northampton (CLC-1)
- HMS Gambia (48)
- HMS Sheffield (24)
- De Grasse (C610)

Destroyers:

- USS Mitscher (DL-2)
- USS Willis A. Lee (DL-4)
- USS Decatur (DD-936)
- USS John Paul Jones (DD-932)
- USS Forrest Sherman (DD-931)
- USS O'Hare (DDR-889)
- USS Forrest Royal (DD-872)
- USS Charles R. Ware (DD-865)
- USS Harwood (DD-861)
- USS McCaffery (DDE-860)
- USS Charles H. Roan (DD-853)
- USS Joseph P. Kennedy, Jr. (DD-850)
- USS Fiske (DDR-842)
- USS Robert A. Owens (DDE-827)
- USS Samuel B. Roberts (DD-823)
- USS Johnston (DD-821)
- USS Corry (DD-817)
- USS Robert K. Huntington (DD-781)
- USS Stormes (DD-780)
- USS Douglas H. Fox (DD-779)
- USS Massey (DD-778)
- USS Zellars (DD-777)
- USS James C. Owens (DD-776)
- USS Lowry (DD-770)
- USS Putnam (DD-757)
- USS Laffey (DD-724)
- USS William R. Rush (DDR-714)
- USS Hugh Purvis (DD-709)
- USS Harlan R. Dickson (DD-708)
- USS Gainard (DD-706)
- USS Compton (DD-705)
- USS Ault (DD-698)
- USS Charles S. Sperry (DD-697)
- USS Ingraham (DD-694)
- USS Moale (DD-693)
- USS Allen M. Sumner (DD-692)
- USS Hunt (DD-674)
- USS Caperton (DD-650)
- USS Abbot (DD-629)
- USS The Sullivans (DD-537)
- USS Daly (DD-519)
- USS Eaton (DDE-510)
- USS Cony (DDE-508)
- USS Beale (DDE-471)

Destroyer escorts:

- USS Joseph K. Taussig (DE-1030)
- USS Courtney (DE-1021)
- USS Hammerberg (DE-1015)
- USS Cromwell (DE-1014)
- USS Dealey (DE-1006)
- USS Snowden (DE-246)
- USS Peterson (DE-152)
- USS Huse (DE-145)

Amphibious vessels:

- USS Mount McKinley (AGC-7)
- USS Washtenaw County (LST-1166)

Royal Canadian Navy destroyers

- HMCS Iroquois (DDE 217)
- HMCS St. Laurent (DDE 205)
- HMCS Ottawa (DDE 229)
- HMCS Saguenay (DDE 206)
- HMCS Assiniboine (DDE 234)
- HMCS Haida (DDE 215)
- HMCS Micmac (DDE 214)
- HMCS Nootka (DDE 213)

=== Submarine forces ===
Nuclear submarines:

- USS Seawolf (SSN-575)
- USS Nautilus (SSN-571)

Support vessels:

- USS Fulton (AS-11)
- USS Papago (ATF-160)
- USS Luiseno (ATF-156)

Diesel-electric submarines:

- USS Darter (SS-576)
- USS Trigger (SS-564)
- USS Odax (SS-484)
- USS Runner (SS-476)
- USS Trumpetfish (SS-425)
- USS Quillback (SS-424)
- USS Torsk (SS-423)
- USS Piper (SS-409)
- USS Sea Poacher (SS-406)
- USS Sea Owl (SS-405)
- USS Jallao (SS-368)
- USS Halfbeak (SS-352)
- USS Chopper (SS-342)
- USS Bergall (SS-320)
- USS Becuna (SS-319)
- USS Barbero (SSG-317)
- USS Redfin (SSR-272)
- USS Ray (SSR-271)
- USS Pompon (SSR-267)
- USS Croaker (SSK-246)
- USS Cavalla (SSK-244)
- USS Angler (SSK-240)
- USS Grouper (SSK-214)

=== Naval auxiliaries ===
Underway Replenishment Group (URG):

- USS Suribachi (AE-21) (flagship)
- USS Shasta (AE-6)
- USS Denebola (AF-56)
- USS Caloosahatchee (AO-98)
- USS Allagash (AO-97)
- USS Nantahala (AO-60)
- USS Kankakee (AO-39)
- USS Kennebec (AO-36)

Fleet Support:

- USS Grand Canyon (AD-28)
- USS Cadmus (AR-14)

=== Land-based ASW patrol aircraft ===
==== U.S. Navy Fleet Air Wing 3 ====
The United States Navy deployed two patrol squadron from Fleet Air Wing Three (FAW-3) to participate in Operation Strikeback:

- Patrol Squadron 8 (VP-8) operated out of Argentia, Newfoundland.
- Patrol Squadron 10 (VP-10) operated out of Keflavik, Iceland.

Both squadrons flew Lockheed P2V-5F Neptune ASW patrol aircraft.

==== RAF Coastal Command ====
The Royal Air Force assigned two squadrons from RAF Coastal Command to participate in Operation Strikeback. Both squadrons flew Avro Shackleton patrol bombers:

- No. 204 Squadron deployed to RAF Kinloss
- No. 269 Squadron deployed to RAF Wick

=== U.S. Marine Corps units ===
The following units of the United States Marine Corps participated in Operation Strikeback in September 1957 are listed below.

- Regimental Landing Team 8 (RLT-8)
- Battalion Landing Team 1/2

== See also ==
- Cold War (1953–1962)
- Operation Deep Water

== Bibliography ==
- Dulles, John Foster (12 January 1954). "The Evolution of Foreign Policy". Department of State, Press Release (81). Archived from the original on 18 April 2008.
- Clearwater, John (1998). Canadian Nuclear Weapons: The Untold Story of Canada's Cold War Arsenal. Dundurn Press Ltd. ISBN 1-55002-299-7.
- Donnelly, Ralph W.; Gabrielle M. Nuefield; Carolyn A. Tyson (1971). A Chronology of the United States Marine Corps, 1947–1964 Volume III (PDF). USMC Headquarters - Historical Division. ISBN 978-1-4819-8751-6.
- Friedman, Norman (September 1994). U.S. Submarines Since 1945: An Illustrated Design History. Naval Institute Press. ISBN 1-55750-260-9.
- Jones, William K. (1987). A Brief History of the 6th Marines. USMC Headquarters - Historical Division. ISBN 1-900031-00-0.
- Key Jr., David M. (2001). Admiral Jerauld Wright: Warrior among Diplomats. Sunflower University Press. ISBN 0-89745-251-8.
- Lord Ismay, NATO the first five years 1949-1954, North Atlantic Treaty Organisation, 1954
- Sturtivant, Ray; Theo Ballance (1994). The Squadrons of the Fleet Air Arm, first edition. Air Britain. ISBN 0-85130-223-8.
- Trauschweizer, Igor Wolfgang (2006). "Creating Deterrence for Limited War: The U.S. Army and the Defense of West Germany, 1953-1982; PhD dissertation" (PDF). Department of History - University of Maryland, College Park.
- USS Wasp Veterans Association (1999). U. S. S. Wasp CV 18. Turner Publishing Company. ISBN 978-1-56311-404-5.
- Benedict, John R. (Spring 2005). "The Unraveling and Revitalization of U.S. Navy Antisubmarine Warfare" (PDF). Naval War College Review. 58 (2): 92–120.
- Porter, Richard E. (March–April 1977). "Correlation of Forces: Revolutionary Legacy". Air University Review. Archived from the original on 27 April 2014.
- Trainor, Bernard E. (February 2008). "Triumph in Strategic Thinking". United States Naval Institute Proceedings. 134 (2). 40 – 42.
- "The day Nautilus came to Portland". Dorset Echo. 5 October 2007.
- Baldwin, Hanson W. (22 September 1957). "100 Fighting Ships in Vast Exercise". The New York Times. p. 9.
- Trainor, Bernard E. (23 March 1987). "Lehman's Sea-War Strategy Is Alive, but for How Long?". The New York Times.
- "Emergency Call" Time — 30 September 1957
- "All Ashore" Time — 7 October 1957
- "Antisubmarine Boss" Time — 7 April 1958
- "The Goblin Killers" Time — 1 September 1958
- A-3 Skywarrior aircraft lost with crew lists, p. 2 A-3 Skywarrior Association
- Descriptive List of Accidents, p. 2 A-3 Skywarrior Association
- Ballykelly's Shackleton Era 1952-1971
- Chronological History — U.S. Naval Communications
- The National Association of Destroyer Veterans
- Loss and Ejections: F4D-1 Skyray - Project Get Out and Walk
- HMCS Iroquois
- HMS Bulwark - Fleet Air Arm Archives
- Go Navy
- United States Navy Crew Crashes While On NATO Maneuvers In The Atlantic 24 September 1957 - Arlington National Cemetery
- Dictionary of American Naval Aviation Squadrons Volume 1 The History of VA, VAH, VAK, VAL, VAP and VFA Squadrons
- Dictionary of American Naval Aviation Squadrons Volume 2 The History of VP, VPB, VP(H) and VP(AM) Squadrons
- Photo gallery of USS Intrepid (CV-11) at NavSource Naval History
- Senior officials in the NATO military structure, from 1949 to 2001
- History, 1952 - 1963 - No. 269 Squadron RAF
- Sea Story - USS Essex Association
