= Senator Ware (disambiguation) =

Nicholas Ware (1776–1824) was a U.S. Senator from Georgia from 1821 to 1824. Senator Ware may also refer to:

- Eugene Fitch Ware (1841–1911), Kansas State Senate
- James Britton Ware (1830–1918), Georgia State Senate
- James Franklin Ware (1849–1934), Wisconsin State Senate
- John H. Ware III (1908–1997), Pennsylvania State Senate
- Mary Ware (politician) (born 1951), Kansas State Senate
