= Josie Murphy =

Irish hurler

Joseph Murphy was an Irish hurler. At club level he played for Ferrybank and was a substitute on the Waterford senior hurling team that won the 1948 All-Ireland Championship. Murphy's uncle, Charlie Ware, was a member of the Waterford team that lost the 1938 All-Ireland final.
