= James Ware =

James Ware may refer to:

== Medicine ==
- James Ware (ophthalmologist) (1756–1815), English eye surgeon and Fellow of Royal Society
- James Ware (surgeon) (1941–2015), British surgeon and medical educator

== Politics ==
- James Britton Ware (1830–1918), American senator from Georgia
- James Franklin Ware (1849–?), American politician

== Sports ==
- Jim Ware (hurler) (1908–1983), Irish hurler
- Jim Ware (basketball) (1944–1986), American professional basketball player
- James Ware (born 1958), American professional wrestler better known as Koko B. Ware

== Other ==
- James Ware (historian) (1594–1666), Irish historian
- James Redding Ware (1832–1900s), British novelist and playwright
- James E. Ware (1846–1918), American architect
- James H. Ware (1941–2016), American biostatistician and Dean of Harvard T.H. Chan School of Public Health
- James Ware (judge) (born 1946), United States district judge
