= Cecil E. Harris =

American naval aviator

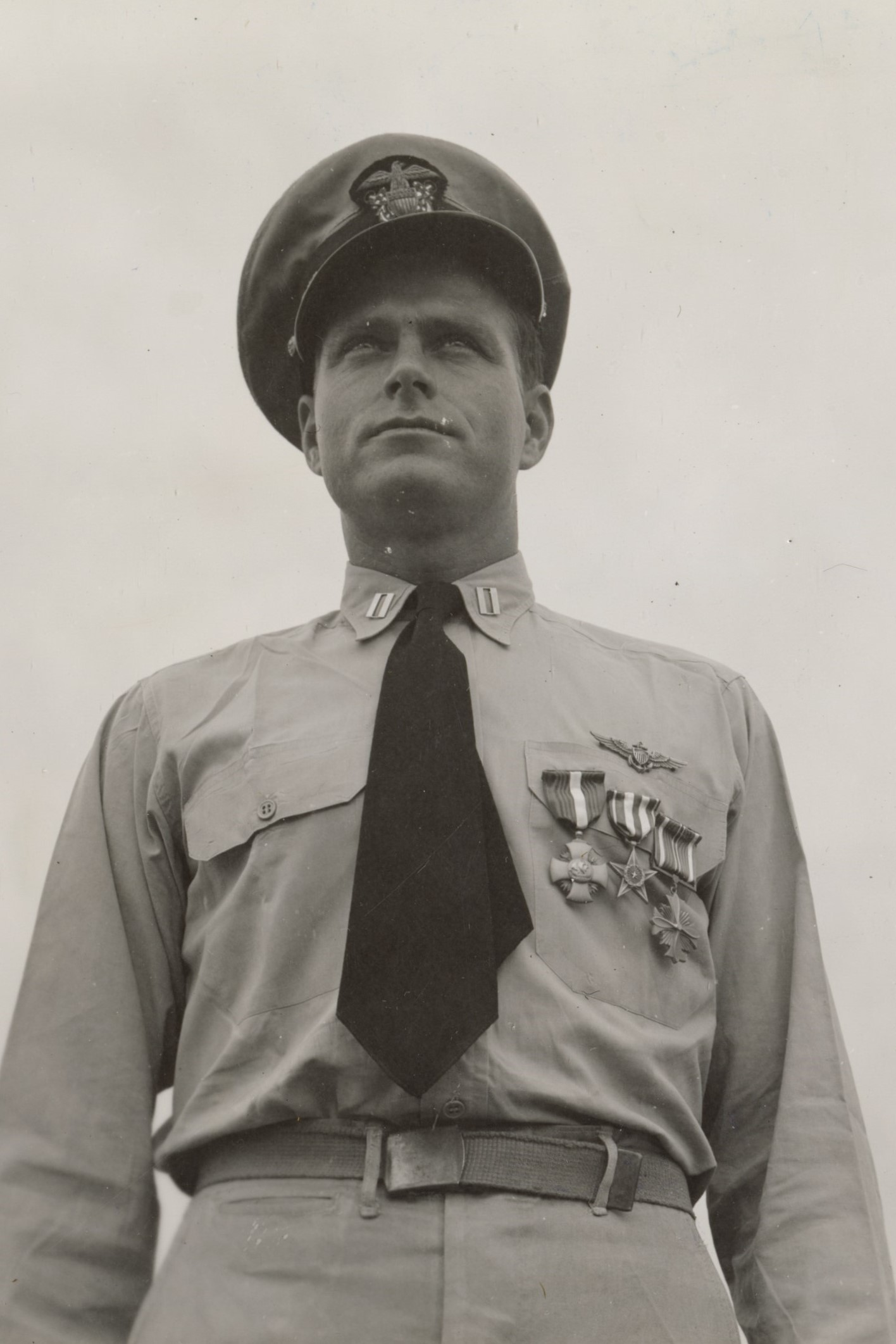
- Lt. Cecil E. Harris, USNR, after returning home from combat in January 1945.
- Born: December 2, 1916; Faulkton, South Dakota, United States
- Died: December 2, 1981 (aged 65); Groveton, Virginia, United States
- Burial place: Arlington National Cemetery
- Military career
- Allegiance: United States
- Branch: United States Navy
- Service years: 1941–1967
- Rank: Captain
- Nicknames: "Cece" "Speedball"
- Units: VGF-27, USS Suwannee; VF-18, USS Intrepid
- Conflicts: World War II: Operation Torch; Solomon Islands Campaign; Philippines campaign; Korean War
- Awards: Navy Cross; Silver Star (2); Distinguished Flying Cross (3); Air Medal (3)

Captain Cecil Elwood "Cece" Harris (December 2, 1916 – December 2, 1981) was an American schoolteacher, naval aviator and flying ace of World War II. Harris is remembered for actions in the Pacific Ocean Theater, which earned him nine combat medals including the Navy Cross, the highest award for valor after the Medal of Honor. He ended the war as the navy's second-highest-scoring ace after David McCampbell (34), credited with shooting down 24 Japanese planes. Harris scored 16 of his aerial victories in four different days, downing four enemy aircraft on each of those days. Never during the course of his 88-day tour with VF-18 did a bullet hit his aircraft. It has been said that Harris "was arguably the most consistently exceptional fighter pilot in the US Navy".

== Pre-war ==
Cecil Elwood Harris was born in Faulkton, South Dakota, on December 2, 1916, to Howard and Jennie Harris. After graduating from Cresbard High School in 1934, Harris attended Northern State Teachers College, in Aberdeen, South Dakota. He took a leave from college after a year to teach in Onaka, South Dakota, where he met his future wife Eva. Harris returned to NSTC in 1940 to complete his undergraduate degree. Upon returning to school he enrolled in a civilian pilot training course, which ultimately led to his enlistment in the United States Naval Reserve on March 26, 1941. By March 12, 1942, he finished training at NAS Corpus Christi and was designated a naval aviator.

== World War II ==
=== Snapshot ===
Cecil Harris first served aboard the escort carrier USS Suwannee, reporting for duty on May 30, 1942. He was a pilot in VGF-27, which provided support for Operation Torch in North Africa and later flew sorties in the Solomon Islands Campaign. During this latter period Harris, flying a Grumman F4F Wildcat as part of a detachment posted on Guadalcanal, scored his first aerial victory. After his stint with Suwannee ended he was transferred to VF-36, which was eventually re-designated as VF-18. "Fighting 18" boarded USS Intrepid on August 16, 1944, as part of its Air Group 18.

Though he was only a lieutenant at the time, many of VF-18's green pilots turned to Harris for advice. The squadron's commanding officer similarly recognized Harris's ability and made him flight operations officer. According to later testimony from his peers, the tactical and flight training Harris provided to his outfit helped see them through the war. His prowess on the wing would save a number of them in more direct fashion, both in dog fights and carrier landings. On October 29, Intrepid entered a squall with a Combat Air Patrol inbound. Though many from VB-18 and VT-18 were forced to water land, Harris used his dead reckoning and other navigation skills to find the carrier in the storm. He landed successfully and radioed information to men in the air, saving them from the risks of water landing and preserving valuable aircraft.

After eleven weeks of flying combat missions from Intrepid with Air Group 18, Harris had scored 23 of the group's total 187 confirmed kills. Over half of his VF-18 kills derive from four separate engagements in which he downed at least four Japanese planes: September 13 over Negros Island, October 12 over Formosa, October 29 over Clark Field on Luzon and November 25 over Nielsen Field and en route to Intrepid. For each of these individual engagements Harris was awarded medals, culminating with the receipt of the Navy Cross for the actions of October 29. On October 24 he shot down two Japanese floatplanes. The kamikaze attacks of November 25, 1944, put Intrepid out of commission for a stretch and saw VF-18 detached from Air Group 18. VF-18 stayed for less than a week on USS Hancock before it detached yet again, this time for Pearl Harbor; Cecil Harris was headed home. He arrived stateside January 16, 1945.

VF-18 was reformed and returned to Air Group 18 on January 25, 1945. Many of the former VF-18 fighter pilots returned to the reformed squadron, including Harris, who served as Flight Officer. He was married at Seaside, Oregon, while serving with this outfit. Training commenced immediately at NAS Astoria in Oregon and continued at NAS North Island in San Diego, where the group was transferred on April 19. The squadron trained in night fighting, the use of rockets, and on the newly introduced Grumman F8F Bearcat. They would never see combat as a unit because of the Japanese surrender in August of that year.

=== Aerial victories ===
| Date | Type | Total |
|---|---|---|
| April 1, 1943 | 2 A6M Zeke | 2 |
| September 13, 1944 | 1 A6M Zeke, 3 A6M Zeke 32 | 4 |
| October 12, 1944 | 1 Ki-21 Sally, 1 Ki-48 Lily, 2 A6M Zeke | 4 |
| October 14, 1944 | 3 D4Y Judy | 3 |
| October 21, 1944 | 1 Ki-21 Sally (Assist) | N/A |
| October 24, 1944 | 2 F1M Pete | 2 |
| October 29, 1944 | 3 Ki-44 Tojo, 1 A6M Zeke | 4 |
| November 19, 1944 | 1 A6M Zeke | 1 |
| November 25, 1944 | 3 Ki-44 Tojo, 1 A6M3-32 Hamp | 4 |

=== VF-18 in detail ===
==== September ====
The air group cut its teeth off the coast of Babelthuap, the largest island of Palau, on September 6, 1944. They encountered no aerial opposition during any of the day's strikes. Fighters escorted the bombers to their targets, strafing anti-aircraft positions and military installations along the western coast of the island. Meager anti-aircraft fire and fair visibility allowed the air group to drop in excess of 46 short tons (42,000 kg) of ordnance on its first day of bonafide combat.

Japanese resistance stiffened when Intrepid moved on to the Philippines. Fighters reported moderate to intense anti-aircraft fire of all calibers during strikes on Mindanao September 9, but enemy pilots remained scarce. Air Group Commander (CAG) William Ellis personally witnessed his torpedo squadron score two direct hits on the runway at Matina field with 1 short ton (910 kg) bombs. Likewise, strikes later in the day cratered Daliao airfield, knocking it out of operation. This was the first day Harris was mentioned in the VF-18 action reports. During the dawn fighter sweep, he led a division to Davao Gulf that sunk two small craft and left a third, larger one ablaze. After incendiary strikes on the 10th, the carrier spent a day refueling before heading north to the Visayas.

Harris became an ace on September 13 when he and Lt. James Neighbours led divisions in a dawn strike on Negros Island. Both divisions flew 500 ft (150 m) above the bombers, Neighbors' planes positioned in front to provide close support while Harris's division covered the rear. By the time the strike force crossed over the coast of Negros, USS Bunker Hill's Air Group 8 was already engaging Japanese interceptors. Enemy aircraft came after Intrepid's bombers just a moment later.

A lone "Zero" emerged from the cloud cover below Air Group 18, attempting to sneak up on the formation from behind. Harris spotted the enemy early on and led his division down in pursuit, chasing the Japanese fighter away from the air group and back into the cloud cover from which it had appeared. Harris and company followed him down through the clouds into the open skies above Fabrica airfield, where a "hornets nest" of enemy planes was waiting for them. A melee ensued, causing one Zero to break ranks in the face of an attack by Burley. Burley hit his target but did not have time to verify the kill—another Zero came in from behind, forcing him to take evasive action. Fortunately, Harris was behind this second Japanese fighter and shot him down just a moment later. Flying back toward the bombers, Harris spotted a single Zero Type 32 "Hamp" climbing in front of him, headed in the same direction and apparently intent on attacking the bomber squadrons. Harris pulled up above the enemy and turned inside of him, putting a burst into the plane from 7 o'clock. It went down in flames. Harris then observed the pilots from his division fighting hard over the air strip, so he doubled back to render assistance. As he headed down, he was jumped from 7 o'clock, by two Hamps. He pulled up hard and swung left, allowing his pursuers to overshoot their runs before he tacked back to the right, putting himself above and behind them. Harris dove on his former pursuers with his guns firing, causing one plane to explode and the other to flee the scene. Once more seeking out his division, Harris approached a cluster of planes that turned out to be still more Zero 32s. Harris's Hellcat had no problem outpacing them. After he'd put enough distance between himself and the group, he looped back and approached the enemy formation head on in a low side run. His target, the last Zero in formation, exploded a mere 200 ft (61 m) from Harris, who finally spotted some fellow Hellcats. He broke off his engagement to follow the other VF-18 pilots to the rendezvous point.

September 13 represented the first day that Air Group 18 encountered significant resistance in the Pacific skies. From Harris's Strike 2 Able through to the fourth and final strike of the day, Strike 2 Dog, 41 Japanese planes were shot down by Admiral Gerald F. Bogan's Task Group 38.2 and a similar number were destroyed on the ground by bombing and strafing runs.

On September 14 Harris was credited with damaging a Sally on the ground during strafing attacks on Alicante airstrip. The next day the task group retired to rendezvous with oilers and escort carriers, which refueled the ships and provided replacement aircraft on the 16th. Heading off the coast of the Palaus, the air group provided air support throughout the day for Marine landings during the Battle of Peleliu on September 17. The fighter squadron loaded their belly tanks with napalm to drop on targets at Peleliu and Angaur in addition to the conventional bombs dropped by the VB and VT squadrons. September 18–20 were spent refueling and moving towards the next target: Luzon.

Air Group 18 and the other air groups in ComCarDiv 4 flew the first carrier strikes on Luzon since its capture by Japanese forces, making strikes on shipping in the proximity of Subic Bay and bombing installations at Clark Field between September 21 and 22. The first of these was a banner day for VF-18's fighter pilots. Lt(jg) Charles M. Mallory made ace in a day with five aircraft to his name; Lt. Harvey P. Picken destroyed four-and-one-half aircraft. (Note: Picken was credited a shared victory against a Betty, splitting the kill with G.J. Eckel and therefore earning a fractional score.) One of the last actions taken before the task group retired to Ulithi for the remainder of September was a long-range, fighter-bomber strike on shipping in Coron Bay. Achieving total surprise on the morning of September 24, Air Group 18 alone reportedly accounted for around 50,000 short tons (45,000,000 kg) sunk.

==== October ====
Half of Harris's credited kills were achieved in October, coinciding with Japanese planners' final attempt at provoking a decisive battle with the American fleet. On October 1, 1944, while still anchored at Ulithi, Intrepid was made Admiral Bogan's flagship. The carrier disembarked from harbor on October 7 to head for the waters southeast of Okinawa. It was scheduled to be part of strikes on Okinawa, the Ryukyus and Luzon leading up to a planned invasion of Leyte. These strikes began on October 10, targeting Okinawan airfields including Naha, Yontan and Ie Shima, as well as nearby shipping. Anti-aircraft fire ranged from meager to intense with flak worsening throughout the day. But, regardless of strike time, or target, there was virtually no aerial opposition encountered.

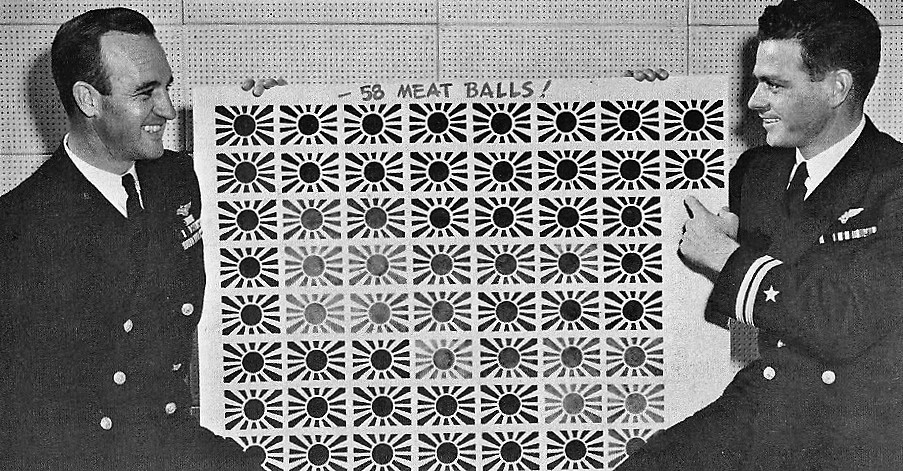
David McCampbell and Cecil Harris, with 34 and 24 aerial victories respectively, pose with their collective 58 "meatballs."

Airfields, harbors and shipping were also the targets on October 12, this time in northern Formosa. These would be the first strikes Fighting 18 executed in the face of both significant anti-aircraft fire and airborne interception by enemy planes. The first fighter sweep of the day launched into overcast skies at 06:17 and headed for Shinchiku Airfield with VF-18 flying low cover. Unfortunately, the Japanese were alerted to the formation's presence ahead of time, and the morning's protective cloud cover dissipated above Shinchiku. Flak of all calibers was intense as a result. Harris and the other Intrepid fighters led the way in, pushing over in glide bombing attacks on hangars around the strip. After the bombs dropped, the fighters headed north for their next target, Matsuyama Airfield. On the way to Matsuyama the cloud cover thickened once more. Just shy of Taien Airfield, VF-18 pilots spotted six Japanese bombers working their way down through a layer of clouds, seemingly on a landing approach. Intrepid's fighters caught and destroyed the whole bomber formation in two minutes. Harris was credited with shooting down two of them.

Immediately after this engagement, a group of over one dozen Zeros broke through the cloud layer above Intrepid's divisions. Enemies continued to come through the clouds in pairs until there were 40 or more Japanese aircraft operating against pilots from Fighting 18 and Bunker Hill's VF-8. Harris claimed two more kills during a wild encounter, and his wingman "Jimmy" Burley scored three. They were one of the few sections that managed to stay together throughout the engagement. By the end of the fight, VF-18 accounted for 25 Japanese planes shot down and suffered three losses in return.

On October 14, Japanese air forces attempted a reprisal against Task Force 38, but poor weather conditions complicated their search for the U.S. fleet. Only approximately 25 bombers made it to the vicinity of Task Group 38.2. VF-18's Combat Air Patrol (CAP), which had been flying above the task group continuously for almost two hours, was vectored to intercept these bombers just outside the task group's picket. They took care of the first formation of twelve bombers that emerged from the clouds. Two recently launched divisions of VF-18 Snooper Anti-Submarine Patrol (SNASP) were also routed to intercept, including one division led by Harris. His division had barely finished grouping up after launch when they sighted a second formation of bombers coming towards the ships. Harris exploded one midair then raked a second, sending it crashing into the sea.

The biggest risk posed to the SNASP Hellcats was not enemy bombers but their own task group's anti-aircraft fire. Harris and company withdrew back to the edge of the screen to protect themselves from the ships' guns. There they spotted another Yokosuka D4Y ("Judy") being chased by a CAP Hellcat unable to hit his target—it turned out the guns on his new plane were not properly adjusted. Harris pulled in from 5 o'clock and shot down his third "Judy" of the day. At the end of the day, only one out of an estimated 30 bombers penetrated the picket, putting a bomb just shy of the carrier Hancock. According to the Air Group's War History, the Commander-in-Chief of the Pacific Fleet (CinCPac) wrote of the recent activity of the Third Fleet:

My congratulations to you on the recent Pacific news. Will you please join Bard, Gates and myself in your messages to Halsey and Mitscher. The air and sea power of the THIRD FLEET is making history. All hands in the long line of support throughout the Navy are grateful for the opportunity of working for such a team — James Forrestal In its recent crucial offensive the THIRD FLEET has been a source of pride to us all and has inflicted destruction and disaster on our enemy which he will not forget. WELL DONE. Signed CinCPac.

The task group moved from Formosa to Luzon in anticipation of "A" Day, the Sixth Army's coming invasion of Leyte. Strikes were launched against Aparri Harbor and Laog Airfield on October 18 to weaken Japanese resistance to the U.S. Army landings. TG 38.2 was in position for air support of General Douglas MacArthur's troops by the morning of October 21, at which time its air groups conducted further strikes against Japanese installations in Luzon and the Visayas. During the very first strike of this operation, Harris and his wingman Burley tag-teamed a Mitsubishi Ki-21 ("Sally") near San Jose air base. First Harris hit the cockpit from 6 o'clock and left the plane smoking. Burley came in under Harris, and his machine guns flamed the twin-engine bomber. Harris finally came in on a third pass that blew the plane to pieces.

Decisions made during the next two days had a dramatic impact on the experience of Air Group 18 at the Battle of Leyte Gulf. TG 38.1 was detached and sent to Ulithi for replenishment and rearmament after two weeks of continuous operations against Okinawa and the Ryukyus Islands. USS Bunker Hill and Hancock were also detached from TG 38.2 at this time, leaving Intrepid the sole Essex-class aircraft carrier in its group. When Admiral Takeo Kurita's Center Force was sighted entering the Sibuyan Sea on October 24, the only task group readily available to strike was the shorthanded TG 38.2.

Pilots of Air Group 18 recalled the day being their toughest yet. Those assigned to the day's three strikes took on Center Force and its Yamato-class battleship, fearsome vessels bristling with armaments including nine 18.1-inch (460 mm) guns. Harris and three other fighters were assigned to a special search mission along the northwest coast of Palawan Island. Though they did not turn up any targets of value in the area of Imuruan Bay, Harris destroyed two Mitsubishi F1Ms ("Petes"), bringing his total score to 15.

The Japanese battleship Musashi was sunk after taking a great deal of punishment from Intrepid's air group. However, Center Force was able to limp back through San Bernardino Strait with Japanese battleship Yamato and a number of other ships intact. Intrepid was called north to go after a reported Japanese carrier group, Northern Force, which it encountered on October 25. Anti-aircraft fire was once again extremely intense, but this time Air Group 18 made it through the day without the loss of a single pilot. The group's strikes were reported likely to have sunk a light carrier and to have damaged both a carrier and a second light carrier. Northern Force was a diversion, however: Center Force had turned around and reentered San Bernardino Strait, heading for the American beachheads at Leyte. After reports filtered in alerting Admiral William Halsey Jr. to the danger posed by the remainder of Center Force, he ordered TG 38.2 to head south at full speed to reengage. The task group arrived hours too late to catch the Japanese battleships, which had once more fled in the face of the U.S. fleet. Though Admiral Kurita devastated the escort carrier unit "Taffy 3" (taskforce) on the 25th, through fierce combat the much smaller, thinly armored Taffys had managed to hold off and even force the withdrawal of his warships. The mission of Air Group 18 on the 26th was to locate and destroy the remainder of Center Force as they were escaping back towards the Japanese home islands. Obscuring cloud cover, intense anti-aircraft fire and sheer flight distance contributed to mixed results for the air group. The initial search and subsequent strike located parts of Center Force in the Cuyo East Pass off the western coast of Panay. The bombers of VB-18 seriously damaged a Kongō-class battlecruiser and torpedoed a Nagato-class battleship in addition to doing slight damage to a number of other vessels. A third sortie failed to locate Kurita's forces and returned to Intrepid empty-handed. This was something of a letdown for the pilots of Air Group 18, but they were still proud of their results at Leyte: five strikes against two separate Japanese forces causing serious damage to both, including the sinking of carriers and one of the largest battleships ever constructed.

Though Air Group 18 pilots logged as many as ten hours of flying on the 26th, and to this point had been fighting continuously for almost two months, they received no respite. The men were sent out on strikes against Clark Field on October 29. On Strike 2A, some divisions of VF-18 served as high cover while the remainder operated as fighter-bombers in tandem with the bomber squadrons. As the Hellcats descended to release height, they were intercepted by 15–20 enemy fighters who had been hiding in the overcast to the east of the field. More enemy reinforcements arrived soon after, bringing the total number of Japanese planes to as high as 50. Despite the swarm of enemy airplanes, and moderate anti-aircraft fire, Strike 2A accounted for 12 kills and reported only two pilots lost.

Just before the second strike was set to take off, a flaming Aichi D3A Type 99 Carrier Bomber ("Val") dove on Intrepid. It crashed headlong into Gun Tub #10, immediately killing 10 men and injuring six more. It was the first kamikaze to hit the ship. The damage did not impact the flight deck, though, and it was not long until Strike 2B launched. During this strike, the air group was once again opposed by large numbers of Japanese fighters. VF-18 did "a sterling job" protecting the bombers, destroying 11 enemy planes and accounting for many more damaged and chased away. Not a single Intrepid fighter was lost on this flight.

Harris led one of three groups of fighters on the third strike, Strike 2C. The fighter groups were organized with six planes at high cover (16,000 ft (4,900 m)), three at intermediate cover and four flying low cover. After the bombers made their runs, the low cover team dove to 7,000 ft (2,100 m) to protect the bombers as they left the target site. High cover spotted numerous targets on the ground below, so they descended to replace low cover, strafing parked aircraft as they flew along the length of the complex. This left Harris's intermediate cover division the only one positioned to see three Nakajima Ki-44 ("Tojo") fighters coming in from above the strike group. Before they could surprise the air group, Harris attacked them from 6 o'clock, riddling one plane's cockpit and engine with bullets. This quick kill caused the other two "Tojos" in the division to break off into the clouds. With that threat neutralized, intermediate cover circled the field, finding three more "Tojos" at lower altitude. Approaching from above and behind, Harris shot down his second "Tojo" of the day, and like the first, its companies fled combat. While high and intermediate cover were occupying lower altitudes, dozens of enemy aircraft appeared above the air group. They did not seem interested in the bombers: they went straight after the fighter escort, using superior height to their advantage. Despite solid tactical flying from the Japanese, and an early disadvantage in height for the Americans, the Intrepid fighters claimed at least 10 more enemy aircraft including two more for Harris, bringing his day's total four. Only two of VF-18's Hellcats received minor damage; none were lost.

By day's end, Air Group 18 accounted for 40 enemy aircraft destroyed. Harris was awarded the Navy Cross for playing a central role in the rout of Japanese forces.

==== November ====
Task Group 38.2 remained off the eastern coast of Luzon for the first week of November providing continued support to U.S. Army forces at Leyte. On November 5–6, 1944, Air Group 18 flew sorties against airfields and shipping on southern Luzon. Fighters participated in strafing runs far more often than they engaged in aerial combat. Out of a total of 194 sorties flown by the air group over these two days, two airborne aircraft were destroyed compared with fifty-five on the ground. By this time Japan was reeling from the effects of Operation Cartwheel, which had deprived it of fuel needed to get planes off the ground; its air force was short on experienced and even freshly trained pilots, who were lost in huge numbers in conflicts like the Battle of the Philippine Sea; and finally, it lacked an effective seagoing navy since the back of the IJN had been broken at the Battle of Leyte Gulf the previous month. These factors, in tandem with a week spent refueling, rearming and re-provisioning at Ulithi between November 7 and 14, limited opportunities for Harris to further run up his score.

Intrepid steamed from Ulithi back to the Philippines with orders to strike Nichols and Nielsen airfields, destroy shipping in Manila Bay and to attack concentrations of enemy aircraft encountered between Manila and Batangas. This effort began on November 19. The first strike of the day ran into token resistance from a handful of Zeros, but the enemies did not press home attacks on the bomber squadrons. Instead, VF-18 fighters initiated combat, chasing down and destroying two enemy aircraft. A solitary Zero flying at higher altitude was spotted by Harris, who led his division in pursuit. Harris put holes in the enemy fighter's starboard wing root firing from long range. The Japanese pilot bailed out, but his plane continued flying for four or five minutes with curious Hellcats following in its wake. They eventually shot down the unmanned aircraft. Intrepid went to general quarters a number of times throughout the day's strikes and into the evening as enemy planes tested the perimeter of the task group.

November 25 was VF-18's final strike day as part of Intrepid's air group. An early morning fighter sweep and three strikes were launched against targets on and around Luzon. Cecil Harris flew two sorties: the initial fighter sweep over the island of Luzon itself, and Strike 2C, scheduled to search for enemy cruisers in Balanacan Bay. The fighter sweep was intercepted by over one dozen enemy fighters at Nielson field. In the air battle that ensued, Harris shot down three "Tojos". He took off again around three hours later with Strike 2C. Instead of heading out with the rest of the flight, however, Harris was scheduled to make a message drop on the Hancock. As he approached the carrier, several enemy planes that had penetrated the task group's defensive perimeter began to attack the ship. Harris swung back to Intrepid just in time to see a "Hamp" (also known as "Zero") headed for his ship. Flying through a barrage of anti-aircraft fire, he pursued and shot down the Japanese fighter just off the bow of Intrepid. Two Zeros flying as part of this kamikaze assault on the US fleet successfully crash-dove into the carrier shortly thereafter, striking within five minutes of one another around 13:00 hours. The bombs they carried punched through the flight deck and into the ship, igniting fierce fires and causing severe damage. Air Group 18 pilots returning from strikes had to land on other carriers or fly out to Leyte Island. Days later, VF-18 was detached from the air group and moved to the Hancock, where they briefly served before being rotated out of the combat zone.

== Post-war ==
As a member of the United States Naval Reserve, Cecil Harris's commission ended with the War. Upon returning home he picked up where he left off previously, completing his undergraduate degree at Northern State Teachers College. He began teaching at Cresbard High School where he functioned variously as principal, coach and teacher. He was also engaged to Eva at this time.

Harris was recalled from reserve status to active duty with the outbreak of the Korean War in 1950. On October 15, 1951, Harris reported to NAS Memphis for a two-month pilot refresher training before being assigned to NAS Pensacola for flight duty. Following this post, Harris served in the Air Warfare Division of the Office of the Chief of Naval Operations (OpNav) at The Pentagon, and after the Korean War he moved through a number of positions at different Naval Air Stations. He ultimately attained the rank of captain and finished out his career in the Navy back at OpNav, this time as Head of the Aviation Periodicals and History Office. Harris retired on July 1, 1967.

=== Death ===
Harris was driving his truck home on the evening of December 1, 1981, when he was pulled over by police. Though no bottles or cans were reportedly found in the vehicle, a Breathalyzer test returned a blood alcohol reading of .16%, leading to his arrest. Harris told an arresting officer at the scene that "if he failed the test, that was the end of his life." Family members went to the Groveton, Virginia jail where Harris was being held and attempted to have him released into their custody. Their request was denied by a local magistrate. Just past midnight on December 2 Cecil Harris was found dead in his cell, apparently having hanged himself in the interim. It was his 65th birthday.

== Awards and decorations ==
Harris received the following decorations:

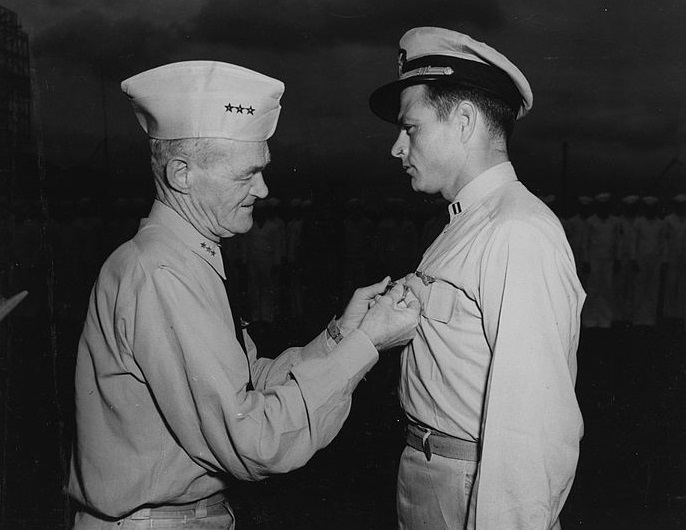
Vice Adimral Marc A. Mitscher presents the Navy Cross, Silver Star, Distinguished Flying Cross, and Gold Star in lieu of a second DFC to Lieutenant Cecil E. Harris on January 17, 1945

Naval Aviator insignia
| Navy Cross | | Silver Star |
| Distinguished Flying Cross | Air Medal | Presidential Unit Citation |
| Naval Reserve Medal | American Defense Service Medal | American Campaign Medal |
| European–African–Middle Eastern Campaign Medal | Asiatic–Pacific Campaign Medal | World War II Victory Medal |
| National Defense Service Medal | Philippine Liberation Medal | Presidential Unit Citation (Philippines) |

=== Navy Cross citation ===

Lieutenant Cecil Elwood Harris
U.S. Navy
Date Of Action: October 29, 1944

The President of the United States of America takes pleasure in presenting the Navy Cross to Lieutenant Cecil Elwood Harris, United States Naval Reserve, for extraordinary heroism in operations against the enemy while serving as Pilot of a carrier-based Navy Fighter Plane in Fighting Squadron Eighteen (VF-18), attached to the USS Intrepid (CV-11), in action against enemy Japanese forces on Luzon, Philippine Islands, on 29 October 1944. Quick to intercept two successive flights of Japanese fighter planes preparing to attack our bomber and torpedo squadrons as they completed a strike on Clark Field, Lieutenant Harris boldly led his Division in a swift assault on the enemy planes. Skillfully and daringly maneuvering among the hostile formations, he shot down one enemy plane from each flight and put the others to rout. Quick to intercept a superior force of enemy fighters descending in waves in furious attempts to wipe out our fighter protection, he dauntlessly engaged in the fierce dog fight which ensued. Successively knocking down two enemy planes closing two of our Hellcats whose pilots were unaware of their imminent peril, he effectively averted the certain destruction of these friendly planes and assisted essentially in the utter defeat of the entire enemy formation without the loss of any of our planes from enemy action. By his courageous initiative, superb airmanship and fearless devotion to the fulfillment of a hazardous mission, Lieutenant Harris contributed materially to the success of our operations in this strategic area, and his personal valor in the face of grave peril upheld the highest traditions of the United States Naval Service.

== Recognition ==
On May 25, 2009, a segment of Highway 20 in South Dakota was designated the Cecil Harris Memorial Highway. Senators Johnson and Thune read their remembrances of Harris into the U.S. Congressional Record to mark the occasion. In 2014, a statue of Harris was dedicated on the grounds of his alma mater, Northern State University. There is also a place dedicated to Cecil E. Harris and all of the veterans of Cresbard, SD, at the Cresbard community center.

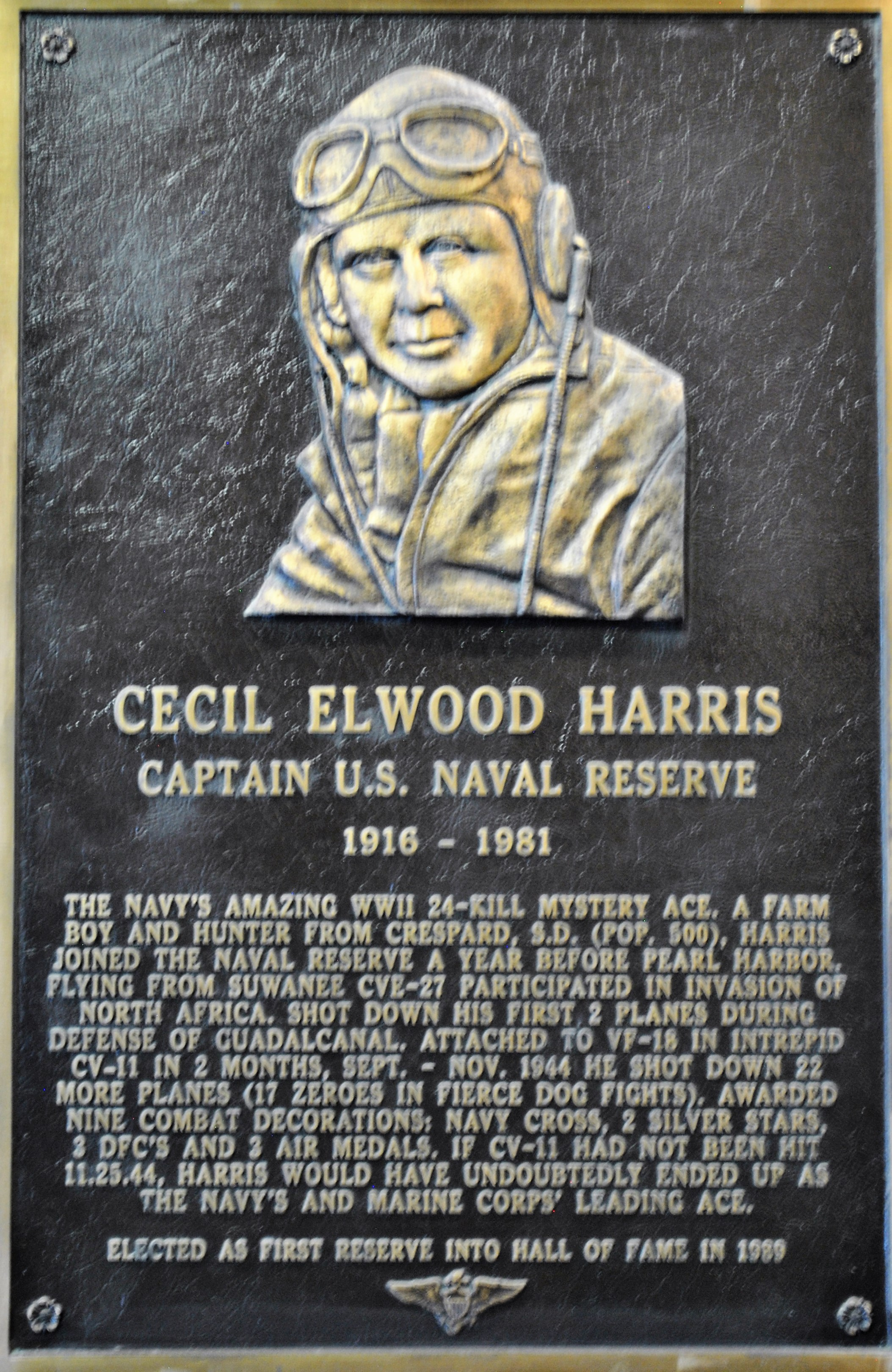
Cecil Harris's commemorative plaque aboard USS Yorktown

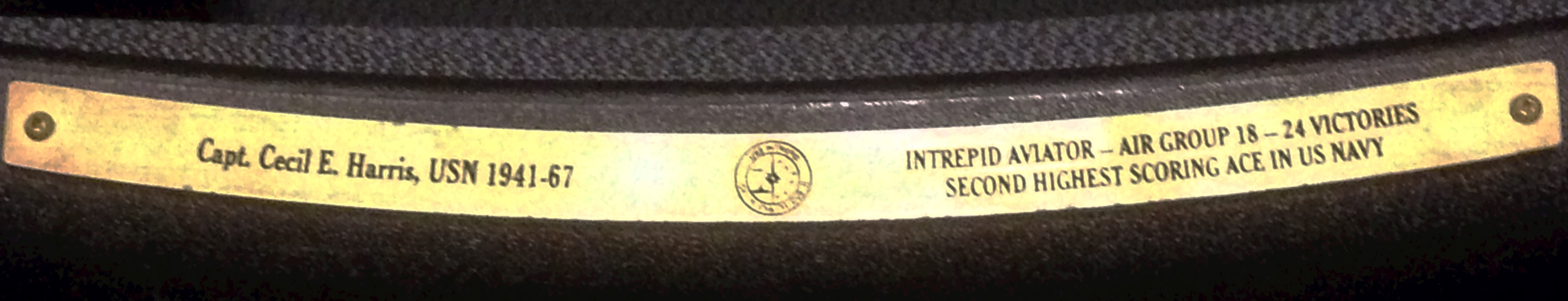
Cecil Harris's Seat of Honor in the Intrepid Museum's Lutnick Theater
