= Wear (surname) =

Wear is a surname. Notable people with the name include:

- Arthur Wear (1880-1918), American tennis player
- David Wear (born 1990), American basketball player
- Joseph Wear (1876-1941), American tennis player
- Maud Marian Wear (1873–1955), English artist
- Peter Wear (born 1949), Australian journalist
- Sylvanus Wear (1858-1920), English naturalist
- Travis Wear (born 1990), American basketball player

== See also ==
- Ware (surname)
