= John Ware =

John Ware may refer to:

- John Ware (cowboy) (1845-1905), Canadian cowboy and rancher in pre-Confederation Alberta and originally from the United States
- John Ware (TV journalist), BBC journalist
- John Ware (cricketer), 19th-century athlete
- John Ware (city manager) (1948 – 2010), city manager for Dallas, Texas
- John H. Ware III (1908–1997), Republican member of the U.S. House of Representatives from Pennsylvania
- John Ware (musician), drummer with First National Band
- John Ware (physician) (1795–1864), American physician and professor of medicine
