= VF-71 (1942–1959) =

Fighting Squadron 71
- Active: 15 October 1942 – 31 March 1959
- Country: United States
- Branch: United States Navy
- Role: Fighter aircraft
- Part of: Inactive
- Engagements: Korean War

Aircraft flown
- Fighter: F9F-2 Panther; F2H-4 Banshee

Fighting Squadron 71 or VF-71 was an aviation unit of the United States Navy. Originally established as VGS-18 on 15 October 1942, it was redesignated VC-18 on 1 March 1943, redesignated as VF-36 on 15 August 1943, redesignated as VF-18 on 5 March 1944, redesignated as VF-7A on 15 November 1946, redesignated as VF-71 on 28 July 1948 and disestablished on 31 March 1959.

== Operational history ==
=== VGS-18 ===
Escort-Scouting Squadron 18 was established on 15 October 1942. It first operated out of NAS Seattle before moving to NAS Whidbey Island in December 1942. There it was temporarily attached to Air Wing Six for instruction.

=== VC-18 ===
Beginning 1 March 1943, the US Navy changed its squadron designations. Among these changes, Escort-Scouting (VGS) squadrons were redesignated Composite (VC) squadrons. The squadron also relocated in March, transferring from Whidbey Island to NAS San Diego. Instruction in carrier operations continued at this time including torpedo bombing practice with the Grumman TBF Avenger.

=== VF-36 ===
By 20 November 1943, the relatively new VF-36 squadron completed carrier qualification aboard USS Copahee. Fighting 36 joined up with Air Group 18 in February 1944 and changed its designation to VF-18, the previous fighter squadron having been detached and its pilots transferred to other squadrons.

=== VF-18 ===
The squadron embarked aboard USS Intrepid after significant delays. Repairs to the ship's damaged rudder took longer than expected and additional mechanical problems developed as soon as it left Pearl Harbor on 28 July 1944. The squadron's combat cruise aboard Intrepid also ended prematurely. On 25 November 1944 two successive Kamikaze attacks caused extensive damage to the ship, requiring it to leave the combat zone for repairs. Because of these occurrences, VF-18 only conducted strikes aboard Intrepid from the period 6 September – 25 November 1944. They briefly served aboard USS Hancock afterward.

In spite of their short tour of duty, "Two-a-Day 18" was credited with 172 enemy planes shot down and produced a number of ace pilots including the high-scoring Cecil E. Harris. The squadron participated in one of the last major air battles against Japanese aviators during strikes against Japanese-held Formosa on 12 October 1944, and along with the rest of their air group were the first pilots to strike at Admiral Takeo Kurita's Center Force in the Battle of Leyte Gulf.

=== VF-71 ===
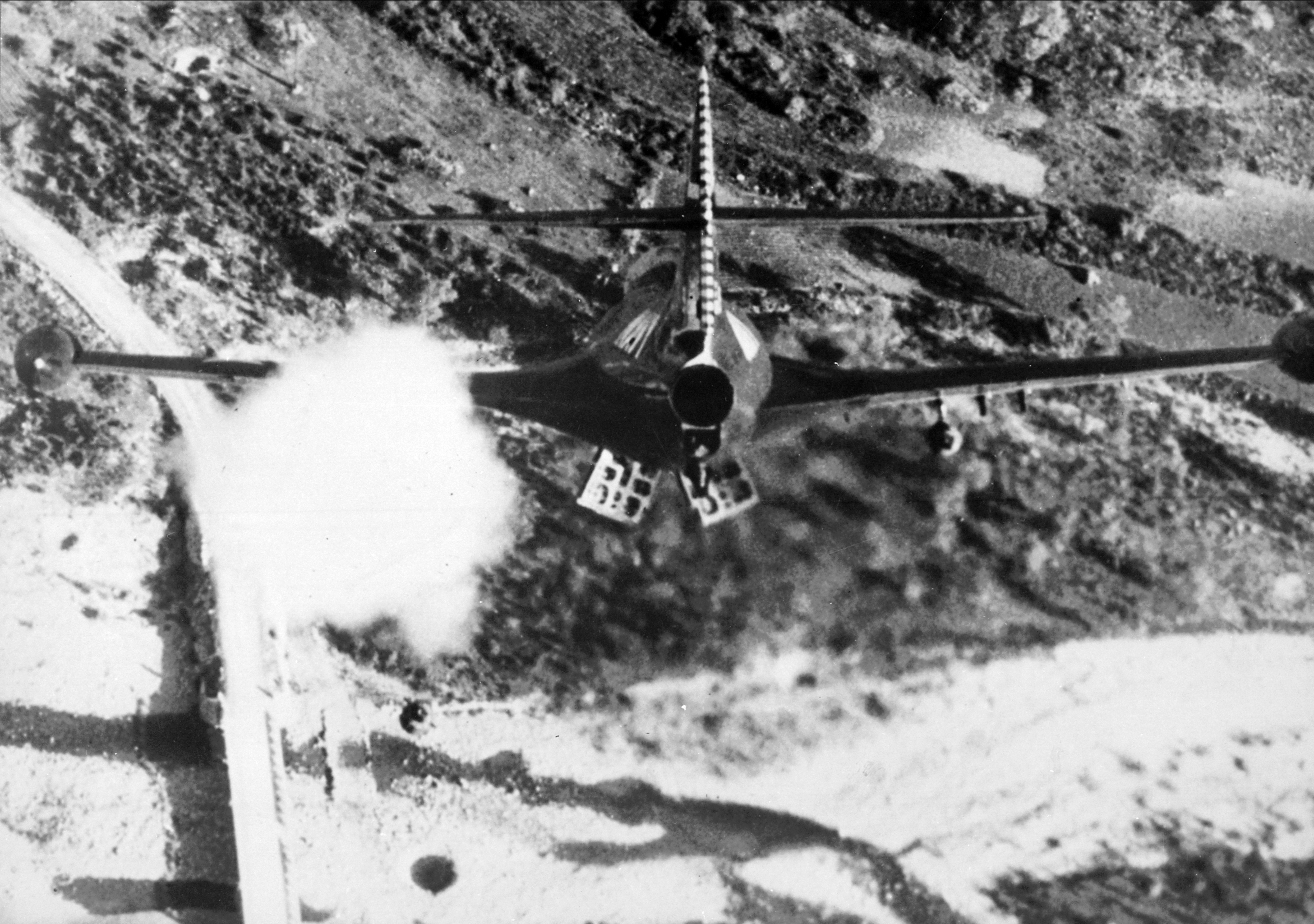
VF-71 F9F-2 attacks a bridge in Korea in November 1952

VF-71 was assigned to Carrier Air Group Seven (CVG-7) aboard USS Bon Homme Richard, which was deployed to Korea from 20 May 1952 to 8 January 1953. During this deployment VF-71 participated in the Attack on the Sui-ho Dam from 23–7 June 1952.

While embarked on USS Intrepid as part of Carrier Air Group Six VF-71 participated in Operation Strikeback from 3–12 September 1957.

VF-71 was embarked on the USS Randolph for a Mediterranean deployment from 2 September 1958 to 12 March 1959.

== Home port assignments ==
- NAS Quonset Point
- NAS Oceana

== Aircraft assignment ==
- F9F-2 Panther
- F2H-4 Banshee

== See also ==
- History of the United States Navy
- List of inactive United States Navy aircraft squadrons
- List of United States Navy aircraft squadrons
