= Jim Ware (hurler) =

Waterford hurler

Personal information
- Native name: Séamus Mac an Mhaoir (Irish)
- Born: 23 February 1908 Gurranabraher, Cork, Ireland
- Died: 18 July 1983 (aged 75) Ardkeen Hospital, Waterford, Ireland
- Occupation: Bookbinder
- Height: 6 ft 1 in (185 cm)

Sport
- Sport: Hurling
- Position: Goalkeeper
Club
- Years: Club
- Erin’s Own
Club titles
- Waterford titles: 12
Inter-county
- Years: County
- 1927–1949: Waterford
Inter-county titles
- Munster titles: 1
- All-Irelands: 1
- NHL: 0

James Patrick Ware (23 February 1908 – 18 July 1983) was an Irish hurler. At club level he played for Erin's Own, captaining the club on a number of occasions, and was the captain of the Waterford senior hurling team that won the 1948 All-Ireland Championship.

Widely regarded as one of the Erin's Own club's all-time greats, Ware's career lasted for over twenty years. During that time he won 12 Waterford Senior Championship medals, including a record nine championships in-a-row between 1927 and 1935.

Ware made his first appearance for the Waterford senior hurling team during the 1927 Munster Championship and enjoyed his greatest successes as a goalkeeper over the following two decades. In 1948, at the age of 40, he became the oldest player to lift the Liam MacCarthy Cup when Waterford won their first All-Ireland Championship, having earlier captained the team to the Munster Championship title. Ware was selected as goalkeeper on the Waterford Hurling Team of the Century in 1984.

Ware's brother, Charlie, played on the first Waterford team to reach an All-Ireland final in 1938, while his nephew, also called Charlie, was a substitute on the Waterford team that won the 1959 All-Ireland Championship.

== Early life ==
James Patrick Ware was born on 23 February 1908, at 84 Barrett's Buildings in Gurranabraher on the northside of Cork, to Mary (Murphy) Ware (1875-1937) and Charles Ware (1869-1947), a shoemaker. Both his parents were Corkonians; however, the family moved to Waterford shortly after Ware's birth. He was educated at the De La Salle College.

== Playing career ==
=== Erin's Own ===
In 1924, Ware joined the newly established Erin's Own club. Just four years later, he was goalkeeper on the Erin's Own team that won their first Waterford Senior Championship after an 8–02 to 0–05 defeat of reigning champions Dungarvan. It was the first of nine consecutive championship titles for the club, with Ware lining out in goal for all the subsequent victories over Tallow (1928, 1931, 1932, 1934, 1935), Lismore (1929), Dungarvan (1930) and Dunhill (1933).

Ware won his 10th championship medal, after a lapse of seven years, on 18 October 1942 after a defeat of Lismore in the final.

Ware ended his club career by winning back-to-back championship title in 1946 and 1947 after defeats of Brickey Rangers and Clonea.

=== Waterford ===
Ware made his first championship appearance for Waterford on 29 May 1927 in a Munster Championship semi-final against Clare. After one of the forward missed a last-minute goal chance to equalise the game, Waterford lost by 8–01 to 6-05.

On 11 August 1929, Ware lined out in goal in his first Munster Championship final. Cork were the opponents and, in spite of having home advantage, Waterford were still defeated by 4–06 to 2-03. It was the first of five Munster final defeats for Ware.

Ware captained Waterford for the first time on 13 June 1943 in a Munster Championship first round defeat of Tipperary at Fraher Field. He was reappointed captain of the team for the 1947 and 1948 championship campaigns.

On 1 August 1948, Ware won his only Munster Championship medal when Waterford defeated reigning champions Cork by 4–07 to 3–09 in the final at Thurles Sportsfield. He came in for individual praise after making a number of spectacular saves. On 5 September 1948, Ware became the first Waterford player and the oldest player to lift the Liam MacCarthy Cup after a 6–07 to 4–02 defeat of Dublin in the All-Ireland final.

Ware played his last game for Waterford on 12 June 1949 in a 3–08 to 3-03 Munster Championship semi-final defeat by Limerick.

=== Munster ===
At the age of 35, Ware was first selected as goalkeeper for the Munster inter-provincial team. On 17 March 1944, he won his first Railway Cup medal after a 4–10 to 4–04 defeat of Connacht in the final at Croke Park. A year later, Ware won a second successive Railway Cup medal after a 6–08 to 2–00 defeat of Ulster.

In 1949, Ware was appointed captain of the Munster team. He won his third and final Railway Cup medal on 17 March 1949 after a 5–03 to 2–09 defeat of Connacht.

== Personal life ==
Ware married Alice O'Donnell (28 April 1912 - 8 June 1998), a poet and playwright, at the Cathedral of the Most Holy Trinity in Waterford on 24 September 1938. They had three daughters — Colette, Christine and Catherine. Ware worked as a bookbinder at Harvey's for nearly 55 years until his retirement in 1978.

Ware died at Ardkeen Hospital in Waterford on 18 July 1983.

== Honours ==
Erin's Own

- Waterford Senior Hurling Championship (12): 1927, 1928, 1929, 1930, 1931, 1932, 1933, 1934, 1935, 1942, 1946, 1947

Waterford

- All-Ireland Senior Hurling Championship (1): 1948 (c)
- Munster Senior Hurling Championship (1): 1948 (c)

Munster

- Railway Cup (3): 1944, 1945, 1949 (c)

Sporting positions
Preceded by	Waterford Senior Hurling Captain; 1943	Succeeded by
Preceded by	Waterford Senior Hurling Captain; 1947–1948	Succeeded by John Keane
Preceded by Willie Murphy	Munster Hurling Captain; 1949	Succeeded by Pat Stakelum
Achievements
Preceded by Dan Kennedy	All-Ireland SHC winning captain 1948	Succeeded by Pat Stakelum
Preceded by Willie Murphy	Railway Cup Hurling Final winning captain 1949	Succeeded by Pat Stakelum
