= Henry Ware =

Henry Ware may refer to:

- Henry Ware (Unitarian) (1764–1845), American preacher and theologian
- Henry Ware Jr. (1794–1843), Unitarian theologian, son of the above
- Henry Ware (bishop of Chichester) (died 1420), bishop of Chichester
- Henry Ware (bishop of Barrow-in-Furness) (1830–1909), suffragan bishop from 1889 to 1909
- Sir Henry Ware (lawyer) (1912–1989), British lawyer and government official

== See also ==
- Henry Ware Eliot (1843–1919), American industrialist
