= Jeff Ware =

Jeff or Geoffrey Ware may refer to:

- Jeff Ware (baseball) (born 1970), American former Major League Baseball pitcher
- Jeff Ware (ice hockey) (born 1977), Canadian former National Hockey League defenceman
- Geoffrey Ware, character in The Silver King
