= USS Charles R. Ware (DE-547) =

History

United States
- Name: USS Charles R. Ware
- Namesake: Lieutenant Charles R. Ware (1911-1942), a U.S. Navy officer and Navy Cross recipient
- Builder: Boston Navy Yard, Boston, Massachusetts (proposed)
- Laid down: Never
- Fate: Construction contract cancelled 1944

General characteristics
- Class & type: John C. Butler-class destroyer escort
- Displacement: 1,350 tons
- Length: 306 ft (93 m)
- Beam: 36 ft 8 in (11 m)
- Draft: 9 ft 5 in (3 m)
- Propulsion: 2 boilers, 2 geared turbine engines, 12,000 shp; 2 propellers
- Speed: 24 knots (44 km/h)
- Range: 6,000 nmi. (12,000 km) @ 12 kt
- Complement: 14 officers, 201 enlisted
- Armament: 2 × single 5 in (127 mm) guns; 2 × twin 40 mm (1.6 in) AA guns; 10 × single 20 mm (0.79 in) AA guns; 1 × triple 21 in (533 mm) torpedo tubes; 8 × depth charge throwers; 1 × Hedgehog ASW mortar; 2 × depth charge racks

USS Charles R. Ware (DE-547) was a proposed World War II United States Navy John C. Butler-class destroyer escort that was never built.

Charles R. Ware was planned to be built at the Boston Navy Yard in Boston, Massachusetts. Her construction contract was cancelled in 1944 before her construction could begin.

The name Charles R. Ware was reassigned to the destroyer USS Charles R. Ware (DD-865).
