= Tommy Ware =

English footballer

Personal information
- Full name: Thomas Ware
- Date of birth: 16 October 1885
- Place of birth: Bristol, England
- Date of death: 1 May 1915 (aged 29)
- Place of death: Poperinghe, Belgium
- Position: Goalkeeper

Senior career*
Years	Team	Apps	(Gls)
1911–1915	Bristol City	51	(0)
- * Club domestic league appearances and goals

Thomas Ware (16 October 1885 – 1 May 1915) was an English professional footballer who played in the Football League for Bristol City as a goalkeeper.

== Personal life ==
Prior to being bought out of the British Army to become a professional footballer, Ware served as a musician in the Cameronians (Scottish Rifles). Though discharged, he remained on the reserve list. He combined his football career with a factory job in Broadmead. Ware re-enlisted in the army upon the outbreak of the First World War in 1914 and enlisted as a gunner in the Royal Field Artillery. He died in Poperinge of wounds incurred during the Second Battle of Ypres on 1 May 1915, and was buried in Poperinge Old Military Cemetery.
