= Charlie Ware (Baker County, Georgia) =

Shooting victim

Charles Ware (May 4, 1914 – March 10, 1999) was an African-American field hand in Baker County, Georgia whose shooting by a sheriff was a major turning point in the treatment of black Americans in that county.

== Early life ==
Ware was born in Baker County, Georgia to Zeddie Ware and Willie Mae (Kegler) Jenkins, who were both born in Georgia. His father died when Charlie was young. In 1920, he was living with his widowed mother and three siblings, John, Zeddie and Mary Lou, at their maternal grandparents' farm in rural Milford. He, his mother and grandmother were recorded as being "mulatto." In 1930, he may have been the 16-year-old Charlie Ware imprisoned at the "Industrial Farm for Colored Males" in Adamsville, where boys as young as 10 were incarcerated. In 1940, he was living in Micanopy, Florida and working at the Franklin Lumber & Basket Co. He was recorded as a slight man at only 5'5" and 134 lbs.

== July 4, 1961 shooting ==
On July 4, 1961, Ware was at a barbecue at Ichauway Plantation, Hoggards Mill, Baker County, owned by Coca-Cola Board Chairman Robert W. Woodruff. During the festivities, Ware allegedly flirted with the African-American mistress of the white overseer of the plantation. The overseer complained about this to his friend L. Warren Johnson, the white sheriff of Baker County.

Sheriff Johnson that night went to the Ware home, where he beat his wife, Louise Ware, and forced Ware out of bed. Warren arrested him and handcuffed him, and forced Ware to recite the 23rd Psalm before driving him to the county jail. He then made a claim over the radio of an attempted knife attack — "[He's] coming on me with a knife. I'm going to shoot him!" — before shooting the handcuffed Ware four times. Ware was shot three times in the neck but survived.

Ware was later indicted by a Baker County grand jury on charges of felonious assault. His lawyer, C. B. King, then filed a $100,000 civil suit in federal court, alleging that Johnson's story was preposterous and that he had shot Ware with no provocation. In the spring of 1963, the all-white jury deliberated for less than 90 minutes before exonerating the sheriff. Later, the black community successfully organized a boycott of a grocery store owned by one of the jurors, forcing him out of business.

When Ware's criminal case was brought to trial in July 1963, additional charges of drunkenness on the part of Ware at both the barbecue and on a public highway were included. Ware was found guilty by the jury, but they recommended a lenient sentence. By the time of this trial, Donald L. Hallowell had also become one of Ware's lawyers. He used the trial to challenge the exclusion of African-Americans from serving on Baker County juries.

== Death ==
Ware later moved to Albany, Georgia, where he died at Phoebe Putney Memorial Hospital at aged 84 following multiple strokes. He was survived by his wife, Louise, two daughters and 13 sons.

== See also ==
- Albany Movement
