= John Ware (physician) =

American physician and academic (1795–1864)

John Ware FAAAS
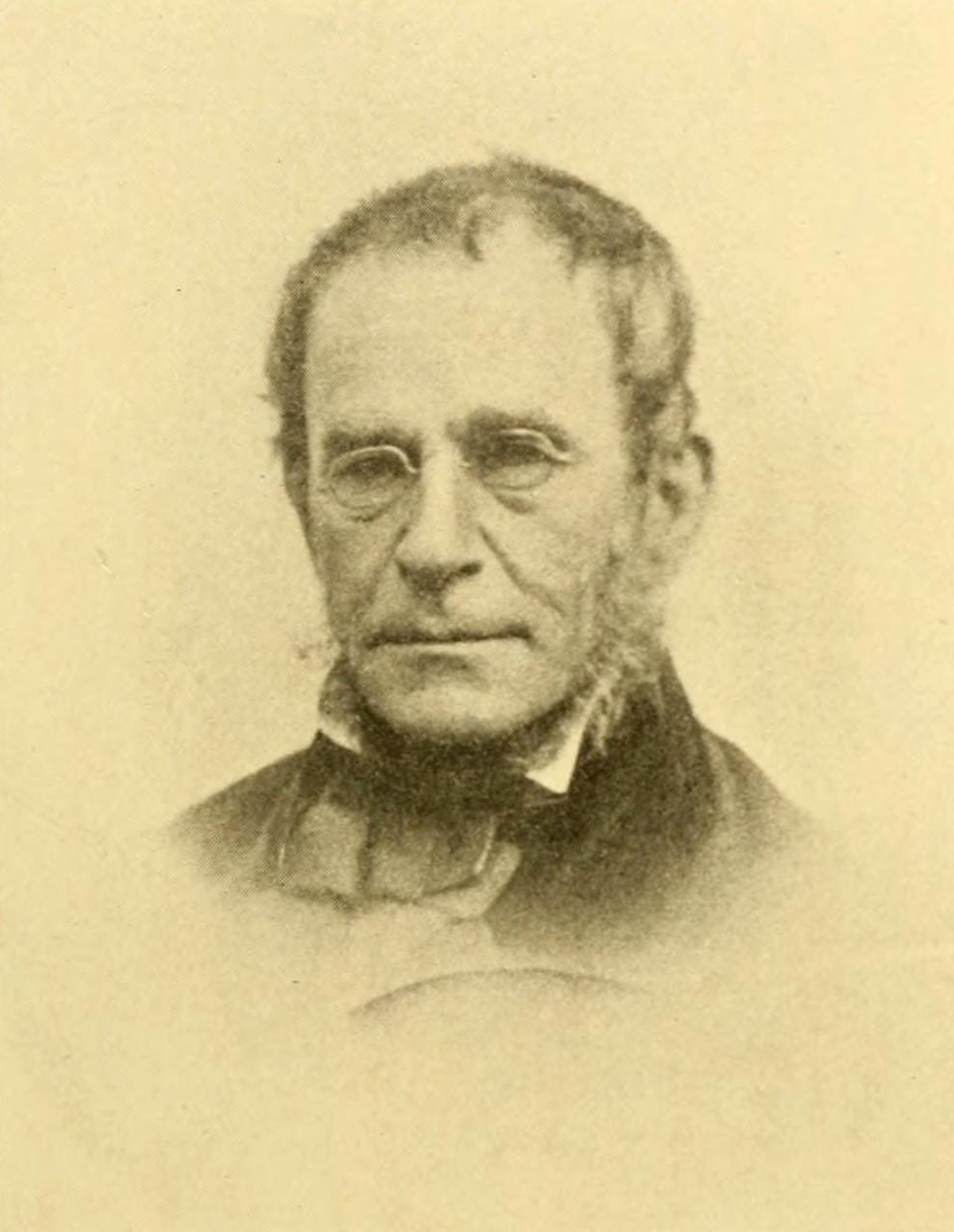
- Born: December 19, 1795; Hingham, Massachusetts, U.S.
- Died: April 29, 1864 (aged 68); Boston, Massachusetts, U.S.
- Education: Harvard College (1813); Harvard Medical School M.D. (1816)
- Occupation: Physician
- Known for: Founding member of the Boston Society of Natural History
- Spouse: Helen Lincoln (m. 1822)
- Father: Henry Ware

John Ware (December 19, 1795 – April 29, 1864) was an American medical doctor, college professor, and editor. He was a professor at Harvard University from 1832 to 1858. He was a founding member of the Boston Society of Natural History and fellow of the American Academy of Arts and Sciences.

== Early life ==
John Ware was born December 19, 1795, in Hingham, Massachusetts. He was the second son of the Unitarian theologian Henry Ware.

He graduated from Harvard College in 1813. He studied medicine at Harvard Medical School, graduating with M.D. in 1816.

== Career ==
After graduating from medical school, Ware practiced medicine in Duxbury, Massachusetts. In 1832, he was appointed professor in the theory and practice of medicine in Harvard College's Medical Department and held the professorship until 1858.

In 1828, Ware was one of the editors of The New England Journal of Medicine. In 1828, he also became the first editor of the Boston Medical and Surgical Journal. He was one of the founding members of the Boston Society for Medical Improvement in 1828 and of the Boston Society of Natural History in 1830.

He was elected a fellow of the American Academy of Arts and Sciences in 1823.

== Personal life ==
In 1817, Ware moved to Boston, where he resided for the rest of his life. He married Helen Lincoln (1798–1858) in 1822. Her father was physician Levi Lincoln, a fifth cousin of Abraham Lincoln. They had three daughters and two sons; the first son died in infancy.

Ware died April 29, 1864, in Boston, Massachusetts.

== Selected publications ==
- Ware, John (1820). "Some Account of the Late Experiments on Syphilis, with Remarks on the Nature and Treatment of Venereal Diseases". The New England Journal of Medicine, Surgery and Collateral Branches of Science. 9 (4): 354–370. doi:10.1056/NEJM182010010090410.
- —— (1823). "Remarks upon the Study of Pathology; Being Part of an Address Delivered before the Boylston Medical Society, November, 1821". The New England Journal of Medicine, Surgery and Collateral Branches of Science. 12 (4): 337–344. doi:10.1056/NEJM182310010120401.
- —— (1825). "Account of Some Puerperal Cases, Which Occurred at the Boston Almshouse during the Winter of 1823–24". The New England Journal of Medicine, Surgery and Collateral Branches of Science. 14: 13–20. doi:10.1056/NEJM182501010140102.
- —— (1827). "Miscellaneous Observations on Purgative Medicines, and on Costiveness". The New England Medical Review and Journal. 16: 81–99. doi:10.1056/NEJM182701010160104.
- —— (1830). "ART. XVI. Case of Sea-sickness terminating in a singular affection of the Mind". The American Journal of the Medical Sciences. 10: 379–384. doi:10.1097/00000441-183002000-00015. S2CID 72607941.
- —— (1832). "Remarks on the History and Treatment of Delirium Tremens". The London Medical and Physical Journal. 12 (70): 280–291. PMC 5679877. PMID 30495597.
- —— (1833). "Rupture of the Aorta within the Pericardium". The Boston Medical and Surgical Journal. 8 (7): 103–105. doi:10.1056/NEJM183303270080702.
- —— (1838). "On the Treatment of Delirium Tremens". The Boston Medical and Surgical Journal. 18 (11): 165–168. doi:10.1056/NEJM183804180181101.
- Warren, John C.; Bigelow, Jacob; Shattuck, Geo. C.; Hayward, Geo.; —— (1849). "Cholera Report". The Boston Medical and Surgical Journal. 39 (23): 451–454. doi:10.1056/NEJM184901030392302.
- —— (1850). "On Croup". The Boston Medical and Surgical Journal. 42 (12): 233–246. doi:10.1056/NEJM185004240421202.
- —— (1851). "Success in the Medical Profession". The Boston Medical and Surgical Journal. 43 (25): 496–504. doi:10.1056/NEJM185101220432504.
- —— (1855). "Cases of Albuminuria Occurring after Scarlatina, with Remarks". The Boston Medical and Surgical Journal. 53 (5): 92–99. doi:10.1056/NEJM185508300530502.
- —— (1861). "Dr. Ware's Lectures on General Therapeutics". The Boston Medical and Surgical Journal. 63 (25): 489–497. doi:10.1056/NEJM186101170632501.
