= James Britton Ware =

American politician (1830–1918)

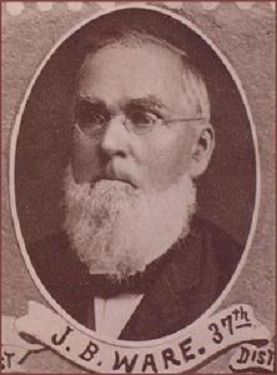
Senator James Britton Ware

Senator James Britton Ware (1830–1918) was a member of the Georgia Senate from Georgia's 37th District between 1904 and 1905, in the Democratic political party. He was born on June 16, 1830, in Heard County, Georgia and died on January 30, 1918, in Heard County, Georgia.

== Early life ==
James Britton (J.B.) Ware was born to John Mims Ware and Lucy Sturdivant, and his father died when he was 8 years old. On October 11, 1849, at age 19, he married Sarah Margaret Tabitha Simms, she was 16 years old, at the Bethel Baptist Church in Heard County, Georgia. Sarah Simms was the daughter of John Simms and Comfort Maddox Grace. Comfort was born March 26, 1798, and married September 16, 1816 in Hancock, Georgia, she was the daughter of Thomas Grace and Sarah "Sally" Maddox.

On October 28, 1850, they purchased 202-1/2 acres from a neighbor, Thomas H. Hanson, and built their home. His superior abilities as a man of affairs being quickly recognized by his fellow citizens, he was elected Justice of the Peace at 21, serving eight years. In 1859 and 1860 he was elected to represent Heard County, Georgia in the general assembly.

During the Civil War in 1863 James raised a company of seventy men, of which he was elected Captain of the State Guards. It became Company G, of Colonial Wilcoxon's regiment of state troops and General Iverson's Brigade, which took part in several skirmishes near Rome, Georgia. The decision to leave his family was hard because it meant leaving behind his wife and six small children, their ages being 10, 8, 6, 4, 2 and a newborn. His wife, Sarah, would be left alone to administer to all the needs of a large family and a large farm. He left with a heavy heart, to join the war effort.

In 1864 he enlisted in the confederate service, in which he continued rendering valuable service until the surrender. During the Battle of Atlanta and Sherman's march, the Ware home served as a refuge for relatives and friends in the Atlanta area. During the "unpleasantness" he gave up his business and devoted money, time and labor to caring for the families of the soldiers, a noble service on his part which they never forgot, and were always ready to express their gratitude. Among his brothers who entered the war, only David and James returned home, his brother, John, Jr., left behind a wife, a small son.

After his mother's death in 1869, James purchased the family home from his siblings, and successfully managed his estate over the next 10 years. In 1872 he was incorporated in the Jury Commissioner's Bill and served continuously until 1904. In 1874 he was elected to the Georgia Legislature receiving 500 of the 700 votes cast, working in both the House and Senate.

In 1904 James was elected State Senator of the 37th District. While in the Senate he introduced and secured the passage of a bill making drunkenness on the public highway a crime, as well as introducing and having enacted the bill forbidding the sale of whiskey in Georgia within the radius of one mile from a church. He served as foreman of the grand jury over 21 times. He was also Treasurer of the Western Baptist Association, and President of the Corinth Agricultural and Horticultural Club.

July 20, 1906, Resolved, That the Senate learns with regret of illness of the venerable Senator from the 37th district. James B. Ware, and trust that he will soon be restored to health and his place in the Senate. To the surprise of the state senate Senator J. B. Ware appeared yesterday and took his seat. He was reported to be down and out for the session on account of ill health. Although not well, the senator thinks that he will be able to remain with the body during the remainder of the present session.

== Family and death ==
Senator James B. Ware and Sarah Margaret Tabitha Simms Ware had the following children: (2)

1. Alberta Virginia "Ginnie" Ware, 3/8/1851-7/28/1923 married Walter G. Orr;
2. Almira Elizabeth "Poss" Ware, 5/21/1853-2/5/1940 never married;
3. Adeline Glenn "Ade" Ware, 5/17/1855-2/14/1914 married George T. Snow;
4. John Fletcher Ware, 9/12/1857-11/20/1922 married 1. Lula Walker and 2. Eula Adamson;
5. Alonzo Crawford Ware, 12/17/1859 - 1/18/1943 married Sarah Kendrick;
6. Albert Zollicoffer "Zol” Ware, 12/15/1860- c1943 married Annie Walker (Lula's sister);
7. James Britton Ware, Jr., 5/21/1864 – 12/24/1883;
8. Henry Hall Ware, 8/28/1866 married Emma Allen on 11/30/1893;
9. Robert Houston Thomas Ware, 6/18/1868- After 1943 married Julia Valena Davis 1890;
10. Rigdon Mims "Rig" Ware, 11/20/1870-10/1964 married Emily Virginia Shackleford.

Before his death he wrote the following words, "Nothing can give me more consolation in my old age than to see the people of my county obedient and submissive to the will of God which the Scriptures say is the beginning of his love. Oh, what days of rejoicing will be with the good people when the bottle and the pistol toter become a thing of the past."

At a reunion he said, "during my life, I set out to make a useful man of myself, and take such position in life that would make life worth living. My highest ambition in life was to raise my children to be men and women of integrity and dignity, these principles being the foundations of all greatness. To what extent I have instilled these principles into the minds of my children, I leave to my neighbors and to the public to decide. I admonished all my grandchildren, and their children to improve upon their parents." He finished by saying that this day was a happy reunion day, but his prayer was that the world all live so that when death comes, we would meet again for a happy reunion in heaven. At his death at age 87, he had 40 grandchildren and 41 great grandchildren, and was one of Heard County's leading citizens. This home recently burned to the ground during a lightning storm and nothing was saved.
