= Charlie Ware (hurler, born 1933) =

Irish hurler

Personal information
- Native name: Cathal Mac an Mhaoir (Irish)
- Nickname: Young Charlie
- Born: 1933 Waterford, Ireland
- Died: 24 November 2013 (aged 80) Waterford, Ireland
- Occupation: Printer

Sport
- Sport: Hurling
- Position: Right wing-forward
Club
- Years: Club
- Erin's Own
Club titles
- Waterford titles: 1
Inter-county*
Years	County	Apps (scores)
1955-1963	Waterford	7 (2-1)
Inter-county titles
- Munster titles: 1
- All-Irelands: 0
- NHL: 0
- *Inter County team apps and scores correct as of 21:55, 7 January 2013.

Charles Ware (1933 – 24 November 2013) was an Irish hurler who played as a right wing-forward for the Waterford senior team.

Born in Waterford, Ware first played competitive hurling during his schooldays at De La Salle College. He arrived on the inter-county scene at the age of twenty-one when he made his senior debut in the 1954-55 National Hurling League. Ware went on to play for Waterford for much of the next decade and won one All-Ireland medal as a non-playing substitute and one Munster medals.

At club level Ware won one championship medal with Erin's Own.

His retirement came following Waterford's defeat by Kilkenny in the 1963 championship.

Ware's father, Charlie, and his uncle, Jim, also had inter-county hurling careers with Waterford.

== Honours ==
=== Team ===
Erin's Own

- Waterford Senior Hurling Championship (1): 1962

Waterford

- All-Ireland Senior Hurling Championship (1): 1959 (sub)
- Munster Senior Hurling Championship (2): 1959, 1963 (sub)
- National Hurling League (1): 1962-63 (sub)
