= USS Charles R. Ware (DD-865) =

Gearing-class destroyer

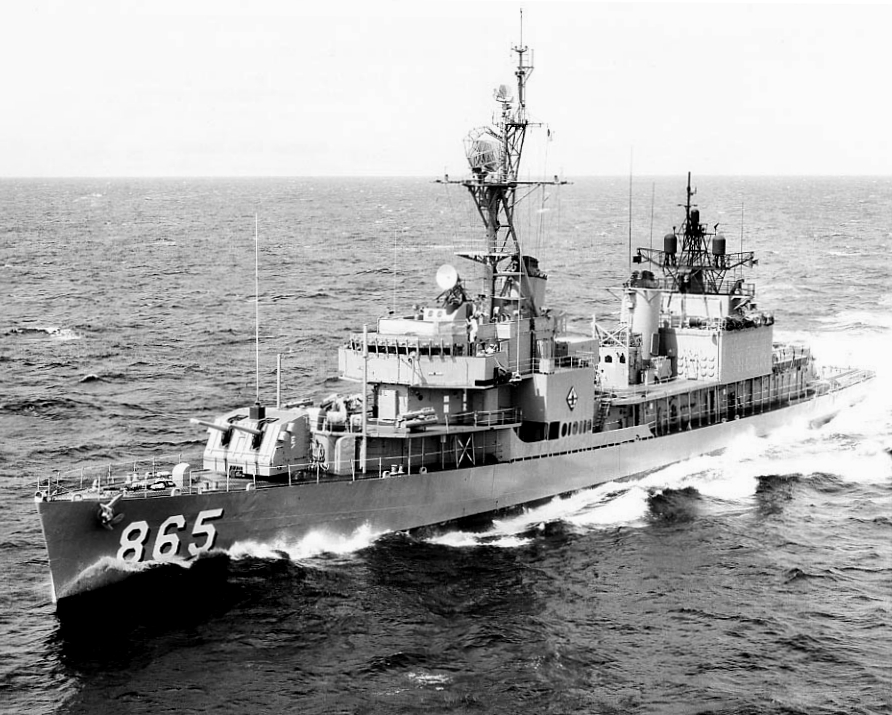
- USS Charles R. Ware (DD-865) underway off Oahu in August 1967

History

United States
- Name: Charles R. Ware
- Namesake: Charles R. Ware
- Builder: Bethlehem Mariners Harbor, Staten Island, New York
- Laid down: 1 November 1944
- Launched: 12 April 1945
- Commissioned: 21 July 1945
- Decommissioned: 12 December 1974
- Identification: Callsign: NBGE; Hull number: DD-865
- Fate: Sunk as target 15 November 1981

General characteristics
- Class & type: Gearing-class destroyer
- Displacement: 2,425 tons
- Length: 390 ft 6 in (119.02 m)
- Beam: 41 ft 1 in (12.52 m)
- Draft: 18 ft 6 in (5.64 m)
- Speed: 35 kn (65 km/h; 40 mph)
- Complement: 367 officers and enlisted
- Armament: 6 5 in (130 mm)/38 guns, 5 21" tt., 6 dcp., 2 dct.

USS Charles R. Ware (DD-865), was a Gearing-class destroyer of the United States Navy in service from 1945 to 1974. After her decommissioning, she was sunk as a target in 1981.

== Namesake ==
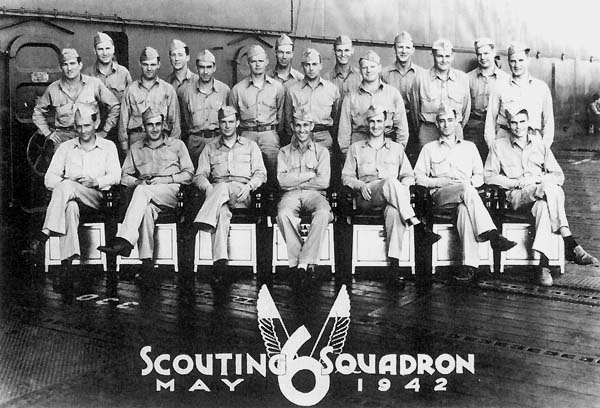
Charles R. Ware with VS-6 pilots, seated, 3rd from left

Charles Rollins Ware was born on 11 March 1911 in Knoxville, Tennessee. He enlisted in the United States Navy on 14 June 1929, and in 1930 was appointed to the United States Naval Academy. After graduation in 1934, Ware served on the battleship USS Texas and the destroyer USS Dahlgren until February 1940, when he entered flight training at Naval Air Station Pensacola, Florida.

Serving as a Douglas SBD Dauntless dive bomber pilot with Scouting Squadron 6 (VS-6) based on the aircraft carrier USS Enterprise, Lieutenant Ware and his division of six SBDs attacked the carrier Kaga on 4 June 1942, one of four Japanese carriers sunk in the Battle of Midway. During their return to the Enterprise they successfully fought off attacks by Japanese fighters, but ran out of fuel and were forced to ditch. One crew was rescued and another crew was picked up by a Japanese destroyer and later executed. Ware and the other SBD crewmen were reported missing in action. He was posthumously awarded the Navy Cross.

The planned destroyer escort USS Charles R. Ware (DE-547) was named for him, but its construction was cancelled in 1944 before construction could begin.

== Construction ==
Charles R. Ware was laid down by the Bethlehem Steel Corporation at Staten Island in New York on 1 November 1944, launched on 12 April 1945 by Mrs. Z. Ware and commissioned on 21 July 1945.

== Operational history ==
From her home ports at Norfolk, Virginia, and after December 1950, Newport, Rhode Island, Charles R. Ware operated through 1960 with the Atlantic Fleet. Along with many deployments to the Mediterranean Sea and northern Europe, she carried out training and overhaul necessary. Her first major cruise, between 1 March and 9 April 1946, was to northern waters, where she aided in developing techniques for cold weather operations, crossing the Arctic Circle.

Shortly thereafter, she served as target ship for submarines training off New London, Connecticut. On 10 November 1947 the ship got underway for the Mediterranean, and her first tour of duty with the 6th Fleet. After exercising with this force, and calling at ports of northern Europe, she returned to Norfolk 11 March 1948. Her next tour of duty in the Mediterranean came in 1949, during which for 2 weeks she patrolled off the Levant Coast under the direction of the United Nations' Palestine Truce Commission.

Through two cruises to the Caribbean in the summer of 1949, Charles R. Ware aided in the training of members of the Naval Reserve, then took part in a large-scale Arctic operation before preparing for a 1950 tour with the 6th Fleet in the Mediterranean. Her 1951 tour was highlighted by operations with ships of the Royal Hellenic Navy. Following her 1953 tour, she conducted antisubmarine warfare exercises with British ships off Northern Ireland, calling then at ports in Ireland, Germany, Norway, Denmark, and Belgium. Later that year she took part in exercises with the aircraft carrier HMCS Magnificent off Narragansett Bay.

Early in 1954, she returned to the Mediterranean once more, for a tour of duty which included participation in a North Atlantic Treaty Organization (NATO) operation. Her 1955 deployment began with antisubmarine warfare exercises with the Royal Navy off Northern Ireland, and was followed by her 6th Fleet duty. In summer 1956, she carried midshipmen on a summer training cruise to Northern Europe.

The year 1957 was marked by assignment to escort the ship carrying King Saud of Saudi Arabia into New York harbor for his state visit, and a European cruise during which she exercised with Spanish destroyers. That fall, she put to sea for North Atlantic Treaty Organization exercises and on 20 January 1958, she rescued a downed pilot from the aircraft carrier Essex while conducting air operations off the east coast. Shortly thereafter she cleared for the Mediterranean once more.

During the summer of 1959, Charles R. Ware took part in the historic Operation Inland Seas, the first passage of a naval force through the Saint Lawrence Seaway into the Great Lakes. She took part in the Naval Review in Lake Saint-Louis on 26 June, which was taken by Queen Elizabeth II and President Dwight D. Eisenhower, and sailed on to call at a number of United States and Canadian ports. During her 1960 Mediterranean tour, she carried German naval observers during an exercise in the Ionian Sea.

Charles R. Ware was decommissioned on 12 December 1974 and was sunk as a target in the Caribbean on 15 November 1981.
