= Charlie Ware Snr =

Irish hurler

Charlie Ware
Personal information
- Born: 9 July 1903 Cork, Ireland
- Died: 19 March 1984 (aged 80) Waterford, Ireland
- Occupation: Trade union official

Sport
- Sport: Hurling
- Position: Full-back
Club
- Years: Club
- 1924–1947: Erin's Own
Club titles
- Waterford titles: 12
Inter-county
- Years: County
- 1925–1947: Waterford
Inter-county titles
- Munster titles: 1
- All-Irelands: 0
- NHL: 0

Charles Ware (9 July 1903 – 19 March 1984) was an Irish hurler. At club level, he played with Erin's Own and at inter-county level with the Waterford senior hurling team.

== Playing career ==
Ware was 15-years-old when he first lined out as a goalkeeper with the Meaghers club, however, he spent the rest of his playing days as a full-back. He was a founder-member of the Erin's Own club in 1924. The Erin's Own club won nine consecutive Waterford Senior Hurling Championship titles between 1927 and 1935, and Ware brought his senior county medal tally to 12 with further victories in 1942, 1946 and 1947.

Ware's performances at club level resulted in his inclusion on the Waterford senior hurling squad in 1925 and he was a member of the team that contested the 1929 Munster Senior Hurling Championship final. He later became the first Waterford player to be selected for Munster, and he won four Railway Cup medals between 1929 and 1934. Ware was at full-back when, in 1938, Waterford won their first ever Munster SHC title. Waterford were subsequently beaten by Dublin in the 1938 All-Ireland final.

== Post-playing career ==
Ware retired from inter-county hurling in 1947, however, he remained with the team as a selector and saw his brother, Jim Ware, captain the team to their inaugural All-Ireland SHC in 1948. He was also Waterford's delegate to the Munster Council and Central Councl.

== Personal life and death ==
Ware was born in Cork in July 1903 but raised in the Ballybricken area of Waterford. He began his working life at Hearne & Cahill's boot and shoe factory in Waterford, before later becoming a trade union official. Ware's son, "Young" Charlie Ware, was part of Waterford's All-Ireland SHC–winning team in 1959.

Ware died on 19 March 1984, at the age of 80.

== Honours ==
=== Player ===
Erin's Own

- Waterford Senior Hurling Championship: 1927, 1928, 1929, 1930, 1931, 1932, 1933, 1934, 1935, 1942, 1946, 1947

Waterford

- Munster Senior Hurling Championship: 1938

Munster

- Railway Cup: 1929, 1930, 1931, 1934

=== Selector ===
Waterford

- All-Ireland Senior Hurling Championship: 1948
- Munster Senior Hurling Championship: 1948
